= Gymnastics at the 1992 Summer Olympics – Women's artistic team all-around =

Women's artistic team all-around at the Games of the XXV Olympiad
- Venue: Palau Sant Jordi
- Date: 28 July 1992
- Competitors: 72 from 12 nations

Medalists
1st place, gold medalist(s)		Svetlana Boginskaya, Tatiana Lysenko, Rozalia Galiyeva, Tatiana Gutsu, Elena Grudneva, and Oksana Chusovitina	Unified Team
2nd place, silver medalist(s)		Cristina Bontaș, Gina Gogean, Vanda Hădărean, Lavinia Miloșovici, Maria Neculiță, and Mirela Pașca	Romania
3rd place, bronze medalist(s)		Wendy Bruce, Dominique Dawes, Shannon Miller, Betty Okino, Kerri Strug, and Kim Zmeskal	United States

These are the results of the women's artistic team all-around competition, one of six events for female competitors in artistic gymnastics at the 1992 Summer Olympics in Barcelona. The compulsory and optional rounds took place on July 28 at the Palau Sant Jordi.

== Qualification ==
The top 12 teams at the 1991 World Artistic Gymnastics Championships earned places in the team all-around competition.

== Results ==
Rank	Team	Vault			Uneven Bars			Balance Beam			Floor			Total	Rank
Rank	Team	C	O	Rank	C	O	Rank	C	O	Rank	C	O	Rank	Total	Rank
Gold medal	Unified Team	98.860		3	98.960		2	98.748		1	99.098		1	395.666	
Gold medal	Svetlana Boginskaya	9.850	9.950	8	9.925	9.862	10	9.875	9.925	2	9.975	9.925	1	79.287	2
Gold medal	Tatiana Lysenko	9.862	9.962	5	9.862	9.912	13	9.837	9.950	3	9.912	9.825	12	79.122	5
Gold medal	Rozalia Galiyeva*	9.812	9.887	20	9.850	9.900	14	9.750	9.912	11	9.862	9.912	10	78.885	8
Gold medal	Tatiana Gutsu*	9.837	9.950	9	9.937	9.962	1	9.887	9.425	37	9.925	9.925	5	78.848	9
Gold medal	Elena Grudneva	9.762	9.875	24	9.850	9.900	14	9.812	9.875	9	9.825	9.512	43	78.411	22
Gold medal	Oksana Chusovitina	9.850	9.900	14	9.012	9.837	77	9.875	9.800	10	9.912	9.925	7	78.111	30
Silver medal	Romania	98.935		2	98.986		1	98.184		3	98.974		2	395.079	
Silver medal	Cristina Bontaș	9.812	9.937	16	9.900	9.900	8	9.900	9.862	5	9.950	9.950	1	79.211	3
Silver medal	Lavinia Miloșovici	9.887	9.950	4	9.937	9.925	3	9.862	9.775	13	9.912	9.950	3	79.198	4
Silver medal	Gina Gogean	9.837	9.975	7	9.850	9.887	17	9.800	9.750	19	9.862	9.925	8	78.886	7
Silver medal	Vanda Hădărean	9.787	9.950	17	9.850	9.900	14	9.687	9.887	16	9.825	9.875	17	78.761	11
Silver medal	Maria Neculiță	9.850	9.900	14	9.762	9.837	37	9.737	9.837	16	9.775	9.925	17	78.623	17
Silver medal	Mirela Pașca	9.837	9.900	17	9.887	9.950	5	9.512	9.837	34	9.800	9.862	19	78.585	19
Bronze medal	United States	99.111		1	98.722		4	98.048		4	98.823		3	394.704	
Bronze medal	Shannon Miller	9.950	9.925	1	9.912	9.950	3	9.887	9.900	3	9.887	9.900	8	79.311	1
Bronze medal	Betty Okino	9.887	9.937	5	9.850	9.887	17	9.862	9.850	7	9.900	9.825	14	78.998	6
Bronze medal	Kim Zmeskal	9.900	9.950	3	9.887	9.900	10	9.350	9.912	42	9.925	9.925	5	78.749	12
Bronze medal	Kerri Strug	9.837	9.950	9	9.837	9.862	25	9.775	9.750	20	9.887	9.837	15	78.735	14
Bronze medal	Dominique Dawes	9.762	9.900	22	9.762	9.812	41	9.750	9.637	32	9.812	9.925	12	78.360	26
Bronze medal	Wendy Bruce	9.825	9.950	11	9.787	9.850	30	9.650	9.712	33	9.750	9.637	42	78.161	28
4	China	98.035		6	98.736		3	98.410		2	97.960		4	392.941	
4	Yang Bo	9.850	9.800	23	9.850	9.850	23	9.800	9.925	6	9.812	9.850	19	78.737	13
4	Lu Li	9.812	9.812	29	9.887	9.937	6	9.887	9.925	1	9.812	9.662	33	78.734	15
4	Li Yifang	9.775	9.850	27	9.837	9.875	21	9.787	9.912	8	9.762	9.800	27	78.598	18
4	Li Li	9.737	9.850	32	9.900	9.900	8	9.712	9.812	21	9.775	9.850	22	78.536	20
4	He Xuemei	9.562	9.837	68	9.675	9.900	40	9.800	9.850	12	9.737	9.837	26	78.198	27
4	Zhang Xia	9.637	9.762	67	9.800	9.825	32	9.712	9.700	29	9.537	9.800	43	77.773	35
5	Spain	98.059		5	98.360		5	97.123		5	97.886		5	391.428	
5	Cristina Fraguas	9.712	9.837	39	9.900	9.912	7	9.700	9.725	28	9.800	9.850	21	78.436	21
5	Sonia Fraguas	9.750	9.837	32	9.387	9.862	58	9.812	9.787	15	9.850	9.862	16	78.147	29
5	Alicia Fernández	9.775	9.850	27	9.750	9.875	32	9.725	9.550	40	9.787	9.750	30	78.062	31
5	Eva Rueda	9.837	9.937	12	9.837	9.900	17	9.787	9.700	22	9.825	9.212	71	78.035	32
5	Ruth Rollán	9.637	9.837	51	9.812	9.812	35	9.637	9.200	67	9.712	9.750	35	77.397	42
5	Silvia Martínez	9.687	9.775	57	9.700	9.337	69	9.575	9.700	40	9.637	9.700	43	77.111	49
6	Hungary	98.097		4	97.661		8	95.208		9	97.636		6	388.602	
6	Henrietta Ónodi	9.900	9.962	2	9.900	9.875	12	9.887	9.312	47	9.937	9.925	3	78.698	16
6	Andrea Molnár	9.762	9.925	21	9.850	9.850	23	9.812	9.637	26	9.725	9.825	28	78.386	23
6	Bernadett Balázs	9.662	9.812	51	9.600	9.712	54	9.675	8.962	75	9.700	9.775	32	76.898	54
6	Kinga Horváth	9.700	9.825	43	9.650	9.725	52	9.487	9.437	59	9.362	9.650	73	76.836	55
6	Ildikó Balog	9.662	9.750	64	9.600	9.225	78	9.400	8.712	87	9.550	9.725	48	75.625	81
6	Krisztina Molnár	0.000	9.887	90	9.662	9.837	46	9.737	9.262	55	9.762	9.712	33	67.859	89
7	Australia	97.160		10	98.134		7	95.860		6	96.348		10	387.502	
7	Lisa Read	9.812	9.437	80	9.850	9.862	21	9.787	9.675	24	9.762	9.750	31	77.935	33
7	Monique Allen	9.737	9.750	49	9.862	9.787	29	9.775	9.700	23	9.675	9.262	79	77.548	39
7	Kylie Shadbolt	9.762	9.712	51	9.737	9.812	43	9.712	9.187	63	9.712	9.562	50	77.196	46
7	Jane Warrilow	9.625	9.700	76	9.775	9.712	47	9.587	9.450	51	9.650	9.550	58	77.049	51
7	Julie-Anne Monico	9.675	9.637	77	9.812	9.862	27	9.487	9.450	58	9.725	8.712	87	76.360	68
7	Brooke Gysen	9.675	9.700	71	9.537	9.775	54	9.537	8.812	84	9.575	9.700	48	76.311	69
8	France	97.322		8	96.522		11	95.635		8	97.563		7	387.052	
8	Marie-Angéline Colson	9.787	9.850	24	9.762	9.675	48	9.637	9.500	49	9.725	9.725	36	77.661	36
8	Virginie Machado	9.675	9.762	61	9.750	9.837	39	9.587	9.675	42	9.625	9.700	46	77.611	37
8	Chloé Maigre	9.687	9.712	68	9.875	9.787	28	9.737	9.187	59	9.612	9.687	47	77.284	43
8	Karine Boucher	9.737	9.800	41	9.437	9.137	85	9.562	9.650	46	9.750	9.500	54	76.573	62
8	Karine Charlier	9.562	9.750	77	9.312	9.612	75	9.225	9.575	68	9.437	9.675	67	76.148	71
8	Jenny Rolland	9.512	9.675	83	9.562	9.225	80	8.912	9.487	83	9.412	9.637	70	75.422	84
9	Germany	97.672		7	95.683		12	95.747		7	96.860		8	385.962	
9	Kathleen Stark	9.812	9.812	29	9.812	9.762	41	9.762	9.250	53	9.825	9.762	24	77.797	34
9	Diana Schröder	9.712	9.650	72	9.650	9.787	48	9.587	9.662	44	9.687	9.725	38	77.460	40
9	Jana Günther	9.662	9.725	70	9.612	9.662	57	9.300	9.612	62	9.600	9.662	51	76.835	56
9	Anke Schönfelder	9.775	9.762	41	9.837	8.725	86	9.712	8.887	77	9.825	9.625	36	76.148	71
9	Gabi Weller	9.700	9.825	43	9.712	8.762	87	9.287	9.575	65	9.625	9.462	68	75.948	73
9	Annette Potempa	9.737	9.812	39	9.237	9.087	89	9.500	9.687	48	9.675	9.187	82	75.922	74
10	Canada	97.310		10	96.572		10	95.136		10	96.534		9	385.552	
10	Stella Umeh	9.812	9.900	19	9.775	9.850	32	9.737	9.700	27	9.750	9.837	24	78.361	25
10	Lori Strong	9.712	9.712	63	9.762	9.262	70	9.700	9.600	39	9.712	9.512	56	76.972	53
10	Janine Rankin	9.750	9.800	37	8.962	9.762	82	9.387	9.400	70	9.637	9.537	60	76.235	70
10	Mylène Fleury	9.625	9.412	86	9.550	9.662	63	9.425	8.987	82	9.512	9.650	61	75.823	77
10	Jennifer Wood	9.500	9.837	74	9.612	9.637	58	8.487	9.450	89	9.487	9.700	59	75.710	78
10	Janet Morin	9.750	0.000	91	9.700	0.000	92	9.650	0.000	91	9.687	0.000	91	38.787	92
11	North Korea	96.960		11	98.223		6	94.747		12	95.373		12	385.303	
11	Choi Gyong-Hui	9.725	9.800	43	9.875	9.862	17	9.687	9.725	29	9.750	9.187	79	77.611	37
11	Kim Gwang-Suk	9.800	9.712	47	9.950	9.925	2	9.800	8.937	71	9.675	9.475	62	77.274	44
11	Li Chun-Mi	9.712	9.700	64	9.837	9.800	30	9.837	9.175	53	9.750	9.225	76	77.036	52
11	Hwang Bo-Sil	9.650	9.562	81	9.825	9.787	36	9.587	9.312	63	9.187	9.637	84	76.547	63
11	An Myong-Hwa	9.187	9.812	87	9.237	9.762	71	9.350	9.337	74	9.512	9.712	56	75.909	75
11	Pak Gyong-Sil	9.487	8.400	89	9.600	9.300	76	8.712	0.000	92	9.450	0.000	92	54.949	91
12	Bulgaria	96.610		12	97.059		9	94.897		11	96.299		11	384.865	
12	Silvia Mitova	9.875	9.887	13	9.825	9.850	26	9.787	9.787	16	9.887	9.875	11	78.773	10
12	Delyana Vodenicharova	9.850	9.600	59	9.837	9.225	68	9.837	9.500	35	9.875	9.725	23	77.449	41
12	Tanya Maslarska	9.637	9.700	74	8.837	9.512	88	9.362	9.500	65	9.462	9.525	74	75.535	82
12	Svetlana Todorova	9.775	9.637	64	9.762	9.537	56	9.600	8.237	90	9.800	9.100	81	75.448	83
12	Khristina Panayotova	9.712	8.937	88	9.562	9.662	62	9.462	8.712	86	9.600	9.100	85	74.747	87
12	Snejana Hristakieva	9.625	0.000	92	9.737	9.775	45	9.750	8.962	73	9.812	8.700	86	66.361	90
	Luísa Portocarrero (GUA)	9.762	9.825	32	9.812	9.787	37	9.812	9.825	13	9.775	9.775	28	78.373	24
	Mari Kosuge (JPN)	9.787	9.850	24	9.225	9.575	79	9.675	9.725	31	9.750	9.662	38	77.249	45
	Elvira Becks (NED)	9.750	9.825	36	9.725	9.712	48	9.587	9.150	71	9.775	9.637	38	77.161	47
	Bénédicte Evrard (BEL)	9.787	9.687	51	9.750	9.662	51	9.600	9.712	37	9.700	9.262	77	77.160	48
	Pavla Kinclová (TCH)	9.775	9.750	43	9.662	9.025	83	9.750	9.700	25	9.700	9.712	38	77.074	50
	Luisa Parente (BRA)	9.787	9.837	29	9.812	9.737	43	8.875	9.612	81	9.662	9.475	63	76.797	57
	Iveta Poloková (TCH)	9.787	9.675	57	9.625	9.600	61	9.575	9.662	45	9.762	9.087	83	76.773	58
	Romina Plataroti (ARG)	9.725	9.787	47	9.612	9.362	72	9.550	9.500	50	9.562	9.575	63	76.673	59
	Kyoko Seo (JPN)	9.762	9.825	32	9.712	9.075	80	9.487	9.550	51	9.575	9.675	54	76.661	60
	Andrea Giordano (ARG)	9.612	9.650	79	9.675	9.675	53	9.512	9.412	59	9.600	9.450	69	76.586	61
	Daniela Bártová (TCH)	9.737	9.725	56	9.487	9.587	67	9.462	9.500	56	9.587	9.550	63	76.535	64
	Veronica Servente (ITA)	9.725	9.712	61	9.400	9.562	73	9.562	9.237	69	9.725	9.537	51	76.460	65
	Hanako Miura (JPN)	9.712	9.762	51	9.525	9.662	64	9.575	8.937	80	9.612	9.650	51	76.435	66
	Sarah Mercer (GBR)	9.737	9.712	60	9.700	9.537	60	9.487	9.087	78	9.600	9.525	66	76.385	67
	Giulia Volpi (ITA)	9.800	9.562	72	8.650	9.562	90	9.762	9.575	35	9.837	9.125	77	75.873	76
	Anita Tomulevska (NOR)	9.600	9.612	81	9.537	9.587	65	9.437	9.512	57	9.500	8.912	88	75.697	79
	Denisse López (MEX)	9.675	9.800	50	9.575	9.500	66	9.225	8.887	87	9.475	9.550	72	75.687	80
	Rowena Roberts (GBR)	9.587	9.587	85	9.625	8.987	84	8.862	9.700	79	9.600	9.387	74	75.335	85
	Lee Hee-Kyung (KOR)	9.750	9.800	37	9.812	9.125	74	9.725	8.900	76	9.712	8.125	90	74.999	86
	Min A-Young (KOR)	9.525	9.662	83	8.550	9.562	91	8.700	9.512	85	9.425	8.887	89	73.823	88

- Tatiana Gutsu did not officially qualify for the individual all-around, and Rozalia Galiyeva did. However, coaches pulled Galiyeva out due to a knee injury and replaced her with Gutsu, who later won the all-around.
