= Gymnastics at the 1992 Summer Olympics – Women's artistic individual all-around =

Women's artistic individual all-around at the Games of the XXV Olympiad
- Pictogram for Gymnastics
- Venue: Palau Sant Jordi
- Date: 28 – 30 July 1992
- Competitors: 92 from 24 nations

Medalists
1st place, gold medalist(s)		Tatiana Gutsu	Unified Team
2nd place, silver medalist(s)		Shannon Miller	United States
3rd place, bronze medalist(s)		Lavinia Miloșovici	Romania

These are the results of the women's individual all-around competition, one of six events for female competitors in artistic gymnastics at the 1992 Summer Olympics in Barcelona. The qualification and final rounds took place on July 28 and 30th 1992 at the Palau Sant Jordi.

== Results ==
=== Final ===
Position	Gymnast	Vault (gymnastics)	Uneven bars	Balance beam	Floor (gymnastics)	Total
Gold medal	Tatiana Gutsu (EUN)	9.950	9.950	9.912	9.925	39.737
Silver medal	Shannon Miller (USA)	9.975	9.925	9.925	9.900	39.725
Bronze medal	Lavinia Miloșovici (ROM)	9.975	9.900	9.850	9.962	39.687
4	Cristina Bontaș (ROM)	9.950	9.862	9.900	9.962	39.674
5	Svetlana Boginskaya (EUN)	9.962	9.887	9.912	9.912	39.673
6	Gina Gogean (ROM)	9.950	9.862	9.900	9.912	39.624
7	Tatiana Lysenko (EUN)	9.962	9.900	9.875	9.800	39.537
8	Henrietta Ónodi (HUN)	9.950	9.875	9.712	9.912	39.449
9	Sonia Fraguas (ESP)	9.825	9.887	9.862	9.850	39.424
10	Kim Zmeskal (USA)	9.937	9.900	9.800	9.775	39.412
11	Sylvia Mitova (BUL)	9.862	9.825	9.825	9.887	39.399
12	Betty Okino (USA)	9.825	9.850	9.850	9.862	39.387
13	Cristina Fraguas (ESP)	9.837	9.800	9.800	9.887	39.324
14	Li Li (CHN)	9.825	9.837	9.750	9.850	39.262
15	Andrea Molnár (HUN)	9.950	9.800	9.687	9.800	39.237
16	Stella Umeh (CAN)	9.850	9.812	9.700	9.850	39.212
17	Mari Kosuge (JPN)	9.887	9.775	9.800	9.700	39.162
18	Luisa Portocarrero (GUA)	9.812	9.812	9.725	9.812	39.161
19	Monique Allen (AUS)	9.737	9.837	9.737	9.775	39.086
20	Alicia Fernández (ESP)	9.850	9.800	9.587	9.837	39.074
20	Li Chun-mi (PRK)	9.800	9.762	9.787	9.725	39.074
22	Elvira Becks (NED)	9.825	9.750	9.650	9.775	39.000
23	Bénédicte Evrard (BEL)	9.762	9.775	9.650	9.787	38.974
24	Pavla Kinclová (TCH)	9.775	9.712	9.725	9.687	38.899
25	Yang Bo (CHN)	9.787	9.350	9.912	9.837	38.886
26	Virginie Machado (FRA)	9.737	9.687	9.650	9.750	38.824
27	Choi Gyong-hui (PRK)	9.775	9.837	9.400	9.725	38.737
28	Kim Gwang-Suk (PRK)	9.487	9.887	9.712	9.637	38.723
29	Diana Schröder (GER)	9.650	9.500	9.712	9.762	38.624
30	Lisa Read (AUS)	9.362	9.837	9.662	9.750	38.611
31	Deliana Vodenitcharova (BUL)	9.537	9.800	9.112	9.837	38.286
32	Kathleen Stark (GER)	9.825	9.800	9.687	8.962	38.274
32	Chloé Maigre (FRA)	9.712	9.775	9.662	9.125	38.274
34	Lu Li (CHN)	9.812	9.912	8.737	9.612	38.073
35	Marie-Angéline Colson (FRA)	9.787	9.800	8.962	9.225	37.774
36	Kylie Shadbolt (AUS)	9.287	8.975	9.650	9.637	37.549
