= 1991 World Artistic Gymnastics Championships =

Gymnastics competition

- Venue: Hoosier Dome
- Location: Indianapolis, United States
- Start date: September 6, 1991
- End date: September 16, 1991

The 26th Artistic Gymnastics World Championships were held in Indianapolis, United States, in the Hoosier Dome from September 6 to 15, 1991. This was the last championships at which the Soviet Union competed before its collapse.

== Results ==
Event	Gold	Silver	Bronze
Men
Team all-around	Soviet Union; Vitaly Scherbo; Grigory Misutin; Valeri Liukin; Igor Korobchinsky; Valery Belenky; Alexei Voropaev	China; Li Jing; Li Chunyang; Huang Huadong; Guo Linyao; Li Xiaoshuang; Li Ge	Germany; Sylvio Kroll; Andreas Wecker; Ralf Büchner; Mario Franke; Jan-Peter Nikiferow; Andre Hempel
Individual all-around	(Soviet Union) Grigory Misutin	(Soviet Union) Vitaly Scherbo	(Soviet Union) Valeri Liukin
Floor	(Soviet Union) Igor Korobchinsky	(Soviet Union) Vitaly Scherbo	(Japan) Daisuke Nishikawa
Pommel horse	(Soviet Union) Valery Belenky	(China) Guo Linyao	(China) Li Jing
Rings	(Soviet Union) Grigory Misutin	(Germany) Andreas Wecker	(Italy) Yuri Chechi
Vault	(South Korea) You Ok-Youl	(Soviet Union) Vitaly Scherbo	(Japan) Yutaka Aihara
Parallel bars	(China) Li Jing	(Soviet Union) Igor Korobchinsky	(China) Guo Linyao
Horizontal bar	(China) Li Chunyang (Germany) Ralf Büchner	none awarded	(Soviet Union) Vitaly Scherbo
Women
Team all-around	Soviet Union; Svetlana Boginskaya; Tatiana Gutsu; Tatiana Lysenko; Oksana Chusovitina; Rozalia Galiyeva; Natalia Kalinina	United States; Shannon Miller; Kim Zmeskal; Betty Okino; Kerri Strug; Michelle Campi; Hilary Grivich	Romania; Cristina Bontaş; Mirela Pasca; Lavinia Miloșovici; Vanda Hădărean; Maria Neculiță; Eugenia Popa
Individual all-around	(United States) Kim Zmeskal	(Soviet Union) Svetlana Boginskaya	(Romania) Cristina Bontaş
Vault	(Romania) Lavinia Miloșovici	(Soviet Union) Oksana Chusovitina (Hungary) Henrietta Ónodi	none awarded
Uneven bars	(North Korea) Kim Gwang Suk	(Soviet Union) Tatiana Gutsu (United States) Shannon Miller	none awarded
Balance beam	(Soviet Union) Svetlana Boginskaya	(Soviet Union) Tatiana Gutsu	(United States) Betty Okino (Romania) Lavinia Miloșovici
Floor	(Soviet Union) Oksana Chusovitina (Romania) Cristina Bontaş	none awarded	(United States) Kim Zmeskal

== Men ==
=== Team Final ===
Rank	Team	Floor		Pommel Horse		Rings		Vault		Parallel Bars		Horizontal Bar		Total
Rank	Team	C	O	C	O	C	O	C	O	C	O	C	O	Total
Gold medal	Soviet Union	97.300		97.350		98.000		96.325		97.825		97.625		584.425
Gold medal	Vitaly Scherbo	9.875	9.700	9.450	9.875	9.775	9.775	9.775	9.675	9.900	9.800	9.750	9.825	117.175
Gold medal	Grigory Misutin	9.775	9.675	9.650	9.875	9.750	9.875	9.675	9.500	9.775	9.800	9.700	9.850	116.900
Gold medal	Valeri Liukin	9.725	9.775	9.650	9.800	9.825	9.850	9.700	9.525	9.775	9.725	9.675	9.800	116.825
Gold medal	Igor Korobchinsky	9.750	9.725	9.700	9.400	9.775	9.800	9.825	9.550	9.900	9.725	9.750	9.800	116.700
Gold medal	Valery Belenky	9.575	9.725	9.725	9.900	9.700	9.825	9.500	9.450	9.650	9.775	9.650	9.600	116.075
Gold medal	Alexei Voropaev	9.500	9.650	9.525	9.650	9.750	9.700	9.025	9.600	9.625	9.675	9.625	9.825	115.150
Silver medal	China	95.875		97.450		97.100		95.350		96.000		95.275		577.050
Silver medal	Li Jing	9.700	9.550	9.725	9.900	9.675	9.850	9.625	9.725	9.725	9.750	9.575	9.200	116.000
Silver medal	Li Xiaoshuang	9.475	9.800	9.675	9.800	9.700	9.900	9.525	9.600	9.675	9.200	9.625	9.200	115.175
Silver medal	Li Chunyang	9.700	9.625	9.400	9.800	9.650	9.750	9.350	9.550	9.400	9.525	9.550	9.800	115.100
Silver medal	Huang Huadong	9.625	9.325	9.525	9.850	9.525	9.650	9.475	9.500	9.650	9.600	9.525	9.700	114.950
Silver medal	Guo Linyao	9.550	9.525	9.750	9.875	9.475	9.250	9.475	9.500	9.625	9.750	9.550	9.125	114.450
Silver medal	Li Ge	9.375	9.225	9.550	9.725	9.575	9.825	9.375	9.350	9.500	9.150	9.475	9.550	113.675
Bronze medal	Germany	95.825		96.450		96.875		94.975		96.025		95.975		576.125
Bronze medal	Sylvio Kroll	9.625	9.700	9.650	9.800	9.675	9.750	9.650	9.650	9.650	9.650	9.600	9.775	116.175
Bronze medal	Andreas Wecker	9.800	9.750	9.700	9.875	9.850	9.725	9.575	9.550	9.675	9.425	9.700	9.500	116.125
Bronze medal	Ralf Büchner	9.250	9.475	9.625	9.450	9.550	9.650	8.975	9.525	9.600	9.625	9.550	9.825	114.100
Bronze medal	Mario Franke	9.550	9.425	9.450	9.625	9.625	9.675	9.650	8.950	9.675	9.650	9.625	9.125	114.025
Bronze medal	Jan-Peter Nikiferow	9.450	9.575	9.500	9.700	9.625	9.450	9.375	9.400	9.550	9.075	9.550	9.275	113.525
Bronze medal	Andre Hempel	9.475	9.200	7.650	9.525	9.575	9.725	9.300	9.300	9.475	9.525	9.600	9.525	111.875
4	Japan	95.600		96.300		96.150		95.000		96.250		95.625		574.925
4	Yukio Iketani	9.650	9.225	9.625	9.675	9.775	9.675	9.700	9.500	9.600	9.525	9.700	9.700	115.350
4	Yoshiaki Hatakeda	9.500	9.375	9.500	9.825	9.600	9.425	9.500	9.400	9.700	9.700	9.575	9.575	114.675
4	Daisuke Nishikawa	9.675	9.625	9.175	9.400	9.700	9.675	9.425	9.450	9.725	9.650	9.625	9.300	114.425
4	Takashi Chinen	9.575	9.575	9.475	9.800	9.450	9.525	9.325	9.425	9.575	9.475	9.650	9.525	114.375
4	Masayuki Matsunaga	9.324	9.425	9.375	9.750	9.500	9.650	9.300	9.375	9.525	9.625	9.525	9.450	113.825
4	Yutaka Aihara	9.675	9.525	9.650	9.625	9.625	9.275	9.750	9.525	9.625	9.525	8.400	8.750	112.950

=== All-around ===
Rank	Gymnast	Floor (gymnastics)	Pommel horse	Rings (gymnastics)	Vault (gymnastics)	Parallel bars	Horizontal bar	Total
1st place, gold medalist(s)	Grigory Misutin (URS)	9.900	9.800	9.825	9.775	9.850	9.900	59.050
2nd place, silver medalist(s)	Vitaly Scherbo (URS)	9.850	9.800	9.900	9.775	9.775	9.850	58.850
3rd place, bronze medalist(s)	Valeri Liukin (URS)	9.675	9.850	9.750	9.600	9.725	9.900	58.500
4	Li Xiaoshuang (CHN)	9.775	9.775	9.775	9.525	9.775	9.725	58.350
5	Yuri Chechi (ITA)	9.775	9.750	9.850	9.550	9.600	9.475	58.000
5	Sylvio Kroll (GER)	9.475	9.775	9.700	9.675	9.575	9.800	58.000
7	Daisuke Nishikawa (JPN)	9.700	9.700	9.625	9.500	9.725	9.725	57.975
8	Li Chunyang (CHN)	9.775	9.725	9.750	9.400	9.600	9.700	57.950
9	Andreas Wecker (GER)	9.600	9.850	9.825	9.500	9.625	9.500	57.900
10	Yoshiaki Hatakeda (JPN)	9.575	9.750	9.600	9.500	9.650	9.750	57.825
10	Ralf Büchner (GER)	9.500	9.625	9.700	9.600	9.600	9.800	57.825
10	Scott Keswick (USA)	9.575	9.425	9.700	9.675	9.625	9.825	57.825
13	Yukio Iketani (JPN)	9.725	9.700	9.800	9.625	9.225	9.700	57.775
14	Han Yoon-Soo (KOR)	9.450	9.550	9.700	9.500	9.650	9.725	57.575
15	Lee Joo-Huang (KOR)	9.550	9.625	9.575	9.550	9.550	9.700	57.550
16	Jarrod Hanks (USA)	9.675	9.650	9.675	9.400	9.425	9.700	57.525
17	Kalofer Hristozov (BUL)	9.575	9.625	9.550	9.550	9.700	9.500	57.500
18	Zoltán Supola (HUN)	9.475	9.325	9.725	9.600	9.650	9.625	57.400
18	Szilveszter Csollány (HUN)	9.475	9.725	9.675	9.375	9.475	9.675	57.400
20	Chris Waller (USA)	9.525	9.725	9.700	9.225	9.500	9.700	57.375
21	Csaba Fajkusz (HUN)	9.475	9.550	9.575	9.450	9.400	9.825	57.275
21	Li Jing (CHN)	9.375	9.900	9.675	9.500	9.650	9.175	57.275
23	Ruggero Rossato (ITA)	9.225	9.550	9.700	9.500	9.575	9.650	57.200
23	Marius Gherman (ROU)	9.450	9.650	9.450	9.550	9.475	9.625	57.200
25	Daniel Giubellini (SUI)	9.375	9.625	9.600	9.400	9.475	9.675	57.150
26	Dimitar Taskov (BUL)	9.300	9.550	9.450	9.575	9.525	9.650	57.050
27	Neil Thomas (GBR)	9.650	9.600	9.400	9.350	9.475	9.550	57.025
28	Adrian Gal (ROU)	9.550	9.525	9.450	9.350	9.575	9.500	56.950
28	Michael Engeler (SUI)	9.550	9.475	9.425	9.350	9.350	9.800	56.950
30	Curtis Hibbert (CAN)	9.475	9.050	9.425	9.600	9.575	9.775	56.900
31	Dian Kolev (BUL)	9.475	9.225	9.475	9.525	9.525	9.575	56.800
31	Adrian Catanoiu (ROU)	9.425	9.600	9.700	9.400	9.175	9.500	56.800
33	Pae Gil-Su (PRK)	9.150	9.250	9.425	9.450	9.725	9.775	56.775
34	James May (GBR)	9.575	9.400	9.500	9.500	9.250	9.500	56.725
34	Boris Preti (ITA)	9.375	9.600	9.675	9.425	9.500	9.150	56.725
36	Christian Chevalier (FRA)	9.125	9.375	9.350	9.325	9.500	9.275	55.950

=== Floor Exercise ===
Rank	Gymnast	Total
1st place, gold medalist(s)	Igor Korobchinsky (URS)	9.875
2nd place, silver medalist(s)	Vitaly Scherbo (URS)	9.800
3rd place, bronze medalist(s)	Daisuke Nishikawa (JPN)	9.787
4	Yuri Chechi (ITA)	9.762
5	Andreas Wecker (GER)	9.700
6	Neil Thomas (GBR)	9.675
7	Sylvio Kroll (GER)	9.650
8	Li Chunyang (CHN)	9.150

=== Pommel Horse ===
Rank	Gymnast	Total
1st place, gold medalist(s)	Valery Belenky (URS)	9.912
2nd place, silver medalist(s)	Guo Linyao (CHN)	9.887
3rd place, bronze medalist(s)	Li Jing (CHN)	9.875
4	Yoshiaki Hatakeda (JPN)	9.862
4	Andreas Wecker (GER)	9.862
6	Yuri Chechi (ITA)	9.837
7	Grigory Misutin (URS)	9.775
8	Sylvio Kroll (GER)	8.775

=== Rings ===
Rank	Gymnast	Total
1st place, gold medalist(s)	Grigory Misutin (URS)	9.875
2nd place, silver medalist(s)	Andreas Wecker (GER)	9.862
3rd place, bronze medalist(s)	Yuri Chechi (ITA)	9.837
4	Li Xiaoshuang (CHN)	9.812
5	Valeri Liukin (URS)	9.800
6	Scott Keswick (USA)	9.775
6	Yukio Iketani (JPN)	9.775
8	Li Jing (CHN)	9.362

=== Vault ===
Rank	Gymnast	Total
1st place, gold medalist(s)	You Ok-Youl (KOR)	9.700
2nd place, silver medalist(s)	Vitaly Scherbo (URS)	9.699
3rd place, bronze medalist(s)	Yutaka Aihara (JPN)	9.631
4	Sylvio Kroll (GER)	9.618
5	Mike Inglis (CAN)	9.581
6	Yukio Iketani (JPN)	9.456
7	Igor Korobchinsky (URS)	9.393
8	Li Jing (CHN)	9.381

=== Parallel Bars ===
Rank	Gymnast	Total
1st place, gold medalist(s)	Li Jing (CHN)	9.862
2nd place, silver medalist(s)	Igor Korobchinsky (URS)	9.825
3rd place, bronze medalist(s)	Guo Linyao (CHN)	9.812
4	Daisuke Nishikawa (JPN)	9.675
5	Sylvio Kroll (GER)	9.662
6	Mario Franke (GER)	9.587
6	Yoshiaki Hatakeda (JPN)	9.587
8	Vitaly Scherbo (URS)	9.487

=== Horizontal Bar ===
Rank	Gymnast	Total
1st place, gold medalist(s)	Ralf Büchner (GER)	9.787
1st place, gold medalist(s)	Li Chunyang (CHN)	9.787
3rd place, bronze medalist(s)	Vitaly Scherbo (URS)	9.775
4	Scott Keswick (USA)	9.725
5	Zoltán Supola (HUN)	9.712
6	Sylvio Kroll (GER)	9.637
7	Grigory Misutin (URS)	8.925
8	Yukio Iketani (JPN)	2.750

== Women ==
=== Team Final ===
Rank	Team	Vault (gymnastics)		Uneven bars		Balance beam		Floor (gymnastics)		Total
Rank	Team	C	O	C	O	C	O	C	O	Total
1st place, gold medalist(s)	Soviet Union	98.874		99.236		98.823		99.122		396.055
1st place, gold medalist(s)	Svetlana Boginskaya	9.875	9.962	9.950	9.962	9.937	9.950	9.950	9.962	79.548
1st place, gold medalist(s)	Tatiana Gutsu	9.825	9.925	9.900	9.975	9.862	9.987	9.912	9.912	79.298
1st place, gold medalist(s)	Tatiana Lysenko	9.800	9.975	9.900	9.987	9.875	9.900	9.912	9.862	79.211
1st place, gold medalist(s)	Oksana Chusovitina	9.837	9.925	9.837	9.925	9.787	9.825	9.875	9.975	78.986
1st place, gold medalist(s)	Rozalia Galiyeva	9.850	9.887	9.875	9.925	9.750	9.900	9.862	9.900	78.949
1st place, gold medalist(s)	Natalia Kalinina	9.750	9.900	9.812	9.887	9.687	9.875	9.825	9.775	78.511
2nd place, silver medalist(s)	United States	98.698		98.198		98.698		98.522		394.116
2nd place, silver medalist(s)	Shannon Miller	9.900	9.937	9.850	9.900	9.937	9.950	9.875	9.887	79.236
2nd place, silver medalist(s)	Kim Zmeskal	9.775	10.000	9.787	9.912	9.875	9.950	9.837	9.950	79.086
2nd place, silver medalist(s)	Betty Okino	9.775	9.937	9.800	9.837	9.925	9.912	9.862	9.875	78.923
2nd place, silver medalist(s)	Kerri Strug	9.750	9.925	9.662	9.875	9.712	9.850	9.762	9.912	78.488
2nd place, silver medalist(s)	Michelle Campi	9.787	9.787	9.762	9.800	9.725	9.862	9.837	9.725	78.285
2nd place, silver medalist(s)	Hilary Grivich	9.662	9.912	9.675	9.800	9.650	9.850	9.725	9.087	77.361
3rd place, bronze medalist(s)	Romania	98.286		98.597		97.985		98.973		393.841
3rd place, bronze medalist(s)	Cristina Bontaș	9.825	9.950	9.887	9.912	9.900	9.950	9.950	9.962	79.336
3rd place, bronze medalist(s)	Mirela Pașca	9.725	9.937	9.875	9.887	9.687	9.875	9.875	9.825	78.686
3rd place, bronze medalist(s)	Lavinia Miloșovici	9.775	9.975	9.887	9.412	9.787	9.900	9.925	9.937	78.598
3rd place, bronze medalist(s)	Vanda Hădărean	9.687	9.850	9.712	9.887	9.712	9.937	9.887	9.875	78.547
3rd place, bronze medalist(s)	Maria Neculiță	9.712	9.850	9.575	9.850	9.375	9.850	9.850	9.925	77.949
3rd place, bronze medalist(s)	Eugenia Popa	9.675	9.812	9.800	9.900	9.200	9.862	9.800	9.825	77.874
4	China	97.585		98.111		98.223		96.723		390.624
4	Shi Liying	9.750	9.750	9.675	9.950	9.712	9.887	9.712	9.750	78.186
4	Li Li	9.787	9.662	9.812	9.950	9.625	9.900	9.700	9.637	78.073
4	Li Yifang	9.687	9.700	9.750	9.925	9.487	9.837	9.700	9.825	77.911
4	Li Yan	9.850	9.812	9.775	9.850	9.750	9.825	9.762	9.125	77.749
4	Yang Bo	9.812	9.675	9.887	9.837	9.950	9.950	9.887	8.637	77.635
4	Zhang Wenning	9.662	9.762	9.412	9.800	9.687	9.925	9.625	9.625	77.498
5	Bulgaria	97.297		96.374		95.735		97.473		386.879
5	Silvia Mitova	9.750	9.762	9.662	9.825	9.812	9.762	9.850	9.900	78.323
5	Maja Hristova	9.787	9.775	9.600	9.775	9.075	9.687	9.762	9.825	77.286
5	Svetlana Ivanova	9.750	9.737	9.500	9.250	9.562	9.600	9.725	9.750	76.874
5	Gergana Peeva	9.662	9.612	9.475	9.662	9.325	9.500	9.637	9.712	76.585
5	Khristina Panayotova	9.700	9.737	9.550	9.675	9.450	9.175	9.700	9.087	76.074
5	Tanya Maslarska	9.562	9.637	8.862	9.650	9.437	9.600	9.587	9.612	75.947
6	Australia	95.960		96.885		95.561		96.873		385.279
6	Monique Allen	9.775	9.587	9.775	9.762	9.700	9.712	9.700	9.787	77.798
6	Kylie Shadbolt	9.675	9.487	9.587	9.612	9.562	9.675	9.675	9.812	77.085
6	Joanna Hughes	9.575	9.700	9.825	9.175	9.725	9.562	9.750	9.750	77.062
6	Julie-Anne Monico	9.537	9.525	9.612	9.700	9.162	9.650	9.500	9.700	76.386
6	Lisa Read	9.612	9.350	9.687	9.625	9.150	9.600	9.562	9.587	76.173
6	Michelle Telfer	9.237	9.487	9.562	9.700	9.112	9.625	9.500	9.637	75.860
7	Spain	96.422		96.472		95.997		96.222		384.813
7	Eva Rueda	9.800	9.812	9.862	9.887	9.712	9.712	9.862	9.300	77.947
7	Miriam de Tena	9.700	9.600	9.700	9.825	9.600	9.700	9.800	9.562	77.487
7	Silvia Martínez	9.587	9.637	9.662	9.737	9.387	9.737	9.637	9.700	77.084
7	Ruth Rollán	8.875	9.387	9.612	9.625	9.275	9.612	9.562	9.525	75.473
7	Sonia Fraguas	9.625	9.562	8.900	9.300	9.512	9.675	9.787	9.100	75.461
7	Elena Romero	9.562	9.537	8.762	9.662	8.962	9.687	9.562	9.487	75.221
8	Hungary	96.515		95.572		94.697		96.784		383.388
8	Henrietta Ónodi	9.850	9.900	9.962	9.900	9.812	9.850	9.900	9.937	79.111
8	Andrea Molnár	9.562	9.867	9.450	9.362	9.062	9.562	9.500	9.712	75.897
8	Eszter Óváry	9.575	9.637	9.287	9.237	9.287	9.450	9.537	9.712	75.722
8	Bernadett Balázs	9.487	9.525	9.162	9.512	9.137	9.400	9.487	9.612	75.322
8	ldikó Balog	9.412	9.550	9.350	9.462	9.025	9.350	9.475	9.612	75.236
8	Krisztina Molnár	0.000	9.675	9.575	9.712	9.512	9.625	9.750	9.637	67.486

=== All-around ===
Rank	Gymnast	Vault (gymnastics)	Uneven bars	Balance beam	Floor (gymnastics)	Total
1st place, gold medalist(s)	Kim Zmeskal (USA)	9.962	9.937	9.962	9.987	39.848
2nd place, silver medalist(s)	Svetlana Boginskaya (URS)	9.962	9.912	9.912	9.950	39.736
3rd place, bronze medalist(s)	Cristina Bontaș (ROU)	9.887	9.912	9.975	9.937	39.711
4	Betty Okino (USA)	9.937	9.900	9.912	9.912	39.661
5	Tatiana Gutsu (URS)	9.875	9.937	9.912	9.912	39.636
6	Shannon Miller (USA)	9.912	9.950	9.862	9.862	39.586
7	Lavinia Miloșovici (ROU)	9.937	9.900	9.700	9.937	39.474
8	Mirela Pașca (ROU)	9.887	9.925	9.887	9.637	39.336
9	Li Li (CHN)	9.712	9.912	9.862	9.750	39.236
10	Shi Liying (CHN)	9.675	9.900	9.862	9.750	39.187
11	Maja Hristova (BUL)	9.737	9.812	9.775	9.862	39.186
12	Mari Kosuge (JPN)	9.775	9.787	9.800	9.812	39.174
13	Tatiana Lysenko (URS)	9.875	9.937	9.412	9.937	39.161
14	Li Yifang (CHN)	9.737	9.900	9.662	9.850	39.149
15	Silvia Martínez (ESP)	9.875	9.837	9.687	9.725	39.124
16	Silvia Mitova (BUL)	9.812	9.850	9.562	9.887	39.111
17	Stella Umeh (CAN)	9.812	9.712	9.737	9.750	39.011
18	Kim Gwang-suk (PRK)	9.637	9.962	9.650	9.737	38.986
19	Joanna Hughes (AUS)	9.737	9.862	9.587	9.737	38.923
20	Karine Boucher (FRA)	9.700	9.725	9.712	9.737	38.874
21	Monique Allen (AUS)	9.662	9.850	9.687	9.662	38.861
22	Li Chun-mi (PRK)	9.662	9.887	9.725	9.512	38.836
23	Choi Gyong-hui (PRK)	9.662	9.875	9.537	9.687	38.761
24	Park Ji-sook (KOR)	9.650	9.587	9.712	9.800	38.749
25	Miriam de Tena (ESP)	9.725	9.825	9.775	9.412	38.737
26	Kathleen Stark (GER)	9.662	9.612	9.650	9.625	38.549
27	Elvira Becks (NED)	9.737	9.625	9.212	9.737	38.331
28	Svetlana Ivanova (BUL)	9.762	8.987	9.700	9.825	38.274
29	Kylie Shadbolt (AUS)	9.650	9.725	9.112	9.775	38.262
30	Iveta Poloková (TCH)	9.600	9.700	9.725	9.162	38.187
31	Henrietta Ónodi (HUN)	9.912	8.875	9.337	9.950	38.074
32	Annette Potempa (GER)	9.625	9.762	9.025	9.550	37.962
33	Daniela Bártová (TCH)	9.137	9.637	9.387	9.637	37.798
34	Eva Rueda (ESP)	9.862	9.062	9.237	9.325	37.486
35	Virginie Machado (FRA)	9.362	9.250	9.587	9.175	37.374
36	Giulia Volpi (ITA)	9.475	9.700	9.125	8.412	36.712

=== Vault Final ===
Rank	Gymnast	Total
1st place, gold medalist(s)	Lavinia Miloșovici (ROU)	9.949
2nd place, silver medalist(s)	Oksana Chusovitina (URS)	9.918
2nd place, silver medalist(s)	Henrietta Ónodi (HUN)	9.918
4	Cristina Bontaș (ROU)	9.881
5	Svetlana Boginskaya (URS)	9.850
6	Shannon Miller (USA)	9.812
7	Kim Zmeskal (USA)	9.700
8	Li Yan (CHN)	9.625

=== Uneven Bars ===
Rank	Gymnast	Total
1st place, gold medalist(s)	Kim Gwang-suk (PRK)	10.000
2nd place, silver medalist(s)	Tatiana Gutsu (URS)	9.950
2nd place, silver medalist(s)	Shannon Miller (USA)	9.950
4	Henrietta Ónodi (HUN)	9.937
4	Mirela Pașca (ROU)	9.937
6	Li Li (CHN)	9.925
7	Cristina Bontaș (ROU)	9.862
8	Tatiana Lysenko (URS)	8.200

=== Balance Beam ===
Rank	Gymnast	Total
1st place, gold medalist(s)	Svetlana Boginskaya (URS)	9.962
2nd place, silver medalist(s)	Tatiana Gutsu (URS)	9.950
3rd place, bronze medalist(s)	Lavinia Miloșovici (ROU)	9.900
3rd place, bronze medalist(s)	Betty Okino (USA)	9.900
5	Yang Bo (CHN)	9.887
6	Shannon Miller (USA)	9.862
7	Henrietta Ónodi (HUN)	9.600
8	Cristina Bontaș (ROU)	9.412

=== Floor Exercise ===
Rank	Gymnast	Total
1st place, gold medalist(s)	Cristina Bontaș (ROU)	9.962
1st place, gold medalist(s)	Oksana Chusovitina (URS)	9.962
3rd place, bronze medalist(s)	Kim Zmeskal (USA)	9.950
4	Shannon Miller (USA)	9.925
4	Lavinia Miloșovici (ROU)	9.925
6	Silvia Mitova (BUL)	9.887
7	Svetlana Boginskaya (URS)	9.862
8	Henrietta Ónodi (HUN)	9.387

== Medals ==
=== Overall ===
Rank	Nation	Gold	Silver	Bronze	Total
1	Soviet Union (URS)	8	8	2	18
2	China (CHN)	2	2	2	6
3	Romania (ROU)	2	0	3	5
4	United States (USA)	1	2	2	5
5	Germany (GER)	1	1	1	3
6	North Korea (PRK)	1	0	0	1
6	South Korea (KOR)	1	0	0	1
8	Hungary (HUN)	0	1	0	1
9	Japan (JPN)	0	0	2	2
10	Italy (ITA)	0	0	1	1
Totals (10 entries)		16	14	13	43

=== Men ===
Rank	Nation	Gold	Silver	Bronze	Total
1	Soviet Union	5	4	2	11
2	China	2	2	2	6
3	Germany	1	1	1	3
4	South Korea	1	0	0	1
5	Japan	0	0	2	2
6	Italy	0	0	1	1
Totals (6 entries)		9	7	8	24

=== Women ===
Rank	Nation	Gold	Silver	Bronze	Total
1	Soviet Union	3	4	0	7
2	Romania	2	0	3	5
3	United States	1	2	2	5
4	North Korea	1	0	0	1
5	Hungary	0	1	0	1
Totals (5 entries)		7	7	5	19
