= Pak Gyong-sil =

North Korean gymnast

- Born: 1 February 1975
- Died: 16 July 2006 (aged 31)

Gymnastics career
- Discipline: Women's artistic gymnastics
- Country represented: North Korea
- Eponymous skills: Pak salto

Korean name
- Hangul: 박경실
- RR: Bak Gyeongsil
- MR: Pak Kyŏngsil

Pak Gyong-sil (1 February 1975 – 16 July 2006) was a North Korean artistic gymnast. She competed at the 1992 Summer Olympics and at three Artistic Gymnastics World Championships. She introduced the Pak salto on the uneven bars.

== Gymnastics career ==
Pak made her World Championships debut in 1989, where she also first competed the Pak salto to have the move named after her. She helped the North Korean team finish seventh and placed 50th in the individual all-around qualifications. At the 1991 World Championships, she competed with the North Korean team that finished ninth. She also competed at the 1992 World Championships, which were an individual World Championships without a team competition. She advanced into the uneven bars semifinals, where she placed tenth with a score of 9.787. She also competed on the balance beam but did not advance beyond the preliminary round.

Pak was selected to represent North Korea at the 1992 Summer Olympics alongside An Myong-hwa, Choi Gyong-hui, Hwang Bo-sil, Kim Gwang-suk, and Ri Chun-mi. She competed on all four apparatuses in the compulsory round and on the vault and uneven bars in the optional round, helping North Korea finish eleventh out of the twelve qualified teams. She did not advance into any individual finals. This was the final international competition of Pak's career, as the North Korean women's national team did not compete during the 1993–1996 Olympic cycle after being caught falsifying Kim Gwang-suk's age.

=== Eponymous skill ===
The Pak salto is named after Pak in the Code of Points. The Pak salto is a commonly-used transition move on the uneven bars to get from the high bar to the low bar. She first debuted the move at the 1989 World Championships.

Apparatus	Name	Description	Difficulty (Note: Valid for the 2025-2028 Code of Points)
Uneven bars	Pak	Hang on high bar, facing low bar - swing forward, salto backward stretched between bars to clear support on low bar	D

== Post-gymnastics ==
Pak was the Secretary of the Central Committee of the Korean Dancers Union. She died in 2006.
