= Mirela Pașca =

Romanian artistic gymnast

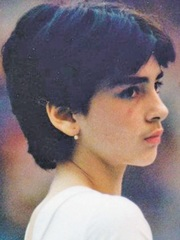

Personal information
- Born: 19 February 1975 (age 51) Baia Mare, Romania

Gymnastics career
- Discipline: Women's artistic gymnastics
- Country represented: Romania
- Head coach: Octavian Bellu
- Former coaches: Elena Marinescu, Alexandru Aldea, Iuliana Simonfi
- Retired: 1992
Medal record
Olympic Games
Silver medal – second place	1992 Barcelona	Team
World Championships
Bronze medal – third place	1991 Indianapolis	Team
Bronze medal – third place	1992 Paris	Uneven bars
World Cup Final
Silver medal – second place	1990 Brussels	Uneven bars
Bronze medal – third place	1990 Brussels	Floor exercise
European Championships
Gold medal – first place	1990 Athens	Uneven bars

Mirela Ana Pașca (born 19 February 1975) is a Romanian retired artistic gymnast, who competed internationally between 1990 and 1992. She is an Olympic silver medalist and a world bronze medalist with the team. Individually, she is a world bronze medalist and a European champion on uneven bars. She was also an uneven bars finalist at the 1992 Olympic Games.

== Career ==
Mirela started to train for gymnastics at the age of 5 at the Baia-Mare Sport Club, under the direction of Adriana and Nelu Pop (who also coached Ludivine Furnon).

In 1990 she joined the national Romanian team. In the same year she tied for gold on the uneven bars with Svetlana Boginskaya and Natalia Kalinina at the European Championships in Athens, Greece.

At the 26th World Gymnastics Championships 1991, Indianapolis, United States she won bronze with the team and placed 8th in the all around event. Mirela also tied for the fourth place on the uneven bars with Henrietta Ónodi in a final in which the bronze medal was not rewarded. One year later she managed to win a bronze medal for uneven bars at the 1992 World Championships.

Together with Lavinia Miloșovici, Gina Gogean, Cristina Bontaș, Vanda Hădărean, and Maria Neculiță, Mirela was a member of the Romanian team at the 1992 Summer Olympics Barcelona, Spain. In Barcelona she won silver with the team and tied for the fourth place for the uneven bars with Lavinia Miloșovici and Kim Gwang Suk.

== Retirement ==
Mirela's last competition was the 1992 DTB cup. After that she graduated in physical education from the Bucharest Ecological University. During her studies she was a member of the aerobic gymnastics team of the university coached by Gineta Stoenescu. In 1996 she won the silver medal for individual women and for mixed pairs (together with her future husband Octavian Romas) at the first Romanian National Aerobic Gymnastics Championships.

In 1997 she left for Spain to become the new gymnastics coach of the Real Grupo de Cultura Covadonga club, based in Gijón.

Mirela returned to Romania to open in 2006 her own fitness and aerobic club.
