= Cristina Bontaș =

Romanian artistic gymnast (born 1973)

Cristina Bontaş
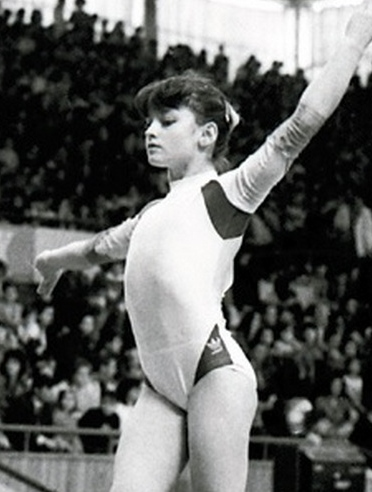

Personal information
- Born: December 5, 1973 (age 52) Ştefan cel Mare, Bacău, Romania

Gymnastics career
- Discipline: Women's artistic gymnastics
- Country represented: Romania; (1987–92 (ROM))
- Head coach: Octavian Bellu
- Former coaches: Dorin and Mihai Săndulescu
- Retired: 1993
Medal record
Olympic Games
Silver medal – second place	1992 Barcelona	Team
Bronze medal – third place	1992 Barcelona	Floor exercise
World Championships
Gold medal – first place	1991 Indianapolis	Floor exercise
Silver medal – second place	1989 Stuttgart	Team
Silver medal – second place	1989 Stuttgart	Vault
Bronze medal – third place	1989 Stuttgart	Floor exercise
Bronze medal – third place	1991 Indianapolis	Team
Bronze medal – third place	1991 Indianapolis	All-around
World Cup Final
Bronze medal – third place	1990 Brussels	Balance beam
European Championships
Silver medal – second place	1990 Athens	Vault
Bronze medal – third place	1989 Brussels	Vault
Bronze medal – third place	1989 Brussels	Floor exercise

Cristina Bontaş (later Tăntaru, born December 5, 1973) is a Romanian former artistic gymnast, who competed in international events between 1987 and 1993. Her best events were the floor exercise, the vault, and the all around. She is a world champion on floor, a double olympic medalist and a six-time world medalist. Bontaş scored a perfect ten on floor in the all around event of the 1989 World Artistic Gymnastics Championships.

== Early life ==
She started training at the age of seven at the CSM Oneşti club under coaches Dorin and Mihai Săndulescu. She had a successful junior career, medaling in various competitions. In 1987, her debut at a major international event (International Japan Junior Invitational) brought her four medals, one gold for vault and three silver for the all-around, uneven bars, and floor. At the 1988 Junior European Championships in Avignon, France, she won bronze in the all-around event, and she managed a fifth place on vault and a seventh place on floor. The 1988 Junior Friendship Tournament (Druzhba) was another especially successful meet: she won gold for floor, bronze for balance beam and vault, and finished fourth in the all-around. Despite her successful junior career she was the second and therefore the non traveling alternate for the team at the 1988 Olympics.

== Senior career ==
=== 1989–1990 ===
Bontaş' debut as a senior in an international event was at the 1989 Romanian Internationals, where she medaled silver for all-around, uneven bars, and floor and bronze for vault. 1989 was the start of a series of medals for floor and vault in international events. Bontaş was the surprise top Romanian gymnast at the 1989 World Championships, finishing in fourth place in the all-around event ahead of the great Daniela Silivaş and just behind the trio of Soviet medalists (Boginskaya, Laschenova and Strazheva). In the all-around event, she scored a perfect 10 for the floor exercise. She won bronze on floor and tied for silver on vault with Brandy Johnson. Bontaş also contributed to the team's silver medal by achieving the third highest average score on her team.

In 1990 she won a silver medal on vault at the European Championships in Athens, Greece and placed seventh in the floor and uneven bars events.

=== 1991 ===
At the 1991 World Championships in Indianapolis, United States Bontaş tied for gold for floor with Oksana Chusovitina. Her performance on the floor exercise based on a musical background of well-known American songs (e.g., "The Star-Spangled Banner" (USA anthem), "Oh Susanna", "When Johnny Comes Marching Home Again", "Yankee Doodle" and "Deep in the Heart of Texas") energized the crowds. She also won the bronze medal on the all-around event, contributed heavily to the team bronze with the highest average score on her team and placed fourth on vault, seventh on uneven bars and eight on balance beam.

=== 1992 Olympic Games ===
Together with Lavinia Miloşovici, Gina Gogean, Mirela Paşca, Vanda Hădărean, and Maria Neculiţă, Bontaş was a team member of the Romanian team at the 1992 Olympics in Barcelona, Spain. In the team finals, she had once again the highest contributing score of all her colleagues, highlighted by an average of 9.95 on the floor exercise. She qualified first in the floor finals, third all around, and fifth in the balance beam finals. She won silver with the team, tied for the bronze medal on floor exercise with Tatiana Gutsu and Shannon Miller, and placed fourth in the all-around and beam finals.

== Post-retirement ==
Bontaş retired after the 1992 Olympic Games. She first coached in Romania and did some TV commentary for gymnastics events. Later, she coached in Italy and in Wales. When the contract in Wales was up, Bontaş immigrated to Canada to coach at Hamilton's Mountain Star Gymnastics. She went back to Romania in 1998 to marry, returning to Canada without her husband, Gabi Tăntaru, while they waited for immigration papers. After several months, her husband was able to join her in Canada; he was also coaching at Hamilton Mountain Gym Elites (formerly Mountain Star Gymnastics). The couple has a daughter named Elissa, also a gymnast, born in April 1999, and a son Eric, born in April 2002.

In September 2003, Bontaş and her husband opened their own gymnastics club in Hamilton, World Class Gymnastics. Here, Bontaş was training her pupils for the 2012 Olympic Games. Bontaş also recently started an aerobic gymnastics program at her gym which has produced many national team members.

== Competitive history ==
Year	Event	Team	AA	VT	UB	BB	FX
Junior
1986	Cottbus International					1st place, gold medalist(s)	
Senior
1987	Blume Memorial		5				
1987	International Junior Championships		2nd place, silver medalist(s)	1st place, gold medalist(s)	2nd place, silver medalist(s)		1st place, gold medalist(s)
1987	Junior Friendship Tournament	1st place, gold medalist(s)	3rd place, bronze medalist(s)	3rd place, bronze medalist(s)		1st place, gold medalist(s)	3rd place, bronze medalist(s)
1987	Kosice International		1st place, gold medalist(s)	4	2nd place, silver medalist(s)	1st place, gold medalist(s)	5
1988	Balkan Championships	1st place, gold medalist(s)	1st place, gold medalist(s)				
1988	Catania Cup		3rd place, bronze medalist(s)	2nd place, silver medalist(s)	1st place, gold medalist(s)		2nd place, silver medalist(s)
1988	Champions All		1st place, gold medalist(s)				
1988	Junior European Championships		3rd place, bronze medalist(s)	5			7
1988	Junior Friendship Tournament	2nd place, silver medalist(s)	4	3rd place, bronze medalist(s)	8	3rd place, bronze medalist(s)	1st place, gold medalist(s)
1989	Chunichi Cup		3rd place, bronze medalist(s)				
1989	CSSR-ROM Dual Meet	1st place, gold medalist(s)	1st place, gold medalist(s)				
1989	European Championships		9	3rd place, bronze medalist(s)			3rd place, bronze medalist(s)
1989	French International		3rd place, bronze medalist(s)	5	4		4
1989	International Championships of Romania		2nd place, silver medalist(s)				
1989	ROM-CSSR Dual Meet	1st place, gold medalist(s)	1st place, gold medalist(s)				
1989	Rome Grand Prix		1st place, gold medalist(s)				
1989	Tokyo Cup			2nd place, silver medalist(s)			7
1989	World Championships	2nd place, silver medalist(s)	4	2nd place, silver medalist(s)			3rd place, bronze medalist(s)
1990	Blume Memorial		11				
1990	DTB Cup		4	3rd place, bronze medalist(s)		3rd place, bronze medalist(s)	2nd place, silver medalist(s)
1990	European Championships		7	2nd place, silver medalist(s)	7		7
1990	French International		19				
1990	GBR-ROM Dual Meet	1st place, gold medalist(s)	3rd place, bronze medalist(s)				
1990	HUN-ROM Dual Meet	1st place, gold medalist(s)	3rd place, bronze medalist(s)				
1990	International Championships of Romania		2nd place, silver medalist(s)				
1990	Romanian Championships		1st place, gold medalist(s)	2nd place, silver medalist(s)		1st place, gold medalist(s)	2nd place, silver medalist(s)
1990	ROM-TCH Dual Meet	1st place, gold medalist(s)	2nd place, silver medalist(s)				
1990	World Cup Final		6	7	7	3rd place, bronze medalist(s)	7
1991	BEL-FRA-ROM-URS Meet		1st place, gold medalist(s)				
1991	Chunichi Cup		3rd place, bronze medalist(s)			2nd place, silver medalist(s)	2nd place, silver medalist(s)
1991	DTB Cup		4	2nd place, silver medalist(s)	3rd place, bronze medalist(s)		1st place, gold medalist(s)
1991	Dutch Open		4	1st place, gold medalist(s)		1st place, gold medalist(s)	1st place, gold medalist(s)
1991	Romanian Championships					1st place, gold medalist(s)	1st place, gold medalist(s)
1991	ROM-GER Dual Meet	1st place, gold medalist(s)	1st place, gold medalist(s)				
1991	ROM-ITA Dual Meet	1st place, gold medalist(s)	2nd place, silver medalist(s)				
1991	Tokyo Cup					2nd place, silver medalist(s)	2nd place, silver medalist(s)
1991	USA-ROM Dual Meet		7				
1991	World Championships	3rd place, bronze medalist(s)	3rd place, bronze medalist(s)	4	7	8	1st place, gold medalist(s)
1992	Chunichi Cup		2nd place, silver medalist(s)	2nd place, silver medalist(s)	6		1st place, gold medalist(s)
1992	FRA-ROM Dual Meet	1st place, gold medalist(s)	3rd place, bronze medalist(s)				
1992	HUN-ROM Dual Meet	1st place, gold medalist(s)	3rd place, bronze medalist(s)				
1992	Romanian Championships	2nd place, silver medalist(s)	4			4	3rd place, bronze medalist(s)
1992	ROM-GER Dual Meet	1st place, gold medalist(s)	1st place, gold medalist(s)				
1992	Tokyo Cup			1st place, gold medalist(s)	3rd place, bronze medalist(s)	2nd place, silver medalist(s)	
1992	Olympic Games	2nd place, silver medalist(s)	4			4	3rd place, bronze medalist(s)
