= Kerri Strug =

American Olympic gymnast (born 1977)

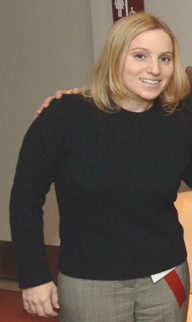
- Strug in 2007

Personal information
- Full name: Kerri Allyson Strug
- Born: November 19, 1977 (age 48) Tucson, Arizona, U.S.
- Height: 4 ft 8 in (142 cm)
- Spouse: Robert Fischer (m. 2010)

Gymnastics career
Medal record
Women's artistic gymnastics
Representing the United States
Olympic Games
Gold medal – first place	1996 Atlanta	Team
Bronze medal – third place	1992 Barcelona	Team
World Championships
Silver medal – second place	1991 Indianapolis	Team
Silver medal – second place	1994 Dortmund	Team
Bronze medal – third place	1995 Sabae	Team

Kerri Allyson Strug (born November 19, 1977) is an American retired gymnast from Tucson, Arizona. She was a member of the Magnificent Seven, the victorious all-around women's gymnastics team that represented the United States at the 1996 Summer Olympics. Strug performed the vault that clinched the gold for the U.S. team despite having injured her ankle.

== Gymnastics career ==
=== Pre-1996 Olympics ===
Strug began training in gymnastics at the age of three. She began competing in gymnastics at the age of eight. Her sister Lisa was already competing in gymnastics at the time that Strug was born. Strug was trained by American coach Jim Gault until January 1991, when she moved to Houston, Texas, to train with coach Béla Károlyi. At that time, she also joined the United States National Team. In 1992, as the youngest member of the entire U.S. team at age 14, she won a team bronze medal at the Barcelona Olympics. Throughout the Team Compulsories and Optionals, she and Kim Zmeskal competed for the final US available spot to compete in the all-around. She was eventually edged out by Zmeskal, with Shannon Miller and Betty Okino as the other two American gymnasts to qualify for the all-around.

After the 1992 Games, Strug chose to move to Edmond, Oklahoma, to train under the coaching of Steve Nunno at the Dynamo Gymnastics Club, where she trained with Shannon Miller. There, she struggled with a serious injury to her stomach.

At the 1993 Nationals, Strug placed 3rd in the all-around, 2nd on the uneven bars, and 3rd on floor exercise. She completed the Yurchenko ½ vault. However, she had a weak second vault and did not medal in that event. After this competition, Strug left Edmond to return home to Tucson, Arizona, where she trained with Arthur Akopian, who flew in from California to train her, with the assistance of Jim Gault. Gault was Strug's coach when she started gymnastics at age 3.

While performing the compulsory uneven bars set in 1994, she pinged off the bar, subsequently releasing too early to be able to make the transition to low bar. She lost control and flew off the high bar backwards, landing in a twisted position on her side beneath the low bar. She was carried out of the gym on a stretcher and was taken to Desert Regional Hospital. The injury turned out to be a badly pulled back muscle, which required extensive rehabilitation. She recovered in time for the 1994 World Championships.

In 1995, Strug graduated from Green Fields Country Day School in Tucson, Arizona. Eventually, the coaching arrangement with Gault and Akopian became untenable as Gault was restricted in his coaching by NCAA recruiting rules. Strug once again left home, in July 1995, to train at Aerials Gymnastics in Colorado Springs, Colorado, with Tom and Lori Forster. Later that year, at the 1995 Nationals, Strug placed 5th in the all-around and came in 3rd on the uneven bars. At the 1995 World Championships, she was a member of the bronze medal-winning U.S. team, and she placed 7th in the all-around.

She trained with the Forsters from July 1995 until December 1995. She then moved back to Houston to train with Károlyi again in preparation for the 1996 Olympics. She beat the competition at the 1996 American Cup in the all-around by almost a half point, a huge margin with the scoring system at that time. She also placed 1st on floor exercises and balance beam and 2nd on vault and uneven bars in the event finals. At the 1996 U.S. Nationals, Strug placed 5th in the all-around and came in 2nd on both vault and floor.

=== 1996 Olympics ===
Strug participated in the 1996 Olympics as a member of the U.S. women's team, often referred to as the Magnificent Seven. After compulsories, Strug was ranked 9th overall and had placed high enough to qualify herself for the all-around. She posted the second-highest score on floor exercise—but qualified first in floor exercise event finals after the team final and ahead of eventual floor exercise gold medalist Lilia Podkopayeva—and fourth-highest on vault, which would qualify her for event finals in her two strongest events. In the team competition, an event dominated by the Soviets for decades and never won by the United States, the U.S. competed with the Russian, Romanian, and Ukrainian teams. The Russians came into the team competition with a very narrow lead. The event came down to the final rotation on the final day of the team competition, July 23, 1996.

Going into the final rotation, with the Russians on floor exercise and the U.S. on vault, the U.S. women held a commanding 0.897-point lead over the Russian team. However, it was still possible for the Russians to take the gold if the U.S. women collapsed. The first four U.S. gymnasts landed their vaults, but struggled to land them cleanly, taking steps and hops. Adding to the drama, Strug's teammate Dominique Moceanu fell twice, registering a poor score. Strug was the last to vault for the United States.

Strug under-rotated her first attempt, causing her to fall and injure her ankle. As a result, the attempt was awarded 9.162 points. Russian gymnast Elena Dolgopolova finished her floor routine about 10 seconds after Strug sat her first vault, with 1994 floor world champion Dina Kochetkova and reigning Russian national floor champion Roza Galieva still to perform their routines. Moceanu's score (9.200) may have been sufficient to beat the Russians if Strug did not perform a second vault. However, with the top two Russian floor workers left to perform, and Dolgopolova's score yet to be posted, the Russian team could have won gold if those last three scores averaged over 9.816. Strug, Moceanu, Dominique Dawes, Romanian gymnasts Simona Amânar and Gina Gogean, and Chinese gymnast Ji Liya had all received floor scores of 9.825 or higher earlier that night. After leading the entire night, the U.S. was at risk of losing to Russia, and Strug needed a second vault score of 9.762 to mathematically clinch the gold.

In the time interval between Strug's two vaults, she asked, "Do we need this?" Károlyi replied, "Kerri, we need you to go one more time. We need you one more time for the gold. You can do it, you better do it." Strug thus limped slightly to the end of the runway to make her second attempt. She landed the vault briefly on both feet, almost instantly hopping onto only her uninjured foot, saluting the judges. She then collapsed onto her knees and needed assistance off the landing platform, to which sportscaster John Tesh commented, "Kerri Strug is hurt! She is hurt badly." The completed vault received a score of 9.712. As Strug landed the second vault, Dolgopalova's 9.750 floor score was posted, making Strug's 9.712 enough to guarantee the Americans the gold medal.

The rest of the Magnificent Seven refused to walk out to the medal ceremony without Strug, and eventually Béla Károlyi carried her onto the medals podium to join her team, after which she was treated at a hospital for a third-degree lateral sprain and tendon damage. Due to her injury, she was unable to compete in the individual all-around competition and event finals, despite having qualified for both. This allowed her teammates who had qualified for finals, but were eliminated due to rules limiting the number of gymnasts per country, to take Strug's place. Moceanu replaced Strug in the all-around, Dawes took her place in the floor final, and Shannon Miller took her place in the vault final.

Strug became a national sports hero for her final vault, visiting President Bill Clinton, appearing at various television talk shows, making the cover of Sports Illustrated and appearing on a Wheaties cereal box with other team members. Actor Chris Kattan notably parodied her adolescent-sounding voice (as her "brother" Kippi Strug), and appeared on Saturday Night Live (in a segment in which she appeared alongside him). ESPN's "This is SportsCenter" ad campaign poked good-natured fun at her injury with two ads featuring various ESPN workers carrying her around.

== Professional career and college ==
Shortly after her feat, Strug participated in the Ice Capades and Disney's World On Ice, then announced her retirement and enrolled in UCLA, where she was a member of the Kappa Alpha Theta women's fraternity. As a professional, she could not compete in NCAA gymnastics events, so she worked for a time as team manager instead, a behind-the-scenes role. She later transferred to Stanford University where she earned a master's degree in social psychology. Strug also took part in a Semester at Sea in the fall of 2000.

Strug was a member of the Junior League of Washington, D.C.

== After gymnastics ==
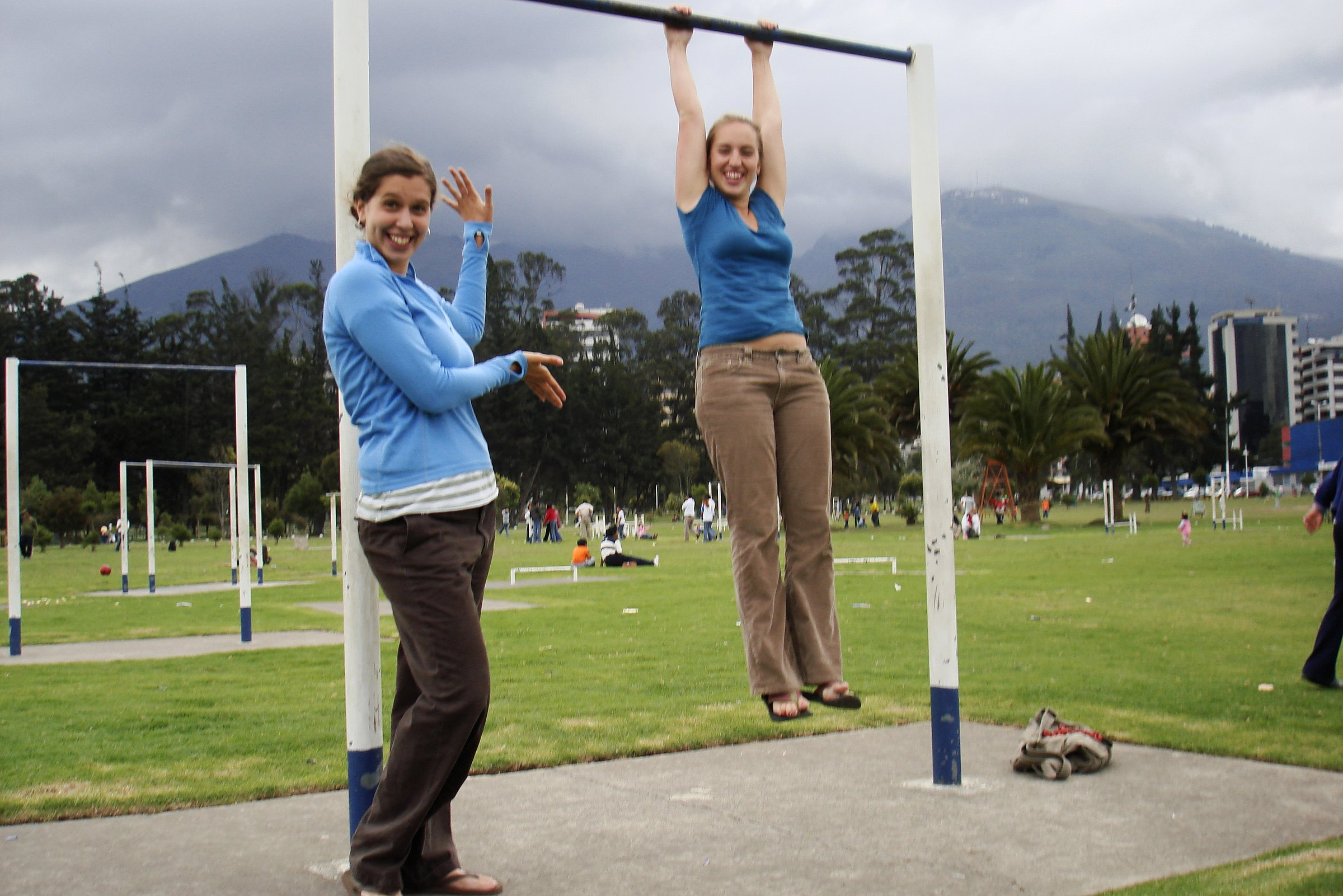
Strug in 2007

At the 1997 Maccabiah Games in Israel, Strug was honored as a final torchbearer who jointly lit the flame with Israeli basketball legend Miki Berkovich to officially open the event.

In 2000, she was inducted into the International Jewish Sports Hall of Fame.

After graduation, Strug worked as an elementary school teacher at Tom Matsumoto Elementary School in San Jose, California, before moving to Washington, D.C. in 2003.

She worked as a staff assistant with the White House Office of Presidential Student Correspondence, moved to a job at the General Counsel in the Treasury Department, and in March 2005, joined the Justice Department's Office of Juvenile Justice and Delinquency Prevention staff as a presidential appointee. Strug has competed in marathons in Houston, New York, Boston and Chicago.

During the 2004 Summer Olympics in Athens, Strug was a correspondent for Yahoo! in artistic gymnastics. In 2008, she appeared in a television commercial for the Zaxby's restaurant chain. Also in 2008, her history-making ordeal at the 1996 Olympic Games was featured in a commercial, narrated by actor Morgan Freeman for the "Go World" campaign.

== Personal life ==
Strug was born in Tucson, Arizona, the daughter of Melanie Barron and Dr. Burt Strug, a cardiovascular surgeon. Strug is Jewish. She married attorney Robert Fischer at the Skyline Country Club in Tucson, Arizona, on April 25, 2010. In March 2012, Strug gave birth to a son. In 2014, she gave birth to a daughter.

== Competition history ==
Year	Event	TF	AA	VT	UB	BB	FX
Junior
1990	American Classic		1st place, gold medalist(s)				
1990	Junior Pan American Games		1st place, gold medalist(s)				
1990	U.S. Championships		4				
1990	Dutch Open		3rd place, bronze medalist(s)				
Senior
1991	Buckeye Classic		1st place, gold medalist(s)				
1991	USA-ROM Dual Meet		8				
1991	Alamo Invitational		4				
1991	U.S. Championships		3rd place, bronze medalist(s)	1st place, gold medalist(s)	3rd place, bronze medalist(s)	4	5
1991	World Championships	2nd place, silver medalist(s)					
1992	Alamo Invitational		3rd place, bronze medalist(s)				
1992	International Mixed Pairs	12					
1992	World Championships			6	7		
1992	U.S. Championships		2nd place, silver medalist(s)	1st place, gold medalist(s)	4	1st place, gold medalist(s)	2nd place, silver medalist(s)
1992	U.S. Olympic Trials		3rd place, bronze medalist(s)				
1992	Olympic Games	3rd place, bronze medalist(s)					
1993	American Cup		2nd place, silver medalist(s)				
1993	International Mixed Pairs	2nd place, silver medalist(s)					
1993	USA-BLR-UKR Meet	1st place, gold medalist(s)	7				
1993	Gander Memorial		4				
1993	American Classic		1st place, gold medalist(s)				
1993	Swiss Cup	10					
1993	U.S. Championships		3rd place, bronze medalist(s)	4	2nd place, silver medalist(s)		3rd place, bronze medalist(s)
1993	U.S. Olympic Festival		2nd place, silver medalist(s)		1st place, gold medalist(s)	2nd place, silver medalist(s)	2nd place, silver medalist(s)
1993	World Championships			5			6
1994
1994	Team World Championships	2nd place, silver medalist(s)					
1995	U.S. Olympic Festival		1st place, gold medalist(s)		1st place, gold medalist(s)	3rd place, bronze medalist(s)	
1995	U.S. Championships		5		3rd place, bronze medalist(s)		4
1995	U.S. World Trials		4				
1995	World Championships	3rd place, bronze medalist(s)	7				
1996	American Cup		1st place, gold medalist(s)			1st place, gold medalist(s)	1st place, gold medalist(s)
1996	International Mixed Pairs	4					
1996	U.S. Championships		5	2nd place, silver medalist(s)			2nd place, silver medalist(s)
1996	U.S. Olympic Trials		4				
1996	Olympic Games	1st place, gold medalist(s)					

== See also ==
- List of select Jewish gymnasts
- List of Jewish Olympic medalists
- List of Olympic female gymnasts for the United States
