= Maria Neculiță =

Romanian artistic gymnast (born 1974)

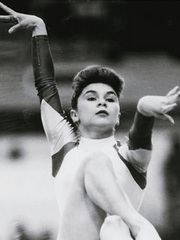

Personal information
- Born: 30 March 1974 (age 52) Hunedoara, Romania

Gymnastics career
- Discipline: Women's artistic gymnastics
- Country represented: Romania (1987–92 (ROM))
- Head coaches: Adrian Goreac, Adrian Stan
- Assistant coach: Octavian Bellu
Medal record
Olympic Games
Silver medal – second place	1992 Barcelona	Team
World Championships
Silver medal – second place	1992 Paris	Balance beam
Bronze medal – third place	1991 Indianapolis	Team
Bronze medal – third place	1992 Paris	Floor
European Championships
Bronze medal – third place	1990 Athens	Balance beam

Maria Neculiță (born 30 March 1974) is a Romanian artistic gymnast who competed in international events between 1988 and 1992. Her best events were the floor and the beam. She won the team silver medal at the 1992 Olympics and team bronze at the 1991 World Championships. Individually, she won silver on beam and bronze on floor at the 1992 Worlds and a continental bronze on beam in 1990.

== Career ==
Neculiță started gymnastics at the age of eight at Cetate Deva Gymnastics Club. In 1987 she was selected for the senior national team trained by coaches Octavian Belu.

Her international debut as a senior was at the 1988 Moscow news where she medaled bronze on the floor exercise and placed sixth all around and on the uneven bars. In 1990 she competed in her first major international competition, the 1990, European Championships in Athens. There she won bronze on the balance beam, and she placed fifth on floor and sixth all-around.

Neculiță won the bronze medal with the team at the 1991 World Championships. The team showed a good performance in the team optionals but, together with Eugenia Popa, Maria was heavily criticized by the press and by coach Belu for having let the crowd interfere with their performance during the team compulsories. At this competition Maria did not qualify in any of the final events

However, one year later she had one of her best meets at the 1992 World Championships, tying for silver on beam with Li Yifang and for bronze on floor with Tatiana Lysenko. Her floor routine showed musicality, style and world class tumbling, establishing her as one of the medal contenders on floor for the 1992 Olympic Games. In 1992 she also tied with Gina Gogean for the all around title and won the floor title at the 1992 International Championships of Romania.

Together with Lavinia Miloșovici, Gina Gogean, Mirela Paşca, Vanda Hădărean, and Cristina Bontaș, Maria was a member of the silver winning Romanian team at the 1992 Summer Olympics Barcelona, Spain. Unfortunately, in the qualifications for the floor and beam finals she placed seventeenth and sixteenth, respectively. Therefore, she did not compete in the final events. Instead, her teammates Miloșovici and Bontaș won the gold and the bronze in the floor final, respectively.

Her last competition was the 1992 Balkan games where she won the all around (ahead of Gina Gogean), the floor and beam finals and finished second on bars.

== Post-retirement ==
Neculiță retired in 1992. In 1995 she went to Italy to coach at the Nuoro at the Centro Sportivo Osaka club.
