= Mike Inglis (gymnast) =

Canadian gymnast

- Full name: Michael T. Inglis
- Born: 30 October 1966 (age 59) Cobourg, Ontario, Canada

Gymnastics career
- Discipline: Men's artistic gymnastics
- Country represented: Canada

Michael T. Inglis (born 30 October 1966) is a Canadian gymnast. He competed in seven events at the 1992 Summer Olympics.
