= Jane Warrilow =

Australian gymnast

Personal information
- Nationality: Australian
- Born: 27 July 1973 (age 51)

Sport
- Sport: Gymnastics

Jane Warrilow (born 27 July 1973) is an Australian gymnast. She competed in six events at the 1992 Summer Olympics.
