= Brooke Gysen =

Australian gymnast

Personal information
- Nationality: Australian
- Born: 19 September 1977 (age 48)

Sport
- Sport: Gymnastics

Brooke Gysen (born 19 September 1977) is an Australian gymnast. She competed in six events at the 1992 Summer Olympics.
