= Veronica Servente =

Italian gymnast

Personal information
- Nationality: Italian
- Born: 9 March 1977 (age 48); Turin, Italy

Sport
- Sport: Gymnastics

Veronica Servente (born 9 March 1977) is an Italian gymnast. She competed in five events at the 1992 Summer Olympics.

== Eponymous skill ==
Servente has one eponymous skill listed in the Code of Points.

Apparatus	Name	Description	Difficulty (Note: Valid for the 2025-2028 Code of Points)
Vault	Servente	Round-off flic-flac with ½ turn (180°) on – tucked salto forward with ½ turn (180°) off	4.0
