= 1992 World Artistic Gymnastics Championships =

Gymnastics competition

- Venue: Bercy Arena
- Location: Paris, France
- Start date: 14 April 1992
- End date: 19 April 1992

The 27th World Artistic Gymnastics Championships were held in Paris, France, from 14 to 19 April 1992.

The team and all-around events were not contested at the 1992 Worlds. The format was similar to that of the 2002 Worlds, with medals being awarded for the individual WAG and MAG apparatus. There were three rounds of competition: the preliminary round open to everyone; the semi-finals open to the top sixteen qualifiers; and the finals for the top eight gymnasts as well as the defending champion from 1991, who received an automatic berth in the final.

== Medalists ==
Event	Gold	Silver	Bronze
Men
Floor	(Commonwealth of Independent States) Igor Korobchinsky	(Commonwealth of Independent States) Vitaly Scherbo	(Germany) Maik Krahberg
Pommel horse	(China) Li Jing (Commonwealth of Independent States) Vitaly Scherbo (North Korea) Pae Gil-Su	none awarded	none awarded
Rings	(Commonwealth of Independent States) Vitaly Scherbo	(Hungary) Szilveszter Csollány	(Commonwealth of Independent States) Grigory Misutin
Vault	(South Korea) You Ok-Youl	(Commonwealth of Independent States) Igor Korobchinsky	(Puerto Rico) Victor Colon (Canada) Curtis Hibbert
Parallel Bars	(Commonwealth of Independent States) Alexei Voropaev (China) Li Jing	none awarded	(Commonwealth of Independent States) Valery Belenky
Horizontal bar	(Commonwealth of Independent States) Grigory Misutin	(China) Li Jing	(Commonwealth of Independent States) Igor Korobchinsky
Women
Vault	(Hungary) Henrietta Ónodi	(Commonwealth of Independent States) Svetlana Boginskaya	(Commonwealth of Independent States) Oksana Chusovitina
Uneven bars	(Romania) Lavinia Miloșovici	(United States) Betty Okino	(Romania) Mirela Pașca
Balance beam	(United States) Kim Zmeskal	(China) Li Yifang (Romania) Maria Neculiță	none awarded
Floor	(United States) Kim Zmeskal	(Hungary) Henrietta Ónodi	(Romania) Maria Neculiță (Commonwealth of Independent States) Tatiana Lysenko

== Men ==
=== Floor exercise ===
Rank	Gymnast	Total
1st place, gold medalist(s)	Igor Korobchinsky (CIS)	9.812
2nd place, silver medalist(s)	Vitaly Scherbo (CIS)	9.687
3rd place, bronze medalist(s)	Maik Krahberg (GER)	9.625
4	Marius Gherman (ROU)	9.600
4	Yutaka Aihara (JPN)	9.600
6	Li Xiaoshuang (CHN)	9.425
7	Li Chunyang (CHN)	9.362
8	Yoo Ok-Ryul (KOR)	9.200
9	Yukio Iketani (JPN)	8.950

=== Pommel horse ===
Rank	Gymnast	Total
1st place, gold medalist(s)	Li Jing (CHN)	9.850
1st place, gold medalist(s)	Vitaly Scherbo (CIS)	9.850
1st place, gold medalist(s)	Pae Gil-Su (PRK)	9.850
4	Guo Linyao (CHN)	9.837
5	Hikaru Tanaka (JPN)	9.787
6	Yoshiaki Hatakeda (JPN)	9.762
7	Mark Sohn (USA)	9.725
8	Maik Belle (GER)	9.700
9	Valery Belenky (CIS)	9.375

=== Rings ===
Rank	Gymnast	Total
1st place, gold medalist(s)	Vitaly Scherbo (CIS)	9.900
2nd place, silver medalist(s)	Szilveszter Csollány (HUN)	9.850
3rd place, bronze medalist(s)	Grigory Misutin (CIS)	9.837
4	Paul O'Neill (USA)	9.762
5	Li Jing (CHN)	9.737
6	Sin Myong-Su (PRK)	9.725
7	Zoltán Supola (HUN)	9.675
8	Li Xiaoshuang (CHN)	9.650
9	Alfonso Rodriguez (ESP)	9.625

=== Vault ===
Rank	Gymnast	Total
1st place, gold medalist(s)	Yoo Ok-ryul (KOR)	9.675
2nd place, silver medalist(s)	Igor Korobchinsky (CIS)	9.587
3rd place, bronze medalist(s)	Victor Colon (PUR)	9.581
3rd place, bronze medalist(s)	Curtis Hibbert (CAN)	9.581
5	Marius Gherman (ROU)	9.543
6	Li Xiaoshuang (CHN)	9.531
7	Yeo Hong-Chul (KOR)	9.481
8	Ivan Nedialkov (BUL)	9.462

=== Parallel bars ===
Rank	Gymnast	Total
1st place, gold medalist(s)	Li Jing (CHN)	9.887
1st place, gold medalist(s)	Alexei Voropaev (CIS)	9.887
3rd place, bronze medalist(s)	Valery Belenky (CIS)	9.800
4	Zoltán Supola (HUN)	9.787
5	Guo Linyao (CHN)	9.775
6	Yoshiaki Hatakeda (JPN)	9.737
7	Curtis Hibbert (CAN)	9.687
8	Kalofer Hristozov (BUL)	9.662
9	Sergei Rumbutis (LIT)	9.537

=== Horizontal bar ===
Rank	Gymnast	Total
1st place, gold medalist(s)	Grigory Misutin (CIS)	9.862
2nd place, silver medalist(s)	Li Jing (CHN)	9.825
3rd place, bronze medalist(s)	Igor Korobchinsky (CIS)	9.787
4	Johan Jonasson (SWE)	9.737
5	Yukio Iketani (JPN)	9.700
6	Curtis Hibbert (CAN)	9.650
7	Rob Doyle (CAN)	9.475
8	Li Chunyang (CHN)	9.400
9	Daisuke Nishikawa (JPN)	9.125

== Women ==
=== Vault ===
Rank	Gymnast	Vault 1	Vault 2	Total
1st place, gold medalist(s)	Henrietta Ónodi (HUN)	9.950	9.950	9.950
2nd place, silver medalist(s)	Svetlana Boginskaya (CIS)	9.962	9.925	9.943
3rd place, bronze medalist(s)	Oksana Chusovitina (CIS)	9.925	9.950	9.937
4	Lavinia Miloșovici (ROU)	9.912	9.900	9.906
5	Silvia Mitova (BUL)	9.875	9.850	9.862
6	Kerri Strug (USA)	9.862	9.775	9.818
7	Gina Gogean (ROU)	9.875	9.350	9.600
8	Stella Umeh (CAN)	9.900	9.212	9.556
9	Elvira Becks (NED)	9.862	9.100	9.481

=== Uneven bars ===
Rank	Gymnast	S.V.	Total
1st place, gold medalist(s)	Lavinia Miloșovici (ROU)	10.0	9.950
2nd place, silver medalist(s)	Betty Okino (USA)	10.0	9.900
3rd place, bronze medalist(s)	Mirela Pașca (ROU)	10.0	9.887
4	Lu Li (CHN)	10.0	9.875
5	Li Yifang (CHN)	10.0	9.862
5	Krisztina Molnár (HUN)	10.0	9.862
7	Kerri Strug (USA)	10.0	9.850
8	Julie-Anne Monico (AUS)	10.0	9.800
9	Tatiana Lysenko (CIS)	9.9	9.775

=== Balance beam ===
Rank	Gymnast	S.V.	Total
1st place, gold medalist(s)	Kim Zmeskal (USA)	10.0	9.925
2nd place, silver medalist(s)	Li Yifang (CHN)	10.0	9.850
2nd place, silver medalist(s)	Maria Neculiță (ROU)	10.0	9.850
4	Silvia Mitova (BUL)	10.0	9.800
5	Stella Umeh (CAN)	10.0	9.775
6	Svetlana Boginskaya (CIS)	9.9	9.750
7	Tatiana Lysenko (CIS)	10.0	9.362
8	Betty Okino (USA)	10.0	9.337
9	Gina Gogean (ROU)	9.9	8.750

=== Floor exercise ===
Rank	Gymnast	S.V	pen.	Total
1st place, gold medalist(s)	Kim Zmeskal (USA)	10.0		9.937
2nd place, silver medalist(s)	Henrietta Ónodi (HUN)	10.0		9.912
3rd place, bronze medalist(s)	Maria Neculiță (ROU)	10.0		9.887
3rd place, bronze medalist(s)	Tatiana Lysenko (CIS)	10.0		9.887
5	Sonia Fraguas (ESP)	10.0		9.812
6	Li Yifang (CHN)	10.0		9.812
7	Oksana Chusovitina (CIS)	10.0	0.1	9.800
8	Lavinia Miloșovici (ROU)	10.0		9.300
9	Silvia Mitova (BUL)	1.0		1.000

== Medals ==
=== Overall ===
Rank	Nation	Gold	Silver	Bronze	Total
1	CIS (CIS)	5	3	5	13
2	China (CHN)	2	2	0	4
3	United States (USA)	2	1	0	3
4	Hungary (HUN)	1	2	0	3
5	Romania (ROU)	1	1	2	4
6	North Korea (PRK)	1	0	0	1
6	South Korea (KOR)	1	0	0	1
8	Canada (CAN)	0	0	1	1
8	Germany (GER)	0	0	1	1
8	Puerto Rico (PUR)	0	0	1	1
Totals (10 entries)		13	9	10	32

=== Men ===
Rank	Nation	Gold	Silver	Bronze	Total
1	CIS	5	2	3	10
2	China	2	1	0	3
3	North Korea	1	0	0	1
3	South Korea	1	0	0	1
5	Hungary	0	1	0	1
6	Canada	0	0	1	1
6	Germany	0	0	1	1
6	Puerto Rico	0	0	1	1
Totals (8 entries)		9	4	6	19

=== Women ===
Rank	Nation	Gold	Silver	Bronze	Total
1	United States	2	1	0	3
2	Romania	1	1	2	4
3	Hungary	1	1	0	2
4	CIS	0	1	2	3
5	China	0	1	0	1
Totals (5 entries)		4	5	4	13
