= Ruth Rollán =

Spanish gymnast

Personal information
- Nationality: Spanish
- Born: 14 May 1977 (age 47); Madrid, Spain

Sport
- Sport: Gymnastics

Ruth Rollán González (born 14 May 1977) is a Spanish gymnast. She competed in six events at the 1992 Summer Olympics.
