= Elena Romero =

Elena Romero Barbosa (born 7 November 1907, d. 1996) was a Spanish composer born in Madrid. She also wrote professional articles on music. Selected works include:

- Marcela (1957) chamber opera
- Song of Turina

Her work has been recorded and issued on CD, including:

- "Elena Romero: Integrale pour piano, by Alberto Portugheis" 10/8/2013
- Twentieth-century Spanish Composers (20/10/2006)
