= Bénédicte Evrard =

Belgian gymnast (born 1975)

Personal information
- Nationality: Belgian
- Born: 21 March 1975 (age 49); Brussels, Belgium

Sport
- Sport: Gymnastics

Bénédicte Evrard (born 21 March 1975) is a Belgian gymnast. She competed in five events at the 1992 Summer Olympics.
