= Annette Potempa =

German gymnast

Personal information
- Nationality: German
- Born: 18 September 1976 (age 48); Chorzów, Poland

Sport
- Sport: Gymnastics

Annette Potempa (born 18 September 1976) is a German gymnast. She competed in six events at the 1992 Summer Olympics.
