= Kathleen Stark =

German gymnast

Personal information
- Nationality: German
- Born: 9 September 1975 (age 49); Rostock, East Germany

Sport
- Sport: Gymnastics

Kathleen Stark (born 9 September 1975) is a German former gymnast. She competed at the 1992 Summer Olympics and the 1996 Summer Olympics.

== Competitive history ==
Year	Event	Team	AA	VT	UB	BB	FX
Junior
1985	GDR Children's Spartakiade		2nd place, silver medalist(s)				
1989	International Junior Championships		20				
Senior
1990	ESP-SUI-GDR Tri-Meet		9				
1990	Goodwill Games		12	6			
1990	Olympic Cup		8				
1991	DTB Cup		9				
1991	German Championships		20				
1991	GER-ROM Dual Meet	2nd place, silver medalist(s)	11				
1991	Swiss Cup	8					
1991	World Championships	10	26				
1992	German Championships		6				
1992	German Olympic Trials		6				
1992	ROM-GER Dual Meet	2nd place, silver medalist(s)	8				
1992	Olympic Games	9	32				
1995	German Championships		2nd place, silver medalist(s)	2nd place, silver medalist(s)	3rd place, bronze medalist(s)	3rd place, bronze medalist(s)	2nd place, silver medalist(s)
1995	ROM-GER Dual Meet	2nd place, silver medalist(s)	6				
1996	DTB Cup			6	1st place, gold medalist(s)	6	
1996	World Championships				6		
1996	European Championships		14				
1996	German Championships		1st place, gold medalist(s)				
1997	Cottbus International			1st place, gold medalist(s)	6	7	4
1997	ROM-GER Dual Meet	2nd place, silver medalist(s)	10				
1997	Glasgow Grand Prix			7	8		
1997	World Stars			6	4	5	
