= Monique Allen =

Australian gymnast (born 1971)

Personal information
- Nationality: Australian
- Born: 10 November 1971 (age 54)

Sport
- Sport: Gymnastics
Medal record
Gymnastics
Representing Australia
Commonwealth Games
Gold medal – first place	1990 Auckland	Women's Uneven Bars
Silver medal – second place	1990 Auckland	Women's All Around
Silver medal – second place	1990 Auckland	Women's Team
Bronze medal – third place	1990 Auckland	Women's Vault

Monique Marie Allen (born 10 November 1971) is an Australian retired Olympic gymnast.

Allen joined the Australian Institute of Sport before participating in the 1990 Commonwealth Games in Auckland, where she earned 9.875 points on the uneven bars, making her the first Australian female gymnast to receive a gold medal.

== Competitive history ==
Year	Event	Team	AA	VT	UB	BB	FX
Junior
1984	Junior AUS-NZL Dual Meet	1st place, gold medalist(s)	1st place, gold medalist(s)		1st place, gold medalist(s)	3rd place, bronze medalist(s)	3rd place, bronze medalist(s)
Senior
1987	AUS-Karolyi's Gymnastics		4				
1988	Australian Championships		1st place, gold medalist(s)				
1988	Konica Grand Prix		3rd place, bronze medalist(s)				2nd place, silver medalist(s)
1988	Kosice Cup		6				
1988	Pacific Alliance Championships		6				
1989	Australian Championships		1st place, gold medalist(s)				
1989	China Cup		6	5	8	8	6
1989	Konica Grand Prix		5	3rd place, bronze medalist(s)	3rd place, bronze medalist(s)	5	
1989	World Championships	16	25				
1990	Australian Championships		1st place, gold medalist(s)				
1990	Commonwealth Games		2nd place, silver medalist(s)	3rd place, bronze medalist(s)	1st place, gold medalist(s)	4	
1990	French International		12				
1990	International Mixed Pairs	12					
1991	Seiko Grand Prix		4		1st place, gold medalist(s)	1st place, gold medalist(s)	
1991	World Championships	6	21				
1992
1992	Olympic Games	7	19				
