= Marie-Angéline Colson =

French gymnast

Personal information
- Nationality: French
- Born: 21 May 1976 (age 48); Clermont-Ferrand, France

Sport
- Sport: Gymnastics

Marie-Angéline Colson (born 21 May 1976) is a French gymnast. She competed in six events at the 1992 Summer Olympics.
