= Silvia Martínez (gymnast) =

Spanish gymnast

Personal information
- Nationality: Spanish
- Born: 22 September 1974 (age 50); Madrid, Spain

Sport
- Sport: Gymnastics

Silvia Martínez (born 22 September 1974) is a Spanish gymnast. She competed in six events at the 1992 Summer Olympics.
