= Kylie Shadbolt =

Australian artistic gymnast

Kylie Noele Shadbolt
- Born: 8 November 1972 (age 53)

Gymnastics career
Medal record
Gymnastics
Commonwealth Games
Silver medal – second place	1990 Auckland	Team
Bronze medal – third place	1990 Auckland	Individual
Bronze medal – third place	1990 Auckland	beam
Bronze medal – third place	1990 Auckland	floor

Kylie Shadbolt (born 8 November 1972) is an Australian artistic gymnast.

Shadbolt competed at the 1992 Summer Olympics in Barcelona in the individual and team all-around events. She also competed at the 1990 Commonwealth Games where she won a silver medal in the team event and bronze medals in the individual, beam and floor events.
