= Bernadett Balázs =

Hungarian gymnast

Personal information
- Nationality: Hungarian
- Born: 19 April 1975 (age 49); Budapest, Hungary

Sport
- Sport: Gymnastics

Bernadett Balázs (born 19 April 1975) is a Hungarian gymnast. She competed in six events at the 1992 Summer Olympics.
