= Kristina Panayotova =

Bulgarian gymnast (born 1975)

Personal information
- Nationality: Bulgarian
- Born: 27 August 1975 (age 49); Sofia, Bulgaria

Sport
- Sport: Gymnastics

Kristina Panayotova (born 27 August 1975) is a Bulgarian gymnast. She competed in six events at the 1992 Summer Olympics.
