= Svetlana Boginskaya =

Belarusian gymnast

- Святлана Багінская
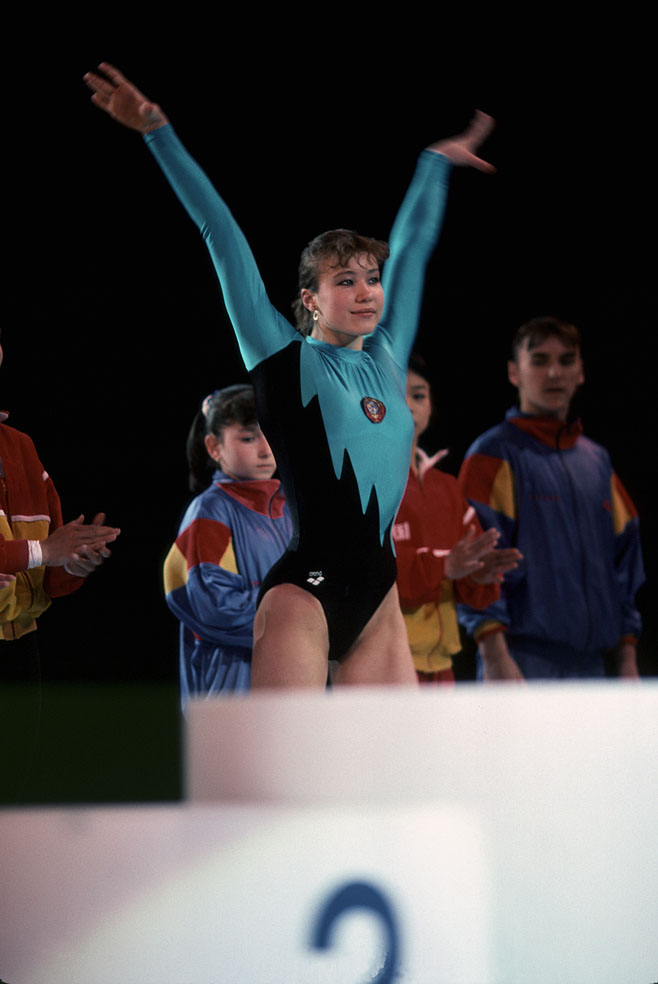
- Boginskaya in 1990

Personal information
- Full name: Svetlana Leonidovna Boginskaya
- Nicknames: Belarusian Swan, Goddess of Gymnastics
- Born: February 9, 1973 (age 53) Minsk, Belarusian SSR, USSR (now Belarus)
- Height: 158.5 cm (5 ft 2 in)

Gymnastics career
- Discipline: Women's artistic gymnastics
- Country represented: Belarus
- Former countries represented: CIS ( Unified Team), Soviet Union
- Head coach: Tatiana Grosovivich
- Former coach: Lyubov Miromanova
- Retired: 1997
Medal record
Event	1st	2nd	3rd
Olympic Games	3	1	1
World Championships	5	3	1
European Championships	9	1	0
World Cup Final	1	1	1
Goodwill Games	2	1	1
American Cup	0	1	0
Total	21	8	4
Representing Soviet Union
Olympic Games
Gold medal – first place	1988 Seoul	Team
Gold medal – first place	1988 Seoul	Vault
Silver medal – second place	1988 Seoul	Floor exercise
Bronze medal – third place	1988 Seoul	All-around
World Championships
Gold medal – first place	1989 Stuttgart	Team
Gold medal – first place	1989 Stuttgart	All-around
Gold medal – first place	1989 Stuttgart	Floor exercise
Gold medal – first place	1991 Indianapolis	Team
Gold medal – first place	1991 Indianapolis	Balance beam
Silver medal – second place	1987 Rotterdam	Team
Silver medal – second place	1991 Indianapolis	All-around
Bronze medal – third place	1987 Rotterdam	Balance beam
European Championships
Gold medal – first place	1989 Brussels	All-around
Gold medal – first place	1989 Brussels	Vault
Gold medal – first place	1989 Brussels	Floor exercise
Gold medal – first place	1990 Athens	All-around
Gold medal – first place	1990 Athens	Vault
Gold medal – first place	1990 Athens	Uneven bars
Gold medal – first place	1990 Athens	Balance beam
Gold medal – first place	1990 Athens	Floor exercise
World Cup Final
Gold medal – first place	1990 Brussels	Floor exercise
Silver medal – second place	1990 Brussels	All-around
Bronze medal – third place	1990 Brussels	Vault
Goodwill Games
Gold medal – first place	1990 Seattle	Team
Gold medal – first place	1990 Seattle	Floor exercise
Silver medal – second place	1990 Seattle	All-around
Bronze medal – third place	1990 Seattle	Balance beam
Representing CIS ( Unified Team)
Olympic Games
Gold medal – first place	1992 Barcelona	Team
World Championships
Silver medal – second place	1992 Paris	Vault
Representing Belarus
European Championships
Gold medal – first place	1992 Nantes	Balance beam
Silver medal – second place	1996 Birmingham	All-around
American Cup
Silver medal – second place	1996 Fort Worth	All-around

Svetlana Leonidovna Boginskaya (Note: Belarusian: Святлана Леанідаўна Багінская, romanized: Svyatlana Lyeanidawna Bahinskaya) (born February 9, 1973) is a former artistic gymnast for the Soviet Union and Belarus of Belarusian origin. She is a three-time Olympic champion, with an individual gold medal on vault from the 1988 Summer Olympics and team gold medals from the 1988 and 1992 Summer Olympics.

== Early life ==
Boginskaya was born in Minsk, Belarus on February 9, 1973. Her mother worked as a caster, and her father was a joiner; she also has an older brother, and the family kept a pet tortoise. She practiced figure skating before beginning gymnastics at age six, after seeing Nadia Comăneci compete at the Olympics. Two years later, she moved to Moscow to train full-time at the Round Lake Gymnastics Center, where she trained with Lyubov Miromanova. As a teenager, she was fond of small dolls, with which she acted out gymnastics skills.

== Gymnastics career ==
Boginskaya won two international meets in Hungary and Japan in 1984, and she won the 1986 European Junior Championships. She competed internationally as a senior for the first time at the 1987 World Championships, where she placed third on balance beam; the team placed second. She went on to compete in the 1988 Olympic Games in Seoul, South Korea, where she won four medals: gold in the team competition, gold on vault, silver on floor, and bronze in the individual all-around. Boginskaya's floor exercise routine that season was set to a special arrangement of Carmen.

Three days after the Olympics, Boginskaya's longtime coach, Lyubov Miromanova, died by suicide. Miromanova had been a surrogate mother to Boginskaya, coaching and caring for her after she moved from Minsk to train full-time in Moscow.

After Miromanova's death, Boginskaya initially ceased training, then began again first on her own and then under Ludmila Popkovich, whose coaching style involved much more freedom of choice in how to train, which led to conflicts between the two at first. Boginskaya competed at the 1989 European Women's Artistic Gymnastics Championships, where she received gold in all-around, vault, and floor. Later that year, she placed first in the all-around, floor, and team events at the 1989 World Artistic Gymnastics Championships. Shortly before the Championships, she and Popkovich had a disagreement, and she described herself as competing "practically without a coach" and feeling lonely while accepting her medals. Her floor routine was set to music by Italian pop singer Raffaella Carrà.

The following year, Boginskaya became the third woman to win the gold medal in every individual event at the European Championships. She earned the only perfect 10 of the all-around competition on her vault.She also competed at the FIG World Cup, where she placed first on floor.

In 1991, Boginskaya won gold at the World Championships on beam and silver in the all-around; the team won gold.

In 1992, Boginskaya competed at the European Championships, where she won gold on beam with a score of 9.95. However, she fell during her final event, the floor exercise, ultimately finishing fifth in the all-around. Her teammate, Tatiana Gutsu, received the all-around title. Despite Boginskaya's fall on floor, she remained a favorite to win the all-around title at the 1992 Summer Olympics in Barcelona, Spain. At the World Championships, Boginskaya won silver on vault and was selected for the Unified Team at the 1992 Summer Olympics. Many in the gymnastics world expected a duel between Boginskaya and Zmeskal at the Olympics, and the media promoted this story. At the Olympic games, Boginskaya won her third Olympic gold in the team competition; in the individual competition, she faltered on the uneven bars and finished fifth in the individual all-around; Zmeskal finished tenth.

Following the 1992 Olympics, Boginskaya retired. However, she returned to the sport in 1995, stating that she had been inspired by Katarina Witt who had a memorable comeback at the 1994 Winter Olympics. Boginskaya moved to Houston, Texas to train with Bela Karolyi (1942–2024) and upgraded the difficulty of her routines. At the 1995 European Championships, she won silver in the all-around.

In 1996, at age 23, she placed second in the all-around at the American Cup behind one of Karolyi's pupils, Kerri Strug. She also placed second at the European Championships in Birmingham behind the defending world champion Lilia Podkopayeva. She then progressed to the 1996 Olympics in Atlanta, Georgia, where she was one of a number of older gymnasts competing. Boginskaya competed in the all-around and vault finals, but did not medal. The Belarusian team came in sixth.

Following the 1996 Olympics, Boginskaya retired from gymnastics.

Boginskaya is among a small group of women to have competed in three Olympic Games; and due to the break-up of the Soviet Union, she competed at each Games under a different flag: USSR, the Unified Team, and Belarus. She was inducted into the International Gymnastics Hall of Fame in 2005.

Boginskaya has remained active in both the American and international gymnastics communities, and works as a consulting guest coach. In the early 2010s, she frequently supported former teammate Oksana Chusovitina, who continues to compete in her late 40s, and has appeared on the competition floor as her coach.

== Post-gymnastics and personal life ==
Boginskaya lives in Houston, Texas with her husband and two children. She runs several businesses, including an online gymnastics apparel retailer and a summer camp for gymnasts.

== In popular culture ==
After the 1992 Olympics, Boginskaya appeared alongside her compatriot Vitaly Scherbo in the music video for the song "Revolution Earth," by The B-52's.

== Trademarks ==
Boginskaya's floor routine at the 1988 Olympics was done to the music of Georges Bizet's Carmen, and another routine she performed in parts of 1990 and 1991 was choreographed by the Bolshoi Ballet. Her uneven bars exercise included a signature giant to handstand with 180° split into a toe-on element. Commentators and reporters cited her height and slim stature as elements she used to her advantage through attention to posture and body alignment; meanwhile they also suggested that she relied more on execution and presentation than difficulty, though she did usually fulfill requirements and earn 10.0 start values. She frequently landed dismounts and vaults with her right foot placed slightly in front of her left, an intentional touch of artistry that also helped her stick landings.

== Competitive history ==
Competitive history of Svetlana Boginskaya
Year	Event	Team	AA	VT	UB	BB	FX
1987
1987	World Championships	2nd place, silver medalist(s)				3rd place, bronze medalist(s)	
1988
1988	Olympic Games	1st place, gold medalist(s)	3rd place, bronze medalist(s)	1st place, gold medalist(s)			2nd place, silver medalist(s)
1989
1989	European Championships		1st place, gold medalist(s)	1st place, gold medalist(s)	4	4	1st place, gold medalist(s)
1989	World Championships	1st place, gold medalist(s)	1st place, gold medalist(s)		8		1st place, gold medalist(s)
1990
1990	European Championships		1st place, gold medalist(s)	1st place, gold medalist(s)	1st place, gold medalist(s)	1st place, gold medalist(s)	1st place, gold medalist(s)
1990	Goodwill Games	1st place, gold medalist(s)	2nd place, silver medalist(s)			3rd place, bronze medalist(s)	1st place, gold medalist(s)
1990	World Cup Final		2nd place, silver medalist(s)	3rd place, bronze medalist(s)	4	4	1st place, gold medalist(s)
1991
1991	World Championships	1st place, gold medalist(s)	2nd place, silver medalist(s)	5		1st place, gold medalist(s)	7
1992
1992	European Championships		5	8	4	1st place, gold medalist(s)	
1992	World Championships			2nd place, silver medalist(s)		6	
1992	Olympic Games	1st place, gold medalist(s)	5	4		5	
1995
1995	World Championships	8	16				
1996	American Cup		2nd place, silver medalist(s)	1st place, gold medalist(s)	1st place, gold medalist(s)	1st place, gold medalist(s)	
1996	European Championships	4	2nd place, silver medalist(s)	6	6	4	6
1996	Olympic Games	6	15	5			

Detailed competitive history
Year	Competition Description	Location	Competed For	Apparatus	Final		Qualifying	
Year	Competition Description	Location	Competed For	Apparatus	Rank	Score	Rank	Score
1991	World Championships	Indianapolis	Soviet Union	Team	1st	396.055		
1991	World Championships	Indianapolis	Soviet Union	All-Around	2nd	39.736	1st	79.548
1991	World Championships	Indianapolis	Soviet Union	Vault	5th	9.850	1st	19.837
1991	World Championships	Indianapolis	Soviet Union	Uneven Bars	WD		1st	19.912
1991	World Championships	Indianapolis	Soviet Union	Balance Beam	1st	9.962	2nd	19.887
1991	World Championships	Indianapolis	Soviet Union	Floor Exercise	7th	9.862	1st	19.912
1990	World Cup Final	Brussels	Soviet Union	All-Around	2nd	39.586		
1990	World Cup Final	Brussels	Soviet Union	Vault	3rd	9.912	1st	9.937
1990	World Cup Final	Brussels	Soviet Union	Uneven Bars	4th	9.887	6th	9.825
1990	World Cup Final	Brussels	Soviet Union	Balance Beam	4th	9.887	2nd	9.887
1990	World Cup Final	Brussels	Soviet Union	Floor Exercise	1st	9.962	1st	9.937
1990	European Championships	Athens	Soviet Union	All-Around	1st	39.874		
1990	European Championships	Athens	Soviet Union	Vault	1st	9.943	1st	10.000
1990	European Championships	Athens	Soviet Union	Uneven Bars	1st	9.950	1st	9.975
1990	European Championships	Athens	Soviet Union	Balance Beam	1st	10.000	2nd	9.962
1990	European Championships	Athens	Soviet Union	Floor Exercise	1st	10.000	1st	9.937
1989	World Championships	Stuttgart	Soviet Union	Team	1st	396.793		
1989	World Championships	Stuttgart	Soviet Union	All-Around	1st	39.900		79.262
1989	World Championships	Stuttgart	Soviet Union	Vault				19.925
1989	World Championships	Stuttgart	Soviet Union	Uneven Bars	8th	9.450		19.925
1989	World Championships	Stuttgart	Soviet Union	Balance Beam				19.425
1989	World Championships	Stuttgart	Soviet Union	Floor Exercise	1st	10.000	1st	19.987
1992	Olympic Games	Barcelona	CIS	Team	1st	395.666		
1992	Olympic Games	Barcelona	CIS	All-Around	5th	39.673	2nd	79.287
1992	Olympic Games	Barcelona	CIS	Vault	4th	9.899	8th	19.800
1992	Olympic Games	Barcelona	CIS	Uneven Bars			10th	19.787
1992	Olympic Games	Barcelona	CIS	Balance Beam	5th	9.862	2nd	19.800
1992	Olympic Games	Barcelona	CIS	Floor Exercise	WD		1st	19.900
1992	World Championships	Paris	CIS	Vault	2nd	9.943		
1992	World Championships	Paris	CIS	Vault (Semi−Final)			1st	9.912
1992	World Championships	Paris	CIS	Vault (Qualification)			1st	9.900
1992	World Championships	Paris	CIS	Balance Beam	6th	9.750		
1992	European Championships	Nantes	CIS	All-Around	5th	39.136		
1992	European Championships	Nantes	CIS	Vault	8th	9.675	2nd	9.937
1992	European Championships	Nantes	CIS	Uneven Bars	4th	9.850	2nd	9.937
1992	European Championships	Nantes	CIS	Balance Beam	1st	9.950	1st	9.937
1992	European Championships	Nantes	CIS	Floor Exercise			44th	9.325
1995	World Championships	Sabae	Belarus	Team	8th	375.512		
1995	World Championships	Sabae	Belarus	All-Around	16th	38.261	14th	76.461
1995	World Championships	Sabae	Belarus	Vault			23rd	18.925
1995	World Championships	Sabae	Belarus	Uneven Bars			29th	19.124
1995	World Championships	Sabae	Belarus	Balance Beam			20th	18.975
1995	World Championships	Sabae	Belarus	Floor Exercise			15th	19.437
1996	Olympic Games	Atlanta	Belarus	Team	6th	381.263		
1996	Olympic Games	Atlanta	Belarus	All-Around	13th	38.499	25th	76.223
1996	Olympic Games	Atlanta	Belarus	Vault	5th	9.712	9th	19.474
1996	Olympic Games	Atlanta	Belarus	Uneven Bars			64th	18.587
1996	Olympic Games	Atlanta	Belarus	Balance Beam			27th	18.850
1996	Olympic Games	Atlanta	Belarus	Floor Exercise			24th	19.312
1996	European Championships	Birmingham	Belarus	Team	4th	114.546		
1996	European Championships	Birmingham	Belarus	All-Around	2nd	39.106	4th	38.898
1996	European Championships	Birmingham	Belarus	Vault	6th	9.662	5th	9.737
1996	European Championships	Birmingham	Belarus	Uneven Bars	6th	9.725	7th	9.737
1996	European Championships	Birmingham	Belarus	Balance Beam	4th	9.575	5th	9.662
1996	European Championships	Birmingham	Belarus	Floor Exercise	6th	9.600	3rd	9.762

== See also ==
- List of top Olympic gymnastics medalists
- List of top medalists at the World Artistic Gymnastics Championships
