= Julie-Anne Monico =

Australian artistic gymnast

Personal information
- Nationality: Australian
- Born: 16 March 1976 (age 49)

Sport
- Sport: Gymnastics

Julie-Anne Monico (born 16 March 1976) is an Australian gymnast. She competed in six events at the 1992 Summer Olympics.
