= Betty Okino =

American gymnast (born 1975)

- Full name: Elizabeth Anna Okino
- Nickname: Betty
- Born: June 4, 1975 (age 51) Entebbe, Uganda

Gymnastics career
- Discipline: Women's artistic gymnastics
- Country represented: United States; (1990–1992)
- Club: Karolyi Gymnastics
- Head coach: Béla Károlyi
- Eponymous skills: Okino (balance beam and uneven bars)
- Retired: 1992
Medal record
Representing the United States
Olympic Games
Bronze medal – third place	1992 Barcelona	Team
World Championships
Silver medal – second place	1991 Indianapolis	Team
Silver medal – second place	1992 Paris	Uneven bars
Bronze medal – third place	1991 Indianapolis	Balance beam

Elizabeth Anna Okino (born June 4, 1975) is a retired American gymnast, a member of the famous "Károlyi Six-Pack" who in 1992 helped the United States win its first Olympic team medal in a non-boycotted Olympic Games. She is also the first Black woman of any nationality to win multiple individual World Championship medals in gymnastics.

== Career ==
Born in Entebbe, Uganda, Okino moved to the United States with her family and began gymnastics at the age of 9. Four years later, in 1988, she had progressed to the elite level, placing 17th at that year's junior U.S. National Championships. In 1990, Okino moved to Houston to train with Marta and Béla Károlyi. She placed second in the all-around and won the balance beam title at the 1990 U.S. Nationals; and represented the United States at several major international meets, including the Goodwill Games, where she won a silver medal with the American team and finished fourth in the all-around and uneven bars finals. Okino was part of the U.S. team for the 1991 World Gymnastics Championships, winning a silver medal in team finals and a bronze on the balance beam. She also won the 1991 American Cup.

Okino continued to succeed in 1992, winning a silver medal on the bars at the 1992 World Championships. However, serious injuries to her spine forced her to miss both the 1992 U.S. Nationals and Olympic Trials. In spite of this, she was added to the U.S. team for the 1992 Olympics based on her performance at a second, private trial for U.S. Gymnastics Federation officials and coaches. With Okino on the team, the US won their first Olympic team medal, a bronze, in a fully attended Games; she also qualified for the balance beam event final, and placed 12th in the all-around.

== Personal life and recent activities ==
Her mother, Aurelia Matei, is a native of Romania and her father, Francis Okino, is Ugandan. Her father met her Romanian mother while studying veterinary medicine in Bucharest. Betty is fluent in Romanian. This skill came in handy in the gym and international competitions, where she could tell her teammates what was being said about them by their coaches and the Romanian gymnasts. When the Karolyis discovered Okino understood Romanian, they switched to speaking Hungarian in the gym.

Following her retirement from gymnastics, Okino became involved in show business. She has performed with SeaWorld and has appeared in many television shows and films, including Moesha, The District, Sabrina the Teenage Witch, Æon Flux and Everybody Hates Chris.

Currently Betty lives with her husband, Jacob, in southern California where she teaches dance, choreography and artistry as part of the USAG National Staff, is a sought after motivational speaker, and also owns and operates Betty O Choreo which provides gymnastics camps, clinics and choreography around the world.

== Eponymous skills ==
Okino has two eponymous skills listed in the Code of Points.

Apparatus	Name	Description	Difficulty (Note: Valid for the 2025–2028 Code of Points)
Uneven bars	Okino	Clear hip with half turn to backwards salto laid out	D (0.4)
Balance beam	Okino	Triple turn with leg below horizontal	E (0.5)

== See also ==
- Ugandan Americans
