= Tatiana Gutsu =

Soviet gymnast (born 1976)

Tatiana Gutsu Тетяна Ґуцу
- Full name: Tatiana Gutsu
- Born: 5 September 1976 (age 50) Odesa, Ukrainian SSR, Soviet Union

Gymnastics career
- Discipline: Women's artistic gymnastics
- Country represented: CIS ( Unified Team) Soviet Union (1988–1992) Ukraine; (1992)
- Club: Ukrainian Armed Forces (Odesa)
Medal record
Event	1st	2nd	3rd
Olympic Games	2	1	1
World Championships	1	2	0
European Championships	3	1	1
European Cup Final	5	0	0
Representing CIS ( Unified Team)
Olympic Games
Gold medal – first place	1992 Barcelona	Team
Gold medal – first place	1992 Barcelona	All-Around
Silver medal – second place	1992 Barcelona	Uneven Bars
Bronze medal – third place	1992 Barcelona	Floor Exercise
Representing Soviet Union
World Championships
Gold medal – first place	1991 Indianapolis	Team
Silver medal – second place	1991 Indianapolis	Uneven Bars
Silver medal – second place	1991 Indianapolis	Balance Beam
European Cup Final
Gold medal – first place	1991 Brussels	All-Around
Gold medal – first place	1991 Brussels	Vault
Gold medal – first place	1991 Brussels	Uneven Bars
Gold medal – first place	1991 Brussels	Balance Beam
Gold medal – first place	1991 Brussels	Floor Exercise
Representing Ukraine
European Championships
Gold medal – first place	1992 Nantes	All-Around
Gold medal – first place	1992 Nantes	Vault
Gold medal – first place	1992 Nantes	Uneven Bars
Silver medal – second place	1992 Nantes	Balance Beam
Bronze medal – third place	1992 Nantes	Floor Exercise

Tatiana Gutsu, rarely Tetiana Hutsu, (Ukrainian: Тетяна Костянтинівна Ґуцу, Romanian: Tatiana Guțu; born 5 September 1976, in Odesa, Ukrainian SSR) is a Ukrainian former artistic gymnast from the Soviet Union and the winner of the all-around title in the 1992 Summer Olympics. She was renowned for performing some of the most difficult routines in the sport. She was inducted into the International Gymnastics Hall of Fame in 2022.

== Career ==
Born into a Ukrainian family with Moldovan roots, Gutsu started in gymnastics at age 6. She became a member of the national team of the Soviet Union in 1988. Her first major international competition was the 1991 World Artistic Gymnastics Championships in Indianapolis, where she won the team title with the Soviet Union and finished fifth in the individual all-around, while winning silver medals in two individual apparatus finals: the uneven bars and balance beam. Her silver on beam was highly controversial because the winner, Soviet teammate Svetlana Boginskaya, performed a simpler routine.

Gutsu was quickly noticed for the difficulty of her routines. She was one of the few gymnasts during the late 80s/early 90s to perform a double-twisting Yurchenko vault. She also debuted a double layout somersault on floor with split legs in the first salto, a skill that few others have been able to perform. Perhaps most impressively, she ended her floor routine in the team competition with a double layout somersault.

The following year, she had a disastrous showing at the 1992 World Championships. She had been expected to contend for gold on three events—uneven bars, balance beam, and floor exercise—but failed to reach the finals on any of them, suffering falls on both the bars and floor. However, at the European Gymnastics Championships that year, she won the all-around, vault, and uneven bars titles, as well as a silver on the balance beam. She was the most successful gymnast of the championship and established herself as one of the favorites for the Olympic all-around title.

=== 1992 Olympics ===
In the preliminary round of competition at the Olympics, Gutsu, then 15, fell from the balance beam and was ranked 9th in the all-around. She had been on course to win the optional portion of the team competition and was one of the favourites for the beam gold medal, but the fall meant she did not qualify for the beam final.

Although 36 gymnasts qualified for the all-around, only three competitors from each country were allowed in the final, and because of Gutsu's fall, three other competitors from the Unified Team placed higher in the preliminaries. However, the team coaches felt that Gutsu had a better chance of bringing home all-around gold than her teammates Boginskaya and Rozalia Galiyeva. They considered scratching Boginskaya, but felt that she was too famous and there would be a scandal. As a result, they forced Gutsu's younger teammate Galiyeva to forfeit her place in the final so that Gutsu could compete. Galiyeva was forced to claim a severe knee injury, which was "verified" by the team physician.

In one of the deepest fields ever for the all-around, Gutsu was in a close race for the gold medal. She had a few balance checks in her difficult beam routine and made an error on her double layout on floor, allowing her rivals to stay in contention with her. With one apparatus to go, Gutsu was tied for first place with Shannon Miller of the United States. Her final performance on vault (a full-twisting layout Yurchenko) was just enough to hold off Miller's challenge. Gutsu won the title by .012, which remains the closest margin of victory ever in an Olympic all-around. She also took home medals in the team competition (gold), uneven bars (silver) and floor exercise (bronze).

What set Gutsu apart from Miller was her difficulty. She was competing during the height of the "pixie" era, when the favoured type of gymnast was a small athlete capable of extreme difficulty, and Gutsu exemplified this. She performed the same vault as most other leading gymnasts (except Tatiana Lysenko), but her difficulty on the other three events was high. Her beam routine was especially notable: she competed probably the most difficult dismount sequence of all time, three back handsprings into a tucked full-in, and also performed a standing back somersault with a full twist. On floor, Gutsu opened with a split-leg double layout and closed with a piked full-in. On bars, she dismounted with a double layout. Miller showed less difficulty, particularly on the floor exercise (where she performed a whip to tucked full-in for her mount, a whip to double pike for her middle pass, and a tucked full-in for her dismount), but was impressive on beam with her back handspring to three layouts sequence, her superior form, and a stuck full-in dismount.

Galiyeva was always angry and bitter about having given up her place in the all-around to Gutsu, feeling that she had had no option but to agree. The two split the prize money between them, but they stopped speaking after the Olympics. The substitution was against the rules (as Galiyeva's injury was not genuine), but such switches were and are common in gymnastics, usually when a gymnast considered to be the best on the team makes a mistake in qualifications and thus finishes behind a teammate who is considered weaker. Other notable examples include the replacement of Alexandra Marinescu with Simona Amânar in the 1996 Olympics, and the Soviet coaches' removal of Olga Mostepanova and Irina Baraksanova for Elena Shushunova and Oksana Omelianchik in the 1985 World Championships. On both occasions, the gymnasts substituted in took a medal. Coaches now have the right to make such substitutions without having to falsify injuries.

After retiring from competitive gymnastics, Gutsu moved to the United States, where she is a gymnastics coach in Michigan. She tried for a comeback to compete at the 2003 World Artistic Gymnastics Championships as a three-event specialist (vault, beam, and floor), but was unsuccessful.

== Alleged rape ==
In October 2017, she accused former Soviet (Belarusian) gymnast Vitaly Scherbo of raping her when she was 15.

== Competitive history ==
Year	Event	Team	AA	VT	UB	BB	FX
Junior
1986	CA-VMD Junior Championship		3rd place, bronze medalist(s)				
1987	Sdushor Championships		1st place, gold medalist(s)				
1988	SKA Championships		1st place, gold medalist(s)				
1988	Ukrainian Championships		1st place, gold medalist(s)				
1988	URS-GDR Dual Meet		3rd place, bronze medalist(s)				
1989	Druzhba		4				
1989	URS National Championships		2nd place, silver medalist(s)	2nd place, silver medalist(s)	1st place, gold medalist(s)		1st place, gold medalist(s)
1990	Blume Memorial		3rd place, bronze medalist(s)				
1990	USSR vs The World		8				
1990	Moscow News/World Stars		9				
1990	USSR Cup		2nd place, silver medalist(s)				
1990	World Sports Fair		4				
1990	URS-USA Dual Meet		4				
1990	USSR Championships		4				
1990	Junior USSR Championships		1st place, gold medalist(s)	1st place, gold medalist(s)	1st place, gold medalist(s)	1st place, gold medalist(s)	1st place, gold medalist(s)
1990	Junior European Championships	1st place, gold medalist(s)	1st place, gold medalist(s)	1st place, gold medalist(s)	1st place, gold medalist(s)	1st place, gold medalist(s)	1st place, gold medalist(s)
Senior
1991	Moscow News/World Stars		1st place, gold medalist(s)	1st place, gold medalist(s)	1st place, gold medalist(s)	2nd place, silver medalist(s)	2nd place, silver medalist(s)
1991	Hungarian International		2nd place, silver medalist(s)	2nd place, silver medalist(s)		2nd place, silver medalist(s)	
1991	USSR Cup			2nd place, silver medalist(s)		4	2nd place, silver medalist(s)
1991	DTB Cup		2nd place, silver medalist(s)				
1991	Coca-Cola International		1st place, gold medalist(s)				
1991	Rome Grand Prix		3rd place, bronze medalist(s)				
1991	Grand Prix Finals (Torino)			2nd place, silver medalist(s)			1st place, gold medalist(s)
1991	URS-ITA Dual Meet		3rd place, bronze medalist(s)				
1991	URS-ESP Dual Meet		1st place, gold medalist(s)				
1991	USSR Championships		1st place, gold medalist(s)	4	3rd place, bronze medalist(s)	4	2nd place, silver medalist(s)
1991	World Championships	1st place, gold medalist(s)	5		2nd place, silver medalist(s)	2nd place, silver medalist(s)	
1992	CIS Cup	2nd place, silver medalist(s)	1st place, gold medalist(s)				
1992	Moscow News/World Stars		1st place, gold medalist(s)	2nd place, silver medalist(s)	1st place, gold medalist(s)	3rd place, bronze medalist(s)	1st place, gold medalist(s)
1992	CIS Championships		6	1st place, gold medalist(s)	1st place, gold medalist(s)	1st place, gold medalist(s)	2nd place, silver medalist(s)
1992	European Championships (Ukraine)		1st place, gold medalist(s)	1st place, gold medalist(s)	1st place, gold medalist(s)	2nd place, silver medalist(s)	3rd place, bronze medalist(s)
1992	Imperial Casino			2nd place, silver medalist(s)		2nd place, silver medalist(s)	
1992	DTB Cup		5				
1992	Gander Memorial		5				
1992	Olympic Games (Commonwealth of Independent States)	1st place, gold medalist(s)	1st place, gold medalist(s)		2nd place, silver medalist(s)		3rd place, bronze medalist(s)

== International scores ==
=== CIS ===
Year	Competition Description	Location	Apparatus	Rank-Final	Score-Final	Rank-Qualifying	Score-Qualifying
1992	Olympic Games	Barcelona	Team	1	395.666		
1992	Olympic Games	Barcelona	All-Around	1	39.737	9	78.848
1992	Olympic Games	Barcelona	Vault			9	19.787
1992	Olympic Games	Barcelona	Uneven Bars	2	9.975	1	19.899
1992	Olympic Games	Barcelona	Balance Beam			37	19.312
1992	Olympic Games	Barcelona	Floor Exercise	3	9.912	5	19.850
1992	World Championships	Paris	Balance Beam	WD			
1992	World Championships	Paris	Balance Beam (Semi−Final)			3	9.875
1992	World Championships	Paris	Balance Beam (Qualification)			1	9.937
1992	European Championships	Nantes	All-Around	1	39.725		
1992	European Championships	Nantes	Vault	1	9.950	4	9.900
1992	European Championships	Nantes	Uneven Bars	1	9.937	1	9.950
1992	European Championships	Nantes	Balance Beam	2	9.900	2	9.925
1992	European Championships	Nantes	Floor Exercise	3	9.887	1	9.950

=== Soviet Union ===
Year	Competition Description	Location	Apparatus	Rank-Final	Score-Final	Rank-Qualifying	Score-Qualifying
1991	World Championships	Indianapolis	Team	1	396.055		
1991	World Championships	Indianapolis	All-Around	5	39.636	3	79.298
1991	World Championships	Indianapolis	Vault			7	19.750
1991	World Championships	Indianapolis	Uneven Bars	2	9.950	3	19.875
1991	World Championships	Indianapolis	Balance Beam	2	9.950	5	19.849
1991	World Championships	Indianapolis	Floor Exercise			6	19.824
