= Lisa Read =

Australian gymnast

Personal information
- Nationality: Australian
- Born: 26 August 1973 (age 52)

Sport
- Sport: Gymnastics
Medal record
Gymnastics
Representing Australia
Commonwealth Games
Silver medal – second place	1990 Auckland	Women's Team

Lisa Read (born 26 August 1973) is an Australian gymnast. She competed in six events at the 1992 Summer Olympics. In 1987, she competed in the WAG junior national finals, finishing 1st out of 27 overall, whilst also winning the bars, beam and floor finals, and placing second in the vault final. In 1988, she was awarded the WAG junior gymnast of the year by The Australian Gymnast.
