= Tanya Maslarska =

Bulgarian artistic gymnast (born 1975)

Tanya Lazarova Maslarska (Bulgarian: Таня Лазарова Масларска) (born August 15, 1975) is a Bulgarian former artistic gymnast. She competed at the 1992 Summer Olympics. She is now a competitive coach for girls gymnastics. She coaches at Gymnastics Learning Center, in Shrewsbury, Massachusetts.
