= Vanda Hădărean =

Romanian gymnast

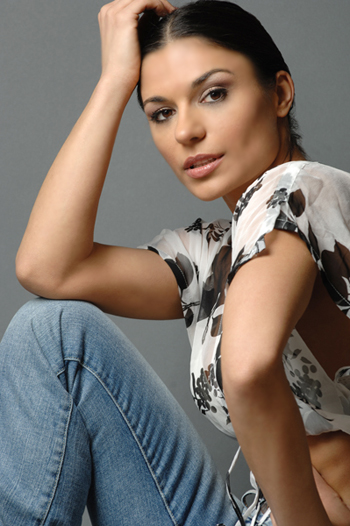

Personal information
- Full name: Vanda Maria Hădărean
- Born: 3 May 1976 (age 50) Cluj-Napoca

Gymnastics career
- Discipline: Women's artistic gymnastics
- Country represented: Romania
- Head coach: Octavian Belu
- Assistant coach: Mariana Bitang
- Retired: 1994
Medal record
Olympic Games
Silver medal – second place	1992 Barcelona	Team all-around
World Championships
Bronze medal – third place	1991 Indianapolis	Team all-around
European Championships
Bronze medal – third place	1992 Nantes	All-Around

Vanda Maria Hădărean (born 3 May 1976 in Cluj-Napoca, Romania) is a retired Romanian artistic gymnast who competed in international events between 1990 and 1993. She is an Olympic silver medalist and a world bronze medalist with the team and a European all around bronze medalist. She is also a successful fitness model and she has won various world class fitness competitions. She is a four-time Ms. Fitness World (2008, 2009, 2010 and 2011) and a four-time Ms. Fitness Canada (2006–2009). She also coaches, trains, provides consultation services to gymnasts and fitness models under the brand name “Inspired by Vanda”. She is also known for her breakout photo series in the Romanian Playboy magazine.

== Gymnastics career ==
Hădărean began gymnastics at the age of five, after a local coach spotted her talent and potential while she was playing in the park. At 13, she was selected to the Junior National team and moved to Onesti to train. During her junior career she won the all around title at the Junior European Championships in 1991, the gold medal on uneven bars and placed sixth on beam and tied for the fourth place on floor.

=== Senior gymnastics career ===
As a senior gymnast Hădărean was a consistent member of the Romanian team, helping the team to win the bronze medal at the 1991 World Championships and the silver medal at the 1992 Olympic Games. Individually she won the bronze medal in the all around event at the 1992 European championships. At the same competition she placed sixth on uneven bars and seventh on floor. During her senior career she was often overshadowed by many of the other strong Romanians of her time such as Lavinia Miloșovici, Cristina Bontaș, and Gina Gogean. As a result, she did not have as many opportunities to compete in individual events due to the 3-per-country rule. For example, at the 1992 Olympic Games Hădărean placed eleventh in the qualification for the all around event behind Bontaș, third, Miloșovici, fourth, and Gogean, seventh.

== Coaching career ==
Hădărean retired from competitive gymnastics in 1994. After graduating high school in Deva she moved on to a sports university. Shortly after enrolling in the university, she received a coaching position in Canada that she accepted. Hadarean quit school and moved to Canada where she coached at Mountain Star Gymnastics in Hamilton, Ontario and a second gym in Peterborough, Ontario. After more than two years coaching in Canada, she moved to the US to coach in Houston, Texas at Moceanu Gymnastics Incorporated (MGI). When MGI closed, she moved to South Carolina to coach at Golden Strip Gymnastics (now renamed Champions Gymnastics). This position was short-lived however, and she returned to Romania. Back home, Hădărean began working for a private aerobics club, EOS Aerobic Centre, in Cluj-Napoca. At the age of 24, she returned to Canada in early November 2000, and began coaching at Mountain Star Gymnastics in Hamilton again. In mid-2001 she began a new coaching position at Tumblers Gymnastics Centre in Ottawa, Canada's capital. She served as the club's first provincial-level coach, focusing on choreography and strengthening the club's female elite program.

== Fitness career ==
Following the advice of a good friend Hădărean started to compete in fitness modeling and fitness routines. She had a successful debut in fitness in 2005 by winning the Ms. Fitness Canada title and finishing fourth at the Ms. World Fitness event. She continued her fitness career by winning three more Ms. Fitness Canada titles (2006, 2007, 2008), a second place at Ms. World Fitness in 2007 and four consecutive Ms. World Fitness titles (2008, 2009, 2010 and 2011). Hădărean was on the cover of several magazines such as “Ms. Fitness Magazine”, Spring 2008 and "Oxygen", October 2009.

She is also a successful fitness coach. Three of the girls coached by her at Tumblers reached the podium in the junior and teen events at the 2008 Ms. Fitness Canada competition. Emily MacDougall and Alexa Charett came first and second in the teen event and Emily Tippins placed second in the junior category.

== Brand name ==
Currently Hădărean coaches and trains through her signature “Inspired by Vanda” programs at Soma Health and Fitness Ottawa Canada. She also makes promotional appearances and provides consultation services to gymnasts and other fitness, fitness model, and figure competitors.

== Awards ==
She was twice awarded the title “Gymnast of the Year” by her hometown Cluj and once awarded “Gymnast of the Year” by Neutron Sports Canada.
