= Choi Gyong-hui =

North Korean gymnast (born 1973)

Personal information
- Nationality: North Korean
- Born: 23 May 1973 (age 52)

Sport
- Sport: Gymnastics

Korean name
- Hangul: 최경희
- RR: Choe Gyeonghui
- MR: Ch'oe Kyŏnghŭi

Choi Gyong-hui (Korean: 최경희; born 23 May 1973) is a North Korean gymnast. She competed in six events at the 1992 Summer Olympics.
