= Elvira Becks =

Dutch gymnast

Personal information
- Nationality: Dutch
- Born: 8 May 1976 (age 49) Nijmegen, Netherlands

Sport
- Sport: Gymnastics

Elvira Becks (born 8 May 1976) is a Dutch gymnast. She competed in five events at the 1992 Summer Olympics.
