= Ri Chun-mi =

North Korean gymnast (born 1976)

Personal information
- Nationality: North Korean
- Born: 3 November 1976 (age 48)

Sport
- Sport: Gymnastics

Ri Chun-mi (born 3 November 1976) is a North Korean gymnast. She competed in six events at the 1992 Summer Olympics.
