= Gymnastics at the 1992 Summer Olympics =

Gymnastics at the Games of the XXV Olympiad
- Venue: Palau Sant Jordi (artistic); Palau dels Esports de Barcelona (rhythmic)
- Dates: 28 July – 8 August 1992
- Competitors: 227 from 34 nations

At the 1992 Summer Olympics, two different gymnastics were contested: artistic gymnastics and rhythmic gymnastics. The artistic gymnastics events were held at the Palau Sant Jordi from July 28 through August 2. The rhythmic gymnastics event were held at the Palau dels Esports de Barcelona from August 6 through 8th.

In artistic gymnastics, the New Life rule was introduced at the Olympic Games. Under this rule, a gymnast's scores in the compulsory and optional rounds were not carried over to the all-around and apparatus finals. A gymnast's final standing in both the all-around and apparatus finals was based solely on the scores received by the gymnast during those competitions.

== Artistic gymnastics ==
=== Format of competition ===
The gymnastics competition at the 1992 Summer Olympics was carried out in three stages:

- Competition I – The team competition and qualification round in which gymnasts, including those who were not part of a team, performed both compulsory and optional exercises. Only the five highest scores earned by team members on each apparatus during each round were used to determine the overall team total. The thirty-six highest-scoring gymnasts in the all-around qualified to the individual all-around competition. The eight highest-scoring gymnasts on each apparatus qualified to the final for that apparatus.
- Competition II – The individual all-around competition, in which those who qualified from Competition I performed exercises on each apparatus. The final score of each gymnast was determined by adding the scores earned by him or her on each of the six apparatuses in the men's competition and each of the four apparatuses in the women's competition.
- Competition III – The apparatus finals, in which those who qualified during Competition I performed an exercise on the individual apparatus on which he or she had qualified. The final score of each gymnast determined solely by the score earned by him or her on the apparatus during this competition.

Each country was limited to three gymnasts in the all-around final and two gymnasts in each apparatus final.

=== Men's events ===
Games	Gold	Silver	Bronze
Team all-around	Unified Team; Valery Belenky; Ihor Korobchynskyi; Hrihoriy Misyutin; Vitaly Scherbo; Rustam Sharipov; Alexei Voropaev	China; Guo Linyao; Li Chunyang; Li Dashuang; Li Ge; Li Jing; Li Xiaoshuang	Japan; Yutaka Aihara; Takashi Chinen; Yoshiaki Hatakeda; Yukio Iketani; Masayuki Matsunaga; Daisuke Nishikawa
Individual all-around	Vitaly Scherbo; Unified Team (Belarus)	Hrihoriy Misyutin; Unified Team (Ukraine)	Valery Belenky; Unified Team (Azerbaijan)
Floor exercise	Li Xiaoshuang; China	Yukio Iketani; Japan Hrihoriy Misyutin; Unified Team (Ukraine)	none awarded
Pommel horse	Vitaly Scherbo; Unified Team (Belarus) Pae Gil-Su; North Korea	none awarded	Andreas Wecker; Germany
Rings	Vitaly Scherbo; Unified Team (Belarus)	Li Jing; China	Andreas Wecker; Germany Li Xiaoshuang; China
Vault	Vitaly Scherbo; Unified Team (Belarus)	Hrihoriy Misyutin; Unified Team (Ukraine)	Yoo Ok-Ryul; South Korea
Parallel bars	Vitaly Scherbo; Unified Team (Belarus)	Li Jing; China	Ihor Korobchynskyi; Unified Team (Ukraine) Guo Linyao; China; Masayuki Matsunaga; Japan
Horizontal bar	Trent Dimas; United States	Hrihoriy Misyutin; Unified Team (Ukraine) Andreas Wecker; Germany	none awarded

=== Women's events ===
Games	Gold	Silver	Bronze
Team all-around	Unified Team; Svetlana Boginskaya; Oksana Chusovitina; Rozalia Galiyeva; Elena Grudneva; Tatiana Gutsu; Tatiana Lysenko	Romania; Cristina Bontaș; Gina Gogean; Vanda Hădărean; Lavinia Miloșovici; Maria Neculiță; Mirela Pașca	United States; Wendy Bruce; Dominique Dawes; Shannon Miller; Betty Okino; Kerri Strug; Kim Zmeskal
Individual all-around	Tatiana Gutsu; Unified Team (Ukraine)	Shannon Miller; United States	Lavinia Miloșovici; Romania
Vault	Lavinia Miloșovici; Romania Henrietta Ónodi; Hungary	none awarded	Tatiana Lysenko; Unified Team (Ukraine)
Uneven bars	Lu Li; China	Tatiana Gutsu; Unified Team (Ukraine)	Shannon Miller; United States
Balance beam	Tatiana Lysenko; Unified Team (Ukraine)	Lu Li; China Shannon Miller; United States	none awarded
Floor exercise	Lavinia Miloșovici; Romania	Henrietta Ónodi; Hungary	Cristina Bontaș; Romania Shannon Miller; United States Tatiana Gutsu; Unified Team (Ukraine)

== Rhythmic gymnastics ==
Games	Gold	Silver	Bronze
Individual all-around	Alexandra Timoshenko; Unified Team (Ukraine)	Carolina Pascual; Spain	Oxana Skaldina; Unified Team (Ukraine)

== Medal table ==
Rank	Nation	Gold	Silver	Bronze	Total
1	Unified Team	10	5	5	20
2	China	2	4	2	8
3	Romania	2	1	2	5
4	United States	1	2	3	6
5	Hungary	1	1	0	2
6	North Korea	1	0	0	1
7	Germany	0	1	2	3
7	Japan	0	1	2	3
9	Spain	0	1	0	1
10	South Korea	0	0	1	1
Totals (10 entries)		17	16	17	50

== Participating nations ==
- Argentina (3)
- Australia (7)
- Belgium (2)
- Brazil (3)
- Bulgaria (14)
- Canada (11)
- China (14)
- Cyprus (2)
- Czechoslovakia (7)
- Finland (1)
- France (11)
- Germany (13)
- Great Britain (10)
- Greece (2)
- Guatemala (1)
- Hungary (14)
- Independent Olympic Participants (2)
- Israel (1)
- Italy (10)
- Japan (11)
- Mexico (2)
- Netherlands (1)
- North Korea (11)
- Norway (1)
- Poland (2)
- Puerto Rico (1)
- Romania (14)
- Slovenia (1)
- South Korea (10)
- Spain (10)
- Sweden (1)
- Switzerland (6)
- Unified Team (14)
- United States (14)

== See also ==
- 1992 World Artistic Gymnastics Championships
