= Gymnastics at the 1994 Goodwill Games =

- Location: Saint Petersburg, Russia

At the 1994 Goodwill Games, two different gymnastics disciplines were contested: artistic gymnastics and rhythmic gymnastics.

== Artistic Gymnastics ==
=== Medalists ===
| Event | Gold | Silver | Bronze |
|---|---|---|---|
Men
| Team all-around | Russia; Dmitri Vasilenko; Alexei Nemov; Alexei Voropaev; Yevgeny Shabayev | Belarus; Ivan Pavlovsky; Andrei Kan; Vitaly Rudnitsky; Alexander Shostak | United States; Drew Durbin; Blaine Wilson; Scott Keswick; Chainey Umphrey |
| Individual all-around | (Russia) Alexei Nemov | (Russia) Alexei Voropaev | (Russia) Yevgeny Shabayev |
| Floor | (Russia) Alexei Nemov (Ukraine) Grigory Misutin | none awarded | (Russia) Dmitri Vasilenko |
| Pommel horse | (Russia) Alexei Nemov (Ukraine) Grigory Misutin | none awarded | (Belarus) Alexander Shostak |
| Rings | (Romania) Dan Burinca | (Russia) Alexei Voropaev | (Russia) Dmitri Vasilenko (United States) Scott Keswick |
| Vault | (Ukraine) Grigory Misutin | (Russia) Yevgeny Shabayev | (Russia) Alexei Voropaev |
| Parallel bars | (Russia) Yevgeny Shabayev (China) Dong Chon | none awarded | (Russia) Alexei Nemov |
| High bar | (Russia) Alexei Voropaev | (Romania) Nistor Șandro | (China) Chen Lan |
Women
| Team all-around | Russia; Svetlana Khorkina; Dina Kochetkova; Oksana Fabrichnova; Elena Grosheva | Romania; Ionela Loaies; Andreea Cacovean; Angela Ghimpu; Ana Maria Bican | Ukraine; Lilia Podkopayeva; Oksana Knizhnik; Tatiana Malaya; Irina Bulakhova |
| Individual all-around | (Russia) Dina Kochetkova | (United States) Shannon Miller | (Russia) Elena Grosheva |
| Vault | (Ukraine) Lilia Podkopayeva | (United States) Shannon Miller | (Russia) Svetlana Khorkina |
| Uneven bars | (Russia) Svetlana Khorkina | (United States) Shannon Miller | (Belarus) Elena Piskun (Russia) Dina Kochetkova |
| Balance beam | (United States) Shannon Miller | (Russia) Oksana Fabrichnova | (United States) Marianna Webster |
| Floor | (United States) Shannon Miller | (Russia) Dina Kochetkova | (Ukraine) Lilia Podkopayeva |
Mixed
| Team All-Around | Belarus / Ukraine; Alexander Shostak; Grigory Misutin; Elena Piskun; Lilia Podkopayeva | Russia; Alexei Nemov; Dmitri Vasilenko; Svetlana Khorkina; Oksana Fabrichnova | Russia / Uzbekistan; Alexei Voropaev; Yevgeny Shabayev; Elena Grosheva; Oksana Chusovitina |

== Rhythmic Gymnastics ==
=== Medalists ===
| Event | Gold | Silver | Bronze |
|---|---|---|---|
Individual
| All-Around | Amina Zaripova (RUS) | Kateryna Serebrianska (UKR) | Olga Gontar (BLR) |
| Hoop | Amina Zaripova (RUS) | Olga Gontar (BLR) | Kateryna Serebrianska (UKR) |
| Ball | Amina Zaripova (RUS) | Olga Gontar (BLR) | Kateryna Serebrianska (UKR) |
| Clubs | Kateryna Serebrianska (UKR); Amina Zaripova (RUS) | None awarded | Olga Gontar (BLR) |
| Ribbon | Kateryna Serebrianska (UKR) | Olga Gontar (BLR) | Amina Zaripova (RUS); Katarzyna Skorupinska (POL) |

== Details ==
=== Artistic Gymnastics ===
==== Men ====
===== Team All-Around =====
| Rank | Country | Total |
|---|---|---|
| 1st place, gold medalist(s) | Russia (RUS) | 171.200 |
| 2nd place, silver medalist(s) | Belarus (BLR) | 167.875 |
| 3rd place, bronze medalist(s) | United States of America (USA) | 165.525 |
| 4 | Romania (ROU) | 164.950 |
| 5 | China (CHN) | 163.950 |
| 6 | Italy (ITA) | 163.600 |
| 7 | Japan (JPN) | 160.550 |

===== Individual All- Around =====
| Rank | Gymnast | Floor (gymnastics) | Pommel horse | Rings (gymnastics) | Vault (gymnastics) | Parallel bars | Horizontal bar | Total |
|---|---|---|---|---|---|---|---|---|
| 1st place, gold medalist(s) | Alexei Nemov (RUS) | 9.650 | 9.700 | 9.400 | 9.700 | 9.775 | 9.650 | 57.875 |
| 2nd place, silver medalist(s) | Alexei Voropaev (RUS) | 9.600 | 9.100 | 9.800 | 9.675 | 9.550 | 9.050 | 56.775 |
| 3rd place, bronze medalist(s) | Yevgeny Shabayev (RUS) | 9.500 | 9.725 | 9.550 | 9.650 | 8.400 | 9.700 | 56.525 |
| 4 | Grigory Misutin (UKR) | 9.600 | 9.700 | 9.750 | 9.650 | 8.800 | 9.000 | 56.500 |
| 5 | Wang Dong (CHN) | 9.050 | 9.300 | 9.450 | 9.300 | 9.450 | 9.000 | 55.550 |
| 6 | Chainey Umphrey (USA) | 9.150 | 8.800 | 9.500 | 9.200 | 9.500 | 9.300 | 55.450 |
| 7 | Scott Keswick (USA) | 9.250 | 8.550 | 9.775 | 9.150 | 9.100 | 9.500 | 55.325 |
| 8 | Nistor Șandro (ROU) | 8.850 | 9.100 | 9.200 | 9.400 | 9.050 | 9.600 | 55.200 |
| 9 | Andrei Kan (BLR) | 9.550 | 8.750 | 9.350 | 9.300 | 9.475 | 8.550 | 54.975 |
| 10 | Paolo Bucci (ITA) | 9.150 | 9.000 | 9.500 | 9.100 | 9.200 | 9.000 | 54.950 |
| 11 | Vitaly Rudnitsky (BLR) | 9.525 | 8.700 | 8.900 | 9.150 | 9.375 | 9.200 | 54.850 |
| 12 | Giovanni d'Innocenzo (ITA) | 8.550 | 8.950 | 9.150 | 9.100 | 9.300 | 8.950 | 54.000 |
| 13 | Cristian Leric (ROU) | 8.500 | 8.650 | 8.800 | 9.500 | 9.400 | 9.000 | 53.850 |
| 14 | Ivan Pavlovsky (BLR) | 9.400 | 8.400 | 7.950 | 9.200 | 9.000 | 9.100 | 53.050 |

===== Floor =====
| Rank | Gymnast | Score |
|---|---|---|
| 1st place, gold medalist(s) | Grigory Misutin (UKR) | 9.750 |
| 1st place, gold medalist(s) | Alexei Nemov (RUS) | 9.750 |
| 3rd place, bronze medalist(s) | Dmitri Vasilenko (RUS) | 9.650 |
| 4 | Vitaly Rudnitsky (BLR) | 9.525 |
| 5 | Takashi Chinen (JPN) | 9.100 |
| 6 | Paolo Bucci (ITA) | 9.000 |
| 7 | Andrei Kan (BLR) | 8.900 |
| 8 | Drew Durbin (USA) | 8.700 |

===== Pommel Horse =====
| Rank | Gymnast | Score |
|---|---|---|
| 1st place, gold medalist(s) | Alexei Nemov (RUS) | 9.700 |
| 1st place, gold medalist(s) | Grigory Misutin (UKR) | 9.700 |
| 3rd place, bronze medalist(s) | Alexander Shostak (BLR) | 9.650 |
| 4 | Dmitri Vasilenko (RUS) | 9.450 |
| 5 | Drew Durbin (USA) | 9.400 |
| 6 | Giovanni d'Innocenzo (ITA) | 9.300 |
| 7 | Cristian Leric (ROU) | 9.100 |
| 7 | Andrei Kan (BLR) | 9.100 |

===== Rings =====
| Rank | Gymnast | Score |
|---|---|---|
| 1st place, gold medalist(s) | Dan Burinca (ROU) | 9.800 |
| 2nd place, silver medalist(s) | Alexei Voropaev (RUS) | 9.775 |
| 3rd place, bronze medalist(s) | Dmitri Vasilenko (RUS) | 9.700 |
| 3rd place, bronze medalist(s) | Scott Keswick (USA) | 9.700 |
| 5 | Grigory Misutin (UKR) | 9.600 |
| 6 | Vitaly Rudnitsky (BLR) | 9.575 |
| 6 | Paolo Bucci (ITA) | 9.575 |
| 8 | Chainey Umphrey (USA) | 9.550 |

===== Vault =====
| Rank | Gymnast | Score |
|---|---|---|
| 1st place, gold medalist(s) | Grigory Misutin (UKR) | 9.550 |
| 2nd place, silver medalist(s) | Yevgeny Shabayev (RUS) | 9.512 |
| 3rd place, bronze medalist(s) | Alexei Voropaev (RUS) | 9.500 |
| 4 | Scott Keswick (USA) | 9.350 |
| 5 | Cristian Leric (ROU) | 9.275 |
| 6 | Ivan Pavlovsky (BLR) | 9.225 |
| 7 | Robert Raciulet (ROU) | 9.150 |
| 8 | Wang Dong (CHN) | 9.100 |

===== Parallel Bars =====
| Rank | Gymnast | Score |
|---|---|---|
| 1st place, gold medalist(s) | Yevgeny Shabayev (RUS) | 9.725 |
| 1st place, gold medalist(s) | Dun Chon (CHN) | 9.725 |
| 3rd place, bronze medalist(s) | Alexei Nemov (RUS) | 9.700 |
| 4 | Alexander Shostak (BLR) | 9.625 |
| 4 | Cristian Leric (ROU) | 9.625 |
| 4 | Andrei Kan (BLR) | 9.625 |
| 7 | Yuan Chunsin (CHN) | 9.400 |
| 8 | Grigory Misutin (UKR) | 9.000 |

===== High Bar =====
| Rank | Gymnast | Score |
|---|---|---|
| 1st place, gold medalist(s) | Alexei Voropaev (RUS) | 9.750 |
| 2nd place, silver medalist(s) | Nistor Șandro (ROU) | 9.575 |
| 3rd place, bronze medalist(s) | Chen Lan (CHN) | 9.500 |
| 4 | Drew Durbin (USA) | 9.475 |
| 5 | Giovanni d'Innocenzo (ITA) | 9.450 |
| 5 | Chainey Umphrey (USA) | 9.450 |
| 7 | Dan Burinca (ROU) | 9.100 |
| 8 | Alexei Nemov (RUS) | 8.850 |

==== Women ====
===== Team All-Around =====
| Rank | Country | Total |
|---|---|---|
| 1st place, gold medalist(s) | Russia (RUS) | 117.375 |
| 2nd place, silver medalist(s) | Romania (ROU) | 116.000 |
| 3rd place, bronze medalist(s) | Ukraine (UKR) | 115.650 |
| 4 | United States of America (USA) | 115.375 |
| 5 | China (CHN) | 112.650 |
| 6 | Spain (SPA) | 111.275 |

===== Individual All-Around =====
| Rank | Gymnast | Vault (gymnastics) | Uneven bars | Balance beam | Floor (gymnastics) | Total |
|---|---|---|---|---|---|---|
| 1st place, gold medalist(s) | Dina Kochetkova (RUS) | 9.763 | 9.787 | 9.850 | 9.925 | 39.325 |
| 2nd place, silver medalist(s) | Shannon Miller (USA) | 9.731 | 9.750 | 9.887 | 9.900 | 39.268 |
| 3rd place, bronze medalist(s) | Elena Grosheva (RUS) | 9.669 | 9.825 | 9.637 | 9.812 | 38.943 |
| 4 | Lilia Podkopayeva (UKR) | 9.703 | 9.750 | 9.587 | 9.850 | 38.893 |
| 5 | Oksana Chusovitina (UZB) | 9.731 | 9.650 | 9.662 | 9.775 | 38.818 |
| 6 | Ana Maria Bican (ROU) | 9.694 | 9.625 | 9.712 | 9.762 | 38.793 |
| 7 | Ionela Loaies (ROU) | 9.525 | 9.625 | 9.450 | 9.650 | 38.250 |
| 8 | Elena Piskun (BLR) | 9.868 | 9.750 | 9.150 | 9.462 | 38.230 |
| 9 | Monica Martin (ESP) | 9.687 | 9.562 | 9.350 | 9.612 | 38.211 |
| 10 | Oksana Knizhnik (UKR) | 9.675 | 9.200 | 9.675 | 9.625 | 38.175 |
| 11 | Li Chan (CHN) | 9.424 | 9.512 | 9.425 | 9.437 | 37.798 |
| 12 | Oksana Fabrichnova (RUS) | 9.293 | 9.537 | 9.762 | 9.137 | 37.729 |
| 13 | Angela Ghimpu (ROU) | 9.743 | 8.987 | 9.437 | 9.525 | 37.692 |
| 14 | Marianna Webster (USA) | 9.493 | 9.475 | 9.562 | 8.887 | 37.417 |
| 15 | Luo Li (CHN) | 9.387 | 9.237 | 9.312 | 9.175 | 37.111 |

===== Vault =====
| Rank | Gymnast | Score |
|---|---|---|
| 1st place, gold medalist(s) | Lilia Podkopayeva (UKR) | 9.831 |
| 2nd place, silver medalist(s) | Shannon Miller (USA) | 9.824 |
| 3rd place, bronze medalist(s) | Svetlana Khorkina (RUS) | 9.787 |
| 4 | Ana Maria Bican (ROU) | 9.731 |
| 5 | Oksana Chusovitina (UZB) | 9.706 |
| 6 | Dina Kochetkova (RUS) | 9.693 |
| 6 | Elena Piskun (BLR) | 9.693 |
| 8 | Monica Martin (ESP) | 9.637 |

===== Uneven Bars =====
| Rank | Gymnast | Score |
|---|---|---|
| 1st place, gold medalist(s) | Svetlana Khorkina (RUS) | 9.862 |
| 2nd place, silver medalist(s) | Shannon Miller (USA) | 9.850 |
| 3rd place, bronze medalist(s) | Elena Piskun (BLR) | 9.787 |
| 3rd place, bronze medalist(s) | Dina Kochetkova (RUS) | 9.787 |
| 5 | Oksana Chusovitina (UZB) | 9.775 |
| 6 | Ana Maria Bican (ROU) | 9.712 |
| 7 | Lilia Podkopayeva (UKR) | 9.600 |
| 8 | Irina Bulakhova (UKR) | 9.162 |

===== Balance Beam =====
| Rank | Gymnast | Score |
|---|---|---|
| 1st place, gold medalist(s) | Shannon Miller (USA) | 9.875 |
| 2nd place, silver medalist(s) | Oksana Fabrichnova (RUS) | 9.800 |
| 3rd place, bronze medalist(s) | Marianna Webster (USA) | 9.725 |
| 4 | Ana Maria Bican (ROU) | 9.650 |
| 4 | Dina Kochetkova (RUS) | 9.650 |
| 6 | Elena Piskun (BLR) | 9.362 |
| 7 | Angela Ghimpu (ROU) | 9.175 |
| 8 | Monica Martin (ESP) | 9.162 |

===== Floor =====
| Rank | Gymnast | Score |
|---|---|---|
| 1st place, gold medalist(s) | Shannon Miller (USA) | 9.937 |
| 2nd place, silver medalist(s) | Dina Kochetkova (RUS) | 9.925 |
| 3rd place, bronze medalist(s) | Lilia Podkopayeva (UKR) | 9.887 |
| 4 | Oksana Chusovitina (UZB) | 9.862 |
| 5 | Svetlana Khorkina (RUS) | 9.737 |
| 6 | Irina Bulakhova (UKR) | 9.587 |
| 7 | Din Yui (CHN) | 9.537 |
| 8 | Marianna Webster (USA) | 9.362 |

==== Mixed ====
===== Team All-Around =====
| Rank | Country | Total |
|---|---|---|
| 1st place, gold medalist(s) | Belarus (BLR) / Ukraine (UKR) | 96.137 |
| 2nd place, silver medalist(s) | Russia (RUS) | 95.712 |
| 3rd place, bronze medalist(s) | Russia (RUS) / Uzbekistan (UZB) | 95.662 |
| 4 | United States (USA) | 94.012 |
| 5 | Ukraine (UKR) / Belarus (BLR) | 93.987 |
| 6 | Romania (ROU) | 92.250 |
| 7 | China (CHN) | 92.100 |
| 8 | Japan (JPN) / Kazakhstan (KAZ) / Belgium (BEL) | 89.975 |
| 9 | United States (USA) | 88.562 |

=== Rhythmic Gymnastics ===
==== Individual All-Around ====
| Rank | Gymnast | Score |
|---|---|---|
| 1st place, gold medalist(s) | Amina Zaripova (RUS) | 39.000 |
| 2nd place, silver medalist(s) | Olga Gontar (BLR) | 38.400 |
| 3rd place, bronze medalist(s) | Kateryna Serebrianska (UKR) | 38.375 |
| 4 | Amaya Cardenoso (ESP) | 37.500 |
| 5 | Katarzyna Skorupinska (POL) | 37.350 |
| 6 | Albena Angova (BLR) | 37.125 |
| 7 | Caroline Hunt (USA) | 36.750 |
| 8 | Olga Vershinina (RUS) | 35.250 |

==== Hoop ====
| Rank | Gymnast | Score |
|---|---|---|
| 1st place, gold medalist(s) | Amina Zaripova (RUS) | 9.775 |
| 2nd place, silver medalist(s) | Olga Gontar (BLR) | 9.750 |
| 3rd place, bronze medalist(s) | Kateryna Serebrianska (UKR) | 9.725 |
| 4 | Katarzyna Skorupinska (POL) | 9.400 |
| 4 | Amaya Cardenoso (ESP) | 9.400 |
| 6 | Albena Angova (BLR) | 9.250 |
| 7 | Caroline Hunt (USA) | 9.200 |
| 8 | Olga Vershinina (RUS) | 9.000 |

==== Ball ====
| Rank | Gymnast | Score |
|---|---|---|
| 1st place, gold medalist(s) | Amina Zaripova (RUS) | 9.800 |
| 2nd place, silver medalist(s) | Olga Gontar (BLR) | 9.725 |
| 3rd place, bronze medalist(s) | Kateryna Serebrianska (UKR) | 9.625 |
| 4 | Katarzyna Skorupinska (POL) | 9.400 |
| 5 | Caroline Hunt (USA) | 9.325 |
| 6 | Olga Vershinina (RUS) | 9.025 |
| 7 | Amaya Cardenoso (ESP) | 8.700 |
| 8 | Albena Angova (BLR) | 8.450 |

==== Clubs ====
| Rank | Gymnast | Score |
|---|---|---|
| 1st place, gold medalist(s) | Kateryna Serebrianska (UKR) | 9.750 |
| 1st place, gold medalist(s) | Amina Zaripova (RUS) | 9.750 |
| 3rd place, bronze medalist(s) | Olga Gontar (BLR) | 9.700 |
| 4 | Amaya Cardenoso (ESP) | 9.425 |
| 5 | Katarzyna Skorupinska (POL) | 9.400 |
| 6 | Albena Angova (BLR) | 9.375 |
| 7 | Caroline Hunt (USA) | 9.225 |
| 8 | Olga Vershinina (RUS) | 9.050 |

==== Ribbon ====
| Rank | Gymnast | Score |
|---|---|---|
| 1st place, gold medalist(s) | Kateryna Serebrianska (UKR) | 9.775 |
| 2nd place, silver medalist(s) | Olga Gontar (BLR) | 9.650 |
| 3rd place, bronze medalist(s) | Amina Zaripova (RUS) | 9.450 |
| 3rd place, bronze medalist(s) | Katarzyna Skorupinska (POL) | 9.450 |
| 5 | Amaya Cardenoso (ESP) | 9.425 |
| 6 | Albena Angova (BLR) | 9.375 |
| 7 | Caroline Hunt (USA) | 9.250 |
| 8 | Olga Vershinina (RUS) | 8.650 |
