= Russia at the World Artistic Gymnastics Championships =

- Flag of Russia
- ISO: RUS
- Federation: Russian Gymnastics Federation
- Website: sportgymrus.ru
- Medals: Gold 36 Silver 45 Bronze 38 Total 119

Appearances
- 22; 1993, 1994, 1995, 1996, 1997, 1999, 2001, 2002, 2003, 2005, 2006, 2007, 2009, 2010, 2011, 2013, 2014, 2015, 2017, 2018, 2019, 2026 (Note: Competed under the banner of World Gymnastics 2 due to regulations by Dutch athorities but results are attributed to Russia by World Gymnastics)

Junior appearances
- 1; 2019

Russian Gymnastics Federation at the World Artistic Gymnastics Championships
- ISO: RGF
- Federation: Russian Gymnastics Federation
- Medals: Gold 1 Silver 1 Bronze 2 Total 4

Appearances
- 1; 2021

Individual Neutral Athletes from Russia at the World Artistic Gymnastics Championships
- ISO: AIN
- Federation: Russian Gymnastics Federation
- Medals: Gold 2 Silver 1 Bronze 1 Total 4

Appearances
- 1; 2025

Junior appearances
- 1; 2025

Russia first competed at the 1993 World Championships, after the fall of the Soviet Union. The Russian women won their first team gold in 2010 and the men won their first team gold in 2019.

In 2021 Russian athletes competed as the Russian Gymnastics Federation (RGF) due to sanctions in place against Russian sports. Russia was banned from participating at the 2022 and 2023 World Championships due to the 2022 Russian invasion of Ukraine. In 2025 a handful of Russian gymnasts were granted neutral status, allowing them to return to major competitions, starting with the 2025 World Championships.

== Medalists ==
Medal	Name	Year	Event
Silver	Sergey Kharkov	(United Kingdom) 1993 Birmingham	Men's all-around
Bronze	Natalia Bobrova	(United Kingdom) 1993 Birmingham	Women's floor exercise
Gold	Sergey Kharkov	(United Kingdom) 1993 Birmingham	Men's horizontal bar
Silver	Evgeni Chabaev, Evgeni Joukov, Dmitri Karbanenko, Alexei Nemov, Dmitri Trush, Dmitri Vasilenko, Alexei Voropaev	(Germany) 1994 Dortmund	Men's team
Bronze	Svetlana Khorkina, Dina Kochetkova, Elena Lebedeva, Oksana Fabrichnova, Elena Grosheva, Evgenia Roschina, Natalia Ivanova	(Germany) 1994 Dortmund	Women's team
Silver	Aleksey Voropayev	(Australia) 1994 Brisbane	Men's all-around
Bronze	Dina Kochetkova	(Australia) 1994 Brisbane	Women's all-around
Silver	Svetlana Khorkina	(Australia) 1994 Brisbane	Women's vault
Silver	Svetlana Khorkina	(Australia) 1994 Brisbane	Women's uneven bars
Bronze	Dina Kochetkova	(Australia) 1994 Brisbane	Women's uneven bars
Bronze	Oksana Fabrichnova	(Australia) 1994 Brisbane	Women's balance beam
Bronze	Alexei Nemov	(Australia) 1994 Brisbane	Men's parallel bars
Gold	Dina Kochetkova	(Australia) 1994 Brisbane	Women's floor exercise
Bronze	Yevgeny Shabayev	(Japan) 1995 Sabae	Men's all-around
Silver	Svetlana Khorkina	(Japan) 1995 Sabae	Women's all-around
Gold	Svetlana Khorkina	(Japan) 1995 Sabae	Women's uneven bars
Gold	Alexei Nemov	(Japan) 1995 Sabae	Men's vault
Silver	Aleksey Voropayev	(Puerto Rico) 1996 San Juan	Men's floor exercise
Bronze	Alexei Nemov	(Puerto Rico) 1996 San Juan	Men's pommel horse
Gold	Svetlana Khorkina	(Puerto Rico) 1996 San Juan	Women's uneven bars
Gold	Alexei Nemov	(Puerto Rico) 1996 San Juan	Men's vault
Gold	Dina Kochetkova	(Puerto Rico) 1996 San Juan	Women's balance beam
Silver	Alexei Nemov	(Puerto Rico) 1996 San Juan	Men's parallel bars
Bronze	Dmitri Vasilenko, Alexei Bondarenko, Alexei Voropaev, Alexei Nemov, Evgeni Ghukov, Nikolai Kryukov	(Switzerland) 1997 Lausanne	Men's team
Silver	Svetlana Khorkina, Yelena Produnova, Yevgeniya Kuznetsova, Svetlana Bakhtina, Elena Dolgopolova, Elena Grosheva	(Switzerland) 1997 Lausanne	Women's team
Silver	Alexei Bondarenko	(Switzerland) 1997 Lausanne	Men's all-around
Gold	Svetlana Khorkina	(Switzerland) 1997 Lausanne	Women's all-around
Bronze	Yelena Produnova	(Switzerland) 1997 Lausanne	Women's all-around
Gold	Alexei Nemov	(Switzerland) 1997 Lausanne	Men's floor exercise
Gold	Svetlana Khorkina	(Switzerland) 1997 Lausanne	Women's uneven bars
Silver	Nikolai Kryukov	(Switzerland) 1997 Lausanne	Men's vault
Silver	Svetlana Khorkina	(Switzerland) 1997 Lausanne	Women's balance beam
Silver	Svetlana Khorkina	(Switzerland) 1997 Lausanne	Women's floor exercise
Bronze	Yelena Produnova	(Switzerland) 1997 Lausanne	Women's floor exercise
Silver	Alexei Bondarenko, Nikolai Kryukov, Alexei Nemov, Maxim Aleshin, Rashid Kasumov, Evgeni Podgorni	(China) 1999 Tianjin	Men's team
Silver	Yelena Produnova, Elena Zamolodchikova, Svetlana Khorkina, Yekaterina Lobaznyuk, Yevgeniya Kuznetsova, Anna Kovaliova	(China) 1999 Tianjin	Women's team
Gold	Nikolai Kryukov	(China) 1999 Tianjin	Men's all-around
Bronze	Elena Zamolodchikova	(China) 1999 Tianjin	Women's all-around
Gold	Alexei Nemov	(China) 1999 Tianjin	Men's floor exercise
Gold	Elena Zamolodchikova	(China) 1999 Tianjin	Women's vault
Gold	Alexei Nemov	(China) 1999 Tianjin	Men's pommel horse
Bronze	Nikolai Kryukov	(China) 1999 Tianjin	Men's pommel horse
Gold	Svetlana Khorkina	(China) 1999 Tianjin	Women's uneven bars
Silver	Alexei Bondarenko	(China) 1999 Tianjin	Men's parallel bars
Bronze	Svetlana Khorkina	(China) 1999 Tianjin	Women's floor exercise
Silver	Svetlana Khorkina, Natalia Ziganshina, Ludmila Ezhova, Maria Zasypkina, Elena Zamolodchikova	(Belgium) 2001 Ghent	Women's team
Gold	Svetlana Khorkina	(Belgium) 2001 Ghent	Women's all-around
Silver	Natalia Ziganshina	(Belgium) 2001 Ghent	Women's all-around
Gold	Svetlana Khorkina	(Belgium) 2001 Ghent	Women's vault
Gold	Svetlana Khorkina	(Belgium) 2001 Ghent	Women's uneven bars
Silver	Ludmila Ezhova	(Belgium) 2001 Ghent	Women's balance beam
Bronze	Svetlana Khorkina	(Belgium) 2001 Ghent	Women's floor exercise
Gold	Elena Zamolodchikova	(Hungary) 2002 Debrecen	Women's vault
Silver	Natalia Ziganshina	(Hungary) 2002 Debrecen	Women's vault
Bronze	Ludmila Ezhova	(Hungary) 2002 Debrecen	Women's uneven bars
Gold	Svetlana Khorkina	(United States) 2003 Anaheim	Women's all-around
Silver	Elena Zamolodchikova	(United States) 2003 Anaheim	Women's vault
Bronze	Nikolai Kryukov	(United States) 2003 Anaheim	Men's pommel horse
Bronze	Ludmila Ezhova	(United States) 2003 Anaheim	Women's balance beam
Silver	Alexei Nemov	(United States) 2003 Anaheim	Men's parallel bars
Bronze	Alexei Nemov	(United States) 2003 Anaheim	Men's horizontal bar
Silver	Aleksandr Safoshkin	(Australia) 2005 Melbourne	Men's rings
Silver	Maxim Deviatovski, Dimitri Gogotov, Sergei Khorokhordin, Nikolai Kryukov, Yury Ryazanov, Aleksandr Safoshkin	(Denmark) 2006 Aarhus	Men's team
Bronze	Anna Grudko, Svetlana Klyukina, Polina Miller, Anna Pavlova, Kristina Pravdina, Elena Zamolodchikova	(Denmark) 2006 Aarhus	Women's team
Gold	Ksenia Semenova	(Germany) 2007 Stuttgart	Women's uneven bars
Bronze	Yuri Ryazanov	(United Kingdom) 2009 London	Men's all-around
Bronze	Anton Golotsutskov	(United Kingdom) 2009 London	Men's vault
Gold	Ksenia Afanasyeva, Aliya Mustafina, Tatiana Nabieva, Ksenia Semenova, Ekaterina Kurbatova, Anna Dementyeva	(Netherlands) 2010 Rotterdam	Women's team
Gold	Aliya Mustafina	(Netherlands) 2010 Rotterdam	Women's all-around
Silver	Aliya Mustafina	(Netherlands) 2010 Rotterdam	Women's vault
Silver	Aliya Mustafina	(Netherlands) 2010 Rotterdam	Women's uneven bars
Silver	Anton Golotsutskov	(Netherlands) 2010 Rotterdam	Men's vault
Silver	Aliya Mustafina	(Netherlands) 2010 Rotterdam	Women's floor exercise
Silver	Ksenia Afanasyeva, Viktoria Komova, Anna Dementyeva, Yulia Belokobylskaya, Tatiana Nabieva, Yulia Inshina	(Japan) 2011 Tokyo	Women's team
Silver	Viktoria Komova	(Japan) 2011 Tokyo	Women's all-around
Gold	Viktoria Komova	(Japan) 2011 Tokyo	Women's uneven bars
Silver	Tatiana Nabieva	(Japan) 2011 Tokyo	Women's uneven bars
Silver	Anton Golotsutskov	(Japan) 2011 Tokyo	Men's vault
Gold	Ksenia Afanasyeva	(Japan) 2011 Tokyo	Women's floor exercise
Bronze	Aliya Mustafina	(Belgium) 2013 Antwerp	Women's all-around
Bronze	Aliya Mustafina	(Belgium) 2013 Antwerp	Women's uneven bars
Silver	Aleksandr Balandin	(Belgium) 2013 Antwerp	Men's vault
Gold	Aliya Mustafina	(Belgium) 2013 Antwerp	Women's balance beam
Bronze	Aliya Mustafina, Tatiana Nabieva, Ekaterina Kramarenko, Alla Sosnitskaya, Daria Spiridonova, Maria Kharenkova, Polina Fedorova	(China) 2014 Nanning	Women's team
Gold	Denis Ablyazin	(China) 2014 Nanning	Men's floor exercise
Bronze	Daria Spiridonova	(China) 2014 Nanning	Women's uneven bars
Bronze	Denis Ablyazin	(China) 2014 Nanning	Men's rings
Bronze	Aliya Mustafina	(China) 2014 Nanning	Women's balance beam
Bronze	Aliya Mustafina	(China) 2014 Nanning	Women's floor exercise
Gold	Maria Paseka	(United Kingdom) 2015 Glasgow	Women's vault
Gold	Viktoria Komova	(United Kingdom) 2015 Glasgow	Women's uneven bars
Gold	Daria Spiridonova	(United Kingdom) 2015 Glasgow	Women's uneven bars
Silver	Ksenia Afanasyeva	(United Kingdom) 2015 Glasgow	Women's floor exercise
Bronze	Elena Eremina	(Canada) 2017 Montreal	Women's all-around
Gold	Maria Paseka	(Canada) 2017 Montreal	Women's vault
Silver	David Belyavskiy	(Canada) 2017 Montreal	Men's pommel horse
Silver	Elena Eremina	(Canada) 2017 Montreal	Women's uneven bars
Silver	Denis Ablyazin	(Canada) 2017 Montreal	Men's rings
Bronze	David Belyavskiy	(Canada) 2017 Montreal	Men's parallel bars
Silver	David Belyavskiy, Artur Dalaloyan, Nikolai Kuksenkov, Dmitrii Lankin, Nikita Nagornyy, Vladislav Poliashov	(Qatar) 2018 Doha	Men's team
Silver	Lilia Akhaimova, Irina Alexeeva, Angelina Melnikova, Aliya Mustafina, Angelina Simakova, Daria Spiridonova	(Qatar) 2018 Doha	Women's team
Gold	Artur Dalaloyan	(Qatar) 2018 Doha	Men's all-around
Bronze	Nikita Nagornyy	(Qatar) 2018 Doha	Men's all-around
Gold	Artur Dalaloyan	(Qatar) 2018 Doha	Men's floor exercise
Silver	Artur Dalaloyan	(Qatar) 2018 Doha	Men's vault
Bronze	Artur Dalaloyan	(Qatar) 2018 Doha	Men's parallel bars
Gold	Denis Ablyazin, David Belyavskiy, Artur Dalaloyan, Nikita Nagornyy, Ivan Stretovich, Vladislav Polyashov	(Germany) 2019 Stuttgart	Men's team
Silver	Anastasia Agafonova, Lilia Akhaimova, Angelina Melnikova, Aleksandra Shchekoldina, Daria Spiridonova, Maria Paseka	(Germany) 2019 Stuttgart	Women's team
Gold	Nikita Nagornyy	(Germany) 2019 Stuttgart	Men's all-around
Silver	Artur Dalaloyan	(Germany) 2019 Stuttgart	Men's all-around
Bronze	Angelina Melnikova	(Germany) 2019 Stuttgart	Women's all-around
Gold	Nikita Nagornyy	(Germany) 2019 Stuttgart	Men's vault
Silver	Artur Dalaloyan	(Germany) 2019 Stuttgart	Men's vault
Bronze	Angelina Melnikova	(Germany) 2019 Stuttgart	Women's floor exercise
Bronze	Artur Dalaloyan	(Germany) 2019 Stuttgart	Men's horizontal bar
Gold	Angelina Melnikova	(Japan) 2021 Kitakyushu (Note: Represented the Russian Gymnastics Federation)	Women's all-around
Bronze	Angelina Melnikova	(Japan) 2021 Kitakyushu	Women's vault
Bronze	Grigorii Klimentev	(Japan) 2021 Kitakyushu	Men's rings
Silver	Angelina Melnikova	(Japan) 2021 Kitakyushu	Women's floor exercise
Gold	Angelina Melnikova	(Indonesia) 2025 Jakarta (Note: Competed as Individual Neutral Athletes)	Women's all-around
Gold	Angelina Melnikova	(Indonesia) 2025 Jakarta	Women's vault
Silver	Angelina Melnikova	(Indonesia) 2025 Jakarta	Women's uneven bars
Bronze	Daniel Marinov	(Indonesia) 2025 Jakarta	Men's parallel bars
Silver	Arsenii Dukhno, Daniel Marinov, Sergey Naidin, Savelii Sieedin, Ilia Zaika, Mukhammadzhon Iakubov	(Netherlands) 2026 Rotterdam	Men's team
Silver	Liudmila Roshchina	(Netherlands) 2026 Rotterdam	Women's all-around
Bronze	Daniel Marinov	(Netherlands) 2026 Rotterdam	Men's parallel bars
Bronze	Sergei Naidin	(Netherlands) 2026 Rotterdam	Men's horizontal bar

== Medal tables ==
=== By gender ===
Gender	Gold	Silver	Bronze	Total
Women	26	25	23	74
Men	13	22	18	53

=== By event ===
Event	Gold	Silver	Bronze	Total
Women's uneven bars	9	5	4	18
Women's individual all-around	6	4	6	16
Women's vault	6	4	1	11
Men's floor exercise	4	1	0	5
Men's vault	3	6	1	10
Men's individual all-around	3	4	3	10
Women's floor exercise	2	4	6	12
Women's balance beam	2	2	3	7
Women's team	1	6	3	10
Men's team	1	5	1	7
Men's pommel horse	1	1	3	5
Men's horizontal bar	1	0	3	4
Men's parallel bars	0	3	5	8
Men's rings	0	2	2	4

== Junior World medalists ==
Medal	Name	Year	Event
Gold	Elena Gerasimova, Viktoria Listunova, Vladislava Urazova, Yana Vorona	(Hungary) 2019 Győr	Girls' team
Gold	Viktoria Listunova	(Hungary) 2019 Győr	Girls' all-around
Silver	Vladislava Urazova	(Hungary) 2019 Győr	Girls' all-around
Bronze	Vladislava Urazova	(Hungary) 2019 Győr	Girls' vault
Gold	Vladislava Urazova	(Hungary) 2019 Győr	Girls' uneven bars
Silver	Viktoria Listunova	(Hungary) 2019 Győr	Girls' uneven bars
Gold	Elena Gerasimova	(Hungary) 2019 Győr	Girls' balance beam
Gold	Viktoria Listunova	(Hungary) 2019 Győr	Girls' floor exercise
Bronze	Elena Gerasimova	(Hungary) 2019 Győr	Girls' floor exercise
Silver	Ivan Gerget	(Hungary) 2019 Győr	Boys' horizontal bar
Gold	Arsenii Dukhno	(Philippines) 2025 Manila	Boys' all-around
Gold	Milana Kaiumova	(Philippines) 2025 Manila	Girls' uneven bars
Gold	Arsenii Dukhno	(Philippines) 2025 Manila	Boys' vault

== See also ==
- Russia men's national artistic gymnastics team
- Russia women's national artistic gymnastics team
- List of Olympic male artistic gymnasts for Russia
- List of Olympic female artistic gymnasts for Russia
