= 1996 European Men's Artistic Gymnastics Championships =

22nd European Men's Artistic Gymnastics Championships
- Location: Brøndby, Copenhagen, Denmark
- Start date: 9 May 1996
- End date: 12 May 1996

The 22nd European Men's Artistic Gymnastics Championships was held in Brøndby, Copenhagen, Denmark from 9–12 May 1996.

== Medalists ==
Event	Gold	Silver	Bronze
Team	Russia (RUS); Aleksey Voropayev; Yevgeny Podgorny; Sergey Kharkov; Dimitri Karbanenko; Dmitry Trush	Ukraine (UKR); Hryhoriy Misiutin; Rustam Sharipov; Oleksandr Svitlychnyi; Oleh Kosiak; Yuriy Yermakov	Belarus (BLR); Ivan Ivankov; Vitaly Scherbo; Andrei Kan; Vitaly Rudnitsky; Aleksandr Shostak
All-around	(Belarus) Ivan Ivankov	(Belarus) Vitaly Scherbo	(Russia) Aleksey Voropayev
Floor	(Belarus) Vitaly Scherbo	(Russia) Yevgeny Podgorny	(Ukraine) Hryhoriy Misiutin
Pommel horse	(Switzerland) Li Donghua	(Belarus) Ivan Ivankov	(France) Patrice Casimir
Rings	(Italy) Jury Chechi	(Germany) Marius Tobă (Bulgaria) Yordan Yovchev	Not awarded
Vault	(Belarus) Vitaly Scherbo	(Switzerland) Dieter Rehm	(Romania) Cristian Leric
Parallel bars	(Belarus) Vitaly Scherbo (Ukraine) Rustam Sharipov	Not awarded	(Belarus) Ivan Ivankov
Horizontal bar	(Bulgaria) Krasimir Dunev (Russia) Aleksey Voropayev	Not awarded	(Belarus) Vitaly Scherbo (Ukraine) Oleksandr Svitlychnyi

=== Medal table ===
Rank	Nation	Gold	Silver	Bronze	Total
1	Belarus (BLR)	4	2	3	9
2	Russia (RUS)	2	1	1	4
3	Ukraine (UKR)	1	1	2	4
4	Bulgaria (BUL)	1	1	0	2
4	Switzerland (SUI)	1	1	0	2
6	Italy (ITA)	1	0	0	1
7	Germany (GER)	0	1	0	1
8	France (FRA)	0	0	1	1
8	Romania (ROU)	0	0	1	1
Totals (9 entries)		10	7	8	25

== Results ==
=== All-around ===
Rank	Athlete	Nation	Apparatus						Total
Rank	Athlete	Nation	F	PH	R	V	PB	HB	Total
1st place, gold medalist(s)	Ivan Ivankov	Belarus (BLR)	9.637	9.737	9.675	9.650	9.687	9.512	57.898
2nd place, silver medalist(s)	Vitaly Scherbo	Belarus (BLR)	9.725	9.600	9.475	9.687	9.725	9.662	57.874
3rd place, bronze medalist(s)	Alexei Voropaev	Russia (RUS)	9.525	9.300	9.662	9.762	9.537	9.750	57.536
4	Jordan Jovtchev	Bulgaria (BUL)	9.562	9.550	9.737	9.475	9.550	9.325	57.199
5	Jury Chechi	Italy (ITA)	9.300	9.475	9.762	9.150	9.600	9.475	56.762
6	Zoltán Supola	Hungary (HUN)	9.425	9.675	9.325	9.575	9.500	9.100	56.600
7	Patrice Casimir	France (FRA)	9.175	9.700	9.437	9.400	9.350	9.462	56.524
8	Oleksandr Svitlychnyi	Ukraine (UKR)	9.250	9.125	9.437	9.487	9.450	9.625	56.374
9	Aleksej Demjanov	Croatia (CRO)	9.225	9.075	9.637	9.300	9.637	9.400	56.274
10	Dmitri Karbanenko	Russia (RUS)	9.575	9.700	9.125	9.225	9.150	9.375	56.150
11	Cristian Leric	Romania (ROM)	8.575	9.525	9.325	9.587	9.550	9.275	55.837
12	Ilia Giorgadze	Georgia (GEO)	9.075	9.250	9.000	9.075	9.400	9.425	55.225
13	Jurgen van Eetvelt	Belgium (BEL)	9.150	8.900	9.300	9.050	9.175	9.250	54.825
14	Jiri Firt	Czech Republic (CZE)	9.000	9.200	9.125	9.175	8.725	9.425	54.650
15	Lee McDermott	Great Britain (GBR)	9.150	8.550	9.375	9.175	9.100	9.300	54.650
16	Ayalon Yuval	Israel (ISR)	9.125	8.900	9.175	9.150	9.050	9.150	54.550
17	Rasmus Brandtoft	Denmark (DEN)	8.950	8.800	9.225	9.475	8.600	9.375	54.425
18	Thomas Zimmermann	Austria (AUT)	8.900	8.750	8.975	9.200	9.200	9.125	54.150
19	Flemming Solberg	Norway (NOR)	8.975	9.300	8.550	9.025	8.975	9.275	54.100
20	Magnus Rosengren	Sweden (SWE)	9.225	8.325	9.200	9.550	8.575	9.225	54.100
21	Espen Jansen	Norway (NOR)	9.050	8.675	9.250	9.100	8.775	9.075	53.925
22	Dominic Brindle	Great Britain (GBR)	9.150	–	–	9.100	9.175	8.075	DNF
23	Michael Engeler	Switzerland (SUI)	8.975	8.550	8.875	–	–	8.800	DNF
24	Valeri Belenki	Germany (GER)	–	–	–	–	8.950	8.850	DNF

=== Floor exercise ===
Rank	Gymnast	Total
1st place, gold medalist(s)	Vitaly Scherbo (BLR)	9.800
2nd place, silver medalist(s)	Yevgeny Podgorny (RUS)	9.725
3rd place, bronze medalist(s)	Hryhoriy Misiutin (UKR)	9.687
4	Thiérry Aymes (FRA)	9.650
5	Vitaly Rudnitsky (BLR)	9.625
6	Aleksey Voropayev (RUS)	9.612
7	Oleksandr Svitlychnyi (UKR)	9.275
8	Magnus Rosengren (SWE)	9.000

=== Pommel horse ===
Rank	Gymnast	Total
1st place, gold medalist(s)	Li Donghua (SUI)	9.812
2nd place, silver medalist(s)	Ivan Ivankov (BLR)	9.750
3rd place, bronze medalist(s)	Patrice Casimir (FRA)	9.712
4	Éric Poujade (FRA)	9.700
4	Andrei Kan (BLR)	9.700
6	Zoltán Supola (HUN)	9.687
7	Kalofer Khristozov (BUL)	9.575
8	Dimitri Karbanenko (RUS)	9.075

=== Rings ===
Rank	Gymnast	Total
1st place, gold medalist(s)	Jury Chechi (ITA)	9.837
2nd place, silver medalist(s)	Jordan Jovtchev (BUL)	9.750
3rd place, bronze medalist(s)	Marius Tobă (GER)	9.750
4	Ivan Ivankov (BLR)	9.737
5	Nistor Șandro (ROM)	9.600
5	Valeri Belenki (GER)	9.600
7	Aleksey Voropayev (RUS)	9.575
8	Oleksandr Svitlychnyi (UKR)	9.475

=== Vault ===
Rank	Gymnast	Total
1st place, gold medalist(s)	Vitaly Scherbo (BLR)	9.643
2nd place, silver medalist(s)	Dieter Rehm (SUI)	9.556
3rd place, bronze medalist(s)	Cristian Leric (ROM)	9.512
4	Aleksey Voropayev (RUS)	9.437
5	Samuel Dumont (FRA)	9.437
6	Magnus Rosengren (SWE)	9.406
7	Zoltán Supola (HUN)	9.400
8	Dimitri Karbanenko (RUS)	9.162

=== Parallel bars ===
Rank	Gymnast	Total
1st place, gold medalist(s)	Vitaly Scherbo (BLR)	9.725
1st place, gold medalist(s)	Rustam Sharipov (UKR)	9.725
3rd place, bronze medalist(s)	Ivan Ivankov (BLR)	9.712
4	Valeri Belenki (GER)	9.650
5	Ivan Ivanov (BUL)	9.575
6	Nistor Șandro (ROM)	9.550
7	Jury Chechi (ITA)	9.487
8	Aleksej Demjanov (CRO)	9.476

=== Horizontal bar ===
Rank	Gymnast	Total
1st place, gold medalist(s)	Krasimir Dunev (BUL)	9.762
1st place, gold medalist(s)	Aleksey Voropayev (RUS)	9.762
3rd place, bronze medalist(s)	Vitaly Scherbo (BLR)	9.725
3rd place, bronze medalist(s)	Oleksandr Svitlychnyi (UKR)	9.725
5	Omar Cortés (ESP)	9.675
5	Sergey Kharkov (RUS)	9.675
7	Zoltán Supola (ROM)	9.650
8	Boris Preti (ITA)	9.612

== Junior medalists ==
Event	Gold	Silver	Bronze
Team	Russia	Belarus	France
All-around	(Russia) Oleg Kuzmin	(Russia) Nikolai Kryukov	(Ukraine) Ruslan Mezentsev
Floor	(Russia) Oleg Kuzmin	(Russia) Georgy Grebenkov	(Ukraine) Roman Zozulya
Pommel horse	(Russia) Nikolai Kryukov	(Romania) Adrian Rădoi	(Hungary) Irme Pintye
Rings	(Russia) Oleg Kuzmin	(Belarus) Vadim Kisselev	(Ukraine) E. Kuzmin
Vault	(Sweden) Michael Hjorth	(Denmark) Jeppe Villekjaer	(France) Johan Mounard
Parallel bars	(Ukraine) Ruslan Mezentsev	(Russia) Oleg Kuzmin (Russia) Nikolai Kryukov	Not awarded
Horizontal bar	(Russia) Oleg Kuzmin	(Russia) Andrey Golikov	(France) Yann Cucherat (Spain) Andreu Vivó
