= 1994 World Artistic Gymnastics Team Championships =

Sport competition

1994 World Artistic Gymnastics Championships (Team)
- Location: Dortmund, Germany
- Start date: November 15, 1994
- End date: November 20, 1994

The 1994 World Artistic Gymnastics Team Championships were held in Dortmund, Germany, from 15 to 20 November 1994.

Only the team event was contested at this meet. The individual events and all-around were contested at another World Championships in Brisbane, Australia in April 1994. This was the only year in which the World Championships were split into two separate competitions.

== Participants ==
=== Women ===
Country	Gymnast
Belarus	Aleksandra Kulbitskaya
Belarus	Elena Piskun
Belarus	Alena Polozkova
Belarus	Svetlana Tarasevich
Belarus	Lyudmila Vityukova
Belarus	Olga Yurkina
Belarus	Yulia Yurkina
Bulgaria	Iliana Halacheva
Bulgaria	Snezhana Hristakieva
Bulgaria	Svetlana Ivanova
Bulgaria	Hristina Kuntcheva
Bulgaria	Galina Lazarova
Bulgaria	Iglika Panayotova
Bulgaria	Mirela Peneva
Canada	Marilou Cousineau
Canada	Lena Degteva
Canada	Jennifer Exaltacion
Canada	Jaime Hill
Canada	Eve-Marie Poulin
Canada	Lisa Simes
Canada	Theresa Wolf
China	Guang Yuging
China	He Xuemei
China	Liu Xuan
China	Mo Huilan
China	Qiao Ya
China	Ye Linlin
China	Yuan Kexia
Cuba	Yureysis Bermudez
Cuba	Mayludis Bombino
Cuba	Lisandra Cardeso
Cuba	Leyanet González
Cuba	Arazay Jova
Cuba	Annia Portuondo
France	Cécile Canqueteau
France	Anne Etienne
France	Laure Gély
France	Élodie Lussac
France	Christelle Marconnet
France	Frédérique Marotte
France	Carine Muntoni
Germany	Cindy Klemrath
Germany	Rufina Kreibich
Germany	Wiebke Preiss
Germany	Angelika Schatton
Germany	Diana Schröder
Germany	Julia Stratmann
Germany	Yvonne Wörner
Hungary	Ildikó Balog
Hungary	Ildikó Dragoner
Hungary	Erika Gibala
Hungary	Rita Jokuthy
Hungary	Andrea Molnár
Hungary	Adrienn Nyeste
Hungary	Eszter Óváry
Japan	Yuka Arai
Japan	Mari Kosuge
Japan	Hanako Miura
Japan	Satsuki Obata
Japan	Masumi Okawa
Japan	Aya Sekine
Japan	Risa Sugawara
Romania	Simona Amânar
Romania	Gina Gogean
Romania	Nadia Hațegan
Romania	Ionela Loaieș
Romania	Daniela Mărănducă
Romania	Lavinia Miloșovici
Romania	Claudia Presăcan
Russia	Oksana Fabrichnova
Russia	Elena Grosheva
Russia	Natalia Ivanova
Russia	Svetlana Khorkina
Russia	Dina Kochetkova
Russia	Elena Lebedeva
Russia	Evgenia Roschina
South Africa	Louise Fox
South Africa	Leanda James
South Africa	Heidi Oosthuizen
South Africa	Ilse Roets
South Africa	Tanya Steenkamp
South Africa	Joanne West
Spain	Verónica Castro
Spain	Sonia Fraguas
Spain	Mónica Martín
Spain	Mercedes Pacheco
Spain	Ana Pérez
Spain	Ruth Rollán
Spain	Elisabeth Valle
Ukraine	Irina Bulakhova
Ukraine	Oksana Knizhnik
Ukraine	Tatiana Malaya
Ukraine	Natalia Panteleyeva
Ukraine	Lilia Podkopayeva
Ukraine	Olena Shaparna
Ukraine	Olesya Shulga
United Kingdom	Anna-Liese Acklam
United Kingdom	Gemma Cuff
United Kingdom	Gabriela Fuchs
United Kingdom	Andrea Leman
United Kingdom	Zita Lusack
United Kingdom	Annika Reeder
United Kingdom	Karin Szymko
United States	Amanda Borden
United States	Amy Chow
United States	Dominique Dawes
United States	Larissa Fontaine
United States	Shannon Miller
United States	Jaycie Phelps
United States	Kerri Strug

== Medalists ==
Event	Gold	Silver	Bronze
Men
Team all-around	China; Fan Hongbin; Guo Linyao; Huang Huadong; Huang Liping; Li Dashuang; Li Xiaoshuang; Li Jing	Russia; Dimitri Karbanenko; Alexei Nemov; Yevgeny Shabayev; Dmitri Trush; Dmitri Vasilenko; Aleksey Voropayev; Yevgeny Zhukov	Ukraine; Ihor Korobchynskyi; Vitaly Marinich; Hrihoriy Misyutin; Volodymyr Shamenko; Rustam Sharipov; Andriy Stepanchenko; Yuriy Yermakov
Women
Team all-around	Romania; Simona Amânar; Gina Gogean; Nadia Hațegan; Ionela Loaieș; Daniela Mărănducă; Lavinia Miloșovici; Claudia Presăcan	United States; Amanda Borden; Amy Chow; Dominique Dawes; Larissa Fontaine; Shannon Miller; Jaycie Phelps; Kerri Strug	Russia; Oksana Fabrichnova; Elena Grosheva; Natalia Ivanova; Svetlana Khorkina; Dina Kochetkova; Elena Lebedeva; Evgenia Roschina

== Men's results ==
Rank	Team	Floor (gymnastics)	Pommel horse	Rings (gymnastics)	Vault (gymnastics)	Parallel bars	Horizontal bar	Total
1st place, gold medalist(s)	China	46.837 (3)	48.149 (1)	46.537 (5)	47.598 (2)	47.100 (1)	47.112 (2)	283.333
1st place, gold medalist(s)	Li Xiaoshuang	9.250	9.575	9.487	9.662	9.375	9.512	283.333
1st place, gold medalist(s)	Li Dashuang	9.562	9.250	9.200	9.562	-	9.225	283.333
1st place, gold medalist(s)	Huang Liping	9.200	9.400	9.025	9.537	9.675	9.650	283.333
1st place, gold medalist(s)	Huang Huadong	9.375	9.837	9.125	9.275	9.375	9.375	283.333
1st place, gold medalist(s)	Li Jing	9.225	9.562	9.375	-	9.475	9.025	283.333
1st place, gold medalist(s)	Guo Linyao	-	9.775	-	9.250	9.025	9.350	283.333
1st place, gold medalist(s)	Fan Hongbin	9.425	-	9.350	9.562	9.200	-	283.333
2nd place, silver medalist(s)	Russia	47.250 (2)	46.925 (3)	46.849 (3)	48.136 (1)	45.812 (6)	47.186 (1)	282.158
2nd place, silver medalist(s)	Dimitri Karbanenko	9.175	9.400	-	9.637	8.775	9.400	282.158
2nd place, silver medalist(s)	Alexei Nemov	9.675	9.425	-	9.550	9.050	9.737	282.158
2nd place, silver medalist(s)	Yevgeny Zhukov	9.175	9.150	9.225	9.487	-	9.462	282.158
2nd place, silver medalist(s)	Dmitri Vasilenko	9.425	-	9.437	9.650	8.825	-	282.158
2nd place, silver medalist(s)	Dmitri Trush	-	9.325	9.375	-	9.025	8.900	282.158
2nd place, silver medalist(s)	Aleksey Voropayev	9.525	9.350	9.587	9.712	9.425	5.575	282.158
2nd place, silver medalist(s)	Yevgeny Shabayev	9.450	9.425	9.225	9.587	9.487	9.687	282.158
3rd place, bronze medalist(s)	Ukraine	47.462 (1)	47.012 (5)	47.050 (2)	46.812 (4)	46.625 (2)	46.125 (6)	281.086
3rd place, bronze medalist(s)	Ihor Korobchynskyi	9.587	9.200	9.225	9.500	9.575	9.600	281.086
3rd place, bronze medalist(s)	Vitaly Marinich	-	9.650	9.650	-	9.275	8.900	281.086
3rd place, bronze medalist(s)	Hrihoriy Misyutin	9.575	9.587	9.475	9.737	9.225	-	281.086
3rd place, bronze medalist(s)	Rustam Sharipov	9.450	9.350	9.425	9.125	9.475	9.175	281.086
3rd place, bronze medalist(s)	Volodymyr Shamenko	9.425	-	9.175	9.225	9.075	9.250	281.086
3rd place, bronze medalist(s)	Yuriy Yermakov	9.425	9.225	9.275	9.225	-	8.200	281.086
3rd place, bronze medalist(s)	Andriy Stepanchenko	8.950	9.000	-	8.950	8.850	9.200	281.086
4	Belarus	46.537 (4)	47.275 (2)	46.712 (4)	47.187 (3)	46.612 (3)	46.650 (5)	280.973
4	Vitaly Scherbo	9.525	9.375	9.275	9.675	9.400	9.625	280.973
4	Ivan Ivankov	9.662	9.525	9.487	9.587	9.512	9.375	280.973
4	Aleksandr Shostak	-	9.575	9.075	-	9.300	9.300	280.973
4	Andrey Kan	9.350	9.450	9.250	9.350	9.300	9.275	280.973
4	Vitaly Rudnitsky	9.350	9.175	9.375	9.275	9.100	8.100	280.973
4	Ivan Pavlovsky	8.650	-	-	9.300	-	9.075	280.973
4	Aleksandr Belanovsky	-	9.350	9.325	-	8.425	-	280.973
5	Germany	46.537 (4)	45.700 (6)	47.975 (1)	46.475 (6)	46.425 (5)	47.049 (3)	280.161
5	Valery Belenky	9.575	9.400	9.600	9.325	9.550	9.400	280.161
5	Uwe Billerbeck	9.000	-	9.450	9.375	9.150	-	280.161
5	Jan-Peter Nikiferow	-	9.050	-	9.150	-	9.612	280.161
5	Marius Tobă	9.300	9.150	9.600	-	9.275	7.825	280.161
5	Oliver Walther	8.350	9.250	9.375	9.300	9.250	9.537	280.161
5	Andreas Wecker	9.587	8.800	9.725	9.300	8.850	9.325	280.161
5	Mario Franke	9.075	8.850	9.600	9.175	9.200	9.175	280.161
6	Japan	45.825 (6)	46.800 (4)	46.325 (6)	46.612 (5)	46.462 (4)	46.675 (4)	278.699
6	Hikaru Tanaka	9.250	9.275	9.450	9.250	9.562	9.375	278.699
6	Daisuke Nishikawa	9.250	9.275	-	9.225	9.275	9.250	278.699
6	Masayuki Matsunaga	9.00	8.225	9.325	-	9.325	9.350	278.699
6	Toshiharu Sato	9.200	9.375	9.175	9.487	8.375	9.325	278.699
6	Takehiko Ono	9.050	-	9.350	9.250	-	-	278.699
6	Yoshiaki Hatakeda	9.075	9.525	9.025	9.350	9.150	9.375	278.699
6	Masayoshi Maeda	-	9.350	8.575	9.275	9.150	9.200	278.699

== Women's results ==
Rank	Team	Vault (gymnastics)	Uneven bars	Balance beam	Floor (gymnastics)	Total
1st place, gold medalist(s)	Romania	49.050 (1)	48.374 (4)	49.049 (1)	49.374 (1)	195.847
1st place, gold medalist(s)	Lavinia Miloșovici	9.825	9.825	9.900	9.950	195.847
1st place, gold medalist(s)	Gina Gogean	9.850	9.650	9.850	9.900	195.847
1st place, gold medalist(s)	Simona Amânar	9.850	9.675	9.762	9.875	195.847
1st place, gold medalist(s)	Daniela Mărănducă	9.800	9.562	9.675	9.837	195.847
1st place, gold medalist(s)	Claudia Presăcan	9.637		9.800	9.812	195.847
1st place, gold medalist(s)	Nadia Hațegan	9.725	9.400	9.737		195.847
1st place, gold medalist(s)	Ionela Loaieș		9.662		9.762	195.847
2nd place, silver medalist(s)	United States	48.861 (2)	48.512 (3)	48.461 (3)	48.811 (3)	194.645
2nd place, silver medalist(s)	Dominique Dawes	9.887	9.825	9.837	9.850	194.645
2nd place, silver medalist(s)	Kerri Strug	9.812	9.675	9.700	9.825	194.645
2nd place, silver medalist(s)	Amanda Borden	9.587	9.725	9.625	9.812	194.645
2nd place, silver medalist(s)	Jaycie Phelps	9.650	9.625	9.587	9.637	194.645
2nd place, silver medalist(s)	Amy Chow	9.687	9.375	9.712	9.687	194.645
2nd place, silver medalist(s)	Larissa Fontaine	9.825	9.662	9.300	9.625	194.645
2nd place, silver medalist(s)	Shannon Miller					194.645
3rd place, bronze medalist(s)	Russia	48.674 (3)	48.925 (1)	48.561 (2)	48.386 (4)	194.546
3rd place, bronze medalist(s)	Svetlana Khorkina	9.875	9.875	9.875	9.825	194.546
3rd place, bronze medalist(s)	Dina Kochetkova	9.725	9.825	9.812	9.737	194.546
3rd place, bronze medalist(s)	Elena Lebedeva	9.762	9.725	9.775	9.525	194.546
3rd place, bronze medalist(s)	Oksana Fabrichnova	9.212	9.775	9.762	9.662	194.546
3rd place, bronze medalist(s)	Elena Grosheva	9.650	9.725	9.337	9.637	194.546
3rd place, bronze medalist(s)	Evgenia Roschina	9.662	9.012	8.737	9.525	194.546
3rd place, bronze medalist(s)	Natalia Ivanova					194.546
4	China	48.261 (4)	48.924 (2)	48.099 (4)	48.848 (2)	194.132
4	Mo Huilan	9.750	9.900	9.662	9.900	194.132
4	Yuan Kexia	9.612	9.712	9.700	9.787	194.132
4	Liu Xuan		9.837	9.700	9.712	194.132
4	He Xuemei	9.612	9.725	9.387		194.132
4	Guang Yuging	9.537	9.750		9.712	194.132
4	Ye Linlin	9.737		9.650	9.687	194.132
4	Qiao Ya	9.550	9.612	9.212	9.737	194.132
5	Ukraine	47.974 (5)	48.087 (5)	47.899 (5)	47.774 (6)	191.734
5	Irina Bulakhova	9.537	9.700	9.675	9.675	191.734
5	Lilia Podkopayeva	9.750	9.387	9.825	9.137	191.734
5	Olena Shaparna	9.525	9.587	9.150	9.712	191.734
5	Natalia Panteleyeva	9.525	9.600	9.587		191.734
5	Oksana Knizhnik	9.637		9.250	9.625	191.734
5	Tatiana Malaya	9.475	9.650	9.562	9.000	191.734
5	Olesya Shulga		9.550		9.625	191.734
6	Belarus	47.561 (6)	47.212 (6)	46.286 (6)	47.962 (5)	189.021
6	Elena Piskun	9.787	9.825	9.200	9.850	189.021
6	Svetlana Tarasevich	9.262	9.637	9.587	9.662	189.021
6	Olga Yurkina	9.387	9.525	9.137	9.600	189.021
6	Alena Polozkova	9.525	9.325	9.012	9.225	189.021
6	Lyudmila Vityukova	9.425		8.675	9.625	189.021
6	Yulia Yurkina		8.900	9.350		189.021
6	Aleksandra Kulbitskaya		8.062		8.650	189.021
