= Yevgeny Shabayev =

Russian artistic gymnast

Personal information
- Alternative names: Yevgeni, Evgeny, Evgeni, Chabaev
- Born: 24 April 1973 Moscow, Russian SSR, Soviet Union
- Died: 5 August 1998 (aged 25) Moscow, Russia

Gymnastics career
- Discipline: Men's artistic gymnastics
- Country represented: Russia; (1994—1997)
- Club: Moscow Dynamo
- Head coach: Nikolay Maslennikov
Medal record
Men's artistic gymnastics
Representing Russia
World Championships
Silver medal – second place	1994 Dortmund	Team
Bronze medal – third place	1995 Sabae	All-around
Goodwill Games
Gold medal – first place	1994 Saint Petersburg	Team
Gold medal – first place	1994 Saint Petersburg	Parallel bars
Silver medal – second place	1994 Saint Petersburg	Vault
Bronze medal – third place	1994 Saint Petersburg	All-around
Bronze medal – third place	1994 Saint Petersburg	Mixed team
Universiade
Gold medal – first place	1995 Fukuoka	All-around
Gold medal – first place	1995 Fukuoka	Floor exercise
Bronze medal – third place	1995 Fukuoka	Team

Yevgeny Yevgenyevich Shabayev (Russian: Евгений Евгеньевич Шабаев; 24 April 1973 – 5 August 1998) was a Russian artistic gymnast. He won a silver with his team at the 1994 Team World Championships, and he was the bronze medalist in the all-around at the 1995 World Championships. He was also the 1995 Summer Universiade all-around and floor exercise champion and the 1994 Goodwill Games team and parallel bars champion. Due to injuries, he stopped competing in major international events after the 1995 World Championships but continued to train until his death in 1998.

== Gymnastics career ==
Shabayev competed at the 1994 Goodwill Games in Saint Petersburg alongside Dmitri Vasilenko, Alexei Nemov, and Aleksey Voropayev, and they won the gold medal in the team competition. Individually, he won the all-around bronze medal, behind Nemov and Voropayev. In the event finals, he won the gold medal on the parallel bars and the silver medal on the vault. He won an additional bronze medal in the mixed team event with Voropayev, Elena Grosheva, and Oksana Chusovitina. In 1994, the International Gymnastics Federation hosted two separate World Championships for the individual and team competitions. At the individual World Championships, he placed fifth in the all-around final— less than one tenth of a point away from the bronze medal. Then, in the parallel bars final, he finished in fourth place and was 0.025 points away from the bronze medal. He then helped Russia win the silver medal at the team World Championships.

Shabayev won the all-around title at the 1995 Summer Universiade and also won gold on the floor exercise. He also won the all-around competition at the 1995 European Cup. He competed with the Russian team that placed fourth at the 1995 World Championships. He advanced to the individual all-around final and won the bronze medal behind Li Xiaoshuang and Vitaly Scherbo.

Shabayev had shoulder surgery in 1996 and was named the alternate for Russia's 1996 Olympic team. He returned to competition in December 1996 and won the all-around title at the Chunichi Cup. He missed the 1997 Russian Championships due to another injury and was left off the 1997 World Championships team. Despite the injuries, Shabayev continued training until his death.

== Death ==
Shabayev died of a heart attack on 5 August 1998, at the age of 25, in Moscow. His funeral was held six days later, and fellow gymnasts Alexei Nemov, Nikolai Kryukov, Elena Grosheva and Roza Galieva were in attendance. He is buried at the Pokrovskoe Cemetery.
