= 1994 European Men's Artistic Gymnastics Championships =

21st European Men's Artistic Gymnastics Championships
- Location: Prague, Czech Republic
- Start date: 2 June 1994
- End date: 5 June 1994

The 21st European Men's Artistic Gymnastics Championships was held in Prague, Czech Republic from 2–5 June 1994.

== Medalists ==
Event	Gold	Silver	Bronze
Team	Belarus (BLR); Ivan Ivankov; Andrei Kan; Aleksandr Shostak; Vitaly Scherbo; Vitaly Rudnitsky	Russia (RUS); Dmitri Vasilenko; Yevgeny Shabayev; Alexei Nemov; Dmitri Trush	Germany (GER); Valeri Belenki; Andreas Wecker; Marius Tobă; Ralf Büchner; Maik Krahberg
All-around	(Belarus) Ivan Ivankov	(Ukraine) Igor Korobchinsky	(Russia) Yevgeny Shabayev
Floor	(Bulgaria) Ivan Ivanov	(Belarus) Ivan Ivankov (Russia) Dmitri Vasilenko	Not awarded
Pommel horse	(Romania) Marius Urzică	(France) Éric Poujade	(Ukraine) Vitaly Marinich
Rings	(Italy) Jury Chechi	(Germany) Andreas Wecker	(Hungary) Szilveszter Csollány
Vault	(Belarus) Vitaly Scherbo	(Romania) Cristian Leric	(Sweden) Magnus Rosengren
Parallel bars	(Russia) Alexei Nemov (Ukraine) Rustam Sharipov	Not awarded	(Russia) Yevgeny Shabayev (Ukraine) Igor Korobchinsky
Horizontal bar	(Slovenia) Aljaž Pegan	(Belarus) Vitaly Scherbo	(Russia) Yevgeny Shabayev

=== Medal table ===
Rank	Nation	Gold	Silver	Bronze	Total
1	Belarus (BLR)	3	2	0	5
2	Russia (RUS)	1	2	3	6
3	Ukraine (UKR)	1	1	2	4
4	Romania (ROU)	1	1	0	2
5	Bulgaria (BUL)	1	0	0	1
5	Italy (ITA)	1	0	0	1
5	Slovenia (SLO)	1	0	0	1
8	Germany (GER)	0	1	1	2
9	France (FRA)	0	1	0	1
10	Hungary (HUN)	0	0	1	1
10	Sweden (SWE)	0	0	1	1
Totals (11 entries)		9	8	8	25

== Results ==
=== All-around ===
Rank	Athlete	Nation	Apparatus						Total
Rank	Athlete	Nation	F	PH	R	V	PB	HB	Total
1st place, gold medalist(s)	Ivan Ivankov	Belarus (BLR)	9.625	9.525	9.612	9.550	9.637	9.600	57.549
2nd place, silver medalist(s)	Igor Korobchinsky	Ukraine (UKR)	9.662	9.475	9.250	9.450	9.612	9.350	56.799
3rd place, bronze medalist(s)	Yevgeny Shabayev	Russia (RUS)	9.482	9.375	9.350	9.400	9.587	9.575	56.749
4	Alexei Nemov	Russia (RUS)	9.275	9.500	9.250	9.487	9.637	9.475	56.624
5	Valery Belenky	Germany (GER)	9.225	9.525	9.500	9.512	9.450	9.200	56.412
6	Juri Chechi	Italy (ITA)	9.300	9.200	9.675	9.225	9.375	9.375	56.150
7	Ivan Ivanov	Bulgaria (BUL)	9.675	8.875	9.275	9.487	9.500	9.150	55.962
8	Zoltán Supola	Hungary (HUN)	8.525	9.475	9.225	9.575	9.450	9.525	55.775
9	Jordan Jovtchev	Bulgaria (BUL)	9.350	8.975	9.500	9.275	9.200	9.425	55.725
10	Éric Poujade	France (FRA)	9.025	9.675	8.975	9.325	9.275	9.425	55.700
11	Andrei Kan	Belarus (BLR)	9.175	9.100	9.050	9.350	9.500	9.150	55.325
12	Miroslav Smetana	Czech Republic (CZE)	9.050	8.675	9.525	9.300	9.275	9.125	54.950
13	Li Donghua	Switzerland (SUI)	8.900	9.525	9.025	8.950	8.950	9.250	54.600
14	Alexandru Ciuca	Romania (ROM)	8.925	8.850	9.175	9.487	8.950	9.125	54.512
15	Tomáš Tvrdý	Czech Republic (CZE)	8.675	9.025	9.050	9.175	9.100	9.425	54.450
16	Csaba Fajkusz	Hungary (HUN)	9.100	9.350	9.150	9.225	8.075	9.375	54.275
17	Norair Sarkisian	Armenia (ARM)	8.950	8.900	9.350	9.200	9.025	8.650	54.075
18	Christian Selk	Netherlands (NED)	9.150	8.500	8.825	9.050	9.000	9.150	53.675
19	Danny Akerman	Israel (ISR)	8.775	8.625	8.925	9.175	8.975	8.925	53.400
20	Catalin Mircan	Austria (AUT)	8.725	9.325	8.775	9.200	9.075	8.275	53.375
21	Magnus Rosengren	Sweden (SWE)	9.100	7.825	9.075	9.475	8.700	9.175	53.350
22	Alexander Selk	Netherlands (NED)	8.700	8.550	8.725	9.050	8.800	9.275	53.100
23	Miguel García	Spain (ESP)	8.475	8.350	8.875	9.150	8.925	8.825	52.600
24	Ruggero Rossato	Italy (ITA)	9.025	8.100	9.350	0.000	9.275	9.075	44.825

=== Floor exercise ===
Rank	Gymnast	Total
1st place, gold medalist(s)	Ivan Ivanov (BUL)	9.687
2nd place, silver medalist(s)	Ivan Ivankov (BLR)	9.612
2nd place, silver medalist(s)	Dmitri Vasilenko (RUS)	9.612
4	Thiérry Aymes (FRA)	9.525
5	Yordan Yovchev (BUL)	9.475
6	Igor Korobchinsky (UKR)	9.437
7	Volodymyr Shamenko (UKR)	9.050
7	Yevgeny Shabayev (RUS)	9.050

=== Pommel horse ===
Rank	Gymnast	Total
1st place, gold medalist(s)	Marius Urzică (ROM)	9.787
2nd place, silver medalist(s)	Éric Poujade (FRA)	9.762
3rd place, bronze medalist(s)	Vitaly Marinich (UKR)	9.700
4	Aleksandr Shostak (BLR)	9.687
4	Ivan Ivankov (BLR)	9.687
6	Patrice Casimir (FRA)	9.250
7	Yevgeny Shabayev (RUS)	9.200
8	Zoltán Supola (HUN)	8.950

=== Rings ===
Rank	Gymnast	Total
1st place, gold medalist(s)	Jury Chechi (ITA)	9.787
2nd place, silver medalist(s)	Andreas Wecker (GER)	9.725
3rd place, bronze medalist(s)	Szilveszter Csollány (HUN)	9.712
4	Rustam Sharipov (UKR)	9.675
5	Ivan Ivankov (BLR)	9.662
6	Miroslav Smetana (CZE)	9.650
7	Vitaly Marinich (UKR)	9.562
8	Dan Burincă (ROM)	9.525

=== Vault ===
Rank	Gymnast	Total
1st place, gold medalist(s)	Vitaly Scherbo (BLR)	9.662
2nd place, silver medalist(s)	Cristian Leric (ROM)	9.518
3rd place, bronze medalist(s)	Magnus Rosengren (SWE)	9.512
4	Ralf Büchner (GER)	9.456
5	Zoltán Supola (HUN)	9.431
6	Yevgeny Shabayev (RUS)	9.425
7	Valery Belenky (GER)	9.375
8	Ivan Ivanov (BUL)	9.312

=== Parallel bars ===
Rank	Gymnast	Total
1st place, gold medalist(s)	Alexei Nemov (RUS)	9.725
1st place, gold medalist(s)	Rustam Sharipov (UKR)	9.725
3rd place, bronze medalist(s)	Yevgeny Shabayev (RUS)	9.600
3rd place, bronze medalist(s)	Igor Korobchinsky (UKR)	9.600
5	Valery Belenky (GER)	9.500
6	Ivan Ivankov (BLR)	9.450
7	Andreas Wecker (GER)	9.425
8	Ivan Ivanov (BUL)	9.275

=== Horizontal bar ===
Rank	Gymnast	Total
1st place, gold medalist(s)	Aljaž Pegan (SLO)	9.762
2nd place, silver medalist(s)	Vitaly Scherbo (BLR)	9.662
3rd place, bronze medalist(s)	Yevgeny Shabayev (RUS)	9.600
4	Zoltán Supola (HUN)	9.550
4	Martin Banzer (SUI)	9.550
6	Alexei Nemov (RUS)	9.125
7	Csaba Fajkusz (HUN)	8.925
8	Ivan Ivankov (BLR)	8.850

== Junior medalists ==
Event	Gold	Silver	Bronze
All-around	(Russia) Evgeny Yukov	(Germany) Sergej Pfeifer	(Belarus) Vladimir Shkuratovich
Floor	(Greece) Ioannis Melissanidis	(Latvia) Igors Vihrovs	(Germany) Sergej Pfeifer
Pommel horse	(France) Éric Casimir	(Belarus) Vladimir Shkuratovich	(Spain) Jesús Carballo
Rings	(Italy) Matteo Ferretti	(Germany) Sergej Pfeifer	(Russia) Evgeny Yukov
Vault	(Romania) Florentin Pescaru	(Romania) Vasile Cioana	(Hungary) Krisztián Jordanov
Parallel bars	(Belarus) Ivan Pavlovsky	(Ukraine) Evgeny Zerebcevski	(Germany) Sergej Pfeifer
Horizontal bar	(Romania) Vasile Cioana	(Russia) Evgeny Yukov	(France) Laurent Landi (Germany) Rene Tschernitschek
