= Maik Krahberg =

German artistic gymnast

- Born: 1971

Gymnastics career
- Discipline: Men's artistic gymnastics
- Country represented: Germany
- Club: SV Halle
Medal record
Men's artistic gymnastics
Representing Germany
World Championships
| Bronze medal – third place | 1992 Paris | Floor |
European Championships
| Bronze medal – third place | 1994 Prague | Team |

Maik Krahberg (born 1971) is a German artistic gymnast. He won the bronze medal on floor exercise at the 1992 World Artistic Gymnastics Championships in Paris, finishing behind Ihor Korobchynskyi and Vitaly Scherbo.
