= Hrihoriy Misyutin =

Ukrainian gymnast (born 1970)

Hryhoriy Misyutin
- Full name: Hryhoriy Anatoliyovych Misyutin
- Alternative name: Grigory Misutin
- Born: 29 December 1970 (age 55) Oleksandriia, Ukrainian SSR
- Height: 166 cm (5 ft 5 in)

Gymnastics career
- Discipline: Men's artistic gymnastics
- Country represented: Ukraine
- Former countries represented: Soviet Union
Medal record
Representing Soviet Union
World Championships
Gold medal – first place	1991 Indianapolis	Team
Gold medal – first place	1991 Indianapolis	All-around
Gold medal – first place	1991 Indianapolis	Rings
Representing Unified Team
Olympic Games
Gold medal – first place	1992 Barcelona	Team
Silver medal – second place	1992 Barcelona	All-around
Silver medal – second place	1992 Barcelona	Floor exercise
Silver medal – second place	1992 Barcelona	Vault
Silver medal – second place	1992 Barcelona	Horizontal bar
World Championships
Gold medal – first place	1992 Paris	Horizontal bar
Bronze medal – third place	1992 Paris	Rings
Representing Ukraine
Olympic Games
Bronze medal – third place	1996 Atlanta	Team
World Championships
Gold medal – first place	1993 Birmingham	Floor exercise
Gold medal – first place	1995 Sabae	Vault
Bronze medal – third place	1995 Sabae	Floor exercise
Bronze medal – third place	1996 San Juan	Floor exercise
European Championships
Silver medal – second place	1996 Brøndby	Team
Bronze medal – third place	1996 Brøndby	Floor exercise
Goodwill Games
Gold medal – first place	1994 Saint Petersburg	Floor exercise
Gold medal – first place	1994 Saint Petersburg	Pommel horse
Gold medal – first place	1994 Saint Petersburg	Vault

Hryhoriy Anatoliyovych Misyutin (Ukrainian: Григорій Анатолійович Місютін; born 29 December 1970) is a Ukrainian artistic gymnast, formerly representing the Soviet Union and the Unified Team. At the 1992 Summer Olympics, he won a gold medal in the team event and four individual silver medals. He is the 1991 World all-around, rings, and team champion. He is also the 1992 World horizontal bar champion, the 1993 World floor exercise champion, and the 1995 World vault champion. He helped Ukraine win the team bronze medal at the 1996 Summer Olympics.

== Gymnastics career ==
At the 1991 World Championships, Misyutin helped the Soviet Union win its fourth straight World team title. He also qualified for the all-around final in second place, behind teammate Vitaly Scherbo. He went on to win the all-around title ahead of Scherbo, and he won another gold medal on the rings. At the 1992 World Championships, he won a gold medal on the horizontal bar and a bronze medal on the rings.

Misyutin won a gold medal alongside the Unified Team at the 1992 Summer Olympics. He then won the silver medal in the all-around final, behind Scherbo. In the floor exercise final, he tied with Yukio Iketani for the silver medal, and he won the vault silver medal behind Scherbo. He tied with Andreas Wecker for the silver medal on the horizontal bar.

At the 1993 World Championships, Misyutin won the floor exercise title. He won three gold medals at the 1994 Goodwill Games– on the floor exercise, pommel horse, and vault. He tied with Russia's Alexei Nemov for the vault title at the 1995 World Championships. There, he also won a bronze medal on the floor exercise.

Misyutin won a bronze medal on the floor exercise at the 1996 World Championships, behind Vitaly Scherbo and Aleksey Voropayev. He then represented Ukraine at the 1996 Summer Olympics and helped the team win the bronze medal by less than a point ahead of Belarus. Individually, he advanced to the floor exercise final, but he placed last after making mistakes. After a few competitions in 1997, including the Stuttgart World Cup, he retired. In 2004, moved to Saarland, Germany, to coach.
