= Russia men's national artistic gymnastics team =

National sports team

Russia men's national gymnastics team
- Continental union: European Union of Gymnastics
- National federation: Artistic Gymnastics Federation of Russia

Olympic Games
- Appearances: 7
- Medals: Gold: 1996, 2020; Silver: 2016; Bronze: 2000

World Championships
- Appearances: 14
- Medals: Gold: 2019; Silver: 1994, 1999, 2006, 2018, 2026; Bronze: 1997

Junior World Championships
- Appearances: 1

The Russia men's national artistic gymnastics team represents Russia in FIG international competitions. Additionally they have competed as the Russian Olympic Committee (ROC) and the Russian Gymnastics Federation (RGF) due to the World Anti-Doping Agency banning athletes from representing Russia in international competition.

== History ==
Russia has made seven appearances in the men's team competition at the Olympic Games and has won four medals. They won gold twice – first at their debut in 1996 and then again in 2020.

After the 2022 Russian invasion of Ukraine, the International Gymnastics Federation (FIG) barred Russian athletes and officials, including judges. It also announced that "all FIG World Cup and World Challenge Cup events planned to take place in Russia ... are cancelled, and no other FIG events will be allocated to Russia ... until further notice." FIG also banned the Russian flag at its events. European Gymnastics announced in March 2022 that no athletes, officials, and judges from the Russian Gymnastics Federation can participate in any European Gymnastics events, that no European Gymnastics authorities from Russia can pursue their functions, and that European Gymnastics had removed from its calendar all events allocated to Russia and would not allocate any future events to Russia.

Starting in 2025, Russian gymnasts started applying for Individual Neutral Athlete status. If granted, they were permitted to compete internationally as an individual. In May 2026, World Gymnastics lifted all restrictions against Russian athletes.

== Current senior roster ==
Name	Birthdate and age	District represented	AIN status
Matvey Akinshin	20 September 2007 (age 19)	Central Federal District	check
Timofey Akinshin	20 September 2007 (age 19)	Central Federal District	check
Arsenii Dukhno	5 August 2008 (age 18)	Moscow	check
Aleksandr Kartsev	31 December 2001 (age 24)	Central Federal District	check
Evgeni Kissel	15 January 2005 (age 21)	Moscow	
Ivan Kuliak	28 February 2002 (age 24)	Central Federal District	
Daniel Marinov	17 December 2004 (age 21)	Volga	check
Ilya Musin		Central Federal District	check
Sergei Naidin	11 July 2001 (age 25)	Siberia	
Daniil Novikov	17 January 2006 (age 20)	Volga	check
Evgeny Polennikov		Central Federal District	check
Daniil Smirnov	24 November 2008 (age 17)	Northwestern	check
Mukhammadzhon Yakubov	17 April 2003 (age 23)	Central Federal District	check
Ilia Zaika	16 July 2002 (age 24)	Central Federal District	check

== Team competition results ==
=== Olympic Games ===
Year	Position	Squad
1952 through 1992 — participated as the Soviet Union
1996	Gold medal	Alexei Nemov, Alexei Voropaev, Yevgeni Podgorny, Dmitri Vasilenko, Sergei Kharkov, Nikolai Kryukov, Dmitri Trush
2000	Bronze medal	Alexei Nemov, Maxim Aleshin, Alexei Bondarenko, Nikolai Kryukov, Yevgeni Podgorny, Dmitri Drevin
2004	6th place	Aleksei Bondarenko, Maxim Deviatovski, Anton Golotsutskov, Georgi Grebenkov, Aleksei Nemov, Aleksander Safoshkin
2008	6th place	Maxim Devyatovsky, Anton Golotsutskov, Sergei Khorokhordin, Nikolai Kryukov, Konstantin Pluzhnikov, Yuri Ryazanov
2012	6th place	Denis Ablyazin, Aleksandr Balandin, David Belyavskiy, Emin Garibov, Igor Pakhomenko
2016	Silver medal	Denis Ablyazin, David Belyavskiy, Ivan Stretovich, Nikolai Kuksenkov, Nikita Nagornyy
2020	Gold medal	Denis Ablyazin, David Belyavskiy, Artur Dalaloyan, Nikita Nagornyy participated as the Russian Olympic Committee
2024	banned from participating as a team	

=== World Championships ===
Year	Position	Squad
1954 through 1991 — participated as the Soviet Union
1994	Silver medal	Evgeni Chabaev, Evgeni Joukov, Dmitri Karbanenko, Alexei Nemov, Dmitri Trush, Dmitri Vasilenko, Alexei Voropaev
1995	4th place	Dmitri Karbanenko, Evgeni Chabaev, Alexei Voropaev, Alexei Nemov, Dmitri Vasilenko, Evgeni Podgorni
1997	Bronze medal	Dmitri Vasilenko, Alexei Bondarenko, Alexei Voropaev, Alexei Nemov, Evgeni Ghukov, Nikolai Kryukov
1999	Silver medal	Alexei Bondarenko, Nikolai Kryukov, Alexei Nemov, Maxim Aleshin, Rashid Kasumov, Evgeni Podgorni
2001	7th place	Alexei Bondarenko, Alexei Nemov, Georgy Grebenkov, Evgeny Krylov, Nikolai Kryukov, Yury Tikhonovsky
2003	4th place	Alexei Bondarenko, Alexei Nemov, Anton Golotsutskov, Evgeny Podgorny, Nikolai Kryukov
2006	Silver medal	Maxim Deviatovski, Dimitri Gogotov, Sergei Khorokhordin, Nikolai Kryukov, Yury Ryazanov, Alexander Safoshkin
2007	7th place	Yuri Ryazanov, Sergei Khorokhordin, Maxim Devyatovsky, Nikolai Kryukov, Alexander Safoshkin
2010	6th place	Sergey Khorokhordin, Maxim Devyatovskiy, David Belyavskiy, Anton Golotsutskov, Igor Pakhomenko, Andrey Cherkasov
2011	4th place	Konstantin Pluzhnikov, Emin Garibov, Sergei Khorokhordin, David Belyavskiy, Denis Ablyazin, Anton Golotsutskov
2014	5th place	Denis Ablyazin, David Belyavskiy, Nikita Ignatyev, Daniil Kazachkov, Nikolai Kuksenkov, Ivan Stretovich
2015	4th place	Denis Ablyazin, David Belyavskiy, Nikita Ignatyev, Nikolai Kuksenkov, Nikita Nagornyy, Ivan Stretovich
2018	Silver medal	David Belyavskiy, Artur Dalaloyan, Nikolai Kuksenkov, Dmitrii Lankin, Nikita Nagornyy, Vladislav Polyashov
2019	Gold medal	Denis Ablyazin, David Belyavskiy, Artur Dalaloyan, Nikita Nagornyy, Ivan Stretovich, Vladislav Polyashov
2022	banned from participating	
2023	banned from participating	
2026	Silver medal	Arsenii Dukhno, Daniel Marinov, Sergey Naidin, Savelii Sieedin, Ilia Zaika, Mukhammadzhon Iakubov

=== Junior World Championships ===
Year	Position	Squad
2019	9th place	Kirill Gashkov, Ivan Gerget, Ivan Kuliak

== Most decorated gymnasts ==
This list includes all Russian male artistic gymnasts who have won at least four medals at the Olympic Games and the World Artistic Gymnastics Championships combined. Not included are medals won as part of the Soviet Union or Unified Teams.

Rank	Gymnast	Years	Team	AA	FX	PH	SR	VT	PB	HB	Olympic Total	World Total	Total
1	Alexei Nemov	1993–2004	1996; 2000; 1994; 1999; 1997	2000; 1996	2000; 1996; 1997; 1999	1996; 2000; 1999; 1996		1996; 1995; 1996	2000; 1996; 2003; 1994	2000; 1996; 2003	12	13	25
2	Denis Ablyazin	2012–2021	2020; 2016; 2019		2012; 2014		2016; 2017; 2014	2012; 2016; 2020			7	4	11
3	Artur Dalaloyan	2018–2021	2020; 2019; 2018	2018; 2019	2018			2018; 2019	2018	2019	1	9	10
4	Nikita Nagornyy	2016–2021	2020; 2016; 2019; 2018	2020; 2019; 2018				2019		2020	4	5	9
5	Nikolai Kryukov	1996–2006	1996; 2000; 1999; 2006; 1997	1999	1999; 2003			1997			2	7	9
6	David Belyavskiy	2016–2021	2020; 2016; 2019; 2018			2017			2016; 2017		3	4	7
7	Alexei Bondarenko	1997–2000	2000; 1999; 1997	1997				2000	1999		2	4	6
8	Anton Golotsutskov	2008–2011			2008			2008; 2010; 2011; 2009			2	3	5

== See also ==
- Round Lake (gymnastics)
- Russia women's national gymnastics team
- List of Olympic male artistic gymnasts for Russia
