= Irina Bulakhova =

Ukrainian gymnast (born 1978)

- Born: 15 March 1978 (age 48) Kryvyi Rih, Ukrainian SSR, Soviet Union

Gymnastics career
- Discipline: Women's artistic gymnastics
- Country represented: Ukraine
- Club: SK "Bogatyr"
- Retired: yes
Medal record
Women's artistic gymnastics
Representing Ukraine
European Championships
Bronze medal – third place	1994 Stockholm	Team
Goodwill Games
Bronze medal – third place	1994 Saint Petersburg	Team

Irina Bulakhova (born 15 March 1978) is a retired Ukrainian gymnast.

In 1994, Bulakhova competed at the European Championships, held in Stockholm, winning a bronze medal in team competition with Natalia Kalinina and Lilia Podkopayeva. She finished 4th in all-around event, and 6th in floor exercise.

Later she represented Ukraine at the Goodwill Games in Saint Petersburg, finishing 3rd in team competition, 8th in uneven bars event and 6th in floor exercise.

In that year, Irina competed at the World Championships, finishing 16th in all-around competition.

In 1995, Irina with Rustam Sharipov won a silver medal at the International Mixed Pairs competition in Seattle.

She also competed at the World Championships, finishing 5th in team competition.
