= Nadia Hațegan =

Romanian gymnast (born 1979)

- Born: 13 August 1979 (age 47) Mediaș
- Height: 1.62 m (5 ft 4 in)

Gymnastics career
- Discipline: Women's artistic gymnastics
- Country represented: Romania
- Club: Cetate Deva
- Head coach: Octavian Bellu
- Assistant coach: Mariana Bitang
- Former coaches: Nicolae Forminte, Toma Ponoran
- Retired: December 1995
Medal record
World Championships
Gold medal – first place	1994 Dortmund	Team
Gold medal – first place	1995 Sabae	Team
European Championships
Gold medal – first place	1994 Stockholm	Team
Gold medal – first place	1992 Arezzo	Team (Junior)
Gold medal – first place	1993 Geneve	Uneven bars (Junior)

Nadia Hațegan (born 13 August 1979 in Mediaş, Romania) is a retired Romanian artistic gymnast. She was a double world champion with the team (1994 and 1995) and a three-time gold medalist at the European Championships (1992, 1993, and 1994).
