= Amaya Cardeñoso =

Former Spanish gymnast (born 1976)

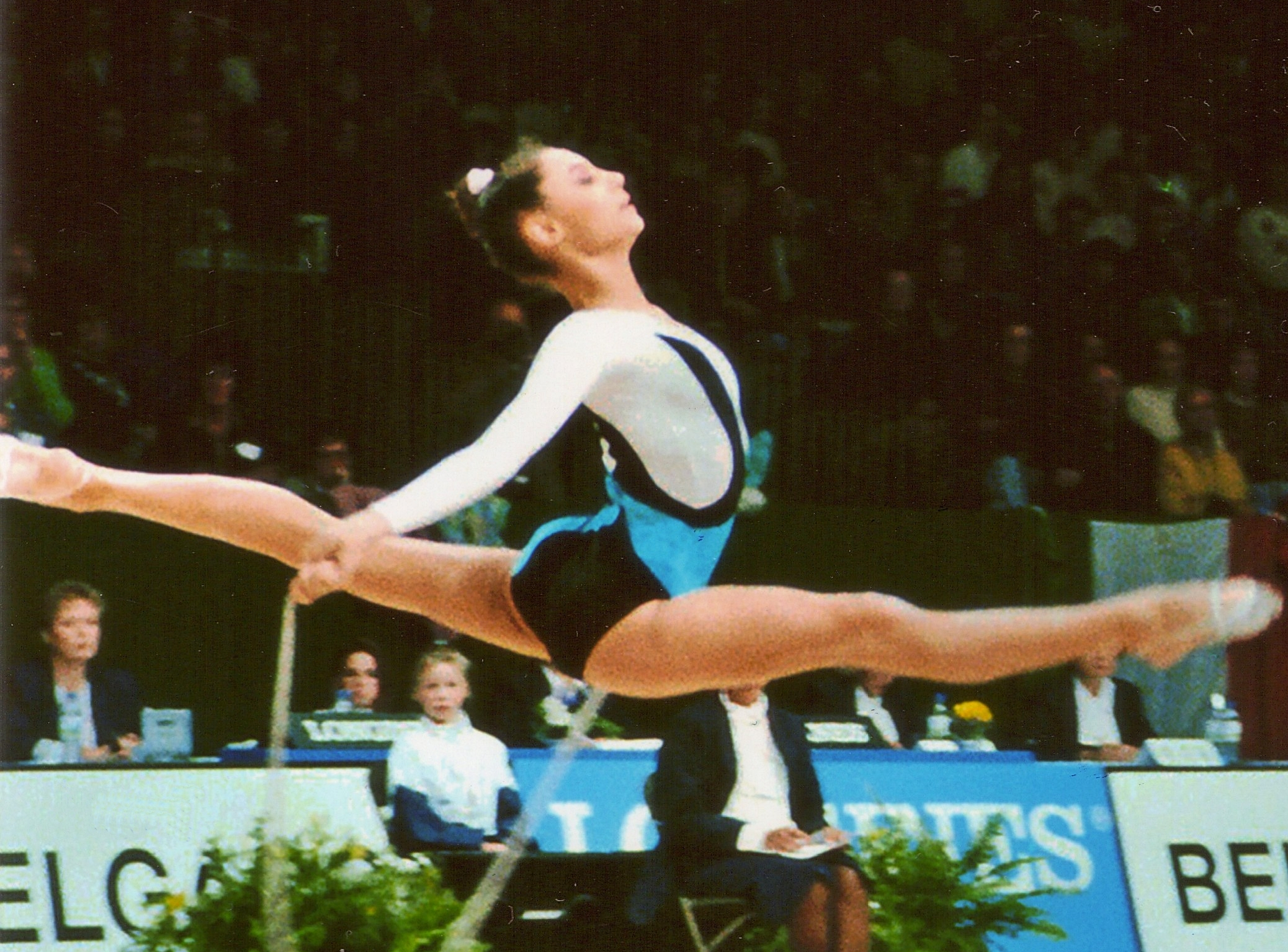

Personal information
- Full name: Amaya Cardeñoso Durantez
- Born: February 13, 1976 (age 50) Valladolid, Spain

Gymnastics career
- Discipline: Rhythmic gymnastics
- Country represented: Spain (1991-1995)
- Club: E.T.G of Valladolid
- Retired: yes

Amaya Cardeñoso Durantez (13 February 1976) is a former Spanish rhythmic gymnast, member of the Spanish national rhythmic gymnastics team. She has participated in 3 World Championships and 1 European Championship, her best overall position was 11th place at the World Championships in 1994.

== Career ==
In the beginnings, Amaya was trained by the ex-gymnast of the national team Virginia Manzanera in the E.T.G. of Valladolid. By 1990 she won bronze in the youth category at the Spanish Championship in Palencia, and 8th in the Final of the I Cup of Spain in Alicante.

In 1991 she was chosen by Emilia Boneva to enter the national team as an individual, training since then at the Moscardó Gym in Madrid. That same year she was 7th in the honor category at the Spanish Championship, held in Torrevieja.

By April 1992, Amaya was 7th in the honor category at the Spanish Championships in San Sebastián. In November she was 8th at the Alfred Vogel Cup in Deventer. That same month, after an injury to Carolina Pascual, she made her World Championships debut in Brussels, where she placed 19th overall.

In May 1993, she was 7th overall in the Alicante City International Tournament. That same year she was 5th at nationals, held in Valladolid, being surpassed by Carmen Acedo, Noelia Fernández, Carolina Pascual and Susana Gómez. In November Cardeñoso attended the World Championships in Alicante, where she was 4th in the team competition along with Carmen Acedo, Rosabel Espinosa and Carolina Pascual. She performed only with rope, finishing in 118th place in the All-Around, and finishing 5th in rope final tied with her teammate Rosabel Espinosa and Magdalena Brzeska.

She was 5th overall at the Julieta Shishmanova tournament in May 1994, and 13th overall and 8th for teams at the Corbeil-Essonnes tournament. That same month she participated in the European Championships in Thessaloniki, ranking 14th in the individual All-Around and 6th in the rope final. That same year he won the bronze medal in Spanish Championships in Valladolid. On August 2, 1994, at the Goodwill Games in Saint Petersburg, she was 4th in the All-Around and won silver in the ribbon final. In the Austria Cup that year she was 4th overall and got gold in the hoop, balls, clubs and ribbon finals. In October she participated in the World Championships in Paris, where she ranked 11th overall, being the best ranked Spanish gymnast.

After her retirement, Amaya trained at the Calpe Gymnastics Club in Calpe, and later moved to Ibiza, where she worked as a go-go dancer. Since 2010 she trained at Club Tanit in Ibiza. She is currently a coach at the CGR San Antonio club in Sant Antoni de Portmany, a club she created and presides over. One of her gymnasts, Leonor Urruty-Etchepare, was national champion in the Benjamin category in 2018, and several of her gymnasts are selected to form part of the call ups of the Gymnastics Federation of the Balearic Islands.
