= Olga Gontar =

Belarusian rhythmic gymnast

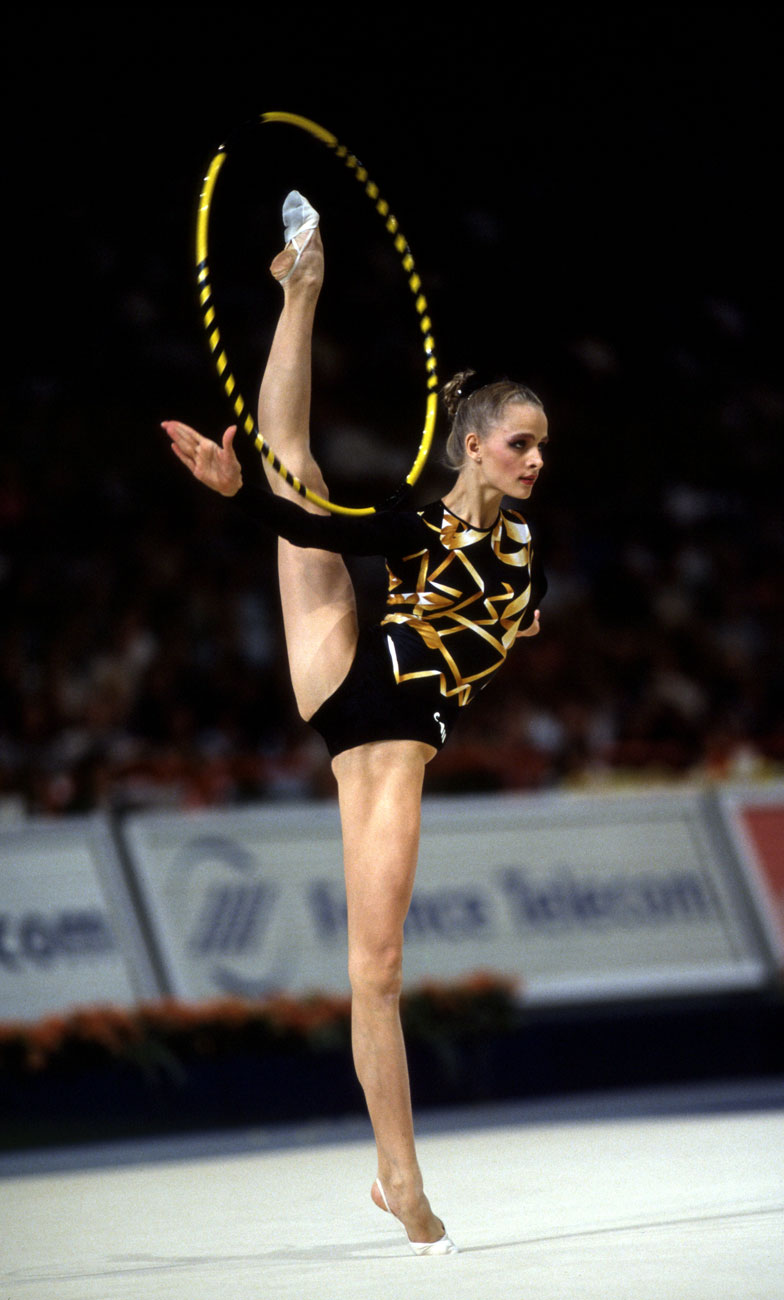
- Olga Gontar at the World Championships in Paris-Bercy, 1994

Personal information
- Born: January 11, 1979 (age 47) Minsk, Belarus

Gymnastics career
- Discipline: Rhythmic gymnastics
- Country represented: Belarus (Dinamo Minsk)
- Head coach: Irina Leparskaya
- Assistant coach: Galina Krylenko
- Retired: 1996
Medal record
Rhythmic Gymnastics
Representing Belarus
European Championships
Silver medal – second place	1994 Thessaloniki	Team
Junior European Championships
Gold medal – first place	1993 Bucharest	All-Around
Gold medal – first place	1993 Bucharest	Ball
Gold medal – first place	1993 Bucharest	Ribbon
Silver medal – second place	1993 Bucharest	Rope
European Cup Final
Gold medal – first place	1995 Telford	Ball
Grand Prix Final
Gold medal – first place	1995 Deventer	Rope
Bronze medal – third place	1995 Deventer	All-around
Bronze medal – third place	1995 Deventer	Ribbon

Olga Gontar (Belarusian: Вольга Гонтарь; Russian: Ольга Гонтарь, born January 11, 1979, in Minsk, Belarus) is a Belarusian individual rhythmic gymnast. She is the 1995 Grand Prix Final all-around bronze medalist and the 1993 European Junior all-around champion.

== Career ==
Gontar started competitive rhythmic gymnastics at 4 years old. In 1991, at age 12, she won the first of three consecutive all-around titles at the Schmiden International. She then took the all-around gold at the 1993 European Junior Championships, and also came in first on both ball and ribbon and was second with rope.

Gontar debuted as a senior in the 1994 season. 1995 was her last and busiest year in rhythmic. She won bronze in the all-around at the 1995 Grand Prix Final, in the event finals; she won gold in rope (tied with Olena Vitrychenko and Yanina Batyrchina) and bronze in ribbon. Before she could compete at the World Championships, reports surfaced that a back injury was forcing her out and would be the deciding factor in her early retirement from the sport at the atypically young age of 16.

After she completed her career in rhythmic gymnastics, Gontar briefly made a modeling career appearing in print ads and magazine covers for European luxury brands in Milan and Paris.
