= Ihor Korobchynskyi =

Soviet gymnast (born 1969)

- Born: 16 August 1969 (age 57) Antratsyt, Luhansk Oblast, Ukrainian SSR, Soviet Union
- Height: 168 cm (5 ft 6 in)

Gymnastics career
- Discipline: Men's artistic gymnastics
- Country represented: Ukraine
- Former countries represented: Unified Team; Commonwealth of Independent States; Soviet Union
Medal record
Olympic Games
Gold medal – first place	1992 Barcelona	Team
Bronze medal – third place	1992 Barcelona	Parallel bars
Bronze medal – third place	1996 Atlanta	Team
World Championships
Gold medal – first place	1989 Stuttgart	Floor
Gold medal – first place	1989 Stuttgart	All-around
Gold medal – first place	1989 Stuttgart	Team
Gold medal – first place	1991 Indianapolis	Floor
Gold medal – first place	1991 Indianapolis	Team
Gold medal – first place	1992 Paris	Floor
Silver medal – second place	1991 Indianapolis	Parallel bars
Silver medal – second place	1992 Paris	Vault
Silver medal – second place	1993 Birmingham	Parallel bars
Bronze medal – third place	1992 Paris	Horizontal bar
Bronze medal – third place	1994 Dortmund	Team
European Championships
Gold medal – first place	1989 Stockholm	All-Around
Gold medal – first place	1989 Stockholm	Floor Exercise
Gold medal – first place	1992 Budapest	All-Around
Gold medal – first place	1992 Budapest	Pommel Horse
Silver medal – second place	1992 Budapest	Floor Exercise
Silver medal – second place	1992 Budapest	Vault
Silver medal – second place	1992 Budapest	Parallel Bars
Silver medal – second place	1994 Prague	All-Around
Bronze medal – third place	1994 Prague	Parallel Bars
Summer Universiade
Gold medal – first place	1993 Buffalo	Floor
Bronze medal – third place	1993 Buffalo	All-Around

Igor Korobchinski (Ukrainian: Коробчинський Ігор Олексійович, Ihor Korobchynskyi; born 16 August 1969) is a former gymnast that represented the Soviet Union, the Commonwealth of Independent States and Ukraine. In 2016, he was inducted in the International Gymnastics Hall of Fame. Korobchinski competed at the 1992 Summer Olympics, and 1996 Summer Olympics.

In addition to being 1989 World All-Around Champion, 1989 European All-Around Champion, and 1990 European All-Around Champion, Korobchynskyi was also World Champion on the Floor Exercise for 3 World Championships in a row (1989, 1991, and 1992).
