= Oksana Knizhnik =

Ukrainian gymnast (born 1977)

- Born: 3 January 1977 (age 49) Kyiv, Ukraine

Gymnastics career
- Discipline: Women's artistic gymnastics
- Country represented: Ukraine
Medal record
Representing Ukraine
Goodwill Games
Bronze medal – third place	1994 Saint Petersburg	Team

Oksana Knizhnik (born 3 January 1977) is a Ukrainian gymnast. She competed in five events at the 1996 Summer Olympics.

== See also ==
- List of Olympic female artistic gymnasts for Ukraine
