= Ivan Ivanov (gymnast) =

Bulgarian gymnast (born 1974)

- Иван Янев Иванов
- Full name: Ivan Yanev Ivanov
- Born: 26 September 1974 (age 51) Varna, Bulgaria

Gymnastics career
- Discipline: Men's artistic gymnastics
- Country represented: Bulgaria
Medal record
Representing Bulgaria
European Championships
Gold medal – first place	1994 Prague	Floor exercise

Ivan Yanev Ivanov (Bulgarian: Иван Янев Иванов) (born 26 September 1974) is a Bulgarian gymnast. He competed at the 1996 Summer Olympics. He is the 1994 European Champion on floor exericse.
