= Dimitri Karbanenko =

French gymnast (born 1973)

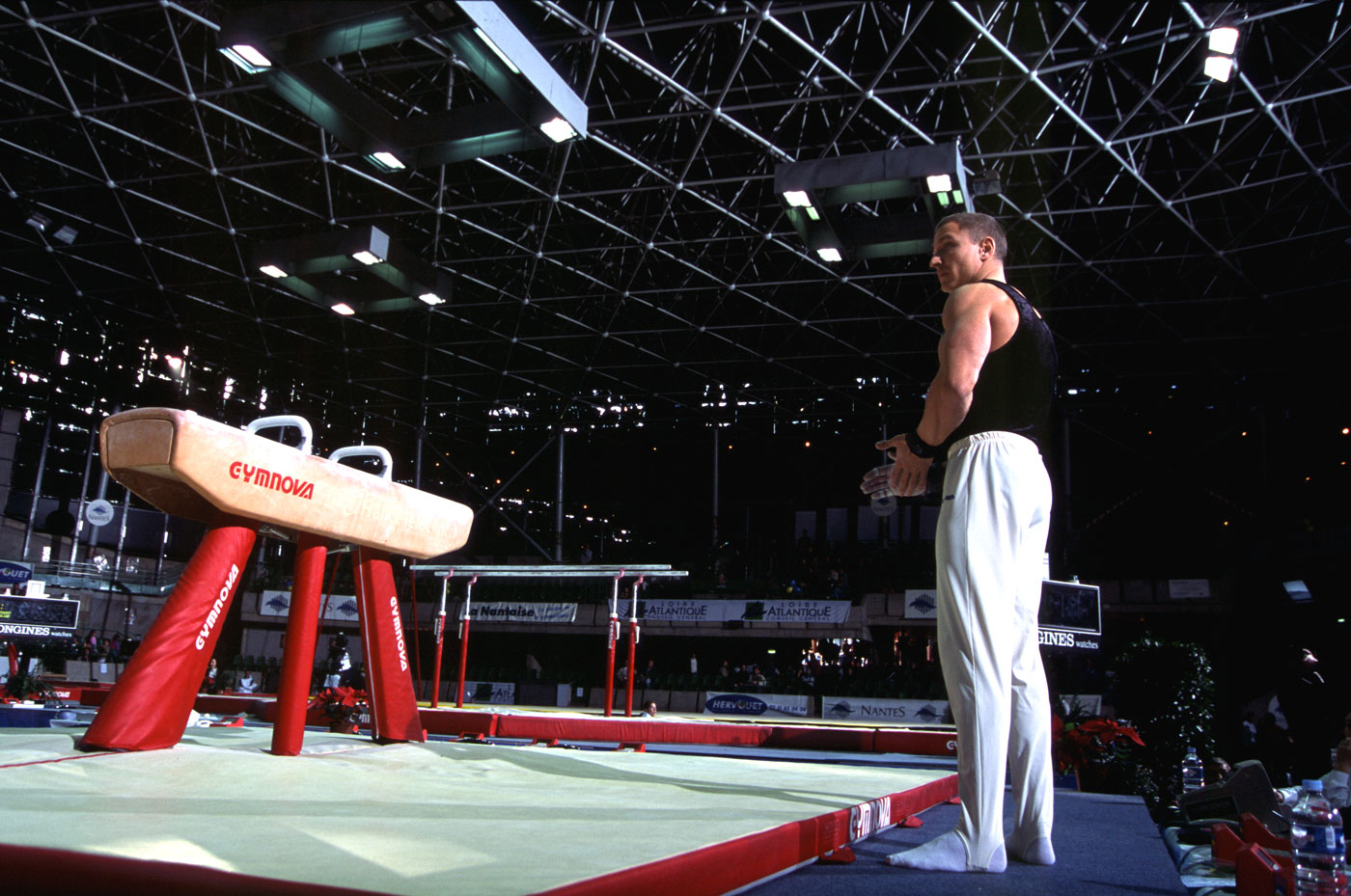
- Karbanenko at the 2001 European Club Championship

Personal information
- Born: 19 July 1973 (age 53) Kaliningrad, Russian SFSR, Soviet Union
- Height: 174 cm (5 ft 9 in)

Gymnastics career
- Discipline: Men's artistic gymnastics
- Country represented: France; (1997–2008)
- Former countries represented: Russia (1993–1996)
Medal record
Men's artistic gymnastics
Representing Russia
World Championships
Silver medal – second place	1994 Dortmund	Team
Representing France
World Championships
Silver medal – second place	1997 Lausanne	Floor exercise
European Championships
Gold medal – first place	1998 Saint Petersburg	Team
Silver medal – second place	1998 Saint Petersburg	All-around
Silver medal – second place	2000 Bremen	Vault
Bronze medal – third place	2004 Ljubljana	Team
Mediterranean Games
Gold medal – first place	2001 Tunis	Team
Gold medal – first place	2001 Tunis	Floor exercise
Gold medal – first place	2001 Tunis	Vault
Silver medal – second place	1997 Bari	All-around
Silver medal – second place	1997 Bari	Vault
Bronze medal – third place	1997 Bari	Team
Bronze medal – third place	1997 Bari	Parallel bars

Dimitri Nikolayevich Karbanenko (born 19 July 1973) is a French former artistic gymnast. He is the 1997 World floor exercise silver medalist and the 1998 European all-around silver medalist. He participated in the 2000, 2004 and 2008 Summer Olympics. Born in the Soviet Union, he competed for Russia before becoming a French citizen in 1997, and won a team silver medal at the 1994 World Championships.

== Gymnastics career ==
Karbanenko began gymnastics at five years old and trained at the CSKA Sports Complex in Moscow.

Karbanenko placed fifth in the all-around final at the 1993 World Championships. He also placed sixth in the parallel bars final and eighth in the horizontal bar final. He then helped Russia win the silver medal at the 1994 World Team Championships. He competed with the Russian team that placed fourth at the 1995 World Championships. Individually, he placed 23rd in the all-around final and eighth in the horizontal bar final.

Karbanenko was left off Russia's 1996 Olympic team at the last minute, leading him to pursue French citizenship. He was eligible for citizenship through his marriage, and he moved to Cannes. He began competing for France in 1997 and won a bronze medal on the floor exercise at the Stuttgart World Cup. He then won the silver medal on the floor exercise at the 1997 World Championships, behind former teammate Alexei Nemov.

Karbanenko helped France upset Russia for the team title at the 1998 European Championships, held in Saint Petersburg. He also won a silver medal in the all-around competition. At the 1998 Paris World Cup, Karbanenko won the floor exercise gold medal. He finished seventh in the floor exercise final at the 1999 World Championships.

At the 2000 European Championships, Karbanenko won the vault silver medal behind Romania's Ioan Silviu Suciu. He then represented France at the 2000 Summer Olympics and advanced into the all-around final, finishing 15th. He won a silver medal on the horizontal bar at the 2001 Paris World Cup, behind Aljaž Pegan, and he won three gold medals at the 2001 Mediterranean Games. He finished fifth in the horizontal bar final at the 2002 European Championships. He then won the floor exercise bronze medal at the 2002 Paris World Cup.

Karbanenko finished 18th in the all-around final at the 2003 World Championships. He won the horizontal bar silver medal at the 2004 Lyon World Cup. At the 2004 European Championships, he helped France win the team bronze medal. He injured his hand before the 2004 Summer Olympics but still competed, and he did not advance into any finals.

Karbanenko finished fifth in the floor exercise final at the 2005 European Championships. He then won the floor exercise silver medal at the 2005 Paris World Cup. At the 2006 European Championships, he finished fourth in the parallel bars final. He then finished 15th in the all-around final at the 2006 World Championships. At the 2007 European Championships, he finished fourth in the horizontal bar final and sixth in the parallel bars final.

Karbanenko represented France at the 2008 Summer Olympics and helped the team advance into the final, where they finished eighth. He announced his retirement in 2009.

== Personal life ==
Karbanenko married a French journalist. His first child was born in 1999, but his wife died a few days later. He has another daughter, born in 2006, with his second wife.

After retiring from the sport, Karbanenko began working as an assistant coach for the Japanese national team until 2013. He then began coaching for the Belgian team before returning to France.
