= Ionela Loaieș =

Romanian artistic gymnast

- Born: 2 February 1979 (age 47) Comănești, Romania

Gymnastics career
- Discipline: Women's artistic gymnastics
- Country represented: Romania
- Club: CSS Onești
- Head coach: Octavian Belu
- Assistant coach: Mariana Bitang
Medal record
Representing Romania
Olympic Games
Bronze medal – third place	1996 Atlanta	Team
World Championships
Gold medal – first place	1994 Dortmund	Team all-around

Ionela Loaieș (born 2 February 1979 in Comănești) is a Romanian artistic gymnast. She is an Olympic bronze medalist and a world gold medalist with the team.
