= Cristian Leric =

Romanian artistic gymnast

- Born: 27 June 1974 (age 52) Arad

Gymnastics career
- Discipline: Men's artistic gymnastics
- Country represented: Romania
- Club: CS Arad
- Head coach: Danuţ Grecu
Medal record
World Championships
Bronze medal – third place	1995 Sabae	Team
European Championships
Silver medal – second place	1994 Prague	Vault
Bronze medal – third place	1996 Copenhagen	Vault

Cristian Leric (born 27 June 1974 in Arad, Romania) is a retired Romanian artistic gymnast whose best event was the vault. He is a world bronze medalist with the team and a two-time continental medalist on vault. After retirement he performed in the Aeros entertainment show.
