= Aleksandr Shostak =

Belarusian gymnast (born 1974)

- Born: 1 March 1974 (age 52) Minsk, Belarus

Gymnastics career
- Discipline: Men's artistic gymnastics
- Country represented: Belarus
Medal record
Representing Belarus
European Championships
Gold medal – first place	1994 Prague	Team

Aleksandr Shostak (born 1 March 1974) is a Belarusian gymnast. He competed at the 1996 Summer Olympics and the 2000 Summer Olympics.
