= Oksana Fabrichnova =

Russian artistic gymnast (born 1978)

Medal record

Representing Russia

Artistic gymnastics

World Championships
Bronze medal – third place	1994 Dortmund	Team
Bronze medal – third place	1994 Brisbane	Balance Beam

Goodwill Games
Gold medal – first place	1994 St Petersburg	Team
Silver medal – second place	1994 St Petersburg	Balance Beam

European Championships
Silver medal – second place	1994 Stockholm	Team
Silver medal – second place	1994 Stockholm	Uneven Bars

Oksana Ilyinichna Fabrichnova (born November 24, 1978, in Moscow, Russia) is a former artistic gymnast. In 1993, she finished first in the all-around at the European Cup and fifth in the all-around at the 1993 World Championships. At the 1994 World Team Championships, Fabrichnova helped Russia win the bronze medal in the team competition and won the bronze medal on balance beam at the individual 1994 World Artistic Gymnastics Championships. She was an alternate for Russia at the 1996 Summer Olympics.

After retiring from gymnastics, Fabrichnova performed in a circus and then became a doctor. She is married to Dmitry Kolozin, and the couple has one daughter, Irina.

== Eponymous skill ==
Fabrichnova has one eponymous uneven bars dismount listed in the Code of Points.

Apparatus	Name	Description	Difficulty (Note: Valid for the 2025–2028 Code of Points)
Uneven bars	Fabrichnova	Double-twisting double tuck dismount	F (0.6)

== Competitive history ==
Year	Event	Team	AA	VT	UB	BB	FX
1993	World Championships		5th			6th	
1994	European Championships	2nd	7th	6th	2nd	6th	
1994	World Championships	3rd				3rd	

Year	Competition	Location	Apparatus	Rank-Final	Score-Final	Rank-Qualifying	Score-Qualifying
1994	World Championships	Dortmund	Team	3	194.546	4	385.515
1994	World Championships	Brisbane	Balance beam	3	9.712	8	9.612
1994	European Championships	Stockholm	Team	2	115.422		
1994	European Championships	Stockholm	All-around	7	38.711		
1994	European Championships	Stockholm	Vault	6	9.712		
1994	European Championships	Stockholm	Uneven bars	2	9.837		
1994	European Championships	Stockholm	Balance beam	6	9.700		
1993	World Championships	Birmingham	All-around	5	38.630	26	36.880
1993	World Championships	Birmingham	Vault			13	9.618
1993	World Championships	Birmingham	Uneven bars			84	8.000
1993	World Championships	Birmingham	Balance beam	6	9.212	3	9.812
1993	World Championships	Birmingham	Floor exercise			16	9.450
