= Nikolai Kryukov (gymnast) =

Russian artistic gymnast

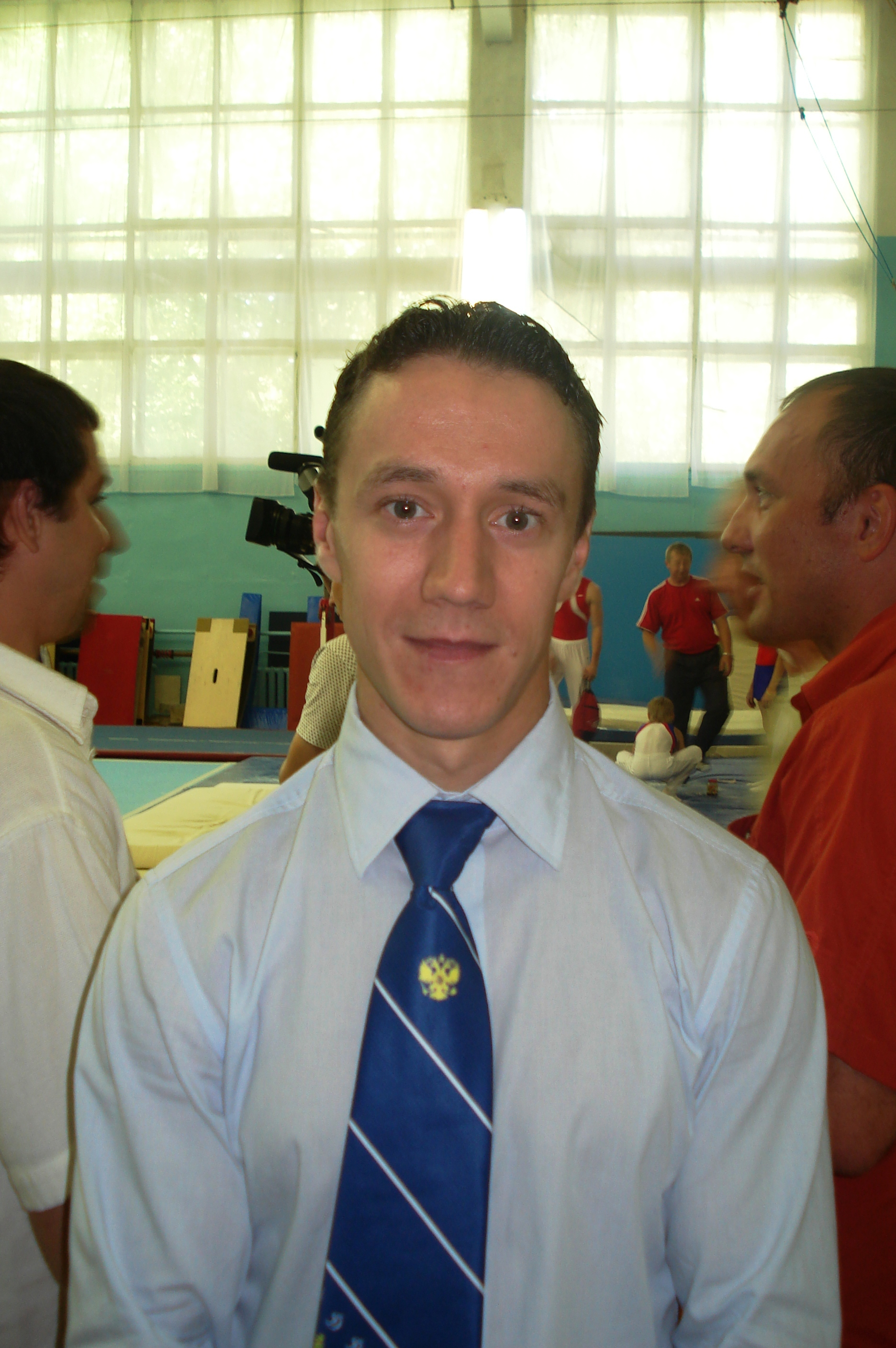

Personal information
- Full name: Nikolai Vyacheslavovich Kryukov
- Born: 11 November 1978 (age 47) Voronezh, Russia
- Height: 164 cm (5 ft 5 in)

Gymnastics career
- Discipline: Men's artistic gymnastics
- Country represented: Russia
Medal record
Representing Russia
Artistic Gymnastics
Olympic Games
Gold medal – first place	1996 Atlanta	Team
Bronze medal – third place	2000 Sydney	Team
World Championships
Gold medal – first place	1999 Tianjin	All-around
Silver medal – second place	1997 Lausanne	Vault
Silver medal – second place	1999 Tianjin	Team
Silver medal – second place	2006 Aarhus	Team
Bronze medal – third place	1997 Lausanne	Team
Bronze medal – third place	1999 Tianjin	Pommel horse
Bronze medal – third place	2003 Anaheim	Pommel horse
European Championships
Gold medal – first place	2008 Lausanne	Team
Silver medal – second place	2002 Patras	Team
Silver medal – second place	2007 Amsterdam	Parallel bars
Bronze medal – third place	2005 Debrecen	Pommel horse
Bronze medal – third place	2008 Lausanne	Parallel bars
European Team Championships
Gold medal – first place	2001 Riesa	Team

Nikolai Vyacheslavovich Kryukov (Russian: Николай Вячеславович Крюков; born 11 November 1978 in Voronezh) is a Russian artistic gymnast. A three-time Olympian, he was also the all-around champion at the 1999 World Artistic Gymnastics Championships in Tianjin.

== See also ==
- List of Olympic male artistic gymnasts for Russia
