= Andrey Kan =

Belarusian gymnast (born 1971)

- Born: 5 November 1971 (age 54) Baranovichi, Byelorussian SSR, Soviet Union

Gymnastics career
- Discipline: Men's artistic gymnastics
- Country represented: Belarus
Medal record
Representing Belarus
European Championships
Gold medal – first place	1994 Prague	Team

Andrey Kan (born 5 November 1971) is a Belarusian gymnast. He competed in eight events at the 1996 Summer Olympics.
