= Vitaly Rudnitsky =

Belarusian gymnast (born 1974)

- Born: 29 November 1974 (age 51) Mogilev, Byelorussian SSR, Soviet Union

Gymnastics career
- Discipline: Men's artistic gymnastics
- Country represented: Belarus
Medal record
Representing Belarus
European Championships
Gold medal – first place	1994 Prague	Team

Vitaly Rudnitsky (born 29 November 1974) is a Belarusian gymnast. He competed at the 1996 Summer Olympics and the 2000 Summer Olympics.
