= Elena Grosheva =

Russian artistic gymnast

- Full name: Elena Nikolayevna Grosheva
- Alternative name: Yelena
- Born: April 12, 1979 (age 47) Russian SFSR, Soviet Union

Gymnastics career
- Discipline: Women's artistic gymnastics
- Country represented: Russia
- Gym: Round Lake
Medal record
Representing Russia
Olympic Games
Silver medal – second place	1996 Atlanta	Team
World Championships
Silver medal – second place	1997 Lausanne	Team
Bronze medal – third place	1994 Dortmund	Team
Goodwill Games
Gold medal – first place	1994 St Petersburg	Team
Bronze medal – third place	1994 St Petersburg	All Around

Yelena Nikolayevna Grosheva (Russian: Елена Николаевна Грошева; born April 12, 1979) is a Russian former competitive gymnast. She won silver in the team event at the 1996 Summer Olympics and two team medals at the World Championships.

== Personal life ==
Grosheva was born on April 12, 1979, in Russia.

== Honors and awards ==
- Master of Sports of Russia
- International Master of Sports of Russia
- Honored Master of Sports of Russia

== Career ==
Grosheva took up gymnastics at the age of five and showed a natural talent for the sport. In 1992, she was sent to Round Lake to train as part of the national team. Her first big competition was the 1994 Junior European Championships and later the same year she went to the World Championships.

At the 1994 Goodwill Games she had a stellar competition and one of the high points of her career, being a pivotal part of the Russian gold medal winning team, and winning bronze behind Dina Kochetkova and Shannon Miller, and ahead of such stars as Lilia Podkopayeva in the women's All Around. In 1996, Grosheva finished second all-around in the Russian Cup and became a member of the Olympic team. At the Olympic Games in Atlanta, the Russian team was in the lead after the compulsories, but ultimately they finished second behind the Americans. She placed into vault event finals, but finished a disappointing 7th. Her floor exercise scores had placed her highest among the Russians for event finals, but she was replaced by teammate Dina Kochetkova. Overall score was 32.057.

=== Post-competitive career ===
After being hampered by injuries Grosheva retired from the sport and joined Cirque du Soleil. In March 2007, she was appointed UNICEF Canada Goodwill Ambassador with her husband.

== Competitive history ==
Year	Event	Team	AA	VT	UB	BB	FX
1994	World Championships	3rd	12th				
1995	World Championships	4th	21st	7th		8th	
1996	Olympic Games	2nd		7th			WD
1997	World Championships	2nd					

Year	Competition description	Location	Apparatus	Rank-Final	Score-Final	Rank-Qualifying	Score-Qualifying
1997	World Championships	Lausanne	Team	2	153.197	1	153.401
1997	World Championships	Lausanne	Vault			40	9.200
1997	World Championships	Lausanne	Balance beam			16	9.400
1997	World Championships	Lausanne	Floor exercise			52	8.912
1996	Olympic Games	Atlanta	Team	2	388.404		
1996	Olympic Games	Atlanta	All-around			14	77.024
1996	Olympic Games	Atlanta	Vault	7	9.637	7	19.500
1996	Olympic Games	Atlanta	Uneven bars			47	19.012
1996	Olympic Games	Atlanta	Balance beam			21	18.987
1996	Olympic Games	Atlanta	Floor exercise	WD		8	19.525
1995	World Championships	Sabae	Team	4	384.689		
1995	World Championships	Sabae	All-around	21	37.955	13	76.798
1995	World Championships	Sabae	Vault	7	9.293	4	19.387
1995	World Championships	Sabae	Uneven bars			13	19.362
1995	World Championships	Sabae	Balance beam	8	9.562	9	19.312
1995	World Championships	Sabae	Floor exercise			37	19.099
1994	World Championships	Dortmund	Team	3	194.546	4	385.515
1994	World Championships	Brisbane	All-around	12	38.324		

== See also ==
- List of Olympic female gymnasts for Russia
