= Dmitri Vasilenko =

Russian gymnast (1975–2019)

- Full name: Dmitri Andreyevich Vasilenko
- Born: 12 November 1975 Cherkessk, Russian SFSR, Soviet Union
- Died: 4 November 2019 (aged 43) France

Gymnastics career
- Discipline: Men's artistic gymnastics
- Country represented: Russia
- Head coach: Alexander Kudinov
Medal record
Olympics
Gold medal – first place	1996 Atlanta	Team
World Championships
Bronze medal – third place	1997 Lausanne	Team

Dmitri Andreyevich Vasilenko (Russian: Дмитрий Андреевич Василенко; 12 November 1975 – 4 November 2019) was an Olympic gymnast who competed for Russia in the 1996 Olympic Games. He won a gold medal in the team competition. He was an alternate to the 2000 Olympic team.

After his career ended, he moved to France to coach, but was diagnosed with ALS in 2008. According to former teammate Alexei Nemov’s Instagram page, Vasilenko's relatives informed Nemov that Vasilenko was in a coma on life support. Two days later, Nemov confirmed on Instagram Vasilenko had died on 4 November 2019, eight days before he was to turn 44 years old.

== See also ==
- List of Olympic male artistic gymnasts for Russia
