= 1994 Goodwill Games =

International sports event held in Saint Petersburg, Russia, in 1994

- Official logo
- Host city: Saint Petersburg
- Country: Russia
- Opening: 23 July 1994
- Closing: 7 August 1994

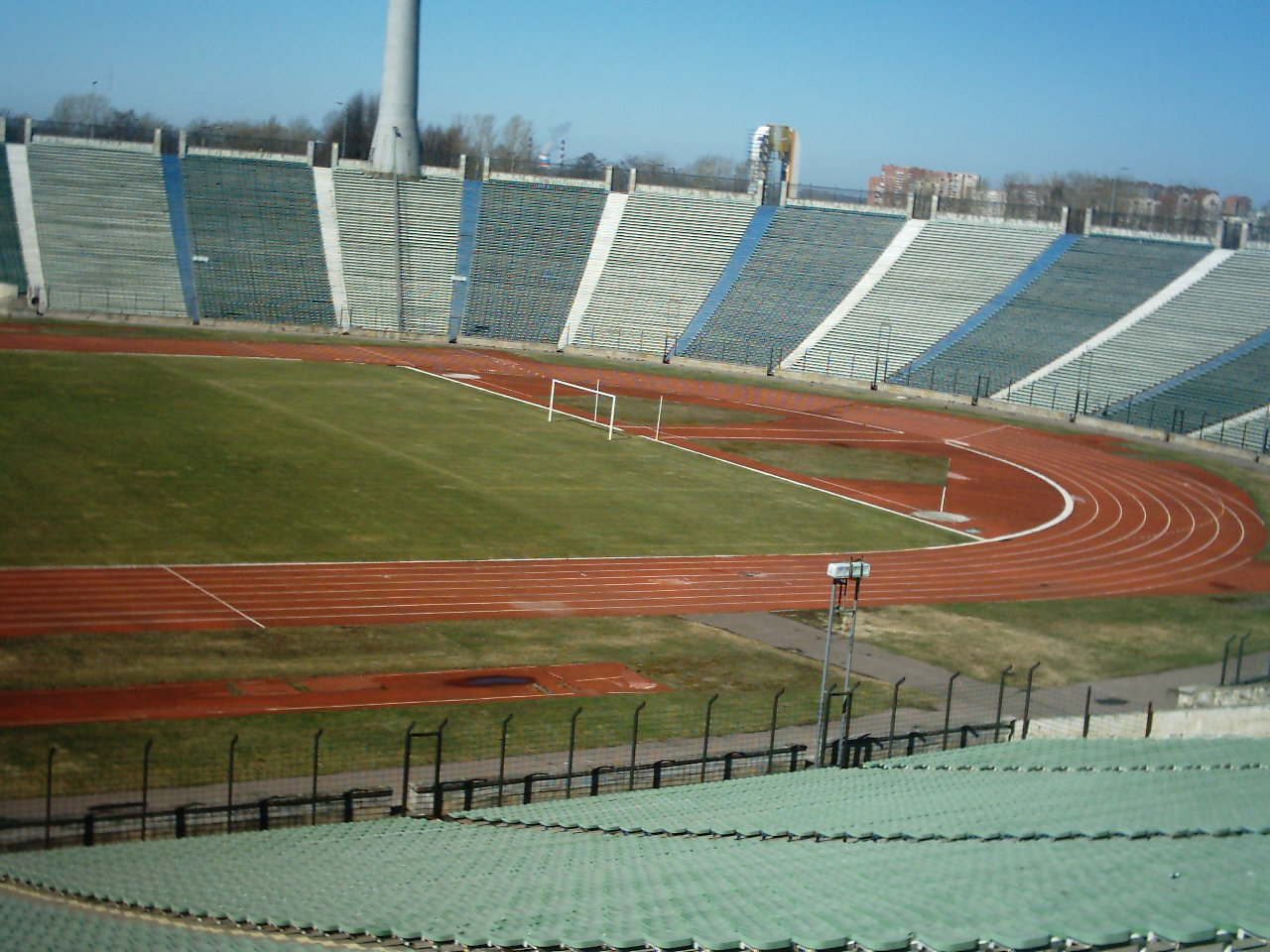
Kirov Stadium hosted the opening and closing ceremonies for the 1994 Games

The 1994 Goodwill Games was the third edition of the multi-sport event, created by Ted Turner, which was held in Saint Petersburg, Russia between July 23 and August 7, 1994. The event – designed to improve Soviet Union – United States relations over the Cold War period – was originally awarded to Leningrad, but the disintegration of the Soviet Union in 1991 saw the city return to its former name within a new Russia. In total, around 2000 athletes from 56 countries participated in the 16-day event. The Russian president Boris Yeltsin opened the games at Kirov Stadium on July 23.

Russia topped the medal table with 68 gold medals and 171 medals in total from the competition. The United States was the runner-up having won 37 golds and 119 medals overall, while the People's Republic of China took third place with 12 golds and 27 medals. In addition to Russia, nine other former Soviet republics won medals at the games: Ukraine and Belarus were among the top-8 in the medal table, and Georgia, Armenia, Latvia, Estonia, Uzbekistan, Moldova and Kazakhstan were the other new states to medal at the games.

The hosting of the games provided a significant legacy of infrastructure within St. Petersburg. Around 500 kilometres (300 mi) of road was repaved, venues and landmarks were renovated, computer equipment was installed and donated, and 70 purpose-built Games buses were later integrated into the city's public transport system. The prospect of a Russia more open to foreign investment sparked growth in the level of sponsorship and the games attracted 30 international sponsors. Television coverage also expanded; the games was broadcast throughout the United States on both TBS and the ABC Television Network, and the games events were shown in a total of 129 countries.

The weightlifting events saw five world records broken as Russia lifters took a clean sweep of the gold medals. In the gymnastics competition, Alexei Nemov set a Goodwill Games record for the number of medals won at a single edition, having won four gold medals, one silver medal and one bronze.

== Sports ==
- Archery
- Athletics
- Basketball
- Beach volleyball
- Boxing
- Canoeing
- Cycling
- Diving
- Figure skating
- Football
- Gymnastics
- Handball
- Judo
- Rowing
- Short track speed skating
- Swimming
- Synchronized swimming
- Taekwondo
- Triathlon
- Volleyball
- Water polo
- Weightlifting
- Wrestling
- Yachting

== Participating nations ==
- Algeria
- Armenia
- Australia
- Austria
- Belarus
- Belgium
- Brazil
- Bulgaria
- Canada
- China
- Costa Rica
- Cuba
- Denmark
- Egypt
- Estonia
- Finland
- France
- Georgia
- Germany
- Hungary
- Iran
- Ireland
- Italy
- Jamaica
- Japan
- Kazakhstan
- Kenya
- Latvia
- Mexico
- Moldova
- Morocco
- Mozambique
- Namibia
- Netherlands
- New Zealand
- Nigeria
- Norway
- Poland
- Portugal
- Puerto Rico
- Romania
- Russia
- Slovakia
- Slovenia
- Somalia
- South Korea
- Spain
- Sweden
- Syria
- Turkey
- Ukraine
- Great Britain
- United States
- Uzbekistan
- U.S. Virgin Islands
- Zambia

== Medal table ==
* Host nation (Russia)

Rank	Nation	Gold	Silver	Bronze	Total
1	Russia (RUS)*	68	50	53	171
2	United States (USA)	37	39	43	119
3	China (CHN)	12	9	6	27
4	South Korea (KOR)	10	5	0	15
5	Cuba (CUB)	9	9	6	24
6	Ukraine (UKR)	8	3	11	22
7	Norway (NOR)	4	0	0	4
8	Belarus (BLR)	3	6	14	23
9	Great Britain (GBR)	3	5	3	11
10	Canada (CAN)	3	4	5	12
11	France (FRA)	3	3	6	12
12	Germany (GER)	2	7	13	22
13	Italy (ITA)	2	1	4	7
13	Spain (ESP)	2	1	4	7
15	Kenya (KEN)	2	1	3	6
16	Poland (POL)	1	3	2	6
17	Romania (ROM)	1	3	0	4
18	Japan (JPN)	1	2	4	7
19	Turkey (TUR)	1	2	3	6
20	Sweden (SWE)	1	2	2	5
21	Denmark (DEN)	1	1	1	3
22	Costa Rica (CRC)	1	1	0	2
22	Ireland (IRL)	1	1	0	2
24	Belgium (BEL)	1	0	4	5
25	Puerto Rico (PUR)	1	0	1	2
26	Algeria (ALG)	1	0	0	1
26	Georgia (GEO)	1	0	0	1
26	Mexico (MEX)	1	0	0	1
26	Morocco (MAR)	1	0	0	1
26	Mozambique (MOZ)	1	0	0	1
26	New Zealand (NZL)	1	0	0	1
26	Slovenia (SLO)	1	0	0	1
26	U.S. Virgin Islands (VIR)	1	0	0	1
34	Armenia (ARM)	0	3	0	3
35	Latvia (LAT)	0	2	0	2
35	Nigeria (NGR)	0	2	0	2
37	Australia (AUS)	0	1	3	4
38	Finland (FIN)	0	1	2	3
39	Austria (AUT)	0	1	0	1
39	Brazil (BRA)	0	1	0	1
39	Estonia (EST)	0	1	0	1
39	Iran (IRI)	0	1	0	1
39	Namibia (NAM)	0	1	0	1
39	Portugal (POR)	0	1	0	1
39	Somalia (SOM)	0	1	0	1
39	Zambia (ZAM)	0	1	0	1
47	Uzbekistan (UZB)	0	0	4	4
48	Bulgaria (BUL)	0	0	2	2
48	Hungary (HUN)	0	0	2	2
48	Jamaica (JAM)	0	0	2	2
48	Moldova (MDA)	0	0	2	2
48	Netherlands (NED)	0	0	2	2
48	Slovakia (SVK)	0	0	2	2
54	Egypt (EGY)	0	0	1	1
54	Kazakhstan (KAZ)	0	0	1	1
54	Syria (SYR)	0	0	1	1
Totals (56 entries)		186	175	212	573
