= Dmitri Trush =

Russian gymnast

- Full name: Dmitri Vladimirovich Trush
- Born: February 8, 1973 (age 53) Voronezh, Russia

Gymnastics career
- Discipline: Men's artistic gymnastics
- Country represented: Russia
Medal record
Men's artistic gymnastics
Representing Russia
Olympic Games
| Gold medal – first place | 1996 Atlanta | Team |
Universiade
| Bronze medal – third place | 1993 Buffalo | Rings |

Dmitri Vladimirovich Trush (Russian: Дмитрий Владимирович Труш, pronounced as Troosh; born 8 February 1973 in Voronezh) is a former Olympic gymnast who competed for Russia in the 1996 Olympic Games. He won gold medal in the team competition.

He won a bronze medal on still rings at the 1993 Summer Universiade in Buffalo, New York, United States.

== See also ==
- List of Olympic male artistic gymnasts for Russia
