= Aleksey Voropayev =

Russian artistic gymnast

Alexei Voropaev
- Full name: Alexei Nikolayevich Voropaev
- Born: 23 January 1973 Moscow, Russian SFSR, Soviet Union
- Died: 5 November 2006 (aged 33) Moscow, Russia

Gymnastics career
- Discipline: Men's artistic gymnastics
- Country represented: Russia
- Former countries represented: Soviet Union
Medal record
Representing Soviet Union
World Championships
Gold medal – first place	1991 Indianapolis	Team
Representing Unified Team
Olympics
Gold medal – first place	1992 Barcelona	Team
World Championships
Silver medal – second place	1992 Paris	Parallel bars
Representing Russia
Olympics
Gold medal – first place	1996 Atlanta	Team
World Championships
Silver medal – second place	1994 Brisbane	All-around
Silver medal – second place	1996 San Juan	Floor
Bronze medal – third place	1997 Lausanne	Team

Alexei Nikolayevich Voropaev (Russian: Алексей Николаевич Воропаев; 23 January 1973 – 5 November 2006) was a gymnast who competed for Russia in the two Olympic Games. He won gold medals in the 1992 and 1996 Olympic Games.

== See also ==
- List of Olympic male artistic gymnasts for Russia
