= Alexei Nemov =

Russian artistic gymnast (born 1976)

- Алексей Немов
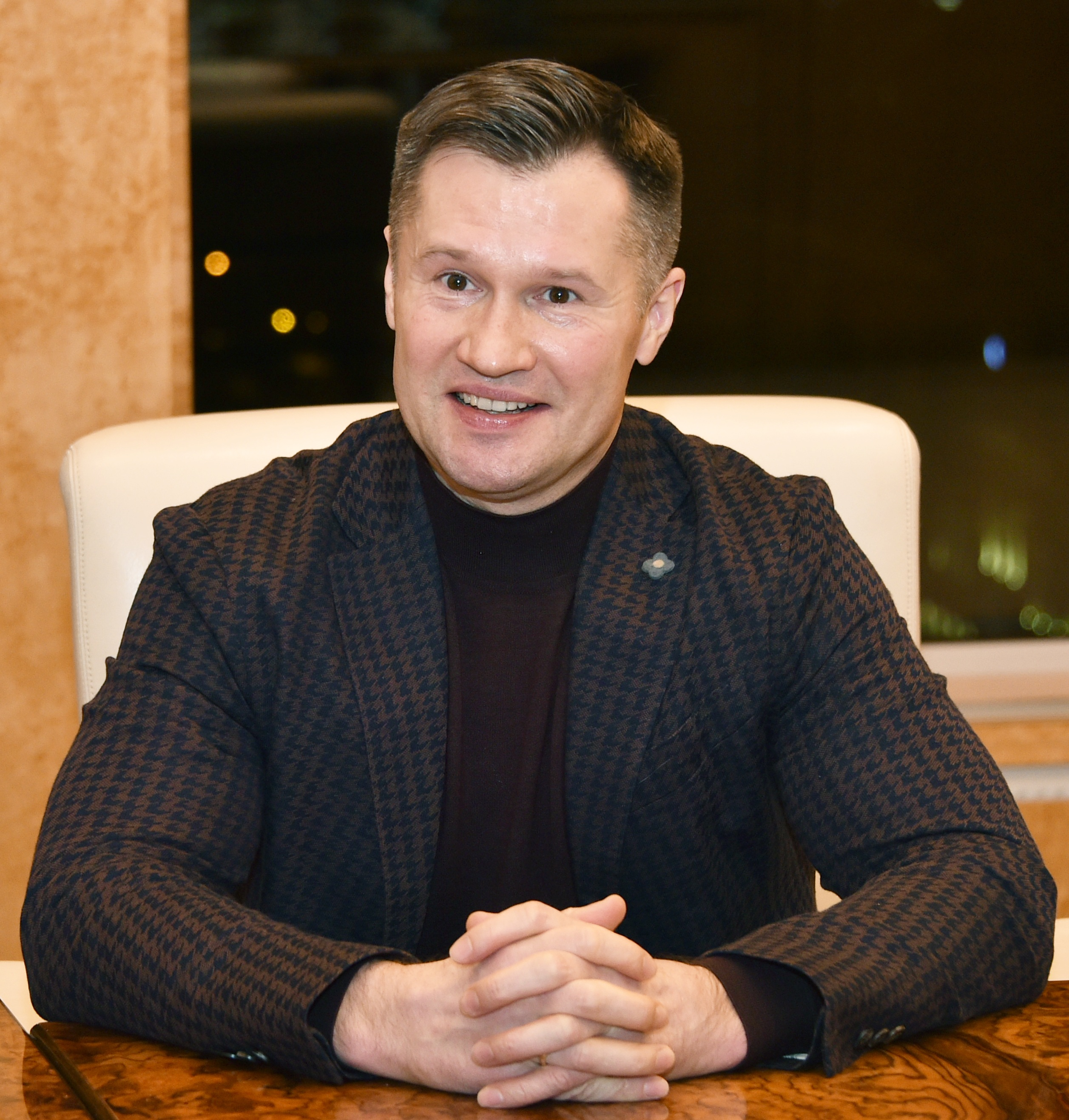

Personal information
- Full name: Alexei Yuryevich Nemov
- Born: 28 May 1976 (age 50) Barashevo, Mordovian ASSR, Russian SFSR, Soviet Union
- Height: 173 cm (5 ft 8 in)

Gymnastics career
- Discipline: Men's artistic gymnastics
- Country represented: Russia (1992–2004)
- Club: Trade Union
- Head coach: Evgeny Nikolko
- Assistant coach: A. Shestakova
- Retired: 2004
Medal record
Olympic Games
Gold medal – first place	1996 Atlanta	Team
Gold medal – first place	1996 Atlanta	Vault
Gold medal – first place	2000 Sydney	All-Around
Gold medal – first place	2000 Sydney	High Bar
Silver medal – second place	1996 Atlanta	All-Around
Silver medal – second place	2000 Sydney	Floor
Bronze medal – third place	1996 Atlanta	Floor
Bronze medal – third place	1996 Atlanta	High Bar
Bronze medal – third place	1996 Atlanta	Pommel Horse
Bronze medal – third place	2000 Sydney	Team
Bronze medal – third place	2000 Sydney	Pommel Horse
Bronze medal – third place	2000 Sydney	Parallel Bars
World Championships
Gold medal – first place	1995 Sabae	Vault
Gold medal – first place	1996 San Juan	Vault
Gold medal – first place	1997 Lausanne	Floor
Gold medal – first place	1999 Tianjin	Floor
Gold medal – first place	1999 Tianjin	Pommel Horse
Silver medal – second place	1994 Dortmund	Team
Silver medal – second place	1996 San Juan	Parallel Bars
Silver medal – second place	1999 Tianjin	Team
Silver medal – second place	2003 Anaheim	Parallel Bars
Bronze medal – third place	1994 Brisbane	Parallel Bars
Bronze medal – third place	1996 San Juan	Pommel Horse
Bronze medal – third place	1997 Lausanne	Team
Bronze medal – third place	2003 Anaheim	High Bar
European Championships
Gold medal – first place	1994 Prague	Parallel Bars
Gold medal – first place	1998 St. Petersburg	Floor
Gold medal – first place	2000 Bremen	Team
Gold medal – first place	2002 Patras	Floor
Silver medal – second place	1994 Prague	Team
Silver medal – second place	1998 St. Petersburg	Team
Silver medal – second place	2002 Patras	Team
Bronze medal – third place	1998 St. Petersburg	All-Around
European Team Championships
Gold medal – first place	1999 Patras	Team
Gold medal – first place	2003 Moscow	Team
- Alexei Nemov's voice Nemov on the Echo of Moscow program, 22 February 2007

Alexei Yuryevich Nemov (Russian: Алексей Юрьевич Немов; born 28 May 1976) is a Russian retired artistic gymnast. During his career, he won five world championships, three European championships and twelve Olympic medals.

== Early life ==
Born in Barashevo, Mordovia, Alexei Nemov grew up in Tolyatti on the Volga River.His father divorced his wife and he lived with his mother in the city of Tolyatti. At the age of six, he began training in artistic gymnastics at the Volga Automobile Plant's specialized children's and youth Olympic reserve school in Tolyatti. He attended School No. 34. Since 1983, he has been training with Yevgeny Grigoryevich Nikolko, a Master of Sports in gymnastics and Honored Coach of Russia. In 1999, he graduated from Tolyatti State University (until 2001, the Tolyatti branch of Samara State Pedagogical University).

== Gymnastics career ==
Nemov made his debut at the 1993 World Championships at the age of sixteen, placing fifth in the floor event. The following year, he stamped himself as a true all-around contender, winning his qualifying session at the Worlds. He later faltered and dropped to twelfth overall. He won his first major all-around title at the Goodwill Games in Saint-Petersburg, beating his second-place teammate and World Silver Medalist Aleksei Voropaev by over one point. Nemov's style of gymnastics was considered very well-rounded; he had complex acrobatics, a unique style, and elegance when he performed.

Despite his initial promising success internationally, by 1995 Nemov had gained a reputation for having inconsistent performances. In the all-around at the 1995 European Cup, Nemov, then 19, was the leader after five events and had put up the high score on three events. When he came to high bar, he only needed an 8.75 to win the title. He missed his two major release moves and crashed into the bar on another, botched a required element, and stopped in the middle of his routine. He scored a 7.35 and dropped to ninth overall.

A few months later, Nemov competed in the World Championships in Sabae, Japan. The Russian team had an extremely poor showing during the qualifying round, finishing in 11th place, with Nemov in 96th position all-around. The team rebounded in the finals to finish 4th overall (still a disappointment since it marked the first time in decades that the Russians failed to medal in the team competition), while Nemov put up the highest optional score of all the competitors.

At the 1996 Olympics in Atlanta, Nemov seemed poised to win the gold. Nemov won six medals (two gold, one silver, and three bronze). He performed solidly in the all-around, battling World Champion Li Xiaoshuang every step of the way. Nemov ruined his chances for gold, however, when he botched his middle tumbling run in the final event, finishing second by a narrow margin.

While many questioned Nemov's dedication and fitness level, he continued to excel. Several shoulder injuries, as well as his marriage and the birth of his first son, along with perceived inconsistencies in character were cited as evidence of weak gymnastics prior to the 2000 Sydney Olympics. This led to increased concerns about Aleksei's lack of a major title. However, as a high-performance athlete, Nemov went into the 2000 Olympics in the best shape of his life – having never seen his newborn son (born in September 2000), and was able to take home to his son what he called a golden rattle, in reality an all-around gold medal. Except for still rings, he had won at least one Olympic medal in every other discipline of men's gymnastics by the end of the Sydney games.

=== 2004 Olympics controversy and rule change ===
Although injury took its toll, Nemov competed through to the 2004 Athens Olympics, mainly as an anchor for the fledgling Russian team. Though unable to defend his all-around title, Nemov's performances brought the house down on high bar in Athens and placed him in the middle of a judging controversy. After performing a routine with six release skills in the high bar event final (including four in a row – three variations of Tkatchev releases and a Gienger), the judges posted a score of 9.725, placing him in third position with several athletes still to compete. The crowd became unruly on seeing the results and interrupted the competition for almost fifteen minutes. Influenced by the crowd's fierce reaction, the judges reevaluated the routine and increased Nemov's score to 9.762, but this did not improve his placement and he finished without a medal. The crowd's reaction, even to this new score, was so strong that the next competitor, Paul Hamm, was not given the green light to compete. At the request of officials, Nemov stepped onto the podium and gestured to the audience to ask them to quiet down. For this act of sportsmanship he received the 2005 Fair Play Award from the International Fair Play Committee.

This scandal was just the latest of several judging disputes in the competition, such as the scoring controversy involving Korean gymnast Yang Tae-Young, and prompted a major reconstruction of the gymnastics scoring system, which was implemented in 2006. The rule changes are credited as having encouraged more acrobatic activity and increasing difficulties on the high bar apparatus seen in later competitions. The Russian Olympic Committee later awarded Nemov $40,000 in recognition of his character, and he retired from gymnastics soon after.

== Personal life ==
Nemov currently lives in his hometown of Tolyatti with his wife Galina and his son Alexei (born 2000) and his other son Dima (born 2009).

In 2015, he was awarded the rank of reserve colonel in the Russian Armed Forces by Minister of Defense Sergey Shoigu for his achievements in sports and service to the country.

In 2022, after the International Gymnastics Federation opened a disciplinary case against Ivan Kuliak for wearing the military symbol "Z" (used by Russian invading forces in Ukraine) at an international gymnastics medal ceremony, Nemov expressed support for him, saying that Kuliak had been "provoked" and that his actions showed "courage".

== See also ==
- List of multiple Olympic gold medalists
- List of multiple Olympic medalists
- List of multiple Summer Olympic medalists
- List of multiple Olympic medalists at a single Games
- List of Olympic medal leaders in men's gymnastics
- List of Olympic male artistic gymnasts for Russia
