= 1993 World Artistic Gymnastics Championships =

Gymnastics competition

- Venue: National Exhibition Centre
- Location: (United Kingdom) Birmingham, Great Britain
- Start date: 13 April 1993
- End date: 18 April 1993

The 1993 World Artistic Gymnastics Championships were held in Birmingham, Great Britain. There was no team competition at this meet; gymnasts competed in the all-around and event finals only.

The opening ceremony took place on 12 April at the National Indoor Arena, and the competition took place from 13–18 April at the National Exhibition Centre. Fifty-seven nations participated, more than at any previous edition of the World Artistic Gymnastics Championships. The member states of the Soviet Union competed under their own flags for the first time.

This was the first world championships to allow only 24 gymnasts in the all-around final, with 2 gymnasts per nation instead of 3. This format returned at the 2003 World Championships and has remained ever since.

== Medallists ==
Event	Gold	Silver	Bronze
Men
Individual all-around	(Belarus) Vitaly Scherbo	(Russia) Sergey Kharkov	(Germany) Andreas Wecker
Floor	(Ukraine) Hrihoriy Misyutin	(Belarus) Vitaly Scherbo (United Kingdom) Neil Thomas	none awarded
Pommel horse	(North Korea) Pae Gil-su	(Germany) Andreas Wecker	(Hungary) Károly Schupkégel
Rings	(Italy) Jury Chechi	(Germany) Andreas Wecker	(Belarus) Ivan Ivankov
Vault	(Belarus) Vitaly Scherbo	(Chinese Taipei) Chang Feng-chih	(South Korea) Yoo Ok-ryul
Parallel bars	(Belarus) Vitaly Scherbo	(Ukraine) Ihor Korobchynskyi	(International Olympic Committee) Valery Belenky*
Horizontal bar	(Russia) Sergey Kharkov	(Romania) Marius Gherman	(Hungary) Zoltán Supola
Women
Individual all-around	(United States) Shannon Miller	(Romania) Gina Gogean	(Ukraine) Tatiana Lysenko
Vault	(Belarus) Elena Piskun	(Romania) Lavinia Miloșovici	(Uzbekistan) Oksana Chusovitina
Uneven bars	(United States) Shannon Miller	(United States) Dominique Dawes	(Romania) Andreea Cacovean
Balance beam	(Romania) Lavinia Miloșovici	(United States) Dominique Dawes	(Romania) Gina Gogean
Floor	(United States) Shannon Miller	(Romania) Gina Gogean	(Russia) Natalia Bobrova

* Because Belenky's home country, Azerbaijan, did not have a gymnastics federation, he competed at this event as an independent (UNA) athlete.

== Medals ==
=== Overall ===
Rank	Nation	Gold	Silver	Bronze	Total
1	Belarus (BLR)	4	1	1	6
2	United States (USA)	3	2	0	5
3	Romania (ROU)	1	4	2	7
4	Russia (RUS)	1	1	1	3
4	Ukraine (UKR)	1	1	1	3
6	Italy (ITA)	1	0	0	1
6	North Korea (PRK)	1	0	0	1
8	Germany (GER)	0	2	1	3
9	Chinese Taipei (TPE)	0	1	0	1
9	Great Britain (GBR)	0	1	0	1
11	Hungary (HUN)	0	0	2	2
12	International Olympic Committee (IOC)	0	0	1	1
12	South Korea (KOR)	0	0	1	1
12	Uzbekistan (UZB)	0	0	1	1
Totals (14 entries)		12	13	11	36

=== Men ===
Rank	Nation	Gold	Silver	Bronze	Total
1	Belarus (BLR)	3	1	1	5
2	Russia (RUS)	1	1	0	2
2	Ukraine	1	1	0	2
4	Italy	1	0	0	1
4	North Korea	1	0	0	1
6	Germany	0	2	1	3
7	Chinese Taipei	0	1	0	1
7	Great Britain	0	1	0	1
7	Romania	0	1	0	1
10	Hungary	0	0	2	2
11	International Olympic Committee	0	0	1	1
11	South Korea	0	0	1	1
Totals (12 entries)		7	8	6	21

=== Women ===
Rank	Nation	Gold	Silver	Bronze	Total
1	United States	3	2	0	5
2	Romania	1	3	2	6
3	Belarus (BLR)	1	0	0	1
4	Russia (RUS)	0	0	1	1
4	Ukraine	0	0	1	1
4	Uzbekistan	0	0	1	1
Totals (6 entries)		5	5	5	15

== Participants ==
=== Men ===
Country	Gymnast
Argentina	Sebastián Álvarez
Argentina	Fernando Menghi
Argentina	Gustavo Pisos
Armenia	Achot Gasparian
Armenia	Vakhtang Movsesian
Armenia	Norair Sarkisian
Australia	Brennon Dowrick
Australia	Peter Hogan
Australia	Bret Hudson
Austria	Catalin Mircan
Austria	Thomas Zimmermann
Belarus (BLR)	Ivan Ivankov
Belarus (BLR)	Andrey Kan
Belarus (BLR)	Vitaly Scherbo
Belgium	Laurent Jonas
Belgium	Jurgen van Eetvelt
Bolivia	Ignacio Morales
Bulgaria	Krasimir Dunev
Bulgaria	Ivan Ivanov
Bulgaria	Yordan Yovchev
Canada	Kris Burley
Canada	Curtis Hibbert
Canada	Richard Ikeda
China	Huang Huadong
China	Huang Liping
China	Wang Feng
Chinese Taipei	Chang Feng-chih
Chinese Taipei	Chen Dong-jiang
Chinese Taipei	Chen Jia-lin
Cuba	Erick López
Cuba	Irving Torres
Czech Republic	Arnold Bugár
Czech Republic	Martin Riesner
Czech Republic	Miroslav Smetana
Denmark	Rasmus Brandtoft
Denmark	Kaspar Fardan
Dominican Republic	Geraldo Sánchez
Dominican Republic	Milciades Santiago
Ecuador	Manuel Rojas
Finland	Joni Koivunen
Finland	Jari Monkkonen
Finland	Jani Winterhalter
France	Fabrice Guelzec
France	Jean-Claude Legros
France	Éric Poujade
Georgia (GEO)	Vladimir Gogoladze
Georgia (GEO)	Nugzar Gviniashvili
Georgia (GEO)	Levan Sisauri
Germany	Jörg Behrend
Germany	Jan-Peter Nikiferow
Germany	Andreas Wecker
Greece	Ioannis Melissanidis
Greece	Georgios Papadimakis
Greece	Stauros Tsiaglis
Hungary	Csaba Fajkusz
Hungary	Károly Schupkégel
Hungary	Zoltán Supola
India	Rajesh Kumar
India	Debnath Ratan
India	Vikas Sabharwal
Israel	Ron Kaplan
Italy	Paolo Bucci
Italy	Jury Chechi
Italy	Boris Preti
Japan	Takashi Chinen
Japan	Daisuke Nishikawa
Japan	Hikaru Tanaka
Kazakhstan	Sergey Fedorchenko
Kazakhstan	Valeri Liukin
Kazakhstan	Dmitry Rybalko
Mexico	Francisco López
Mexico	José Solano
Morocco	Eddyanne Abdelwahed
Morocco	Alaoui Driss
Morocco	Sader Khalid
Netherlands	Alexander Selk
Netherlands	Christian Selk
North Korea	Pae Gil-su
North Korea	Kim Sok-chol
Norway	Espen Jansen
Norway	Flemming Solberg
Portugal	João Chu
Portugal	Hélder Pinheiro
Puerto Rico	Carlos Latorre
Puerto Rico	Diego Lizardi
Puerto Rico	Pedro Tort
Romania	Dan Burincă
Romania	Alexandru Ciuca
Romania	Marius Gherman
Russia (RUS)	Dimitri Karbanenko
Russia (RUS)	Sergey Kharkov
Russia (RUS)	Alexei Nemov
Slovenia	Enis Hodzic
Slovenia	Dejan Ločnikar
Slovenia	Aljaž Pegan
South Africa	Anton Goldman
South Africa	Adrian Steyn
South Africa	Johan van Heerden
South Korea	Chung Jin-soo
South Korea	Yoo Ok-ryul
South Korea	Han Yun-su
Spain	Alberto Bravo
Spain	Antonio Fernández
Spain	Francisco Merchan
Sweden	Per Brändström
Sweden	Jorgen Jonasson
Sweden	Andreas Jonsson
Switzerland	Daniel Giubellini
Switzerland	Oliver Grimm
Switzerland	Rene Pluss
Thailand	Valsang Amornthep
Thailand	Puangmanee Taweesak
Ukraine	Ihor Korobchynskyi
Ukraine	Hrihoriy Misyutin
Ukraine	Rustam Sharipov
International Olympic Committee (IOC)	Valery Belenky*
Great Britain	Paul Bowler
Great Britain	Marvin Campbell
Great Britain	Neil Thomas
United States	Scott Keswick
United States	Lance Ringnald
United States	Chris Waller
Uzbekistan	Khikmatoulla Tokhtaev

* Because Belenky's home country, Azerbaijan, did not have a gymnastics federation, he competed at this meet as an unattached (UNA) athlete.

=== Women ===
Country	Gymnast
Argentina	Vanessa Baglietti
Argentina	Luciana Peirano
Austria	Liane Zürcher
Belarus (BLR)	Oksana Kozhedub
Belarus (BLR)	Elena Piskun
Belarus (BLR)	Yulia Yurkina
Belgium	Bénédicte Evrard
Brazil	Soraya Carvalho
Bulgaria	Svetlana Ivanova
Bulgaria	Mirela Peneva
Bulgaria	Deliana Vodenicharova
Canada	Marilou Cousineau
Canada	Stacey Galloway
Canada	Stella Umeh
China	Li Li
China	Ye Linlin
China	He Xuemei
Chinese Taipei	Tsai Shu-huei
Chinese Taipei	Wu Ruey-ping
Cuba	Arazay Jova
Cuba	Annia Portuondo
Czech Republic	Pavla Kinclová
Czech Republic	Klára Kudilková
Denmark	Charlotte Andreasen
Denmark	Annika Hansen
Estonia	Jekaterina Savenkova
Estonia	Jelena Selivanova
Estonia	Veronika Tsubarko
Finland	Sari Lehmuskallio
Finland	Niina Parjanen
Finland	Leena-Kaisa Piiroinen
France	Eleonore Couffe
France	Mélanie Legros
Germany	Jana Günther
Germany	Gabriele Weller
Greece	Virginia Karentzou
Greece	Sofia Pidoula
Guatemala	Luisa Portocarrero
Hungary	Kinga Horváth
Hungary	Andrea Molnár
Hungary	Krisztina Molnár
Israel	Einat Kedar
Israel	Maya Shani
Italy	Chiara Ferrazzi
Italy	Veronica Servente
Japan	Yuka Arai
Japan	Mari Kosuge
Japan	Risa Sugawara
Kazakhstan	Olga Kim
Kazakhstan	Viktoria Pavlova
Kazakhstan	Irina Yevdokimova
Latvia	Ludmila Prince
Mexico	Judith Cavazos
Mexico	Laura del Carmen Moreno
Morocco	Naima El-Rhouati
Morocco	Sanae Khadiri
Netherlands	Wyke Karten
Netherlands	Monique Slootmaker
Norway	Annette Pettersen
Norway	Anita Tomulevski
Poland	Aleksandra Szczesiul
Puerto Rico	Nanette Berrios
Puerto Rico	Francine Díaz
Puerto Rico	Yariza Yulian
Romania	Andreea Cacovean
Romania	Gina Gogean
Romania	Lavinia Miloșovici
Russia	Natalia Bobrova
Russia	Oksana Fabrichnova
Slovakia	Klaudia Kinská
Slovenia	Lidija Perić
Slovenia	Nataša Retelj
South Africa	Kirsty McClelland
South Africa	Heidi Oosthuizen
South Africa	Leigh Pra-Levis
South Korea	Han Na-jung
South Korea	Heo So-young
South Korea	Lee Soo-young
Spain	Mercedes Pacheco
Spain	Silvia Santiago
Spain	Elisabeth Valle
Sweden	Jessica Andreasson
Switzerland	Patricia Giacomini
Switzerland	Tanja Pechstein
Switzerland	Natascha Schnell
Ukraine	Tatiana Lysenko
Ukraine	Lilia Podkopayeva
Ukraine	Ludmila Stovbchataya
United Kingdom	Jackie Brady
United Kingdom	Zita Lusack
United Kingdom	Laura Timmins
United States	Dominique Dawes
United States	Shannon Miller
United States	Kerri Strug
Uzbekistan	Oksana Chusovitina
Uzbekistan	Rozalia Galiyeva
Uzbekistan	Snezhana Manakova

== Men's results ==
=== All-around ===
Rank	Gymnast	Floor (gymnastics)	Pommel horse	Rings (gymnastics)	Vault (gymnastics)	Parallel bars	Horizontal bar	Total
1st place, gold medalist(s)	Vitaly Scherbo (BLR)	9.325	9.350	9.125	9.537	9.462	9.375	56.174
2nd place, silver medalist(s)	Sergey Kharkov (RUS)	9.200	9.075	9.375	9.150	9.450	9.375	55.625
3rd place, bronze medalist(s)	Andreas Wecker (GER)	9.175	9.275	9.500	9.225	9.250	9.025	55.450
4	Ivan Ivankov (BLR)	9.000	9.275	9.325	9.375	9.250	9.200	55.425
5	Dmitri Karbanenko (RUS)	9.300	9.350	8.875	9.525	9.375	8.850	55.275
6	Valeri Liukin (KAZ)	8.925	9.225	9.350	9.350	9.100	9.275	55.255
6	(International Olympic Committee) Valery Belenky (UNA)	9.125	9.300	9.300	9.175	9.375	8.950	55.255
8	Ihor Korobchynskyi (UKR)	9.250	9.250	9.075	8.875	9.450	9.200	55.100
9	Scott Keswick (USA)	8.950	9.000	9.325	8.925	9.225	9.450	54.875
10	Jury Chechi (ITA)	8.950	9.175	9.612	9.050	8.925	9.250	54.737
11	Csaba Fajkusz (HUN)	8.950	9.175	8.925	9.100	9.075	9.100	54.350
12	Hrihoriy Misyutin (UKR)	9.375	9.275	9.150	9.550	8.325	8.575	54.250
13	Zoltán Supola (HUN)	8.800	8.450	9.150	9.300	9.250	9.225	54.175
13	Huang Huadong (CHN)	8.850	9.400	8.550	9.200	9.050	9.125	54.175
15	Marius Gherman (ROU)	9.125	8.625	8.625	9.450	8.925	9.350	54.100
16	Hikaru Tanaka (JPN)	9.100	9.300	8.925	9.175	9.075	8.475	54.050
17	Paolo Bucci (ITA)	9.025	9.075	8.900	9.075	8.850	9.000	53.925
18	Yordan Yovchev (BUL)	8.925	8.950	8.925	9.200	9.100	8.550	53.650
19	Alexandru Ciuca (ROU)	8.800	9.400	8.875	8.950	8.875	8.675	53.575
20	Ivan Ivanov (BUL)	9.200	8.925	8.825	9.200	8.825	8.425	53.400
21	Daniel Giubellini (SUI)	8.775	8.600	8.750	9.100	8.950	9.000	53.175
22	Dmitry Rybalko (KAZ)	8.550	8.125	8.775	9.150	8.750	9.225	52.575
23	Jan-Peter Nikiferow (GER)	7.900	9.200	8.950	8.850	8.150	9.025	52.075
24	Pae Gil-su (PRK)	7.950	9.762	8.750	9.200	8.175	7.725	51.562

=== Floor exercise ===
Rank	Gymnast	Total
1st place, gold medalist(s)	Hrihoriy Misyutin (UKR)	9.400
2nd place, silver medalist(s)	Vitaly Scherbo (BLR)	9.350
2nd place, silver medalist(s)	Neil Thomas (GBR)	9.350
4	Ihor Korobchynskyi (UKR)	9.275
5	Ivan Ivankov (BLR)	9.150
5	Marius Gherman (ROU)	9.150
5	Alexei Nemov (RUS)	9.150
8	Ivan Ivanov (BUL)	8.750

=== Pommel horse ===
Rank	Gymnast	Total
1st place, gold medalist(s)	Pae Gil-su (PRK)	9.750
2nd place, silver medalist(s)	Andreas Wecker (GER)	9.425
3rd place, bronze medalist(s)	Károly Schupkégel (HUN)	9.400
4	Valeri Liukin (KAZ)	9.350
5	Huang Liping (CHN)	9.225
6	Chris Waller (USA)	8.650
7	Alexandru Ciuca (ROU)	8.575
8	Vitaly Scherbo (BLR)	8.125

=== Rings ===
Rank	Gymnast	Total
1st place, gold medalist(s)	Jury Chechi (ITA)	9.625
2nd place, silver medalist(s)	Andreas Wecker (GER)	9.575
3rd place, bronze medalist(s)	Ivan Ivankov (BLR)	9.500
4	Valeri Liukin (KAZ)	9.475
5	Dan Burincă (ROU)	9.400
5	Rustam Sharipov (UKR)	9.400
7	Scott Keswick (USA)	9.300
8	Yoo Ok-ryul (KOR)	9.125

=== Vault ===
Rank	Gymnast	Vault 1	Vault 2	Total
1st place, gold medalist(s)	Vitaly Scherbo (BLR)	9.662	9.562	9.612
2nd place, silver medalist(s)	Chang Feng-chih (TPE)	9.450	9.525	9.487
3rd place, bronze medalist(s)	Yoo Ok-ryul (KOR)	9.512	9.325	9.418
4	Wang Feng (CHN)	9.425	9.325	9.375
5	Sergey Kharkov (RUS)	9.525	9.100	9.312
6	Valeri Liukin (KAZ)	9.250	9.325	9.287
7	Erick López (CUB)	8.850	9.375	9.112
8	(International Olympic Committee) Valery Belenky (UNA)	9.225	8.925	9.075

=== Parallel bars ===
Rank	Gymnast	Total
1st place, gold medalist(s)	Vitaly Scherbo (BLR)	9.600
2nd place, silver medalist(s)	Ihor Korobchynskyi (UKR)	9.525
3rd place, bronze medalist(s)	(International Olympic Committee) Valery Belenky (UNA)	9.475
4	Rustam Sharipov (UKR)	9.450
5	Andrey Kan (BLR)	9.350
6	Dimitri Karbanenko (RUS)	9.050
7	Sergey Kharkov (RUS)	8.700
8	Huang Huadong (CHN)	8.650

=== Horizontal bar ===
Rank	Gymnast	Total
1st place, gold medalist(s)	Sergey Kharkov (RUS)	9.450
2nd place, silver medalist(s)	Marius Gherman (ROU)	9.375
3rd place, bronze medalist(s)	Zoltán Supola (HUN)	9.350
4	Vitaly Scherbo (BLR)	9.325
4	Rustam Sharipov (UKR)	9.325
6	Ihor Korobchynskyi (UKR)	9.250
7	Scott Keswick (USA)	8.900
8	Dimitri Karbanenko (RUS)	8.325

== Women's results ==
=== All-around ===
Rank	Gymnast	Vault (gymnastics)	Uneven bars	Balance beam	Floor (gymnastics)	Total
1st place, gold medalist(s)	Shannon Miller (USA)	9.787	9.825	9.625	9.825	39.062
2nd place, silver medalist(s)	Gina Gogean (ROU)	9.718	9.812	9.725	9.800	39.055
3rd place, bronze medalist(s)	Tatiana Lysenko (UKR)	9.824	9.725	9.712	9.750	39.011
4	Dominique Dawes (USA)	9.493	9.762	9.775	9.800	38.830
5	Oksana Fabrichnova (RUS)	9.643	9.712	9.750	9.525	38.630
6	Rozalia Galiyeva (UZB)	9.599	9.775	9.575	9.637	38.586
7	Elena Piskun (BLR)	9.718	9.487	9.787	9.562	38.554
8	Lavinia Miloșovici (ROU)	9.756	9.512	9.337	9.787	38.392
9	Li Li (CHN)	9.543	9.600	9.837	9.250	38.230
10	Annia Portuondo (CUB)	9.637	9.612	9.412	9.537	38.198
11	Andrea Molnár (HUN)	9.637	9.487	9.325	9.600	38.049
12	Luisa Portocarrero (GUA)	9.493	9.575	9.225	9.475	37.768
13	Eleonore Couffe (FRA)	9.549	9.437	9.137	9.612	37.735
14	Ludmila Stovbchataya (UKR)	9.468	8.812	9.600	9.775	37.655
15	Stella Umeh (CAN)	9.637	9.300	8.937	9.700	37.574
16	Yulia Yurkina (BLR)	9.568	9.287	9.087	9.587	37.529
17	Ludmila Prince (LAT)	9.468	9.025	9.612	9.225	37.330
18	Oksana Chusovitina (UZB)	9.581	8.912	9.050	9.662	37.205
19	Natalia Bobrova (RUS)	9.300	9.262	8.612	9.800	36.974
20	Mari Kosuge (JPN)	9.468	9.550	8.887	9.250	36.930
21	Stacey Galloway (CAN)	9.568	9.275	8.750	9.325	36.918
22	Bénédicte Evrard (BEL)	9.425	9.237	8.525	9.475	36.662
23	Krisztina Molnár (HUN)	9.368	8.637	8.862	8.687	35.554
24	He Xuemei (CHN)	4.725	9.575	9.375	9.187	32.862

=== Vault ===
Rank	Gymnast	Vault 1	Vault 2	Total
1st place, gold medalist(s)	Elena Piskun (BLR)	9.837	9.687	9.762
2nd place, silver medalist(s)	Lavinia Miloșovici (ROU)	9.700	9.775	9.737
3rd place, bronze medalist(s)	Oksana Chusovitina (UZB)	9.750	9.687	9.718
4	Gina Gogean (ROU)	9.750	9.625	9.687
5	Kerri Strug (USA)	9.775	9.550	9.662
6	Klára Kudilková (TCH)	9.587	9.437	9.512
7	Arazay Jova (CUB)	8.925	9.762	9.343
8	Lilia Podkopayeva (UKR)	8.225	9.562	8.893

=== Uneven bars ===
Rank	Gymnast	S.V.	Total
1st place, gold medalist(s)	Shannon Miller (USA)	10.0	9.887
2nd place, silver medalist(s)	Dominique Dawes (USA)	10.0	9.800
3rd place, bronze medalist(s)	Andreea Cacovean (ROU)	10.0	9.787
4	He Xuemei (CHN)	10.0	9.712
5	Lavinia Miloșovici (ROU)	9.9	9.500
5	Annia Portuondo (CUB)	9.8	9.500
5	Tatiana Lysenko (UKR)	9.7	9.500
8	Oksana Chusovitina (UZB)	9.9	8.325

=== Balance beam ===
Rank	Gymnast	S.V	pen.	Total
1st place, gold medalist(s)	Lavinia Miloșovici (ROU)	10.0		9.850
2nd place, silver medalist(s)	Dominique Dawes (USA)	9.9		9.725
3rd place, bronze medalist(s)	Gina Gogean (ROU)	9.8		9.650
4	Li Li (CHN)	10.0	0.2	9.600
5	Ludmila Prince (LAT)	9.8		9.475
6	Oksana Fabrichnova (RUS)	9.9		9.212
7	He Xuemei (CHN)	9.8		9.012
8	Shannon Miller (USA)	9.5		7.850

=== Floor exercise ===
Rank	Gymnast	S.V.	Total
1st place, gold medalist(s)	Shannon Miller (USA)	9.9	9.787
2nd place, silver medalist(s)	Gina Gogean (ROU)	9.9	9.737
3rd place, bronze medalist(s)	Natalia Bobrova (RUS)	10.0	9.712
4	Elena Piskun (BLR)	9.9	9.687
5	Lavinia Miloșovici (ROU)	9.8	9.675
6	Kerri Strug (USA)	9.8	9.587
7	Irina Yevdokimova (KAZ)	9.8	9.462
8	Stella Umeh (CAN)	9.6	9.237
