= 1994 World Artistic Gymnastics Championships =

Gymnastics competition

Coordinates: 27.468°S 153.028°E

- Location: Brisbane, Australia
- Start date: 19 April 1994
- End date: 24 April 1994

The 1994 World Artistic Gymnastics Championships were held in Brisbane, Australia, from 19–24 April 1994.

Only the all-around and apparatus events were contested at this meet. A team World Championships meet was held in Dortmund, Germany, in November 1994.This was the only year in history that the gymnastics world championships were held in separate venues due to a test of a new competition format.

== Results ==
Event	Gold	Silver	Bronze
Men
Individual all-around	(Belarus) Ivan Ivankov	(Russia) Aleksey Voropayev	(Belarus) Vitaly Scherbo
Floor exercise	(Belarus) Vitaly Scherbo	(United Kingdom) Neil Thomas (Greece) Ioannis Melissanidis	none awarded
Pommel horse	(Romania) Marius Urzică	(France) Éric Poujade	(Switzerland) Li Donghua (Ukraine) Vitaly Marinich
Rings	(Italy) Jury Chechi	(United States) Paul O'Neill	(Germany) Valery Belenky (Romania) Dan Burincă
Vault	(Belarus) Vitaly Scherbo	(China) Li Xiaoshuang	(South Korea) Yeo Hong-chul
Parallel bars	(China) Huang Liping	(Ukraine) Rustam Sharipov	(Russia) Alexei Nemov
Horizontal bar	(Belarus) Vitaly Scherbo	(Hungary) Zoltán Supola	(Belarus) Ivan Ivankov
Women
Individual all-around	(United States) Shannon Miller	(Romania) Lavinia Miloșovici	(Russia) Dina Kochetkova
Vault	(Romania) Gina Gogean	(Russia) Svetlana Khorkina	(Romania) Lavinia Miloșovici
Uneven bars	(China) Luo Li	(Russia) Svetlana Khorkina	(Russia) Dina Kochetkova
Balance beam	(United States) Shannon Miller	(Ukraine) Lilia Podkopayeva	(Russia) Oksana Fabrichnova
Floor exercise	(Russia) Dina Kochetkova	(Romania) Lavinia Miloșovici	(Romania) Gina Gogean

== Medal table ==
=== Overall ===
Rank	Nation	Gold	Silver	Bronze	Total
1	Belarus (BLR)	4	0	2	6
2	Romania (ROU)	2	2	3	7
3	China (CHN)	2	1	0	3
3	United States (USA)	2	1	0	3
5	Russia (RUS)	1	3	4	8
6	Italy (ITA)	1	0	0	1
7	Ukraine (UKR)	0	2	1	3
8	France (FRA)	0	1	0	1
8	Great Britain (GBR)	0	1	0	1
8	Greece (GRE)	0	1	0	1
8	Hungary (HUN)	0	1	0	1
12	Germany (GER)	0	0	1	1
12	South Korea (KOR)	0	0	1	1
12	Switzerland (SUI)	0	0	1	1
Totals (14 entries)		12	13	13	38

=== Men ===
Rank	Nation	Gold	Silver	Bronze	Total
1	Belarus (BLR)	4	0	2	6
2	China	1	1	0	2
3	Romania	1	0	1	2
4	Italy	1	0	0	1
5	Russia	0	1	1	2
5	Ukraine	0	1	1	2
7	France	0	1	0	1
7	Great Britain	0	1	0	1
7	Greece	0	1	0	1
7	Hungary	0	1	0	1
7	United States	0	1	0	1
12	Germany	0	0	1	1
12	South Korea	0	0	1	1
12	Switzerland	0	0	1	1
Totals (14 entries)		7	8	8	23

=== Women ===
Rank	Nation	Gold	Silver	Bronze	Total
1	United States	2	0	0	2
2	Russia	1	2	3	6
3	Romania	1	2	2	5
4	China	1	0	0	1
5	Ukraine	0	1	0	1
Totals (5 entries)		5	5	5	15

== Participants ==
=== Men ===
Country	Gymnast
Argentina	Sebastián Álvarez
Argentina	Sergio Alvarino
Argentina	Isidro Ibarrondo
Argentina	Fernando Menghi
Australia	Damien Crozier
Australia	Brennon Dowrick
Australia	Peter Hogan
Australia	Bret Hudson
Australia	Nathan Kingston
Australia	Brendan Mand
Austria	Catalin Mircan
Austria	Martin Staudacher
Austria	Thomas Zimmermann
Belarus	Ivan Ivankov
Belarus	Ivan Pavlovsky
Belarus	Vitaly Scherbo
Belgium	Pierre-Yves Lequeux
Belgium	Tanguy Nuyts
Belgium	Jurgen van Eetvelt
Belgium	Luk van Gompel
Bolivia	Ignacio Morales
Brazil	Jose Mario Barbuto
Brazil	Gilberto da Silva
Brazil	Marco Monteiro
Brazil	Kleber Sato
Bulgaria	Ivan Aleksov
Bulgaria	Krasimir Dunev
Bulgaria	Kalofer Hristozov
Bulgaria	Ivan Ivanov
Bulgaria	Yordan Yovchev
Canada	Darren Bersuk
Canada	Kris Burley
Canada	Richard Ikeda
Canada	Alan Nolet
Canada	Travis Romagnoli
Canada	Peter Schmidt
China	Guo Linyao
China	Huang Huadong
China	Huang Liping
China	Li Dashuang
China	Li Jing
China	Li Xiaoshuang
Chinese Taipei	Chang Feng-chih
Chinese Taipei	Chen Han-ting
Chinese Taipei	Cheng Kun-chieh
Chinese Taipei	Wu Chin-chan
Croatia	Ratko Jovanović
Croatia	Dalibor Kovačić
Croatia	Lucijan Krce
Croatia	Miroslav Palmović
Croatia	Saša Solar
Cyprus	Andreas Kousios
Czech Republic	Milan Krejci
Czech Republic	Peter Novac
Czech Republic	Martin Riesner
Czech Republic	Miroslav Smetana
Czech Republic	Tomáš Tvrdý
Denmark	Rasmus Brandtoft
El Salvador	Carlos Baltazar Rosales
El Salvador	Enrique Trabanino
Finland	Riku Koivunen
Finland	Jari Monkkonen
Finland	Jiri Nurmi
Finland	Jani Tanskanen
Finland	Jani Winterhalter
France	Patrice Casimir
France	Éric Poujade
Germany	Valery Belenky
Germany	Ralf Büchner
Germany	Mario Franke
Germany	Jan-Peter Nikiferow
Germany	Oliver Walther
Germany	Andreas Wecker
Greece	Nikolaos Kentimenos
Greece	Nikolaos Kosmas
Greece	Ioannis Melissanidis
Greece	Georgios Papadimakis
Greece	Dimosthenis Tampakos
Hungary	Szilveszter Csollány
Hungary	Csaba Fajkusz
Hungary	Zoltán Supola
Indonesia	Khaerudin Pasaribu
Indonesia	Jonathan Sianturi
Indonesia	Ujung Sutrisno
Israel	Ron Kaplan
Italy	Jury Chechi
Italy	Andrea Massucchi
Italy	Boris Preti
Japan	Yoshiaki Hatakeda
Japan	Shigeru Kurihara
Japan	Daisuke Nishikawa
Japan	Masanori Suzuki
Japan	Hikaru Tanaka
Japan	Shinya Watanabe
Kazakhstan	Sergey Fedorchenko
Kazakhstan	Dmitry Rybalko
Lithuania	Kirilas Vorona
Lithuania	Viktoras Sidorovas
Mexico	Carlos García
Mexico	Francisco López
Mexico	Alejandro Peniche
Mexico	Humberto Pérez
Mexico	Andreas Sánchez
Mexico	José Solano
Netherlands	Alexander Selk
Netherlands	Christian Selk
New Zealand	Craig Bruce
Nigeria	Innocent Eragbhe
Nigeria	Kingsley Eragbhe
Nigeria	Cletus Okpoh
Norway	Espen Jansen
Norway	Tor Einar Refsnes
Norway	Flemming Solberg
Puerto Rico	Gabriel Cheverre
Puerto Rico	Victor Colon
Puerto Rico	Carlos Latorre
Puerto Rico	Diego Lizardi
Puerto Rico	Alexander Suárez
Puerto Rico	Pedro Tort
Romania	Dan Burincă
Romania	Marius Gherman
Romania	Nicu Stroia
Romania	Marius Urzică
Russia	Alexei Nemov
Russia	Yevgeny Shabayev
Russia	Dmitri Vasilenko
Russia	Aleksey Voropayev
Slovakia	Arnold Bugár
Slovakia	Marian Kovac
Slovenia	Enes Hodžić
Slovenia	Dejan Ločnikar
Slovenia	Aljaž Pegan
Slovenia	Blaz Puljic
Slovenia	Roman Veble
South Korea	Han Yun-su
South Korea	Jeong Jin-su
South Korea	Lee Joo-hyung
South Korea	Yeo Hong-chul
South Korea	Yoo Ok-ryul
Sweden	Örjan Dahl
Sweden	Magnus Rosengren
Switzerland	Michael Engeler
Switzerland	Li Donghua
Turkey	Murat Canbaş
Turkey	Hakan Ünal
Ukraine	Ihor Korobchynskyi
Ukraine	Vitaly Marinich
Ukraine	Hrihoriy Misyutin
Ukraine	Volodymyr Shamenko
Ukraine	Rustam Sharipov
Ukraine	Yuriy Yermakov
United Kingdom	Paul Bowler
United Kingdom	Marvin Campbell
United Kingdom	Neil Thomas
United States	Mihai Bagiu
United States	Scott Keswick
United States	Paul O'Neill
United States	John Roethlisberger
United States	Mark Sohn
United States	Chainey Umphrey

=== Women ===
Country	Gymnast
Argentina	Vanessa Baglietti
Argentina	Romina Plataroti
Australia	Joanna Hughes
Australia	Cathy Keyser
Australia	Salli Wills
Austria	Ruscha Kouril
Belarus	Elena Piskun
Belarus	Alena Polonskaya
Belarus	Alena Polozkova
Belarus	Olga Yurkina
Belgium	Eline de Craemer
Belgium	Caroline Debras
Bolivia	Cecília Porras
Brazil	Leticia Ishii
Brazil	Silvia Mendes
Brazil	Adriana Silami
Canada	Marilou Cousineau
Canada	Stacey Galloway
Canada	Jaime Hill
Canada	Eve-Marie Poulin
China	Li Li
China	Luo Li
China	Mo Huilan
China	Qiao Ya
Chinese Taipei	Pei Chia-chiu
Czech Republic	Pavla Kinclová
Finland	Niina Parjanen
Finland	Leena-Kaisa Piiroinen
Finland	Sanna Vuori
France	Élodie Lussac
Germany	Rufina Kreibich
Germany	Julia Stratmann
Germany	Sandra Tomaschko
Greece	Lambrini Apostolidou
Greece	Chariklia Davou
Greece	Virginia Karentzou
Greece	Sofia Pidoula
Guatemala	Luisa Portocarrero
Hungary	Ildikó Dragoner
Hungary	Kinga Horváth
Hungary	Andrea Molnár
Israel	Michal Shahaf
Italy	Chiara Ferrazzi
Japan	Yuka Arai
Japan	Mari Kosuge
Japan	Hanako Miura
Kazakhstan	Olga Kim
Kazakhstan	Irina Yevdokimova
Kazakhstan	Anna Zaitseva
Mexico	Judith Cavazos
Mexico	Laura del Carmen Moreno
Mexico	Brenda Magaña
New Zealand	Hayley Edgell
Norway	Anita Tomulevski
Puerto Rico	Nanette Berrios
Puerto Rico	Francine Díaz
Puerto Rico	Yariza Yulian
Romania	Andreea Cacovean
Romania	Gina Gogean
Romania	Nadia Hațegan
Romania	Lavinia Miloșovici
Russia	Oksana Fabrichnova
Russia	Elena Grosheva
Russia	Svetlana Khorkina
Russia	Dina Kochetkova
Slovakia	Klaudia Kinská
Slovakia	Martina Kucharčíková
South Korea	Han Na-jung
South Korea	Heo So-young
South Korea	Ji Hae-sung
South Korea	Park Ji-young
Spain	Mónica Martín
Spain	Mercedes Pacheco
Spain	Elisabeth Valle
Ukraine	Irina Bulakhova
Ukraine	Oksana Knizhnik
Ukraine	Tatiana Lysenko
Ukraine	Lilia Podkopayeva
United Kingdom	Zita Lusack
United Kingdom	Annika Reeder
United Kingdom	Karin Szymko
United States	Amanda Borden
United States	Dominique Dawes
United States	Larissa Fontaine
United States	Shannon Miller

== Men's results ==
=== All-around ===
Rank	Gymnast	Floor (gymnastics)	Pommel horse	Rings (gymnastics)	Vault (gymnastics)	Parallel bars	Horizontal bar	Total
1st place, gold medalist(s)	Ivan Ivankov (BLR)	9.450	9.562	9.525	9.500	9.525	9.450	57.012
2nd place, silver medalist(s)	Aleksey Voropayev (RUS)	9.487	9.450	9.525	9.500	9.375	9.587	56.924
3rd place, bronze medalist(s)	Vitaly Scherbo (BLR)	9.550	9.675	8.950	9.650	8.925	9.600	56.350
4	Valery Belenky (GER)	9.300	9.600	9.612	9.000	9.525	9.275	56.312
5	Yevgeny Shabayev (RUS)	9.375	9.275	9.350	9.375	9.550	9.350	56.275
6	Ihor Korobchynskyi (UKR)	9.450	9.050	9.200	9.300	9.512	9.300	55.812
7	Lee Joo-hyung (KOR)	9.325	8.800	9.050	9.650	9.400	9.575	55.800
8	Jury Chechi (ITA)	9.200	8.850	9.687	9.350	9.325	9.350	55.762
9	Zoltán Supola (HUN)	8.775	9.462	9.350	9.375	9.350	9.350	55.662
10	Li Xiaoshuang (CHN)	9.450	8.775	9.475	9.650	9.350	8.950	55.650
11	Hikaru Tanaka (JPN)	9.200	9.025	9.425	9.200	9.400	9.325	55.575
12	Alexei Nemov (RUS)	9.350	9.325	9.150	8.950	9.487	9.100	55.362
13	Scott Keswick (USA)	8.750	9.225	9.500	8.975	9.400	9.425	55.275
14	Yoshiaki Hatakeda (JPN)	9.050	9.525	9.050	9.225	9.450	8.975	55.275
15	Yordan Yovchev (BUL)	9.350	9.100	9.587	9.200	9.300	8.675	55.212
16	Neil Thomas (GBR)	9.375	9.125	9.100	9.425	9.075	9.100	55.200
17	John Roethlisberger (USA)	8.800	9.450	9.150	9.275	8.950	9.450	55.075
18	Nicu Stroia (ROU)	8.250	9.400	9.475	9.200	9.175	9.562	55.062
19	Huang Huadong (CHN)	8.475	9.525	9.100	9.000	9.425	9.525	55.050
20	Éric Poujade (FRA)	8.850	9.687	8.975	9.250	8.900	9.375	55.037
21	Jan-Peter Nikiferow (GER)	9.125	9.325	9.125	9.125	8.975	9.250	54.925
22	Oliver Walther (GER)	8.925	9.400	9.462	9.150	9.225	8.725	54.887
23	Bret Hudson (AUS)	8.925	9.100	9.075	9.662	8.800	9.250	54.812
24	Chainey Umphrey (USA)	9.100	9.075	9.475	9.075	8.600	9.300	54.625
25	Boris Preti (ITA)	8.800	9.200	9.300	9.200	8.600	9.512	54.612
26	Miroslav Smetana (TCH)	8.800	8.625	9.400	9.175	9.350	9.200	54.550
27	Ivan Ivanov (BUL)	9.200	8.600	9.075	19.150	9.175	9.125	54.325
28	Andrea Massucchi (ITA)	8.875	8.625	9.425	9.075	9.100	9.025	54.125
29	Vladimir Shamenko (UKR)	9.225	8.525	9.000	9.225	9.075	8.975	54.025
30	Alan Nolet (CAN)	9.200	8.400	9.150	9.150	9.025	8.800	53.725
31	Alexander Selk (NED)	8.875	8.675	8.950	8.925	8.900	9.275	53.600
31	Tomáš Tvrdý (CZE)	8.325	9.000	9.075	9.025	8.825	9.350	53.600
33	Rasmus Brandtoft (DEN)	8.800	8.900	8.525	9.175	8.750	9.275	53.425
34	Han Yoon-soo (KOR)	8.700	8.300	9.000	9.175	9.375	8.850	53.400
35	Thomas Zimmerman (AUT)	8.600	9.450	8.800	8.850	8.950	8.725	53.375
36	Paul Bowler (GER)	8.625	9.000	8.475	9.425	8.775	9.025	53.325
37	Jurgen van Eetvelt (BEL)	8.675	8.750	9.150	9.000	8.850	8.875	53.300
37	Marius Urzică (ROU)	8.275	9.600	8.525	8.925	9.450	8.525	53.300
37	Magnus Rosengren (SWE)	9.375	9.050	9.125	9.450	8.525	8.775	53.300
40	Krasimir Dunev (BUL)	8.875	8.925	9.200	9.200	8.150	8.925	53.275
40	Marvin Campbell (GBR)	8.675	8.900	8.825	9.200	9.025	8.650	53.275
42	Michael Engeler (SUI)	8.925	8.975	8.650	9.300	8.450	8.950	53.250
43	Flemming Solberg (NOR)	8.550	9.300	8.550	9.200	9.025	8.500	53.125
44	Marius Gherman (ROU)	9.175	9.200	8.900	9.475	8.725	7.475	52.950
45	Daisuke Nishikawa (JPN)	8.800	7.750	9.000	9.275	9.075	9.025	52.925
46	Espen Jansen (NOR)	8.350	8.750	9.100	9.075	8.400	9.200	52.875
47	Nikolaos Kosmos (GRE)	8.575	9.300	9.025	9.050	8.925	7.975	52.850
48	Catalin Mircan (AUT)	8.300	9.500	8.550	8.875	8.550	8.800	52.575
49	Jari Monkkonen (FIN)	8.225	8.850	8.600	9.000	8.525	9.300	52.500
49	Dmitry Rybalko (KAZ)	8.950	8.900	8.950	9.225	8.225	8.250	52.500
49	Francisco López (MEX)	8.575	8.725	8.550	9.125	8.475	9.050	52.500
52	Travis Romagnoli (CAN)	8.650	8.100	8.750	9.050	8.825	9.100	52.475
53	Sergey Fedorchenko (KAZ)	8.925	9.100	8.650	9.550	8.150	8.050	52.425
54	Ivan Pavlovsky (BLR)	9.050	9.025	8.125	9.100	7.925	9.075	52.300
54	Ron Kaplan (ISR)	8.525	8.475	8.975	9.025	8.650	8.650	52.300
56	Victor Colon (PUR)	8.525	8.225	8.925	9.375	8.875	8.025	51.950
57	Jonathan Sianturi (INA)	8.200	8.500	8.750	8.975	8.725	8.675	51.825
58	Arnold Bugár (SVK)	8.425	8.850	8.175	9.075	8.875	8.375	51.775
59	Diego Lizardi (PUR)	8.950	8.250	9.150	8.825	8.450	7.975	51.600
60	Darren Bersuk (CAN)	8.300	7.800	8.725	9.125	8.950	8.500	51.400
61	Patrice Casimir (FRA)	8.125	9.500	8.050	8.100	9.025	8.550	51.350
62	Christian Selk (NED)	8.550	7.775	8.725	8.825	8.625	8.825	51.325
63	Dejan Ločnikar (SLO)	7.550	8.250	8.575	8.850	9.075	8.725	51.025
64	Jani Tanskanen (FIN)	8.400	8.650	8.675	8.775	8.175	8.275	50.950
64	Nikolaos Kentimentos (GRE)	8.550	9.200	8.175	8.575	8.125	8.325	50.950
66	Pedro Tort (PUR)	8.275	8.175	9.100	8.600	8.475	8.300	50.925
67	Jani Winterhalter (FIN)	8.025	8.700	7.900	8.700	8.600	8.925	50.850
68	Andres Sánchez (MEX)	8.400	8.225	8.150	9.050	8.800	7.350	49.975
69	Dimosthenis Tampakos (GRE)	7.900	8.875	8.450	7.725	8.600	8.350	49.900
70	Lucijan Krce (CRO)	8.150	8.475	8.650	8.825	7.675	8.075	49.850
71	José Solano (MEX)	7.975	7.825	8.500	8.950	8.350	8.200	49.800
72	Ratko Jovanović (CRO)	7.750	7.125	8.900	9.075	8.100	8.675	49.625
73	Klemen Bedenik (SLO)	7.950	8.675	7.750	8.450	8.750	8.025	49.600
73	Tor Einar Refsnes (NOR)	7.250	7.950	7.775	9.100	8.925	8.600	49.600
75	Tanguy Nuyts (BEL)	7.350	8.800	7.925	8.600	7.750	8.625	49.050
76	Peter Novac (CZE)	7.425	8.050	7.925	8.600	8.150	8.575	48.725
77	Khaerudin Pasaribu (INA)	7.850	7.625	8.675	8.800	7.525	8.200	48.675
78	Kleber Sato (BRA)	7.825	7.375	8.325	8.150	7.975	7.975	48.625
79	Pierre-Yves Lequeux (BEL)	7.850	8.275	8.025	8.425	7.950	7.550	48.075
80	Hakan Unal (TUR)	8.150	7.175	8.025	9.075	7.525	7.150	47.100
81	Ujung Sutrisno (INA)	7.900	6.725	8.375	8.600	6.925	9.725	45.250
82	Ignacio Morales (BOL)	7.575	6.900	7.875	8.025	7.450	7.200	45.025
83	Peter Hogan (AUS)	0.000	9.025	8.975	8.275	9.375	9.125	44.775
84	Jung Jin-soo (KOR)	9.000	0.000	8.875	9.250	9.225	7.850	44.200
85	Bruce Craig (NZL)	0.000	7.450	8.050	8.675	8.075	8.525	40.775

=== Floor exercise ===
Rank	Gymnast	Total
1st place, gold medalist(s)	Vitaly Scherbo (BLR)	9.725
2nd place, silver medalist(s)	Neil Thomas (GBR)	9.687
2nd place, silver medalist(s)	Ioannis Melissanidis (GRE)	9.687
4	Hrihoriy Misyutin (UKR)	9.650
5	Ihor Korobchynskyi (UKR)	9.612
5	Li Dashuang (CHN)	9.612
7	Ivan Ivanov (BUL)	9.337
8	Masanori Suzuki (JPN)	8.700

=== Pommel horse ===
Rank	Gymnast	Total
1st place, gold medalist(s)	Marius Urzică (ROU)	9.712
2nd place, silver medalist(s)	Éric Poujade (FRA)	9.700
3rd place, bronze medalist(s)	Li Donghua (SUI)	9.662
3rd place, bronze medalist(s)	Vitaly Marinich (UKR)	9.662
5	Huang Huadong (CHN)	9.650
6	Mark Sohn (USA)	9.625
7	Valery Belenky (GER)	9.600
8	Ihor Korobchynskyi (UKR)	8.912

=== Rings ===
Rank	Gymnast	Total
1st place, gold medalist(s)	Jury Chechi (ITA)	9.787
2nd place, silver medalist(s)	Paul O'Neill (USA)	9.725
3rd place, bronze medalist(s)	Valery Belenky (GER)	9.700
3rd place, bronze medalist(s)	Dan Burincă (ROU)	9.700
5	Andreas Wecker (GER)	9.637
6	Rustam Sharipov (UKR)	9.600
7	Szilveszter Csollány (HUN)	9.587
8	Yordan Yovchev (BUL)	9.400

=== Vault ===
Rank	Gymnast	Total
1st place, gold medalist(s)	Vitaly Scherbo (BLR)	9.674
2nd place, silver medalist(s)	Li Xiaoshuang (CHN)	9.618
3rd place, bronze medalist(s)	Yeo Hong-chul (KOR)	9.600
4	Ivan Ivankov (BLR)	9.481
5	Yoo Ok-ryul (KOR)	9.356
6	Masanori Suzuki (JPN)	9.275
7	Murat Canbaş (TUR)	9.225
8	Hrihoriy Misyutin (UKR)	9.187

=== Parallel bars ===
Rank	Gymnast	Total
1st place, gold medalist(s)	Huang Liping (CHN)	9.775
2nd place, silver medalist(s)	Rustam Sharipov (UKR)	9.612
3rd place, bronze medalist(s)	Alexei Nemov (RUS)	9.575
4	Yevgeny Shabayev (RUS)	9.550
4	Ivan Ivanov (BUL)	9.550
4	Vitaly Scherbo (BLR)	9.550
7	Jung Jin-soo (KOR)	9.487
8	Lee Joo-hyung (KOR)	9.450

=== Horizontal bar ===
Rank	Gymnast	Total
1st place, gold medalist(s)	Vitaly Scherbo (BLR)	9.687
2nd place, silver medalist(s)	Zoltán Supola (HUN)	9.537
3rd place, bronze medalist(s)	Ivan Ivankov (BLR)	9.500
4	Chainey Umphrey (USA)	9.487
5	Csaba Fajkusz (HUN)	9.450
6	Aljaž Pegan (SLO)	9.275
7	Boris Preti (ITA)	9.225
8	Jari Monkkonen (FIN)	8.950

== Women's results ==
=== All-around ===
Rank	Gymnast	Vault (gymnastics)	Uneven bars	Balance beam	Floor (gymnastics)	Total
1st place, gold medalist(s)	Shannon Miller (USA)	9.812	9.850	9.862	9.750	39.274
2nd place, silver medalist(s)	Lavinia Miloșovici (ROU)	9.812	9.775	9.837	9.812	39.236
3rd place, bronze medalist(s)	Dina Kotchetkova (RUS)	9.725	9.825	9.775	9.800	39.125
4	Gina Gogean (ROU)	9.737	9.775	9.762	9.787	39.061
5	Dominique Dawes (USA)	9.506	9.850	9.812	9.800	38.968
6	Lilia Podkopayeva (UKR)	9.718	9.612	9.837	9.775	38.942
7	Mo Huilan (CHN)	9.687	9.900	9.612	9.725	38.924
8	Nadia Hațegan (ROU)	9.699	9.700	9.762	9.675	38.836
9	Svetlana Khorkina (RUS)	9.693	9.825	9.612	9.675	38.805
10	Elena Piskun (BLR)	9.693	9.662	9.762	9.650	38.767
11	Qiao Ya (CHN)	9.599	9.337	9.812	9.700	38.448
12	Elena Grosheva (RUS)	9.462	9.775	9.600	9.487	38.324
13	Alena Polozkova (BLR)	9.549	9.487	9.625	9.550	38.211
13	Andrea Molnár (HUN)	9.662	9.550	9.587	9.412	38.211
15	Virginia Karentzou (GRE)	9.531	9.512	9.500	9.525	38.068
16	Irina Bulakhova (UKR)	9.156	9.750	9.525	9.575	38.006
17	Larissa Fontaine (USA)	9.637	9.700	8.975	9.575	37.887
18	Tatiana Lysenko (UKR)	9.550	9.450	9.162	9.700	37.862
19	Julia Stratmann (GER)	9.543	9.162	9.550	9.550	37.805
20	Lambrini Apostolidou (GRE)	9.512	9.012	9.537	9.575	37.636
21	Michal Shahaf (ISR)	9.593	9.412	9.200	9.200	37.405
22	Romina Plataroti (ARG)	9.218	9.562	9.487	9.100	37.367
23	Anna Zaitseva (KAZ)	9.562	9.212	9.300	9.262	37.336
24	Marilou Cousineau (CAN)	9.481	9.512	8.875	9.462	37.330
25	Olga Yurkina (BLR)	9.631	9.525	8.662	9.500	37.318
26	Mari Kosuge (JPN)	9.149	9.512	9.125	9.487	37.273
27	Mercedes Pacheco (ESP)	9.443	9.675	8.925	9.150	37.193
28	Mónica Martín (ESP)	9.106	9.500	9.687	8.837	36.830
29	Yuka Arai (JPN)	9.381	9.387	8.862	9.100	36.730
30	Chiara Ferrazzi (ITA)	8.881	9.487	9.212	9.062	36.642
31	Vanessa Baglietti (ARG)	8.875	8.837	9.525	9.262	36.499
32	Olga Kim (KAZ)	9.043	9.562	8.975	8.912	36.492
33	Jaime Hill (CAN)	9.418	8.837	9.487	8.725	36.467
34	Rufina Kreibich (GER)	9.624	8.300	8.800	9.650	36.374
35	Irina Yevdokimova (KAZ)	9.637	9.275	7.887	9.487	36.286
36	Eve-Marie Poulin (CAN)	9.375	9.487	9.000	8.300	36.162
36	Elisabeth Valle (ESP)	9.525	9.162	8.325	9.150	36.162
38	Karin Szymko (GBR)	9.268	9.300	8.912	8.662	36.142
39	Ji Hae-sung (KOR)	9.481	9.575	7.575	9.462	36.093
40	Caroline Debras (BEL)	9.137	9.025	9.050	8.850	36.062
41	Martina Kucharčíková (SVK)	9.343	9.000	9.100	8.600	36.043
42	Han Na-jung (KOR)	9.368	8.637	8.912	9.025	35.942
43	Laura del Carmen Moreno (MEX)	9.406	9.112	8.675	8.662	35.855
44	Annika Reeder (GBR)	8.881	8.500	8.925	9.500	35.806
45	Heo So-young (KOR)	9.593	8.412	8.575	9.162	35.742
46	Anita Tomulevski (NOR)	9.349	9.650	8.625	7.925	35.549
47	Zita Lusack (GBR)	9.056	9.175	8.050	9.237	35.518
48	Klaudia Kinská (SVK)	9.681	8.837	7.975	8.925	35.418
49	Ruscha Kouril (AUT)	9.243	8.825	8.950	8.300	35.318
50	Brenda Magaña (MEX)	8.993	9.162	8.375	8.612	35.142
51	Hanako Miura (JPN)	9.481	8.737	7.912	9.000	35.130
52	Ildikó Dragoner (HUN)	9.493	8.162	8.425	8.750	34.830
53	Adriana Silami (BRA)	8.912	8.725	8.400	8.762	34.799
54	Kinga Horváth (HUN)	9.075	9.000	7.950	8.737	34.787
55	Pavla Kinclová (CZE)	9.293	7.787	8.900	8.775	34.755
56	Eline de Craemer (BEL)	9.368	8.025	8.325	8.500	34.218
57	Nanette Berrios (PUR)	8.862	8.512	8.400	8.300	34.074
58	Leena-Kaisa Piiroinen (FIN)	8.862	8.400	7.937	8.475	33.674
59	Niina Parjanen (FIN)	8.968	8.125	8.250	8.137	33.480
60	Sanna Vuori (FIN)	9.025	7.625	7.550	8.587	32.787
61	Hayley Edgell (NZL)	8.768	7.700	8.137	8.000	32.506
62	Yariza Yulian (PUR)	8.931	8.050	7.862	8.350	32.193
63	Francine Díaz (PUR)	8.956	7.612	7.525	7.650	31.743
64	Cecília Porras (BOL)	8.462	6.512	7.162	7.612	29.748
65	Joanna Hughes (AUS)	0.000	0.000	9.100	0.000	9.100
66	Leticia Ishii (BRA)	0.000	2.000	0.000	0.000	2.000

=== Vault ===
Rank	Gymnast	Total
1st place, gold medalist(s)	Gina Gogean (ROU)	9.812
2nd place, silver medalist(s)	Svetlana Khorkina (RUS)	9.800
3rd place, bronze medalist(s)	Lavinia Miloșovici (ROU)	9.787
4	Tatiana Lysenko (UKR)	9.737
5	Elena Piskun (BLR)	9.725
6	Dina Kochetkova (RUS)	9.699
7	Shannon Miller (USA)	9.543
8	Lilia Podkopayeva (UKR)	9.424

=== Uneven bars ===
Rank	Gymnast	Total
1st place, gold medalist(s)	Luo Li (CHN)	9.912
2nd place, silver medalist(s)	Svetlana Khorkina (RUS)	9.875
3rd place, bronze medalist(s)	Dina Kochetkova (RUS)	9.850
4	Dominique Dawes (USA)	9.775
5	Lilia Podkopayeva (UKR)	9.350
6	Lavinia Miloșovici (ROU)	9.250
7	Nadia Hațegan (ROU)	9.137
8	Amanda Borden (USA)	9.050

=== Balance beam ===
Rank	Gymnast	Total
1st place, gold medalist(s)	Shannon Miller (USA)	9.875
2nd place, silver medalist(s)	Lilia Podkopayeva (UKR)	9.737
3rd place, bronze medalist(s)	Oksana Fabrichnova (RUS)	9.712
4	Nadia Hațegan (ROU)	9.687
5	Lavinia Miloșovici (ROU)	9.675
6	Dominique Dawes (USA)	9.650
7	Qiao Ya (CHN)	9.212
8	Julia Stratmann (GER)	8.650

=== Floor exercise ===
Rank	Gymnast	Total
1st place, gold medalist(s)	Dina Kochetkova (RUS)	9.850
2nd place, silver medalist(s)	Lavinia Miloșovici (ROU)	9.837
3rd place, bronze medalist(s)	Gina Gogean (ROU)	9.762
4	Shannon Miller (USA)	9.687
5	Elena Piskun (BLR)	9.675
6	Dominique Dawes (USA)	9.662
7	Mo Huilan (CHN)	9.462
8	Svetlana Khorkina (RUS)	8.487

- NB: For this competition, tie-breaker policies were used. When scores were identical, the gymnast with the higher score in the preliminary round was awarded the higher placement in finals.
