= Gymnastics at the 1992 Summer Olympics – Men's artistic individual all-around =

Olympic gymnastics event

Men's artistic individual all-around at the Games of the XXV Olympiad
- Pictogram for Gymnastics
- Venue: Palau Sant Jordi
- Dates: 29–31 July 1992
- Competitors: 93 from 25 nations

Medalists
1st place, gold medalist(s)		Vitaly Scherbo	Unified Team
2nd place, silver medalist(s)		Grigory Misutin	Unified Team
3rd place, bronze medalist(s)		Valery Belenky	Unified Team

The men's individual all-around competition was one of eight events for male competitors in artistic gymnastics at the 1992 Summer Olympics in Barcelona. The qualification and final rounds took place on July 29 and 31 at the Palau Sant Jordi. There were 93 competitors from 25 nations. Each nation could enter a team of 6 gymnasts or up to 3 individual gymnasts. The event was won by Vitaly Scherbo, one of his six gold medals in 1992. The Unified Team, making its only Summer Olympics appearance, swept the medals, with Scherbo taking gold, Grigory Misutin silver, and Valery Belenky bronze. It was the second consecutive medal sweep in the event (the Soviet Union had done it in 1988) and fourth overall (France in 1900, Japan in 1972).

== Background ==
This was the 21st appearance of the men's individual all-around. The first individual all-around competition had been held in 1900, after the 1896 competitions featured only individual apparatus events. A men's individual all-around has been held every Games since 1900.

Five of the top 11 gymnasts (including a tie for tenth place) from the 1988 Games returned: fourth-place finisher Sven Tippelt of East Germany (now competing for unified Germany), fifth-place finisher Marius Gherman of Romania, sixth-place finisher Kalofer Khristozov of Bulgaria, eighth-place finisher Yukio Iketani of Japan, and tenth-place finisher Sylvio Kroll of East Germany (now Germany). The reigning (1991) World Champion was Grigory Misutin of the Soviet Union/Unified Team, with his teammate Vitaly Scherbo second. The 1989 World Champion (and 1992 European champion) Igor Korobchinsky, also of the Soviet Union/Unified Team, also competed in Barcelona.

Puerto Rico and Slovenia each made their debut in the event. Some former Soviet republics competed together as the Unified Team. France made its 19th appearance, most among nations.

== Competition format ==
In the first major format change since 1976 (when the number of gymnasts per nation in the final was limited to three), the 1992 Games ended the carryover of preliminary scores to the final. The preliminary round and final round were now separate. In the preliminary round (which also served as the team all-around competition as well as the qualifying round for the individual apparatus events), each gymnast performed a compulsory exercise and an optional exercise on each apparatus. The scores for all 12 exercises were summed to give an individual all-around preliminary score. The top 36 gymnasts advanced to the individual all-around final—except that each nation was limited to 3 finalists. There, each of the finalists performed another exercise on each apparatus. The sum of these six exercise scores resulted in a final total.

Each exercise was scored from 0 to 10; thus, the preliminary apparatus scores ranged from 0 to 20 each and the total preliminary score from 0 to 120. The final total, with six exercises, was from 0 to 60.

The preliminary exercise scores were also used for qualification for the apparatus finals.

== Schedule ==
All times are Central European Summer Time (UTC+2)

Date	Time	Round
Wednesday, 29 July 1992		Preliminary
Friday, 31 July 1992	20:00	Final

== Results ==
Eighty-nine gymnasts competed in the all-around during the compulsory and optional rounds on July 29. The thirty-six highest scoring gymnasts advanced to the final on July 31. Each country was limited to three competitors in the final.

Rank	Gymnast	Nation	Prelim	Floor	Pommel horse	Rings	Vault	Parallel bars	Horizontal bar	Total
1st place, gold medalist(s)	Vitaly Scherbo	Unified Team	117.875	9.875	9.875	9.900	9.800	9.800	9.775	59.025
2nd place, silver medalist(s)	Grigory Misutin	Unified Team	116.975	9.825	9.775	9.800	9.825	9.800	9.900	58.925
3rd place, bronze medalist(s)	Valery Belenky	Unified Team	117.500	9.825	9.850	9.775	9.575	9.825	9.775	58.625
4	Andreas Wecker	Germany	116.875	9.700	9.850	9.800	9.550	9.700	9.850	58.450
5	Li Xiaoshuang	China	116.450	9.825	9.750	9.700	9.625	9.650	9.600	58.150
6	Guo Linyao	China	115.900	9.650	9.800	9.600	9.550	9.675	9.650	57.925
7	Marius Gherman	Romania	115.300	9.525	9.675	9.400	9.725	9.675	9.700	57.700
8	Lee Joo-Hyung	South Korea	114.375	9.600	9.625	9.475	9.600	9.575	9.800	57.675
9	Han Yun-su	South Korea	113.825	9.550	9.650	9.475	9.600	9.650	9.725	57.650
9	Szilveszter Csollány	Hungary	114.500	9.625	9.675	9.675	9.550	9.550	9.575	57.650
11	Kalofer Hristozov	Bulgaria	115.300	9.575	9.700	9.650	9.550	9.550	9.575	57.600
12	Zoltán Supola	Hungary	115.275	9.600	9.575	9.475	9.650	9.600	9.650	57.550
13	Oliver Walther	Germany	114.425	9.325	9.625	9.500	9.625	9.600	9.800	57.475
13	Yoshiaki Hatakeda	Japan	115.300	9.625	9.725	9.300	9.475	9.750	9.600	57.475
15	Paolo Bucci	Italy	115.100	9.500	9.675	9.650	9.475	9.575	9.550	57.425
16	Boris Preti	Italy	115.275	9.575	9.400	9.625	9.600	9.500	9.575	57.275
16	Alfonso Rodriguez	Spain	115.000	9.600	9.650	9.675	9.600	9.650	9.100	57.275
18	Li Chunyang	China	115.925	9.700	9.750	9.700	9.575	9.600	8.875	57.200
19	Scott Keswick	United States	113.725	9.400	9.700	9.600	9.725	9.625	9.050	57.100
20	Neil Thomas	Great Britain	114.675	9.800	9.275	9.450	9.650	9.275	9.600	57.050
20	Adrian Gal	Romania	113.325	9.675	9.525	9.400	9.800	9.550	9.100	57.050
22	Ruggero Rossato	Italy	114.175	9.600	9.675	9.525	9.350	9.350	9.500	57.000
23	Yukio Iketani	Japan	115.450	9.725	9.725	9.050	9.525	9.725	9.150	56.900
23	Yoo Ok-Ryul	South Korea	115.025	9.800	9.500	9.525	9.625	9.450	9.000	56.900
25	Michael Engeler	Switzerland	113.875	9.675	9.575	9.300	9.575	9.425	9.275	56.825
26	Sylvio Kroll	Germany	114.850	9.275	9.800	9.575	9.425	9.500	9.125	56.700
27	Takashi Chinen	Japan	115.275	9.575	9.125	9.550	9.375	9.625	9.425	56.675
28	Csaba Fajkusz	Hungary	113.925	9.625	9.550	9.400	9.350	8.900	9.725	56.550
29	Pae Gil-Su	North Korea	114.425	9.300	9.875	9.425	9.350	9.625	8.950	56.525
30	Marian Rizan	Romania	114.725	9.125	9.700	9.175	9.450	9.625	9.400	56.475
31	Patrice Casimir	France	113.750	9.475	9.650	9.475	9.575	8.675	9.575	56.425
32	Sébastien Darrigade	France	113.325	9.600	9.150	9.250	9.500	9.425	9.450	56.375
33	James May	Great Britain	113.225	9.650	9.450	9.325	9.075	9.325	9.525	56.350
34	John Roethlisberger	United States	114.200	8.400	9.700	9.525	9.500	9.425	9.550	56.100
35	M. Chris Waller	United States	114.800	8.575	9.125	9.450	9.375	9.600	9.675	55.800
36	Curtis Hibbert	Canada	113.425	8.200	9.300	9.025	9.050	9.500	9.050	54.125
