= 1992 European Women's Artistic Gymnastics Championships =

19th European Women's Artistic Gymnastics Championships
- Location: Nantes, France
- Dates: 22–24 May 1992

The 19th European Women's Artistic Gymnastics Championships was held in Nantes, France in 1992.

== Medalists ==
Event	Gold	Silver	Bronze
Seniors
All-around	Tatiana Gutsu (UKR)	Gina Gogean (ROU)	Vanda Hădărean (ROU)
Vault	Tatiana Gutsu (UKR)	Gina Gogean (ROU)	Silvia Mitova (BUL)
Uneven bars	Tatiana Gutsu (UKR)	Tatiana Lysenko (UKR)	Yelena Grudneva (RUS)
Balance beam	Svetlana Boginskaya (BLR)	Tatiana Gutsu (UKR)	Ludmila Stovbchataya (UKR)
Floor	Gina Gogean (ROU)	Mélanie Legros (FRA)	Tatiana Gutsu (UKR)

== Results ==
=== All-around ===
Rank	Gymnast	Vault (gymnastics)	Uneven bars	Balance beam	Floor (gymnastics)	Total
1st place, gold medalist(s)	Tatiana Gutsu (UKR)	9.900	9.950	9.925	9.950	39.725
2nd place, silver medalist(s)	Gina Gogean (ROU)	9.962	9.887	9.862	9.937	39.648
3rd place, bronze medalist(s)	Vanda Hădărean (ROU)	9.825	9.875	9.862	9.850	39.412
4	Tatiana Lysenko (UKR)	9.887	9.900	9.400	9.950	39.137
5	Svetlana Boginskaya (BLR)	9.937	9.937	9.937	9.325	39.136
6	Ludmila Stovbchataya (UKR)	9.725	9.662	9.862	9.812	39.061
7	Chloé Maigre (FRA)	9.725	9.812	9.825	9.637	38.999
8	Krisztina Molnár (HUN)	9.825	9.762	9.862	9.537	38.986
9	Ruth Rollan (ESP)	9.662	9.812	9.837	9.650	38.961
10	Elena Grudneva (RUS)	9.850	9.862	9.837	9.300	38.849
11	Pavla Kinclová (TCH)	9.800	9.650	9.750	9.612	38.812
12	Dina Kochetkova (RUS)	9.650	9.712	9.825	9.612	38.799
12	Silvia Mitova (BUL)	9.900	9.325	9.737	9.837	38.799
14	Andrea Molnár (HUN)	9.862	9.237	9.837	9.825	38.761
15	Daniela Bartova (TCH)	9.625	9.737	9.725	9.637	38.724

=== Vault ===
Rank	Gymnast	Total
1st place, gold medalist(s)	Tatiana Gutsu (UKR)	9.950
2nd place, silver medalist(s)	Gina Gogean (ROU)	9.943
3rd place, bronze medalist(s)	Silvia Mitova (BUL)	9.906
4	Andrea Molnár (HUN)	9.893
5	Yelena Grudneva (RUS)	9.887
6	Tatiana Lysenko (UKR)	9.862
7	Elvira Becks (NED)	9.743
8	Svetlana Boginskaya (BLR)	9.675

=== Uneven bars ===
Rank	Gymnast	Total
1st place, gold medalist(s)	Tatiana Gutsu (UKR)	9.937
2nd place, silver medalist(s)	Tatiana Lysenko (UKR)	9.900
3rd place, bronze medalist(s)	Yelena Grudneva (RUS)	9.875
4	Svetlana Boginskaya (BLR)	9.850
4	Snezhana Khristakieva (BUL)	9.850
6	Vanda Hădărean (ROU)	9.812
7	Cristina Fraguas (ESP)	9.750
8	Gina Gogean (ROU)	9.687

=== Balance beam ===
Rank	Gymnast	Total
1st place, gold medalist(s)	Svetlana Boginskaya (BLR)	9.950
2nd place, silver medalist(s)	Tatiana Gutsu (UKR)	9.900
3rd place, bronze medalist(s)	Ludmila Stovbchataya (UKR)	9.887
4	Vanda Hădărean (ROU)	9.837
5	Yelena Grudneva (RUS)	9.825
5	Krisztina Molnár (HUN)	9.825
7	Ruth Rollán (ESP)	9.737
8	Gina Gogean (ROU)	9.412

=== Floor ===
Rank	Gymnast	Total
1st place, gold medalist(s)	Gina Gogean (ROU)	9.925
2nd place, silver medalist(s)	Mélanie Legros (FRA)	9.900
3rd place, bronze medalist(s)	Tatiana Gutsu (UKR)	9.887
4	Tatiana Ignatova (RUS)	9.875
4	Tatiana Lysenko (UKR)	9.875
4	Silvia Mitova (BUL)	9.875
7	Vanda Hădărean (ROU)	9.850
8	Andrea Molnár (HUN)	9.787
