= Gymnastics at the 1996 Summer Olympics – Men's pommel horse =

Olympic gymnastics event

Men's pommel horse at the Games of the XXVI Olympiad
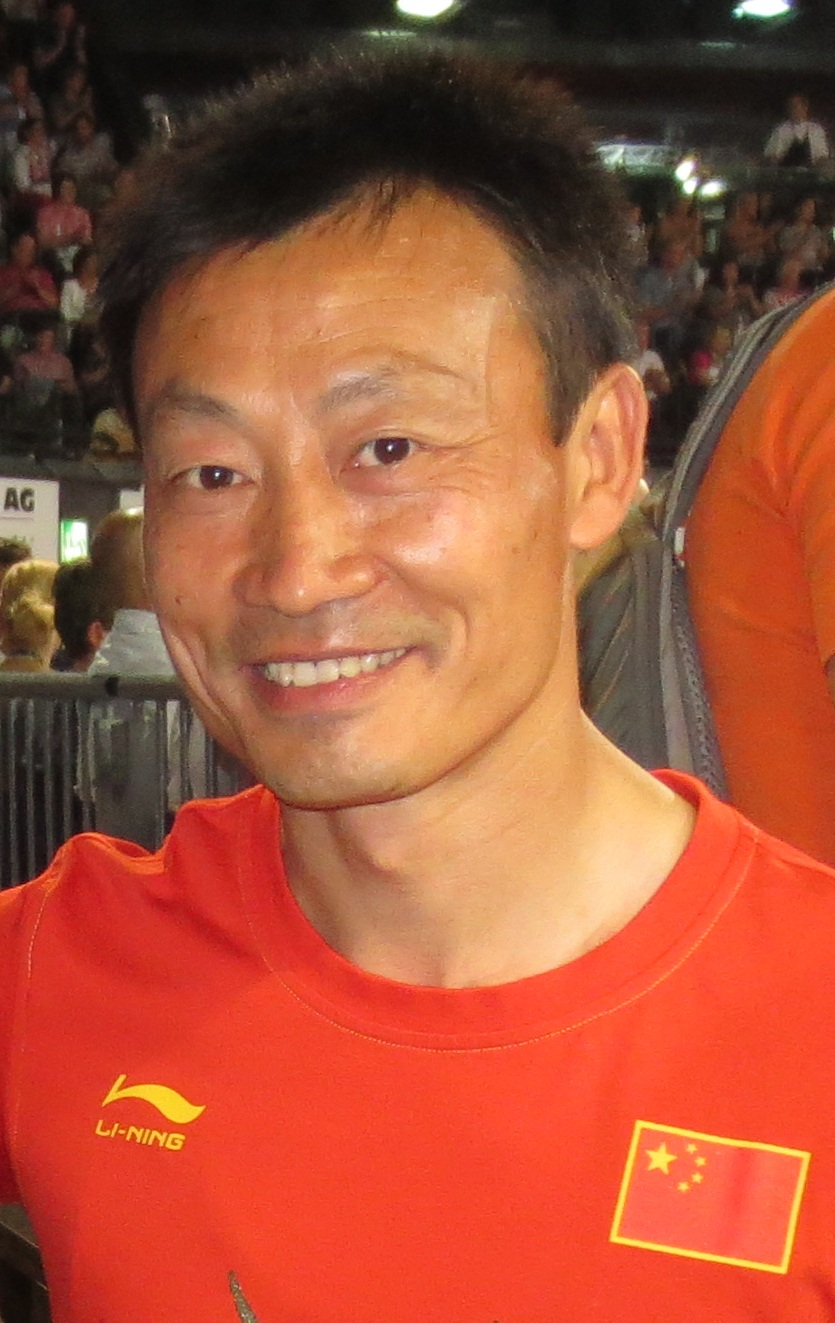
- Li Donghua (2013)
- Venue: Georgia Dome
- Dates: 20–28 July 1996
- Competitors: 102 from 31 nations
- Winning score: 9.875

Medalists
1st place, gold medalist(s)		Li Donghua; Switzerland
2nd place, silver medalist(s)		Marius Urzică; Romania
3rd place, bronze medalist(s)		Alexei Nemov; Russia

The men's pommel horse competition was one of eight events for male competitors in artistic gymnastics at the 1996 Summer Olympics in Atlanta. The qualification and final rounds took place on July 20, 22 and 28th at the Georgia Dome. There were 102 competitors from 31 nations, with nations in the team event having up to 7 gymnasts (under the "7-6-5" system unique to 1996, teams had 7 gymnasts, designated 6 for each apparatus with 5 to count; however, all 7 could compete on each apparatus for individual purposes) and other nations having up to 3 gymnasts. The event was won by Li Donghua of Switzerland, the nation's first victory in the men's pommel horse since 1928 (and fourth overall, tying Finland and Hungary for second-most after the Soviet Union's five). It was the first time since 1980 that the pommel horse did not have a tie for first place. Marius Urzică earned Romania's first pommel horse medal with his silver, while Alexei Nemov earned Russia's first as a nation separate from the Soviet Union with his bronze.

== Background ==
This was the 19th appearance of the event, which is one of the five apparatus events held every time there were apparatus events at the Summer Olympics (no apparatus events were held in 1900, 1908, 1912, or 1920). Five of the eight finalists from 1992 returned: gold medalists Vitaly Scherbo of the Unified Team (now competing for Belarus) and Pae Gil-su of North Korea, bronze medalist Andreas Wecker of Germany, sixth-place finisher Yoshiaki Hatakeda of Japan, and seventh-place finisher Valery Belenky of the Unified Team (now competing for Germany). Pae had won two of the four world championships since the last Games (1993 and 1996), with Marius Urzică of Romania in 1994 and Li Donghua of Switzerland winning in 1995.

Armenia, Barbados, Belarus, Croatia, the Czech Republic, Georgia, Iceland, Ireland, Kazakhstan, Russia, and Ukraine each made their debut in the men's pommel horse. Greece competed for the first time since 1896. The United States made its 17th appearance, most of any nation; the Americans had missed only the inaugural 1896 pommel horse and the boycotted 1980 Games.

== Competition format ==
The 1996 gymnastics competition introduced the "7–6–5" format, in which each team had 7 members, designated 6 for each apparatus, and had 5 count for team scores. However, all 7 could compete on each apparatus for individual competition purposes. Other nations could enter up to 3 individual gymnasts. All entrants in the gymnastics competitions performed both a compulsory exercise and a voluntary exercise for each apparatus (except for any apparatus in which a team member was not competing). The scores for all 12 exercises were summed to give an individual all-around qualifying score for those gymnasts competing on every apparatus. These exercise scores were also used for qualification for the apparatus finals. The two exercises (compulsory and voluntary) for each apparatus were summed to give an apparatus score. The top eight gymnasts, with a limit of two per nation, advanced to the final. Non-finalists were ranked 9th through 102nd based on preliminary score. The preliminary score had no effect on the final; once the eight finalists were selected, their ranking depended only on the final exercise.

== Schedule ==
All times are Eastern Daylight Time (UTC-4)

Date	Time	Round
Saturday, 20 July 1996		Preliminary: Compulsory
Monday, 22 July 1996		Preliminary: Voluntary
Sunday, 28 July 1996	22:31	Final

== Results ==
=== Qualifying ===
102 gymnasts competed in the pommel horse event during the compulsory and optional rounds on July 20 and 22. The eight highest scoring gymnasts advanced to the final on July 28. Each country was limited to two competitors in the final.

=== Final ===
Rank	Gymnast	Nation	Score
1st place, gold medalist(s)	Li Donghua	Switzerland	9.875
2nd place, silver medalist(s)	Marius Urzică	Romania	9.825
3rd place, bronze medalist(s)	Alexei Nemov	Russia	9.787
4	Patrice Casimir	France	9.762
5	Yoshiaki Hatakeda	Japan	9.712
5	Huang Huadong	China	9.712
7	Eric Poujade	France	9.350
8	Fan Bin	China	9.300
