= Gymnastics at the 1996 Summer Olympics – Men's horizontal bar =

Men's horizontal bar at the Games of the XXVI Olympiad
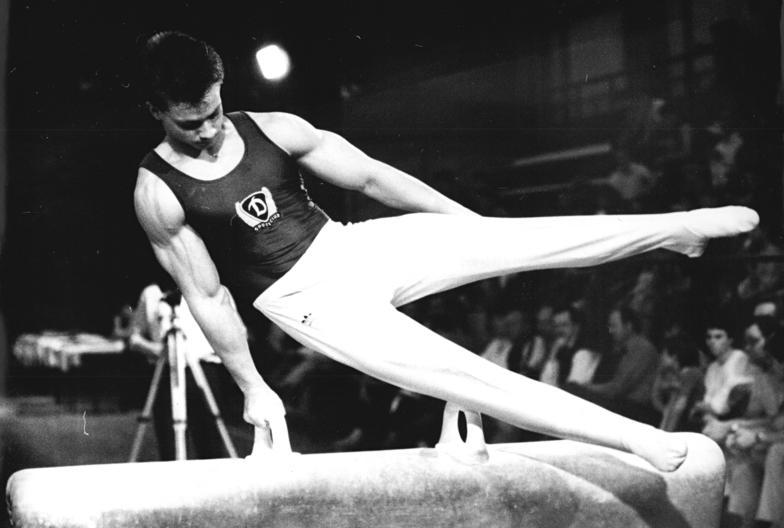
- Andreas Wecker (1989, on pommel horse)
- Venue: Georgia Dome
- Dates: 20–29 July 1996
- Competitors: 105 from 31 nations
- Winning score: 9.850

Medalists
1st place, gold medalist(s)		Andreas Wecker; Germany
2nd place, silver medalist(s)		Krasimir Dunev; Bulgaria
3rd place, bronze medalist(s)		Vitaly Scherbo; Belarus
3rd place, bronze medalist(s)		Fan Bin; China
3rd place, bronze medalist(s)		Alexei Nemov; Russia

The men's horizontal bar competition was one of eight events for male competitors in artistic gymnastics at the 1996 Summer Olympics in Atlanta. The qualification and final rounds took place on July 20, 22 and 28th at the Georgia Dome. There were 105 competitors from 31 nations, with nations in the team event having up to 7 gymnasts (under the "7-6-5" system unique to 1996, teams had 7 gymnasts, designated 6 for each apparatus with 5 to count; however, all 7 could compete on each apparatus for individual purposes) and other nations having up to 3 gymnasts. The event was won by Andreas Wecker of Germany, the nation's first victory in the men's horizontal bar since 1896. Wecker, who had won silver four years earlier, was the ninth man to win multiple medals in the event. Silver in 1996 went to Krasimir Dunev, Bulgaria's first horizontal bar medalist since 1980. There was a three-way tie for bronze: Russia and Belarus earned medals in their first independent appearances with Alexei Nemov and Vitaly Scherbo, respectively, while Fan Bin earned China's first medal in the event since 1984.

== Background ==
This was the 19th appearance of the event, which is one of the five apparatus events held every time there were apparatus events at the Summer Olympics (no apparatus events were held in 1900, 1908, 1912, or 1920). Three of the eight finalists from 1992 returned: silver medalist Andreas Wecker of Germany and fifth-place finishers Valery Belenky of the Unified Team (now competing for Germany) and Yoshiaki Hatakeda of Japan. Wecker had shared silver in Barcelona 1992 with Grigory Misutin of the Unified Team (now Ukraine); Misutin competed in other apparatus in Atlanta 1996 but not on the horizontal bar. 1996 was the only time that world championships had been held all four years since the last Olympics; the title winners all competed in Atlanta: Sergei Kharkov of Russia (1993), Vitaly Scherbo of Belarus (1994), Wecker (1995), and Jesús Carballo of Spain.

Armenia, Barbados, Belarus, Croatia, the Czech Republic, Georgia, Iceland, Ireland, Kazakhstan, Russia, and Ukraine each made their debut in the men's horizontal bar. Greece competed for the first time since 1896. The United States made its 17th appearance, most of any nation; the Americans had missed only the inaugural 1896 event and the boycotted 1980 Games.

== Competition format ==
The 1996 gymnastics competition introduced the "7–6–5" format, in which each team had 7 members, designated 6 for each apparatus, and had 5 count for team scores. However, all 7 could compete on each apparatus for individual competition purposes. Other nations could enter up to 3 individual gymnasts. All entrants in the gymnastics competitions performed both a compulsory exercise and a voluntary exercise for each apparatus (except for any apparatus in which a team member was not competing). The scores for all 12 exercises were summed to give an individual all-around qualifying score for those gymnasts competing on every apparatus. These exercise scores were also used for qualification for the apparatus finals. The two exercises (compulsory and voluntary) for each apparatus were summed to give an apparatus score. The top eight gymnasts, with a limit of two per nation, advanced to the final. Non-finalists were ranked 9th through 105th based on preliminary score. The preliminary score had no effect on the final; once the eight finalists were selected, their ranking depended only on the final exercise.

== Schedule ==
All times are Eastern Daylight Time (UTC-4)

Date	Time	Round
Saturday, 20 July 1996		Preliminary: Compulsory
Monday, 22 July 1996		Preliminary: Voluntary
Monday, 29 July 1996	22:43	Final

== Results ==
=== Qualifying ===
Ninety-five gymnasts competed in the horizontal bar event during the compulsory and optional rounds on July 20 and 22. The eight highest scoring gymnasts advanced to the final on July 29. Each country was limited to two competitors in the final.

=== Final ===
Rank	Gymnast	Nation	Score
1st place, gold medalist(s)	Andreas Wecker	Germany	9.850
2nd place, silver medalist(s)	Krasimir Dunev	Bulgaria	9.825
3rd place, bronze medalist(s)	Vitaly Scherbo	Belarus	9.800
3rd place, bronze medalist(s)	Fan Bin	China	9.800
3rd place, bronze medalist(s)	Alexei Nemov	Russia	9.800
6	Alexei Voropaev	Russia	9.762
7	Jesus Carballo	Spain	9.737
7	Lee Joo-Hyung	South Korea	9.737
