= Ukraine at the 1993 Summer Universiade =

- IOC code: UKR

in Buffalo 8–18 July 1993
- Competitors: 67 in 7 sports
- Officials: 25
- Medals Ranked 4th: Gold 11 Silver 6 Bronze 9 Total 26

Summer Universiade appearances (overview)
- 1993; 1995; 1997; 1999; 2001; 2003; 2005; 2007; 2009; 2011; 2013; 2015; 2017; 2019; 2021; 2025; 2027

Ukraine competed at the 1993 Summer Universiade in Buffalo, New York, United States, from 8 to 18 July 1993. Ukraine did not compete in baseball, football, tennis, volleyball, and water polo (though the country sent officials for the football, volleyball, and water polo competitions). Ukrainian women's basketball team finished 7th.

== Medal summary ==
=== Medal by sports ===
Medals by sport
Sport	1st place, gold medalist(s)	2nd place, silver medalist(s)	3rd place, bronze medalist(s)	Total
Artistic gymnastics	6	2	3	11
Athletics	2	1	3	6
Swimming	1	3	1	5
Fencing	1	0	0	1
Rowing	1	0	0	1
Diving	0	0	2	2
Total	11	6	9	26

=== Medalists ===
Medal	Name	Sport	Event
Gold	Oleksandr Klymenko	Athletics	Men's shot put
Gold	Vadym Kolesnyk	Athletics	Men's hammer throw
Gold	Serhiy Holubytskyi	Fencing	Men's individual foil
Gold	Ihor Korobchynskyi	Gymnastics	Men's floor exercises
Gold	Tetiana Lysenko	Gymnastics	Women's individual all-around
Gold	Natalia Kalinina	Gymnastics	Women's uneven bars
Gold	Natalia Kalinina	Gymnastics	Women's vault
Gold	Tetiana Lysenko	Gymnastics	Women's balance beam
Gold	Women's team	Gymnastics	Women's team all-around
Gold	Anton Prodan; Ihor Mohylniy; Kostyantyn Pronenko; Leonid Shaposhnikov	Rowing	Men's quadruple sculls
Gold	Svitlana Bondarenko	Swimming	Women's 200-metre breaststroke
Silver	Olha Leonenko	Athletics	Women's 10,000 metres walk
Silver	Ludmila Stovbchataya	Gymnastics	Women's individual all-around
Silver	Ludmila Stovbchataya	Gymnastics	Women's balance beam
Silver	Vyacheslav Valdayev	Swimming	Men's 200-metre individual medley
Silver	Vyacheslav Valdayev	Swimming	Men's 400-metre individual medley
Silver	Svitlana Bondarenko	Swimming	Women's 100-metre breaststroke
Bronze	Ruslan Stipanov	Athletics	Men's high jump
Bronze	Vitaliy Kyrylenko	Athletics	Men's long jump
Bronze	Larysa Hryhorenko	Athletics	Women's high jump
Bronze	Roman Volod'kov	Diving	Men's 3-meter springboard
Bronze	Roman Volod'kov	Diving	Men's 10-metre platform
Bronze	Ihor Korobchynskyi	Gymnastics	Men's individual all-around
Bronze	Ludmila Stovbchataya	Gymnastics	Women's uneven bars
Bronze	Ludmila Stovbchataya	Gymnastics	Women's floor exercises
Bronze	Pavlo Khnykin	Swimming	Men's 100-metre freestyle

== See also ==
- Ukraine at the 1993 Winter Universiade
