= 1992 European Men's Artistic Gymnastics Championships =

20th European Men's Artistic Gymnastics Championships
- Location: Budapest, Hungary
- Start date: 16 May 1992
- End date: 17 May 1992

The 20th European Men's Artistic Gymnastics Championships was held in Budapest, Hungary from 16–17 May 1992. This event was for male gymnasts at the senior level.

== Medalists ==
Event	Gold	Silver	Bronze
All-around	(Ukraine) Ihor Korobchynskyi	(Hungary) Zoltán Supola	(Belarus) Vitaly Scherbo
Floor	(Belarus) Vitaly Scherbo	(Ukraine) Ihor Korobchynskyi	(Italy) Jury Chechi (Russia) Sergey Kharkov
Pommel horse	(Ukraine) Ihor Korobchynskyi	(Belarus) Vitaly Scherbo	(Germany) Ralf Büchner
Rings	(Italy) Jury Chechi	(Belarus) Vitaly Scherbo	(Hungary) Szilveszter Csollány
Vault	(Belarus) Vitaly Scherbo	(Ukraine) Ihor Korobchynskyi	(Hungary) Zoltán Supola
Parallel bars	(Hungary) Zoltán Supola	(Ukraine) Ihor Korobchynskyi (Belarus) Vitaly Scherbo (Ukraine) Rustam Sharipov	Not awarded
Horizontal bar	(Ukraine) Rustam Sharipov (Germany) Andreas Wecker	Not awarded	(Romania) Nicu Stroia

=== Medal table ===
Rank	Nation	Gold	Silver	Bronze	Total
1	Ukraine (UKR)	3	4	0	7
2	Belarus (BLR)	2	3	1	6
3	Hungary (HUN)	1	1	2	4
4	Germany (GER)	1	0	1	2
4	Italy (ITA)	1	0	1	2
6	Romania (ROM)	0	0	1	1
6	Russia (RUS)	0	0	1	1
Totals (7 entries)		8	8	7	23

== Results ==
=== All Around ===
All competitors took part in the all-around with no prior qualification. Here are the top 10 finishes.

Rank	Athlete	Nation	Apparatus						Total
Rank	Athlete	Nation	F	PH	R	V	PB	HB	Total
1st place, gold medalist(s)	Ihor Korobchynskyi	Ukraine (UKR)	9.800	9.700	9.700	9.700	9.700	9.600	58.200
2nd place, silver medalist(s)	Zoltán Supola	Hungary (HUN)	9.600	9.600	9.600	9.600	9.850	9.450	57.700
3rd place, bronze medalist(s)	Vitaly Scherbo	Belarus (BLR)	9.600	9.750	9.800	9.600	9.700	9.150	57.600
4	Ralf Büchner	Germany (GER)	9.550	9.650	9.550	9.500	9.600	9.500	57.350
4	Alexander Kolyvanov	Russia (RUS)	9.600	9.800	9.550	9.400	9.550	9.450	57.350
4	Andreas Wecker	Germany (GER)	9.450	9.800	9.400	9.350	9.750	9.600	57.350
7	Jury Chechi	Italy (ITA)	9.600	9.500	9.800	9.050	9.700	9.500	57.150
8	Sergey Kharkov	Russia (RUS)	9.600	9.500	9.750	9.450	9.650	9.150	57.100
9	Dimitri Karbanenko	Russia (RUS)	9.550	9.600	9.500	9.300	9.650	9.450	57.050
9	Rustam Sharipov	Ukraine (UKR)	9.550	9.400	9.650	9.100	9.700	9.650	57.050

=== Floor ===
Rank	Gymnast	Total
1st place, gold medalist(s)	(Belarus) Vitaly Scherbo	9.750
2nd place, silver medalist(s)	(Ukraine) Ihor Korobchynskyi	9.725
3rd place, bronze medalist(s)	(Italy) Jury Chechi	9.625
3rd place, bronze medalist(s)	(Russia) Sergey Kharkov	9.625
5	(Germany) Ralf Büchner	9.500
6	(Hungary) Zoltán Supola	9.462
7	(Russia) Alexander Kolyvanov	9.450
8	(Bulgaria) Ivan Ivanov	9.400

=== Pommel horse ===
Rank	Gymnast	Total
1st place, gold medalist(s)	(Ukraine) Ihor Korobchynskyi	9.825
2nd place, silver medalist(s)	(Belarus) Vitaly Scherbo	9.812
3rd place, bronze medalist(s)	(Germany) Ralf Büchner	9.712
4	(Hungary) Szilveszter Csollány	9.675
5	(Russia) Dimitri Karbanenko	9.650
6	(Hungary) Miklós Pánczél	9.637
7	(Russia) Alexander Kolyvanov	9.375
8	(Germany) Andreas Wecker	9.250

=== Rings ===
Rank	Gymnast	Total
1st place, gold medalist(s)	(Italy) Jury Chechi	9.862
2nd place, silver medalist(s)	(Belarus) Vitaly Scherbo	9.812
3rd place, bronze medalist(s)	(Hungary) Szilveszter Csollány	9.800
4	(Ukraine) Rustam Sharipov	9.775
5	(Russia) Sergey Kharkov	9.737
5	(Germany) Marius Tobă	9.737
7	(Hungary) Zoltán Supola	9.700
8	(Spain) Alfonso Rodríguez	9.662

=== Vault ===
Rank	Gymnast	Total
1st place, gold medalist(s)	(Belarus) Vitaly Scherbo	9.706
2nd place, silver medalist(s)	(Ukraine) Ihor Korobchynskyi	9.687
3rd place, bronze medalist(s)	(Hungary) Zoltán Supola	9.606
4	(Germany) Ralf Büchner	9.600
5	(Belarus) Ivan Ivankov	9.587
6	(Russia) Sergey Kharkov	9.500
7	(Hungary) Szilveszter Csollány	9.450
8	(United Kingdom) James May	4.700

=== Parallel bars ===
Rank	Gymnast	Total
1st place, gold medalist(s)	(Hungary) Zoltán Supola	9.800
2nd place, silver medalist(s)	(Ukraine) Ihor Korobchynskyi	9.712
2nd place, silver medalist(s)	(Belarus) Vitaly Scherbo	9.712
2nd place, silver medalist(s)	(Ukraine) Rustam Sharipov	9.712
5	(Russia) Dimitri Karbanenko	9.662
6	(Russia) Sergey Kharkov	9.612
7	(Germany) Andreas Wecker	9.600
8	(Italy) Jury Chechi	9.587

=== Horizontal bar ===
Rank	Gymnast	Total
1st place, gold medalist(s)	(Ukraine) Rustam Sharipov	9.837
1st place, gold medalist(s)	(Germany) Andreas Wecker	9.837
3rd place, bronze medalist(s)	(Romania) Nicu Stroia	9.725
4	(Sweden) Johan Jonasson	9.712
5	(Germany) Ralf Büchner	9.700
6	(Slovenia) Alojz Kolman	9.637
7	(Hungary) Miklós Pánczél	8.962
8	(Romania) Alexandru Ciuca	8.700
