= Gymnastics at the 1993 Summer Universiade =

Gymnastics competition

Gymnastics at the XVII Summer Universiade
- Venue: Niagara Falls Convention and Civic Center

The gymnastics competition in the 1993 Summer Universiade were held in Buffalo, New York, United States.

== Medal table ==
Rank	Nation	Gold	Silver	Bronze	Total
1	Ukraine (UKR)	6	2	3	11
2	China (CHN)	2	2	0	4
3	Belarus (BLR)	2	1	1	4
3	Italy (ITA)	2	1	1	4
5	Belgium (BEL)	1	0	1	2
6	France (FRA)	1	0	0	1
7	United States (USA)	0	4	3	7
8	Japan (JPN)	0	2	1	3
9	South Korea (KOR)	0	1	1	2
10	Brazil (BRA)	0	1	0	1
11	Chinese Taipei (TPE)	0	0	2	2
11	Russia (RUS)	0	0	2	2
Totals (12 entries)		14	14	15	43

== Artistic gymnastics ==
=== Men's events ===
Event	Gold	Silver	Bronze
Individual all-around	Vitaly Scherbo; Belarus	Jury Chechi; Italy	Ihor Korobchynskyi; Ukraine
Team all-around	Italy (ITA)	China (CHN)	United States (USA)
Rings	Jury Chechi; Italy	Scott Keswick; United States	Ruggero Rossato; Italy; Dmitri Trush; Russia
Bar	Chen Jian; China	Scott Keswick; United States	Vitaly Scherbo; Belarus
Parallel bar	Wang Xun; China	Vitaly Scherbo; Belarus	Jair Lynch; United States
Vault	Vitaly Scherbo; Belarus	Yeo Hong-chul; South Korea	Chang Feng-chih; Chinese Taipei
Floor	Ihor Korobchynskyi; Ukraine	Daisuke Nishikawa; Japan	Yury Gotov; Russia
Pommel horse	Éric Poujade; France	Fan Bin; China	Chang Feng-chih; Chinese Taipei

=== Women's events ===
Event	Gold	Silver	Bronze
Individual all-around	Tatiana Lysenko; Ukraine	Ludmila Stovbchataya; Ukraine	Bénédicte Evrard; Belgium
Team all-around	Ukraine (UKR)	United States (USA)	Japan (JPN)
Uneven bars	Natalia Kalinina; Ukraine	Seo Kyoko; Japan	Ludmila Stovbchataya; Ukraine
Vault	Natalia Kalinina; Ukraine	Luísa Parente; Brazil	Hope Sheeley; United States
Floor	Bénédicte Evrard; Belgium	Tammy Marhall; United States	Ludmila Stovbchataya; Ukraine
Balance beam	Tatiana Lysenko; Ukraine	Ludmila Stovbchataya; Ukraine	Han Na-jung; South Korea

== External sources ==
- Gymnastics results of the 1993 Summer Universiade
