= Andreea Cacovean =

Romanian artistic gymnast

- Born: 15 September 1978 (age 47) Turda, Romania

Gymnastics career
- Discipline: Women's artistic gymnastics
- Country represented: Romania (1991-1996 (ROM))
- Club: Deva National Training Center
- Head coach: Maria Bitang
- Assistant coach: Octavian Bellu
- Retired: 1996
Medal record
World Championships
Gold medal – first place	1995 Sabae	Team
Bronze medal – third place	1993 Birmingham	Uneven bars
European Championships
Gold medal – first place	1996 Birmingham	Team

Andreea Cacovean (born 15 September 1978) is a former Romanian artistic gymnast who competed between 1991 and 1996. She is the 1995 World Champion with the team and the 1993 World bronze medalist on uneven bars. She also won a gold medal with the Romanian team at the 1996 European Championships.

== Career ==
Cacovean made her international debut at the 1991 Junior Balkan Championships, and won the silver medal in the all-around behind teammate Nadia Hațegan. At the 1992 Junior European Championships, she won the gold medal with the Romanian team as well as the silver medal in the all-around.

Cacovean tied for the gold medal in the all-around with Jana Günther at the 1993 Cottbus International, and she won the bronze medal on the floor exercise. She also won the gold medal in the all-around at the Golden Sands International. She placed fifth in the all-around at the International Championships of Romania. Then at the Junior European Championships, she won six medals- a gold medal on the uneven bars, a silver medal in the all-around, a silver medal on the balance beam, a bronze medal with the team, a bronze medal on vault, and a bronze medal on the floor exercise. She competed at the 1993 World Championships and won the bronze medal on the uneven bars behind Americans Shannon Miller and Dominique Dawes.

Cacovean went to a 1994 friendly meet against the United States, but she only competed in the floor exercise. She competed in the floor exercise and the uneven bars at the 1994 World Championships, but did not advance past the qualification round.

At the 1995 French International, Cacovean won the silver medal in the all-around behind Svetlana Khorkina. She won another silver medal in the all-around at the Ostrava International, this time behind teammate Gina Gogean. At a friendly meet against Germany, she helped the Romanian team win the gold medal, and she finished third in the all-around. She competed at the 1995 World Championships alongside Simona Amânar, Gina Gogean, Nadia Hațegan, Alexandra Marinescu, Lavinia Miloșovici, and Claudia Presăcan, and they won the gold medal in the team event.

Cacovean competed at the 1996 European Championships and won a gold medal with the Romanian team. She retired in 1996 due to a back injury, and she is currently a coach.
