= Pánczél =

Pánczél is a surname. Notable people with the surname include:

- Károly Pánczél (born 1961), Hungarian politician
- Miklós Pánczél (born 1971), Hungarian gymnast
