= Gymnastics at the 1996 Summer Olympics – Men's rings =

Olympic gymnastics event

Men's rings at the Games of the XXVI Olympiad
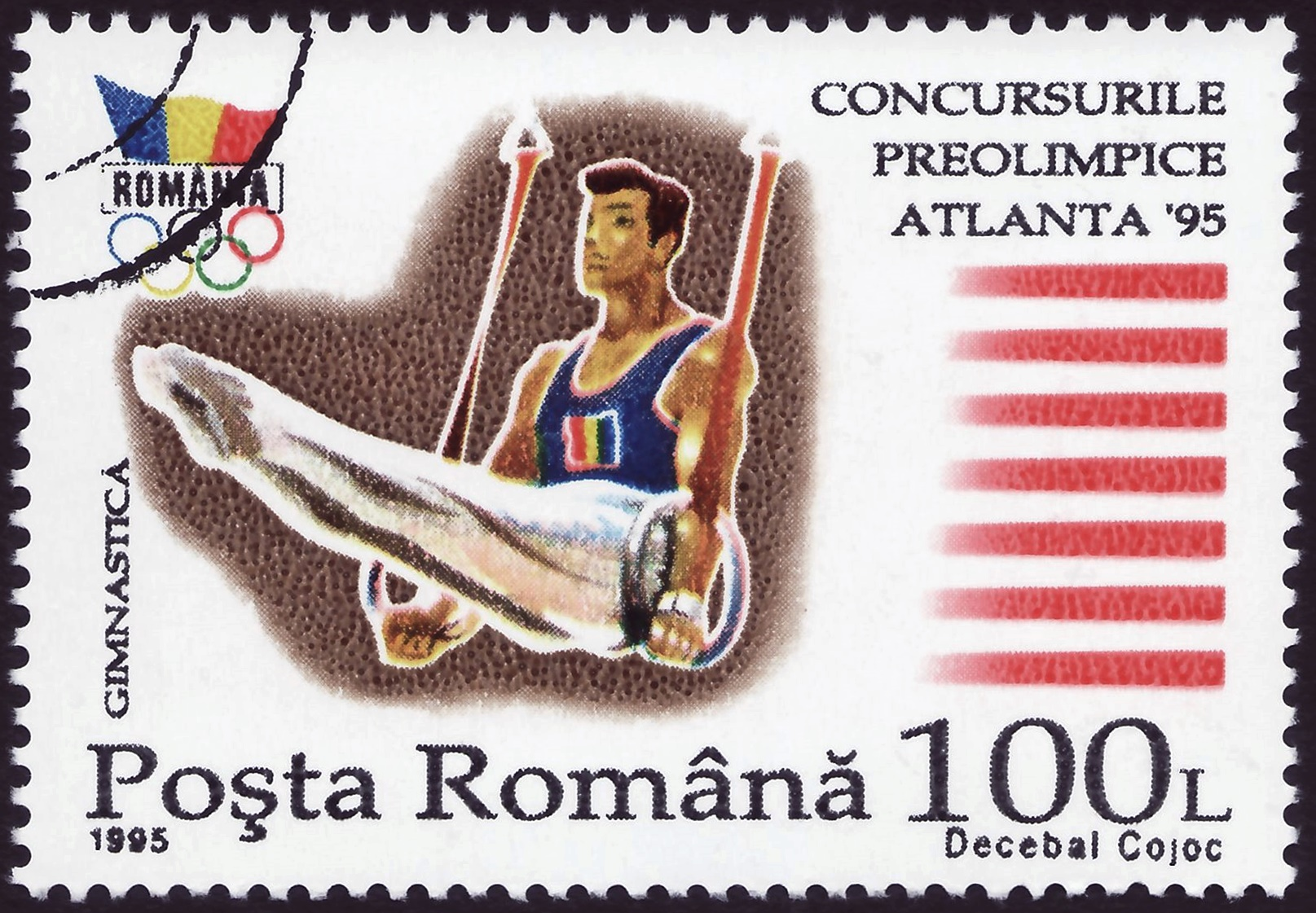
- Romanian stamp commemorating 1996 Olympic gymnastics depicting a man competing on the rings
- Venue: Georgia Dome
- Dates: 20–28 July 1996
- Competitors: 102 from 31 nations
- Winning score: 9.887

Medalists
1st place, gold medalist(s)		Jury Chechi; Italy
2nd place, silver medalist(s)		Szilveszter Csollány; Hungary
2nd place, silver medalist(s)		Dan Burincă; Romania

The men's rings competition was one of eight events for male competitors in artistic gymnastics at the 1996 Summer Olympics in Atlanta. The qualification and final rounds took place on July 20, 22 and 28th at the Georgia Dome. There were 102 competitors from 31 nations, with nations in the team event having up to 7 gymnasts (under the "7-6-5" system unique to 1996, teams had 7 gymnasts, designated 6 for each apparatus with 5 to count; however, all 7 could compete on each apparatus for individual purposes) and other nations having up to 3 gymnasts. The event was won by Jury Chechi of Italy, the nation's first victory in the men's rings since 1924 (and second overall) and first medal in the event since 1964. There was a tie for silver, between Szilveszter Csollány of Hungary and Dan Burincă of Romania. It was the best result so far for either nation; Romania had previously had a bronze medalist but this was Hungary's first trip to the podium in the rings.

== Background ==
This was the 19th appearance of the event, which is one of the five apparatus events held every time there were apparatus events at the Summer Olympics (no apparatus events were held in 1900, 1908, 1912, or 1920). Six of the eight finalists from 1992 returned: gold medalist Vitaly Scherbo of the Unified Team (now competing for Belarus), bronze medalists Li Xiaoshuang of China and Andreas Wecker of Germany, fifth-place finisher Valery Belenky of the Unified Team (now competing for Germany), sixth-place finisher Szilveszter Csollány of Hungary, and eighth-pace finisher (and 1988 finalist) Kalofer Hristozov of Bulgaria. Jury Chechi of Italy was the clear favorite in the event, having won all four of the world championships since the last Games.

Armenia, Barbados, Belarus, Croatia, the Czech Republic, Georgia, Iceland, Ireland, Kazakhstan, Russia, and Ukraine each made their debut in the men's rings. Greece competed for the first time since 1896. The United States made its 17th appearance, most of any nation; the Americans had missed only the inaugural 1896 rings and the boycotted 1980 Games.

== Competition format ==
The 1996 gymnastics competition introduced the "7–6–5" format, in which each team had 7 members, designated 6 for each apparatus, and had 5 count for team scores. However, all 7 could compete on each apparatus for individual competition purposes. Other nations could enter up to 3 individual gymnasts. All entrants in the gymnastics competitions performed both a compulsory exercise and a voluntary exercise for each apparatus (except for any apparatus in which a team member was not competing). The scores for all 12 exercises were summed to give an individual all-around qualifying score for those gymnasts competing on every apparatus. These exercise scores were also used for qualification for the apparatus finals. The two exercises (compulsory and voluntary) for each apparatus were summed to give an apparatus score. The top eight gymnasts, with a limit of two per nation, advanced to the final. Non-finalists were ranked 9th through 102nd based on preliminary score. The preliminary score had no effect on the final; once the eight finalists were selected, their ranking depended only on the final exercise.

== Schedule ==
All times are Eastern Daylight Time (UTC-4)

Date	Time	Round
Saturday, 20 July 1996		Preliminary: Compulsory
Monday, 22 July 1996		Preliminary: Voluntary
Sunday, 28 July 1996	23:19	Final

== Results ==
=== Qualifying ===
102 gymnasts competed in the rings event during the compulsory and optional rounds on July 20 and 22. The eight highest scoring gymnasts advanced to the final on July 28. Each country was limited to two competitors in the final.

=== Final ===
Rank	Gymnast	Nation	Score
1st place, gold medalist(s)	Jury Chechi	Italy	9.887
2nd place, silver medalist(s)	Szilveszter Csollány	Hungary	9.812
2nd place, silver medalist(s)	Dan Burincă	Romania	9.812
4	Yordan Yovchev	Bulgaria	9.800
5	Andreas Wecker	Germany	9.762
5	Fan Hongbin	China	9.762
7	Marius Toba	Germany	9.737
7	Blaine Wilson	United States	9.737
