= Ron Kaplan =

Israeli artistic gymnast

Ron Kaplan רון קפלן
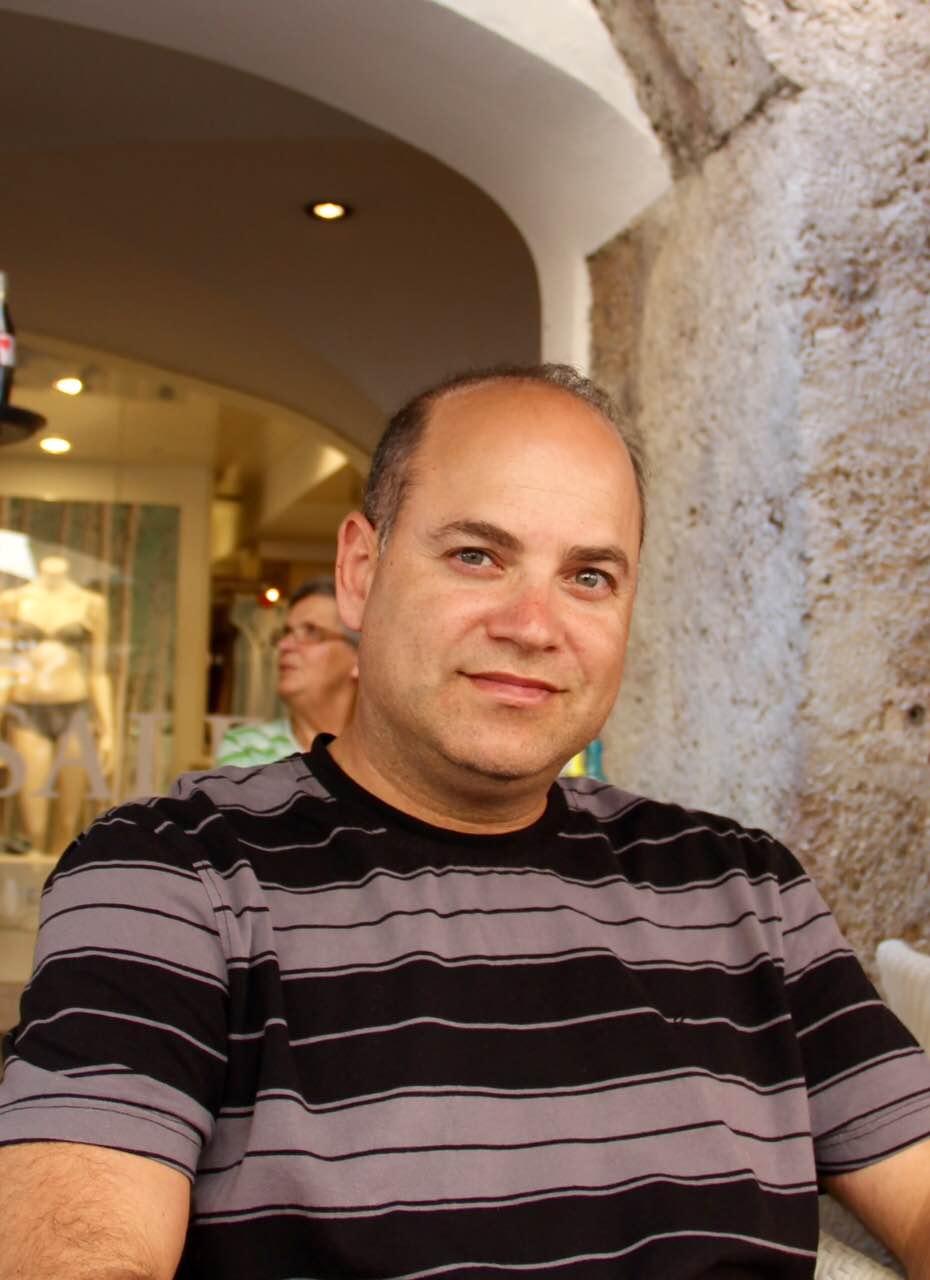
- Ron Kaplan

Personal information
- Full name: Ron Kaplan
- Born: May 1, 1970 (age 56)

Gymnastics career
- Discipline: Men's artistic gymnastics
- Country represented: Israel
Medal record
Representing Israel
Maccabiah Games
Gold medal – first place	1989 Israel	Individual All-Around

Ron Kaplan (Hebrew: רון קפלן; born May 1, 1970) is an Israeli former Olympic gymnast.

A four-time national champion, he won a gold medal for Israel in the 1989 Maccabiah Games. He also competed for Israel in two European Men's Artistic Gymnastics Championships, as well as four World Artistic Gymnastics Championships, and represented Israel at the 1992 Summer Olympics.

== Early life ==
Kaplan was born in Beer Sheva, Israel, and is Jewish. He attended UCLA, and competed as a gymnast for the Bruins. He served in the Israel Defense Forces.

== Israeli champion ==
Kaplan was the Israeli individual all-around gymnastics champion from 1989–92, for club teams from Beer Sheva and Holon.

== Maccabiah Games ==
In the 1989 Maccabiah Games, at the age of 19, Kaplan won a gold medal for Israel in the individual all-around competition.

== European Championships ==
In 1990, Kaplan finished in 33rd place in the individual all-around at the European Men's Artistic Gymnastics Championships (the highest finish in Israel's history), and in 1992 he finished in 27th place.

== World Championships ==
Kaplan competed at the World Artistic Gymnastics Championships in 1989, placing 82nd in the individual all-around. In 1991 he placed 64th in the individual all-around, in 1993 he placed 67th in the individual all-around, and in 1994 he came in 54th in the individual all-around.

== Olympics ==
Kaplan represented Israel at the 1992 Summer Olympics in Barcelona, Spain, in gymnastics at the age of 22. In the Men's Individual All-Around, he came in 65th, out of 93 gymnasts, with a score of 122.250. His best events were the Men's Floor Exercise, in which he came in tied for 36th, and the Men's Rings, in which he came in tied for 47th.

== TV commentator ==
After Kaplan retired from gymnastic competition, he became a TV commentator in Israel.
