= Silvia Mitova =

Bulgarian artistic gymnast (born 1976)

- Full name: Silvia Mitova
- Born: June 17, 1976 (age 50) Sofia, Bulgaria

Gymnastics career
- Discipline: Women's artistic gymnastics
- Country represented: Bulgaria
- Club: Levski Sofia
- Retired: 1992
Medal record
Women's artistic gymnastics
Representing Bulgaria
European Championships
Bronze medal – third place	1992 Nantes	Vault

Silvia Zarkova Mitova (later Hutchinson, Bulgarian: Силвия Заркова Митова, born 29 June 1976) is a retired Bulgarian artistic gymnast. She is a five-time Bulgarian Champion, the 1991 European junior silver medalist, and the 1992 European vault bronze medalist. She competed at the 1992 Summer Olympics. Mitova now coaches in the United States.

== Personal life ==
Mitova's mother, Maya Blagoeva, was an Olympic gymnast, and her father was a coach for the Bulgarian Olympic team in 1992. She has one brother. Mitova was named for her mother's friend, Silviya Topalova, another artistic gymnast who competed at the 1980 Summer Olympics.

In 2001, she married Artie Hutchinson and changed her last name. Their daughter, Jessica Hutchinson, is also an artistic gymnast; Mitova coached her for several years before transitioning coaching duties to her parents. Jessica competed for Bulgaria before moving to collegiate gymnastics, where she competed for the University of Denver.

== Career ==
Mitova began gymnastics when she was seven and was coached by her parents, though they had tried to interest her in other sports instead. She was successful as a junior; she was 4th in the all-around at the 1990 junior European Championships and second at the same competition the next year. Mitova was particularly known for her style on the floor exercise.

Mitova competed at the 1991 World Championships, where she qualified for the floor exercise final and finished 6th. She also competed at the 1992 World Championships and qualified for three event finals, with her best finished being 4th on beam. At the 1992 European Championships, she won the bronze medal on vault and also placed 4th in the floor exercise final. Her last competition was the 1992 Summer Olympics, where she finished 11th in the all-around and qualified for the floor final, where she was 8th.

One month after the 1992 Olympics, Mitova received a serious neck injury while training on a trampoline; she was attempting a double-twisting double salto into a foam pit, but she fell on her head and dislocated two vertabrae. Mitova said she thought she landed on a tire that lined the pit, as the gym could not afford to fill it completely with foam, instead of on a foam mat.

She was paralyzed by the accident, but she had surgery and returned home to work on regaining her mobility. By the end of the year, she could walk "slowly, and with help most of the time". Although she needed further surgery abroad, political circumstances made traveling difficult. However, in May 1993, she received permission to receive surgery in South Africa. The surgery was done for free, and her stay and the coverage of all costs were coordinated by the father of a South African gymnast, Heidi-Marie Oosthuizen, who Mitova had befriended in 1992. She remained in South Africa for three months. The surgery successfully restored feeling in her hands, and Mitova was thereafter able to walk unassisted.

In 1994, Mitova graduated from high school and began studying to become a coach. However, her family moved to the United States in 1995 after her parents received a coaching job there. She enrolled in business management at the Reading Area Community College, began coaching, and trained as a judge. Currently, she runs the Silvia's Gymnastics gym in Pennsylvania, where she coaches with her mother. She has carried out exchanges with South African gymnasts, also with the help Oosthuizen's father.
