= Luo Li =

Chinese gymnast (born 1976)

- Full name: Luo Li (罗丽)
- Born: 1976 (age 49–50) Guizhou

Gymnastics career
- Discipline: Women's artistic gymnastics
- Country represented: China
- Retired: 1995
Medal record
Women's artistic gymnastics
Representing China
World Championships
Gold medal – first place	1994 Brisbane	Uneven bars
National Games
Gold medal – first place	1993 Beijing	Uneven bars

Luo Li (born 1976) is a Chinese gymnast. Luo competed at the 1994 World Artistic Gymnastics Championships, winning a gold medal in uneven bars. At those Championships, she received the highest score of the competition, a 9.912, on her way to the gold medal. She retired in 1995.

== Eponymous skill ==
Luo has one eponymous skill listed in the Code of Points.

Apparatus	Name	Description	Difficulty (Note: Valid for the 2025–2028 Code of Points)
Uneven bars	Luo	Stoop in, pike circle forward through clear extended support to finish in L grip (jam to handstand)	E (0.5)
