= Natalia Bobrova =

Russian artistic gymnast (1978–2015)

Medal record

Representing Russia

Artistic Gymnastics

World Championships
Bronze medal – third place	1993 Birmingham	Floor Exercise

Natalia Bobrova (24 August 1978 – 2 April 2015) was an artistic gymnast from Russia. She won the bronze medal on floor exercise at the 1993 World Championships, the first women's world championship medal for independent Russia. She died of stomach cancer in Tel Aviv in April 2015.

== Competitive history ==
Year	Event	Team	AA	VT	UB	BB	FX
1993	World Championships		19th				3rd
1995	World Championships	4th					

Year	Competition Description	Location	Apparatus	Rank-Final	Score-Final	Rank-Qualifying	Score-Qualifying
1995	World Championships	Sabae	Team	4	384.689		
1995	World Championships	Sabae	Vault			29	18.787
1995	World Championships	Sabae	Uneven Bars			23	19.187
1995	World Championships	Sabae	Balance Beam			23	18.949
1993	World Championships	Birmingham	All-Around	19	36.974	14	37.936
1993	World Championships	Birmingham	Vault			72	9.162
1993	World Championships	Birmingham	Uneven Bars			15	9.487
1993	World Championships	Birmingham	Balance Beam			11	9.637
1993	World Championships	Birmingham	Floor Exercise	3	9.712	8	9.650
