= Li Donghua =

Swiss gymnast (born 1967)

Li Donghua 李东华
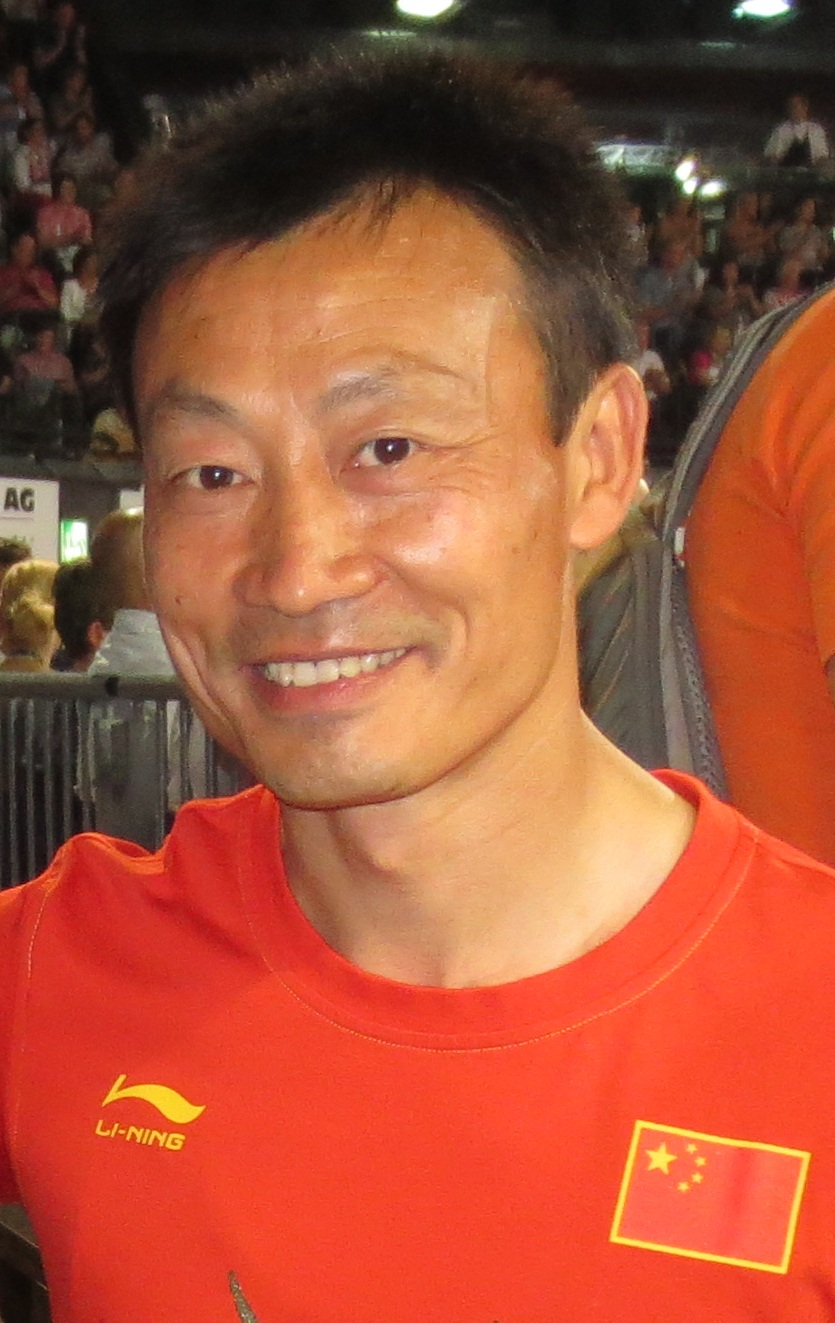
- Donghua Li in 2013

Personal information
- Full name: Li Donghua
- Born: 10 December 1967 (age 58) Chengdu, China

Gymnastics career
- Discipline: Men's artistic gymnastics
- Country represented: Switzerland
- Former countries represented: China
Medal record
Representing Switzerland
Olympic Games
Gold medal – first place	1996 Atlanta	Pommel horse
World Championships
Gold medal – first place	1995 Sabae	Pommel horse
Silver medal – second place	1996 San Juan	Pommel horse
Bronze medal – third place	1994 Brisbane	Pommel horse
European Championships
Gold medal – first place	1996 Copenhagen	Pommel horse

Li Donghua
- Simplified Chinese: 李东华
- Traditional Chinese: 李東華
Transcriptions
Standard Mandarin
- Hanyu Pinyin: Lǐ Dōnghuá

Li Donghua (born 10 December 1967) is a gymnast who represented his adopted country of Switzerland at the 1996 Summer Olympics in Atlanta, where he won the gold medal on the pommel horse.

== Gymnastics career ==
Li began his gymnastics career competing for China, and won a national title on the pommel horse in 1987. However, a neck injury prevented him from making the Chinese team for the 1988 Olympics.

While recovering from his injury, Li met Esperanza Friedli, a Swiss national who was backpacking in China. When he told his coaches he was to marry her, they told him to cut off the relationship or he would not be able to compete. He refused, and the couple left China for Lucerne.

Li went on to win the Swiss national title on pommel horse from 1989 to 1992, and the all-around national title in 1993. However, because he was not a Swiss national during that time, those results were not official. In 1994, he became a Swiss citizen and began competing for the country internationally.

At the 1994 World Artistic Gymnastics Championship, Li won a bronze medal on pommel horse. The next year, he won gold on the same event. In 1996, at the age of 28, he won both the European and Olympic pommel horse titles. Li was the first Olympic medalist for Switzerland in gymnastics since 1952.

== Personal life ==
Li and Friedli were married in 1988 and divorced in 2004. Li later married Qiang Huang. He has two children.

== See also ==
- Nationality changes in gymnastics

Awards
Preceded by (Switzerland) Tony Rominger	Swiss Sportsman of the Year; 1995 – 1996	Succeeded by (Switzerland) Michael von Grünigen
