= Paul O'Neill (gymnast) =

American artistic gymnast

- Born: May 8, 1965 (age 61)

Gymnastics career
- Discipline: Men's artistic gymnastics
- Country represented: United States
- Club: U.S. Olympic Training Center
- Head coaches: Ron Brant & Jim Holt
- Eponymous skills: O'Neill (rings)
Medal record
Men's artistic gymnastics
Representing United States
World Championships
Silver medal – second place	1994 Brisbane	Rings

Paul O'Neill (May 8, 1965 – January 22, 2021) was an American gymnast most noted for his work on rings.

== Early life and education ==
O'Neill was born to Evelyn and John O'Neill, the third of four sons. He attended Abraham Lincoln High School for two years and Aurora Central for one. He was a two-time Colorado high school wrestling champion and started gymnastics before his junior year. He was State Champion on rings in 1983.

== Gymnastics career ==
O'Neill went to Houston Baptist University from 1985 to 1987 and the University of New Mexico from 1987 to 1989. He was a three-time NCAA champion on rings, winning in 1987, 1988, and 1989, as well as holding the highest qualifying average record (9.93) in 1987 and 1989. After college, he went on to compete internationally.

O'Neill tore his bicep in 1990 and required an eight-month recovery period. He came fourth at the 1992 World Artistic Gymnastics Championships, the highest American male finisher, then became the first American man to win a medal at the world championships in 15 years when he won the silver medal in men's rings at the 1994 World Artistic Gymnastics Championships in Brisbane. He won the national rings title at the 1995 U.S. National Gymnastics Championships.

He retired from competition in 1997.

He was the owner and coach at Dakota Star Gymnastics in Mandan, North Dakota. In July 1997, he became program director at Technique Gymnastics outside of Sacramento, California which had 118 competitive team members and 850 total gymnasts.

O'Neill was USA Gymnastics' male athlete of the year in 1994 and The Bismarck Tribune's Sportsman of the Year in 1995.

USA Gymnastics placed O'Neill on its permanently ineligible list between early-2000 and May 2001.

=== Competitions ===
- World Championships, Brisbane, Australia - Silver Medalist
- World Championships, Paris, France - 4th (Rings)
- D.T.B Pokal, Stuttgart, Germany, 1995 - 3rd (Still Rings)
- D.T.B Pokal, Stuttgart, Germany, 1994 - 5th (Still Rings)
- Swiss Cup, Zurich, Switzerland, 1995 - 7th (Still Rings)
- Swiss Cup, Zurich, Switzerland, 1994 - 8th (Still Rings)
- Kosice Cup, Kosice, Slovakia, 1993 - 1st (Still Rings)

== Eponymous skills ==
O'Neill has one named element on the rings. It was initially given an E (0.5) difficulty score, but was lowered to a D (0.4) in 2024.

Gymnastics elements named after Paul O'Neill
Apparatus	Name	Description	Difficulty (Note: Valid for the 2025–2028 Code of Points)	Added to Code of Points
Rings	O'Neill	"Straight double felge bwd. to hang."	D, 0.4	Named in 1993. Performed at the 1992 World Artistic Gymnastics Championships

== Personal life ==
O'Neill was married to Kristi Kasprzak O'Neill and had three children.

He owned his own personal training company, and he has also done some acting and modeling. His hobbies include singing in a band. Paul died 01/22/2021.
