= Pyongyang Sinri Primary School =

School in Pyongyang, North Korea

- Chosŏn'gŭl: 평양신리소학교
- Hancha: 平壤新里小學校
- Revised Romanization: Pyeongyang Silli sohakgyo
- McCune–Reischauer: P'yŏngyang Silli sohakkyo

Pyongyang Sinri Primary School is a model primary school in Pyongyang, North Korea.

Prominent alumni include Pae Kil-su, Olympic pommel horse gold medalist in 1992.
