= Yelena Grudneva =

Russian gymnast (born 1974)

- Born: 21 February 1974 (age 52) Kemerovo, Russian SFSR, Soviet Union

Gymnastics career
- Discipline: Women's artistic gymnastics
- Club: Spartak Kemerovo
Medal record
Representing Unified Team
Olympic Games
Gold medal – first place	1992 Barcelona	Team
European Championships
Bronze medal – third place	1992 Nantes	Uneven Bars

Yelena Aleksandrovna Grudneva (Russian: Елена Александровна Груднева; born 21 February 1974) is a retired Russian gymnast. She competed at the 1992 Summer Olympics in all artistic gymnastics events and won a gold medal with the Unified Team. Individually her best result was ninth place on the balance beam. She won a bronze medal on the uneven bars in Nantes at the European championships in 1992.

== Competitive history ==
Year	Event	Team	AA	VT	UB	BB	FX
1992	European Championships				3rd		
1992	Olympic Games	1st					

- Competitor for CIS

Year	Competition Description	Location	Apparatus	Rank-Final	Score-Final	Rank-Qualifying	Score-Qualifying
1992	Olympic Games	Barcelona	Team	1	395.666		
1992	Olympic Games	Barcelona	All-Around			22	78.411
1992	Olympic Games	Barcelona	Vault			24	19.637
1992	Olympic Games	Barcelona	Uneven Bars			14	19.750
1992	Olympic Games	Barcelona	Balance Beam			9	19.687
1992	Olympic Games	Barcelona	Floor Exercise			43	19.337
1992	European Championships	Nantes	All-Around	10	38.849		
1992	European Championships	Nantes	Vault	5	9.887	8	9.850
1992	European Championships	Nantes	Uneven Bars	3	9.875	7	9.862
1992	European Championships	Nantes	Balance Beam	5	9.825	7	9.837
1992	European Championships	Nantes	Floor Exercise			47	9.300
