= Ludmila Prince =

Latvian artistic gymnast (born 1975)

Ludmila Prince (born 2 January 1975 in Riga) is a Latvian former artistic gymnast. She competed at the 1996 Summer Olympics.
