= Karin Szymko =

British artistic gymnast (born 1979)

- Born: 11 May 1979 (age 47) Merton, Greater London

Gymnastics career
- Discipline: Women's artistic gymnastics
- Country represented: Great Britain; England
Medal record
Women's artistic gymnastics
Representing England
Commonwealth Games
Gold medal – first place	1994 Victoria	Team event

Karin Szymko (born May 11, 1979 in Merton, Greater London) is a female British former artistic gymnast.

== Gymnastics career ==
Szymko represented England in four events at the 1994 Commonwealth Games in Victoria, British Columbia, Canada. She won a gold medal in the team event.
