= Dan Burincă =

Romanian artistic gymnast

- Born: 17 June 1972 (age 54) Sibiu

Gymnastics career
- Discipline: Men's artistic gymnastics
- Country represented: Romania
Medal record
Olympic Games
Silver medal – second place	1996 Atlanta	Rings
World Championships
Silver medal – second place	1995 Sabae	Rings
Bronze medal – third place	1994 Brisbane	Rings
Bronze medal – third place	1995 Sabae	Team

Dan Burincă (born 17 June 1972 in Sibiu, Romania) is a retired Romanian artistic gymnast who specialized in rings. He is a silver Olympic medalist and a multiple world medalist on rings. After retirement he coached at CSS Cetate Deva Romania and KTV Klagenfurt Austria. Currently, he is a coach at the CSS Sibiu Romania.
