= Snezhana Khristakieva =

Bulgarian gymnast (born 1977)

- Born: 11 March 1977 (age 49) Plovdiv, Bulgaria

Gymnastics career
- Discipline: Women's artistic gymnastics
- Country represented: Bulgaria
- Eponymous skills: Hristakieva (uneven bars)

Snezhana Khristakieva (Bulgarian: Снежана Христакиева; born 11 March 1977) is a Bulgarian gymnast. She competed at the 1992 Summer Olympics. She has a skill named after her on the uneven bars in the women's Code of Points - a Gienger with full turn, although it is almost universally referred to as a Def (its name in the Men's code of points). It is considered a challenging skill, with the highest difficulty value of G.

== Eponymous skill ==
Khristakieva has one eponymous uneven bars release move listed in the Code of Points.

Apparatus	Name	Description	Difficulty (Note: Valid for the 2025-2028 Code of Points)
Uneven bars	Hristakieva (Note: Also referred to as a Def)	Swing forward and salto backward with 1½ turn (540°) to hang on high bar	G (0.7)
