= Károly Schupkégel =

Hungarian gymnast

- Born: 4 July 1965 (age 61) Brașov, Romanian People's Republic
- Height: 1.57 m (5 ft 2 in)

Gymnastics career
- Discipline: Men's artistic gymnastics
- Country represented: Hungary
- Club: Ferencvárosi Torna Club

Károly Schupkégel (born 4 July 1965) is a Hungarian gymnast. He competed in eight events at the 1992 Summer Olympics.
