= Athletics at the 1993 Summer Universiade – Women's 10,000 metres walk =

The women's 10,000 metres walk event at the 1993 Summer Universiade was held at the UB Stadium in Buffalo, United States on 14 July 1993.

== Results ==
Rank	Athlete	Nationality	Time	Notes
1st place, gold medalist(s)	Long Yuwen	China	46:16.75	
2nd place, silver medalist(s)	Olga Leonenko	Ukraine	46:17.10	
3rd place, bronze medalist(s)	Larisa Ramazanova	Russia	46:18.47	
4	Rossella Giordano	Italy	46:18.62	
5	Zuzana Zemková	Slovakia	47:17.19	
6	Tina Poitras	Canada	48:02.52	
7	Pascale Grand	Canada	48:18.94	
8	Eva Machuca	Mexico	48:29.88	
9	Dana Yarbough	United States	48:55.4	
10	Vera Toporek	Austria	48:55	
11	Sara Standley	United States	49:04	
12	Jantien Saltet	Australia	49:17.56	
13	Anikó Szebenszky	Hungary	49:50	
14	Aida İsayeva	Azerbaijan	53:60	
