= Chang Feng-chih =

Taiwanese artistic gymnast

- Born: Taiwan

Gymnastics career
- Discipline: Men's artistic gymnastics
- Country represented: Chinese Taipei
Medal record
Men's artistic gymnastics
Representing Chinese Taipei
World Championships
Silver medal – second place	1993 Birmingham	Vault
Asian Games
Bronze medal – third place	1990 Beijing	Pommel Horse
Bronze medal – third place	1990 Beijing	Vault

Chang Feng-chih (Chinese: 張峰治) is a retired Taiwanese male artistic gymnast and at the 1993 World Artistic Gymnastics Championships in Birmingham he won the silver medal in the Vault event finals. In so doing, he became the first athlete representing Taiwan to win a World Championships medal in Gymnastics.
