= Oliver Walther =

German gymnast (born 1972)

- Born: 28 October 1972 (age 53) Halle, East Germany
- Height: 1.63 m (5 ft 4 in)

Gymnastics career
- Discipline: Men's artistic gymnastics
- Country represented: Germany
- Club: Sportverein Halle

Oliver Walther (born 28 October 1972) is a German gymnast. He competed at the 1992 Summer Olympics and the 1996 Summer Olympics.
