= Pae Gil-su =

North Korean artistic gymnast

- Born: March 4, 1972 (age 54) Tongdaewon-guyok, Pyongyang
- Height: 163 cm (5 ft 4 in)

Gymnastics career
- Discipline: Men's artistic gymnastics
- Country represented: North Korea
Medal record
Representing North Korea
Olympic Games
Gold medal – first place	1992 Barcelona	Pommel horse
World Championships
Gold medal – first place	1992 Paris	Pommel horse
Gold medal – first place	1993 Birmingham	Pommel horse
Gold medal – first place	1996 San Juan	Pommel horse
Bronze medal – third place	1997 Lausanne	Pommel horse
Asian Games
Gold medal – first place	1990 Beijing	Horizontal Bar
Gold medal – first place	1998 Bangkok	Pommel Horse
Bronze medal – third place	1990 Beijing	Pommel Horse

- Pae Gil-su
- Hangul: 배길수
- Hanja: 裵吉洙
- RR: Bae Gilsu
- MR: Pae Kilsu

Pae Gil-su (Korean: 배길수, also written Pae Kil-su, born March 4, 1972) is a North Korean gymnast.

He won the gold medal for the pommel horse at the 1992 Summer Olympics (tied with Vitaly Scherbo).

He also won the gold medal at the 27th, 28th and 32nd World Gymnastics Championships.

Pae attended Pyongyang Sinri Primary School and the Korean Physical Education College.
