= Miklós Pánczél =

Hungarian gymnast

- Born: 4 February 1971 (age 55) Dunaújváros, Hungarian People's Republic
- Height: 1.84 m (6 ft 0 in)

Gymnastics career
- Discipline: Men's artistic gymnastics
- Country represented: Hungary
- Club: Dunaferr Sportegyesület

Miklós Pánczél (born 4 February 1971) is a Hungarian gymnast. He competed in eight events at the 1992 Summer Olympics.
