= Arnold Bugár =

Slovak gymnast (born 1971)

- Born: 2 September 1971 (age 55) Bratislava, Czechoslovakia
- Height: 1.78 m (5 ft 10 in)

Gymnastics career
- Discipline: Men's artistic gymnastics
- Country represented: Czechoslovakia
- Club: TJ Vinohrady; ŠK Ružinov

Arnold Bugár (born 2 September 1971) is a Slovak gymnast. He competed in seven events at the 1992 Summer Olympics.
