= Jana Günther =

German gymnast

Personal information
- Nationality: German
- Born: 21 May 1975 (age 49); Rostock, Germany

Sport
- Sport: Gymnastics

Jana Günther (born 21 May 1975) is a German gymnast. She competed in six events at the 1992 Summer Olympics.
