= Sergey Kharkov =

Russian gymnast (born 1970)

Sergei Kharkov
- Alternative name: Sergej Charkov
- Born: 17 November 1970 (age 55)

Gymnastics career
- Discipline: Men's artistic gymnastics
- Country represented: Germany
- Former countries represented: Russia; Soviet Union
- Club: TG Saar
Medal record
Olympic Games
Representing Soviet Union
Gold medal – first place	1988 Seoul	Floor exercise
Gold medal – first place	1988 Seoul	Team
Representing Russia
Gold medal – first place	1996 Atlanta	Team
World Championships
Gold medal – first place	1993 Birmingham	Horizontal bar
Silver medal – second place	1993 Birmingham	All-around

Sergei Kharkov AKA Sergej Charkov (born 17 November 1970) is a Russian gymnast, Olympic champion and world champion. He competed for the Soviet Union and the Russian Federation before he immigrated to Germany, where he won the national championship eight times. Since retiring from competition, he coaches the TG Saar gymnastics team in Saarbrücken and performs in sport shows. Kharkov is married with two children and lives in Dillingen, Germany.

== Gymnastics career ==
=== Olympics ===
Kharkov competed for the Soviet Union at the 1988 Summer Olympics in Seoul, where he won gold medals in the team competition and floor exercise.

He competed for Russia at the 1996 Summer Olympics in Atlanta, where he won a gold medal in the team competition.

=== World championships ===
Kharkov won a gold medal in the horizontal bar and a silver medal in the individual all-around at the 1993 World Artistic Gymnastics Championships in Birmingham.

== Competitive record ==
- 1988 Olympic Games: 1st floor, 1st team
- 1990 European Championships: 2nd all around, 2nd floor, 3rd pommel horse
- 1992 European Championships: 1st team
- 1993 World Championships: 2nd all around, 1st high bar
- 1995 German Championships: 3rd all around, 1st floor, 1st vault, 1st parallel bars
- 1996 Olympic Games: 1st team
- 1997 German Championships: 1st all around, 2nd parallel bars, 3rd rings
- 1998 German Championships: 1st floor, 1st vault, 3rd high bar
- 1999 German Championships: 1st floor, 1st vault, 3rd high bar
- 2001 German Championships: 1st parallel bars, 2nd high bar, 3rd rings

== See also ==
- List of Olympic male artistic gymnasts for Russia
