= Michael Engeler =

Swiss gymnast

- Born: 18 June 1971 (age 55) St. Gallen, Switzerland
- Height: 1.72 m (5 ft 8 in)

Gymnastics career
- Discipline: Men's artistic gymnastics
- Country represented: Switzerland
- Gym: Turnverein Adliswil

Michael Engeler (born 18 June 1971) is a Swiss gymnast. He competed at the 1992 Summer Olympics and the 1996 Summer Olympics.
