= Kinga Horváth =

Hungarian gymnast

Personal information
- Nationality: Hungarian
- Born: 13 November 1976 (age 48); Budapest, Hungary

Sport
- Sport: Gymnastics

Kinga Horváth (born 13 November 1976) is a Hungarian gymnast. She competed in six events at the 1992 Summer Olympics.
