= Krasimir Dunev =

Bulgarian gymnast (born 1972)

- Красимир Николаев Дунев
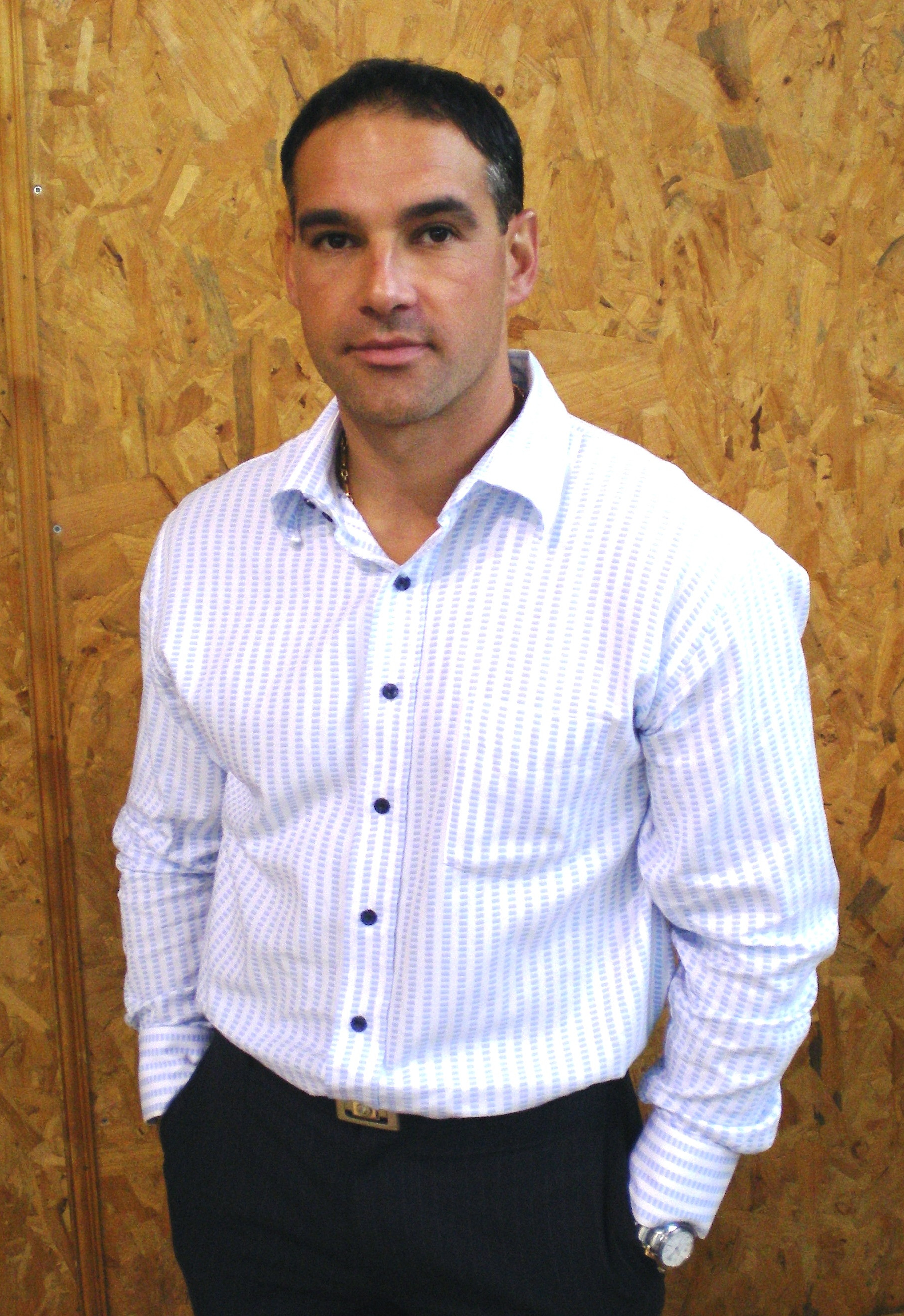
- Dunev in 2009

Personal information
- Full name: Krasimir Nikolaev Dunev
- Born: 11 September 1972 (age 53) Plovdiv, Bulgaria

Gymnastics career
- Discipline: Men's artistic gymnastics
- Country represented: Bulgaria
Medal record
Men's artistic gymnastics
Representing Bulgaria
Event	1st	2nd	3rd
Olympic Games	0	1	0
World Championships	0	1	1
European Championships	1	0	0
Total	1	2	1
Olympic Games
Silver medal – second place	1996 Atlanta	Horizontal bar
World Championships
Silver medal – second place	1996 San Juan	Horizontal bar
Bronze medal – third place	1995 Sabae	Horizontal bar
European Championships
Gold medal – first place	1996 Broendby	Horizontal bar

Krasimir Nikolaev Dunev (Bulgarian: Красимир Дунев) (born 11 September 1972) is a Bulgarian gymnast. He competed at the 1992 Summer Olympics and the 1996 Summer Olympics. He won a silver medal at the 1996 Olympics, in the men's horizontal bar.
