= Ludmila Stovbchataya =

Ukrainian gymnast

- Full name: Ludmila Petrovna Stovbchataya
- Born: 1 March 1974 (age 52) Odesa, Ukrainian SSR, Soviet Union

Gymnastics career
- Discipline: Women's artistic gymnastics
- Country represented: Ukraine
- Former countries represented: CIS ( Unified Team); Soviet Union
- Club: SKA Odesa
- Retired: 1993
Medal record
Representing Ukraine
European Championships
Bronze medal – third place	1992 Nantes	Balance beam
European Cup Final
Silver medal – second place	1993 Brussels	Balance beam
Summer Universiade
Gold medal – first place	1993 Buffalo	Team
Silver medal – second place	1993 Buffalo	All-around
Silver medal – second place	1993 Buffalo	Balance beam
Bronze medal – third place	1993 Buffalo	Uneven bars
Bronze medal – third place	1993 Buffalo	Floor exercise

Ludmila Petrovna Stovbchataya (Ukrainian: Людмила Петрівна Стовбчата; born March 1, 1974) is a Soviet and Ukrainian former gymnast who had her senior competitive career from 1990 to 1993. She competed for Ukraine at the 1992 European Championships and the 1993 World Championships.
