= Zoltán Supola (gymnast) =

Hungarian gymnast (born 1970)

- Born: 25 September 1970 (age 55) Dunaújváros, Hungarian People's Republic
- Height: 1.71 m (5 ft 7 in)

Gymnastics career
- Discipline: Men's artistic gymnastics
- Country represented: Hungary
Medal record
Representing Hungary
European Championships
Gold medal – first place	1992 Budapest	Parallel bars
Silver medal – second place	1992 Budapest	All-around
Bronze medal – third place	1992 Budapest	Vault

Zoltán Supola (born 25 September 1970) is a Hungarian gymnast. He competed at the 1992 Summer Olympics, the 1996 Summer Olympics and the 2000 Summer Olympics.
