= Andrea Molnár =

Hungarian gymnast

Personal information
- Nationality: Hungarian
- Born: 3 March 1975 (age 50); Budapest, Hungary

Sport
- Sport: Gymnastics

Andrea Molnár (born 3 March 1975) is a Hungarian gymnast. She competed at the 1992 Summer Olympics and the 1996 Summer Olympics.
