= Pavla Kinclová =

Czech gymnast

Personal information
- Nationality: Czech
- Born: 19 February 1975 (age 50); Zlín, Czechoslovakia

Sport
- Sport: Gymnastics

Pavla Kinclová (born 19 February 1975) is a Czech gymnast. She competed in five events at the 1992 Summer Olympics.
