= Han Yoon-soo =

South Korean gymnast (born 1973)

- 한윤수
- Alternative name: Han Yun-su
- Born: 8 February 1973 (age 53)

Gymnastics career
- Discipline: Men's artistic gymnastics
- Country represented: South Korea
- Club: Suwon City Hall
Medal record
Representing South Korea
Asian Games
Silver medal – second place	1994 Hiroshima	Team

Han Yoon-soo (born 8 February 1973) is a South Korean gymnast. He competed at the 1992 Summer Olympics and the 1996 Summer Olympics.
