= Valery Belenky =

Azerbaijani artistic gymnast (born 1969)

Valeri Belenki
- Full name: Valeri Vladimirovich Belenki
- Born: 5 September 1969 (age 57) Baku, Azerbaijan SSR, Soviet Union

Gymnastics career
- Discipline: Men's artistic gymnastics
- Country represented: Germany
- Former countries represented: Soviet Union
Medal record
Representing Soviet Union
World Championships
Gold medal – first place	1989 Stuttgart	Team
Gold medal – first place	1991 Indianapolis	Team
Gold medal – first place	1991 Indianapolis	Pommel Horse
Representing Unified Team
Olympic Games
Gold medal – first place	1992 Barcelona	Team
Bronze medal – third place	1992 Barcelona	All-around
World Championships
Bronze medal – third place	1992 Paris	Parallel bars
Representing Germany
World Championships
Gold medal – first place	1997 Lausanne	Pommel horse
Bronze medal – third place	1993 Birmingham	Parallel bars

Valeri Vladimirovich Belenki (Russian: Валерий Владимирович Беленький, German: Valeri Belenki; born 5 September 1969) is a retired Azerbaijani artistic gymnast who competed in the 1992 and 1996 Summer Olympics.

== Gymnastics career ==
Belenki was born and raised in Baku, Azerbaijan SSR, Soviet Union (present day Azerbaijan), in a Jewish family.

He competed for the Soviet Union/Unified Team until 1992, when this federation was disbanded following the breakup of the Soviet Union.

Belenki's greatest achievements are the team gold and all-around bronze he won with the Unified Team in the 1992 Olympics in Barcelona. Belenky also won gold in the pommel horse event at the 1991 World Artistic Gymnastics Championships, where he competed for the USSR.

Because Azerbaijan did not have a gymnastics federation for him to compete for in the 1993 world championships in Birmingham, Belenky instead competed as an unattached athlete. In 1994, he became a German citizen and represented that nation in the 1996 Olympics, helping the team to a seventh-place finish and coming 6th in the all-around.

In 2013, he was elected to the International Jewish Sports Hall of Fame. In 2015, he was inducted into the International Gymnastics Hall of Fame as a representative of Azerbaijan.
