= List of Olympic male artistic gymnasts for Ukraine =

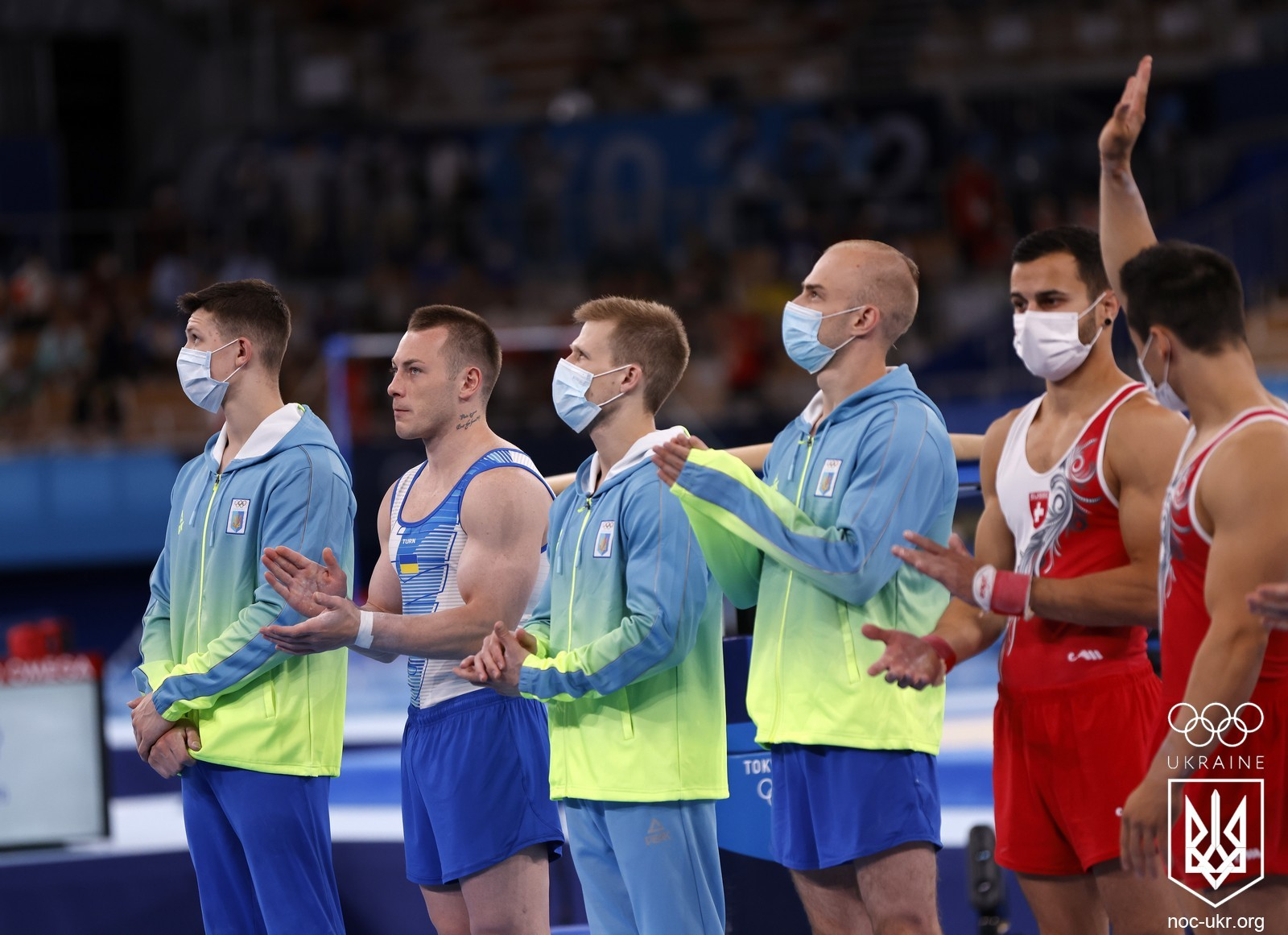
Ukrainian men at the 2020 Olympic Games

Ukrainian male artistic gymnasts have competed at every Olympic Games since 1996. Prior to this they competed as part of the Soviet Union.

== Gymnasts ==
Gymnast	Years
Oleksandr Beresch	2000
Yevhen Bohonosiuk	2004
Nazar Chepurnyi	2024
Valeriy Honcharov	2000, 2004, 2008
Vladyslav Hryko	2016
Ihor Korobchynskyi	1996
Oleg Kosyak	1996
Illia Kovtun	2020, 2024
Mykola Kuksenkov	2012
Vadym Kuvakin	2004
Ruslan Mezentsev	2000, 2004
Hryhoriy Misiutin	1996
Andriy Mykhailychenko	1996, 2004
Vitaliy Nakonechnyi	2012
Petro Pakhnyuk	2020
Valeriy Pereshkura	2000
Igor Radivilov	2012, 2016, 2020, 2024
Maksym Semiankiv	2016
Volodymyr Shamenko	1996
Rustam Sharipov	1996
Andriy Sienichkin	2016
Radomyr Stelmakh	2024
Oleg Stepko	2012
Oleksandr Svitlychniy	1996, 2000
Oleg Verniaiev	2012, 2016, 2024
Oleksandr Vorobiov	2008
Yuriy Yermakov	1996
Yevhen Yudenkov	2020
Roman Zozulia	2000, 2004

== Medalists ==
Medal	Name	Year	Event
Bronze	Korobchynskyi, Kosyak, Misutin, Shamenko, Sharipov, Svitlichni, Yermakov	(United States) 1996 Atlanta	Men's team
Gold	Rustam Sharipov	(United States) 1996 Atlanta	Men's parallel bars
Silver	Beresh, Goncharov, Mezentsev, Pereshkura, Svitlichni, Zozulya	(Australia) 2000 Sydney	Men's team
Bronze	Oleksandr Beresh	(Australia) 2000 Sydney	Men's all-around
Gold	Valeriy Honcharov	(Greece) 2004 Athens	Men's parallel bars
Bronze	Oleksandr Vorobiov	(China) 2008 Beijing	Men's rings
Bronze	Igor Radivilov	(United Kingdom) 2012 London	Men's vault
Silver	Oleg Verniaiev	(Brazil) 2016 Rio de Janeiro	Men's all-around
Gold	Oleg Verniaiev	(Brazil) 2016 Rio de Janeiro	Men's parallel bars
Silver	Illia Kovtun	(France) 2024 Paris	Men's parallel bars

== See also ==
- List of Olympic female artistic gymnasts for Ukraine
