= Ukraine at the World Artistic Gymnastics Championships =

- Flag of Ukraine
- IOC code: UKR
- Website: ugf.org.ua
- Medals: Gold 7 Silver 13 Bronze 20 Total 40

Ukraine first competed at the 1993 World Championships, after the fall of the Soviet Union. Despite being very successful in the team events as the Soviet Union, Ukrainian athletes have primarily had individual success at the World Championships. The Chinese women originally won the bronze medal in the team event at the 1999 World Championships; however their medal was stripped in 2010 after it was discovered that Dong Fangxiao's age was falsified at the time of the competition. The Ukrainian women's team, who originally finished fourth, was then awarded the bronze medal.

== Medalists ==
Medal	Name	Year	Event
Bronze	Tatiana Lysenko	(United Kingdom) 1993 Birmingham	Women's all-around
Gold	Hrihoriy Misyutin	(United Kingdom) 1993 Birmingham	Men's floor exercise
Silver	Ihor Korobchynskyi	(United Kingdom) 1993 Birmingham	Men's parallel bars
Bronze	Rustam Charipov, Yuri Ermakov, Ihor Korobchynskyi, Vitaly Marinich, Hrihoriy Misyutin, Volodymyr Shamenko, Andrei Stepanchenko	(Germany) 1994 Dortmund	Men's team
Bronze	Vitaly Marinich	(Australia) 1994 Brisbane	Men's pommel horse
Silver	Lilia Podkopayeva	(Australia) 1994 Brisbane	Women's balance beam
Silver	Rustam Sharipov	(Australia) 1994 Brisbane	Men's parallel bars
Gold	Lilia Podkopayeva	(Japan) 1995 Sabae	Women's all-around
Bronze	Hrihoriy Misyutin	(Japan) 1995 Sabae	Men's floor exercise
Gold	Lilia Podkopayeva	(Japan) 1995 Sabae	Women's vault
Silver	Lilia Podkopayeva	(Japan) 1995 Sabae	Women's uneven bars
Gold	Hrihoriy Misyutin	(Japan) 1995 Sabae	Men's vault
Silver	Lilia Podkopayeva	(Japan) 1995 Sabae	Women's balance beam
Bronze	Hrihoriy Misyutin	(Puerto Rico) 1996 San Juan	Men's floor exercise
Gold	Rustam Sharipov	(Puerto Rico) 1996 San Juan	Men's parallel bars
Bronze	Liubov Sheremeta	(Puerto Rico) 1996 San Juan	Women's floor exercise
Bronze	Oleksandr Beresch	(Switzerland) 1997 Lausanne	Men's horizontal bar
Bronze	Viktoria Karpenko, Tetiana Yarosh, Inga Shkarupa, Olha Teslenko, Olha Rozshchupkina, Nataliya Horodny	(China) 1999 Tianjin	Women's team
Silver	Viktoria Karpenko	(China) 1999 Tianjin	Women's all-around
Bronze	Olha Rozshchupkina	(China) 1999 Tianjin	Women's balance beam
Bronze	Oleksandr Beresch, Sergei Vyaltsev, Roman Zozulya, Andrei Lipsky, Ruslan Mezentsev, Andrei Mikhailichenko	(Belgium) 2001 Ghent	Men's team
Bronze	Oleksandr Beresch	(Belgium) 2001 Ghent	Men's pommel horse
Silver	Oleksandr Beresch	(Belgium) 2001 Ghent	Men's horizontal bar
Bronze	Irina Yarotska	(Hungary) 2002 Debrecen	Women's balance beam
Bronze	Valeriy Honcharov	(Australia) 2005 Melbourne	Men's horizontal bar
Gold	Iryna Krasnianska	(Denmark) 2006 Aarhus	Women's balance beam
Bronze	Oleksandr Vorobiov	(United Kingdom) 2009 London	Men's rings
Silver	Igor Radivilov	(China) 2014 Nanning	Men's vault
Gold	Oleg Verniaiev	(China) 2014 Nanning	Men's parallel bars
Silver	Oleg Verniaiev	(United Kingdom) 2015 Glasgow	Men's parallel bars
Silver	Igor Radivilov	(Canada) 2017 Montreal	Men's vault
Silver	Oleg Verniaiev	(Canada) 2017 Montreal	Men's parallel bars
Silver	Oleg Verniaiev	(Qatar) 2018 Doha	Men's parallel bars
Bronze	Oleg Verniaiev	(Germany) 2019 Stuttgart	Men's all-around
Bronze	Igor Radivilov	(Germany) 2019 Stuttgart	Men's vault
Bronze	Illia Kovtun	(Japan) 2021 Kitakyushu	Men's all-around
Bronze	Igor Radivilov	(United Kingdom) 2022 Liverpool	Men's vault
Silver	Illia Kovtun	(Belgium) 2023 Antwerp	Men's all-around
Bronze	Nazar Chepurnyi	(Belgium) 2023 Antwerp	Men's vault
Bronze	Nazar Chepurnyi	(Indonesia) 2025 Jakarta	Men's vault

== Medal tables ==
=== By gender ===
Gender	Gold	Silver	Bronze	Total
Men	4	9	15	28
Women	3	4	5	12

=== By event ===
Event	Gold	Silver	Bronze	Total
Men's parallel bars	2	5	0	7
Men's vault	1	2	4	7
Women's balance beam	1	2	2	5
Women's individual all-around	1	1	1	3
Men's floor exercise	1	0	2	3
Women's vault	1	0	0	1
Men's horizontal bar	0	1	2	3
Men's individual all-around	0	1	2	3
Women's uneven bars	0	1	0	1
Men's pommel horse	0	0	2	2
Men's team	0	0	2	2
Men's rings	0	0	1	1
Women's floor exercise	0	0	1	1
Women's team	0	0	1	1

== Junior World medalists ==
Medal	Name	Year	Event
Silver	Nazar Chepurnyi, Volodymyr Kostiuk, Illia Kovtun, Dmytro Shyshko	(Hungary) 2019 Győr	Boys' team
Bronze	Illia Kovtun	(Hungary) 2019 Győr	Boys' all-around
Bronze	Nazar Chepurnyi	(Hungary) 2019 Győr	Boys' floor exercise
Gold	Nazar Chepurnyi	(Hungary) 2019 Győr	Boys' horizontal bar

== See also ==
- Ukraine men's national artistic gymnastics team
- Ukraine women's national artistic gymnastics team
- List of Olympic male artistic gymnasts for Ukraine
- List of Olympic female artistic gymnasts for Ukraine
