= Ukraine men's national artistic gymnastics team =

Ukraine men's national gymnastics team
- Continental union: European Union of Gymnastics
- National federation: Ukrainian Gymnastics Federation

Olympic Games
- Appearances: 7
- Medals: Silver: 2000; Bronze: 1996

World Championships
- Medals: Bronze: 1994, 2001

Junior World Championships
- Appearances: 3
- Medals: Silver: 2019

European Championships
- Medals: Gold: 2020, 2024; Silver: 1996; Bronze: 2000, 2014

The Ukraine men's national artistic gymnastics team represents Ukraine in FIG international competitions.

== History ==
Ukraine has made seven appearances in the men's team competition at the Olympic Games and has won two medals. They debuted at the 1996 Olympic Games after the fall of the Soviet Union.

== Senior roster ==
Name	Birthdate and age	Hometown
Oleg Verniaiev	29 September 1993 (age 33)	Donetsk
Vladyslav Hryko	25 January 1997 (age 29)	Kharkiv
Ihor Dyshuk	7 May 2005 (age 21)	Dnipropetrovsk
Mykyta Melnykov	15 August 2003 (age 23)	Kyiv
Yehor Perepolkin	25 February 2004 (age 22)	Sumy
Dmytro Prudko	21 January 2005 (age 21)	Dnipropetrovsk
Ivan Rudyi	5 July 2006 (age 20)	Dnipropetrovsk
Bohdan Suprun	30 July 2004 (age 22)	Donetsk
Nazar Chepurnyi	3 September 2002 (age 24)	Cherkasy
Sviatoslav Shved	7 March 2006 (age 20)	Kyiv
Rodion Shkuratskyi	17 July 2005 (age 21)	Dnipropetrovsk

== Junior roster ==
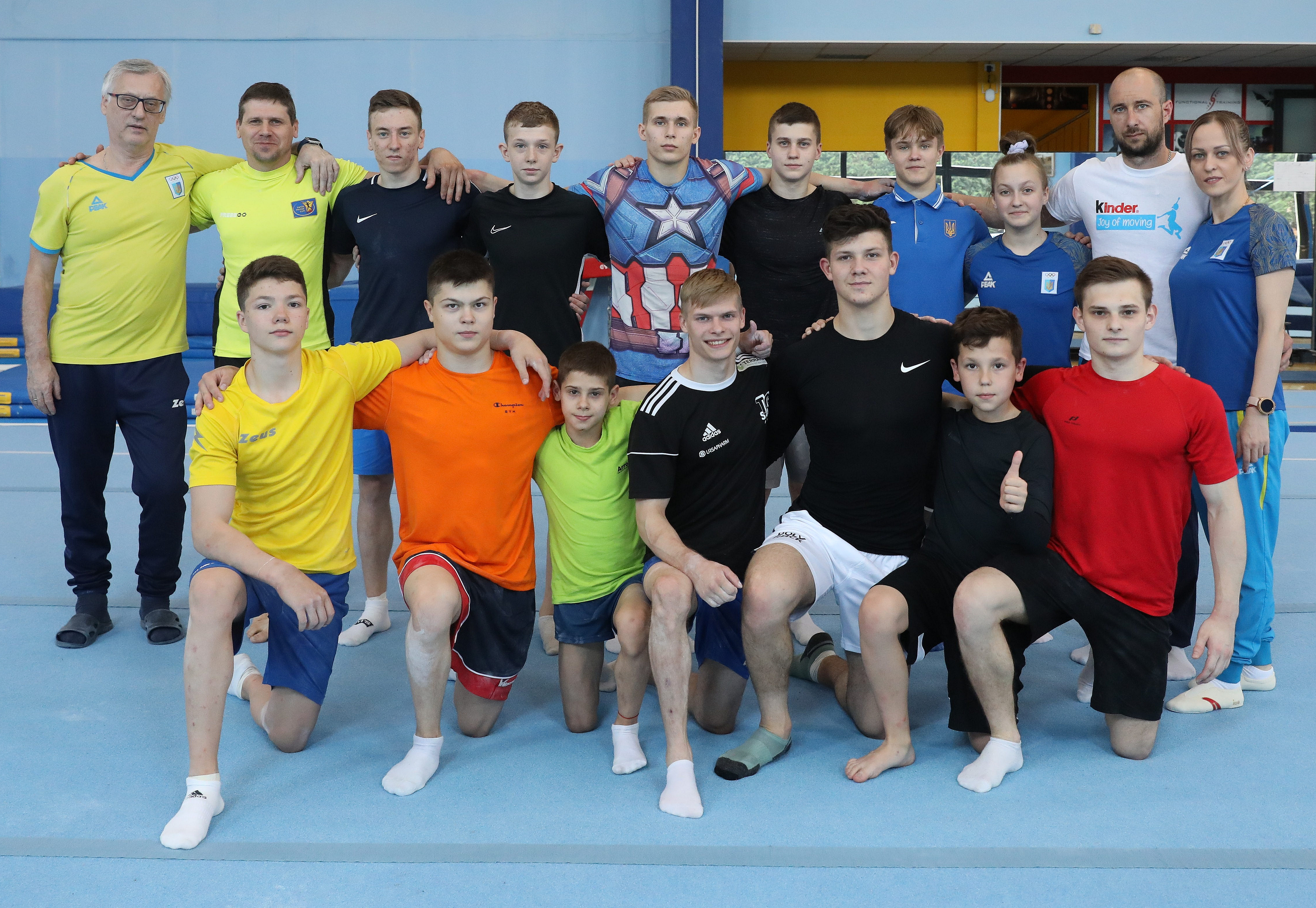
Members of the junior national artistic gymnastics team alongside Illia Kovtun and coaches in the Italian exile in Ferrara shortly after the Russian invasion of Ukraine

Name	Birthdate and age	Hometown
Matvey Bondarenko	14 November 2007 (age 19)	Dnipropetrovsk
Stasis Butrimas	19 July 2004 (age 22)	Kyiv
Timur Vasilenko	15 December 2009 (age 16)	Dnipropetrovsk
Vladyslav Vlasenko	15 February 2008 (age 18)	Kyiv
Valentyn Havrylchenko	28 July 2008 (age 18)	Kyiv
Volodymyr Golovin	23 November 2010 (age 15)	Zaporizhzhia
Vitaliy Hontkivskiy	4 March 2000 (age 26)	Khmelnytskyi
Vladislav Hontkivskiy	4 March 2000 (age 26)	Khmelnytskyi
Ivan Zavada	18 December 2007 (age 18)	Kyiv
Timofey Kirichenko	22 October 2008 (age 18)	Odesa
Bohdan Kostiuk	7 February 2012 (age 14)	Kirovohrad

== Team competition results ==
=== Olympic Games ===
- 1928 through 1992 — participated as the Soviet Union
- 1996 — bronze medal
  Ihor Korobchynskyi, Oleg Kosiak, Grigory Misutin, Vladimir Shamenko, Rustam Sharipov, Olexander Svitlichni, Yuri Yermakov
- 2000 — silver medal
  Oleksandr Beresh, Valeri Goncharov, Ruslan Myezyentsev, Valeri Pereshkura, Olexander Svitlichni, Roman Zozulya
- 2004 — 7th place
  Evgeni Bogonosyuk, Valeri Goncharov, Vadym Kuvakin, Ruslan Myezyentsev, Andrei Mykaylichenko, Roman Zozulya
- 2008 — did not qualify a full team
- 2012 — 4th place
  Nikolai Kuksenkov, Vitaliy Nakonechnyi, Igor Radivilov, Oleg Stepko, Oleg Verniaiev
- 2016 — 8th place
  Vladyslav Hryko, Igor Radivilov, Maksym Semiankiv, Andriy Sienichkin, Oleg Verniaiev
- 2020 — 7th place
  Illia Kovtun, Petro Pakhniuk, Igor Radivilov, Yevhen Yudenkov
- 2024 — 5th place
  Nazar Chepurnyi, Illia Kovtun, Igor Radivilov, Radomyr Stelmakh, Oleg Verniaiev

=== World Championships ===
- 1934 through 1991 — participated as the Soviet Union
- 1994 — bronze medal
  Rustam Charipov, Yuri Ermakov, Igor Korobchinski, Vitaly Marinich, Grigori Misutin, Vladimir Shamenko, Andrei Stepanchenko
- 1995 — 5th place
  Rustam Sharipov, Vladimir Chamenko, Alexander Svetlichnyi, Yuri Ermakov, Igor Korobchinski, Grigory Misutin, Oleg Kosiak
- 1997 —
- 1999 —
- 2001 — bronze medal
  Alexander Beresh, Sergei Vyaltsev, Roman Zozulya, Andrei Lipsky, Ruslan Mezentsev, Andrei Mikhailichenko
- 2003 — 8th place
  Ruslan Mezentsev, Roman Zozulya, Alexander Svetlichnyi, Alexander Beresch, Valery Goncharov, Sergei Vyaltsev
- 2006 —
- 2007 —
- 2010 — 13th (qualifications)
- 2011 — 5th place
  Mykola Kuksenkov, Vitaly Nakonechny, Oleg Stepko, Igor Radivilov, Roman Zozulya, Oleg Verniaiev
- 2014 — 9th (qualifications)
  Georgii Petrosian, Igor Radivilov, Maksym Semiankiv, Andrii Sienichkin, Oleg Verniaiev, Mykyta Yermak
- 2015 – 12th (qualifications)
  Vladyslav Hryko, Volodymyr Okachev, Igor Radivilov, Maksym Semiankiv, Oleg Verniaiev, Mykyta Yermak
- 2018 — 9th (qualifications)
  Vladyslav Hryko, Petro Pakhniuk, Igor Radivilov, Maksym Vasylenko, Oleg Verniaiev
- 2019 — 8th place
  Vladyslav Hryko, Petro Pakhniuk, Igor Radivilov, Oleg Verniaiev, Yevgen Yudenkov
- 2022 — 21st place (qualifications)
  Pantely Kolodii, Illia Kovtun, Mykyta Melnykov, Igor Radivilov, Bogdan Suprun
- 2023 — 12th place (qualifications)
  Nazar Chepurnyi, Illia Kovtun, Igor Radivilov, Radomyr Stelmakh, Oleg Verniaiev, Pantely Kolodii

=== Junior World Championships ===
- 2019 — silver medal
  Nazar Chepurnyi, Volodymyr Kostiuk, Illia Kovtun, Dmytro Shyshko
- 2023 – 24th place
  Ivan Rudyi, Rodion Shkuratskyi, Yuri Yemelianov
- 2025 – 19th place
  Volodymyr Golovin, Valentyn Havrylchenko, Tymofii Kyrychenko

== Most decorated gymnasts ==
This list includes all Ukrainian male artistic gymnasts who have won at least three medals at the Olympic Games and the World Artistic Gymnastics Championships combined or at least one individual medal. Not included are medals won as part of the Soviet Union or Unified Teams.

Rank	Gymnast	Years	Team	AA	FX	PH	SR	VT	PB	HB	Olympic Total	World Total	Total
1	Oleg Verniaiev	2014–2019		2016; 2019					2016; 2014; 2015; 2017; 2018		2	5	7
2	Oleksandr Beresch	1997–2001	2000; 2001	2000		2001				2001; 1997	2	4	6
3	Rustam Sharipov	1994–1996	1996; 1994						1996; 1996; 1994		2	3	5
4	Hrihoriy Misyutin	1993–1996	1996		1993; 1995; 1996			1995			1	4	5
5	Igor Radivilov	2012–2022						2012; 2014; 2017; 2019; 2022			1	4	5
6	Valeriy Honcharov	2000–2005	2000						2004	2005	2	1	3
7	Illia Kovtun	2021–2024		2023; 2021					2024		1	2	3
8	Ihor Korobchynskyi	1993–1996	1996; 1994						1993		1	2	3
9	Oleksandr Vorobiov	2008–2009					2008; 2009				1	1	2
9	Nazar Chepurnyi	2023						2023; 2025			0	2	2
10	Vitaly Marinich	1994				1994					0	1	1

== Gallery ==
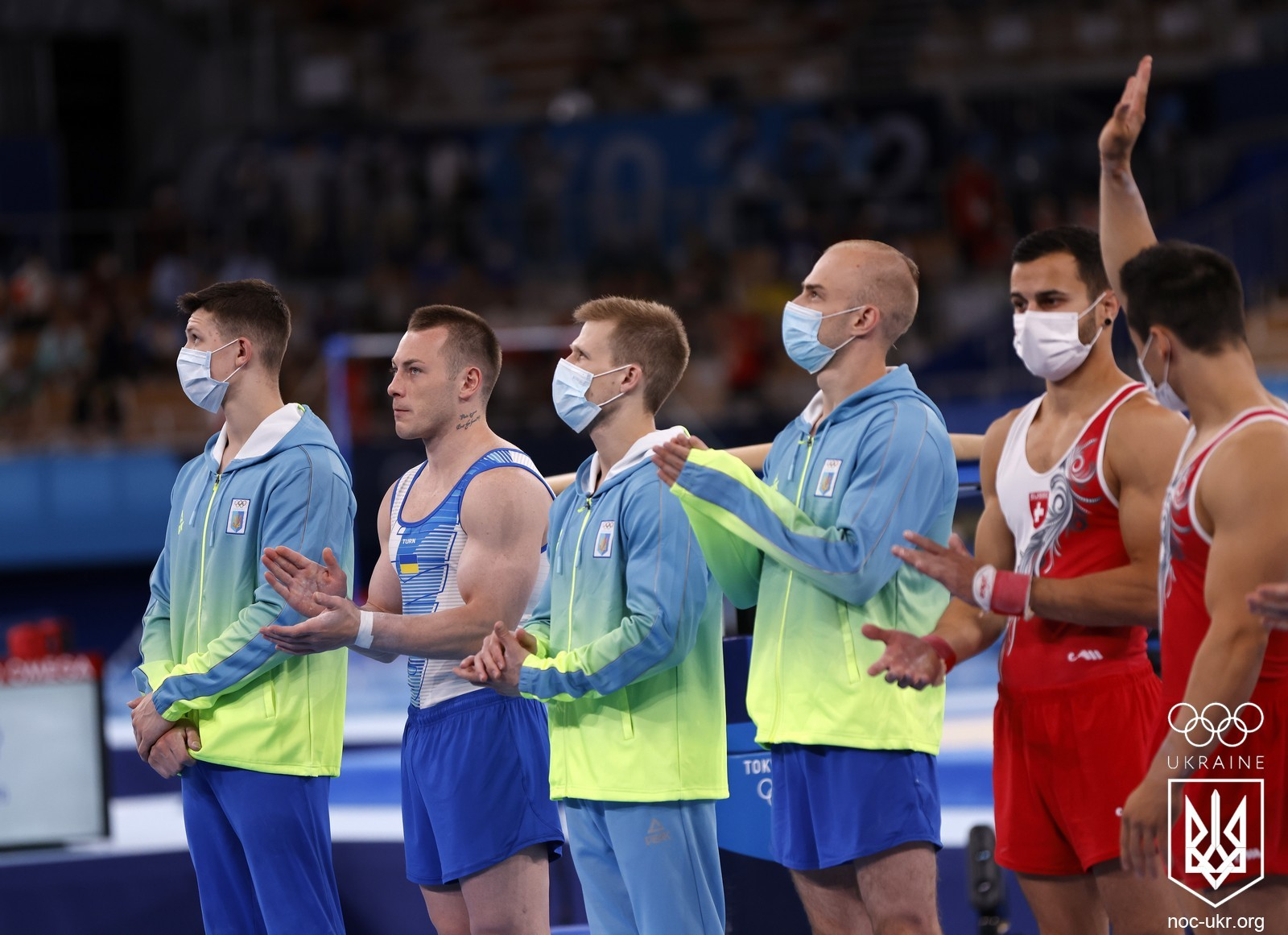
Ukraine at the 2020 Olympic Games

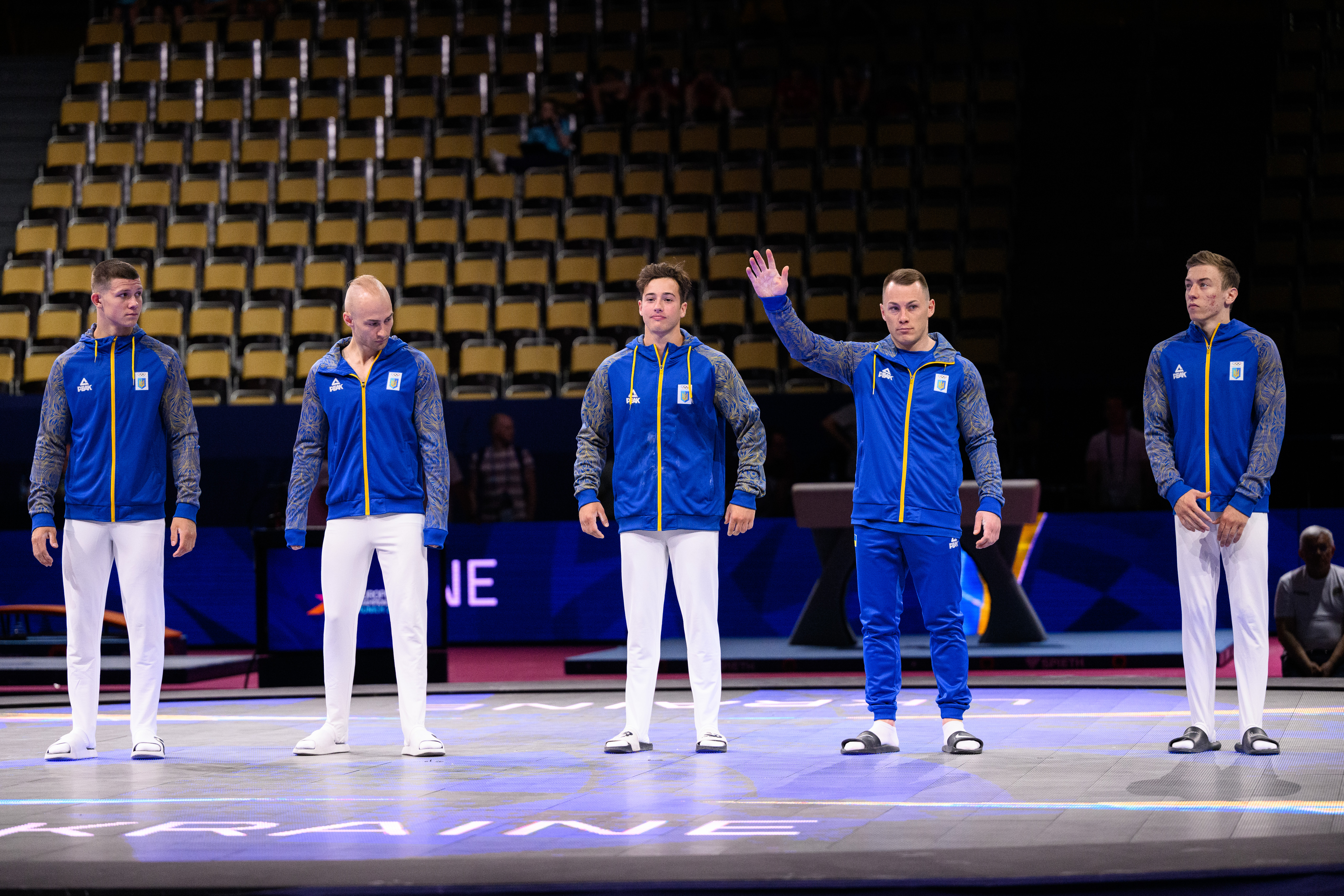
Ukraine at the 2022 European Championships

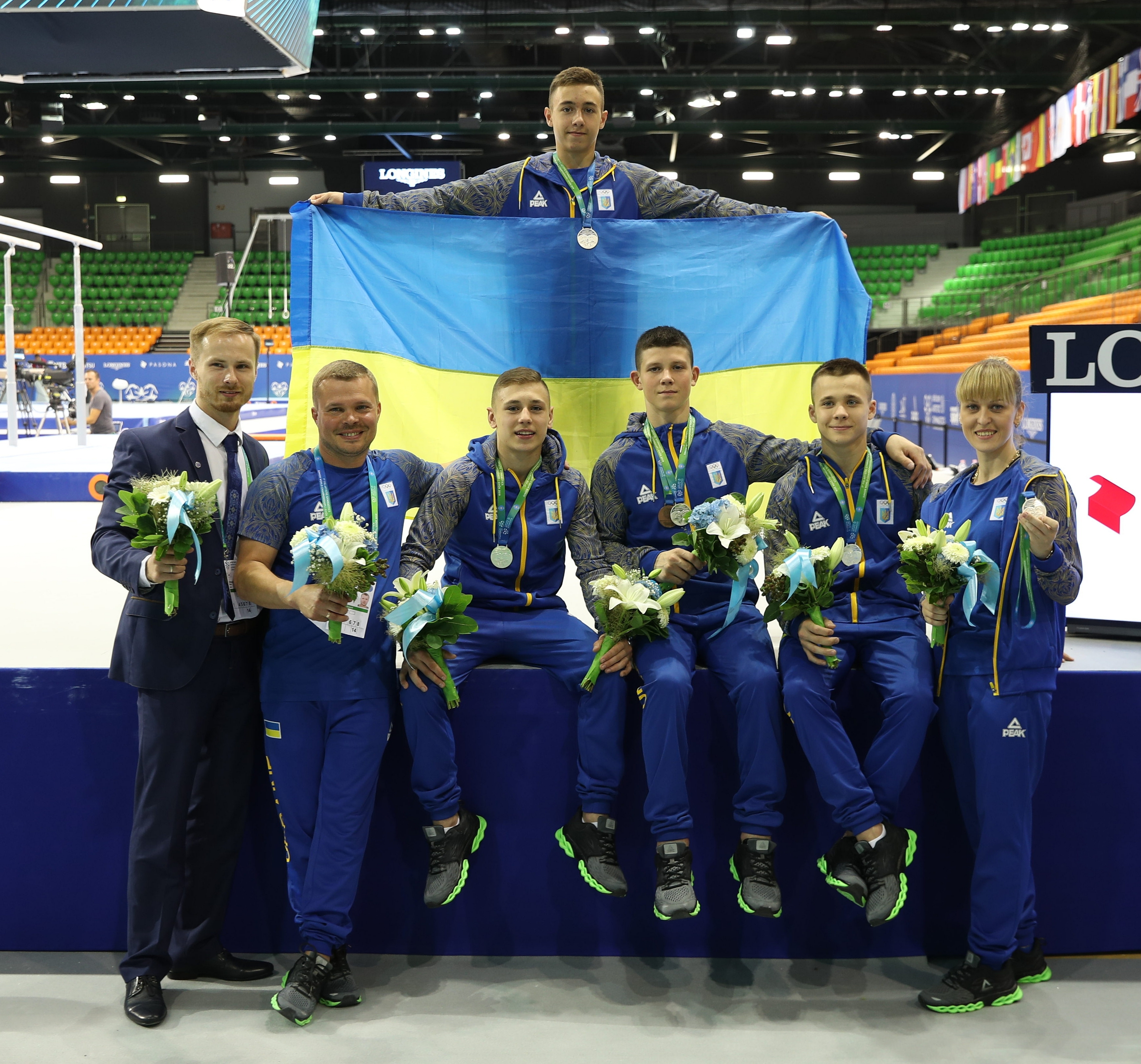
Ukraine at the 2019 Junior World Championships

== See also ==
- Ukraine women's national gymnastics team
- List of Olympic male artistic gymnasts for Ukraine
