= Oleg Kosyak =

Ukrainian gymnast and sports coach (born 1975)

Oleg Kosyak (Oleg Kosiak, Oleh Kosiak)
- Full name: Oleh Yuriiovych Kosiak (Oleg Yuriyovych Kosyak)
- Born: 26 November 1975 (age 50) Kyiv, Ukraine

Gymnastics career
- Discipline: Men's artistic gymnastics
- Country represented: Ukraine
- Club: Dynamo, California Golden Bears
- Head coaches: Yuli Kuksenkov, V. Zhovnovatyi
Medal record
Olympic Games
Bronze medal – third place	1996 Atlanta	Team
European Championships
Silver medal – second place	1996 Copenhagen	Team

Oleg Yuriiovych Kosyak (Ukrainian: Косяк Олег Юрійович; born 26 November 1975 in Kyiv, Ukraine) is a Ukrainian gymnast and sports coach. Merited Master of Sports of Ukraine (1996).

== Career ==
In 1997 he graduated from National University of Physical Education and Sport of Ukraine. Was representing Dynamo Sports Club (Kyiv) in athletic competitions. His coaches are Yuli Kuksenkov, V. Zhovnovatyi. Was training in California Golden Bears teams representing University of California, Berkeley.

At the 1996 Summer Olympics in Atlanta, together with Rustam Sharipov, Olexander Svitlichni, Yuri Yermakov, Volodymyr Shamenko, Ihor Korobchynskyi and Hrihoriy Misyutin, Oleg Kosyak won bronze medal in the men's team all-around competition, one of eight events for male competitors in artistic gymnastics. Ukraine team followed Russia and China teams and less than 0.2 points passed ahead of Belarus team.

Besides the sports achievements Oleg Kosyak also received a degree in mathematics from University of California, Berkeley.

=== Coaching career ===
Students of Oleg Kosyak were awarded at regional and California state championships.
