= Gymnastics at the 1996 Summer Olympics – Men's artistic team all-around =

Men's artistic team all-around at the Games of the XXVI Olympiad

Medalists
1st place, gold medalist(s)		Sergei Kharkov, Nikolai Kryukov, Alexei Nemov, Yevgeni Podgorny, Dmitri Trush, Dmitri Vasilenko, and Alexei Voropaev	Russia
2nd place, silver medalist(s)		Fan Bin, Fan Hongbin, Huang Huadong, Huang Liping, Li Xiaoshuang, Shen Jian, and Zhang Jinjing	China
3rd place, bronze medalist(s)		Ihor Korobchynskyi, Oleg Kosiak, Grigory Misutin, Vladimir Shamenko, Rustam Sharipov, Olexander Svitlichni, Yuri Yermakov	Ukraine

These are the results of the men's team all-around competition, one of eight events for male competitors in artistic gymnastics at the 1996 Summer Olympics in Atlanta. The compulsory and optional rounds took place on July 20 and 22 at the Georgia Dome.

The 1996 Summer Olympics in Atlanta had begun a significant overhaul of artistic gymnastics in general, especially with regard to the format of competition on all events. One particularly major development was the total elimination of compulsories for all artistic gymnasts in all future competitions after these Olympics. Also, these would be the first and last Olympics to use the “7–6–5” format, which meant “SEVEN members where SIX would compete and the FIVE top scores would count towards team total” on each apparatus, for their team competitions, and for teams to consist of seven members. From the next Olympics onwards, teams would revert to competing with six members again.

== Qualification ==
The top 12 teams at the 1995 World Artistic Gymnastics Championships earned places in the team all-around competition.

== Results ==
Rank	Team/Gymnast	Floor			Pommel Horse			Rings			Vault			Parallel Bars			Horizontal Bar			Total	Ind. Rank
Rank	Team/Gymnast	C	O	Rank	C	O	Rank	C	O	Rank	C	O	Rank	C	O	Rank	C	O	Rank	Total	Ind. Rank
1st place, gold medalist(s)	Russia	96.784		1	95.286		3	95.537		2	96.749		1	96.173		2	96.249		1	576.778	
1st place, gold medalist(s)	Alexei Nemov	9.700	9.750	3	9.662	9.750	7	9.500	9.650	14	9.600	9.825	2	9.650	9.737	1	9.750	9.787	1	116.361	1
1st place, gold medalist(s)	Alexei Voropaev	9.587	9.662	12	9.325	9.500	39	9.525	9.725	9	9.750	9.700	1	9.475	9.525	24	9.612	9.750	6	115.136	3
1st place, gold medalist(s)	Yevgeni Podgorny	9.737	9.812	1	9.275	9.350	57	9.325	9.512	43	9.650	9.562	10	0.000	9.225	103	9.450	9.525	31	104.423	66
1st place, gold medalist(s)	Dmitri Vasilenko	9.662	9.687	7	9.375	9.512	33	9.400	9.575	29	9.562	9.700	10	9.350	9.600	27	—		—	95.423	78
1st place, gold medalist(s)	Sergei Kharkov	0.000	9.662	94	—		—	9.450	9.712	12	9.625	9.637	10	9.637	9.675	5	9.600	9.650	14	86.648	87
1st place, gold medalist(s)	Nikolai Kryukov	9.525	0.000	96	9.675	9.562	13	—		—	9.512	9.700	17	9.562	9.675	8	9.600	9.525	22	86.336	88
1st place, gold medalist(s)	Dmitri Trush	9.500	9.512	30	9.575	9.250	39	9.400	9.600	25	—		—	9.637	0.000	95	9.450	9.525	31	85.449	91
2nd place, silver medalist(s)	China	95.561		3	96.685		1	95.336		4	96.273		2	96.210		1	95.474		4	575.539	
2nd place, silver medalist(s)	Li Xiaoshuang	9.575	9.775	6	9.700	9.700	8	8.350	9.800	81	9.575	9.762	6	9.637	9.625	7	9.550	9.737	9	114.786	6
2nd place, silver medalist(s)	Zhang Jinjing	9.387	9.462	41	9.462	9.637	17	9.375	9.525	35	9.600	9.612	17	9.587	9.712	6	9.475	9.762	15	114.596	8
2nd place, silver medalist(s)	Shen Jian	9.575	9.200	44	9.737	9.450	15	9.500	9.662	12	9.587	9.662	15	9.475	9.725	9	9.350	9.300	54	114.223	13
2nd place, silver medalist(s)	Fan Bin	0.000	9.625	95	9.762	9.787	1	9.425	9.562	28	9.575	9.100	63	9.350	9.662	22	9.650	9.725	4	105.223	64
2nd place, silver medalist(s)	Huang Huadong	9.487	9.475	33	9.700	9.725	5	9.200	9.300	66	9.537	0.000	98	9.400	9.512	33	9.200	9.000	72	103.536	71
2nd place, silver medalist(s)	Huang Liping	9.400	0.000	99	9.400	9.475	34	—		—	9.625	9.625	12	9.650	9.737	1	9.550	9.375	39	85.837	90
2nd place, silver medalist(s)	Fan Hongbin	9.562	9.625	20	—		—	9.537	9.750	8	0.000	9.650	96	—		—	—		—	48.124	109
3rd place, bronze medalist(s)	Ukraine	95.149		5	94.974		6	95.223		5	95.973		4	95.299		3	94.923		7	571.541	
3rd place, bronze medalist(s)	Rustam Sharipov	9.450	9.425	38	9.450	9.562	23	9.487	9.637	16	9.687	9.587	9	9.575	9.625	9	9.350	9.537	44	114.372	10
3rd place, bronze medalist(s)	Olexander Svitlichni	9.575	9.650	14	9.650	9.300	29	9.537	9.687	10	9.637	9.425	37	9.400	9.525	29	9.425	9.075	64	113.886	17
3rd place, bronze medalist(s)	Vladimir Shamenko	9.325	9.437	46	9.350	9.425	48	9.425	9.575	25	9.587	9.300	49	9.550	9.475	20	9.500	9.537	27	113.486	21
3rd place, bronze medalist(s)	Ihor Korobchynskyi	9.325	9.350	54	9.712	9.750	63	9.275	9.475	49	9.750	9.600	5	9.500	9.637	15	9.487	9.612	26	113.473	22
3rd place, bronze medalist(s)	Oleg Kosiak	0.000	9.450	98	9.375	0.000	101	9.275	9.500	47	8.650	9.575	87	9.050	9.400	57	9.375	9.600	31	93.250	83
3rd place, bronze medalist(s)	Yuri Yermakov	9.475	0.000	97	9.725	9.150	34	9.400	0.000	99	—		—	9.500	9.512	22	9.475	9.375	46	75.612	100
3rd place, bronze medalist(s)	Grigory Misutin	9.625	9.737	5	0.000	9.625	99	0.000	9.700	98	9.425	9.700	30	—		—	—		—	57.812	106
4	Belarus	95.861		2	95.461		2	94.600		8	96.061		3	95.036		5	94.362		11	571.381	
4	Vitaly Scherbo	9.687	9.775	2	9.612	9.000	58	9.425	9.525	30	9.725	9.650	4	9.687	9.687	4	9.687	9.750	2	115.210	2
4	Andrei Kan	9.525	9.700	14	9.375	9.712	18	9.400	9.550	30	9.500	9.537	38	9.625	9.512	15	9.525	9.400	39	114.361	11
4	Vitaly Rudnitski	9.425	9.700	23	9.150	9.450	59	9.250	9.675	33	9.650	9.500	27	9.350	9.275	46	9.400	8.800	72	112.625	31
4	Aleksandr Belanovski	9.250	0.000	106	9.525	9.450	25	9.350	9.575	33	9.587	9.100	62	9.350	9.425	42	9.500	9.400	42	103.512	72
4	Aleksandr Shostak	0.000	9.375	101	9.425	9.662	18	9.250	9.500	49	9.650	9.475	30	9.375	9.475	35	—		—	85.187	92
4	Ivan Pavlovski	9.562	9.562	24	—		—	9.200	9.600	45	9.675	9.612	8	0.000	8.025	106	8.750	9.100	79	83.086	96
4	Aleksei Sinkevich	9.500	9.425	34	9.625	9.625	12	—		—	—		—	0.000	9.625	96	9.225	9.375	57	66.400	103
5	United States	94.837		6	94.449		7	95.461		3	95.336		6	95.037		4	95.498		3	570.618	
5	John Roethlisberger	9.587	9.725	10	9.700	9.100	45	9.600	9.600	11	9.562	9.575	29	9.575	9.575	13	9.500	9.787	9	114.886	5
5	Blaine Wilson	9.500	9.200	50	9.350	9.625	25	9.612	9.725	5	9.575	9.625	20	9.500	9.425	29	9.475	9.725	18	114.337	12
5	John Macready	9.475	9.450	34	9.350	9.375	50	9.325	9.487	44	9.425	9.150	76	9.450	8.850	73	9.500	9.537	27	112.374	33
5	Jair Lynch	9.500	9.725	14	9.475	9.587	22	9.250	9.300	64	9.587	9.575	25	9.650	9.725	3	9.200	0.000	104	104.574	65
5	Kip Simons	9.300	9.325	60	—		—	9.462	9.650	17	9.525	9.425	42	9.300	9.537	39	9.400	9.537	38	94.461	80
5	Chainey Umphrey	9.300	9.250	64	9.225	9.250	62	9.375	9.625	25	0.000	9.300	103	9.200	0.000	104	0.000	9.587	99	84.112	95
5	Mihal Bagiu	—		—	9.637	9.000	56	—		—	9.587	0.000	97	0.000	9.300	102	8.550	9.787	68	55.861	108
6	Bulgaria	94.361		10	94.349		8	94.760		7	95.549		5	93.725		10	94.823		9	567.567	
6	Yordan Yovchev	9.525	9.712	13	9.575	9.375	29	9.612	9.762	2	9.625	9.575	20	9.525	9.400	29	9.512	9.700	16	114.898	4
6	Krasimir Dounev	9.425	9.300	47	9.375	9.275	54	9.437	9.612	22	9.675	9.575	12	9.450	9.475	29	9.587	9.712	7	113.898	16
6	Dimitar Lunchev	9.250	9.300	64	9.375	9.487	42	9.075	9.250	74	9.550	9.400	42	9.375	9.000	64	9.475	9.675	21	112.162	37
6	Kalofer Hristozov	9.300	9.225	66	9.275	9.450	50	9.325	9.525	41	9.450	9.225	63	9.000	9.300	73	9.200	9.025	71	111.300	40
6	Deyan Tordanov	9.075	9.175	78	9.175	9.512	53	9.200	8.800	85	9.525	9.300	53	9.350	9.000	68	9.300	8.975	70	110.387	47
6	Ivan Ivanov	9.612	9.712	8	—		—	9.437	9.600	23	9.687	9.637	7	9.425	9.425	35	0.000	9.612	97	86.147	89
6	Vassil Vetzev	—		—	9.575	9.400	25	—		—	—		—	—		—	9.225	0.000	103	28.200	111
7	Germany	94.649		8	92.437		12	95.712		1	94.935		8	93.862		9	95.810		2	567.405	
7	Andreas Wecker	9.600	9.375	32	9.450	9.200	54	9.575	9.775	3	9.575	9.587	25	9.500	9.450	27	9.600	9.787	3	114.474	9
7	Valery Belenky	9.450	9.700	21	8.700	9.725	66	9.450	9.687	15	9.562	9.587	28	9.612	9.250	34	9.612	9.575	19	113.910	15
7	Jan-Peter Nikiferow	9.475	9.637	25	9.175	9.662	36	9.275	9.575	41	9.462	9.450	48	9.050	9.325	64	9.525	9.587	23	113.198	24
7	Oliver Walther	9.325	9.350	54	9.325	9.350	54	9.350	9.675	24	9.525	9.175	60	9.200	9.250	57	9.425	9.537	34	112.562	32
7	Karsten Oelsch	0.000	9.275	104	0.000	9.275	84	9.150	9.512	57	9.537	9.050	75	9.425	8.125	83	9.575	9.587	20	100.461	75
7	Uwe Billerbeck	9.462	9.200	57	—		—	—		—	9.537	9.400	46	9.375	9.475	35	9.425	9.525	36	75.399	101
7	Marius Toba	9.225	0.000	107	7.200	9.325	92	9.650	9.700	3	—		—	—		—	—		—	45.100	110
8	South Korea	95.511		4	92.848		11	94.049		9	94.949		7	94.524		7	95.173		5	567.054	
8	Lee Joo-Hyung	9.587	9.550	22	9.612	9.462	21	9.250	9.650	35	9.575	9.500	36	9.575	9.587	11	9.612	9.687	7	114.647	7
8	Han Yoon-Soo	9.425	9.400	42	9.675	9.662	10	8.975	9.425	71	9.350	9.325	63	9.475	9.525	24	9.637	9.625	12	113.499	19
8	Kim Dong-Hwa	9.425	9.000	71	8.350	8.550	85	9.225	9.712	32	9.250	9.000	86	9.400	0.000	98	9.400	9.125	62	100.437	76
8	Jung Jin-Soo	9.512	9.687	19	9.450	0.000	100	9.325	9.500	38	0.000	9.400	101	9.500	9.662	11	9.500	9.500	29	95.086	79
8	Yeo Hong-Chul	9.575	9.725	11	0.000	8.375	102	9.200	9.512	54	9.587	9.812	3	9.225	9.175	61	9.300	0.000	102	93.486	82
8	Cho Seong-Min	9.375	9.625	31	9.250	7.350	90	0.000	9.375	100	9.525	9.425	42	9.275	8.875	76	0.000	9.612	97	91.687	86
8	Kim Bong-Hyun	—		—	9.512	9.300	42	9.200	0.000	101	9.450	0.000	99	0.000	9.350	100	7.825	9.300	90	63.937	105
9	Romania	94.274		11	95.074		4	93.925		10	94.523		11	93.587		11	94.874		8	566.257	
9	Adrian Ianculescu	9.537	9.687	18	9.575	9.725	11	9.175	9.050	80	9.550	9.537	35	9.350	9.200	53	9.350	9.400	50	113.136	26
9	Nicu Stroia	9.450	9.425	38	9.425	9.500	32	9.125	9.625	49	9.512	9.200	59	9.175	9.225	61	9.550	9.662	16	112.874	28
9	Cristian Leric	9.275	9.525	43	9.125	9.600	50	8.950	8.950	86	9.562	9.612	23	9.125	9.537	44	9.250	9.675	39	112.186	35
9	Nistor Sandro	9.425	9.275	50	9.425	8.475	80	9.375	9.700	20	9.350	9.300	72	9.350	8.575	79	9.175	9.637	49	111.062	42
9	Robert Taciulet	9.250	8.675	84	8.800	9.150	78	9.150	9.425	60	9.275	9.525	55	0.000	9.325	101	—		—	82.575	98
9	Marius Urzică	0.000	9.275	104	9.712	9.837	2	—		—	9.375	0.000	102	9.500	9.550	17	9.475	9.375	46	76.099	99
9	Dan Burincă	9.400	0.000	104	—		—	9.475	9.825	7	0.000	9.200	104	9.375	0.000	99	9.500	9.025	62	65.800	104
10	Japan	94.737		7	94.211		9	93.674		11	94.886		9	94.687		6	93.824		12	566.019	
10	Naoya Tsukahara	9.600	9.625	14	9.425	9.537	28	9.225	9.537	48	9.637	9.537	23	9.450	9.587	19	9.450	9.537	30	114.147	14
10	Hikaru Tanaka	9.425	9.425	40	9.575	9.412	24	9.025	9.625	58	9.525	9.475	40	9.400	9.650	17	9.587	9.525	23	113.649	18
10	Yoshiaki Hatakeda	9.537	9.375	36	9.700	9.662	9	8.875	9.425	76	9.475	9.350	53	9.500	9.650	13	9.500	9.125	55	113.174	25
10	Toshiharu Sato	9.500	9.175	54	9.625	9.325	29	9.275	9.350	59	9.537	9.575	32	9.300	9.550	35	9.400	9.175	60	112.787	29
10	Shigeru Kurihara	9.475	9.425	37	9.175	8.550	81	9.425	9.687	17	9.525	9.250	58	9.150	9.250	61	8.400	9.200	82	110.512	44
10	Takashi Uchiyama	9.450	9.325	44	8.800	8.775	83	9.050	9.400	69	9.450	8.725	90	8.875	9.450	72	9.325	8.975	69	109.600	54
11	France	94.436		9	94.999		5	93.512		12	93.799		12	94.062		8	94.973		6	565.781	
11	Patrice Casimir	9.275	9.300	63	9.625	9.800	5	9.350	9.550	35	9.562	9.375	46	9.575	9.050	46	9.537	9.425	34	113.424	23
11	Sebastien Tayac	9.500	9.587	27	9.275	9.562	36	9.325	9.350	56	9.425	9.375	55	9.175	9.400	50	9.400	9.712	23	113.086	27
11	Frederick Nicolas	9.075	9.325	72	9.150	9.350	61	9.200	9.375	60	9.400	9.175	76	9.175	9.375	53	9.400	9.500	42	111.500	39
11	Frederic Lemoine	9.475	9.175	58	9.300	9.125	66	9.250	9.537	46	0.000	9.200	104	8.500	0.000	105	9.400	9.325	51	92.287	85
11	Eric Poujade	0.000	9.350	102	9.700	9.737	4	—		—	9.587	9.250	51	9.400	9.400	40	9.512	8.900	66	84.836	93
11	Sebastien Darrigade	9.300	0.000	103	8.800	9.500	69	9.275	9.300	60	9.450	0.000	99	9.500	9.525	20	9.512	0.000	100	84.162	94
11	Thierry Aymes	9.587	9.787	9	—		—	9.150	9.125	78	9.400	9.175	76	0.000	9.537	97	0.000	9.650	96	75.361	102
12	Italy	93.399		12	93.199		10	95.035		6	94.774		12	93.099		8	94.636		6	564.142	
12	Boris Preti	9.400	9.200	62	9.000	9.200	71	9.350	9.512	39	9.600	9.275	50	9.425	9.537	26	9.587	9.675	12	112.761	30
12	Roberto Galli	9.487	9.612	26	9.075	8.925	76	9.250	9.612	39	9.550	9.400	42	9.400	9.200	49	9.350	9.475	48	112.336	34
12	Jury Chechi	9.275	9.450	47	9.300	9.525	39	9.675	9.837	1	9.600	9.600	20	7.800	9.637	87	9.512	8.975	65	112.186	35
12	Paolo Bucci	9.250	8.750	82	3.000	9.150	98	9.512	9.575	19	9.512	9.512	39	9.300	9.350	45	0.000	9.487	101	96.398	77
12	Sergio Luini	9.250	9.225	68	9.325	9.512	36	—		—	9.450	9.250	60	9.175	9.400	50	9.400	9.500	36	93.537	81
12	Marcello Barbieri	9.200	9.250	70	—		—	9.175	9.537	54	9.475	9.125	74	8.650	9.225	80	9.150	0.000	105	82.787	97
12	Francesco Colombo	—		—	9.475	9.637	16	9.175	9.400	60	—		—	—		—	9.225	9.375	57	56.287	107
N/A	Zoltán Supola (HUN)	9.375	9.275	58	9.450	9.625	20	9.275	9.225	66	9.687	9.562	15	9.475	9.275	43	9.587	9.687	11	113.498	20
N/A	Jesus Carballo (ESP)	9.075	8.675	86	9.175	9.275	64	9.225	9.500	52	9.462	9.200	69	9.250	9.550	40	9.612	9.762	5	111.761	38
N/A	Ilia Giorgadze (GEO)	9.512	9.550	28	9.487	9.325	42	9.325	9.200	65	9.075	9.400	81	9.150	9.300	57	8.475	9.400	78	111.199	41
N/A	Alexei Dimitrienko (KAZ)	9.225	9.250	68	9.200	9.000	71	9.175	9.125	76	9.125	9.100	87	9.450	9.125	50	9.450	9.425	45	110.650	43
N/A	Brennon Dowrick (AUS)	9.200	8.750	83	9.350	9.450	45	9.300	9.150	69	9.350	8.800	92	9.325	9.150	56	9.350	9.325	53	110.500	45
N/A	Sergei Fedorchenko (KAZ)	9.475	9.575	29	9.475	8.975	64	9.150	9.200	73	9.675	9.575	12	9.300	9.050	68	7.675	9.350	92	110.475	46
N/A	Li Donghua (SUI)	9.275	9.025	76	9.675	9.812	3	8.525	8.750	92	9.475	8.950	83	9.400	8.950	68	9.225	9.150	67	110.212	48
N/A	Szilveszter Csollány (HUN)	9.275	9.000	77	9.350	9.175	60	9.600	9.712	6	9.525	9.150	63	9.150	8.850	78	9.175	8.250	85	110.212	48
N/A	Norayr Sargsyan (ARM)	9.175	9.537	49	9.175	8.825	76	9.100	9.300	71	9.487	9.612	34	8.975	8.475	86	9.300	9.250	61	110.211	50
N/A	Bret Hudson (AUS)	8.900	9.412	75	9.175	8.975	73	9.075	9.200	78	9.525	9.275	55	9.225	9.275	55	8.900	9.225	75	110.162	51
N/A	Ioannis Melissanidis (GRE)	9.575	9.800	4	8.800	8.900	82	9.175	8.725	86	9.550	9.550	33	9.050	9.200	75	8.825	8.825	81	109.975	52
N/A	Michael Engeler (SUI)	8.500	9.000	88	9.000	9.125	74	9.225	8.925	81	9.537	9.125	69	9.375	9.250	46	9.225	9.400	55	109.687	53
N/A	Lee McDermott (GBR)	9.350	9.050	72	7.450	9.175	89	9.300	9.425	52	9.325	9.250	76	9.350	9.025	64	9.275	9.325	57	109.300	55
N/A	Alan Nolet (CAN)	9.250	9.150	72	9.025	8.925	78	8.900	9.250	81	9.350	9.225	76	9.350	8.525	80	9.350	8.800	74	109.100	56
N/A	Aleksej Demjanov (CRO)	9.375	9.325	50	7.500	9.050	91	9.450	9.625	20	9.425	9.250	63	8.975	9.462	60	7.975	9.350	87	108.762	57
N/A	Jiri Firt (CZE)	8.875	8.825	87	9.300	8.925	70	9.325	9.150	68	9.425	9.250	63	8.450	9.100	83	8.425	9.462	77	108.512	58
N/A	Dominic Brindle (GBR)	9.225	8.575	85	7.550	9.200	88	9.025	9.025	84	9.375	9.075	82	9.275	8.825	77	9.275	9.450	51	107.875	59
N/A	Erich Wanner (SUI)	9.150	9.462	61	7.350	8.575	94	9.075	9.250	74	9.512	9.150	69	9.275	8.075	89	9.050	8.525	83	106.449	60
N/A	Flemming Solberg (NOR)	8.375	8.675	92	9.025	9.375	68	8.300	9.000	91	9.250	9.025	85	9.025	8.350	88	8.075	9.425	84	105.900	61
N/A	Krisztian Jordanov (HUN)	9.250	9.450	50	6.875	8.975	95	8.575	8.250	93	9.662	8.675	84	8.950	9.400	68	8.550	9.175	80	105.787	62
N/A	Richard Ikeda (CAN)	9.325	8.675	80	9.475	9.325	45	7.175	9.075	96	9.275	8.900	90	9.300	7.775	91	9.575	7.475	91	105.400	63
N/A	Diego Lizardi (PUR)	9.025	9.475	67	8.350	8.125	93	8.250	9.325	88	9.562	9.275	51	8.350	7.500	93	8.675	8.500	89	104.412	67
N/A	Runar Alexandersson (ISL)	8.900	9.300	79	8.500	9.537	75	8.825	8.750	88	9.275	8.925	89	7.800	8.300	92	7.025	9.200	95	104.337	68
N/A	Kristan Burley (CAN)	9.250	8.775	81	7.275	8.325	96	8.450	7.575	97	9.525	9.475	40	9.200	9.175	64	9.300	7.975	88	104.300	69
N/A	Marcelo Palacio (ARG)	9.025	8.425	89	8.625	8.250	86	8.400	8.925	90	8.825	9.050	94	8.775	8.325	90	8.750	8.650	86	104.025	70
N/A	Shane de Freitas (BAR)	8.600	8.675	90	7.325	7.950	97	8.150	8.500	94	9.375	9.275	72	8.800	8.725	85	9.100	8.900	76	103.375	73
N/A	Barry McDonald (IRL)	9.000	8.200	91	8.475	8.300	87	8.225	8.150	95	9.250	8.600	95	8.725	8.950	82	8.200	8.775	93	102.850	74
N/A	Pae Gil Su (PRK)	9.025	7.725	93	9.462	9.775	13	8.125	0.000	102	9.100	8.900	93	5.450	8.875	94	7.675	8.625	94	92.737	84
