= Krisztián Jordanov =

Hungarian gymnast

- Born: 15 April 1976 (age 50) Sofia, Bulgaria
- Height: 1.70
- Relatives: Dimitar Yordanov (grandfather)

Gymnastics career
- Discipline: Men's artistic gymnastics
- Country represented: Hungary
- Club: Budapesti Honvéd Sportegyesület

Krisztián Jordanov (born 15 April 1976) is a Hungarian gymnast. He competed at the 1996 Summer Olympics.
