= Illia Kovtun =

Ukrainian and Croatian artistic gymnast (born 2003)

- Ілля Ковтун
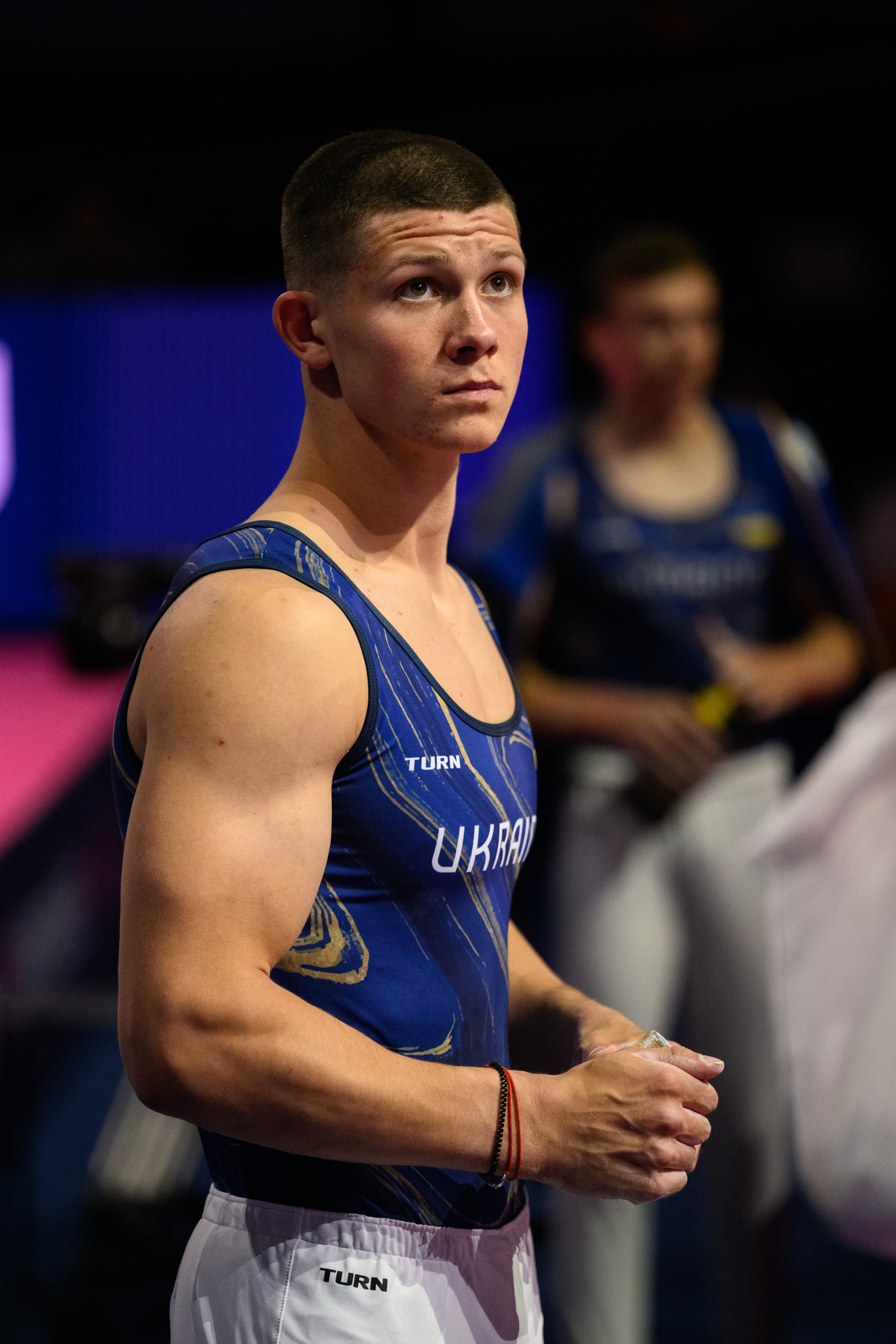
- Kovtun at the 2022 European Championships

Personal information
- Alternative name: Ilija Kovtun
- Born: Illia Yuriiovych Kovtun; 10 August 2003 (age 23) Cherkasy, Ukraine
- Height: 1.80 m (5 ft 11 in)

Gymnastics career
- Discipline: Men's artistic gymnastics
- Country represented: Croatia; (2025–present)
- Former countries represented: Ukraine (2017–2024)
- Training location: Osijek, Croatia
- Club: Sokol Osijek
- Head coach: Iryna Gorbacheva
- Eponymous skills: "Kovtun" (Parallel Bars) Back toss from upper arm with quarter turn to one rail (C)
Medal record
Representing Croatia
World Championships
Silver medal – second place	2026 Rotterdam	Parallel Bars
European Championships
Gold medal – first place	2026 Zagreb	All-Around
Gold medal – first place	2026 Zagreb	Parallel Bars
Representing Ukraine
Olympic Games
Silver medal – second place	2024 Paris	Parallel Bars
World Championships
Silver medal – second place	2023 Antwerp	All-Around
Bronze medal – third place	2021 Kitakyushu	All-Around
European Championships
Gold medal – first place	2023 Antalya	Parallel Bars
Gold medal – first place	2024 Rimini	Team
Gold medal – first place	2024 Rimini	Parallel Bars
Gold medal – first place	2024 Rimini	Horizontal Bar
Silver medal – second place	2022 Munich	Parallel Bars
Bronze medal – third place	2021 Basel	All-Around
Bronze medal – third place	2023 Antalya	All-Around
Bronze medal – third place	2023 Antalya	Horizontal Bar
Junior World Championships
Silver medal – second place	2019 Győr	Team
Bronze medal – third place	2019 Győr	All-Around
FIG World Cup
Event	1st	2nd	3rd
World Cup	12	4	3
World Challenge Cup	13	5	4
Total	25	9	7

Illia Yuriiovych Kovtun (Ukrainian: Ілля Юрійович Ковтун; Croatian: Ilija Kovtun; born 10 August 2003) is a Ukrainian and Croatian artistic gymnast. He currently represents Croatia in international competitions and previously represented Ukraine until 2025.

Kovtun is the 2024 Olympic silver medalist on parallel bars. He is the 2023 World all-around silver medalist, 2021 World all-around bronze medalist, and is a two-time junior world championships medalist.

At the European Championships, he is the 2026 all-around champion, a three-time champion on parallel bars (2023, 2024, 2026), and a one-time champion on horizontal bar (2024). Additionally, he was part of the gold medal-winning team in 2024.

== Early life ==
Kovtun was born in Cherkasy on 10 August 2003. His parents enrolled him in gymnastics classes at the age of three, which he attended with his older sister. He speaks Ukrainian, Russian, and Croatian.

== Gymnastics career ==
=== 2018 ===
Kovtun competed at the 2018 European Championships where he helped Ukraine finish fifth in the team finals. Individually, he won the junior title on the parallel bars.

=== 2019 ===
Kovtun competed at the Stella Zakharova Cup where he placed first in the junior all-around division. He was selected to represent Ukraine at the inaugural junior World Championships alongside Nazar Chepurnyi and Volodymyr Kostiuk. Together they finished second as a team behind Japan. Individually, he won the bronze medal in the all-around behind Shinnosuke Oka and Ryosuke Doi. During the event finals, Kovtun finished sixth on pommel horse and fourth on parallel bars.

Kovtun next competed at the European Youth Olympic Festival in Baku, Azerbaijan, again alongside Chepurnyi and Kostiuk. They won gold as a team, and individually Kovtun won gold in the all-around and on parallel bars and horizontal bar; additionally, he won silver on floor exercise behind Chepurnyi.

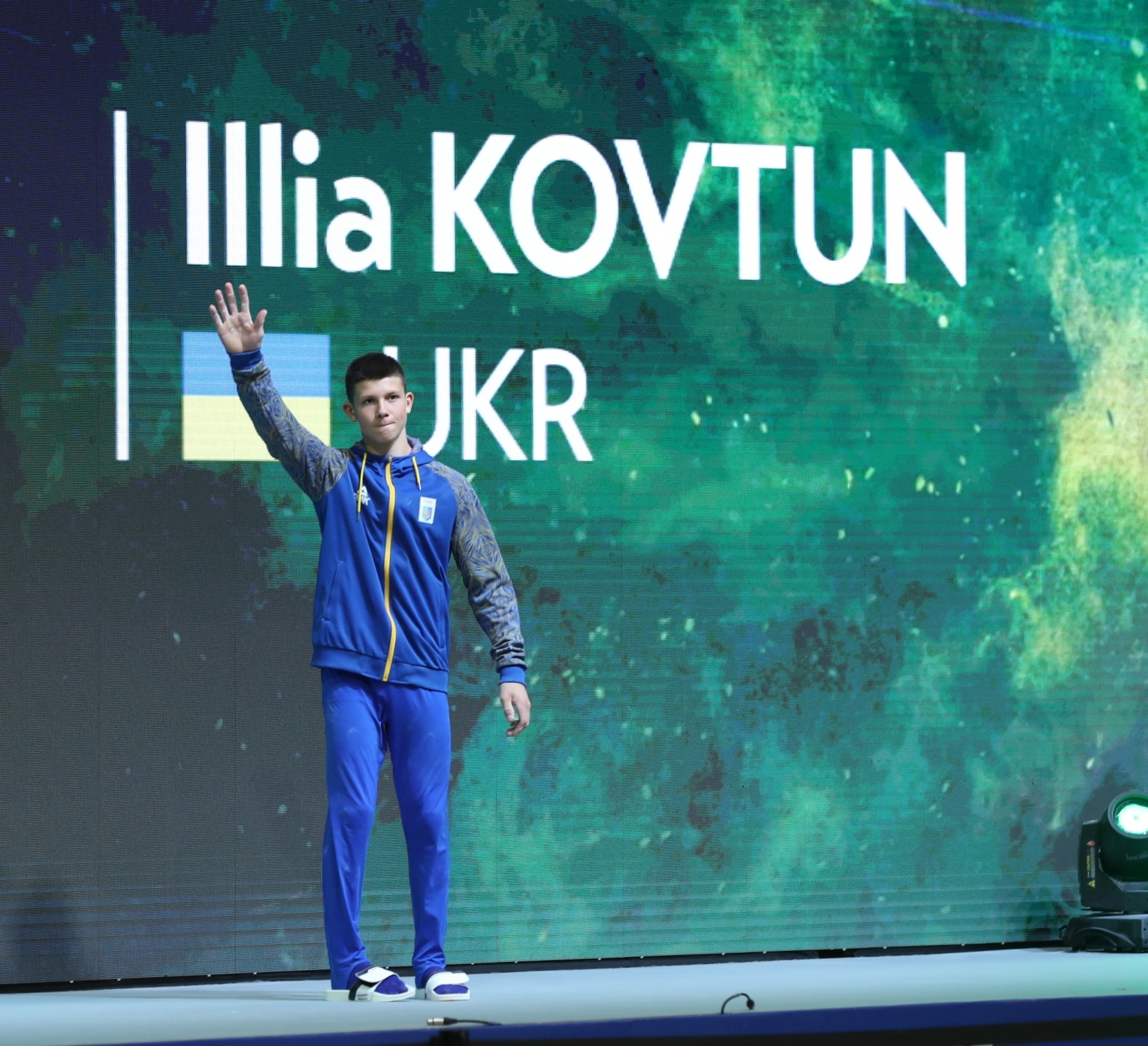
Introduction

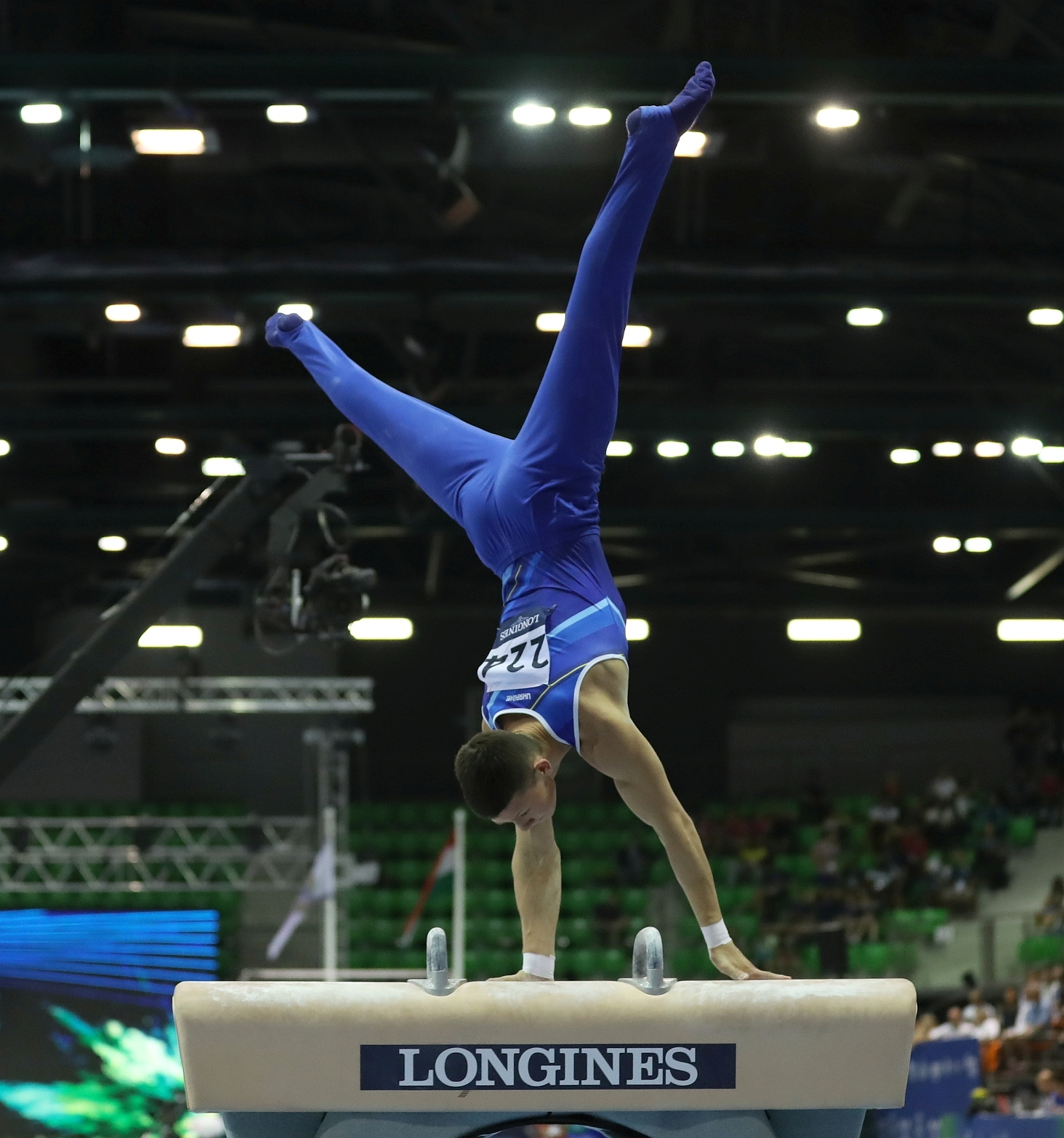
Pommel horse

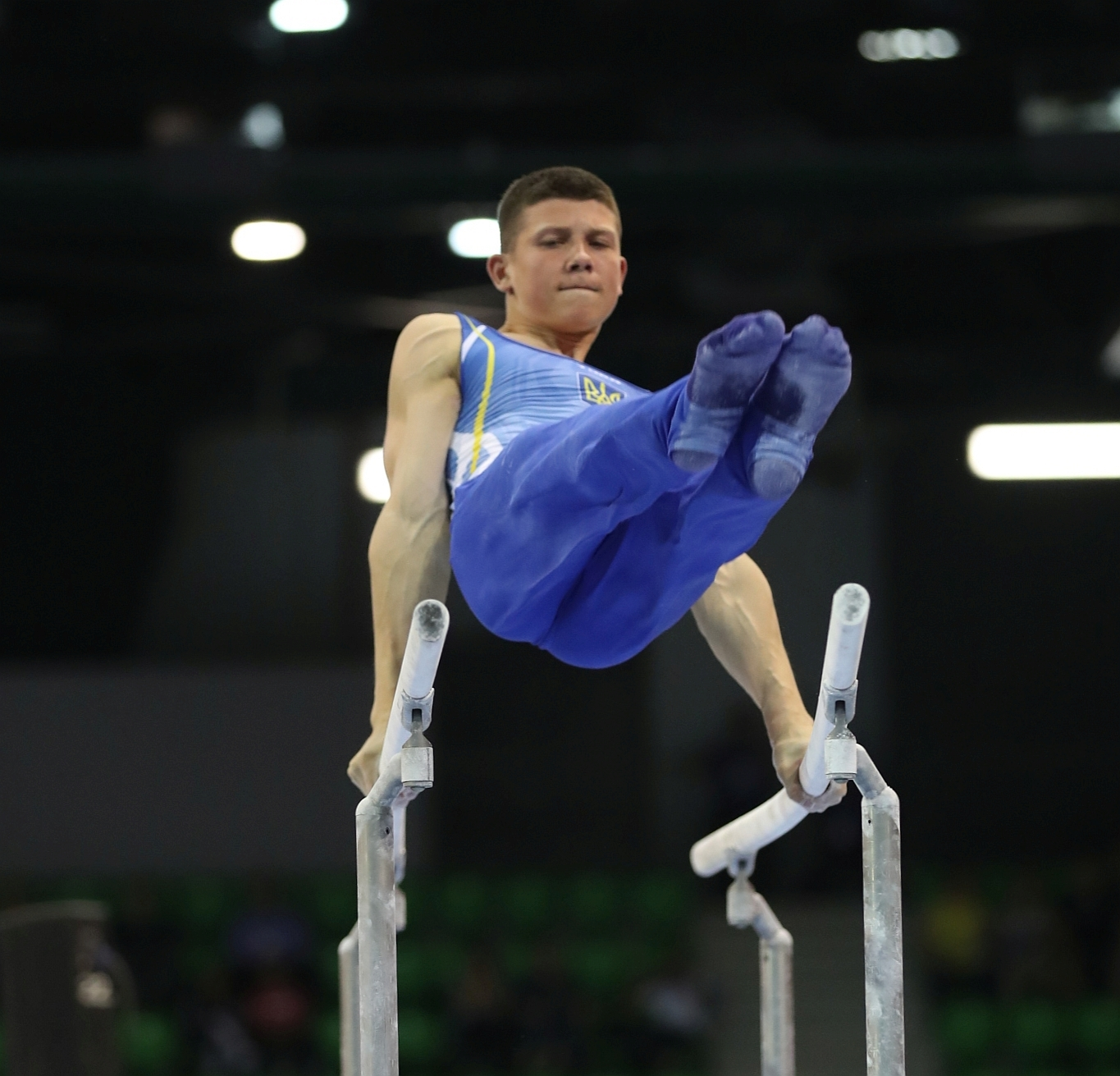
Parallel bars

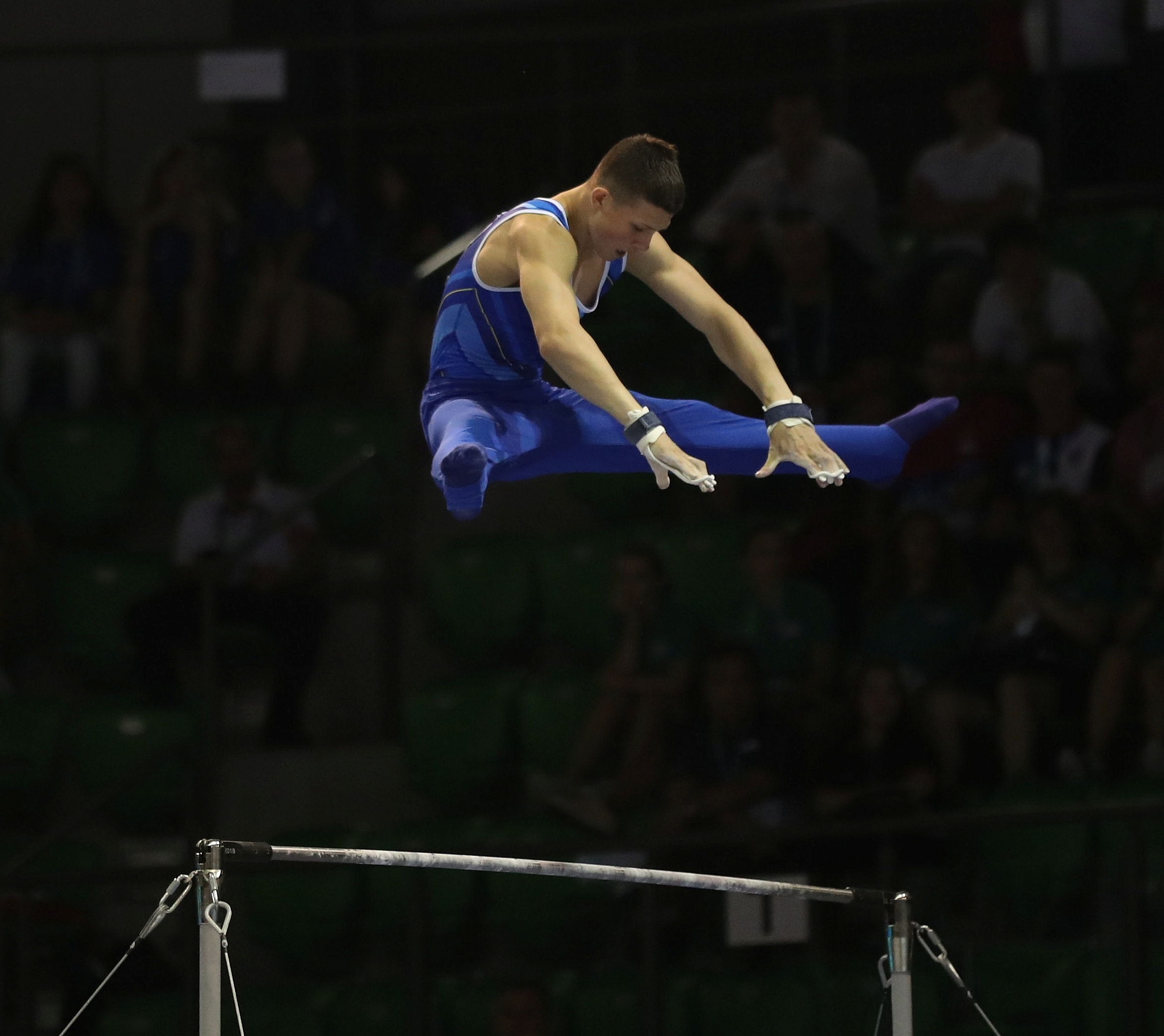
Horizontal bar

Kovtun at the 2019 Junior World Championships (more photos)

=== 2020 ===
Kovtun competed at the 2020 European Championships held in Mersin, Turkey. While there, he led the Ukrainian junior team to gold. Individually he won gold in the all-around and on pommel horse, rings, and parallel bars. He also won the silver medal in the junior vault event.

=== 2021 ===
Kovtun turned senior in 2021 and made his senior international debut at the 2021 European Championships. He won the bronze medal in the all-around competition behind Nikita Nagornyy and David Belyavskiy. Kovtun next competed at the World Challenge Cups in Varna and Cairo; he picked up five gold medals and two bronze medals.

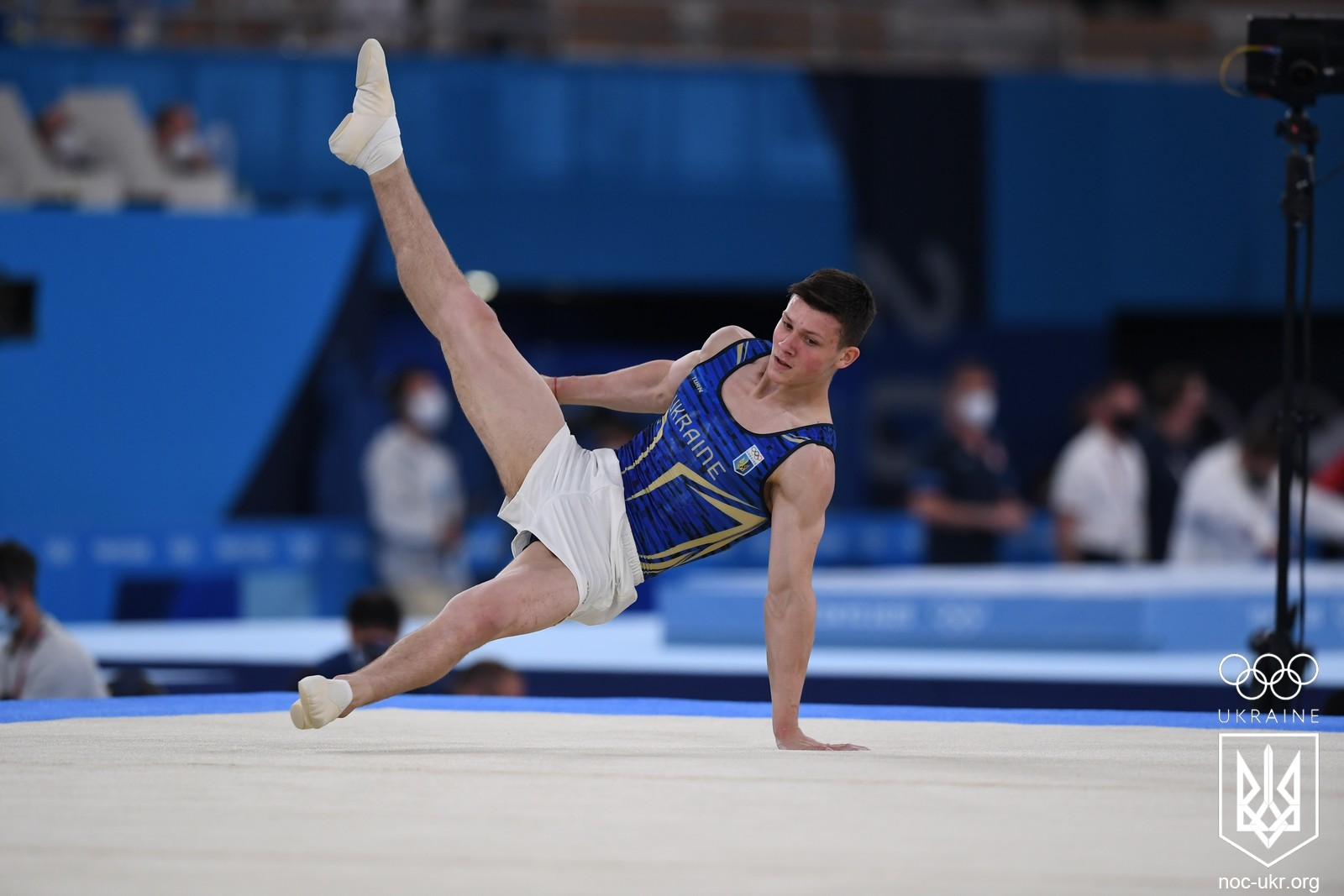
Kovtun at the 2020 Olympic Games

Due to the postponement of the 2020 Summer Olympics, Kovtun was age-eligible to compete at them in 2021. He was named to represent Ukraine alongside Petro Pakhnyuk, Igor Radivilov, and Yevhen Yudenkov. They qualified for the team final, and individually Kovtun qualified for the all-around final. During the team final, Kovtun competed on floor exercise, pommel horse, parallel bars, and high bar, contributing towards Ukraine's seventh-place finish. During the all-around final, Kovtun finished 11th.

After the Olympic Games, Kovtun returned to competition at the World Challenge Cups in Koper and Mersin, where he picked up an additional gold and bronze medal and three silvers. He ended up winning the series titles on floor exercise, pommel horse, and parallel bars.

In October, Kovtun competed at the 2021 World Championships where he won the all-around bronze medal behind Zhang Boheng and Hashimoto Daiki. Additionally, he placed seventh on horizontal bar. He next competed at the Arthur Gander Memorial, where he placed third behind Yul Moldauer and Nikita Nagornyy. Kovtun then competed at the Swiss Cup where he was partnered with Yelyzaveta Hubareva; they finished second behind the Russian team of Nagornyy and Angelina Melnikova.

In December, Kovtun was awarded with the title Merited Master of Sports of Ukraine.

=== 2022 ===
Kovtun competed at the Cottbus World Cup in February. On the first day of qualifications, Russia launched a full-scale invasion of Kovtun's home country of Ukraine. Despite news of the ongoing war, Kovtun won gold on parallel bars and silver on pommel horse and finished fourth and fifth on floor exercise and horizontal bar, respectively. Kovtun next competed at the Doha World Cup where he qualified for all six apparatus event finals. On the first day of event finals, he won silver on floor exercise behind Artem Dolgopyat and placed fifth and sixth on pommel horse and rings, respectively. On the second day of event finals, he won gold on parallel bars and bronze on horizontal bar behind Alexander Myakinin and Robert Tvorogal and placed sixth on vault.

Kovtun became "an unwitting symbol of resilience and dignity" when, during the medal ceremony for the parallel bars, Russian gymnast and bronze medalist Ivan Kuliak taunted Kovtun by wearing a Z on his chest - a symbol of support for the Russian invasion. Kovtun did not visibly react to the taunt, and Kuliak was heavily sanctioned by the International Gymnastics Federation. At the Cairo World Cup, Kovtun won his third consecutive gold medal on the parallel bars. Kovtun finished the World Cup circuit competing at the Baku World Cup. He won his fourth consecutive gold medal on the parallel bars, completing a clean sweep of the titles. Additionally, he won the bronze medal on the horizontal bar.

Due to the ongoing war, Kovtun did not return to Ukraine. His team was given shelter by gymnastics clubs in European countries where they could train in exile and prepare for future competitions. For the first couple of days, the refugees were hosted by Blau-Weiss Buchholz, a German club, before they spent the next two months in the Palestra Ginnastica Ferrara in Italy. From their temporary training places, the team participated in national and international competitions. Kovtun competed several times for the Monaco gymnastics club in the French league. In the middle of June 2022, the group of about 15 people, including coaches and a few family members, moved to a gym in Osijek, Croatia.

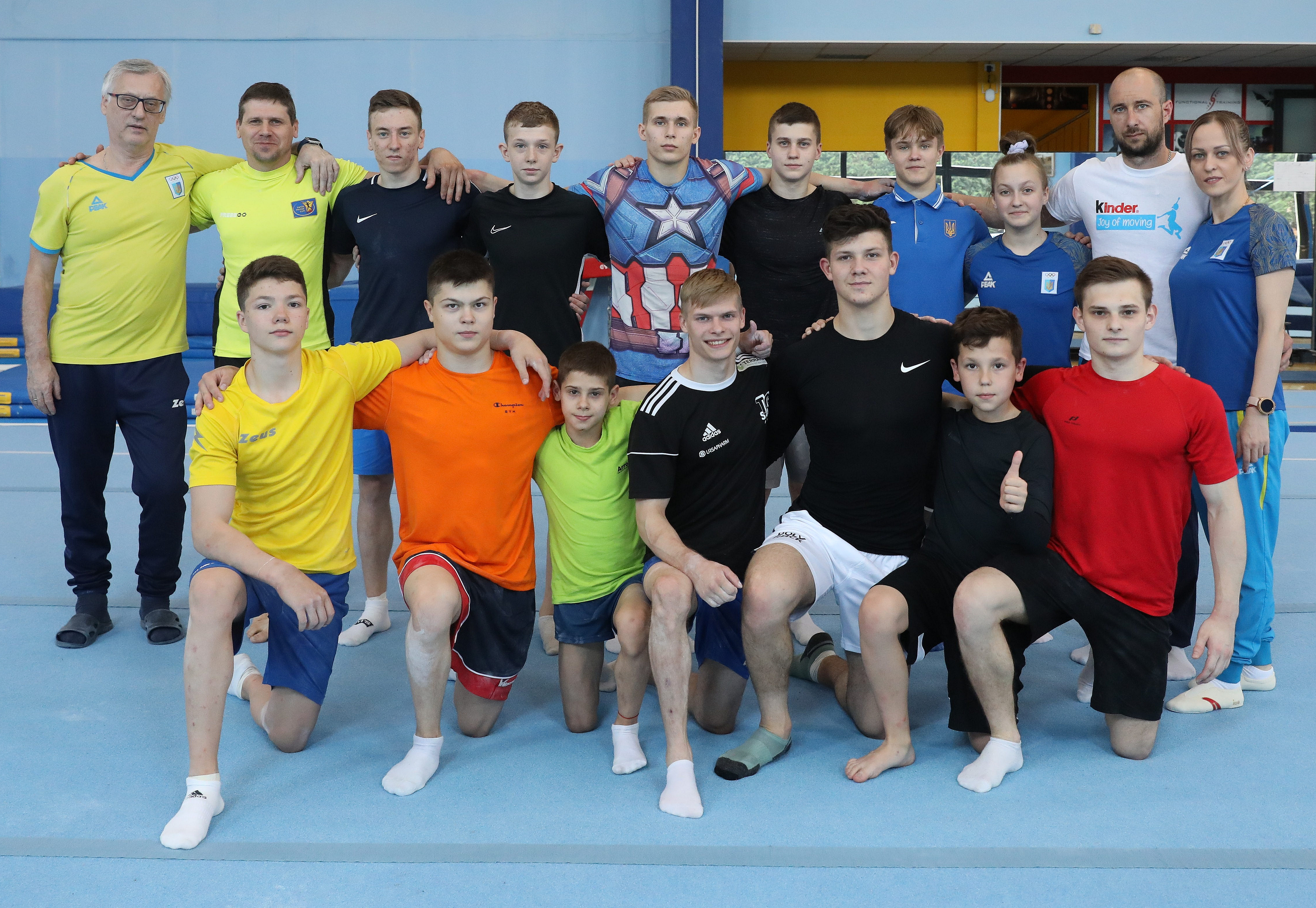
Kovtun and his team

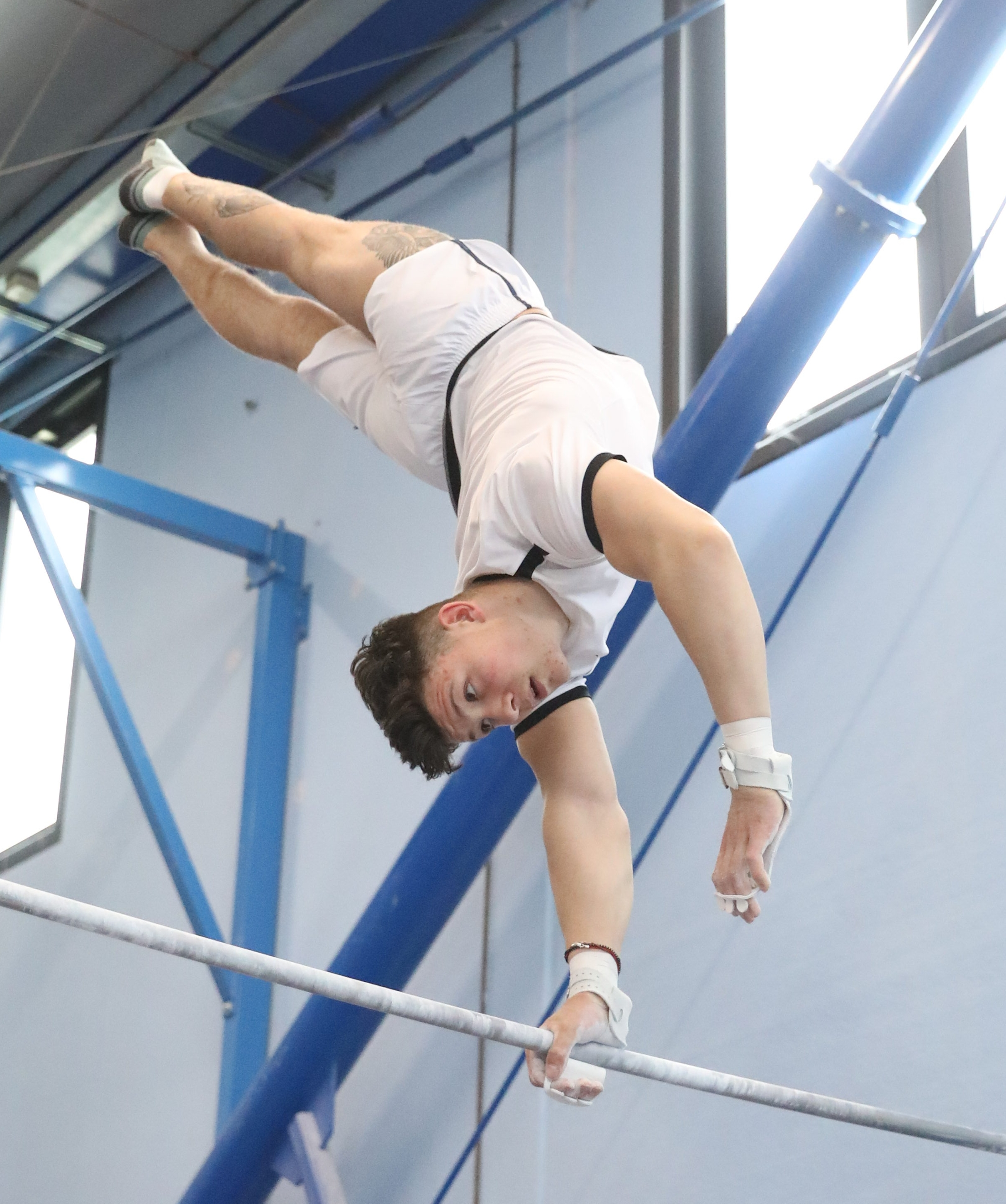
Horizontal bar

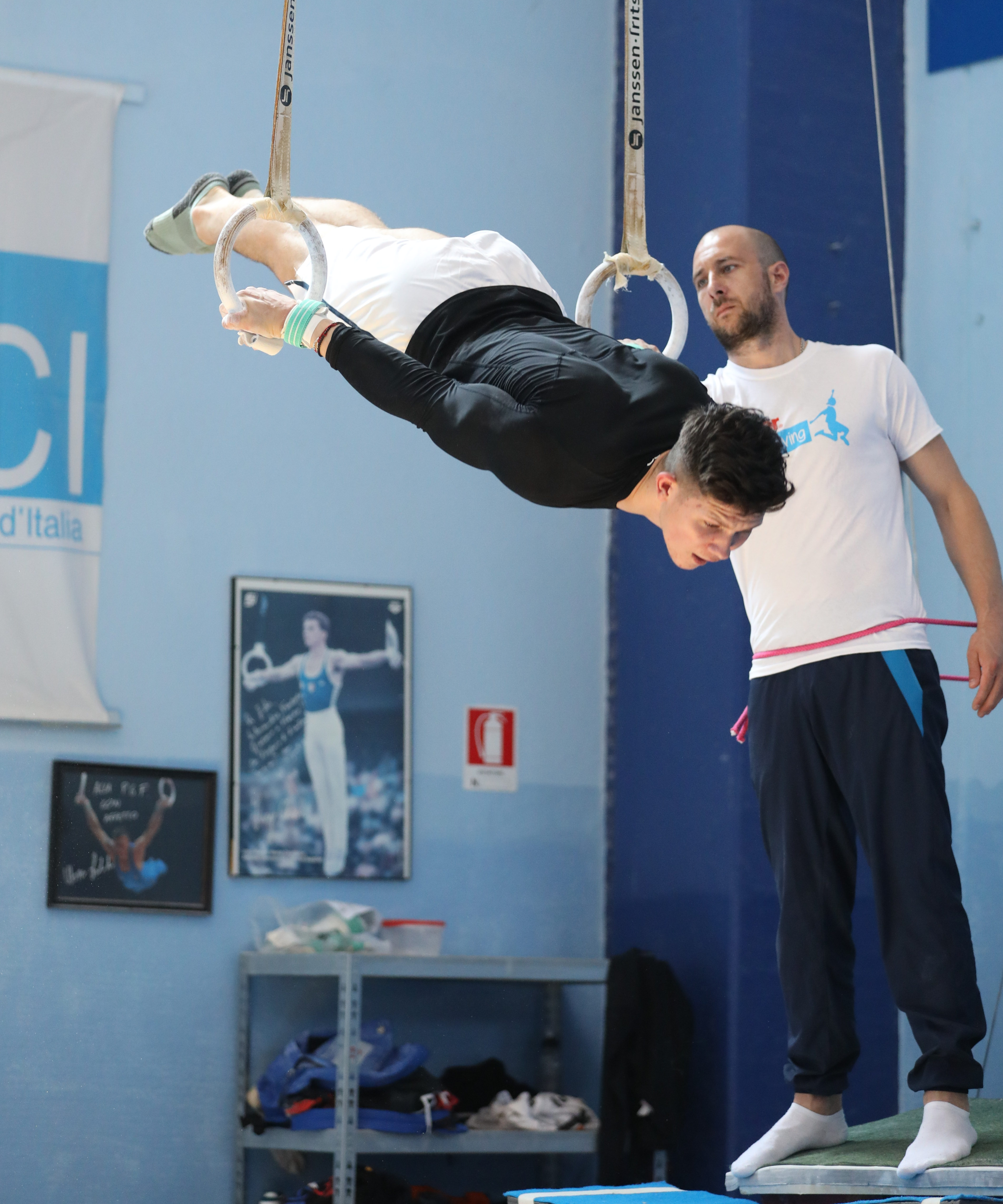
Still rings

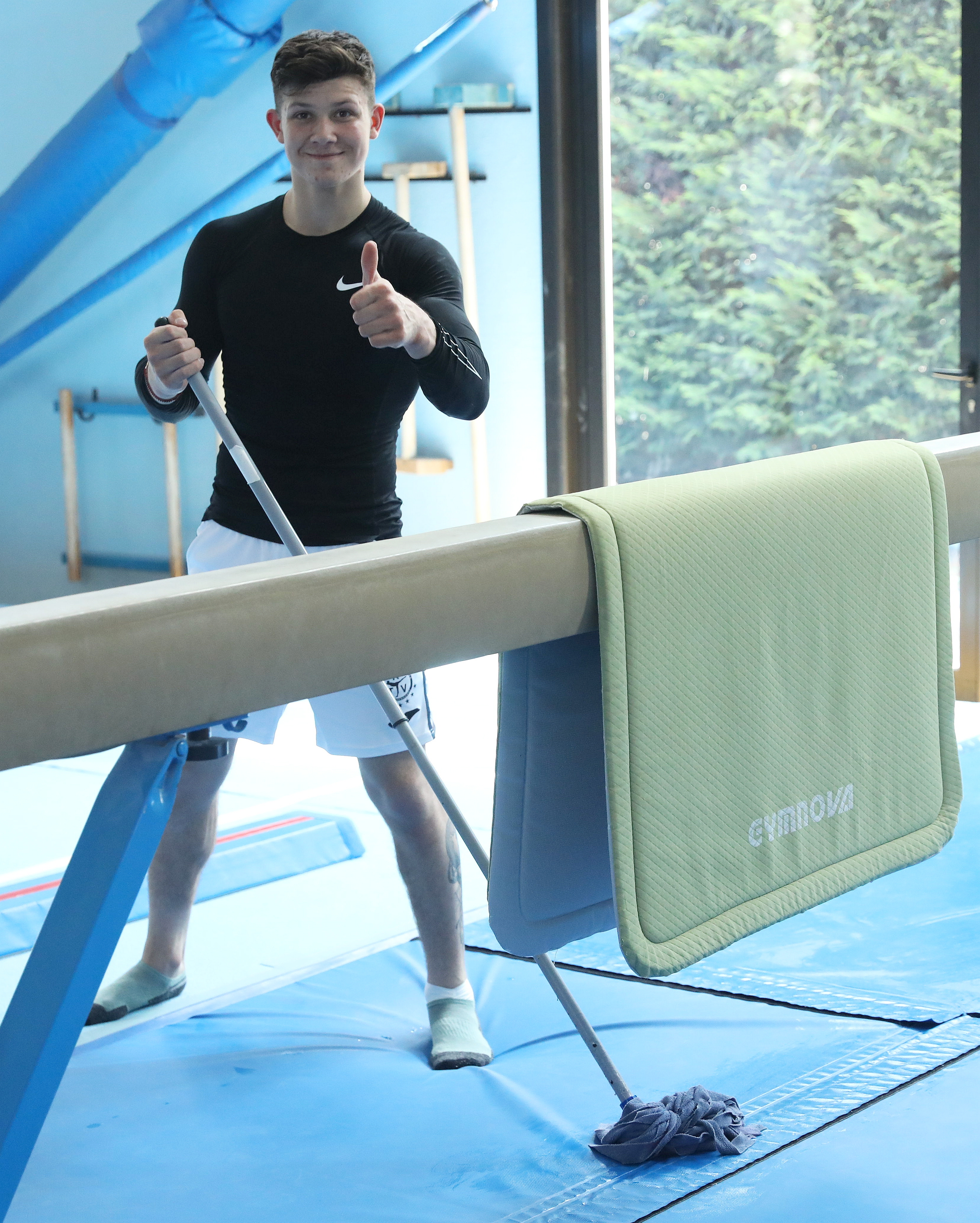
Cleaning up the gym hall

Kovtun in a training session in the Italian exile (more photos)

In August, Kovtun competed at the European Championships. On the first day of competition, he finished eleventh in the all-around and helped Ukraine finish ninth as a team during qualifications. Although they didn't qualify for the team final, they qualified a whole team to compete at the upcoming World Championships. Individually, Kovtun qualified for the floor exercise and parallel bars finals. During the floor exercise final, Kovtun finished fifth. During the parallel bars final, Kovtun recorded the highest score, a 15.333, but lost a tie-break to Joe Fraser of the United Kingdom and took home the silver medal. At the Szombathely Challenge Cup Kovtun earned gold on both floor exercise and parallel bars.

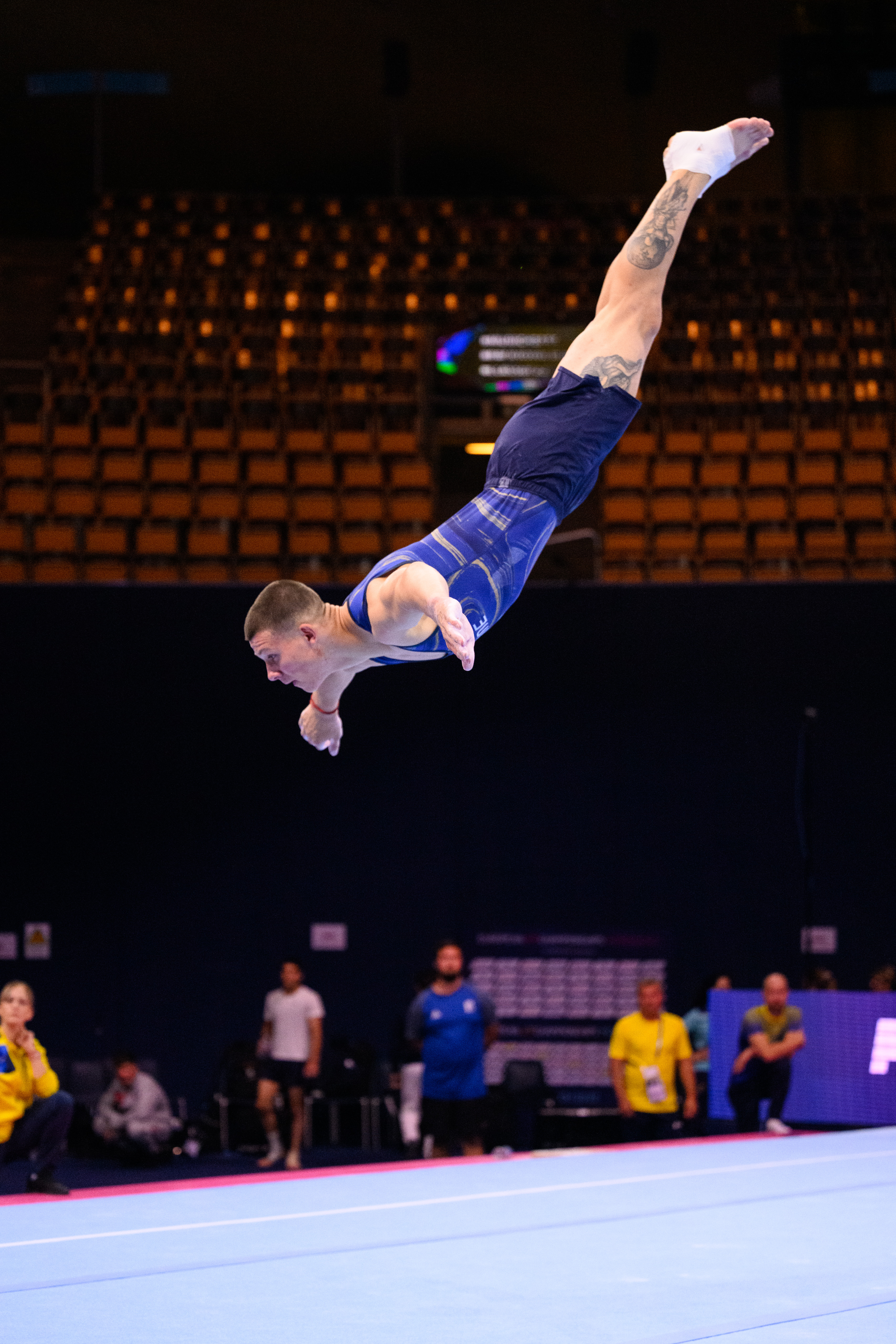
Floor exercise

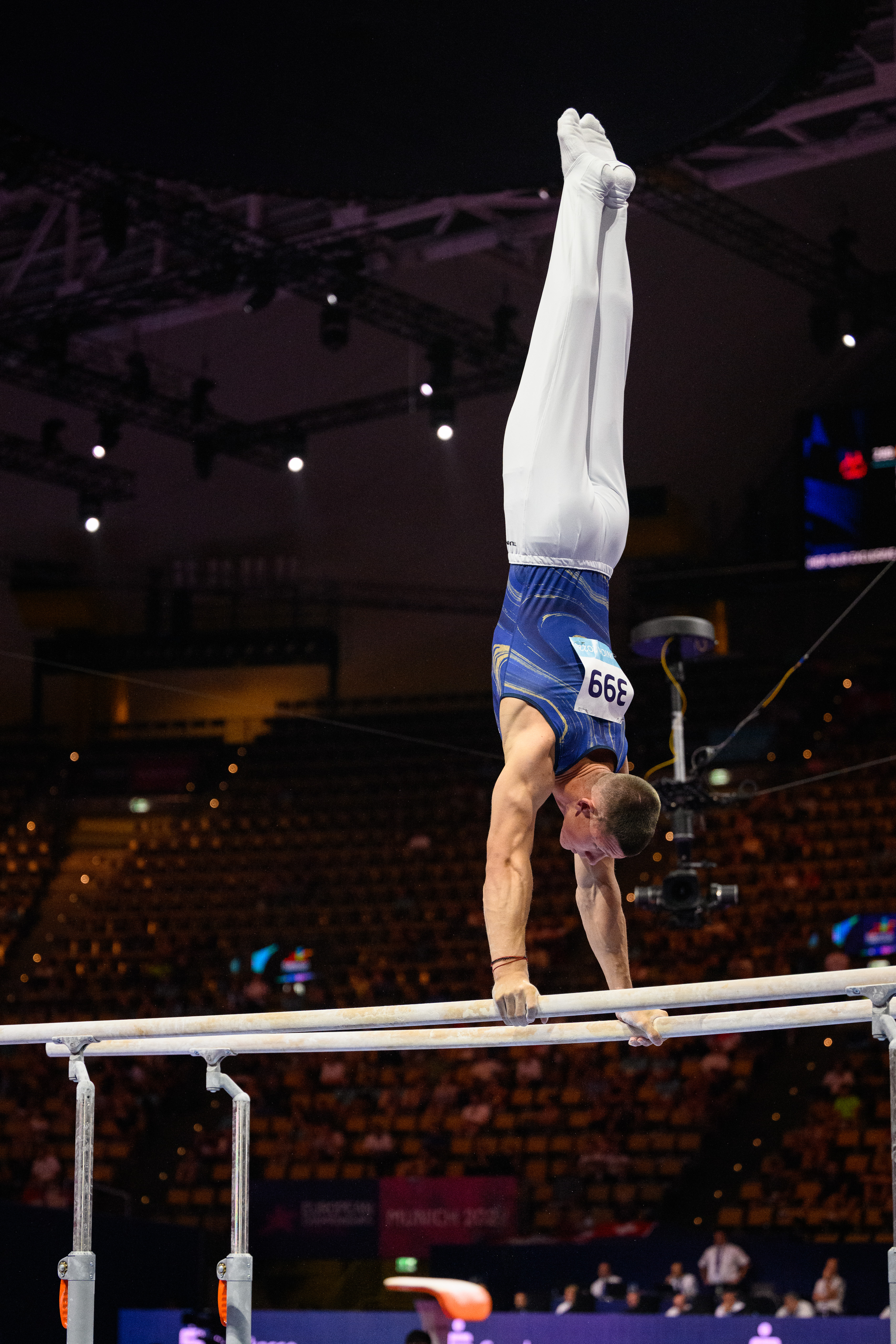
Parallel bars

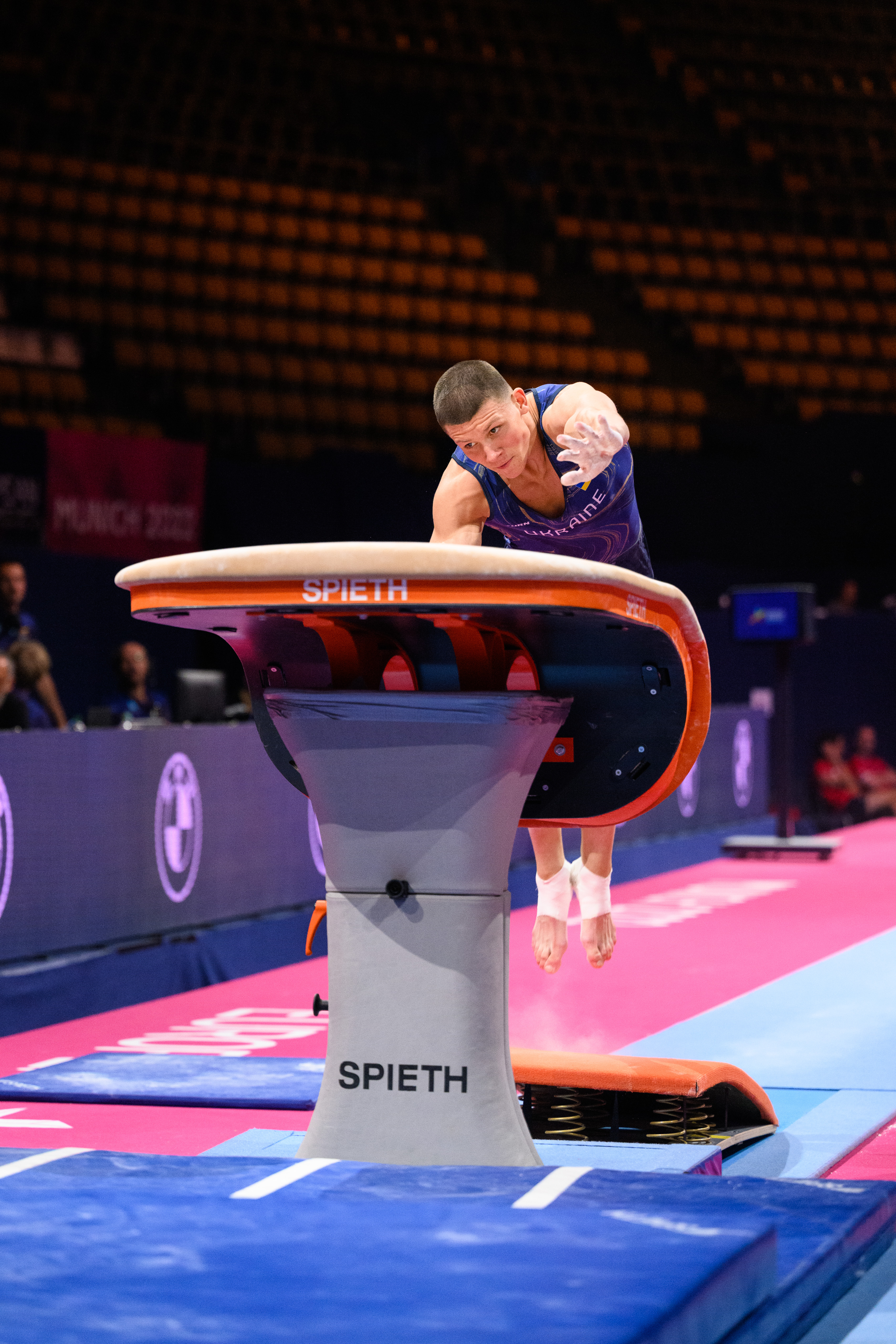
Vault

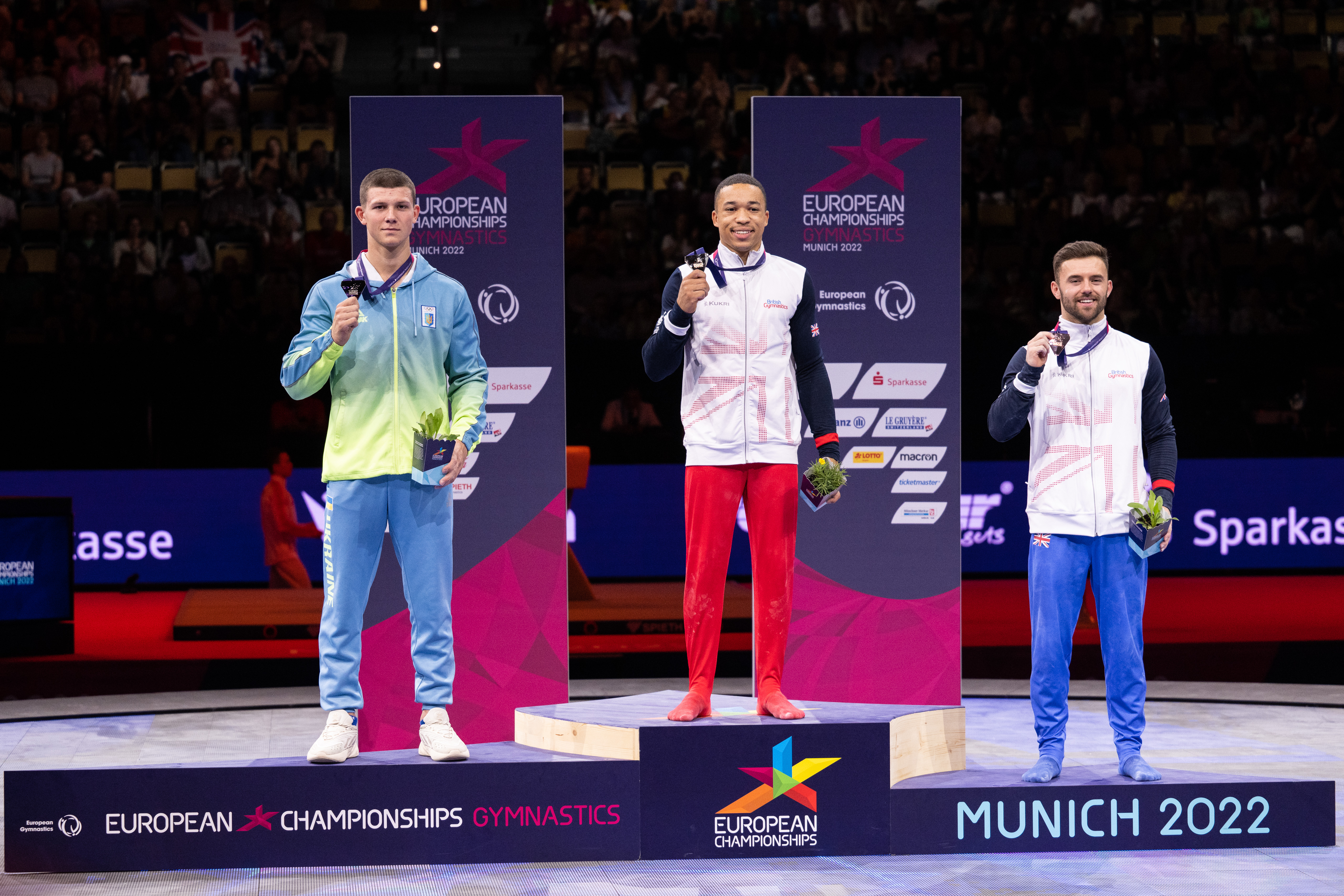
Parallel bars medal podium

Kovtun at the 2022 European Championships (more photos)

In late October through early November, Kovtun competed at the World Championships. While there, he qualified for the all-around final and was the first reserve for the parallel bars final. He finished seventh in the all-around. He next competed at the Arthur Gander Memorial, where he placed first in the four-event all-around despite a rough start on floor exercise.

=== 2023 ===
Kovtun competed at the World Cups in Cottbus, Doha, and Baku. He won gold on parallel bars in Cottbus and Doha and silver in Baku behind Carlos Yulo. Additionally, he won silver on floor exercise behind Milad Karimi in Baku. At the European Championships, Kovtun became the European Champion on parallel bars, which is his first major title in his senior career. Additionally he won bronze in the all-around and on horizontal bar. At the Cairo World Cup, Kovtun won gold on floor exercise, parallel bars, and horizontal bar and picked up bronze on pommel horse.

In October, Kovtun competed at the 2023 World Championships alongside Nazar Chepurnyi, Igor Radivilov, Radomyr Stelmakh, and Oleg Verniaiev. During qualifications, they finished twelfth as a team and qualified a full team to the 2024 Olympic Games. Individually, Kovtun qualified for the all-around and parallel bar finals. During the all-around final Kovtun finished second behind reigning World Champion Daiki Hashimoto. In winning the silver medal, Kovtun set the record for Ukraine's highest all-around placement at the World Championships, beating the record Verniaiev set in 2019 and Kovtun himself matched in 2021. During the parallel bars final, Kovtun finished fifth.

=== 2024 ===
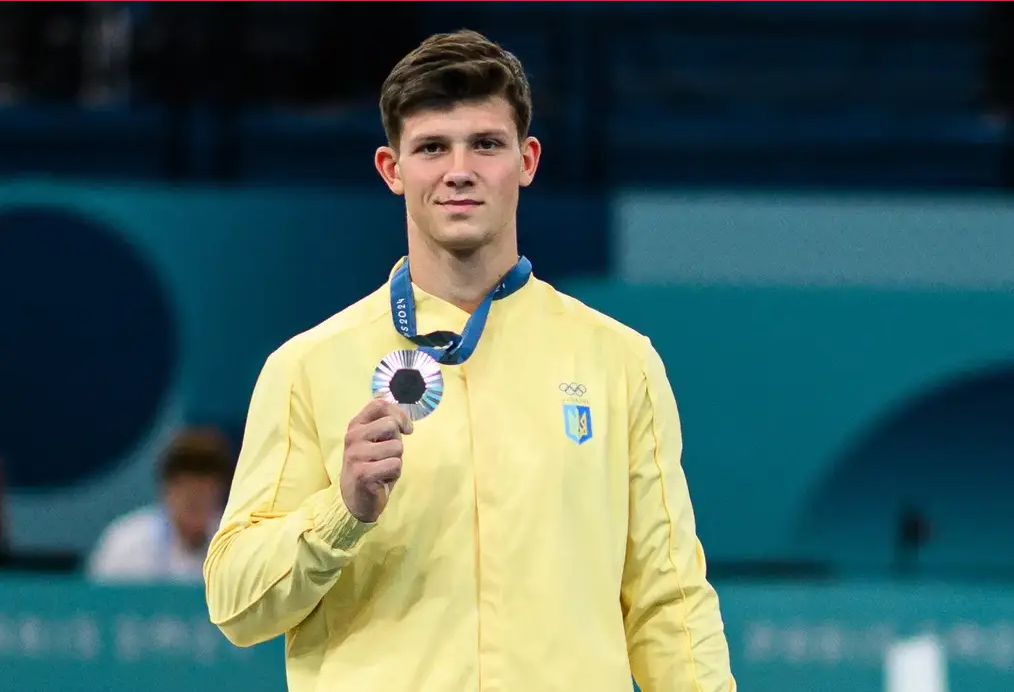
Kovtun with his Olympic silver medal at Paris 2024

Kovtun competed at the World Cups in Cairo, Cottbus, and Baku; he won gold on the parallel bars at each competition. He next competed at the Osijek Challenge Cup where he won gold on floor exercise and silver on parallel bars behind Lukas Dauser. In late April Kovtun competed at the European Championships alongside Nazar Chepurnyi, Igor Radivilov, Radomyr Stelmakh, and Oleg Verniaiev; together they qualified to the team final in first place and individually Kovtun qualified to the parallel bars and horizontal bars finals. Additionally, Kovtun finished sixth in the all-around. During event finals Kovtun won gold on both apparatuses. During the team final Kovtun contributed scores on pommel horse, rings, parallel bars, and horizontal bar towards Ukraine's first-place finish.

Kovtun competed at the 2024 Olympic Games alongside Chepurnyi, Radivilov, Stelmakh, and Verniaiev. During the qualification round, Kovtun helped Ukraine qualify for the team final, and individually he qualified for the all-around, floor exercise, and parallel bars finals. During the team final, Kovtun contributed scores on all apparatuses except vault towards Ukraine's fifth-place finish. During the all-around final Kovtun competed cleanly on all six apparatuses, finishing the event in fourth place, just 0.199 points behind bronze medalist Xiao Ruoteng. In the parallel bars final Kovtun earned a score of 15.500 to win the silver medal behind reigning Olympic parallel bars champion Zou Jingyuan.

=== 2025–2026 ===
In July 2025, the International Gymnastics Federation approved Kovtun's nationality change, allowing him to represent Croatia in international competition. However, he was not be able to compete until 10 July 2026 as Ukraine did not consent to the nationality change, resulting in a one-year hold.

After his hold expired, it was announced that Kovtun would make his debut for Croatia at the Croatian-hosted 2026 European Championships. On the first day of the competition, Kovtun won his first European all-around title, one-thousandth of a point ahead of Arsenii Dukhno. During event finals, he placed fourth on floor exercise and horizontal bar and won gold on parallel bars.

At the 2026 World Championships in Rotterdam, Kovtun won silver on the parallel bars, earning Croatia its first ever medal on the apparatus at a World Championships.

== Personal life ==
Kovtun has resided in Osijek, Croatia since the 2022 Russian invasion of Ukraine. He acquired Croatian citizenship in 2025.

== Competitive history ==
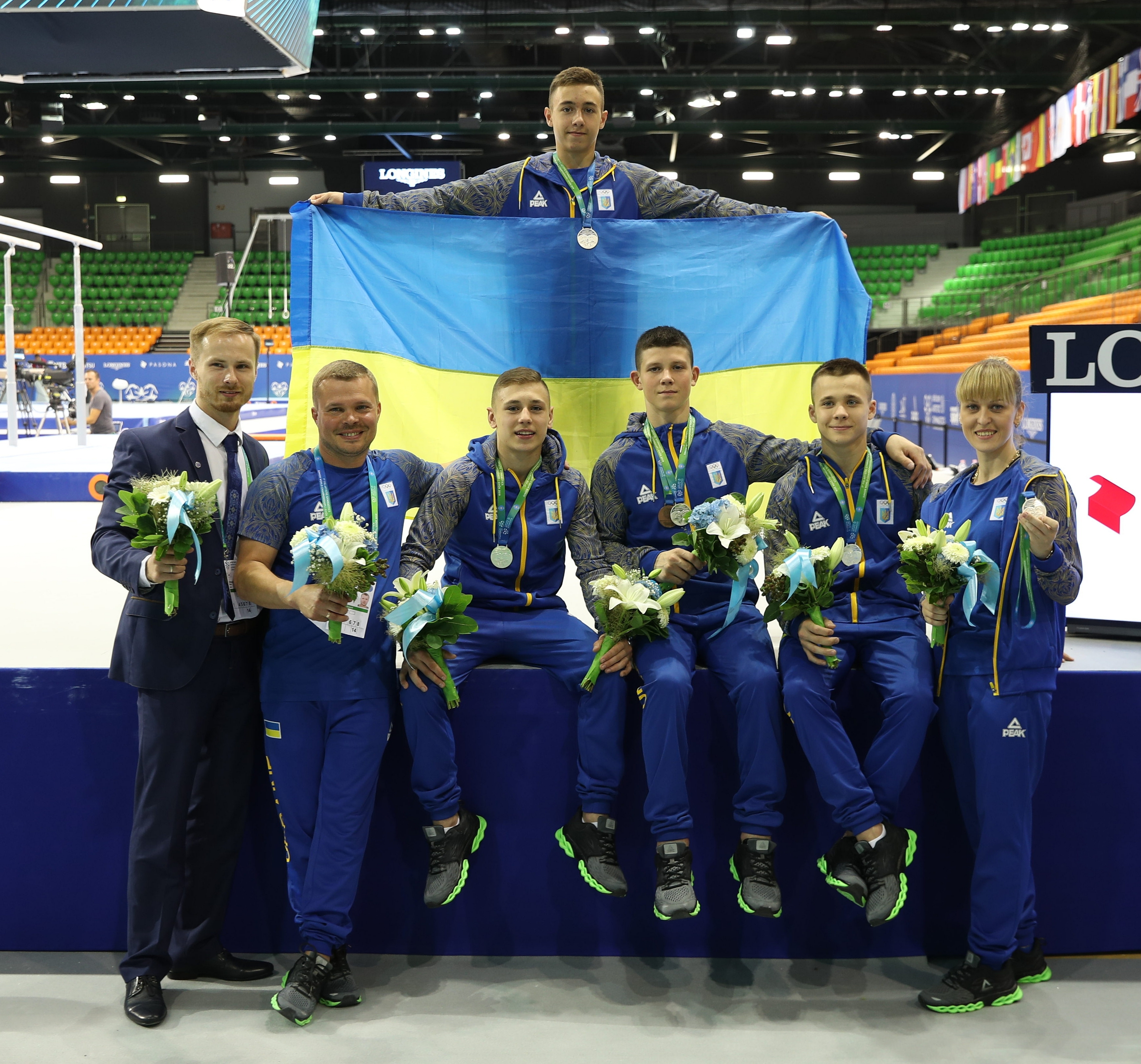
Kovtun and the Ukrainian delegation at the 2019 Junior World Championships

=== Representing Ukraine ===
Competitive history of Illia Kovtun at the junior level
Year	Event	Team	AA	FX	PH	SR	VT	PB	HB
2014	Kyiv Open Championships		1st place, gold medalist(s)						
2015	Ukrainian Championships	1st place, gold medalist(s)	2nd place, silver medalist(s)						
2015	«Dnipro Waves» Championships		1st place, gold medalist(s)						
2015	Beresh Cup		1st place, gold medalist(s)						
2015	Cherkasy Regional Championships		1st place, gold medalist(s)						
2017	Barborka Cup	2nd place, silver medalist(s)	1st place, gold medalist(s)						
2017	Ukrainian Championships	1st place, gold medalist(s)	1st place, gold medalist(s)						
2017	Ukraine International Cup		2nd place, silver medalist(s)	1st place, gold medalist(s)	2nd place, silver medalist(s)		2nd place, silver medalist(s)	1st place, gold medalist(s)	1st place, gold medalist(s)
2017	3rd International Budapest		1st place, gold medalist(s)	1st place, gold medalist(s)	1st place, gold medalist(s)	1st place, gold medalist(s)	1st place, gold medalist(s)	7	1st place, gold medalist(s)
2017	Junior Japan International		15						
2018	President's Cup		2nd place, silver medalist(s)						
2018	European Championships	5						1st place, gold medalist(s)	
2018	Swiss Cup Juniors	1st place, gold medalist(s)	2nd place, silver medalist(s)						
2019	Ukraine International Cup	2nd place, silver medalist(s)	1st place, gold medalist(s)	6	2nd place, silver medalist(s)	2nd place, silver medalist(s)	2nd place, silver medalist(s)	2nd place, silver medalist(s)	2nd place, silver medalist(s)
2019	Ukrainian Championships		1st place, gold medalist(s)	2nd place, silver medalist(s)	2nd place, silver medalist(s)	2nd place, silver medalist(s)	3rd place, bronze medalist(s)	1st place, gold medalist(s)	1st place, gold medalist(s)
2019	Junior World Championships	2nd place, silver medalist(s)	3rd place, bronze medalist(s)		6			4	
2019	Euro Youth Olympic Festival	1st place, gold medalist(s)	1st place, gold medalist(s)	2nd place, silver medalist(s)		13		1st place, gold medalist(s)	1st place, gold medalist(s)
2019	European Games Test Event		2nd place, silver medalist(s)	6	1st place, gold medalist(s)	6	4	2nd place, silver medalist(s)	1st place, gold medalist(s)
2020	Ukraine International Cup	1st place, gold medalist(s)	1st place, gold medalist(s)	1st place, gold medalist(s)		1st place, gold medalist(s)		1st place, gold medalist(s)	1st place, gold medalist(s)
2020	European Championships	1st place, gold medalist(s)	1st place, gold medalist(s)		1st place, gold medalist(s)	1st place, gold medalist(s)	2nd place, silver medalist(s)	1st place, gold medalist(s)	7
2020	Ukrainian Championship	2nd place, silver medalist(s)	1st place, gold medalist(s)	1st place, gold medalist(s)	1st place, gold medalist(s)	1st place, gold medalist(s)	3rd place, bronze medalist(s)	1st place, gold medalist(s)	1st place, gold medalist(s)
2020	Kyiv Championships		1st place, gold medalist(s)						

Competitive history of Illia Kovtun at the senior level
Year	Event	Team	AA	FX	PH	SR	VT	PB	HB
2021	1st Italian Serie A2	3rd place, bronze medalist(s)							
2021	2nd Italian Serie A2	1st place, gold medalist(s)							
2021	Ukrainian Championship	4	1st place, gold medalist(s)	1st place, gold medalist(s)	1st place, gold medalist(s)	4	3rd place, bronze medalist(s)	1st place, gold medalist(s)	
2021	3rd Italian Serie A2	3rd place, bronze medalist(s)							
2021	European Championships		3rd place, bronze medalist(s)		8			5	
2021	Ukraine International Cup	1st place, gold medalist(s)	1st place, gold medalist(s)	3rd place, bronze medalist(s)	1st place, gold medalist(s)		6	1st place, gold medalist(s)	2nd place, silver medalist(s)
2021	Varna World Challenge Cup			4	1st place, gold medalist(s)			1st place, gold medalist(s)	
2021	Cairo World Challenge Cup			1st place, gold medalist(s)	1st place, gold medalist(s)	8	3rd place, bronze medalist(s)	3rd place, bronze medalist(s)	1st place, gold medalist(s)
2021	Olympic Games	7	11						
2021	Koper World Challenge Cup			3rd place, bronze medalist(s)	2nd place, silver medalist(s)			8	
2021	Mersin World Challenge Cup			2nd place, silver medalist(s)	2nd place, silver medalist(s)			1st place, gold medalist(s)	6
2021	Hungarian Grand Prix			1st place, gold medalist(s)	2nd place, silver medalist(s)	6	5	1st place, gold medalist(s)	1st place, gold medalist(s)
2021	World Championships		3rd place, bronze medalist(s)	R2					7
2021	Arthur Gander Memorial		3rd place, bronze medalist(s)						
2021	Swiss Cup	2nd place, silver medalist(s)							
2021	1st German Bundesliga	3rd place, bronze medalist(s)							
2022	Cottbus World Cup			4	2nd place, silver medalist(s)			1st place, gold medalist(s)	5
2022	Doha World Cup			2nd place, silver medalist(s)	5	6	6	1st place, gold medalist(s)	3rd place, bronze medalist(s)
2022	Cairo World Cup							1st place, gold medalist(s)	
2022	Baku World Cup			4				1st place, gold medalist(s)	3rd place, bronze medalist(s)
2022	Israel Open Championships	3rd place, bronze medalist(s)						1st place, gold medalist(s)	
2022	European Championships	R1	11	5				2nd place, silver medalist(s)	
2022	Szombathely Challenge Cup			1st place, gold medalist(s)				1st place, gold medalist(s)	
2022	World Championships	21	7					R1	
2022	Arthur Gander Memorial		1st place, gold medalist(s)						
2022	1st German Bundesliga	4							
2023	Cottbus World Cup						5	1st place, gold medalist(s)	5
2023	Doha World Cup				5			1st place, gold medalist(s)	5
2023	Baku World Cup			2nd place, silver medalist(s)	5			2nd place, silver medalist(s)	
2023	European Championships	9	3rd place, bronze medalist(s)	6	5			1st place, gold medalist(s)	3rd place, bronze medalist(s)
2023	Cairo World Cup			1st place, gold medalist(s)	3rd place, bronze medalist(s)			1st place, gold medalist(s)	1st place, gold medalist(s)
2023	Serie A1 Final Six	3rd place, bronze medalist(s)							
2023	Osijek Challenge Cup				3rd place, bronze medalist(s)	6	8	1st place, gold medalist(s)	6
2023	World Championships	12	2nd place, silver medalist(s)					5	
2023	1st German Bundesliga	1st place, gold medalist(s)							
2024	Cairo World Cup				8			1st place, gold medalist(s)	
2024	Cottbus World Cup				4			1st place, gold medalist(s)	
2024	Baku World Cup			8				1st place, gold medalist(s)	
2024	Osijek Challenge Cup			1st place, gold medalist(s)		WD		2nd place, silver medalist(s)	
2024	European Championships	1st place, gold medalist(s)	6					1st place, gold medalist(s)	1st place, gold medalist(s)
2024	Koper Challenge Cup			1st place, gold medalist(s)	1st place, gold medalist(s)	2nd place, silver medalist(s)		1st place, gold medalist(s)	6
2024	Olympic Games	5	4	4				2nd place, silver medalist(s)	
2024	Arthur Gander Memorial		1st place, gold medalist(s)						

=== Representing Croatia ===
Competitive history of Illia Kovtun
Year	Event	Team	AA	FX	PH	SR	VT	PB	HB
2025	Croatian Championships		1st place, gold medalist(s)						
2026
2026	European Championships		1st place, gold medalist(s)	4				1st place, gold medalist(s)	4
2026	World Championships		11					2nd place, silver medalist(s)	

== Eponymous skills ==
Kovtun has one skill named after him on parallel bars.

Apparatus	Name	Description	Difficulty	Added to Code of Points
Parallel Bars	Kovtun	Back toss from upper arm with quarter turn to one rail	C (0.3)	2021 World Cup Koper
