= Yuriy Yermakov =

Ukrainian gymnast (born 1970)

- Юрій Володимирович Єрмаков
- Full name: Yuriy Volodymyrovych Yermakov
- Born: 3 September 1970 (age 56) Makiïvka, Ukrainian SSR, Soviet Union

Gymnastics career
- Discipline: Men's artistic gymnastics
- Country represented: Ukraine
Medal record
Men's artistic gymnastics
Representing Ukraine
Olympic Games
Bronze medal – third place	1996 Atlanta	Team
World Championships
Bronze medal – third place	1994 Dortmund	Team
European Championships
Silver medal – second place	1996 Copenhagen	Team
European Cup Final
Bronze medal – third place	1993 Brussels	Parallel bars

Yuriy Volodymyrovych Yermakov (born 3 September 1970) is a Ukrainian gymnast. He competed in seven events at the 1996 Summer Olympics, winning a bronze medal in the men's artistic team all-around event.
