= Vadym Kuvakin =

Ukrainian gymnast (born 1984)

- Вадим Вікторович Кувакін
- Full name: Vadym Viktorovych Kuvakin
- Born: 4 May 1984 (age 42) Kherson, Ukrainian SSR, Soviet Union
- Height: 1.71 m (5 ft 7 in)

Gymnastics career
- Discipline: Men's artistic gymnastics
- Country represented: Ukraine

Vadym Viktorovych Kuvakin (born 4 May 1984) is a Ukrainian gymnast. He competed at the 2004 Summer Olympics.
