= Rustam Sharipov =

Ukrainian gymnast (born 1971)

- Рустам Халімджанович Шаріпов
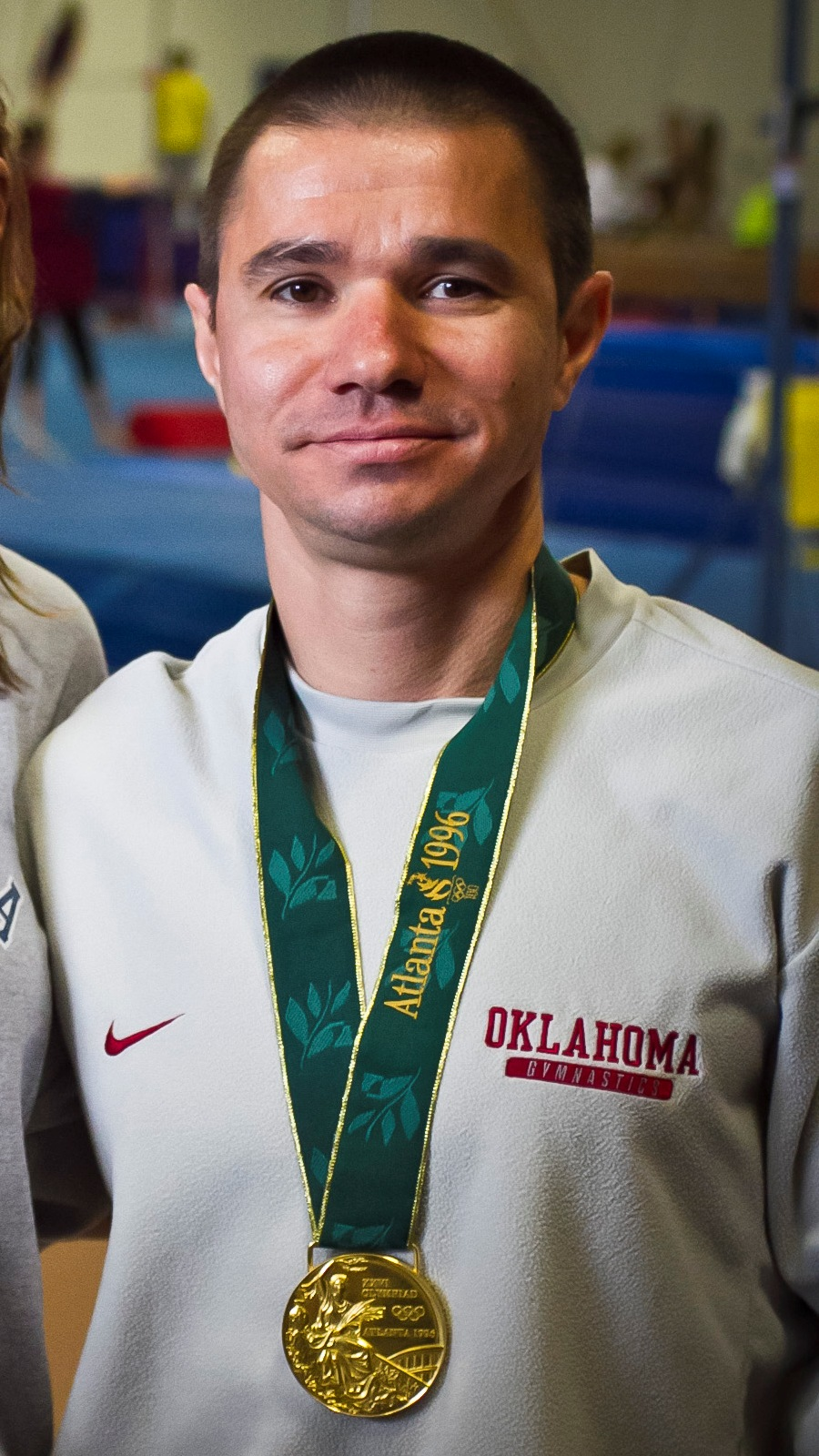

Personal information
- Full name: Rustam Khalimdzhanovych Sharipov
- Alternative names: Rustam Khalimdzhanovich Sharipov; Рустам Халимджанович Шарипов
- Born: 2 June 1971 (age 55) Dushanbe, Tajik SSR, Soviet Union
- Height: 1.63 m (5 ft 4 in)

Gymnastics career
- Discipline: Men's artistic gymnastics
- Country represented: Ukraine
- Former countries represented: Soviet Union
- Club: Dynamo Kharkiv
Medal record
Men's artistic gymnastics
Representing Unified Team
Olympic Games
Gold medal – first place	1992 Barcelona	Team
Representing Ukraine
Olympic Games
Gold medal – first place	1996 Atlanta	Parallel bars
Bronze medal – third place	1996 Atlanta	Team
World Championships
Gold medal – first place	1996 San Juan	Parallel bars
Silver medal – second place	1994 Brisbane	Parallel bars
Bronze medal – third place	1994 Dortmund	Team
European Championships
Gold medal – first place	1992 Budapest	Horizontal bar
Gold medal – first place	1994 Prague	Parallel bars
Gold medal – first place	1996 Copenhagen	Parallel bars
Silver medal – second place	1992 Budapest	Parallel bars
Silver medal – second place	1996 Copenhagen	Team

Rustam Khalimdzhanovych Sharipov (born 2 June 1971) is a Ukrainian gymnast and Olympic champion. He won a gold medal at the 1996 Summer Olympics in Atlanta, representing Ukraine, and also a gold medal for the Unified Team at the 1992 Summer Olympics in Barcelona.

== Early life ==
Rustam was born on 2 June 1971 in Dushanbe, then a part of the Tajik Soviet Socialist Republic, to a Ukrainian mother and a Tajik father. He began gymnastics at age 6. Sharipov moved with his family to the Ukrainian Soviet Socialist Republic when he was 15. Training in Kyiv, Sharipov ultimately made the Soviet Union men's national artistic gymnastics team and travelled frequently to Moscow for training.

== Coaching career ==
He became an assistant coach for the Men's Gymnastics team at the University of Oklahoma. In May 2011, he accepted the head coach position at Ohio State University.

== Awards and honors ==
He was inducted to the International Gymnastics Hall of Fame as part of the class of 2024 alongside Carly Patterson, Julianne McNamara, and Josef Stalder.

== Personal life ==
Sharipov married Tatiana Priatseva, with whom he had two children. The family briefly moved to Australia in 1997, but returned to Ukraine within a year. The couple later divorced. Sharipov met Amber Adams while coaching at Bart Connor Gymnastics Academy, and they were married in 2002. The couple had a child in 2003 and Sharipov became a member of The Church of Jesus Christ of Latter-day Saints that same year.
