= Volodymyr Shamenko (gymnast) =

Ukrainian gymnast (born 1972)

- Володимир Володимирович Шаменко
- Full name: Volodymyr Volodymyrovych Shamenko
- Born: 8 August 1972 (age 54) Taraz, Kazakh SSR, Soviet Union
- Spouse: Ludmila Stovbchataya

Gymnastics career
- Discipline: Men's artistic gymnastics
- Country represented: Ukraine
Medal record
Men's artistic gymnastics
Representing Ukraine
Olympic Games
Bronze medal – third place	1996 Atlanta	Team
World Championships
Bronze medal – third place	1994 Dortmund	Team

Volodymyr Volodymyrovych Shamenko (born 8 August 1972) is a Ukrainian gymnast. He competed in seven events at the 1996 Summer Olympics, winning a bronze medal in the men's artistic team all-around event.
