= Gymnastics at the 1996 Summer Olympics – Women's artistic team all-around =

Women's artistic team all-around at the Games of the XXVI Olympiad
- Venue: Georgia Dome
- Date: July 21-23, 1996
- Competitors: 82 from 12 nations

Medalists
1st place, gold medalist(s)		Amanda Borden, Amy Chow, Dominique Dawes, Shannon; Miller, Dominique Moceanu, Jaycie Phelps, and Kerri Strug	United States
2nd place, silver medalist(s)		Elena Dolgopolova, Rozalia Galiyeva, Elena Grosheva, Svetlana Khorkina, Dina Kochetkova, Yevgeniya Kuznetsova, and Oksana Lyapina	Russia
3rd place, bronze medalist(s)		Simona Amânar, Gina Gogean, Ionela Loaieș, Alexandra; Marinescu, Lavinia Miloșovici, and Mirela Țugurlan	Romania

These are the results of the women's team all-around competition, one of six events for female competitors in artistic gymnastics at the 1996 Summer Olympics in Atlanta. The compulsory and optional rounds took place on July 21 and 23 at the Georgia Dome. With their dramatic first-ever gold medal with Kerri Strug competing injured (and later withdrawing from other events), the United States gymnastics team was nicknamed the Magnificent Seven. The format had changed slightly from the 1992 Summer Olympics in Barcelona where instead of 6 members, national teams were made up of 7 members. Following the rules of what was known as the "7–6–5" format, 6 athletes performed on each apparatus, but only the top 5 scores counted towards the final combined score at the end, dropping the lowest score.

The medals for the competition were presented by Alexandru Siperco, IOC Member, Romania, and the medalists' bouquets were presented by Yuri Titv, FIG President, Russia.

== Qualification ==
The top 12 teams at the 1995 World Artistic Gymnastics Championships earned places in the team all-around competition.

== Results ==
Rank	Team	Vault			Uneven Bars			Balance Beam			Floor			Total	Rank
Rank	Team	C	O	Rank	C	O	Rank	C	O	Rank	C	O	Rank	Total	Rank
Gold medal	United States	97.209		2	97.809		1	96.410		2	97.797		1	389.225	
Gold medal	Shannon Miller	9.762	9.700	10	9.775	9.787	9	9.737	9.862	1	9.787	9.618	18	78.028	2
Gold medal	Dominique Dawes	9.725	9.762	8	9.762	9.850	5	9.425	9.725	11	9.687	9.850	7	77.786	6
Gold medal	Kerri Strug*	9.812	9.712	5	9.675	9.787	14	9.350	9.737	15	9.825	9.837	1	77.735	7
Gold medal	Dominique Moceanu	9.662	9.200	48	9.725	9.812	11	9.687	9.850	2	9.750	9.837	4	77.523	11
Gold medal	Jaycie Phelps	9.587	9.662	21	9.712	9.787	13	9.012	9.600	38	9.662	9.750	15	76.722	17
Gold medal	Amy Chow	9.700	9.712	11	9.762	9.837	6							39.011	95
Gold medal	Amanda Borden							9.312	9.725	19	9.712	9.762	10	38.511	97
Silver medal	Russia	97.148		3	97.598		2	96.473		1	97.185		3	388.404	
Silver medal	Dina Kochetkova	9.737	9.662	13	9.825	9.800	4	9.675	9.825	3	9.737	9.725	11	77.986	3
Silver medal	Rozalia Galiyeva	9.837	9.675	6	9.750	9.762	12	9.600	9.862	5	9.737	9.500	29	77.723	8
Silver medal	Svetlana Khorkina	9.650	9.700	16	9.812	9.850	2	9.512	9.800	6	9.662	9.662	23	77.648	9
Silver medal	Elena Grosheva	9.800	9.700	7	9.275	9.737	47	9.550	9.437	21	9.750	9.775	8	77.024	14
Silver medal	Elena Dolgopolova	9.650	9.737	14	9.662	9.212	54				9.675	9.750	14	57.686	82
Silver medal	Yevgeniya Kuznetsova	0.000	9.637	93	9.675	9.725	18	9.400	9.712	14				48.149	90
Silver medal	Oksana Lyapina	9.575	0.000	95				9.500	9.225	34	9.625	9.712	21	47.637	92
Bronze medal	Romania	97.485		1	97.535		3	95.886		3	97.340		2	388.246	
Bronze medal	Lavinia Miloșovici	9.837	9.737	3	9.850	9.737	7	9.400	9.825	8	9.643	9.812	12	77.841	4
Bronze medal	Gina Gogean	9.837	9.800	2	9.737	9.625	22	9.437	9.825	7	9.712	9.850	6	77.823	5
Bronze medal	Alexandra Marinescu*	9.675	9.687	15	9.787	9.775	9	9.600	9.600	9	9.650	9.762	15	77.536	10
Bronze medal	Simona Amânar	9.800	9.875	1	9.850	9.825	1	8.687	9.800	45	9.712	9.887	3	77.436	12
Bronze medal	Mirela Țugurlan	9.650	9.587	22	9.687	9.662	23	9.287	9.650	23	9.600	9.712	24	76.835	15
Bronze medal	Ionela Loaieș	9.587	9.512	35	9.537	9.612	36	9.387	9.675	16	9.525	9.662	31	76.497	23
4	China	96.474		4	96.785		5	95.498		5	97.110		4	385.867	
4	Mo Huilan	9.737	9.800	4	9.437	9.800	29	9.650	9.312	22	9.750	9.775	8	77.261	13
4	Mao Yanling	9.387	9.587	43	9.650	9.637	27	9.475	9.675	11	9.600	9.687	26	76.698	18
4	Qiao Ya	9.487	9.625	33	9.650	8.900	65	9.312	9.737	18	9.662	9.462	42	75.835	29
4	Liu Xuan	0.000	9.650	92	9.250	9.737	48	9.550	9.275	28	9.525	9.600	40	66.587	75
4	Ji Liya	9.675	9.725	12	9.687	9.612	26				9.762	9.825	4	58.286	81
4	Kui Yuanyuan	9.525	9.625	29				8.925	9.875	29	9.687	9.762	13	57.399	84
4	Bi Wenjing	9.625	0.000	94	9.750	9.825	8	9.262	9.650	25				48.112	91
5	Ukraine	96.147		6	96.973		4	95.849		4	96.872		5	385.841	
5	Lilia Podkopayeva	9.762	9.525	19	9.837	9.825	2	9.700	9.800	3	9.850	9.762	2	78.061	1
5	Svetlana Zelepukina	9.550	9.612	28	9.650	9.650	25	9.387	9.675	16	9.587	9.587	34	76.698	18
5	Liubov Sheremeta	9.350	9.537	46	9.525	9.712	29	9.312	9.700	20	9.637	9.750	20	76.523	21
5	Anna Mirgorodskaya	9.637	9.587	24	9.400	9.725	38	9.475	9.287	33	9.700	9.712	15	76.523	21
5	Oksana Knizhnik	9.675	9.650	18				9.350	9.587	23	9.687	9.575	28	57.524	83
5	Olena Shaparna	9.525	9.612	31	9.612	9.462	44				9.525	9.600	40	57.336	85
5	Olga Teslenko				9.687	9.750	16	9.475	9.700	10				38.612	96
6	Belarus	96.309		5	95.185		9	94.359		6	95.410		7	381.263	
6	Yelena Piskun	9.700	9.650	16	9.812	9.575	19	9.187	9.587	32	9.700	9.575	27	76.786	16
6	Alena Polozkova	9.637	9.562	26	9.750	9.562	24	9.550	9.587	13	9.637	9.362	47	76.647	20
6	Svetlana Boginskaya	9.737	9.737	9	9.412	9.175	64	9.425	9.425	27	9.737	9.575	24	76.223	25
6	Olga Yurkina	9.325	9.437	55	9.475	9.012	69	9.362	9.362	35	9.375	8.937	81	74.285	47
6	Ludmila Vitiukova	9.612	9.475	36				9.462	9.412	26	9.512	9.612	42	57.085	86
6	Svetlana Tarasevich	9.562	9.637	26	9.662	9.487	36				9.300	9.325	65	56.973	87
6	Tatiana Zharganova				9.675	8.925	62	9.150	8.387	76				36.137	102
7	Spain	94.649		8	95.985		7	92.548		8	94.899		8	378.081	
7	Mónica Martín	9.450	9.600	39	9.650	9.550	34	9.187	9.425	38	9.650	9.550	30	76.062	27
7	Joana Juárez	9.525	9.550	38	9.712	9.512	32	9.350	9.225	41	9.737	9.200	52	75.811	31
7	Mercedes Pacheco	9.300	9.325	69	9.750	9.687	16	9.262	9.375	37	9.462	9.575	45	75.736	34
7	Diana Plaza	9.325	9.337	66	9.587	9.500	43	9.237	9.062	54	9.575	9.150	61	74.773	40
7	Elisabeth Valle	9.587	9.650	22	9.537	9.500	45	8.425	9.212	72	9.500	9.275	57	74.686	42
7	Verónica Castro	9.262	9.287	77	9.487	0.000	90	9.075	9.200	55	9.375	9.375	60	65.061	78
7	Gemma Paz				0.000	9.425	91							9.425	104
8	France	94.060		9	96.072		6	91.536		10	96.047		6	377.715	
8	Isabelle Severino	9.425	9.487	44	9.687	9.700	19	9.037	9.500	44	9.650	9.687	21	76.173	26
8	Elvire Teza	9.362	9.400	55	9.737	9.712	15	8.750	9.662	49	9.587	9.587	34	75.797	33
8	Ludivine Furnon	9.537	9.600	31	9.587	9.525	40	8.750	9.025	69	9.750	9.650	19	75.474	35
8	Emilie Volle	9.287	9.387	65	9.612	9.500	40	9.050	9.550	40	9.412	9.537	50	75.335	36
8	Cécile Canqueteau	9.150	9.425	74	9.187	9.475	59	8.700	9.337	66	9.487	9.700	31	74.461	45
8	Orélie Troscompt	9.125	9.350	79							9.275	9.312	68	37.062	99
8	Laure Gély				9.537	9.275	56	8.550	9.200	71				36.562	100
9	Hungary	95.199		7	95.472		8	91.996		9	94.797		9	377.464	
9	Adrienn Varga	9.612	9.475	36	9.750	9.375	38	9.162	9.412	42	9.525	9.612	38	75.923	28
9	Adrienn Nyeste	9.675	9.475	29	9.537	9.687	32	9.175	9.212	51	9.512	9.537	44	75.810	32
9	Nikolett Krausz	9.525	9.575	34	9.700	9.587	27	9.250	7.362	88	9.587	9.587	34	74.173	48
9	Andrea Molnár	9.425	9.387	51	9.437	9.450	53	8.787	9.237	67	9.000	9.237	84	73.960	52
9	Henrietta Ónodi	9.512	9.525	40	0.000	9.412	92	9.262	9.437	36	9.500	9.462	48	66.110	76
9	Ildikó Balog				9.137	9.525	59	8.812	9.037	68	0.000	9.175	95	45.686	93
9	Eszter Óváry	9.312	9.400	62	9.387	0.000	93				0.000	9.300	94	37.399	98
10	Australia	93.648		11	94.385		10	92.647		7	94.735		10	375.415	
10	Lisa Skinner	9.200	9.400	72	9.550	9.412	50	9.287	9.287	42	9.500	9.450	49	75.086	37
10	Joanna Hughes	9.525	9.500	41	8.962	9.287	76	8.950	9.175	62	9.537	9.600	38	74.536	43
10	Ruth Moniz	8.950	9.325	84	9.487	9.625	40	9.275	9.512	30	9.400	8.925	80	74.499	44
10	Jennyfer Smith	9.362	9.437	53	8.687	9.462	81	9.012	9.187	58	9.212	9.562	59	73.921	53
10	Lisa Moro	0.000	9.300	96	9.675	9.475	35	9.312	9.162	47	9.437	9.587	46	65.948	77
10	Nicole Kantek	9.212	9.412	70	0.000	9.312	95	0.000	9.400	93	9.012	9.450	77	55.798	88
11	Greece	93.897		10	92.966		11	91.285		11	93.123		12	371.291	
11	Vasiliki Tsavdaridou	9.662	9.550	25	9.675	9.700	21	9.375	9.100	46	9.512	9.675	31	76.249	24
11	Virginia Karentzou	9.262	9.375	68	9.262	9.450	58	8.887	9.300	59	8.987	9.500	74	74.023	50
11	Constantina Margariti	9.362	9.212	75	9.475	9.137	61	9.312	8.737	65	9.150	9.625	57	74.010	51
11	Kyriaki Firinidou	9.437	9.337	54	8.725	8.750	87	9.000	9.350	52	8.925	9.575	73	73.099	61
11	Georgia Tempou	8.887	9.300	87	8.775	9.400	79	8.687	8.912	74	8.512	0.000	96	62.473	80
11	Aikaterini Mamouti	9.175	9.437	71	8.050	0.000	98	8.837	0.000	95	8.737	9.425	85	53.661	89
11	Kyriaki Papanikolaou				0.000	9.387	93	0.000	9.212	94	0.000	9.437	93	28.036	103
12	Japan	92.797		12	90.834		12	89.972		12	93.459		11	367.062	
12	Risa Sugawara	9.362	9.375	59	9.512	9.475	48	8.762	9.400	60	9.362	9.512	55	74.760	41
12	Naho Hoshiyama	9.000	9.175	88	9.487	8.825	74	8.912	9.337	57	9.337	9.237	69	73.310	57
12	Miho Hashiguchi	9.287	9.287	75	9.087	9.112	77	9.000	8.475	79	9.425	9.450	54	73.123	60
12	Hanako Miura	9.462	9.400	48	8.512	8.475	89	8.875	8.637	77	9.312	9.412	63	72.085	68
12	Aya Sekine	9.137	9.125	85	0.000	8.762	96	9.012	8.425	80	9.112	9.137	83	62.710	79
12	Masumi Okawa	9.075	9.237	82	8.425	0.000	97				9.275	9.075	79	45.087	94
12	Satsuko Obata				8.825	9.237	82	9.162	9.162	53				36.386	101
	Oksana Chusovitina (UZB)	9.637	9.637	20	9.625	9.612	29	9.300	8.837	61	9.612	9.562	34	75.822	30
	Anastasia Dzyundzyak (UZB)	9.400	9.475	47	9.475	9.425	52	9.025	9.225	56	9.512	9.437	50	74.974	38
	Yvonne Tousek (CAN)	9.250	9.500	58	9.450	9.000	71	9.212	9.575	30	9.600	9.187	56	74.774	39
	Giordana Rocchi (ITA)	9.387	9.450	50	9.175	9.275	71	9.212	9.187	50	9.162	9.525	64	74.373	46
	Francesca Morotti (ITA)	9.225	9.087	82	9.550	9.475	46	9.037	9.087	63	9.237	9.337	69	74.035	49
	Jennifer Exaltacion (CAN)	9.200	9.262	80	9.337	9.187	68	9.237	9.237	47	9.337	8.925	82	73.722	54
	Kathleen Stark (GER)	9.375	9.525	45	9.625	8.900	67	8.887	8.600	78	9.275	9.350	65	73.537	55
	Olga Kozevnikova (KAZ)	9.375	9.337	62	9.562	8.900	70	9.212	8.387	74	9.375	9.350	61	73.498	56
	Ludmila Prince (LAT)	9.475	9.537	42	9.000	9.150	80	8.412	8.700	82	9.362	9.550	53	73.186	58
	Pascale Grossenbacher (SUI)	8.987	9.275	85	9.325	9.275	62	8.637	9.162	70	9.087	9.400	74	73.148	59
	Shanyn MacEachern (CAN)	9.275	9.525	52	9.362	9.462	55	8.087	8.600	87	9.175	9.437	67	72.923	62
	Kong Yoon-Jin (KOR)	9.375	9.337	62	9.168	8.412	86	8.825	9.275	64	9.262	9.250	72	72.904	63
	Annika Reeder (GBR)	9.337	9.325	66	8.818	9.212	83	8.825	8.800	73	9.462	9.000	77	72.779	64
	Ana Destefano (ARG)	9.337	9.387	61	9.462	9.275	57	8.012	8.762	86	9.150	9.387	71	72.772	65
	Diana Teixeira (POR)	9.425	9.337	55	9.112	9.437	66	8.812	8.437	81	9.187	8.862	86	72.609	66
	Gabriela Krčmárová (CZE)	9.325	9.262	73	8.987	8.975	84	8.162	8.912	84	9.050	9.437	74	72.110	67
	Veselina Gentcheva (BUL)	9.275	9.450	60	9.412	9.500	51	8.300	7.400	90	8.718	9.312	87	71.367	69
	Klaudia Kinská (SVK)	9.075	8.987	89	8.850	8.837	85	7.800	9.125	85	8.937	8.937	88	70.548	70
	Sonia Lawrence (GBR)	9.137	9.350	78	9.475	8.812	75	7.375	8.037	91	9.175	8.537	89	69.898	71
	Yvonne Pioch (GER)	8.600	9.325	90	9.275	8.912	78	8.000	8.475	89	8.950	8.150	92	69.687	72
	Eileen Díaz (PUR)	8.700	7.925	91	9.187	9.237	73	8.687	8.412	83	8.400	9.000	90	69.548	73
	Naima El-Rhouati (MAR)	9.087	9.250	81	8.562	8.887	88	6.881	7.800	92	8.612	8.775	91	67.854	74

* Qualified to all-around final, but did not participate.
