= 1995 World Artistic Gymnastics Championships =

Gymnastics competition

- Venue: Sun Dome Fukui
- Location: Sabae, Japan
- Start date: October 1, 1995
- End date: October 10, 1995

The 30th Artistic Gymnastics World Championships were held at Sun Dome Fukui in Sabae, Japan in 1995.

== Results ==
Event	Gold	Silver	Bronze
Men
Team all-around	China; Fan Bin; Huang Huadong; Huang Liping; Li Xiaoshuang; Zhang Jinjing; Shen Jian; Fan Hongbin	Japan; Yoshiaki Hatakeda; Daisuke Nishikawa; Hikaru Tanaka; Toshiharu Sato; Masayuki Matsunaga; Hiromasa Masuda; Masayoshi Maeda	Romania; Dan Burinca; Adrian Ianculescu; Cristian Leric; Nistor Sandro; Nicu Stroia; Marius Urzică; Nicolae Bejenaru
Individual all-around	(China) Li Xiaoshuang	(Belarus) Vitaly Scherbo	(Russia) Evgeny Chabaev
Floor	(Belarus) Vitaly Scherbo	(China) Li Xiaoshuang	(Ukraine) Grigory Misutin
Pommel horse	(Switzerland) Donghua Li	(China) Huang Huadong (Japan) Yoshiaki Hatakeda	none awarded
Rings	(Italy) Yuri Chechi	(Romania) Dan Burinca	(Bulgaria) Yordan Yovchev
Vault	(Russia) Alexei Nemov (Ukraine) Grigory Misutin	none awarded	(Belarus) Vitaly Scherbo
Parallel bars	(Belarus) Vitaly Scherbo	(China) Huang Liping	(Japan) Hikaru Tanaka
Horizontal bar	(Germany) Andreas Wecker	(Japan) Yoshiaki Hatakeda	(Bulgaria) Krasimir Dounev (China) Zhang Jinjing
Women
Team all-around	Romania; Lavinia Miloșovici; Gina Gogean; Simona Amânar; Alexandra Marinescu; Andreea Cacovean; Claudia Presăcan; Nadia Hațegan	China; Mo Huilan; Mao Yanling; Meng Fei; Qiao Ya; Liu Xuan; Ye Linlin; Ji Liya	United States; Shannon Miller; Dominique Moceanu; Kerri Strug; Donielle Thompson; Jaycie Phelps; Mary Beth Arnold; Teresa Kulikowski
Individual all-around	(Ukraine) Lilia Podkopayeva	(Russia) Svetlana Khorkina	(Romania) Lavinia Miloșovici
Vault	(Romania) Simona Amânar (Ukraine) Lilia Podkopayeva	none awarded	(Romania) Gina Gogean
Uneven bars	(Russia) Svetlana Khorkina	(China) Mo Huilan (Ukraine) Lilia Podkopayeva	none awarded
Balance beam	(China) Mo Huilan	(United States) Dominique Moceanu (Ukraine) Lilia Podkopayeva	none awarded
Floor	(Romania) Gina Gogean	(China) Ji Liya	(France) Ludivine Furnon

== Medal table ==
=== Overall ===
Rank	Nation	Gold	Silver	Bronze	Total
1	China (CHN)	3	6	1	10
2	Ukraine (UKR)	3	2	1	6
3	Romania (ROU)	3	1	3	7
4	Belarus (BLR)	2	1	1	4
4	Russia (RUS)	2	1	1	4
6	Germany (GER)	1	0	0	1
6	Italy (ITA)	1	0	0	1
6	Switzerland (SUI)	1	0	0	1
9	Japan (JPN)	0	3	1	4
10	United States (USA)	0	1	1	2
11	Bulgaria (BUL)	0	0	2	2
12	France (FRA)	0	0	1	1
Totals (12 entries)		16	15	12	43

=== Men ===
Rank	Nation	Gold	Silver	Bronze	Total
1	China	2	3	1	6
2	Belarus	2	1	1	4
3	Russia	1	0	1	2
3	Ukraine	1	0	1	2
5	Germany	1	0	0	1
5	Italy	1	0	0	1
5	Switzerland	1	0	0	1
8	Japan	0	3	1	4
9	Romania	0	1	1	2
10	Bulgaria	0	0	2	2
Totals (10 entries)		9	8	8	25

=== Women ===
Rank	Nation	Gold	Silver	Bronze	Total
1	Romania	3	0	2	5
2	Ukraine	2	2	0	4
3	China	1	3	0	4
4	Russia	1	1	0	2
5	United States	0	1	1	2
6	France	0	0	1	1
Totals (6 entries)		7	7	4	18

== Participants ==
=== Women ===
Country	Gymnast
Argentina	Simone Aldana
Argentina	Laura Álvarez
Argentina	Ariadna Argoitia
Argentina	Ana Destéfano
Argentina	Analia Rodríguez
Australia	Kirsty-Leigh Brown
Australia	Joanna Hughes
Australia	Nicole Kantek
Australia	Ruth Moniz
Australia	Lisa Moro
Australia	Genevieve Preston
Australia	Lisa Skinner
Austria	Ruscha Kouril
Belarus	Svetlana Boginskaya
Belarus	Elena Piskun
Belarus	Yulia Sobko
Belarus	Svetlana Tarasevich
Belarus	Lyudmila Vityukova
Belarus	Olga Yurkina
Belarus	Tatiana Zharganova
Belgium	Monique Cohnen
Belgium	Caroline Debras
Belgium	Lies Deramoudt
Belgium	Jessica Peeters
Belgium	Elke Riskin
Belgium	Melanie Robertz
Belgium	Vanessa Vandeplas
Brazil	Soraya Carvalho
Brazil	Beatriz Degani
Brazil	Mariana Gonçalves
Brazil	Leticia Ishii
Brazil	Liliane Koreyasu
Brazil	Beatrice Martins
Brazil	Melissa Sugimote
Bulgaria	Veselina Gencheva
Bulgaria	Elena Ivanova
Bulgaria	Galina Lazarova
Bulgaria	Iglika Panayotova
Bulgaria	Maria Paperova
Bulgaria	Mirela Peneva
Canada	Stephanie Cappuccitti
Canada	Marilou Cousineau
Canada	Lena Degteva
Canada	Jennifer Exaltacion
Canada	Shanyn MacEachern
Canada	Yvonne Tousek
Canada	Theresa Wolf
China	Ji Liya
China	Liu Xuan
China	Mao Yanling
China	Meng Fei
China	Mo Huilan
China	Qiao Ya
China	Ye Linlin
Czech Republic	Kateřina Bínová
Czech Republic	Martina Bínová
Czech Republic	Kateřina Fialová
Czech Republic	Pavla Kinclová
Czech Republic	Gabriela Krčmářová
Czech Republic	Milana Novotná
Czech Republic	Klára Slavíková
Denmark	Charlotte Andreasen
France	Laetitia Bégué
France	Cécile Canqueteau
France	Ludivine Furnon
France	Laure Gély
France	Isabelle Severino
France	Elvire Teza
France	Orélie Troscompt
Germany	Kim Bühlow
Germany	Cindy Klemrath
Germany	Rufina Kreibich
Germany	Katrin Kühnert
Germany	Yvonne Pioch
Germany	Kathleen Stark
Germany	Nadja Ziehfreund
Greece	Lambrini Apostolidou
Greece	Kyriaki Firinidou
Greece	Virginia Karentzou
Greece	Aikaterini Mamouti
Greece	Kyriaki Papanikolaou
Greece	Georgia Tempou
Greece	Vasiliki Tsavdaridou
Guatemala	Rocío Salazar
Hungary	Ildikó Balog
Hungary	Ildikó Dragoner
Hungary	Erika Gibala
Hungary	Nikolett Krausz
Hungary	Adrienn Nyeste
Hungary	Eszter Óváry
Hungary	Adrienn Varga
Israel	Yael Bar
Israel	Einat Kedar
Israel	Adi Peer
Israel	Ester Remo
Israel	Maya Shani
Israel	Ortal Targash
Israel	Hadar Varshaviak
Italy	Chiara Ferrazzi
Italy	Elisa Lamperti
Italy	Laura Montagnolo
Italy	Francesca Morotti
Italy	Clara Pedrini
Italy	Tania Rebagliati
Italy	Giordana Rocchi
Japan	Miho Hashiguchi
Japan	Naho Hoshiyama
Japan	Kaori Iwata
Japan	Mari Kosuge
Japan	Hanako Miura
Japan	Masumi Okawa
Japan	Risa Sugawara
Kazakhstan	Saltanat Aleeva
Kazakhstan	Alja Khoudaibergenova
Kazakhstan	Olga Kozhevnikova
Kazakhstan	Olga Sokomnina
Kazakhstan	Oksana Yemelyanova
Kazakhstan	Irina Yevdokimova
Latvia	Yulia Feofilova
Latvia	Ludmila Prince
Mexico	Mariana Cabello
Mexico	Judith Cavazos
Mexico	Denisse López
Mexico	Brenda Magaña
Mexico	Stephanie Martínez
Mexico	Laura Moreno
Mexico	Perta Ramírez
Morocco	Naima El-Rhouati
Norway	Anita Tomulevski
Poland	Agnieszka Supińska
Portugal	Sara Nabais
Portugal	Diana Teixeira
Puerto Rico	Eileen Díaz
Puerto Rico	Yariza Yulian
Romania	Simona Amânar
Romania	Andreea Cacovean
Romania	Gina Gogean
Romania	Nadia Hațegan
Romania	Alexandra Marinescu
Romania	Lavinia Miloșovici
Romania	Claudia Presăcan
Russia	Natalia Bobrova
Russia	Elena Dolgopolova
Russia	Elena Grosheva
Russia	Evgeniya Kuznetsova
Russia	Svetlana Khorkina
Russia	Dina Kochetkova
Russia	Elena Produnova
Slovakia	Klaudia Kinská
Slovakia	Martina Kucharčíková
Slovakia	Silvia Vlčková
South Africa	Heidi Oosthuizen
South Africa	Ilse Roets
South Africa	Tanya Steenkamp
South Korea	Ji Hae-sung
South Korea	Kim Joo-ran
South Korea	Park Joo-young
South Korea	Choi Mi-seon
South Korea	Han Na-jung
South Korea	Heo So-young
South Korea	Kong Yoon-jin
Spain	Verónica Castro
Spain	Joana Juárez
Spain	Mónica Martín
Spain	Mercedes Pacheco
Spain	Gemma Paz
Spain	Diana Plaza
Switzerland	Pascale Grossenbacher
Switzerland	Natascha Schnell
Thailand	Lanna Apisukh
Ukraine	Irina Bulakhova
Ukraine	Viktoria Karpenko
Ukraine	Oksana Knizhnik
Ukraine	Anna Mirgorodskaya
Ukraine	Lilia Podkopayeva
Ukraine	Olena Shaparna
United Kingdom	Gemma Cuff
United Kingdom	Gabriela Fuchs
United Kingdom	Michaela Knox
United Kingdom	Sonia Lawrence
United Kingdom	Zita Lusack
United Kingdom	Annika Reeder
United Kingdom	Karin Szymko
United States	Mary Beth Arnold
United States	Theresa Kulikowski
United States	Shannon Miller
United States	Dominique Moceanu
United States	Jaycie Phelps
United States	Kerri Strug
United States	Doni Thompson
Uzbekistan	Saida Boboeva
Uzbekistan	Botagos Boyatanova
Uzbekistan	Oksana Chusovitina
Uzbekistan	Natalia Dyonushrina
Uzbekistan	Anastasia Dzyundzyak
Uzbekistan	Aleksandra Gordeeva

== Men's results ==
=== Team final ===
NB: Team rosters are incomplete.

Rank	Team	Floor		Pommel Horse		Rings		Vault		Parallel Bars		Horizontal Bar		Total	Rank
Rank	Team	C	O	C	O	C	O	C	O	C	O	C	O	Total	Rank
Gold medal	CHN	93.350		94.974		93.574		94.037		95.374		95.310		566.619	
Gold medal	Li Xiaoshuang	9.375	9.650	9.425	9.587	9.500	9.625	9.575	9.725	9.600	9.600	9.512	9.612	114.786	1
Gold medal	Zhang Jinjing	9.200	9.225	9.275	9.450	9.325	9.325	9.350	9.450	9.425	9.475	9.662	9.587	112.749	10
Gold medal	Huang Liping	9.300		9.500	9.400	9.350	9.050	9.250	9.425	9.662	9.737	8.900	9.687	103.261	98
Gold medal	Fan Bin		9.175	9.425	9.787	9.250	9.050	9.350	9.025	9.475	9.425	9.575	9.525	103.062	99
Gold medal	Shen Jian	9.300	9.150	9.350	8.900	9.200	9.325		9.075	9.300	9.650	9.300	9.175	101.725	102
Gold medal	Huang Huadong	9.350	9.100	9.400	9.650			9.275		9.050	9.450	9.350	9.500	84.125	161
Gold medal	Fan Hongbin	9.250	9.575			9.287	9.537		9.562					47.211	202
Silver medal	JPN	93.087		93.937		93.737		93.650		94.374		94.773		563.558	
Silver medal	Hikaru Tanaka	9.450	9.275	9.475	9.600	9.375	9.550	9.600	9.300	9.175	9.787	9.725	9.425	113.737	2
Silver medal	Yoshiaki Hatakeda	9.425	9.025	9.325	9.712	9.275	9.300	9.300	9.150	9.525	9.600	9.662	9.587	112.886	6
Silver medal	Daisuke Nishikawa	9.487	9.250	9.275	9.475	9.425	9.200	9.425	9.400	9.462	9.425	9.587	9.350	112.761	9
Silver medal	Toshiharu Sato	9.350	9.100	9.225	9.350	9.350	9.275	9.475	8.925	9.275	9.375	9.450	8.300	110.450	34
Silver medal	Masayuki Matsunaga	9.300	9.350	6.700		9.200	9.425	9.325	9.150	9.275	9.425	9.025	9.350	99.525	118
Silver medal	Hiromasa Masuda	9.375	8.750		9.075	9.250	9.512	9.400	9.425					64.787	191
Silver medal	Masayoshi Maeda			9.175	9.325					8.750	9.425	9.462	9.175	55.312	198
Bronze medal	ROU	93.837		94.162		92.737		93.775		92.825		94.611		561.947	
Bronze medal	Nistor Șandro	9.450	9.225	9.250	9.275	9.425	9.325	9.300	9.225	9.300	9.250	9.612	9.600	112.237	15
Bronze medal	Cristian Leric	9.250	9.562	9.175	9.550	9.075	9.200	9.650	9.600	9.050	9.525	8.975	9.375	111.987	20
Bronze medal	Adrian Ianculescu	9.400	9.475	9.275	9.675	9.075	8.975	9.500	9.500	9.150	9.175	9.450	9.325	111.975	21
Bronze medal	Nicu Stroia	9.300	9.300	9.250	9.487	9.200	9.325	9.375	9.200	8.925	9.300	9.587	9.537	111.786	22
Bronze medal	Marius Urzică		9.425	9.525	9.700			9.250	9.150	9.200	9.350	9.225	9.350	84.175	160
Bronze medal	Nicolae Bejenaru	9.325	9.300	9.025	9.175	9.025	9.025	9.250	9.175		9.300			82.600	168
Bronze medal	Dan Burincă	9.300				9.250	9.737			9.400		9.550	9.275	56.612	197
4	RUS	94.149		93.500		92.612		94.836		93.862		92.012		560.971	
4	Dimitri Karbanenko	9.225	9.562	9.175	9.175	9.050	9.250	9.562	9.437	9.300	9.300	9.550	9.650	112.236	16
4	Yevgeny Shabayev	9.250	9.475	9.250	9.650	8.875	9.250	9.525	9.325	9.250	9.637	8.775	8.725	110.987	29
4	Aleksey Voropayev	9.275	9.525	8.975	9.450	9.200	9.562	9.476	9.562	9.175	9.475	8.125	8.925	110.724	32
4	Alexei Nemov	9.375	9.550	8.425	9.750	9.100	9.350	9.325	9.725	9.050	9.725	6.525	9.737	109.637	39
4	Dmitri Vasilenko	9.200	9.462	8.950	9.350	9.250	9.350	9.350	9.350	9.050			9.075	92.387	137
4	Yevgeni Podgorny	9.275	9.637			9.250	9.200	9.450	9.400		9.200	9.425	9.450	84.287	159
5	align=leftUKR	93.424		92.350		93.137		93.900		94.062		94.097		560.934	
5	Rustam Sharipov	9.400	8.825	9.200	9.525	9.250	9.375	9.400	9.025	9.450	9.750	9.612	9.562	112.374	12
5	Volodymyr Shamenko	9.200	9.350	8.975	9.075	9.300	9.450	9.375	9.150	9.300	9.450	9.475	9.325	111.425	24
5	Oleksandr Svitlychniy	9.175	9.300	7.175	9.375	9.275	9.350	9.275	9.300	9.000	9.450	9.350	9.437	109.462	41
5	Yuriy Yermakov	9.375		9.175	9.200	9.200		9.350	8.950	9.225	9.325	9.275	9.225	92.300	138
5	Ihor Korobchynskyi	9.325	9.000	9.225		9.050		9.650		9.350	9.687	8.150	9.475	82.912	167
5	Hrihoriy Misyutin	9.512	9.687		9.325	9.175	9.562	9.575	9.675		9.400			75.911	177
5	Oleg Kosyak		9.275	8.975	9.375		9.200		9.400	9.000		9.325	8.550	73.100	183

=== All-around ===
Rank	Gymnast	Floor (gymnastics)	Pommel horse	Rings (gymnastics)	Vault (gymnastics)	Parallel bars	Horizontal bar	Total
1st place, gold medalist(s)	Li Xiaoshuang (CHN)	9.612	9.700	9.662	9.675	9.712	9.637	57.998
2nd place, silver medalist(s)	Vitaly Scherbo (BLR)	9.650	9.500	9.375	9.562	9.700	9.712	57.499
3rd place, bronze medalist(s)	Yevgeny Shabayev (RUS)	9.562	9.600	9.437	9.425	9.587	9.637	57.248
4	Aleksey Voropayev (RUS)	9.487	9.425	9.625	9.625	9.550	9.500	57.212
5	Valery Belenky (GER)	9.487	9.612	9.587	9.562	9.600	9.350	57.198
6	Yoshiaki Hatakeda (JPN)	9.537	9.675	9.375	9.100	9.662	9.650	56.999
7	Jury Chechi (ITA)	9.250	9.450	9.837	9.100	9.587	9.637	56.861
8	Zhang Jinjing (CHN)	9.425	9.125	9.425	9.587	9.650	9.587	56.799
9	Han Yoon-Soo (KOR)	9.125	9.612	9.425	9.325	9.625	9.650	56.762
10	Andreas Wecker (GER)	9.150	9.450	9.675	9.225	9.450	9.662	56.612
11	Cristian Leric (ROU)	9.500	9.512	9.250	9.425	9.300	9.575	56.562
12	Oleksandr Svitlychniy (UKR)	9.537	9.537	9.300	9.350	9.350	9.462	56.536
13	Hikaru Tanaka (JPN)	9.000	9.300	9.600	9.375	9.650	9.600	56.525
14	Daisuke Nishikawa (JPN)	9.475	9.275	9.400	9.400	9.375	9.450	56.375
15	Patrice Casimir (FRA)	9.000	9.662	9.300	9.425	9.475	9.475	56.337
16	Zoltán Supola (HUN)	9.175	9.587	9.325	9.225	9.425	9.587	56.324
17	Rustam Sharipov (UKR)	9.225	9.425	9.537	9.300	9.700	9.125	56.312
18	Ivan Ivankov (BLR)	9.250	9.625	9.475	9.425	9.575	8.950	56.300
19	Volodymyr Shamenko (UKR)	9.525	9.325	9.350	9.350	9.437	9.175	56.162
20	Vitaly Rudnitsky (BLR)	9.525	9.625	9.500	9.300	9.175	9.025	56.150
21	Yordan Yovchev (BUL)	9.487	9.350	9.675	9.000	9.475	9.125	56.112
22	Boris Preti (ITA)	9.100	9.200	9.425	9.200	9.487	9.612	56.024
23	Dimitri Karbanenko (RUS)	9.337	8.900	9.300	9.050	9.662	9.600	55.849
24	Jesús Carballo (ESP)	9.275	9.200	9.300	9.100	9.325	9.600	55.800
25	Blaine Wilson (USA)	9.350	9.350	9.575	9.375	8.725	9.375	55.750
26	Krasimir Dunev (BUL)	9.025	9.225	9.050	9.462	9.375	9.600	55.737
27	Andrei Kravtsov (AUS)	9.100	9.375	9.275	9.175	9.325	9.350	55.600
28	Jung Jin-Soo (KOR)	9.250	8.625	9.425	9.150	9.537	9.425	55.412
29	Sergey Fedorchenko (KAZ)	9.512	9.537	9.300	9.350	9.200	8.450	55.349
30	John Roethlisberger (USA)	8.825	9.425	9.425	9.150	9.375	9.100	55.300
31	Jair Lynch (USA)	9.050	9.500	9.125	9.150	8.900	9.537	55.262
32	Szilveszter Csollány (HUN)	8.925	9.375	9.575	8.725	8.825	9.300	54.725
33	Dimitar Lunchev (BUL)	8.750	9.200	9.125	9.100	9.487	8.350	54.012
34	Nistor Șandro (ROU)	9.050	8.825	9.400	9.200	8.775	8.725	53.975
35	Donghua Li (SUI)	9.000	9.650	9.050	8.850	9.000	8.375	53.925
36	Adrian Ianculescu (ROU)	8.525	8.750	8.025	8.675	8.600	8.325	50.900

=== Floor exercise ===
Rank	Gymnast	Total
1st place, gold medalist(s)	Vitaly Scherbo (BLR)	9.812
2nd place, silver medalist(s)	Li Xiaoshuang (CHN)	9.775
3rd place, bronze medalist(s)	Hrihoriy Misyutin (UKR)	9.762
4	Ivan Ivankov (BLR)	9.662
5	Ivan Ivanov (BUL)	9.625
5	Yordan Yovchev (BUL)	9.575
7	Alexei Nemov (RUS)	9.500
8	Yevgeni Podgorny (RUS)	9.400

=== Pommel horse ===
Rank	Gymnast	Total
1st place, gold medalist(s)	Donghua Li (SUI)	9.762
2nd place, silver medalist(s)	Huang Huadong (CHN)	9.737
2nd place, silver medalist(s)	Yoshiaki Hatakeda (JPN)	9.737
4	Marius Urzică (ROU)	9.725
5	Hikaru Tanaka (JPN)	9.650
5	Mihai Bagiu (USA)	9.650
7	Éric Poujade (FRA)	9.575
8	Fan Bin (CHN)	9.125

=== Still rings ===
Rank	Gymnast	Total
1st place, gold medalist(s)	Jury Chechi (ITA)	9.850
2nd place, silver medalist(s)	Dan Burincă (ROU)	9.762
3rd place, bronze medalist(s)	Yordan Yovchev (BUL)	9.750
4	Marius Tobă (GER)	9.700
5	Andreas Wecker (GER)	9.687
6	Li Xiaoshuang (CHN)	9.650
7	Hikaru Tanaka (JPN)	9.562
8	John Roethlisberger (USA)	9.550

=== Vault ===
Rank	Gymnast	Total
1st place, gold medalist(s)	Hrihoriy Misyutin (UKR)	9.756
1st place, gold medalist(s)	Alexei Nemov (RUS)	9.756
3rd place, bronze medalist(s)	Vitaly Scherbo (BLR)	9.662
4	Aleksey Voropayev (RUS)	9.637
5	Cristian Leric (ROU)	9.606
6	Yeo Hong-Chul (KOR)	9.550
7	Li Xiaoshuang (CHN)	9.412
8	Adrian Ianculescu (ROU)	9.312

=== Parallel bars ===
Rank	Gymnast	Total
1st place, gold medalist(s)	Vitaly Scherbo (BLR)	9.812
2nd place, silver medalist(s)	Huang Liping (CHN)	9.750
3rd place, bronze medalist(s)	Hikaru Tanaka (JPN)	9.725
4	Rustam Sharipov (UKR)	9.700
5	Ivan Ivankov (BLR)	9.687
6	Li Xiaoshuang (CHN)	9.675
7	Yoshiaki Hatakeda (JPN)	9.600
8	Jung Jin-Soo (KOR)	7.850

=== Horizontal bar ===
Rank	Gymnast	Total
1st place, gold medalist(s)	Andreas Wecker (GER)	9.812
2nd place, silver medalist(s)	Yoshiaki Hatakeda (JPN)	9.775
3rd place, bronze medalist(s)	Krasimir Dunev (BUL)	9.750
3rd place, bronze medalist(s)	Zhang Jinjing (CHN)	9.750
5	Vitaly Scherbo (BLR)	9.725
6	Nistor Șandro (ROU)	9.687
7	Boris Preti (ITA)	9.650
8	Dimitri Karbanenko (RUS)	8.925

== Women's results ==
=== Team final ===
Rank	Team	Vault (gymnastics)		Uneven bars		Balance beam		Floor (gymnastics)		Total	Rank
Rank	Team	C	O	C	O	C	O	C	O	Total	Rank
1st place, gold medalist(s)	Romania	96.522		97.222		96.023		98.098		387.865	
1st place, gold medalist(s)	Lavinia Miloșovici	9.700	9.637	9.675	9.862	9.475	9.775	9.800	9.862	77.786	4
1st place, gold medalist(s)	Gina Gogean	9.825	9.725	9.562	9.875	9.537	9.400	9.875	9.900	77.699	5
1st place, gold medalist(s)	Simona Amânar	9.737	9.887	9.537	9.725	9.237	9.775	9.787	9.912	77.597	7
1st place, gold medalist(s)	Alexandra Marinescu	9.412	9.537	9.662	9.812	9.575	9.837	9.725	9.725	77.285	9
1st place, gold medalist(s)	Andreea Cacovean	9.525	9.537	9.612	9.800	9.400	9.862	9.762	9.700	77.198	11
1st place, gold medalist(s)	Claudia Presăcan	9.337	9.537	9.437		9.387	9.275	9.625	9.750	66.348	119
1st place, gold medalist(s)	Nadia Hațegan				9.825					9.825	195
2nd place, silver medalist(s)	China	95.696		96.696		97.098		97.010		386.476	
2nd place, silver medalist(s)	Mo Huilan	9.475	9.937	9.700	9.862	9.800	9.900	9.712	9.800	78.186	1
2nd place, silver medalist(s)	Mao Yanling	9.212	9.700	8.500	9.762	9.400	9.550	9.712	9.562	76.048	20
2nd place, silver medalist(s)	Meng Fei	9.437	9.775	9.125	9.825	9.025	9.575	9.487	9.675	75.924	22
2nd place, silver medalist(s)	Qiao Ya	9.125		9.487	9.762	9.650	9.762	9.562	9.625	66.973	115
2nd place, silver medalist(s)	Liu Xuan		9.787	9.587	9.812	9.425	9.850		9.687	58.148	153
2nd place, silver medalist(s)	Ye Linlin	9.287	9.712		9.675	9.762	9.087	9.537		57.060	154
2nd place, silver medalist(s)	Ji Liya	9.262	9.812	9.750				9.712	9.825	48.361	170
3rd place, bronze medalist(s)	United States	95.435		96.987		95.948		96.335		384.705	
3rd place, bronze medalist(s)	Shannon Miller	9.550	9.712	9.687	9.725	9.675	9.837	9.787	9.725	77.698	6
3rd place, bronze medalist(s)	Dominique Moceanu	9.625	9.612	9.437	9.700	9.737	9.812	9.737	9.775	77.435	8
3rd place, bronze medalist(s)	Kerri Strug	9.575	9.712	9.625	9.725	9.200	9.750	9.612	9.775	76.974	12
3rd place, bronze medalist(s)	Doni Thompson		9.487	9.650	9.700	9.525	9.662	9.475	9.600	67.099	113
3rd place, bronze medalist(s)	Jaycie Phelps	9.475	9.462	9.800	9.675	9.475	9.262	9.587		66.736	116
3rd place, bronze medalist(s)	Mary Beth Arnold	9.225	9.325	9.700	9.675		9.275		9.037	56.237	158
3rd place, bronze medalist(s)	Theresa Kulikowski	9.212				8.987		9.462	9.262	36.923	183
4	Russia	95.773		97.085		95.659		96.172		384.689	
4	Dina Kochetkova	9.700	9.575	9.675	9.850	9.687	9.837	9.700	9.787	77.811	3
4	Svetlana Khorkina	9.537	9.775	9.725	9.912	9.300	9.800	9.750	9.425	77.224	10
4	Elena Grosheva	9.675	9.712	9.575	9.787	9.575	9.737	9.612	9.125	76.798	13
4	Yevgeniya Kuznetsova	9.250	9.562	8.950	9.762	9.462	9.275	9.437	9.662	75.360	29
4	Natalia Bobrova	9.262	9.525	9.500	9.687	9.537	9.412			56.923	155
4	Elena Dolgopolova	9.450	9.325	9.612	9.575			9.512	9.362	56.836	156
4	Elena Produnova					9.125	9.312	9.562	9.800	37.799	179
5	Ukraine	94.710		97.085		95.586		96.836		382.004	
5	Lilia Podkopayeva	9.612	9.762	9.650	9.875	9.450	9.875	9.850	9.825	77.899	2
5	Irina Bulakhova	9.375	9.575	9.325	9.800	9.200	9.487	9.650	9.687	76.099	19
5	Anna Mirgorodskaya	9.350	9.300	9.412	9.700	9.187	9.650	9.600	9.612	75.811	23
5	Olena Shaparna	9.487	9.300	9.325	9.600		9.437	9.500	9.675	66.324	121
5	Oksana Knizhnik	9.437	9.512		7.825	8.387	9.787	9.712	9.725	64.385	130
5	Svetlana Zelepukina	9.187		9.375		9.337		9.475		37.374	
5	Viktoria Karpenko		7.825	9.362	9.787	9.462				36.436	185
6	France	93.059		94.811		94.298		96.035		378.203	
6	Laetitia Bégué	9.362	9.325	9.400	9.700	9.525	9.700	9.700	9.587	76.299	16
6	Isabelle Severino	9.300	9.412	9.350	9.762	9.037	9.562	9.637	9.625	75.685	25
6	Elvire Teza	9.175	9.362	9.450	9.825	9.337	9.700	9.587	9.212	75.648	26
6	Ludivine Furnon	9.362	8.800	9.125	9.425	9.300	9.325	9.750	9.762	74.849	32
6	Cecile Canqueteau	8.675	9.262	9.162	9.587	9.387	9.375	9.350	9.575	74.373	39
6	Orélie Troscompt	9.162	9.337					9.325	9.462	37.374	180
6	Laure Gély			9.150	9.112	8.225	9.375			36.436	186

=== All-around ===
Rank	Gymnast	Vault (gymnastics)	Uneven bars	Balance beam	Floor (gymnastics)	Total
1st place, gold medalist(s)	Lilia Podkopayeva (UKR)	9.799	9.812	9.787	9.850	39.248
2nd place, silver medalist(s)	Svetlana Khorkina (RUS)	9.756	9.912	9.775	9.687	39.130
3rd place, bronze medalist(s)	Lavinia Miloșovici (ROU)	9.662	9.862	9.737	9.825	39.086
4	Simona Amânar (ROU)	9.862	9.775	9.637	9.775	39.049
5	Dominique Moceanu (USA)	9.737	9.800	9.637	9.712	38.886
6	Mo Huilan (CHN)	9.818	9.862	9.312	9.762	38.754
7	Kerri Strug (USA)	9.600	9.762	9.612	9.775	38.749
8	Dina Kotchetkova (RUS)	9.449	9.775	9.750	9.712	38.686
9	Mao Yanling (CHN)	9.306	9.787	9.812	9.725	38.630
10	Elena Piskun (BLR)	9.656	9.825	9.262	9.787	38.530
11	Irina Bulakhova (UKR)	9.475	9.800	9.625	9.562	38.462
12	Shannon Miller (USA)	9.712	9.362	9.687	9.625	38.386
13	Laetitia Bégué (FRA)	9.362	9.700	9.587	9.662	38.311
14	Gina Gogean (ROU)	9.706	9.037	9.700	9.837	38.280
15	Vasiliki Tsavdaridou (GRE)	9.393	9.725	9.612	9.537	38.267
16	Svetlana Boginskaya (BLR)	9.475	9.787	9.387	9.612	38.261
17	Joana Juárez (ESP)	9.368	9.737	9.337	9.775	38.217
18	Elvire Teza (FRA)	9.150	9.800	9.687	9.562	38.199
19	Oksana Chusovitina (UZB)	9.381	9.662	9.325	9.812	38.180
20	Mercedes Pacheco (ESP)	9.343	9.775	9.387	9.662	38.167
21	Elena Grosheva (RUS)	9.593	9.775	8.875	9.712	37.955
22	Mónica Martín (ESP)	9.418	9.637	9.125	9.687	37.867
23	Adrienn Nyeste (HUN)	9.531	9.600	9.112	9.612	37.855
24	Anna Mirgorodskaya (UKR)	9.362	9.712	9.650	9.075	37.799
25	Nikolett Krausz (HUN)	9.293	9.387	9.350	9.675	37.705
26	Olga Yurkina (BLR)	8.918	9.687	9.550	9.512	37.667
27	Meng Fei (CHN)	9.618	9.087	9.675	9.187	37.567
28	Risa Sugawara (JPN)	9.324	9.487	9.012	9.612	37.435
29	Isabelle Severino (FRA)	9.306	9.225	9.287	9.387	37.205
30	Kyriaki Firinidou (GRE)	9.250	9.025	9.300	9.525	37.100
31	Miho Hashiguchi (JPN)	9.287	9.175	9.237	9.387	37.086
32	Joanna Hughes (AUS)	9.318	8.937	9.237	9.462	36.954
33	Yvonne Pioch (GER)	9.181	9.300	8.962	9.325	36.768
34	Virginia Karentzou (GRE)	9.031	9.037	9.187	9.450	36.705
35	Soraya Carvalho (BRA)	8.968	9.037	9.112	9.175	36.292
36	Irina Yevdokimova (KAZ)	9.143	9.475	7.800	8.750	35.168

=== Vault ===
Rank	Gymnast	Total
1st place, gold medalist(s)	Simona Amânar (ROU)	9.781
1st place, gold medalist(s)	Lilia Podkopayeva (UKR)	9.781
3rd place, bronze medalist(s)	Gina Gogean (ROU)	9.706
4	Mo Huilan (CHN)	9.643
5	Svetlana Khorkina (RUS)	9.618
6	Oksana Chusovitina (UZB)	9.612
7	Elena Grosheva (RUS)	9.293
8	Meng Fei (CHN)	4.831

=== Uneven bars ===
Rank	Gymnast	Total
1st place, gold medalist(s)	Svetlana Khorkina (RUS)	9.900
2nd place, silver medalist(s)	Mo Huilan (CHN)	9.837
2nd place, silver medalist(s)	Lilia Podkopayeva (UKR)	9.837
4	Alexandra Marinescu (ROU)	9.800
5	Lavinia Miloșovici (ROU)	9.775
6	Dina Kochetkova (RUS)	9.737
7	Shannon Miller (USA)	9.712
8	Jaycie Phelps (USA)	9.687

=== Balance beam ===
Rank	Gymnast	Total
1st place, gold medalist(s)	Mo Huilan (CHN)	9.900
2nd place, silver medalist(s)	Dominique Moceanu (USA)	9.837
2nd place, silver medalist(s)	Lilia Podkopayeva (UKR)	9.837
4	Alexandra Marinescu (ROU)	9.737
4	Shannon Miller (USA)	9.737
6	Dina Kochetkova (RUS)	9.725
7	Qiao Ya (CHN)	9.625
8	Elena Grosheva (RUS)	9.562

=== Floor exercise ===
Rank	Gymnast	Total
1st place, gold medalist(s)	Gina Gogean (ROU)	9.825
2nd place, silver medalist(s)	Ji Liya (CHN)	9.675
3rd place, bronze medalist(s)	Ludivine Furnon (FRA)	9.625
4	Mo Huilan (CHN)	9.600
5	Joana Juárez (ESP)	9.462
6	Simona Amânar (ROU)	9.437
7	Lilia Podkopayeva (UKR)	9.087
7	Dominique Moceanu (USA)	9.087

NB: At this competition, tiebreakers were not used. When two gymnasts received the same score in event finals, they both received a medal.
