= 1994 World Artistic Gymnastics Championships – Women's Preliminary =

== Team ==
Rank	Team	Vault (gymnastics)		Uneven bars		Balance beam		Floor (gymnastics)		Total
Rank	Team	C	O	C	O	C	O	C	O	Total
1	Romania	97.511		96.360		96.485		96.522		386.878
1	Lavinia Miloșovici	9.800	9.875	9.812	9.800	9.662	9.837	9.675	9.700	78.161
1	Daniela Mărănducă	9.600	9.750	9.337	9.550	9.587	9.200	9.487	9.650	76.161
1	Gina Gogean	9.800	9.887	9.612	9.700	9.662	7.062	9.750	9.737	75.210
1	Simona Amânar	9.712	9.812	9.400	9.637		9.700	9.512	9.712	67.485
1	Claudia Presăcan	9.550	9.625			9.462	9.737	9.612	9.575	57.561
1	Ionela Loaieș	9.537		9.500	9.587	9.550		9.437	9.687	57.298
1	Nadia Hațegan		9.725	9.762	9.387	9.675	9.825			48.374
2	United States	96.635		95.998		96.285		96.659		385.577
2	Dominique Dawes	9.600	9.775	9.725	9.812	9.700	9.587	9.662	9.812	77.673
2	Kerri Strug	9.737	9.725	9.487	9.537	9.525	9.725	9.737	9.337	76.810
2	Amy Chow	9.575	9.200	9.300	8.912	8.800	8.300	9.425	9.487	72.999
2	Amanda Borden		9.637	9.712	9.675	9.537	9.512	9.800	9.500	67.373
2	Jaycie Phelps	9.437	9.625		9.600	9.600	9.750	9.537	9.650	67.199
2	Larissa Fontaine	9.537	9.712	7.475	9.625		9.462		9.687	55.498
2	Shannon Miller	9.712		9.525		9.887		9.787		38.911
3	China	96.682		95.986		96.584		96.273		385.527
3	Mo Huilan	9.712	9.762	9.750	9.912	9.887	9.350	9.637	9.762	77.772
3	Qiao Ya	9.562	9.625	9.125	9.637	9.812	9.787	9.575	9.550	76.673
3	Ye Linlin	9.625	9.837	9.575		9.775	9.312	9.700	9.675	67.499
3	Yuan Kexia	9.575	9.662		9.725	9.825	9.662	9.625	8.662	66.736
3	Liu Xuan			9.587	9.825	9.687	9.412	9.475	9.637	57.623
3	He Xuemei	9.525	9.712	9.075	9.637	9.762	9.150			56.861
3	Guang Yuging	9.612	9.550		9.775			9.525	9.587	48.049
4	Russia	96.410		97.122		96.273		95.710		385.515
4	Dina Kochetkova	9.675	9.750	9.725	9.762	9.750	9.762	9.425	9.712	77.561
4	Svetlana Khorkina	9.762	9.712	9.800	9.862	9.700	9.387	9.612	9.675	77.510
4	Elena Lebedeva	9.475	9.725	9.562	9.712	9.600	9.625	9.387	9.687	76.748
4	Elena Grosheva	9.537	9.612	9.612	9.712	9.675	9.200	9.325	9.675	76.348
4	Evgenia Roschina	9.387	9.562	8.900	9.675	9.587	9.525	9.575	9.587	75.797
4	Oksana Fabrichnova	9.600	9.237	9.625	9.750	9.587	9.662	9.400		58.401
4	Natalia Ivanova									0.000
5	Ukraine	95.697		95.887		95.500		95.173		382.254
5	Lilia Podkopayeva	9.787	9.712	9.812	9.675	9.787	9.837	9.775	9.837	78.222
5	Irina Bulakhova	9.675	9.462	9.600	9.725	9.637	9.537	9.650	9.675	76.961
5	Tatiana Malaya	9.400	9.450	9.450	9.525	8.837	9.025	9.412	9.550	74.649
5	Olena Shaparna	9.512	9.450	9.450	8.775		9.425	9.512	9.425	65.549
5	Oksana Knizhnik	9.562	9.637			9.475	9.675	9.625	9.537	57.511
5	Olesya Shulga	9.250		9.312	9.475	9.587		9.437	9.575	56.636
5	Natalia Panteleyeva		9.500	9.400	8.687	9.150	9.387			46.124
6	Belarus	94.923		95.598		94.024		94.747		379.292
6	Elena Piskun	9.687	9.837	9.700	9.775	9.250	9.700	9.562	9.762	77.273
6	Svetlana Tarasevich	9.600	9.475	9.650	9.687	9.312	9.487	9.262	9.562	76.035
6	Olga Yurkina	9.275	9.500	9.550	9.412	9.325	9.325	9.287	9.625	75.299
6	Alena Polozkova	9.487	9.512	9.562	8.950	9.275	9.675	9.212	9.325	74.998
6	Yulia Yurkina	9.112		9.475	9.412	9.275	9.325	9.325	9.625	65.549
6	Aleksandra Kulbitskaya	9.200	9.350				9.400	9.375	9.662	46.987
6	Lyudmila Vityukova	9.200	9.350				9.400	9.375	9.662	46.987
7	France	93.034		93.249		91.473		92.261		370.017
7	Élodie Lussac	9.450	9.500	9.687	9.500	9.237	9.800	9.387	9.450	76.011
7	Cécile Canqueteau	8.962	9.537	9.600	9.375	9.025	9.650	9.112	9.350	74.611
7	Laure Gély	9.137	9.487	9.475	9.250	8.800	9.475	9.075	9.300	73.999
7	Frédérique Marotte	9.112	9.150	8.837	9.350	8.712	9.262	9.075	9.225	72.723
7	Christelle Marconnet	9.300	9.187	8.325	9.325	8.550	8.962	8.962	9.325	71.936
7	Anne Etienne	8.937	9.362	8.825	9.275	7.675				44.074
7	Carine Muntoni						8.937	8.850	8.750	26.437
8	Spain	93.936		91.959		91.198		91.984		369.077
8	Mónica Martín	9.525	9.550	9.525	8.762	9.275	9.312	9.287	9.675	74.911
8	Sonia Fraguas	9.437	9.425	9.575	9.350	9.000	9.412	8.900	8.812	73.911
8	Ana Pérez	9.300	9.537	8.762	9.262	8.687	9.050	8.987	9.400	72.985
8	Verónica Castro	9.137	9.300	8.462	9.137	8.325	9.462	9.037	9.312	72.172
8	Elisabeth Valle	9.225	9.500	8.162	8.962		8.450	8.937	9.212	62.448
8	Ruth Rollán	8.950	9.287			9.275	8.700	8.862	9.237	54.311
8	Mercedes Pacheco			9.612	9.312	9.025				27.949
9	Japan	93.324		92.497		90.661		91.984		368.466
9	Mari Kosuge	9.362	9.187	9.387	8.975	9.375	9.300	9.387	9.100	74.073
9	Risa Sugawara	9.250	9.575	9.387	9.487	8.675	8.225	9.312	9.575	73.486
9	Satsuki Obata	8.750	9.275	9.287	8.862	9.150	9.612	8.887	9.100	72.923
9	Aya Sekine	9.175	9.375	7.612	8.537	9.237	8.887	9.137	8.887	70.847
9	Masumi Okawa	9.125	9.400			8.875	8.675	9.137	8.837	54.049
9	Hanako Miura	9.275	9.512	9.225	9.312			9.187		46.511
9	Yuka Arai			9.225	9.350	9.125	8.425		9.162	45.287
10	Canada	93.184		91.922		88.785		92.735		366.626
10	Lena Degteva	9.337	9.287	9.412	9.487	8.400	9.450	9.112	9.362	73.847
10	Marilou Cousineau	9.312	9.400	8.337	9.487	8.525	9.337	9.075	9.325	72.773
10	Lisa Simes	9.200	9.450	8.900	9.237	8.337	9.062	8.912	9.575	72.673
10	Jaime Hill		9.387	9.325	9.337	7.975	9.512	9.125	9.325	63.986
10	Theresa Wolf	9.187	9.437	9.100	9.300		8.950		9.250	55.224
10	Eve-Marie Poulin	9.087	9.387	7.975	6.550	8.300		9.187		50.486
10	Jennifer Exaltacion	8.900				8.300	9.562	9.137	9.512	45.411
11	Hungary	94.084		88.371		90.323		91.523		364.301
11	Adrienn Nyeste	9.587	9.137	8.225	8.512	9.312	9.312	9.225	9.437	72.747
11	Erika Gibala	8.987	9.300	9.162	8.962	8.725	8.950	8.962	9.275	72.323
11	Ildikó Balog	9.212	9.387	8.737	9.025	9.125	8.725	9.025	8.875	72.111
11	Ildikó Dragoner	9.512	9.537	8.162	8.662	8.537	9.037	9.100	9.487	72.034
11	Eszter Óváry	9.350	9.487	8.512	9.012	9.100	8.500	9.075	8.912	71.948
11	Andrea Molnár	9.325		8.812	9.262	8.737	9.300	9.112	7.200	61.748
11	Rita Jokuthy		9.387							9.387
12	United Kingdom	93.297		88.535		87.611		92.273		361.716
12	Annika Reeder	9.537	9.325	9.287	8.350	8.325	9.350	9.225	9.650	73.049
12	Zita Lusack	9.262	9.400	8.300	9.400	8.750	8.962	9.075	9.512	72.661
12	Gemma Cuff	9.262	9.350	9.000	9.062	8.400	8.637	8.875	9.312	71.898
12	Andrea Leman	8.800	9.237	8.237	8.175	7.825	8.262	8.987	9.312	68.835
12	Karin Szymko		9.362	8.062	8.987	8.287	9.150	9.125	9.087	62.060
12	Anna-Liese Acklam	9.125	9.087			8.575	9.175	8.950	9.125	54.037
12	Gabriela Fuchs	9.437		9.000	8.912					27.349
