= List of Olympic female artistic gymnasts for Australia =

Australian female gymnasts

Gymnastics events have been staged at the Olympic Games since 1896. Australian female gymnasts have participated in every Summer Olympics since 1956. A total of 48 female gymnasts have represented Australia. Australian women have not won any medals at the Olympics. Lisa Skinner is the only Australian female gymnast who has competed in at least three Olympics.

== Gymnasts ==
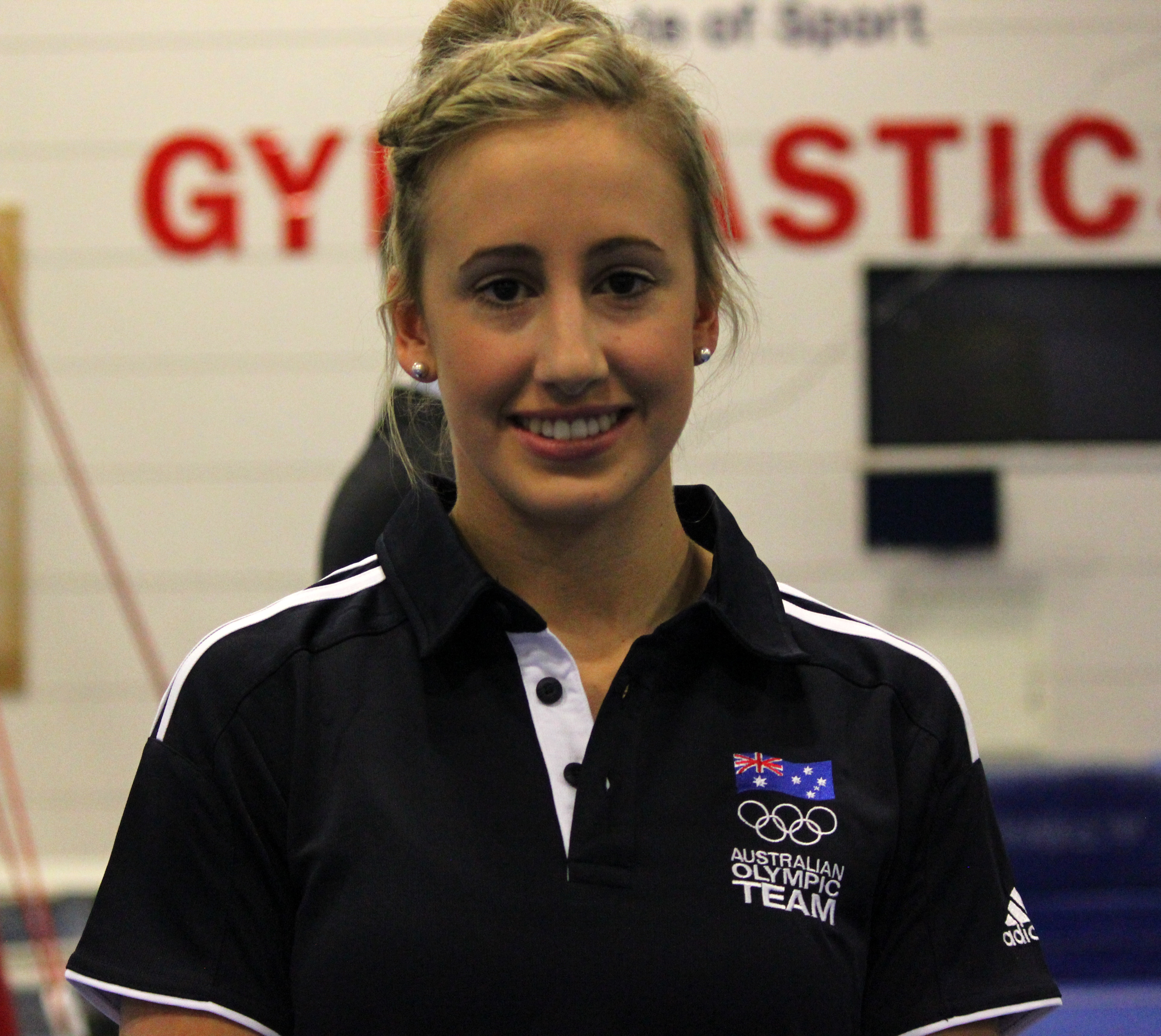
Ashleigh Brennan

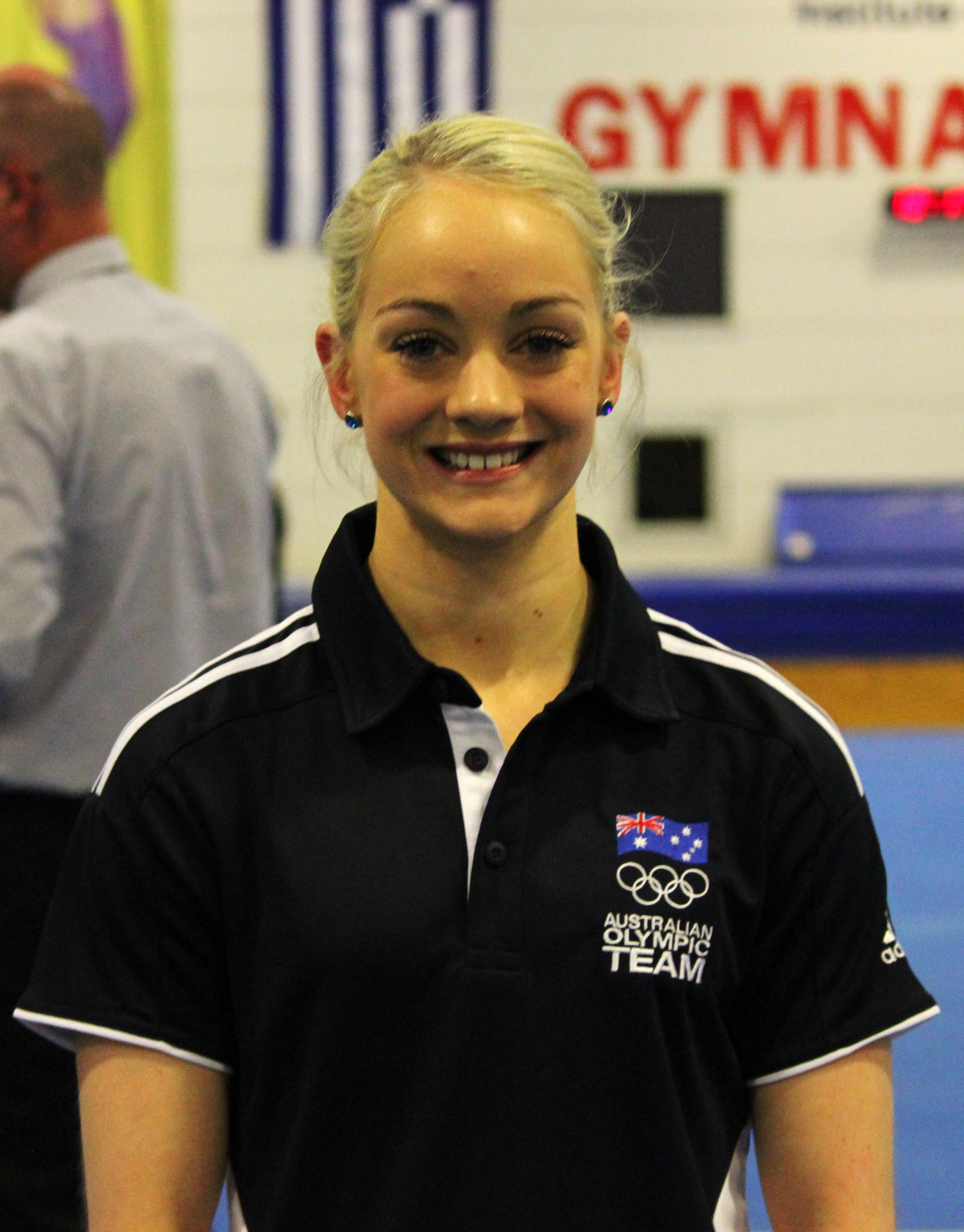
Larrissa Miller

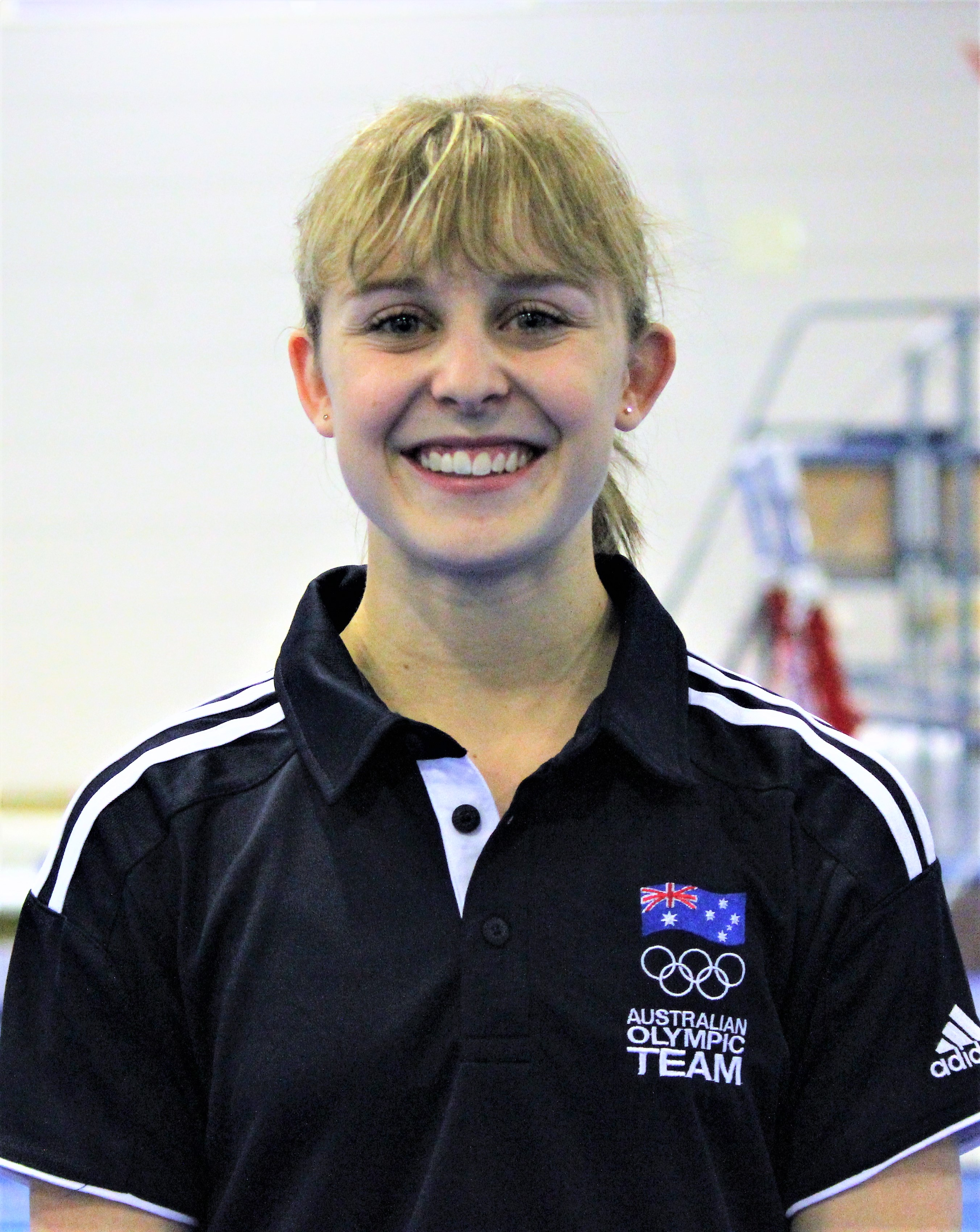
Lauren Mitchell

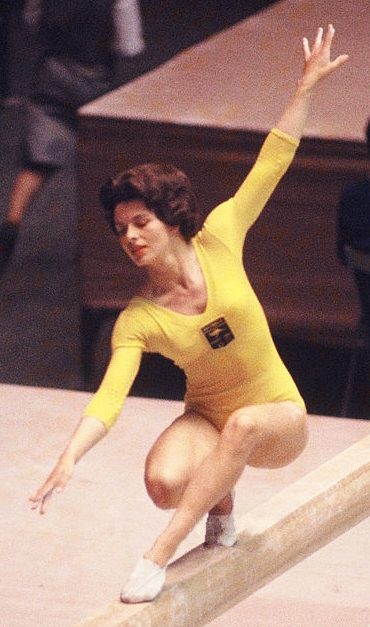
Val Roberts

Gymnast	Years	Ref.
Monique Allen	1988, 1992	
Keri Battersby	1984	
Kerry Bayliss	1980	
Jan Bedford	1964	
Georgia Bonora	2008, 2012	
Kaye Breadsell	1960	
Ashleigh Brennan	2008, 2012	
Val Buffham-Norris	1964, 1968	
Barbara Cage	1964	
Melinda Cleland	2000	
Alexandra Croak	2000	
Barbara Cunningham	1956	
Barbara Fletcher	1964	
Ing Fraser	1956	
Georgia Godwin	2020	
Brooke Gysen	1992	
Joanna Hughes	1996	
Daria Joura	2008	
Nicole Kantek	1996	
Kirsty Leigh-Brown	1996	
Emily Little	2012	
Wanita Lynch	1976	
Kate McDonald	2024	
Trudy McIntosh	2000	
Larrissa Miller	2012, 2016	
Lauren Mitchell	2008, 2012	
Julie-Anne Monico	1992	
Ruth Moniz	1996	
Stephanie Moorhouse	2004	
Shona Morgan	2008	
Lisa Moro	1996	
Melissa Munro	2004	
Emma Nedov	2024	
Karen Nguyen	2004	
Wendy Nicholls	1956	
Ruby Pass	2024	
Lisa Read	1992	
Val Roberts	1960, 1964	
Monette Russo	2004	
Leanne Rycroft	1988	
Breanna Scott	2024	
Kylie Shadbolt	1992	
Lisa Skinner	1996, 2000, 2004	
Allana Slater	2000, 2004	
Jenny Smith	1996	
Marina Sulicich	1980	
Jenny Sunderland	1972	
Olivia Vivian	2008	
Brooke Walker	2000	
Jane Warrilow	1992	
Emily Whitehead	2020, 2024	
Kellie Wilson	1984	
