= Gymnastics at the 1996 Summer Olympics – Women's floor =

Women's floor at the Games of the XXVI Olympiad
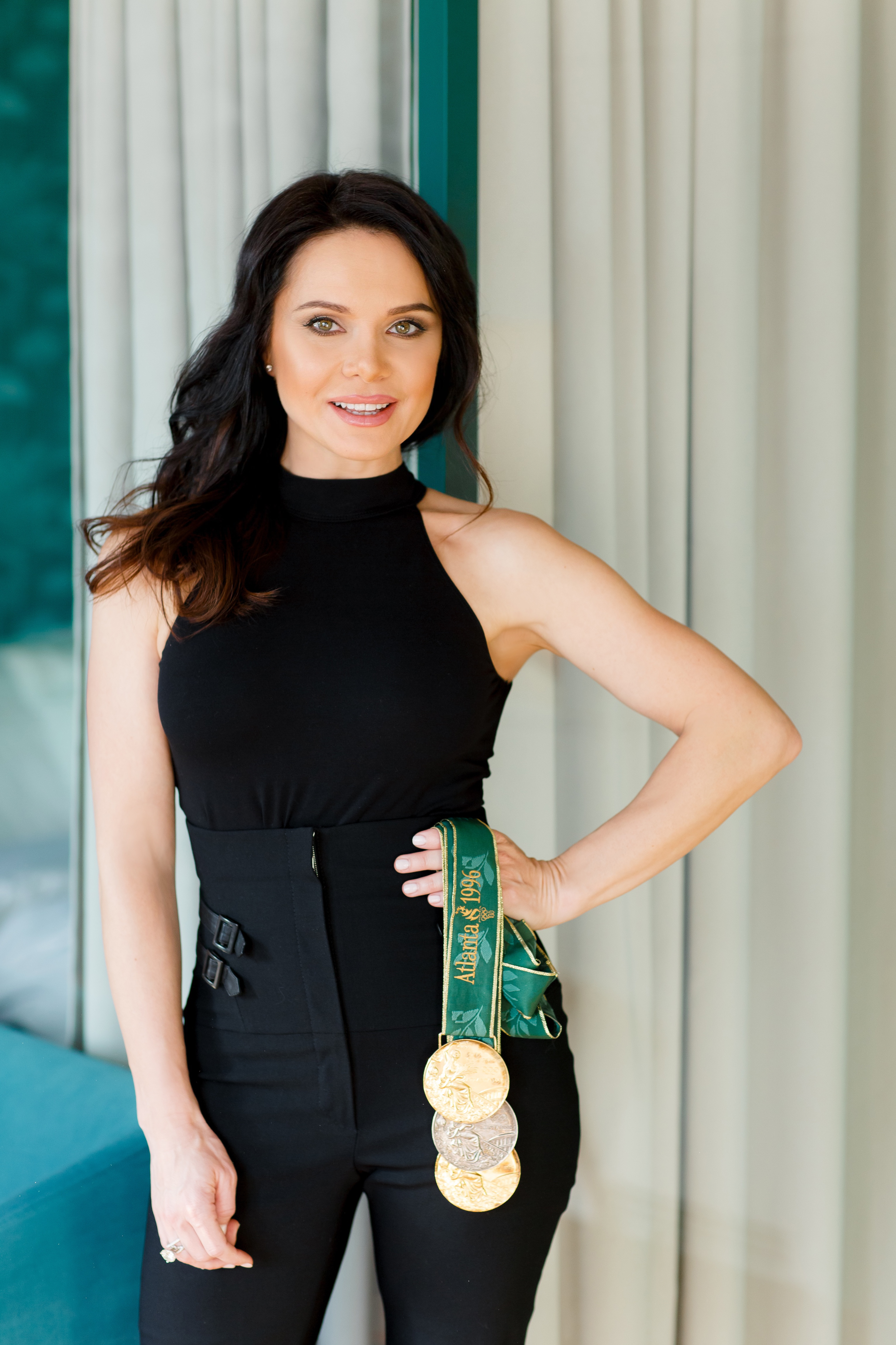
- Gold medalist Liliya Podkopayeva (2021)
- Venue: Georgia Dome
- Date: July 21 – 29, 1996
- Competitors: 96 from 28 nations

Medalists
1st place, gold medalist(s)		Lilia Podkopayeva	Ukraine
2nd place, silver medalist(s)		Simona Amânar	Romania
3rd place, bronze medalist(s)		Dominique Dawes	United States

These are the results of the women's floor competition, one of six events for female competitors in artistic gymnastics at the 1996 Summer Olympics in Atlanta. The qualification and final rounds took place on July 21, 23 and 29th at the Georgia Dome.

The medals for the competition were presented by Ashwini Kumar, IOC Member, India; and the medalists' bouquets were presented by Jackie Fie, FIG Women's Technical Committee President, United States.

== Results ==
=== Qualification ===
Ninety-two gymnasts competed in the floor event during the compulsory and optional rounds on July 21 and 23. The eight highest scoring gymnasts advanced to the final on July 29. Each country was limited to two competitors in the final.

Rank	Gymnast	Score
1	Kerri Strug* (USA)	19.662
2	Lilia Podkopayeva (UKR)	19.612
3	Simona Amânar (ROU)	19.599
4	Dominique Moceanu (USA)	19.587
4	Ji Liya (CHN)	19.587
6	Gina Gogean (ROU)	19.562
7	Dominique Dawes (USA)	19.537
8	Mo Huilan (CHN)	19.525
8	Elena Grosheva** (RUS)	19.525
11	Dina Kochetkova (RUS)	19.462

* Did not participate due to injury and was replaced by teammate Dominique Dawes
** Did not compete and was replaced by teammate Dina Kochetkova

=== Final ===
Rank	Gymnast	Score
Gold medal	Lilia Podkopayeva (UKR)	9.887
Silver medal	Simona Amânar (ROU)	9.850
Bronze medal	Dominique Dawes (USA)	9.837
4	Dominique Moceanu (USA)	9.825
5	Dina Kochetkova (RUS)	9.800
6	Mo Huilan (CHN)	9.700
7	Gina Gogean (ROU)	9.662
8	Ji Liya (CHN)	9.637
