= Ji Liya =

Chinese artistic gymnast

- Born: October 20, 1981 (age 44) Hengyang, Hunan
- Height: 155 cm (5 ft 1 in)

Gymnastics career
- Discipline: Women's artistic gymnastics
- Country represented: China
- Retired: 1998
Medal record
Women's artistic gymnastics
Representing China
World Championships
Silver medal – second place	1995 Sabae	Team
Silver medal – second place	1995 Sabae	Floor Exercise
East Asian Games
Gold medal – first place	1997 Busan	Team
Gold medal – first place	1997 Busan	Vault
National Games
Gold medal – first place	1997 Shanghai	Team
Silver medal – second place	1997 Shanghai	Vault

Ji Liya (born 1981, Chinese name: 吉麗雅) is a Chinese gymnast. She competed at the 1995 World Artistic Gymnastics Championships, winning a silver medal on Floor and team with Mo Huilan, Liu Xuan, Meng Fei, Mao Yanling, Qiao Ya, Ye Linlin. She also competed at the 1996 Atlanta Olympic Games, finishing eighth in the floor routine and was a part of the Chinese team that finished in fourth position.

== Eponympous skill ==
Ji has one eponymous skill listed in the Code of Points.

Apparatus	Name	Description	Difficulty (Note: Valid for the 2022-2024 Code of Points)
Uneven bars	Ji	Swing forward to salto backward stretched with 2½ turn (900°)	D
