= Grossenbacher =

Grossenbacher is a family name of Swiss-German origin that may refer to:

- Christian Grossenbacher (born 1980), Swiss hurdler and 2009 World Military Champion
- Martha Grossenbacher (born 1959), Swiss sprint athlete
- Pascale Grossenbacher (born 1978), Swiss female artistic gymnast
- Roland Grossenbacher, Swiss lawyer

== See also ==
- Grossenbacher Nunatak, Antarctic location
