= Gymnastics at the 1997 Games of the Small States of Europe =

Gymnastics events at the 1997 Games of the Small States of Europe were held in Reykjavík, Iceland.

== Medalists ==
=== Artistic gymnastics ===
==== Men ====
Event	Gold	Silver	Bronze
All-around	Rúnar Alexandersson (ISL)	Herodotos Giorgallas (CYP) Andreas Kousios (CYP)	—

==== Women ====
Event	Gold	Silver	Bronze
All-around	Antri Agathocleous (CYP)	Elva Jónsdóttir (ISL)	Constantia Kousoulou (CYP)
Uneven bars	Laetitia Bégué (MON)	Unknown	Unknown
Balance beam	Gaëlle Trotebas (MON)	Unknown	Unknown
