= Naho =

- Gender: Female

Origin
- Origin: Japanese
- Meaning: Different meanings depending on the kanji used

Naho (written: 菜穂, 菜保, 奈穂, 南穂 or 直歩) is a feminine Japanese given name. Notable people with the name include:

- Naho Emoto (江本 奈穂; born 1985), Japanese softball player
- Naho Hoshiyama (星山 菜穂; born 1980), Japanese gymnast
- Naho Miyoshi (三好 南穂; born 1993), Japanese basketball player
- Naho Sato (佐藤 南帆; born 2001), Japanese tennis player
- Naho Sugiyama (杉山 直歩; born 1978), Japanese mixed martial artist
- Naho Terashima (寺島 奈穂; born 1993), Japanese ice hockey player
- Naho Toda (戸田 菜穂; born 1974), Japanese actress
- Naho Yoshimi (吉見 菜保; born 1972), Japanese ice hockey player

== See also ==
- Nahomi Kawasumi (川澄 奈穂美; born 1985), Japanese women's footballer
- National Aboriginal Health Organization (NAHO)
