= Ianculescu =

Ianculescu is a surname. Notable people with the surname include:

- Adrian Ianculescu (born 1973), Romanian artistic gymnast
- Alexandra Ianculescu (born 1991), Romanian-Canadian speed skater
- Eugenia de Reuss Ianculescu (1866–1938), Romanian teacher, writer, and women's rights activist
- Magda Ianculescu (1929–1995), Romanian operatic soprano and voice teacher
