= Svitlana Zelepukina =

Ukrainian gymnast (born 1980)

- Born: 16 August 1980 (age 46) Kirovohrad, Ukrainian SSR, Soviet Union
- Height: 147 cm (4 ft 10 in)

Gymnastics career
- Discipline: Women's artistic gymnastics
- Country represented: Ukraine
Medal record
European Youth Olympic Festival
Silver medal – second place	1995 Bath	Vault
Silver medal – second place	1995 Bath	Team
Bronze medal – third place	1995 Bath	Asymmetric bars

Svitlana Zelepukina (born 16 August 1980) is a Ukrainian gymnast. She competed at the 1996 Summer Olympics, where she finished 23rd in the all around.

== Early career ==
Zelepukina began training in artistic gymnastics at the age of eight at the Specialized Youth Sports School of Olympic Reserve “Nadiya” in Kropyvnytskyi under coach O. Sirenko, with whom she progressed from the beginner level to elite international competition.

== Competitive career ==
Zelepukina competed at the 1995 World Championships in Sabae, Japan, where the Ukrainian team finished fifth. In the same year, she represented Ukraine at the USA-Ukraine dual meet in the United States, placing fifth in the individual all-around, and at the “Moscow Stars” tournament in Russia, where she finished 14th in the all-around.

In 1996, as part of her Olympic preparation, she competed in a series of international events, including the American Cup (15th in the all-around), and the International Mixed Pairs competition (3rd in the team all-around). She was the winner of the 1996 Ukrainian Cup. She qualified to compete at the 1996 Summer Olympics in Atlanta, United States. At the Olympic Games, she represented Ukraine in women’s artistic gymnastics. Her strongest result came in the team competition, where, together with Teslenko, Sheremeta, Podkopayeva, Myrhorodska, Knyzhnyk, and Shaparna, the Ukrainian team placed fifth with a score of 385.841 points.

In the individual all-around competition, she advanced through qualification to the final, finishing 23rd with a score of 38.024 points. She did not qualify for any apparatus finals. Her apparatus results were as follows: balance beam 19.062 (16th place); uneven bars 19.300 (25th place); vault 19.162 (28th place); floor exercise 19.174 (34th place).

== Retirement ==
In 1997, following a significant loss of vision in one eye, she retired from professional sport and began working as a coach. She graduated with a Master’s degree in Sports from the Central Ukrainian State University.

== Competitive history summary ==
Year	Competition	Location	Event	Result
1995	World Championships	Sabae, Japan	Team	5th
1996	Olympic Games	Atlanta, United States	Team	5th
1996	Olympic Games	Atlanta, United States	All-Around	23rd

== See also ==
- List of Olympic female artistic gymnasts for Ukraine
