= Olga Yurkina =

Belarusian artistic gymnast (born 1979)

- Ольга Вячеславовна Юркина
- Full name: Olga Vyacheslavovna Yurkina
- Alternative names: Volha Viachaslavauna Yurkina; Вольга Вячаславаўна Юркiна
- Born: 21 September 1979 (age 46) Minsk, Byelorussian SSR, Soviet Union

Gymnastics career
- Discipline: Women's artistic gymnastics
- Country represented: Belarus
- Retired: c. 1996
Medal record
Women's artistic gymnastics
Representing Belarus
Universiade
Gold medal – first place	1995 Fukuoka	Floor

Olga Vyacheslavovna Yurkina (born 21 September 1979) is a Belarusian former artistic gymnast. She was a member of the Belarus women's national artistic gymnastics team and competed at the 1996 Summer Olympics, as well as multiple World and European Championships in the 1990s.

== Gymnastics career ==
Yurkina competed at the 1994 International Gymnix and won the all-around.

Yurkina competed at the 1996 Summer Olympics. Alongside teammates Elena Piskun, Alena Polozkova, Svetlana Boginskaya, Lyudmila Vityukova, Svetlana Tarasevich, and Tatyana Zharganova, the Belarusians placed sixth in the women's artistic team all-around, the highest finish in Belarusian history.

== Post-gymnastics career ==
After the 1996 Olympics, Yurkina relocated to the United States. She currently coaches at Roswell Gymnastics in Roswell, Georgia, along with her sister Yulia.
