= Sun Dome Fukui =

Indoor arena in Echizen, Fukui, Japan

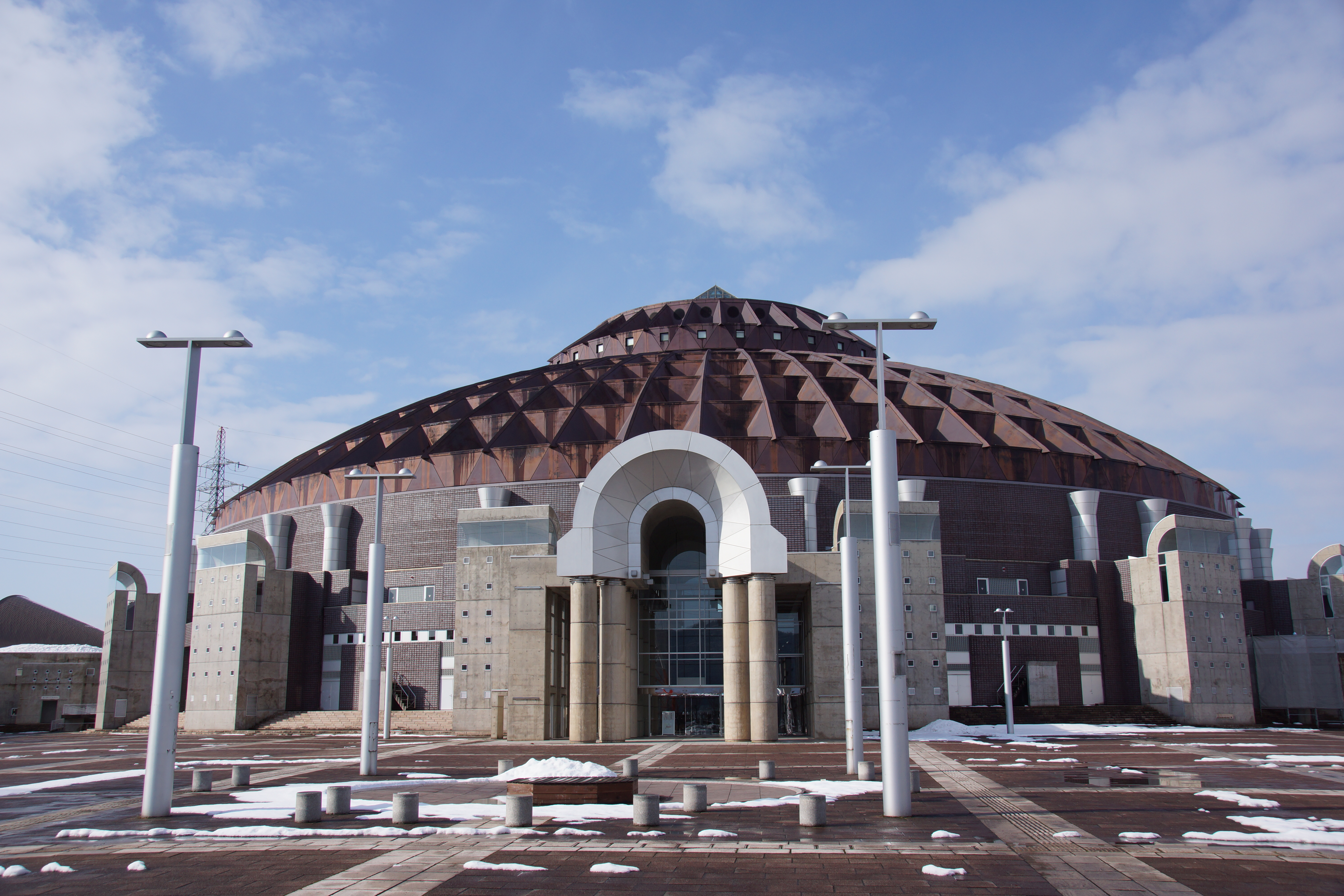
- Interactive map of Sun Dome Fukui
- Location: Echizen, Fukui, Japan
- Coordinates: 35.930822°N 136.185644°E
- Operator: Fukui Prefectural Industrial Technology Center
- Capacity: 10,000

Construction
- Opened: 1995

Sun Dome Fukui is a multi-purpose indoor arena in Echizen, Fukui, Japan. The capacity of the arena is 10,000 and was opened in 1995.

The hall hosted some for the 1995 World Artistic Gymnastics Championships.
