= Klaudia Kinská =

Slovak gymnast (born 1978)

Personal information
- Nationality: Slovak
- Born: 15 June 1978 (age 46); Košice, Czechoslovakia

Sport
- Sport: Gymnastics, Bodybuilding

Klaudia Kinská (born 15 June 1978) is a Slovak retired gymnast and bodybuilder. She competed in Gymnastics at the 1996 Summer Olympics.

== Gymnastics career ==
Kinská was born on 16 June 1978 in Košice.

Kinská started with gymnastics as a four-year old. She trained at the sports club of the VSŽ Košice. Kinská participated in the 1993 World Championships in Birmingham, England. She took part in the All-Around at the 1994 European Championships in Stockholm, Sweden.

She reached the peak of her gymnastics career at the age of 18 with her participation at the 1996 Summer Olympics in Atlanta, where she placed 70th in the women's artistic team all-around. By doing so, she became the first gymnast to represent independent Slovakia. The Olympics performance was the last in Kinská's gymnastics career, because she realized she had reached her performance peak by classifying for the Olympics and there was nothing more she could possibly achieve in the sport.

== Bodybuilding career ==
After the end of her career in gymnastics, Kinská competed in bodybuilding In 1999, she won the IFBB World Amateur Fitness Championships in Sidney, Australia. She also successfully competed at the Arnold Classic, placing 10th in 2000 and 6th in 2002. In 2000 she placed 8th at Ms. Olympia. Further to these achievements, Kinská achieved second-place finishes at the 2000 Fitness Grand Prix in Rimini, Italy and the 2001 Hungarian Pro Fitness Championship in Budapest. In April 2002, Kinská won the first professional fitness contest in Slovakia, called The Slovak Pro Fitness Classic, which was held in Bratislava.

== Later life ==
Following the end of her bodybuilding career, Kinská opened a beauty salon in Košice and worked as a private coach at a public gym.

== Personal life ==
Kinská has two sons: Ryan and Wayne.
