= Choi Mi-seon (gymnast) =

South Korean gymnast

Personal information
- Nationality: South Korean
- Born: 30 March 1980 (age 45); Yongin, South Korea

Sport
- Sport: Gymnastics

Choi Mi-seon (born 30 March 1980) is a South Korean gymnast. She competed at the 2000 Summer Olympics.
