= Nistor Șandro =

Romanian gymnast

- Born: 17 September 1974 (age 51) Oradea, Socialist Republic of Romania
- Height: 1.69 m (5 ft 7 in)

Gymnastics career
- Discipline: Men's artistic gymnastics
- Country represented: Romania
- Club: CSA Steaua București

Nistor Șandro (born 17 September 1974) is a Romanian gymnast. He competed at the 1996 Summer Olympics.
