= Kirsty-Leigh Brown =

Australian gymnast

- Born: 13 November 1981 (age 44) Albury, New South Wales, Australia
- Height: 156 cm (5 ft 1 in)

Gymnastics career
- Discipline: Women's artistic gymnastics
- Country represented: Australia

Kirsty-Leigh Brown (born 13 November 1981) is an Australian artistic gymnast. She represented Australia at the 1996 Summer Olympics.

== Career ==
When she was nine, Brown began training at the Australian Institute of Sport in Canberra for 36 hours per week. She competed at the 1995 World Championships where the Australian team finished 12th. She finished fifth in the all-around at the 1996 Australian Olympic Trials. When she was 14, she was selected to competed for the 1996 Australian Olympic team. The Australian team finished in 10th place.

As of 2021, Brown works as a gymnastics coach.
