= Adrian Ianculescu =

Romanian artistic gymnast

Andrian Ianculescu
- Born: 28 October 1973 (age 52) Lugoj, Timiș, Romania

Gymnastics career
- Discipline: Men's artistic gymnastics
- Country represented: Romania
- Head coach: Danuţ Grecu
- Assistant coach: Mihai Gheorghe
Medal record
World Championships
Bronze medal – third place	1995 Sabae	Team
Bronze medal – third place	1997 Lausanne	Vault

Andrian Ianculescu (born 28 October 1973) is a retired Romanian artistic gymnast. He is a bronze world medalist with the team and on vault.
