= Jaycie Phelps =

American gymnast

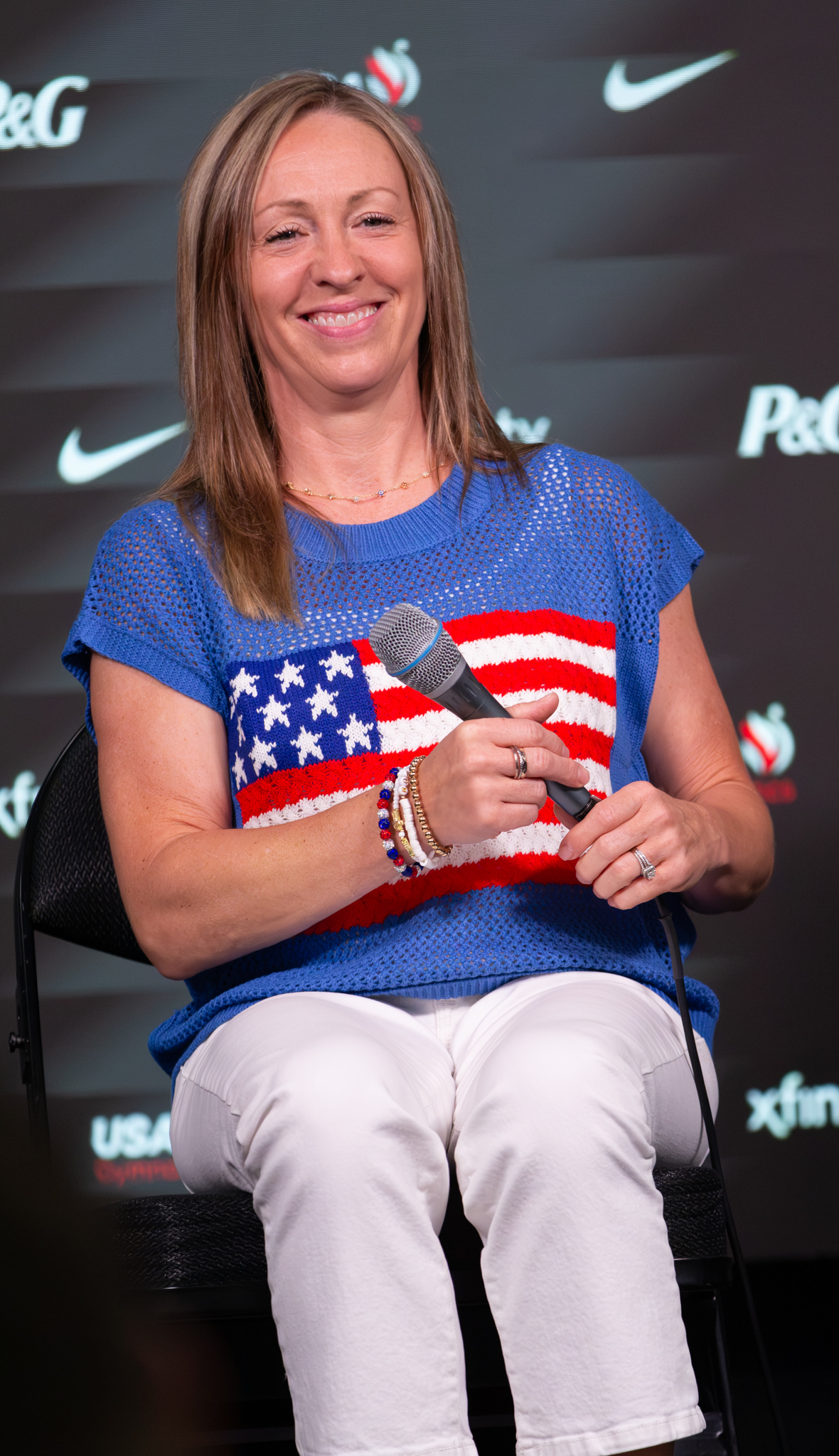
- Phelps in 2026

Personal information
- Full name: Jaycie Lynn Phelps
- Born: September 26, 1979 (age 46)

Gymnastics career
- Discipline: Women's artistic gymnastics
- Country represented: United States (1994–1997)
- Club: Cincinnati Gymnastics Academy
- Head coach: Mary Lee Tracy
- Eponymous skills: Phelps (Vault)
Medal record
Women's artistic gymnastics
Representing the United States
Olympic Games
Gold medal – first place	1996 Atlanta	Team
World Championships
Silver medal – second place	1994 Dortmund	Team
Bronze medal – third place	1995 Sabae	Team
National Championships
Silver medal – second place	1996 Knoxville	All Around
Bronze medal – third place	1995 New Orleans	All Around

Jaycie Lynn Phelps (born September 26, 1979) is an American retired Olympic gymnast and member of the 1996 Olympic gold medal U.S. women's gymnastics team, the Magnificent Seven. She is known for her consistency and clean lines in her gymnastics.

== Personal life ==
Jaycie Phelps was born on September 26, 1979, in Indianapolis, Indiana, and grew up in Greenfield, Indiana. She is the daughter of Jack and Cheryl. She has one older brother, Dennis. She was married to 2004 Olympic gymnast Brett McClure in 2005. They have divorced as of 2008. Today, she is the owner and head coach of the Jaycie Phelps Athletic Center in Greenfield, Indiana. In 2014, she married Dave Marus.

== Gymnastics career ==
=== Early years ===
Jaycie Phelps began gymnastics at the age of four at Indiana Gymnast in Greenfield, Indiana, and attended once-a-week practice before doing two-a-week practices and building up from there. At age 11, after progressing to the point where her family felt she could benefit from a new coach, she and her family moved to Scottsdale, Arizona and she trained at Desert Devils Gymnastics for extensive training. She attended the 1993 Junior National Championships, but ended up in 24th place, and wanted to quit altogether. After receiving encouragement from her parents, who wanted her to give it another shot, she went and trained at Cincinnati Gymnastics Academy in Cincinnati, Ohio, training alongside future Olympic teammate, Amanda Borden. Jaycie's father and brother went back to Indiana whilst Jaycie and her mother stayed in Cincinnati.

=== 1994 ===
Phelps made her senior debut at the 1994 American Classic in Orlando, Florida, which also served as the trials for the 1994 World Championships. She placed 15th and did not make the team. She attended the 1994 Olympic Festival in St. Louis, Missouri and placed 3rd all-around, plus 5th on balance beam and 6th on floor exercise. At the 1994 U.S. Classic, she placed 3rd in the all-around. She later attended the 1994 Senior National Championships and placed 6th. After doing well and placing 5th in the 1994 World Team Trials in Richmond, Virginia, she was selected to be part of the team to go to the 1994 World Team Championships in Dortmund, Germany, where she won a silver medal.

=== 1995 ===
In 1995, she kicked off the year by competing at the 1995 American Classic in Oakland, California, which also served as the trials for the 1995 Pan American Games. She placed 8th in the all-around, tied for 3rd on the uneven bars, and placed 6th on beam, yet didn't make the team. The year followed with appearances at the Reese's International Gymnastics Cup, McDonald's American Cup, and the International Mixed Pairs. She then rallied at the 1995 Classic, winning 1st in the all-around, uneven bars, balance beam, and floor exercise, and placed 2nd on vault. At the 1995 National Championships, she placed 3rd, behind Dominique Moceanu and Shannon Miller. She was selected at the 1995 World Trials to attend the 1995 World Championships in Sabae, Japan after petitioning in her score at nationals since she injured herself and couldn't compete. She won the bronze medal in the team competition, and qualified for the event final on the uneven bars and placed 8th.

=== 1996 ===
1996 was yet another successful year for Phelps. After strong showings at the American Classic, the 1996 Budget Rent a Car Gymnastics Invitational dual against France, and the 1996 World Championships, she placed 2nd in the all-around at the 1996 National Championships, 0.05 behind Shannon Miller. At the Olympic Trials in Boston, Massachusetts, she placed 1st after day 1. On day 2, she over-rotated her dismount on the balance beam and stumbled into a backward roll, but strong performances on the other apparatus helped her place 3rd all-around, securing a spot on the 1996 US Olympic Women's Gymnastics Team.

==== 1996 Olympic Games ====
At the 1996 Olympic Games in Atlanta, Georgia, Phelps competed on all four events in both compulsories and optionals. She was typically first or second up on each apparatus, but her contributions were invaluable. In the compulsories, she had a shaky performance on the beam and fell, but good routines on the bars, floor, and vault helped her team place second behind Russia. In the optionals, she performed solidly, placing high on all four events and contributing to the team's first-ever Olympic gold medal. She also placed 17th in the all-around, but four of her teammates (Shannon Miller, Dominique Dawes, Kerri Strug, and Dominique Moceanu) placed higher than her. Due to the fact that only three gymnasts from each country could perform in the all-around competition, Phelps could not compete in the final.

=== Comeback ===
In October 1999, Phelps announced for a comeback in hopes of making the 2000 Olympic Games in Sydney. She was not the only gymnast from the Magnificent Seven who announced a comeback for the 2000 Olympics; teammates Dominique Dawes, Dominique Moceanu, Amy Chow, and Shannon Miller were also vying for spots on the Olympic team. At the 2000 Classic, she competed on uneven bars, balance beam, and floor exercise, and qualified for the 2000 National Championships. She competed on day 1 of nationals, but withdrew on day 2 and petitioned to go to the 2000 Olympic Trials, but her petition was denied. Following a knee injury, she ultimately decided to retire from gymnastics.

== Eponymous skills ==
Apparatus	Name	Description	Difficulty	When Added to Code of Points
Vault	Phelps	Tsukahara (1/2-on) with half turn to laid-out Arabian front	4.4	1994 World Artistic Gymnastics Championships (Team)

== Awards and achievements ==
Phelps was inducted into the U.S. Gymnastics Hall of Fame in 1998 as a member of the 1996 U.S. gymnastics team. In 2008, she was inducted into the United States Olympic Hall of Fame in the team category. The team received their award in Chicago with other Olympic greats. Following their Olympic performance, they also made an appearance on the box of Wheaties and were featured in the book The Magnificent Seven

Phelps was awarded Sagamore of the Wabash, which is the highest award bestowed upon an Indiana resident, and the Ohio Governor's Award.

Colerain Township proclaimed August 30, 1996 as "Jaycie Phelps Day".

A street in Cincinnati, Ohio, was renamed in her honor as Jaycie Phelps Drive. And on the east side of Greenfield, Indiana, there is now a road named Jaycie Phelps Road.

Phelps opened Jaycie Phelps Athletic with her husband in Greenfield, Indiana.

== Major results ==
=== National results ===
- 2000 John Hancock U.S. Gymnastics Championships, St. Louis;
- 2000 U.S. Classic, Tulsa, Okla.; 14-AA
- 1996 U.S. Olympic Trials-Gymnastics, Boston, Mass.; 3rd-AA
- 1996 Coca-Cola National Championships, Knoxville, Tenn.; 2nd-AA
- 1996 American Classic/World Championships Trials, Tulsa, Okla.; 1st-AA
- 1995 World Team Trials, Austin, Texas; 3rd-AA (injured-based on National Championships score only)
- 1995 Coca-Cola National Championships, New Orleans, La.; 3rd-AA, 4th(t)-UB, 5th-V, 6th-FX
- 1995 U.S. Classic, Birmingham, Ala.; 1st-AA, UB, BB & FX, 2nd-V
- 1995 American Classic/Pan American Games Trials, Oakland, Calif.; 8th-AA, 3rd(t)-UB, 6th-BB
- 1994 NationsBank World Team Trials, Richmond, Va.; 5th-AA
- 1994 Coca-Cola National Championships, Nashville, Tenn.; 6th-AA, 5th-UB, BB & FX
- 1994 U.S. Classic, Palm Springs, Calif.; 3rd-AA
- 1994 U.S. Olympic Festival, St. Louis, Mo.; 3rd-AA, 4th-Team, 5th-BB, 6th-FX
- 1994 American Classic/World Championships Trials, Orlando, Fla.; 15th(t)-AA
- 1993 Coca-Cola National Championships, Salt Lake City, Utah; 24th-AA (jr. division)
- 1993 U.S. Classic, Austin, Texas; 15th-AA (jr. division)

=== International results ===
- 1996 Olympic Games, Atlanta, Ga.; 1st-Team, 17th-AA (Competition I)
- 1996 Individual Event World Championships, San Juan, Puerto Rico; 8th-UB, 7th-BB
- 1996 Budget Rent a Car Gymnastics Invitational USA vs. France, Miami, Fla.; 1st-Team
- 1995 World Championships, Sabae, Japan; 3rd-Team, 7th-UB
- 1995 International Mixed Pairs, Seattle, Wash.; 9th-AA (with partner Josh Stein)
- 1995 McDonald's American Cup, Seattle, Wash.; 12th-AA (prelims.), 3rd(t)-UB
- 1995 Reese's International Gymnastics Cup, Portland, Ore.; 7th-BB
- 1994 Team World Championships, Dortmund, Germany; 2nd-Team
