= Georgia-Anastasia Tembou =

Greek gymnast (born 1980)

Personal information
- Nationality: Greek
- Born: 23 April 1980 (age 44); Thessaloniki, Greece

Sport
- Sport: Gymnastics

Georgia-Anastasia Tembou (born 23 April 1980) is a Greek gymnast. She competed in six events at the 1996 Summer Olympics.
