= Gabriela Krčmářová =

Czech gymnast

Personal information
- Nationality: Czech
- Born: 16 March 1978 (age 47); Karviná, Czechoslovakia

Sport
- Sport: Gymnastics

Gabriela Krčmářová (born 16 March 1978) is a Czech gymnast. She competed at the 1996 Summer Olympics.
