= Kyriaki Firinidou =

Greek gymnast (born 1980)

Personal information
- Nationality: Greek
- Born: 8 September 1980 (age 44); Thessaloniki, Greece

Sport
- Sport: Gymnastics

Kyriaki Firinidou (born 8 September 1980) is a Greek gymnast who competed at the 1996 Summer Olympics.
