= Gemma Paz =

Spanish gymnast

Personal information
- Nationality: Spanish
- Born: 18 August 1981 (age 43); Madrid, Spain

Sport
- Sport: Gymnastics

Gemma Paz (born 18 August 1981) is a Spanish gymnast. She competed in three events at the 1996 Summer Olympics.
