= Satsuki Obata =

Japanese gymnast (born 1977)

Personal information
- Nationality: Japanese
- Born: 24 May 1977 (age 49) Shiga, Japan

Sport
- Sport: Gymnastics
Medal record
Representing Japan
Asian Games
Silver medal – second place	1994 Hiroshima	Team

Satsuki Obata (小幡さつき, Obata Satsuki; born 24 May 1977) is a Japanese gymnast. She competed in four events at the 1996 Summer Olympics.
