= Orélie Troscompt =

French gymnast

Personal information
- Nationality: French
- Born: 28 May 1981 (age 44); Vevey, Switzerland

Sport
- Sport: Gymnastics

Orélie Troscompt (born 28 May 1981) is a French gymnast. She competed in four events in the artistic gymnastics category at the 1996 Summer Olympics in Atlanta, Georgia. She participated in floor exercise, horse vault, individual all-around, and team all-around.

Event	Results
Floor Exercise	#68 (r1/1)
Horse Vault	#79 (r1/1)
Individual all-around	#99 (r1/2)
Team all-around	#8
