= Qiao Ya =

Chinese artistic gymnast

Qiao Ya 乔娅
- Born: January 10, 1977 (age 49) Jingzhou, Hubei

Gymnastics career
- Discipline: Women's artistic gymnastics
- Country represented: China
- Retired: 1996
Medal record
Representing China
World Championships
Silver medal – second place	1995 Sabae	Team
Asian Games
Gold medal – first place	1994 Hiroshima	Team
Gold medal – first place	1994 Hiroshima	All-Around
Silver medal – second place	1994 Hiroshima	Balance Beam

Qiao Ya (simplified Chinese: 乔娅; traditional Chinese: 喬婭; pinyin: Qiáo Yà; born January 10, 1977, in Jingzhou, Hubei) is a retired Chinese artistic gymnast. She was the 1994 Asian Games All-Around Champion, a finalist on balance beam at the 1994 and 1995 World Gymnastics Championships, and competed at the 1996 Olympic Games in Atlanta – where she placed 11th in the individual All-Around and 4th with the team during Team Finals.

Despite a disappointing showing at the 1994 American Cup, Qiao began her international career on a high: beating her more widely known teammate, Mo Huilan, to the individual All-Around title at the 1994 Asian Games. At these championships Qiao also placed first with her team and finished with a silver medal on balance beam.

At the 1994 World Championships Qiao had moderate success – finishing 10th in the individual all-around and making the balance beam final. She qualified for the beam final in 4th place and was one of the favourites to challenge America's Shannon Miller for the title but took a fall during the final on her tumbling run (a back-handspring to two layout somersaults), and ultimately finished in 7th place.

In 1995 Qiao competed at the 1995 World Championships – where the team took second place behind 1994 World Champions Romania. The Chinese team actually scored the highest in the Team Optionals portion of the competition but their disappointing scores during the Compulsories round (where they were weak on vault and bars) prevented them from taking first place. During the team competition she did not compete on all four events and so did not qualify for the individual All-Around final. She did however qualify for the beam final (for the 2nd consecutive year) but a balance break at the beginning of the routine (a difficult round off to layout step-out mount onto the beam) resulted in an 8th-place finish.

Qiao also competed at the 1996 Summer Olympics. After their impressive showing at the 1995 Worlds many gymnastics fans and experts expected the Chinese to challenge the United States, Romania and Russia for the team title. However the team did not compete well during both the Compulsories and Team Optional exercises and finished the competition in 4th place, just ahead of Ukraine but a long way behind America (1st), Russia (2nd) and Romania (3rd). Qiao qualified for the all-around final in 29th place and ultimately finished 11th in that competition. Having scored a 9.725 on beam, a 9.675 on floor and 9.718 on vault she looked set to finish in the Top 8 but a disappointing set on bars (traditionally her weakest piece) where she scored only a 9.600 dropped her out of the Top 10 altogether.

Qiao retired from competitive gymnastics shortly after the 1996 Olympics and is now coaching in Singapore.

== Skills ==
- Vault – Yurchenko 1&1/2 (SV: 10.0 in 1993–1996 COP).
- Bars – Piked Jaegar to immediate Pak Salto, double front with 1/2 turn dismount.
- Beam – Round-off layout step-out mount, back-handspring layout step-out layout step-out, split jump into immediate punch front, full turning straddle jump, free walkover, various blind leaps.
- Floor – Full-twisting double back piked, 2.5 twist into punch front, 2.0 twisting front somersault
