= Diana Plaza =

Spanish gymnast

Personal information
- Nationality: Spanish
- Born: 12 June 1981 (age 45) Madrid, Spain

Sport
- Sport: Gymnastics
Medal record
Mediterranean Games
Bronze medal – third place	1997 Bari	Team

Diana Plaza (born 12 June 1981) is a Spanish gymnast. She competed at the 1996 Summer Olympics.
