= Kyriaki Papanikolaou =

Greek gymnast (born 1980)

Personal information
- Nationality: Greek
- Born: 28 February 1980 (age 45); Thessaloniki, Greece

Sport
- Sport: Gymnastics

Kyriaki Papanikolaou (born 28 February 1980) is a Greek gymnast. She competed in three events at the 1996 Summer Olympics.
