= Virginia Karentzou =

Greek gymnast (born 1978)

Personal information
- Nationality: Greek
- Born: 25 June 1978 (age 46); Thessaloniki, Greece

Sport
- Sport: Gymnastics

Virginia Karentzou (born 25 June 1978) is a Greek gymnast. She competed at the 1996 Summer Olympics.
