= Eileen Díaz =

Puerto Rican gymnast (born 1979)

Personal information
- Nationality: Puerto Rican
- Born: 1 November 1979 (age 46)

Sport
- Sport: Gymnastics

Eileen Díaz (born 1 November 1979) is a Puerto Rican gymnast. She competed in five events at the 1996 Summer Olympics. Díaz was selected to represent Puerto Rico in the gymnastics disciplines with the goal of increasing the profile of the sport within her home commonwealth. Diaz achieved 8th place within the all-around category in the 1995 American Cup.

Díaz is the first female gymnast to represent Puerto Rico at the Olympics and was the youngest Puerto Rican Olympian in history.

She placed first all-around at the Puerto Rican nationals, was second for vault at the Pan American Games, and first for uneven bars at Central American Games.
