= Laetitia Bégué =

Franco-Monegasque artistic gymnast

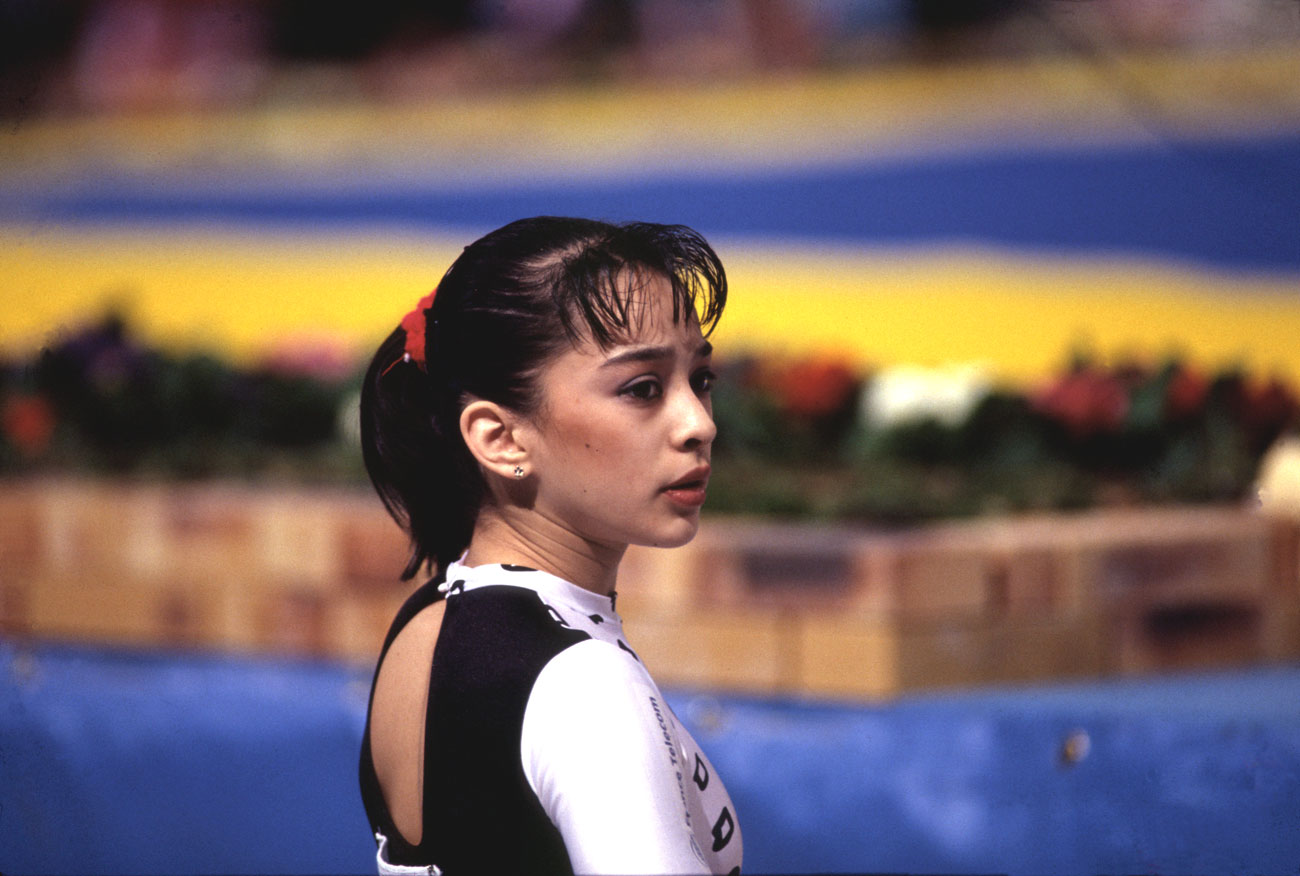
Laetitia Bégué

Laetitia Bégué (born 30 September 1980 in Monaco) is a Franco-Monegasque artistic gymnast who won the French Gymnastics Championships in 1994.
