= Francesca Morotti =

Italian gymnast

Personal information
- Nationality: Italian
- Born: 28 November 1979 (age 45); Calcinate, Italy

Sport
- Sport: Gymnastics

Francesca Morotti (born 28 November 1979) is an Italian former gymnast. She competed at the 1996 Summer Olympics.
