= Miho Hashiguchi =

Japanese gymnast (born 1977)

Personal information
- Nationality: Japanese
- Born: 29 December 1977 (age 48) Aichi, Japan

Sport
- Sport: Gymnastics
Medal record
Representing Japan
Asian Games
Silver medal – second place	1998 Bangkok	Team

Miho Hashiguchi (橋口美穂, Hashiguchi Miho; born 29 December 1977) is a Japanese gymnast. She competed at the 1996 Summer Olympics.

She is also noted to have won a bronze team medal and silver team medal at the Summer Universiade in 1997 and at the Asian Games respectively.
