= Jenny Smith (gymnast) =

Australian gymnast

Personal information
- Full name: Jennyfer Smith
- Nationality: Australian
- Born: 31 March 1980 (age 44); Perth, Western Australia

Sport
- Sport: Gymnastics

Jenny Smith (born 31 March 1980) is an Australian gymnast. She competed at the 1996 Summer Olympics.
