= Veselina Gencheva =

Bulgarian gymnast (born 1981)

Personal information
- Nationality: Bulgarian
- Born: 26 May 1981 (age 43); Sofia, Bulgaria

Sport
- Sport: Gymnastics

Veselina Gencheva (Bulgarian: Веселина Генчева) (born 26 May 1981) is a Bulgarian gymnast. She competed at the 1996 Summer Olympics.
