= Aikaterini Mamouti =

Greek gymnast (born 1981)

Personal information
- Nationality: Greek
- Born: 23 May 1981 (age 43); Thessaloniki, Greece

Sport
- Sport: Gymnastics

Aikaterini Mamouti (born 23 May 1981) is a Greek gymnast. She competed in six events at the 1996 Summer Olympics.
