= Aya Sekine =

Japanese gymnast (born 1978)

Personal information
- Nationality: Japanese
- Born: 12 April 1978 (age 48) Gunma, Japan

Sport
- Sport: Gymnastics
Medal record
Representing Japan
Asian Games
Silver medal – second place	1994 Hiroshima	Team

Aya Sekine (関根彩, Sekine Aya; born 12 April 1978) is a Japanese gymnast. She competed in six events at the 1996 Summer Olympics.
