= Diana Teixeira =

Portuguese gymnast (born 1981)

Personal information
- Nationality: Portuguese
- Born: 12 April 1981 (age 43); Porto, Portugal

Sport
- Sport: Gymnastics

Diana Teixeira (born 12 April 1981) is a Portuguese gymnast. She competed at the 1996 Summer Olympics.
