= Kong Yun-jin =

South Korean gymnast

Personal information
- Nationality: South Korean
- Born: 27 September 1981 (age 43); Seoul, South Korea

Sport
- Sport: Gymnastics

Kong Yun-jin (born 27 September 1981) is a South Korean gymnast. She competed at the 1996 Summer Olympics.
