= Naima El-Rhouati =

Moroccan gymnast

Personal information
- Nationality: Moroccan
- Born: 19 July 1976 (age 48)

Sport
- Sport: Gymnastics

Naima El-Rhouati (born 19 July 1976) is a Moroccan gymnast. She competed in five events at the 1996 Summer Olympics.
