= Masumi Okawa =

Japanese gymnast (born 1978)

Personal information
- Nationality: Japanese
- Born: 13 November 1978 (age 47) Shizuoka, Japan

Sport
- Sport: Gymnastics
Medal record
Representing Japan
Asian Games
Silver medal – second place	1994 Hiroshima	Team

Masumi Okawa (大川真澄, Ōkawa Masumi; born 13 November 1978) is a Japanese gymnast. She competed in five events at the 1996 Summer Olympics.
