= Ildikó Balog =

Hungarian gymnast

Personal information
- Nationality: Hungarian
- Born: 7 November 1977 (age 47); Békéscsaba, Hungary

Sport
- Sport: Gymnastics

Ildikó Balog (born 7 November 1977) is a Hungarian gymnast. She competed at the 1992 Summer Olympics and the 1996 Summer Olympics.
