= Lilia Podkopayeva =

Ukrainian gymnast (born 1978)

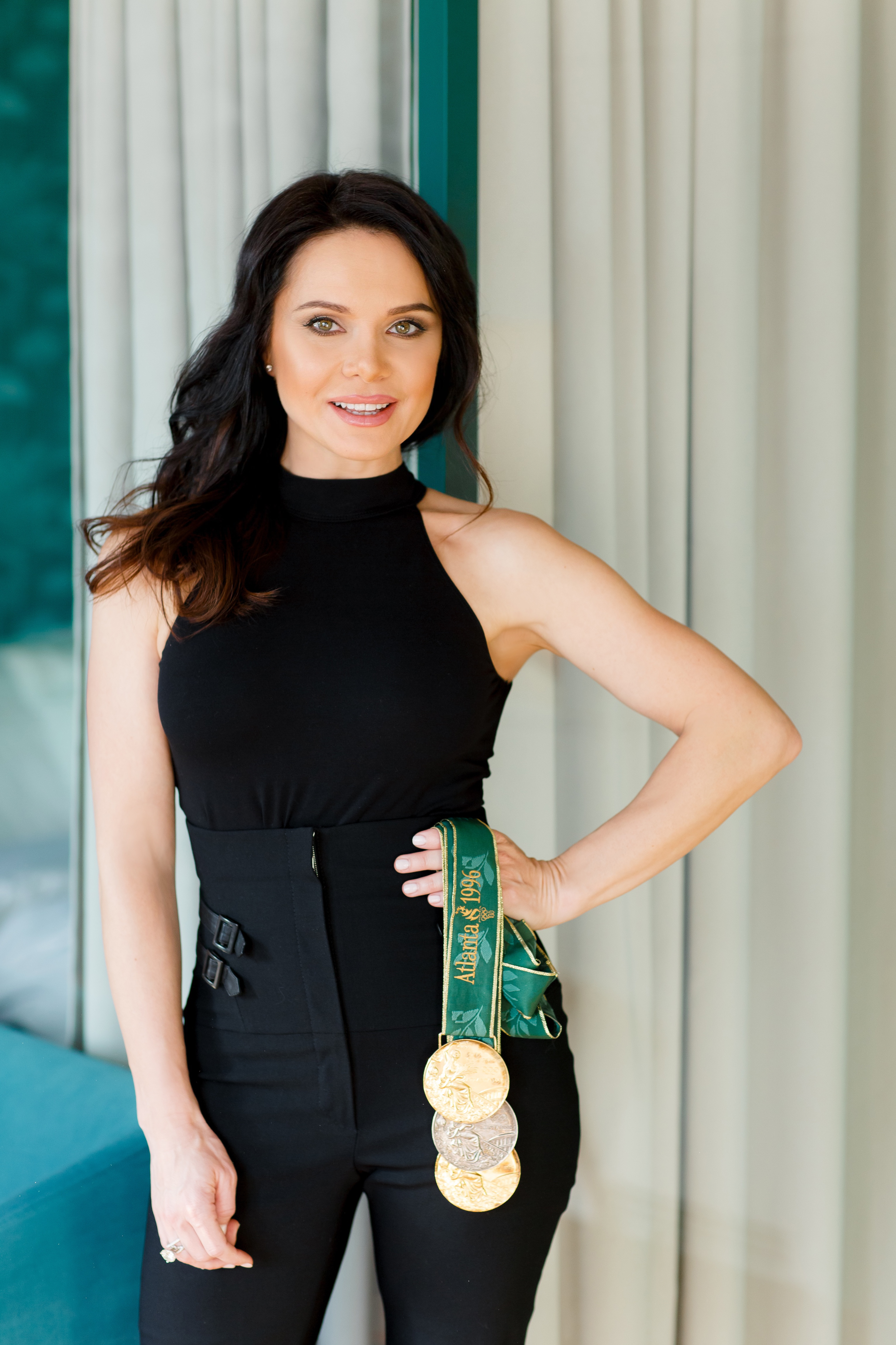
- Podkopayeva in 2021

Personal information
- Full name: Lilia Alexandrivna Podkopayeva
- Nicknames: LilyPod, Golden Lily (in Ukraine)
- Born: 15 August 1978 (age 48) Donetsk, Ukrainian SSR, Soviet Union
- Height: 1.49 m (4 ft 11 in)
- Spouse: Tymofiy Nahornyi (m. 2004; div. 2009)

Gymnastics career
- Discipline: Women's artistic gymnastics
- Country represented: Ukraine
- Club: Dynamo
- Head coaches: Polina Astakhova, Lilia Puhachova (Choreographer), Halyna Lozynska
- Eponymous skills: Vault round-off, back-handspring with 1/2 turn on - piked salto forward with 1/2 turn off Floor double front salto, also with 1/2 twist out
- Retired: 1997
Medal record
Representing Ukraine
Women's artistic gymnastics
Event	1st	2nd	3rd
Olympic Games	2	1	0
World Championships	2	3	0
Goodwill Games	2	0	2
European Championships	4	1	4
European Team Championships	0	0	1
European Cup Final	2	2	2
Total	12	7	9
Olympic Games
Gold medal – first place	1996 Atlanta	All-Around
Gold medal – first place	1996 Atlanta	Floor Exercise
Silver medal – second place	1996 Atlanta	Balance Beam
World Championships
Gold medal – first place	1995 Sabae	All-Around
Gold medal – first place	1995 Sabae	Vault
Silver medal – second place	1994 Brisbane	Balance Beam
Silver medal – second place	1995 Sabae	Balance Beam
Silver medal – second place	1995 Sabae	Uneven Bars
Goodwill Games
Gold medal – first place	1994 St Petersburg	Mixed Team
Gold medal – first place	1994 St Petersburg	Vault
Bronze medal – third place	1994 St Petersburg	Team
Bronze medal – third place	1994 St Petersburg	Floor Exercise
European Championships
Gold medal – first place	1994 Stockholm	Floor Exercise
Gold medal – first place	1996 Birmingham	All-Around
Gold medal – first place	1996 Birmingham	Uneven Bars
Gold medal – first place	1996 Birmingham	Floor Exercise
Silver medal – second place	1994 Stockholm	Balance Beam
Bronze medal – third place	1994 Stockholm	Team
Bronze medal – third place	1994 Stockholm	Vault
Bronze medal – third place	1996 Birmingham	Team
Bronze medal – third place	1996 Birmingham	Vault
European Team Championships
Bronze medal – third place	1997 Paris	Team
European Cup Final
Gold medal – first place	1995 Rome	Uneven Bars
Gold medal – first place	1995 Rome	Balance Beam
Silver medal – second place	1993 Brussels	Vault
Silver medal – second place	1995 Rome	Vault
Bronze medal – third place	1993 Brussels	Balance Beam
Bronze medal – third place	1995 Rome	Floor

Lilia Oleksandrivna Podkopayeva (Ukrainian: Лілія Олександрівна Подкопаєва; born 15 August 1978) is a Ukrainian former artistic gymnast. She is the 1995 world all-around champion, and the 1996 Olympic all-around and floor exercise champion. Often thought of as a complete athlete, Podkopayeva was known for combining power, style, and balletic grace.

== Gymnastics career ==
=== 1993–95 ===
In March 1993, Lilia won her only National All Around Title in Ukraine. In April 1993, Podkopayeva competed at the World Artistic Gymnastics Championships in Birmingham, England. She qualified for the vault final, but crashed on her first attempt and finished last with a score of 8.893.

At the 1994 World Championships in Brisbane, Australia, she placed sixth in the all-around with a score of 38.942. In event finals, she placed eighth on vault, scoring 9.424; fifth on uneven bars, scoring 9.350; and second on balance beam, scoring 9.737. In November 1994, at the World Team Championships in Dortmund, Germany, she contributed an all-around score of 38.099 toward the Ukrainian team's fifth-place finish.

The following year, Podkopayeva competed at the 1995 World Championships in Sabae, Japan. She helped Ukraine place fifth and qualify a full team to the 1996 Olympics. Podkopayeva then won the all-around final with a score of 39.248. In event finals, she placed first on vault (9.781), second on uneven bars (9.837), second on balance beam (9.837), and seventh on floor (9.087).

=== 1996 ===
At the beginning of the year, Podkopayeva was seriously injured when she fell from the beam in practice, fracturing two ribs. However, in May, she competed at the European Championships in Birmingham, where she helped the Ukrainian team place third and won the individual all-around with a score of 39.205. In event finals, she placed third on balance beam (9.756), first on uneven bars (9.825), and first on floor (9.862).

==== Atlanta Olympics ====
In July, Podkopayeva competed at the 1996 Summer Olympics in Atlanta, Georgia. In the team final, she contributed a combined compulsory and optional score of 78.061 toward the Ukrainian team's fifth-place finish. She then won the all-around final with a score of 39.255. In event finals, she placed fifth on uneven bars (9.787), second on balance beam (9.825), and first on floor (9.887). She was the fourth gymnast to win the Olympic all-around title as the reigning world champion, and the first gymnast to win the all-around without winning a team medal. She was also the last female gymnast to win the all-around title and an event-final gold medal until Simone Biles did this in 2016.

=== 1997 ===
Podkopayeva originally intended to continue competing after the 1996 Olympics, and she was named to the Ukrainian team for the 1997 World Championships. However, injuries forced her to sit out the competition and, later, to retire.

== Eponymous skills ==
Podkopayeva has two eponymous skills listed in the Code of Points.

Apparatus	Name	Description	Difficulty (Note: Valid for the 2025–2028 Code of Points)
Vault	Podkopayeva	Round-off flic-flac with 1/2 turn (180°) on - piked salto forward with 1/2 turn (180°) off	4.2
Floor exercise	Podkopayeva	Double salto forward tucked with 1/2 turn (180°)	F (0.6)

== Post-retirement ==
In 2002, Podkopayeva started the Golden Lilia International Sports Festival, an exhibition featuring artistic and rhythmic gymnasts, acrobats, and dancers. She said, "It's important to us to show outstanding people and brightest talent so that the next generation can follow the best of the best."

In December 2004, she married a Ukrainian businessman Tymofiy Nahornyi. They have two children: Vadym, adopted in Ukraine in July 2006, and Karolina, born in November 2006. The couple divorced in 2009.

In 2005, Podkopayeva became a United Nations goodwill ambassador on HIV/AIDS in Ukraine. She is also an Ambassador of the Council of Europe for Sport, Tolerance, and Fair Play.

In 2007, she won Ukraine's Dancing With the Stars with partner Sergiy Kostetskyi. The next year, she represented Ukraine in the Eurovision Dance Contest. Along with partner Kyrylo Khytrov, she placed third in the competition.

In 2014, Podkopayeva did a gala event in Mexico, using similar choreography to the floor routine she performed in Atlanta, as well as doing back handsprings and round-offs.

In 2019, Podkopayeva joined the coaching staff at Marcus Jewish Community Center of Atlanta's Perimeter Gymnastics.

== See also ==
- List of Olympic female gymnasts for Ukraine
