= Olena Shaparna =

Ukrainian artistic gymnast (born 1979)

- Full name: Olena Mykolaivna Shaparna
- Born: February 4, 1979 (age 47) Kherson, Ukraine
- Height: 159 cm (5 ft 3 in)

Gymnastics career
- Discipline: Women's artistic gymnastics
- Country represented: Ukraine
- Club: Dynamo Kherson

Olena Mykolaivna Shaparna (born 4 February 1979) is a Ukrainian former artistic gymnast. She competed at the 1996 Summer Olympics.

== See also ==
- List of Olympic female gymnasts for Ukraine
