= Mao Yanling =

Chinese gymnast

Personal information
- Nationality: Chinese
- Born: 24 February 1980 (age 45)

Sport
- Sport: Gymnastics

Mao Yanling (born 24 February 1980) is a Chinese former gymnast. She competed at the 1996 Summer Olympics, where she finished 19th in the individual all around.
