= Adrienn Nyeste =

Hungarian gymnast

Personal information
- Nationality: Hungarian
- Born: 14 December 1978 (age 46); Mezőhegyes, Hungary

Sport
- Sport: Gymnastics

Adrienn Nyeste (born 14 December 1978) is a former Hungarian gymnast. She competed at the 1996 Summer Olympics and the 2000 Summer Olympics.

== Eponymous skill ==
Nyeste has an uneven bars release move named after her in the Code of Points.

Apparatus	Name	Description	Difficulty (Note: Valid for the 2025–2028 Code of Points)
Uneven bars	Nyeste	Swing forward and salto backward with ½ turn (180°) straddle-piked	D (0.4)
