= Nicole Kantek =

Australian gymnast

Personal information
- Nationality: Australian
- Born: 6 July 1981 (age 43); Liverpool, New South Wales, Australia

Sport
- Sport: Gymnastics

Nicole Kantek (born 6 July 1981) is an Australian gymnast. She competed in six events at the 1996 Summer Olympics.
