= Laure Gély =

French gymnast (born 1979)

Personal information
- Nationality: French
- Born: 5 February 1979 (age 47) Saint-Étienne, France

Sport
- Sport: Gymnastics
Medal record
Representing France
Mediterranean Games
Gold medal – first place	1997 Bari	Team

Laure Gély (born 5 February 1979) is a French former gymnast. She competed in four events at the 1996 Summer Olympics. She also won the gold medal with the French team at the 1997 Mediterranean Games.
