= Tatyana Zharganova =

Belarusian gymnast (born 1980)

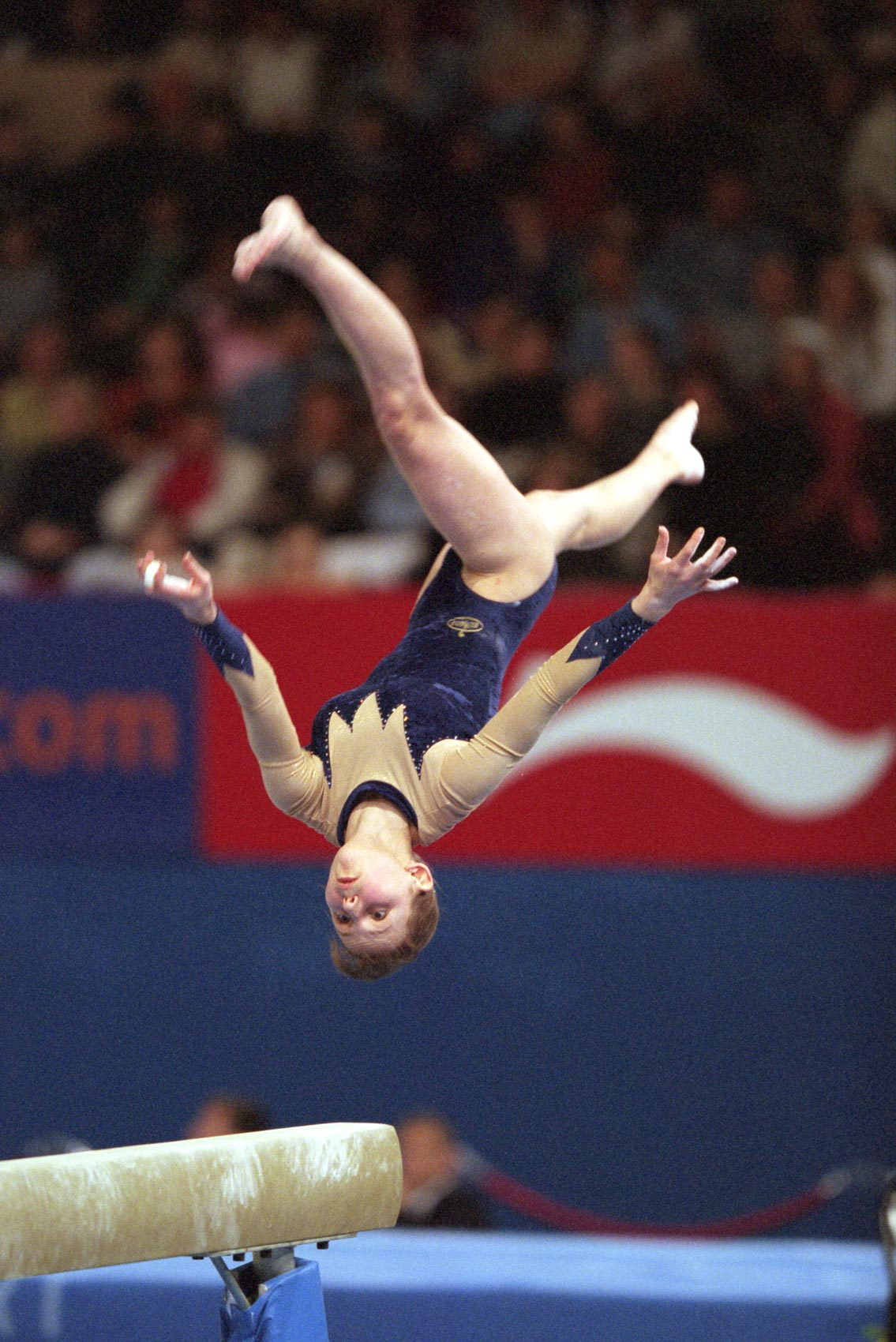

Personal information
- Nationality: Belarusian
- Born: 24 July 1980 (age 45); Grodno, Byelorussian SSR, Soviet Union

Sport
- Sport: Gymnastics

Tatyana Zharganova (born 24 July 1980) is a Belarusian gymnast. She competed at the 1996 Summer Olympics and the 2000 Summer Olympics.
