= Hanako Miura =

Japanese artistic gymnast

Personal information
- Nationality: Japanese
- Born: 28 March 1975 (age 51) Hiroshima, Japan

Sport
- Sport: Gymnastics
Medal record
Representing Japan
Asian Games
Silver medal – second place	1994 Hiroshima	Team

Hanako Miura (三浦華子, Miura Hanako; born 28 March 1975) is a Japanese gymnast. She competed at the 1992 Summer Olympics and the 1996 Summer Olympics.
