= Pascale Grossenbacher =

Swiss artistic gymnast (born 1978)

Pascale Grossenbacher (born 27 May 1978) is a Swiss former artistic gymnast. She competed at the 1996 Summer Olympics.
