= Naho Hoshiyama =

Japanese gymnast

Personal information
- Nationality: Japanese
- Born: 25 December 1980 (age 44); Tokyo, Japan

Sport
- Sport: Gymnastics

Naho Hoshiyama (星山菜穂, Hoshiyama Naho, born 25 December 1980) is a Japanese gymnast. She competed in six events at the 1996 Summer Olympics.
