= Verónica Castro (gymnast) =

Spanish gymnast

Personal information
- Nationality: Spanish
- Born: 26 June 1979 (age 45); Gijón, Spain

Sport
- Sport: Gymnastics

Verónica Castro (born 26 June 1979) is a Spanish gymnast. She competed in six events at the 1996 Summer Olympics.
