= Lisa Moro =

Australian gymnast

Personal information
- Nationality: Australian
- Born: 22 June 1981 (age 43); Melbourne, Australia

Sport
- Sport: Gymnastics

Lisa Moro (born 22 June 1981) is an Australian gymnast. She competed in six events at the 1996 Summer Olympics.
