= Joanna Hughes =

Australian gymnast

Personal information
- Nationality: Australian
- Born: 22 December 1977 (age 48) Melbourne, Australia

Sport
- Sport: Gymnastics
Medal record
Representing Australia
Commonwealth Games
Bronze medal – third place	1994 Victoria	Team

Joanna Hughes (born 22 December 1977) is an Australian gymnast. She competed at the 1996 Summer Olympics, where she finished 34th in the individual all around.
