= Mo Huilan =

Chinese gymnast (born 1979)

- Full name: Mo Huilan
- Nicknames: "China's Little Angel" "Mighty Mo"
- Born: 19 July 1979 (age 47) Guilin, Guangxi
- Height: 150 cm (4 ft 11 in)

Gymnastics career
- Discipline: Women's artistic gymnastics
- Country represented: China (1993–1997)
- Club: Guilin Gym. School
- Head coach: Zijuan Yuan
- Eponymous skills: "Mo Salto" (uneven bars)
- Retired: 1997
Medal record
Women's gymnastics
Representing China
Olympic Games
| Silver medal – second place | 1996 Atlanta | Vault |
World Championships
| Gold medal – first place | 1995 Sabae | Balance Beam |
| Silver medal – second place | 1995 Sabae | Team |
| Silver medal – second place | 1995 Sabae | Uneven Bars |
| Bronze medal – third place | 1997 Lausanne | Team |
Asian Games
| Gold medal – first place | 1994 Hiroshima | Team |
| Gold medal – first place | 1994 Hiroshima | Vault |
| Gold medal – first place | 1994 Hiroshima | Uneven Bars |
| Gold medal – first place | 1994 Hiroshima | Balance Beam |
| Gold medal – first place | 1994 Hiroshima | Floor Exercise |
| Bronze medal – third place | 1994 Hiroshima | All-Around |

Mo Huilan (simplified Chinese: 莫慧兰; traditional Chinese: 莫慧蘭; pinyin: Mò Huìlán; born 19 July 1979 in Guilin, Guangxi) is a retired Chinese gymnast who competed at the 1996 Olympic Games in Atlanta. She was one of China's most successful gymnasts in the 1990s. She was known for performing routines of exceptional difficulty and technique, but also for inconsistency.

Her birth date has been reported in various events as July 19 and November 7; it is unclear which is correct. She is a fraternal twin; her sister Mo Huifang was also a gymnast.

== Gymnastics career ==
Both Huilan and Huifang began gymnastics in 1985 in Guangxi. In 1990, they were invited to attend a camp in Beijing to test for admission to the Chinese national training center. Huifang was accepted, but Huilan was not. Showing determination that would serve her well in her competitive career, she talked coaches into allowing her to remain in Beijing with her sister. Eventually, Huifang was injured and retired from gymnastics; Huilan, in contrast, thrived and improved.

Mo made her international debut at the 1993 Cottbus Cup, where she placed a modest sixth in the all-around. The next year at the Asian Games, however, she nearly swept the competition with gold medals in the team, balance beam, uneven bars, and vault and a bronze in the all-around.

She came to the attention of the international gymnastics community at the 1994 World Championships in Brisbane, Australia, where she achieved a seventh-place finish in the all-around final, the highest of any Chinese gymnast. Although she placed out of the medals on floor exercise, her routine, which was choreographed to Leroy Anderson's "Typewriter Song", was a hit with the audience. Her performance on the uneven bars, where she debuted her own version of the Gaylord salto, also gained recognition and appreciation. Mo was the first female to perform this skill, a front tuck over the bar to recatch.

At the 1995 World Championships in Sabae, she showed an increased level of difficulty on all events, including a double-twisting Yurchenko vault, a double layout on floor exercise and beam routine highlighted by a dynamic two-foot layout and blind double stag leaps. Her team won the silver medal for China in the team competition, their highest finish since 1981. Her preliminary scores qualified her to all four event finals and the highest qualification score for the all-around final. She would only finish sixth in the final due to a fall from the balance beam in the first rotation. She went on to win the balance beam title and tied for the silver medal on the uneven bars with all around champion Lilia Podkopayeva behind eventual Olympic champion Svetlana Khorkina.

Mo was expected to be a major medal contender at the 1996 Olympics. However, the competition would prove to be disappointing for the entire Chinese team. Errors in the preliminary round kept her from qualifying for the beam and bars event finals, which were arguably her best events. Mistakes and falls from several of her teammates kept the Chinese squad from earning a medal in the team competition altogether. In the all-around, She performed well on her first three rotations: vault, uneven bars and balance beam to lead the competition going into the final rotation, but stepped out of bounds on floor exercise and dropped to fifth place. She went on to win a silver medal on vault behind Romanian Simona Amânar, the first Chinese female gymnast to win a medal on vault at the Olympic/World Championship level.

After the 1996 Olympics, she participated in exhibitions and shows in the United States before returning to training. She continued to compete through the 1997 season. However, struggling with her fitness and increased demands for difficulty with a new Code of Points, she quietly retired from gymnastics at the end of 1997.

== Life after gymnastics ==
By all accounts, Mo's life after gymnastics has been fruitful. She has enjoyed status as a celebrity in China, where she is recognized as one of the country's most beloved sports figures. She pursued her education at Renmin University of China in Beijing and subsequently began a career as a sports journalist and commentator. She has also tried her hand at modeling and has a contract with the Li Ning company. She portrayed former teammate Sang Lan in a television miniseries.

== Skills ==
Mo's style was noted for its excellent form, extension, and difficulty. She also frequently used cheeky choreography on the floor. On the uneven bars, she was the first woman to perform a Gaylord, a front flip over the high bar. This skill is now known as the "Mo Salto" or officially the Mo on uneven bars in the Code of Points, and is classified as a "G" element. Only a handful of other women gymnasts have attempted and successfully completed the Mo Salto. In fact, the only women gymnasts who have performed the "Mo Salto" at international competitions are all from China, including Meng Fei and Bi Wenjing. In 2005 World Championships, Chinese athlete Zhang Yufei performed it successfully in podium training. However, she was injured during the vault qualification, thus she did not use this skill during bars qualification. In 2013 World Championships, Yao Jinnan also successfully performed a Mo Salto during the all-around competition (but did not successful grasp the high bar attempting this in the event final). Another Chinese athlete, the relatively unknown Zhou Duan, performed the even harder Gaylord II (front flip with half twist over the high bar) at the 1997 East Asian Games.

Mo has performed the following elements in competition:

- Vault: Piked barani, 1½ twisting and double twisting Yurchenko
- Uneven bars: "Mo salto", inverted giants, Tkatchev, double layout
- Balance beam: one-arm handstand mount, roundoff—layout to two feet, switch leap—double stag ring leap—back dive ¼ turn to handstand, front aerial, round off—back handspring—double tuck dismount
- Floor: double layout, piked full-in, whip—whip—double twist, 2½ twist—punch front tuck, laid out Rudi, laid out front full—punch front tuck

Her music for floor routines was:

- 1994-1995: "The Typewriter" by Leroy Anderson
- 1996: "Yellow River Piano Concerto" by Yin Chengzong

=== Eponymous skill ===
| Apparatus | Name | Description | Difficulty (Note: Valid for the 2025-2028 Code of Points) |
|---|---|---|---|
| Uneven bars | Mo (Mo Salto) | Swing backward salto forward tucked over high bar to hang on high bar | G (0.7) |
