= Lyudmila Vityukova =

Belarusian gymnast (born 1978)

Personal information
- Nationality: Belarusian
- Born: 12 October 1978 (age 46); Babruysk, Byelorussian SSR, Soviet Union

Sport
- Sport: Gymnastics

Lyudmila Vityukova (born 12 October 1978) is a Belarusian gymnast. She competed in five events at the 1996 Summer Olympics.
