= Asian Artistic Gymnastics Championships – Men's floor =

The Asian Artistic Gymnastics Championships were first held in 1996.

Three medals are awarded: gold for first place, silver for second place, and bronze for third place.

== Medalists ==
Year	Location	Gold	Silver	Bronze
1996	(China) Changsha	(China) Shen Jian	(China) Fan Hongbin	(Kazakhstan) Sergey Fedorchenko
2003	(China) Guangzhou	(Kazakhstan) Yernar Yerimbetov	(South Korea) Yang Tae-young	(Yemen) Nashwan Al-Harazi
2006	(India) Surat	(North Korea) Ri Jong-song (China) Zou Kai	Not awarded	(Syria) Fadi Bahlawan (India) Ashish Kumar
2008	(Qatar) Doha	(South Korea) Kim Soo-myun	(Japan) Koji Yamamuro	(South Korea) Ha Chang-ju
2012	(China) Putian	(Japan) Kenzō Shirai	(South Korea) Kim Han-sol	(South Korea) Lee Jun-ho
2015	(Japan) Hiroshima	(Japan) Kenzō Shirai	(Japan) Naoto Hayasaka	(Uzbekistan) Eduard Shaulov
2017	(Thailand) Bangkok	(China) Lin Chaopan	(China) Xiao Ruoteng	(South Korea) Kim Han-sol
2019	(Mongolia) Ulaanbaatar	(China) Yang Jiaxing	(Kazakhstan) Milad Karimi	(Japan) Daisuke Fudono
2022	(Qatar) Doha	(Philippines) Carlos Yulo	(South Korea) Kim Han-sol	(China) Yang Jiaxing
2023	Singapore	(Philippines) Carlos Yulo	(Kazakhstan) Dmitriy Patanin	(China) Su Weide
2024	(Uzbekistan) Tashkent	(Philippines) Carlos Yulo	(Kazakhstan) Milad Karimi	(China) Yang Yanzhi
2025	(South Korea) Jecheon	(Philippines) Carlos Yulo	(Kazakhstan) Milad Karimi	(South Korea) Moon Geon-young
2026	(China) Zunyi	(Philippines) Carlos Yulo	(Japan) Shoma Tsukiyama	(Philippines) Eldrew Yulo

== Medal table ==
Rank	Nation	Gold	Silver	Bronze	Total
1	Philippines (PHI)	5	0	1	6
2	China (CHN)	4	2	3	9
3	Japan (JPN)	2	3	1	6
4	Kazakhstan (KAZ)	1	4	1	6
5	South Korea (KOR)	1	3	4	8
6	North Korea (PRK)	1	0	0	1
7	India (IND)	0	0	1	1
7	Syria (SYR)	0	0	1	1
7	Uzbekistan (UZB)	0	0	1	1
7	Yemen (YEM)	0	0	1	1
Totals (10 entries)		14	12	14	40
