= Ukraine at the Goodwill Games =

- IOC code: UKR
- NOC: National Olympic Committee of Ukraine
- Medals: Gold 16 Silver 17 Bronze 23 Total 56

Summer appearances
- 1994; 1998; 2001

Ukraine first participated at the Goodwill Games as an independent nation in 1994, and sent athletes to compete in every Summer Goodwill Games after that.

== Medal tables ==
| Games | Athletes | Gold | Silver | Bronze | Total | Rank |
|---|---|---|---|---|---|---|
| 1986–1990 | as part of the Soviet Union | | | | | |
| (Russia) 1994 Saint Petersburg | - | 8 | 3 | 11 | 22 | 6 |
| (United States) 1998 New York | - | 1 | 5 | 4 | 10 | 14 |
| (Australia) 2001 Brisbane | - | 4 | 9 | 8 | 21 | 8 |
