= Vanessa Atler =

American artistic gymnast

- Full name: Vanessa Marie Atler
- Nicknames: Ness, Nessa
- Born: February 17, 1982 (age 44) Santa Clarita, California, U.S.

Gymnastics career
- Discipline: Women's artistic gymnastics
- Country represented: United States; (1994–2000 (USA))
- Club: Charter Oak Gliders; Rohnert Park Gymnastics; WOGA; AV Twisters; Gymnastics Unlimited; Aerials
- Former coaches: Steve and Beth Rybacki; Ben Corr; Valeri Liukin and Yevgeny Marchenko; Tony Lanzara
- Choreographer: Nancy Roach; Beth Rybacki; Natalya Marakova
- Music: 1995-1996: Phil's Piano Solo; 1997-1998: Jack's Conga; 1998-1999: La Cumparsita; 2000: Les Deux Guitares
- Retired: April 16, 2001
Medal record
Representing United States
Goodwill Games
Gold medal – first place	New York 1998	Floor
Gold medal – first place	New York 1998	Vault
Pacific Alliance Championships
Gold medal – first place	Christchurch 2000	Team
Gold medal – first place	Winnipeg 1998	Floor
Gold medal – first place	Winnipeg 1998	Team
Gold medal – first place	Winnipeg 1998	Vault
Bronze medal – third place	Christchurch 2000	Vault
International Team Championship
Gold medal – first place	Knoxville 1998	Team
Silver medal – second place	Cincinnati 1997	Team
Silver medal – second place	Cincinnati 1997	Vault
Silver medal – second place	Knoxville 1998	Balance Beam

Vanessa Marie Atler (born February 17, 1982) is an American former elite gymnast. She is the 1997 U.S. national all-around champion, the 1998 Goodwill Games gold medalist on the floor exercise and vault, and a four-time national champion in the individual events of vault, balance beam, and floor exercise. She is also the 1996 junior national all-around and floor champion. At the 1999 American Cup, Atler became the first female gymnast to successfully perform a Rudi vault.

A member of the U.S. national gymnastics team from the age of 12, Atler was one of America's most successful and talented gymnasts in the late 1990s. Known for her explosive vaults, difficult tumbling skills and charismatic personality, she won or medaled in several important meets, and was considered to be one of the front-runners for the 2000 Olympics. However, injuries, coaching conflicts, gym changes, mental breakdowns and bulimia symptoms derailed her progress in 1999 and 2000, and after a poor showing at the 2000 Olympic Trials, she was controversially left off the Olympic team despite placing sixth overall.

== Early career ==
Atler was born on February 17, 1982, in the Valencia neighborhood of Santa Clarita, California, and began gymnastics at age 5. She has a brother who played baseball, her mother was a tennis instructor, and one of her cousins had been a Minnesota Vikings quarterback. At age 11, she began training at Charter Oak Gliders in Covina, California, and was coached by Beth Kline-Rybacki and Steve Rybacki. By the time she was 12 years old, she was competing at the elite level.

=== 1995 season ===
As a junior elite gymnast, Atler had a fruitful career. In 1995, she gained attention by placing third in the all-around, behind Olympian Kerri Strug and Heather Brink, at the U.S. Olympic Festival. She also won a gold medal on beam and a silver medal on floor. She went on to win the silver medal in the all-around at that year's U.S. National Championships.

Atler also made her international competitive debut in 1995, winning the floor exercise title at the prestigious International Junior Gymnastics Competition in Japan.

=== 1996 season: Junior National Champion ===
In February, Atler won the junior all-around title at the American Classic. In June at the U.S. National Championships, she became the junior national champion in the all-around and the floor exercise. She was invited to participate in a televised exhibition meet, USA vs. the World, with members of the Magnificent Seven and international Olympians.

With her February 1982 birth date, Atler missed the age cutoff for senior competition—which would have given her a chance to compete for a spot on the 1996 Olympic team—by only six weeks. In 1997, she found herself shut out of senior international competition once again, as the FIG raised the age limit from fifteen to sixteen.

=== 1997 season: Senior National Champion ===
Atler competed well in 1997, participating in both junior events and senior meets that were not bound by the FIG's new age restrictions. She placed second all-around at the 1997 American Cup and won event titles on vault and beam. In August at the 1997 U.S. National Championships, she won the national all-around title in a tie with Kristy Powell. At that same competition, she also won the vault title and the bronze medal on uneven bars. She went on to win the all-around title at the 1997 Canberra Cup in Australia, an important meet for junior international gymnasts.

During that same year, Atler began to experience problems on the uneven bars. On the second day of U.S. Nationals, a fall from bars kept her from winning the all-around title outright. This marked the beginning of a string of competitions in which she suffered unusual mistakes and misses on bars. In her online diary, she once referred to the bars as "the devil--testing my will and my patience, even my love for the sport." Over the next few years, bars would become a mental block for the young athlete who regularly struggled to put together a mistake-free routine in the heat of competition. Atler's main issue on bars involved a release move called a Comaneci salto, which she fell on at three consecutive National Championships from 1997 to 1999. This led to persistent questioning as to whether the Comaneci should have been removed from her bar routine despite the fact that she did complete the skill successfully on occasion.

== Senior international career ==
=== 1998 season: 2-time Goodwill Games Champion ===
In 1998, Atler was finally age-eligible for major senior international competition. In March at the American Cup, a fall from bars cost her the all-around title and she placed fourth all-around. In event finals at the same competition, she won the vault title and placed third on bars with a hit routine.

In July at the 1998 Goodwill Games, Atler was chosen to compete on floor exercise and vault, her two strongest apparatus. She won the gold medal on both events, defeating a field of Olympic and World medalists. In August at the 1998 U.S. National Championships, she won the all-around silver medal, as well as the gold medal on floor and the silver medal on vault. A disastrous 8.225 on bars during the first night of competition cost her a chance to defend her all-around title, but she rebounded well on the second day and received a 9.8 for her hit bar routine.

In November, Atler won the Australia Cup all-around title with a strong performance on every event. She also won the vault and floor titles. In December, she continued to gain momentum at the 1998 Copa Gimnastica competition in Mexico City, where she once again delivered strong routines on all four events and won the all-around bronze medal in a deep field behind Viktoria Karpenko and Simona Amânar. She also won the gold medal on vault, defeating Amanar, just as she had done at the Goodwill Games.

=== 1999 season ===
Atler began her 1999 season in February with a strong showing at the American Classic, where she won the all-around title by a large margin with top quality routines on every apparatus. In March at the American Cup, she became the first American woman to successfully complete a Rudi vault in competition. She won the event title on that event, as well as the beam and floor titles. Despite falling off bars in Preliminaries, she placed first all-around in that round of competition. During Finals, her routines were extremely strong on three events, but she fell off bars once again, which cost her the title and dropped her to third all-around.

Shortly thereafter, at the Paris-Bercy competition in France, Atler won the silver medal in a strong all-around field behind Svetlana Khorkina and also won the vault gold medal. During the floor exercise event final, she severely injured her ankle when she landed her double layout-punch front opening tumbling pass out-of-bounds. The out-of-bounds area of this particular floor mat lacked the proper spring and safety protection required. Atler recovered in time to compete at the 1999 U.S. National Championships, where she won the silver medal in the all-around behind Kristen Maloney. She was leading the competition going into the final rotation, but a fall from bars cost her the title. She went on to win the gold medal on vault and beam in Event Finals.

Following the U.S. National Championships, Atler left her longtime coaches at Charter Oak gymnastics club, Steve and Beth Rybacki. She was coached by Artur Akopyan at a local California gym as she prepared to compete at the U.S. World Team Trials and World Championships. She was, however, too injured to compete at the World Team Trials, and was petitioned onto the team based on the strength of her scores at 1999 Nationals, alongside Kristen Maloney and Jennie Thompson who were also suffering from injuries.

In October at the 1999 World Championships in Tianjin, China, Atler was out of competitive shape and unprepared for the competition, but she still did well enough to qualify to the All-Around Final in 7th place, the top U.S. qualifier. She also qualified for the Floor Final and was to replace Kristen Maloney (who pulled out of the final due to an injury) in the Beam Final. In the Team Final, she had some uncharacteristic errors and scored an 8.025 on beam after counting two falls. The team placed 6th, but after the Chinese team was disqualified due to falsifying Dong Fangxiao's age, the U.S. team ranking was moved to 5th. Struggling with her ankle injury that was progressively getting worse, she placed 31st in the all-around after ending her floor routine with a basic layout tumbling pass. She then withdrew from both of her event finals.

After the 1999 World Championships, Atler had two surgeries to repair the injured ankle that had plagued her throughout most of 1999. During that same time, she moved from California to Texas to train with 1988 Olympic champion Valeri Liukin at the World Olympic Gymnastics Academy (WOGA).

=== 2000 season ===
In 2000 after her injury layoff, Atler returned to form in July at the U.S. Classic, where she won the all-around title. Later that month at the 2000 U.S. National Championships, she finished fourth in the all-around, a respectable finish after a lengthy injury recovery, which set her up well for an Olympic berth. She also won the silver medal on vault and the bronze medal on floor.

At the 2000 Olympic Trials a few weeks later, Atler experienced what many considered a meltdown. She was unable to hit even one solid routine over the two days of competition, and botched moves that she usually performed well, changing her second vault in mid-air during both days, modifying her second tumbling pass on floor during the first day, and falling on her back on her beam dismount during the first day. As a result, the Olympic Selection Committee opted to leave her completely off the U.S. Olympic Team. However, even with several significant mistakes, Atler managed to place sixth at Trials and was still widely regarded as one of the United States's best gymnasts, causing some to argue that she had earned a spot on the team and to question the fairness of the selection process. Six athletes were named to the team as well as two alternates.

== After 2000 ==
Atler participated in the T.J. Maxx post-Olympics exhibition tour. In 2001, she trained briefly at Rohnert Park Gymnastics, but announced her retirement in April. In 2005, she appeared on the television show Starting Over, where she discussed some of the self-esteem and confidence issues that had arisen from her struggles in gymnastics. In multiple interviews in subsequent years, Atler expressed regret over leaving the Rybackis in 1999 and over not having better communication with them during that time. She returned to them in 2003 in a brief attempt at a comeback.

== Post-competitive gymnastics career ==
Atler formerly worked as a coach and is the girls team director at American Kids Sports Center in Bakersfield, California. She is married and has two children, a son born in January 2014 and a daughter born in February 2018. She continues to be in the gymnastics world and has since relocated to directing and coaching girls team at Central Coast Gymnastics in San Luis Obispo, California.

== Skills ==
Vault: Laidout Rudi (first female ever to compete this); Double Twisting Yurchenko; Laidout Cuervo; Handspring Laidout Front.

Floor: Double Layout + Punch Front + Stag Jump in combination; Whip + Double Pike; Triple Twist; Whip Half + Front Layout Double Full; Double Front Tuck; Two and a Half Twist + Front Layout; Full-twisting Double Tuck.

Her floor music pieces were: Phil's Piano Solo by Terry Snyder in 1995 and 1996; Jack's Conga by Micheal Kamen in 1997 and 1998; La Cumparsita by Gerardo Matos Rodriguez in 1998 and 1999; and Les Deux Guitares by Paul Mauriat in 2000.

Balance Beam: Punch Front + Jump mount sequence; Layout to two feet; Switch Leap + Gainered Layout in combination; Piked Front + Jump in combination; Tucked Barani; Roundoff + Back Handspring + Double Tuck Dismount.

Uneven Bars: Giant One and a Half; Tkatchev; Comaneci Salto; Pak Salto; Full Twisting Double Layout Dismount.

== Appearances in other media ==
Atler was a stunt double for the Lifetime Television film Little Girls in Pretty Boxes in 1997. She also appeared in commercials for Reese's Peanut Butter Cups in 1999 and for the U.S Olympic Committee in 2000, in the Starting Over TV series in 2005 as well as in various made-for-TV gymnastics exhibitions such as the Reese's Cup in 1999 and 2000, the Rock'n'Roll Championships in 1997 and 1998 and "USA vs The World" in 1996.

== Competitive history ==
Year	Event	Team	AA	VT	UB	BB	FX
Junior
1994	U.S. Classic		3rd place, bronze medalist(s)				
1995	International Junior Championships		4	4		4	1st place, gold medalist(s)
1995	Catania Cup		5	2nd place, silver medalist(s)		4	3rd place, bronze medalist(s)
1995	American Classic		4				
1995	U.S. Championships		2nd place, silver medalist(s)				
1995	U.S. Olympic Festival		3rd place, bronze medalist(s)			1st place, gold medalist(s)	2nd place, silver medalist(s)
1996	Avignon International		9		2nd place, silver medalist(s)		5
1996	American Classic		1st place, gold medalist(s)				
1996	U.S. Championships		1st place, gold medalist(s)				
1997	Visa American Cup		2nd place, silver medalist(s)	1st place, gold medalist(s)		1st place, gold medalist(s)	
1997	Canberra Cup		1st place, gold medalist(s)	2nd place, silver medalist(s)	2nd place, silver medalist(s)		1st place, gold medalist(s)
1997	Foxsport Challenge	1st place, gold medalist(s)	2nd place, silver medalist(s)	2nd place, silver medalist(s)	1st place, gold medalist(s)	4	3rd place, bronze medalist(s)
1997	International Team Championships	2nd place, silver medalist(s)	4				
1997	U.S. Championships		1st place, gold medalist(s)				
1997	USA-AUS Dual Meet	1st place, gold medalist(s)	2nd place, silver medalist(s)				
Senior
1998	Australia Cup		1st place, gold medalist(s)	1st place, gold medalist(s)			
1998	Visa American Cup		4	1st place, gold medalist(s)			
1998	Copa Gimnastica		3rd place, bronze medalist(s)	1st place, gold medalist(s)		4	
1998	Goodwill Games			1st place, gold medalist(s)			1st place, gold medalist(s)
1998	International Team Championships	1st place, gold medalist(s)	6				
1998	Pacific Alliance Championships		5	1st place, gold medalist(s)			1st place, gold medalist(s)
1998	U.S. Championships		2nd place, silver medalist(s)				
1999	American Classic		1st place, gold medalist(s)	1st place, gold medalist(s)		1st place, gold medalist(s)	1st place, gold medalist(s)
1999	Visa American Cup		3rd place, bronze medalist(s)				
1999	French International		2nd place, silver medalist(s)	1st place, gold medalist(s)		5	5
1999	U.S. Championships		2nd place, silver medalist(s)	1st place, gold medalist(s)		1st place, gold medalist(s)	
1999	World Championships	5	31				
2000	American Classic		31				
2000	Pacific Alliance Championships			3rd place, bronze medalist(s)			
2000	U.S. Classic		1st place, gold medalist(s)				
2000	U.S. Championships		4				
2000	U.S. Olympic Trials		6				
