= Asian Artistic Gymnastics Championships – Men's individual all-around =

The Asian Artistic Gymnastics Championships were first held in 1996.

Three medals are awarded: gold for first place, silver for second place, and bronze for third place.

== Medalists ==
Year	Location	Gold	Silver	Bronze
1996	(China) Changsha	(China) Shen Jian	(China) Fan Hongbin	(China) Cheng Liang
2003	(China) Guangzhou	(China) Liang Fuliang	(China) Feng Jing	(China) Lu Bin
2006	(India) Surat	(China) Chen Yibing	(Japan) Tomoharu Sano	(Japan) Hiroaki Kusu
2008	(Qatar) Doha	(Japan) Koji Yamamuro	(Japan) Yosuke Hoshi	(South Korea) Kim Soo-myun
2012	(China) Putian	(China) Liu Rongbing	(China) Zhou Shixiong	(South Korea) Ko Ye-darm
2015	(Japan) Hiroshima	(Japan) Ryōhei Katō	(Japan) Yusuke Tanaka	(China) He Youxiao
2017	(Thailand) Bangkok	(China) Xiao Ruoteng	(China) Lin Chaopan	(South Korea) Park Min-soo
2019	(Mongolia) Ulaanbaatar	(Chinese Taipei) Lee Chih-kai	(China) Hu Xuwei	(China) Liu Rongbing
2022	(Qatar) Doha	(China) Shi Cong	(Philippines) Carlos Yulo	(China) Yang Jiaxing
2023	Singapore	(Japan) Shinnosuke Oka	(Philippines) Carlos Yulo	(Japan) Takeru Kitazono
2024	(Uzbekistan) Tashkent	(Philippines) Carlos Yulo	(Kazakhstan) Milad Karimi	(Uzbekistan) Abdulla Azimov
2025	(South Korea) Jecheon	(Japan) Shinnosuke Oka	(Japan) Tsuyoshi Hasegawa	(Philippines) Carlos Yulo
2026	(China) Zunyi	(China) Zhang Boheng	(China) Yang Haonan	(Japan) Teppei Miwa

== Medal table ==
Rank	Nation	Gold	Silver	Bronze	Total
1	China (CHN)	7	6	5	18
2	Japan (JPN)	4	4	3	11
3	Philippines (PHI)	1	2	1	4
4	Chinese Taipei (TPE)	1	0	0	1
5	Kazakhstan (KAZ)	0	1	0	1
6	South Korea (KOR)	0	0	3	3
7	Uzbekistan (UZB)	0	0	1	1
Totals (7 entries)		13	13	13	39
