= Gymnastics at the 1998 Goodwill Games =

- Venue: Nassau Veterans Memorial Coliseum
- Location: New York, United States

At the 1998 Goodwill Games, two different gymnastics disciplines were contested: artistic gymnastics and rhythmic gymnastics.

== Artistic Gymnastics ==
=== Medalists ===
Event	Gold	Silver	Bronze
Men
Individual all-around	(Belarus) Ivan Ivankov	(Russia) Alexei Bondarenko	(United States) Blaine Wilson
Floor	(Russia) Alexei Nemov	(United States) Jay Thorton	(Russia) Alexei Bondarenko
Pommel horse	(Russia) Nikolai Kryukov	(Russia) Alexei Bondarenko	(United States) Yewki Tomita
Rings	(United States) Chris LaMorte	(Belarus) Ivan Ivankov (Russia) Alexei Bondarenko	none awarded
Vault	(Kazakhstan) Sergei Fedorchenko	(Russia) Nikolay Kryukov	(Cuba) Eric López Rios
Parallel bars	(China) Huang Xu	(Belarus) Ivan Ivankov	(Russia) Alexei Bondarenko
High bar	(Belarus) Ivan Ivankov	(Russia) Alexei Nemov	(Kazakhstan) Sergei Fedorchenko
Women
Individual all-around	(United States) Dominique Moceanu	(Romania) Maria Olaru	(Romania) Simona Amânar
Vault	(United States) Vanessa Atler	(Russia) Elena Dolgopolova	(Romania) Simona Amânar
Uneven bars	(Russia) Svetlana Khorkina	(United States) Elise Ray	(Romania) Simona Amânar
Balance beam	(United States) Kristen Maloney	(Ukraine) Olga Teslenko	(Romania) Corina Ungureanu
Floor	(United States) Vanessa Atler	(Romania) Simona Amânar	(Romania) Corina Ungureanu
Mixed
Pairs	China; Ling Jie; Xu Huang	Russia; Svetlana Khorkina; Alexei Nemov	Russia; Anna Kovalyova; Alexei Bondarenko

== Rhythmic Gymnastics ==
=== Medalists ===
Event	Gold	Silver	Bronze
Individual
All-Around	Alina Kabaeva (RUS)	Elena Vitrichenko (UKR)	Evgenia Pavlina (BLR)
Hoop	Alina Kabaeva (RUS)	Evgenia Pavlina (BLR)	Elena Vitrichenko (UKR)
Rope	Elena Vitrichenko (UKR)	Alina Kabaeva (RUS)	Evgenia Pavlina (BLR)
Clubs	Alina Kabaeva (RUS)	Evgenia Pavlina (BLR)	Teodora Alexandrova (BUL)
Ribbon	Alina Kabaeva (RUS)	Evgenia Pavlina (BLR)	Teodora Alexandrova (BUL); Asel Mustafina (RUS)

== Details ==
=== Artistic Gymnastics ===
==== Men ====
===== Individual All-Around =====
Rank	Gymnast	Floor (gymnastics)	Pommel horse	Rings (gymnastics)	Vault (gymnastics)	Parallel bars	Horizontal bar	Total
1st place, gold medalist(s)	Ivan Ivankov (BLR)	9.300	9.650	9.750	9.450	9.775	9.575	57.500
2nd place, silver medalist(s)	Alexei Bondarenko (RUS)	8.950	9.300	9.625	9.575	9.775	9.475	56.700
3rd place, bronze medalist(s)	Blaine Wilson (USA)	9.375	9.200	9.725	9.650	9.675	8.950	56.575
4	Roman Zozulia (UKR)	9.100	9.375	9.700	9.575	9.250	9.450	56.450
5	Lu Yufu (CHN)	9.000	9.450	9.500	9.625	9.400	9.275	56.250
6	Naoya Tsukahara (JPN)	9.325	9.225	9.500	9.475	9.450	9.200	56.175
7	Alexei Nemov (RUS)	9.450	9.100	9.125	9.550	8.950	9.525	55.700
8	Huang Xu (CHN)	9.125	8.300	9.525	9.475	9.725	8.500	54.650
9	Sean Townsend (USA)	8.625	8.500	9.425	9.625	9.550	8.600	54.325
10	Eric López Ríos (CUB)	8.400	9.500	9.675	9.600	9.275	7.850	54.300
11	Yoshiaki Hatakeda (JPN)	8.550	9.350	8.300	8.700	9.200	9.250	53.350
12	Sergei Fedorchenko (KAZ)	0.000	8.100	8.725	9.150	8.675	3.200	37.850

===== Floor =====
Rank	Gymnast	Score
1st place, gold medalist(s)	Alexei Nemov (RUS)	9.725
2nd place, silver medalist(s)	Jay Thornton (USA)	9.550
3rd place, bronze medalist(s)	Alexei Bondarenko (RUS)	9.525
4	Sergei Fedorchenko (KAZ)	9.375
5	Aleksandr Shostak (BLR)	9.250
6	Lu Yufu (CHN)	9.000
7	Roman Zozulia (UKR)	8.925
8	Sean Townsend (USA)	8.450

===== Pommel Horse =====
Rank	Gymnast	Score
1st place, gold medalist(s)	Nikolai Kryukov (RUS)	9.650
2nd place, silver medalist(s)	Alexei Bondarenko (RUS)	9.625
3rd place, bronze medalist(s)	Yewki Tomita (USA)	9.375
4	Huang Xu (CHN)	9.325
4	Yoshiaki Hatakeda (JPN)	9.325
6	Lu Yufu (CHN)	9.000
7	Vasile Cioana (ROU)	8.250
8	Szilveszter Csollany (HUN)	7.850

===== Rings =====
Rank	Gymnast	Score
1st place, gold medalist(s)	Chris LaMorte (USA)	9.700
2nd place, silver medalist(s)	Ivan Ivankov (BLR)	9.675
2nd place, silver medalist(s)	Alexei Bondarenko (RUS)	9.675
4	Blaine Wilson (USA)	9.650
5	Szilveszter Csollany (HUN)	9.625
6	Huang Xu (CHN)	9.575
7	Roman Zozulia (UKR)	9.525
8	Dimosthenis Tampakos (GRE)	9.100

===== Vault =====
Rank	Gymnast	Score
1st place, gold medalist(s)	Sergei Fedorchenko (KAZ)	9.650
2nd place, silver medalist(s)	Nikolai Kryukov (RUS)	9.600
3rd place, bronze medalist(s)	Eric López Ríos (CUB)	9.575
4	Vasile Cioana (ROU)	9.562
5	Alexei Nemov (RUS)	9.487
6	Chris Young (USA)	9.450
7	Lu Yufu (CHN)	9.387
8	Sean Townsend (USA)	9.075

===== Parallel Bars =====
Rank	Gymnast	Score
1st place, gold medalist(s)	Huang Xu (CHN)	9.725
2nd place, silver medalist(s)	Ivan Ivankov (BLR)	9.700
3rd place, bronze medalist(s)	Alexei Bondarenko (RUS)	9.650
4	Trent Wells (USA)	9.600
5	Naoya Tsukahara (JPN)	9.550
6	Maxim Alyoshin (RUS)	9.400
7	Lu Yufu (CHN)	9.200
8	Sean Townsend (USA)	8.800

===== High Bar =====
Rank	Gymnast	Score
1st place, gold medalist(s)	Ivan Ivankov (BLR)	9.725
2nd place, silver medalist(s)	Alexei Nemov (RUS)	9.650
3rd place, bronze medalist(s)	Sergei Fedorchenko (KAZ)	9.525
4	Lu Yufu (CHN)	9.475
5	Yoshiaki Hatakeda (JPN)	9.450
6	Chris Young (USA)	9.025
7	Alexei Bondarenko (RUS)	8.900
8	Jani Tanskanen (FIN)	8.425

==== Women ====
===== Individual All-Around =====
Rank	Gymnast	Vault (gymnastics)	Uneven bars	Balance beam	Floor (gymnastics)	Total
1st place, gold medalist(s)	Dominique Moceanu (USA)	9.587	9.625	9.750	9.700	38.662
2nd place, silver medalist(s)	Maria Olaru (ROU)	9.550	9.550	9.625	9.250	37.975
3rd place, bronze medalist(s)	Simona Amânar (ROU)	9.600	9.425	9.150	9.675	37.850
4	Meng Fei (CHN)	9.237	9.500	9.600	9.500	37.837
5	Sierra Sapunar (USA)	9.012	9.575	9.525	9.475	37.587
6	Olga Teslenko (UKR)	9.025	9.600	9.425	9.425	37.475
7	Svetlana Khorkina (RUS)	9.487	9.800	9.300	8.825	37.412
8	Zeena McLaughlin (AUS)	9.262	9.250	9.400	9.300	37.212
8	Ling Jie (CHN)	9.237	9.800	8.650	9.525	37.212
10	Elena Produnova (RUS)	9.375	9.400	9.050	8.950	36.775
11	Alena Polozkova (BLR)	9.325	8.550	9.175	9.500	36.550

===== Vault =====
Rank	Gymnast	Score
1st place, gold medalist(s)	Vanessa Atler (USA)	9.662
2nd place, silver medalist(s)	Elena Dolgopolova (RUS)	9.600
3rd place, bronze medalist(s)	Simona Amânar (ROU)	9.587
4	Maria Olaru (ROU)	9.575
5	Adrienn Varga (HUN)	9.562
6	Anna Kovalyova (RUS)	9.537
7	Alena Polozkova (BLR)	9.437
8	Sang Lan (CHN)	WD

===== Uneven Bars =====
Rank	Gymnast	Score
1st place, gold medalist(s)	Svetlana Khorkina (RUS)	9.825
2nd place, silver medalist(s)	Elise Ray (USA)	9.700
3rd place, bronze medalist(s)	Simona Amânar (ROU)	9.600
4	Corina Ungureanu (ROU)	9.575
5	Dominique Dawes (USA)	9.400
6	Olga Teslenko (UKR)	9.200
7	Ling Jie (CHN)	8.925
8	Meng Fei (CHN)	8.600

===== Balance Beam =====
Rank	Gymnast	Score
1st place, gold medalist(s)	Kristen Maloney (USA)	9.775
2nd place, silver medalist(s)	Olga Teslenko (UKR)	9.725
3rd place, bronze medalist(s)	Corina Ungureanu (ROU)	9.700
4	Zeena McLaughlin (AUS)	9.675
5	Yevgeniya Kuznetsova (RUS)	9.650
6	Simona Amânar (ROU)	9.600
7	Ling Jie (CHN)	9.250
8	Anna Kovalyova (RUS)	8.800

===== Floor =====
Rank	Gymnast	Score
1st place, gold medalist(s)	Vanessa Atler (USA)	9.775
2nd place, silver medalist(s)	Simona Amânar (ROU)	9.725
3rd place, bronze medalist(s)	Corina Ungureanu (ROU)	9.650
4	Meng Fei (CHN)	9.525
5	Elena Produnova (RUS)	9.250
6	Olga Teslenko (UKR)	9.075
7	Svetlana Khorkina (RUS)	8.975
8	Zeena McLaughlin (AUS)	8.900

==== Mixed ====
===== Pairs =====
Rank	Pair	Score
1st place, gold medalist(s)	China 1 Ling Jie; Xu Huang (CHN)	39.000
2nd place, silver medalist(s)	Russia 1 Svetlana Khorkina; Alexei Nemov (RUS)	38.725
3rd place, bronze medalist(s)	Russia 2 Anna Kovalyova; Alexei Bondarenko (RUS)	38.700
4	Ukraine Olga Teslenko; Roman Zozulia (UKR)	38.400
5	Australia (AUS) / Cuba Zeena McLaughlin; Eric Lopez Rios (CUB)	38.350
6	Belarus Alena Polozkova; Aleksandr Shosktak (BLR)	38.025
7	Russia 3 Yevgeniya Kuznetsova; Nikolai Kryukov (RUS)	37.925
8	China 2 Meng Fei; Yufu Lu (CHN)	36.875

=== Rhythmic Gymnastics ===
==== Individual All-Around ====
Rank	Gymnast	Score
1st place, gold medalist(s)	Alina Kabaeva (RUS)	39.781
2nd place, silver medalist(s)	Elena Vitrichenko (UKR)	39.657
3rd place, bronze medalist(s)	Evgenia Pavlina (BLR)	39.640
4	Teodora Alexandrova (BUL)	39.433
5	Asel Mustafina (RUS)	39.241
6	Tamara Yerofeeva (UKR)	39.199
7	Edita Schaufler (GER)	39.161
8	Kate Jeffress (USA)	38.782

==== Hoop ====
Rank	Gymnast	Score
1st place, gold medalist(s)	Alina Kabaeva (RUS)	9.983
2nd place, silver medalist(s)	Evgenia Pavlina (BLR)	9.900
3rd place, bronze medalist(s)	Elena Vitrichenko (UKR)	9.883
4	Teodora Alexandrova (BUL)	9.841
5	Asel Mustafina (RUS)	9.833
6	Edita Schaufler (GER)	9.783
6	Tamara Yerofeyeva (UKR)	9.783
8	Kate Jeffress (USA)	9.625

==== Rope ====
Rank	Gymnast	Score
1st place, gold medalist(s)	Elena Vitrichenko (UKR)	9.908
2nd place, silver medalist(s)	Alina Kabaeva (RUS)	9.900
3rd place, bronze medalist(s)	Evgenia Pavlina (BLR)	9.891
4	Teodora Alexandrova (BUL)	9.833
5	Asel Mustafina (RUS)	9.812
6	Edita Schaufler (GER)	9.758
7	Tamara Yerofeyeva (UKR)	9.750
8	Kate Jeffress (USA)	9.650

==== Clubs ====
Rank	Gymnast	Score
1st place, gold medalist(s)	Alina Kabaeva (RUS)	9.958
2nd place, silver medalist(s)	Evgenia Pavlina (BLR)	9.933
3rd place, bronze medalist(s)	Teodora Alexandrova (BUL)	9.866
4	Tamara Yerofeyeva (UKR)	9.808
5	Elena Vitrichenko (UKR)	9.800
6	Edita Schaufler (GER)	9.783
7	Asel Mustafina (RUS)	9.758
8	Kate Jeffress (USA)	9.633

==== Ribbon ====
Rank	Gymnast	Score
1st place, gold medalist(s)	Alina Kabaeva (RUS)	9.941
2nd place, silver medalist(s)	Evgenia Pavlina (BLR)	9.933
3rd place, bronze medalist(s)	Teodora Alexandrova (BUL)	9.858
3rd place, bronze medalist(s)	Asel Mustafina (RUS)	9.858
5	Elena Vitrichenko (UKR)	9.800
6	Tamara Yerofeyeva (UKR)	9.775
6	Edita Schaufler (GER)	9.775
8	Kate Jeffress (USA)	9.641

== Medal table ==
=== Overall ===
Rank	Nation	Gold	Silver	Bronze	Total
1	United States (USA)	5	2	2	9
2	Russia (RUS)	3	5	3	11
3	Belarus (BLR)	2	2	0	4
4	Kazakhstan (KAZ)	1	0	1	2
5	China (CHN)	1	0	0	1
6	Romania (ROU)	0	2	5	7
7	Ukraine (UKR)	0	1	0	1
8	Cuba (CUB)	0	0	1	1
Totals (8 entries)		12	12	12	36

=== Men ===
Rank	Nation	Gold	Silver	Bronze	Total
1	Russia	2	4	3	9
2	Belarus	2	2	0	4
3	United States	1	1	2	4
4	Kazakhstan	1	0	1	2
5	China	1	0	0	1
6	Cuba	0	0	1	1
Totals (6 entries)		7	7	7	21

=== Women ===
Rank	Nation	Gold	Silver	Bronze	Total
1	United States	4	1	0	5
2	Russia	1	1	0	2
3	Romania	0	2	5	7
4	Ukraine	0	1	0	1
Totals (4 entries)		5	5	5	15
