= Asian Artistic Gymnastics Championships – Men's parallel bars =

The Asian Artistic Gymnastics Championships were first held in 1996.

Three medals are awarded: gold for first place, silver for second place, and bronze for third place.

== Medalists ==
Year	Location	Gold	Silver	Bronze
1996	(China) Changsha	(China) Huang Xu	(North Korea) Jong U-chol	(China) Shen Jian
2003	(China) Guangzhou	(China) Liang Fuliang	(South Korea) Kim Dae-eun	(Japan) Masaki Endo
2006	(India) Surat	(Japan) Tomoharu Sano	(China) Dong Zhendong	(South Korea) Yoo Won-chul
2008	(Qatar) Doha	(Japan) Yosuke Hoshi (Kazakhstan) Ildar Valeyev	Not awarded	(North Korea) Kim Jin-hyok
2012	(China) Putian	(China) Zhou Shixiong	(Vietnam) Nguyễn Hà Thanh	(China) Ji Lianshen
2015	(Japan) Hiroshima	(China) He Youxiao	(China) Zhu Xiaodong	(Japan) Kazuma Kaya
2017	(Thailand) Bangkok	(China) Zou Jingyuan	(North Korea) Han Jong-hyok	(Vietnam) Đinh Phương Thành
2019	(Mongolia) Ulaanbaatar	(China) Liu Rongbing	(China) Hu Xuwei	(Vietnam) Đinh Phương Thành
2022	(Qatar) Doha	(China) Carlos Yulo	(Japan) Tsuyoshi Hasegawa	(China) Yin Dehang
2023	Singapore	(Philippines) Carlos Yulo	(Japan) Shinnosuke Oka	(South Korea) Yin Dehang
2024	(Uzbekistan) Tashkent	(Philippines) Carlos Yulo	(China) Yin Dehang	(Uzbekistan) Rasuljon Abdurakhimov
2025	(South Korea) Jecheon	(Japan) Shinnosuke Oka	(Japan) Tomoharu Tsunogai	(Philippines) Carlos Yulo
2026	(China) Zunyi	(China) Zhang Boheng	(South Korea) Ryu Sung-hyun	(Chinese Taipei) Hung Yuan-hsi

== Medal table ==
Rank	Nation	Gold	Silver	Bronze	Total
1	China (CHN)	8	4	3	15
2	Japan (JPN)	3	3	2	8
3	Philippines (PHI)	2	0	1	3
4	Kazakhstan (KAZ)	1	0	0	1
5	South Korea (KOR)	0	2	2	4
6	North Korea (PRK)	0	2	1	3
7	Vietnam (VIE)	0	1	2	3
8	Chinese Taipei (TPE)	0	0	1	1
8	Uzbekistan (UZB)	0	0	1	1
Totals (9 entries)		14	12	13	39
