= Martin Fournier =

Martin Fournier may refer to:

- Martin Fournier (filmmaker), Canadian documentary filmmaker
- Martin Fournier (gymnast), a medalist at the 1992 Junior Pan American Artistic Gymnastics Championships
- Martin Fournier (writer), Canadian historian and children's writer
