= Dominique Moceanu =

American artistic gymnast (born 1981)

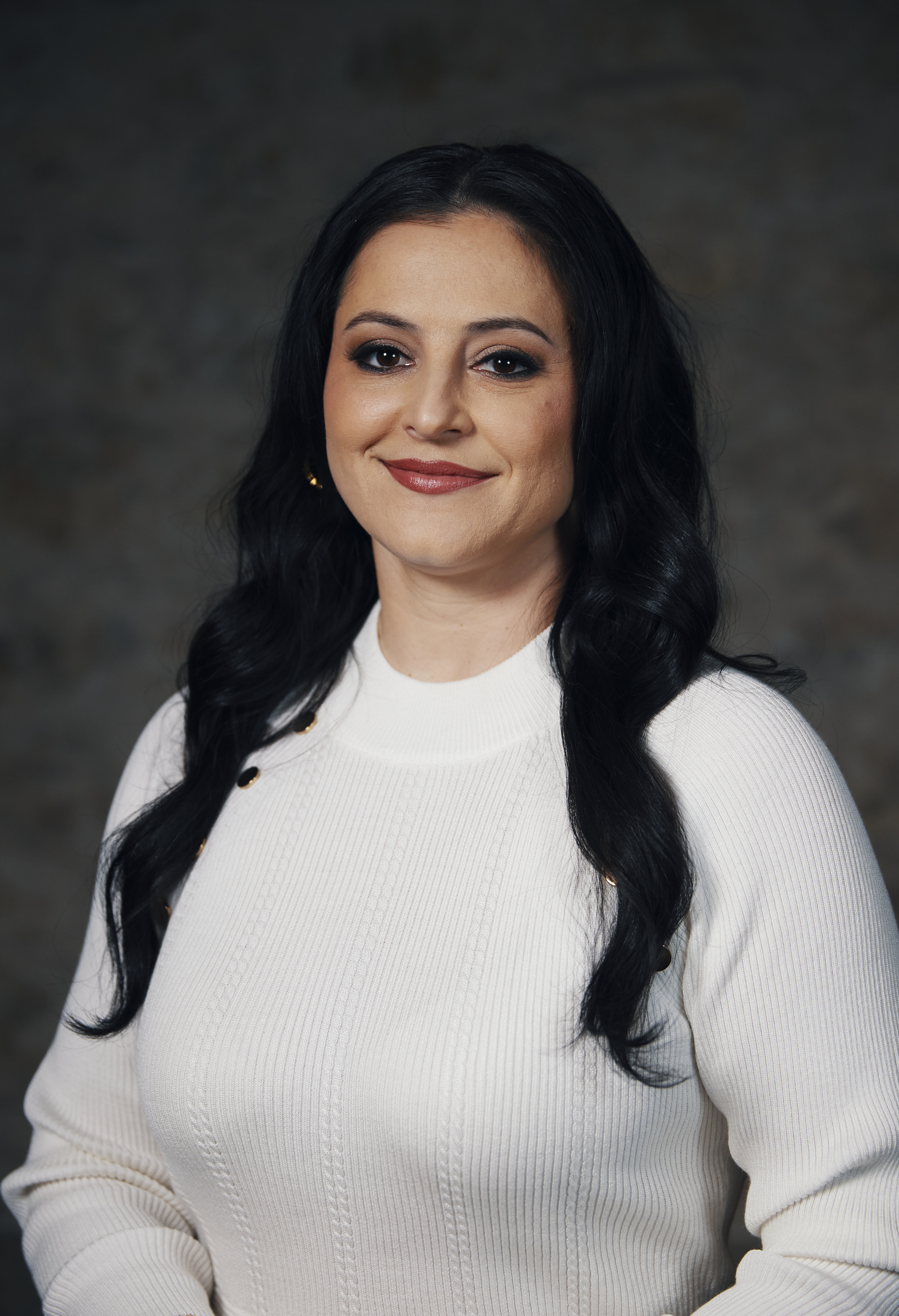
- Moceanu at SXSW 2024

Personal information
- Full name: Dominique Helena Moceanu
- Born: September 30, 1981 (age 44) Los Angeles, California, U.S.

Gymnastics career
- Discipline: Women's artistic gymnastics
- Country represented: United States (1992–2000, 2004–2006)
- Club: LaFleur's; Károlyi's; Moceanu Gymnastics; Cincinnati Gymnastics Academy
- Former coaches: Jeff LaFleur; Béla and Márta Károlyi; Luminița Miscenco; Mary Lee Tracy; Alexander Alexandrov
- Choreographer: Geza Pozar; Dominic Zito
- Music: 1996: "The Devil Went Down to Georgia"
- Retired: 2000; 2006
Medal record
Women's artistic gymnastics
Representing United States
Olympic Games
Gold medal – first place	1996 Atlanta	Team
World Championships
Silver medal – second place	1995 Sabae	Balance beam
Bronze medal – third place	1995 Sabae	Team
Goodwill Games
Gold medal – first place	1998 New York City	All-around

Dominique Helena Moceanu (/moʊˈtʃiːɑːnuː/, moh-CHEE-ah-noo; Romanian: [moˈtʃe̯anu]; born September 30, 1981) is an American former artistic gymnast. She was a member of the gold medal-winning United States women's gymnastics team, the "Magnificent Seven", at the 1996 Summer Olympics in Atlanta. She won two medals at the 1995 World Championships and the all-around title at the 1998 Goodwill Games.

Moceanu trained under Marta and Béla Károlyi, and later Luminița Miscenco and Mary Lee Tracy. She earned her first national team berth at age 10 and represented the United States in various international competitions at the junior level. She was the all-around silver medalist at the 1992 Junior Pan American Championships and the 1994 junior national all-around champion. In 1995, at the age of 13, she became the youngest gymnast to win the senior all-around title at the U.S. Championships. She was the youngest member of both the 1995 World Championships and the 1996 Olympic teams.

Moceanu's last major success in gymnastics was at the 1998 Goodwill Games, where she became the first American to win the all-around gold medal. Family problems, coaching changes, and injuries derailed her efforts to make the 2000 Olympics in Sydney, and she retired from the sport in 2000. Since then, she has worked as a coach, studied business management, and written a memoir, Off Balance.

== Early life ==
Moceanu was born in the Hollywood neighborhood of Los Angeles, California, on September 30, 1981, to Romanian Americans Dumitru Moceanu (1954–2008) and Camelia Moceanu (née Staicu; b. 1961). Both of her parents were gymnasts in Romania. Both of her parents were ethnic Aromanians, and Dominique speaks the Aromanian language fluently. Her parents emigrated from Romania to the United States in 1980. She has two younger siblings, Jennifer Bricker (born 1987), who was born without legs and adopted shortly after birth by Gerald and Sharon Bricker; and Christina Moceanu Chapman (born 1989). She began training as a gymnast at the age of three in Illinois, and at the age of 10, the family relocated to Houston, Texas, in order for her to train with Béla Károlyi and Márta Károlyi.

== Gymnastics career ==
=== Early career ===
Less than a year after beginning to train with the Károlyis, Moceanu finished fifth in the all-around at the 1992 U.S. Championships. She was then selected for the junior national team at 10 years old. She won five medals, four gold and one silver, at the 1992 Junior Pan American Games as the youngest competitor of the event. She finished fourth in the floor exercise final at the 1993 U.S. Olympic Festival after the crowd booed her score, leading the judges to increase it from 9.600 to 9.650. She became the junior national all-around champion in 1994.

In 1995, Moceanu became the youngest gymnast ever to win the all-around title at the U.S. Championships at the age of 13. She was also the youngest member of the U.S. team at the 1995 World Championships, helping the team win the bronze medal. She finished fifth in the all-around and was the highest-placing American. She won a silver medal in the balance beam final, tying with Ukraine's Lilia Podkopayeva with a score of 9.837.

Moceanu's national and international successes, combined with her bubbly attitude, earned her attention and a wide fan base both in and out of the gymnastics community in the lead up to the 1996 Summer Olympics. Before the Olympics, she was featured in Vanity Fair, and she wrote an autobiography, Dominique Moceanu: An American Champion, with Steve Woodward. The book reached number seven on The New York Times Best Seller list.

=== 1996 Summer Olympics ===
Moceanu was expected to be a major medal contender at the 1996 Summer Olympics, held in Atlanta, Georgia. However, after the 1996 U.S. Championships, where she placed third in the all-around, she was diagnosed with a stress fracture in her right tibia. Her injury forced her to sit out the Olympic Trials, but she was petitioned onto the team on the strength of her U.S. Championship scores.

At the Olympic Games, still struggling with her injury and sporting a heavily bandaged leg, Moceanu contributed to the team gold medal with performances good enough to qualify her for the event finals on the balance beam and floor exercise. However, she faltered in the last rotation of team optionals, falling on both vaults. Her teammate Kerri Strug vaulted after her to clinch the gold for the United States, but injured her ankle in the process. Moceanu took Strug's place in the all-around finals, but she made a mistake on the balance beam and placed ninth. In the balance beam final, she fell when she missed a foot on a layout and hit her head on the balance beam. She finished the routine and went on to have a strong performance in the floor exercise finals later that day, finishing fourth.

=== Post-Olympics ===
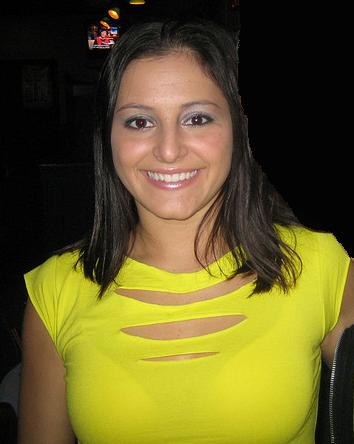
Moceanu in 2006

After the 1996 Olympics, Moceanu participated in professional gymnastics exhibitions, including a 34-city tour, before returning to competition. With the retirement of the Károlyis, she began training with other coaches at Moceanu Gymnastics, a gym built and run by her family. She placed ninth in the all-around at the 1997 U.S. Championships. Because of new age eligibily rules that prevented gymnasts younger than 16 from competing at international competitions, Moceanu was named to the six-person team for the 1997 World Championships. There, she led the mostly inexperienced U.S. team to a sixth-place finish. She also qualified for the individual all-around final, finishing 14th.

In 1998, she began working with a new coach, Luminiţa Miscenco, and she adjusted to a significant growth spurt. At the 1998 Goodwill Games, she became the first non-Russian to win the all-around title. In doing so, she defeated the reigning World all-around champion, Svetlana Khorkina, and the World silver and bronze medalists, Simona Amânar and Yelena Produnova. She outscored the second-place finisher, Maria Olaru, by 0.687 points. Later that year, she won the bronze medal in the all-around at the U.S. Championships.

Two years later, training with Mary Lee Tracy at Cincinnati Gymnastics Academy, Moceanu placed eighth in the all-around at the 2000 U.S. Championships. She qualified for the Olympic Trials, but she withdrew due to knee injury. In the fall of 2000, Moceanu participated in a post-Olympics national exhibition tour. She also participated in the post-Olympics Rock N' Roll Gymnastics Championship Tour in 2004.

After a five-year hiatus from elite gymnastics, Moceanu announced in 2005 that she was returning. An injury kept her from competing that year, but she continued to train on the floor exercise and the vault, and in the summer of 2006, she was invited to attend the USA Gymnastics national team training camp. Moceanu competed at the 2006 U.S. Classic, where she successfully performed a full-twisting Tsukahara vault. On the floor exercise, however, she went out of bounds on one tumbling pass and fell on another, posting one of the lowest scores of the meet. As a result, she did not qualify to the 2006 U.S. Championships. She stated that USA Gymnastics officials had told her she would qualify if she attended the national training camp and competed at least one event at the U.S. Classic. But after the U.S. Classic, she was told that she had needed a combined score on two events of 28.0 or higher to qualify, and her combined score on vault and floor was 27.1. She appealed the decision, but it was upheld.

== Personal life ==
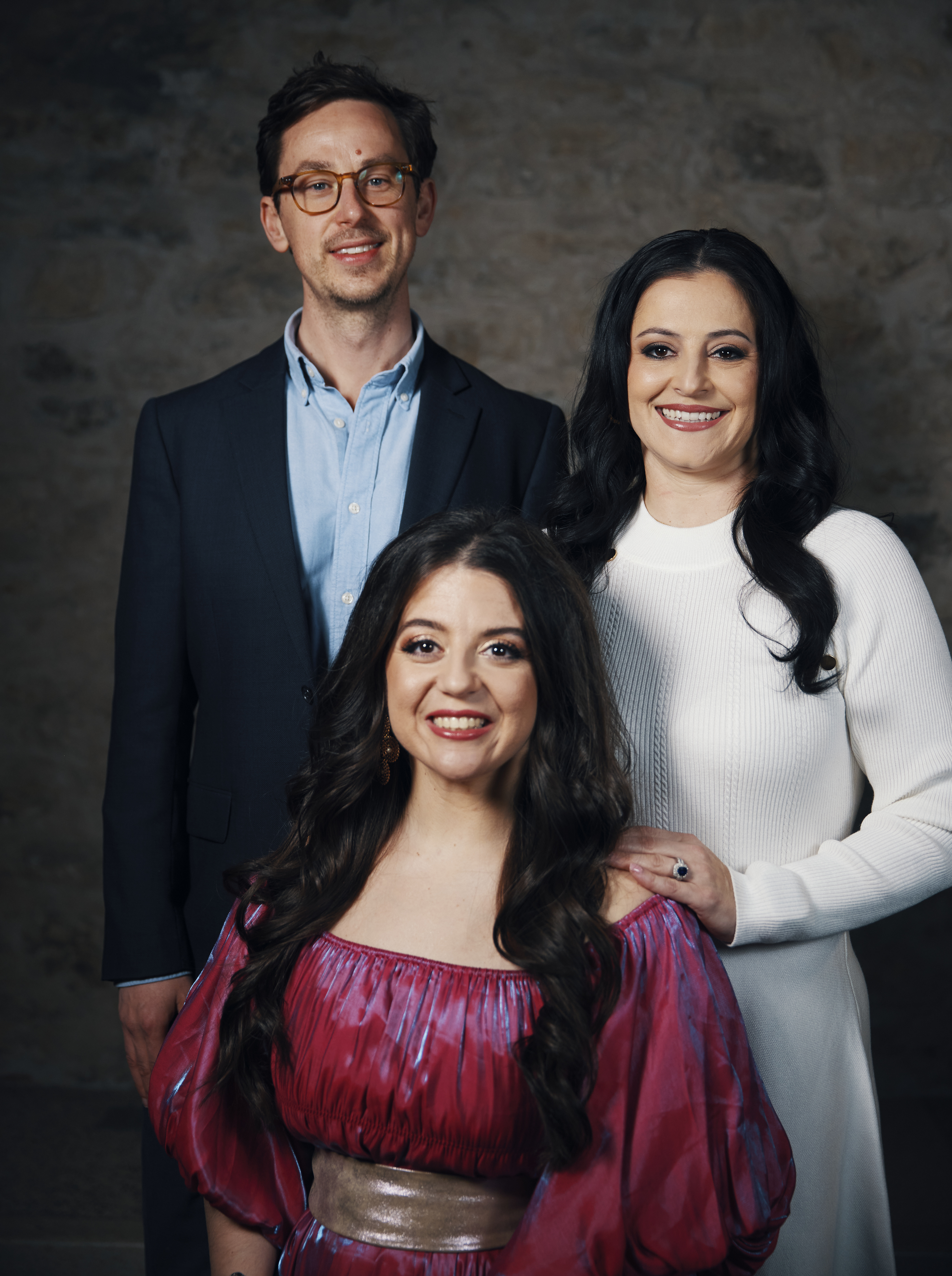
"She Looks Like Me" cast and crew at SXSW 2024 (Torquil Jones, Jen Bricker–Bauer, and Dominique Moceanu)

On October 27, 1998, Moceanu was emancipated by a Houston court, eleven months prior to her 18th birthday. Moceanu had reportedly run away from home earlier that month, on October 17, and filed for emancipation on October 19. She accused her parents of abuse and exploitation, and alleged they had used US$4,000,000 of her earnings to build a 70,000 square foot gymnastic training center in Spring, Texas. Moceanu's parents ultimately decided not to fight her in court and she was given control over her future earnings and allowed to live independently, though her father remained in charge of her trust. The family ultimately settled her past earning privately. Despite her father's claim that the family gym was a financial success, it permanently closed in February 1999, less than two years after it opened. She eventually reconciled with her father, with him walking her down the aisle at her wedding in 2006.

Moceanu is married to Dr. Michael Canales, a podiatrist and collegiate gymnast. The two wed on November 4, 2006, in Houston, in a Romanian Orthodox ceremony attended by fellow gymnasts Paul Hamm, Morgan Hamm, Bart Conner, and Nadia Comăneci. They first met in 1994, when Moceanu was 12 years old. Together, they have three children, born in 2007, 2009 and 2022. Their second child and only son, Vincent, is reportedly interested in pursuing a career in gymnastics, appearing on American Ninja Warrior Junior in 2020, and voiced hope to compete at the 2028 Summer Olympics.

Moceanu attended Northland Christian School and graduated from John Carroll University, earning a degree in business management in 2009. After coaching part-time at Gymnastics World in Broadview Heights, Ohio, she runs the Dominique Moceanu Gymnastics Center in Medina, Ohio, where her son Vincent Canales also trains.

=== Memoir and sister ===
In her memoir Off Balance, Moceanu had discovered she has a younger sister, Jennifer Bricker, who was born without legs and was given up for adoption at the hospital at birth. Bricker is an acrobat and aerialist who idolized Moceanu before finding out they were sisters. The documentaries Eva Longoria's Versus: Romanian Roots (a spinoff of ESPN's 30 for 30) and She Looks Like Me from director Torquil Jones tells the story of the two discovering their connection.

In Off Balance, Moceanu also alleged that Béla and Marta Károlyi were abusive and manipulative when she trained under them. Moceanu, Jamie Dantzscher, and Jessica Howard testified at a Senate Judiciary Committee hearing on March 28, 2017, about the USA Gymnastics sex abuse scandal. Moceanu shared that she had not been sexually assaulted by Larry Nassar but explained how the Károlyis created a culture of abuse and fear.

== Competitive history ==
Competitive history of Dominique Moceanu at the junior level
Year	Event	Team	AA	VT	UB	BB	FX
1991	American Classic		7				
1992	U.S. Classic		10				
1992	U.S. Championships		5				
1992	Junior Pan American Championships	1st place, gold medalist(s)	2nd place, silver medalist(s)	1st place, gold medalist(s)	1st place, gold medalist(s)		1st place, gold medalist(s)
1993	American Classic		10				
1993	U.S. Classic		8				
1993	U.S. Championships		7				
1994	American Classic		4				
1994	U.S. Championships		1st place, gold medalist(s)	1st place, gold medalist(s)	3rd place, bronze medalist(s)	3rd place, bronze medalist(s)	1st place, gold medalist(s)

Competitive history of Dominique Moceanu at the senior level
Year	Event	Team	AA	VT	UB	BB	FX
1995	American Classic		2nd place, silver medalist(s)	1st place, gold medalist(s)		3rd place, bronze medalist(s)	3rd place, bronze medalist(s)
1995	U.S. Championships		1st place, gold medalist(s)	3rd place, bronze medalist(s)	6	5	2nd place, silver medalist(s)
1995	World Team Trials		1st place, gold medalist(s)				
1995	World Championships	3rd place, bronze medalist(s)	5			2nd place, silver medalist(s)	7
1996	U.S. Championships		3rd place, bronze medalist(s)				
1996	Olympic Games	1st place, gold medalist(s)	9			6	4
1997	U.S. Championships		9				
1997	World Championships	6	14				
1998	Goodwill Games		1st place, gold medalist(s)				
1998	U.S. Championships		3rd place, bronze medalist(s)	2nd place, silver medalist(s)		2nd place, silver medalist(s)	3rd place, bronze medalist(s)
2000	U.S. Classic		6				
2000	U.S. Championships		8				
