= 1997 World Artistic Gymnastics Championships =

Gymnastics competition

- Venue: Malley Sports Center
- Location: Lausanne, Switzerland
- Start date: August 31, 1997
- End date: September 7, 1997

The 33rd Artistic Gymnastics World Championships were held in Lausanne, Switzerland, in 1997.

The 1997 Worlds were notable because they were the first major contest to be held after the elimination of compulsory exercises. For this competition, tie-breaker policies were used. When scores were identical, the gymnast with the higher score in the preliminary round was awarded the higher placement in finals.

== Medalists ==
| Event | Gold | Silver | Bronze |
|---|---|---|---|
Men
| Team all-around | China; Shen Jian; Li Xiaopeng; Huang Xu; Lu Yufu; Xiao Junfeng; Zhang Jinjing | Belarus; Ivan Ivankov; Vitaly Rudnitsky; Dmitry Kasperovich; Aleksandr Shostak; Ivan Pavlovski; Alexei Sinkevich | Russia; Dmitri Vasilenko; Alexei Bondarenko; Alexei Voropaev; Alexei Nemov; Evgeni Ghukov; Nikolai Kryukov |
| Individual all-around | (Belarus) Ivan Ivankov | (Russia) Alexei Bondarenko | (Japan) Naoya Tsukahara |
| Floor | (Russia) Alexei Nemov | (France) Dimitri Karbanenko | (China) Li Xiaopeng |
| Pommel horse | (Germany) Valery Belenky | (France) Eric Poujade | (North Korea) Pae Gil-su |
| Rings | (Italy) Yuri Chechi | (Hungary) Szilveszter Csollány | (Belarus) Ivan Ivankov |
| Vault | (Kazakhstan) Sergei Fedorchenko | (Russia) Nikolai Kryukov | (Romania) Adrian Ianculescu |
| Parallel bars | (China) Zhang Jinjing | (China) Li Xiaopeng | (Japan) Naoya Tsukahara |
| Horizontal bar | (Finland) Jani Tanskanen | (Spain) Jesús Carballo | (Ukraine) Alexander Beresh |
Women
| Team all-around | Romania; Simona Amânar; Claudia Presăcan; Gina Gogean; Alexandra Marinescu; Corina Ungureanu; Mirela Tugurlan | Russia; Svetlana Khorkina; Yelena Produnova; Yevgeniya Kuznetsova; Svetlana Bakhtina; Elena Dolgopolova; Elena Grosheva | China; Liu Xuan; Kui Yuanyuan; Meng Fei; Bi Wenjing; Mo Huilan; Zhou Duan |
| Individual all-around | (Russia) Svetlana Khorkina | (Romania) Simona Amânar | (Russia) Yelena Produnova |
| Vault | (Romania) Simona Amânar | (China) Zhou Duan | (Romania) Gina Gogean |
| Uneven bars | (Russia) Svetlana Khorkina | (China) Meng Fei | (China) Bi Wenjing |
| Balance beam | (Romania) Gina Gogean | (Russia) Svetlana Khorkina | (China) Kui Yuanyuan |
| Floor | (Romania) Gina Gogean | (Russia) Svetlana Khorkina | (Russia) Yelena Produnova |

== Medal table ==
=== Overall ===
| Rank | Nation | Gold | Silver | Bronze | Total |
|---|---|---|---|---|---|
| 1 | Romania (ROU) | 4 | 1 | 2 | 7 |
| 2 | Russia (RUS) | 3 | 5 | 3 | 11 |
| 3 | China (CHN) | 2 | 3 | 4 | 9 |
| 4 | Belarus (BLR) | 1 | 1 | 1 | 3 |
| 5 | Finland (FIN) | 1 | 0 | 0 | 1 |
| 5 | Germany (GER) | 1 | 0 | 0 | 1 |
| 5 | Italy (ITA) | 1 | 0 | 0 | 1 |
| 5 | Kazakhstan (KAZ) | 1 | 0 | 0 | 1 |
| 9 | France (FRA) | 0 | 2 | 0 | 2 |
| 10 | Hungary (HUN) | 0 | 1 | 0 | 1 |
| 10 | Spain (ESP) | 0 | 1 | 0 | 1 |
| 12 | Japan (JPN) | 0 | 0 | 2 | 2 |
| 13 | North Korea (PRK) | 0 | 0 | 1 | 1 |
| 13 | Ukraine (UKR) | 0 | 0 | 1 | 1 |
| Totals (14 entries) | | 14 | 14 | 14 | 42 |

=== Men ===
| Rank | Nation | Gold | Silver | Bronze | Total |
|---|---|---|---|---|---|
| 1 | China | 2 | 1 | 1 | 4 |
| 2 | Russia | 1 | 2 | 1 | 4 |
| 3 | Belarus | 1 | 1 | 1 | 3 |
| 4 | Finland | 1 | 0 | 0 | 1 |
| 4 | Germany | 1 | 0 | 0 | 1 |
| 4 | Italy | 1 | 0 | 0 | 1 |
| 4 | Kazakhstan | 1 | 0 | 0 | 1 |
| 8 | France | 0 | 2 | 0 | 2 |
| 9 | Hungary | 0 | 1 | 0 | 1 |
| 9 | Spain | 0 | 1 | 0 | 1 |
| 11 | Japan | 0 | 0 | 2 | 2 |
| 12 | North Korea | 0 | 0 | 1 | 1 |
| 12 | Romania | 0 | 0 | 1 | 1 |
| 12 | Ukraine | 0 | 0 | 1 | 1 |
| Totals (14 entries) | | 8 | 8 | 8 | 24 |

=== Women ===
| Rank | Nation | Gold | Silver | Bronze | Total |
|---|---|---|---|---|---|
| 1 | Romania | 4 | 1 | 1 | 6 |
| 2 | Russia | 2 | 3 | 2 | 7 |
| 3 | China | 0 | 2 | 3 | 5 |
| Totals (3 entries) | | 6 | 6 | 6 | 18 |

== Men ==
=== Team ===
| Rank | Team | Floor (gymnastics) | Pommel horse | Rings (gymnastics) | Vault (gymnastics) | Parallel bars | Horizontal bar | Total |
|---|---|---|---|---|---|---|---|---|
| 1st place, gold medalist(s) | China | 37.861 | 37.286 | 36.737 | 38.586 | 38.473 | 37.174 | 226.117 |
| 1st place, gold medalist(s) | Huang Xu | - | 8.862 | 9.437 | 9.562 | 9.237 | 9.400 | 226.117 |
| 1st place, gold medalist(s) | Li Xiaopeng | 9.612 | 9.200 | - | 9.475 | 9.712 | 8.762 | 226.117 |
| 1st place, gold medalist(s) | Lu Yufu | 9.412 | 9.312 | 8.175 | 9.687 | 9.562 | 9.287 | 226.117 |
| 1st place, gold medalist(s) | Shen Jian | 9.250 | 9.137 | 8.850 | - | 9.462 | - | 226.117 |
| 1st place, gold medalist(s) | Zhang Jinjing | 9.437 | 9.637 | 9.425 | 9.537 | 9.737 | 9.612 | 226.117 |
| 1st place, gold medalist(s) | Xiao Junfeng | 9.400 | - | 9.025 | 9.800 | - | 8.875 | 226.117 |
| 2nd place, silver medalist(s) | Belarus | 36.549 | 36.674 | 37.011 | 37.748 | 37.737 | 35.849 | 221.568 |
| 2nd place, silver medalist(s) | Alexander Shostak | 8.825 | 8.462 | 9.312 | - | 9.425 | 8.050 | 221.568 |
| 2nd place, silver medalist(s) | Ivan Ivankov | - | 9.537 | 9.550 | 9.512 | 9.600 | 9.337 | 221.568 |
| 2nd place, silver medalist(s) | Vitaly Kasperovich | 8.187 | - | 8.987 | 9.662 | 9.087 | - | 221.568 |
| 2nd place, silver medalist(s) | Ivan Pavlovski | 9.175 | 9.012 | 8.675 | 9.175 | 9.200 | 8.912 | 221.568 |
| 2nd place, silver medalist(s) | Vitaly Rudnitski | 9.337 | 8.900 | 9.162 | 9.337 | 9.512 | 8.750 | 221.568 |
| 2nd place, silver medalist(s) | Alexei Sinkevich | 9.212 | 9.225 | - | 9.237 | - | 8.850 | 221.568 |
| 3rd place, bronze medalist(s) | Russia | 37.474 | 37.012 | 36.624 | 38.462 | 36.961 | 34.149 | 220.682 |
| 3rd place, bronze medalist(s) | Alexei Bondarenko | 9.437 | 9.412 | 9.250 | 9.337 | 9.662 | 7.625 | 220.682 |
| 3rd place, bronze medalist(s) | Evgeni Ghukov | 9.312 | 8.962 | 8.987 | - | 9.200 | 8.987 | 220.682 |
| 3rd place, bronze medalist(s) | Nikolay Krukov | 9.075 | 9.350 | 9.212 | 9.750 | 9.062 | 8.550 | 220.682 |
| 3rd place, bronze medalist(s) | Alexei Nemov | 9.650 | 9.225 | - | 9.675 | - | 8.225 | 220.682 |
| 3rd place, bronze medalist(s) | Dmitri Vasilenko | 8.512 | 9.025 | 8.887 | 9.475 | 9.037 | - | 220.682 |
| 3rd place, bronze medalist(s) | Alexei Voropaev | - | - | 9.175 | 9.562 | 8.687 | 8.387 | 220.682 |
| 4 | Japan | 36.099 | 37.423 | 36.787 | 37.549 | 36.848 | 35.937 | 220.643 |
| 4 | Kenichi Fujita | 9.050 | 9.212 | 9.050 | 9.462 | 9.012 | 8.162 | 220.643 |
| 4 | Yoshiaki Hatakeda | 8.950 | 9.437 | 8.525 | 9.225 | 9.112 | 8.875 | 220.643 |
| 4 | Takuya Kishimoto | 8.912 | 9.075 | - | - | - | 8.862 | 220.643 |
| 4 | Shigeru Kurihara | - | - | 9.375 | 9.200 | 8.575 | - | 220.643 |
| 4 | Naoya Tsukahara | 8.875 | 9.337 | 9.412 | 9.325 | 9.162 | 9.025 | 220.643 |
| 4 | Yoshihiro Saito | 9.187 | 9.437 | 8.950 | 9.537 | 9.562 | 9.175 | 220.643 |
| 5 | United States | 36.586 | 35.849 | 36.249 | 37.987 | 36.887 | 36.248 | 219.806 |
| 5 | Mike Dutka | 9.187 | 8.862 | - | 9.512 | 8.800 | - | 219.806 |
| 5 | Jason Gatson | 9.062 | 8.650 | 8.775 | 9.500 | 9.375 | 8.375 | 219.806 |
| 5 | John Macready | 9.062 | 8.612 | - | - | - | 9.087 | 219.806 |
| 5 | John Roethlisberger | - | 9.050 | 8.937 | 9.450 | 8.800 | 9.087 | 219.806 |
| 5 | Jay Thornton | 9.225 | - | 8.950 | 9.175 | 9.112 | 8.637 | 219.806 |
| 5 | Blaine Wilson | 9.112 | 9.287 | 9.587 | 9.525 | 9.600 | 9.437 | 219.806 |
| 6 | Germany | 34.787 | 36.712 | 37.137 | 36.574 | 37.049 | 35.575 | 217.834 |
| 6 | Valeri Belenki | 8.450 | 9.550 | 9.575 | 9.262 | 9.387 | - | 217.834 |
| 6 | Uwe Billerbeck | - | - | 9.275 | - | 9.237 | 8.650 | 217.834 |
| 6 | Daniel Farago | 8.575 | 9.075 | 8.812 | 9.037 | 8.950 | 8.612 | 217.834 |
| 6 | Sergei Charkov | 8.712 | 8.775 | 9.475 | 9.250 | 9.400 | 9.175 | 217.834 |
| 6 | Dimitri Nonin | 7.950 | 9.312 | - | 9.025 | - | 9.050 | 217.834 |
| 6 | Sergej Pfeifer | 9.050 | 8.600 | 8.775 | 8.662 | 9.025 | 8.700 | 217.834 |

=== All-around ===
| Rank | Gymnast | Floor (gymnastics) | Pommel horse | Rings (gymnastics) | Vault (gymnastics) | Parallel bars | Horizontal bar | Total |
|---|---|---|---|---|---|---|---|---|
| 1st place, gold medalist(s) | Ivan Ivankov (BLR) | 9.362 | 9.100 | 9.625 | 9.575 | 9.700 | 9.525 | 56.887 |
| 2nd place, silver medalist(s) | Alexei Bondarenko (RUS) | 9.462 | 9.437 | 9.025 | 9.737 | 9.375 | 9.025 | 56.061 |
| 3rd place, bronze medalist(s) | Naoya Tsukahara (JPN) | 9.187 | 9.437 | 9.162 | 9.600 | 9.425 | 9.212 | 56.023 |
| 4 | Dmitri Karbanenko (FRA) | 9.525 | 9.487 | 8.887 | 9.625 | 9.200 | 9.212 | 55.936 |
| 5 | Huang Xu (CHN) | 8.537 | 9.625 | 9.362 | 9.525 | 9.237 | 9.512 | 55.798 |
| 6 | Nikolai Kryukov (RUS) | 8.562 | 9.437 | 9.275 | 9.650 | 9.037 | 9.662 | 55.623 |
| 7 | Jesús Carballo (ESP) | 9.000 | 8.975 | 9.487 | 9.162 | 9.362 | 9.500 | 55.486 |
| 8 | Eric López Ríos (CUB) | 8.975 | 9.100 | 9.350 | 9.437 | 9.312 | 8.887 | 55.061 |
| 9 | Alexander Beresh (UKR) | 8.462 | 9.550 | 9.062 | 9.812 | 8.525 | 9.525 | 54.936 |
| 10 | Blaine Wilson (USA) | 8.675 | 8.712 | 9.550 | 9.562 | 9.562 | 8.850 | 54.911 |
| 11 | Yoshiaki Hatakeda (JPN) | 8.887 | 9.500 | 8.375 | 9.100 | 9.362 | 9.487 | 54.711 |
| 12 | Lu Yufu (CHN) | 8.800 | 9.462 | 8.425 | 9.712 | 8.825 | 9.462 | 54.686 |
| 13 | Roman Zozulia (UKR) | 8.862 | 9.087 | 9.400 | 9.712 | 8.862 | 8.737 | 54.660 |
| 14 | Zhang Jinjing (CHN) | 9.375 | 8.950 | 8.412 | 9.487 | 9.675 | 8.700 | 54.599 |
| 15 | Sergei Kharkov (GER) | 8.662 | 8.962 | 9.537 | 9.300 | 8.900 | 9.187 | 54.548 |
| 16 | Sergei Fedorchenko (KAZ) | 9.375 | 9.375 | 7.850 | 9.725 | 8.575 | 9.462 | 54.362 |
| 17 | Cristian Leric (ROU) | 9.262 | 9.575 | 9.025 | 9.525 | 9.037 | 7.877 | 54.311 |
| 18 | Omar Cortes (ESP) | 8.437 | 9.137 | 9.462 | 9.137 | 8.987 | 9.150 | 54.310 |
| 19 | Andrei Kravtsov (AUS) | 9.250 | 9.487 | 8.362 | 9.037 | 9.025 | 9.025 | 54.186 |
| 20 | Sergei Pfeifer (GER) | 9.225 | 9.375 | 8.737 | 8.612 | 9.137 | 8.987 | 54.073 |
| 21 | Zoltán Supola (HUN) | 8.537 | 9.562 | 9.137 | 9.275 | 8.862 | 8.600 | 53.973 |
| 22 | Jason Gatson (USA) | 8.925 | 8.587 | 8.787 | 9.487 | 9.087 | 9.062 | 53.935 |
| 23 | Igors Vihrov (LAT) | 9.075 | 8.550 | 9.312 | 9.450 | 8.537 | 8.925 | 53.849 |
| 24 | Lazaro Lamela (CUB) | 8.650 | 8.675 | 8.775 | 9.400 | 8.925 | 9.125 | 53.550 |
| 25 | Alexei Dmitrenko (KAZ) | 7.900 | 9.175 | 8.700 | 9.525 | 9.225 | 9.025 | 53.550 |
| 26 | Alexei Nemov (RUS) | 9.550 | 9.225 | 6.825 | 9.725 | 9.000 | 9.062 | 53.387 |
| 27 | Vitaly Rudnitsky (BLR) | 8.175 | 9.000 | 9.175 | 9.150 | 9.212 | 8.612 | 53.324 |
| 28 | Dorin Petcu (ROU) | 9.037 | 9.487 | 8.225 | 9.587 | 8.350 | 8.475 | 53.161 |
| 29 | Mitja Petkovšek (SLO) | 8.300 | 8.562 | 8.900 | 8.962 | 9.425 | 8.875 | 53.024 |
| 30 | Lee Joo-Hyung (KOR) | 8.425 | 8.512 | 8.550 | 9.562 | 8.750 | 9.125 | 52.924 |
| 31 | Giovanni D'Innocenzo (ITA) | 8.750 | 8.362 | 8.712 | 9.212 | 8.787 | 8.987 | 52.810 |
| 32 | Valeri Goncharov (UKR) | 8.350 | 9.025 | 8.387 | 9.212 | 9.275 | 8.462 | 52.711 |
| 33 | Dieter Rehm (SUI) | 8.525 | 8.637 | 8.250 | 9.637 | 8.225 | 8.950 | 52.224 |
| 34 | Felipe Andres (SUI) | 8.587 | 8.200 | 8.325 | 9.387 | 8.550 | 8.875 | 51.924 |
| 35 | Kenichi Fujita (JPN) | 9.175 | 8.737 | 9.075 | 9.212 | 8.950 | 6.625 | 51.774 |

=== Floor exercise ===
| Rank | Gymnast | Total |
|---|---|---|
| 1st place, gold medalist(s) | Alexei Nemov (RUS) | 9.625 |
| 2nd place, silver medalist(s) | Dmitri Karbanenko (FRA) | 9.550 |
| 3rd place, bronze medalist(s) | Li Xiaopeng (CHN) | 9.537 |
| 4 | Evgeny Zhukov (RUS) | 9.412 |
| 5 | Valeri Pereshkura (UKR) | 9.275 |
| 6 | Vitaly Rudnitski (BLR) | 9.262 |
| 7 | Gervasio Deferr (ESP) | 8.887 |
| 8 | Sergei Fedorchenko (KAZ) | 8.625 |

=== Pommel horse ===
| Rank | Gymnast | Total |
|---|---|---|
| 1st place, gold medalist(s) | Valeri Belenki (GER) | 9.700 |
| 2nd place, silver medalist(s) | Eric Poujade (FRA) | 9.700 |
| 3rd place, bronze medalist(s) | Pae Gil Su (PRK) | 9.700 |
| 4 | Zhang Jinjing (CHN) | 9.662 |
| 5 | Nikolai Kryukov (RUS) | 9.612 |
| 6 | Zoltán Supola (HUN) | 9.600 |
| 7 | Adrian Ianculescu (ROU) | 9.487 |
| 8 | Marius Urzică (ROU) | 9.112 |

=== Rings ===
| Rank | Gymnast | Total |
|---|---|---|
| 1st place, gold medalist(s) | Yuri Chechi (ITA) | 9.775 |
| 2nd place, silver medalist(s) | Szilveszter Csollány (HUN) | 9.687 |
| 3rd place, bronze medalist(s) | Ivan Ivankov (BLR) | 9.662 |
| 4 | Valeri Belenki (GER) | 9.587 |
| 5 | Roberto Galli (ITA) | 9.575 |
| 6 | Dimosthenis Tampakos (GRE) | 9.562 |
| 7 | Alexei Demyanov (CRO) | 9.537 |
| 8 | Yoshihiro Saito (JPN) | 9.500 |

=== Vault ===
| Rank | Gymnast | Total |
|---|---|---|
| 1st place, gold medalist(s) | Sergei Fedorchenko (KAZ) | 9.581 |
| 2nd place, silver medalist(s) | Nikolai Kryukov (RUS) | 9.556 |
| 3rd place, bronze medalist(s) | Adrian Ianculescu (ROU) | 9.437 |
| 4 | Xiao Junfeng (CHN) | 9.325 |
| 5 | Alexei Bondarenko (RUS) | 9.218 |
| 6 | Roman Zozulia (UKR) | 8.999 |
| 7 | Valeri Goncharov (UKR) | 8.981 |
| 8 | Vitaly Kasperovich (BLR) | 8.956 |

=== Parallel bars ===
| Rank | Gymnast | Total |
|---|---|---|
| 1st place, gold medalist(s) | Zhang Jinjing (CHN) | 9.775 |
| 2nd place, silver medalist(s) | Li Xiaopeng (CHN) | 9.737 |
| 3rd place, bronze medalist(s) | Naoya Tsukahara (JPN) | 9.562 |
| 4 | Sergei Kharkov (GER) | 9.500 |
| 5 | Mitja Petkovšek (SLO) | 9.487 |
| 6 | Ivan Ivankov (BLR) | 9.450 |
| 7 | Jesús Carballo (ESP) | 9.325 |
| 8 | Alexander Shostak (BLR) | 9.262 |

=== Horizontal bar ===
| Rank | Gymnast | Total |
|---|---|---|
| 1st place, gold medalist(s) | Jani Tanskanen (FIN) | 9.700 |
| 2nd place, silver medalist(s) | Jesús Carballo (ESP) | 9.675 |
| 3rd place, bronze medalist(s) | Alexander Beresh (UKR) | 9.625 |
| 4 | Evgeny Zhukov (RUS) | 9.562 |
| 5 | Yoshiaki Hatakeda (JPN) | 9.312 |
| 6 | Sergei Fedorchenko (KAZ) | 8.850 |
| 7 | Ivan Ivankov (BLR) | 8.762 |
| 8 | Marius Urzică (ROU) | 8.750 |

== Women ==
=== Team ===
| Rank | Team | Vault (gymnastics) | Uneven bars | Balance beam | Floor (gymnastics) | Total |
|---|---|---|---|---|---|---|
| 1st place, gold medalist(s) | Romania | 38.236 (1) | 38.348 (2) | 38.475 (1) | 38.661 (2) | 153.720 |
| 1st place, gold medalist(s) | Simona Amânar | 9.681 | 9.712 | 9.525 | 9.737 | 153.720 |
| 1st place, gold medalist(s) | Claudia Presăcan | 9.481 | 9.687 | 9.675 | 9.562 | 153.720 |
| 1st place, gold medalist(s) | Gina Gogean | 9.587 | 8.100 | 9.725 | 9.787 | 153.720 |
| 1st place, gold medalist(s) | Alexandra Marinescu | 9.487 | 9.587 | 9.550 | 9.287 | 153.720 |
| 1st place, gold medalist(s) | Corina Ungureanu | 9.306 | | 9.300 | 9.575 | 153.720 |
| 1st place, gold medalist(s) | Mirela Țugurlan | | 9.362 | | | 153.720 |
| 2nd place, silver medalist(s) | Russia | 37.998 (2) | 38.274 (3) | 38.250 (2) | 38.675 (1) | 153.197 |
| 2nd place, silver medalist(s) | Svetlana Khorkina | 9.637 | 9.762 | 9.700 | 9.775 | 153.197 |
| 2nd place, silver medalist(s) | Yelena Produnova | 9.431 | 9.525 | 9.700 | 9.550 | 153.197 |
| 2nd place, silver medalist(s) | Yevgeniya Kuznetsova | 9.443 | 9.525 | 9.475 | 9.675 | 153.197 |
| 2nd place, silver medalist(s) | Svetlana Bakhtina | | 9.462 | 9.375 | 9.675 | 153.197 |
| 2nd place, silver medalist(s) | Elena Dolgopolova | 9.487 | 9.225 | | | 153.197 |
| 2nd place, silver medalist(s) | Elena Grosheva | 8.950 | | 9.200 | 9.387 | 153.197 |
| 3rd place, bronze medalist(s) | China | 37.655 (4) | 38.774 (1) | 38.111 (3) | 37.461 (5) | 152.001 |
| 3rd place, bronze medalist(s) | Liu Xuan | 9.512 | 9.737 | 9.512 | 9.625 | 152.001 |
| 3rd place, bronze medalist(s) | Kui Yuanyuan | 9.018 | 9.575 | 9.687 | 9.500 | 152.001 |
| 3rd place, bronze medalist(s) | Meng Fei | 9.406 | 9.687 | 8.625 | 9.662 | 152.001 |
| 3rd place, bronze medalist(s) | Bi Wenjing | | 9.800 | 9.462 | | 152.001 |
| 3rd place, bronze medalist(s) | Mo Huilan | 9.325 | 9.562 | 9.325 | 8.837 | 152.001 |
| 3rd place, bronze medalist(s) | Zhou Duan | 9.437 | | | 8.837 | 152.001 |
| 4 | Ukraine | 36.992 (5) | 38.174 (4) | 37.262 (4) | 38.375 (3) | 150.803 |
| 4 | Liubov Sheremeta | 9.306 | 9.625 | 9.175 | 9.750 | 150.803 |
| 4 | Olga Teslenko | 9.293 | 9.725 | 9.150 | 9.625 | 150.803 |
| 4 | Inha Shkarupa | 9.200 | 9.362 | 9.412 | 9.675 | 150.803 |
| 4 | Galina Tyryk | 9.193 | 9.462 | 9.525 | 9.325 | 150.803 |
| 5 | France | 36.860 (6) | 37.049 (5) | 36.649 (5) | 37.811 (4) | 148.369 |
| 5 | Isabelle Severino | 9.462 | 9.562 | 9.025 | 9.612 | 148.369 |
| 5 | Elvire Teza | 9.193 | 9.400 | 9.375 | 9.237 | 148.369 |
| 5 | Magalie Ruffato | 9.012 | 9.025 | 8.837 | 9.312 | 148.369 |
| 5 | Ludivine Furnon | 9.193 | 8.862 | 9.412 | 9.650 | 148.369 |
| 5 | Emilie Volle | 8.912 | 9.062 | | | 148.369 |
| 5 | Cecile Canqueteau | | | 8.825 | | 148.369 |
| 6 | United States | 37.687 (3) | 36.212 (6) | 36.636 (6) | 37.362 (6) | 147.897 |
| 6 | Kristy Powell | 9.231 | 9.350 | 9.075 | 9.125 | 147.897 |
| 6 | Kristen Maloney | 9.556 | 9.287 | 9.537 | 8.700 | 147.897 |
| 6 | Kendall Beck | 9.450 | | 9.387 | 9.225 | 147.897 |
| 6 | Dominique Moceanu | 9.093 | 8.800 | 8.637 | 9.512 | 147.897 |
| 6 | Mohini Bhardwaj | 9.450 | 8.775 | | | 147.897 |
| 6 | Jennie Thompson | | 8.175 | 8.000 | 9.500 | 147.897 |

=== All-around ===
| Rank | Gymnast | Vault (gymnastics) | Uneven bars | Balance beam | Floor (gymnastics) | Total |
|---|---|---|---|---|---|---|
| 1st place, gold medalist(s) | Svetlana Khorkina (RUS) | 9.549 | 9.850 | 9.562 | 9.675 | 38.636 |
| 2nd place, silver medalist(s) | Simona Amânar (ROU) | 9.675 | 9.387 | 9.750 | 9.775 | 38.587 |
| 3rd place, bronze medalist(s) | Yelena Produnova (RUS) | 9.412 | 9.687 | 9.750 | 9.700 | 38.549 |
| 4 | Gina Gogean (ROU) | 9.618 | 9.375 | 9.800 | 9.750 | 38.543 |
| 5 | Meng Fei (CHN) | 9.418 | 9.637 | 9.375 | 9.612 | 38.042 |
| 6 | Liubov Sheremeta (UKR) | 9.256 | 9.637 | 9.425 | 9.575 | 37.893 |
| 7 | Liu Xuan (CHN) | 9.237 | 9.675 | 9.412 | 9.537 | 37.861 |
| 8 | Claudia Presăcan (ROU) | 9.443 | 8.937 | 9.675 | 9.662 | 37.717 |
| 9 | Olga Teslenko (UKR) | 8.806 | 9.550 | 9.662 | 9.587 | 37.605 |
| 10 | Isabelle Severino (FRA) | 9.312 | 9.612 | 8.950 | 9.425 | 37.299 |
| 11 | Kui Yuanyuan (CHN) | 9.487 | 8.937 | 9.612 | 9.262 | 37.298 |
| 12 | Inha Shkarupa (UKR) | 9.318 | 9.537 | 8.712 | 9.650 | 37.217 |
| 13 | Kristen Maloney (USA) | 9.443 | 8.862 | 9.487 | 9.262 | 37.054 |
| 14 | Dominique Moceanu (USA) | 9.249 | 9.050 | 9.237 | 9.425 | 36.961 |
| 15 | Alena Polozkova (BLR) | 9.250 | 9.237 | 8.762 | 9.537 | 36.786 |
| 16 | Yevgeniya Kuznetsova (RUS) | 8.493 | 8.875 | 9.687 | 9.675 | 36.730 |
| 17 | Irina Evdokimova (KAZ) | 9.168 | 8.862 | 9.062 | 9.500 | 36.592 |
| 18 | Adrienn Varga (HUN) | 9.037 | 9.162 | 9.250 | 9.100 | 36.549 |
| 19 | Elvire Teza (FRA) | 9.124 | 8.787 | 9.500 | 9.100 | 36.511 |
| 20 | Yvonne Tousek (CAN) | 9.187 | 9.600 | 8.262 | 9.412 | 36.461 |
| 21 | Elena Savko (BLR) | 9.206 | 8.662 | 8.787 | 9.500 | 36.155 |
| 22 | Ludivine Furnon (FRA) | 9.006 | 8.637 | 9.162 | 9.325 | 36.130 |
| 23 | Kristy Powell (USA) | 9.337 | 9.137 | 8.525 | 9.100 | 36.099 |
| 24 | Sarah Deegan (CAN) | 9.100 | 8.987 | 8.400 | 9.450 | 35.937 |
| 25 | Risa Sugawara (JPN) | 8.949 | 8.925 | 8.775 | 9.200 | 35.849 |
| 26 | Svetlana Bakhridinova (UZB) | 9.362 | 9.362 | 7.625 | 9.450 | 35.799 |
| 27 | Yvonne Pioch (GER) | 8.900 | 9.075 | 9.500 | 8.237 | 35.712 |
| 28 | Veronique Leclerc (CAN) | 9.262 | 9.275 | 8.137 | 8.950 | 35.624 |
| 29 | Lisa Skinner (AUS) | 8.981 | 8.812 | 9.000 | 8.750 | 35.543 |
| 30 | Elena Piskun (BLR) | 8.962 | 9.162 | 9.025 | 8.325 | 35.474 |
| 31 | Masumi Okawa (JPN) | 8.906 | 8.525 | 8.837 | 9.000 | 35.268 |
| 32 | Alexandra Gordeeva (UZB) | 8.887 | 8.550 | 8.550 | 9.275 | 35.262 |
| 33 | Anastasia Dzyundzyak (UZB) | 9.168 | 8.862 | 8.400 | 8.800 | 35.230 |
| 34 | Rebecca Wilson (AUS) | 8.499 | 8.612 | 8.850 | 9.200 | 35.161 |
| 35 | Mok Un-ju (PRK) | 8.918 | 8.025 | 8.837 | 8.762 | 34.542 |
| 36 | Vasiliki Tsavdaridou (GRE) | 4.212 | 8.975 | 8.837 | 9.525 | 31.549 |

=== Vault ===
| Rank | Gymnast | Total |
|---|---|---|
| 1st place, gold medalist(s) | Simona Amânar (ROU) | 9.712 |
| 2nd place, silver medalist(s) | Zhou Duan (CHN) | 9.606 |
| 3rd place, bronze medalist(s) | Gina Gogean (ROU) | 9.600 |
| 4 | Adrienn Varga (HUN) | 9.543 |
| 5 | Mohini Bhardwaj (USA) | 9.512 |
| 6 | Kui Yuanyuan (CHN) | 9.350 |
| 7 | Elena Dolgopolova (RUS) | 9.331 |
| 8 | Svetlana Khorkina (RUS) | 4.537 |

=== Uneven bars ===
| Rank | Gymnast | Total |
|---|---|---|
| 1st place, gold medalist(s) | Svetlana Khorkina (RUS) | 9.875 |
| 2nd place, silver medalist(s) | Meng Fei (CHN) | 9.800 |
| 3rd place, bronze medalist(s) | Bi Wenjing (CHN) | 9.787 |
| 4 | Liubov Sheremeta (UKR) | 9.750 |
| 5 | Claudia Presăcan (ROU) | 9.725 |
| 6 | Alexandra Marinescu (ROU) | 9.712 |
| 7 | Olga Teslenko (UKR) | 9.675 |
| 8 | Yevgeniya Kuznetsova (RUS) | 9.412 |

=== Balance beam ===
| Rank | Gymnast | Total |
|---|---|---|
| 1st place, gold medalist(s) | Gina Gogean (ROU) | 9.800 |
| 2nd place, silver medalist(s) | Svetlana Khorkina (RUS) | 9.787 |
| 3rd place, bronze medalist(s) | Kui Yuanyuan (CHN) | 9.787 |
| 4 | Ludivine Furnon (FRA) | 9.725 |
| 5 | Olga Teslenko (UKR) | 9.662 |
| 6 | Elvire Teza (FRA) | 9.650 |
| 7 | Kristen Maloney (USA) | 9.512 |
| 8 | Yelena Produnova (RUS) | 9.412 |

=== Floor exercise ===
| Rank | Gymnast | Total |
|---|---|---|
| 1st place, gold medalist(s) | Gina Gogean (ROU) | 9.800 |
| 2nd place, silver medalist(s) | Svetlana Khorkina (RUS) | 9.800 |
| 3rd place, bronze medalist(s) | Yelena Produnova (RUS) | 9.775 |
| 4 | Meng Fei (CHN) | 9.675 |
| 5 | Vasiliki Tsavdaridou (GRE) | 9.650 |
| 6 | Claudia Presăcan (ROU) | 9.600 |
| 7 | Liubov Sheremeta (UKR) | 8.937 |
| 8 | Zhou Duan (CHN) | 8.787 |
