= 1996 Asian Artistic Gymnastics Championships =

International artistic gymnastics competition

- Dates: September

The 1996 Asian Artistic Gymnastics Championships were the first edition of the Asian Artistic Gymnastics Championships, and were held in Changsha, China, in September 1996.

== Medal summary ==
=== Men ===
Event	Gold	Silver	Bronze
Team	China	South Korea	Japan
Individual all-around	Shen Jian; China	Fan Hongbin; China	Cheng Liang; China
Floor	Shen Jian; China	Fan Hongbin; China	Sergey Fedorchenko; Kazakhstan
Pommel horse	Han Yoon-soo; South Korea	Shared gold	Wu Chin-chan; Chinese Taipei
Pommel horse	Kim Hyon-il; North Korea	Shared gold	Wu Chin-chan; Chinese Taipei
Rings	Fan Hongbin; China	Huang Xu; China	Amornthep Waewsang; Thailand
Vault	Sergey Fedorchenko; Kazakhstan	Yeo Hong-chul; South Korea	Tung Nien-kuang; Chinese Taipei
Parallel bars	Huang Xu; China	Jong U-chol; North Korea	Shen Jian; China
Horizontal bar	Cheng Liang; China	Shen Jian; China	Han Yoon-soo; South Korea

=== Women ===
Event	Gold	Silver	Bronze
Team	China	North Korea	South Korea
Individual all-around	Mao Yanling; China	Ji Liya; China	Oksana Chusovitina; Uzbekistan
Vault	Ji Liya; China	Oksana Chusovitina; Uzbekistan	Zhou Duan; China
Uneven bars	Zhou Duan; China	Oksana Chusovitina; Uzbekistan	Mao Yanling; China
Balance beam	Mao Yanling; China	Shared gold	Ji Liya; China
Balance beam	Mok Un-ju; North Korea	Shared gold	Ji Liya; China
Floor	Meng Fei; China	Oksana Chusovitina; Uzbekistan	Ji Liya; China

== Medal table ==
Rank	Nation	Gold	Silver	Bronze	Total
1	China	12	5	6	23
2	North Korea	2	2	0	4
3	South Korea	1	2	2	5
4	Kazakhstan	1	0	1	2
5	Uzbekistan	0	3	1	4
6	Chinese Taipei	0	0	2	2
7	Japan	0	0	1	1
7	Thailand	0	0	1	1
Totals (8 entries)		16	12	14	42
