= Zhou Duan =

Chinese artistic gymnast

- Born: 10 March 1980 (age 46)

Gymnastics career
- Discipline: Women's artistic gymnastics
- Country represented: China
Medal record
Representing China
World Championships
Silver medal – second place	1997 Lausanne	Vault
Bronze medal – third place	1997 Lausanne	Team
Asian Championships
Gold medal – first place	1996 Changsha	Team
Gold medal – first place	1996 Changsha	Uneven bars
Bronze medal – third place	1996 Changsha	Vault

Zhou Duan (born 10 March 1980) is a Chinese former artistic gymnast. At the 1997 World Championships, she won a silver medal on vault and a bronze medal with the Chinese team. She is the 1996 Asian champion on the uneven bars.

== Career ==
Zhou competed with the Chinese team that won the gold medal at the 1996 Asian Championships. Individually, she won a bronze medal on the vault behind teammate Ji Liya and Uzbekistan's Oksana Chusovitina, and she won a gold medal on the uneven bars. She won a bronze medal in the all-around at the 1996 China Cup behind Meng Fei and Maria Olaru. She also competed at the 1996 Pacific Rim Championships and finished ninth in the all-around.

Zhou helped China win a 1997 friendly meet against Bulgaria and Switzerland. At the 1997 East Asian Games she became the first female gymnast to perform the Gaylord II element – a forward tucked salto over high bar with ½ twist – on the uneven bars. She won a gold medal on the floor exercise at the 1997 Rome Grand Prix. She was selected for the 1997 World Championships team alongside Liu Xuan, Kui Yuanyuan, Meng Fei, Bi Wenjing, and Mo Huilan. They won the bronze medal in the team competition behind Romania and Russia, with Zhou contributing scores on the vault and the floor exercise. She then won a silver medal in the vault final behind Romania's Simona Amânar with a score of 9.606. She also competed in the floor exercise final but finished eighth with a score of 8.787.

Zhou did not compete internationally for China after the 1997 World Championships. After retiring from gymnastics, she became a student at Beijing Sport University.
