= Svetlana Bakhtina (gymnast) =

Russian artistic gymnast

Personal information
- Born: 24 June 1976 (age 50) Voronezh, Russia

Sport
- Sport: Artistic gymnastics
- Club: Dynamo Sports Club
Medal record
Representing Russia
World Championships
Silver medal – second place	1997 Lausanne	Team

Svetlana Anatolievna Bakhtina (Russian: Светлана Анатольевна Бахтина, born 26 September 1980) is a retired Russian artistic gymnast. She won a team silver medal at the 1997 World Artistic Gymnastics Championships.

Bakhtina took up gymnastics aged 4. In 2002 she graduated from the Voronezh Institute of Physical Education, and later worked as a gymnastics coach in Voronezh.
