= Jennifer Bricker =

American acrobat born without legs

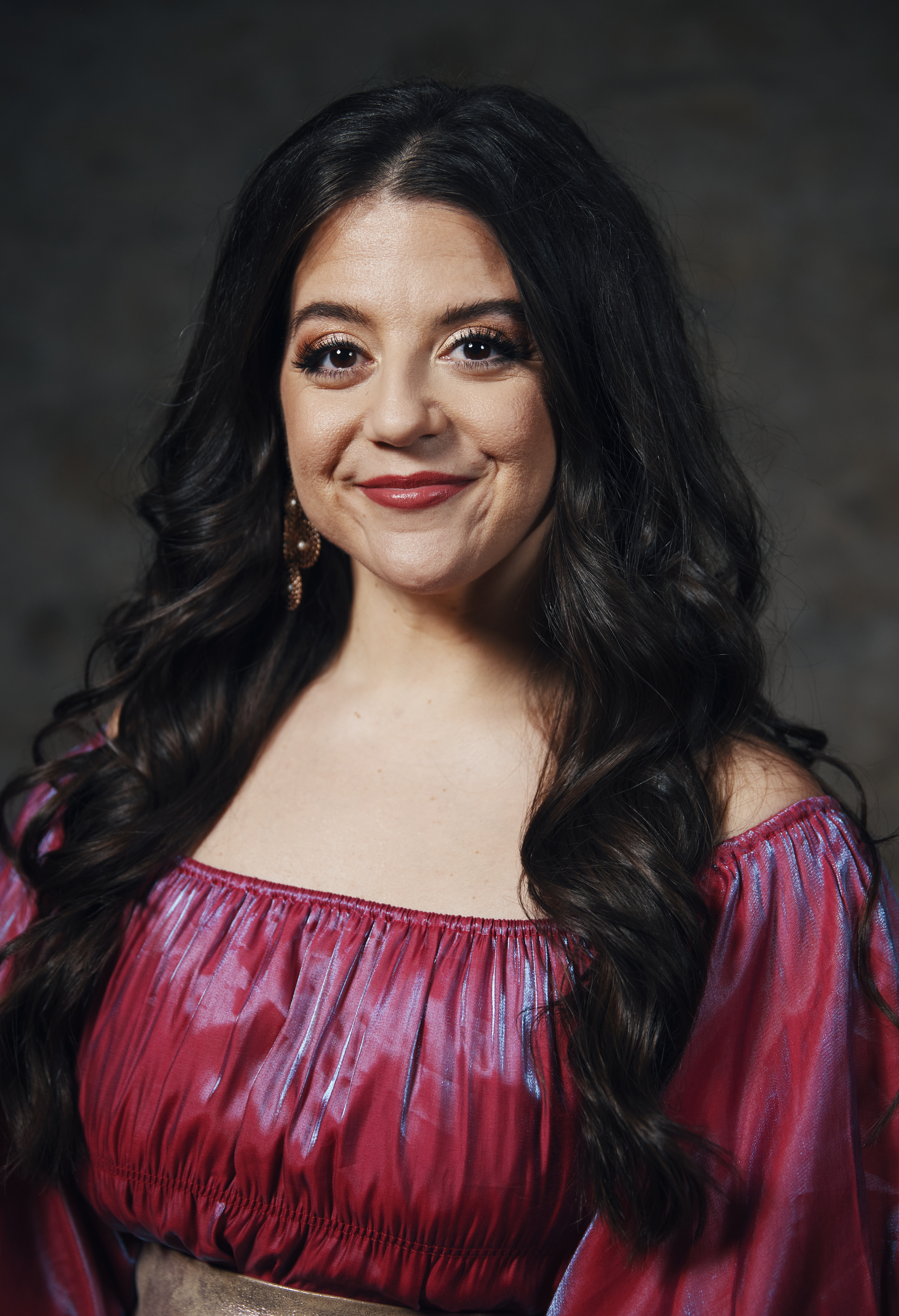
- Bricker at SXSW 2024
- Born: Jennifer Bricker; October 1, 1987 (age 39)
- Other names: Jen Bricker; Jen Bricker-Bauer; Jennifer Bricker-Bauer
- Occupations: Acrobat, aerialist
- Relatives: Dominique Moceanu (sister)
- Website: jenbricker.com

Jennifer Bricker-Bauer (née Bricker; born October 1, 1987) is an American acrobat, aerialist, and memoirist. Born without legs, she was placed for adoption by her parents.

== Early life ==
Jennifer Bricker was born on October 1, 1987, with no legs. She was adopted by George and Sharon Bricker of Hardinville, Illinois. She grew up with three older brothers.

Her adoption was closed, but her birth parents' names were on some documents. During the 1996 Olympics, the cameras cut to the parents of gymnast Dominique Moceanu and the Brickers made the connection. When she was 16, Bricker asked her adoptive parents if they knew anything about her birth family and they told her about Dominique. Enlisting the assistance of a private investigator uncle, Jennifer Bricker got in touch with her biological parents. She spent four years trying to get in touch with her sister. Bricker met with Dominique and her other sister, Christina Moceanu, in person for the first time in 2008. The Moceanu family is ethnically Aromanian, from modern Romania.

The sisters went public with their story in 2012. Moceanu's memoir, Off Balance, tells her side of the story in learning that Bricker was her younger sister who had been placed for adoption at the hospital at birth. Before learning Moceanu was her sister, Bricker idolized her, and even had posters of her on her bedroom walls. The documentaries Eva Longoria's Versus: Romanian Roots (2015, a spinoff of ESPN's 30 for 30) and She Looks Like Me (2024) from director Torquil Jones tells the story of the two sisters discovering their connection.

== Career ==
Bricker grew up competing in gymnastics alongside teammates who did not have disabilities. At age of 10, she competed in the Junior Olympics. In 1998, Bricker competed in the AAU Junior Olympics (power tumbling), placing fourth. The same year she received the U.S. Tumbling Association’s Inspiration Award. She was the first disabled high school tumbling champion in the state of Illinois.

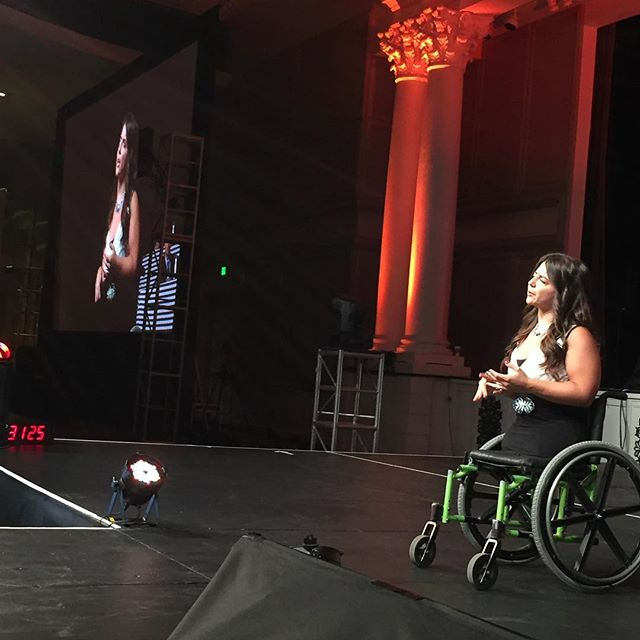
Bricker addressing an audience at the Cydcor 2015 National Conference, Nashville, TN.

After taking a break from tumbling, Bricker began performing in aerial acrobatics and trampoline around 2008. With performer Nate Crawford, she co-choreographed and performed in a trampoline show at the Amway Center in Orlando during the 2008 Mascot Games. They ceased performing the show when Crawford was cast in Britney Spears' Circus Tour (2009). This exposed Bricker to the show's producers and she became featured performer on the Circus tour, appearing in 40 shows across North America and Australia. She has also performed in Cirque du Soleil’s Las Vegas show, Club Light.

Her story is detailed in her memoir Everything Is Possible: Finding the Faith and Courage to Follow Your Dreams, which was a New York Times bestseller. Writing in Psychology Today, Nancy L. Segal noted, "The sisters' reunion makes for an inspiring story of family ties broken and restored. But it also provides priceless material for research into the roles of nature and nurture in athletic prowess".

In 2022, Bricker performed in Omnium Circus's live show, I’mPossible. She is an inductee into the World Acrobatic Society's Gallery of Legends Hall of Fame.

== Personal life ==
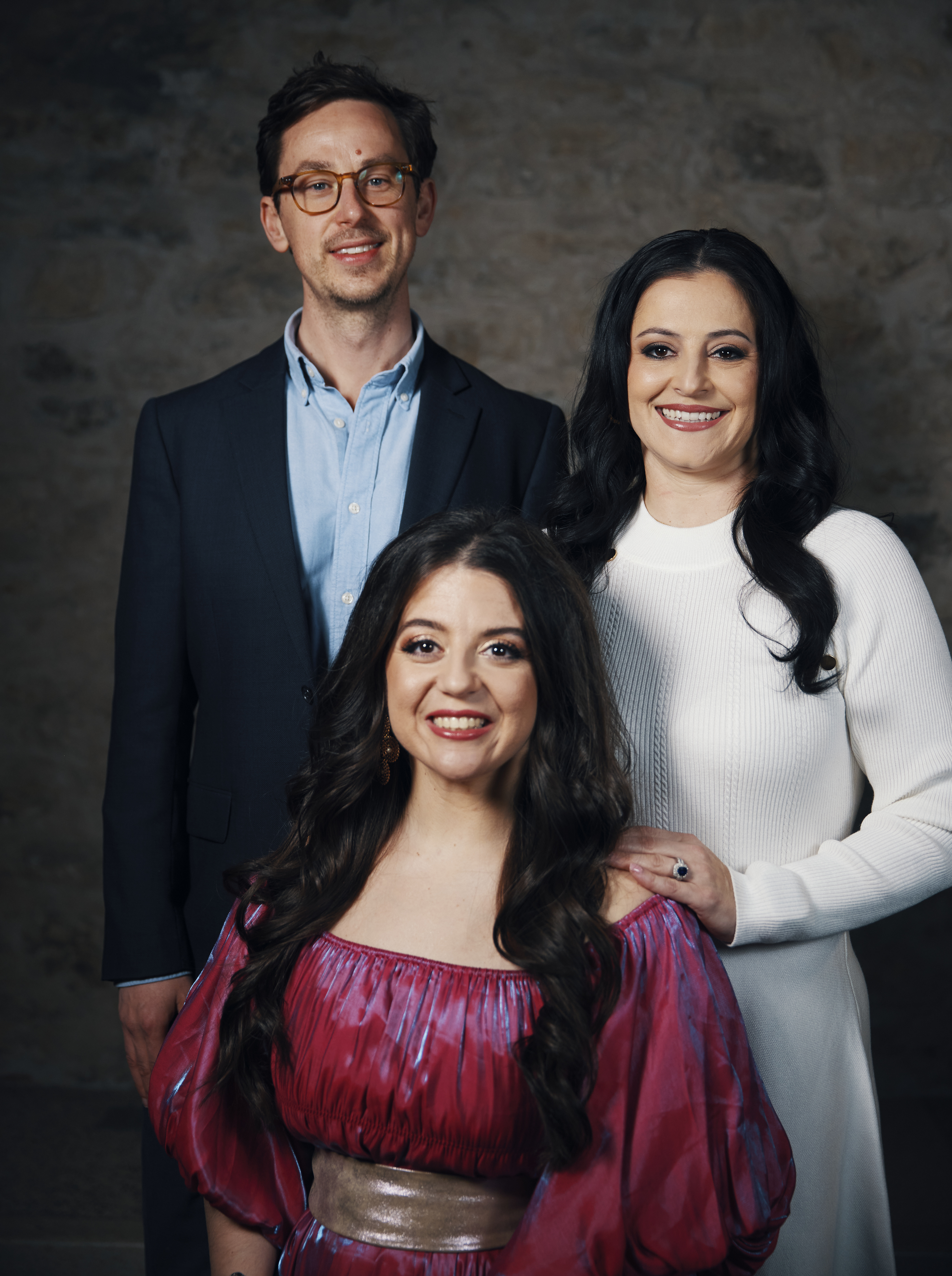
She Looks Like Me cast and crew at SXSW 2024. Torquil Jones, Jen Bricker–Bauer, and Dominique Moceanu.

Bricker married Austrian-born Dominik Bauer in 2019, becoming Jennifer Bricker-Bauer. She gave birth to a son, Malachi Bauer, in 2023.
