= Mike Dutka =

American artistic gymnast

- Full name: Michael Dutka
- Born: February 6, 1978 (age 48) Philadelphia, Pennsylvania, U.S.
- Height: 5 ft 5 in (165 cm)

Gymnastics career
- Discipline: Men's artistic gymnastics
- Country represented: United States (1997–2002)
- College team: Penn State Nittany Lions
- Gym: Team Gattaca – HGA; Gymnastrum; Macey's Gymnastics
- Head coach: Kevin Mazeika
- Former coaches: Randy Jepson, Joe Stallone, Macey Watson
Medal record
Men's artistic gymnastics
Representing United States
Event	1st	2nd	3rd
Pan American Games	0	1	0
Pan American Championships	0	1	0
Total	0	2	0
Pan American Games
Silver medal – second place	1999 Winnipeg	Team
Pan American Championships
Silver medal – second place	1997 Medellín	Team

Michael Dutka (born February 6, 1978) is a retired American artistic gymnast. He was a member of the United States men's national artistic gymnastics team and won a silver medal at the 1999 Pan American Games. He competed collegiately for the Penn State Nittany Lions.

== Early life and education ==
Dutka was born on February 6, 1978, to Michael and Peggy Dutka in Philadelphia, Pennsylvania. He grew up in Fairless Hills, Pennsylvania and started gymnastics in 1984 at Macey's Academy of Gymnastics in Feasterville, Pennsylvania. As he grew older, he joined many gyms before commuting to Allentown, Pennsylvania to train gymnastics under Joe Stallone as a member of Gymnastrum. He was also trained by Macey Watson. He attended Bishop Egan High School and upon graduation enrolled at Pennsylvania State University to pursue gymnastics.

== Gymnastics career ==
Dutka was a United States junior national team member for five years from 1991 to 1996. While still in high school, Dutka competed at the 1992 Junior Pan American Artistic Gymnastics Championships in São Paulo and won four individual gold medals, a team gold medal, and an individual bronze medal. Dutka's 5 total gold medals set a Junior Pan Am Games record.

Dutka became the youngest elite-level athlete to compete when he appeared at the 1993 Winter Cup. Later that year he won Junior Boys National Gymnastics Champion. He spent nine months training at the United States Olympic Training Center.

From 1997 to 1998, Dutka was a member of the Penn State Nittany Lions men's gymnastics team. He was named the 1997 Big Ten Conference Freshman Gymnast of the Year. He left Penn State after two years to join Team Texaco and train at Houston Gymnastics Academy under Kevin Mazeika in hopes of making the 2000 Summer Olympics team.

On the international stage, Dutka represented the United States at the 1997 Pan American Gymnastics Championships in Medellín and won a silver medal in the team all-around. He was also a member of the 5th-placed United States team at the 1997 World Artistic Gymnastics Championships. Representing the United States at the 1999 Pan American Games, Dutka won a silver medal in the team all-around.

== Post-athletic career ==
Dutka is currently a co-owner of and coach at American Flip Factory in Huntsville, Texas. He previously coached alongside Jim Culhane Jr. at Texas Star Gymnastics in Tomball, Texas.
