= Ukraine at the 1998 Goodwill Games =

- IOC code: UKR

in New York City 19 July - 2 August 1998
- Medals Ranked 14th: Gold 1 Silver 5 Bronze 4 Total 10

Summer appearances
- 1994; 1998; 2001

Ukraine competed at the 1998 Goodwill Games in New York City, United States, from 19 July to 2 August 1998.

The Ukrainian swimmer Denys Sylantyev represented World All-Stars, winning two gold medals in the 100 and 200 metres butterfly and a bronze one in the 4 x 100 metres medley relay.

== Medalists ==
Medal	Name	Sport	Event
Gold	Olena Vitrychenko	Rhythmic gymnastics	Rope
Silver	Olga Teslenko	Artistic gymnastics	Balance beam
Silver	Zhanna Pintusevich	Athletics	100 metres
Silver	Zhanna Pintusevich	Athletics	200 metres
Silver	Olena Vitrychenko	Rhythmic gymnastics	Individual all-around
Silver	Olena Zhupina; Svitlana Serbina	Diving	10 metres synchro
Bronze	Olena Hrushyna; Ruslan Honcharov	Figure skating	Ice dancing
Bronze	Olena Vitrychenko	Rhythmic gymnastics	Hoop
Bronze	Valentina Fedyushina	Athletics	Shot put
