= 1992 Junior Pan American Artistic Gymnastics Championships =

International sports competition

Junior Pan American Artistic Gymnastics Championships
- Location: São Paulo, Brazil
- Date: December 8–14, 1992

The 1992 Junior Pan American Artistic Gymnastics Championships was held in São Paulo, Brazil, December 8–14, 1992.

== Medal summary ==
=== Junior division ===
Event	Gold	Silver	Bronze
Women
Team	Canada; Marilou Cousineau; Teresa Wolf; Jenni Chung	United States; Lanna Apisukh; Melissa Green; Leila Pallardy	Brazil; Silvia Mendes; Soraya Carvalho
All Around	Vanessa Baglietti (ARG)	Lanna Apisukh (USA)	Silvia Mendes (BRA)
Vault	Annia Portuondo (CUB)	Silvia Mendes (BRA)	Melissa Green (USA)
Uneven bars	Melissa Green (USA)	Lanna Apisukh (USA)	Marilou Cousineau (CAN)
Balance beam	Soraya Carvalho (BRA)	Lanna Apisukh (USA)	Jenni Chung (CAN)
Floor exercise	Silvia Mendes (BRA)	Melissa Green (USA)	Lanna Apisukh (USA)
Men
Team	Canada; Travis Romagnoli; Eric Saintonge; Darcy Wittenburg	United States; Jeremy Killen; Timothy Dalrymple; Gewin Sincharoen	Argentina; Marcelo Palacio; Fernando Vázquez
All Around	Roberto Aldatzabal (CUB)	Diego Lizardi (PUR)	Travis Romagnoli (CAN)
Floor exercise	Jeremy Killen (USA)	Diego Lizardi (PUR)	Marcelo Palacio (ARG)
Pommel horse	Roberto Aldatzabal (CUB)	Gewin Sincharoen (USA)	Eric Saintonge (CAN)
Rings	Roberto Aldatzabal (CUB)	Marcelo Palacio (ARG)	Jeremy Killen (USA)
Vault	Diego Lizardi (PUR)	Eric Saintonge (CAN) Travis Romagnoli (CAN)	—N/a
Parallel bars	Charley Malewschik (BRA) Travis Romagnoli (CAN)	—N/a	Jeremy Killen (USA)
Horizontal bar	Roberto Aldatzabal (CUB)	Travis Romagnoli (CAN)	Diego Lizardi (PUR) Jeremy Killen (USA)

=== Children division ===
Event	Gold	Silver	Bronze
Women
Team	United States; Jennie Thompson; Dominique Moceanu	Canada; Yvonne Tousek; Melissa LeClerc; Krista Lovejoy	Argentina; Natalia Perezmendy; Simone Aldana
All Around	Jennie Thompson (USA)	Dominique Moceanu (USA)	Yvonne Tousek (CAN)
Vault	Dominique Moceanu (USA)	Yvonne Tousek (CAN)	Natalia Perezmendy (ARG)
Uneven bars	Dominique Moceanu (USA)	Jennie Thompson (USA)	Yvonne Tousek (CAN)
Balance beam	Jennie Thompson (USA)	Melissa LeClerc (CAN)	Simone Aldana (ARG)
Floor exercise	Dominique Moceanu (USA)	Simone Aldana (ARG) Yvonne Tousek (CAN)	—N/a
Men
Team	United States; Mike Dutka; Derek Leiter; Jay Nardelli	Canada; Steven Bruyega; Martin Fournier; Chris Weeden	Mexico; Luis Trevino; Jose Cesar; Julio Cantu
All Around	Mike Dutka (USA)	Steven Bruyega (CAN)	Derek Leiter (USA)
Floor exercise	Mike Dutka (USA)	Ruben Fernandez (ARG) Derek Leiter (USA)	—N/a
Pommel horse	Derek Leiter (USA)	Steven Bruyega (CAN)	Mike Dutka (USA)
Rings	Steven Bruyega (CAN)	Derek Leiter (USA)	Luis Trevino (MEX)
Vault	Mike Dutka (USA)	Julio Cantu (MEX)	Eric Pedercini (ARG) Derek Leiter (USA)
Parallel bars	Jorge Hugo Giraldo (COL)	Derek Leiter (USA)	Raony Kesselring (BRA)
Horizontal bar	Mike Dutka (USA)	Martin Fournier (CAN)	Eric Pedercini (ARG)

== Medal table ==
Rank	Nation	Gold	Silver	Bronze	Total
1	United States	14	12	8	34
2	Cuba	5	0	0	5
3	Canada	4	11	6	21
4	Brazil	3	1	3	7
5	Argentina	1	3	7	11
6	Puerto Rico	1	2	1	4
7	Colombia	1	0	0	1
8	Mexico	0	1	2	3
Totals (8 entries)		29	30	27	86
