= U.S. Olympic Festival =

American multi-sport event

The U.S. Olympic Festival was a multi-sport event held in the United States by the United States Olympic Committee in the years between the Olympic Games. It was started in 1978 as an American counterpart to the communist Spartakiad – a similar event held on a quadrennial basis by the former Soviet Union and its former satellite in East Germany. As the competitive position of U.S. athletes in the Olympics slipped relative to that of the Soviets and East Germans, American sports leaders determined that the U.S. needed to found some kind of multi-sports event to simulate the Olympic experience. It was originally called the National Sports Festival until the name was changed in 1986. It was the nation's largest junior sporting event until it ended in 1995.

== History ==
The idea of a National Sports Festival was originally conceived by Robert Kane, who first publicly discussed the idea while attending the 1976 Summer Olympics in Montreal, Canada, as executive vice president of the U.S. Olympic Committee. Kane said he had been working on the concept for over a decade before that. The event was intended to allow American athletes to develop in a setting similar to that of international competitions like the Olympics, particularly female athletes who had fewer opportunities to do so. Kane believed this was necessary for Americans to compete with countries with state support for Olympic athletes and more regular youth sporting events, particularly the Soviet Union and East Germany, which were starting to surpass the United States in many Olympic events at the time.

After Kane was elected president of the USOC in April 1977, the committee began to discuss the notion of holding such a festival every summer, except during Olympic years. The first edition of the National Sports Festival was announced in November 1977, seven months before it would take place. It would be held in July 1978 in Colorado Springs, Colorado, where the USOC had recently built its first national Olympic Training Center and was relocating its headquarters there from New York City. The second annual edition of the festival, in 1979, was the first to receive live television coverage. NBC purchased the broadcast rights for $500,000, covering much of the event's operating costs.

When the United States announced it would boycott the 1980 Summer Olympics to be held in the Soviet Union, the USOC considered holding an extra edition of the National Sports Festival to allow American athletes to still compete that summer. However, due to fears that trying to create an alternative Olympics would permanently damage relations with the International Olympic Committee, and concerns that staging an event of Olympic scale with only a few months to prepare would be impractical, the idea was soon dropped. Instead, two smaller-scale events were held that summer, the Liberty Bell Classic track-and-field meet in Philadelphia and the U.S. Gymnastics Federation International Invitational in Hartford, Connecticut.

During the 1985 Festival, the USOC announced that future editions of the event would be renamed to the "U.S. Olympic Festival". The name change was intended to make the association between the Festival and the Olympic Games more obvious, and to encourage more interest in the event.

Changes in national and international sporting and geopolitics made the Olympic Festival less significant over time. The end of the Cold War and the collapse of the Soviet Union in 1991 eliminated part of the event's original purpose. An overall growth in youth sporting competitions in the United States, such as those represented by the National Congress of State Games, created competition for the Olympic Festival. The quality of competition at the Festival became inconsistent, with some sports featuring the top American athletes and others having only young upstarts in need of development. The IOC's decision in 1986 to stagger the Winter Olympics in even-numbered years between the Summer Olympics meant that the U.S. Olympic Festival could be held only in odd-numbered years after 1994, reducing it from three events in each four-year period to two.

During the 1995 Festival, the USOC voted to cancel its plans for the 1997 event, which had not been awarded to a host city yet, stating that there was not enough time to prepare. USOC members agreed that the Olympic Festival needed a change in focus, but could not agree on what changes should be made.

== Editions ==
	Year	Location	Sources
1	1978	Colorado Springs, Colorado	
2	1979	Colorado Springs, Colorado	
1980 Summer Olympics in Moscow, Russian SFSR, Soviet Union (boycotted by the United States)
3	1981	Syracuse, New York	
4	1982	Indianapolis, Indiana	
5	1983	Colorado Springs, Colorado	
1984 Summer Olympics in Los Angeles, California, United States
6	1985	Baton Rouge, Louisiana	
7	1986	Houston, Texas	
8	1987	Raleigh-Durham, North Carolina	
1988 Summer Olympics in Seoul, South Korea
9	1989	Oklahoma City, Oklahoma	
10	1990	Minneapolis, Minnesota	
11	1991	Los Angeles, California	
1992 Summer Olympics in Barcelona, Catalonia, Spain
12	1993	San Antonio, Texas	
13	1994	St. Louis, Missouri	
14	1995	Boulder, Colorado	
