= Ukraine at the 1994 Goodwill Games =

- IOC code: UKR

in Saint Petersburg 23 July - 7 August 1994
- Medals Ranked 6th: Gold 8 Silver 3 Bronze 11 Total 22

Summer appearances
- 1994; 1998; 2001

Ukraine competed at the 1994 Goodwill Games in Saint Petersburg, Russia, from 23 July to 7 August 1994 firstly after the disintegration of the Soviet Union. Ukraine with Belarus was among the top-8 in the medal table.

Oleg Salenko, a Russian-Ukrainian footballer, represented World All-Stars in the soccer match against Russia, who defeated his team 2–1 to win the football competition.

== Medalists ==
Medal	Name	Sport	Event
Gold	Iryna Romanova; Igor Yaroshenko	Figure skating	Ice dancing
Gold	Hrihoriy Misyutin; Lilia Podkopayeva	Artistic gymnastics	Mixed team (with Belarus)
Gold	Hrihoriy Misyutin	Artistic gymnastics	Pommel horse
Gold	Hrihoriy Misyutin	Artistic gymnastics	Vault
Gold	Hrihoriy Misyutin	Artistic gymnastics	Floor exercise
Gold	Lilia Podkopayeva	Artistic gymnastics	Vault
Gold	Kateryna Serebrianska	Rhythmic gymnastics	Clubs
Gold	Kateryna Serebrianska	Rhythmic gymnastics	Ribbon
Silver	Kateryna Serebrianska	Rhythmic gymnastics	Individual all-around
Silver	Serhiy Nagirny	Weightlifting	+108 kg
Silver	Viktor Yefteni	Wrestling	48 kg
Bronze	Sergey Bubka	Athletics	Pole vault
Bronze	Anzhela Kravchenko; Antonina Slyusar; Viktoriya Fomenko; Irina Slyusar	Athletics	4 × 100 metres relay
Bronze	Lilia Podkopayeva	Artistic gymnastics	Floor exercise
Bronze	Lilia Podkopayeva; Oksana Knizhnik; Irina Bulakhova; Tetyana Malaya	Artistic gymnastics	Team all-around
Bronze	Kateryna Serebrianska	Rhythmic gymnastics	Hoop
Bronze	Kateryna Serebrianska	Rhythmic gymnastics	Ball
Bronze	Andriy Petrov; Andriy Borzukov	Canoeing	K-2 500 m
Bronze	Andriy Petrov; Andriy Borzukov	Canoeing	K-2 1000 m
Bronze	Viktor Dobrotvorskiy; Andriy Balabanov	Canoeing	C-2 1000 m
Bronze	Roman Motrovych	Wrestling	62 kg
Bronze	Tetiana Beliaieva	Judo	72 kg
