= 1993 U.S. Olympic Festival =

The 1993 U.S. Olympic Festival was held from July 23 to August 1, 1993 in San Antonio, Texas. It was the twelfth edition of the junior multi-sport event held in the United States by the United States Olympic Committee.

== Statistics ==
Statistics for event:

- 3,500 athletes attending
- 125 Olympians attending
- Total sports: 37
- 1,517 credentials issued
- 30 hours of TV coverage on TNT and prime network stations
- 19,000 volunteers

The festival opened on July 23, 1993 with the opening ceremonies at the Alamodome to a crowd of 62,702 and would continue for ten days.

== Event locations ==
| Event | Location |
|---|---|
| Opening ceremonies | Alamodome |
| Archery | Our Lady of the Lake University |
| Badminton | Incarnate Word University |
| Baseball | V.J. Keefe Field |
| Basketball | Hemisfair Arena |
| Bowling | University Bowl |
| Boxing | Freeman Coliseum |
| Canoe/Kayak - sprint | Canyon Lake |
| Canoe/Kayak - whitewater | Guadalupe river |
| Cycling - time trials | City of Devine (Suburb of San Antonio, to the Southwest) |
| Cycling - criterium | Ft. Sam Houston |
| Cycling - road races | Olmos Basin |
| Diving | Palo Alto Natatorium |
| Equestrian | Freeman Coliseum |
| Fencing | Incarnate Word University |
| Field hockey | Alamo Stadium |
| Figure skating | Alamodome |
| Gymnastics - Artistic | HemisFair Arena |
| Gymnastics - Rhythmic | Blossom gym |
| Ice Hockey | Alamodome |
| Judo | Our Lady of the Lake University |
| Modern Pentathlon | Palo Alto College |
| Racquetball | Racquetball and Fitness Club of San Antonio |
| Roller skating | San Antonio Convention Center |
| Rowing | Canyon Lake |
| Sailing | Canyon Lake |
| Shooting | Lackland Air Force Base |
| Soccer | Blossom Athletic Complex |
| Softball - Men's | Alva Jo Fisher Complex |
| Softball - Women's | Alva Jo Fisher Complex |
| Speed skating | Alamodome |
| Swimming | Palo Alto Natatorium |
| Synchronized Swimming | Palo Alto Natatorium |
| Table Tennis | Palo Alto College |
| Taekwando | Paul Taylor Fieldhouse |
| Team Handball | San Antonio Convention Center |
| Tennis | McFarlin Tennis Center |
| Volleyball | UTSA Convocation Center |
| Water polo | Palo Alto Natatorium |
| Weightlifting | Lila Cockrell Theater |
| Wrestling | Paul Taylor Fieldhouse |
| Closing ceremonies | Alamodome |

== Notable athletes ==
| Athletes | Sport |
|---|---|
| Michelle Kwan | Figure Skating |
| Shannon Miller | Gymnastics |
| Alex Rodriguez "A-Rod" | Baseball |
| Tim Thomas | Ice Hockey |
| Rasheed Wallace | Basketball |

== Athlete housing locations ==
Location
Lackland Air Force Base
Incarnate Word College
Our Lady of the Lake University
St. Mary's University
