= Ukraine at the 2001 Goodwill Games =

- IOC code: UKR

in Brisbane 29 August - 9 September 2001
- Competitors: 30 in 9 sports
- Medals Ranked 8th: Gold 4 Silver 9 Bronze 8 Total 21

Summer appearances
- 1994; 1998; 2001

Ukraine competed at the 2001 Goodwill Games in Brisbane, Queensland, Australia, from 29 August to 9 September 2001. Ukraine won 4 gold, 9 silver and 8 bronze medals, being among the top-8 in the medal table. 30 Ukrainian athletes took part in 9 sports.

At the 2001 Goodwill Games in Brisbane, Australia, Alina Kabaeva won the gold medal for the ball, clubs, and rope competitions, and the silver one in the individual all-Around, and hoop. However, Kabaeva and her teammate, Irina Tchachina, tested positive to a banned diuretic (furosemide), and were stripped of their medals, so Anna Bessonova won a gold medal in clubs competition and four silver medals in the individual all-around, hope, rope and ball competitions.

== Medalists ==
Medal	Name	Sport	Event
Gold	Tetyana Tereshchuk	Athletics	400 metres hurdles
Gold	Anna Bessonova	Rhythmic gymnastics	Clubs
Gold	Yana Klochkova	Swimming	800 metres freestyle
Gold	Yana Klochkova	Swimming	400 metres medley
Silver	Zhanna Pintusevich-Block	Athletics	100 metres
Silver	Serhiy Danylchenko	Boxing	Bantamweight
Silver	Anna Bessonova	Rhythmic gymnastics	Individual all-around
Silver	Anna Bessonova	Rhythmic gymnastics	Rope
Silver	Anna Bessonova	Rhythmic gymnastics	Hoop
Silver	Anna Bessonova	Rhythmic gymnastics	Ball
Silver	Olexander Chernonos	Trampoline gymnastics	Men's individual
Silver	Yana Klochkova	Swimming	400 metres freestyle
Silver	Yana Klochkova	Swimming	200 metres medley
Bronze	Vita Palamar	Athletics	High jump
Bronze	Olena Hovorova	Athletics	Triple jump
Bronze	Gennadiy Ozarinski	Boxing	Flyweight
Bronze	Volodymyr Kolesnyk	Boxing	Lightweight
Bronze	Yuriy Solotov	Boxing	Light welterweight
Bronze	Alona Kvasha	Artistic gymnastics	Vault
Bronze	Oxana Tsyhuleva	Trampoline gymnastics	Women's individual
Bronze	Olena Zhupina; Hanna Sorokina	Diving	3 metres synchro
