= Chris Young (gymnast) =

American artistic gymnast

- Full name: Chris Young
- Born: February 1, 1973 (age 53) Winston-Salem, North Carolina, U.S.

Gymnastics career
- Discipline: Men's artistic gymnastics
- Country represented: United States (1998–2000)
- Gym: USOTC; Team Texaco; Salem Gymnastics
- Head coach: Vitaly Marinich
- Former coaches: Ron Brant, Bob Kohut
Medal record
Men's artistic gymnastics
Representing United States
Event	1st	2nd	3rd
Pan American Games	0	1	0
Total	0	1	0
Pan American Games
Silver medal – second place	1999 Winnipeg	Team

Chris Young (born February 1, 1973) is a retired American artistic gymnast. He was a member of the United States men's national artistic gymnastics team and won a silver medal at the 1999 Pan American Games.

== Early life and education ==
Young was born on February 1, 1973, in Winston-Salem, North Carolina. Most commonly known as Chris Young, he also competed as James Young. Young was involved with the Big Brothers Big Sisters of America and was introduced to gymnastics at 9 years old. He played numerous other sports growing up including football and basketball. He trained with Salem Gymnastics under Bob Kohut and was a top-ranked youth gymnast. He attended West Forsyth High School and suffered an anterior cruciate ligament injury during his junior year that led to an exclusive focus on gymnastics afterward. After graduating in 1992, he earned a scholarship to and enrolled at the University of Minnesota to pursue gymnastics.

== Gymnastics career ==
On the international stage, Young was a member of the United States men's national artistic gymnastics team. He was first named to the team in 1998. He trained at the United States Olympic Training Center in Colorado Springs, Colorado for years. He represented the United States at the 1999 Pan American Games and won a silver medal in the team all-around. Later that year, he was selected to represent the United States at the 1999 World Artistic Gymnastics Championships in Tianjin.

Six months before the 2000 United States Olympic trials, Young suffered an Achilles tendon rupture. He received an exemption to compete in the event but was not selected for the 2000 Summer Olympics team and retired afterward.

== Personal life ==
Upon retiring from gymnastic competition, Young and his former coach, Bob Kohut, opened and were co-owners of Kernersville, North Carolina-based Flip Force Gymnastics. Young coaches gymnastics at his boyhood club, Salem Gymnastics, where his son is a gymnast.
