= Mok Un-ju =

North Korean gymnast

Personal information
- Nationality: North Korean
- Born: 29 March 1981 (age 44)

Sport
- Sport: Gymnastics

Mok Un-ju (born 29 March 1981) is a North Korean former gymnast. She competed at the 2000 Summer Olympics.
