= Meng Fei (gymnast) =

Chinese artistic gymnast

- Born: March 22, 1981 (age 45)
- Height: 150 cm (4 ft 11 in)

Gymnastics career
- Discipline: Women's artistic gymnastics
- Country represented: China
- Club: Beijing Gymnastics Team
- Head coach: Shenzen Lu
- Assistant coach: Qunlin Liu
- Retired: 1999
Medal record
Representing China
World Championships
Silver medal – second place	1995 Sabae	Team
Silver medal – second place	1997 Lausanne	Uneven Bars
Bronze medal – third place	1997 Lausanne	Team
Asian Games
Gold medal – first place	1998 Bangkok	Team
Silver medal – second place	1998 Bangkok	Balance Beam
East Asian Games
Gold medal – first place	1997 Busan	Team
Silver medal – second place	1997 Busan	All-Around
Silver medal – second place	1997 Busan	Uneven Bars
National Games
Gold medal – first place	1997 Shanghai	All-Around
Silver medal – second place	1997 Shanghai	Team
Silver medal – second place	1997 Shanghai	Floor Exercise
Bronze medal – third place	1997 Shanghai	Uneven Bars
Bronze medal – third place	1997 Shanghai	Balance Beam

Meng Fei (born March 22, 1981) is a Chinese artistic gymnast. She won the silver medal in the uneven bars and the bronze medal in the team event at the 1997 World Artistic Gymnastics Championships. She was also a part of the silver-medal-winning team at the 1995 World Artistic Gymnastics Championships.

Currently Meng Fei is an optional team coach at Woodlands Gymnastics Academy in Spring, Texas USA.

== Competition history ==
Year	Event	TF	AA	VT	UB	BB	FX
Junior
1994	Catania Cup		5				
Senior
1995	USA-BLR-CHN Tri-Meet		2nd place, silver medalist(s)				
1995	World Championships	2nd place, silver medalist(s)	27	8			
1996	China Cup		1st place, gold medalist(s)				
1996	Pacific Alliance Championships		10				
1997	East Asian Games	1st place, gold medalist(s)	5				1st place, gold medalist(s)
1997	International Team Championships	3rd place, bronze medalist(s)	5				
1997	SUI-CHN-BLR Tri-Meet		2nd place, silver medalist(s)				
1997	Trophee Massilia			5	1st place, gold medalist(s)		
1997	World Championships	3rd place, bronze medalist(s)	5		2nd place, silver medalist(s)		4
1998	Visa American Cup		2nd place, silver medalist(s)				
1998	Asian Games	1st place, gold medalist(s)				2nd place, silver medalist(s)	
1998	Goodwill Games		4		8		4
1998	3-on-3 International	6					
