= Goodwill Games =

International sports competition (1986–2001)

- Logo of the second Games in Seattle
- Purpose: Response to the political issues concerning the Olympic Games of the 1980s
- Frequency: Every 4 years
- Inaugurated: Moscow, USSR, in 1986
- Most recent: Brisbane, Australia, in 2001
- Headquarters: Atlanta, Georgia, United States

The Goodwill Games were an international sports competition created by Ted Turner in reaction to the political troubles surrounding the Olympic Games of the 1980s. In 1979, the Soviet invasion of Afghanistan caused the United States and other Western countries to boycott the 1980 Summer Olympics in Moscow, an act reciprocated when the Soviet Union and other Eastern Bloc countries (with the exception of Romania) boycotted the 1984 Summer Olympics in Los Angeles.

The idea came to Turner in 1984 during his visit to Moscow. He was disappointed with the boycott, evaluating it as a negative outcome for both sides in the conflict. The magnate also believed that it was an opportune moment to create alternative high-level competitions that could "steal" some of the success from the Olympics. The organization of the competition, which started in 1986, cost him more than $11 million.

Like the Olympics, the Goodwill Games were held every four years (with the exception of the final Games), and had a summer and winter component. However, unlike the Olympics, figure skating, ice hockey and short track speed skating were part of summer editions. The Summer Goodwill Games occurred five times, between 1986 and 2001, while the Winter Goodwill Games occurred only once, in 2000. They were cancelled by Time Warner, which had bought ownership of them in 1996, because of low television ratings after the 2001 Games in Brisbane.

== Overview ==
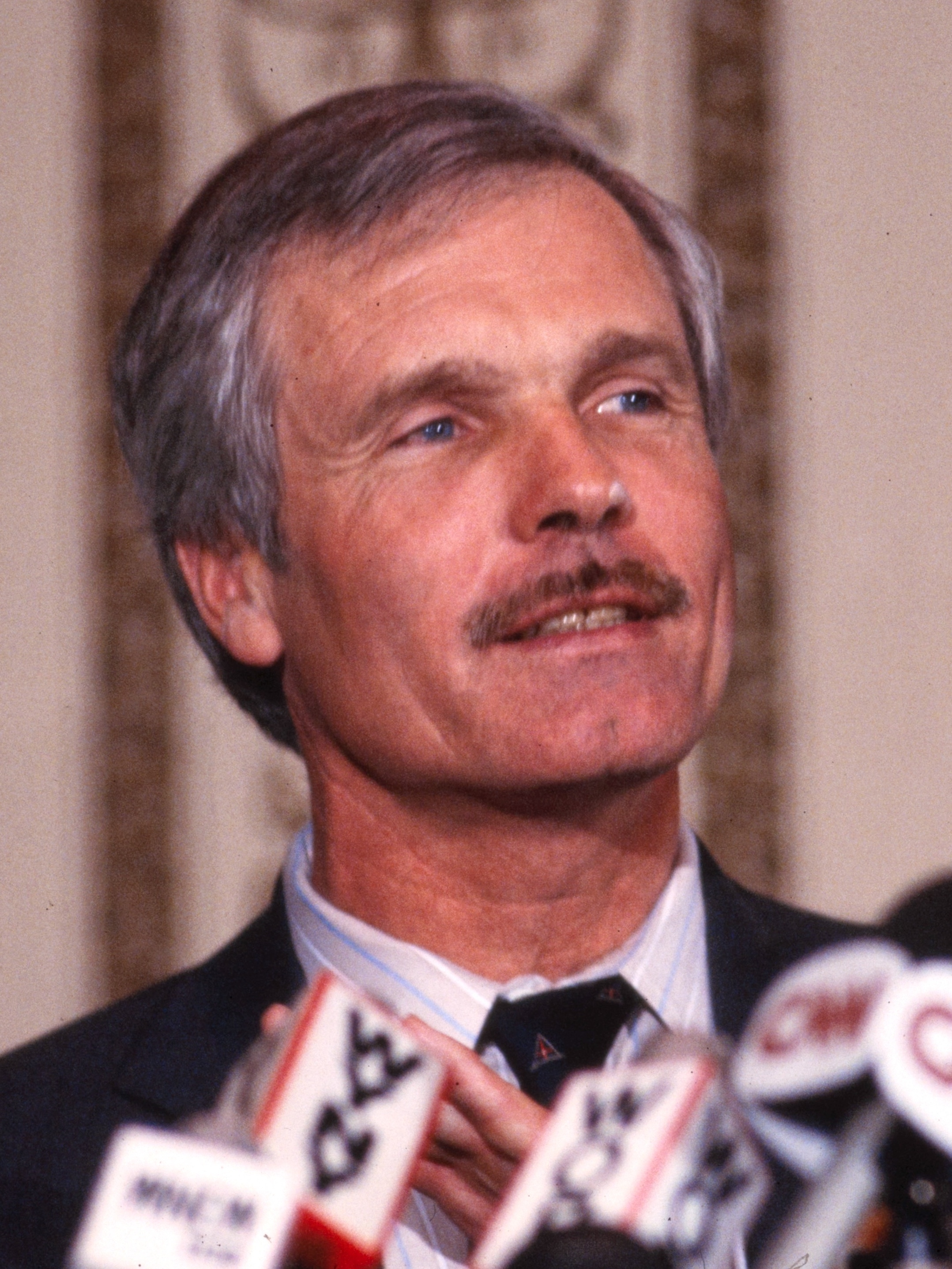
Ted Turner of Turner Broadcasting created and funded the inaugural Goodwill Games

Founded in 1985 by then-Turner Broadcasting System chairman Ted Turner, The Goodwill Games were created to foster athletic competition between the United States and the Soviet Union during the Cold War. The first Goodwill Games, held in Moscow in 1986, featured 182 events and attracted over 3,000 athletes representing 79 countries. World records were set by Sergey Bubka (pole vault), Jackie Joyner-Kersee (heptathlon), and both the men and women's 200 m cycle racing, by East Germany's Michael Hübner and the Soviet Union's Erika Salumäe, respectively. World records also fell at the 1990 Games in Seattle, to Mike Barrowman in the 200 m breaststroke and Nadezhda Ryashkina in the 10 km walk.

The 1994 Games in Saint Petersburg, Russia were the first competition held since the dissolution of the Soviet Union. Russians set five world records in the weightlifting section, and the games were the first major international event to feature beach volleyball, which would appear at the Olympics for the first time at the 1996 Summer Olympics.

In October 1996, Turner's company, the Turner Broadcasting System, merged with Time Warner, thus bringing the Goodwill Games under the control of the latter. Ted Turner's last Games were in 1998 in New York City, with memorable highlights including Joyner-Kersee winning her fourth straight heptathlon title, the U.S. 4 × 400 m relay team setting a world's best time, plus Michelle Kwan and Todd Eldredge winning the gold in figure skating, and Dominique Moceanu capturing the women's gymnastics gold medal. Time Warner organized the 2001 Games in Brisbane, Australia, before announcing that this would be the last edition of the games. With the cancellation of the Games, Phoenix and Calgary lost their respective Summer and Winter Games, scheduled for 2005. The 2001 edition witnessed Australia winning the most medals with 75, but it received very low television ratings in the United States. Nevertheless, critics praised Turner Network Television for showing the games live, rather than on tape delay.

During a live interview at the 2009 Denver SportAccord conference, Turner blamed the demise of the Games on the short-sighted management of Time Warner, and stated, "If I'd have stayed there the Goodwill Games would not have been canceled." Turner expressed hope that the games would return as a bridge to restore cultural contact between Russia and the U.S., stating that the relationship between the two had steadily disintegrated since the Cold War, which he called a dangerous situation because of both countries' massive nuclear arsenals. He also reiterated his belief in the power of international sporting competitions to prevent war, saying that "as long as the Olympics are taking place and not being boycotted, it's virtually impossible to have a world war", because the nations involved "wouldn't want a war to mess up their chances".

== Summer Goodwill Games ==
Host cities of the Goodwill Games

Edition	Year	Host city	County/Province/Region/State/Territory	Country	Notes
I	1986	Moscow		Soviet Union	3,000 athletes and 79 countries
II	1990	Seattle	Washington	United States	2,300 athletes and 54 countries
III	1994	Saint Petersburg		Russia	2,000 athletes and 59 countries
IV	1998	New York City	New York	United States	1,300 athletes and 60 countries
V	2001	Brisbane	Queensland	Australia	1,300 athletes and 58 countries
VI	2005	Phoenix	Arizona	United States	Games cancelled

== Winter Goodwill Games ==
Edition	Year	Host city	Country	Notes
I	2000	Lake Placid, New York	United States	Only Winter Goodwill Games ever held
II	2005	Calgary, Alberta	Canada	Games cancelled

== Sports ==
=== Summer sports ===
Sport	86	90	94	98	01
Archery			•		
Artistic gymnastics	•	•	•	•	•
Athletics (details)	•	•	•	•	•
Baseball		•			
Basketball	•	•	•	•	•
Beach volleyball			•	•	•
Boxing	•	•	•	•	•
Canoeing			•		
Cycling	•	•	•	•	•
Diving	•	•	•	•	•
Figure skating (details)		•	•	•	•
Football (details)			•	•	
Handball (details)	•	•	•		
Ice hockey		•			
Judo (details)	•	•	•		
Modern pentathlon	•	•			

Sport	86	90	94	98	01
Motoball	•				
Rhythmic gymnastics	•	•	•	•	•
Rowing	•	•	•		
Short track speed skating			•		
Surf lifesaving					•
Swimming (details)	•	•	•	•	•
Synchronized swimming		•	•	•	
Taekwondo			•		
Tennis	•				
Trampolining					•
Triathlon			•	•	•
Volleyball	•	•	•		
Water polo	•	•	•	•	
Weightlifting	•	•	•		•
Wrestling	•	•	•	•	
Yachting	•		•		

=== Winter sports ===
- Alpine skiing
- Bobsleigh
- Cross-country skiing
- Figure skating
- Freestyle skiing
- Luge
- Nordic combined
- Skeleton
- Ski jumping
- Snowboarding
- Speed skating

== Participating countries ==
Africa and Middle East

- Algeria
- Benin
- Burkina Faso
- Côte d'Ivoire
- Ethiopia
- Kenya
- Morocco
- Namibia
- Nigeria
- Senegal
- Seychelles
- Syria
- Tanzania
- Tunisia
- North Yemen – later as Yemen
- Zimbabwe

Asia and Oceania

- Australia
- Bangladesh
- Cambodia
- China
- Japan
- North Korea
- South Korea
- Laos
- New Zealand
- Philippines
- American Samoa
- Taiwan (as Chinese Taipei)
- Vietnam

Europe

- Finland
- France
- Great Britain
- Greece
- Ireland
- Italy
- Portugal
- Spain
- Sweden
- West Germany – later as Germany
- Yugoslavia

Eastern Bloc

- Belarus
- Bulgaria
- Czechoslovakia – later as the Czech Republic
- Czechoslovakia – later as Slovakia
- East Germany – later as Reunified Germany
- Estonia
- Hungary
- Kazakhstan
- Latvia
- Lithuania
- Poland
- Romania
- Soviet Union – later as Russia
- Ukraine
- Uzbekistan

North America

- Canada
- Mexico
- United States

Caribbean and Central America

- Bahamas
- Costa Rica
- Cuba
- Jamaica
- Puerto Rico
- Trinidad and Tobago

South America

- Argentina
- Brazil
- Colombia
- Ecuador
- Peru
- Uruguay

== See also ==
- Enhanced Games - an analogous event to contest the Olympic Games amid ongoing controversies
- Liberty Bell Classic
- Friendship Games
