= Sergey Fedorchenko =

Kazakhstani gymnast (born 1974)

Sergei Fedorchenko
- Born: 18 September 1974 (age 51) Alma-Ata, Kazakh SSR, Soviet Union

Gymnastics career
- Discipline: Men's artistic gymnastics
- Country represented: Kazakhstan
- Eponymous skills: 'Fedorchenko' (horizontal bar dismount)
Medal record
Representing Kazakhstan
World Championships
Gold medal – first place	1997 Lausanne	Vault
East Asian Games
Gold medal – first place	1997 Busan	Floor exercise
Gold medal – first place	1997 Busan	Vault
Asian Games
Silver medal – second place	1994 Hiroshima	Floor Exercise
Bronze medal – third place	1994 Hiroshima	Horizontal Bar

Sergei Vladimirovich Fedorchenko (Russian: Сергей Владимирович Федорченко; born 18 September 1974) is a Kazakhstani former gymnast who competed in the 1996 Summer Olympics and in the 2000 Summer Olympics.

The "Fedorchenko" is a dismount from high bar with two laid out backflips and three twists. It remains rare because of its difficulty. He also has a move named after him on pommel horse that is also used on floor exercise.
