= Shen Jian =

Chinese gymnast

- Born: 14 May 1975 (age 51) Minggong Village, Qingyun, Xintai, Shandong, China

Gymnastics career
- Discipline: Men's artistic gymnastics
- Country represented: China
Medal record
Olympics
Silver medal – second place	1996 Atlanta	Team
World Championships
Gold medal – first place	1995 Sabae	Team
Gold medal – first place	1997 Lausanne	Team

Shen Jian (simplified Chinese: 沈剑; traditional Chinese: 沈劍; pinyin: Shěn Jiàn; born 14 May 1975) is a Chinese gymnast. He competed at the 1996 Summer Olympics in Atlanta, winning a silver medal in men's team competition.
