= Gymnastics at the 1996 Summer Olympics – Women's artistic individual all-around =

Women's artistic individual all-around at the Games of the XXVI Olympiad
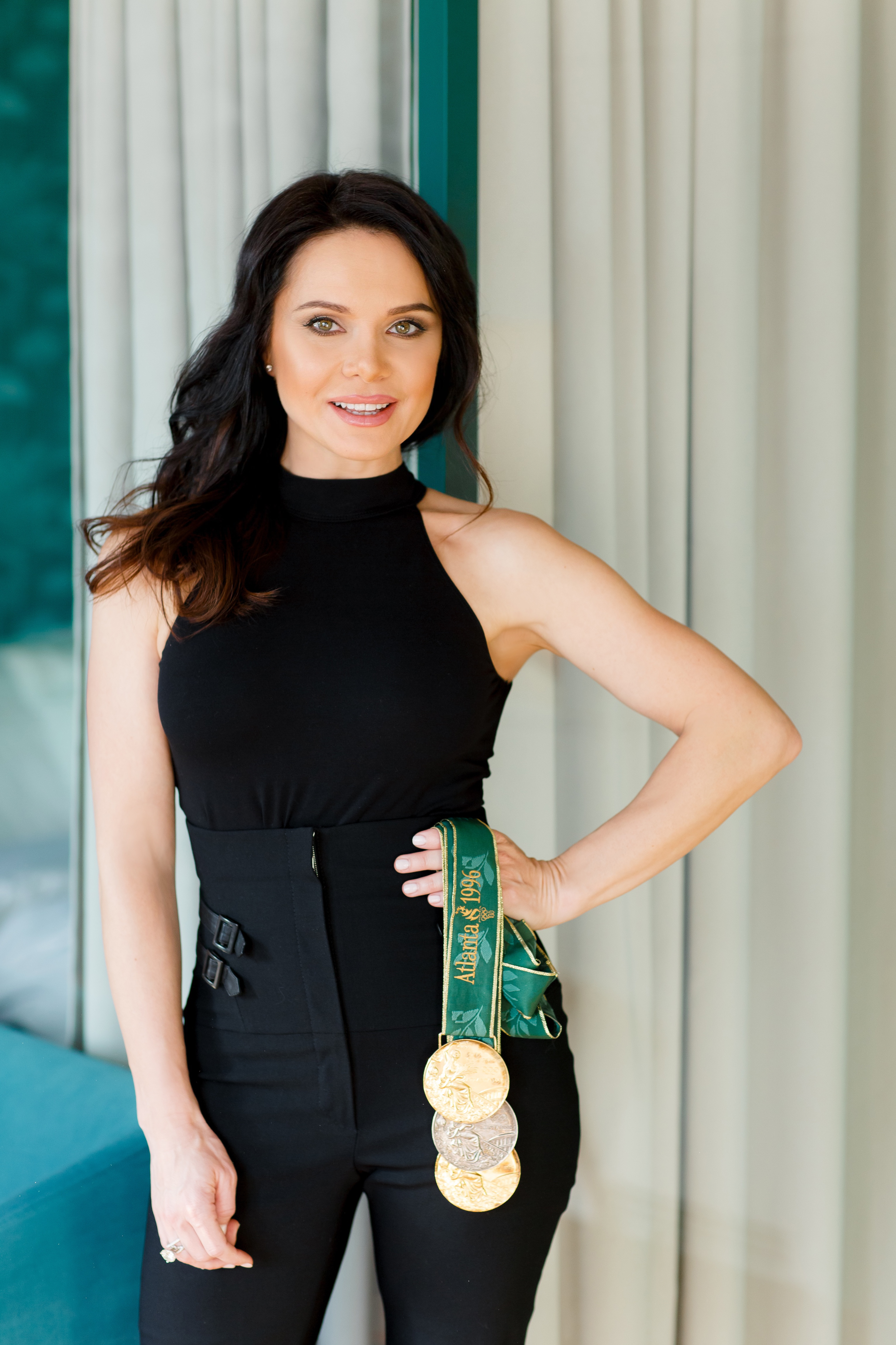
- Gold medalist Liliya Podkopayeva (2021)
- Venue: Georgia Dome
- Date: July 25, 1996
- Competitors: 105 from 36 nations

Medalists
1st place, gold medalist(s)		Lilia Podkopayeva	Ukraine
2nd place, silver medalist(s)		Gina Gogean	Romania
3rd place, bronze medalist(s)		Simona Amânar	Romania
3rd place, bronze medalist(s)		Lavinia Miloșovici	Romania

These are the results of the women's individual all-around competition, one of six events for female competitors in artistic gymnastics at the 1996 Summer Olympics in Atlanta. The qualification and final rounds took place on July 21, 23 and 25th at the Georgia Dome.

== Results ==
=== Qualification ===
Seventy-four gymnasts competed in the all-around during the compulsory and optional rounds on July 21 and 23. The thirty-six highest scoring gymnasts advanced to the final on July 25. Each country was limited to three competitors in the final.

=== Final ===
Rank	Gymnast	Vault	Uneven Bars	Balance Beam	Floor Exercise	Total
Gold medal	Lilia Podkopayeva (UKR)	9.781 (3)	9.800 (=2)	9.787 (=7)	9.887 (1)	39.255
Silver medal	Gina Gogean (ROU)	9.775 (4)	9.700 (=11)	9.800 (=5)	9.800 (3)	39.075
Bronze medal	Simona Amânar (ROU)	9.843 (1)	9.762 (=5)	9.725 (=10)	9.737 (7)	39.067
Bronze medal	Lavinia Miloșovici (ROU)	9.743 (5)	9.737 (9)	9.775 (9)	9.812 (2)	39.067
5	Mo Huilan (CHN)	9.799 (2)	9.800 (=2)	9.800 (=5)	9.650 (=13)	39.049
6	Dina Kochetkova (RUS)	9.581 (20)	9.787 (4)	9.825 (=2)	9.787 (4)	38.980
7	Rozalia Galiyeva (RUS)	9.681 (=13)	9.762 (=5)	9.825 (=2)	9.637 (15)	38.905
8	Shannon Miller (USA)	9.724 (6)	9.750 (8)	9.862 (1)	9.475 (29)	38.811
9	Dominique Moceanu (USA)	9.706 (=8)	9.762 (=5)	9.600 (17)	9.687 (10)	38.755
10	Oksana Chusovitina (UZB)	9.631 (15)	9.687 (=13)	9.675 (=14)	9.750 (=5)	38.743
11	Qiao Ya (CHN)	9.718 (7)	9.600 (20)	9.725 (=10)	9.675 (11)	38.718
12	Yelena Piskun (BLR)	9.687 (=11)	9.712 (10)	9.675 (=14)	9.575 (=21)	38.649
13	Isabelle Severino (FRA)	9.562 (23)	9.675 (=15)	9.587 (=18)	9.700 (=8)	38.524
14	Svetlana Boginskaya (BLR)	9.687 (=11)	9.675 (=15)	9.537 (21)	9.600 (=16)	38.499
15	Svetlana Khorkina (RUS)	9.706 (=8)	9.262 (30)	9.787 (=7)	9.700 (=8)	38.455
16	Elvire Teza (FRA)	9.493 (=28)	9.687 (=13)	9.687 (=12)	9.587 (18)	38.454
17	Dominique Dawes (USA)	9.681 (=13)	9.812 (1)	9.825 (=2)	9.000 (33)	38.318
17	Mónica Martín (ESP)	9.556 (24)	9.475 (=24)	9.625 (16)	9.662 (12)	38.318
19	Ludivine Furnon (FRA)	9.606 (=17)	9.425 (27)	9.462 (22)	9.750 (=5)	38.243
20	Mao Yanling (CHN)	9.693 (10)	9.700 (=11)	9.200 (28)	9.650 (=13)	38.243
21	Vasiliki Tsavdaridou (GRE)	9.518 (25)	9.562 (22)	9.687 (=12)	9.450 (30)	38.217
22	Lioubov Sheremeta (UKR)	9.468 (30)	9.637 (18)	9.587 (=18)	9.512 (=26)	38.204
23	Svitlana Zelepukina (UKR)	9.512 (=26)	9.650 (17)	9.325 (25)	9.537 (25)	38.024
24	Joana Juárez (ESP)	9.568 (22)	9.575 (21)	9.300 (27)	9.512 (=26)	37.955
25	Alena Polozkova (BLR)	9.587 (19)	9.162 (32)	9.450 (23)	9.600 (=16)	37.799
26	Yvonne Tousek (CAN)	9.493 (=28)	9.100 (33)	9.575 (20)	9.625 (16)	37.793
27	Mercedes Pacheco (ESP)	9.462 (31)	9.625 (19)	9.137 (30)	9.562 (=23)	37.786
28	Adrienn Varga (HUN)	9.606 (=17)	9.187 (31)	9.312 (26)	9.487 (28)	37.592
29	Risa Sugawara (JPN)	9.412 (34)	9.475 (=24)	8.950 (32)	9.562 (=23)	37.399
30	Adrienn Nyeste (HUN)	9.575 (21)	9.462 (26)	8.925 (34)	9.275 (32)	37.237
31	Anastasia Dzyundzyak (UZB)	9.512 (=26)	9.275 (29)	9.125 (31)	9.312 (31)	37.224
32	Nikolett Krausz (HUN)	9.612 (16)	8.837 (35)	8.912 (35)	9.575 (=21)	36.936
33	Giordana Rocchi (ITA)	9.418 (33)	9.075 (34)	9.337 (24)	8.987 (34)	36.817
34	Joanna Hughes (AUS)	9.456 (32)	8.350 (36)	9.162 (29)	9.600 (=17)	36.568
35	Ruth Moniz (AUS)	9.256 (36)	9.525 (23)	8.937 (33)	8.700 (36)	36.418
36	Lisa Skinner (AUS)	9.375 (35)	9.412 (28)	8.475 (36)	8.937 (35)	36.199
