= European Artistic Gymnastics Championships – Women's floor =

The floor event at the European Women's Artistic Gymnastics Championships was first held in 1957.

Three medals are awarded: gold for first place, silver for second place, and bronze for third place. Tie breakers have not been used in every year. In the event of a tie between two gymnasts, both names are listed, and the following position (second for a tie for first, third for a tie for second) is left empty because a medal was not awarded for that position. If three gymnastics tied for a position, the following two positions are left empty.

Sandra Izbașa, Larisa Iordache, and Jessica Gadirova share the record for most gold medals in this event, with three. The current champion is Ana Bărbosu.

== Medalists ==
Year	Location	Gold	Silver	Bronze
1957	(Romania) Bucharest	(Soviet Union) Larisa Latynina	(Romania) Elena Leușteanu	(Czechoslovakia) Eva Bosáková
1959	(Poland) Kraków	(Soviet Union) Polina Astakhova	(Soviet Union) Tamara Manina	(Czechoslovakia) Eva Bosáková
1961	(East Germany) Leipzig	(Soviet Union) Larisa Latynina	(Soviet Union) Polina Astakhova	(Czechoslovakia) Věra Čáslavská
1963	(France) Paris	(Socialist Federal Republic of Yugoslavia) Mirjana Bilić	(Sweden) Solveig Egman-Andersson	(Socialist Federal Republic of Yugoslavia) Tereza Kočiš
1965	(Bulgaria) Sofia	(Czechoslovakia) Věra Čáslavská	(Soviet Union) Larisa Latynina (East Germany) Birgit Radochla	None awarded
1967	(Netherlands) Amsterdam	(Czechoslovakia) Věra Čáslavská	(Soviet Union) Natalia Kuchinskaya	(Soviet Union) Zinaida Voronina
1969	(Sweden) Landskrona	(Soviet Union) Olga Karasyova	(East Germany) Karin Büttner-Janz	(Soviet Union) Ludmilla Tourischeva (Czechoslovakia) Jindra Košťálová
1971	(Soviet Union) Minsk	(Soviet Union) Ludmilla Tourischeva	(Soviet Union) Tamara Lazakovich	(East Germany) Erika Zuchold
1973	(United Kingdom) London	(Soviet Union) Ludmilla Tourischeva	(East Germany) Angelika Hellmann	(Romania) Alina Goreac
1975	(Norway) Skien	(Soviet Union) Nellie Kim	(Romania) Nadia Comăneci	(Soviet Union) Ludmilla Tourischeva
1977	(Czechoslovakia) Prague	(Soviet Union) Elena Mukhina (Soviet Union) Maria Filatova	None awarded	(Soviet Union) Nellie Kim
1979	(Denmark) Copenhagen	(Romania) Nadia Comăneci	(Soviet Union) Natalia Shaposhnikova (Soviet Union) Elena Mukhina	None awarded
1981	(Spain) Madrid	(East Germany) Maxi Gnauck	(Soviet Union) Alla Misnik	(Romania) Cristina Elena Grigoraș
1983	(Sweden) Gothenburg	(Romania) Ecaterina Szabo (Soviet Union) Olga Bicherova	None awarded	(Bulgaria) Boriana Stoyanova
1985	(Finland) Helsinki	(Soviet Union) Yelena Shushunova	(Soviet Union) Oksana Omelianchik	(Romania) Daniela Silivaș
1987	(Soviet Union) Moscow	(Romania) Daniela Silivaș	(Romania) Camelia Voinea	(Soviet Union) Aleftina Pryakhina
1989	(Belgium) Brussels	(Romania) Daniela Silivaș (Soviet Union) Svetlana Boginskaya	None awarded	(Romania) Cristina Bontaș (Hungary) Henrietta Ónodi
1990	(Greece) Athens	(Soviet Union) Svetlana Boginskaya	(Soviet Union) Tatiana Groshkova	(Hungary) Henrietta Ónodi (Bulgaria) Milena Mavrodieva
1992	(France) Nantes	(Romania) Gina Gogean	(France) Melanie Legros	(Ukraine) Tatiana Gutsu
1994	(Sweden) Stockholm	(Ukraine) Lilia Podkopayeva	(Romania) Lavinia Miloșovici	(Russia) Dina Kochetkova (Romania) Gina Gogean
1996	(United Kingdom) Birmingham	(Ukraine) Lilia Podkopayeva (Romania) Lavinia Miloșovici	None awarded	(Russia) Dina Kochetkova (Spain) Joana Juárez
1998	(Russia) Saint Petersburg	(Romania) Corina Ungureanu (Russia) Svetlana Khorkina	None awarded	(Romania) Simona Amânar
2000	(France) Paris	(France) Ludivine Furnon	(Ukraine) Viktoria Karpenko (Romania) Andreea Răducan (Russia) Yelena Produnova	None awarded
2002	(Greece) Patras	(Ukraine) Alona Kvasha	(Russia) Natalia Ziganshina	(Netherlands) Verona van de Leur
2004	(Netherlands) Amsterdam	(Romania) Cătălina Ponor	(Spain) Elena Gómez	(Italy) Maria Teresa Gargano
2005	(Hungary) Debrecen	(France) Isabelle Severino	(Netherlands) Suzanne Harmes	(France) Émilie Le Pennec
2006	(Greece) Volos	(Romania) Sandra Izbașa	(Italy) Vanessa Ferrari	(Romania) Cătălina Ponor
2007	(Netherlands) Amsterdam	(Italy) Vanessa Ferrari	(United Kingdom) Beth Tweddle	(Ukraine) Alina Kozich
2008	(France) Clermont-Ferrand	(Romania) Sandra Izbașa	(United Kingdom) Beth Tweddle	(Romania) Anamaria Tămârjan
2009	(Italy) Milan	(United Kingdom) Beth Tweddle	(Italy) Vanessa Ferrari	(Russia) Ksenia Semyonova
2010	(United Kingdom) Birmingham	(United Kingdom) Beth Tweddle	(Russia) Anna Myzdrikova	(Romania) Diana Chelaru
2011	(Germany) Berlin	(Romania) Sandra Izbașa	(Romania) Diana Chelaru	(Russia) Yulia Belokobylskaya
2012	(Belgium) Brussels	(Romania) Larisa Iordache	(Romania) Cătălina Ponor	(United Kingdom) Hannah Whelan
2013	(Russia) Moscow	(Russia) Ksenia Afanasyeva	(Romania) Larisa Iordache	(Romania) Diana Bulimar
2014	(Bulgaria) Sofia	(Italy) Vanessa Ferrari (Romania) Larisa Iordache	None awarded	(Switzerland) Giulia Steingruber
2015	(France) Montpellier	(Russia) Ksenia Afanasyeva	(United Kingdom) Claudia Fragapane	(Switzerland) Giulia Steingruber
2016	(Switzerland) Bern	(Switzerland) Giulia Steingruber	(United Kingdom) Ellie Downie	(Romania) Cătălina Ponor
2017	(Romania) Cluj-Napoca	(Russia) Angelina Melnikova	(United Kingdom) Ellie Downie	(Netherlands) Eythora Thorsdottir
2018	(Scotland) Glasgow	(France) Mélanie de Jesus dos Santos	(Romania) Denisa Golgotă	(Belgium) Axelle Klinckaert
2019	(Poland) Szczecin	(France) Mélanie de Jesus dos Santos	(Netherlands) Eythora Thorsdottir	(Russia) Angelina Melnikova
2020	(Turkey) Mersin	(Romania) Larisa Iordache	(Turkey) Göksu Üçtaş Şanlı	(Israel) Lihie Raz
2021	(Switzerland) Basel	(United Kingdom) Jessica Gadirova	(Russia) Angelina Melnikova	(Italy) Vanessa Ferrari
2022	(Germany) Munich	(United Kingdom) Jessica Gadirova	(Italy) Martina Maggio	(Italy) Angela Andreoli
2023	(Turkey) Antalya	(United Kingdom) Jessica Gadirova	(United Kingdom) Alice Kinsella	(Romania) Sabrina Voinea
2024	(Italy) Rimini	(Italy) Manila Esposito	(Romania) Sabrina Voinea	(Italy) Angela Andreoli
2025	(Germany) Leipzig	(Romania) Ana Bărbosu	(Italy) Manila Esposito	(Spain) Alba Petisco
2026	(Croatia) Zagreb	(Italy) Manila Esposito	(France) Elena Colas	(Russia) Angelina Melnikova

== Medal table ==
Rank	Nation	Gold	Silver	Bronze	Total
1	Romania (ROU)	15	10	12	37
2	Soviet Union (URS)	13	10	5	28
3	Great Britain (GBR)	5	6	1	12
4	Russia (RUS)	4	4	6	14
5	Italy (ITA)	4	4	4	12
6	France (FRA)	4	2	1	7
7	Ukraine (UKR)	3	1	2	6
8	Czechoslovakia (TCH)	2	0	4	6
9	East Germany (GDR)	1	3	1	5
10	Switzerland (SUI)	1	0	2	3
11	Yugoslavia (YUG)	1	0	1	2
12	Netherlands (NED)	0	2	2	4
13	Spain (ESP)	0	1	2	3
14	Sweden (SWE)	0	1	0	1
14	Turkey (TUR)	0	1	0	1
16	Bulgaria (BUL)	0	0	2	2
16	Hungary (HUN)	0	0	2	2
18	Belgium (BEL)	0	0	1	1
18	Israel (ISR)	0	0	1	1
Totals (19 entries)		53	45	49	147

Notes

- At the 2026 European Championships, the Croatian government banned the use of Russian flags and emblems despite World Gymnastics lifting the ban on Russian athletes; therefore the Russian team competed under the banner World Gymnastics 2. Their results here are attributed to Russia.
