= 1994 European Women's Artistic Gymnastics Championships =

20th European Women's Artistic Gymnastics Championships
- Location: Stockholm, Sweden
- Dates: 12–15 May 1994

The 20th European Women's Artistic Gymnastics Championships were held in Stockholm, Sweden, in May 1994.

== Medalists ==
Event	Gold	Silver	Bronze
Seniors
Team	Romania; Simona Amânar; Gina Gogean; Lavinia Miloșovici	Russia; Dina Kochetkova; Svetlana Khorkina; Oksana Fabrichnova	Ukraine; Irina Bulakhova; Lilia Podkopayeva; Natalia Kalinina
All-Around	Gina Gogean (ROU)	Svetlana Khorkina (RUS); Dina Kochetkova (RUS)	
Vault	Lavinia Miloșovici (ROU)	Elena Piskun (BLR)	Lilia Podkopayeva (UKR)
Uneven Bars	Svetlana Khorkina (RUS)	Oksana Fabrichnova (RUS)	Mercedes Pacheco (ESP)
Balance Beam	Gina Gogean (ROU)	Lilia Podkopayeva (UKR)	Lavinia Miloșovici (ROU)
Floor	Lilia Podkopayeva (UKR)	Lavinia Miloșovici (ROU)	Dina Kochetkova (RUS); Gina Gogean (ROU)
Juniors
All-Around	Alexandra Marinescu (ROU)	Laetitia Begue (FRA)	Ana Maria Bican (ROU)
Vault	Ana Maria Bican (ROU)	Nikolett Krausz (HUN)	Vasiliki Tsavdaridou (GRE)
Uneven Bars	Isabelle Severino (FRA)	Elena Lebedeva (RUS)	Olga Teslenko (UKR)
Balance Beam	Alexandra Marinescu (ROU)	Lyubov Sheremeta (UKR)	Elvire Teza (FRA)
Floor	Claudia Presacan (ROU)	Lyubov Sheremeta (UKR)	Alexandra Marinescu (ROU)

== Senior results ==
=== All-around ===
Rank	Gymnast	Vault (gymnastics)	Uneven bars	Balance beam	Floor (gymnastics)	Total
1st place, gold medalist(s)	Gina Gogean (ROM)	9.837	9.825	9.912	9.837	39.411
2nd place, silver medalist(s)	Svetlana Khorkina (RUS)	9.850	9.862	9.737	9.775	39.224
2nd place, silver medalist(s)	Dina Kochetkova (RUS)	9.750	9.875	9.762	9.837	39.224
4	Irina Bulakhova (UKR)	9.593	9.787	9.687	9.837	38.762
5	Lilia Podkopayeva (UKR)	9.762	9.300	9.800	9.875	38.737
6	Lavinia Miloșovici (ROM)	9.824	9.250	9.800	9.850	38.724
7	Oksana Fabrichnova (RUS)	9.749	9.300	9.825	9.837	38.711
8	Natalia Kalinina (UKR)	9.712	9.662	9.512	9.600	38.486
9	Cécile Canqueteau (FRA)	9.756	9.587	9.412	9.450	38.205
10	Mercedes Pacheco (ESP)	9.412	9.737	9.600	9.312	38.061
11	Mónica Martín (ESP)	9.718	9.625	9.237	9.462	38.042
12	Elena Piskun (BLR)	9.868	9.800	8.400	9.700	37.768
13	Julia Stratmann (GER)	9.237	9.150	9.662	9.650	37.699
14	Karin Szymko (GBR)	9.481	9.312	9.250	9.262	37.305
14	Virginia Karentzou (GRE)	9.443	9.575	8.600	9.687	37.305
16	Svetlana Tarasevich (BLR)	9.574	9.125	9.000	9.425	37.124
17	Klaudia Kinská (SVK)	9.725	9.137	9.087	8.975	36.924
18	Lambrini Apostolidou (GRE)	9.337	8.812	9.237	9.425	36.811
19	Nadezhda Tarvida (LAT)	9.493	9.162	8.350	9.400	36.405
20	Ludmilla Prince (LAT)	9.156	8.712	9.812	8.687	36.367
21	Gabriela Krčmárová (CZE)	8.868	9.500	9.100	9.087	36.205
22	Galina Lazarova (BUL)	9.412	9.087	8.600	8.900	35.999
23	Jessica Andreasson (SWE)	9.418	8.912	8.262	9.300	35.892
24	Jekaterina Savenkova (EST)	9.312	8.412	8.725	8.937	35.386

=== Vault ===
Rank	Gymnast	Total
1st place, gold medalist(s)	Lavinia Miloșovici (ROU)	9.800
2nd place, silver medalist(s)	Elena Piskun (BLR)	9.793
3rd place, bronze medalist(s)	Lilia Podkopayeva (UKR)	9.787
4	Gina Gogean (ROU)	9.775
5	Svetlana Khorkina (RUS)	9.749
6	Oksana Fabrichnova (RUS)	9.712
7	Cécile Canqueteau (FRA)	9.468
8	Élodie Lussac (FRA)	9.318

=== Uneven bars ===
Rank	Gymnast	Total
1st place, gold medalist(s)	Svetlana Khorkina (RUS)	9.887
2nd place, silver medalist(s)	Oksana Fabrichnova (RUS)	9.837
3rd place, bronze medalist(s)	Mercedes Pacheco (ESP)	9.800
4	Svetlana Tarasevich (BLR)	9.775
5	Elena Piskun (BLR)	9.750
6	Lilia Podkopayeva (UKR)	9.737
7	Lavinia Miloșovici (ROU)	9.725
8	Gina Gogean (ROU)	9.625

=== Balance beam ===
Rank	Gymnast	Total
1st place, gold medalist(s)	Gina Gogean (ROU)	9.900
2nd place, silver medalist(s)	Lilia Podkopayeva (UKR)	9.862
3rd place, bronze medalist(s)	Lavinia Miloșovici (ROU)	9.850
4	Elena Piskun (BLR)	9.787
5	Svetlana Khorkina (RUS)	9.775
6	Élodie Lussac (FRA)	9.700
6	Oksana Fabrichnova (RUS)	9.700
8	Mónica Martín (ESP)	9.587

=== Floor exercise ===
Rank	Gymnast	Total
1st place, gold medalist(s)	Lilia Podkopayeva (UKR)	9.937
2nd place, silver medalist(s)	Lavinia Miloșovici (ROU)	9.887
3rd place, bronze medalist(s)	Dina Kochetkova (RUS)	9.850
3rd place, bronze medalist(s)	Gina Gogean (ROU)	9.850
5	Elena Piskun (BLR)	9.800
6	Irina Bulakhova (UKR)	9.687
7	Annika Reeder (GBR)	9.675
8	Svetlana Khorkina (RUS)	9.350

== Junior results ==
=== All-around ===
Rank	Gymnast	Vault (gymnastics)	Uneven bars	Balance beam	Floor (gymnastics)	Total
1st place, gold medalist(s)	Alexandra Marinescu (ROM)	9.637	9.725	9.800	9.712	38.874
2nd place, silver medalist(s)	Laetitia Begue (FRA)	9.537	9.775	9.737	9.750	38.799
3rd place, bronze medalist(s)	Ana Maria Bican (ROM)	9.825	9.725	9.662	9.562	38.774
4	Elena Lebedeva (RUS)	9.750	9.812	9.375	9.775	38.712
5	Elena Grosheva (RUS)	9.525	9.675	9.737	9.725	38.662
6	Elvire Teza (FRA)	9.737	9.675	9.387	9.712	38.511
7	Claudia Presacan (ROM)	9.787	9.725	9.187	9.725	38.424
8	Nikolett Krausz (HUN)	9.787	9.487	9.075	9.762	38.111
9	Joana Juárez (ESP)	9.387	9.687	9.425	9.462	37.961
10	Isabelle Severino (FRA)	9.475	9.800	9.137	9.462	37.874
11	Lyubov Sheremeta (UKR)	9.350	9.287	9.475	9.737	37.849
12	Vasiliki Tsavdaridou (GRE)	9.650	9.250	9.162	9.712	37.774
13	Viktoria Bakos (HUN)	9.462	9.100	9.362	9.750	37.674
14	Viktoria Burban (UKR)	9.437	9.475	9.162	9.537	37.611
15	Olga Teslenko (UKR)	9.325	9.700	8.862	9.137	37.024
16	Yvonne Pioch (GER)	9.575	9.125	8.987	9.312	36.999
17	Susana García (ESP)	9.400	9.387	8.875	9.262	36.924
18	Yulia Sobko (BLR)	9.425	8.750	9.337	9.387	36.899
19	Tatiana Zharganova (BLR)	9.312	9.400	9.087	8.962	36.761
20	Natalia Ivanova (RUS)	9.475	9.312	8.562	9.375	36.724
21	Sonia Lawrence (GBR)	9.387	9.125	8.812	9.350	36.674
22	Yulia Kovaleva (LTU)	9.412	9.462	8.637	9.125	36.636
23	Elena Ivanova (BUL)	9.212	8.812	9.425	9.137	36.586
24	Vassiliki Papanikolaou (GRE)	9.250	9.387	8.475	9.400	36.512

=== Vault ===
Rank	Gymnast	Total
1st place, gold medalist(s)	Ana Maria Bican (ROU)	9.768
2nd place, silver medalist(s)	Nikolett Krausz (HUN)	9.743
3rd place, bronze medalist(s)	Vasiliki Tsavdaridou (GRE)	9.718
4	Claudia Presacan (ROU)	9.662
5	Yvonne Pioch (GER)	9.649
6	Elena Lebedeva (RUS)	9.537
7	Elvire Teza (FRA)	9.274
8	Laetitia Begue (FRA)	9.225

=== Uneven bars ===
Rank	Gymnast	Total
1st place, gold medalist(s)	Isabelle Severino (FRA)	9.825
2nd place, silver medalist(s)	Elena Lebedeva (RUS)	9.812
3rd place, bronze medalist(s)	Olga Teslenko (UKR)	9.775
4	Laetitia Begue (FRA)	9.762
5	Joana Juárez (ESP)	9.687
6	Alexandra Marinescu (ROU)	9.562
7	Ana Maria Bican (ROU)	9.350
7	Elena Grosheva (RUS)	9.350

=== Balance beam ===
Rank	Gymnast	Total
1st place, gold medalist(s)	Alexandra Marinescu (ROU)	9.887
2nd place, silver medalist(s)	Lyubov Sheremeta (UKR)	9.775
3rd place, bronze medalist(s)	Elvire Teza (FRA)	9.525
4	Elena Lebedeva (RUS)	9.500
5	Laetitia Begue (FRA)	9.487
6	Natalia Ivanova (RUS)	9.212
7	Ana Maria Bican (ROU)	9.112
8	Joana Juárez (ESP)	8.387

=== Floor exercise ===
Rank	Gymnast	Total
1st place, gold medalist(s)	Claudia Presacan (ROU)	9.850
2nd place, silver medalist(s)	Lyubov Sheremeta (UKR)	9.812
3rd place, bronze medalist(s)	Alexandra Marinescu (ROU)	9.787
4	Elena Lebedeva (RUS)	9.750
5	Viktoria Bakos (HUN)	9.725
6	Elvire Teza (FRA)	9.700
7	Nikolett Krausz (HUN)	9.675
8	Laetitia Begue (FRA)	9.600
