= 1996 European Women's Artistic Gymnastics Championships =

21st European Women's Artistic Gymnastics Championships
- Location: Birmingham, England
- Dates: 16–19 May 1996

The 21st European Women's Artistic Gymnastics Championships were held from 16-19 May 1996 in Birmingham, England.

== Medalists ==
Event	Gold	Silver	Bronze
Seniors
Team	Romania; Lavinia Miloșovici; Gina Gogean; Simona Amânar; Ana Maria Bican; Andreea Cacovean	Russia; Dina Kochetkova; Svetlana Khorkina; Rozalia Galiyeva; Oksana Lyapina	Ukraine; Liubov Sheremeta; Anna Mirgorodskaya; Lilia Podkopayeva
All-Around	Lilia Podkopayeva (UKR)	Svetlana Boginskaya (BLR)	Lavinia Miloșovici (ROU)
Vault	Simona Amânar (ROU)	Gina Gogean (ROU)	Lilia Podkopayeva (UKR)
Uneven Bars	Svetlana Khorkina (RUS); Simona Amânar (ROU); Lilia Podkopayeva (UKR)	none awarded	none awarded
Balance Beam	Rozalia Galiyeva (RUS)	Gina Gogean (ROU)	Elena Piskun (BLR)
Floor	Lilia Podkopayeva (UKR); Lavinia Miloșovici (ROU)	none awarded	Dina Kochetkova (RUS); Joana Juárez (ESP)
Juniors
Team	Russia; Elena Zamolodchikova; Ksenia Bogdanova; Ludmila Ezhova; Anna Kovalyova; Julia Grichko	France; Elvire Teza; Émilie Volle; Orélie Troscompt; Fanny Cottencin; Magalie Ruffato	Ukraine; Viktoria Karpenko; Olga Teslenko; Olga Kozlova; Yelena Zhyikova; Inha Shkarupa
All-Around	Alexandra Marinescu (ROU)	Adriana Crisci (ITA)	Viktoria Karpenko (UKR)
Vault	Maria Olaru (ROU)	Elena Zamolodchikova (RUS)	Inha Shkarupa (UKR)
Uneven Bars	Elvire Teza (FRA)	Olga Teslenko (UKR); Alexandra Marinescu (ROU)	none awarded
Balance Beam	Alexandra Marinescu (ROU)	Elvire Teza (FRA)	Ludmila Ezhova (RUS)
Floor	Viktoria Karpenko (UKR)	Adriana Crisci (ITA)	Alexandra Marinescu (ROU)

=== Medal table ===
==== Combined ====
Rank	Nation	Gold	Silver	Bronze	Total
1	Romania (ROU)	7	3	2	12
2	Ukraine (UKR)	4	1	5	10
3	Russia (RUS)	3	2	2	7
4	France (FRA)	1	2	0	3
5	Italy (ITA)	0	2	0	2
6	Belarus (BLR)	0	1	1	2
7	Spain (ESP)	0	0	1	1
Totals (7 entries)		15	11	11	37

==== Seniors ====
Rank	Nation	Gold	Silver	Bronze	Total
1	Romania (ROU)	4	2	1	7
2	Ukraine (UKR)	3	0	2	5
3	Russia (RUS)	2	1	1	4
4	Belarus (BLR)	0	1	1	2
5	Spain (ESP)	0	0	1	1
Totals (5 entries)		9	4	6	19

==== Juniors ====
Rank	Nation	Gold	Silver	Bronze	Total
1	Romania (ROU)	3	1	1	5
2	France (FRA)	1	2	0	3
3	Ukraine (UKR)	1	1	3	5
4	Russia (RUS)	1	1	1	3
5	Italy (ITA)	0	2	0	2
Totals (5 entries)		6	7	5	18

== Senior results ==
=== All-around ===
Rank	Gymnast	Vault (gymnastics)	Uneven bars	Balance beam	Floor (gymnastics)	Total
1st place, gold medalist(s)	Lilia Podkopayeva (UKR)	9.806	9.725	9.762	9.912	39.205
2nd place, silver medalist(s)	Svetlana Boginskaya (BLR)	9.731	9.825	9.775	9.775	39.106
3rd place, bronze medalist(s)	Lavinia Miloșovici (ROM)	9.793	9.837	9.637	9.800	39.067
4	Simona Amânar (ROM)	9.831	9.737	9.612	9.762	38.942
5	Dina Kochetkova (RUS)	9.656	9.762	9.525	9.787	38.730
6	Svetlana Khorkina (RUS)	9.750	9.750	9.262	9.787	38.549
7	Vasiliki Tsavdaridou (GRE)	9.425	9.612	9.600	9.625	38.262
8	Mónica Martín (ESP)	9.549	9.500	9.525	9.662	38.236
9	Ludivine Furnon (FRA)	9.474	9.537	9.387	9.712	38.110
10	Joana Juárez (ESP)	9.649	9.637	9.037	9.700	38.023
11	Elena Piskun (BLR)	9.187	9.787	9.575	9.350	37.899
12	Nikolett Krausz (HUN)	9.581	9.175	9.362	9.737	37.855
13	Annika Reeder (GBR)	9.431	9.262	9.325	9.525	37.543
14	Kathleen Stark (GER)	9.543	9.037	9.362.	9.537	37.479
15	Giordana Rocchi (ITA)	9.531	9.437	9.037	9.462	37.467
16	Ludmilla Prince (LAT)	9.487	9.400	8.925	9.512	37.324
17	Liubov Sheremeta (UKR)	9.512	9.187	8.887	9.625	37.211
18	Pascale Grossenbacher (SUI)	9.443	9.500	8.862	9.350	37.155
19	Adi Peer (ISR)	9.118	9.525	8.687	9.375	36.705
20	Ilena Menghesso (ITA)	9.468	9.150	8.525	9.462	36.605
21	Cindy Klemrath (GER)	9.462	9.187	8.225	9.362	36.236
22	Gabriela Krčmárová (CZE)	9.268	9.175	8.525	9.187	36.155
23	Maya Shani (ISR)	9.437	8.600	8.587	9.237	35.861
24	Monique Cohnen (BEL)	9.043	8.275	8.912	9.350	35.580

=== Vault ===
Rank	Gymnast	Total
1st place, gold medalist(s)	Simona Amânar (ROU)	9.774
2nd place, silver medalist(s)	Gina Gogean (ROU)	9.768
3rd place, bronze medalist(s)	Lilia Podkopayeva (UKR)	9.756
4	Dina Kochetkova (RUS)	9.725
4	Svetlana Khorkina (RUS)	9.725
6	Svetlana Boginskaya (BLR)	9.662
7	Joana Juárez (ESP)	9.518
8	Einat Kedar (ISR)	9.418

=== Uneven bars ===
Rank	Gymnast	Total
1st place, gold medalist(s)	Svetlana Khorkina (RUS)	9.825
1st place, gold medalist(s)	Simona Amânar (ROU)	9.825
1st place, gold medalist(s)	Lilia Podkopayeva (UKR)	9.825
4	Lavinia Miloșovici (ROU)	9.800
5	Liubov Sheremeta (UKR)	9.775
6	Elena Piskun (BLR)	9.725
6	Svetlana Boginskaya (BLR)	9.725
8	Dina Kochetkova (RUS)	9.262

=== Balance beam ===
Rank	Gymnast	Total
1st place, gold medalist(s)	Rozalia Galiyeva (RUS)	9.725
2nd place, silver medalist(s)	Gina Gogean (ROU)	9.712
3rd place, bronze medalist(s)	Elena Piskun (BLR)	9.650
4	Svetlana Boginskaya (BLR)	9.575
5	Simona Amânar (ROU)	9.562
6	Liubov Sheremeta (UKR)	9.450
7	Dina Kochetkova (RUS)	9.000
8	Anna Mirgorodskaya (UKR)	8.762

=== Floor exercise ===
Rank	Gymnast	Total
1st place, gold medalist(s)	Lilia Podkopayeva (UKR)	9.862
1st place, gold medalist(s)	Lavinia Miloșovici (ROU)	9.862
3rd place, bronze medalist(s)	Dina Kochetkova (RUS)	9.800
3rd place, bronze medalist(s)	Joana Juárez (ESP)	9.800
5	Rozalia Galiyeva (RUS)	9.762
6	Svetlana Boginskaya (BLR)	9.600
7	Simona Amânar (ROU)	9.562
8	Elena Piskun (BLR)	9.412

== Junior Results ==
=== All-around ===
Rank	Gymnast	Vault (gymnastics)	Uneven bars	Balance beam	Floor (gymnastics)	Total
1st place, gold medalist(s)	Alexandra Marinescu (ROM)	9.549	9.700	9.562	9.662	38.473
2nd place, silver medalist(s)	Adriana Crisci (ITA)	9.599	9.662	9.462	9.500	38.223
3rd place, bronze medalist(s)	Viktoria Karpenko (UKR)	9.562	9.687	9.625	9.150	38.024
4	Elvire Teza (FRA)	9.531	9.775	9.012	9.587	37.905
5	Elena Zamolodchikova (RUS)	9.700	9.687	8.800	9.537	37.724
5	Maria Olaru (ROM)	9.662	9.612	8.975	9.475	37.724
7	Gemma Paz (ESP)	9.343	9.512	9.162	9.637	37.654
8	Ksenia Bogdanova (RUS)	9.549	9.325	9.050	9.462	37.386
9	Lisa Mason (GBR)	9.443	8.875	9.400	9.475	37.193
10	Diana Teixeira (POR)	9.456	9.625	8.887	9.162	37.130
11	Birgit Schweigert (GER)	9.393	9.612	9.250	8.850	37.105
12	Émilie Volle (FRA)	9.356	9.500	8.812	9.387	37.055
13	Eva Ševcová (SVK)	9.362	9.212	9.125	9.125	36.824
14	Zuzana Sekerová (SVK)	9.281	9.312	8.962	9.125	36.680
15	Anna Nilsson (SWE)	9.193	9.312	8.850	8.900	36.255
16	Natalie Lucitt (GBR)	9.206	8.787	9.025	9.150	36.168
17	Nina Zarzhitskaya (BLR)	9.406	8.562	8.550	9.500	36.018
18	Eva Filo (HUN)	9.374	8.950	8.525	9.100	35.949
19	Gabriella Onodi (HUN)	9.343	8.262	9.225	8.725	35.555
20	Michaela Knorrova (CZE)	9.006	8.925	8.387	9.187	35.505
21	Diana Plaza (ESP)	9.493	7.875	8.812	9.325	35.505
22	Tatiana Tessyuk (BLR)	9.443	8.737	8.200	8.725	35.195
23	Olga Menin (ISR)	8.418	9.212	8.537	8.875	35.042
24	Vesna Stavrev (SLO)	9.112	7.525	8.800	9.000	34.437

=== Vault ===
Rank	Gymnast	Total
1st place, gold medalist(s)	Maria Olaru (ROU)	9.687
2nd place, silver medalist(s)	Elena Zamolodchikova (RUS)	9.668
3rd place, bronze medalist(s)	Inha Shkarupa (UKR)	9.662
4	Anna Kovalyova (RUS)	9.631
5	Ainhoa Aguado (ESP)	9.599
6	Alexandra Marinescu (ROU)	9.543
7	Andrea Behunová (SVK)	9.487
8	Adriana Crisci (ITA)	9.268

=== Uneven bars ===
Rank	Gymnast	Total
1st place, gold medalist(s)	Elvire Teza (FRA)	9.812
2nd place, silver medalist(s)	Olga Teslenko (UKR)	9.725
2nd place, silver medalist(s)	Alexandra Marinescu (ROU)	9.725
4	Viktoria Karpenko (UKR)	9.712
5	Martina Bremini (ITA)	9.675
6	Émilie Volle (FRA)	9.500
7	Ludmila Ezhova (RUS)	9.225
8	Kirsten Visser (NED)	8.950

=== Balance beam ===
Rank	Gymnast	Total
1st place, gold medalist(s)	Alexandra Marinescu (ROU)	9.750
2nd place, silver medalist(s)	Elvire Teza (FRA)	9.675
3rd place, bronze medalist(s)	Ludmila Ezhova (RUS)	9.412
4	Viktoria Karpenko (UKR)	9.387
5	Adriana Crisci (ITA)	8.987
6	Olga Teslenko (UKR)	8.750
7	Eva Ševcová (SVK)	8.700
8	Diana Teixeira (POR)	8.625

=== Floor exercise ===
Rank	Gymnast	Total
1st place, gold medalist(s)	Viktoria Karpenko (UKR)	9.675
2nd place, silver medalist(s)	Adriana Crisci (ITA)	9.662
3rd place, bronze medalist(s)	Alexandra Marinescu (ROU)	9.625
4	Martina Bremini (ITA)	9.562
5	Orélie Troscompt (FRA)	9.500
6	Ksenia Bogdanova (RUS)	9.475
7	Maria Olaru (ROU)	9.412
8	Elena Zamolodchikova (RUS)	9.125
