= 1996 World Artistic Gymnastics Championships =

Gymnastics competition

- Venue: Roberto Clemente Coliseum
- Location: San Juan, Puerto Rico
- Start date: April 16, 1996
- End date: April 20, 1996

The 1996 World Artistic Gymnastics Championships were held in San Juan, Puerto Rico, from 16 to 20 April 1996.

The team and all-around events were not contested at the 1996 Artistic Gymnastics World Championships. The format was similar to that of the 1992 and 2002 Worlds, with medals being awarded for the individual WAG and MAG apparatus. There were three rounds of competition: the preliminary round open to everyone; the semi-finals open to the top sixteen qualifiers; and the finals for the top eight gymnasts. Until 2021, the 1996 Artistic Gymnastics World Championships were also the last to be held in the same year as a Summer Olympics.

== Medalists ==
Event	Gold	Silver	Bronze
Men
Floor	(Belarus) Vitaly Scherbo	(Russia) Alexei Voropaev	(Ukraine) Grigory Misutin
Pommel horse	(North Korea) Pae Gil-Su	(Switzerland) Donghua Li	(Russia) Alexei Nemov
Rings	(Italy) Yuri Chechi	(Bulgaria) Yordan Yovchev (Hungary) Szilveszter Csollány	none awarded
Vault	(Russia) Alexei Nemov	(South Korea) Yeo Hong-Chul (Italy) Andrea Massucchi	none awarded
Parallel Bars	(Ukraine) Rustam Sharipov	(Russia) Alexei Nemov (Belarus) Vitaly Scherbo	none awarded
Horizontal bar	(Spain) Jesús Carballo	(Bulgaria) Krasimir Dunev	(Belarus) Vitaly Scherbo
Women
Vault	(Romania) Gina Gogean	(Romania) Simona Amânar	(Cuba) Annia Portuondo
Uneven bars	(Russia) Svetlana Khorkina (Belarus) Elena Piskun	none awarded	(France) Isabelle Severino
Balance beam	(Russia) Dina Kochetkova	(Romania) Alexandra Marinescu	(United States) Dominique Dawes (China) Liu Xuan
Floor	(China) Kui Yuanyuan (Romania) Gina Gogean	none awarded	(Romania) Lavinia Miloșovici (Ukraine) Liubov Sheremeta

== Medal table ==
=== Overall ===
Rank	Nation	Gold	Silver	Bronze	Total
1	Russia (RUS)	3	2	1	6
2	Romania (ROU)	2	2	1	5
3	Belarus (BLR)	2	1	1	4
4	Italy (ITA)	1	1	0	2
5	Ukraine (UKR)	1	0	2	3
6	China (CHN)	1	0	1	2
7	North Korea (PRK)	1	0	0	1
7	Spain (ESP)	1	0	0	1
9	Bulgaria (BUL)	0	2	0	2
10	Hungary (HUN)	0	1	0	1
10	South Korea (KOR)	0	1	0	1
10	Switzerland (SUI)	0	1	0	1
13	Cuba (CUB)	0	0	1	1
13	France (FRA)	0	0	1	1
13	United States (USA)	0	0	1	1
Totals (15 entries)		12	11	9	32

=== Men ===
Rank	Nation	Gold	Silver	Bronze	Total
1	Russia	1	2	1	4
2	Belarus	1	1	1	3
3	Italy	1	1	0	2
4	Ukraine	1	0	1	2
5	North Korea	1	0	0	1
5	Spain	1	0	0	1
7	Bulgaria	0	2	0	2
8	Hungary	0	1	0	1
8	South Korea	0	1	0	1
8	Switzerland	0	1	0	1
Totals (10 entries)		6	9	3	18

=== Women ===
Rank	Nation	Gold	Silver	Bronze	Total
1	Romania	2	2	1	5
2	Russia	2	0	0	2
3	China	1	0	1	2
4	Belarus	1	0	0	1
5	Cuba	0	0	1	1
5	France	0	0	1	1
5	Ukraine	0	0	1	1
5	United States	0	0	1	1
Totals (8 entries)		6	2	6	14

== Men ==
=== Floor exercise ===
Rank	Gymnast	Total
1st place, gold medalist(s)	Vitaly Scherbo (BLR)	9.787
2nd place, silver medalist(s)	Alexei Voropaev (RUS)	9.700
3rd place, bronze medalist(s)	Grigory Misutin (UKR)	9.625
4	Sergei Fedorchenko (KAZ)	9.562
5	Ivan Ivankov (BLR)	9.550
5	Thierry Aymes (FRA)	9.525
7	Ivan Ivanov (BUL)	9.450
8	Evgeni Podgorni (RUS)	9.125
9	Freddy Behin (IRI)	9.100

=== Pommel horse ===
Rank	Gymnast	Total
1st place, gold medalist(s)	Pae Gil Su (PRK)	9.825
2nd place, silver medalist(s)	Donghua Li (SUI)	9.812
3rd place, bronze medalist(s)	Alexei Nemov (RUS)	9.787
4	Kim Hyon Il (PRK)	9.762
5	Patrice Casimir (FRA)	9.725
6	Eric Poujade (FRA)	9.700
7	Ivan Ivankov (BLR)	9.625
8	Grigory Misutin (UKR)	8.200

=== Rings ===
Rank	Gymnast	Total
1st place, gold medalist(s)	Yuri Chechi (ITA)	9.825
2nd place, silver medalist(s)	Szilveszter Csollány (HUN)	9.737
2nd place, silver medalist(s)	Yordan Yovchev (BUL)	9.737
4	Dan Burinca (ROU)	9.712
5	Ivan Ivankov (BLR)	9.675
5	Damian Merino (CUB)	9.675
7	Chris Lamorte (USA)	9.637
7	Alexei Voropaev (RUS)	9.637
9	Freddy Behin (IRI)	9.575

=== Vault ===
Rank	Gymnast	Total
1st place, gold medalist(s)	Alexei Nemov (RUS)	9.756
2nd place, silver medalist(s)	Yeo Hong-Chul (KOR)	9.743
2nd place, silver medalist(s)	Andrea Massucchi (ITA)	9.743
4	Sergei Fedorchenko (KAZ)	9.643
4	Vitaly Scherbo (BLR)	9.643
6	Dieter Rehm (SUI)	9.556
7	Valeri Belenki (GER)	9.437
8	Alexei Voropaev (RUS)	9.431
9	Zoltán Supola (HUN)	9.400
10	Freddy Behin (IRI)	9.343

=== Parallel bars ===
Rank	Gymnast	Total
1st place, gold medalist(s)	Rustam Sharipov (UKR)	9.750
2nd place, silver medalist(s)	Alexei Nemov (RUS)	9.737
2nd place, silver medalist(s)	Vitaly Scherbo (BLR)	9.737
4	Ivan Ivankov (BLR)	9.725
4	Jung Jin-Soo (KOR)	9.725
6	Ivan Ivanov (BUL)	9.650
7	Pae Gil Su (PRK)	9.625
8	Freddy Behin (IRI)	9.556

=== Horizontal bar ===
Rank	Gymnast	Total
1st place, gold medalist(s)	Jesús Carballo (ESP)	9.800
2nd place, silver medalist(s)	Krasimir Dunev (BUL)	9.775
3rd place, bronze medalist(s)	Vitaly Scherbo (BLR)	9.762
4	Aljaz Pegan (SLO)	9.750
5	Chainey Umphrey (USA)	9.712
6	Sergei Fedorchenko (KAZ)	9.475
7	Zoltán Supola (HUN)	9.375
8	Richard Ikeda (CAN)	8.075

== Women ==
=== Vault ===
Rank	Gymnast	Total
1st place, gold medalist(s)	Gina Gogean (ROU)	9.800
2nd place, silver medalist(s)	Simona Amânar (ROU)	9.787
3rd place, bronze medalist(s)	Annia Portuondo (CUB)	9.756
4	Elisabeth Valle (ESP)	9.668
5	Svetlana Khorkina (RUS)	9.637
6	Joana Juárez (ESP)	9.537
7	Vasiliki Tsavdaridou (GRE)	9.518
8	Leyva Bermudez (CUB)	9.456

=== Uneven bars ===
Rank	Gymnast	Total
1st place, gold medalist(s)	Svetlana Khorkina (RUS)	9.787
1st place, gold medalist(s)	Elena Piskun (BLR)	9.787
3rd place, bronze medalist(s)	Isabelle Severino (FRA)	9.775
4	Elvire Teza (FRA)	9.750
4	Liubov Sheremeta (UKR)	9.750
6	Anna Mirgorodskaya (UKR)	9.725
6	Kathleen Stark (GER)	9.725
8	Jaycie Phelps (USA)	9.712
9	Liu Xuan (CHN)	9.700
10	Lavinia Miloșovici (ROU)	9.687
11	Dominique Dawes (USA)	8.787

=== Balance beam ===
Rank	Gymnast	Total
1st place, gold medalist(s)	Dina Kochetkova (RUS)	9.887
2nd place, silver medalist(s)	Alexandra Marinescu (ROU)	9.812
3rd place, bronze medalist(s)	Dominique Dawes (USA)	9.800
3rd place, bronze medalist(s)	Liu Xuan (CHN)	9.800
5	Vasiliki Tsavdaridou (GRE)	9.675
6	Mercedes Pacheco (ESP)	9.637
7	Jaycie Phelps (USA)	9.187
8	Gina Gogean (ROU)	9.075

=== Floor exercise ===
Rank	Gymnast	Total
1st place, gold medalist(s)	Gina Gogean (ROU)	9.850
1st place, gold medalist(s)	Kui Yuanyuan (CHN)	9.850
3rd place, bronze medalist(s)	Lavinia Miloșovici (ROU)	9.800
3rd place, bronze medalist(s)	Liubov Sheremeta (UKR)	9.800
5	Gemma Paz (ESP)	9.775
5	Vasiliki Tsavdaridou (GRE)	9.775
7	Ludivine Furnon (FRA)	9.712
8	Roza Galieva (RUS)	9.637
