= Gymnastics at the 1996 Summer Olympics – Women's balance beam =

Women's balance beam at the Games of the XXVI Olympiad
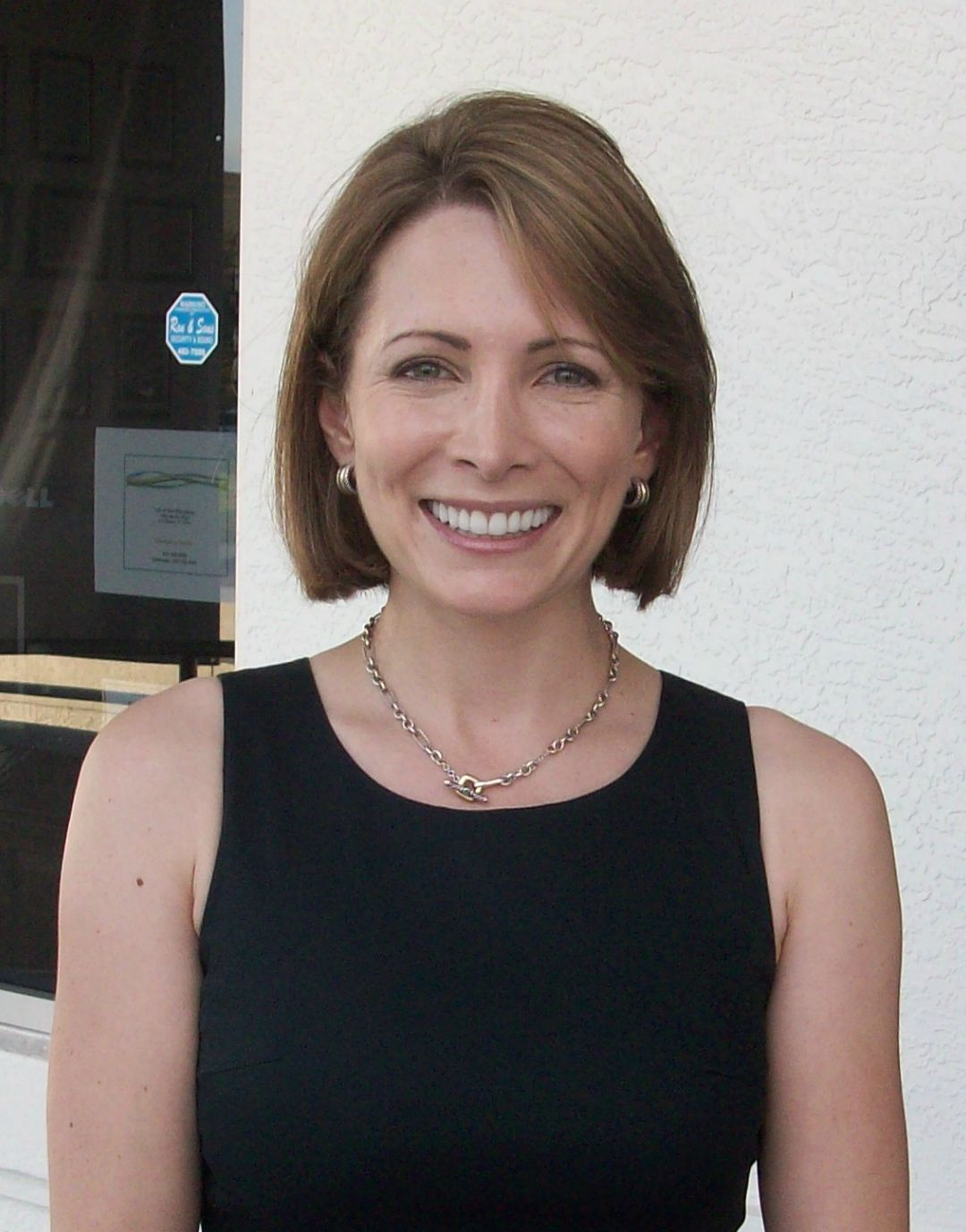
- Gold medalist Shannon Miller (2015)
- Venue: Georgia Dome
- Date: July 21 – 29, 1996
- Competitors: 96 from 28 nations

Medalists
1st place, gold medalist(s)		Shannon Miller	United States
2nd place, silver medalist(s)		Lilia Podkopayeva	Ukraine
3rd place, bronze medalist(s)		Gina Gogean	Romania

These are the results of the women's balance beam competition, one of six events for female competitors in artistic gymnastics at the 1996 Summer Olympics in Atlanta. The qualification and final rounds took place July 21, 23 and 29 at the Georgia Dome.

The medals for the competition were presented by Nat Indrapana, IOC Member, Thailand; and the medalists' bouquets were presented by Ivan Weber, FIG Executive Committee Member, Switzerland.

== Results ==
=== Qualification ===
Ninety-two gymnasts competed in the balance beam event during the compulsory and optional rounds on July 21 and 23. The eight highest scoring gymnasts advanced to the final on July 29. Each country was limited to two competitors in the final.

Rank	Gymnast	Score
1	Shannon Miller (USA)	19.599
2	Dominique Moceanu (USA)	19.537
3	Dina Kochetkova (RUS)	19.500
3	Lilia Podkopayeva (UKR)	19.500
5	Rozalia Galiyeva (RUS)	19.462
6	Gina Gogean (ROU)	19.262
7	Lavinia Miloșovici* (ROU)	19.225
8	Alexandra Marinescu** (ROU)	19.200
9	Olga Teslenko (UKR)	19.175

* Did not compete
** Replaced teammate Lavinia Milosovici

=== Final ===
Rank	Gymnast	Score
Gold medal	Shannon Miller (USA)	9.862
Silver medal	Lilia Podkopayeva (UKR)	9.825
Bronze medal	Gina Gogean (ROU)	9.787
4	Dina Kochetkova (RUS)	9.737
5	Olga Teslenko (UKR)	9.625
6	Dominique Moceanu (USA)	9.125
7	Rozalia Galiyeva (RUS)	9.112
8	Alexandra Marinescu (ROU)	8.462
