= List of Olympic female artistic gymnasts for Ukraine =

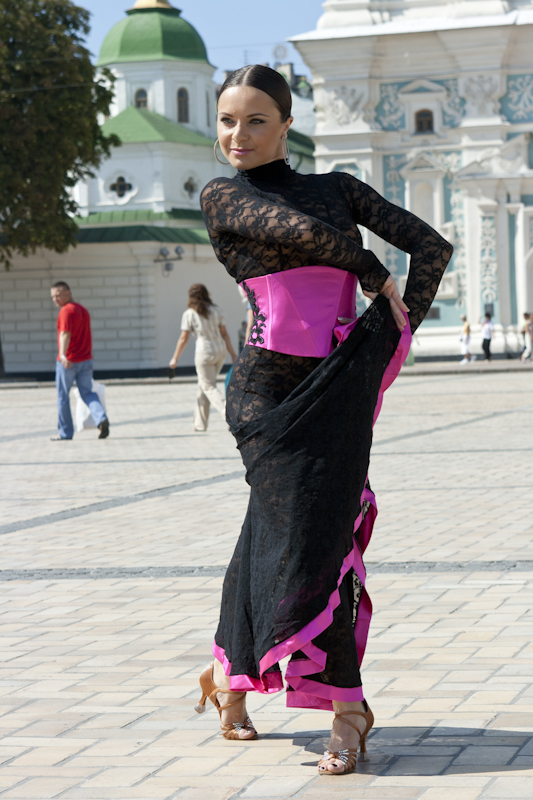
Lilia Podkopayeva

Ukrainian female gymnasts have competed in every Olympics since 1996. A total of 23 female gymnasts have represented Ukraine at the Olympics, but the only medalist is Lilia Podkopayeva. Lilia Podkopayeva won a total of 3 medals at the 1996 Summer Olympics, and she was the first multiple Olympic medalist from Ukraine. In the team competition, Ukraine finished 5th in 1996 and 2000, 4th in 2004, and 11th in 2008. Ukraine was only allowed to send one gymnast to the 2012 Summer Olympics, the 2016 Summer Olympics, and the 2020 Summer Olympics.

== Gymnasts ==
=== Summer Olympics ===
Gymnast	Years	Gold	Silver	Bronze	Total medals	Ref.
Mirabella Akhunu	2004	0	0	0	0	
Valentyna Holenkova	2008	0	0	0	0	
Viktoria Karpenko	2000	0	0	0	0	
Oksana Knijnik	1996	0	0	0	0	
Natalia Kononenko	2012	0	0	0	0	
Anastasiia Koval	2008	0	0	0	0	
Alina Kozich	2004, 2008	0	0	0	0	
Iryna Krasnianska	2004, 2008	0	0	0	0	
Alona Kvasha	2000, 2004	0	0	0	0	
Angelina Kysla	2016	0	0	0	0	
Anna Lashchevska	2024	0	0	0	0	
Anna Mirgorodskaya	1996	0	0	0	0	
Lilia Podkopayeva	1996	2	1	0	3	
Maryna Proskurina	2008	0	0	0	0	
Olga Roshchupkina	2000	0	0	0	0	
Olena Shaparna	1996	0	0	0	0	
Olga Sherbatykh	2004	0	0	0	0	
Lioubov Sheremeta	1996	0	0	0	0	
Olga Teslenko	1996, 2000	0	0	0	0	
Halyna Tyryk	2000	0	0	0	0	
Diana Varinska	2020	0	0	0	0	
Tetyana Yarosh	2000	0	0	0	0	
Irina Yarotska	2004	0	0	0	0	
Svetlana Zelepoukina	1996	0	0	0	0	
Dariya Zgoba	2008	0	0	0	0	

=== Youth Olympic Games ===
Gymnast	Years	Gold	Silver	Bronze	Total medals	Ref.
Alina Kravchenko	2010	0	0	0	0	
Anastasia Bachynska	2018	0	0	2	2	

== Medalists ==
Medal	Name	Year	Event
Gold	Lilia Podkopayeva	(United States) 1996 Atlanta	Women's all-around
Silver	Lilia Podkopayeva	(United States) 1996 Atlanta	Women's balance beam
Gold	Lilia Podkopayeva	(United States) 1996 Atlanta	Women's floor exercise

== See also ==
- List of Olympic male artistic gymnasts for Ukraine
