= Pioch =

Pioch is a surname. It is mainly of Polish origin, a variant of the personal name Piotr. Notable people with the surname include:

- Georges Pioch (1873–1953), French poet
- Yvonne Pioch (born 1980), German gymnast
