= Andrea Massucchi =

Italian artistic gymnast

- Born: 1974
- Died: November 16, 1997 Vercelli, Italy

Gymnastics career
- Discipline: Men's artistic gymnastics
- Country represented: Italy
Medal record
Men's artistic gymnastics
Representing Italy
World Championships
Silver medal – second place	1996 San Juan	Vault

Andrea Massucchi (born 1974) was an Italian artistic gymnast. He won the silver medal on vault at the 1996 World Artistic Gymnastics Championships in San Juan, tied with Yeo Hong-chul and placing behind Alexei Nemov.
