= Svetlana Tarasevich =

Belarusian gymnast (born 1979)

Personal information
- Nationality: Belarusian
- Born: 14 August 1979 (age 46); Grodno, Byelorussian SSR, Soviet Union

Sport
- Sport: Gymnastics

Svetlana Tarasevich (born 14 August 1979) is a Belarusian former gymnast. She competed in five events at the 1996 Summer Olympics.

== Eponymous skill ==
Tarasevich has one eponymous skill listed in the Code of Points.

Apparatus	Name	Description	Difficulty (Note: Valid for the 2025–2028 Code of Points)
Floor exercise	Tarasevich	Salto forward stretched with 2/1 turn (720°)	D (0.4)

== Competitive history ==
Year	Event	Team	AA	VT	UB	BB	FX
1994	Blume Memorial		8				
1994	European Championships		16		4		
1994	USA-BLR-CHN Tri-Meet		6				
1994	World Team Championships	6					
1995	International Mixed Pairs	10					
1995	Massilia Cup			1st place, gold medalist(s)			
1995	World Championships	8					
1996
1996	Olympic Games	6					
1997	SUI-CHN-BLR Tri-Meet		5				
1997	World Stars				8		
1999	Summer Universiade	4					7
