= Inha Shkarupa =

Ukrainian gymnast (born 1981)

- Born: 9 September 1981 (age 44) Ternopil, Ukrainian SSR, Soviet Union
- Height: 150 cm (4 ft 11 in)

Gymnastics career
- Discipline: Women's artistic gymnastics
- Country represented: Ukraine
- Club: Dynamo Ternopil
- Head coach: Zinaida Gorbach
- Assistant coach: Tetiana Gerashchenko
- Retired: yes
Medal record
Women's artistic gymnastics
Representing Ukraine
World Championships
Bronze medal – third place	1999 Tianjin	Team
European Championships
Bronze medal – third place	1998 St. Petersburg	Team
European Team Championships
Silver medal – second place	1999 Patras	Team
Summer Universiade
Silver medal – second place	1999 Mallorca	Team
Junior European Championships
Bronze medal – third place	1996 Birmingham	Team
Bronze medal – third place	1996 Birmingham	Vault

Inha Shkarupa (born 9 September 1981 in Ternopil) is a retired Ukrainian gymnast.

== Career ==
Her first major achievement in international competitions is two bronze medals in team competition and vault event (juniors) at the 1996 European Women's Artistic Gymnastics Championships in Birmingham.

The following year, Shkarupa competed at the 1997 World Artistic Gymnastics Championships, finishing 4th in team competition and 12th in all-around event.

In 1998, Inha won a gold medal in all-around event at the French international tournament Paris-Bercy. She also represented Ukraine at the European Championships in Saint Petersburg, winning a bronze medal in team competition and finishing 8th in vault event.

The following year, she competed at the 1999 European Gymnastics Masters, winning a silver medal with Ukrainian team. Later, at the 1999 World Artistic Gymnastics Championships she won a bronze medal in team competition. She also received a silver medal at the 1999 Summer Universiade in team competition and finished 4th in all-around event.

In 2000, at the international tournament American Cup Series she finished fifth in all-around event.

Since 2000, she is a circus actress in Cirque Du Soleil in the United States.
