= Alexandra Marinescu =

Romanian artistic gymnast

- Full name: Alexandra Marinescu
- Nickname: Alex
- Born: 19 March 1982 (age 44) Bucharest, Romania

Gymnastics career
- Discipline: Women's artistic gymnastics
- Country represented: Romania
- Gym: Triumf Bucharest; Deva national training center
- Head coaches: Eliza Stoica; Octavian Bellu
- Assistant coach: Mariana Bitang
- Retired: 1998
Medal record
Women's Artistic Gymnastics
Representing Romania
Olympic Games
Bronze medal – third place	1996 Atlanta	Team
World Championships
Gold medal – first place	1995 Sabae	Team
Gold medal – first place	1997 Lausanne	Team
Silver medal – second place	1996 Puerto Rico	Balance beam
European Championships (Junior)
Gold medal – first place	1994 Stockholm	All-around
Gold medal – first place	1994 Stockholm	Balance beam
Gold medal – first place	1996 Birmingham	All-around
Gold medal – first place	1996 Birmingham	Balance beam
Silver medal – second place	1996 Birmingham	Uneven bars
Bronze medal – third place	1994 Stockholm	Floor exercise
Bronze medal – third place	1996 Birmingham	Floor

Alexandra Marinescu (born 19 March 1982) is a retired Romanian Olympic artistic gymnast. She is an Olympic bronze medalist with the team and a two-time world champion with the team. Individually, she is a world silver medalist on beam and a seven-time Junior European medalist. She currently works as a minimal electro DJ based in Bucharest.

== Biography ==
Marinescu was born in Bucharest. During her career as a competitive gymnast, she competed under a falsified passport which listed her year of birth as 1981; her age was advanced by one year to make her age-eligible for the 1995 World Championships and the 1996 Olympics. Her year of birth is still listed as 1981 in the official F.I.G. database, however, Marinescu herself has stated that this is incorrect and she was born in 1982. In a 2002 interview, she revealed, "Without asking for his permission, but rather communicating him their decision, they told my father that they had to modify my age by changing in the passport the year when I was born. Instead of 1982 they wrote 1981. They explained to my father that it was my only chance to get to the Olympic Games."

== Gymnastics career ==
As a young child, Marinescu was involved with swimming, but eventually switched over to gymnastics. Unlike many of her Romanian teammates, who transferred to the national training center in Deva as juniors, Marinescu spent the bulk of her career training at her home club, Triumf, in Bucharest with coach Eliza Stoica. She arrived at Deva in early 1996, during the buildup to the Atlanta Olympics.

As a result of the different training environment, Marinescu's gymnastics style stood out. She had long lines, elegant presentation and a sense of artistry that was missing from most routines crafted at Deva, but showed less difficulty in her tumbling and vaulting than Deva trained athletes such as Lavinia Miloșovici and Gina Gogean.

At the age of twelve, Marinescu was the European Junior Champion; the following year, she won the pre-Olympic test event in Atlanta. In 1996, she placed second on the balance beam at the World Championships and successfully defended her all-around title at the Junior European Championships. Leading into the 1996 Atlanta Olympics, Marinescu was touted as one of Romania's best chances for an individual medal, and was compared to legendary Romanian gymnast Nadia Comăneci by the media.

The Olympics proved to be a difficult competition for Marinescu. She contributed to the team bronze medal and qualified for the all-around final. However, coach Octavian Belu pulled her from the all-around and replaced her with teammate Simona Amânar. Belu's official reason, as given to the media, was that Marinescu did not "work hard enough." The real reason was far more likely Simona's massive 39.387 score in the All Around in Team Optionals, a score which would have won the All Around by 0.132 over Podkopayeva had she duplicated it in the All Around finals. Marinescu's only chance to shine at the Olympics came in the balance beam event final. She was the first competitor in the final, suffered two falls during her routine, and finished last with a score of 8.462.

Marinescu continued training in 1997, representing Romania at such competitions as the American Cup. At the World Championships in Lausanne she shared in the team gold medal, however, once again, she was pulled from the all-around finals in favor of Amânar.

== Post-retirement ==
Marinescu retired in early 1998, citing serious back problems. She has remained a public figure in Romanian gymnastics due to her outspoken criticism of the Deva coaches and training system. While former Romanian Gymnastics Federation president Adrian Stoica has denied Marinescu's allegations of abuse at Deva, many of her teammates have stepped forward in the Romanian press to corroborate and substantiate her claims.

Marinescu's experiences were detailed in the book Alexandra's Secrets, written by ProSport journalist Andrei Nourescu. The book, which was published in Romania in 2002, won the 2003 "Best Book of the Year" award from the Romanian Sports Press Association. An English-language translation entitled The Secrets of a Gymnast was released in the United States in January 2006.

Alexandra is currently doing some work as a DJ, playing Minimal. She has her own recurring radio show, called Nuances, on the internet radio DI.fm.

== Major results ==
1997 World Championships: 1st team
1997 American Cup: 5th AA
1996 Olympics: 3rd team; 8th BB
1996 World Championships: 2nd BB
1996 European Championships: 1st AA (junior)
1995 World Championships: 1st team; 4th BB; 4th UB
1995 Olympic Test Event: 1st AA
1994 European Championships: 1st AA; 1st BB; 3rd FX; 6th VT (junior)
1994 Balkan Championships: 1st UB
1993 Balkan Championships: 1st FX; 1st BB; 2nd AA (junior)
