= Elena Piskun =

Belarusian artistic gymnast

- Full name: Yelena Mikhaylovna Piskun
- Nickname: Lena
- Born: 2 February 1978 (age 48) Minsk, Byelorussian SSR, Soviet Union
- Height: 5 ft 0 in (1.52 m)

Gymnastics career
- Discipline: Women's artistic gymnastics
- Country represented: Belarus
- Head coach: Valery Kolodinsky
Medal record
Representing Belarus
World Championships
Gold medal – first place	1993 Birmingham	Vault
Gold medal – first place	1996 San Juan	Uneven Bars
European Championships
Silver medal – second place	1994 Stockholm	Vault
Bronze medal – third place	1996 Birmingham	Balance Beam
European Team Championships
Gold medal – first place	1997 Paris	Team

Elena (or Yelena) Mikhaylovna "Lena" Piskun (Belarusian: Алена Піскун; Russian: Елена Михайловна "Лена" Пискун [pʲɪˈskun]; born 2 February 1978) is a Belarusian former artistic gymnast who won two World Championship gold medals in the 1990s and competed at the 1996 Summer Olympics.

== Personal life ==
Piskun was born in Bobruisk, Belarus, in 1978. Her father worked in a tire factory, and her mother was a bookkeeper. She has a younger brother, Viktor. She is 5 feet 0 inches (1.52 m) tall. She currently lives in the United States.

== Career ==
Piskun started gymnastics at the age of six and was coached by Valery Kolodinsky during her career. The gym in her hometown of Bobruisk was small, so she traveled to Minsk to train before major competitions.

At the 1993 World Championships in Birmingham, England, Piskun won the gold medal on vault. In April 1994, she competed at the Individual World Championships in Brisbane, Australia, and finished fifth on vault with a score of 9.725 and fifth on floor exercise with a score of 9.675. At the World Championship Team Finals in Dortmund, Germany, in November, Piskun helped the Belarus team to a sixth-place finish. At the 1995 World Championships in Sabae, Japan, she was 10th in the all-around with a score of 38.53.

Piskun finished third on balance beam and eighth on floor exercise at the 1996 European Championships. In April, she competed at the World Championships in San Juan, Puerto Rico, and won a gold medal on uneven bars with a score of 9.787. At that year's Olympic Games in Atlanta, Piskun helped Belarus finish sixth in the team competition, and she was also 12th in the individual all-around with a score of 38.649. At the 1997 World Championships in Lausanne, Switzerland, she finished 30th in the all-around with a score of 35.474.

Piskun owns and coaches at Infinity Gymnastics in Alpharetta, Georgia.

== Competition History ==
Year	Event	TF	AA	VT	UB	BB	FX
1991	Cottbus International		1st place, gold medalist(s)				1st place, gold medalist(s)
1992	Chunichi Cup		5			2nd place, silver medalist(s)	
1992	Tokyo Cup			6		4	
1992	Medico Cup		5				
1992	CIS Cup		15				
1993	American Cup		3rd place, bronze medalist(s)				
1993	International Mixed Pairs	1st place, gold medalist(s)					
1993	Hungarian International		4				
1993	European Cup		14				
1993	French International				4	3rd place, bronze medalist(s)	2nd place, silver medalist(s)
1993	USA-BLR-UKR Meet		6				
1993	Soapberry World Challenge		2nd place, silver medalist(s)				
1993	Swiss Cup	1st place, gold medalist(s)					
1993	Gander Memorial		1st place, gold medalist(s)				
1993	World Championships			1st place, gold medalist(s)			
1993	Chunichi Cup		3rd place, bronze medalist(s)				
1994	DTB Cup		2nd place, silver medalist(s)				4
1994	American Cup		3rd place, bronze medalist(s)				
1994	Birmingham Classic		6				
1994	World Championships		10	5			5
1994	European Championships	5	12	2nd place, silver medalist(s)	5	4	5
1994	USA-BLR-CHN Tri-Meet	2nd place, silver medalist(s)	2nd place, silver medalist(s)				
1994	Goodwill Games		8		3rd place, bronze medalist(s)		
1994	International Mixed Pairs	2nd place, silver medalist(s)					
1994	Swiss Cup			1st place, gold medalist(s)	1st place, gold medalist(s)		7
1994	Team World Championships	6					
1995	Cottbus Cup			7	8	4	2nd place, silver medalist(s)
1995	DTB Cup			6	1st place, gold medalist(s)		3rd place, bronze medalist(s)
1995	European Cup		3rd place, bronze medalist(s)	4	4	2nd place, silver medalist(s)	8
1995	Hapoel Games		3rd place, bronze medalist(s)				
1995	Ostrava International		6				
1995	Varna Golden Sands International		1st place, gold medalist(s)				
1995	Gander Memorial		2nd place, silver medalist(s)				
1995	World Championships	8	10				
1995	Pre-Olympics		3rd place, bronze medalist(s)	3rd place, bronze medalist(s)	1st place, gold medalist(s)		
1996	Cottbus International			6	1st place, gold medalist(s)		5
1996	DTB Cup			5	3rd place, bronze medalist(s)	3rd place, bronze medalist(s)	2nd place, silver medalist(s)
1996	Gander Memorial		1st place, gold medalist(s)				
1996	Swiss Cup			4	3rd place, bronze medalist(s)	1st place, gold medalist(s)	4
1996	World Championships				1st place, gold medalist(s)		
1996	European Championships	4	11		6	3rd place, bronze medalist(s)	8
1996	Australia Cup		1st place, gold medalist(s)				
1996	Catania Cup		1st place, gold medalist(s)			1st place, gold medalist(s)	
1996	French International			5	4		
1996	Grand Prix of Rome		3rd place, bronze medalist(s)				
1996	ITA-BLR-ROM-RUS Meet		4				
1996	Olympic Games	6	12				
1997	Cottbus International				2nd place, silver medalist(s)		
1997	BLR-CHN-SUI Tri Meet	2nd place, silver medalist(s)	11				
1997	European Gymnastics Masters	1st place, gold medalist(s)					
1997	World Championships		30				
