= Liubov Sheremeta =

Ukrainian artistic gymnast (born 1980)

- Born: 17 January 1980 (age 46) Lviv, Ukrainian SSR, Soviet Union
- Height: 136 cm (4 ft 6 in)

Gymnastics career
- Discipline: Women's artistic gymnastics
- Country represented: Ukraine
Medal record
Women's artistic gymnastics
Representing Ukraine
World Championships
| Bronze medal – third place | 1996 San Juan | Floor exercise |
European Championships
| Bronze medal – third place | 1996 Birmingham | Team |
Junior European Championships
| Silver medal – second place | 1994 Stockholm | Balance beam |
| Silver medal – second place | 1994 Stockholm | Floor exercise |
European Youth Olympic Festival
| Bronze medal – third place | 1995 Bath | All-around |
| Bronze medal – third place | 1995 Bath | Balance beam |

Liubov Sheremeta (born 17 January 1980) is a Ukrainian former artistic gymnast. She competed at the 1996 Summer Olympics.

== Competitive history ==
| Year | Event | Team | AA | VT | UB | BB | FX |
Junior
| 1988 | Viktor Chukarin Tournament | | 2nd place, silver medalist(s) | | | | |
1994
| 1994 | Junior European Championships | 11 | | | | 2nd place, silver medalist(s) | 2nd place, silver medalist(s) |
Senior
| 1995 | Atlanta Gymnastics Invitational | | 11 | | | | |
| 1995 | China Cup | | 5 | | | | |
| 1995 | Chunichi Cup | | 4 | 4 | 2nd place, silver medalist(s) | 1st place, gold medalist(s) | |
| 1995 | Bath European Youth Olympic Days | | 3rd place, bronze medalist(s) | 4 | 4 | 3rd place, bronze medalist(s) | 4 |
| 1995 | Jr. CIS Championships | | 4 | | | | |
| 1995 | USA-UKR Dual Meet | | 14 | | | | |
| 1996 | Hungarian International | | 4 | | | | |
| 1996 | European Championships | | 17 | | 5 | 6 | |
| 1996 | World Championships | | | | 4 | | 3rd place, bronze medalist(s) |
| 1996 | UKR Cup | | 8 | | | | |
| 1996 | Olympic Games | 5 | 22 | | | | |
| 1997 | Gym Coupe Paris | | 1st place, gold medalist(s) | | | | |
| 1997 | Gym Pairs Tournament | 3rd place, bronze medalist(s) | | | | | |
| 1997 | Salamunov Memorial | | 1st place, gold medalist(s) | | | | |
| 1997 | Siska International | | 2nd place, silver medalist(s) | | | | |
| 1997 | World Championships | | 6 | | 4 | | |

== See also ==
- List of Olympic female gymnasts for Ukraine
