= Rozalia Galiyeva =

Artistic gymnast

- Full name: Rozaliya Ilfatovna Galiyeva
- Alternative name: Roza Galieva
- Born: 28 April 1977 (age 49) Olmaliq, Uzbek SSR, Soviet Union

Gymnastics career
- Discipline: Women's artistic gymnastics
- Country represented: Russia
- Former countries represented: Unified Team; Soviet Union; Uzbekistan
- Head coaches: Roza Borisovna Ishkova, Leonid Arkayev
- Retired: 1997
Medal record
Event	1st	2nd	3rd
Olympic Games	1	1	0
World Championships	1	0	0
European Championships	1	1	0

Olympic medal record

Women's Artistic Gymnastics

Olympic Games

Representing Unified Team
Gold medal – first place	1992 Barcelona	Team

Representing Russia
Silver medal – second place	1996 Atlanta	Team

World Championships

Representing Soviet Union
Gold medal – first place	1991 Indianapolis	Team

European Championships

Representing Russia
Gold medal – first place	1996 Birmingham	Balance Beam
Silver medal – second place	1996 Birmingham	Team

Rozaliya Ilfatovna Galiyeva (Розалия Ильфатовна Галиева; born 28 April 1977), also known as Roza Galieva, is a retired artistic gymnast who competed in the 1992 Summer Olympics and 1996 Summer Olympics.

== Personal life ==
Galiyeva was born on 28 April 1977 in Olmaliq, Uzbek SSR (now Uzbekistan). She became a Russian citizen in 1995. With her husband Mikhail, she has one son, Nikita, and one daughter, Tatyana.

== Career ==
=== 1991 to 1994 ===
Galiyeva began competing internationally for the USSR in 1991, sharing in the team gold medal at the 1991 World Championships in Indianapolis.

She competed with the Unified Team at the 1992 Olympics in Barcelona, Spain. She exceeded expectations in the preliminary competition, finishing 8th and qualifying for the individual all-around final behind teammates Svetlana Boguinskaya and Tatiana Lysenko.

However, before the all-around, coach Alexander Alexandrov pulled Galiyeva from the competition, citing a knee injury. Her replacement was teammate Tatiana Gutsu. Although Gutsu had fallen from the balance beam in the team finals, she was renowned for her extreme difficulty and the reigning European all-around champion and a Worlds medalist on bars and beam. It was later revealed that Galiyeva's injury was non-existent, and that the substitution was made because Gutsu was considered to have better medal-winning potential. Indeed, Gutsu emerged from the Olympic all-around as the gold medalist. While Gutsu split her prize money with Galiyeva, Galiyeva always remained angry about this turn of events.

After the 1992 Olympics, Galiyeva competed for Uzbekistan.

=== For Russia ===
After receiving Russian citizenship in 1995, Galiyeva began competing for the Russian team. Her first major meet for Russia was the European Championships in 1996 where she won gold on balance beam, beating such renowned gymnasts as Gina Gogean and former teammate Svetlana Boguinskaya, who was now competing for Belarus.

As the only returning Olympian, Galiyeva was named team captain of the Russian squad at the 1996 Olympic Games in Atlanta. However, these Olympics would also prove to be less than positive for her. The Russian squad was disappointed in the team finals, where they finished second to the United States after leading for the first half of the competition. Individually, Galiyeva finished in the top 10 (7th) in the all-around competition, fulfilling her goal to compete, but again she was disappointed. A balance beam medal seemed easily in her reach in event finals (her team optionals and all-around beam scores would have been enough to tie her for first and second respectively). However, although she started confidently and at first looked to be a contender for the gold, she fell on a front somersault near the end of her routine and finished in 7th place on that event. She had also earned a slot in the event finals for vault, but finished just shy of a medal there, in 4th.

After Atlanta, Galiyeva participated in exhibition tours and competitions in the United States. Her last major competition was the World University Games in 1997.

=== Post-competitive career ===
After retiring from competition, Galiyeva performed in an ice skating show, Moscow Circus on Ice, and judged gymnastics competitions in Russia.

== Competitive history ==
Year	Event	Team	AA	VT	UB	BB	FX
1991
1991	World Championships	1st					
1992	European Championships		12th				
1992	World Championships						
1992	Olympic Games	1st					
1993
1993	World Championships		6th				
1996	European Championships	2nd				1st	5th
1996	World Championships						8th
1996	Olympic Games	2nd	7th	4th		7th	

- Competitor for Russia

Year	Competition description	Location	Apparatus	Rank-Final	Score-Final	Rank-Qualifying	Score-Qualifying
1996	Olympic Games	Atlanta	Team	2	388.404		
1996	Olympic Games	Atlanta	All-around	7	38.905	8	77.723
1996	Olympic Games	Atlanta	Vault	4	9.743	5	19.512
1996	Olympic Games	Atlanta	Uneven bars			12	19.512
1996	Olympic Games	Atlanta	Balance beam	7	9.112	5	19.462
1996	Olympic Games	Atlanta	Floor exercise			29	19.237
1996	World Championships	San Juan	Vault (Semi−final)			11	9.506
1996	World Championships	San Juan	Vault (Qualification)			1	9.687
1996	World Championships	San Juan	Balance beam (Semi−final)			10	9.462
1996	World Championships	San Juan	Balance beam (Qualification)			8	9.762
1996	World Championships	San Juan	Floor exercise	8	9.637		
1996	World Championships	San Juan	Floor exercise (Semi−final)			4	9.762
1996	World Championships	San Juan	Floor exercise (Qualification)			6	9.725
1996	European Championships	Birmingham	Team	2	115.659		
1996	European Championships	Birmingham	All-around			10	38.261
1996	European Championships	Birmingham	Vault			55	9.150
1996	European Championships	Birmingham	Uneven bars			9	9.712
1996	European Championships	Birmingham	Balance beam	1	9.725	3	9.687
1996	European Championships	Birmingham	Floor exercise	5	9.762	5	9.712

- Competitor for Uzbekistan

Year	Competition description	Location	Apparatus	Rank-Final	Score-Final	Rank-Qualifying	Score-Qualifying
1993	World Championships	Birmingham	All-around	6	38.586	18	37.798
1993	World Championships	Birmingham	Vault			32	9.534
1993	World Championships	Birmingham	Uneven bars			15	9.487
1993	World Championships	Birmingham	Balance beam			32	9.212
1993	World Championships	Birmingham	Floor exercise			15	9.475

- Competitor for CIS

Year	Competition description	Location	Apparatus	Rank-Final	Score-Final	Rank-Qualifying	Score-Qualifying
1992	Olympic Games	Barcelona	Team	1	395.666		
1992	Olympic Games	Barcelona	All-around	WD		8	78.885
1992	Olympic Games	Barcelona	Vault			20	19.699
1992	Olympic Games	Barcelona	Uneven bars			14	19.750
1992	Olympic Games	Barcelona	Balance beam			11	19.662
1992	Olympic Games	Barcelona	Floor exercise			10	19.774
1992	World Championships	Paris	Uneven bars (Semi−final)			WD	
1992	World Championships	Paris	Uneven bars (Qualification)			2	9.912
1992	World Championships	Paris	Balance beam (Semi−final)			WD	
1992	World Championships	Paris	Balance beam (Qualification)			3	9.850
1992	World Championships	Paris	Floor exercise (Semi−final)			WD	
1992	World Championships	Paris	Floor exercise (Qualification)			4	9.887

- Competitor for Soviet Union

Year	Competition description	Location	Apparatus	Rank-Final	Score-Final	Rank-Qualifying	Score-Qualifying
1991	World Championships	Indianapolis	Team	1	396.055		
1991	World Championships	Indianapolis	All-around			9	78.949
1991	World Championships	Indianapolis	Vault			10	19.737
1991	World Championships	Indianapolis	Uneven bars			6	19.800
1991	World Championships	Indianapolis	Balance beam			11	19.650
1991	World Championships	Indianapolis	Floor exercise			9	19.762

== Major results ==
- 1997 World University Games: 1st team; 2nd BB
- 1996 Olympic Games: 2nd team; 7th AA; 4th VT; 7th BB
- 1996 World Championships: 6th FX
- 1996 European Championships: 1st BB; 2nd team; 5th VT
- 1995 Olympic Test Event: 1st FX; 2nd AA; 2nd UB; 6th VT
- 1993 World Championships: 6th AA
- 1992 Olympic Games: 1st team
- 1992 World Championships: 2nd UB; 3rd BB; 4th FX (all prelims)
- 1992 Moscow World Stars: 1st BB; 2nd FX; 4th AA
- 1991 World Championships: 1st team
- 1991 Moscow World Stars: 5th AA; 8th UB
- 1991 USSR Nationals: 4th AA

== See also ==
- List of Olympic female gymnasts for Russia
- Nationality changes in gymnastics
