= Giordana Rocchi =

Italian artistic gymnast

- Born: 28 September 1980 (age 45)

Gymnastics career
- Discipline: Women's artistic gymnastics
- Country represented: Italy
Medal record
Representing Italy
Mediterranean Games
Silver medal – second place	1997 Bari	Team

Giordana Rocchi (born September 28, 1980) is an Italian former artistic gymnast, born in Rome. She competed at the 1996 Summer Olympics, where she reached the all-around final and finished 33rd. She also won a silver medal with the Italian team at the 1997 Mediterranean Games.
