= Elvire Teza =

French gymnast

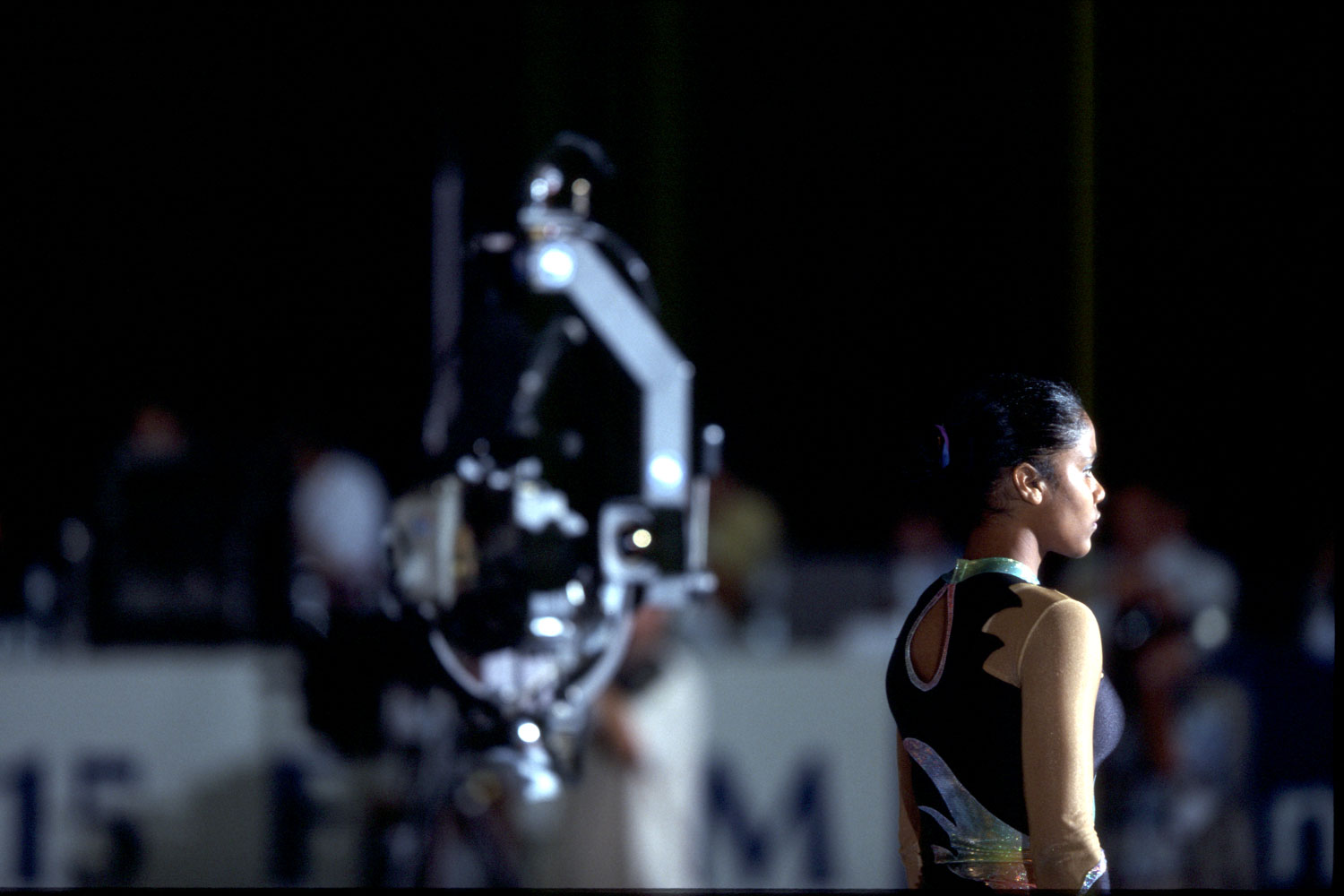

Personal information
- Born: March 29, 1981 (age 45) La Réunion

Gymnastics career
- Discipline: Women's artistic gymnastics
- Country represented: France
Medal record
Representing France
Mediterranean Games
Gold medal – first place	1997 Bari	Team
Gold medal – first place	1997 Bari	Uneven bars
Gold medal – first place	1997 Bari	Balance beam
Bronze medal – third place	1997 Bari	All-around
Junior European Championships
Gold medal – first place	1996 Birmingham	Uneven bars
Silver medal – second place	1996 Birmingham	Team
Silver medal – second place	1996 Birmingham	Balance beam
Bronze medal – third place	1994 Stockholm	Balance beam

Elvire Teza (born March 29, 1981) is a retired French gymnast who competed at the 1996 and 2000 Olympics. She was the French National Champion in gymnastics in 1997, 1999 and 2000.

== Career ==
Born on the island of Reunion, Teza trained in Marseille under coaches Shi Mao, Lin Xuan and Ma Jun. She made her international debut at the age of thirteen at the Junior European Championships, where she won bronze medals on the balance beam and floor exercise. At the 1996 Junior Europeans, she improved on these results, winning a gold medal on the uneven bars and silver medals with the French team and the beam final.

In 1997, Teza became the first (and to date, the only) French gymnast to win the American Cup. She won the gold medal with the French team at the 1997 Mediterranean Games, in addition to winning gold on uneven bars and balance beam and bronze in the all-around.

Teza competed at three World Gymnastics Championships, in 1995, 1997 (where she placed 6th on balance beam in event finals) and 1999. She also represented France at the Olympics twice; at the 1996 Games in Atlanta and the 2000 Games in Sydney. In Sydney, Teza became the first French female gymnast ever to qualify for an Olympic event final, placing eighth on the uneven bars.

Teza's beam and bars routines typically combined artistry with extreme difficulty. On the balance beam (coincidentally, an event she was said to dislike) Teza developed two original skills: a full twisting Yurchenko loop to back hip circle and a sideways Yang Bo jump. Both elements are named after her in the Code of Points and are classified as high-difficulty skills ( both are E level skills under the code of points in 2000, 2004, 2008, 2012 and 2016 periods). On the uneven bars she performed intricate work with German giant swings rarely seen in competition and two of those moves are named after her as well, which are the German giant variations of Pak salto and Bail to Handstand, both are D level skills under the code of points since 2000. Teza's tumbling and vaulting were considered relatively weak compared to her other events, however, on floor exercise she was known for presenting routines with expressive choreography and excellent dance elements.

Teza retired after the 2000 Olympics to pursue her education.

== Eponymous skills ==
Teza has three eponymous skills listed in the Code of Points.

Apparatus	Name	Description	Difficulty (Note: Valid for the 2025–2028 Code of Points)
Uneven bars	Teza	Circle swing to straight salto backwards between bars	E (0.5)
Balance beam	Teza	Yang Bo (split jump with arched back and head back) from side stand	D (0.4)
Balance beam	Teza	Back handspring from side stand with full twist to back hip circle	E (0.5)

== Competitive history ==
Year	Event	Team	AA	VT	UB	BB	FX
Junior
1994
1994	Junior European Championships		6	7		3rd place, bronze medalist(s)	6
Senior
1995	China Cup		6				
1995	French Championships		4				
1995	French International		5		4		6
1995	Massilia Cup				2nd place, silver medalist(s)	2nd place, silver medalist(s)	
1995	Pre-Olympics		9				
1995	World Championships	6	18				
1996	French International		2nd place, silver medalist(s)				
1996	World Championships				4		
1996	European Championships		4		1st place, gold medalist(s)	2nd place, silver medalist(s)	
1996	Massilia Cup		10				
1996	Olympic Games	8	16				
1997	Visa American Cup		1st place, gold medalist(s)				
1997	French Championships		1st place, gold medalist(s)				
1997	Massilia Cup			6	4	2nd place, silver medalist(s)	
1997	Mediterranean Games	1st place, gold medalist(s)	3rd place, bronze medalist(s)		1st place, gold medalist(s)	1st place, gold medalist(s)	6
1997	World Championships	5	19		6		
1998	Visa American Cup		7				
1998	China Cup		7	6	2nd place, silver medalist(s)		7
1998	European Championships		7		8	8	
1998	FRA-UKR-ESP Tri-Meet		1st place, gold medalist(s)				
1998	French International		3rd place, bronze medalist(s)		3rd place, bronze medalist(s)	2nd place, silver medalist(s)	
1998	3-on-3 International	3rd place, bronze medalist(s)					
1999	Coupe Nationales		5				
1999	ESP-FRA Dual Meet		5				
1999	FRA-AUS Dual Meet		2nd place, silver medalist(s)				
1999	French Championships		2nd place, silver medalist(s)				
1999	French International		9				
1999	Massilia Cup		9				
1999	Pre-Olympics		16				
2000	Coupe Nationales		1st place, gold medalist(s)				
2000	FRA-GBR-CAN-GER Quad-Meet		1st place, gold medalist(s)				
2000	Gymnastics Challenge		4				
2000	Zenith Tournament				5		
2000	Olympic Games		8		8		

== Sources ==
- Teza(Skill on beam)
- Biography and list of competitive results at the French Gymnastics Federation website (in French)
- ABC-TV broadcast of the 1997 World Gymnastics Championships, 1997
- Animation of teza performing her signature skill on beam
- Animation of Teza performing a German giant on the uneven bars
