= Viktoria Karpenko =

Ukrainian gymnast (born 1981)

- Full name: Viktoria Karpenko
- Nickname: Vika
- Born: March 15, 1981 (age 45) Kherson, Ukrainian SSR, Soviet Union

Gymnastics career
- Discipline: Women's artistic gymnastics
- Country represented: Bulgaria; (1995-2000)
- Former countries represented: Ukraine
- Club: Kherson Dynamo
- Gym: Koncha-Zaspa, Kyiv, Ukraine
- Former coach: Oleh Ostapenko
- Music: 1999-2000: The Saint by Orbital
- Eponymous skills: Invert giant, full pirouette to ellgrip (uneven bars), clear hip circle, half turn to ellgrip (uneven bars)
- Retired: 2008
Medal record
World Championships
Silver medal – second place	1999 Tianjin	All-around
Bronze medal – third place	1999 Tianjin	Team
European Championships
Silver medal – second place	1998 St. Petersburg	Uneven bars
Silver medal – second place	2000 Paris	Team
Silver medal – second place	2000 Paris	Uneven bars
Silver medal – second place	2000 Paris	Floor exercise
Bronze medal – third place	1998 St. Petersburg	Team
Bronze medal – third place	2000 Paris	All-around
European Team Championships
Bronze medal – third place	1997 Paris	Team
Summer Universiade
Silver medal – second place	1999 Mallorca	Team
Bronze medal – third place	1999 Mallorca	Uneven bars
Junior European Championships
Gold medal – first place	1996 Birmingham	Floor exercise
Bronze medal – third place	1996 Birmingham	Team
Bronze medal – third place	1996 Birmingham	All-around

Viktoria Karpenko (Ukrainian: Вікторія Карпенко, born on March 15, 1981, in Kherson, Ukrainian SSR) is a World Championships silver medalist and 2000 Olympian in artistic gymnastics. She began gymnastics at the age of four and went on to become the Ukrainian National Champion in 1996.

== Career ==
Karpenko made her world debut at the 1995 World Championships in Sabae, Japan with strong performances; however, she was overshadowed by veteran gymnasts and did not medal. Shortly after, she injured her hamstring and was unable to compete in the 1996 Olympic Games. The following year, she broke a finger during training and was forced to watch the 1997 World Championships from the stands.

In March 1998, she surprised coaches by winning the American Cup against U.S. hopefuls Vanessa Atler and Kristen Maloney. In April she placed second in the uneven bars final behind five-time world uneven bars champion Svetlana Khorkina at the European Championships. At the 1999 World Championships, Karpenko performed with ease and placed second in the all-around competition.

Things were looking great for Karpenko in early 2000, as she won preliminaries at the European Championships in Paris. Ending up third in the all-around, she also grabbed a silver on the uneven bars, and tied for another second-place finish on floor exercise in event finals. Despite these accomplishments, Karpenko is known for her performance at the 2000 Olympic Games, where she did not earn a medal. A favorite for the all-around title, Karpenko was in first place going into the final rotation. As she finished her first pass on floor, she stubbed her toe, tripped, and fell out of bounds. She subsequently received a score of 8.725 and dropped to 12th place.

Karpenko moved to Bulgaria in June 2002, where the country's Artistic Gymnastics Federation covered the costs for the treatment of her injury, and had two short-lived comebacks in both 2003 and 2006, competing for Bulgaria. Marred by injury, she never retained her form or individual results. Her final competition was at the 2007 European Championships, where she placed 18th in the all-around.

In March 2012, China forfeited the 1999 World Championship team bronze medals to Ukraine, who placed fourth. It was discovered in 2008 that China falsified the age of team member Dong Fangxiao, therefore nullifying her results from this competition as well as the 2000 Olympics. Karpenko and her teammates received the bronze medal.

== Competitive history ==
Year	Event	Team	AA	VT	UB	BB	FX
Representing Ukraine
1995	International Junior Championships		6	3rd place, bronze medalist(s)	1st place, gold medalist(s)	3rd place, bronze medalist(s)	
1995	World Championships	5					
1996	Bluewater International		1st place, gold medalist(s)				
1996	European Championships		3rd place, bronze medalist(s)		4	4	1st place, gold medalist(s)
1996	Kiev International		1st place, gold medalist(s)				
1996	Trophee Massilia		3rd place, bronze medalist(s)				
1996	Ukraine Cup		2nd place, silver medalist(s)				
1996	Wild Rose Invitational		1st place, gold medalist(s)				
1997	Chunichi Cup		1st place, gold medalist(s)	2nd place, silver medalist(s)	2nd place, silver medalist(s)	3rd place, bronze medalist(s)	2nd place, silver medalist(s)
1997	Gander Memorial		4				
1997	Hungarian International		1st place, gold medalist(s)				
1997	Ukrainian Championships		3rd place, bronze medalist(s)		1st place, gold medalist(s)	1st place, gold medalist(s)	
1998	Visa American Cup		1st place, gold medalist(s)				
1998	Chunichi Cup		1st place, gold medalist(s)	2nd place, silver medalist(s)	2nd place, silver medalist(s)	5	1st place, gold medalist(s)
1998	Copa Gimnastica	2nd place, silver medalist(s)	1st place, gold medalist(s)	3rd place, bronze medalist(s)	1st place, gold medalist(s)		2nd place, silver medalist(s)
1998	European Championships		4		3rd place, bronze medalist(s)		
1998	FRA-UKR-ESP Tri-Meet	1st place, gold medalist(s)	2nd place, silver medalist(s)				
1998	French International		6				
1998	3-on-3 International	1st place, gold medalist(s)					
1998	Ukrainian Championships		1st place, gold medalist(s)				
1999	Visa American Cup		4				
1999	DTB Cup				2nd place, silver medalist(s)	1st place, gold medalist(s)	1st place, gold medalist(s)
1999	French International		8		3rd place, bronze medalist(s)		
1999	Gander Memorial		5				
1999	Glasgow Grand Prix			8	3rd place, bronze medalist(s)	2nd place, silver medalist(s)	
1999	Samboo International				7	5	7
1999	3-on-3 International	1st place, gold medalist(s)					
1999	UKR Cup		2nd place, silver medalist(s)				
1999	Ukrainian Championships		1st place, gold medalist(s)				
1999	Summer Universiade	2nd place, silver medalist(s)	5		3rd place, bronze medalist(s)		
1999	Zurich Grand Prix				1st place, gold medalist(s)	1st place, gold medalist(s)	9
1999	World Championships	3rd place, bronze medalist(s)	2nd place, silver medalist(s)	7	5		
2000	Cottbus Cup			5	1st place, gold medalist(s)	3rd place, bronze medalist(s)	6
2000	DTB Cup			3rd place, bronze medalist(s)		3rd place, bronze medalist(s)	5
2000	European Championships	2nd place, silver medalist(s)	3rd place, bronze medalist(s)	5	2nd place, silver medalist(s)	4	2nd place, silver medalist(s)
2000	Swiss Cup	2nd place, silver medalist(s)					
2000	World Cup Final			7		4	5
2000	Olympic Games	6	11		4		
Representing Bulgaria
2003	Bulgarian Championships		2nd place, silver medalist(s)				
2003	BUL Cup		1st place, gold medalist(s)				
2003	Gander Memorial		10				
2003	GRE-BUL-HUN Tri-Meet		3rd place, bronze medalist(s)				
2003	Siska International		3rd place, bronze medalist(s)		2nd place, silver medalist(s)		
2003	Varna International		3rd place, bronze medalist(s)				
2003	World Championships	19					
2007
2007	European Championships		18				

== See also ==
- List of Olympic female gymnasts for Ukraine
- Nationality changes in gymnastics
