= Anna Mirgorodskaya =

Ukrainian artistic gymnast (born 1980)

- Born: 13 March 1980 (age 46) Odesa, Ukrainian SSR, Soviet Union

Gymnastics career
- Discipline: Women's artistic gymnastics
- Country represented: Ukraine
- Retired: 1997
Medal record
Representing Ukraine
European Championships
Bronze medal – third place	1996 Birmingham	Team

Anna Mirgorodskaya (Ukrainian: Га́нна Микола́ївна Миргоро́дська, romanized: Hanna Mykolaivna Myrhorodska; born 13 March 1980) is a former Ukrainian artistic gymnast. She competed at the 1995 World Artistic Gymnastics Championships, the 1996 European Women's Artistic Gymnastics Championships and the 1996 Summer Olympics.

== Eponymous skill ==
Mirgorodskaya has one eponymous skill listed in the Code of Points.

Apparatus	Name	Description	Difficulty (Note: Valid for the 2025–2028 Code of Points)
Uneven bars	Mirgoradskaja	Clear rear pike support on high bar (legs together) – full circle swing backward – continuing through clear rear pike support backward over high bar into hang	D (0.4)

== See also ==
- List of Olympic female gymnasts for Ukraine
