= Dina Kochetkova =

Russian gymnast (born 1977)

- Born: 27 July 1977 (age 49) Moscow, Russian SFSR, Soviet Union (now Russia)

Gymnastics career
- Discipline: Women's artistic gymnastics
- Country represented: Russia
- Eponymous skills: Balance Beam
- Retired: 1996
Medal record
Event	1st	2nd	3rd
Olympic Games	0	1	0
World Championships	2	0	3
European Championships	0	3	2
Representing Russia
Olympic Games
Silver medal – second place	1996 Atlanta	Team
World Championships
Gold medal – first place	1994 Brisbane	Floor Exercise
Gold medal – first place	1996 Puerto Rico	Balance Beam
Bronze medal – third place	1994 Dortmund	Team
Bronze medal – third place	1994 Brisbane	All-Around
Bronze medal – third place	1994 Brisbane	Uneven Bars
Goodwill Games
Gold medal – first place	1994 St Petersburg	Team
Gold medal – first place	1994 St Petersburg	All-Around
Silver medal – second place	1994 St Petersburg	Floor Exercise
European Championships
Silver medal – second place	1994 Stockholm	Team
Silver medal – second place	1994 Stockholm	All-Around
Silver medal – second place	1996 Birmingham	Team
Bronze medal – third place	1994 Stockholm	Floor Exercise
Bronze medal – third place	1996 Birmingham	Floor Exercise

Dina Anatolyevna Kochetkova (Russian: Дина Анатольевна Кочеткова, born 27 July 1977 in Moscow, Russian SFSR) is a Russian gymnast who competed at the 1996 Olympics. An element she pioneered, a full-twisting back handspring on beam, remains in the Code of Points as "the Kochetkova".

== Career ==
Kochetkova was a member of the Soviet national team from the early 1990s. She won four medals at the 1991 Junior European Championships, placing second on the floor exercise and third in the all-around, vault and balance beam. As a senior, she competed for the Russian Federation at multiple international meets including the 1992 European Championships.

1994 was Kochetkova's breakthrough year. She won the Russian National Championships, the Goodwill Games all-around, and three individual medals at the World Gymnastics Championships in Brisbane: bronze in the all-around, behind Shannon Miller and Lavinia Miloșovici, gold on the floor exercise and another bronze on the uneven bars. Her rise escalated when she ended the two-year winning streak of Shannon Miller in AA competition by defeating her for the AA title at the 1994 Goodwill Games in Saint Petersburgh. Kochetkova won three more medals (silver AA and team; bronze FX) at the European Championships and shared in the team bronze medal at the World Team Championships in Dortmund. However, by the Team World Championships she was suddenly finding herself outshone by rising teammate Svetlana Khorkina, who was placed after Kochetkova in the lineup on every event in Team Finals.

At the 1995 World Championships, Kochetkova and the Russian team finished off the podium in the team competition; while Kochetkova qualified for the all-around and two event finals, subpar performances and a low vault score kept her out of medal contention. At the 1996 World Championships she rallied with a high balance beam score of 9.887 to win the event; and at the 1996 Europeans she earned a bronze on floor.

Kochetkova was a member of the Russian team for the 1996 Olympics in Atlanta, and was considered a medal contender for multiple individual events. Kochetkova, as one of the most experienced Russian team members, showed strong performances in the team competition, qualifying in third place to the individual all-around. In the all-around final, she was tied for the lead going into the last rotation. However, she ended on vault, her weakest apparatus. In an attempt to get the highest score possible, she attempted a difficult 1 1/2 twisting Yurchenko vault (a 10.0 start value vault), instead of her usual simpler 9.9 start value vault, but faultered on the harder skill. Her low vault score dropped her to sixth place for the individual competition. This was the highest placing out of the Russians, but still shy of a medal. In the event finals, Dina finished fourth on the balance beam and fifth on uneven parallel bars and floor exercise. The Olympics were her last major competition.

== Later life ==
Kochetkova underwent knee surgery in 1997 after her retirement. She lives in Moscow with her husband, working as a personal trainer.

== Eponymous skill ==
Kochetkova has one eponymous skill listed in the Code of Points.

Apparatus	Name	Description	Difficulty (Note: Valid for the 2025–2028 Code of Points)
Balance beam	Kochetkova	Flic-flac with minimum 3/4 turn (270°) before hand support	D (0.4)

== Competitive history ==
Year	Event	Team	AA	VT	UB	BB	FX
Junior
1991	Blume Memorial	1st place, gold medalist(s)	7				
1991	GER-USSR Dual Meet	1st place, gold medalist(s)	5				
1991	International Junior Championships		2nd place, silver medalist(s)	2nd place, silver medalist(s)	1st place, gold medalist(s)	1st place, gold medalist(s)	4
1991	European Championships		3rd place, bronze medalist(s)	3rd place, bronze medalist(s)		3rd place, bronze medalist(s)	2nd place, silver medalist(s)
Senior
1992	CIS Championships		11		3rd place, bronze medalist(s)		5
1992	CIS Cup		11				
1992	European Championships		12				
1992	European Team Championships	1st place, gold medalist(s)					
1992	World Stars		9		2nd place, silver medalist(s)	4	
1993	Chunichi Cup		8				
1993	Medico Cup		2nd place, silver medalist(s)	1st place, gold medalist(s)	2nd place, silver medalist(s)		1st place, gold medalist(s)
1993	Russian Championships		3rd place, bronze medalist(s)	3rd place, bronze medalist(s)	3rd place, bronze medalist(s)		1st place, gold medalist(s)
1993	Russian Cup		2nd place, silver medalist(s)				
1993	RUS-ROM-ITA Tri-Meet		1st place, gold medalist(s)				
1993	Tokyo Cup				4	3rd place, bronze medalist(s)	4
1993	World Stars		2nd place, silver medalist(s)	8			
1994	Blume Memorial		2nd place, silver medalist(s)				
1994	Chunichi Cup		4	5	3rd place, bronze medalist(s)	4	5
1994	European Championships	2nd place, silver medalist(s)	2nd place, silver medalist(s)				3rd place, bronze medalist(s)
1994	Fukuoka Cup				4	4	
1994	Goodwill Games	1st place, gold medalist(s)	1st place, gold medalist(s)				
1994	Russian Championships	1st place, gold medalist(s)	1st place, gold medalist(s)				
1994	Trophee Massilia		24				
1994	World Championships		3rd place, bronze medalist(s)	6	3rd place, bronze medalist(s)		1st place, gold medalist(s)
1994	World Team Championships	3rd place, bronze medalist(s)					
1994	World Stars		2nd place, silver medalist(s)	1st place, gold medalist(s)	1st place, gold medalist(s)		5
1995	Cottbus Grand Prix			4		2nd place, silver medalist(s)	7
1995	DTB Cup				5	4	
1995	European Cup		9		6		2nd place, silver medalist(s)
1995	French International		4	6			5
1995	Russian Championships		3rd place, bronze medalist(s)	4	8	7	1st place, gold medalist(s)
1995	World Championships	4	8		6	6	
1995	World Stars		2nd place, silver medalist(s)	2nd place, silver medalist(s)	2nd place, silver medalist(s)	2nd place, silver medalist(s)	3rd place, bronze medalist(s)
1996	Cottbus Grand Prix			1st place, gold medalist(s)	3rd place, bronze medalist(s)	1st place, gold medalist(s)	2nd place, silver medalist(s)
1996	European Championships	2nd place, silver medalist(s)	5	4	8	7	3rd place, bronze medalist(s)
1996	French International				3rd place, bronze medalist(s)		3rd place, bronze medalist(s)
1996	World Championships					1st place, gold medalist(s)	
1996	Rome Grand Prix		2nd place, silver medalist(s)	2nd place, silver medalist(s)	2nd place, silver medalist(s)	2nd place, silver medalist(s)	2nd place, silver medalist(s)
1996	Russian Championships		7				
1996	World Stars		2nd place, silver medalist(s)	2nd place, silver medalist(s)	1st place, gold medalist(s)	1st place, gold medalist(s)	
1996	Olympic Games	2nd place, silver medalist(s)	6		5	4	5

== See also ==
- List of Olympic female artistic gymnasts for Russia
