= Yvonne Pioch =

German artistic gymnast

- Full name: Yvonne Pioch
- Born: 15 March 1980 (age 46) Neubrandenburg, Mecklenburg-Vorpommern, East Germany
- Height: 5 ft 2 in (157 cm)

Gymnastics career
- Discipline: Women's artistic gymnastics
- Country represented: Germany

Yvonne Pioch (born 15 March 1980) is a German former artistic gymnast. She competed at the 1996 Summer Olympics.
