= Isabelle Severino =

French gymnast and actress

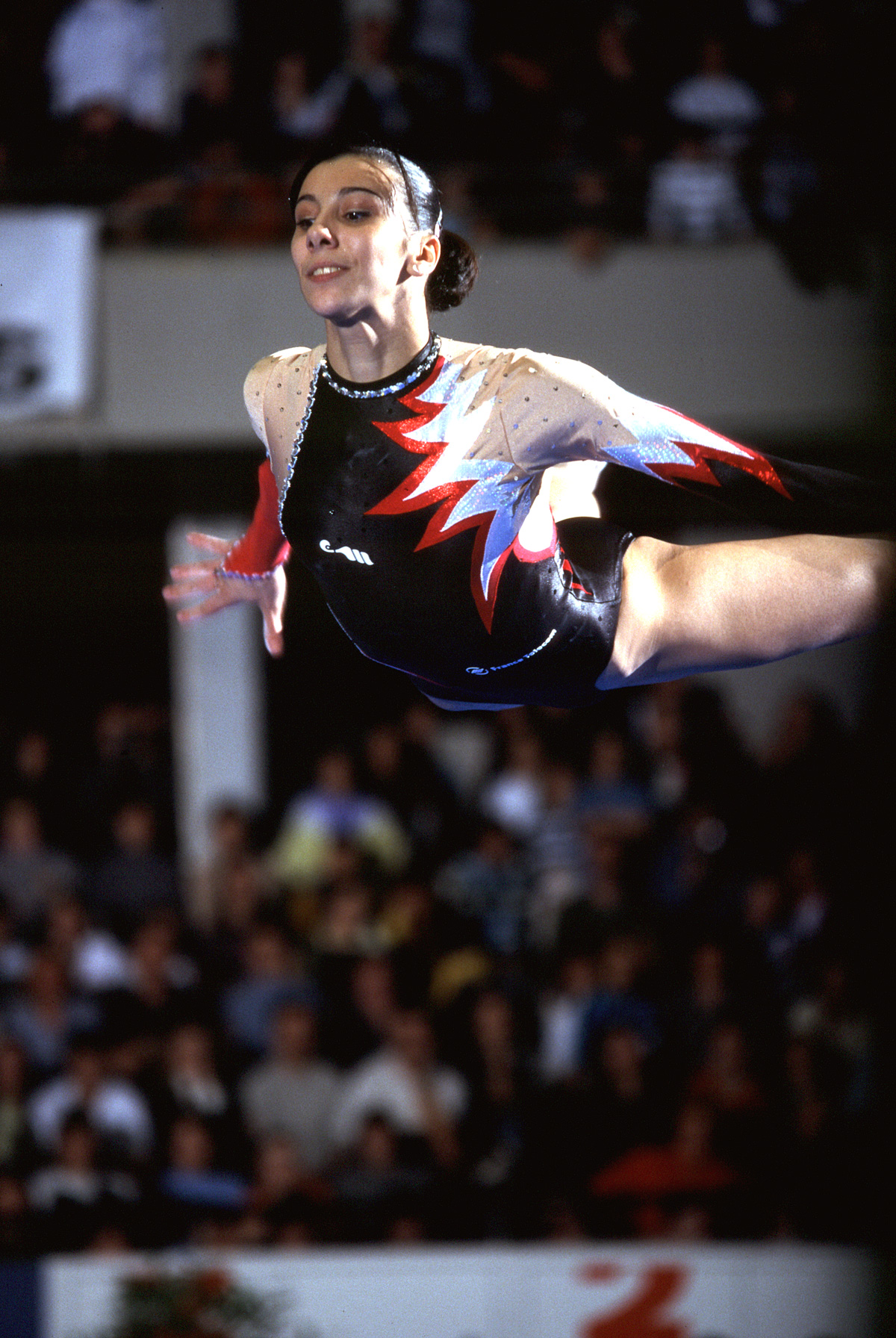

Personal information
- Born: 9 April 1980 (age 46)

Gymnastics career
- Discipline: Women's artistic gymnastics
- Country represented: France
Medal record
World Championships
Bronze medal – third place	1996 Puerto Rico	Uneven bars
European Championships
Gold medal – first place	2005 Debrecen	Floor exercise
Bronze medal – third place	2008 Clermont-Ferrand	Team

Isabelle Severino (born 9 April 1980) is a French gymnast and actress from Montmorency, Paris, France.

Severino was a member of the 1996 and 2004 French Olympic teams where the French team placed 8th and 6th respectively. Isabelle is also a veteran of several World Championships and European Championships, having won medals at both of these competitions and made several All Around and Event finals at both competitions. Isabelle won the bronze medal on the uneven bars at the 1996 World Championships in Puerto Rico with a score of 9.775. Isabelle won the gold medal at the 2005 European Gymnastics Championships in the floor finals with a score of 9.575 with an engaging routine with popular music. She also won the Junior European Bars title in 1994.

Severino retired from the sport between 1998 and 2004 Olympic Games, going on to perform in the Cirque du Soleil show La Nouba in 1999 and to work for a communications company. However, she came back to the sport and has continued to compete well, with her Cirque du Soleil experience having polished her performance qualities.

Severino appeared in the 2006 movie Stick It, where she was the gymnastics body double for lead actress Missy Peregrym, as well as having a cameo role outside her body double role in the film.
