= Mercedes Pacheco =

Spanish artistic gymnast

- Born: 29 May 1978; Madrid, Spain
- Occupation: former artistic gymnast

Mercedes Pacheco del Barrio (born 29 May 1978) is a Spanish former artistic gymnast. She competed at the 1996 Summer Olympics.
