= Gina Gogean =

Romanian artistic gymnast (born 1977)

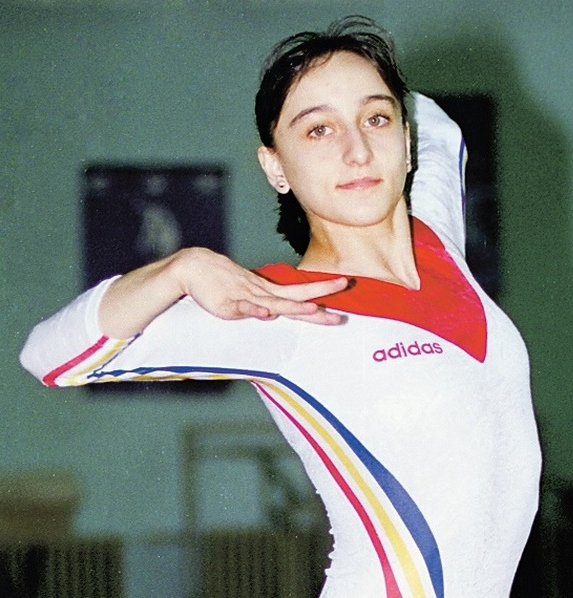
- Gogean in the early 1990s

Personal information
- Full name: Gina Gogean
- Born: 9 September 1977 (age 48) Câmpuri, Vrancea County, Socialist Republic of Romania
- Height: 150 cm (4 ft 11 in)

Gymnastics career
- Discipline: Women's artistic gymnastics
- Country represented: Romania (1989–1998 (ROM))
- Club: CSS Focșani
- Head coach: Octavian Bellu
- Assistant coaches: Mariana Bitang, Nicolae Forminte, Toma Ponoran
- Former coaches: Tatiana and Sergiu Popa
- Eponymous skills: Floor: Tour jeté with additional 1/1 turn (360°), landing on one or both feet
Medal record
Representing Romania
Olympic Games
Silver medal – second place	1992 Barcelona	Team
Silver medal – second place	1996 Atlanta	All-Around
Bronze medal – third place	1996 Atlanta	Team
Bronze medal – third place	1996 Atlanta	Balance Beam
Bronze medal – third place	1996 Atlanta	Vault
World Championships
Gold medal – first place	1994 Brisbane	Vault
Gold medal – first place	1994 Dortmund	Team
Gold medal – first place	1995 Sabae	Team
Gold medal – first place	1995 Sabae	Floor Exercise
Gold medal – first place	1996 San Juan	Floor Exercise
Gold medal – first place	1996 San Juan	Vault
Gold medal – first place	1997 Lausanne	Team
Gold medal – first place	1997 Lausanne	Balance Beam
Gold medal – first place	1997 Lausanne	Floor Exercise
Silver medal – second place	1993 Birmingham	All-Around
Silver medal – second place	1993 Birmingham	Floor Exercise
Bronze medal – third place	1993 Birmingham	Balance Beam
Bronze medal – third place	1994 Brisbane	Floor Exercise
Bronze medal – third place	1995 Sabae	Vault
Bronze medal – third place	1997 Lausanne	Vault
World Cup Final
Silver medal – second place	1998 Sabae	Vault
Silver medal – second place	1998 Sabae	Floor Exercise
Bronze medal – third place	1998 Sabae	Balance Beam
European Championships
Gold medal – first place	1992 Nantes	Floor Exercise
Gold medal – first place	1994 Stockholm	Team
Gold medal – first place	1994 Stockholm	All-Around
Gold medal – first place	1994 Stockholm	Balance Beam
Gold medal – first place	1996 Birmingham	Team
Silver medal – second place	1992 Nantes	All-Around
Silver medal – second place	1992 Nantes	Vault
Silver medal – second place	1996 Birmingham	Vault
Silver medal – second place	1996 Birmingham	Balance Beam
Bronze medal – third place	1994 Stockholm	Floor Exercise

Gina Elena Gogean (born 9 September 1977) is a Romanian former artistic gymnast who competed internationally in the late 1980s and throughout the 1990s. During her career she won an impressive number of 30 medals at Olympic Games, world championships or continental championships. Her best events were the floor exercise (three-time world champion), the vault (two-time world champion) and the balance beam (1997 world champion). She was also an excellent all around gymnast winning several medals on this event, the European title in 1994, a silver Olympic medal (1996) and a silver medal at the 1993 World Championships. She helped the Romanian team win three consecutive world titles (1994, 1995 and 1997) and two Olympic team medals, a silver and a bronze (1992 and 1996). Gogean was inducted into the International Gymnastics Hall of Fame in 2013. Criticized for her lack of artistry and expression, Gogean nonetheless had nearly unmatched consistency, longevity, and efficiency that made her a backbone of the Romanian team in the 1990s.

== Early life and career ==
Her passport listed her birth year as 1977. However, in 2002 the Romanian newspaper ProSport obtained hospital records indicating that she had actually been born in 1978. Gogean and her mother have denied this, and her official birth year is still listed as 1977 or "unknown" in many sources. Gogean initially trained at CSS Focșani, near her home village, under the tutelage of Sergiu and Tatiana Popa. She made her international debut at the Japan Junior International meet in 1989, where she placed fourth in the all-around and took the gold medal on floor exercise.

== Senior career ==
By 1990, Gogean was representing Romania at major meets such as the Goodwill Games. She began to make a name for herself at the 1992 European Championships where she won the floor exercise gold, and finished second all-around and vault. Crowds and analysts were impressed with the young athlete's exceptional difficulty. She was equally impressive at 1992 Summer Olympics in Barcelona, Spain. The youngest member of the experienced Romanian team, Gina put up some of the highest scores for her team throughout the compulsories and optionals. She won a team silver, finished 6th in the all-around, and was 5th on vault. Though her teammate and close friend Lavinia Miloșovici was one of the stars of the Olympics, Gina nonetheless had established herself as a gymnast to watch for in the future.

In a sport where athletes are constantly fighting the battle of time as well as their maturing bodies, Gina continued to be one of the top gymnasts in the world each year after the Olympics. She was criticized for her lack of artistry in her gymnastics (particularly her post-1992 routines), and her stoic demeanor. Nevertheless, each year her gymnastics continually showed improvement from the year prior and her results reflected that. She finished a close second in the all-around behind rival Shannon Miller at the 1993 World Championships, losing by only 0.007. She also took the silver on floor exercise and bronze on beam.

Though she did not medal in the all-around the following year (finishing 4th), she became the World Champion on vault - her first Worlds gold medal. She also won a bronze on floor. She also became the European All-Around champion that year, and played a critical role in helping the Romanian team win the 1994 Team World Championship—the country's first since 1987. Gina suffered a fall in the qualifying rounds of this competition while attempting a back handspring-layout-back handspring combination on beam. Her foot slipped off the side and the back of her head slammed into the beam before she crashed to the floor. Miraculously, she suffered no injury, and only took an extra moment to collect herself before jumping back up on the beam.

Though Gina struggled in major all-around competition through 1995 and 1996, her gymnastics continued to improve and she won more individual event World titles. At the 1995 World Championships, she helped the Romanians win their second team title, and went on to win the bronze on vault and the gold on floor. She added two more golds to her haul at the 1996 World Championships on vault and floor. At the European Championships a few weeks later, she won the team gold as well as silver on vault and beam. She was unable to defend the all around title after suffering a fall on uneven bars in the team final.

Going into the 1996 Summer Olympics, the Romanians were the favorites to win team gold. However, the Romanian team had several injuries and was under staffed during the team portion and had a very lackluster performance in both compulsories and optionals. The end result was a disappointing third. Gina, however, had a strong performance during the all-around and won the silver medal behind Lilia Podkopayeva of Ukraine. She also won two more bronze medals on the vault and beam.

Her performances in the 1996 Olympics were particularly impressive, as Gina underwent an emergency appendectomy only 5 weeks before the competition. At the time, she had been traveling on a train to Bucharest, which was the only city where hospitals could perform the kind of non-invasive surgery that Gina needed to return to training quickly. Traditional surgery would have involved at least a six-week wait to resume light training and she would have missed the Olympics.

Gogean continued to compete after the retirement of Lavinia Miloșovici. She admitted in an ABC News interview during the 1997 World Championships in Lausanne, Switzerland that the new Code of Points made gymnastics too difficult for her, and that she intended to retire after the competition was over; yet she led the Romanians to their third straight world team title. Gogean herself finished just off the podium in fourth. She rebounded by winning the world title on beam and her third straight title on floor. While she never won an Olympic gold, she finished her career with an impressive thirty Olympic, World, and European medals, fourteen of them gold.

=== Eponymous skill ===
Gogean has one eponymous skill listed in the Code of Points, although she is not credited in the Code of Points list of elements performed for the first time by gymnasts at FIG official competitions.

Apparatus	Name	Description	Difficulty
Floor exercise	Gogean	Tour jeté with additional 1/1 turn (360°), landing on one or both feet	D

== Retirement ==
Gogean retired after the 1998 World Cup, where she medalled in her all three events. After completing her studies she coached in Romania and later in Scotland, and also worked as a television commentator. Since 2001 she is a regular gymnastics judge.

In 2000 she was awarded the Cross of Faithful Service, 1st class by then-President of Romania Emil Constantinescu.

On 1 July 2006, she married Cristian Gorza, a former classmate of hers, in a ceremony in Deva, Romania. Her former coaches, Octavian Belu and Mariana Bitang, served as the godparents. Teammates Andreea Răducan and Maria Olaru were among the guests.

== See also ==
- List of Olympic female gymnasts for Romania
- List of top Olympic gymnastics medalists
- List of top medalists at the World Artistic Gymnastics Championships
