= Mónica Martín =

Spanish gymnast (born 1976)

- Born: 21 June 1976 (age 49); Gijón, Spain

Gymnastics career
- Discipline: Women's artistic gymnastics
- Country represented: Spain

Mónica Martín (born 21 June 1976) is a Spanish gymnast. She competed at the 1996 Summer Olympics, where she finished 17th in the individual all around final.
