= Nikolett Krausz =

Hungarian artistic gymnast

Nikolett Krausz (born 20 May 1981 in Budapest) is a Hungarian former artistic gymnast. She competed at the 1995 World Championships and the 1996 Summer Olympics.
