= Lavinia Miloșovici =

Romanian artistic gymnast (born 1976)

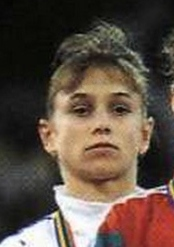
- Miloşovici at the 1992 Olympics

Personal information
- Full name: Lavinia Corina Miloșovici
- Nickname: Milo
- Born: 21 October 1976 (age 49) Lugoj, Romania

Gymnastics career
- Discipline: Women's artistic gymnastics
- Country represented: Romania; (1990–97 (ROU))
- Gym: Deva National Training Center
- Head coach: Octavian Bellu
- Assistant coach: Mariana Bitang
- Retired: 1997
Medal record
Women's artistic gymnastics
Representing Romania
| Event | 1st | 2nd | 3rd |
|---|---|---|---|
| Olympic Games | 2 | 1 | 3 |
| World Championships | 5 | 3 | 5 |
| European Championships | 4 | 1 | 2 |
| Total | 11 | 5 | 10 |
Olympic Games
| Gold medal – first place | 1992 Barcelona | Vault |
| Gold medal – first place | 1992 Barcelona | Floor exercise |
| Silver medal – second place | 1992 Barcelona | Team |
| Bronze medal – third place | 1992 Barcelona | All-around |
| Bronze medal – third place | 1996 Atlanta | Team |
| Bronze medal – third place | 1996 Atlanta | All-around |
World Championships
| Gold medal – first place | 1991 Indianapolis | Vault |
| Gold medal – first place | 1992 Paris | Uneven Bars |
| Gold medal – first place | 1993 Birmingham | Balance Beam |
| Gold medal – first place | 1994 Dortmund | Team |
| Gold medal – first place | 1995 Sabae | Team |
| Silver medal – second place | 1993 Birmingham | Vault |
| Silver medal – second place | 1994 Brisbane | All-Around |
| Silver medal – second place | 1994 Brisbane | Floor |
| Bronze medal – third place | 1991 Indianapolis | Team |
| Bronze medal – third place | 1991 Indianapolis | Balance Beam |
| Bronze medal – third place | 1994 Brisbane | Vault |
| Bronze medal – third place | 1995 Sabae | All-Around |
| Bronze medal – third place | 1996 San Juan | Floor |
European Championships
| Gold medal – first place | 1994 Stockholm | Team |
| Gold medal – first place | 1994 Stockholm | Vault |
| Gold medal – first place | 1996 Birmingham | Team |
| Gold medal – first place | 1996 Birmingham | Floor |
| Silver medal – second place | 1994 Stockholm | Floor |
| Bronze medal – third place | 1994 Stockholm | Balance Beam |
| Bronze medal – third place | 1996 Birmingham | All-Around |

Lavinia Corina Miloșovici (Serbian Cyrillic: Лавинија Милошевић; born 21 October 1976) is a retired Romanian artistic gymnast. Also known as "Milo" in the gymnastics community, Miloșovici is considered to be one of Romania's top gymnasts and one of the most prolific female all-around medalists ever, earning a total 19 World Championships or Olympic medals in a span of six years. She medalled in every single World Championships meet, Olympic Games and European Championships between 1991 and 1996, and is only the third female gymnast ever, after Larisa Latynina and Věra Čáslavská, to win at least one World Championships or Olympic title on all four events. Miloșovici was also the last gymnast, along with Lu Li, to ever receive the perfect mark of 10.0 in an Olympic competition and the last to receive the benchmark score of 9.95 at the World Championships. She was inducted into the International Gymnastics Hall of Fame in 2011.

== Early life and career ==
Miloșovici was born into a family with Serbian roots. Her mother, Ildiko, was a competitive volleyball player, while her father, Tănase, was a national team wrestler. She began gymnastics at the age of six and moved to the Deva National Training Centre as she excelled in the sport.

Miloșovici's gymnastics career was nearly derailed when she contracted scarlet fever at the age of 10, and again when the Romanian Revolution in 1989 temporarily closed Deva. However, she continued to train, and by 1990 she was representing Romania in international meets such as the American Cup and the World Sports Fair. She competed at the 1991 Junior European Championships, winning two gold medals.

== Senior career ==
Miloșovici made her debut as a senior in 1991, winning her first all-around title at the Romanian National Championships. She joined the Romanian team at the 1991 World Championships, where she contributed to the team's bronze medal, won her first individual World Championships title on the vault, and placed third on the balance beam.

Miloșovici won her second individual world title on uneven bars at the 1992 World Championships. At the 1992 Olympics in Barcelona, Miloșovici won a total of four medals. She placed third in the all-around and second with the Romanian team. She was very close to winning the all-around, being tied for 1st with eventual winner Tatiana Gutsu after three rotations, but a big hop on her beam dismount to start the night (9.850) and a small hop on her uneven bars dismount in the final rotation (9.900) cost her the victory. In the event finals, she tied with Hungarian Henrietta Ónodi for the vault gold medal and won floor exercise with a perfect score of 10.0. She scored her 10.0 on the floor exercise the same night that China's Lu Li scored a 10.0 on the uneven bars. Miloșovici's 10.0 in the event finals was only the second awarded in Barcelona, and the last ever awarded at any Olympics. She was the only gymnast at those Games to win two individual golds, and was the most successful overall gymnast of that Games, leaving with four total medals.

After the 1992 Olympics, Miloșovici continued to compete. In the 1993 European Cup, she finished third in the all-around, won gold on both vault and uneven bars, and silver on floor. At the World Championships, she made all four apparatus finals and she won the gold on beam. She also won the silver medal on vault, but finished eighth in the all-around after a fall on beam.

In 1994 and 1995, she led the Romanian team to two World Championships team titles. Shortly before the 1994 World Championships, she and her teammates staged a strike at Deva to protest non-payment of prize money owed from the Romanian Gymnastics Federation. In spite of the depleted training time, they still won the team gold medal at Worlds. Miloșovici's best all-around finish in a World Championship or Olympic competition came in 1994, when she took second to Shannon Miller (losing by a margin of 0.038), after being the early favourite as the top qualifier to the all-around final. A step on dismount of her uneven bars routine and a minor wobble in the side somersault on beam cost her the win. Miloșovici once again made all four apparatus finals, and concluded the 1994 Worlds with a silver on floor and a bronze on vault. She lost the floor gold by 0.013 to Dina Kochetkova. At the European Championships, a fall off the uneven bars on the dismount kept her off the all-around podium, but she rebounded to win a gold on vault, silver on floor, and bronze on beam in the individual event finals.

She delivered a dominant performance at the 1994 Team Worlds, where she easily won the individual all-around points tally with 39.500 points, an average score of 9.875 over the four events, and led Romania to an emphatic victory. She also received the highest score of the quadrennium at this meet with a 9.950 on the floor exercise.

At the 1995 Sabae World Championships, she captured the all-around bronze. She was in tears after the competition, as she realized this was likely her last realistic shot at a major all-around title. At this point she was affected by growth spurt, and overshadowed by younger teammates Gina Gogean and Simona Amânar. The only event final she qualified for due to the two-gymnasts-per-country rule was the uneven bars, despite being the fourth highest qualifier on floor (Amânar and Gogean were the top two qualifiers).

Miloșovici won the bronze medal on floor at the 1996 World Championships, before winning the team and floor gold medals at the European Championships. She also finished third in the all around. Miloșovici led the Romanian team to a bronze at the 1996 Olympics, in spite of a spate of injuries that left the squad depleted of several key gymnasts and forced them to compete with only six athletes instead of seven. Milosovici had the rare opportunity to improve upon her third place all around finish in Barcelona; with her consistency and competitors' mistakes, she was tied for the bronze with Amanar, and became the first gymnast since Nadia Comăneci to medal in the all around at consecutive Olympics. This also marked her fourth all-around medal in World and Olympic competition, a feat since equalled only by Svetlana Khorkina, Aliya Mustafina and Simone Biles. Interestingly, whilst Milosovici won the all around bronze medal at the 1995 Worlds, 1996 European and 1996 Olympics, Lilia Pokdopayeva was the gold medalist in all three finals. In her last competition, Milosovici finished eighth in the uneven bars final. She originally qualified for the beam final, but was replaced by her teammate Alexandra Marinescu.

Overall, Miloșovici won a total of 26 Olympic, World and European medals in her career, including 11 gold medals. She is currently ranked fifth in terms of the total number of medals won at the World Championships, behind Simone Biles, Svetlana Khorkina, Gina Gogean and Larisa Latynina. She is also one of only 10 female gymnasts to have medalled in all six events at the World Championships.

== Post-retirement ==
Miloșovici announced her official retirement in the summer of 1997. After retiring, she returned to Lugoj to coach gymnastics and attended the Sports University in Timișoara.

On 23 October 1999, Milo married her childhood friend, Cosmin Vinatu. According to Prosport, Cosmin was a sergeant major in the police force. The two were childhood friends, but lost touch when Milo moved to Deva. Then, in 1998, Milo was out with her brother and a group of his friends and they ran into Cosmin at a bar. Their wedding took place at the Termal restaurant in Timișoara, with over 350 guests. Milo told Prosport that the couple expected to live in Timișoara after the wedding, though she does own a house in her hometown of Lugoj. They had one daughter, Denisa Florentina, who was born in 2004 and died in 2008. Milosovici grieves chronically for the loss of her daughter, Denisa, going to the cemetery once or twice per week with her family. The child's godmother was former teammate Simona Amânar. In January 2013, Lavinia gave birth to a boy, Cosmin Mihai, and in July 2016 Lavinia's second son, Andrei Nicolae, was born. In-between the birth of her first and second sons, she suffered a miscarriage.

In 2002, Miloșovici, along with former teammates Corina Ungureanu and Claudia Presăcan, sparked controversy by posing naked in photographs for a Japanese photobook, LCC Gold, and performing gymnastics routines topless for the Japanese DVDs Gold Bird and Euro Angels. A number of photographs from the photobook and DVDs were subsequently published in the Japanese magazine Shukan Gendai, and an edited version of the DVDs entitled 3 Gold Girls was released in Germany in 2004. Because the gymnasts had posed for some of the photographs and footage wearing their official Romanian team leotards, the Romanian Gymnastics Federation banned them from coaching and judging in the country for five years, and the Japanese Junior Gymnastic Club Federation contemplated banning Romanian gymnasts from a major international junior competition.

== Competitive history ==
| Year | Event | Team | AA | VT | UB | BB | FX |
|---|---|---|---|---|---|---|---|
| 1990 | American Cup | | 5 | | | | |
| 1990 | World Sports Fair | | 7 | 3rd place, bronze medalist(s) | | | 3rd place, bronze medalist(s) |
| 1990 | International Mixed Pairs | 6 | | | | | |
| 1990 | GBR-ROM Junior Dual Meet | | 1st place, gold medalist(s) | | | | |
| 1991 | Romanian Nationals | | 1st place, gold medalist(s) | 1st place, gold medalist(s) | | 2nd place, silver medalist(s) | |
| 1991 | European Championships (Junior) | | 6 | 1st place, gold medalist(s) | | 2nd place, silver medalist(s) | 1st place, gold medalist(s) |
| 1991 | World Sports Fair | | 7 | 3rd place, bronze medalist(s) | | | 3rd place, bronze medalist(s) |
| 1991 | World Championships | 3rd place, bronze medalist(s) | 7 | 1st place, gold medalist(s) | | 3rd place, bronze medalist(s) | 4 |
| 1991 | Chunichi Cup | | 4 | | | | |
| 1991 | International Championships of Romania | | 1st place, gold medalist(s) | | | | 1st place, gold medalist(s) |
| 1991 | DTB Cup | | 1st place, gold medalist(s) | | | | |
| 1991 | GER-ROM Dual Meet | 1st place, gold medalist(s) | 2nd place, silver medalist(s) | | | | |
| 1991 | Seiko Grand Prix | | 1st place, gold medalist(s) | 1st place, gold medalist(s) | 2nd place, silver medalist(s) | 5 | 1st place, gold medalist(s) |
| 1992 | Romanian Nationals | | 1st place, gold medalist(s) | 1st place, gold medalist(s) | 1st place, gold medalist(s) | | 1st place, gold medalist(s) |
| 1992 | World Championships | | | 4 | 1st place, gold medalist(s) | | 8 |
| 1992 | Olympic Games | 2nd place, silver medalist(s) | 3rd place, bronze medalist(s) | 1st place, gold medalist(s) | 4 | 8 | 1st place, gold medalist(s) |
| 1992 | Chunichi Cup | | 1st place, gold medalist(s) | | | | |
| 1992 | DTB Cup | | 3rd place, bronze medalist(s) | | | | |
| 1992 | GER-ROM Dual Meet | 1st place, gold medalist(s) | 5 | | | | |
| 1992 | HUN-ROM Dual Meet | 1st place, gold medalist(s) | 2nd place, silver medalist(s) | | | | |
| 1992 | Milan Grand Prix | | 1st place, gold medalist(s) | | | | |
| 1992 | ROM-CIS-ITA Tri-Meet | | 1st place, gold medalist(s) | | | | |
| 1993 | Romanian Nationals | | 1st place, gold medalist(s) | 1st place, gold medalist(s) | 3rd place, bronze medalist(s) | 1st place, gold medalist(s) | 1st place, gold medalist(s) |
| 1993 | World Championships | | 8 | 2nd place, silver medalist(s) | 5 | 1st place, gold medalist(s) | 5 |
| 1993 | Chunichi Cup | | 1st place, gold medalist(s) | | | | |
| 1993 | DTB Cup | | | 1st place, gold medalist(s) | 8 | 1st place, gold medalist(s) | 7 |
| 1993 | European Cup | | 3rd place, bronze medalist(s) | 1st place, gold medalist(s) | 1st place, gold medalist(s) | 6 | 2nd place, silver medalist(s) |
| 1993 | Kosice International | | 1st place, gold medalist(s) | | | | |
| 1993 | French International | | | 2nd place, silver medalist(s) | | | |
| 1993 | Tokyo Cup | | | 1st place, gold medalist(s) | 5 | | 2nd place, silver medalist(s) |
| 1993 | Birmingham Classic | | 1st place, gold medalist(s) | | | | |
| 1993 | International Championships of Romania | | 1st place, gold medalist(s) | 1st place, gold medalist(s) | 1st place, gold medalist(s) | 1st place, gold medalist(s) | |
1994
| 1994 | European Championships | 1st place, gold medalist(s) | 6 | 1st place, gold medalist(s) | 7 | 3rd place, bronze medalist(s) | 2nd place, silver medalist(s) |
| 1994 | World Championships | | 2nd place, silver medalist(s) | 3rd place, bronze medalist(s) | 6 | 5 | 2nd place, silver medalist(s) |
| 1994 | World Team Championships | 1st place, gold medalist(s) | | | | | |
| 1994 | Chunichi Cup | | 2nd place, silver medalist(s) | | | | |
| 1994 | Birmingham Classic | | 1st place, gold medalist(s) | | | | |
| 1994 | USA-ROM Dual Meet | 1st place, gold medalist(s) | 5 | | | | |
| 1994 | International Championships of Romania | | 1st place, gold medalist(s) | 1st place, gold medalist(s) | 1st place, gold medalist(s) | | 1st place, gold medalist(s) |
| 1995 | Romanian Nationals | | 1st place, gold medalist(s) | | | | |
| 1995 | World Championships | 1st place, gold medalist(s) | 3rd place, bronze medalist(s) | | 5 | | |
| 1995 | Chunichi Cup | | 1st place, gold medalist(s) | | | | |
| 1995 | DTB Cup | | | 2nd place, silver medalist(s) | 3rd place, bronze medalist(s) | 3rd place, bronze medalist(s) | 1st place, gold medalist(s) |
| 1995 | Arthur Gander Memorial | | 1st place, gold medalist(s) | | | | |
| 1995 | Messe Cup | 1st place, gold medalist(s) | | | | | |
| 1995 | ROM-GER Dual Meet | 1st place, gold medalist(s) | 1st place, gold medalist(s) | | | | |
1996
| 1996 | European Championships | 1st place, gold medalist(s) | 3rd place, bronze medalist(s) | | 4 | | 1st place, gold medalist(s) |
| 1996 | World Championships | | | | 10 | | 3rd place, bronze medalist(s) |
| 1996 | Olympic Games | 3rd place, bronze medalist(s) | 3rd place, bronze medalist(s) | | 8 | | |
| 1996 | Messe Cup | | 3rd place, bronze medalist(s) | | | | |

== See also ==
- List of Olympic female gymnasts for Romania
- List of Olympic medal leaders in women's gymnastics
- List of top female medalists at the World Artistic Gymnastics Championships
