= Vasiliki Tsavdaridou =

Greek artistic gymnast (born 1980)

- Born: 29 October 1980 (age 45) Thessaloniki, Greece
- Height: 1.42 m (4 ft 8 in)

Gymnastics career
- Discipline: Women's artistic gymnastics
- Country represented: Greece
- Eponymous skills: Tsavdaridou (balance beam and floor exercise)
Medal record
Representing Greece
Mediterranean Games
Silver medal – second place	1997 Bari	Balance beam
Silver medal – second place	1997 Bari	Floor exercise

Vasiliki Tsavdaridou (born 29 October 1980) is a Greek artistic gymnast. She represented Greece at the 1996 Summer Olympics. She also won two silver medals at the 1997 Mediterranean Games.

== Eponymous skills ==
Tsavdaridou has two eponymous skills listed in the Code of Points.

Apparatus	Name	Description	Difficulty (Note: Valid for the 2025–2028 Code of Points)
Balance beam	Tsavdaridou	Round-off at end of beam - flic-flac with 1/1 turn (360°) into swing down to cross straddle sit	D (0.4)
Floor exercise	Tsavdaridou	Arabian with ¼ twist (90°) – free cartwheel – continuing with ¼ twist (90°) to front lying support	A (0.1)
