= Joana Juárez =

Spanish gymnast

Personal information
- Nationality: Spanish
- Born: 5 August 1980 (age 44); Barcelona, Spain

Sport
- Sport: Gymnastics

Joana Juárez Roura (born 5 August 1980) is a Spanish gymnast. She competed at the 1996 Summer Olympics, where she finished 24th in the individual all around.
