= Magnificent Seven (gymnastics) =

United States 1996 Olympic women's gymnastic team

- Full name: Amanda Borden, Amy Chow, Dominique Dawes, Shannon; Miller, Dominique Moceanu, Jaycie Phelps, and Kerri Strug

Gymnastics career
- Discipline: Women's artistic gymnastics
- Country represented: United States
Medal record
Representing United States
Olympic Games
| Gold medal – first place | 1996 Atlanta | Team |
| Gold medal – first place | 1996 Atlanta | Balance beam |
| Silver medal – second place | 1996 Atlanta | Uneven bars |
| Bronze medal – third place | 1996 Atlanta | Floor exercise |

The Magnificent Seven was the 1996 United States Olympic women's gymnastics team that won the first-ever gold medal for the United States in the women's team competition at the 1996 Summer Olympics in Atlanta. The seven members of the team were Shannon Miller, Dominique Moceanu, Dominique Dawes, Kerri Strug, Amy Chow, Jaycie Phelps, and team captain Amanda Borden. Miller, Chow, and Dawes also won an individual gold, silver, and bronze medals respectively in Atlanta. The team is perhaps best known for Strug sticking the landing of a vault to clinch the gold medal while injured.

== 1996 Olympics ==
=== Individual stars ===
The leader of the Magnificent Seven is often said to be Shannon Miller, the second most decorated American gymnast in history and that year's reigning national champion. The other two individual stars on the team were Dominique Dawes and Dominique Moceanu, the previous two national champions (in 1994 and 1995 respectively). However, Kerri Strug eventually qualified for the individual all-around over Moceanu.

The other three members on the team were less heralded. Nevertheless, they were an integral part of the team's success. Amy Chow had the highest difficulty of anyone on the team, most notably on the uneven bars. Jaycie Phelps provided clean lines and solid gymnastics on all four events. The final member to qualify for the team, Amanda Borden, was named team captain.

The highest two scoring athletes on the team during the compulsories did not even perform at the Olympic Trials. Both Miller and Moceanu had been sidelined with injuries but were named to the team anyway, proving that the petition system was in the team's best interest.

=== Team competition ===
==== Compulsories ====
The team compulsories took place on July 21, 1996. Unlike in the 1992 Games, when two athletes from each country participated in each session, in these Games, teams competed together. The United States team competed in the third session, with Russia and China left to compete in the fourth session. Romania had already competed in the first session, so the United States team could only chase their already posted scores. The top four teams would compete in the last session during the optionals. Ultimately, Ukraine, not China, earned this fourth spot along with the United States, Russia, and Romania.

With seven athletes on each team for the first and only time, each team (other than Romania who had only six members because of an injury) put their six best team members up on each event. Of these six scores, only the top five would count. On the United States team in both compulsories and optionals, Miller, Moceanu, Dawes, Strug, and Phelps competed on all four events while Chow only competed on bars and vault and Borden only competed on beam and floor. The United States started their meet on uneven bars with no major misses. Miller earned the highest score of 9.775, and Strug's score of 9.675 was dropped.

Following uneven bars, the team moved to the balance beam where Strug led off with a shaky performance. Borden and Dawes followed, each with noticeable errors. Phelps, who won the compulsory round at the Olympic Trials (although neither Miller or Moceanu competed at this event), was next. Although known for her beautiful technique, she looked shaky from the start of the routine and fell off the beam during the fouette jump element. Although she finished strongly, her low score of 9.012 was dropped. Miller followed with a routine that appeared to be flawless and earned the overall high beam score of the competition, 9.737. Moceanu anchored the United States and with only minor errors and impeccable form on certain elements earned a 9.687.

Next, the group moved to floor exercise where everyone performed well, with no major errors. Strug earned the team's high score of 9.825, and Phelps' score of 9.662 was dropped. At this point in the competition, the United States was still trailing Romania as the team moved to vault.

Everyone vaulted well, with Dawes, Miller, and Strug sticking their landings. Chow essentially stuck her landing as well, with only a minor slide of her left foot. The United States surpassed Romania after this rotation, but Russia would later qualify first to optionals.

==== Optionals ====
As in the compulsory round, the United States started the competition on uneven bars. Everyone performed well with Miller, Strug, and Phelps tying with the team's low score of 9.787. Dawes posted the team's high score of 9.850 and combined with their scores from compulsories, both Dawes and Chow qualified for event finals. The team then moved to the balance beam.

Putting their rocky compulsory round behind them, the team performed well on the beam without any major errors. Miller posted one of the competition's high beam scores of 9.862 (Kui Yuanyuan of China had the highest score of 9.875) and qualified first to the event finals, ahead of Moceanu who earned a 9.850 and qualified second. Phelps' score of 9.600 was dropped.

As the event took place in Atlanta, the crowd was heavily pro-United States, and the cheering and flash photography was at an unprecedented level. The crowd continued to cheer on its team as the group moved to the floor exercise where Phelps led off with a great start. Borden, Moceanu, and Dawes followed, all without significant error. As predicted, Moceanu's floor music, "The Devil Went Down to Georgia," was a smash hit with the already raucous crowd. Following Dawes was Miller who showed the first obvious error in any of the American routines when she under-rotated her opening tumbling pass, a double layout. Although a major break, Miller avoided touching the floor with her hands, finished strongly, and the team ultimately dropped her score of 9.618. Strug anchored the team and earned a 9.837, qualifying first to event finals along with Moceanu who also earned a 9.837 and qualified fourth. Dawes, who posted the team's high optionals floor exercise score of 9.850, would have qualified seventh to the event finals but because of the rule that only two gymnasts from each country can compete, she was to be left out. The team was leading Russia by .897 as the group moved to the vault.

In the team competition, each gymnast performed two vaults however, only the higher score of the two vaults was counted. Phelps led the team off, followed by Chow, Miller, and Dawes, all with strong showings. With a narrow lead, Moceanu vaulted next, needing a 9.762 to secure the gold medal. On both of Moceanu's attempts, she was severely under-rotated and fell backward onto the mat. She earned only a 9.200 which was not enough to clinch the gold medal as Russia was still performing on the floor, with 1994 floor world champion Dina Kochetkova and reigning Russian national floor champion Roza Galieva still to perform their routines. The Russian team could have won gold if their last three scores averaged over 9.816, which was well within their capabilities. Strug, Moceanu, Dominique Dawes, Romanian gymnasts Simona Amânar and Gina Gogean, and Chinese gymnast Ji Liya had all received floor scores of 9.825 or higher earlier that night from the same judging panel.

Strug vaulted next as the anchor of the team and performed the same vault as Moceanu, also falling backward onto the mat. Upon standing up, it became apparent that Strug had suffered an injury to her ankle. As it was unknown to the team that they had already secured the gold medal, Strug was encouraged by her coach, Béla Károlyi, to vault again. Karolyi continuously chanted, "You can do it, Kerri!" which later became a mantra in popular culture.

The secondary story, often overlooked by the public, is that both Strug and Moceanu were in a tight contest with each other and with Dawes to qualify to the individual All-Around competition. Only three gymnasts per country could advance to the All-Around final, and had Strug not vaulted again, she would have finished fourth behind Miller, Dawes, and Moceanu. Exactly how this may have played a factor is unknown, but unlike the other U.S. gymnasts who opted to perform an easier vault first, Moceanu and Strug both performed their harder Yurchenko 1.5 for both attempts, despite warming up the easier Yurchenko half. Karolyi's strategy may have been to maximize the scores of his own gymnasts for All-Around qualification, rather than secure safe vault scores for the team first. Moceanu and Strug needed vault scores of 9.450 and 9.775 respectively to qualify ahead of Dawes.

Strug walked around, trying to shake off the injury to her ankle, as she headed back to the start of the vaulting runway with Karolyi's and her teammates' encouragement. With the scores of the three best Russian floor workers yet to be posted, Strug needed to vault a second time to secure the gold medal for her team and prevent the Russians from catching up. She performed the second vault well and nearly stuck the landing, however, she immediately lifted her injured leg and collapsed in pain, needing to be carried off the podium. Strug scored a 9.712, securing the gold medal, and the crowd erupted with cheers. This image of Strug's vault instantly became the most enduring moment of the 1996 Olympics and one of the most celebrated moments in American Olympic history. Strug not only qualified for vault finals but also for the All-Around competition. In a twist of irony, the vault that secured her place in the All-Around also prohibited her from participating as she was too injured to compete, and Moceanu took her place. Miller took her place in the vault finals, and Dawes took her place in the floor finals. Additionally, Dawes qualified for vault finals during this competition, earning the team's high vault score of 9.762.

Strug was immediately carried away to a hospital tent, however, Karolyi, adamant that she not miss the medal ceremony, eventually carried her to the podium behind the team. Miller moved out of her assigned place in line (based on height) to Strug's left side to help lift Strug onto the podium along with Moceanu who was on Strug's right. Because of being whisked away from the team and the thick bandage on her leg, Strug didn't have time to put the pants of her warm-up suit on and thus was the only one not wearing them. Because of these factors, the resulting team photographs show a less uniform look amongst the teammates than in other years.

Despite Strug's heroic vault, Miller was the team's highest-scoring member of the team competition, earning the second-highest two-day total in the entire competition (78.028, behind Lilia Podkopayeva's 78.061). However, Dawes (39.187) was the team's highest-scoring member during the optionals portion of the competition (only Simona Amânar's optionals score of 39.387 was higher than that of Dawes), and Strug's optionals total (39.073) also narrowly outscored Miller's (38.967).

The team's gold medal victory was considered phenomenal for the United States because Russia (in its incarnations as the Soviet Union and Unified Team) had won the event in every Olympics it had entered since 1952. Furthermore, the United States had never won the event in either the Olympics or the World Championships, yet in Atlanta, they fielded the deepest American team in history up to that point and upstaged both the Russians and the reigning World Champions Romanians.

Winning the gold medal instantly endeared the team to the American public, and tours, endorsement deals, interviews, and televised specials followed, earning them all a secure place in American Olympic and gymnastics history.

=== Olympic team scores ===
| Rank | Team | Vault | | | Uneven Bars | | | Balance Beam | | | Floor | | | Total | Rank |
| Rank | Team | C | O | Rank | C | O | Rank | C | O | Rank | C | O | Rank | Total | Rank |
|---|---|---|---|---|---|---|---|---|---|---|---|---|---|---|---|
| Gold medal | United States | 97.209 | | 2 | 97.809 | | 1 | 96.410 | | 2 | 97.797 | | 1 | 389.225 | |
| Gold medal | Shannon Miller | 9.762 | 9.700 | 10 | 9.775 | 9.787 | 9 | 9.737 | 9.862 | 1 | 9.787 | 9.618 | 18 | 78.028 | 2 |
| Gold medal | Dominique Dawes | 9.725 | 9.762 | 8 | 9.762 | 9.850 | 5 | 9.425 | 9.725 | 11 | 9.687 | 9.850 | 7 | 77.786 | 6 |
| Gold medal | Kerri Strug* | 9.812 | 9.712 | 5 | 9.675 | 9.787 | 14 | 9.350 | 9.737 | 15 | 9.825 | 9.837 | 1 | 77.735 | 7 |
| Gold medal | Dominique Moceanu | 9.662 | 9.200 | 48 | 9.725 | 9.812 | 11 | 9.687 | 9.850 | 2 | 9.750 | 9.837 | 4 | 77.523 | 11 |
| Gold medal | Jaycie Phelps | 9.587 | 9.662 | 21 | 9.712 | 9.787 | 13 | 9.012 | 9.600 | 38 | 9.662 | 9.750 | 15 | 76.722 | 17 |
| Gold medal | Amy Chow | 9.700 | 9.712 | 11 | 9.762 | 9.837 | 6 | | | | | | | 39.011 | 95 |
| Gold medal | Amanda Borden | | | | | | | 9.312 | 9.725 | 19 | 9.712 | 9.762 | 10 | 38.511 | 97 |

*Strug qualified to the all-around, vault, and floor finals, but did not participate in any due to injuring her ankle during Team Optionals. Moceanu took her place in the all-around, Miller took her place in the vault final, and Dawes took her place in the floor final.

For all team scores see Gymnastics at the 1996 Summer Olympics – Women's artistic team all-around.

=== Individual All-Around finals ===
In the individual All-Around finals, Dominique Moceanu had a big balance check after her punch front on the balance beam which ultimately knocked her out of contention when she only scored a 9.600. Despite the low score she still managed to finish 9th in the all-around. In stark contrast, Dominique Dawes and Shannon Miller both started out on the uneven bars, and after the first two rotations (uneven bars and balance beam) they were in 1st and 2nd place respectively. The excitement, however, proved to be short-lived. Miller came up short on her first tumbling pass on floor (a double layout), and stepped out of bounds on her last tumbling pass on floor (a full twisting double back). A score of 9.475 dashed any dreams of a medal for her. Next up was Dawes, and while doing a punch front on floor she fell out of bounds. She scored a 9.000 and just like that team USA was completely out of the all-around contention. Miller ended up placing 8th, while Dawes placed 17th. World champion Lilia Podkopayeva took the title and the gold, while the three Romanians took revenge for their disappointing team bronze by sweeping the other medals (Gina Gogean won silver, and Simona Amânar and Lavinia Miloşovici tied for bronze).

=== Event finals ===
==== Vault ====
During the event finals team USA did considerably better. On day one of the event finals on vault, both Shannon Miller (subbing for an injured Kerri Strug) and Dominique Dawes competed. Neither was flawless, with Miller falling on her second vault, and they finished 6th (Dawes) and 8th (Miller). Simona Amânar of Romania won with a 9.825 average, while Mo Huilan of China finished second (9.768) and Gina Gogean of Romania third (9.750).

==== Uneven bars ====
On the next event, uneven bars, both Amy Chow and Dominique Dawes competed. Amy Chow had a great routine to score a 9.837 which tied Bi Weijing for second. Svetlana Khorkina finished first (9.850) and Dominique Dawes finished fourth (9.800).

==== Balance beam ====
On the balance beam event finals was where the USA crowd saw the most drama. Dominique Moceanu and Shannon Miller were both competing, and they were both supposed to challenge for gold. Moceanu, however, had a very scary fall. During her flight series of a back handspring followed by three layouts, she missed her foot on the second layout but still flipped over and smashed her head into the beam. Somehow she was able to grab onto the beam with both hands, but the damage had already been done with a score of 9.125 and 6th place. Miller, however, did well to score a 9.862 and win the beam title.

This was the only individual gold for the United States at the 1996 Olympics and only the third-ever individual Olympic gold for U.S. women's gymnastics – the first in a non-boycotted Olympics. (Mary Lou Retton won all-around gold in 1984 and Julianne McNamara won gold on uneven bars in 1984). Since then, eight American female gymnasts have won individual Olympic gold medals: Carly Patterson (all-around in 2004), Nastia Liukin (all-around in 2008), Shawn Johnson (balance beam in 2008), Gabrielle Douglas (all-around in 2012), Aly Raisman (floor exercise in 2012), Simone Biles (all-around, vault, and floor exercise in 2016), Jade Carey (floor exercise in 2021), and Sunisa Lee (all around in 2021).

==== Floor exercise ====
Strug achieved the highest qualifying score in the floor exercise, but as with other individual events, had to withdraw. During the floor final Dominique Moceanu and Dominique Dawes both competed. They both had successful routines; however, Dawes performed better for a 9.837 and 3rd place, while Moceanu received a 9.825 and 4th place. The crowd loved Moceanu's cute choreography and presentation, but her tumbling was not as difficult as the three medalists.

== Post-Olympics ==
The Magnificent Seven went on tour after their gold medal performance. Strug, however, elected not to join the other six members and instead headlined a rival tour for considerably higher compensation than the other six.

The entire team appeared on a Wheaties cereal box and on several talk shows. Miller, once again the most successful member of the team following her five medal total in the Barcelona Games, captured the only individual gold for the American women. Her gold medal on the balance beam was a first for an American, followed only by Shawn Johnson at the 2008 games.

In 2008, the Magnificent Seven was inducted into the United States Olympic Hall of Fame in the team category. The team received their award in Chicago with other Olympic greats.

In 2012, viewers were able to vote on some of the greatest Olympic moments in NBC history for a special Top 30 Olympic Moments program to air July 21, prior to the London Olympics. Kerri Strug's vault was one of the clips and ended up receiving the most votes, placing first on the countdown. The Guardian put a list in the same year and the moment was ranked 40th.

On July 8–10, 2016 all of the Magnificent Seven were at the SAP center for the Olympic trials and the USA Gymnastics' Parade of Olympians on July 9 in San Jose, California.

== Gallery ==
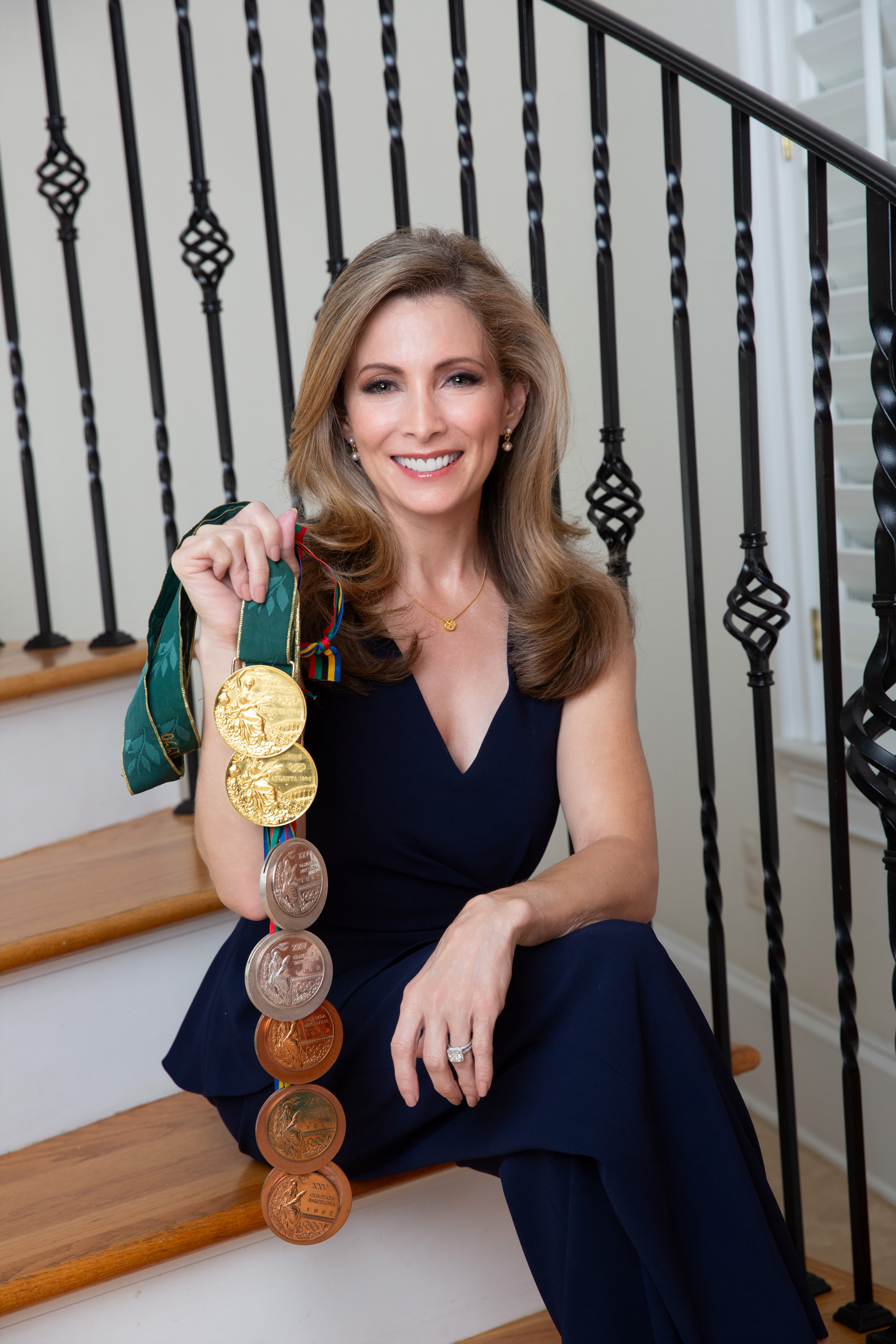
7-time Olympic medalist Shannon Miller

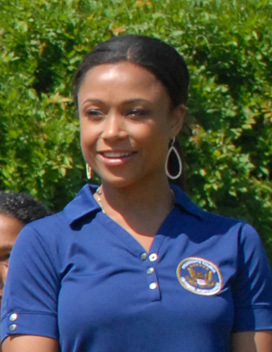
Dominique Dawes in 2011

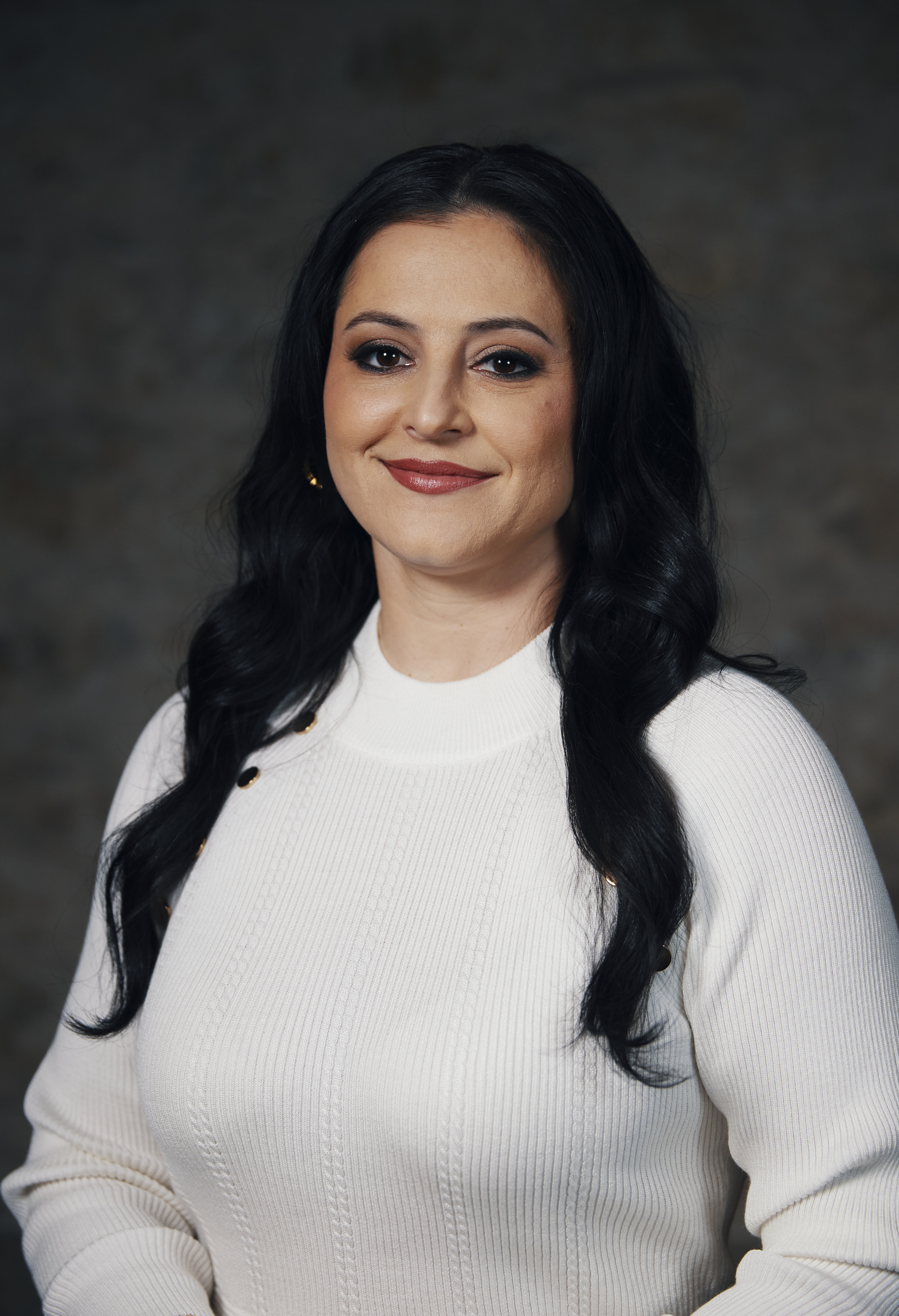
Dominique Moceanu in 2024

== See also ==
- Women's artistic gymnastics events at the 1996 Summer Olympics
- Fierce Five, the U.S. 2012 Summer Olympics women's artistic gymnastics team, who won the second team all-around gold medal
- Final Five, the U.S. 2016 Summer Olympics women's artistic gymnastics team, who won the third team all-around gold medal
- Golden Girls, the U.S. 2024 Summer Olympics women's artistic gymnastics team, who won the fourth team all-around gold medal
