= Golden Girls (gymnastics) =

USA women's gymnastics team at the 2024 Summer Olympics

- Full name: Simone Biles, Suni Lee, Jade Carey, Jordan Chiles, and Hezly Rivera

Gymnastics career
- Discipline: Women's artistic gymnastics
- Country represented: United States
Medal record
Representing United States
Olympic Games
Gold medal – first place	2024 Paris	Team
Gold medal – first place	2024 Paris	All-around
Gold medal – first place	2024 Paris	Vault
Silver medal – second place	2024 Paris	Floor Exercise
Bronze medal – third place	2024 Paris	All-around
Bronze medal – third place	2024 Paris	Vault
Bronze medal – third place	2024 Paris	Uneven Bars

The Golden Girls was the artistic gymnastics team that won the team gold medal for the United States in the women's team competition at the 2024 Summer Olympics in Paris. The five members of the team were Simone Biles, Suni Lee, Jade Carey, Jordan Chiles, and Hezly Rivera. Later in the Olympic Games, Biles won a gold medal in the individual all-around event, becoming the first person to win it in non-consecutive games, a gold medal on vault, and a silver medal on floor; Carey won bronze on vault; and Lee won bronze in the individual all-around and uneven bars.

== Team background ==
Simone Biles was a part of the gold medal-winning team, dubbed the Final Five, at the 2016 Rio Olympics, where Biles won gold in the all-around.

Biles, Chiles, and Lee were all part of the Tokyo 2020 silver medal-winning team, while Carey competed in Tokyo as an individual. Lee won gold in the all-around and Carey won gold on floor exercise.

== Olympic trials ==
The top all-around finisher at the 2024 Olympic trials, Simone Biles, was automatically named to her third Olympic team. Suni Lee, Jordan Chiles, and Jade Carey finished second, third, and fourth place, and were named to their second Olympic team by the selection committee. Hezly Rivera was the fifth person named to the team by the selection committee after placing fifth in the all-around. Joscelyn Roberson and Leanne Wong were named as traveling alternates for the women's team. Kaliya Lincoln and Tiana Sumanasekera were named as the non-traveling alternates.

== Captain and nickname ==
Simone Biles, the captain of the Fighting Four and the oldest member of the Golden Girls at 27 years old, was once again selected as team captain by her teammates.

The team members originally announced the name "FAAFO Five" (for "fuck around and find out") during the press conference following their victory in the team event. Biles later announced via social media that the team name would be "Golden Girls" as the average age of the team was 22.2, the oldest of any gold-winning American team.

== 2024 Summer Olympics ==
=== Qualifications ===
The United States qualified to the team final in first place, more than five points ahead of second place Italy. Biles, Chiles, and Lee competed on all four events while Carey competed on vault and floor exercise and Rivera competed on uneven bars and balance beam. For the individual all-around, Biles, Lee, and Chiles finished first, third, and fourth respectively, with Biles and Lee qualifying to final and Chiles missing out due to two-per-country limitations. On vault, Biles, Carey, and Chiles finished first, third, and fourth respectively with Biles and Carey qualifying to the final; Chiles was once again being eliminated due to two-per-country limitations. On the uneven bars Lee qualified to the final in third place, with Biles being first reserve for the final. On balance beam Biles and Lee qualified to the final in second and fourth respectively. On floor exercise Biles and Chiles qualified first and third respectively.

=== Team final ===
In the team final Biles and Chiles competed on all four apparatuses, Lee competed on all but vault, and Carey only competed on vault. They ended the competition with a score of 171.296, nearly six points ahead of second place Italy. This was the United States' fourth Olympic team title.

Team final results for the Golden Girls at the 2024 Summer Olympics
Gymnast	Vault (gymnastics)	Uneven bars	Balance beam	Floor (gymnastics)	Total
Simone Biles	14.900	14.400	14.366	14.666	58.332
Jade Carey	14.800				14.800
Jordan Chiles	14.400	14.366	12.733	13.966	55.465
Sunisa Lee		14.566	14.600	13.533	42.699
Hezly Rivera					
United States	44.100 (1)	43.332 (1)	41.699 (1)	42.165 (1)	171.296 (1)

=== Individual all-around ===
Biles won the all-around final with a score of 59.131 ahead of Rebeca Andrade of Brazil. Lee placed third with a score of 56.465. Biles became the third female gymnast to win two Olympic all-around titles after Larisa Latynina (1956–1960) and Věra Čáslavská (1964–1968) and the first to do so non-consecutively. Lee became the first reigning champion since Nadia Comaneci in 1980 to return to the Olympic all-around podium.

Individual all-around final at the 2024 Summer Olympics
Gymnast	Vault (gymnastics)	Uneven bars	Balance beam	Floor (gymnastics)	Total
Simone Biles	15.766	13.733	14.566	15.066	59.131
Sunisa Lee	13.933	14.866	14.000	13.666	56.465

=== Event finals ===
During the vault final Biles won gold after performing her eponymous Biles II vault (Yurchenko double pike) and a Cheng. Carey won bronze after performing a Cheng and double-twisting Yurchenko. Biles became the second woman to win two Olympic vault titles after Věra Čáslavská (1964–1968). During the uneven bars final Lee won bronze behind Kaylia Nemour and Qiu Qiyuan. During the balance beam final four of the eight competitors fell off of the apparatus, including both Biles and Lee. They ended up finishing fifth and six respectively. During the floor exercise final, Biles went out of bounds twice and incurred 0.6 points in neutral deductions. As a result she finished second behind Rebeca Andrade. Initially Chiles was given a score of 13.666, which put her in fifth place. Her coach Cécile Canqueteau-Landi filed an inquiry which was accepted and Chiles' score was raised by a tenth, giving her a final score of 13.766 which put her in bronze medal position. The Romanian Gymnastics Federation filed an appeal with the Court of Arbitration for Sport (CAS) which determined that the inquiry was filed four seconds past the 1 minute time limitation and therefore Chiles' score would revert back to 13.666, which put her back in fifth place. The International Olympic Committee upheld the ruling from CAS.

Event finals for the Golden Girls at the 2024 Summer Olympics
Gymnast	Vault (gymnastics)	Uneven bars	Balance beam	Floor (gymnastics)
Simone Biles	15.300		13.100 (5)	14.133
Jade Carey	14.466			
Jordan Chiles				13.666 (5)
Sunisa Lee		14.800	13.100 (6)	

== Post-Olympics ==
Biles, Carey, Chiles, and Rivera participated in the Gold Over America Tour. Additionally Carey and Chiles returned to NCAA gymnastics to compete in their senior and junior seasons respectively. Carey won the 2025 AAI Award, which is awarded to the top senior female gymnast in the nation. Chiles won the award the following year (2026).

Biles was named Sports Illustrated's 2024 Sportsperson of the Year and won the 2025 Laureus World Sports Award for Sportswoman of the Year. Chiles was named one of Time's 2025 Women of the Year. Chiles and Lee both appeared in the 2025 edition of the Sports Illustrated Swimsuit Issue with Chiles being selected as one of four cover models.

At the 2025 ESPY Awards Lee won the award for Best Comeback Athlete and Biles won both the Best Female Athlete ESPY Award and the Best Championship Performance award.

Chiles competed on the 34th season of Dancing with the Stars where she was partnered with Ezra Sosa. They finished third.

== See also ==
- Women's artistic gymnastics events at the 2024 Summer Olympics
- Magnificent Seven, the U.S. 1996 Summer Olympics women's artistic gymnastics team, who won the first team all-around gold medal
- Fierce Five, the U.S. 2012 Summer Olympics women's artistic gymnastics team, who won the second team all-around gold medal
- Final Five, the U.S. 2016 Summer Olympics women's artistic gymnastics team, who won the third team all-around gold medal
