= Fierce Five =

American women's artistic gymnastics team

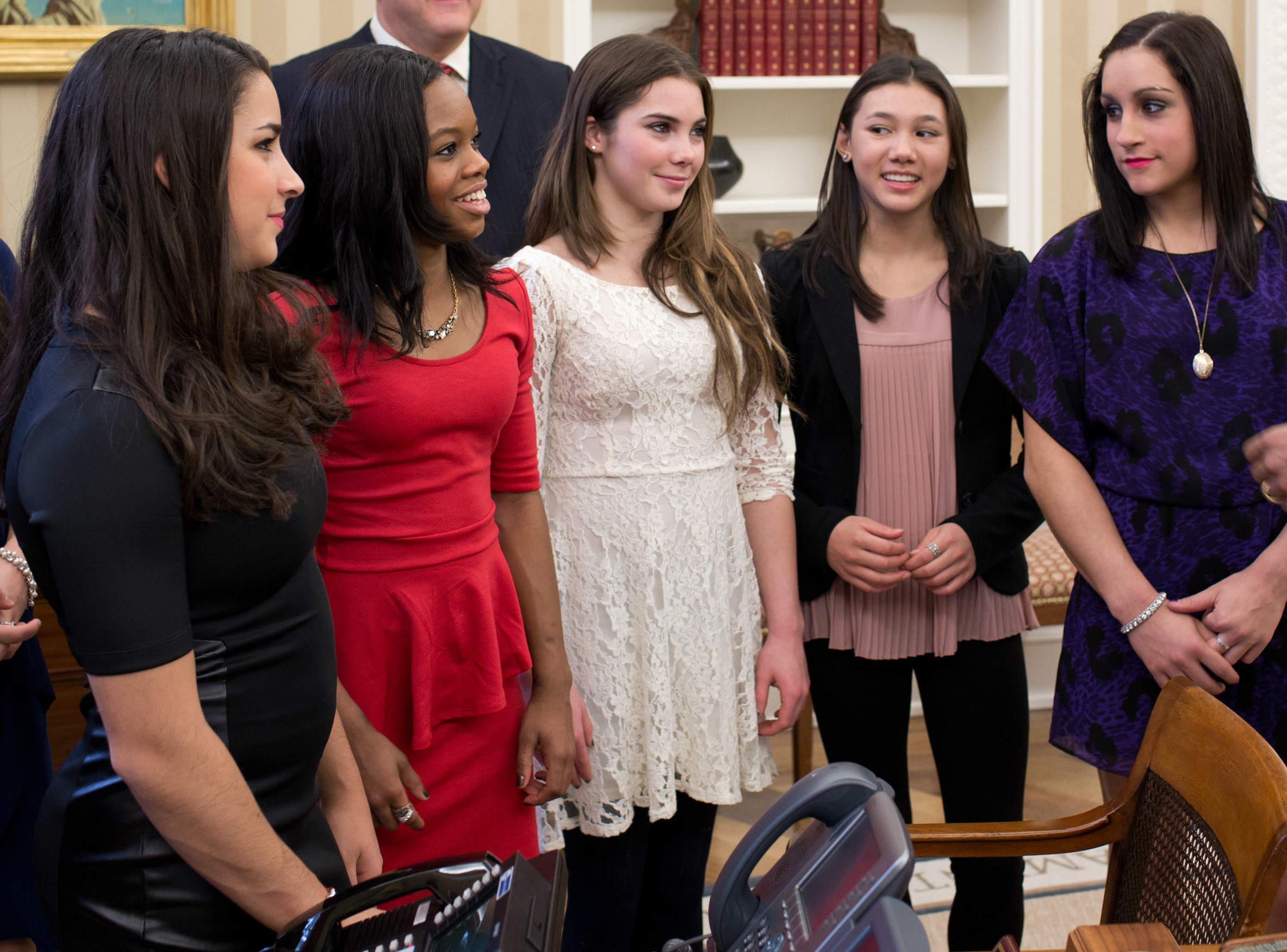
- Fierce Five members at the White House. Left to right: Aly Raisman, Gabby Douglas, McKayla Maroney, Kyla Ross, Jordyn Wieber

Personal information
- Full name: Gabby Douglas, McKayla Maroney, Aly Raisman, Kyla Ross, and Jordyn Wieber

Gymnastics career
- Discipline: Women's artistic gymnastics
- Country represented: United States
Medal record
Representing United States
Olympic Games
Gold medal – first place	2012 London	Team
Gold medal – first place	2012 London	All-around
Gold medal – first place	2012 London	Floor exercise
Silver medal – second place	2012 London	Vault
Bronze medal – third place	2012 London	Balance beam

The Fierce Five was the artistic gymnastics team that won the second team gold medal for the United States in the women's team competition at the 2012 Summer Olympics. Originally referred to as the Fab Five, the five members of the team were Gabby Douglas, McKayla Maroney, Aly Raisman, Kyla Ross, and Jordyn Wieber. Later in the Olympic Games, Douglas won a gold medal in the individual all-around event, becoming the first African-American ever to do so; Maroney won silver on the vault; Raisman, the team captain, won bronze on the balance beam and gold on the floor exercise.

== Team background ==
Aly Raisman, the oldest team member, became age eligible for senior international competitions in 2010. That year, she helped the American team win the silver medal behind Russia at the World Championships. Gabby Douglas, McKayla Maroney, and Jordyn Wieber began competing in senior competitions in 2011 and competed at the 2011 World Championships alongside Raisman, Sabrina Vega, and Alicia Sacramone. The team won the gold medal by over 4 points ahead of Russia. Wieber then won the individual all-around title while Raisman finished fourth. Maroney won the vault title, and Wieber and Raisman won bronze medals on the balance beam and floor exercise, respectively.

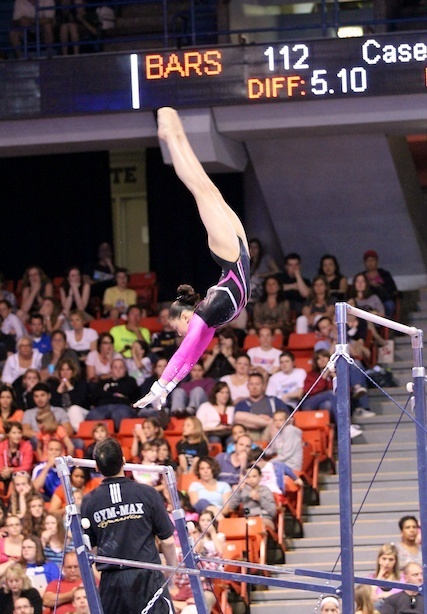
Ross competing at the 2012 U.S. Classic

Kyla Ross, the youngest team member, began competing in senior competitions in 2012. She made her senior debut at the 2012 Pacific Rim Championships alongside Wieber, Douglas, and three junior athletes, and they won the team title by nearly 20 points over China. Later that month, Ross, Maroney, and Raisman won another team gold medal at the City of Jesolo Trophy. Raisman won the all-around title ahead of Ross at the U.S. Classic while Douglas finished first on the uneven bars, Maroney finished first on the vault, and Wieber finished first on the balance beam. Then at the U.S. Championships, Wieber won the all-around title ahead of Douglas, while Raisman and Ross finished third and fourth, respectively. During the warmups, Maroney she fell on a tumbling pass and landed on her back. She was taken to the hospital and diagnosed with a minor concussion and nasal fracture. She was medically cleared to compete at the Olympic Trials less than three weeks later.

== Olympic Trials ==
The Olympic Trials for women's artistic gymnastics took place on Friday, June 29, and Sunday, July 1, 2012, at the SAP Center in San Jose, California. Both nights of the competition were broadcast by NBC. Heading into the Olympic Trials, Douglas, Wieber, and Raisman were considered locks for the team based on their all-around results that year.

Douglas, Wieber, and Raisman finished first, second, and third in the all-around competition. As the winner of the Olympic Trials, Douglas was the automatic qualifier for the team. Maroney won the vault competition, Douglas and Ross tied for first on the uneven bars, while Raisman won the balance beam and floor exercise. Afterward, Douglas, Maroney, Raisman, Ross, and Wieber were the five gymnasts chosen to represent the United States at the 2012 Summer Olympics. The team alternates were Sarah Finnegan, Anna Li, and Elizabeth Price.

Olympic Trials results for the Fierce Five
Gymnast	Day	Vault (gymnastics)	Uneven bars	Balance beam	Floor (gymnastics)	Total
Gabby Douglas	1	15.800	15.250	14.900	15.450	61.400
Gabby Douglas	2	16.000	15.900	14.850	15.300	62.050
Gabby Douglas	Total	31.800	31.150 (=1)	29.750 (6)	30.750 (3)	123.450 (1)
McKayla Maroney	1	16.100	13.350	13.650	15.200	58.300
McKayla Maroney	2	16.150	13.700	15.000	14.500	59.350
McKayla Maroney	Total	32.250 (1)	27.050 (11)	28.650 (10)	29.700 (5)	117.650 (7)
Aly Raisman	1	15.550	14.200	14.950	15.600	60.300
Aly Raisman	2	15.300	14.450	15.400	15.500	60.650
Aly Raisman	Total	30.850	28.650 (=8)	30.350 (1)	31.100 (1)	120.950 (3)
Kyla Ross	1	14.500	15.500	14.900	14.500	59.400
Kyla Ross	2	15.150	15.650	15.050	14.750	60.600
Kyla Ross	Total	29.650	31.150 (=1)	29.950 (=3)	29.250 (9)	120.000 (5)
Jordyn Wieber	1	15.900	15.350	15.050	15.400	61.700
Jordyn Wieber	2	15.800	15.350	14.900	15.600	61.650
Jordyn Wieber	Total	31.700	30.700 (4)	29.950 (=3)	31.000 (2)	123.350 (2)

== Nickname and captain ==
The U.S. media originally dubbed the team the "Fab Five" before the Olympic competition started. However, the "Fab Five" was also a nickname given to the five members of the Michigan college basketball team recruited in 1991. Jalen Rose, a former Michigan Fab Five member, complained about the gymnastics team being dubbed the Fab Five. Maroney and Wieber were credited for changing the team's nickname from the "Fab Five" to the "Fierce Five" a few days before their gold medal win at the Olympics while on the bus to a training session. They reportedly searched on their phones for words that started with F describing the team. The top choices were feisty and fierce. Maroney and Wieber opted for "fierce", as they said it described their floor routines, and the rest of the team concurred. Maroney also stated, "There have been Fab Fives in the past but I like Fierce Five because we are definitely the fiercest team out there." Despite the name change, some news sources still used the term Fab Five during the Olympics. When the U.S. won the team competition, NBC announcer Al Trautwig proclaimed, "The Fab Five is going gold!"

Raisman, the oldest on the team at 18 years old, was elected team captain by the other members. The team was featured on the cover of Sports Illustrated's Olympic Preview issue; it was the first time since 1996 that a gymnast had appeared on the cover of Sports Illustrated.

== 2012 Summer Olympics ==
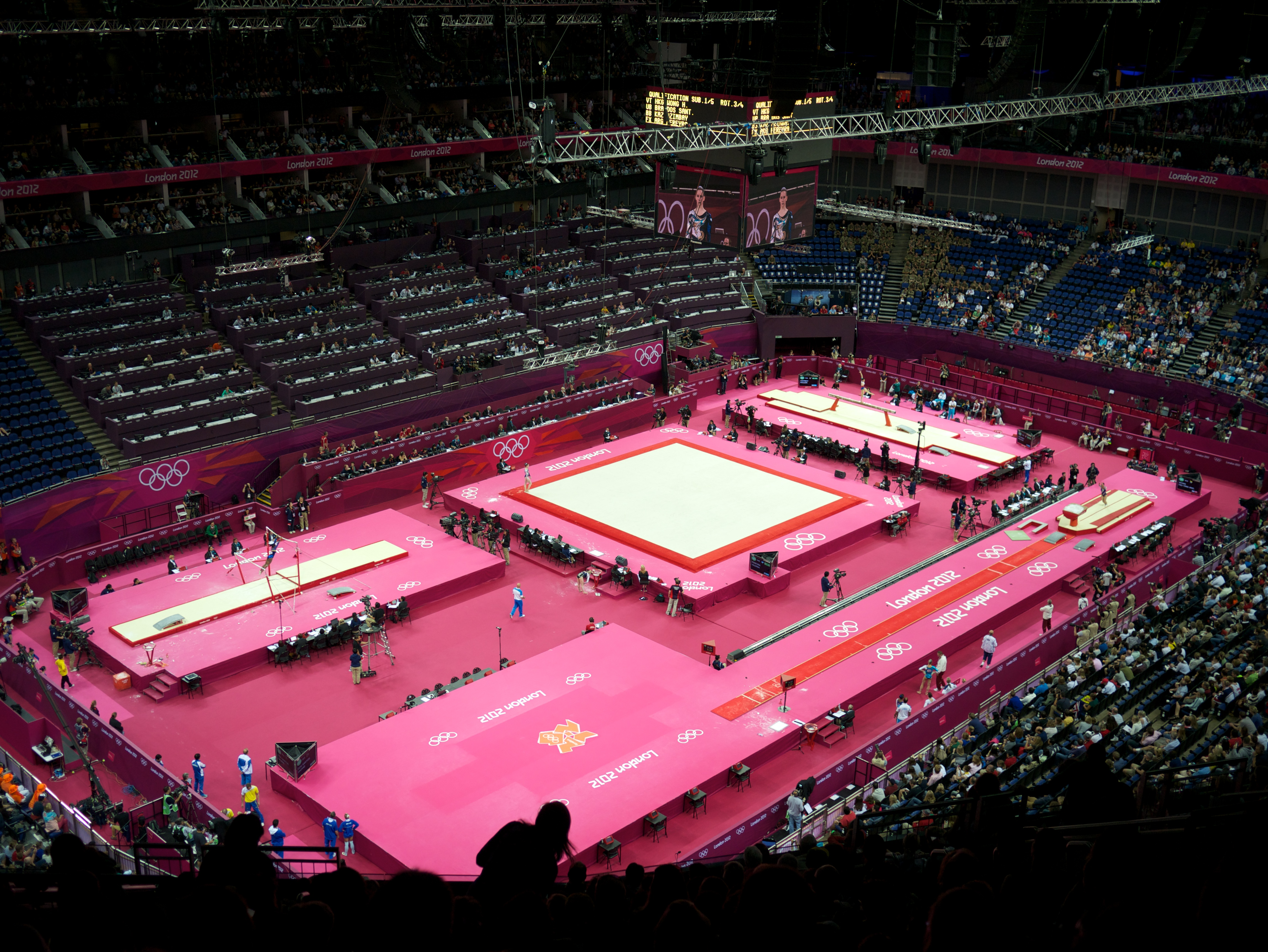
The North Greenwich Arena, pictured during the 2012 Summer Olympics

=== Qualifications ===
The United States qualified for the team final in first place with an overall score of 181.863. Wieber, Douglas, and Raisman competed on all four apparatus, Ross competed on uneven bars, balance beam, and floor exercise, and Maroney only competed on vault. Raisman, Douglas, and Wieber qualified in second, third, and fourth place for the individual all-around competition. However, due to the rule allowing only the top two from each country to compete in an individual final, only Raisman and Douglas advanced.

Qualification results for the Fierce Five at the 2012 Summer Olympics
Gymnast	Vault (gymnastics)		Uneven bars		Balance beam		Floor (gymnastics)		Total	
Gymnast	Score (Note: Gymnasts who wanted to qualify for the vault final performed a second vault, with the average of the two counting for event final qualification. Only the first vault counted for individual and team all-around qualification.)	Rank	Score	Rank	Score	Rank	Score	Rank	Score	Rank
Gabby Douglas	15.900		15.333	6	15.266	3	13.766	33	60.265	3
McKayla Maroney	15.900/15.700; Avg: 15.800	1								
Aly Raisman	15.800		14.166	23	15.100	5	15.325	1	60.391	2
Kyla Ross			14.866	11	15.075	6	13.733	34		
Jordyn Wieber	15.833		14.833	12	14.700	12	14.666	6	60.032	4
United States	47.633	1	45.032	4	45.441	1	43.757	2	181.863	1

=== Team final ===
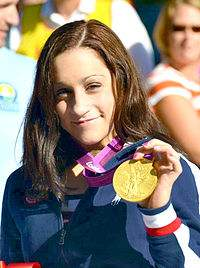
Wieber at a parade after the 2012 Summer Olympics with her gold medal

In the team final, Douglas competed in the all-around, Wieber competed on three events, Raisman and Ross competed on two events, and Maroney once again only competed on the vault. On the vault, Wieber, Douglas and Maroney all competed well-executed Amanar vaults, giving them a large lead after the first rotation that the team held onto for the rest of the competition. The team finished with a score of 183.596, 5.066 points higher than second-place Russia- an "unheard-of" margin of victory. They became the second U.S. team, after the "Magnificent Seven" in 1996, to win the team competition. Additionally, this was the sixth consecutive Olympic medal for the United States in the women's team competition.

Team final results for the Fierce Five at the 2012 Summer Olympics
Gymnast	Vault (gymnastics)	Uneven bars	Balance beam	Floor (gymnastics)	Total
Gabby Douglas	15.966	15.200	15.233	15.066	61.465
McKayla Maroney	16.233				
Aly Raisman			14.933	15.300	
Kyla Ross		14.933	15.133		
Jordyn Wieber	15.933	14.666		15.000	
United States	48.132 (1)	44.799 (3)	45.299 (1)	45.366 (1)	183.596 (1)

=== Individual all-around ===
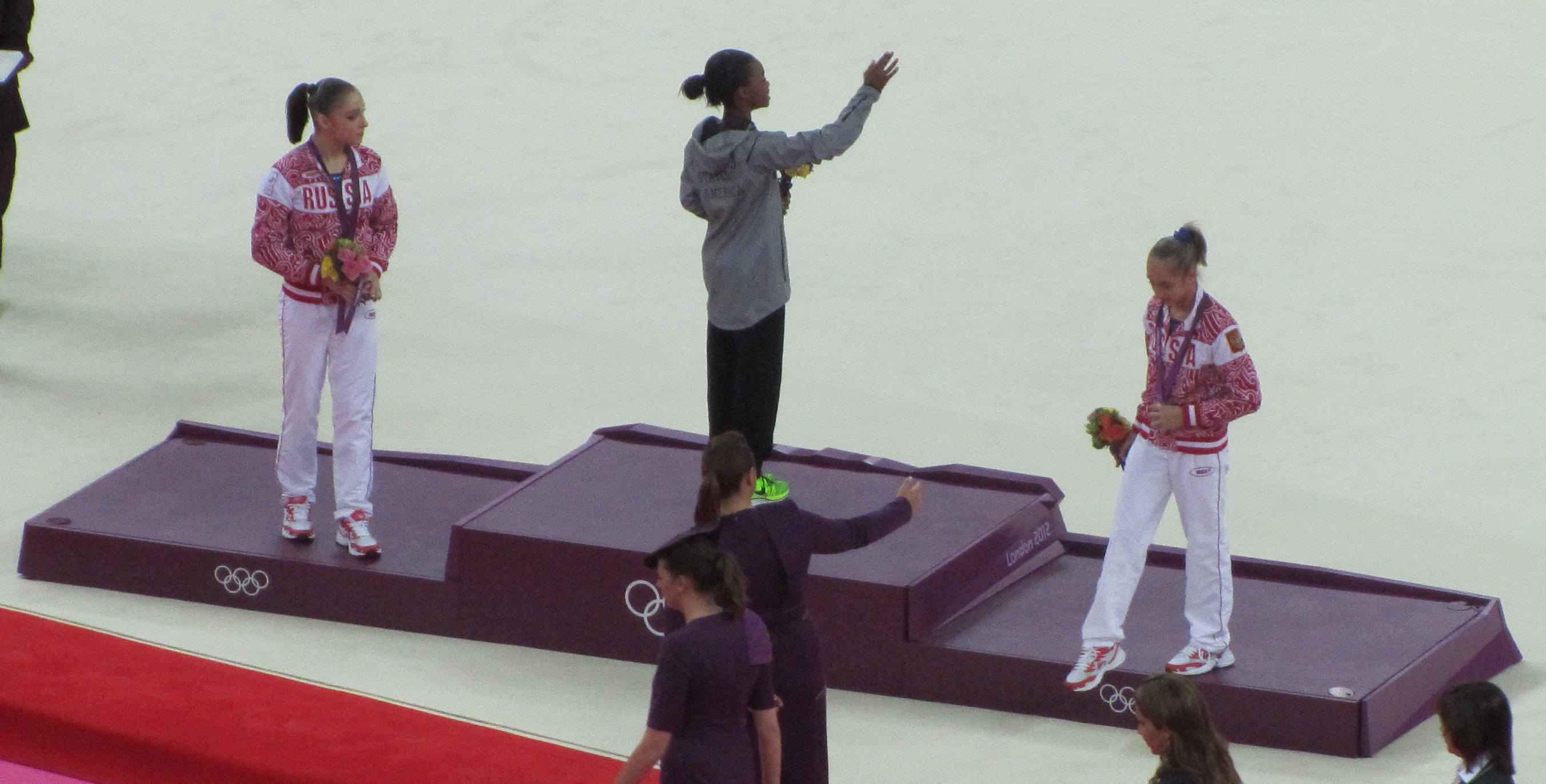
Douglas (center) on the Olympic all-around podium

In the individual all-around final, Douglas won the gold medal, becoming the first Black woman to win the event. She was also the first American gymnast to win the team and individual all-around gold medals at the same Olympics. Raisman tied for the third-highest score with Russian Aliya Mustafina. However, a tiebreaker was used to determine the bronze medalist, in which the three highest apparatus scores were counted. This led to Mustafina winning the bronze medal while Raisman finished fourth.

Individual all-around final for the Fierce Five at the 2012 Summer Olympics
Gymnast	Vault (gymnastics)	Uneven bars	Balance beam	Floor (gymnastics)	Total
Gabby Douglas	15.966	15.733	15.500	15.033	62.232 (1)
Aly Raisman	15.900	14.333	14.200	15.133	59.566 (4)

=== Event finals ===
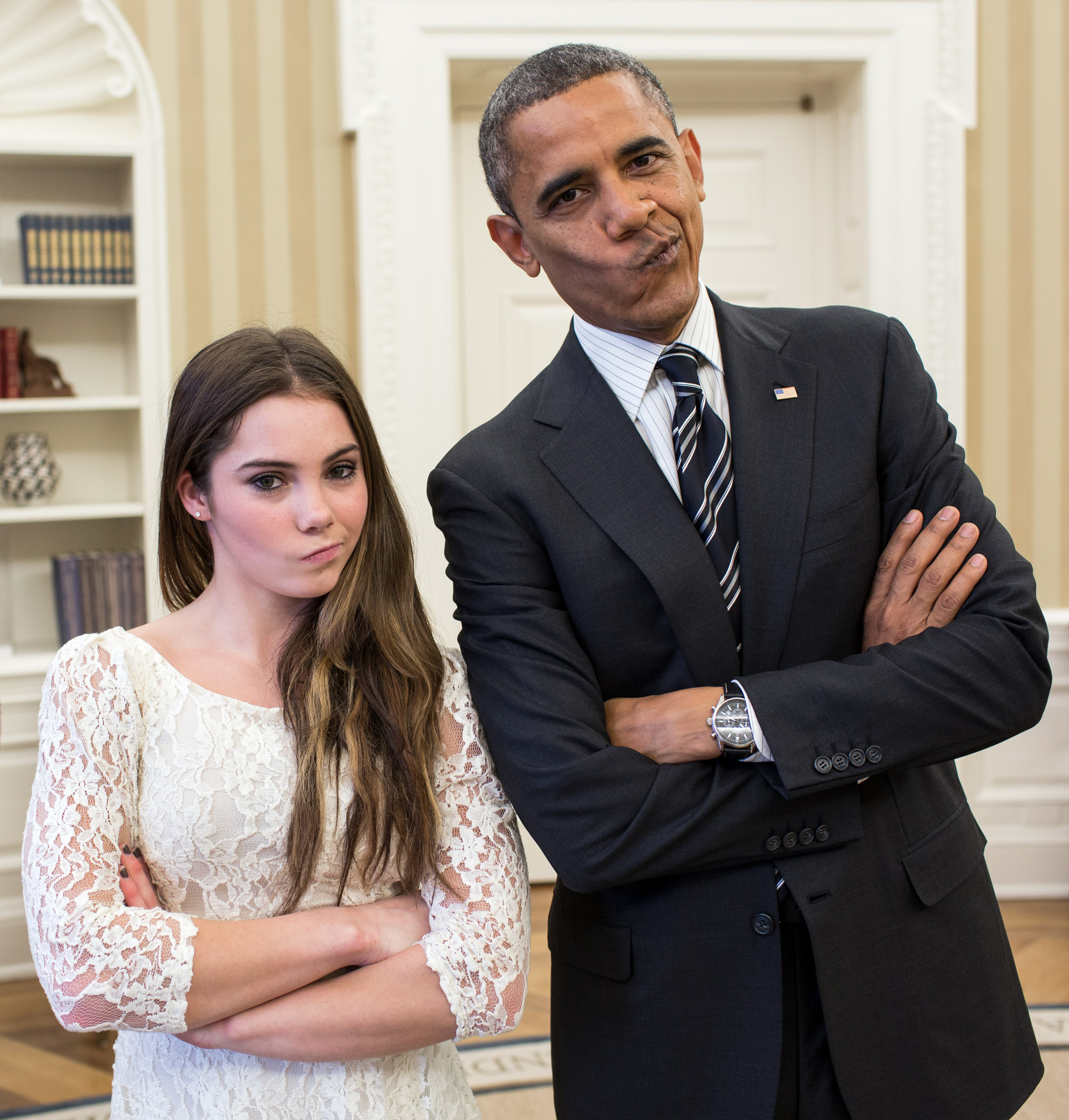
U.S. president Barack Obama mimics Maroney's "not impressed" look in the Oval Office

Maroney was the only American to qualify for the vault final. As the defending world champion in this event, she scored 15.866 on her first vault but fell on her second, scored 14.300, and won the silver medal. Her facial expression while standing on the podium became an internet meme known as "McKayla is not impressed".

As the only American in the uneven bars final, Douglas, finished in eighth after making a timing mistake on a full pirouette. In the balance beam, Douglas finished in seventh after falling. Raisman initially received a score of 14.966, which would have left her in fourth place. However, her coach inquired about the difficulty being too low, and the judges accepted and raised her difficulty score by one-tenth of a point. Her 15.066 matched Romanian Cătălina Ponor for third place, and this time, Raisman won the execution-score tie-breaker to earn the bronze medal.

In the floor final, Raisman won the gold medal with a score of 15.600, four-tenths ahead of the second-place Ponor. Raisman became the first American woman to win the gold medal on the floor, and with her third medal overall, she was the most decorated member of the Fierce Five during the Olympics. Wieber finished seventh in the event.

Event finals for the Fierce Five at the 2012 Summer Olympics
Gymnast	Vault (gymnastics)	Uneven bars	Balance beam	Floor (gymnastics)
Gabby Douglas		14.900 (8)	13.633 (7)	
McKayla Maroney	15.083 (2)			
Aly Raisman			15.066 (3)	15.600 (1)
Jordyn Wieber				14.500 (7)

== Post-Olympics ==
In the week after the Olympic Games, the Fierce Five appeared on The Today Show and Late Show with David Letterman. They also rang the closing bell at the New York Stock Exchange. In September, they appeared at the MTV Video Music Awards. The Fierce Five members were among those who performed in the 40-city Kellogg's Tour of Gymnastics Champions, which started in September. In November, they met U.S. President Barack Obama at the White House and performed on Dancing with the Stars in support of former gymnast Shawn Johnson. In December, Gabby Douglas was named the Associated Press female athlete of the year. Aly Raisman was a contestant on season 16 of Dancing with the Stars and finished in fourth place. The group was nominated for Best Team at the 2013 ESPY Awards, and Douglas and Raisman were also nominated for individual awards. In August 2013, the team was inducted into the USA Gymnastics Hall of Fame.

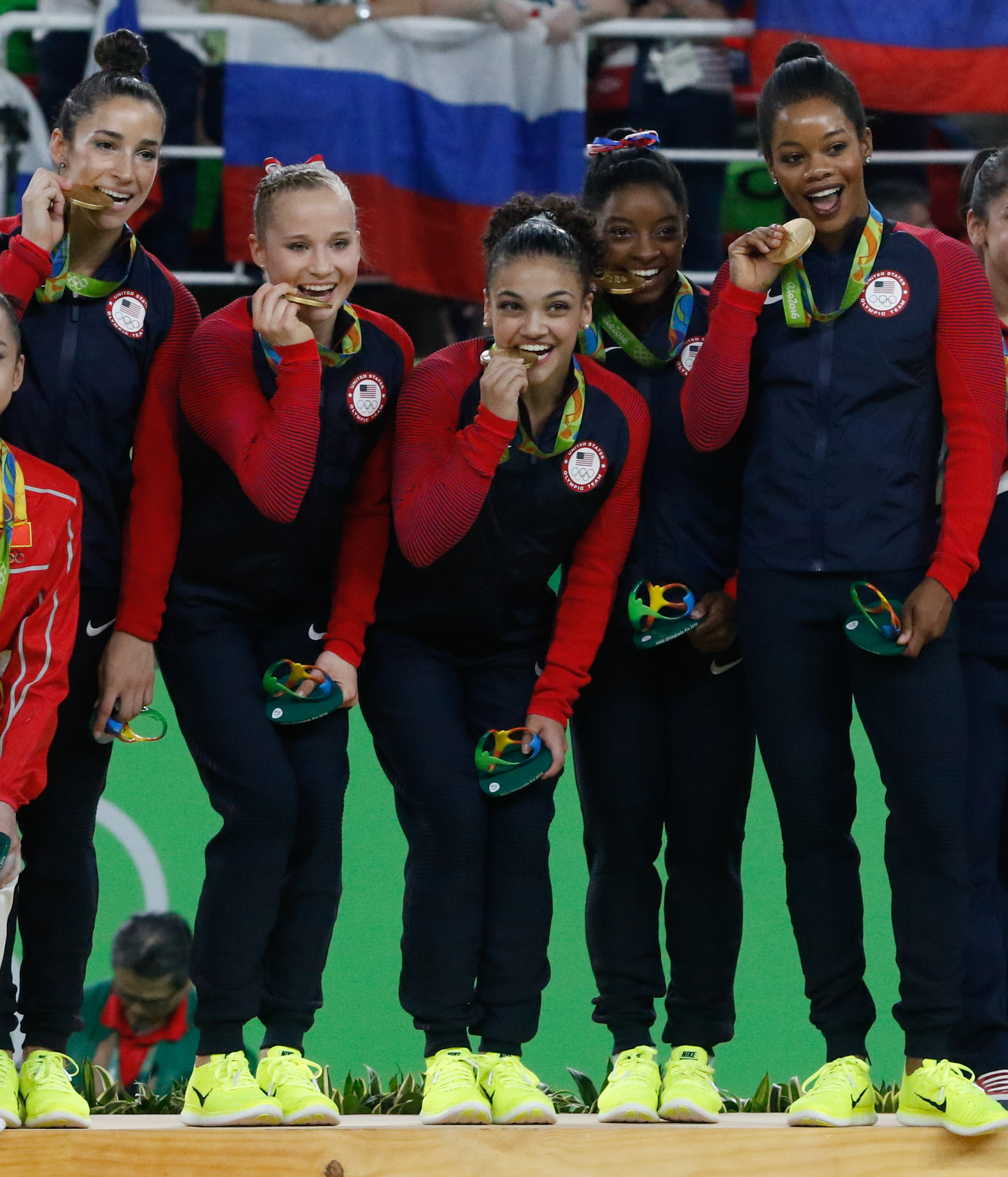
Raisman (left) and Douglas (right) at the 2016 Summer Olympics

Jordyn Wieber did not return to competition after the 2012 Olympics and announced her retirement in 2015. She began her gymnastics coaching career as a volunteer assistant coach for UCLA and became the head coach for Arkansas in 2019.

Maroney and Ross both returned to competition in 2013. At the 2013 World Championships, Maroney successfully defended her World vault title while Ross won silver medals in the all-around, uneven bars, and balance beam. While this would be Maroney's last competition due to injuries and burnout, Ross later competed at the 2014 World Championships and won a gold medal with the team and a bronze medal in the all-around. She struggled in domestic competitions throughout the 2015 season and withdrew from the 2015 Worlds Selection Camp. Ross announced her retirement from elite gymnastics in the beginning of 2016, opting to focus on competing at the collegiate level for UCLA; Maroney retired days later.

Raisman and Douglas returned to training in 2014 and were re-added to the national team in November. They were both part of the gold medal-winning teams at the 2015 World Championships and the 2016 Summer Olympics. The 2016 Olympics were Raisman's final competition, and she confirmed her retirement in 2020. Douglas returned to competition after an eight-year hiatus in 2024, but she withdrew from the 2024 U.S. Championships due to ankle injury. She has stated she will continue training for the 2028 Olympic Games.

All five women later came forward as survivors of Larry Nassar's systematic sexual abuse. During Nassar's 2018 sentencing hearing, Raisman and Wieber delivered victim impact statements while Maroney provided a written statement. Maroney and Raisman testified to the U.S. Senate in 2021 on the FBI's handling of the Nassar case.

== See also ==
- Women's artistic gymnastics events at the 2012 Summer Olympics
- Magnificent Seven, the U.S. 1996 Summer Olympics women's artistic gymnastics team, who won the first team all-around gold medal
- Final Five, the U.S. 2016 Summer Olympics women's artistic gymnastics team, who won the third team all-around gold medal
- Golden Girls, the U.S. 2024 Summer Olympics women's artistic gymnastics team, who won the fourth team all-around gold medal
