= Hezly Rivera =

American artistic gymnast (born 2008)

- Rivera at the 2026 U.S. National Championships

Personal information
- Full name: Hezly Esther Rivera
- Nickname: Hez
- Born: June 4, 2008 (age 18) Hackensack, New Jersey, U.S.

Gymnastics career
- Discipline: Women's artistic gymnastics
- Country represented: United States; (2022–present)
- College team: LSU Tigers (2027–30)
- Gym: WOGA
- Head coach: Valeri Liukin
- Assistant coach: Anna Liukin
- Former coach: Renard Franklin
Medal record
Women's artistic gymnastics
Representing the United States
Olympic Games
Gold medal – first place	2024 Paris	Team
World Championships
Silver medal – second place	2026 Rotterdam	Team
Pan American Championships
Gold medal – first place	2025 Panama City	Team
Gold medal – first place	2026 Rio de Janeiro	Team
Bronze medal – third place	2025 Panama City	All-around
Bronze medal – third place	2025 Panama City	Balance beam
Junior World Championships
Silver medal – second place	2023 Antalya	Team
Silver medal – second place	2023 Antalya	Floor Exercise

Hezly Esther Rivera OLY (born June 4, 2008) is an American artistic gymnast. She was a member of the gold medal-winning team at the 2024 Olympic Games, nicknamed the "Golden Girls", and was the youngest athlete on Team USA at the 2024 Olympics. Additionally, she is the reigning two-time (2025, 2026) U.S. national champion, the 2023 junior U.S. national champion, and a silver medalist with the U.S. team and on floor exercise at the 2023 Junior World Championships.

== Early life ==
Rivera was born in Hackensack, New Jersey, in 2008 to Heidy Ruiz and Henry Rivera, an engineer originally from the Dominican Republic. She was raised in nearby Oradell and has two siblings, older sister Carhelis and younger brother Hanly. She began gymnastics in 2013 after attending a friend's birthday party that was held in a gymnastics facility. Rivera started her gymnastics career at ENA in Paramus under Craig Zappa. She then briefly trained under Maggie Haney until 2020, when her family moved to Texas to train under Valeri Liukin. She attended an online high school.

== Junior gymnastics career ==
=== 2022 ===
Rivera competed at the 2022 Winter Cup where she placed third in the all-around. As a result, she was selected to compete at the DTB Pokal Team Challenge. While there, she helped the USA win gold.

In July, Rivera competed at the U.S. Classic where she finished second in the all-around behind Jayla Hang. Additionally she won gold on balance beam, silver on floor exercise, and finished fourth on vault. The following month Rivera competed at the National Championships where she finished sixth in the all-around and won bronze on floor exercise.

=== 2023 ===
Rivera competed at the 2023 Winter Cup where she won the all-around competition. Additionally she placed first on balance beam and floor exercise. As a result, on winning the competition, Rivera was named to the team to compete at the 2023 Junior World Championships.

On the first day of the Junior World Championships, Rivera helped the U.S. finish second behind Japan. However, during the vault rotation, Rivera's hand slipped on the vaulting table resulting in her scoring a 0 on the apparatus; therefore, she never qualified for the all-around final. She did qualify for the uneven bars and floor exercise finals. During event finals, Rivera placed eighth on uneven bars; she won silver on floor exercise behind Italian Giulia Perotti.

== Senior gymnastics career ==
=== 2024 ===
At 15, Rivera became age-eligible for senior level competition in 2024. She made her debut at the 2024 Winter Cup where she placed third in the all-around and tied for first on balance beam. She made her international debut at the City of Jesolo Trophy where she helped the U.S. win bronze behind Italy and Brazil. At the National Championships, Rivera placed sixth in the all-around. As a result she qualified to the Olympic Trials.

At the Olympic Trials, Rivera placed fifth in the all-around, tied for first on balance beam, fourth on uneven bars, and eighth on floor exercise. As a result she was selected to represent the United States at the 2024 Summer Olympics alongside Simone Biles, Jade Carey, Jordan Chiles, and Sunisa Lee.

During the qualification round at the Olympics, Rivera competed on the uneven bars and balance beam. During the team final, Hezly did not compete but still won a gold medal as the team placed first. Following the Olympics, Rivera took part in the Gold Over America Tour. In September, Rivera verbally committed to compete for the LSU Tigers.

=== 2025 ===
Rivera returned to competition at the 2025 Winter Cup, where she only competed on balance beam; she finished ninth. In May Rivera was selected to compete at the 2025 Pan American Championships alongside Dulcy Caylor, Jayla Hang, Gabrielle Hardie, Tiana Sumanasekera, and alternate Alessia Rosa. On the first day of competition, she won bronze in the all-around behind compatriot Hang and Lia Monica Fontaine of Canada; additionally she qualified to the balance beam final in first place. During the team final, Rivera contributed scores on all four apparatuses towards the United States' first place finish. During the balance beam event final, she won bronze behind Lia Redick and Hang.

At the 2025 U.S. Classic, Rivera competed in all four events, finishing in a tie for twelfth place after two falls on balance beam and uneven bars, but earned second place on floor exercise. She would go on to win all-around title at the National Championships, finishing 0.8 points over runner-up Leanne Wong, and also became national champion on uneven bars (shared with Skye Blakely), balance beam, and floor exercise. In winning the senior national championship title, Rivera became the first person to win both a USA Gymnastics National Championships title at both the junior and senior level since Jordyn Wieber did so in 2008 (junior) and 2011 (senior). Rivera announced that she rolled her ankle days before the selection camp for the 2025 World Championships and would therefore be unable to contend for a spot on the squad.

=== 2026 ===
Rivera began the season at the 2026 Winter Cup, where she took first place in the all-around, balance beam, and floor exercise events. She also won silver on uneven bars behind Charleigh Bullock. Following the competition, Rivera was named to the 2026 Women's Senior National Team. She was also selected to represent the USA at the 2026 American Cup, alongside Bullock and Claire Pease.

Rivera competing at the 2026 National Championships

At the 2026 American Cup, Rivera, Pease, and Bullock competed for the United States alongside Asher Hong, Yul Moldauer, and Danila Leykin. Rivera performed routines on balance beam and floor exercise, contributing to the USA's silver-medal finish.

On May 16, 2026, Rivera was selected to represent the United States at the 2026 Pan American Championships. At the competition she only competed on vault, performing a downgraded Yurchenko full opposed to her usual double. USA Gymnastics later revealed that Rivera had been managing a sore hamstring that was aggravated during vault, causing her to withdraw from the remainder of the competition. Despite this, Rivera and team USA still won team gold.

In August, she competed at the 2026 U.S. Championships where she won the all-around title for the second consecutive year. She also won the national title on balance beam, as well as silver on floor exercise.

In October she was selected to compete at the 2026 World Championships alongside Pease, Bullock, Skye Blakely and Reese Esponda. She medically withdrew from the World Championships competition before team qualifications, and Dulcy Caylor was added to the roster in her place. The United States won silver in the team competition, and Rivera was awarded a medal as a participating member.

== Competitive history ==
Competitive history of Hezly Rivera at the junior level
Year	Event	Team	AA	VT	UB	BB	FX
2022	Winter Cup		3rd place, bronze medalist(s)	8	6	11	6
2022	DTB Pokal Team Challenge	1st place, gold medalist(s)					
2022	U.S. Classic		2nd place, silver medalist(s)	4	11	1st place, gold medalist(s)	2nd place, silver medalist(s)
2022	U.S. National Championships		6	11	6	12	3rd place, bronze medalist(s)
2023	Winter Cup		1st place, gold medalist(s)	4	7	1st place, gold medalist(s)	1st place, gold medalist(s)
2023	Junior World Championships	2nd place, silver medalist(s)			8		2nd place, silver medalist(s)
2023	U.S. Classic				6	20	
2023	U.S. National Championships		1st place, gold medalist(s)	5	1st place, gold medalist(s)	1st place, gold medalist(s)	15

Competitive history of Hezly Rivera at the senior level
Year	Event	Team	AA	VT	UB	BB	FX
2024	Winter Cup		3rd place, bronze medalist(s)		20	1st place, gold medalist(s)	3rd place, bronze medalist(s)
2024	City of Jesolo Trophy	3rd place, bronze medalist(s)	9			4	
2024	U.S. Classic		24		28	26	29
2024	U.S. National Championships		6		5	4	13
2024	Olympic Trials		5		4	1st place, gold medalist(s)	8
2024	Olympic Games	1st place, gold medalist(s)					
2025	Winter Cup					9	
2025	Pan American Championships	1st place, gold medalist(s)	3rd place, bronze medalist(s)			3rd place, bronze medalist(s)	
2025	U.S. Classic		12		23	15	2nd place, silver medalist(s)
2025	U.S. National Championships		1st place, gold medalist(s)		1st place, gold medalist(s)	1st place, gold medalist(s)	1st place, gold medalist(s)
2026	Winter Cup		1st place, gold medalist(s)		2nd place, silver medalist(s)	1st place, gold medalist(s)	1st place, gold medalist(s)
2026	American Cup	2nd place, silver medalist(s)					
2026	Pan American Championships	1st place, gold medalist(s)					
2026	U.S. National Championships		1st place, gold medalist(s)		9	1st place, gold medalist(s)	2nd place, silver medalist(s)
2026	World Championships	(silver) (Note: Rivera was the team USA alternate)					
