= Final Five (gymnastics) =

2016 US Olympic gymnastics team

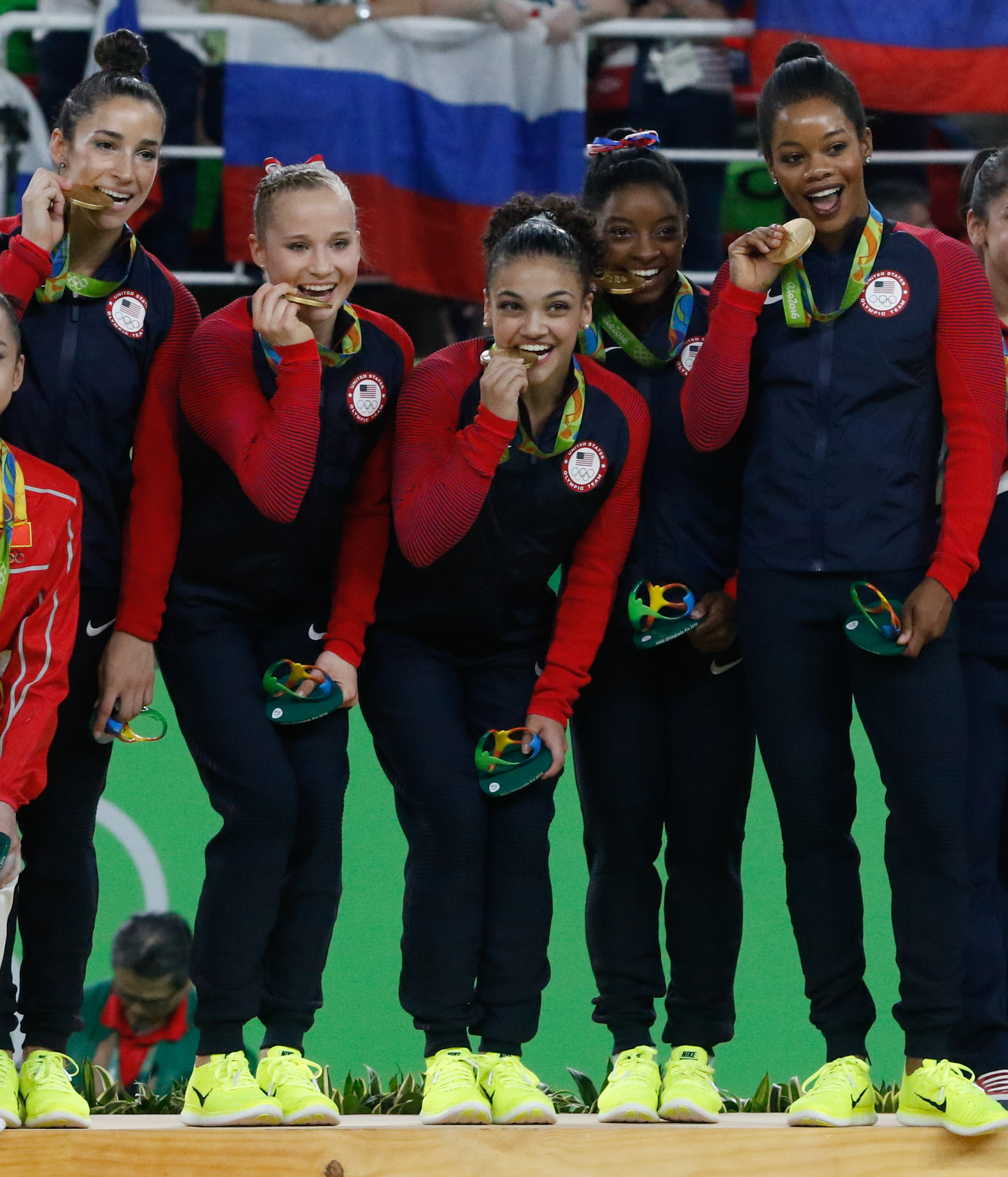
- Left to right: Aly Raisman, Madison Kocian, Laurie Hernandez, Simone Biles, and Gabby Douglas receiving their gold medals

Personal information
- Full name: Simone Biles, Aly Raisman, Laurie Hernandez, Madison Kocian, and Gabby Douglas

Gymnastics career
- Discipline: Women's artistic gymnastics
- Country represented: United States
Medal record
Representing United States
Olympic Games
Gold medal – first place	2016 Rio de Janeiro	Team
Gold medal – first place	2016 Rio de Janeiro	All-around
Gold medal – first place	2016 Rio de Janeiro	Vault
Gold medal – first place	2016 Rio de Janeiro	Floor exercise
Silver medal – second place	2016 Rio de Janeiro	All-around
Silver medal – second place	2016 Rio de Janeiro	Uneven bars
Silver medal – second place	2016 Rio de Janeiro	Balance beam
Silver medal – second place	2016 Rio de Janeiro	Floor exercise
Bronze medal – third place	2016 Rio de Janeiro	Balance beam

The Final Five was the United States women's team in artistic gymnastics that won the team event at the 2016 Summer Olympics in Rio de Janeiro. It was the United States' third gold medal in the event after 2012 and 1996. The five members of the team were Simone Biles, Gabby Douglas, Laurie Hernandez, Madison Kocian, and Aly Raisman, with MyKayla Skinner, Ragan Smith, and Ashton Locklear serving as the three alternates. After the team event, Biles won a gold medal in the individual all-around event, the vault, and on floor exercise and won a bronze on the balance beam, while Raisman won silver medals in the individual all-around, and on the floor exercise, where she was the defending champion, Hernandez won silver on the balance beam, and Kocian won a silver in the uneven bars. As of 2024, the Final Five is the most decorated American Olympic gymnastics team with nine medals total.

== Team background ==
Aly Raisman and Gabby Douglas were both part of the gold medal-winning team, dubbed the Fierce Five, at the 2012 London Olympics, where Douglas won gold in the all-around and Raisman won gold on the floor event and bronze on the balance beam.

Simone Biles became age-eligible for senior competitions in 2013, and she won gold at the 2013 World Championships in the individual all-around and on floor exercise. She also won silver on the vault and bronze on the balance beam. Biles and Madison Kocian were part of the 2014 World Championship gold medal-winning team. Biles additionally won gold medals in the all-around, on the floor exercise, and on the balance beam, becoming the first American woman to win four gold medals in a single World Championships. Raisman and Douglas returned to training in 2014 and were re-added to the national team in November.

Biles, Raisman, Douglas, and Kocian were all part of the 2015 World Championship gold medal-winning team. Biles won gold in the all-around and Douglas won the silver. Biles also won gold medals on the floor exercise and balance beam and won the bronze medal on the vault. With ten gold medals total, Biles broke the record for most World Championships gold medals by a female gymnast. Kocian won gold on the uneven bars in a historic four-way tie.

Laurie Hernandez was the 2015 junior national all-around champion and became age-eligible for senior competitions in 2016. She made her international debut at the 2016 City of Jesolo Trophy alongside Douglas and Raisman, where the American team won the gold medal by over 13 points ahead of Brazil. At the 2016 Pacific Rim Championships, Biles, Hernandez, and Raisman helped the American team win the gold medal, and they all finished in the top three in the all-around.

Raisman won the all-around title at the 2016 U.S. Classic, while Biles, Douglas, Hernandez, and Kocian did not compete on all four apparatuses. Then, at the National Championships, Biles won her fourth straight national all-around title in addition to winning the vault, balance beam, and floor exercise titles. Raisman placed second, Hernandez placed third, Douglas placed fourth, and Kocian placed fifth in the all-around.

== Olympic Trials ==
The Olympic Trials for women's artistic gymnastics took place on Friday, July 8, and Sunday, July 10, 2016, at the SAP Center in San Jose, California. Both nights of the competition were broadcast by NBC.

As the top four in the all-around at the U.S. Championships, Biles, Douglas, Hernandez, and Raisman were considered "locks" for the Olympic team heading into the Olympic Trials, with the competition for the fifth spot being between uneven bars standouts Kocian and Ashton Locklear. Biles, Hernandez, and Raisman finished first, second, and third, respectively, in the all-around and were all selected for the Olympic team. Douglas fell off the balance beam both nights of the competition and finished seventh in the all-around. The U.S. National Team Coordinator, Márta Károlyi, explained that Douglas was still selected for the Olympic team because of her strength on the uneven bars and her ability to improve during the nine-day training camp before the Olympics. Kocian finished eighth in the all-around but beat Locklear to win the uneven bars, leading to her selection for the Olympic team. Locklear, MyKayla Skinner, and Ragan Smith were selected as the three alternates.

Olympic Trials results for the Final Five
Gymnast	Day	Vault (gymnastics)	Uneven bars	Balance beam	Floor (gymnastics)	Total
Simone Biles	1	16.000	14.950	15.200	15.700	61.850
Simone Biles	2	16.200	14.900	14.750	15.550	61.400
Simone Biles	Total	32.200 (1)	29.850 (=4)	29.950 (4)	31.250 (1)	123.250 (1)
Laurie Hernandez	1	15.150	14.900	15.500	15.300	60.850
Laurie Hernandez	2	15.150	14.750	15.700	14.700	60.300
Laurie Hernandez	Total	30.300 (4)	29.650 (7)	31.200 (1)	30.000 (3)	121.150 (2)
Aly Raisman	1	15.250	14.450	14.800	15.450	59.950
Aly Raisman	2	15.200	14.300	15.250	15.050	59.800
Aly Raisman	Total	30.450 (3)	28.750 (11)	30.050 (3)	30.500 (2)	119.750 (3)
Gabby Douglas	1	15.100	15.100	13.700	14.650	58.550
Gabby Douglas	2	15.000	15.250	14.100	14.550	58.900
Gabby Douglas	Total	30.100 (6)	30.350 (3)	27.800 (11)	29.200 (=6)	117.450 (7)
Madison Kocian	1	13.900	15.750	14.700	14.250	58.600
Madison Kocian	2	14.000	15.900	13.850	14.700	58.450
Madison Kocian	Total	27.900 (12)	31.650 (1)	28.550 (9)	28.950 (9)	117.050 (8)

== Captain and nickname ==
Aly Raisman, the captain of the Fierce Five and the oldest member of the Final Five at 22 years old, was once again selected as team captain by her teammates.

The team members chose the name "Final Five" before the Olympic Games, but it was not announced until the team had secured victory in the team event. The name has two meanings: one being that at the upcoming 2020 Olympic Games, gymnastics teams would only be made up of four athletes, (Note: Olympic gymnastics team sizes were changed back to five for 2024 Olympic Games.) and the other being that it was the final gymnastics team to be formed under Márta Károlyi as national team coordinator of USA Gymnastics.

== 2016 Summer Olympics ==
=== Qualifications ===
The United States qualified in first place with an overall score of 185.238, nearly 10 points ahead of second-place China. Biles, Douglas, and Raisman competed on all four apparatuses. Hernandez competed on the vault, balance beam, and floor exercise, and Kocian competed only on the uneven bars. For the individual all-around competition, Biles, Raisman, and Douglas qualified in first, second, and third place, respectively. Due to the rule allowing only the top two from each country to compete in an individual final, only Biles and Raisman advanced.

Biles qualified first on the vault, balance beam, and floor exercise; Kocian qualified first on the uneven bars; Raisman qualified second on the floor exercise; Hernandez qualified second on the balance beam; Douglas qualified third on the uneven bars. Additionally, Douglas and Raisman both finished seventh on the balance beam and Hernandez finished fourth on the floor exercise, but all failed to qualify for those finals due to the two-per-country rule.

Qualification results for the Final Five at the 2016 Summer Olympics
Gymnast	Vault (gymnastics)		Uneven bars		Balance beam		Floor (gymnastics)		Total	
Gymnast	Score (Note: Gymnasts who wanted to qualify for the vault final performed a second vault, with the average of the two counting for event final qualification. Only the first vault counted for individual and team all-around qualification.)	Rank	Score	Rank	Score	Rank	Score	Rank	Score	Rank
Simone Biles	16.000/16.100; Avg: 16.050	1	15.000	14	15.633	1	15.733	1	62.366	1
Gabby Douglas	15.166		15.766	3	14.833	=7	14.366	9	60.131	3
Laurie Hernandez	15.200				15.366	2	14.800	4		
Madison Kocian			15.866	1						
Aly Raisman	15.766		14.733	22	14.833	=7	15.275	2	60.607	2
United States	46.966	1	46.632	2	45.832	1	45.808	1	185.238	1

=== Team final ===
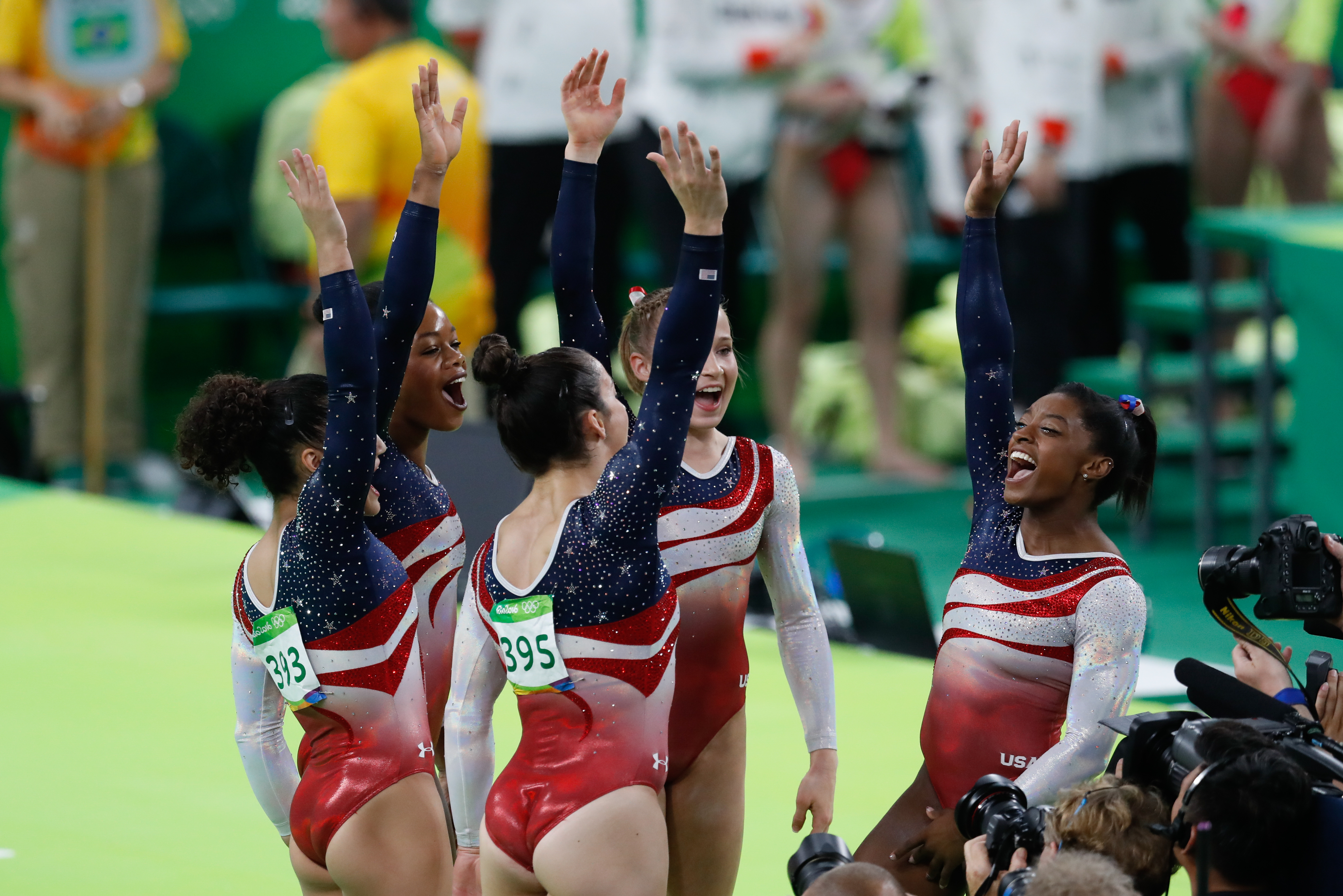
The Final Five celebrating after winning the women's team all-around at the 2016 Summer Olympics

In the team final, Biles competed on all four apparatus, Raisman and Hernandez both competed on the vault, balance beam, and floor exercise, and Kocian and Douglas competed on the uneven bars. The team scored 184.897, over eight points ahead of second-place Russia, and they had the highest total scores on each apparatus. This was the largest margin of victory in an Olympic women's gymnastics team final since 1960 when the Soviet Union beat Czechoslovakia by nearly nine points. This was the United States' second consecutive Olympic team title and its third overall.

Team final results for the Final Five at the 2016 Summer Olympics
Gymnast	Vault (gymnastics)	Uneven bars	Balance beam	Floor (gymnastics)	Total
Simone Biles	15.933	14.800	15.300	15.800	61.833
Gabby Douglas		15.766			15.766
Laurie Hernandez	15.100		15.233	14.833	45.166
Madison Kocian		15.933			15.933
Aly Raisman	15.833		15.000	15.366	46.199
United States	46.866 (1)	46.499 (1)	45.533 (1)	45.999 (1)	184.897 (1)

=== Individual all-around ===
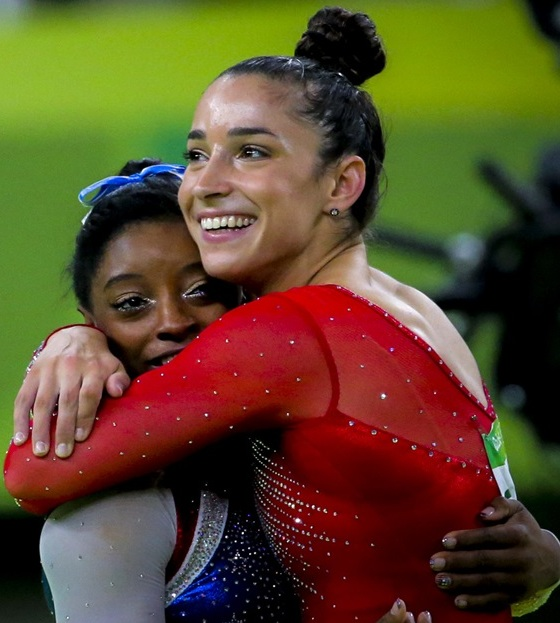
Biles (left) and Raisman (right) celebrating after the all-around final

In the individual all-around final, Biles won the gold medal, over two points ahead of Raisman, who won the silver medal, and over four points ahead of the bronze-medalist Aliya Mustafina of Russia. Biles became the fifth overall and the fourth consecutive American women's Olympic all-around champion, joining Mary Lou Retton (1984), Carly Patterson (2004), Nastia Liukin (2008), and Gabby Douglas (2012). Biles was the first defending world all-around champion to win the Olympic all-around title since Lilia Podkopayeva did so in 1996. Biles and Raisman became the second pair of American gymnasts to go 1-2 in the individual all-around in the Olympics, after Liukin and Shawn Johnson took gold and silver, respectively, in 2008.

Individual all-around final for the Final Five at the 2016 Summer Olympics
Gymnast	Vault (gymnastics)	Uneven bars	Balance beam	Floor (gymnastics)	Total
Simone Biles	15.866	14.966	15.433	15.933	62.198
Aly Raisman	15.633	14.166	14.866	15.433	60.098

=== Event finals ===
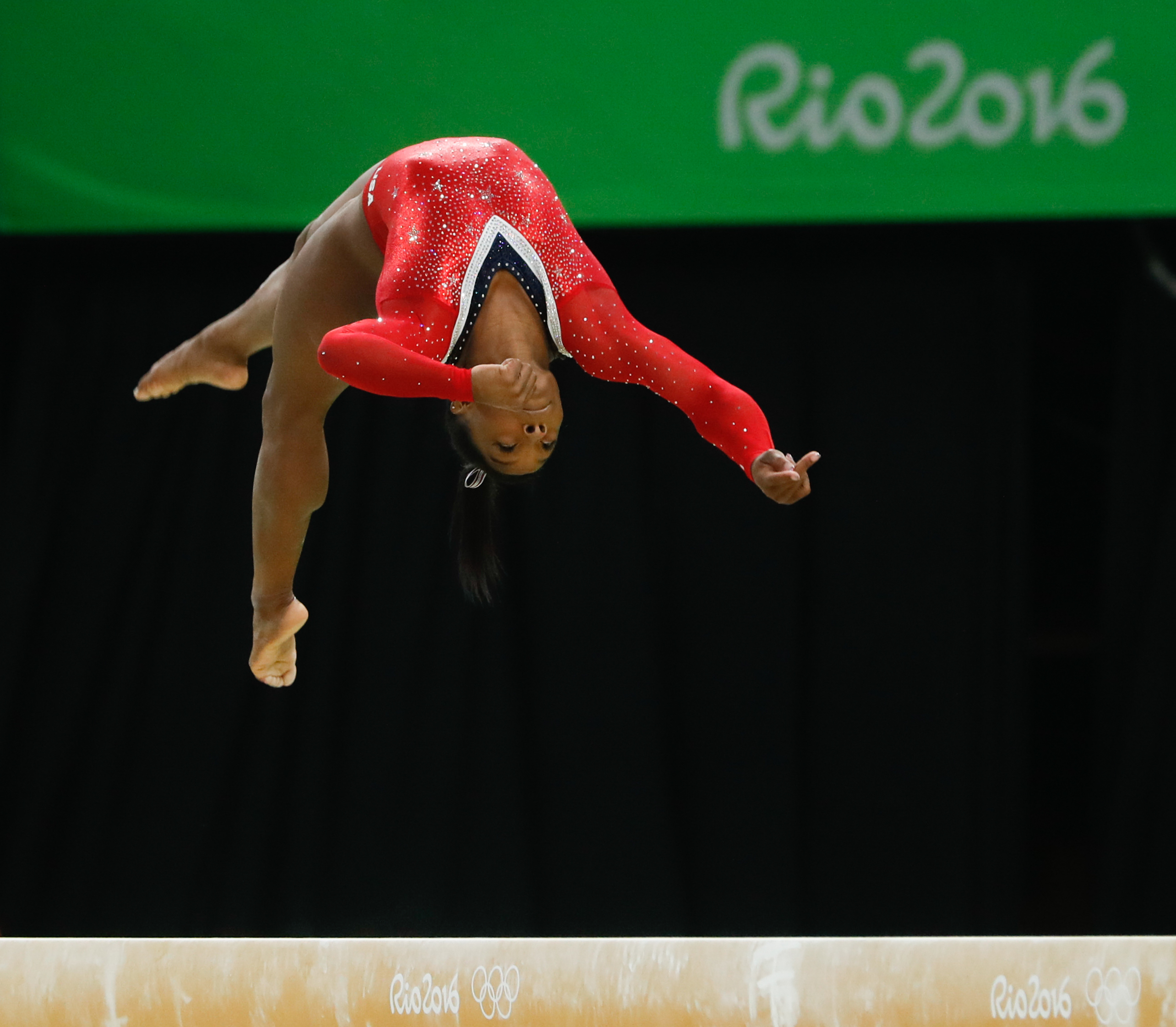
Biles competing in the balance beam final

In the vault final, Biles won her third Olympic gold medal, becoming the first American gymnast to win the vault title at an Olympic Games. This was her 17th medal at the Olympics or World Championships, making her the most decorated American gymnast of all time. After qualifying in first place, Kocian won the silver medal on the uneven bars, finishing only 0.067 behind the reigning Olympic uneven bars champion Aliya Mustafina. Douglas, who qualified in third place behind Kocian and Mustafina, respectively, made a mistake on one of her pirouettes and placed seventh.

In the balance beam final, Hernandez won the silver medal, finishing behind the Netherlands' Sanne Wevers. Biles, who had the highest qualifying score, put her hands on the beam in the final after a balance check on her front tuck. Despite the mistake, her score was high enough to win her the bronze medal. Then in the floor exercise final, Biles won her fourth Olympic gold medal, and Raisman won the silver medal. This was Raisman's sixth Olympic medal, which at the time made her the second most decorated American Olympic gymnast behind Shannon Miller. Biles' four gold medals tied her Larisa Latynina (1956), Věra Čáslavská (1968), and Ecaterina Szabo (1984), for the most gold medals won in a single Olympics by a female gymnast.

Event finals for the Final Five at the 2016 Summer Olympics
Gymnast	Vault (gymnastics)	Uneven bars	Balance beam	Floor (gymnastics)
Simone Biles	15.966		14.733	15.966
Gabby Douglas		15.066		
Laurie Hernandez			15.333	
Madison Kocian		15.833		
Aly Raisman				15.500

Overall, the Final Five won nine Olympic medals, making them the most decorated American gymnastics team in history, as of 2024. Biles was chosen to be the flag bearer for the United States at the closing ceremonies. She was the first American female gymnast to be given the honor.

== Post-Olympics ==
The Final Five appeared on the cover of People Magazine in its August 29, 2016, edition with their Olympic gold medals. The team appeared on The Tonight Show Starring Jimmy Fallon on August 24. Kellogg's made a special edition box of Special K Red Berries featuring the Final Five.

Hernandez competed on season 23 of Dancing with the Stars. She was partnered with Valentin Chmerkovskiy, and she became the youngest winner in the show's history. Biles then competed on season 24 of the show. She was partnered with Sasha Farber, and they finished fourth.

Kocian went on to compete at the collegiate level for the UCLA Bruins. She, along with Fierce Five member Kyla Ross, made history by becoming the first Olympic gold medalists to compete in NCAA gymnastics. She helped the team win the 2018 NCAA Championships. Her career ended during her senior year on March 13, 2020, when all competitions were canceled due to the COVID-19 pandemic in the United States. She confirmed in April 2020 that she was retired and would not return to elite gymnastics.

Raisman never competed again after the 2016 Olympics, and she confirmed her retirement in 2020. Hernandez returned to competition in 2021 but retired after she did not qualify for the postponed 2020 Olympic Games after a knee injury at the U.S. Championships. Douglas returned to competition in 2024, but did not qualify for the 2024 Olympic team after an ankle injury before the U.S. Championships. She has stated she will continue training for the 2028 Olympic Games.

Biles returned to competition in 2018 and competed at the 2018 and 2019 World Championships, becoming the most-decorated female gymnast in World Championship history. She competed at the 2020 Olympic Games, winning a silver medal with the team and a bronze medal on the balance beam after withdrawing from most of the events due to "the twisties". She won four gold medals at the 2023 World Championships and three more gold medals at the 2024 Olympic Games.

After the 2016 Olympics, it came to light that all five of the Final Five, plus team alternate Ashton Locklear, had been abused sexually, verbally, and/or emotionally while training in gymnastics.

== See also ==
- Women's artistic gymnastics events at the 2016 Summer Olympics
- Magnificent Seven, the U.S. 1996 Summer Olympics women's artistic gymnastics team, who won the first team all-around gold medal
- Fierce Five, the U.S. 2012 Summer Olympics women's artistic gymnastics team, who won the second team all-around gold medal
- Golden Girls, the U.S. 2024 Summer Olympics women's artistic gymnastics team, who won the fourth team all-around gold medal
