= Laurie Hernandez =

American artistic gymnast (born 2000)

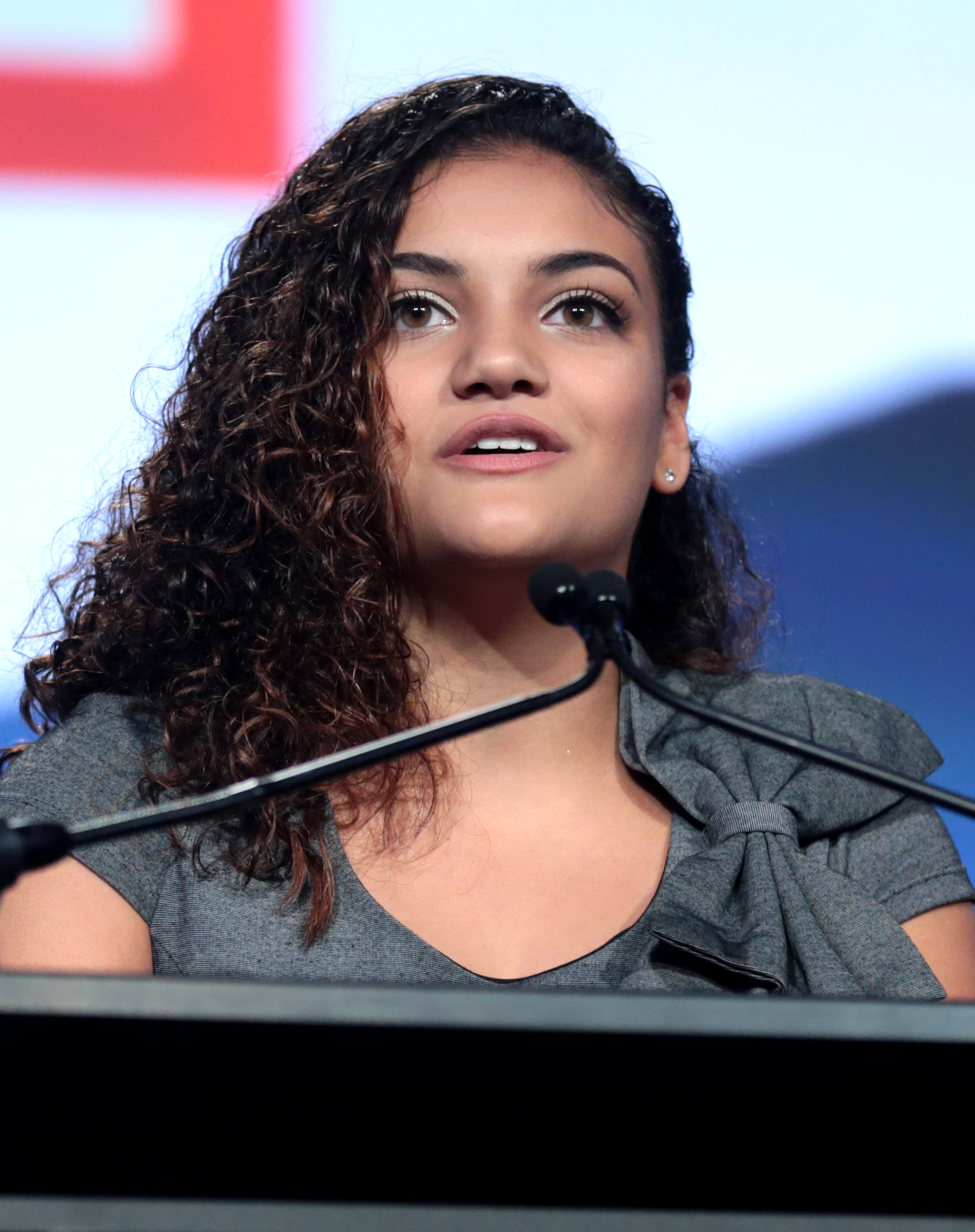
- Hernandez in Phoenix, Arizona, in July 2017

Personal information
- Full name: Lauren Zoe Hernandez
- Nicknames: Laurie, Lo
- Born: June 9, 2000 (age 26) New Brunswick, New Jersey
- Height: 5 ft 1 in (155 cm)

Gymnastics career
- Discipline: Women's artistic gymnastics
- Country represented: United States; (2012–2016)
- Club: Gym-Max Gymnastics (2018–2021); MG Elite (former)
- Head coach: Jenny Liang
- Former coach: Maggie Haney
- Retired: June 6, 2021
Medal record
Representing the United States
Olympic Games
Gold medal – first place	2016 Rio de Janeiro	Team
Silver medal – second place	2016 Rio de Janeiro	Balance beam
Pacific Rim Championships
Gold medal – first place	2016 Everett	Team
- Education: New York University Tisch School of the Arts

Lauren Zoe Hernandez (born June 9, 2000) is an American actress and former artistic gymnast. She was a member of the 2016 U.S. women's Olympic gymnastics team dubbed the "Final Five" that won the team gold medal at the 2016 Summer Olympics. Individually she is the 2016 Olympic balance beam silver medalist.

Outside of gymnastics, Hernandez has appeared on season 23 of Dancing with the Stars in 2016, where she won the competition along with partner Valentin Chmerkovskiy. Hernandez hosted the first season of American Ninja Warrior Junior as the on-course reporter and starred as Valeria in the Nickelodeon animated miniseries Middle School Moguls. She is the author of two books, I Got This: To Gold and Beyond, a New York Times Bestseller, and She's Got This, a children's book. Hernandez made her Broadway debut in the hit musical & Juliet in 2026.

== Early life ==
Hernandez was born on June 9, 2000, in New Brunswick, New Jersey, and is the daughter of Wanda and Anthony Hernandez. Her grandparents moved from Puerto Rico to New York . She has a sister, Jelysa, and a brother, Marcus. She took ballet lessons when she was four, but she asked her parents to switch to gymnastics when she was five. She was homeschooled through the Abeka Academy distance-learning program.

== Gymnastics career ==
=== 2012–2013 ===
At the 2012 National Qualifier held at the Karolyi Ranch, Hernandez won the bronze medal in the all-around behind Veronica Hults and Maggie Nichols, and her scores qualified her for domestic elite competitions. Later that week at the American Classic, she finished eighth in the junior all-around. She then competed at the U.S. Classic, where she placed 11th in the junior division. Through the Classic, she qualified for the U.S. Championships in St. Louis, where she placed 21st after two days of competition.

Hernandez won the silver medal in the all-around at the 2013 WOGA Classic. In June, she competed at the American Classic in Huntsville, Texas. There, she placed first on floor exercise, second in the all-around behind Ariana Agrapides, and third on balance beam and vault. Following a national training camp, in July 2013, she was added to the U.S. junior national team. She then went to Chicago for the U.S. Classic, where she placed sixth all-around and won the floor exercise title. At the National Championships in August, she won the silver medal in the junior all-around competition with a total score of 116.650, behind Bailie Key. She also placed second on uneven bars and floor exercise, and tied for third on beam with Alexis Vasquez.

Hernandez was selected to represent the U.S. at the Junior Japan International in Yokohama in September 2013. She scored 56.750 to win the bronze medal in the all-around. She also took third on vault, fourth on floor exercise, and sixth on balance beam. In November, she competed at the International Junior Mexican Cup in Acapulco alongside Bailie Key, Veronica Hults, and Emily Gaskins, and they won the team gold medal. Individually, Hernandez won the silver medal in the all-around behind Key.

=== 2014–2015 ===
In early 2014, Hernandez fractured her wrist when she slipped off the beam in a training session. Later that year, she dislocated her kneecap and tore her patellar tendon. She resumed training in the fall and attended the final U.S. training camp of the year in November.

Hernandez was named to the U.S. team for the 2015 City of Jesolo Trophy in Jesolo, Italy, where she was crowned junior all-around champion with a score of 57.650, ahead of teammates Norah Flatley and Jazmyn Foberg. In the junior-division event finals, she earned additional gold medals on the uneven bars and the floor exercise. At the U.S. Classic in July, she won the junior all-around title with a score of 58.450, as well as winning vault and uneven bars. She placed third on the balance beam and floor exercise. At the U.S. Championships, she had a score of 57.900 on the first day of competition and 59.550 on the second day, winning the junior all-around title over defending champion Foberg. She also won the title on the uneven bars, a silver medal on the floor exercise, and bronze medals on the balance beam and vault. She was then selected to compete at the 2015 International Junior Japan Meet in Yokohama, where she won the all-around, floor exercise, and vault and won silver medals on balance beam and uneven bars.

=== 2016 ===
Hernandez became age-eligible for senior level competition in 2016 and made her senior debut at the City of Jesolo Trophy, where the U.S. team won the gold medal. Hernandez won the bronze medal in the all-around with a score of 58.550, behind two U.S. teammates, fellow first-year senior Ragan Smith and Gabby Douglas, the 2012 Olympic all-around champion. She also earned a silver medal on the vault behind MyKayla Skinner and a gold medal on the balance beam, ahead of Smith and 2012 Olympian Aly Raisman.

In April, Hernandez competed at the Pacific Rim Gymnastics Championships in Everett, Washington along with Raisman, Smith, three-time world all-around champion Simone Biles, and 2015 World Championships team member Brenna Dowell. She contributed an all-around score of 59.800 toward the American team's first-place finish and placed third individually behind Biles and Raisman, but did not earn the all-around bronze medal because of a rule limiting medals to two gymnasts per country (Japan's Nagi Kajita took bronze instead). Hernandez also qualified for the balance beam final, but USA Gymnastics announced that she and Biles would not compete in event finals in order to rest them before the Olympics.

In June, Hernandez competed at the U.S. Classic on the uneven bars only, scoring 15.400 and placing fourth. Later that month, she competed on all four events at the U.S. Championships. At the end of night one, she was tied for second place in the all-around with Raisman, behind Biles, with a score of 60.450. She finished the two-day competition in third all-around, behind Biles and Raisman. She placed third on uneven bars and balance beam and tied for third on floor exercise with MyKayla Skinner.

At the Olympic trials in early July, Hernandez placed second in the all-around, behind Biles. She was named to the Olympic team alongside Biles, Douglas, Raisman, and Madison Kocian. Hernandez had previously committed to the University of Florida to compete on the Florida Gators gymnastics team in the NCAA. However, she decided to forgo NCAA eligibility and become a professional athlete on August 3, 2016, in the lead-up to the Olympic Games.

==== Rio de Janeiro Olympics ====
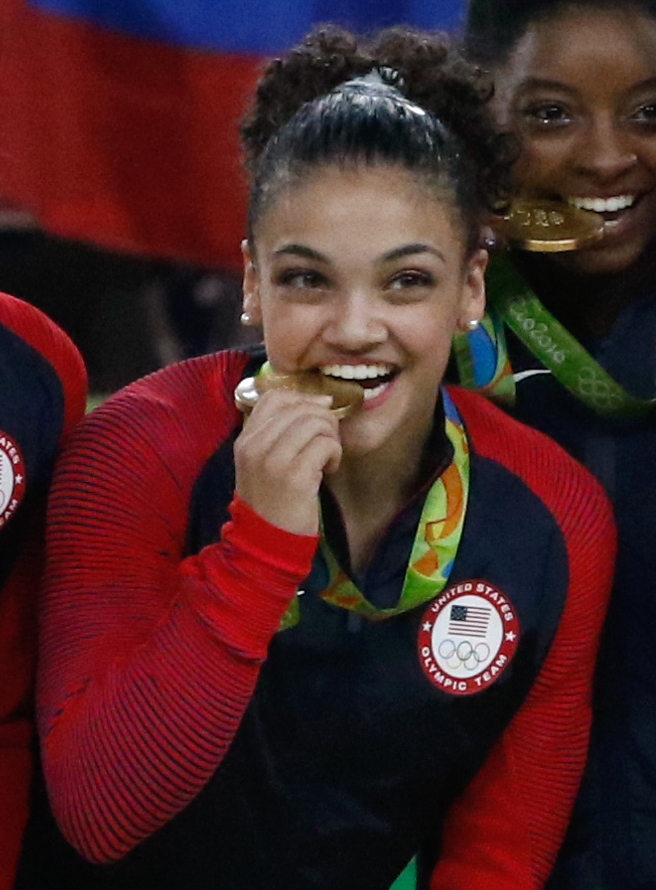
Hernandez at the 2016 Summer Olympics

On August 7, Hernandez competed in the qualification round at the 2016 Summer Olympics. She scored 15.200 on the vault, 15.366 on the balance beam, and 14.800 on the floor exercise, qualifying for the balance beam event final in second place. She posted the fourth highest score on floor, but she did not advance to the final due to the two-per-country rule, with teammates Biles and Raisman getting higher scores. Hernandez did not compete on uneven bars. The United States team finished first in team qualifications, securing a spot in team finals nearly 10 points ahead of the second-place team.

Hernandez and the rest of the United States team, known as the Final Five, won gold in the team final. The Americans won every event, scoring a total of 184.897, more than eight points higher than second-place team Russia (176.688) and third-place team China (176.003). Hernandez was the first competitor on vault and floor exercise for the United States team. She contributed to the overall score with 15.100 on vault, 15.233 on beam, and 14.833 on floor exercise.

Hernandez won a silver medal in the balance beam event final with a score of 15.333. She placed ahead of teammate Simone Biles, who placed third with a score of 14.733, and behind Sanne Wevers of the Netherlands, who won gold with a score of 15.466.

=== Hiatus ===
After the 2016 Olympics, Hernandez took a break from gymnastics to pursue media opportunities and rest her body. She appeared on the television show Dancing with the Stars and won the competition. She continued appearing on television and in the media throughout the next four years, as a show host and voice actor as well as a celebrity guest. She returned to gymnastics training in October 2018, after two years off. Although Hernandez previously trained in New Jersey at MG Elite, for her comeback she chose to switch gymnastics clubs and train at Gym-Max in California with coaches Jenny Zhang and Howie Liang. She was invited to the national team training camp held November 15–18, 2019, after spectating at the U.S. Championships in August and speaking to team coordinator Tom Forster while there.

=== 2020 ===
In January 2020, Hernandez said that she was focusing on meets beginning in late May 2020: the U.S. Classic, U.S. Championships, and U.S. Olympic Trials. Hernandez did not attend the February national team training camp, despite being invited. As the February camp was a selection for spring international meets, Hernandez could not participate in competitions held in March and April 2020. According to team coordinator Tom Forster, Hernandez accepted an invitation to the April camp. However, this training camp and the competitions for the 2020 season were canceled due to the COVID-19 pandemic in the United States.

On April 29, Hernandez's former coach Maggie Haney was suspended by USA Gymnastics for eight years due to abusive conduct. Hernandez testified against Haney at the USA Gymnastics hearing, and posted a message about her experiences on her social media without naming the coach. Haney publicly humiliated Hernandez for her weight, leading Hernandez to binge and purge. She also forced Hernandez to train and compete while injured. In 2020, Hernandez said that she still struggled with depression and disordered eating that began due to Haney's abuse. Within the gymnastics community, Haney's suspension was seen as progress in the aftermath of the USA Gymnastics sex abuse scandal.

=== 2021 ===
In February, Hernandez returned to elite gymnastics competition at the 2021 Winter Cup, competing on two events. Despite competing a downgraded floor routine, Hernandez managed to hit a clean beam routine to finish fifth on the event behind Skye Blakely, Jordan Chiles, Sunisa Lee, and Konnor McClain. Then at the 2021 U.S. Classic, she competed on the vault and balance beam, but she fell off the balance beam. In June, Hernandez was scheduled to compete at the 2021 U.S. Championships. However, she had to withdraw from the competition after hyperextending her left knee in balance beam warm-ups. She was not added to the national team, and she did not qualify to compete at the upcoming Olympic Trials. She later shared that she had a torn meniscus, a bone bruise, and a cyst.

Hernandez participated in Simone Biles' Gold Over America Tour in the fall of 2021. She retired from competition in 2021.

== Television roles and media appearances ==
=== Dancing with the Stars ===
Hernandez was revealed as one of the celebrities competing on season 23 of Dancing with the Stars on August 30, 2016. She was partnered with professional dancer Valentin Chmerkovskiy. The couple won the competition and the Mirrorball Trophy on the episode that aired November 22, 2016. At 16, Hernandez was the show's youngest winner.

In November 2017, Hernandez returned to the 25th season in week eight, to participate in a trio jive with Victoria Arlen and Chmerkovskiy.

Week #	Dance/Song	Judges' scores				Result	Ref.
Week #	Dance/Song	Inaba	Goodman	Hough	Tonioli	Result	Ref.
1	Cha-cha-cha / "American Girl"	8	8	7	8	No elimination	
2	Jive / "DuckTales"	8	8	8	8	Safe	
3	Tango / "Into the Sunset"	7	8	8	8	Safe (Immunity)	
4	Jazz / "The Way You Make Me Feel"	10	10	10	10	Safe	
5	Paso doble / "Rise"	8	9	9	8	No elimination	
6	Salsa / "Light It Up"	9	9	9	10	Safe	
7	Quickstep / "One Fine Day"; Team Freestyle / "Embrace"	8; 8	8; 9	9; 9	9; 9	Safe	
8	Viennese waltz / "Pure Imagination"	10	10	10	10	Safe	
9	Argentine tango / "Cell Block Tango"; Contemporary / "Bird Set Free"	10; 10	10; 10	10; 10	10; 10	Safe	
10; Semifinals	Foxtrot / "Hollow"; Samba / "Magalenha"	10; 10	10; 10	10; 10	10; 10	Safe	
11; Finals	Paso doble / "Wicked Ones"; Freestyle / "Brand New"; Fusion (Argentine tango + Foxtrot) / "We Are the Ones"	9; 10; 10	10; 10; 10	9; 10; 10	10; 10; 10	Winner	

=== Other television roles ===
Hernandez was the on-course reporter for the first season of American Ninja Warrior Junior. In 2019, she starred with Daniella Perkins and Jade Pettyjohn in the Nickelodeon animated mini-series Middle School Moguls, voicing a character named Valeria. Hernandez was one of five gymnasts featured on the Peacock docuseries Golden: The Journey of USA's Elite Gymnasts. Despite not making the 2020 Olympic team, she still traveled to Tokyo as a commentator for NBC. She guest starred as herself in an episode of the Disney Channel sitcom Stuck in the Middle and alongside Dominique Dawes and Gabby Douglas in an episode airing in 2023 of the second season of the Disney+ animated series The Proud Family: Louder and Prouder.

Hernandez provided color commentary for NBC's live daytime coverage of the women's artistic gymnastics events at the 2024 Summer Olympics. She discussed having imposter syndrome before the 2024 Summer Olympics and was praised for "her enthusiastic, insightful and down-to-earth" commentary. For her work as an event analyst, Hernandez won a Sports Emmy Award for Outstanding Live Special – Championship Event.

=== Other appearances and books ===
On November 24, 2016, she appeared on the 90th anniversary of the Macy's Thanksgiving Day Parade, riding the Spirit of America float. Then in 2017, she was the special guest narrator for the Candlelight Processional at Epcot Center in Disney World. She was a Grand Marshal of the 2020 Rose Parade.

Hernandez released her book I Got This: To Gold and Beyond on January 24, 2017. In 2018, Hernandez published a similar children's book titled She's Got This, with illustrations by Nina Mata.

== Theatre career ==
Hernandez made her Broadway debut in & Juliet in 2026. She joined the ensemble cast in the featured dance role of Charmion for a limited engagement. In August 2026, it was announced that Hernandez would join the Off-Broadway revival of The 25th Annual Putnam County Spelling Bee starting September 7, 2026, in the role of Logainne Schwartzandgrubenierre.

== Personal life ==
Hernandez has been dating fellow gymnast Charlotte Drury since December 2020. She started attending New York University Tisch School of the Arts in 2023 and graduated in May 2026.

== Competitive history ==
Competition history for Laurie Hernandez at the junior level
Year	Event	Team	AA	VT	UB	BB	FX
2012	National Qualifier		3rd place, bronze medalist(s)	13	6	1st place, gold medalist(s)	1st place, gold medalist(s)
2012	American Classic		8	10	8	2nd place, silver medalist(s)	6
2012	U.S. Classic		11	10	23	7	6
2012	U.S. Championships		21	19	19	21	17
2013	WOGA Classic		2nd place, silver medalist(s)	4	3rd place, bronze medalist(s)	4	9
2013	American Classic		2nd place, silver medalist(s)	3rd place, bronze medalist(s)	7	3rd place, bronze medalist(s)	1st place, gold medalist(s)
2013	U.S. Classic		6	8	8	16	1st place, gold medalist(s)
2013	U.S. Championships		2nd place, silver medalist(s)	5	2nd place, silver medalist(s)	3rd place, bronze medalist(s)	2nd place, silver medalist(s)
2013	Japan Junior International		3rd place, bronze medalist(s)	3rd place, bronze medalist(s)		6	4
2013	Junior Mexican Cup	1st place, gold medalist(s)	2nd place, silver medalist(s)				
2015	City of Jesolo Trophy	1st place, gold medalist(s)	1st place, gold medalist(s)		1st place, gold medalist(s)		1st place, gold medalist(s)
2015	U.S. Classic		1st place, gold medalist(s)	1st place, gold medalist(s)	1st place, gold medalist(s)	3rd place, bronze medalist(s)	3rd place, bronze medalist(s)
2015	U.S. Championships		1st place, gold medalist(s)	3rd place, bronze medalist(s)	1st place, gold medalist(s)	3rd place, bronze medalist(s)	2nd place, silver medalist(s)
2015	Japan Junior International		1st place, gold medalist(s)	1st place, gold medalist(s)	2nd place, silver medalist(s)	2nd place, silver medalist(s)	1st place, gold medalist(s)

Competition history for Laurie Hernandez at the senior level
Year	Event	Team	AA	VT	UB	BB	FX
2016	City of Jesolo Trophy	1st place, gold medalist(s)	3rd place, bronze medalist(s)	2nd place, silver medalist(s)		1st place, gold medalist(s)	
2016	Pacific Rim Championships	1st place, gold medalist(s)					
2016	U.S. Classic				4		
2016	U.S. Championships		3rd place, bronze medalist(s)		3rd place, bronze medalist(s)	3rd place, bronze medalist(s)	3rd place, bronze medalist(s)
2016	Olympic Trials		2nd place, silver medalist(s)	4	7	1st place, gold medalist(s)	3rd place, bronze medalist(s)
2016	Olympic Games	1st place, gold medalist(s)				2nd place, silver medalist(s)	
2017	Did not compete						
2018	Did not compete						
2019	Did not compete						
2020	Did not compete						
2021	Winter Cup					5	13
2021	U.S. Classic					22	
2021	U.S. Championships		WD				

== Acting credits ==
=== Television ===
Year	Title	Role	Notes	Ref.
2016	Dancing with the Stars	Herself	Contestant on Season 23	
2017	Stuck in the Middle	Herself	1 episode	
2018	Sesame Street	Herself	Cameo on Season 48	
2018	Celebrity Family Feud	Herself	Summer 2018 Season	
2018	American Ninja Warrior Junior	Herself	Co-Host	
2019	Middle School Moguls	Valeria	Main voice role	
2020	Blue's Clues & You!	Herself	Episode: "Happy Birthday, Blue!"	
2021	Golden: The Journey of USA's Elite Gymnasts	Herself	Peacock docuseries	
2023	The Proud Family: Louder and Prouder	Herself	Voice, episode: "A Perfect 10"	

=== Theatre ===
Year	Title	Role	Venue	Notes
2026	& Juliet	Charmion	Stephen Sondheim Theatre; March 17 – July 12, 2026	Broadway debut
2026	The 25th Annual Putnam County Spelling Bee	Logainne Schwartzandgrubenierre	New World Stages; September 7 – October 11, 2026	Off-Broadway replacement

== Honors ==
- In 2017, Hernandez received a Jefferson Award for Public Service for "Outstanding National or Global Service by a Young American 25 Years or Under."
- In June 2019, Hernandez was inducted into the New Jersey Hall of Fame.

== See also ==
- List of Puerto Ricans
- List of Olympic female artistic gymnasts for the United States

Awards and achievements
Preceded by Nyle DiMarco & Peta Murgatroyd	Dancing with the Stars (US) winners Season 23 (Fall 2016 with Valentin Chmerkovskiy)	Succeeded by Rashad Jennings & Emma Slater
