= Maggie Haney =

American former gymnastics coach

- Born: February 8, 1978 (age 48)
- Education: Lloyd V. Berkner High School
- Alma mater: North Carolina State University (1996–2000)
- Employer(s): MG Elite Gymnastics, Inc. (2007–present)

Maggie Elaine Haney (born February 8, 1978) is a former American gymnastics coach, who was suspended for eight years by USA Gymnastics in April 2020 due to abusive conduct. She has served as the head coach at MG Elite Gymnastics in Monmouth Junction, New Jersey, and is best known for coaching the 2016 Olympic gold medalist Laurie Hernandez and 2018 World champion Riley McCusker.

== Life and career ==
Haney began gymnastics at age three. She obtained an athletic scholarship at North Carolina State University, where she competed for the NC State Wolfpack women's gymnastics program from 1997 until 2000 and is credited with the most Perfect 10s in the program's history. On November 22, 1998, while attending North Carolina State University, Haney hosted a party that ended in a fatal shooting. She was charged with a misdemeanor alcohol violation and avoided prosecution.

Haney began coaching in New Jersey in 2007. Haney had at least one athlete from her program on the national team roster from 2013 to 2020. These athletes were Laurie Hernandez (2013-2016), Jazmyn Foberg (2014-2015), Riley McCusker (2016-2020), and Olivia Greaves (2018-2020). Under Haney's coaching, MG Elite gymnasts were noted for their dance skills and artistry.

=== Abusive conduct and suspension ===
USA Gymnastics officials first received abuse complaints against Haney in 2016. In August 2019, it was announced Haney was under investigation by USA Gymnastics over allegations of verbal and emotional abuse. At least a half dozen families filed complaints against Haney, alleging that she instructed injured gymnasts to remove casts and continue training, as well as screaming at and threatening gymnasts. On February 3, 2020, her hearing on the allegations began. She was suspended from coaching minor athletes pending the outcome of the hearing.

During the hearing, testimony was given regarding major injuries suffered by Haney's athletes. Her two most prominent students, Laurie Hernandez and Riley McCusker, both testified - Hernandez verbally, and McCusker through a written statement. McCusker, a world champion trained by Haney, suffered rhabdomyolysis, a muscle condition linked to overtraining, in 2019. The hearing lasted 13 days over two months - February and March. In March, USA Gymnastics suspended Victoria Levine, a coach and co-owner of MG Elite Gymnastics, due to allegations that she also was verbally abusive to athletes.

After the hearing, further details of the testimony came to light. Haney pulled gymnasts by their hair, swore and screamed at them - often calling them "retarded" - and threatened to commit suicide if top gymnasts left her program. Haney pressured gymnasts to remove casts and train or compete while injured. Parents were not allowed in the gymnastic club during practices, and Haney warned gymnasts not to complain about her coaching methods to their parents. When gymnasts made mistakes in training, Haney kicked them out of the gym. Gymnasts hid their menstrual periods from Haney, who told them that menstruating was proof that they were too fat. Gymnasts reported suffering from anxiety, depression, and eating disorders due to Haney's abuse.

In one incident, Haney and her assistant coach Victoria Levine refused to spot a gymnast as she attempted a new skill on the uneven bars. The gymnast fell and struck her head against exposed concrete before landing in a foam pit. Haney and Levine laughed at the gymnast until they realized she was having seizures. The gymnast had two skull fractures.

On April 29, Haney was suspended for eight years by USA Gymnastics for verbally and emotionally abusing gymnasts. She is prohibited from coaching USA Gymnastics athletes during this period, cannot contact the claimants, and cannot attend USA Gymnastics events unless accompanying her gymnast daughter. The sentence was later reduced to 5 years during an appeal. The arbitrator at the hearing found that some of the evidence presented was improperly used against Haney. She may reapply for membership after her suspension, but must go through an additional two-year probationary period and complete United States Center for SafeSport courses.

Haney was reported in late 2020 to be still privately coaching individual gymnasts despite the suspension.
