= Gymnastics at the 2016 Summer Olympics – Women's artistic team all-around =

Women's artistic team all-around at the Games of the XXXI Olympiad
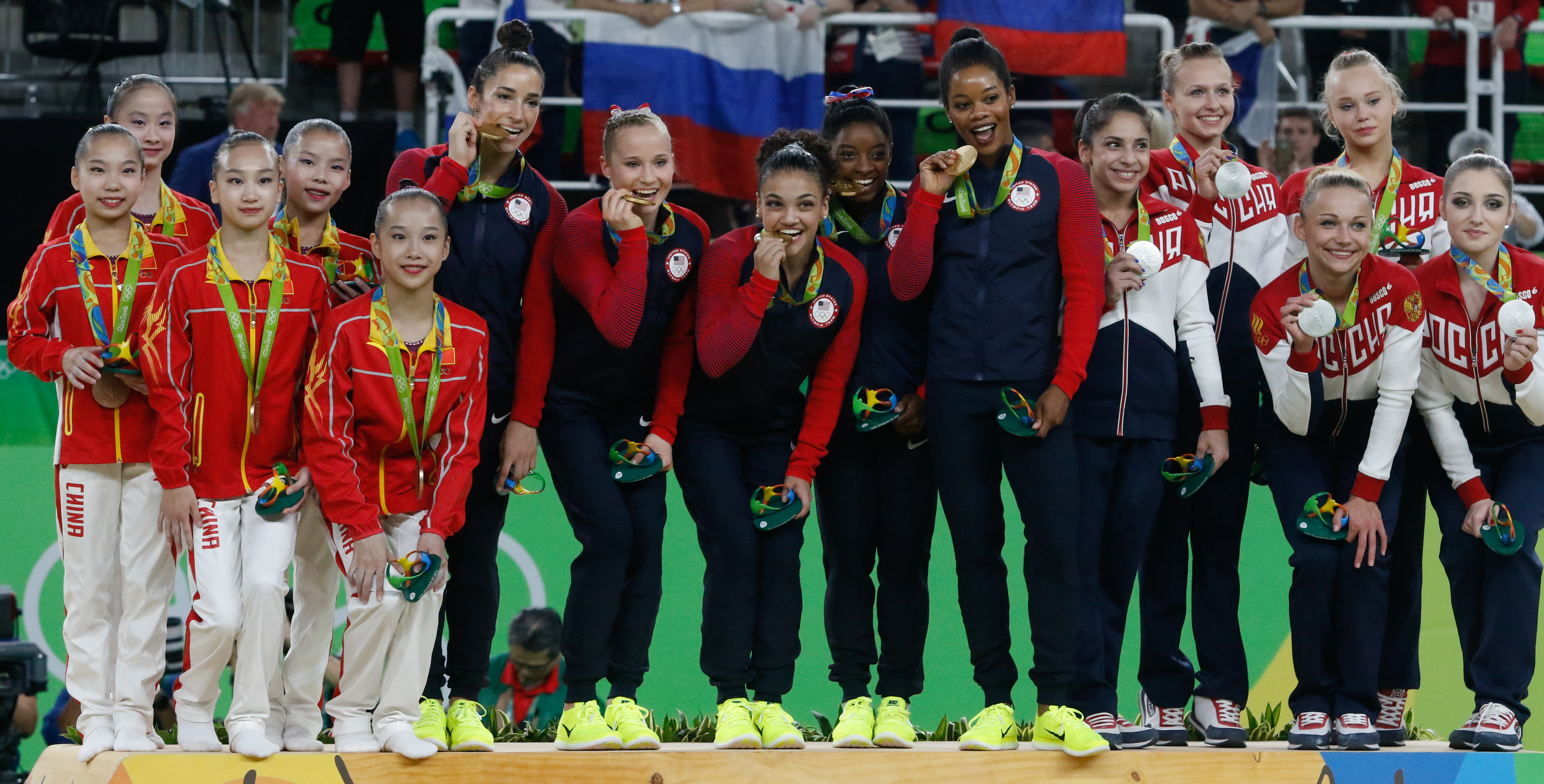
- The United States, Russia, and China accepting their medals
- Venue: HSBC Arena
- Date: 9 August 2016
- Competitors: 40 from 8 nations
- Winning total: 184.897 points

Medalists
1st place, gold medalist(s)		Simone Biles; Gabby Douglas; Laurie Hernandez; Madison Kocian; Aly Raisman	United States
2nd place, silver medalist(s)		Angelina Melnikova; Aliya Mustafina; Maria Paseka; Daria Spiridonova; Seda Tutkhalyan	Russia
3rd place, bronze medalist(s)		Fan Yilin; Mao Yi; Shang Chunsong; Tan Jiaxin; Wang Yan	China

The women's artistic team all-around competition at the 2016 Summer Olympics was held on 9 August 2016 at the HSBC Arena.

The United States finished first in the qualification and then won the event final by over eight points. It was Team USA's second consecutive Olympic team gold medal. The 2016 team, known as the Final Five, was led by Simone Biles, who performed all four rotations in the final. Russia won their second consecutive Olympic team silver.

== Competition format ==
The top 8 teams in qualifications, based on combined scores of each apparatus, advanced to the final. In the final, each team selected three gymnasts to compete on each apparatus. All scores on each apparatus were summed to give a final team score. The scores in qualification did not count in the final.

== Qualification ==
Team	Vault (gymnastics)		Uneven bars		Balance beam		Floor (gymnastics)		Total (All-around)	
Team	Score	Rank	Score	Rank	Score	Rank	Score	Rank	Score	Rank
United States	46.966	1	46.632	2	45.832	1	45.808	1	185.238	1
China	44.515	5	45.166	4	43.332	4	42.266	5	175.279	2
Russia	44.832	3	46.649	1	41.988	8	41.141	10	174.620	3
Great Britain	44.432	7	44.666	5	42.400	6	42.566	3	174.064	4
Brazil	45.299	2	43.357	9	43.599	3	41.799	7	174.054	5
Germany	43.333	9	45.699	3	42.499	5	41.732	8	173.263	6
Japan	44.466	6	44.100	6	41.699	10	42.299	4	172.564	7
Netherlands	43.132	10	43.866	7	43.732	2	41.199	9	171.929	8
Canada	44.732	4	43.499	8	41.565	11	41.965	6	171.761	9
Italy	43.366	8	42.266	12	40.332	12	43.432	2	169.396	10
France	42.299	11	43.099	10	42.399	7	40.899	12	168.696	11
Belgium	42.033	12	43.041	11	41.765	9	40.999	11	167.838	12

== Final ==
Rank	Team	Vault (gymnastics)	Uneven bars	Balance beam	Floor (gymnastics)	Total
1st place, gold medalist(s)	United States	46.866 (1)	46.499 (1)	45.533 (1)	45.999 (1)	184.897
1st place, gold medalist(s)	Simone Biles (USA)	15.933	14.800	15.300	15.800	61.833
1st place, gold medalist(s)	Aly Raisman (USA)	15.833		15.000	15.366	46.199
1st place, gold medalist(s)	Laurie Hernandez (USA)	15.100		15.233	14.833	45.166
1st place, gold medalist(s)	Madison Kocian (USA)		15.933			15.933
1st place, gold medalist(s)	Gabby Douglas (USA)		15.766			15.766
2nd place, silver medalist(s)	Russia	45.733 (2)	46.166 (2)	42.757 (5)	42.032 (5)	176.688
2nd place, silver medalist(s)	Aliya Mustafina (RUS)	15.133	15.933	14.958	14.000	60.024
2nd place, silver medalist(s)	Angelina Melnikova (RUS)	14.900	15.133	13.033	14.266	57.332
2nd place, silver medalist(s)	Seda Tutkhalyan (RUS)			14.766	13.766	28.532
2nd place, silver medalist(s)	Maria Paseka (RUS)	15.700				15.700
2nd place, silver medalist(s)	Daria Spiridonova (RUS)		15.100			15.100
3rd place, bronze medalist(s)	China	44.332 (6)	45.007 (4)	44.598 (2)	42.066 (4)	176.003
3rd place, bronze medalist(s)	Shang Chunsong (CHN)		14.333	15.066	14.700	44.099
3rd place, bronze medalist(s)	Wang Yan (CHN)	14.733		14.466	14.733	43.932
3rd place, bronze medalist(s)	Fan Yilin (CHN)		15.733	15.066		30.799
3rd place, bronze medalist(s)	Tan Jiaxin (CHN)	14.766	14.941			29.707
3rd place, bronze medalist(s)	Mao Yi (CHN)	14.833			12.633	27.466
4	Japan	44.832 (4)	44.466 (6)	42.599 (6)	42.474 (3)	174.371
4	Asuka Teramoto (JPN)	14.933	14.866	14.466		44.265
4	Mai Murakami (JPN)	14.833		13.833	14.466	43.132
4	Aiko Sugihara (JPN)		14.600	14.300	14.100	43.000
4	Sae Miyakawa (JPN)	15.066			13.908	28.974
4	Yuki Uchiyama (JPN)		15.000			15.000
5	Great Britain	44.766 (5)	44.866 (5)	41.965 (8)	42.765 (2)	174.362
5	Ellie Downie (GBR)	15.133	14.633	13.366	14.133	57.265
5	Claudia Fragapane (GBR)	14.700		14.433	14.166	43.299
5	Becky Downie (GBR)		15.400	14.166		29.566
5	Amy Tinkler (GBR)	14.933			14.466	29.399
5	Ruby Harrold (GBR)		14.833			14.833
6	Germany	42.999 (8)	45.899 (3)	43.100 (4)	41.674 (7)	173.672
6	Elisabeth Seitz (GER)		15.533	14.000	13.833	43.366
6	Pauline Schäfer (GER)	14.266		14.500	14.375	43.141
6	Tabea Alt (GER)	14.800		14.600		29.400
6	Sophie Scheder (GER)	13.933	15.466			29.399
6	Kim Bui (GER)		14.900		13.466	28.366
7	Netherlands	43.033 (7)	43.666 (7)	44.082 (3)	41.666 (8)	172.447
7	Eythora Thorsdottir (NED)	15.000	14.733	14.566	13.900	58.199
7	Lieke Wevers (NED)	13.933		14.266	13.833	42.032
7	Sanne Wevers (NED)		14.533	15.250		29.783
7	Céline van Gerner (NED)		14.400		13.933	28.333
7	Vera van Pol (NED)	14.100				14.100
8	Brazil	44.899 (3)	43.457 (8)	41.999 (7)	41.732 (6)	172.087
8	Jade Barbosa (BRA)	14.933	14.391	13.033	14.266	56.623
8	Rebeca Andrade (BRA)	15.400	14.900		12.966	43.266
8	Flávia Saraiva (BRA)			14.833	14.500	29.333
8	Lorrane Oliveira (BRA)	14.566	14.166			28.732
8	Daniele Hypólito (BRA)			14.133		14.133

The medals were presented by Denis Oswald, Switzerland, Syed Shahid Ali, Pakistan, and Anant Singh, South Africa, members of the International Olympic Committee; the gifts were presented by Bruno Grandi, President of the FIG, Mireille Ganzin, President of the FIG Aerobic Gymnastics Technical Committee and Rosi Taeymans, President of the FIG Acrobatic Gymnastics Technical Committee.
