= Gymnastics at the 2024 Summer Olympics – Women's artistic team all-around =

Women's artistic team all-around at the Games of the XXXIII Olympiad
- Venue: Accor Arena
- Date: 28 July 2024 (qualifying); 30 July 2024 (final)
- Competitors: 39 from 8 nations
- Winning total: 171.296

Medalists
1st place, gold medalist(s)		Simone Biles; Jade Carey; Jordan Chiles; Sunisa Lee; Hezly Rivera	United States
2nd place, silver medalist(s)		Angela Andreoli; Alice D'Amato; Manila Esposito; Elisa Iorio; Giorgia Villa	Italy
3rd place, bronze medalist(s)		Rebeca Andrade; Jade Barbosa; Lorrane Oliveira; Flávia Saraiva; Júlia Soares	Brazil

The women's artistic team all-around event at the 2024 Summer Olympics was held on 28 July and 30 July 2024 at the Accor Arena (referred to as the Bercy Arena due to IOC sponsorship rules). It was contested by 11 teams of five gymnasts and one team of four gymnasts.

Ten days before the competition, Japanese officials removed 19-year-old Shoko Miyata from the Japanese team for smoking and drinking alcohol, which are prohibited in Japan for those under 20. Since Miyata was removed for a reason other than injury, Team Japan chose to not provide a substitute athlete and the Japanese women's team competed with only four athletes.

== Qualified teams ==
To reach the Olympics, a National Olympic Committee had to earn one of 12 team quota places. These consisted of the top three teams in the 2022 World Artistic Gymnastics Championships:

- United States
- Great Britain
- Canada

and top nine in the 2023 championships, excluding those who qualified in 2022:

- China
- Brazil
- Italy
- Netherlands
- France
- Japan
- Australia
- Romania
- South Korea.

Those 12 teams competed in the qualification round in Paris on 28 July; the top eight advanced to the final.

== Schedule ==
Date	Time	Round	Subdivision
28 July	09:30	Qualification	Subdivision 1
28 July	11:40	Qualification	Subdivision 2
28 July	14:50	Qualification	Subdivision 3
28 July	18:00	Qualification	Subdivision 4
28 July	21:10	Qualification	Subdivision 5
30 July	18:15	Final	–
All times are Central European Summer Time (UTC+2)

== Qualifications ==
The top eight teams in qualifications, based on combined scores of each apparatus, advanced to the final. In the final, each team selected three gymnasts to compete on each apparatus. All scores on each apparatus were summed to give a final team score. The scores in qualification did not carry over to the final.

Rank	Team	Vault (gymnastics)	Uneven bars	Balance beam	Floor (gymnastics)	Total
1	United States	44.799	43.565	42.366	41.566	172.296
2	Italy	41.632	43.198	41.198	40.833	166.861
3	China	40.099	43.732	42.132	40.665	166.628
4	Brazil	42.733	41.433	41.433	40.900	166.499
5	Japan	40.965	40.432	40.733	40.066	162.196
6	Canada	42.133	41.132	39.199	39.099	161.563
7	Great Britain	41.966	39.399	40.333	39.132	160.830
8	Romania	40.966	36.999	40.799	40.733	159.497

== Final ==
Rank	Team	Vault (gymnastics)	Uneven bars	Balance beam	Floor (gymnastics)	Total
1st place, gold medalist(s)	United States	44.100 (1)	43.332 (1)	41.699 (1)	42.165 (1)	171.296
1st place, gold medalist(s)	Simone Biles (USA)	14.900	14.400	14.366	14.666	171.296
1st place, gold medalist(s)	Jade Carey (USA)	14.800				171.296
1st place, gold medalist(s)	Jordan Chiles (USA)	14.400	14.366	12.733	13.966	171.296
1st place, gold medalist(s)	Sunisa Lee (USA)		14.566	14.600	13.533	171.296
1st place, gold medalist(s)	Hezly Rivera (USA)					171.296
2nd place, silver medalist(s)	Italy	41.665 (5)	42.665 (3)	41.199 (3)	39.965 (5)	165.494
2nd place, silver medalist(s)	Angela Andreoli (ITA)	13.566		13.300	13.833	165.494
2nd place, silver medalist(s)	Alice D'Amato (ITA)	13.933	14.633	13.933	13.466	165.494
2nd place, silver medalist(s)	Manila Esposito (ITA)	14.166		13.966	12.666	165.494
2nd place, silver medalist(s)	Elisa Iorio (ITA)		14.266			165.494
2nd place, silver medalist(s)	Giorgia Villa (ITA)		13.766			165.494
3rd place, bronze medalist(s)	Brazil	42.366 (2)	41.199 (5)	39.966 (6)	40.966 (2)	164.497
3rd place, bronze medalist(s)	Rebeca Andrade (BRA)	15.100	14.533	14.133	14.200	164.497
3rd place, bronze medalist(s)	Jade Barbosa (BRA)	13.366				164.497
3rd place, bronze medalist(s)	Lorrane Oliveira (BRA)		13.000			164.497
3rd place, bronze medalist(s)	Flávia Saraiva (BRA)	13.900	13.666	13.433	13.533	164.497
3rd place, bronze medalist(s)	Júlia Soares (BRA)			12.400	13.233	164.497
4	Great Britain	41.732 (4)	42.233 (4)	40.099 (5)	40.199 (4)	164.263
4	Becky Downie (GBR)		14.933	12.933		164.263
4	Ruby Evans (GBR)	13.966			13.100	164.263
4	Georgia-Mae Fenton (GBR)	13.800	14.000	13.566		164.263
4	Alice Kinsella (GBR)	13.966	13.300	13.600	13.633	164.263
4	Abigail Martin (GBR)				13.466	164.263
5	Canada	41.866 (3)	39.800 (6)	41.433 (2)	39.333 (7)	162.432
5	Ellie Black (CAN)	14.166	12.800	14.300	13.633	162.432
5	Cassie Lee (CAN)			13.333	12.600	162.432
5	Shallon Olsen (CAN)	14.400				162.432
5	Ava Stewart (CAN)	13.300	13.500	13.800		162.432
5	Aurélie Tran (CAN)		13.500		13.100	162.432
6	China	39.999 (8)	42.666 (2)	40.800 (4)	38.666 (8)	162.131
6	Luo Huan (CHN)	13.166	13.933	13.900		162.131
6	Ou Yushan (CHN)				12.733	162.131
6	Qiu Qiyuan (CHN)	13.133	14.300	14.600		162.131
6	Zhang Yihan (CHN)	13.700	14.433		12.733	162.131
6	Zhou Yaqin (CHN)			12.300	13.200	162.131
7	Romania	40.999 (6)	38.899 (8)	39.000 (8)	40.599 (3)	159.497
7	Ana Bărbosu (ROU)	13.933	12.433	12.700	13.566	159.497
7	Lilia Cosman (ROU)	13.433	13.133			159.497
7	Amalia Ghigoarță (ROU)		13.333	12.500	13.133	159.497
7	Sabrina Voinea (ROU)	13.633		13.800	13.900	159.497
7	Andreea Preda (ROU)					159.497
8	Japan	40.765 (7)	39.133 (7)	39.966 (7)	39.599 (6)	159.463
8	Rina Kishi (JPN)	13.966	13.600	13.466	13.433	159.463
8	Haruka Nakamura (JPN)	12.966	12.433	12.800	13.233	159.463
8	Mana Okamura (JPN)		13.100	13.700	12.933	159.463
8	Kohane Ushioku (JPN)	13.833				159.463
