= List of Olympic medalists in gymnastics (women) =

This is the complete list of women's Olympic medalists in gymnastics.

== Artistic gymnastics ==
=== Current program ===
==== All-around, individual ====
Games	Gold	Silver	Bronze
1952 Helsinki	Maria Gorokhovskaya; Soviet Union	Nina Bocharova; Soviet Union	Margit Korondi; Hungary
1956 Melbourne	Larisa Latynina; Soviet Union	Ágnes Keleti; Hungary	Sofia Muratova; Soviet Union
1960 Rome	Larisa Latynina; Soviet Union	Sofia Muratova; Soviet Union	Polina Astakhova; Soviet Union
1964 Tokyo	Věra Čáslavská; Czechoslovakia	Larisa Latynina; Soviet Union	Polina Astakhova; Soviet Union
1968 Mexico City	Věra Čáslavská; Czechoslovakia	Zinaida Voronina; Soviet Union	Natalia Kuchinskaya; Soviet Union
1972 Munich	Ludmilla Tourischeva; Soviet Union	Karin Janz; East Germany	Tamara Lazakovich; Soviet Union
1976 Montreal	Nadia Comăneci; Romania	Nellie Kim; Soviet Union	Ludmilla Tourischeva; Soviet Union
1980 Moscow	Yelena Davydova; Soviet Union	Nadia Comăneci; Romania	none awarded
1980 Moscow	Yelena Davydova; Soviet Union	Maxi Gnauck; East Germany	none awarded
1984 Los Angeles	Mary Lou Retton; United States	Ecaterina Szabo; Romania	Simona Păucă; Romania
1988 Seoul	Yelena Shushunova; Soviet Union	Daniela Silivaș; Romania	Svetlana Boginskaya; Soviet Union
1992 Barcelona	Tatiana Gutsu; Unified Team	Shannon Miller; United States	Lavinia Miloșovici; Romania
1996 Atlanta	Lilia Podkopayeva; Ukraine	Gina Gogean; Romania	Simona Amânar; Romania
1996 Atlanta	Lilia Podkopayeva; Ukraine	Gina Gogean; Romania	Lavinia Miloșovici; Romania
2000 Sydney	Simona Amânar; Romania	Maria Olaru; Romania	Liu Xuan; China
2004 Athens	Carly Patterson; United States	Svetlana Khorkina; Russia	Zhang Nan; China
2008 Beijing	Nastia Liukin; United States	Shawn Johnson; United States	Yang Yilin; China
2012 London	Gabby Douglas; United States	Viktoria Komova; Russia	Aliya Mustafina; Russia
2016 Rio de Janeiro	Simone Biles; United States	Aly Raisman; United States	Aliya Mustafina; Russia
2020 Tokyo	Sunisa Lee; United States	Rebeca Andrade; Brazil	Angelina Melnikova; ROC
2024 Paris	Simone Biles; United States	Rebeca Andrade; Brazil	Sunisa Lee; United States
2028 Los Angeles			

==== All-around, team ====
Games	Gold	Silver	Bronze
1928 Amsterdam	Netherlands; Estella Agsteribbe; Jacomina van den Berg; Alida van den Bos; Petronella Burgerhof; Elka de Levie; Helena Nordheim; Ans Polak; Petronella van Randwijk; Hendrika van Rumt; Jud Simons; Jacoba Stelma; Anna van der Vegt	Italy; Bianca Ambrosetti; Lavinia Gianoni; Luigina Giavotti; Virginia Giorgi; Germana Malabarba; Carla Marangoni; Luigina Perversi; Diana Pizzavini; Luisa Tanzini; Carolina Tronconi; Ines Vercesi; Rita Vittadini	Great Britain; Annie Broadbent; Lucy Desmond; Margaret Hartley; Amy Jagger; Isobel Judd; Jessie Kite; Marjorie Moreman; Edith Pickles; Ethel Seymour; Ada Smith; Hilda Smith; Doris Woods
1932 Los Angeles	Not on the Olympic program.		
1936 Berlin	Germany; Anita Bärwirth; Erna Bürger; Isolde Frölian; Friedl Iby; Trudi Meyer; Paula Pöhlsen; Julie Schmitt; Käthe Sohnemann	Czechoslovakia; Jaroslava Bajerová; Vlasta Děkanová; Božena Dobešová; Vlasta Foltová; Anna Hřebřinová; Matylda Pálfyová; Zdeňka Veřmiřovská; Marie Větrovská	Hungary; Margit Csillik; Margit Kalocsai; Ilona Madary; Gabriella Mészáros; Margit Nagy; Olga Törös; Judit Tóth; Eszter Voit
1948 London	Czechoslovakia; Zdeňka Honsová; Marie Kovářová; Miloslava Misáková; Milena Müllerová; Věra Růžičková; Olga Šilhánová; Božena Srncová; Zdeňka Veřmiřovská	Hungary; Erzsébet Balázs; Irén Karcsics; Anna Fehér; Erzsébet Gulyás-Köteles; Olga Tass; Margit Nagy-Sándor; Edit Perényi-Weckinger; Mária Zalai-Kövi	United States; Ladislava Bakanic; Marian Barone; Dorothy Dalton; Meta Elste; Consetta Lenz; Helen Schifano; Clara Schroth; Anita Simonis
1952 Helsinki	Soviet Union; Nina Bocharova; Pelageya Danilova; Maria Gorokhovskaya; Medea Jugeli; Ekaterina Kalinchuk; Galina Minaicheva; Galina Shamrai; Galina Urbanovich	Hungary; Andrea Bodó; Irén Daruházi-Karcsics; Erzsébet Gulyás-Köteles; Ágnes Keleti; Margit Korondi; Edit Perényi-Weckinger; Olga Tass; Mária Kövi-Zalai	Czechoslovakia; Hana Bobková; Alena Chadimová; Jana Rabasová; Alena Reichová; Matylda Šínová; Božena Srncová; Věra Vančurová; Eva Věchtová
1956 Melbourne	Soviet Union; Polina Astakhova; Lyudmila Yegorova; Lidia Kalinina; Larisa Latynina; Tamara Manina; Sofia Muratova	Hungary; Erzsébet Gulyás-Köteles; Ágnes Keleti; Alice Kertész; Margit Korondi; Olga Lemhényi-Tass; Andrea Molnár-Bodó	Romania; Georgeta Hurmuzachi; Sonia Iovan; Elena Leușteanu; Elena Mărgărit; Elena Săcălici; Emilia Vătășoiu
1960 Rome	Soviet Union; Polina Astakhova; Lidia Ivanova; Larisa Latynina; Tamara Lyukhina; Sofia Muratova; Margarita Nikolaeva	Czechoslovakia; Eva Bosáková; Věra Čáslavská; Matylda Matoušková; Hana Růžičková; Ludmila Švédová; Adolfína Tačová	Romania; Atanasia Ionescu; Sonia Iovan; Elena Leușteanu; Elena Niculescu; Uta Poreceanu; Emilia Vătășoiu
1964 Tokyo	Soviet Union; Polina Astakhova; Lyudmila Gromova; Larisa Latynina; Tamara Manina; Elena Volchetskaya; Tamara Zamotailova	Czechoslovakia; Věra Čáslavská; Marianna Krajčírová; Jana Kubičková; Hana Růžičková; Jaroslava Sedláčková; Adolfína Tkačíková	Japan; Toshiko Aihara; Ginko Chiba; Keiko Ikeda; Taniko Nakamura; Kiyoko Ono; Hiroko Tsuji
1968 Mexico City	Soviet Union; Lyubov Burda; Olga Karaseva; Natalia Kuchinskaya; Larisa Petrik; Ludmilla Tourischeva; Zinaida Voronina	Czechoslovakia; Věra Čáslavská; Marianna Krajčírová; Jana Kubičková; Hana Lišková; Bohumila Řimnáčová; Miroslava Skleničková	East Germany; Maritta Bauerschmidt; Karin Janz; Marianne Noack; Magdalena Schmidt; Ute Starke; Erika Zuchold
1972 Munich	Soviet Union; Lyubov Burda; Olga Korbut; Antonina Koshel; Tamara Lazakovich; Elvira Saadi; Ludmilla Tourischeva	East Germany; Irene Abel; Angelika Hellmann; Karin Janz; Richarda Schmeißer; Christine Schmitt; Erika Zuchold	Hungary; Ilona Békési; Mónika Császár; Márta Kelemen; Anikó Kéry; Krisztina Medveczky; Zsuzsa Nagy
1976 Montreal	Soviet Union; Maria Filatova; Svetlana Grozdova; Nellie Kim; Olga Korbut; Elvira Saadi; Ludmilla Tourischeva	Romania; Nadia Comăneci; Mariana Constantin; Georgeta Gabor; Anca Grigoraș; Gabriela Trușcă; Teodora Ungureanu	East Germany; Carola Dombeck; Gitta Escher; Kerstin Gerschau; Angelika Hellmann; Marion Kische; Steffi Kräker
1980 Moscow	Soviet Union; Yelena Davydova; Maria Filatova; Nellie Kim; Yelena Naimushina; Natalia Shaposhnikova; Stella Zakharova	Romania; Nadia Comăneci; Rodica Dunca; Emilia Eberle; Cristina Elena Grigoraș; Melita Ruhn; Dumitrița Turner	East Germany; Maxi Gnauck; Silvia Hindorff; Steffi Kräker; Katharina Rensch; Karola Sube; Birgit Süß
1984 Los Angeles	Romania; Lavinia Agache; Laura Cutina; Cristina Elena Grigoraș; Simona Păucă; Mihaela Stănuleț; Ecaterina Szabo	United States; Pamela Bileck; Michelle Dusserre; Kathy Johnson; Julianne McNamara; Mary Lou Retton; Tracee Talavera	China; Chen Yongyan; Huang Qun; Ma Yanhong; Wu Jiani; Zhou Ping; Zhou Qiurui
1988 Seoul	Soviet Union; Svetlana Baitova; Svetlana Boginskaya; Natalia Laschenova; Elena Shevchenko; Yelena Shushunova; Olga Strazheva	Romania; Aurelia Dobre; Eugenia Golea; Celestina Popa; Gabriela Potorac; Daniela Silivaș; Camelia Voinea	East Germany; Gabriele Fähnrich; Martina Jentsch; Dagmar Kersten; Ulrike Klotz; Bettina Schieferdecker; Dörte Thümmler
1992 Barcelona	Unified Team; Svetlana Boginskaya; Oksana Chusovitina; Rozalia Galiyeva; Elena Grudneva; Tatiana Gutsu; Tatiana Lysenko	Romania; Cristina Bontaș; Gina Gogean; Vanda Hădărean; Lavinia Miloșovici; Maria Neculiță; Mirela Pașca	United States; Wendy Bruce; Dominique Dawes; Shannon Miller; Betty Okino; Kerri Strug; Kim Zmeskal
1996 Atlanta	United States; Amanda Borden; Amy Chow; Dominique Dawes; Shannon Miller; Dominique Moceanu; Jaycie Phelps; Kerri Strug	Russia; Elena Dolgopolova; Rozalia Galiyeva; Elena Grosheva; Svetlana Khorkina; Dina Kochetkova; Yevgeniya Kuznetsova; Oksana Lyapina	Romania; Simona Amânar; Gina Gogean; Ionela Loaieș; Alexandra Marinescu; Lavinia Miloșovici; Mirela Țugurlan
2000 Sydney	Romania; Simona Amânar; Loredana Boboc; Andreea Isărescu; Maria Olaru; Claudia Presăcan; Andreea Răducan	Russia; Anna Chepeleva; Anastasiya Kolesnikova; Svetlana Khorkina; Yekaterina Lobaznyuk; Yelena Produnova; Elena Zamolodchikova	United States; Amy Chow; Jamie Dantzscher; Dominique Dawes; Kristen Maloney; Elise Ray; Tasha Schwikert
2004 Athens	Romania; Oana Ban; Alexandra Eremia; Cătălina Ponor; Monica Roșu; Nicoleta Daniela Șofronie; Silvia Stroescu	United States; Mohini Bhardwaj; Annia Hatch; Terin Humphrey; Courtney Kupets; Courtney McCool; Carly Patterson	Russia; Ludmila Ezhova; Svetlana Khorkina; Maria Kryuchkova; Anna Pavlova; Elena Zamolodchikova; Natalia Ziganshina
2008 Beijing	China; Cheng Fei; Deng Linlin; He Kexin; Jiang Yuyuan; Li Shanshan; Yang Yilin	United States; Shawn Johnson; Nastia Liukin; Chellsie Memmel; Samantha Peszek; Alicia Sacramone; Bridget Sloan	Romania; Andreea Acatrinei; Gabriela Drăgoi; Andreea Grigore; Sandra Izbașa; Steliana Nistor; Anamaria Tămârjan
2012 London	United States; Gabby Douglas; McKayla Maroney; Aly Raisman; Kyla Ross; Jordyn Wieber	Russia; Ksenia Afanasyeva; Anastasia Grishina; Viktoria Komova; Aliya Mustafina; Maria Paseka	Romania; Diana Bulimar; Diana Chelaru; Larisa Iordache; Sandra Izbașa; Cătălina Ponor
2016 Rio de Janeiro	United States; Simone Biles; Gabby Douglas; Laurie Hernandez; Madison Kocian; Aly Raisman	Russia; Angelina Melnikova; Aliya Mustafina; Maria Paseka; Daria Spiridonova; Seda Tutkhalyan	China; Fan Yilin; Mao Yi; Shang Chunsong; Tan Jiaxin; Wang Yan
2020 Tokyo	ROC (ROC); Lilia Akhaimova; Viktoria Listunova; Angelina Melnikova; Vladislava Urazova	United States; Simone Biles; Jordan Chiles; Sunisa Lee; Grace McCallum	Great Britain; Jennifer Gadirova; Jessica Gadirova; Alice Kinsella; Amelie Morgan
2024 Paris	United States; Simone Biles; Jade Carey; Jordan Chiles; Sunisa Lee; Hezly Rivera	Italy; Angela Andreoli; Alice D'Amato; Manila Esposito; Elisa Iorio; Giorgia Villa	Brazil; Rebeca Andrade; Jade Barbosa; Lorrane Oliveira; Flávia Saraiva; Júlia Soares
2028 Los Angeles			

Note: The International Gymnastics Federation recommended to the IOC that the medals of the Chinese team be stripped, and awarded to the fourth-placed United States team, as it was revealed that Dong Fangxiao was underage (14, with age limit >16) at the time. The IOC upheld the FIG decision in April 2010.

==== Balance beam ====
Games	Gold	Silver	Bronze
1952 Helsinki	Nina Bocharova; Soviet Union	Maria Gorokhovskaya; Soviet Union	Margit Korondi; Hungary
1956 Melbourne	Ágnes Keleti; Hungary	Eva Bosáková; Czechoslovakia	none awarded
1956 Melbourne	Ágnes Keleti; Hungary	Tamara Manina; Soviet Union	none awarded
1960 Rome	Eva Bosáková; Czechoslovakia	Larisa Latynina; Soviet Union	Sofia Muratova; Soviet Union
1964 Tokyo	Věra Čáslavská; Czechoslovakia	Tamara Manina; Soviet Union	Larisa Latynina; Soviet Union
1968 Mexico City	Natalia Kuchinskaya; Soviet Union	Věra Čáslavská; Czechoslovakia	Larisa Petrik; Soviet Union
1972 Munich	Olga Korbut; Soviet Union	Tamara Lazakovich; Soviet Union	Karin Janz; East Germany
1976 Montreal	Nadia Comăneci; Romania	Olga Korbut; Soviet Union	Teodora Ungureanu; Romania
1980 Moscow	Nadia Comăneci; Romania	Yelena Davydova; Soviet Union	Natalia Shaposhnikova; Soviet Union
1984 Los Angeles	Simona Păucă; Romania	none awarded	Kathy Johnson; United States
1984 Los Angeles	Ecaterina Szabo; Romania	none awarded	Kathy Johnson; United States
1988 Seoul	Daniela Silivaș; Romania	Yelena Shushunova; Soviet Union	Phoebe Mills; United States
1988 Seoul	Daniela Silivaș; Romania	Yelena Shushunova; Soviet Union	Gabriela Potorac; Romania
1992 Barcelona	Tatiana Lysenko; Unified Team	Lu Li; China	none awarded
1992 Barcelona	Tatiana Lysenko; Unified Team	Shannon Miller; United States	none awarded
1996 Atlanta	Shannon Miller; United States	Lilia Podkopayeva; Ukraine	Gina Gogean; Romania
2000 Sydney	Liu Xuan; China	Yekaterina Lobaznyuk; Russia	Yelena Produnova; Russia
2004 Athens	Cătălina Ponor; Romania	Carly Patterson; United States	Alexandra Eremia; Romania
2008 Beijing	Shawn Johnson; United States	Nastia Liukin; United States	Cheng Fei; China
2012 London	Deng Linlin; China	Sui Lu; China	Aly Raisman; United States
2016 Rio de Janeiro	Sanne Wevers; Netherlands	Laurie Hernandez; United States	Simone Biles; United States
2020 Tokyo	Guan Chenchen; China	Tang Xijing; China	Simone Biles; United States
2024 Paris	Alice D'Amato; Italy	Zhou Yaqin; China	Manila Esposito; Italy
2028 Los Angeles			

==== Floor exercise ====
Games	Gold	Silver	Bronze
1952 Helsinki	Ágnes Keleti; Hungary	Maria Gorokhovskaya; Soviet Union	Margit Korondi; Hungary
1956 Melbourne	Ágnes Keleti; Hungary	none awarded	Elena Leușteanu; Romania
1956 Melbourne	Larisa Latynina; Soviet Union	none awarded	Elena Leușteanu; Romania
1960 Rome	Larisa Latynina; Soviet Union	Polina Astakhova; Soviet Union	Tamara Lyukhina; Soviet Union
1964 Tokyo	Larisa Latynina; Soviet Union	Polina Astakhova; Soviet Union	Anikó Ducza; Hungary
1968 Mexico City	Věra Čáslavská; Czechoslovakia	none awarded	Natalia Kuchinskaya; Soviet Union
1968 Mexico City	Larisa Petrik; Soviet Union	none awarded	Natalia Kuchinskaya; Soviet Union
1972 Munich	Olga Korbut; Soviet Union	Ludmilla Tourischeva; Soviet Union	Tamara Lazakovich; Soviet Union
1976 Montreal	Nellie Kim; Soviet Union	Ludmilla Tourischeva; Soviet Union	Nadia Comăneci; Romania
1980 Moscow	Nadia Comăneci; Romania	none awarded	Maxi Gnauck; East Germany
1980 Moscow	Nellie Kim; Soviet Union	none awarded	Natalia Shaposhnikova; Soviet Union
1984 Los Angeles	Ecaterina Szabo; Romania	Julianne McNamara; United States	Mary Lou Retton; United States
1988 Seoul	Daniela Silivaș; Romania	Svetlana Boginskaya; Soviet Union	Diana Dudeva; Bulgaria
1992 Barcelona	Lavinia Miloșovici; Romania	Henrietta Ónodi; Hungary	Cristina Bontaș; Romania
1992 Barcelona	Lavinia Miloșovici; Romania	Henrietta Ónodi; Hungary	Tatiana Gutsu; Unified Team
1992 Barcelona	Lavinia Miloșovici; Romania	Henrietta Ónodi; Hungary	Shannon Miller; United States
1996 Atlanta	Lilia Podkopayeva; Ukraine	Simona Amânar; Romania	Dominique Dawes; United States
2000 Sydney	Elena Zamolodchikova; Russia	Svetlana Khorkina; Russia	Simona Amânar; Romania
2004 Athens	Cătălina Ponor; Romania	Nicoleta Daniela Șofronie; Romania	Patricia Moreno; Spain
2008 Beijing	Sandra Izbașa; Romania	Shawn Johnson; United States	Nastia Liukin; United States
2012 London	Aly Raisman; United States	Cătălina Ponor; Romania	Aliya Mustafina; Russia
2016 Rio de Janeiro	Simone Biles; United States	Aly Raisman; United States	Amy Tinkler; Great Britain
2020 Tokyo	Jade Carey; United States	Vanessa Ferrari; Italy	Angelina Melnikova; ROC
2020 Tokyo	Jade Carey; United States	Vanessa Ferrari; Italy	Mai Murakami; Japan
2024 Paris	Rebeca Andrade; Brazil	Simone Biles; United States	Ana Bărbosu; Romania
2028 Los Angeles			

==== Uneven bars ====
Games	Gold	Silver	Bronze
1952 Helsinki	Margit Korondi; Hungary	Maria Gorokhovskaya; Soviet Union	Ágnes Keleti; Hungary
1956 Melbourne	Ágnes Keleti; Hungary	Larisa Latynina; Soviet Union	Sofia Muratova; Soviet Union
1960 Rome	Polina Astakhova; Soviet Union	Larisa Latynina; Soviet Union	Tamara Lyukhina; Soviet Union
1964 Tokyo	Polina Astakhova; Soviet Union	Katalin Makray; Hungary	Larisa Latynina; Soviet Union
1968 Mexico City	Věra Čáslavská; Czechoslovakia	Karin Janz; East Germany	Zinaida Voronina; Soviet Union
1972 Munich	Karin Janz; East Germany	Olga Korbut; Soviet Union	none awarded
1972 Munich	Karin Janz; East Germany	Erika Zuchold; East Germany	none awarded
1976 Montreal	Nadia Comăneci; Romania	Teodora Ungureanu; Romania	Márta Egervári; Hungary
1980 Moscow	Maxi Gnauck; East Germany	Emilia Eberle; Romania	Maria Filatova; Soviet Union
1980 Moscow	Maxi Gnauck; East Germany	Emilia Eberle; Romania	Steffi Kräker; East Germany
1980 Moscow	Maxi Gnauck; East Germany	Emilia Eberle; Romania	Melita Ruhn; Romania
1984 Los Angeles	Ma Yanhong; China	none awarded	Mary Lou Retton; United States
1984 Los Angeles	Julianne McNamara; United States	none awarded	Mary Lou Retton; United States
1988 Seoul	Daniela Silivaș; Romania	Dagmar Kersten; East Germany	Yelena Shushunova; Soviet Union
1992 Barcelona	Lu Li; China	Tatiana Gutsu; Unified Team	Shannon Miller; United States
1996 Atlanta	Svetlana Khorkina; Russia	Amy Chow; United States	none awarded
1996 Atlanta	Svetlana Khorkina; Russia	Bi Wenjing; China	none awarded
2000 Sydney	Svetlana Khorkina; Russia	Ling Jie; China	Yang Yun; China
2004 Athens	Émilie Le Pennec; France	Terin Humphrey; United States	Courtney Kupets; United States
2008 Beijing	He Kexin; China	Nastia Liukin; United States	Yang Yilin; China
2012 London	Aliya Mustafina; Russia	He Kexin; China	Beth Tweddle; Great Britain
2016 Rio de Janeiro	Aliya Mustafina; Russia	Madison Kocian; United States	Sophie Scheder; Germany
2020 Tokyo	Nina Derwael; Belgium	Anastasia Ilyankova; ROC	Sunisa Lee; United States
2024 Paris	Kaylia Nemour; Algeria	Qiu Qiyuan; China	Sunisa Lee; United States
2028 Los Angeles			

==== Vault ====
Games	Gold	Silver	Bronze
1952 Helsinki	Ekaterina Kalinchuk; Soviet Union	Maria Gorokhovskaya; Soviet Union	Galina Minaicheva; Soviet Union
1956 Melbourne	Larisa Latynina; Soviet Union	Tamara Manina; Soviet Union	Olga Lemhényi-Tass; Hungary
1956 Melbourne	Larisa Latynina; Soviet Union	Tamara Manina; Soviet Union	Ann-Sofi Pettersson; Sweden
1960 Rome	Margarita Nikolaeva; Soviet Union	Sofia Muratova; Soviet Union	Larisa Latynina; Soviet Union
1964 Tokyo	Věra Čáslavská; Czechoslovakia	Larisa Latynina; Soviet Union	none awarded
1964 Tokyo	Věra Čáslavská; Czechoslovakia	Birgit Radochla; United Team of Germany	none awarded
1968 Mexico City	Věra Čáslavská; Czechoslovakia	Erika Zuchold; East Germany	Zinaida Voronina; Soviet Union
1972 Munich	Karin Janz; East Germany	Erika Zuchold; East Germany	Ludmilla Tourischeva; Soviet Union
1976 Montreal	Nellie Kim; Soviet Union	Carola Dombeck; East Germany	none awarded
1976 Montreal	Nellie Kim; Soviet Union	Ludmilla Tourischeva; Soviet Union	none awarded
1980 Moscow	Natalia Shaposhnikova; Soviet Union	Steffi Kräker; East Germany	Melita Ruhn; Romania
1984 Los Angeles	Ecaterina Szabo; Romania	Mary Lou Retton; United States	Lavinia Agache; Romania
1988 Seoul	Svetlana Boginskaya; Soviet Union	Gabriela Potorac; Romania	Daniela Silivaș; Romania
1992 Barcelona	Lavinia Miloșovici; Romania	none awarded	Tatiana Lysenko; Unified Team
1992 Barcelona	Henrietta Ónodi; Hungary	none awarded	Tatiana Lysenko; Unified Team
1996 Atlanta	Simona Amânar; Romania	Mo Huilan; China	Gina Gogean; Romania
2000 Sydney	Elena Zamolodchikova; Russia	Andreea Răducan; Romania	Yekaterina Lobaznyuk; Russia
2004 Athens	Monica Roșu; Romania	Annia Hatch; United States	Anna Pavlova; Russia
2008 Beijing	Hong Un-jong; North Korea	Oksana Chusovitina; Germany	Cheng Fei; China
2012 London	Sandra Izbașa; Romania	McKayla Maroney; United States	Maria Paseka; Russia
2016 Rio de Janeiro	Simone Biles; United States	Maria Paseka; Russia	Giulia Steingruber; Switzerland
2020 Tokyo	Rebeca Andrade; Brazil	MyKayla Skinner; United States	Yeo Seo-jeong; South Korea
2024 Paris	Simone Biles; United States	Rebeca Andrade; Brazil	Jade Carey; United States
2028 Los Angeles			

==== All-around, mixed team ====
Games	Gold	Silver	Bronze
2028 Los Angeles			

=== Discontinued event ===
==== Portable apparatus, team ====
Games	Gold	Silver	Bronze
1952 Helsinki	Sweden; Evy Berggren; Vanja Blomberg; Karin Lindberg; Hjördis Nordin; Ann-Sofi Pettersson; Göta Pettersson; Gun Roring; Ingrid Sandahl	Soviet Union; Nina Bocharova; Pelageya Danilova; Maria Gorokhovskaya; Medea Jugeli; Ekaterina Kalinchuk; Galina Minaicheva; Galina Shamrai; Galina Urbanovich	Hungary; Andrea Bodó; Irén Daruházi-Karcsics; Erzsébet Gulyás-Köteles; Ágnes Keleti; Margit Korondi; Mária Kövi-Zalai; Edit Perényi-Weckinger; Olga Lemhényi-Tass
1956 Melbourne	Hungary; Erzsébet Gulyás-Köteles; Ágnes Keleti; Alice Kertész; Margit Korondi; Olga Lemhényi-Tass; Andrea Molnár-Bodó	Sweden; Evy Berggren; Doris Hedberg; Maud Karlén; Karin Lindberg; Ann-Sofi Pettersson; Eva Rönström	Poland; Dorota Horzonek-Jokiel; Natalia Kot; Danuta Nowak-Stachow; Helena Rakoczy; Lidia Szczerbińska; Barbara Wilk-Ślizowska
1956 Melbourne	Hungary; Erzsébet Gulyás-Köteles; Ágnes Keleti; Alice Kertész; Margit Korondi; Olga Lemhényi-Tass; Andrea Molnár-Bodó	Sweden; Evy Berggren; Doris Hedberg; Maud Karlén; Karin Lindberg; Ann-Sofi Pettersson; Eva Rönström	Soviet Union; Polina Astakhova; Lyudmila Yegorova; Lidia Kalinina; Larisa Latynina; Tamara Manina; Sofia Muratova

== Rhythmic gymnastics ==
=== All-around, individual ===
Games	Gold	Silver	Bronze
1984 Los Angeles	Lori Fung; Canada	Doina Stăiculescu; Romania	Regina Weber; West Germany
1988 Seoul	Marina Lobatch; Soviet Union	Adriana Dunavska; Bulgaria	Alexandra Timoshenko; Soviet Union
1992 Barcelona	Alexandra Timoshenko; Unified Team	Carolina Pascual; Spain	Oksana Skaldina; Unified Team
1996 Atlanta	Kateryna Serebrianska; Ukraine	Yana Batyrshina; Russia	Olena Vitrychenko; Ukraine
2000 Sydney	Yulia Barsukova; Russia	Yulia Raskina; Belarus	Alina Kabaeva; Russia
2004 Athens	Alina Kabaeva; Russia	Irina Tchachina; Russia	Anna Bessonova; Ukraine
2008 Beijing	Evgeniya Kanaeva; Russia	Inna Zhukova; Belarus	Anna Bessonova; Ukraine
2012 London	Evgeniya Kanaeva; Russia	Darya Dmitriyeva; Russia	Liubov Charkashyna; Belarus
2016 Rio de Janeiro	Margarita Mamun; Russia	Yana Kudryavtseva; Russia	Ganna Rizatdinova; Ukraine
2020 Tokyo	Linoy Ashram; Israel	Dina Averina; ROC	Alina Harnasko; Belarus
2024 Paris	Darja Varfolomeev; Germany	Boryana Kaleyn; Bulgaria	Sofia Raffaeli; Italy
2028 Los Angeles			

=== All-around, group ===
Games	Gold	Silver	Bronze
1996 Atlanta	Spain; Marta Baldó; Nuria Cabanillas; Estela Giménez; Lorena Guréndez; Tania Lamarca; Estíbaliz Martínez	Bulgaria; Ina Deltcheva; Valentina Kevliyan; Maria Koleva; Maya Tabakova; Ivelina Taleva; Vyara Vatashka	Russia; Yevgeniya Bochkaryova; Irina Dzyuba; Yuliya Ivanova; Yelena Krivoshey; Olga Shtyrenko; Angelina Yushkova
2000 Sydney	Russia; Irina Belova; Natalia Lavrova; Mariya Netesova; Yelena Shalamova; Vera Shimanskaya; Irina Zilber	Belarus; Tatyana Ananko; Tatyana Belan; Anna Glazkova; Irina Ilyenkova; Maria Lazuk; Olga Puzhevich	Greece; Eirini Aindili; Evangelia Christodoulou; Maria Georgatou; Zacharoula Karyami; Charikleia Pantazi; Anna Pollatou
2004 Athens	Russia; Olesya Belugina; Olga Glatskikh; Tatiana Kurbakova; Natalia Lavrova; Elena Murzina; Yelena Posevina	Italy; Elisa Blanchi; Fabrizia D'Ottavio; Marinella Falca; Daniela Masseroni; Elisa Santoni; Laura Vernizzi	Bulgaria; Eleonora Kezhova; Zhaneta Ilieva; Zornitsa Marinova; Kristina Rangelova; Galina Tancheva; Vladislava Tancheva
2008 Beijing	Russia; Margarita Aliychuk; Anna Gavrilenko; Tatiana Gorbunova; Yelena Posevina; Daria Shkurikhina; Natalia Zuyeva	China; Cai Tongtong; Chou Tao; Lü Yuanyang; Sui Jianshuang; Sun Dan; Zhang Shuo	Belarus; Olesya Babushkina; Anastasia Ivankova; Zinaida Lunina; Glafira Martinovich; Ksenia Sankovich; Alina Tumilovich
2012 London	Russia; Anastasia Bliznyuk; Uliana Donskova; Ksenia Dudkina; Alina Makarenko; Anastasia Nazarenko; Karolina Sevastyanova	Belarus; Maryna Hancharova; Anastasia Ivankova; Nataliya Leshchyk; Aliaksandra Narkevich; Ksenia Sankovich; Alina Tumilovich	Italy; Elisa Blanchi; Romina Laurito; Marta Pagnini; Elisa Santoni; Anzhelika Savrayuk; Andreea Stefanescu
2016 Rio de Janeiro	Russia; Vera Biryukova; Anastasia Bliznyuk; Anastasia Maksimova; Anastasia Tatareva; Maria Tolkacheva	Spain; Sandra Aguilar; Artemi Gavezou; Elena López; Lourdes Mohedano; Alejandra Quereda	Bulgaria; Reneta Kamberova; Lyubomira Kazanova; Mihaela Maevska-Velichkova; Tsvetelina Naydenova; Hristiana Todorova
2020 Tokyo	Bulgaria; Simona Dyankova; Stefani Kiryakova; Madlen Radukanova; Laura Traets; Erika Zafirova	ROC (ROC); Anastasia Bliznyuk; Anastasia Maksimova; Angelina Shkatova; Anastasia Tatareva; Alisa Tishchenko	Italy; Martina Centofanti; Agnese Duranti; Alessia Maurelli; Daniela Mogurean; Martina Santandrea
2024 Paris	China; Guo Qiqi; Hao Ting; Huang Zhangjiayang; Wang Lanjing; Ding Xinyi	Israel; Ofir Shaham; Diana Svertsov; Adar Friedmann; Romi Paritzki; Shani Bakanov	Italy; Alessia Maurelli; Martina Centofanti; Agnese Duranti; Daniela Mogurean; Laura Paris
2028 Los Angeles			

== Trampoline ==
=== Individual ===
Games	Gold	Silver	Bronze
2000 Sydney	Irina Karavayeva; Russia	Oxana Tsyhuleva; Ukraine	Karen Cockburn; Canada
2004 Athens	Anna Dogonadze; Germany	Karen Cockburn; Canada	Huang Shanshan; China
2008 Beijing	He Wenna; China	Karen Cockburn; Canada	Ekaterina Khilko; Uzbekistan
2012 London	Rosannagh MacLennan; Canada	Huang Shanshan; China	He Wenna; China
2016 Rio de Janeiro	Rosannagh MacLennan; Canada	Bryony Page; Great Britain	Li Dan; China
2020 Tokyo	Zhu Xueying; China	Liu Lingling; China	Bryony Page; Great Britain
2024 Paris	Bryony Page; Great Britain	Viyaleta Bardzilouskaya; Individual Neutral Athletes	Sophiane Méthot; Canada
2028 Los Angeles			

== See also ==
- List of top Olympic gymnastics medalists
- Artistic gymnastics
- Rhythmic gymnastics
- Trampoline
