= List of 1928 Summer Olympics medal winners =

The 1928 Summer Olympics were held in Amsterdam, Netherlands, from 28 July to 12 August 1928.

== Athletics ==
=== Medal table ===
* Host nation (Netherlands)

Rank	Nation	Gold	Silver	Bronze	Total
1	United States (USA)	9	8	8	25
2	Finland (FIN)	5	5	4	14
3	Canada (CAN)	4	2	2	8
4	Great Britain (GBR)	2	2	1	5
5	Germany (GER)	1	2	6	9
6	Sweden (SWE)	1	2	4	7
7	France (FRA)	1	1	1	3
8	Japan (JPN)	1	1	0	2
9	Ireland (IRL)	1	0	0	1
9	Poland (POL)	1	0	0	1
9	South Africa (RSA)	1	0	0	1
12	Chile (CHI)	0	1	0	1
12	Haiti (HAI)	0	1	0	1
12	Hungary (HUN)	0	1	0	1
12	Netherlands (NED)*	0	1	0	1
16	Norway (NOR)	0	0	1	1
Totals (16 entries)		27	27	27	81

=== Men's events ===
Games	Gold	Silver	Bronze
100 metres	Percy Williams; Canada	Jack London; Great Britain	Georg Lammers; Germany
200 metres	Percy Williams; Canada	Walter Rangeley; Great Britain	Helmut Körnig; Germany
400 metres	Ray Barbuti; United States	James Ball; Canada	Joachim Büchner; Germany
800 metres	Douglas Lowe; Great Britain	Erik Byléhn; Sweden	Hermann Engelhard; Germany
1500 metres	Harri Larva; Finland	Jules Ladoumegue; France	Eino Purje; Finland
5000 metres	Ville Ritola; Finland	Paavo Nurmi; Finland	Edvin Wide; Sweden
10,000 metres	Paavo Nurmi; Finland	Ville Ritola; Finland	Edvin Wide; Sweden
110 metres hurdles	Sydney Atkinson; South Africa	Steve Anderson; United States	John Collier; United States
400 metres hurdles	David Burghley; Great Britain	Frank Cuhel; United States	Morgan Taylor; United States
3000 metres steeplechase	Toivo Loukola; Finland	Paavo Nurmi; Finland	Ove Andersen; Finland
4 × 100 metres relay	United States; Frank Wykoff; James Quinn; Charles Borah; Henry Russell	Germany; Georg Lammers; Richard Corts; Hubert Houben; Helmut Körnig	Great Britain; Cyril Gill; Edward Smouha; Walter Rangeley; Jack London
4 × 400 metres relay	United States; George Baird; Fred Alderman; Emerson Spencer; Ray Barbuti	Germany; Otto Neumann; Harry Werner Storz; Richard Krebs; Hermann Engelhard	Canada; James Ball; Stanley Glover; Phil Edwards; Alex Wilson
Marathon	Boughera El Ouafi; France	Manuel Plaza; Chile	Martti Marttelin; Finland
High jump	Bob King; United States	Benjamin Hedges; United States	Claude Ménard; France
Pole vault	Sabin Carr; United States	William Droegemuller; United States	Charles McGinnis; United States
Long jump	Edward Hamm; United States	Silvio Cator; Haiti	Alfred Bates; United States
Triple jump	Mikio Oda; Japan	Levi Casey; United States	Vilho Tuulos; Finland
Shot put	John Kuck; United States	Herman Brix; United States	Emil Hirschfeld; Germany
Discus throw	Bud Houser; United States	Antero Kivi; Finland	James Corson; United States
Hammer throw	Pat O'Callaghan; Ireland	Ossian Skiöld; Sweden	Edmund Black; United States
Javelin throw	Erik Lundqvist; Sweden	Béla Szepes; Hungary	Olav Sunde; Norway
Decathlon	Paavo Yrjölä; Finland	Akilles Järvinen; Finland	Ken Doherty; United States

=== Women's events ===
Games	Gold	Silver	Bronze
100 metres	Betty Robinson; United States	Bobbie Rosenfeld; Canada	Ethel Smith; Canada
800 metres	Lina Radke; Germany	Kinue Hitomi; Japan	Inga Gentzel; Sweden
4 × 100 metres relay	Canada; Myrtle Cook; Ethel Smith; Bobbie Rosenfeld; Jane Bell	United States; Jessie Cross; Loretta McNeil; Betty Robinson; Mary Washburn	Germany; Anni Holdmann; Leni Junker; Rosa Kellner; Leni Schmidt
High jump	Ethel Catherwood; Canada	Lien Gisolf; Netherlands	Mildred Wiley; United States
Discus throw	Halina Konopacka; Poland	Lillian Copeland; United States	Ruth Svedberg; Sweden

== Boxing ==
=== Medal table ===
* Host nation (Netherlands)

Rank	Nation	Gold	Silver	Bronze	Total
1	Italy	3	0	1	4
2	Argentina	2	2	0	4
3	Netherlands*	1	0	1	2
4	Hungary	1	0	0	1
4	New Zealand	1	0	0	1
6	United States	0	2	1	3
7	Sweden	0	1	1	2
8	Czechoslovakia	0	1	0	1
8	France	0	1	0	1
8	Germany	0	1	0	1
11	Belgium	0	0	1	1
11	Canada	0	0	1	1
11	Denmark	0	0	1	1
11	South Africa	0	0	1	1
Totals (14 entries)		8	8	8	24

=== Medalists ===
Games	Gold	Silver	Bronze
Flyweight (−50.8 kg / 112 lb)	Antal Kocsis; Hungary	Armand Apell; France	Carlo Cavagnoli; Italy
Bantamweight (−53.5 kg / 118 lb)	Vittorio Tamagnini; Italy	John Daley; United States	Harry Isaacs; South Africa
Featherweight (−57.2 kg / 126 lb)	Bep van Klaveren; Netherlands	Víctor Peralta; Argentina	Harold Devine; United States
Lightweight (−61.2 kg / 135 lb)	Carlo Orlandi; Italy	Stephen Halaiko; United States	Gunnar Berggren; Sweden
Welterweight (−66.7 kg / 147 lb)	Ted Morgan; New Zealand	Raúl Landini; Argentina	Raymond Smillie; Canada
Middleweight (−72.6 kg / 160 lb)	Piero Toscani; Italy	Jan Heřmánek; Czechoslovakia	Léonard Steyaert; Belgium
Light heavyweight (−79.4 kg / 175 lb)	Víctor Avendaño; Argentina	Ernst Pistulla; Germany	Karel Miljon; Netherlands
Heavyweight (over 79.4 kg/175 lb)	Arturo Rodríguez Jurado; Argentina	Nils Ramm; Sweden	Michael Michaelsen; Denmark

== Cycling ==
=== Medal table ===
* Host nation (Netherlands)

Rank	Nation	Gold	Silver	Bronze	Total
1	Denmark	3	0	1	4
2	Netherlands*	1	3	0	4
3	France	1	0	0	1
3	Italy	1	0	0	1
5	Great Britain	0	3	1	4
6	Sweden	0	0	2	2
7	Australia	0	0	1	1
7	Germany	0	0	1	1
Totals (8 entries)		6	6	6	18

=== Road cycling ===
Games	Gold	Silver	Bronze
Individual time trial	Henry Hansen; Denmark	Frank Southall; Great Britain	Gösta Carlsson; Sweden
Team time trial	Denmark; Henry Hansen; Orla Jørgensen; Leo Nielsen	Great Britain; Jack Lauterwasser; John Middleton; Frank Southall	Sweden; Gösta Carlsson; Erik Jansson; Georg Johnsson

=== Track cycling ===
Games	Gold	Silver	Bronze
Team pursuit	Italy; Cesare Facciani; Giacomo Gaioni; Mario Lusiani; Luigi Tasselli	Netherlands; Johannes Maas; Piet van der Horst; Janus Braspennincx; Jan Pijnenburg	Great Britain; George Southall; Harry Wyld; Leonard Wyld; Percy Wyld
Sprint	Roger Beaufrand; France	Antoine Mazairac; Netherlands	Willy Hansen; Denmark
Tandem	Netherlands; Bernhard Leene; Daan van Dijk	Great Britain; Ernest Chambers; John Sibbit	Germany; Hans Bernhardt; Karl Köther
Track time trial	Willy Hansen; Denmark	Gerard Bosch van Drakestein; Netherlands	Dunc Gray; Australia

== Diving ==
=== Medal table ===
Rank	Nation	Gold	Silver	Bronze	Total
1	United States	4	3	2	9
2	Egypt	0	1	1	2
3	Sweden	0	0	1	1
Totals (3 entries)		4	4	4	12

=== Men's events ===
Event	Gold	Silver	Bronze
3 m springboard	Pete Desjardins; United States	Michael Galitzen; United States	Farid Simaika; Egypt
10 m platform	Pete Desjardins; United States	Farid Simaika; Egypt	Michael Galitzen; United States

=== Women's events ===
Event	Gold	Silver	Bronze
3 m springboard	Helen Meany; United States	Dorothy Poynton; United States	Georgia Coleman; United States
10 m platform	Elizabeth Becker-Pinkston; United States	Georgia Coleman; United States	Laura Sjöqvist; Sweden

== Equestrian events ==
=== Medal table ===
* Host nation (Netherlands)

Rank	Nation	Gold	Silver	Bronze	Total
1	Netherlands*	2	1	1	4
2	Germany	2	0	1	3
3	Czechoslovakia	1	0	0	1
3	Spain	1	0	0	1
5	France	0	2	0	2
6	Sweden	0	1	2	3
7	Poland	0	1	1	2
8	Norway	0	1	0	1
9	Switzerland	0	0	1	1
Totals (9 entries)		6	6	6	18

=== Medalists ===
Games	Gold	Silver	Bronze
Individual dressage	Carl Freiherr von Langen on Draufgänger (GER)	Charles Marion on Linon (FRA)	Ragnar Olson on Günstling (SWE)
Team dressage	Germany; Carl Freiherr von Langen on Draufgänger; Hermann Linkenbach on Gimpel; Eugen Freiherr von Lotzbeck on Caracalla	Sweden; Ragnar Olson on Günstling; Janne Lundblad on Blackmar; Carl Bonde on Ingo	Netherlands; Jan van Reede on Hans; Pierre Versteegh on His Excellence; Gerard le Heux on Valérine
Individual eventing	Charles Pahud de Mortanges on Marcroix (NED)	Gerard de Kruijff on Va-T'en (NED)	Bruno Neumann on Ilja (GER)
Team eventing	Netherlands; Charles Pahud de Mortanges on Marcroix; Gerard de Kruijff on Va-T'en; Adolph van der Voort van Zijp on Silver Piece	Norway; Bjart Ording on And Over; Arthur Qvist on Hidalgo; Eugen Johansen on Baby	Poland; Michał Antoniewicz on Moja Miła; Józef Trenkwald on Lwi Pazur; Karol Rómmel on Doneuse
Individual jumping	František Ventura and Eliot (TCH)	Pierre Bertran de Balanda and Papillon (FRA)	Charles-Gustave Kuhn and Pepita (SUI)
Team jumping	Spain; Count of Casa Loja and Zapatazo; Marquess of Trujillos and Zalamero; Julio García Fernández de los Ríos and Revistade	Poland; Kazimierz Gzowski and Mylord; Kazimierz Szosland and Ali; Michał Antoniewicz and Readgleadt	Sweden; Karl Hansen and Gerold; Carl Björnstjerna and Kornett; Ernst Hallberg and Loke

== Fencing ==
=== Medal table ===
Rank	Nation	Gold	Silver	Bronze	Total
1	France	2	3	0	5
2	Italy	2	1	2	5
3	Hungary	2	1	0	3
4	Germany	1	1	1	3
5	Great Britain	0	1	0	1
6	Argentina	0	0	1	1
6	Poland	0	0	1	1
6	Portugal	0	0	1	1
6	United States	0	0	1	1
Totals (9 entries)		7	7	7	21

=== Men's events ===
Event	Gold	Silver	Bronze
Individual épée	Lucien Gaudin; France	Georges Buchard; France	George Calnan; United States
Team épée	Italy; Giulio Basletta; Marcello Bertinetti; Giancarlo Cornaggia-Medici; Carlo Agostoni; Renzo Minoli; Franco Riccardi	France; Georges Buchard; Gaston Amson; Émile Cornic; Bernard Schmetz; René Barbier	Portugal; Paulo Leal; Mário de Noronha; Jorge de Paiva; Frederico Paredes; João Sassetti; Henrique da Silveira
Individual foil	Lucien Gaudin; France	Erwin Casmir; Germany	Giulio Gaudini; Italy
Team foil	Italy; Ugo Pignotti; Giulio Gaudini; Giorgio Pessina; Gioachino Guaragna; Oreste Puliti; Giorgio Chiavacci	France; Philippe Cattiau; Roger Ducret; André Labattut; Lucien Gaudin; Raymond Flacher; André Gaboriaud	Argentina; Roberto Larraz; Raúl Anganuzzi; Luis Lucchetti; Héctor Lucchetti; Carmelo Camet
Individual sabre	Ödön Tersztyánszky; Hungary	Attila Petschauer; Hungary	Bino Bini; Italy
Team sabre	Hungary; Ödön von Tersztyánszky; János Garay; Attila Petschauer; József Rády; Sándor Gombos; Gyula Glykais	Italy; Bino Bini; Oreste Puliti; Giulio Sarrocchi; Renato Anselmi; Emilio Salafia; Gustavo Marzi	Poland; Adam Papée; Tadeusz Friedrich; Kazimierz Laskowski; Władysław Segda; Aleksander Małecki; Jerzy Zabielski

=== Women's event ===
Event	Gold	Silver	Bronze
Individual foil	Helene Mayer; Germany	Muriel Freeman; Great Britain	Olga Oelkers; Germany

== Field hockey ==
=== Medal table ===
* Host nation (Netherlands)

Rank	Nation	Gold	Silver	Bronze	Total
1	India	1	0	0	1
2	Netherlands*	0	1	0	1
3	Germany	0	0	1	1
Totals (3 entries)		1	1	1	3

=== Medalists ===
Games	Gold	Silver	Bronze
Men's	India; Richard Allen; Dhyan Chand; Michael Gateley; William Goodsir-Cullen; Leslie Hammond; Feroze Khan; George Marthins; Rex Norris; Broome Pinniger; Michael Rocque; Frederic Seaman; Ali Shaukat; Jaipal Singh (Captain); Shahzada Muhammad Yusuf Kehar Singh Gill	Netherlands; Jan Ankerman; Jan Brand; Rein de Waal; Emile Duson; Gerrit Jannink; Adriaan Katte; August Kop; Ab Tresling; Paul van de Rovaart; Robert van der Veen; Haas Visser 't Hooft C. J. J. Hardebeck; T. F. Hubrecht; G. Leembruggen; H. J. L. Mangelaar Meertens; Otto Muller von Czernicki; W. J. van Citters; C. J. van der Hagen; Tonny van Lierop; J. J. van Tienhoven van den Bogaard; J. M. van Voorst van Beest; N. Wenholt	Germany; Bruno Boche; Georg Brunner; Heinz Förstendorf; Erwin Franzkowiak; Werner Freyberg; Theodor Haag; Hans Haußmann; Kurt Haverbeck; Aribert Heymann; Herbert Hobein; Fritz Horn; Karl-Heinz Irmer; Herbert Kemmer; Herbert Müller; Werner Proft; Gerd Strantzen; Rolf Wollner; Heinz Wöltje; Erich Zander Fritz Lincke; Heinz Schäfer; Kurt Weiß

Note: The players above the line played at least one game in this tournament, the players below the line were probably only squad members. Nevertheless, the International Olympic Committee medal database exclusively credits them all as medalists. If or why they could have received medals is uncertain. However the National Olympic Committee of the Netherlands does not even show the Dutch players as competitors.

== Football ==
=== Medal table ===
Rank	Nation	Gold	Silver	Bronze	Total
1	Uruguay	1	0	0	1
2	Argentina	0	1	0	1
3	Italy	0	0	1	1
Totals (3 entries)		1	1	1	3

=== Medalists ===
Event	Gold	Silver	Bronze
Men's	Uruguay; José Leandro Andrade; Peregrino Anselmo; Pedro Arispe; Juan Arremón; Venancio Bartibás; Fausto Batignani; René Borjas; Antonio Campolo; Adhemar Canavesi; Héctor Castro; Pedro Cea; Lorenzo Fernández; Roberto Figueroa; Álvaro Gestido; Andrés Mazali; Ángel Melogno; José Nasazzi; Pedro Petrone; Juan Piriz; Héctor Scarone; Domingo Tejera; Santos Urdinarán	Argentina; Ludovico Bidoglio; Ángel Bossio; Saúl Calandra; Alfredo Carricaberry; Roberto Cherro; Octavio Díaz; Juan Evaristo; Manuel Ferreira; Enrique Gainzarain; Alfredo Helman; Segundo Luna; Ángel Segundo Medici; Luis Monti; Pedro Ochoa; Rodolfo Orlandini; Raimundo Orsi; Fernando Paternoster; Feliciano Perducca; Natalio Perinetti; Domingo Tarasconi; Luis Weihmuller; Adolfo Zumelzú	Italy; Elvio Banchero; Virgilio Felice Levratto; Pietro Pastore; Gino Rossetti; Attilio Ferraris; Enrico Rivolta; Felice Gasperi; Alfredo Pitto; Pietro Genovesi; Antonio Janni; Fulvio Bernardini; Silvio Pietroboni; Andrea Viviano; Delfo Bellini; Umberto Caligaris; Virginio Rosetta; Gianpiero Combi; Giovanni De Prà; Adolfo Baloncieri; Mario Magnozzi; Angelo Schiavio; Valentino Degani

== Gymnastics ==
=== Medal table ===
* Host nation (Netherlands)

Rank	Nation	Gold	Silver	Bronze	Total
1	Switzerland	5	2	2	9
2	Czechoslovakia	1	3	1	5
3	Yugoslavia	1	1	3	5
4	Netherlands*	1	0	0	1
5	Italy	0	2	0	2
6	Finland	0	0	1	1
6	Great Britain	0	0	1	1
Totals (7 entries)		8	8	8	24

=== Men's events ===
Games	Gold	Silver	Bronze
Individual all-around	Georges Miez; Switzerland	Hermann Hänggi; Switzerland	Leon Štukelj; Yugoslavia
Team all-around	Switzerland; Hans Grieder; August Güttinger; Hermann Hänggi; Eugen Mack; Georges Miez; Otto Pfister; Eduard Steinemann; Melchior Wezel	Czechoslovakia; Josef Effenberger; Jan Gajdoš; Jan Koutný; Emanuel Löffler; Bedřich Šupčík; Ladislav Tikal; Ladislav Vácha; Václav Veselý	Yugoslavia; Edvard Antosiewicz; Dragutin Cioti; Stane Derganc; Boris Gregorka; Anton Malej; Ivan Porenta; Josip Primožič; Leon Štukelj
Horizontal bar	Georges Miez; Switzerland	Romeo Neri; Italy	Eugen Mack; Switzerland
Parallel bars	Ladislav Vácha; Czechoslovakia	Josip Primožič; Yugoslavia	Hermann Hänggi; Switzerland
Pommel horse	Hermann Hänggi; Switzerland	Georges Miez; Switzerland	Heikki Savolainen; Finland
Rings	Leon Štukelj; Yugoslavia	Ladislav Vácha; Czechoslovakia	Emanuel Löffler; Czechoslovakia
Vault	Eugen Mack; Switzerland	Emanuel Löffler; Czechoslovakia	Stane Derganc; Yugoslavia

=== Women's event ===
Games	Gold	Silver	Bronze
Team all-around	Netherlands; Estella Agsteribbe; Jacomina van den Berg; Alida van den Bos; Petronella Burgerhof; Elka de Levie; Helena Nordheim; Ans Polak; Petronella van Randwijk; Hendrika van Rumt; Jud Simons; Jacoba Stelma; Anna van der Vegt	Italy; Bianca Ambrosetti; Lavinia Gianoni; Luigina Giavotti; Virginia Giorgi; Germana Malabarba; Carla Marangoni; Luigina Perversi; Diana Pissavini; Luisa Tanzini; Carolina Tronconi; Ines Vercesi; Rita Vittadini	Great Britain; Annie Broadbent; Lucy Desmond; Margaret Hartley; Amy Jagger; Isobel Judd; Jessie Kite; Marjorie Moreman; Edith Pickles; Ethel Seymour; Ada Smith; Hilda Smith; Doris Woods

== Modern pentathlon ==
=== Medal table ===
Rank	Nation	Gold	Silver	Bronze	Total
1	Sweden	1	1	0	2
2	Germany	0	0	1	1
Totals (2 entries)		1	1	1	3

=== Medalists ===
Event	Gold	Silver	Bronze
Individual	Sven Thofelt; Sweden	Bo Lindman; Sweden	Helmuth Kahl; Germany

== Rowing ==
=== Medal table ===
Rank	Nation	Gold	Silver	Bronze	Total
1	United States	2	2	1	5
2	Great Britain	1	2	1	4
3	Switzerland	1	1	0	2
4	Italy	1	0	1	2
5	Australia	1	0	0	1
5	Germany	1	0	0	1
7	Canada	0	1	1	2
8	France	0	1	0	1
9	Austria	0	0	1	1
9	Belgium	0	0	1	1
9	Poland	0	0	1	1
Totals (11 entries)		7	7	7	21

=== Medalists ===
Event	Gold	Silver	Bronze
Single sculls	Bobby Pearce; Australia	Ken Myers; United States	David Collet; Great Britain
Double sculls	United States; Paul Costello; Charles McIlvaine	Canada; Joseph Wright Jr. Jack Guest	Austria; Leo Losert; Viktor Flessl
Coxless pair	Germany; Kurt Moeschter; Bruno Müller	Great Britain; Terence O'Brien; Robert Nisbet	United States; Paul McDowell; John Schmitt
Coxed pair	Switzerland; Hans Schöchlin; Karl Schöchlin; Hans Bourquin	France; Armand Marcelle; Édouard Marcelle; Henri Préaux	Belgium; Léon Flament; François de Coninck; Georges Anthony
Coxless four	Great Britain; John Lander; Michael Warriner; Richard Beesly; Edward Vaughan Bevan	United States; Charles Karle; William Miller; George Healis; Ernest Bayer	Italy; Cesare Rossi; Pietro Freschi; Umberto Bonadè; Paolo Gennari
Coxed four	Italy; Valerio Perentin; Giliante D'Este; Nicolò Vittori; Giovanni Delise; Renato Petronio	Switzerland; Ernst Haas; Joseph Meyer; Otto Bucher; Karl Schwegler; Fritz Bösch	Poland; Franciszek Bronikowski; Edmund Jankowski; Leon Birkholc; Bernard Ormanowski; Bolesław Drewek
Eight	United States; Marvin Stalder; John Brinck; Francis Frederick; William Thompson; William Dally; James Workman; Hubert A. Caldwell; Peter Donlon; Donald Blessing	Great Britain; Jamie Hamilton; Guy Oliver Nickalls; John Badcock; Donald Gollan; Harold Lane; Gordon Killick; Jack Beresford; Harold West; Arthur Sulley	Canada; Frederick Hedges; Frank Fiddes; John Hand; Herbert Richardson; Jack Murdoch; Athol Meech; Edgar Norris; William Ross; John Donnelly

== Sailing ==
=== Medal table ===
* Host nation (Netherlands)

Rank	Nation	Gold	Silver	Bronze	Total
1	Norway	1	1	0	2
2	Sweden	1	0	1	2
3	France	1	0	0	1
4	Denmark	0	1	0	1
4	Netherlands*	0	1	0	1
6	Estonia	0	0	1	1
6	Finland	0	0	1	1
Totals (7 entries)		3	3	3	9

=== Medalists ===
Games	Gold	Silver	Bronze
12' dinghy	Sven Thorell; Sweden	Henrik Robert; Norway	Bertil Broman; Finland
6 metre	Norway; Johan Anker; Erik Anker; Håkon Bryhn; Crown Prince Olav	Denmark; Vilhelm Vett; Aage Høy-Petersen; Niels Otto Møller; Peter Schlütter	Estonia; Nikolai Vekšin; Andreas Faehlmann; Georg Faehlmann; Eberhard Vogdt; William von Wirén
8 metre	France; Donatien Bouché; André Derrien; Virginie Hériot; André Lesauvage; Jean Lesieur; Carl de la Sablière	Netherlands; Johannes van Hoolwerff; Lambertus Doedes; Hendrik Kersken; Cornelis van Staveren; Gerard de Vries Lentsch; Maarten de Wit	Sweden; Clarence Hammar; Tore Holm; Carl Sandblom; John Sandblom; Philip Sandblom; Wilhelm Törsleff

== Swimming ==
=== Medal table ===
* Host nation (Netherlands)

Rank	Nation	Gold	Silver	Bronze	Total
1	United States	6	2	3	11
2	Netherlands*	1	2	0	3
3	Germany	1	1	1	3
3	Japan	1	1	1	3
5	Sweden	1	0	1	2
6	Argentina	1	0	0	1
7	Great Britain	0	2	2	4
8	Australia	0	2	0	2
9	Hungary	0	1	0	1
10	Canada	0	0	1	1
10	Philippines	0	0	1	1
10	South Africa	0	0	1	1
Totals (12 entries)		11	11	11	33

=== Men's events ===
Games	Gold	Silver	Bronze
100 m freestyle	Johnny Weissmuller; United States	István Bárány; Hungary	Katsuo Takaishi; Japan
400 m freestyle	Alberto Zorrilla; Argentina	Boy Charlton; Australia	Arne Borg; Sweden
1500 m freestyle	Arne Borg; Sweden	Boy Charlton; Australia	Buster Crabbe; United States
100 m backstroke	George Kojac; United States	Walter Laufer; United States	Paul Wyatt; United States
200 m breaststroke	Yoshiyuki Tsuruta; Japan	Erich Rademacher; Germany	Teófilo Yldefonso; Philippines
4 × 200 m freestyle relay	United States; Austin Clapp; George Kojac; Walter Laufer; Johnny Weissmuller	Japan; Nobuo Arai; Tokuhei Sada; Katsuo Takaishi; Hiroshi Yoneyama	Canada; Garnet Ault; Munroe Bourne; Walter Spence; James Thompson

=== Women's events ===
Games	Gold	Silver	Bronze
100 m freestyle	Albina Osipowich; United States	Eleanor Garatti; United States	Joyce Cooper; Great Britain
400 m freestyle	Martha Norelius; United States	Marie Braun; Netherlands	Josephine McKim; United States
100 m backstroke	Marie Braun; Netherlands	Ellen King; Great Britain	Joyce Cooper; Great Britain
200 m breaststroke	Hilde Schrader; Germany	Marie Baron; Netherlands	Charlotte Mühe; Germany
4 × 100 m freestyle relay	United States; Eleanor Garatti; Adelaide Lambert; Martha Norelius; Albina Osipowich	Great Britain; Joyce Cooper; Ellen King; Cissie Stewart; Iris Tanner	South Africa; Mary Bedford; Freddie van der Goes; Rhoda Rennie; Kathleen Russell

== Water polo ==
=== Medal table ===
Rank	Nation	Gold	Silver	Bronze	Total
1	Germany	1	0	0	1
2	Hungary	0	1	0	1
3	France	0	0	1	1
Totals (3 entries)		1	1	1	3

=== Medalists ===
Event	Gold	Silver	Bronze
Men's	Germany; Heinrich Atmer; Max Amann; Karl Bähre; Emil Benecke; Johann Blank; Otto Cordes; Fritz Gunst; Otto Kühne; Karl-Heinz Protze; Erich Rademacher; Joachim Rademacher	Hungary; István Barta; György Bródy; Oszkar Csorba; László Czele; Olivér Halassy; Márton Homonnai; Sándor Ivády; Alajos Keserű; Ferenc Keserű; József Vértesy; János Wenk	France; Émile Bulteel; Henri Cuvelier; Paul Dujardin; Jules Keignaert; Henri Padou; Ernest Rogez; Albert Thévenon; Achille Tribouillet; Albert Vandeplancke

== Weightlifting ==
=== Medal table ===
* Host nation (Netherlands)

Rank	Nation	Gold	Silver	Bronze	Total
1	Germany	2	0	1	3
2	Austria	2	0	0	2
3	France	1	1	1	3
4	Egypt	1	0	0	1
5	Italy	0	2	0	2
6	Estonia	0	1	0	1
7	Netherlands*	0	0	2	2
8	Czechoslovakia	0	0	1	1
Totals (8 entries)		6	4	5	15

=== Medalists ===
Games	Gold	Silver	Bronze
60 kg	Franz Andrysek; Austria	Pierino Gabetti; Italy	Hans Wölpert; Germany
67.5 kg	Hans Haas; Austria	none awarded (as there was a tie for gold)	Fernand Arnout; France
67.5 kg	Kurt Helbig; Germany	none awarded (as there was a tie for gold)	Fernand Arnout; France
75 kg	Roger François; France	Carlo Galimberti; Italy	Guus Scheffer; Netherlands
82.5 kg	El Sayed Nosseir; Egypt	Louis Hostin; France	Jan Verheijen; Netherlands
+82.5 kg	Josef Strassberger; Germany	Arnold Luhaäär; Estonia	Jaroslav Skobla; Czechoslovakia

== Wrestling ==
=== Medal table ===
Rank	Nation	Gold	Silver	Bronze	Total
1	Finland	3	3	3	9
2	Sweden	3	1	0	4
3	Estonia	2	0	1	3
4	Germany	1	2	1	4
5	Switzerland	1	1	1	3
6	Hungary	1	1	0	2
6	United States	1	1	0	2
8	Egypt	1	0	0	1
9	Canada	0	1	2	3
9	France	0	1	2	3
11	Belgium	0	1	0	1
11	Czechoslovakia	0	1	0	1
13	Italy	0	0	2	2
14	Great Britain	0	0	1	1
Totals (14 entries)		13	13	13	39

=== Freestyle ===
Games	Gold	Silver	Bronze
Bantamweight	Kaarlo Mäkinen; Finland	Edmond Spapen; Belgium	James Trifunov; Canada
Featherweight	Allie Morrison; United States	Kustaa Pihlajamäki; Finland	Hans Minder; Switzerland
Lightweight	Osvald Käpp; Estonia	Charles Pacôme; France	Eino Augusti Leino; Finland
Welterweight	Arvo Haavisto; Finland	Lloyd Appleton; United States	Maurice Letchford; Canada
Middleweight	Ernst Kyburz; Switzerland	Donald Stockton; Canada	Samuel Rabin; Great Britain
Light Heavyweight	Thure Sjöstedt; Sweden	Arnold Bögli; Switzerland	Henri Lefèbre; France
Heavyweight	Johan Richthoff; Sweden	Aukusti Sihvola; Finland	Edmond Dame; France

=== Greco-Roman ===
Games	Gold	Silver	Bronze
Bantamweight	Kurt Leucht; Germany	Jindrich Maudr; Czechoslovakia	Giovanni Gozzi; Italy
Featherweight	Voldemar Väli; Estonia	Eric Malmberg; Sweden	Gerolamo Quaglia; Italy
Lightweight	Lajos Keresztes; Hungary	Eduard Sperling; Germany	Edvard Westerlund; Finland
Middleweight	Väinö Kokkinen; Finland	László Papp; Hungary	Albert Kusnets; Estonia
Light Heavyweight	Ibrahim Moustafa; Egypt	Adolf Rieger; Germany	Onni Pellinen; Finland
Heavyweight	Rudolf Svensson; Sweden	Hjalmar Nyström; Finland	Georg Gehring; Germany
