= Gymnastics at the 1928 Summer Olympics – Women's artistic team all-around =

Women's team at the Games of the IX Olympiad
- Venue: Olympic Stadium
- Competitors: 60 from 5 nations

Medalists
1st place, gold medalist(s)		Netherlands; Estella Agsteribbe, Jacomina van den Berg, Alida van den Bos, Petronella Burgerhof, Elka de Levie, Helena Nordheim, Ans Polak, Petronella van Randwijk, Hendrika van Rumt, Jud Simons, Jacoba Stelma, Anna van der Vegt
2nd place, silver medalist(s)		Italy; Bianca Ambrosetti, Lavinia Gianoni, Luigina Giavotti, Virginia Giorgi, Germana Malabarba, Carla Marangoni, Luigina Perversi, Diana Pissavini, Luisa Tanzini, Carolina Tronconi, Ines Vercesi, Rita Vittadini
3rd place, bronze medalist(s)		Great Britain; Annie Broadbent, Lucy Desmond, Margaret Hartley, Amy Jagger, Isabel Judd, Jessie Kite, Marjorie Moreman, Edith Pickles, Ethel Seymour, Ada Smith, Hilda Smith, Doris Woods

The women's team event was part of the gymnastics programme at the 1928 Summer Olympics. It was the first Olympic gymnastics event for women, and was the only gymnastics event for women that year. Women's gymnastics would become a permanent event in 1936. Total scores were determined by adding drill, apparatus, and vault components.

Although extensive results detailing the performance of the men gymnasts, both teams and individuals, were published in the Official Olympic Report for these 1928 Summer Olympic Games, only the team results (both combined and with respect to exercise) were published for the women, providing no information whatsoever about the capacities of the various individual women who competed here.

== Results ==
Source: Official results; De Wael

Rank	Nation	Gymnasts	Total
1st place, gold medalist(s)	Netherlands	Estella Agsteribbe, Jacomina van den Berg, Alida van den Bos, Petronella Burgerhof, Elka de Levie, Helena Nordheim, Ans Polak, Petronella van Randwijk, Hendrika van Rumt, Jud Simons, Jacoba Stelma, Anna van der Vegt	316.75
2nd place, silver medalist(s)	Italy	Bianca Ambrosetti, Lavinia Gianoni, Luigina Giavotti, Virginia Giorgi, Germana Malabarba, Carla Marangoni, Luigina Perversi, Diana Pissavini, Luisa Tanzini, Carolina Tronconi, Ines Vercesi, Rita Vittadini	289.00
3rd place, bronze medalist(s)	Great Britain	Annie Broadbent, Lucy Desmond, Margaret Hartley, Amy Jagger, Isabel Judd, Jessie Kite, Marjorie Moreman, Edith Pickles, Ethel Seymour, Ada Smith, Hilda Smith, Doris Woods	258.25
4	Hungary	Valéria Frantz-Herpich, Mária Hámos, Aranka Hennyei, Irén Hennyei, Anna Kael, Margit Kövessi, Margit Pályi, Irén Rudas, Aranka Szeiler, Ilona Szöllõsi, Judit Tóth	256.50
5	France	Mathilde Bataille, Honorine Delescluse, Louise Delescluse, Galuëlle Dhont, Valentine Héméryck, Paulette Houtéer, Georgette Meulebroeck, Renée Oger, Antonie Straeteman, Jeanne Vanoverloop, Berthe Verstraete, Geneviève Vankiersbilck	247.50
