= Netherlands women's national artistic gymnastics team =

Netherlands
- Continental union: European Union of Gymnastics
- National federation: Royal Dutch Gymnastics Union

Olympic Games
- Appearances: 7
- Medals: Gold: 1928

European Games
- Medals: Bronze: 2015

European Championships
- Medals: Bronze: 2018, 2023

The Netherlands women's national artistic gymnastics team represents the Netherlands in FIG international competitions.

== History ==
The Netherlands has participated in the Olympic Games women's team competition seven times. It has won one team medal, a gold in 1928.

== Current senior roster ==
Name	Birthdate and age
Esmee Beekhuis	1 January 2008 (age 18)
Sara van Disseldorp	9 May 2003 (age 23)
Elze Geurts	26 April 1995 (age 31)
Chemene Lamaitre	17 February 2008 (age 18)
Romeny Libeton	1 January 2007 (age 19)
Casey-Jane Meuleman	17 February 2006 (age 20)
Eve de Ruiter	28 May 2002 (age 24)
Mara Slippens	2 September 2006 (age 20)
Floor Slooff	1 September 2006 (age 20)
Eythora Thorsdottir	10 August 1998 (age 28)
Vera van Pol	17 December 1993 (age 32)
Shadé van Oorschot	16 April 2004 (age 22)
Naomi Visser	24 August 2001 (age 25)
Sanna Veerman	29 January 2002 (age 24)
Tisha Volleman	26 October 1999 (age 27)
Lieke Wevers	17 September 1991 (age 35)
Sanne Wevers	17 September 1991 (age 35)

== Team competition results ==
=== Olympic Games ===
Year	Position	Squad
1928	Gold medal	Estella Agsteribbe, Jacomina van den Berg, Alida van den Bos, Petronella Burgerhof, Elka de Levie, Helena Nordheim, Ans Polak, Petronella van Randwijk, Hendrika van Rumt, Jud Simons, Jacoba Stelma, Anna van der Vegt
1948	5th place	Cootje van Kampen-Tonneman, Lenie Gerrietsen, Jacoba Wijnands, Annie Ros, Anna Maria van Geene, Klara Post, Truida Heil-Bonnet, Dientje Meijer-Haantjes
1952	14th place	Lenie Gerrietsen, Huiberdina Krul-van der Nolk van Gogh, Annie Ros, Tootje Selbach, Cootje van Kampen-Tonneman, Jo Cox-Ladru, Toetie Selbach, Nanny Simon
1960	14th place	Bep van Ipenburg-Drommel, Lineke Majolee, Nel Fritz, Nel Wambach, Ria Meyburg, Ria van Velsen
1972	9th place	Ans van Gerwen, Ans Dekker, Ikina Morsch, Nel van der Voort, Linda Toorop, Margo Velema
1976	11th place	Ans Smulders, Jeannette van Ravestijn, Monique Bolleboom, Joke Kos, Ans Dekker, Carla Braan
2016	7th place	Eythora Thorsdottir, Céline van Gerner, Vera van Pol, Lieke Wevers, Sanne Wevers
2020	11th place	Eythora Thorsdottir, Vera van Pol, Lieke Wevers, Sanne Wevers
2024	9th place	Sanna Veerman, Naomi Visser, Tisha Volleman, Lieke Wevers, Sanne Wevers

=== World Championships ===
Year	Position	Squad
2010	9th place	Céline van Gerner, Joy Goedkoop, Marlies Rijken, Suzanne Harmes, Sanne Wevers, Yvette Moshage
2015	8th place	Eythora Thorsdottir, Lieke Wevers, Tisha Volleman, Sanne Wevers, Mara Titarsolej, Lisa Top
2018	10th place	Kirsten Polderman, Vera van Pol, Naomi Visser, Tisha Volleman, Sanne Wevers
2019	8th place	Eythora Thorsdottir, Naomi Visser, Tisha Volleman, Lieke Wevers, Sanne Wevers
2022	9th place	Eve de Ruiter, Eythora Thorsdottir, Sanna Veerman, Naomi Visser, Tisha Volleman
2023	7th place	Eythora Thorsdottir, Vera van Pol, Sanna Veerman, Naomi Visser, Sanne Wevers
2026	11th place	Vera Ubbink, Vera van Pol, Sanna Veerman, Naomi Visser, Sanne Wevers, Floor Slooff

== Most decorated gymnasts ==
This list includes all Dutch female artistic gymnasts who have won a medal at the Olympic Games or the World Artistic Gymnastics Championships.

Rank	Gymnast	Team	AA	VT	UB	BB	FX	Olympic Total	World Total	Total
1	Sanne Wevers					2016; 2015		1	1	2
2	Estella Agsteribbe	1928						1	0	1
2	Petronella Burgerhof	1928						1	0	1
2	Elka de Levie	1928						1	0	1
2	Helena Nordheim	1928						1	0	1
2	Ans Polak	1928						1	0	1
2	Jud Simons	1928						1	0	1
2	Jacoba Stelma	1928						1	0	1
2	Jacomina van den Berg	1928						1	0	1
2	Alida van den Bos	1928						1	0	1
2	Anna van der Vegt	1928						1	0	1
2	Petronella van Randwijk	1928						1	0	1
2	Hendrika van Rumt	1928						1	0	1
14	Renske Endel				2001			0	1	1
14	Verona van de Leur						2002	0	1	1
16	Suzanne Harmes						2005	0	1	1

== See also ==
- List of Olympic female artistic gymnasts for Netherlands
- Netherlands men's national artistic gymnastics team
