= List of Olympic female artistic gymnasts for Netherlands =

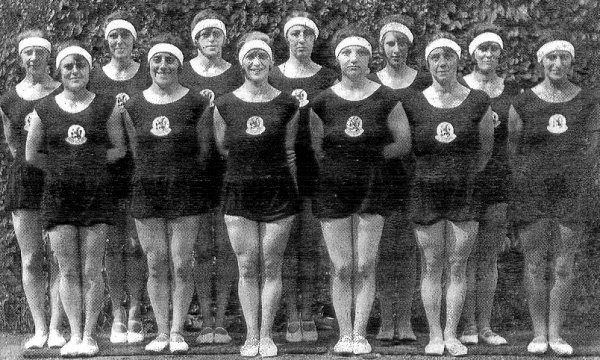
Gold medal-winning Dutch team at the 1928 Olympic Games

Gymnastics events have been staged at the Olympic Games since 1896, with women competing for the time at the 1928 Olympic Games, where the team from the Netherlands won gold.

== Gymnasts ==
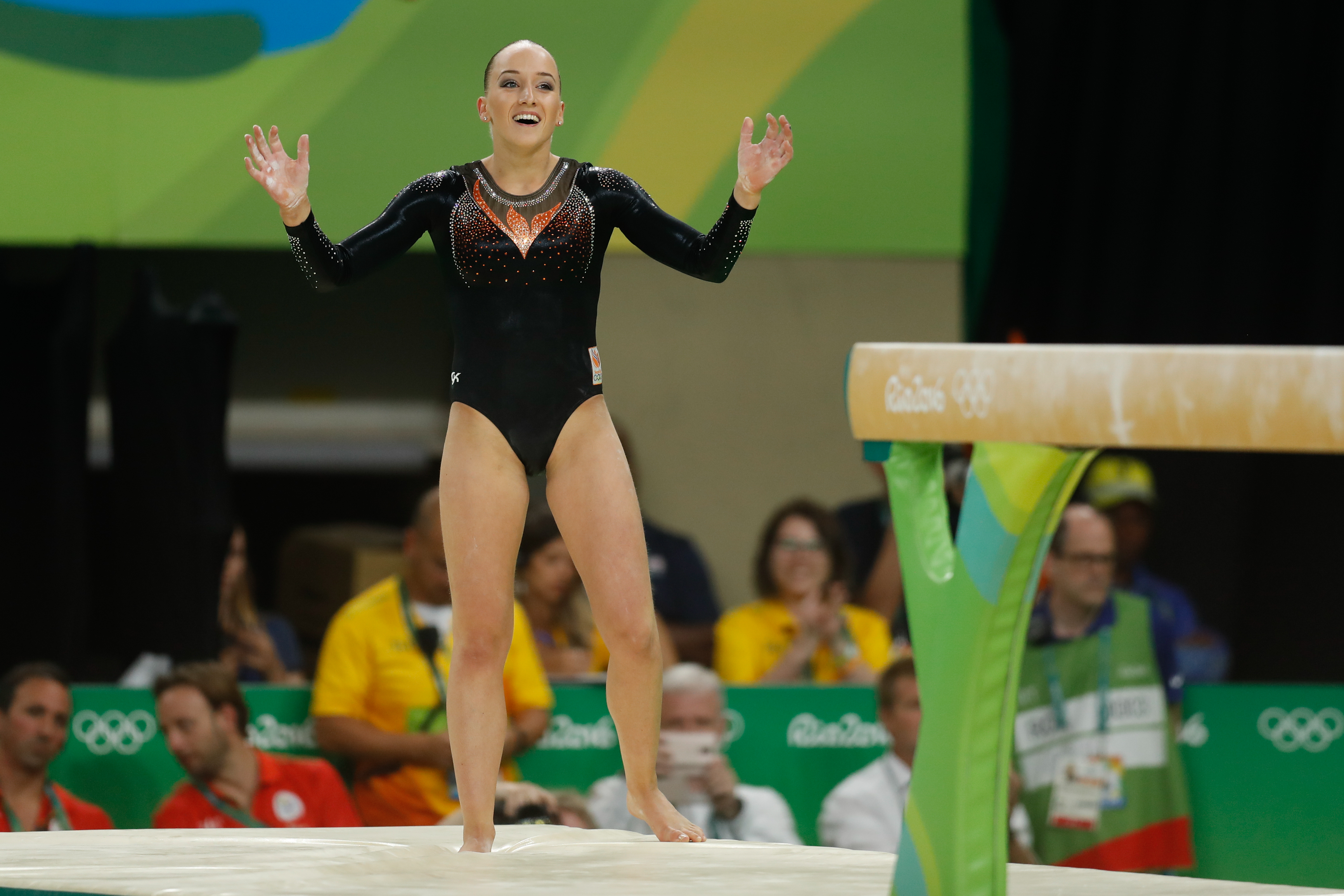
Gold medalist Sanne Wevers at the 2016 Olympic Games

Gymnast	Years
Estella Agsteribbe	1928
Elvira Becks	1992
Monique Bolleboom	1976
Carla Braan	1976
Jo Cox-Ladru	1952
Elka de Levie	1928
Ans Dekker	1972, 1976
Nel Fritz	1960
Lenie Gerrietsen	1948, 1952
Suzanne Harmes	2004, 2008
Truida Heil-Bonnet	1948
Joke Kos	1976
Huiberdina Krul	1952
Lineke Majolee	1960
Dientje Meijer-Haantjes	1948
Ria Meyburg	1960
Ikina Morsch	1972
Lea Nordheim	1928
Ans Polak	1928
Klara Post	1948
Annie Ros	1948, 1952
Tootje Selbach	1952
Toetie Selbach	1952
Nanny Simon	1952
Jacoba Stelma	1928
Eythora Thorsdottir	2016, 2020
Linda Toorop	1972
Jacomina van den Berg	1928
Alida van den Bos	1928
Anna van der Vegt	1928
Nel van der Voort	1928
Anna Maria van Geene	1948
Céline van Gerner	2012, 2016
Ans van Gerwen	1972, 1976
Bep van Ipenburg-Drommel	1960
Cootje van Kampen-Tonneman	1948, 1952
Laura van Leeuwen	2004
Vera van Pol	2016, 2020
Petronella van Randwijk	1928
Jeannette van Ravenstijn	1976
Hendrika van Rumt	1928
Sanna Veerman	2024
Ria van Velsen	1960
Margo Velema	1972
Naomi Visser	2024
Tisha Volleman	2024
Nel Wambach	1960
Lieke Wevers	2016, 2020, 2024
Sanne Wevers	2016, 2020, 2024
Jacoba Wijnands	1948

== Medalists ==
Medal	Name	Year	Event
Gold	Agsteribbe, van den Berg, van den Bos, Burgerhof, de Levie, Nordheim, Polak, van Randwijk, van Rumt, Simons, Stelma, van der Vegt	(Netherlands) 1928 Amsterdam	Women's team
Gold	Sanne Wevers	(Brazil) 2016 Rio de Janeiro	Women's balance beam

== See also ==
- Netherlands women's national gymnastics team
