= List of Olympic female artistic gymnasts for Italy =

Gymnastics events have been staged at the Olympic Games since 1896. Italian female gymnasts have competed in every Summer Olympics since 1928, except for 1932, 1964, and 1980. In total, 80 female gymnasts have represented Italy.

Italian women have won two team medals at the Olympics – the 1928 team silver and the 2024 team silver. Vanessa Ferrari earned Italy's first individual medal, a silver on the floor exercise, at the 2020 Olympic Games. At the 2024 Olympic Games, Alice D'Amato became the first Italian female artistic gymnast to win an Olympic gold medal, securing the gold on the balance beam.

Monica Bergamelli, Vanessa Ferrari, and Miranda Cicognani are the only Italian female gymnasts who have competed in at least three Olympics, with Ferrari having competed in four.

== Gymnasts ==
=== Summer Olympics ===
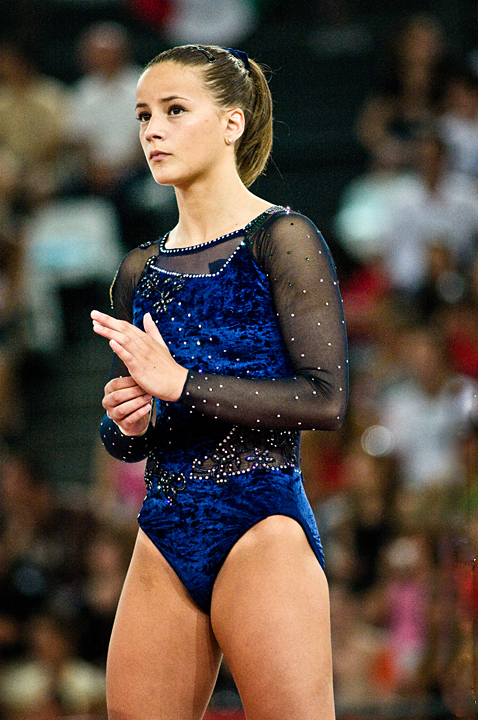
Francesca Benolli

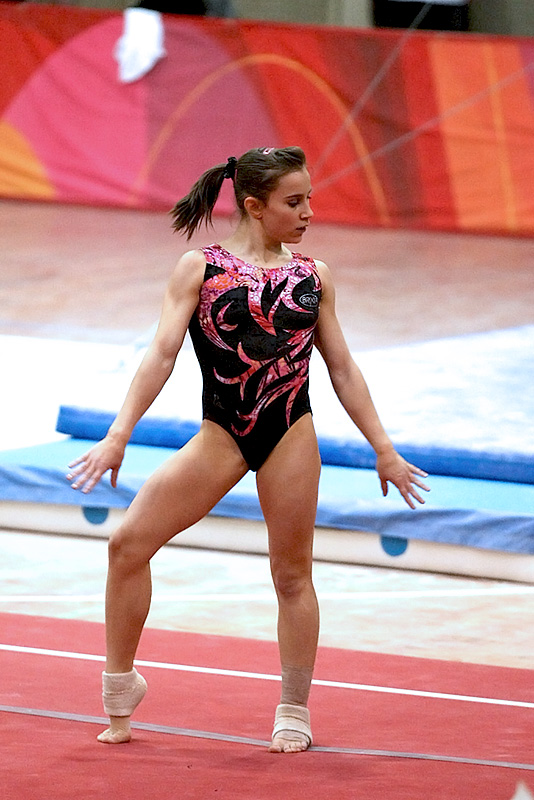
Erika Fasana

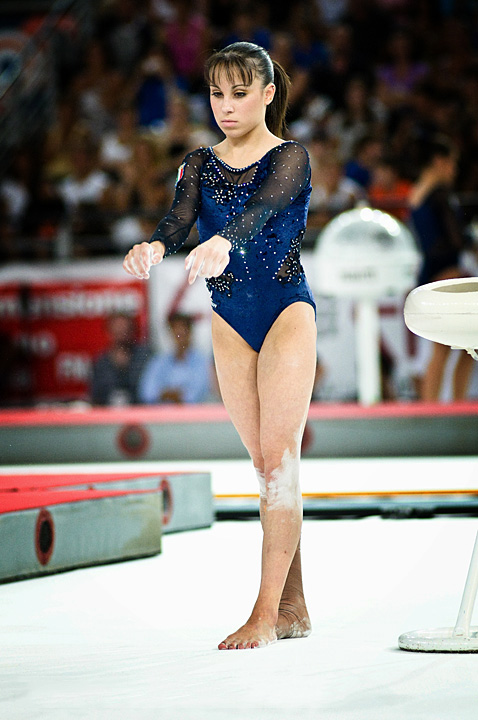
Vanessa Ferrari

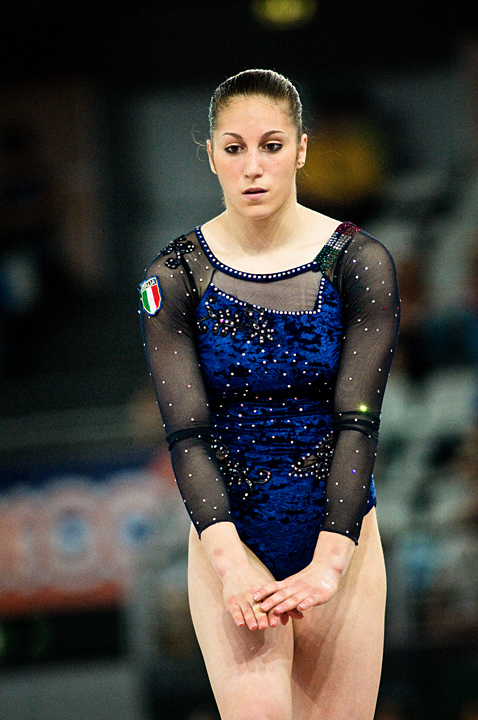
Carlotta Giovannini

Gymnast	Years	Ref.
Angela Alberti	1972	
Angela Andreoli	2024	
Francesca Benolli	2008	
Monica Bergamelli	2000, 2004, 2008	
Adriana Biagiotti	1968	
Renata Bianchi	1948, 1952	
Laura Bortolaso	1984	
Grazia Bozzo	1952	
Martina Bremini	2000	
Stefania Bucci	1976	
Elisa Calsi	1956	
Giorgia Campana	2012	
Alice Capitani	2000	
Irene Castelli	2000	
Miranda Cicognani	1952, 1956, 1960	
Rosella Cicognani	1956, 1960	
Maria Cocuzza	1988	
Francesca Costa	1960	
Adriana Crisci	2000	
Alice D'Amato	2020, 2024	
Asia D'Amato	2020	
Cinzia Delisi	1972	
Elisabetta Durelli	1952	
Manila Esposito	2024	
Erika Fasana	2012, 2016	
Carlotta Ferlito	2012, 2016	
Vanessa Ferrari	2008, 2012, 2016, 2020	
Patrizia Fratini	1976	
Maria Teresa Gargano	2004	
Carlotta Giovannini	2008	
Elisa Iorio	2024	
Elena Lagorara	1956, 1960	
Luciana Lagorara	1956	
Patrizia Luconi	1988	
Daniela Maccelli	1968	
Licia Macchini	1948, 1952	
Federica Macrì	2008	
Martina Maggio	2020	
Maria Grazia Mancuso	1972	
Gabriella Marchi	1972	
Elisa Meneghini	2016	
Francesca Morotti	1996	
Lia Parolari	2008	
Rita Peri	1972, 1976	
Lidia Pitteri	1952	
Gabriella Pozzuolo	1968	
Elisabetta Preziosa	2012	
Luciana Reali	1952, 1956	
Martina Rizzelli	2016	
Giordana Rocchi	1996	
Donatella Sacchi	1976	
Gabriella Santarelli	1960	
Liliana Scaricabarozzi	1952	
Veronica Servente	1992	
Wanda Soprani	1960	
Valentina Spongia	1976	
Monica Stefani	1972	
Laura Trefiletti	2000	
Giorgia Villa	2024	
Giulia Volpi	1988, 1992	
Carla Wieser	1976	

=== Youth Olympic Games ===
Gymnast	Years	Ref.
Carlotta Ferlito	2010	
Iosra Abdelaziz	2014	
Giorgia Villa	2018	
Dalila D'Aniello	2026	
Sofia Frenna	2026	
Clarissa Rinaldi	2026	

== Medalists ==
Medal	Name	Year	Event
Silver	Ambrosetti, Gianoni, Giavotti, Giorgi, Malabarba, Marangoni, Perversi, Pizzavini, Tanzini, Tronconi, Vercesi, Vittadini	(Netherlands) 1928 Amsterdam	Women's team
Silver	Vanessa Ferrari	(Japan) 2020 Tokyo	Women's floor exercise
Silver	Andreoli, D'Amato, Esposito, Iorio, Villa	(France) 2024 Paris	Women's team
Gold	Alice D'Amato	(France) 2024 Paris	Women's balance beam
Bronze	Manila Esposito	(France) 2024 Paris	Women's balance beam
