= Gerrit Kleerekoper =

Dutch gymnast (1897–1943)

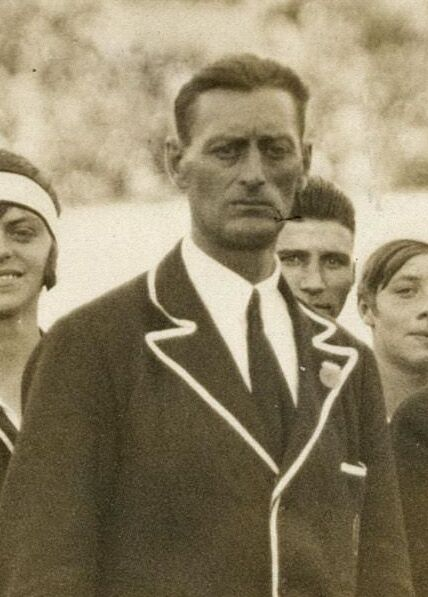
- Gerrit Kleerekoper in 1928
- Born: 15 February 1897; Amsterdam, Netherlands
- Died: 2 July 1943 (aged 46); Sobibor, German-occupied Poland
- Cause of death: Execution by poisonous gas
- Occupation: Diamond Cutter
- Known for: Gymnastics Olympic Coach
- Spouse: Kaatje: murdered – 2 July 1943 at Sobibor extermination camp
- Children: Elisabeth: murdered – 2 July 1943 at Sobibor extermination camp Leendert: c. 31 July 1944 at Auschwitz

Gerrit Kleerekoper (15 February 1897 – 2 July 1943) was a Jewish-Dutch gymnastics coach. He was married with two children and worked as a diamond cutter.

He led the Dutch women gymnastics team to win the gold medal at the 1928 Olympic Games in Amsterdam, the Netherlands. Kleerekoper's team scored 316.75 points, defeating Italy and the United Kingdom. In 1997, along with the team, he was inducted into the International Jewish Sports Hall of Fame.

Many years later Alida van den Bos, one of the gold-winning gymnasts, told in an interview how important Kleerekoper's contribution was:

"The training for the Olympics always took place at indoor gymnasiums even though the Olympics that year took place at an outdoor stadium. A few months prior to the Olympics, Kleerekoper made us only practice outdoors because he said that you never know how the weather will be the day of the Olympics and that we must be prepared for hot weather or any weather. The practice outside was very good, because we noticed that you have a lot more energy outdoors than needed."

The members of his Olympic gold-winning team were: Alida van den Bos, Estella Agsteribbe, Jacomina van den Berg, Petronella Burgerhof, Elka de Levie, Helena Nordheim, Ans Polak, Petronella van Randwijk, Hendrika van Rumt, Jud Simons, Jacoba Stelma and Anna van der Vegt.

Five members of the gold-winning team were Jewish and in 1943 were murdered at Sobibor and Auschwitz by the Nazis during Operation Reinhard.

On 2 July 1943 Gerrit Kleerekoper, along with his wife Kaatje and their fourteen-year-old daughter Elisabeth, were murdered by the Nazis at the Sobibór extermination camp in German-occupied Poland. Their twenty-one-year-old son Leendert was murdered in Auschwitz in July 1944 by exhaustion.

== See also ==
- Gerrit Kleerekoper and his family in Digital Monument to the Jewish Community in the Netherlands.
- Commemoration of Gerrit Kleerekoper, Yad Vashem website.
