= Gymnastics at the 1928 Summer Olympics =

Coordinates: 52.3434°N 4.8542°E

Gymnastics at the Games of the IX Olympiad
- Venue: Olympic Stadium

At the 1928 Summer Olympics in Amsterdam, eight events in gymnastics were contested. For the first time at the Olympic Games, women competed in gymnastics. The rope climbing and sidehorse vault events were dropped from the program.

== Men's events ==
Games	Gold	Silver	Bronze
all-around, individual	Georges Miez; Switzerland	Hermann Hänggi; Switzerland	Leon Štukelj; Yugoslavia
all-around, team	Switzerland; Hans Grieder; August Güttinger; Hermann Hänggi; Eugen Mack; Georges Miez; Otto Pfister; Eduard Steinemann; Melchior Wezel	Czechoslovakia; Josef Effenberger; Jan Gajdoš; Jan Koutný; Emanuel Löffler; Bedřich Šupčík; Ladislav Tikal; Ladislav Vácha; Václav Veselý	Yugoslavia; Edvard Antosiewicz; Dragutin Cioti; Stane Derganc; Boris Gregorka; Anton Malej; Ivan Porenta; Josip Primožič; Leon Štukelj
horizontal bar	Georges Miez; Switzerland	Romeo Neri; Italy	Eugen Mack; Switzerland
parallel bars	Ladislav Vácha; Czechoslovakia	Josip Primožič; Yugoslavia	Hermann Hänggi; Switzerland
pommel horse	Hermann Hänggi; Switzerland	Georges Miez; Switzerland	Heikki Savolainen; Finland
rings	Leon Štukelj; Yugoslavia	Ladislav Vácha; Czechoslovakia	Emanuel Löffler; Czechoslovakia
vault	Eugen Mack; Switzerland	Emanuel Löffler; Czechoslovakia	Stane Derganc; Yugoslavia

== Women's events ==
Although extensive results detailing the performance of the men gymnasts, both teams and individuals, were published in the Official Olympic Report for these 1928 Summer Olympic Games, only the team results (both combined and with respect to exercise) were published for the women, providing no information whatsoever about the capacities of the various individual women who competed here.

Event	Gold	Silver	Bronze
all-around, team	Netherlands; Estella Agsteribbe; Jacomina van den Berg; Alida van den Bos; Petronella Burgerhof; Elka de Levie; Helena Nordheim; Ans Polak; Petronella van Randwijk; Hendrika van Rumt; Jud Simons; Jacoba Stelma; Anna van der Vegt	Italy; Bianca Ambrosetti; Lavinia Gianoni; Luigina Giavotti; Virginia Giorgi; Germana Malabarba; Carla Marangoni; Luigina Perversi; Diana Pissavini; Luisa Tanzini; Carolina Tronconi; Ines Vercesi; Rita Vittadini	Great Britain; Annie Broadbent; Lucy Desmond; Margaret Hartley; Amy Jagger; Isobel Judd; Jessie Kite; Marjorie Moreman; Edith Pickles; Ethel Seymour; Ada Smith; Hilda Smith; Doris Woods

== Participating nations ==
- Czechoslovakia (8)
- Finland (8)
- France (20)
- Great Britain (20)
- Hungary (20)
- Italy (20)
- Luxembourg (8)
- Netherlands (20)
- Switzerland (8)
- United States (8)
- Yugoslavia (8)

== Medal table ==
Rank	Nation	Gold	Silver	Bronze	Total
1	Switzerland	5	2	2	9
2	Czechoslovakia	1	3	1	5
3	Yugoslavia	1	1	3	5
4	Netherlands	1	0	0	1
5	Italy	0	2	0	2
6	Finland	0	0	1	1
6	Great Britain	0	0	1	1
Totals (7 entries)		8	8	8	24

== Sources ==
- "Olympic Medal Winners". International Olympic Committee.
