= Hennyei =

Hennyei is a surname. Notable people with the surname include:

- Aranka Hennyei (1900–1987), Hungarian gymnast
- Imre Hennyei (1913–1989), Hungarian épée fencer
- Irén Hennyei, Hungarian gymnast, participant in the 1928 Summer Olympics
