= Szeiler =

Szeiler is a surname. Notable people with the surname include:

- Aranka Szeiler (1909–1982), Hungarian gymnast
- Josef Szeiler, Austrian theatre director
