= Valéria Frantz-Herpich =

Hungarian gymnast

Personal information
- Nationality: Hungarian
- Born: 11 September 1900; Pula, Austria-Hungary
- Died: 15 October 1981 (aged 81)

Sport
- Sport: Gymnastics

Valéria Frantz-Herpich (11 September 1900 – 15 October 1981) was a Hungarian gymnast. She competed in the women's artistic team all-around event at the 1928 Summer Olympics.
