= Georgette Meulebroeck =

French gymnast

Personal information
- Nationality: French

Sport
- Sport: Gymnastics

Georgette Meulebroeck was a French gymnast. She competed in the women's artistic team all-around event at the 1928 Summer Olympics.
