= Valentine Héméryck =

French gymnast (1910–1969)

Personal information
- Full name: Valentine Marthe Héméryck
- Nationality: French
- Born: 18 September 1910; Deûlémont, France
- Died: 6 February 1969 (aged 58); Tourcoing, France

Sport
- Sport: Gymnastics

Valentine Héméryck (18 September 1910 – 6 February 1969) was a French gymnast. She competed in the women's artistic team all-around event at the 1928 Summer Olympics.
