= Geneviève Vankiersbilck =

French gymnast

Personal information
- Nationality: French
- Born: 12 March 1904
- Died: 29 November 1990 (aged 86)

Sport
- Sport: Gymnastics

Geneviève Vankiersbilck (12 March 1904 – 29 November 1990) was a French gymnast. She competed in the women's artistic team all-around event at the 1928 Summer Olympics.
