= Jeanne Vanoverloop =

French gymnast 1913–1931

Personal information
- Nationality: French
- Born: 23 February 1913; Roubaix, France
- Died: 11 October 1931 (aged 18); Paris, France

Sport
- Sport: Gymnastics

Jeanne Vanoverloop (23 February 1913 – 11 October 1931) was a French gymnast. She competed in the women's artistic team all-around event at the 1928 Summer Olympics.
