= Antonie Straeteman =

French gymnast

Personal information
- Nationality: French
- Born: 17 July 1907; Roubaix, France
- Died: 31 January 1998 (aged 90); Tourcoing, France

Sport
- Sport: Gymnastics

Antonie Eugenie Yvonne Straeteman (17 July 1907 – 31 January 1998) was a French gymnast. She competed in the women's artistic team all-around event at the 1928 Summer Olympics.
