= Irén Rudas =

Hungarian gymnast

Personal information
- Nationality: Hungarian

Sport
- Sport: Gymnastics

Irén Rudas was a Hungarian gymnast. She competed in the women's artistic team all-around event at the 1928 Summer Olympics.
