= Mária Hámos =

Hungarian gymnast

Personal information
- Nationality: Hungarian
- Born: 5 January 1911
- Died: United States

Sport
- Sport: Gymnastics

Mária Hámos (born 5 January 1911, date of death unknown) was a Hungarian gymnast. She competed in the women's artistic team all-around event at the 1928 Summer Olympics.
