= Paulette Houtéer =

French gymnast (1912–2001)

Paule Houtéer
Personal information
- Full name: Paule Henriette Houtéer
- Nationality: French
- Born: 4 October 1912; Croix, France
- Died: 17 February 2001 (aged 88); Lille, France

Sport
- Sport: Gymnastics

Paule Houtéer (4 October 1912 – 17 February 2001) was a French gymnast. She competed in the women's artistic team all-around event at the 1928 Summer Olympics.
