= Margit Pályi =

Hungarian gymnast

Personal information
- Nationality: Hungarian
- Born: 21 October 1908; Budapest, Austria-Hungary
- Died: 15 April 1996 (aged 87)

Sport
- Sport: Gymnastics

Margit Pályi (21 October 1908 – 15 April 1996) was a Hungarian gymnast. She competed in the women's artistic team all-around event at the 1928 Summer Olympics.
