= Margit Kövessi =

Hungarian gymnast (1907–1992)

Personal information
- Full name: Margit Mária Ilona Kövessi
- Nationality: Hungarian
- Born: 1 September 1907; Selmecbánya, Austria-Hungary
- Died: 30 August 1992 (aged 84); Budapest, Hungary

Sport
- Sport: Gymnastics

Margit Kövessi (1 September 1907 – 30 August 1992) was a Hungarian gymnast. She competed in the women's artistic team all-around event at the 1928 Summer Olympics.
