= Aranka Hennyei =

Hungarian gymnast

Personal information
- Nationality: Hungarian
- Born: 15 July 1900
- Died: 1987 (aged 86–87)

Sport
- Sport: Gymnastics

Aranka Hennyei (15 July 1900 – 1987) was a Hungarian gymnast. She competed in the women's artistic team all-around event at the 1928 Summer Olympics.
