= Hermann Hänggi =

Swiss gymnast (1894–1978)

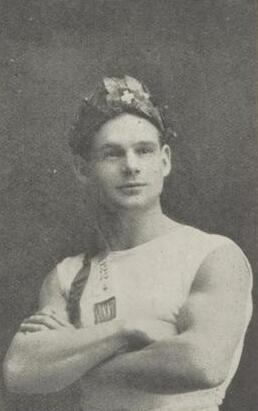

Personal information
- Born: 15 October 1894 Mümliswil-Ramiswil, Switzerland
- Died: 21 November 1978 (aged 84) Burgdorf, Switzerland

Gymnastics career
- Discipline: Men's artistic gymnastics
- Country represented: Switzerland
Medal record
Men's Gymnastics
Representing Switzerland
Gold medal – first place	1928 Amsterdam	Team
Gold medal – first place	1928 Amsterdam	Pommeled Horse
Silver medal – second place	1928 Amsterdam	All-around
Bronze medal – third place	1928 Amsterdam	Parallel Bars
World Championships
Gold medal – first place	1931 Paris	Vault
Gold medal – first place	1934 Budapest	Team

Hermann Hänggi (15 October 1894 – 21 November 1978) was a Swiss gymnast and Olympic Champion. He competed at the 1928 Summer Olympics, where he won two gold medals, one silver and one bronze medal. Additionally, he competed at the 1931 World Artistic Gymnastics Championships where he won an individual gold medal on the vault apparatus.
