= Aranka Szeiler =

Hungarian gymnast

Personal information
- Nationality: Hungarian
- Born: 5 May 1909; Budapest, Austria-Hungary
- Died: 31 January 1982 (aged 72); Budapest, Hungary

Sport
- Sport: Gymnastics

Aranka Szeiler (5 May 1909 – 31 January 1982) was a Hungarian gymnast. She competed in the women's artistic team all-around event at the 1928 Summer Olympics.
