= Huiberdina Krul =

Dutch artistic gymnast (1922–1994)

Dini Krul
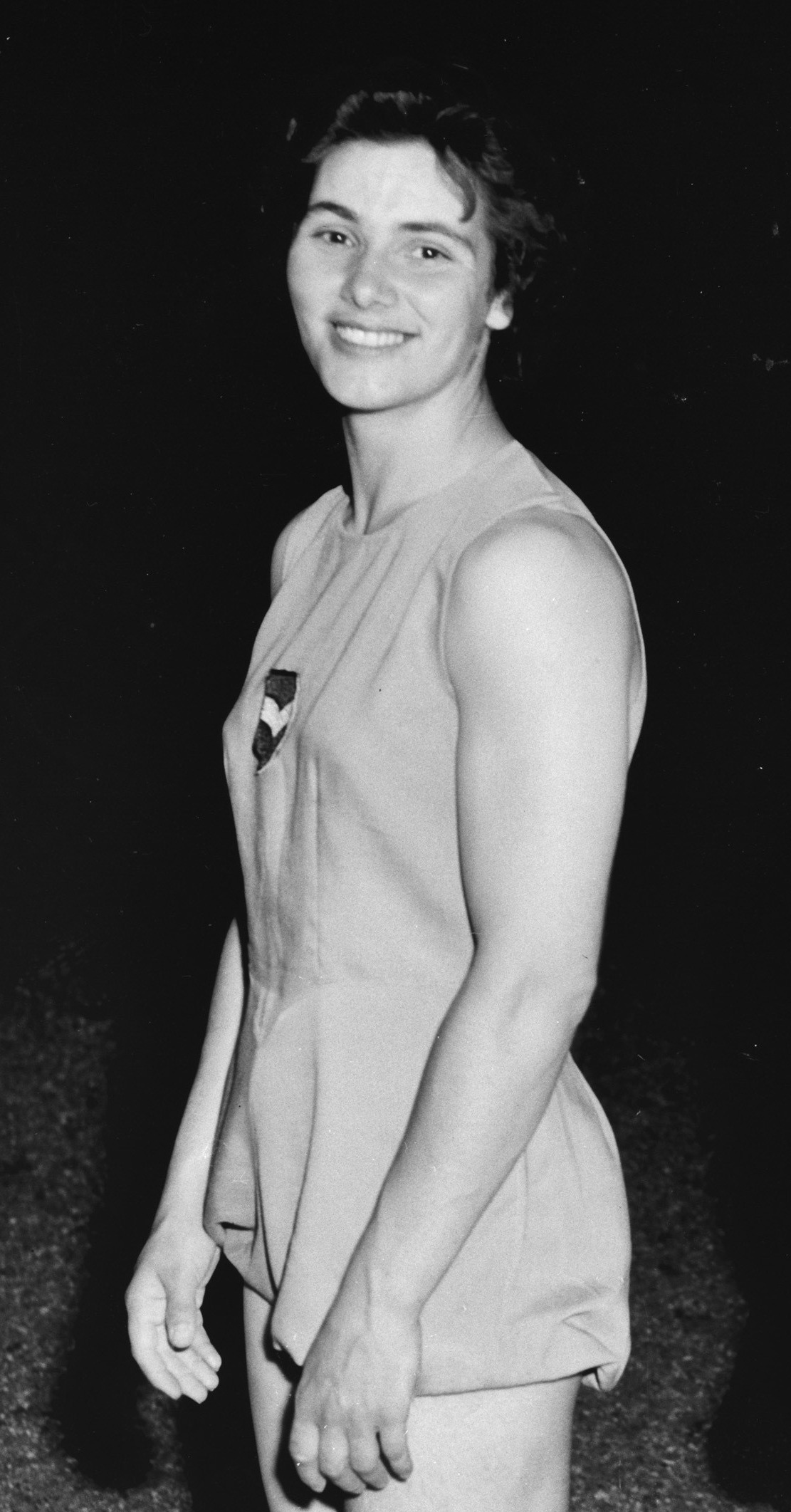
- Huiberdina Krul in 1952

Personal information
- Born: 22 May 1922 The Hague, the Netherlands
- Died: 5 December 1994 (aged 72) The Hague, the Netherlands

Sport
- Sport: Artistic gymnastics

Huiberdina Krul-van der Nolk van Gogh (22 May 1922 – 5 December 1994) was a Dutch gymnast. She competed at the 1952 Summer Olympics in all artistic gymnastics events and finished in 6th place in the team portable apparatus and in 14th place in team all-round.
