= Annie Ros =

Dutch gymnast

Personal information
- Nationality: Dutch
- Born: 5 March 1926; Utrecht, Netherlands
- Died: 14 June 2013 (aged 87)

Sport
- Sport: Gymnastics

Annie Ros (5 March 1926 – 14 June 2013) was a Dutch gymnast. She competed at the 1948 Summer Olympics and the 1952 Summer Olympics.
