= Jo Cox-Ladru =

Dutch gymnast (born 1923)

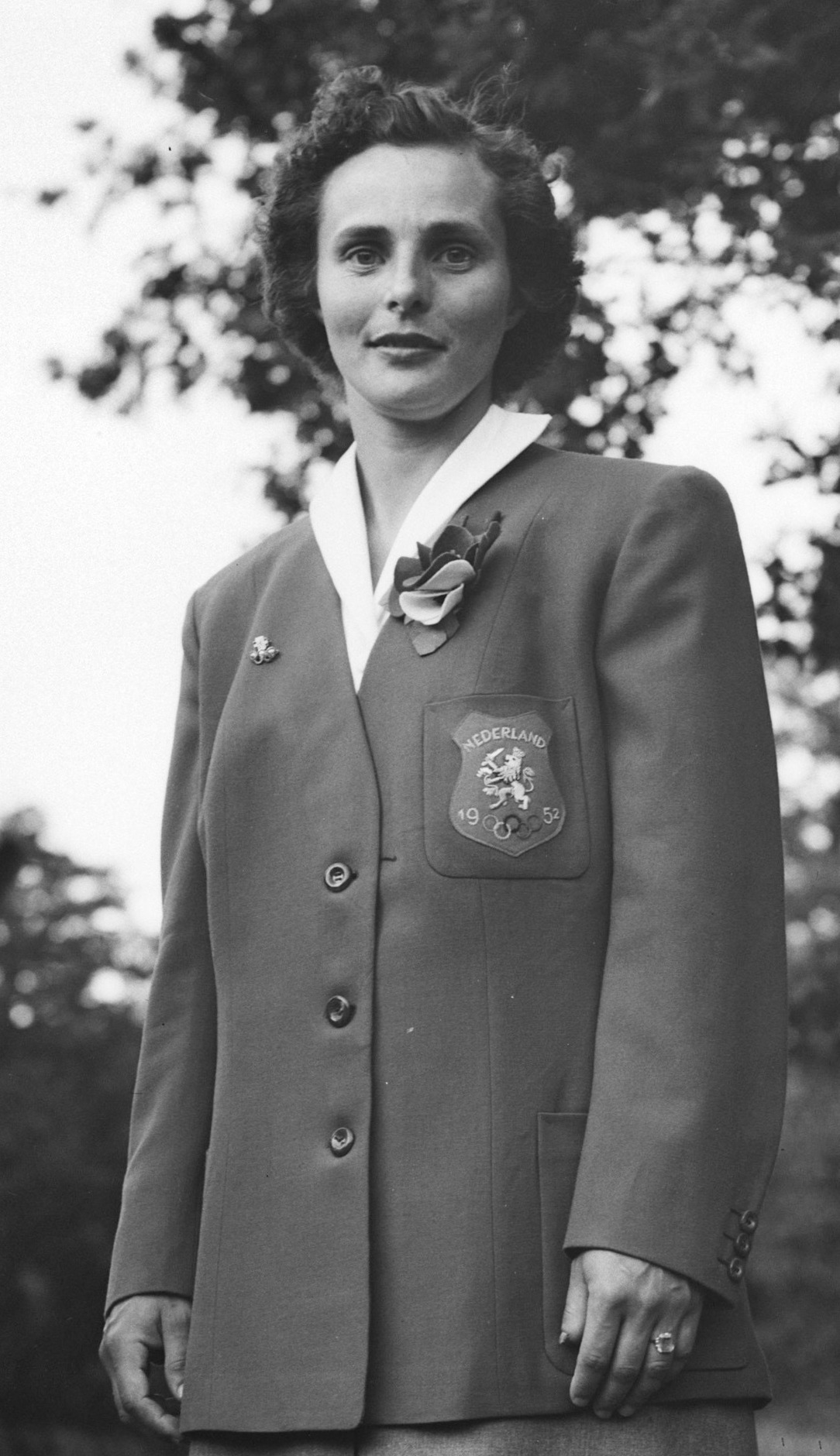
- Jo Cox-Ladru in 1952

Personal information
- Born: 8 March 1923 Amsterdam, Netherlands
- Died: 13 November 2014 (aged 91) Zaanstad, Netherlands

Sport
- Sport: Artistic gymnastics
- Club: Hercules, Amsterdam

Johanna Cox-Ladru (8 March 1923 – 13 November 2014) was a Dutch gymnast. She competed at the 1952 Olympics in all artistic gymnastics events with the best result of 6th place in the team portable apparatus. Cox-Ladru is deceased.
