= Ans Dekker =

Dutch artistic gymnast

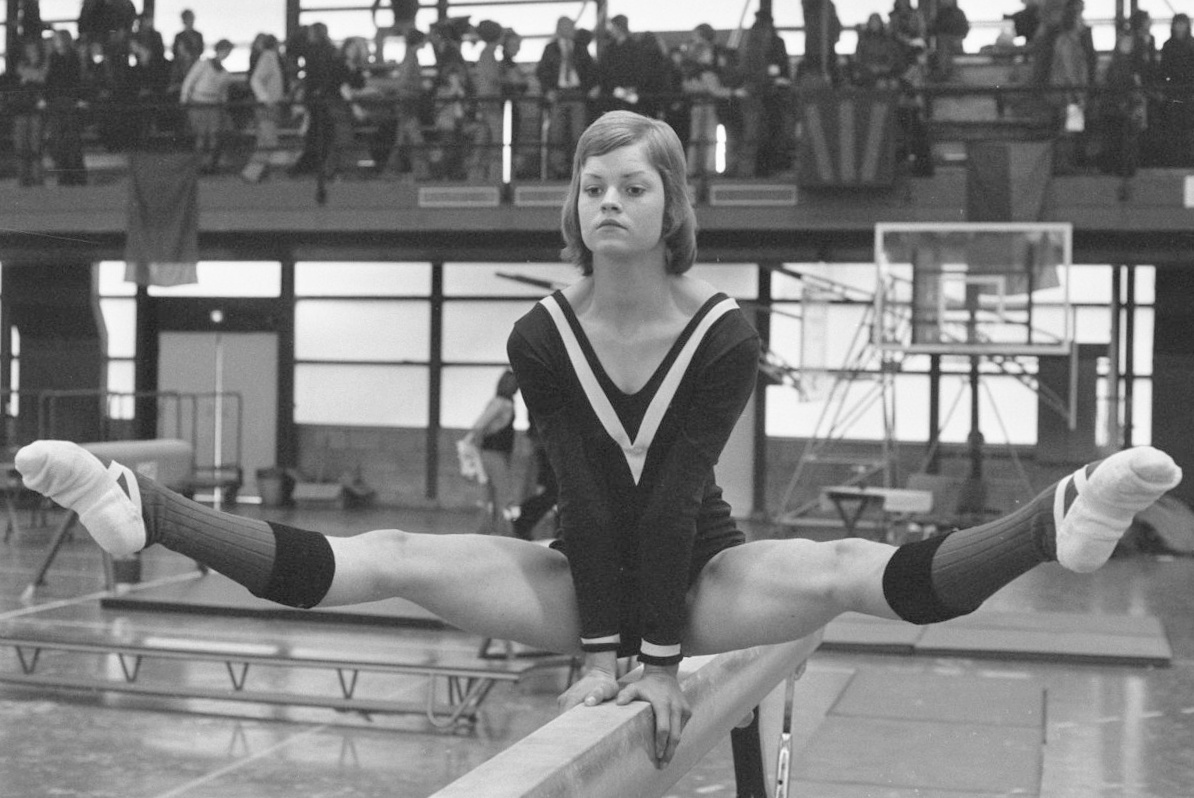
- Ans Dekker in 1974

Personal information
- Born: 3 January 1955 (age 71) Beverwijk, Netherlands
- Height: 1.67 m (5 ft 6 in)
- Weight: 54 kg (119 lb)

Sport
- Sport: Artistic gymnastics
- Club: Klimop, Heiloo

Anna Maria "Ans" Dekker (born 1 March 1955) is a former artistic gymnast from the Netherlands who competed at the 1972 and 1976 Summer Olympics in all artistic gymnastics events. Her best achievement was 9th place in the team all-around in 1972.

She is wife of Sjaak Pieters, aunt of Amy Pieters and sister-in-law of Peter Pieters, all of whom are Olympic cyclists.
