= Cootje van Kampen-Tonneman =

Dutch gymnast

Personal information
- Nationality: Dutch
- Born: 15 September 1921; Hoorn, Netherlands
- Died: 11 June 2001 (aged 79); The Hague, Netherlands

Sport
- Sport: Gymnastics

Jacoba Adriana van Kampen-Tonneman (15 September 1921 – 11 June 2001) was a Dutch gymnast. She competed at the 1948 Summer Olympics and the 1952 Summer Olympics.
