= Elka de Levie =

Dutch gymnast (1905–1979)

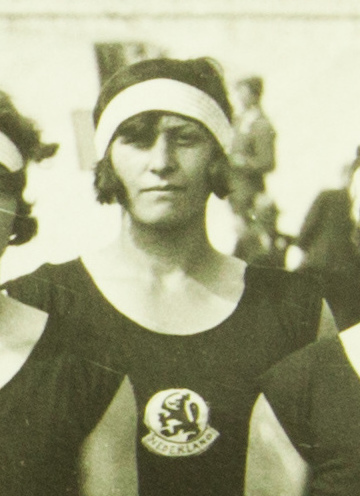
- Elka de Levi in 1928

Medal record

Women's gymnastics

Representing the Netherlands

Summer Olympics
Gold medal – first place	1928 Amsterdam	Team

Elka de Levie (21 November 1905 – 29 December 1979) was an Amsterdam-born Dutch gymnast who won the gold medal as member of the Dutch gymnastics team at the 1928 Summer Olympics in Amsterdam. She was the only Jewish team member to survive the Holocaust; her teammates Anna Dresden-Polak, Jud Simons and Helena Nordheim and coach Gerrit Kleerekoper were murdered in Sobibor, while Estella Agsteribbe was murdered in Auschwitz. The entire team was elected to the International Jewish Sports Hall of Fame in 1997.

On 31 October 1929 she married Andries Abraham Boas, with whom she had two daughters, but the couple were divorced on 20 April 1943. She and both her daughters survived the Second World War by going into hiding. Elka de Levie died in anonymity in Amsterdam on 29 December 1979.

== See also ==
- List of select Jewish gymnasts
