= Jessie Kite =

British gymnast (1892–1958)

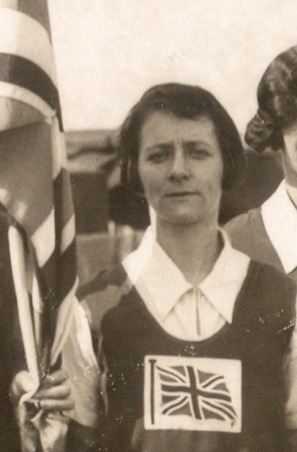
- Jessie Kite in 1928

Personal information
- Born: 17 May 1892 Hackney, London, England
- Died: 1 May 1958 (aged 65) Chichester, England

Gymnastics career
Medal record
Olympic Games
Women's gymnastics
Bronze medal – third place	1928 Amsterdam	Women's team

Jessie Kite (17 May 1892 – 1 May 1958) was a British gymnast. She won a bronze medal in the women's team event at the 1928 Summer Olympics.
