= Carla Marangoni =

Italian gymnast (1915–2018)

Personal information
- Born: Carla Marangoni; 13 November 1915 Pavia, Kingdom of Italy
- Died: 18 January 2018 (aged 102) Pavia, Italy
Medal record
Women's gymnastics
Representing Italy
Olympic Games
Silver medal – second place	1928 Amsterdam	Team

Carla Marangoni, (13 November 1915 – 18 January 2018) was an Italian gymnast who competed in the 1928 Summer Olympics. She was born in Pavia as Carla, but she is usually (mistakenly) mentioned in the official statistics as Clara. In 1928, she won the silver medal as member of the Italian gymnastics team and was therefore among the first Italian women to win an Olympic medal. She was also the last surviving athlete from the 1928 Summer Games. Marangoni died on 18 January 2018 at the age of 102 years. She was the 6th and last youngest medalist from the Olympic Games (12 years and 270 days) until the silver medal in skateboarding from the Brazilian Rayssa Leal in 2021 (13 years and 203 days).

== See also ==
- List of centenarians (sportspeople)
