= Edith Pickles =

British gymnast (1904–1984)

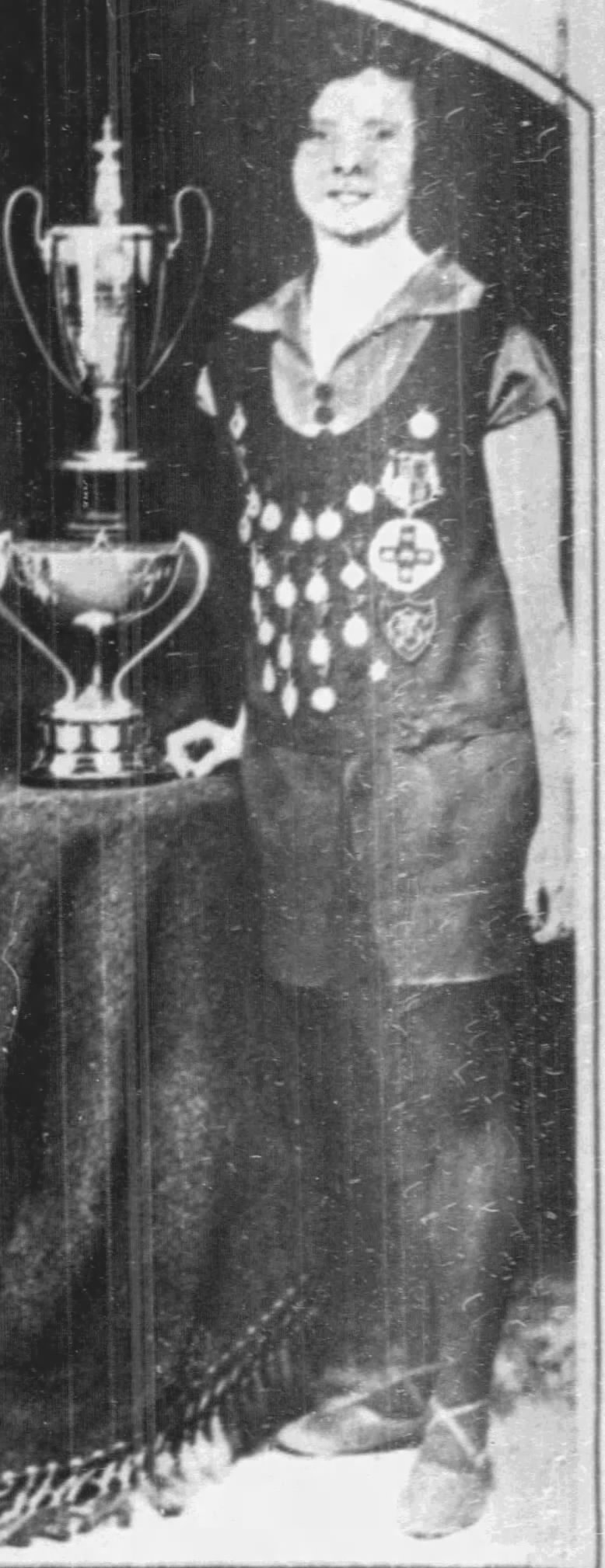

Personal information
- Full name: Edith Carrie Pickles
- Born: 10 May 1904 Wilsden, England
- Died: 18 March 1984 (aged 79) Glasgow, Scotland

Gymnastics career
Medal record
Olympic Games
Women's gymnastics
Bronze medal – third place	1928 Amsterdam	Women's team

Edith Pickles (10 May 1904 – 18 March 1984) was a British gymnast. She won a bronze medal in the women's team event at the 1928 Summer Olympics.

Pickles was the mother of Jill Pollard.
