= Ines Vercesi =

Italian gymnast

Personal information
- Full name: Iones Vercesi
- Born: 5 January 1916 Pavia, Italy
- Died: 24 April 1997 (aged 81) Sestri Levante, Italy
Medal record
Women's gymnastics
Representing Italy
Olympic Games
Silver medal – second place	1928 Amsterdam	Team

Iones "Ines" Vercesi (5 January 1916 – 24 April 1997) was an Italian gymnast who competed in the 1928 Summer Olympics. In 1928, she won the silver medal as member of the Italian gymnastics team. She was the 4th youngest medalist at the Olympic Games (12 years and 217 days).
