= Margaret Hartley =

British artistic gymnast (1906–1964)

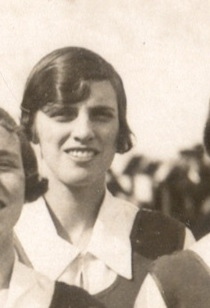
- Margaret Hartley in 1928

Personal information
- Born: 25 February 1906 Burnley, England
- Died: 15 November 1964 (aged 58) Wirral, England

Gymnastics career
Medal record
Olympic Games
Women's gymnastics
| Bronze medal – third place | 1928 Amsterdam | Women's team |

Margaret Hartley (25 February 1906 – 15 November 1964) was a British gymnast. She won a bronze medal in the women's team event at the 1928 Summer Olympics.
