= Doris Woods =

British artistic gymnast (1902–1956)

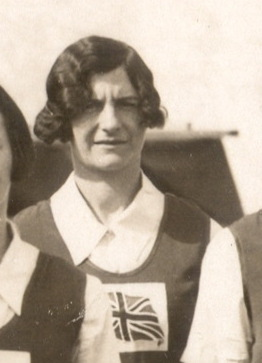
- Doris Woods in 1928

Personal information
- Full name: Doris Woods
- Born: 1 August 1902 Plaistow, London, England
- Died: 13 September 1956 (aged 54) Caterham, England

Gymnastics career
Medal record
Olympic Games
Women's gymnastics
Bronze medal – third place	1928 Amsterdam	Women's team

Doris Woods (1 August 1902 – 13 September 1956) was a British gymnast. She won a bronze medal in the women's team event at the 1928 Summer Olympics.
