= Hilda Smith (gymnast) =

British gymnast (1909–1995)

- Born: 30 September 1909 Leigh, England
- Died: 22 January 1995 (aged 85) Leigh, England

Gymnastics career
Medal record
Olympic Games
Women's gymnastics
Bronze medal – third place	1928 Amsterdam	Women's team

Hilda Smith (30 September 1909 – 22 January 1995) was a British gymnast. She won a bronze medal in the women's team event at the 1928 Summer Olympics.
