= Amy Jagger =

British artistic gymnast (1908–1993)

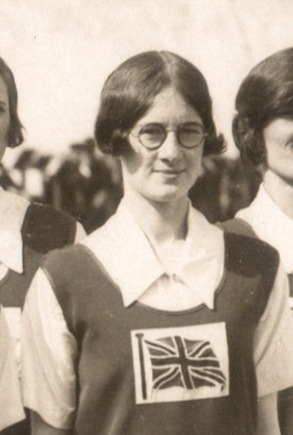
- Amy Jagger in 1928

Personal information
- Full name: Amy Crossley Jagger
- Born: 14 May 1908 Halifax, England
- Died: 17 November 1993 (aged 85) Congleton, England

Gymnastics career
- Discipline: Women's artistic gymnastics
- Country represented: United Kingdom
Medal record
Women's artistic gymnastics
Representing Great Britain
Olympic Games
Bronze medal – third place	1928 Amsterdam	Team

Amy Crossley Jagger (later Fisher; 14 May 1908 – 17 November 1993) was a British gymnast who competed in the 1928 Summer Olympics. In 1928 she won the bronze medal as member of the British gymnastics team.
