= Lucy Desmond =

British artistic gymnast (1899–1992)

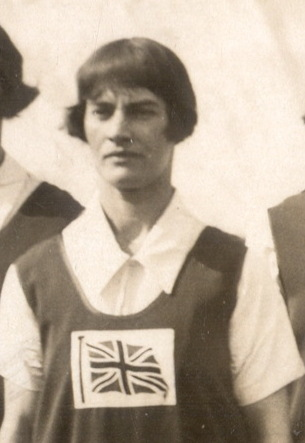
- Lucy Desmond in 1928

Personal information
- Born: April 17, 1899 Lambeth, England
- Died: August 1992 (aged 92–93) Surrey, England

Gymnastics career
Medal record
Olympic Games
Women's gymnastics
Bronze medal – third place	1928 Amsterdam	Women's team

Lucy Desmond (17 April 1899 – August 1992) was a British gymnast. She won a bronze medal in the women's team event at the 1928 Summer Olympics.
