= Marjorie Moreman =

British artistic gymnast (1902–1987)

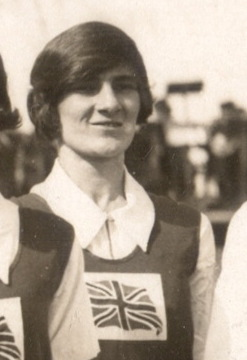
- Midge Moreman in 1928

Personal information
- Born: 17 October 1902 Mount Abu, India
- Died: September 1987 Southampton, England

Gymnastics career
Medal record
Olympic Games
Women's gymnastics
Bronze medal – third place	1928 Amsterdam	Women's team

Marjorie "Midge" Moreman (17 October 1902 – September 1987) was a British gymnast. She won a bronze medal in the women's team event at the 1928 Summer Olympics.
