= Ada Smith (gymnast) =

British artistic gymnast (1903–1994)

- Born: 24 June 1903 Leigh, England
- Died: 8 August 1994 (aged 91)

Gymnastics career
Medal record
Women's gymnastics
Representing Great Britain
Olympic Games
Bronze medal – third place	1928 Amsterdam	Women's team

Ada Smith (24 June 1903 – 8 August 1994) was a British gymnast. She won a bronze medal in the women's team event at the 1928 Summer Olympics.
