= Annie Broadbent =

British artistic gymnast (1908–1996)

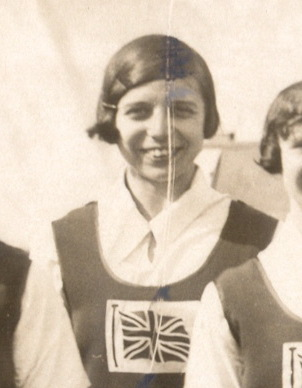
- Annie Broadbent in 1928

Personal information
- Full name: Annie Broadbent
- Born: 9 June 1908 Halifax, West Yorkshire, England
- Died: 14 January 1996 (aged 87) Halifax, West Yorkshire, England

Gymnastics career
Medal record
Women's gymnastics
Representing Great Britain
Olympic Games
Bronze medal – third place	1928 Amsterdam	Women's team

Annie Broadbent (9 June 1908 – 14 January 1996) was a British Olympic artistic gymnast.

In 1928 she won the Yorkshire Individual competition, came second in the Northern Counties Championship and won a bronze medal in the women's team event at the 1928 Summer Olympics. She won a national title in 1930.
