= Isabel Judd =

British gymnast (1886–1951)

- Full name: Isabel Mary Raven Boake
- Born: 19 October 1886 Tottenham, England
- Died: 1 June 1951 (aged 64) Mile End, England

Gymnastics career
Medal record
Olympic Games
Women's gymnastics
Bronze medal – third place	1928 Amsterdam	Women's team

Isabel Judd (18 October 1886 – 1 June 1951) was a British gymnast. She won a bronze medal in the women's team event at the 1928 Summer Olympics.

Born Isabel Boake, she married Albert Edward Judd in 1913.
