= Estella Agsteribbe =

Dutch artistic gymnast and holocaust victim (1909–1943)

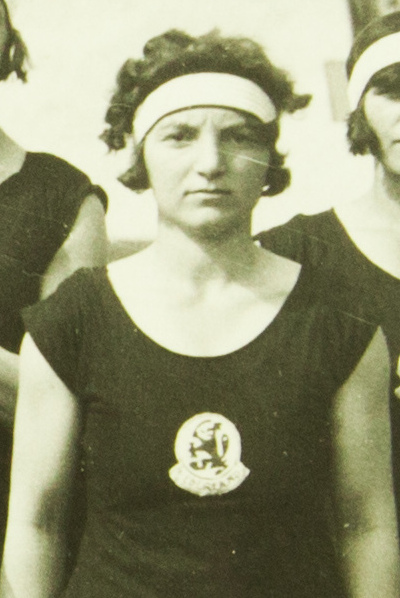
- Estella Agsteribbe in 1928

Personal information
- Alternative name: Stella Blits
- Born: 6 April 1909 Amsterdam, Netherlands
- Died: 17 September 1943 (aged 34) Auschwitz-Birkenau, German-occupied Poland

Gymnastics career
- Discipline: Women's artistic gymnastics
- Country represented: Netherlands
Medal record
Women's gymnastics
Representing the Netherlands
Olympic Games
Gold medal – first place	1928 Amsterdam	Team

Estella "Stella" Agsteribbe (6 April 1909 – 17 September 1943) was a Dutch gymnast. She won the gold medal as member of the Dutch gymnastics team at the 1928 Summer Olympics in her native Amsterdam. The team was inducted into the International Jewish Sports Hall of Fame in 1997.

Like other members of her team (Lea Nordheim, Ans Polak, Judikje Simons, Elka de Levie) and their coach Gerrit Kleerekoper, she was Jewish and deported during World War II. She was murdered together with her husband Samuel Blits, their six-year-old daughter Nanny and their two-year-old son Alfred in the Auschwitz concentration camp.

== See also ==
- List of select Jewish gymnasts
- List of victims of Nazism
- World War II casualties of Poland
