= Ethel Seymour =

British gymnast (1897–1963)

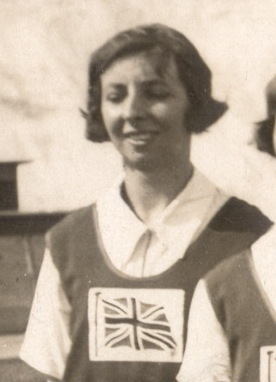
- Ethel Seymour in 1928

Personal information
- Full name: Ethel Seymour
- Born: 6 March 1897
- Died: 13 November 1963 (aged 66)

Gymnastics career
Medal record
Olympic Games
Women's gymnastics
Bronze medal – third place	1928 Amsterdam	Women's team

Ethel Seymour (6 March 1897 – 13 November 1963) was a British gymnast. She won a bronze medal in the women's team event at the 1928 Summer Olympics.
