= Anna Dresden-Polak =

Dutch gymnast (1906–1943)

Ans Polak
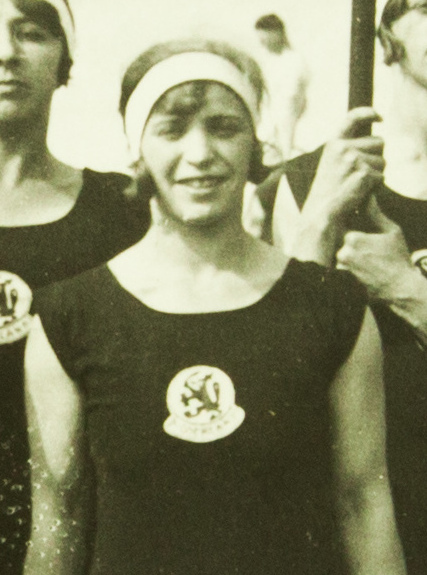
- Anna Polak in 1928

Personal information
- Born: 24 November 1906 Amsterdam
- Died: 23 July 1943 (aged 36) Sobibor extermination camp

Gymnastics career
- Discipline: Women's artistic gymnastics
- Country represented: Netherlands
Medal record
Women's gymnastics
Representing the Netherlands
Summer Olympics
Gold medal – first place	1928 Amsterdam	Team

Anna "Ans" Dresden-Polak (née Anna Polak) (24 November 1906 – 23 July 1943) was a Jewish Dutch gymnast.

She won the gold medal as a member of the Dutch gymnastics team at the 1928 Summer Olympics, in her native Amsterdam. She was one of five Jewish members of the team, which included Stella Blits-Agsteribbe (who was murdered in Auschwitz), Lea Kloot-Nordheim (who was murdered in Sobibor), and Judikje Themans-Simons (who was murdered in Sobibor). Their coach, Gerrit Kleerekoper, was murdered in Sobibor as well.

She was born in Amsterdam, and was murdered in Sobibor extermination camp. From Westerbork concentration camp, she had been deported to Sobibór, where she was murdered on 23 July 1943, together with her six-year-old daughter Eva. Her husband, Barend Dresden was murdered a few months later in 1944 in Auschwitz concentration camp.

She was inducted into the International Jewish Sports Hall of Fame in 1997.

== See also ==
- List of select Jewish gymnasts
