= Carolina Tronconi =

Italian gymnast (1913–2008)

- Full name: Carolina Tronconi
- Born: May 22, 1913 Pawia
- Died: February 11, 2008

Gymnastics career
- Country represented: Italy
Medal record
Women's gymnastics
Representing Italy
Olympic Games
Silver medal – second place	1928 Amsterdam	Team

Carolina Tronconi (22 May 1913 – 11 February 2008) was an Italian gymnast who competed in the 1928 Summer Olympics. In 1928 she won the silver medal as member of the Italian gymnastics team.
