= Diana Pizzavini =

Italian gymnast (1911–1989)

Personal information
- Born: 6 August 1911 Milan, Kingdom of Italy
- Died: 23 January 1989 (aged 77) Pavia, Italy

Sport
- Country: Italy
- Sport: Gymnastics
- Club: Società Ginnastica Pavese
Medal record
Olympic Games
Silver medal – second place	1928 Amsterdam	Team

Diana Pizzavini (also spelled Pissavini, 6 August 1911 – 23 January 1989) was an Italian gymnast who competed in the 1928 Summer Olympics. In 1928 she won the silver medal as member of the Italian gymnastics team.
