= Bianca Ambrosetti =

Italian gymnast (1914–1933)

Personal information
- Born: 1 March 1914 Pavia, Italy
- Died: 27 March 1933 (aged 19) Pavia, Italy

Sport
- Country: Italy
- Sport: Gymnastics
- Club: Società Ginnastica Pavese
Medal record
Olympic Games
| Silver medal – second place | 1928 Amsterdam | Team |

Bianca Ambrosetti (1 March 1914 – 27 March 1933) was an Italian gymnast. At the 1928 Summer Olympics, at the age of 14, she won the silver medal as member of the Italian gymnastics team. Ambrosetti was already ill with tuberculosis during the Olympics and later died from the disease.
