= Germana Malabarba =

Olympic medal record

Women's gymnastics
Silver medal – second place	1928 Amsterdam	Team

Germana Malabarba (19 November 1913 – 30 September 2002) was an Italian gymnast who competed in the 1928 Summer Olympics. In 1928 she won the silver medal as member of the Italian gymnastics team.

Malabarba was born in Pavia, where she also died at the age of 88.
