= Virginia Giorgi =

Italian gymnast

Olympic medal record

Women's gymnastics
Silver medal – second place	1928 Amsterdam	Team

Virginia Giorgi (24 February 1914 – 6 October 1991) was an Italian gymnast who competed in the 1928 Summer Olympics. In 1928, she won the silver medal as member of the Italian gymnastics team.
