= Luigina Giavotti =

Italian gymnast

Olympic medal record

Women's gymnastics
Silver medal – second place	1928 Amsterdam	Team

Luigina Giavotti (October 12, 1916 – August 4, 1976) was an Italian gymnast who competed in the 1928 Summer Olympics. In 1928 she won the silver medal as a member of the Italian gymnastics team.

She was the youngest medalist of the Amsterdam Games and also the youngest female Olympic medalist of all time at the age of 11 years and 302 days. Her record cannot be beaten because the current rules for gymnasts in the Olympics say that they must be at least 16 years old in order to compete.
