= Rita Vittadini =

Italian athlete (1914–2000)

Olympic medal record

Women's gymnastics
Silver medal – second place	1928 Amsterdam	Team

Rita Vittadini (March 19, 1914 – April 25, 2000) was an Italian gymnast who competed in the 1928 Summer Olympics. In 1928 she won the silver medal as a member of the Italian gymnastics team.
