= Anna Tanzini =

Italian gymnast

Medal record

Women's gymnastics

Representing Italy

Olympic Games
Silver medal – second place	1928 Amsterdam	Team

Anna Luisa Tanzini (born 14 July 1914, date of death unknown) was an Italian gymnast who competed in the 1928 Summer Olympics. In 1928 she won the silver medal as member of the Italian gymnastics team.
