= Luigina Perversi =

Italian gymnast (1914–1983)

Olympic medal record

Women's gymnastics
Silver medal – second place	1928 Amsterdam	Team

Luigina Perversi (3 February 1914 – 26 October 1983) was an Italian gymnast who competed in the 1928 Summer Olympics. In 1928 she won the silver medal as member of the Italian gymnastics team.

Perversi was born in Pavia in 1914, where she died in 1983 at the age of 69.
