= Lavinia Gianoni =

Italian gymnast

Olympic medal record

Women's gymnastics
Silver medal – second place	1928 Amsterdam	Team

Lavinia Gianoni (31 August 1911 – 20 December 2005) was an Italian gymnast who competed in the 1928 Summer Olympics. In 1928 she won the silver medal as member of the Italian gymnastics team.

1928 was the first women's Olympic gymnastics event where five teams competed. Lavinia Gianoni was the oldest member of the Italian gymnastics team in 1928 at 17 years of age.
