= Jacomina van den Berg =

Dutch artistic gymnast

Olympic medal record

Women's gymnastics

Representing the Netherlands
| Gold medal – first place | 1928 Amsterdam | Team |

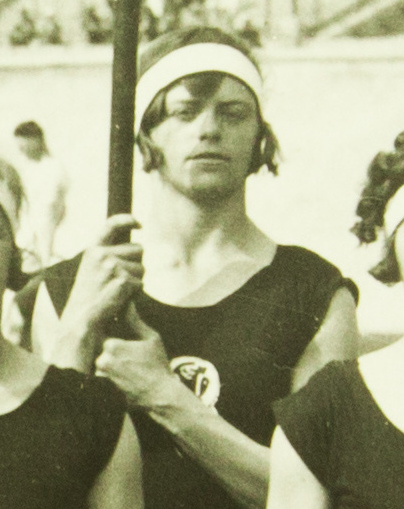
Jacomina van den Berg in 1928

Jacomina "Mien" Elisabeth Sophia van den Berg (28 December 1909 - 14 November 1996) was a Dutch gymnast who competed in the 1928 Summer Olympics, earning a gold medal.
