= Petronella van Randwijk =

Dutch artistic gymnast

Olympic medal record

Women's gymnastics

Representing the Netherlands
Gold medal – first place	1928 Amsterdam	Team

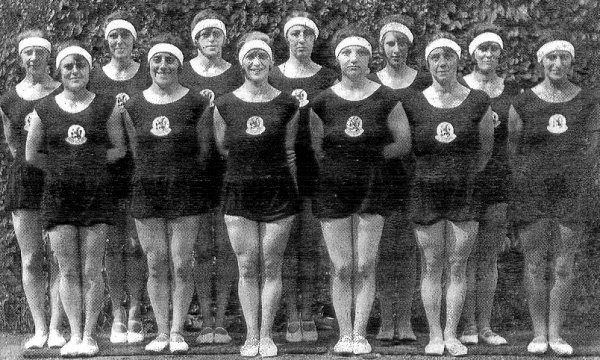

Petronella "Nel" Phillemina Johanna van Randwijk (14 September 1905 – 21 September 1978) was a Dutch gymnast. She won the gold medal as member of the Dutch gymnastics team at the 1928 Summer Olympics in Amsterdam. She was born in Utrecht and died in The Hague.
