= Anna van der Vegt =

Dutch gymnast

- Born: 4 December 1903 The Hague
- Died: 13 April 1983 (aged 79) Rijswijk

Gymnastics career
- Discipline: Women's artistic gymnastics
- Country represented: Netherlands
Medal record
Women's gymnastics
Representing the Netherlands
Olympic Games
Gold medal – first place	1928 Amsterdam	Team

Anna "Annie" Maria van der Vegt (4 December 1903 – 13 April 1983) was a Dutch gymnast who competed in the 1928 Summer Olympics.

In 1928 she won the gold medal as member of the Dutch gymnastics team. Reflecting on her experience at the Olympics in 1978, she noted that there was not yet an Olympic Village and that the gymnasts slept in a school. They were also allowed to watch other events, and she said, "I wanted to see the Games at all cost, but I did not have any money and the cheapest way to go was, of course, to participate".

She was born in The Hague and died in Rijswijk.
