= Jacoba Stelma =

Dutch artistic gymnast

Olympic medal record

Women's gymnastics

Representing the Netherlands
Gold medal – first place	1928 Amsterdam	Team

Jacoba Cornelia "Co" Stelma (2 July 1907 – 30 August 1987) was a Dutch gymnast. She won the gold medal as a member of the Dutch gymnastics team at the 1928 Summer Olympics. She was born in The Hague and died in Brielle.
