= Alida van den Bos =

Dutch artistic gymnast

Olympic medal record

Women's gymnastics

Representing the Netherlands
| Gold medal – first place | 1928 Amsterdam | Team |

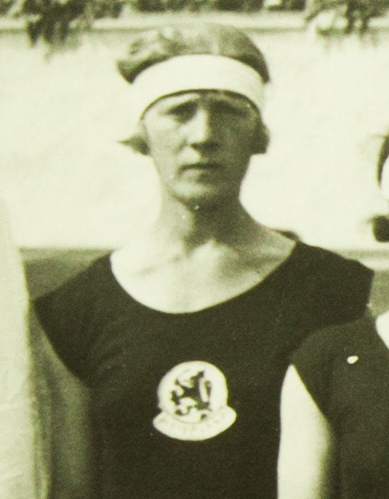
Alida van den Bos in 1928

Alida "Alie" Johanna van den Bos (18 January 1902, in Amsterdam – 16 July 2003, in Amsterdam) was a Dutch gymnast who competed in the 1928 Summer Olympics. She won the gold medal as a member of the Dutch gymnastics team.

== Gymnastics career ==
She began gymnastics when she was 16. Reflecting on her training experience in the run-up to the Olympics, she said that their coach had them begin practicing outdoors on weekends in the last two months before the Games, as the competition would be held outside rather than in a gym. After the Olympics, she became a teacher but stayed involved in gymnastics. She was a coach for the Dutch team that placed fifth at the 1948 Summer Olympics.

== Award ==
In 2000, when she was 98 years old, she was awarded the Silver Olympic Order.

== Death ==
Van den Bos died in 2003 at age 101. She was the last member of the 1928 Amsterdam Olympics gymnastics team to die and was the oldest Olympic champion at the time of her death. Her coach, four of her female teammates, and seven of the men were murdered in the Holocaust, most of them in the Sobibor concentration camp.
