= Hendrika van Rumt =

Dutch artistic gymnast

Olympic medal record

Women's gymnastics

Representing the Netherlands
Gold medal – first place	1928 Amsterdam	Team

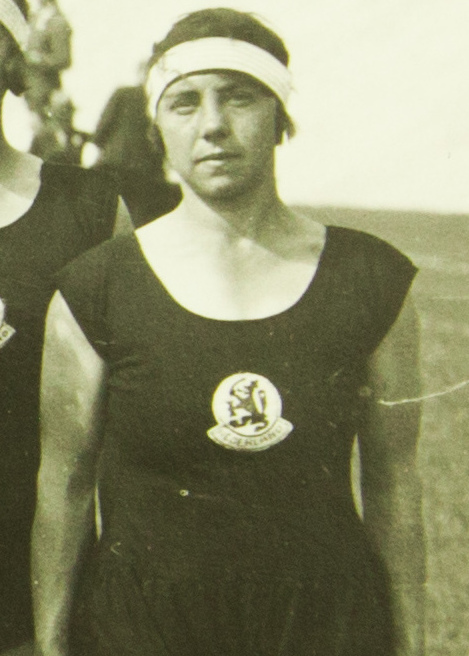
Hendrika van Rumt in 1928

Hendrika "Riek" Alida van Rumt (28 August 1897 in Amsterdam – 26 May 1985 in Amsterdam) was a Dutch gymnast. She won the gold medal as member of the Dutch gymnastics team at the 1928 Summer Olympics in her native city.
