= Petronella Burgerhof =

Dutch artistic gymnast

Olympic medal record

Women's gymnastics

Representing the Netherlands
Gold medal – first place	1928 Amsterdam	Team

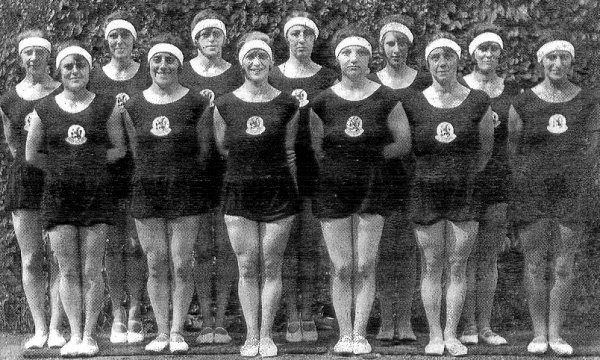

Petronella "Nel" Burgerhof (6 December 1908 – 15 September 1991) was a Dutch gymnast who won the gold medal as member of the Dutch gymnastics team in the 1928 Summer Olympics.

In 1931 Burgerhorf married Toon Houtschild in her hometown. She was born and died in The Hague.
