= Helena Nordheim =

Dutch artistic gymnast (1903–1943)

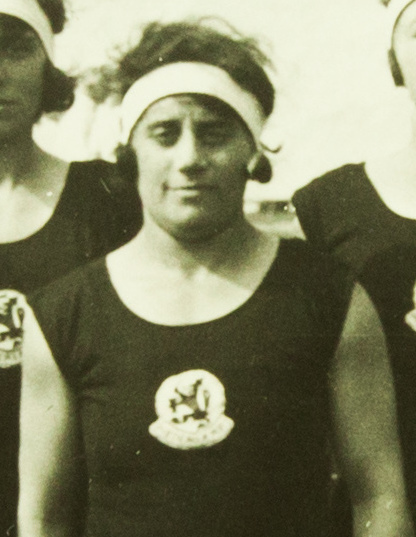
- Helena Nordheim in 1928

Personal information
- Born: 1 August 1903 Amsterdam
- Died: 2 July 1943 (aged 39) Sobibor extermination camp

Gymnastics career
- Discipline: Women's artistic gymnastics
- Country represented: Netherlands
Medal record
Women's gymnastics
Representing the Netherlands
Summer Olympics
Gold medal – first place	1928 Amsterdam	Team

Helena "Lea" Nordheim (1 August 1903 – 2 July 1943) was a Dutch gymnast. She won the gold medal as a member of the Dutch gymnastics team at the 1928 Summer Olympics in her native Amsterdam. With her team, she was inducted into the International Jewish Sports Hall of Fame in 1997.

Nordheim was born in Amsterdam and was murdered in the Sobibor extermination camp. As a Jew, she was sent to Westerbork concentration camp in June 1943. Shortly after, Nordheim was deported to Sobibór where she was murdered, together with her husband Abraham and their ten-year-old daughter Rebecca.

== See also ==
- List of select Jewish gymnasts
