= Jud Simons =

Dutch artistic gymnast

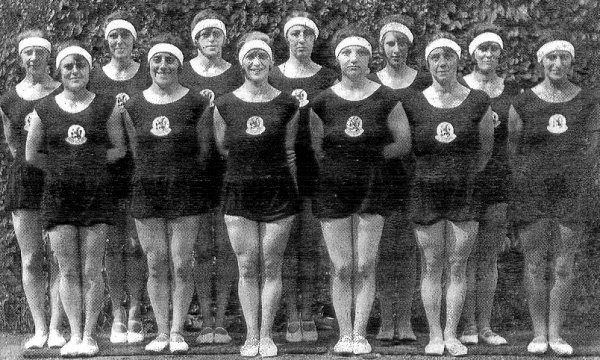
- 1928 Summer Olympic gold medal gymnastic team. Jud Simons is third from the right.

Personal information
- Born: 20 August 1904 The Hague
- Died: 20 March 1943 (aged 38) Sobibor extermination camp

Gymnastics career
- Discipline: Women's artistic gymnastics
- Country represented: Netherlands
Medal record
Women's gymnastics
Representing the Netherlands
Summer Olympics
Gold medal – first place	1928 Amsterdam	Team

Judikje "Jud" Simons (20 August 1904 – 20 March 1943) was a Dutch Jewish gymnast who competed in the 1928 Summer Olympics.

In 1928 she was chosen as a reserve member of the Dutch gymnastics team and won the gold medal with her teammates. The team was inducted into the International Jewish Sports Hall of Fame in 1997.

She was born in The Hague and was murdered in Sobibor extermination camp together with her husband Bernard, their five-year-old daughter Sonja and their three-year-old son Leon.
