= List of gymnasts at the 1936 Summer Olympics =

Olympic Gymnasts

This is a list of the gymnasts who represented their country at the 1936 Summer Olympics in Berlin from 1 to 16 August 1936. Only one discipline, artistic gymnastics, was included in the Games.

== Female artistic gymnasts ==
	Name	Country	Date of birth (Age)
Youngest competitor	Elda Cividino	Italy	13 December 1921 (aged 14)
Oldest competitor	Friedl Iby	Germany	6 April 1905 (aged 31)

NOC	Name	Date of birth (Age)	Hometown
Czechoslovakia	Jaroslava Bajerová	1 April 1910 (aged 26)	Brno, Moravia
Czechoslovakia	Vlasta Děkanová	5 September 1909 (aged 26)	Prague, Bohemia
Czechoslovakia	Božena Dobešová	2 October 1914 (aged 21)	Stochov, Bohemia
Czechoslovakia	Vlasta Foltová	14 December 1913 (aged 22)	Prague, Bohemia
Czechoslovakia	Anna Hřebřinová	11 November 1908 (aged 27)	Prague, Bohemia
Czechoslovakia	Matylda Pálfyová	11 March 1912 (aged 24)	Kostoľany nad Hornádom, Hungary
Czechoslovakia	Zdeňka Veřmiřovská	27 June 1913 (aged 23)	Kopřivnice, Moravia
Czechoslovakia	Marie Větrovská	26 June 1912 (aged 24)	Prague, Bohemia
Germany	Anita Bärwirth	30 August 1918 (aged 17)	Kiel, Germany
Germany	Erna Bürger	26 July 1909 (aged 27)	Eberswalde, Germany
Germany	Isolde Frölian	8 April 1908 (aged 28)	Dresden, Germany
Germany	Friedl Iby	6 April 1905 (aged 31)	Nuremberg, Germany
Germany	Trudi Meyer	13 July 1914 (aged 22)	Hanover, Germany
Germany	Paula Pöhlsen	11 September 1913 (aged 22)	Hamburg, Germany
Germany	Julie Schmitt	6 April 1913 (aged 23)	Cham, Germany
Germany	Käthe Sohnemann	6 May 1913 (aged 23)	Hamburg, Germany
Great Britain	Doris Blake	2 November 1911 (aged 24)	Edmonton, London
Great Britain	Brenda Crowe	31 July 1913 (aged 23)	Edmonton, London
Great Britain	Edna Gross	12 December 1910 (aged 25)	
Great Britain	Clarice Hanson	23 March 1911 (aged 25)	Bradford, West Yorkshire
Great Britain	Mary Heaton	24 February 1911 (aged 25)	Bingley, West Yorkshire
Great Britain	Mary Kelly	30 May 1907 (aged 29)	
Great Britain	Lilian Ridgewell	19 November 1912 (aged 23)	Edmonton, London
Great Britain	Marion Wharton	16 July 1908 (aged 28)	Keighley, West Yorkshire
Hungary	Margit Csillik	18 November 1914 (aged 21)	Budapest, Hungary
Hungary	Margit Kalocsai	27 December 1909 (aged 26)	Budapest, Hungary
Hungary	Ilona Madary	23 June 1916 (aged 20)	Budapest, Hungary
Hungary	Gabriella Mészáros	14 December 1913 (aged 22)	Budapest, Hungary
Hungary	Margit Nagy	29 May 1921 (aged 15)	Debrecen, Hungary
Hungary	Olga Tőrös	4 August 1914 (aged 21)	Debrecen, Hungary
Hungary	Judit Tóth	27 December 1906 (aged 29)	Budapest, Hungary
Hungary	Eszter Voit	11 January 1916 (aged 20)	Budapest, Hungary
Italy	Anna Avanzini	19 November 1917 (aged 18)	Busto Arsizio, Italy
Italy	Vittoria Avanzini	8 February 1915 (aged 21)	Busto Arsizio, Italy
Italy	Clara Bimbocci	16 April 1919 (aged 17)	Lucca, Italy
Italy	Ebore Canella	23 March 1913 (aged 23)	Sestri Ponente, Italy
Italy	Pina Cipriotto	14 March 1911 (aged 25)	Muggia, Italy
Italy	Elda Cividino	13 December 1921 (aged 14)	Trieste, Italy
Italy	Gianna Guaita	26 April 1911 (aged 25)	Busto Arsizio, Italy
Italy	Carmela Toso	30 September 1912 (aged 23)	Trieste, Italy
Poland	Alina Cichecka	2 September 1916 (aged 19)	Warsaw, Poland
Poland	Stefania Krupa	14 December 1909 (aged 26)	Warsaw, Poland
Poland	Marta Majowska	17 July 1911 (aged 25)	Chorzów, Poland
Poland	Wiesława Noskiewicz	13 July 1911 (aged 25)	Warsaw, Poland
Poland	Matylda Ossadnik	17 March 1917 (aged 19)	Bytom, Poland
Poland	Klara Sierońska	28 July 1913 (aged 23)	Chorzów, Poland
Poland	Janina Skirlińska	8 March 1907 (aged 29)	Żurawiczki, Poland
Poland	Julia Wojciechowska	5 May 1915 (aged 21)	Mielec, Poland
United States	Jennie Caputo	5 January 1918 (aged 18)	Newark, New Jersey
United States	Consetta Caruccio	26 September 1918 (aged 17)	Allegany, New York
United States	Margaret Duff	19 October 1917 (aged 18)	Philadelphia, Pennsylvania
United States	Irma Haubold	20 November 1908 (aged 27)	Union City, New Jersey
United States	Marie Kibler	29 June 1912 (aged 24)	Atlantic City, New Jersey
United States	Ada Lunardoni	8 March 1911 (aged 25)	West Hoboken, New Jersey
United States	Adelaide Meyer	4 June 1906 (aged 30)	Brooklyn, New York
United States	Mary Wright	30 July 1908 (aged 28)	San Antonio, Texas
Yugoslavia	Dragana Đorđević	2 June 1914 (aged 22)	Kingdom of Serbia
Yugoslavia	Ančka Goropenko	29 October 1914 (aged 21)	Ljubljana, Croatia-Slavonia
Yugoslavia	Katarina Hribar	28 October 1913 (aged 22)	Ljubljana, Croatia-Slavonia
Yugoslavia	Marta Pustišek	21 February 1917 (aged 19)	Ljubljana, Croatia-Slavonia
Yugoslavia	Dušica Radivojević	25 January 1914 (aged 22)	Kingdom of Serbia
Yugoslavia	Olga Rajković	13 April 1913 (aged 23)	Kingdom of Serbia
Yugoslavia	Lidija Rupnik	20 February 1915 (aged 21)	Trieste, Italy
Yugoslavia	Maja Veršeć	23 October 1916 (aged 19)	Zagreb, Croatia-Slavonia

== Male artistic gymnasts ==
	Name	Country	Date of birth (Age)
Youngest competitor	Lyuben Obretenov	Bulgaria	1 July 1918 (aged 18)
Oldest competitor	Leon Štukelj	Yugoslavia	12 November 1898 (aged 37)

NOC	Name	Date of birth (Age)	Hometown
Austria	Gottfried Hermann	22 June 1910 (aged 26)	
Austria	Pius Hollenstein	3 November 1907 (aged 28)	
Austria	Karl Pannos	16 September 1908 (aged 27)	Vienna, Austria
Austria	Robert Pranz	22 October 1905 (aged 30)	
Austria	Leopold Redl	1 August 1907 (aged 29)	
Austria	Adolf Scheffknecht	4 October 1914 (aged 21)	Bregenz, Austria
Austria	August Sturm	1 February 1912 (aged 24)	
Austria	Franz Swoboda	28 January 1909 (aged 27)	
Bulgaria	Ivan Chureshki	6 September 1908 (aged 27)	
Bulgaria	Georgi Dimitrov	27 January 1911 (aged 25)	
Bulgaria	Yovcho Khristov	25 February 1913 (aged 23)	
Bulgaria	Neno Mirchev	9 September 1909 (aged 26)	
Bulgaria	Lyuben Obretenov	1 July 1918 (aged 18)	Ruse, Bulgaria
Bulgaria	Pando Sidov	15 May 1910 (aged 26)	
Bulgaria	Ivan Stoychev	6 July 1909 (aged 27)	
Czechoslovakia	Jan Gajdoš	27 December 1903 (aged 32)	Brno, Moravia
Czechoslovakia	Alois Hudec	12 July 1908 (aged 28)	Račice, Bohemia
Czechoslovakia	Jaroslav Kollinger	13 December 1905 (aged 30)	Roudnice nad Labem, Bohemia
Czechoslovakia	Emanuel Löffler	29 December 1901 (aged 34)	Mezíříčko, Moravia
Czechoslovakia	Vratislav Petráček	22 February 1910 (aged 26)	České Budějovice, Bohemia
Czechoslovakia	Bohumil Povejšil	15 July 1912 (aged 24)	Prague, Bohemia
Czechoslovakia	Jan Sládek	23 February 1907 (aged 29)	Vracov, Moravia
Czechoslovakia	Jindřich Tintěra	7 February 1901 (aged 35)	Prague, Bohemia
Finland	Mauri Nyberg-Noroma	31 January 1908 (aged 28)	Vyborg, Finland
Finland	Ilmari Pakarinen	12 September 1910 (aged 25)	Vyborg, Finland
Finland	Aleksanteri Saarvala	9 April 1913 (aged 23)	Vyborg, Finland
Finland	Heikki Savolainen	28 September 1907 (aged 28)	Joensuu, Finland
Finland	Esa Seeste	4 July 1913 (aged 23)	Vyborg, Finland
Finland	Einari Teräsvirta	7 December 1914 (aged 21)	Vyborg, Finland
Finland	Eino Tukiainen	1 January 1915 (aged 21)	Vyborg, Finland
Finland	Martti Uosikkinen	20 August 1909 (aged 26)	Kuopio, Finland
France	Jean Aubry	18 March 1913 (aged 23)	Chartres, France
France	Robert Herold	13 November 1910 (aged 25)	Strasbourg, France
France	Paul Masino	28 September 1911 (aged 24)	Lyon, France
France	Lucien Masset	11 May 1914 (aged 22)	Lyon, France
France	Maurice Rousseau	28 September 1906 (aged 29)	La Machine, France
France	Antoine Schildwein	10 August 1911 (aged 24)	Sarreguemines, France
France	Armand Solbach	10 May 1904 (aged 32)	Neuilly-Plaisance, France
France	Armand Walter	5 April 1908 (aged 28)	Pfastatt, France
Germany	Franz Beckert	13 March 1907 (aged 29)	Neustadt, Germany
Germany	Konrad Frey	24 April 1909 (aged 27)	Bad Kreuznach, Germany
Germany	Alfred Schwarzmann	23 March 1912 (aged 24)	Fürth, Germany
Germany	Willi Stadel	9 July 1912 (aged 24)	Konstanz, Germany
Germany	Innozenz Stangl	11 March 1911 (aged 25)	Jesenwang, Germany
Germany	Walter Steffens	26 December 1908 (aged 27)	Barnstorf, Germany
Germany	Matthias Volz	4 May 1910 (aged 26)	Schwabach, Germany
Germany	Ernst Winter	30 October 1907 (aged 28)	Frankfurt, Germany
Hungary	József Hegedűs	7 January 1910 (aged 26)	Újpest, Hungary
Hungary	Gábor Kecskeméti	30 January 1912 (aged 24)	Békés, Hungary
Hungary	Győző Mogyorossy	23 December 1914 (aged 21)	Debrecen, Hungary
Hungary	István Pelle	26 July 1907 (aged 29)	Budapest, Hungary
Hungary	Miklós Péter	27 April 1906 (aged 30)	Budapest, Hungary
Hungary	István Sárkány	5 August 1913 (aged 22)	Turda, Hungary
Hungary	József Sarlós	8 July 1909 (aged 27)	Štúrovo, Hungary
Hungary	Lajos Tóth	25 August 1914 (aged 21)	Debrecen, Hungary
Italy	Egidio Armelloni	22 July 1909 (aged 27)	Soresina, Italy
Italy	Oreste Capuzzo	7 December 1908 (aged 27)	Rivarolo, Italy
Italy	Danilo Fioravanti	23 August 1913 (aged 22)	Berra, Italy
Italy	Savino Guglielmetti	26 November 1911 (aged 24)	Milan, Italy
Italy	Romeo Neri	26 March 1903 (aged 33)	Rimini, Italy
Italy	Otello Ternelli	23 November 1912 (aged 23)	Modena, Italy
Italy	Franco Tognini	26 October 1907 (aged 28)	Monza, Italy
Italy	Nicolò Tronci	6 April 1905 (aged 31)	Genoa, Italy
Japan	Hikoroku Arimoto	11 October 1915 (aged 20)	
Japan	Fujio Kakuta	27 January 1911 (aged 25)	Shizuoka Prefecture, Japan
Japan	Hiroshi Matsunobu	15 October 1915 (aged 20)	
Japan	Yoshio Miyake	7 December 1913 (aged 22)	
Japan	Hiroshi Nosaka	1 October 1914 (aged 21)	Tokyo, Japan
Japan	Dokan Sone	30 October 1914 (aged 21)	Jōetsu, Japan
Japan	Yoshitaka Takeda	15 February 1911 (aged 25)	Asakura, Japan
Japan	Kiichiro Toyama	22 November 1909 (aged 26)	Hitachi, Japan
Luxembourg	Jos Cillien	19 July 1911 (aged 25)	Esch-sur-Alzette, Luxembourg
Luxembourg	Mathias Erang	1 May 1902 (aged 34)	Malstatt-Burbach, Germany
Luxembourg	Franz Haupert	27 October 1907 (aged 28)	Clemency, Luxembourg
Luxembourg	Willy Klein	11 October 1912 (aged 23)	Dudelange, Luxembourg
Luxembourg	Jey Kugeler	18 April 1910 (aged 26)	Schifflange, Luxembourg
Luxembourg	Marcel Leineweber	7 December 1912 (aged 23)	Pétange, Luxembourg
Luxembourg	Metty Logelin	24 April 1907 (aged 29)	Differdange, Luxembourg
Luxembourg	Jos Romersa	1 November 1915 (aged 20)	Dudelange, Luxembourg
Romania	Andrei Abraham	7 October 1916 (aged 19)	Cluj-Napoca, Romania
Romania	Ion Albert	2 June 1910 (aged 26)	Cluj-Napoca, Romania
Romania	Alexandru Dan	26 July 1907 (aged 29)	
Romania	Francisc Drăghici	1 June 1913 (aged 23)	Reșița, Romania
Romania	Remus Ludu	13 May 1914 (aged 22)	Târgu Lăpuș, Romania
Romania	Iosif Matusec	15 February 1907 (aged 29)	Arad, Romania
Romania	Vasile Moldovan	28 August 1911 (aged 24)	Cluj-Napoca, Romania
Romania	Iohan Schmidt	17 January 1910 (aged 26)	
Switzerland	Walter Bach	10 December 1909 (aged 26)	
Switzerland	Albert Bachmann	8 November 1906 (aged 29)	
Switzerland	Walter Beck	20 November 1907 (aged 28)	
Switzerland	Eugen Mack	21 September 1907 (aged 28)	Arbon, Switzerland
Switzerland	Georges Miez	2 October 1904 (aged 31)	Töss, Switzerland
Switzerland	Michael Reusch	3 February 1914 (aged 22)	Rothrist, Switzerland
Switzerland	Eduard Steinemann	2 August 1906 (aged 29)	
Switzerland	Josef Walter	1 December 1901 (aged 34)	
United States	Frank Cumiskey	6 September 1912 (aged 23)	West New York, New Jersey
United States	Kenny Griffin	27 January 1912 (aged 24)	Logan, Utah
United States	Frank Haubold	23 March 1906 (aged 30)	Union City, New Jersey
United States	Al Jochim	12 June 1902 (aged 34)	Berlin, Germany
United States	Fred Meyer	9 August 1910 (aged 25)	New York, New York
United States	Chet Phillips	23 October 1913 (aged 22)	Philadelphia, Pennsylvania
United States	Artie Pitt	14 August 1913 (aged 22)	West New York, New Jersey
United States	George Wheeler	14 December 1914 (aged 21)	Pittsburgh, Pennsylvania
Yugoslavia	Miroslav Forte	24 October 1911 (aged 24)	Trbovlje, Croatia-Slavonia
Yugoslavia	Boris Gregorka	2 August 1906 (aged 29)	Brežice, Croatia-Slavonia
Yugoslavia	Konrad Grilc	25 October 1909 (aged 26)	Celje, Croatia-Slavonia
Yugoslavia	Dimitrije Merzlikin	6 November 1914 (aged 21)	
Yugoslavia	Josip Primožič	7 February 1900 (aged 36)	Ljubljana, Croatia-Slavonia
Yugoslavia	Janez Pristov	10 January 1907 (aged 29)	Jesenice, Croatia-Slavonia
Yugoslavia	Leon Štukelj	12 November 1898 (aged 37)	Novo Mesto, Croatia-Slavonia
Yugoslavia	Jože Vadnov	5 July 1912 (aged 24)	Ljubljana, Croatia-Slavonia
