= Italy women's national artistic gymnastics team =

Italy
- Continental union: European Union of Gymnastics
- National federation: Italian Gymnastics Federation

Olympic Games
- Appearances: 14
- Medals: Silver: 1928, 2024

World Championships
- Medals: Bronze: 1950, 2019

Junior World Championships
- Medals: Bronze: 2023

European Championships
- Medals: Gold: 2006, 2022, 2024, 2025; Silver: 2023, 2026; Bronze: 2002, 2012

The Italy women's national artistic gymnastics team represents Italy in FIG international competitions.

== History ==
Italy has participated in the Olympic Games women's team competition 14 times. It has won two medals, both silver in 1928 and 2024. The team has also won two medals at the World Artistic Gymnastics Championships, a bronze in both 1950 and 2019. They won the team gold at the 2006, 2022, 2024, and 2025 European Championships.

At the 2024 Olympic Games in Paris, Alice D'Amato became the first Italian female artistic gymnast to win an Olympic gold medal after winning one on the balance beam.

== Senior roster ==
Name	Birth date and age	Birthplace	Club
Angela Andreoli	June 6, 2006 (age 20)	Brescia	Brixia
Chiara Barzasi	November 3, 2007 (age 19)	Songavazzo	Renato Serra
Arianna Belardelli	January 1, 2007 (age 19)	Roma	Ginnastica Heaven
Alice D'Amato	February 7, 2003 (age 23)	Genova	Brixia
Asia D'Amato	February 7, 2003 (age 23)	Genova	Brixia
Nunzia Dercenno	2006	Italie	Ginnastica Salerno
Manila Esposito	November 2, 2006 (age 20)	Boscotrecase	Ginnastica Civitavecchia / Brexia
Camilla Ferrari	2008	Italie	Brixia
Elisa Iorio	March 21, 2003 (age 23)	Modena	Brixia
Martina Maggio	July 26, 2001 (age 25)	Villasanta	Brixia
Veronica Mandriota	February 28, 2005 (age 21)	Brescia	Brixia
July Marano	September 23, 2008 (age 18)	Italie	Ginnastica Civitavecchia
Sofia Tonelli	November 18, 2007 (age 19)	Italie	Saltavanti Empoli
Giorgia Villa	February 23, 2003 (age 23)	Ponte San Pietro	Brixia

== Team competition results ==
=== Olympic Games ===
Year	Position	Squad
1928	Silver medal	Bianca Ambrosetti, Lavinia Gianoni, Luigina Giavotti, Virginia Giorgi, Germana Malabarba, Carla Marangoni, Luigina Perversi, Diana Pizzavini, Luisa Tanzini, Carolina Tronconi, Ines Vercesi, Rita Vittadini
1936	7th place	Anna Avanzini, Vittoria Avanzini, Clara Bimbocci, Ebore Canella, Pina Cipriotto, Elda Cividino, Gianna Guaita, Carmela Toso
1948	8th place	Renata Bianchi, Norma Icardi, Licia Macchini, Laura Micheli, Wanda Nuti, Luciana Pezzoni, Elena Santoni, Lilia Torriani
1952	6th place	Renata Bianchi, Grazia Bozzo, Miranda Cicognani, Elisabetta Durelli, Licia Macchini, Lidia Pitteri, Luciana Reali, Liliana Scaricabarozzi
1956	7th place	Elisa Calsi, Miranda Cicognani, Rosella Cicognani, Elena Lagorara, Luciana Lagorara, Luciana Reali
1960	10th place	Miranda Cicognani, Rosella Cicognani, Francesca Costa, Elena Lagorara, Gabriella Santarelli, Wanda Soprani
1972	12th place	Angela Alberti, Cinzia Delisi, Maria Grazia Mancuso, Gabriella Marchi, Rita Peri, Monica Stefani
1976	12th place	Stefania Bucci, Patrizia Fratini, Rita Peri, Donatella Sacchi, Valentina Spongia, Carla Wieser
1980	boycott	—N/a
2000	11th place	Monica Bergamelli, Martina Bremini, Alice Capitani, Irene Castelli, Adriana Crisci, Laura Trefiletti
2008	10th place	Francesca Benolli, Monica Bergamelli, Vanessa Ferrari, Carlotta Giovannini, Federica Macrì, Lia Parolari
2012	7th place	Giorgia Campana, Erika Fasana, Carlotta Ferlito, Vanessa Ferrari, Elisabetta Preziosa
2016	10th place	Erika Fasana, Carlotta Ferlito, Vanessa Ferrari, Elisa Meneghini, Martina Rizzelli
2020	4th place	Alice D'Amato, Asia D'Amato, Vanessa Ferrari, Martina Maggio
2024	Silver medal	Angela Andreoli, Alice D'Amato, Manila Esposito, Elisa Iorio, Giorgia Villa

=== World Championships ===
Year	Position	Squad
1950	Bronze medal	Renata Bianchi, Licia Macchini, Laura Micheli, Anna Monlarini, Marja Nutti, Elena Santoni, Liliana Scaricabarozzi, Lilia Torriani
1954	5th place	Elisa Calsi, Miranda Cicognani, Luciana Lagorara, Licia Macchini, Luciana Reali, Gabriella Santarelli, Liliana Scaricabarozzi, Maria Storici
1974	13th place	Carmen Basla, Stefania Bucci, Serenella Codato, Cinzia Delisi, Gabriella Marchi, Rita Peri
1978	14th place	Loana Biffi, Marinella Giorgini, Donatella Grossi, Caterina Miglioranza, Monica Valentini
1979	27th place	Laura Bortolaso, Cristina Brambati, Elisabetta Grassi, Donatella Grossi, Caterina Miglioranza, Paola Pasteris
1983	15th place	Laura Bortolaso, Anna di Mattia, Gianpiera Gambaro, Elena Ghiselli, Leonilde Iannuzzi, Josella Lombardi
1985	14th place	Cristina Casubolo, Elena Ghiselli, Patrizia Luconi, Michela Pistacchi, Rossana Venegoni, Giulia Volpi
1987	14th place	Maria Cocuzza, Patrizia Luconi, Barbara Righetto, Rossana Venegoni, Giulia Volpi, Floriana Zanetti
1989	14th place	Selene Celotto, Lara Filippi, Roberta Kirchmayer, Elena Marcelloni, Alessandra Vietti, Giulia Volpi
1991	15th place	Stefania Copelli, Carmen Falzarano, Chiara Ferrazzi, Valentina Rubinetti, Daniela Vairo, Giulia Volpi
1997	15th place	Elisa Lamperti, Ilenia Meneghesso, Francesca Morotti, Tania Rebagliati, Paola Rivi, Giordana Rocchi
2003	15th place	Monica Bergamelli, Ilaria Colombo, Cristina Cavalli, Maria Teresa Gargano, Marika Pestrin, Ilaria Rosso
2006	9th place	Monica Bergamelli, Sara Bradaschia, Lorena Coza, Vanessa Ferrari, Carlotta Giovannini, Federica Macrì
2007	4th place	Francesca Benolli, Monica Bergamelli, Vanessa Ferrari, Federica Macrì, Lia Parolari, Silvia Zanolo
2010	8th place	Vanessa Ferrari, Serena Licchetta, Jessica Mattoni, Lia Parolari, Elisabetta Preziosa, Eleonora Rando
2011	9th place	Emily Armi, Giorgia Campana, Carlotta Ferlito, Chiara Gandolfi, Vanessa Ferrari, Elisabetta Preziosa
2014	5th place	Giorgia Campana, Erika Fasana, Vanessa Ferrari, Lavinia Marongiu, Lara Mori, Martina Rizzelli
2015	7th place	Erika Fasana, Vanessa Ferrari, Carlotta Ferlito, Enus Mariani, Elisa Meneghini, Lara Mori, Tea Ugrin; Ferrari competed in the qualifications round but subsequently withdrew with an injury. Mariani replaced her for the team final.
2018	12th place	Martina Basile, Irene Lanza, Lara Mori, Sara Ricciardi, Martina Rizzelli
2019	Bronze medal	Desiree Carofiglio, Alice D'Amato, Asia D'Amato, Elisa Iorio, Giorgia Villa, Martina Maggio
2022	5th place	Alice D'Amato, Manila Esposito, Martina Maggio, Veronica Mandriota, Giorgia Villa, Elisa Iorio
2023	5th place	Angela Andreoli, Arianna Belardelli, Alice D'Amato, Manila Esposito, Elisa Iorio
2026	7th place	Manila Esposito, Elisa Iorio, July Marano, Giulia Perotti, Sofia Tonelli, Anthea Sisio

=== Junior World Championships ===
Year	Position	Squad
2019	9th place	Camilla Campagnaro, Micol Minotti, Chiara Vincenzi, Veronica Mandriota
2023	Bronze medal	Caterina Gaddi, July Marano, Giulia Perotti, Matilde Ferrari
2025	6th place	Eleonora Calaciura, Mia Proietti, Anthea Sisio, Michelle Tapia

== Most decorated gymnasts ==
This list includes all Italian female artistic gymnasts who have won a medal at the Olympic Games or the World Artistic Gymnastics Championships.

Rank	Gymnast	Team	AA	VT	UB	BB	FX	Olympic Total	World Total	Total
1	Vanessa Ferrari		2006; 2007		2006		2020; 2013; 2006	1	5	6
2	Alice D'Amato	2024; 2019				2024		2	1	3
3	Asia D'Amato	2019		2021				0	2	2
3	Manila Esposito	2024				2024		2	0	2
3	Elisa Iorio	2024; 2019						1	1	2
3	Marja Nutti	1950				1950		0	2	2
3	Giorgia Villa	2024; 2019						1	1	2
8	Licia Macchini	1950				1950		0	2	2
9	Ambrosetti, Gianoni, Giavotti, Giorgi, Malabarba, Marangoni, Perversi, Pizzavini, Tanzini, Tronconi, Vercesi, Vittadini	1928						1	0	1
9	Angela Andreoli	2024						1	0	1
22	Bianchi, Micheli, Monlarini, Santoni, Scaricabarozzi, Torriani	1950						0	1	1
22	Desiree Carofiglio, Martina Maggio	2019						0	1	1

== Best international results ==
Event	TF	AA	VT	UB	BB	FX
Olympic Games	2nd place, silver medalist(s)	4	6	5	1st place, gold medalist(s)	2nd place, silver medalist(s)
World Championships	3rd place, bronze medalist(s)	1st place, gold medalist(s)	2nd place, silver medalist(s)	3rd place, bronze medalist(s)	2nd place, silver medalist(s)	2nd place, silver medalist(s)
European Games	5	5		6	14	12
European Championships	1st place, gold medalist(s)	1st place, gold medalist(s)	1st place, gold medalist(s)	1st place, gold medalist(s)	1st place, gold medalist(s)	1st place, gold medalist(s)
Youth Olympics	4	1st place, gold medalist(s)	1st place, gold medalist(s)	2nd place, silver medalist(s)	2nd place, silver medalist(s)	1st place, gold medalist(s)
Junior World Championships	3rd place, bronze medalist(s)	3rd place, bronze medalist(s)	2nd place, silver medalist(s)	1st place, gold medalist(s)	8	1st place, gold medalist(s)
Universiade	3rd place, bronze medalist(s)	5		5	2nd place, silver medalist(s)	1st place, gold medalist(s)

== See also ==
- List of Olympic female artistic gymnasts for Italy
- Italy men's national artistic gymnastics team
