= Gymnastics at the 1936 Summer Olympics – Women's artistic team all-around =

Women's artistic team all-around at the Games of the XI Olympiad
- Venue: Waldbühne
- Date: 12 August 1936
- Competitors: 64 from 8 nations
- Winning score: 108.25

Medalists
1st place, gold medalist(s)		Anita Bärwirth; Erna Bürger; Isolde Frölian; Friedl Iby; Trudi Meyer; Paula Pöhlsen; Julie Schmitt; Käthe Sohnemann	Germany
2nd place, silver medalist(s)		Jaroslava Bajerová; Vlasta Děkanová; Božena Dobešová; Vlasta Foltová; Anna Hřebřinová; Matylda Pálfyová; Zdeňka Veřmiřovská; Marie Větrovská	Czechoslovakia
3rd place, bronze medalist(s)		Margit Csillik; Margit Kalocsai; Ilona Madary; Gabriella Mészáros; Margit Nagy; Olga Törös; Judit Tóth; Eszter Voit	Hungary

The women's artistic team all-around competition at the 1936 Summer Olympics was held at the Waldbühne on 12 August. It was the second appearance of the event.

== Competition format ==
The gymnastics format returned to the aggregation format used in 1928, when women's gymnastics debuted at the Olympic Games. Each nation entered a team of eight gymnasts. All entrants in the gymnastics competitions performed both a compulsory exercise and a voluntary exercise on each of the three apparatus, with the scores summed to give a final total. Each team also performed two group exercises. The top six individual scores on each team and the two group exercises were summed to give a team all-around score. No individual medals (for either all-around or apparatus) were awarded for women.

== Results ==
Rank	Nation	Gymnast	Individual results												Group exercises		Team total
Rank	Nation	Gymnast	Vault (gymnastics)			Parallel bars			Balance beam			Individual Totals			Free	Apparatus	Team total
Rank	Nation	Gymnast	C	V	Total	C	V	Total	C	V	Total	C	V	Grand Total	1	2	Team total
1st place, gold medalist(s)	Germany	Trudi Meyer	7.90	13.95	21.85	9.05	14.05	23.10	9.20	13.40	22.60	26.15	41.40	67.55	57.25	51.00	506.50
1st place, gold medalist(s)	Germany	Erna Bürger	8.25	13.80	22.05	8.30	14.05	22.35	8.95	14.10	23.05	25.50	41.95	67.45	57.25	51.00	506.50
1st place, gold medalist(s)	Germany	Käthe Sohnemann	8.20	13.95	22.15	8.55	14.50	23.05	8.55	13.30	21.85	25.30	41.75	67.05	57.25	51.00	506.50
1st place, gold medalist(s)	Germany	Isolde Frölian	8.15	13.85	22.00	8.45	14.20	22.65	7.95	13.15	21.10	24.55	41.20	65.75	57.25	51.00	506.50
1st place, gold medalist(s)	Germany	Anita Bärwirth	8.90	13.55	22.45	8.20	12.90	21.10	8.35	13.55	21.90	25.45	40.00	65.45	57.25	51.00	506.50
1st place, gold medalist(s)	Germany	Paula Pöhlsen	7.80	13.20	21.00	8.15	14.20	22.35	8.10	13.55	21.65	25.30	41.75	65.00	57.25	51.00	506.50
1st place, gold medalist(s)	Germany	Friedl Iby	7.85	12.00	19.85	8.80	14.10	22.90	9.10	11.90	21.00	25.75	38.00	~~63.75~~	57.25	51.00	506.50
1st place, gold medalist(s)	Germany	Julie Schmitt	8.05	11.25	19.30	8.25	13.30	21.55	8.85	12.40	21.25	25.15	36.95	~~62.10~~	57.25	51.00	506.50
1st place, gold medalist(s)	Germany	Totals:	65.10	105.55	170.65	67.75	111.30	179.05	69.05	105.55	170.65	201.90	322.20	524.10	57.25	51.00	506.50
2nd place, silver medalist(s)	Czechoslovakia	Vlasta Foltová	8.15	13.80	21.95	8.20	13.65	21.85	9.15	13.50	22.65	25.50	40.95	66.45	56.85	59.00	503.60
2nd place, silver medalist(s)	Czechoslovakia	Vlasta Děkanová	8.50	13.45	21.95	8.35	14.25	22.60	8.80	12.60	21.40	25.65	40.30	65.95	56.85	59.00	503.60
2nd place, silver medalist(s)	Czechoslovakia	Zdeňka Veřmiřovská	7.75	13.10	20.85	8.00	13.95	21.95	9.00	14.10	23.10	24.75	41.15	65.90	56.85	59.00	503.60
2nd place, silver medalist(s)	Czechoslovakia	Matylda Pálfyová	8.45	13.30	21.75	8.30	13.00	21.30	7.10	13.95	21.05	23.85	40.25	64.10	56.85	59.00	503.60
2nd place, silver medalist(s)	Czechoslovakia	Anna Hřebřinová	8.05	13.15	21.20	7.50	13.50	21.00	8.25	12.25	20.50	23.80	38.90	62.70	56.85	59.00	503.60
2nd place, silver medalist(s)	Czechoslovakia	Božena Dobešová	8.50	12.95	21.45	8.25	13.65	21.90	6.45	12.85	19.30	23.20	39.45	62.65	56.85	59.00	503.60
2nd place, silver medalist(s)	Czechoslovakia	Marie Větrovská	7.95	12.20	20.15	7.60	11.35	18.95	8.90	12.25	21.15	24.45	35.80	~~60.25~~	56.85	59.00	503.60
2nd place, silver medalist(s)	Czechoslovakia	Jaroslava Bajerová	7.90	12.60	20.50	7.35	13.25	20.60	7.00	11.25	18.25	22.25	37.10	~~59.35~~	56.85	59.00	503.60
2nd place, silver medalist(s)	Czechoslovakia	Totals:	65.25	104.55	169.80	63.55	106.60	170.15	64.65	102.75	167.40	193.45	313.90	507.35	56.85	59.00	503.60
3rd place, bronze medalist(s)	Hungary	Margit Csillik	7.60	12.60	20.20	8.75	14.05	22.80	9.20	13.10	22.30	25.55	39.75	65.30	60.60	56.00	499.00
3rd place, bronze medalist(s)	Hungary	Judit Tóth	8.50	13.05	21.55	8.05	13.90	21.95	7.50	13.70	21.20	24.05	40.65	64.70	60.60	56.00	499.00
3rd place, bronze medalist(s)	Hungary	Margit Nagy	6.90	13.05	19.95	8.60	14.40	23.00	8.30	13.30	21.60	23.80	40.75	64.55	60.60	56.00	499.00
3rd place, bronze medalist(s)	Hungary	Gabriella Mészáros	6.85	11.70	18.55	7.80	13.00	20.80	9.15	14.55	23.70	23.80	39.25	63.05	60.60	56.00	499.00
3rd place, bronze medalist(s)	Hungary	Eszter Voit	7.65	12.60	20.25	7.85	13.20	21.05	8.25	13.35	21.60	23.75	39.15	62.90	60.60	56.00	499.00
3rd place, bronze medalist(s)	Hungary	Olga Törös	6.50	12.70	19.20	7.90	12.95	20.85	7.95	13.90	21.85	22.35	39.55	61.90	60.60	56.00	499.00
3rd place, bronze medalist(s)	Hungary	Ilona Madary	7.00	11.65	18.65	7.95	12.70	20.65	8.05	13.90	21.95	23.00	38.25	~~61.25~~	60.60	56.00	499.00
3rd place, bronze medalist(s)	Hungary	Margit Kalocsai	7.25	12.80	20.05	6.80	10.05	16.85	8.95	14.00	22.95	23.00	36.85	~~59.85~~	60.60	56.00	499.00
3rd place, bronze medalist(s)	Hungary	Totals:	58.25	100.15	158.40	63.70	104.25	167.95	67.35	109.80	177.15	189.30	314.20	503.50	60.60	56.00	499.00
4	Yugoslavia	Dušica Radivojević	8.25	11.95	20.20	7.70	13.50	21.20	8.35	12.55	20.90	24.30	38.00	62.30	57.60	57.50	485.60
4	Yugoslavia	Lidija Rupnik	8.25	12.65	20.90	8.10	14.25	22.35	6.50	12.50	19.00	22.85	39.40	62.25	57.60	57.50	485.60
4	Yugoslavia	Marta Pustišek	8.50	12.90	21.40	7.45	12.95	20.40	8.80	11.40	20.20	24.75	37.25	62.00	57.60	57.50	485.60
4	Yugoslavia	Olga Rajković	7.45	12.55	20.00	7.65	13.15	20.80	7.95	13.25	21.20	23.05	38.95	62.00	57.60	57.50	485.60
4	Yugoslavia	Dragana Đorđević	8.15	12.35	20.50	7.55	11.25	18.80	8.90	13.00	21.90	24.60	36.60	61.20	57.60	57.50	485.60
4	Yugoslavia	Ančka Goropenko	7.55	11.90	19.45	7.55	13.40	20.95	7.15	12.60	20.35	22.85	37.90	60.75	57.60	57.50	485.60
4	Yugoslavia	Katarina Hribar	8.15	13.45	21.60	7.75	13.15	20.90	7.70	10.40	18.10	23.60	37.00	~~60.60~~	57.60	57.50	485.60
4	Yugoslavia	Maja Veršeć	7.65	12.65	20.30	5.75	11.55	17.30	8.55	12.50	21.05	21.95	36.70	~~58.65~~	57.60	57.50	485.60
4	Yugoslavia	Totals:	63.95	100.40	164.35	59.50	103.20	162.70	64.50	98.20	162.70	187.95	301.80	489.75	57.60	57.50	485.60
5	United States	Consetta Caruccio-Lenz	7.60	13.25	20.85	8.35	14.60	22.95	9.05	14.00	23.05	25.00	41.85	66.85	51.90	60.85	471.60
5	United States	Jennie Caputo	7.55	13.75	21.30	8.20	14.40	22.60	7.60	13.95	21.55	23.35	42.10	65.45	51.90	60.85	471.60
5	United States	Irma Haubold	7.15	13.00	20.15	7.75	13.55	21.30	8.00	13.00	21.00	22.90	39.55	62.45	51.90	60.85	471.60
5	United States	Margaret Duff	7.15	12.55	19.70	7.45	13.05	20.50	7.00	13.30	20.30	21.45	38.80	60.50	51.90	60.85	471.60
5	United States	Ada Lunardoni	6.70	13.00	19.70	6.80	13.00	19.80	7.95	12.80	20.75	21.45	38.80	60.25	51.90	60.85	471.60
5	United States	Adelaide Meyer	7.10	10.25	17.35	7.05	14.00	21.05	5.60	12.55	18.15	19.75	36.80	56.55	51.90	60.85	471.60
5	United States	Mary Wright	6.50	10.95	17.45	6.90	11.60	18.50	7.90	11.25	19.15	21.30	33.80	~~55.10~~	51.90	60.85	471.60
5	United States	Marie Kibler	-	-	–	5.75	-	5.75	-	-	–	5.75	-	~~5.75~~	51.90	60.85	471.60
5	United States	Totals:	49.75	86.75	136.50	58.25	94.20	152.45	53.10	90.85	143.95	161.10	271.80	432.90	51.90	60.85	471.60
6	Poland	Klara Sierońska	7.35	13.10	20.45	8.05	13.40	21.45	8.90	13.85	22.75	24.30	40.35	64.65	51.90	46.85	470.30
6	Poland	Marta Majowska	7.30	13.50	20.80	8.00	11.95	19.95	8.95	13.45	22.40	24.25	38.90	63.15	51.90	46.85	470.30
6	Poland	Matylda Ossadnik	7.55	12.35	19.90	8.20	14.20	22.40	8.05	12.10	20.15	23.80	38.65	62.45	51.90	46.85	470.30
6	Poland	Wiesława Noskiewicz	7.25	13.15	20.40	7.80	12.05	19.85	7.45	13.70	21.15	22.50	38.90	61.40	51.90	46.85	470.30
6	Poland	Janina Skirlińska	7.75	12.15	19.90	7.40	11.05	18.45	8.25	13.60	21.85	23.40	36.80	60.20	51.90	46.85	470.30
6	Poland	Alina Cichecka	7.30	12.35	19.65	7.85	12.00	19.85	6.70	13.50	20.20	21.85	37.85	59.70	51.90	46.85	470.30
6	Poland	Julia Wojciechowska	7.00	9.40	16.40	7.85	13.05	20.90	8.40	12.15	20.55	23.25	34.60	~~57.85~~	51.90	46.85	470.30
6	Poland	Stefania Krupa	8.20	12.45	20.65	7.70	11.25	18.95	5.60	11.75	17.35	21.50	35.45	~~56.95~~	51.90	46.85	470.30
6	Poland	Totals:	59.70	98.45	158.15	62.85	98.95	161.80	62.30	104.10	166.40	184.85	301.50	486.35	51.90	46.85	470.30
7	Italy	Ebore Canella	8.55	12.75	21.30	7.65	11.20	18.85	9.25	12.35	21.60	25.45	36.30	61.75	51.25	41.40	442.05
7	Italy	Clara Bimbocci	7.15	12.15	19.30	7.60	11.75	19.35	7.95	13.15	21.10	22.70	37.05	59.75	51.25	41.40	442.05
7	Italy	Elda Cividino	6.60	12.50	19.10	7.90	10.45	18.35	9.55	12.75	22.30	24.05	35.70	59.75	51.25	41.40	442.05
7	Italy	Carmela Toso	7.50	13.05	20.55	7.90	10.40	18.30	6.85	11.90	18.75	7.50	13.05	57.60	51.25	41.40	442.05
7	Italy	Pina Cipriotto	7.85	11.05	18.90	6.90	10.15	17.05	8.20	11.20	19.40	22.95	32.40	55.35	51.25	41.40	442.05
7	Italy	Anna Avanzini	6.60	10.95	18.85	7.05	10.45	17.50	8.10	10.75	18.85	23.05	32.15	55.20	51.25	41.40	442.05
7	Italy	Vittoria Avanzini	7.25	10.75	18.00	7.45	10.50	17.95	8.95	9.85	18.80	23.65	31.10	~~54.75~~	51.25	41.40	442.05
7	Italy	Gianna Guaita	6.60	10.95	17.55	7.15	7.25	14.40	7.80	11.65	19.45	21.55	29.85	~~51.40~~	51.25	41.40	442.05
7	Italy	Totals:	59.40	94.15	153.55	59.60	82.15	141.75	66.65	93.60	160.25	185.65	269.90	455.55	51.25	41.40	442.05
8	Great Britain	Mary Heaton	6.75	12.40	19.15	7.50	13.25	20.75	7.90	8.35	16.25	22.15	34.00	56.15	52.00	43.00	408.30
8	Great Britain	Mary Kelly	7.30	11.15	18.45	7.65	9.85	17.50	7.90	9.85	17.75	22.85	30.85	53.70	52.00	43.00	408.30
8	Great Britain	Lilian Ridgewell	7.10	12.20	19.30	7.55	10.25	17.80	6.25	9.65	15.90	20.90	32.10	53.00	52.00	43.00	408.30
8	Great Britain	Doris Blake	6.05	12.35	18.40	7.35	11.05	18.40	6.40	9.25	15.65	19.80	32.65	52.45	52.00	43.00	408.30
8	Great Britain	Brenda Crowe	6.75	11.65	18.40	6.25	11.05	17.30	4.00	9.30	13.30	17.00	32.00	49.00	52.00	43.00	408.30
8	Great Britain	Clarice Hanson	6.50	12.70	19.20	6.50	10.65	17.15	2.65	10.00	12.65	15.65	33.35	49.00	52.00	43.00	408.30
8	Great Britain	Marion Wharton	7.90	11.40	19.30	6.55	11.25	17.80	6.60	3.25	9.85	21.05	25.90	~~46.95~~	52.00	43.00	408.30
8	Great Britain	Edna Gross	7.25	10.95	18.20	5.55	9.65	15.20	0.79	9.65	10.44	13.59	30.25	~~43.84~~	52.00	43.00	408.30
8	Great Britain	Totals:	55.60	94.80	150.40	54.90	87.00	141.90	42.49	69.30	111.79	152.99	251.40	404.09	52.00	43.00	408.30
