= Italian Artistic Gymnastics Championships =

Highest-level individual national competition

The Italian Artistic Gymnastics Championships (Italian: Campionati italiani assoluti di ginnastica artistica) are the highest-level individual competition in artistic gymnastics in Italy. The first edition was held in 1925.

The championships are organized by the Italian Gymnastics Federation (FGI) and include men's and women's competitions in standard gymnastics disciplines.

The championships are called "assoluti" ("absolute") in the sense that all gymnasts, with no distinction between juniors and seniors, can compete in them. The winner claims the title of "Champion of Italy".

== History ==
In 1977, the sports club Ginnastica Romana proposed combining the male and female championships, for the first time in Italy, alternating men's events with women's ones.

== Winners ==
Men's individual all-around
| Year | Winner | Club |
|---|---|---|
| 1925 | Vittorio Lucchetti | S.G.Colombo Genova |
| 1926 | Vittorio Lucchetti | S.G.Colombo Genova |
| 1927 | Giuseppe Paris | S.G. Forza e Coraggio Milano |
| 1928 | Romeo Neri | G.S. Lancia Torino |
| 1929 | Romeo Neri | U.S. Forti e Liberi Ravenna |
| 1930 | Romeo Neri | U.S. Forti e Liberi Ravenna |
| 1931 | Mario Lertora | S.G.Colombo Genova |
| 1932 | Mario Morandi | S.G. Panaro Modena |
| 1933 | Romeo Neri | S.G. Libertas Rimini |
| 1934 | Natale Amedeo | U.S. Alessandria Alessandria |
| 1935 | Savino Guglielmetti | Ginnastica ProPatria |
| 1936 | Danilo Fioravanti | Ginnastica ProPatria |
| 1937 | Savino Guglielmetti | Ginnastica ProPatria |
| 1938 | Savino Guglielmetti | Ginnastica ProPatria |
| 1939 | Savino Guglielmetti | Ginnastica ProPatria |
| 1940 | Savino Guglielmetti | Ginnastica ProPatria |
| 1941 | Natale Amedeo | Ginnastica Fratellanza |
| 1942 | Natale Amedeo | Ginnastica Fratellanza |
| 1945 | Ettore Perego | Ginnastica ProLissone |
| 1946 | Danilo Fioravanti | G.S. Vigili del Fuoco 52° (MI) |
| 1947 | Ettore Perego | Ginnastica ProLissone |
| 1948 | Guido Figone | S.G. Pro Chiavari Chiavari |
| 1949 | Guido Figone | S.G. Pro Chiavari Chiavari |
| 1950 | Guido Figone | S.G. Pro Chiavari Chiavari |
| 1951 | Guido Figone | S.G. Pro Chiavari Chiavari |
| 1952 | Guido Figone | S.G. Pro Chiavari Chiavari |
| 1953 | Guido Figone | S.G. Pro Chiavari Chiavari |
| 1954 | Guido Figone | S.G. Pro Chiavari Chiavari |
| 1955 | Guido Figone | S.G. Pro Chiavari Chiavari |
| 1956 | Orlando Polmonari | Palestra Ginnastica Ferrara |
| 1957 | Arrigo Carnoli | S.S. Edera Ravenna |
| 1958 | Pasquale Carminucci | S.D. Adrianova S. Ben. Tronto |
| 1959 | Angelo Vicardi | G.S. Vigili del Fuoco Galimberti (MI) |
| 1960 | Franco Menichelli | Ginnastica Romana |
| 1961 | Giovanni Carminucci | G.S. Vigili del Fuoco Brunetti (Roma) |
| 1962 | Franco Menichelli | Ginnastica Romana |
| 1963 | Franco Menichelli | Ginnastica Romana |
| 1964 | Franco Menichelli | Ginnastica Romana |
| 1965 | Franco Menichelli | Ginnastica Romana |
| 1966 | Franco Menichelli | Ginnastica Romana |
| 1967 | Giovanni Carminucci | G.S. Vigili del Fuoco Brunetti (Roma) |
| 1968 | Giovanni Carminucci | G.S. Vigili del Fuoco Brunetti (Roma) |
| 1969 | Aquilino Santoro | G.S. Vigili del Fuoco Brunetti (Roma) |
| 1970 | Giovanni Carminucci | G.S. Vigili del Fuoco Brunetti (Roma) |
| 1971 | Maurizio Montesi | U.S. Forti e Liberi Forlì |
| 1972 | Maurizio Milanetto | Ginnastica Ardor Padova |
| 1973 | Maurizio Montesi | G.S. Vigili del Fuoco Brunetti (Roma) |
| 1974 | Maurizio Milanetto | Ginnastica Ardor Padova |
| 1975 | Maurizio Milanetto | Ginnastica Ardor Padova |
| 1976 | Angelo Zucca | G.S. Vigili del Fuoco Brunetti (Roma) |
| 1977 | Angelo Zucca | Amsicora Cagliari |
| 1978 | Angelo Zucca | Amsicora Cagliari |
| 1979 | Rocco Amboni | S.G. Bergamo |
| 1980 | Rocco Amboni | G.S. Vigili del Fuoco Brunetti (Roma) |
| 1981 | Corrado Colombo | Libertas Novara |
| 1982 | Diego Lazzarich | Spes Mestre |
| 1982 | Vittorio Allievi | Ginnastica Meda |
| 1983 | Diego Lazzarich | Spes Mestre |
| 1984 | Vittorio Allievi | G.S. Vigili del Fuoco Galimberti (MI) |
| 1985 | Vittorio Allievi | G.S. Vigili del Fuoco Galimberti (MI) |
| 1986 | Antonio Trecate | Virtus Gallarate |
| 1987 | Boris Preti | Virtus Gallarate |
| 1988 | Boris Preti | Virtus Gallarate |
| 1989 | Jury Chechi | Ginnastica Etruria |
| 1990 | Jury Chechi | Ginnastica Etruria |
| 1991 | Jury Chechi | Ginnastica Etruria |
| 1992 | Jury Chechi | Ginnastica Etruria |
| 1993 | Jury Chechi | Ginnastica Etruria |
| 1994 | Boris Preti | Virtus Gallarate |
| 1995 | Jury Chechi | Ginnastica Etruria |
| 1996 | Robero Galli | Virtus Gallarate |
| 1997 | Bruno Malaspina | Nardi Juventus |
| 1998 | Robero Galli | Virtus Gallarate |
| 1999 | Robero Galli | Virtus Gallarate |
| 2000 | Igor Cassina | Ginnastica Meda |
| 2001 | Matteo Morandi | Casati Arcore |
| 2002 | Matteo Morandi | Casati Arcore |
| 2003 | Enrico Pozzo | Libertas Vercelli |
| 2004 | Enrico Pozzo | Libertas Vercelli |
| 2005 | Enrico Pozzo | Libertas Vercelli |
| 2006 | Matteo Morandi | Casati Arcore |
| 2007 | Enrico Pozzo | Libertas Vercelli |
| 2008 | Matteo Morandi | Casati Arcore |
| 2009 | Matteo Morandi | C.S. Aeronautica Militare |
| 2010 | Paolo Ottavi | C.S. Aeronautica Militare |
| 2011 | Enrico Pozzo | C.S. Aeronautica Militare |
| 2012 | Enrico Pozzo | C.S. Aeronautica Militare |
| 2013 | Ludovico Edalli | Pro Patria Bustese |
| 2014 | Paolo Principi | Aeronautica Militare |
| 2015 | Ludovico Edalli | Aeronautica Militare |
| 2016 | Enrico Pozzo | Aeronautica Militare |
| 2017 | Marco Sarrugerio | Juventus Nova |
| 2018 | Ludovico Edalli | Aeronautica Militare |
| 2019 | Ludovico Edalli | Aeronautica Militare |
| 2020 | Ludovico Edalli | Aeronautica Militare |
| 2021 | Nicola Bartolini | Pro Patria Bustese |
| 2022 | Yumin Abbadini | Pro Carate |
| 2023 | Mario Macchiati | Ginnastica Fermo |
| 2024 | Lorenzo Minh Casali | Fiamme Oro |
| 2025 | Manrique Larduet | Ginnastica Civitavecchia |
| 2026 | Manrique Larduet | Ginnastica Civitavecchia |

Women's individual all-around
| Year | Winner | Club |
|---|---|---|
| 1937 | Ebore Canella | Ginnastica Sestriponente |
| 1938 | Paola Morgari | Ginnastica Torino |
| 1939 | Clara Bimbocci | Busto Arsizio |
| 1940 | Elda Cividino | Ginnastica Triestina |
| 1941 | Anna Maria Gelbini | Ginnastica Etruria |
| 1942 | Anna Maria Gelbini | Ginnastica Etruria |
| 1943 | Anna Maria Gelbini | Ginnastica Etruria |
| 1946 | Anna Maria Gelbini | Ginnastica Etruria |
| 1947 | Laura Micheli | Ginnastica Triestina |
| 1948 | Laura Micheli | Ginnastica Triestina |
| 1949 | Laura Micheli | Ginnastica Triestina |
| 1950 | Licia Macchini | Ginnastica Fanfulla |
| 1951 | Liliana Scaricabarozzi | Ginnastica Fanfulla |
| 1952 | Lidia Pitteri | S.G. Reyer Venezia |
| 1953 | Lidia Pitteri | S.G. Reyer Venezia |
| 1954 | Liliana Scaricabarozzi | Ginnastica Fanfulla |
| 1955 | Elisa Celsi | Ginnastica Fanfulla |
| 1956 | Miranda Cicognani | Ginnastica Edera Forlì |
| 1957 | Miranda Cicognani | Ginnastica Edera Forlì |
| 1958 | Miranda Cicognani | Ginnastica Edera Forlì |
| 1959 | Rosella Cicognani | Ginnastica Edera Forlì |
| 1960 | Miranda Cicognani | Ginnastica Edera Forlì |
| 1961 | Rosella Cicognani | Ginnastica Edera Forlì |
| 1962 | Miranda Cicognani | Ginnastica Edera Forlì |
| 1963 | Adriana Biagiotti | Ginnastica Etruria |
| 1964 | Gabriella Pozzuolo | Ginnastica Andrea Doria |
| 1965 | Adriana Biagiotti | Ginnastica Etruria |
| 1966 | Adriana Biagiotti | Ginnastica Etruria |
| 1967 | Adriana Biagiotti | Ginnastica Etruria |
| 1968 | Angela Alberti | S.G. Cantoni Legnano |
| 1969 | Angela Alberti | S.G. Cantoni Legnano |
| 1970 | Desy Storai | Ginnastica Etruria |
| 1971 | Angela Alberti | S.G. Cantoni Legnano |
| 1972 | Monica Stefani | S.G. Cucirini Cantoni Lucca |
| 1973 | Gabriella Marchi | S.G. Romeo Neri Rimini |
| 1974 | Serenella Codato | S.G. Reyer Venezia |
| 1975 | Stefania Bucci | Ginnastica Aurora |
| 1976 | Elisabetta Masi | S.G. Spes Mestre |
| 1977 | Monica Valentini | Ginnastica SEF |
| 1978 | Monica Valentini | Ginnastica SEF |
| 1979 | Laura Bortolaso | Ginnastica Umberto I |
| 1980 | Laura Bortolaso | Ginnastica Umberto I |
| 1981 | Laura Bortolaso | Ginnastica Umberto I |
| 1982 | Laura Bortolaso | Ginnastica Umberto I |
| 1983 | Laura Bortolaso | Ginnastica Umberto I |
| 1984 | Laura Bortolaso | Ginnastica Umberto I |
| 1985 | Giulia Volpi | Ginnastica Genova |
| 1986 | Ghiselli Elena | Libertas Novara |
| 1987 | Giulia Volpi | Ginnastica Genova |
| 1988 | Giulia Volpi | Ginnastica Genova |
| 1989 | Roberta Kirchmayer | Ginnastica Triestina |
| 1990 | Roberta Kirchmayer | Ginnastica Triestina |
| 1991 | Giulia Volpi | Ginnastica GAL |
| 1992 | Giulia Volpi | Ginnastica GAL |
| 1993 | Veronica Servente | Ginnastica Torino |
| 1994 | Marianna Crisci | Pro Novara |
| 1995 | Elisa Lamperti | Ginnastica JuventusNova |
| 1996 | Adriana Crisci | Pro Novara |
| 1997 | Martina Bremini | Ginnastica Artistica 81 |
| 1998 | Elena Olivetti | La Fenice Roma |
| 1999 | Martina Bremini | Ginnastica Artistica 81 |
| 2000 | Adriana Crisci | Pro Novara |
| 2001 | Ilaria Colombo | Ginnastica GAL |
| 2002 | Maria Teresa Gargano | Ginnastica Flaminio |
| 2003 | Maria Teresa Gargano | Ginnastica Flaminio |
| 2004 | Monica Bergamelli | Ginnastica Brixia |
| 2005 | Vanessa Ferrari | Ginnastica Brixia |
| 2006 | Vanessa Ferrari | Ginnastica Brixia |
| 2007 | Vanessa Ferrari | Ginnastica Brixia |
| 2008 | Lia Parolari | Ginnastica Estate 83 |
| 2009 | Vanessa Ferrari | Ginnastica Brixia |
| 2010 | Elisabetta Preziosa | Ginnastica GAL |
| 2011 | Vanessa Ferrari | C.S. Esercito |
| 2012 | Vanessa Ferrari | C.S. Esercito |
| 2013 | Tea Ugrin | Ginnastica Artistica 81 |
| 2014 | Elisa Meneghini | Ginnastica GAL |
| 2015 | Tea Ugrin | Ginnastica Artistica 81 |
| 2016 | Vanessa Ferrari | C.S. Esercito |
| 2017 | Elisa Iorio | Ginnastica Brixia |
| 2018 | Giorgia Villa | Ginnastica Brixia |
| 2019 | Asia D'Amato | Ginnastica Brixia |
| 2020 | Asia D'Amato Giorgia Villa | Fiamme Oro |
| 2021 | Giorgia Villa | Fiamme Oro |
| 2022 | Martina Maggio | Fiamme Oro |
| 2023 | Alice D'Amato | Fiamme Oro |
| 2024 | Alice D'Amato | Fiamme Oro |
| 2025 | Giulia Perotti | Libertas Vercelli |
| 2026 | July Marano | Ginnastica Civitavecchia |
