= Gymnastics at the 1996 Summer Olympics – Men's artistic individual all-around =

Olympic gymnastics event

Men's artistic individual all-around at the Games of the XXVI Olympiad
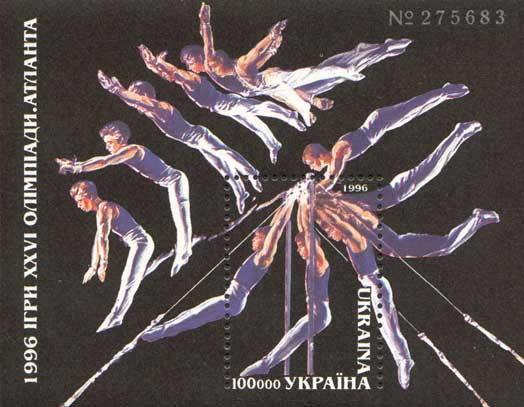
- Ukraine stamp commemorating gymnastics at the 1996 Summer Olympics
- Venue: Georgia Dome
- Dates: 20–24 July 1996
- Competitors: 111 from 31 nations
- Winning score: 58.423

Medalists
1st place, gold medalist(s)		Li Xiaoshuang; China
2nd place, silver medalist(s)		Alexei Nemov; Russia
3rd place, bronze medalist(s)		Vitaly Scherbo; Belarus

The men's individual all-around competition was one of eight events for male competitors in artistic gymnastics at the 1996 Summer Olympics in Atlanta. The qualification and final rounds took place on July 20, 22 and 24th at the Georgia Dome. There were 111 competitors from 31 nations. Each nation could enter a team of 7 gymnasts (up from 6 in previous Games) or up to 3 individual gymnasts. The event was won by Li Xiaoshuang of China, the nation's first victory in the event and first medal of any color since 1984. Two nations making their debut as independent nations after the dissolution of the Soviet Union took silver (Alexei Nemov of Russia) and bronze (Vitaly Scherbo of Belarus). Scherbo had won the event as a member of the Unified Team in 1992; he was the 11th man to earn multiple all-around medals.

== Background ==
This was the 22nd appearance of the men's individual all-around. The first individual all-around competition had been held in 1900, after the 1896 competitions featured only individual apparatus events. A men's individual all-around has been held every Games since 1900.

Seven of the top 10 gymnasts from the 1992 Games returned: gold medalist Vitaly Scherbo of the Unified Team (now representing Belarus), bronze medalist Valery Belenky of the Unified Team (now competing for Germany), fourth-place finisher Andreas Wecker of Germany, fifth-place finisher Li Xiaoshuang of China, eighth-place finisher Lee Joo-Hyung of South Korea, and ninth-place finishers Han Yun-su of South Korea and Szilveszter Csollány of Hungary. Li was the reigning (1995) World Champion; Scherbo had won in 1993, taken third in 1994, and finished second behind Li in 1995. Li recognized Alexei Nemov of Russia (relatively unknown in all-around but with strong results in each apparatus at the 1996 World Championships, which had no all-around event) as a bigger contender in Atlanta than Scherbo, however.

Armenia, Barbados, Belarus, Croatia, the Czech Republic, Georgia, Greece, Iceland, Ireland, Kazakhstan, Russia, and Ukraine each made their debut in the event. France made its 20th appearance, most among nations.

== Competition format ==
The 1996 competition followed the revised format from 1992, which ended the carryover of preliminary scores to the final. The preliminary round and final round were separate. In the preliminary round (which also served as the team all-around competition as well as the qualifying round for the individual apparatus events), each gymnast performed a compulsory exercise and an optional exercise on each apparatus. (Many gymnasts from nations competing in the team event opted not to compete on each apparatus, as the team event required designating only 6 of the 7 as team competitors on each apparatus, reducing the incentive for specialists on one apparatus to compete on all others.) The scores for all 12 exercises were summed to give an individual all-around preliminary score. The top 36 gymnasts advanced to the individual all-around final—except that each nation was limited to 3 finalists. There, each of the finalists performed another exercise on each apparatus. The sum of these six exercise scores resulted in a final total. Each exercise was scored from 0 to 10; thus, the preliminary apparatus scores ranged from 0 to 20 each and the total preliminary score from 0 to 120. The final total, with six exercises, was from 0 to 60.

== Schedule ==
All times are Eastern Daylight Time (UTC-4)

Date	Time	Round
Saturday, 20 July 1996	18:21	Preliminary: Compulsory
Monday, 22 July 1996	18:31	Preliminary: Voluntary
Wednesday, 24 July 1996	16:26	Final

== Results ==
All 111 gymnasts were ranked by their totals in the preliminary round, though only 74 completed all 12 exercises during the all-around during the compulsory and optional rounds on July 20 and 22. The 36 highest scoring gymnasts advanced to the final on July 24. Each country was limited to three competitors in the final.

Rank	Gymnast	Nation	Prelim	Floor	Pommel horse	Rings	Vault	Parallel bars	Horizontal bar	Total
1st place, gold medalist(s)	Li Xiaoshuang	China	114.786	9.687	9.712	9.775	9.812	9.650	9.787	58.423
2nd place, silver medalist(s)	Alexei Nemov	Russia	116.361	9.700	9.800	9.612	9.700	9.762	9.800	58.374
3rd place, bronze medalist(s)	Vitaly Scherbo	Belarus	115.210	9.762	9.662	9.587	9.687	9.712	9.787	58.197
4	Zhang Jinjing	China	114.596	9.637	9.750	9.562	9.650	9.762	9.787	58.148
5	Shen Jian	China	114.223	9.537	9.650	9.637	9.662	9.700	9.675	57.861
6	Valeri Belenki	Germany	113.910	9.612	9.762	9.612	9.600	9.625	9.637	57.848
7	John Roethlisberger	United States	114.886	9.675	9.662	9.650	9.575	9.475	9.725	57.762
8	Rustam Sharipov	Ukraine	114.372	9.625	9.637	9.650	9.400	9.750	9.650	57.712
9	Oleksandr Svitlychniy	Ukraine	113.886	9.650	9.587	9.662	9.537	9.625	9.637	57.698
10	Blaine Wilson	United States	114.337	9.600	9.637	9.737	9.600	9.450	9.662	57.686
11	Cristian Leric	Romania	112.186	9.625	9.562	9.412	9.700	9.600	9.675	57.574
12	Naoya Tsukahara	Japan	114.147	9.612	9.612	9.650	9.512	9.625	9.550	57.561
13	Andreas Wecker	Germany	114.474	9.600	9.025	9.750	9.662	9.600	9.775	57.412
13	Jesus Carballo	Spain	111.761	9.400	9.675	9.512	9.450	9.625	9.750	57.412
15	Yoshiaki Hatakeda	Japan	113.174	9.425	9.637	9.487	9.350	9.612	9.700	57.211
15	Igor Korobchinski	Ukraine	113.473	9.450	9.625	9.462	9.512	9.675	9.487	57.211
17	Yordan Yovchev	Bulgaria	114.898	9.650	9.600	9.737	9.375	9.050	9.712	57.124
17	Jury Chechi	Italy	112.186	9.450	9.587	9.800	9.050	9.550	9.687	57.124
19	Hikaru Tanaka	Japan	113.649	9.562	9.450	9.637	9.425	9.550	9.375	56.999
20	Lee Joo-Hyung	South Korea	114.647	9.375	9.612	9.712	9.637	9.600	9.050	56.986
21	Krasimir Dounev	Bulgaria	113.898	9.125	9.500	9.575	9.587	9.475	9.712	56.974
22	Zoltán Supola	Hungary	113.498	8.875	9.712	9.575	9.525	9.550	9.725	56.962
23	Jan-Peter Nikiferow	Germany	113.198	9.587	9.450	9.575	9.400	9.437	9.375	56.824
24	Alexei Voropaev	Russia	115.136	9.687	8.400	9.737	9.662	9.625	9.712	56.823
25	Ilia Giorgadze	Georgia	111.199	9.525	9.512	9.325	9.375	9.450	9.612	56.799
26	Sébastien Tayac	France	113.086	9.562	9.512	9.425	9.525	9.200	9.475	56.699
27	Boris Preti	Italy	112.761	9.350	9.350	9.512	9.250	9.512	9.687	56.661
28	Roberto Galli	Italy	112.336	9.625	8.950	9.562	9.350	9.425	9.537	56.449
29	John Macready	United States	112.374	8.525	9.537	9.537	9.562	9.487	9.562	56.210
30	Andrey Kan	Belarus	114.361	9.600	9.675	9.562	9.525	8.600	9.000	55.962
30	Vitaly Rudnitsky	Belarus	112.625	9.675	9.700	9.600	9.512	9.350	8.125	55.962
32	Dimitar Lunchev	Bulgaria	112.162	9.200	9.662	9.275	9.300	9.462	9.000	55.899
33	Frédérick Nicolas	France	111.500	9.350	8.750	9.500	9.225	9.500	9.537	55.862
34	Hann Yoon-Soo	South Korea	113.499	9.300	9.737	9.512	9.300	9.612	8.375	55.836
35	Brennon Dowrick	Australia	110.500	9.200	9.600	9.400	0.000	9.250	9.450	46.900
36	Volodymyr Shamenko	Ukraine	113.486	DNS						
37	Patrice Casimir	France	113.424	Did not advance—3 per nation rule						
38	Adrian Ianculescu	Romania	113.136	Did not advance—3 per nation rule						
39	Nicu Stroia	Romania	112.874	Did not advance—3 per nation rule						
40	Toshiharu Sato	Japan	112.787	Did not advance—3 per nation rule						
41	Oliver Walther	Germany	112.562	Did not advance—3 per nation rule						
42	Kalofer Khristozov	Bulgaria	111.300	Did not advance—3 per nation rule						
43	Nistor Șandro	Romania	111.062	Did not advance—3 per nation rule						
44	Aleksey Dmitriyenko	Kazakhstan	110.650	Did not advance—3 per nation rule						
45	Shigeru Kurihara	Japan	110.512	Did not advance—3 per nation rule						
46	Sergey Fedorchenko	Kazakhstan	110.475	Did not advance						
47	Deyan Yordanov	Bulgaria	110.387	Did not advance						
48	Donghua Li	Switzerland	110.212	Did not advance						
48	Szilveszter Csollány	Hungary	110.212	Did not advance						
50	Norayr Sargsyan	Armenia	110.211	Did not advance						
51	Bret Hudson	Australia	110.162	Did not advance						
52	Ioannis Melissanidis	Greece	109.975	Did not advance						
53	Michael Engeler	Switzerland	109.687	Did not advance						
54	Takashi Uchiyama	Japan	109.600	Did not advance						
55	Lee McDermott	Great Britain	109.300	Did not advance						
56	Alan Nolet	Canada	109.100	Did not advance						
57	Aleksej Demjanov	Croatia	108.762	Did not advance						
58	Jiří Fiřt	Czech Republic	108.512	Did not advance						
59	Dominic Brindle	Great Britain	107.875	Did not advance						
60	Erich Wanner	Switzerland	106.449	Did not advance						
61	Flemming Solberg	Norway	105.900	Did not advance						
62	Krisztián Jordanov	Hungary	105.787	Did not advance						
63	Richard Ikeda	Canada	105.400	Did not advance						
64	Fan Bin	China	105.223	Did not advance						
65	Jair Lynch	United States	104.574	Did not advance						
66	Yevgeny Podgorny	Russia	104.423	Did not advance						
67	Diego Lizardi	Puerto Rico	104.412	Did not advance						
68	Rúnar Alexandersson	Iceland	104.337	Did not advance						
69	Kris Burley	Canada	104.300	Did not advance						
70	Marcelo Palacio	Argentina	104.025	Did not advance						
71	Huang Huadong	China	103.536	Did not advance						
72	Aleksandr Belanovsky	Belarus	103.512	Did not advance						
73	Shane de Freitas	Barbados	103.375	Did not advance						
74	Barry McDonald	Ireland	102.850	Did not advance						
75	Karsten Oelsch	Germany	100.461	Did not advance						
76	Kim Dong-hwa	South Korea	100.437	Did not advance						
77	Paolo Bucci	Italy	96.398	Did not advance						
78	Dmitri Vasilenko	Russia	95.423	Did not advance						
79	Jeong Jin-su	South Korea	95.086	Did not advance						
80	Kip Simons	United States	94.461	Did not advance						
81	Sergio Luini	Italy	93.537	Did not advance						
82	Yeo Hong-cheol	South Korea	93.486	Did not advance						
83	Oleh Kosiak	Ukraine	93.250	Did not advance						
84	Pae Gil-su	North Korea	92.737	Did not advance						
85	Frédéric Lemoine	France	92.287	Did not advance						
86	Jo Seong-min	South Korea	91.687	Did not advance						
87	Sergey Kharkov	Russia	86.648	Did not advance						
88	Nikolay Kryukov	Russia	86.336	Did not advance						
89	Ivan Ivanov	Bulgaria	86.147	Did not advance						
90	Huang Liping	China	85.837	Did not advance						
91	Dmitry Trush	Russia	85.449	Did not advance						
92	Aleksandr Shostak	Belarus	85.187	Did not advance						
93	Éric Poujade	France	84.836	Did not advance						
94	Sébastien Darrigade	France	84.162	Did not advance						
95	Chainey Umphrey	United States	84.112	Did not advance						
96	Ivan Pavlovsky	Belarus	83.086	Did not advance						
97	Marcello Barbieri	Italy	82.787	Did not advance						
98	Robert Tăciulet	Romania	82.575	Did not advance						
99	Marius Urzică	Romania	76.099	Did not advance						
100	Yuriy Yermakov	Ukraine	75.612	Did not advance						
101	Uwe Billerbeck	Germany	75.399	Did not advance						
102	Thiérry Aymes	France	75.361	Did not advance						
103	Aleksey Sinkevich	Belarus	66.400	Did not advance						
104	Dan Burincă	Romania	65.800	Did not advance						
105	Kim Bong-hyeon	South Korea	63.937	Did not advance						
106	Hryhoriy Misiutin	Ukraine	57.812	Did not advance						
107	Francesco Colombo	Italy	56.287	Did not advance						
108	Mihai Bagiu	United States	55.861	Did not advance						
109	Fan Hongbin	China	48.124	Did not advance						
110	Marius Tobă	Germany	45.100	Did not advance						
111	Vasil Vetsev	Bulgaria	28.200	Did not advance						
