= Avanzini =

Avanzini is a surname. Notable people with the surname include:

- Anna Avanzini (1917–2011), Italian gymnast
- Bartolomeo Avanzini (1608–1658), Italian architect
- Daniela Avanzini (born 2004), American dancer and singer
- Giuseppe Avanzini (1753–1827), Italian mathematician and prelate
- Michel Avanzini (born 1989), Swiss footballer
- Pietro Antonio Avanzini (1656–1733), Italian painter
- Sebastian Avanzini (born 1995), Italian footballer
- Vittoria Avanzini (1915–2001), Italian gymnast
