= Julia Wojciechowska =

Julia Wojciechowska may refer to:

- Julia Wojciechowska (gymnast, born 1915) (1915–1986), Polish gymnast
- Julia Wojciechowska (gymnast, born 2006), Polish rhythmic gymnast
