= Ludivine Furnon =

French gymnast (born 1980)

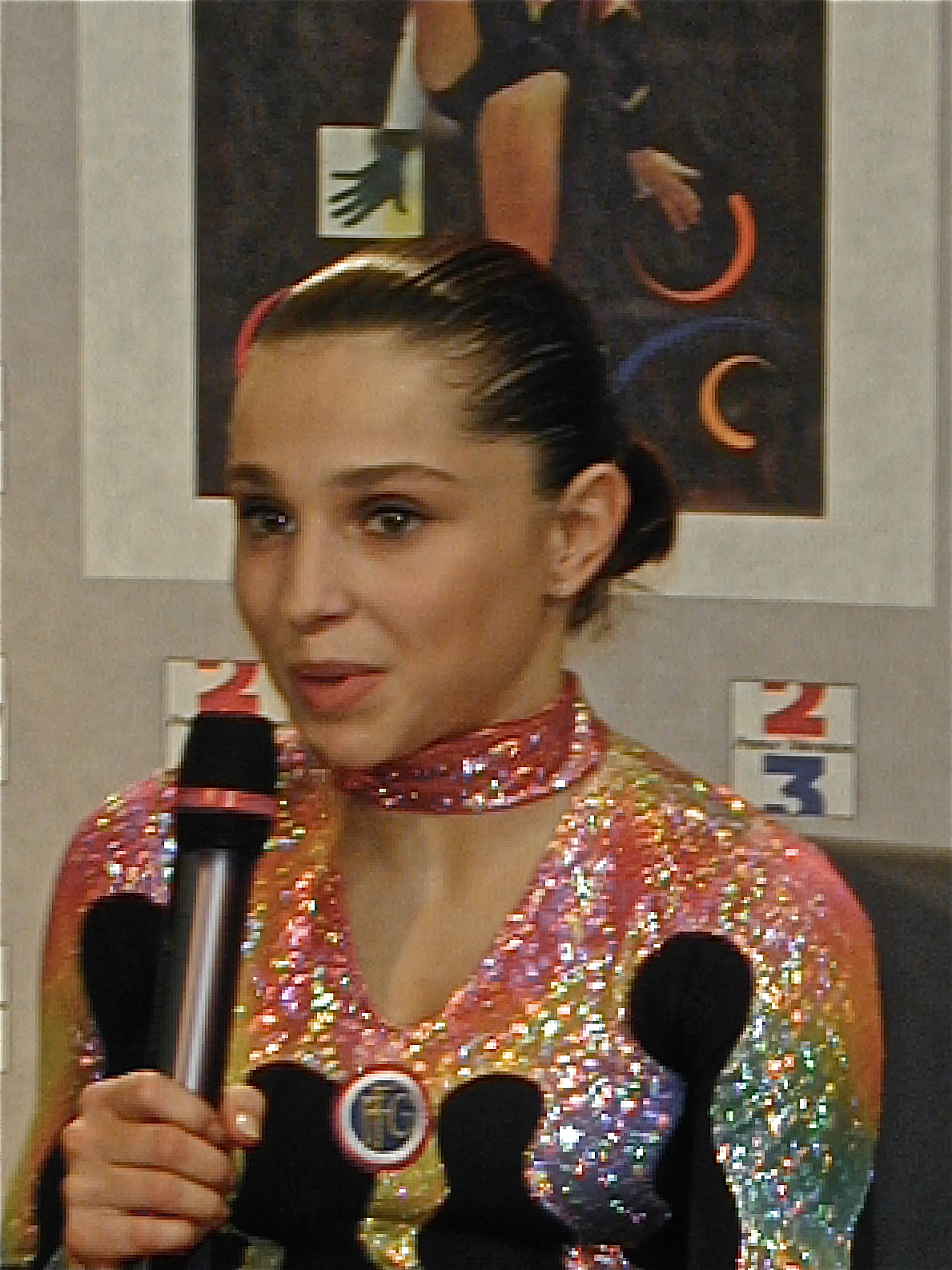
- During a media interview at the 2000 European Gymnastics Championships

Personal information
- Born: October 4, 1980 (age 46)

Gymnastics career
- Discipline: Women's artistic gymnastics
- Country represented: France
- Choreographer: Adriana Pop
Medal record
World Championships
Bronze medal – third place	1995 Sabae	Floor exercise
European Championships
Gold medal – first place	2000 Paris	Floor exercise
Mediterranean Games
Gold medal – first place	1997 Bari	Team
Gold medal – first place	1997 Bari	All-around
Gold medal – first place	1997 Bari	Floor exercise

Ludivine Furnon (born October 4, 1980 in Nîmes) is a retired Olympic athlete from France.

Although she attended dance classes from the age of eight, Furnon did not study gymnastics until April 1992, when she was eleven years old. Her rise in the sport was astonishingly rapid. In early 1994, less than two years after beginning gymnastics, she was accepted to train with the French national team in Marseille; by 1995 she was competing at the elite level. At her first French national championships, in 1995, she placed sixth in the all-around.

In 1995 Furnon also made her international debut, competing with the sixth-place French team at the World Gymnastics Championships in Sabae. With her innovative and expressive floor exercise routine, choreographed by coach Adriana Pop, she won a bronze medal in event finals, the first ever for a French gymnast at Worlds.

Furnon continued to be a major contributor to the French team for the next five years. In 1996, she became the French national champion and represented France at the 1996 Olympics, finishing nineteenth in the all-around. At the 1997 Mediterranean Games, Furnon won gold with the French team, as well as gold in the all-around and on floor exercise. She also competed at the 1996, 1997, 1999 and 2001 World Championships, qualifying for the floor finals on several occasions.

In 2000, Furnon seemed to be on the brink of success again, winning the floor exercise title at the 2000 European Championships over a tough field that included Elena Produnova, Simona Amânar and reigning world FX champion Andreea Răducan. However, at the 2000 Olympics a few months later, Furnon was dealing with injury issues, and was only able to compete on the uneven bars during the team portions of the meet.

In 2008, Furnon was part of the cast of Cirque du Soleil in the production Mystere in Las Vegas, Nevada.

Furnon has performed with her husband, Nicolas Besnard, in act named Duo MainTenanT since they both retired from Cirque du Soleil. Nicolas Besnard had his choreography recognized in the most prestigious Circus Festival in the world - Silver Medal in the 31st Festival Mondial du Cirque de Demain (France - 2010). In 2010, they appeared on France's Got Talent (La France a un Incroyable Talent) coming in 6th place overall.

In 2019, Furnon performed with her husband, Nicolas Besnard, on America’s Got Talent. All four judges said yes to them proceeding to the next round of the talent competition.
