= List of number-one hits of 1967 (Argentina) =

This is a list of the songs that reached number one in Argentina in 1967, according to Billboard magazine with data provided by Rubén Machado's "Escalera a la fama".

Issue date	Song	Artist(s)
January 7	"A Man and a Woman"	Eddie Barclay/Franck Pourcel
January 14	"Funeral del labrador"	Bárbara & Dick/Rosalía/Odete Lara
January 21	"Funeral del labrador"	Bárbara & Dick/Rosalía/Odete Lara
January 28	"Funeral del labrador"	Bárbara & Dick/Rosalía/Odete Lara
February 4	"Funeral del labrador"	Bárbara & Dick/Rosalía/Odete Lara
February 11	"La banda"	Chico Buarque/Juan Ramón/Los Garotos Las 4 Voces/Nara Leão/Tropical Combo
February 18	"La banda"	Chico Buarque/Juan Ramón/Los Garotos Las 4 Voces/Nara Leão/Tropical Combo
March 18	"La banda"	Chico Buarque/Juan Ramón/Los Garotos Las 4 Voces/Nara Leão/Tropical Combo
March 25	"La felicidad"	Palito Ortega
April 1	"La felicidad"	Palito Ortega
April 8	"Reach Out I'll Be There"	The Four Tops/Rita Pavone/Giles Pellegrin
April 29	"Ciao amore, ciao"	Luigi Tenco/Dalida/Vittorio Paltrneri/ Juan Ramón/Gianfranco Pagliaro/Gabriella Marchi
May 6	"Ciao amore, ciao"	Luigi Tenco/Dalida/Vittorio Paltrneri/ Juan Ramón/Gianfranco Pagliaro/Gabriella Marchi
May 13	"A namoradinha de um amigo meu"	Roberto Carlos
May 20	"A namoradinha de um amigo meu"	Roberto Carlos
May 27	"A namoradinha de um amigo meu"	Roberto Carlos/Ely Arcoverde/Freddy Tadeo
June 3	"Poco puedo darte"	Palito Ortega
June 10	"Hablemos del amor"	Raphael/Siro San Román
June 24	"Hablemos del amor"	Raphael/Siro San Román
July 1	"Hablemos del amor"	Raphael/Siro San Román
July 22	"Puppet on a String"	Sandie Shaw/Al Hirt/Caravelli/Bingo Reyna/ Violeta Rivas/Las 4 Voces/Susanita Ramos
July 29	"Puppet on a String"	Sandie Shaw/Al Hirt/Caravelli/Bingo Reyna/ Violeta Rivas/Las 4 Voces/Susanita Ramos
August 5	"Puppet on a String"	Sandie Shaw/Al Hirt/Caravelli/Bingo Reyna/ Violeta Rivas/Las 4 Voces/Susanita Ramos
August 12	"Puppet on a String"	Sandie Shaw/Al Hirt/Caravelli/Bingo Reyna/ Violeta Rivas/Las 4 Voces/Susanita Ramos
August 19	"Puppet on a String"	Sandie Shaw/Al Hirt/Caravelli/Bingo Reyna/ Violeta Rivas/Las 4 Voces/Susanita Ramos
August 26	"Puppet on a String"	Sandie Shaw/Al Hirt/Caravelli/Bingo Reyna/ Violeta Rivas/Las 4 Voces/Susanita Ramos
September 16	"Vamos a la cama"	Las ardillitas
September 23	"¿Qué pasará?"	Palito Ortega
October 7	"Trisagio del soltero"	Napoleón Puppy/Los Wawancó
October 14	"Trisagio del soltero"	Napoleón Puppy/Los Wawancó
October 21	"All You Need Is Love"	The Beatles
October 28	"All You Need Is Love"	The Beatles
November 4	"La cárcel de Sing Sing"	José Feliciano/Pepito Pérez
November 11	"La cárcel de Sing Sing"	José Feliciano/Pepito Pérez
November 18	"La cárcel de Sing Sing"	José Feliciano/Pepito Pérez
November 25	"La cárcel de Sing Sing"	José Feliciano/Pepito Pérez
December 2	"The World We Knew (Over and Over)"	Frank Sinatra/Paul Jordan/Nueva Generación
December 9	"Todo es mentira"	Palito Ortega
December 16	"Todo es mentira"	Palito Ortega

== See also ==
- 1967 in music
