= Artistic gymnastics at the 1997 Mediterranean Games =

Gymnastics at the 1997 Mediterranean Games
- Location: Bari, Italy

Men's and women's artistic gymnastics were contested at the 1997 Mediterranean Games.

== Medal summary ==
=== Men's artistic gymnastics ===
| Event | Gold | | Silver | | Bronze | |
|---|---|---|---|---|---|---|
| Team | (Italy) Italy; Francesco Colombo; Jury Chechi; Giovanni D'Innocenzo; Sergio Luini; Bruno Malaspina | 161.300 | (Spain) Spain; Jesús Carballo; Omar Cortés; Víctor Cano; Andreu Vivó; Ortzi Acosta | 159.900 | (France) France; Éric Casimir; Cédric Guille; Sébastien Darrigade; Dmitri Karbanenko; Sébastien Tayac | 159.250 |
| Individual all-around | Jesús Carballo (ESP) | 54.150 | Dmitri Karbanenko (FRA) | 53.600 | Sergio Luini (ITA) | 52.950 |
| Floor exercise | Georgios Ellissiadis (GRE) | 8.950 | Suat Çelen (TUR) | 8.900 | Cédric Guille (FRA) | 8.800 |
| Pommel horse | Éric Casimir (FRA) | 9.350 | Sid Ali Ferdjani (ALG) | 9.200 | Sébastien Tayac (FRA) | 9.150 |
| Rings | Jury Chechi (ITA) | 9.800 | Aleksej Demjanov (CRO) | 9.600 | Dimosthenis Tambakos (GRE) | 9.600 |
| Vault | Raouf Abdelraouf (EGY) | 9.225 | Dmitri Karbanenko (FRA) | 8.875 | Giovanni D'Innocenzo (ITA) | 8.850 |
| Parallel bars | Andreu Vivó (ESP) | 9.250 | Sébastien Darrigade (FRA) | 9.200 | Dmitri Karbanenko (FRA) | 9.100 |
| Horizontal bar | Jesús Carballo (ESP) | 9.550 | Éric Casimir (FRA) | 9.350 | Giovanni D'Innocenzo (ITA) | 9.050 |

=== Women's artistic gymnastics ===
| Event | Gold | | Silver | | Bronze | |
|---|---|---|---|---|---|---|
| Team | (France) France; Cécile Canqueteau; Ludivine Furnon; Laure Gély; Elvire Teza; Émilie Volle | 113.001 | (Italy) Italy; Martina Bremini; Adriana Crisci; Laura Montagnolo; Paola Rivi; Giordana Rocchi | 112.674 | (Spain) Spain; Elisabeth Valle; Diana Plaza; Beatriz Sanchez; Jennifer Montávez; Susana García | 108.186 |
| Individual all-around | Ludivine Furnon (FRA) | 38.312 | Adriana Crisci (ITA) | 38.275 | Elvire Teza (FRA) | 37.475 |
| Vault | Elisabeth Valle (ESP) | 9.512 | Martina Bremini (ITA) | 9.387 | Laura Montagnolo (ITA) | 9.262 |
| Uneven bars | Elvire Teza (FRA) | 9.850 | Adriana Crisci (ITA) | 9.750 | Martina Bremini (ITA) | 9.450 |
| Balance beam | Elvire Teza (FRA) | 9.725 | Vasiliki Tsavdaridou (GRE) | 9.600 | Adriana Crisci (ITA) | 9.600 |
| Floor exercise | Ludivine Furnon (FRA) | 9.775 | Vasiliki Tsavdaridou (GRE) | 9.700 | Adriana Crisci (ITA) | 9.675 |

== Medal table ==
* Host nation (Italy)

| Rank | Nation | Gold | Silver | Bronze | Total |
|---|---|---|---|---|---|
| 1 | France | 6 | 4 | 5 | 15 |
| 2 | Spain | 4 | 1 | 1 | 6 |
| 3 | Italy* | 2 | 4 | 7 | 13 |
| 4 | Greece | 1 | 2 | 1 | 4 |
| 5 | Egypt | 1 | 0 | 0 | 1 |
| 6 | Algeria | 0 | 1 | 0 | 1 |
| 6 | Croatia | 0 | 1 | 0 | 1 |
| 6 | Turkey | 0 | 1 | 0 | 1 |
| Totals (8 entries) | | 14 | 14 | 14 | 42 |
