= Éric Casimir =

French gymnast

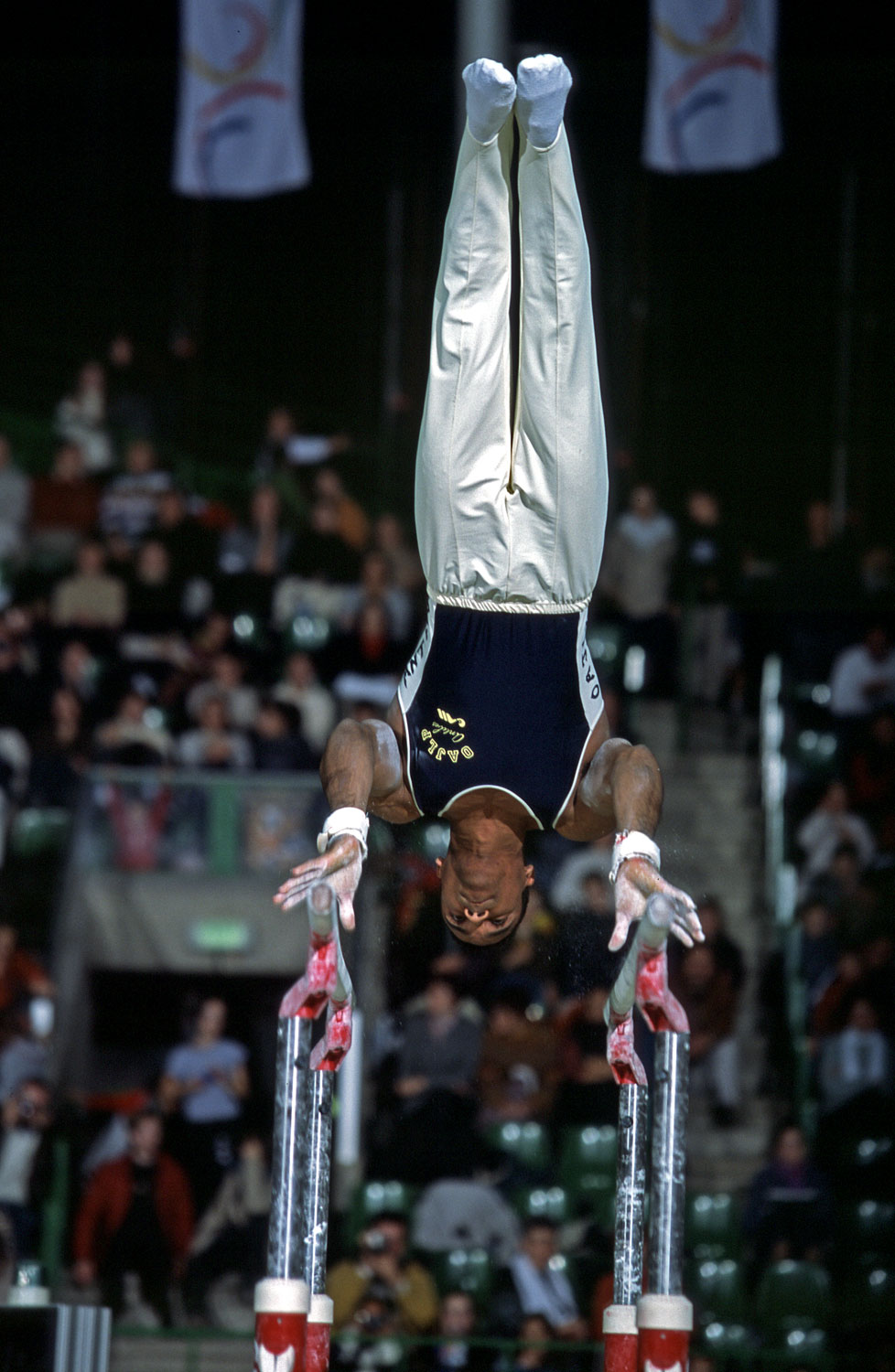
- Casimir in 2001

Personal information
- Born: 20 February 1977 (age 49) Le Port, Réunion
- Height: 175 cm (5 ft 9 in)
- Relatives: Patrice Casimir (brother)

Gymnastics career
- Discipline: Men's artistic gymnastics
- Country represented: France
Medal record
Representing France
European Championships
Gold medal – first place	1998 Saint Petersburg	Team
Mediterranean Games
Gold medal – first place	1997 Bari	Pommel horse
Silver medal – second place	1997 Bari	Horizontal bar
Bronze medal – third place	1997 Bari	Team

Éric Casimir (born 20 February 1977) is a French gymnast. He competed at the 2000 Summer Olympics.
