= Elisabeth Valle =

Spanish gymnast

Personal information
- Nationality: Spanish
- Born: 10 February 1978 (age 48) Barcelona, Spain

Sport
- Sport: Gymnastics
Medal record
Representing Spain
Mediterranean Games
Gold medal – first place	1997 Bari	Vault
Bronze medal – third place	1997 Bari	Team

Elisabeth Valle Romero (born 10 February 1978) is a Spanish gymnast. She competed at the 1996 Summer Olympics. She also won the gold medal on vault at the 1997 Mediterranean Games.
