= Angela Alberti =

Italian gymnast (born 1949)

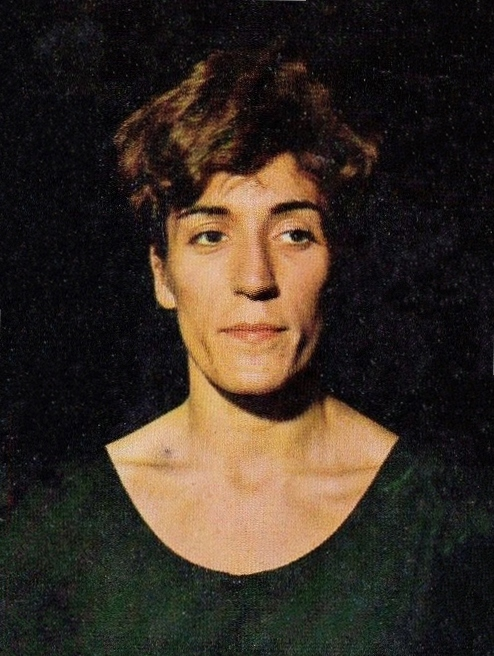

Personal information
- Born: 4 February 1949 (age 77) Covo, Italy
- Height: 1.63 m (5 ft 4 in)
- Weight: 55 kg (121 lb)

Sport
- Sport: Artistic gymnastics

Angela Alberti (born 4 February 1949) is a retired Italian gymnast. She competed at the 1972 Olympics and finished in 12th place with the Italian team. Her best individual result was 47th place on the balance beam. Alberti won four gold (team, all-around, parallel bars and vault) and two silver medals (balance beam and floor) at the 1971 Mediterranean Games.

== Biography ==
He won the overall individual competition three times at the Italian Artistic Gymnastics Championships, in 1968, 1969 and 1971.

He participated in the 1972 Summer Olympics in Munich finishing 83rd in the overall individual competition and, with the Italy women's national artistic gymnastics team, 12th in the team competition.

At the 2001 Mediterranean Games, she won the gold medal in the overall individual competition, on vault, on uneven bars and in the team competition, together with Gianna Bovani, Paola Fiammenghi, Gabriella Marchi, Rita Peri and Maria Desi Storai; in the same competition she won two silver medals, on beam and floor exercise.
