= Adelaide Meyer =

American gymnast

Personal information
- Born: June 4, 1906; Brooklyn, New York, United States
- Died: June 1, 1944 (aged 37); Brooklyn, New York, United States

Sport
- Sport: Gymnastics

Adelaide Meyer (June 4, 1906 – June 1, 1944) was an American gymnast. She competed in the women's artistic team all-around event at the 1936 Summer Olympics.
