= Patrizia Luconi =

Italian gymnast

Personal information
- Nationality: Italian
- Born: 24 October 1970 (age 54); Rimini, Italy

Sport
- Sport: Gymnastics

Patrizia Luconi (born 24 October 1970) is an Italian gymnast. She competed in five events at the 1988 Summer Olympics.

== Eponymous skill ==
Luconi has one eponymous skill listed in the Code of Points.

Apparatus	Name	Description	Difficulty (Note: Valid for the 2025-2028 Code of Points)
Vault	Luconi	Round-off flic-flac with ¾ turn (270°) on - tucked salto backward off	3.6
