= Mary Wright (gymnast) =

American gymnast

Personal information
- Nationality: American
- Born: July 30, 1908; San Antonio, Texas, United States
- Died: January 8, 1975 (aged 66)

Sport
- Sport: Gymnastics

Mary Wright (July 30, 1908 – January 8, 1975) was an American gymnast. She competed in the women's artistic team all-around event at the 1936 Summer Olympics.
