= Dušica Radivojević =

Yugoslav gymnast (1914–1994)

Personal information
- Nationality: Yugoslav
- Born: 25 January 1914
- Died: August 16, 1994 (aged 80)

Sport
- Sport: Gymnastics

Dušica Radivojević (25 January 1914 – 16 August 1994) was a Yugoslav gymnast. She competed in the women's artistic team all-around event at the 1936 Summer Olympics.
