= Francesco Colombo (gymnast) =

Italian gymnast

- Born: 22 June 1973 (age 53) Carate Brianza, Italy
- Height: 1.79 m (5 ft 10 in)

Gymnastics career
- Discipline: Men's artistic gymnastics
- Country represented: Italy
- Gym: Pro Carate Brianza
Medal record
Representing Italy
Mediterranean Games
Gold medal – first place	1997 Bari	Team

Francesco Colombo (born 22 June 1973) is an Italian gymnast. He competed at the 1996 Summer Olympics. He also won a gold medal with the Italian team at the 1997 Mediterranean Games.
