= Maja Veršeć =

Croatian gymnast

Personal information
- Nationality: Yugoslavian
- Born: 23 October 1916; Zagreb, Austria-Hungary

Sport
- Sport: Gymnastics

Maja Veršeć (born 23 October 1916, date of death unknown) was a Croatian-Yugoslavian gymnast. She competed in the women's artistic team all-around event at the 1936 Summer Olympics.
