= Renata Bianchi =

Italian gymnast

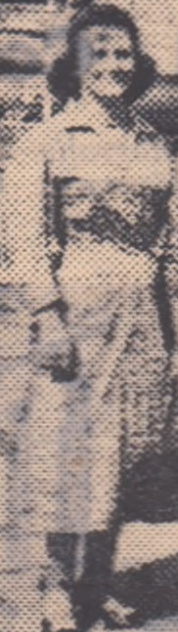

Personal information
- Nationality: Italian
- Born: 12 July 1926; Cornigliano, Italy
- Died: 7 February 1966 (aged 39)

Sport
- Sport: Gymnastics

Renata Bianchi (12 July 1926 – 7 February 1966) was an Italian gymnast. She competed at the 1948 Summer Olympics and the 1952 Summer Olympics.
