= Matylda Ossadnik =

Polish gymnast

Personal information
- Nationality: Polish
- Born: 17 March 1917; Bytom, Poland
- Died: 15 May 1997 (aged 80); Katowice, Poland

Sport
- Sport: Gymnastics

Matylda Ossadnik (17 March 1917 – 15 May 1997) was a Polish gymnast. She competed in the women's artistic team all-around event at the 1936 Summer Olympics.
