= Marion Wharton =

British gymnast (1908–1993)

Personal information
- Nationality: British
- Born: 16 July 1908; Keighley, England
- Died: February 1993; Bradford, England

Sport
- Sport: Gymnastics

Marion Wharton (16 July 1908 – February 1993) was a British gymnast. She competed in the women's artistic team all-around event at the 1936 Summer Olympics.
