= Sébastien Darrigade =

French gymnast

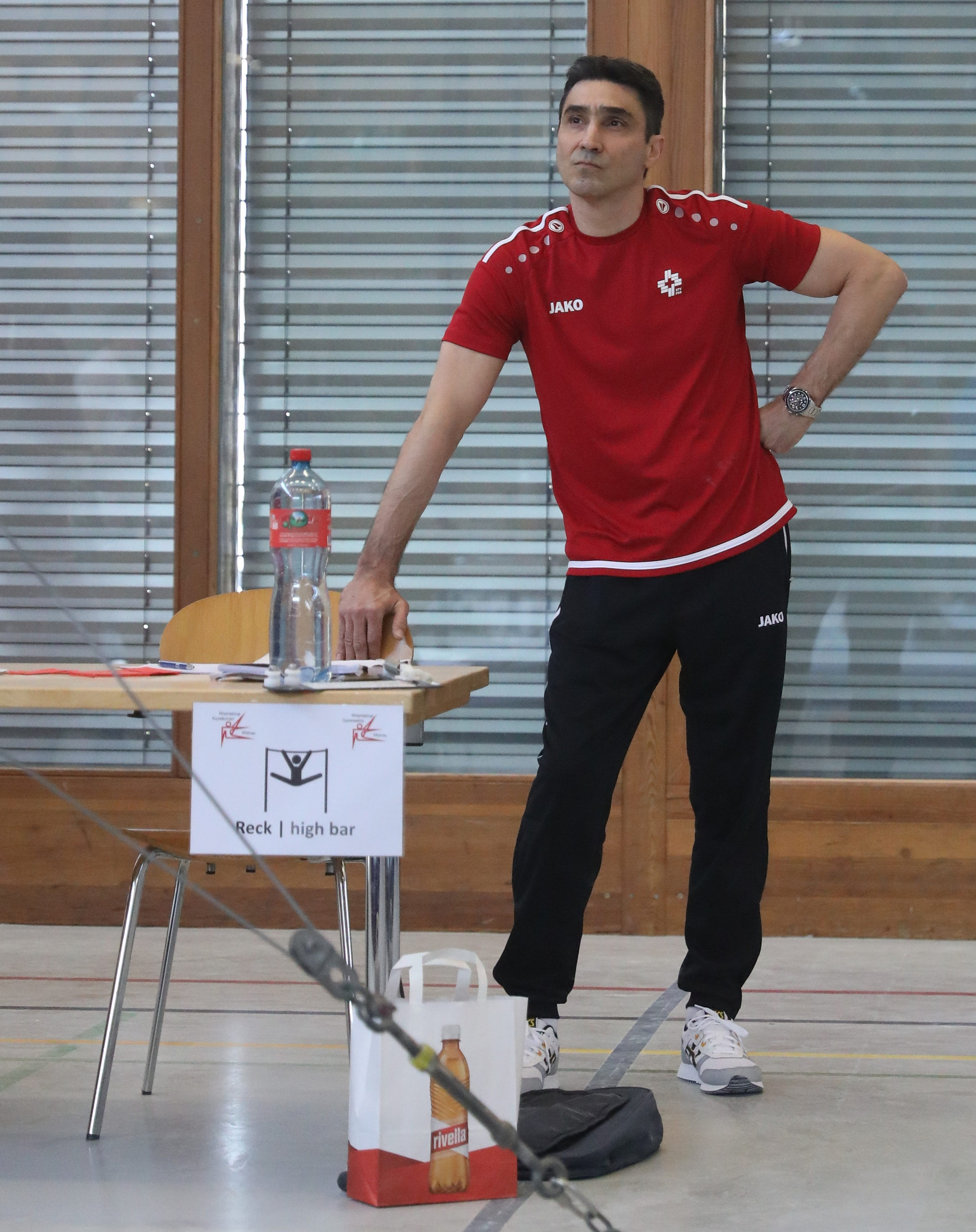
- Darrigade in 2022

Personal information
- Born: 20 March 1972 (age 54) Saint-Mandé, France
- Height: 1.76 m (5 ft 9 in)

Gymnastics career
- Discipline: Men's artistic gymnastics
- Country represented: France
- Club: CSMG Epinay
Medal record
Representing France
Mediterranean Games
Silver medal – second place	1997 Bari	Parallel bars
Bronze medal – third place	1997 Bari	Team

Sébastien Darrigade (born 20 March 1972) is a French gymnast. He competed at the 1992 Summer Olympics and the 1996 Summer Olympics. He now coaches the Swiss national men's gymnastics team.
