= Sergio Luini =

Italian gymnast

- Born: 12 November 1972 (age 53) Busto Arsizio, Italy
- Height: 1.74 m (5 ft 9 in)

Gymnastics career
- Discipline: Men's artistic gymnastics
- Country represented: Italy
- Gym: Virtus Gallarate
Medal record
Representing Italy
Mediterranean Games
Gold medal – first place	1997 Bari	Team
Bronze medal – third place	1997 Bari	All-around

Sergio Luini (born 12 November 1972) is an Italian gymnast. He competed at the 1996 Summer Olympics. He also won team gold with Italy, as well as an individual bronze in the all-around, at the 1997 Mediterranean Games.
