= Olga Rajković =

Yugoslav gymnast

Personal information
- Nationality: Yugoslav
- Born: 13 April 1913

Sport
- Sport: Gymnastics

Olga Rajković (born 13 April 1913, date of death unknown) was a Yugoslav gymnast. She competed in the women's artistic team all-around event at the 1936 Summer Olympics.
