= Brenda Crowe (gymnast) =

British gymnast (1913–2004)

Personal information
- Nationality: British
- Born: 31 July 1913 London, England
- Died: November 2004

Sport
- Sport: Gymnastics

Brenda Crowe (31 July 1913 – November 2004) was a British gymnast. She competed in the women's artistic team all-around event at the 1936 Summer Olympics.
