= Wiesława Noskiewicz =

Polish gymnast

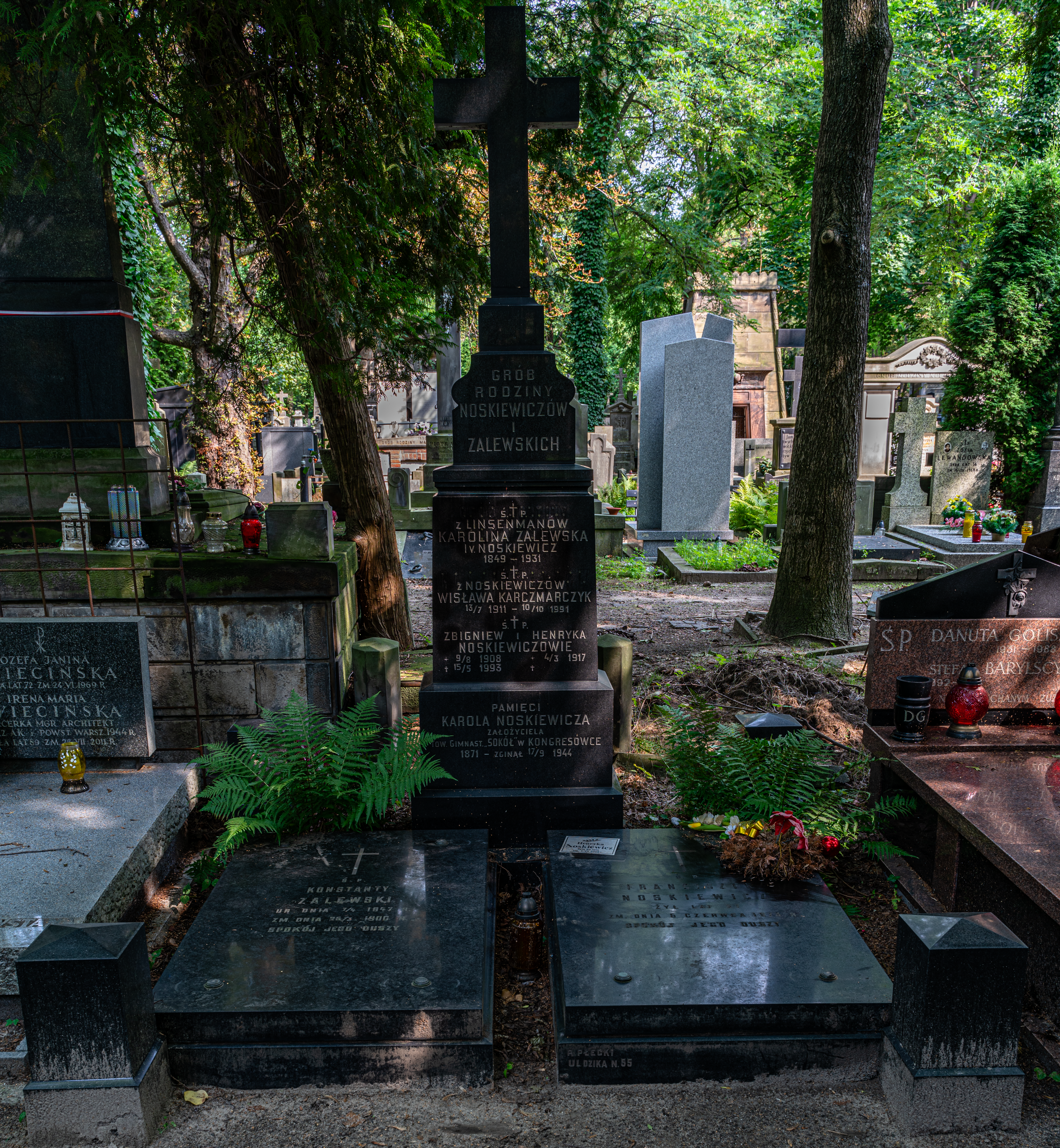
- Wislawa Noskiewicz's Gravestone

Personal information
- Nationality: Polish
- Born: 13 July 1911; Warsaw, Russian Empire
- Died: 10 October 1991 (aged 80); Warsaw, Poland

Sport
- Sport: Gymnastics

Wiesława Noskiewicz (13 July 1911 – 10 October 1991) was a Polish gymnast. She competed in the women's artistic team all-around event at the 1936 Summer Olympics.
