= Mary Kelly (gymnast) =

British gymnast (1907–1986)

Personal information
- Nationality: British
- Born: 30 May 1907
- Died: June 1986; Keighley, England

Sport
- Sport: Gymnastics

Mary Kelly (30 May 1907 – June 1986) was a British gymnast. She competed in the women's artistic team all-around event at the 1936 Summer Olympics.
