= Stefania Krupa =

Polish gymnast

Personal information
- Nationality: Polish
- Born: 14 December 1909; Warsaw, Russian Empire
- Died: 24 September 1981 (aged 71); Szczecin, Poland

Sport
- Sport: Gymnastics

Stefania Krupa (14 December 1909 – 24 September 1981) was a Polish gymnast. She competed in the women's artistic team all-around event at the 1936 Summer Olympics.
