= Aleksej Demjanov =

Croatian gymnast (1973–2021)

- Алексей Николаевич Демьянов
- Full name: Aleksey Nikolayevich Demyanov
- Born: 9 December 1973 Cherkessk, Russian SFSR, Soviet Union
- Died: 8 August 2021 (aged 47) Cherkessk, Russia

Gymnastics career
- Discipline: Men's artistic gymnastics
- Country represented: Croatia (1995–2000)
- Retired: 2000
Medal record
Representing Croatia
Mediterranean Games
Silver medal – second place	1997 Bari	Rings

Aleksey Nikolayevich Demyanov (Russian: Алексей Николаевич Демьянов, romanized: Aleksey Nikolayevich Demyanov; 9 December 1973 – 8 August 2021) was a Croatian-Russian gymnast. He competed at the 1996 Summer Olympics. He also won a silver medal on rings at the 1997 Mediterranean Games.
