= Lyuben Obretenov =

Bulgarian gymnast (1918–2011)

- Любен Райков Обретенов
- Full name: Lyuben Raykov Obretenov
- Born: 1 July 1918 Ruse, Bulgaria
- Died: 2 May 2011 (aged 92) Razgrad, Bulgaria

Gymnastics career
- Discipline: Men's artistic gymnastics
- Country represented: Bulgaria

Lyuben Raykov Obretenov (Bulgarian: Любен Райков Обретенов) (1 July 1918 – 2 May 2011) was a Bulgarian gymnast. He competed in eight events at the 1936 Summer Olympics.
