= Mary Heaton (gymnast) =

British gymnast (1911–1989)

Personal information
- Nationality: British
- Born: 24 February 1911
- Died: 30 March 1989 (aged 78); Bradford, England

Sport
- Sport: Gymnastics

Mary Heaton (24 February 1911 – 30 March 1989) was a British gymnast. She competed in the women's artistic team all-around event at the 1936 Summer Olympics.
