= Rita Peri =

Italian gymnast

Personal information
- Nationality: Italian
- Born: 22 May 1957 (age 67); Novara, Italy

Sport
- Sport: Gymnastics

Rita Peri (born 22 May 1957) is an Italian former gymnast. She competed at the 1972 Summer Olympics and the 1976 Summer Olympics.
