= Meziříčko (Žďár nad Sázavou District) =

- Municipality
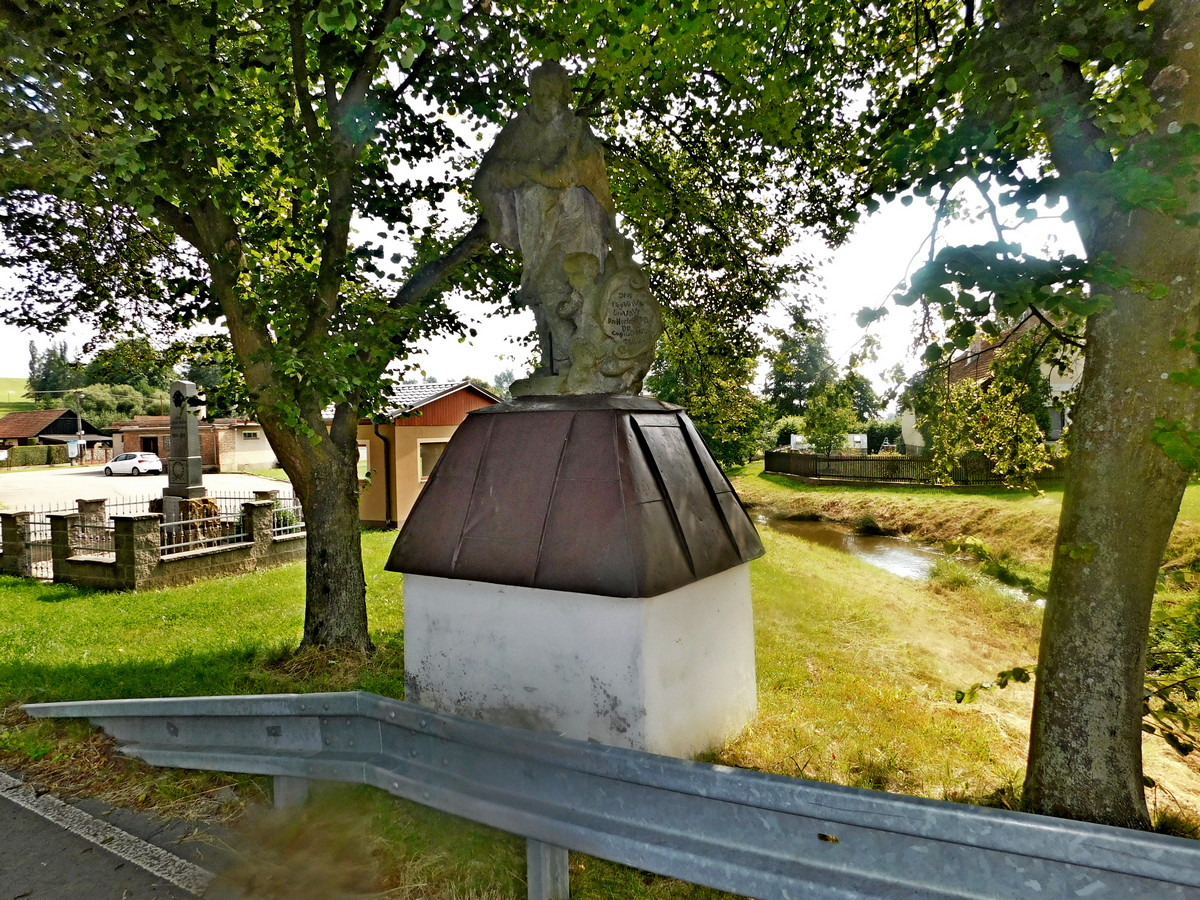
- Statue of Saint John of Nepomuk

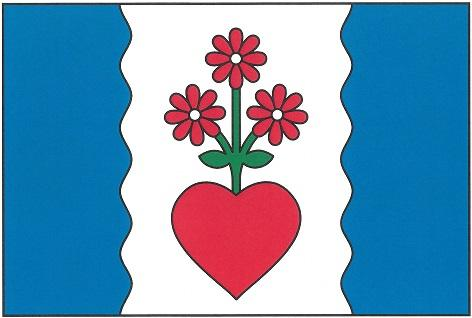
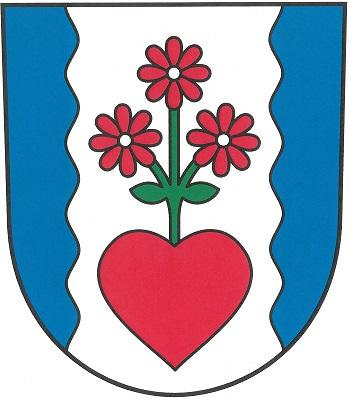
- Flag Coat of arms

- Location in the Czech Republic
- Coordinates: 49°24′20″N 15°50′40″E
- Country: Czech Republic
- Region: Vysočina
- District: Žďár nad Sázavou
- First mentioned: 1409

Area
  - Total: 8.84 km^{2} (3.41 sq mi)
- Elevation: 506 m (1,660 ft)

Population (2026-01-01)
  - Total: 174
  - Density: 19.7/km^{2} (51.0/sq mi)
- Time zone: UTC+1 (CET)
  - Summer (DST): UTC+2 (CEST)
- Postal code: 588 27
- Website: www.obec-meziricko.cz

Meziříčko is a municipality and village in Žďár nad Sázavou District in the Vysočina Region of the Czech Republic. It has about 200 inhabitants.

Meziříčko lies approximately 20 kilometres (12 mi) south of Žďár nad Sázavou, 19 km (12 mi) east of Jihlava, and 128 km (80 mi) south-east of Prague.

== Demographics ==
Historical population
Year	Pop.	±%
1869	388	—
1880	396	+2.1%
1890	377	−4.8%
1900	344	−8.8%
1910	327	−4.9%
1921	348	+6.4%
1930	325	−6.6%
1950	290	−10.8%
1961	303	+4.5%
1970	245	−19.1%
1980	213	−13.1%
1991	194	−8.9%
2001	179	−7.7%
2011	182	+1.7%
2021	167	−8.2%
Source: Censuses
