= Clarice Hanson =

British gymnast (1911–1956)

Personal information
- Nationality: British
- Born: 23 March 1911; Bradford, England
- Died: 23 December 1956 (aged 45); Bradford, England

Sport
- Sport: Gymnastics

Clarice Hanson (23 March 1911 – 23 December 1956) was a British gymnast. She competed in the women's artistic team all-around event at the 1936 Summer Olympics.
