= Margaret Duff =

American gymnast

Personal information
- Nationality: American
- Born: October 19, 1917; Philadelphia, Pennsylvania, United States
- Died: 1974 (aged 56–57)

Sport
- Sport: Gymnastics

Margaret Duff (October 19, 1917 – 1974) was an American gymnast. She competed in the women's artistic team all-around event at the 1936 Summer Olympics.
