= Jesús Carballo =

Spanish gymnast

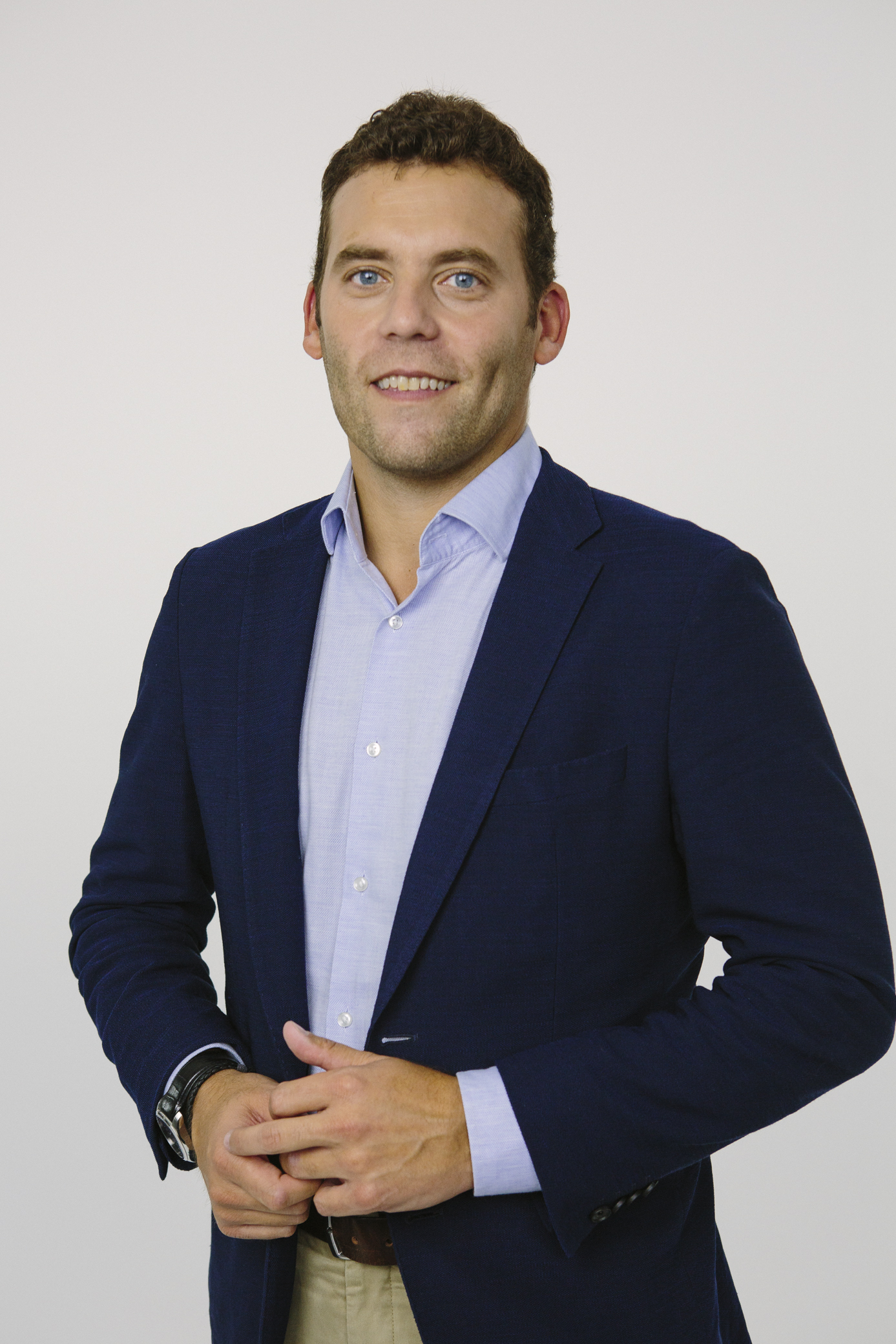

Personal information
- Born: 26 November 1976 (age 49) Madrid, Spain

Gymnastics career
- Discipline: Men's artistic gymnastics
- Country represented: Spain
- Eponymous skills: Carballo (horizontal bar)
Medal record
Representing Spain
World Championships
Gold medal – first place	1996 San Juan	Horizontal bar
Gold medal – first place	1999 Tianjin	Horizontal bar
Silver medal – second place	1997 Lausanne	Horizontal bar
Mediterranean Games
Gold medal – first place	1997 Bari	All-around
Gold medal – first place	1997 Bari	Horizontal bar
Silver medal – second place	1997 Bari	Team
Universiade
Bronze medal – third place	1999 Palma de Mallorca	Rings

Jesús Carballo (born 26 November 1976) is a Spanish former gymnast. He is a two-time World Champion on horizontal bar. Carballo represented Spain at the 1996 and 2004 Summer Olympics. He reached the horizontal bar final at the 1996 Olympics and finished in seventh place.

At the 1996 World Championships, Carballo won the gold medal on horizontal bar, marking Spain's first World Championship medal. He won a second World title on horizontal bar at the 1999 World Championships. In 2010, he was named head of the Spanish Gymnastics Federation.

Carballo won all-around and horizontal bar gold at the 1997 Mediterranean Games, in addition to winning silver with the Spanish team.

== Eponymous skills ==
Apparatus	Name	Description	Difficulty (Note: Valid for the 2025–2028 Code of Points)
Horizontal bar	Carballo	Stoop circle forward to straddle cut with ½ turn	C (0.3)
