= Doris Blake (gymnast) =

British gymnast (1911–1983)

Personal information
- Nationality: British
- Born: 2 November 1911; London, England
- Died: 12 July 1983 (aged 71); London, England

Sport
- Sport: Gymnastics

Doris Blake (2 November 1911 – 12 July 1983) was a British gymnast. She competed in the women's artistic team all-around event at the 1936 Summer Olympics.
