= Marta Majowska =

Polish gymnast

Personal information
- Nationality: Polish
- Born: 17 July 1911 Chorzów, Poland
- Died: 17 February 2001 (aged 89) Katowice, Poland

Sport
- Sport: Gymnastics
Medal record
World Championships
Gold medal – first place	1938 Prague	Vault

Marta Majowska (17 July 1911 – 17 February 2001) was a Polish gymnast. She competed in the women's artistic team all-around event at the 1936 Summer Olympics.
