= Ančka Goropenko =

Slovenian gymnast (1914–2005)

Personal information
- Nationality: Yugoslavian
- Born: 29 October 1914; Ljubljana, Austria-Hungary
- Died: July 2005 (aged 90)

Sport
- Sport: Gymnastics

Ančka Goropenko (29 October 1914 – July 2005) was a Slovenian-Yugoslavian gymnast. She competed in the women's artistic team all-around event at the 1936 Summer Olympics.
