= Robert Tăciulet =

Romanian gymnast

- Born: 8 February 1972 (age 54) Buzău, Socialist Republic of Romania

Gymnastics career
- Discipline: Men's artistic gymnastics
- Country represented: Romania

Robert Tăciulet (born 8 February 1972) is a Romanian gymnast. He competed at the 1996 Summer Olympics.
