= Klara Sierońska =

Polish gymnast

Personal information
- Nationality: Polish
- Born: 28 July 1913; Chorzów, Poland
- Died: 20 July 1990 (aged 76); Bytom, Poland

Sport
- Sport: Gymnastics

Klara Sierońska-Kostrzewa (28 July 1913 – 20 July 1990) was a Polish gymnast. She competed in the women's artistic team all-around event at the 1936 Summer Olympics.
