= Katarina Hribar =

Slovenian gymnast (1913–1962)

Personal information
- Nationality: Yugoslavian
- Born: 28 October 1913; Ljubljana, Austria-Hungary
- Died: 13 November 1962 (aged 49)

Sport
- Sport: Gymnastics

Katarina Hribar (28 October 1913 – 13 November 1962) was a Slovenian-Yugoslavian gymnast. She competed in the women's artistic team all-around event at the 1936 Summer Olympics.
