= Sébastien Tayac =

French gymnast

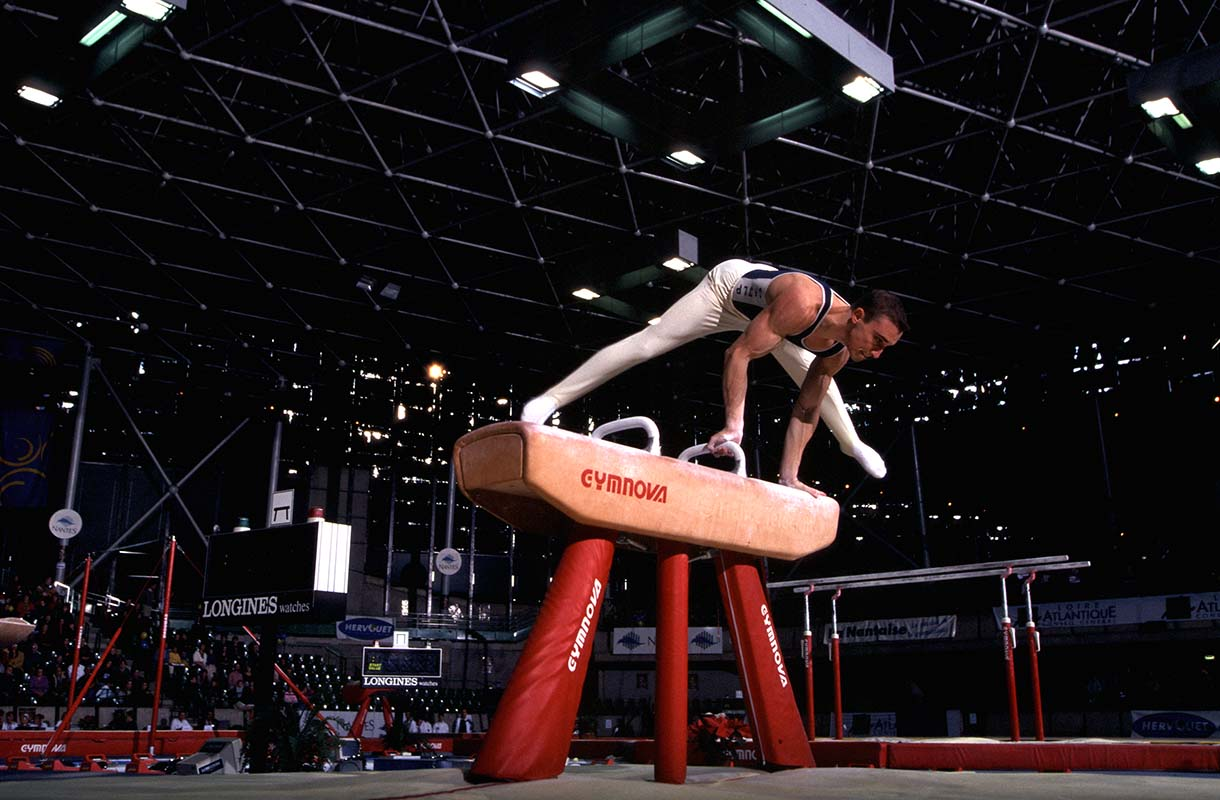
- Tayac in 2001

Personal information
- Born: 4 December 1975 (age 50) Nice, France
- Height: 1.66 m (5 ft 5 in)

Gymnastics career
- Discipline: Men's artistic gymnastics
- Country represented: France
- Gym: Olympique d'Antibes Juan les Pins
Medal record
Representing France
Mediterranean Games
| Gold medal – first place | 2001 Tunis | Team |
| Bronze medal – third place | 1997 Bari | Team |
| Bronze medal – third place | 1997 Bari | Pommel horse |

Sébastien Tayac (born 4 December 1975) is a French gymnast. He finished in twenty-sixth place in the all around at the 1996 Summer Olympics.
