= Edna Gross =

British gymnast (1910–1999)

Personal information
- Nationality: British
- Born: 12 December 1910
- Died: 18 September 1999 (aged 88); Chingford, England

Sport
- Sport: Gymnastics

Edna Gross (12 December 1910 – 18 September 1999) was a British gymnast. She competed in the women's artistic team all-around event at the 1936 Summer Olympics. She was also a coach for the gymnast team at the 1960 Summer Olympics. She later became the President of the Croydon School of Gymnastics, with their top award named in her honour.
