= Adriana Pop =

French-Romanian gymnastics choreographer (born 1965)

- Born: Adriana Rednic; October 22, 1965 (age 61); Baia Mare, Romania
- Other name: Adi
- Education: National Academy of Physical Education and Sport
- Occupation: Choreographer
- Years active: 1988–present

Adriana Pop (born Adriana Rednic; October 22, 1965) is a French-Romanian gymnastics choreographer and former rhythmic gymnast.

== Career ==
Adriana Rednic was born on October 22, 1965, in the Romanian city of Baia Mare. After taking dancing classes for six years, she was directed into artistic gymnastics classes, joining a club in her city. Intimidated by the uneven bars and vault, she quickly came to feel that she was better suited to dancing than to apparatus gymnastics. Soon after, she was directed into rhythmic gymnastics. At the age of thirteen, in 1979, she joined the Romanian National team in Bucharest.

During her career, she trained multiple future World champions, European Champions and Olympics champions, from different countries.

Also, she worked at B.C.G.A gymnastics club in the United States, the club of Nadia Comaneci, Bart Conner and Paul Ziert.

Pop states, "The music is important for me because from the music comes the idea for the routine."

Since 2024 she trains French Hopes and Junior gymnasts in the national sport center of Dijon.
