= Olga Törös =

Hungarian artistic gymnast

Olympic medal record

Representing Hungary

Women's gymnastics

Olympic Games
Bronze medal – third place	1936 Berlin	Women's team competition

Olga Törös (4 August 1914 – 16 February 2015) was a Hungarian gymnast who competed at the 1936 Summer Olympics in Berlin, where she won a bronze medal in the women's team competition. Born in Debrecen, she was selected for the 1936 Games by a delegation attending a national tournament that was being held in her home town. Following the Olympics she received a degree in Physical Education from Semmelweis University and moved to Kecskemét in 1939, where she worked as a teacher for thirty five years. She received the Woman's Lifetime Achievement Award from the Hungarian Olympic Committee in 2011 and turned 100 in August 2014. She died on 16 February 2015 at the age of 100.

== See also ==
- List of centenarians (sportspeople)
