= Margit Csillik =

Hungarian gymnast (1914–2007)

Olympic medal record

Women's gymnastics

Representing Hungary
Bronze medal – third place	1936 Berlin	Team

Margit Csillik (18 November 1914 – 21 October 2007) was a Hungarian gymnast who competed in the 1936 Summer Olympics.
