= Pina Cipriotto =

Italian gymnast

Personal information
- Nationality: Italian
- Born: 14 March 1911; Trieste, Italy
- Died: 30 July 1986 (aged 75)

Sport
- Sport: Gymnastics

Pina Cipriotto (14 March 1911 – 30 July 1986) was an Italian gymnast. She competed in the women's artistic team all-around event at the 1936 Summer Olympics.
