= Adriana Crisci =

Italian artistic gymnast

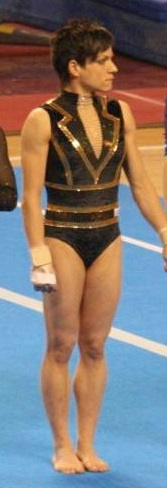

Personal information
- Nationality: Italian
- Born: 24 July 1982 (age 44) Eitorf, West Germany

Sport
- Sport: Artistic gymnastics
Medal record
Representing Italy
Mediterranean Games
Silver medal – second place	1997 Bari	Team
Silver medal – second place	1997 Bari	All-around
Silver medal – second place	1997 Bari	Uneven bars
Bronze medal – third place	1997 Bari	Balance beam
Bronze medal – third place	1997 Bari	Floor exercise

Adriana Crisci (born 24 July 1982) is an Italian artistic gymnast, born in Germany. She competed at the 2000 Summer Olympics in Sydney. She also won five medals at the 1997 Mediterranean Games.
