= Lidia Pitteri =

Italian gymnast

Personal information
- Nationality: Italian
- Born: 9 September 1933; Venice, Italy
- Died: 29 April 2017 (aged 83); Venice, Italy

Sport
- Sport: Gymnastics

Lidia Pitteri (9 September 1933 – 29 April 2017) was an Italian gymnast. She competed in seven events at the 1952 Summer Olympics.
