= Martina Bremini =

Italian artistic gymnast

- Born: 29 December 1982 (age 43) Trieste, Italy
- Height: 161 cm (5 ft 3 in)

Gymnastics career
- Discipline: Women's artistic gymnastics
- Country represented: Italy
Medal record
Representing Italy
Mediterranean Games
Silver medal – second place	1997 Bari	Team
Silver medal – second place	1997 Bari	Vault
Bronze medal – third place	1997 Bari	Uneven bars

Martina Bremini (born 29 December 1982 in Trieste) is an Italian former artistic gymnast. She competed at the 2000 Summer Olympics. She also won three medals at the 1997 Mediterranean Games.
