= Jennie Caputo =

American gymnast

Jennie Caputo (later Pascuzzi, January 5, 1918 – January 29, 1996) was an American gymnast who competed in the 1936 Summer Olympics. She was married to A. Arthur Pascuzzi. Jennie won the all-around 1st prize in the 1936 Olympic tryouts. She was a city and state champion at Central High School in Newark as well as a track and field athlete.
