= Laura Bortolaso =

Italian gymnast

Personal information
- Nationality: Italian
- Born: 22 August 1960 (age 64); Venice, Italy

Sport
- Sport: Gymnastics

Laura Bortolaso (born 22 August 1960) is an Italian gymnast. She competed in five events at the 1984 Summer Olympics.
