= Alina Cichecka =

Polish gymnast

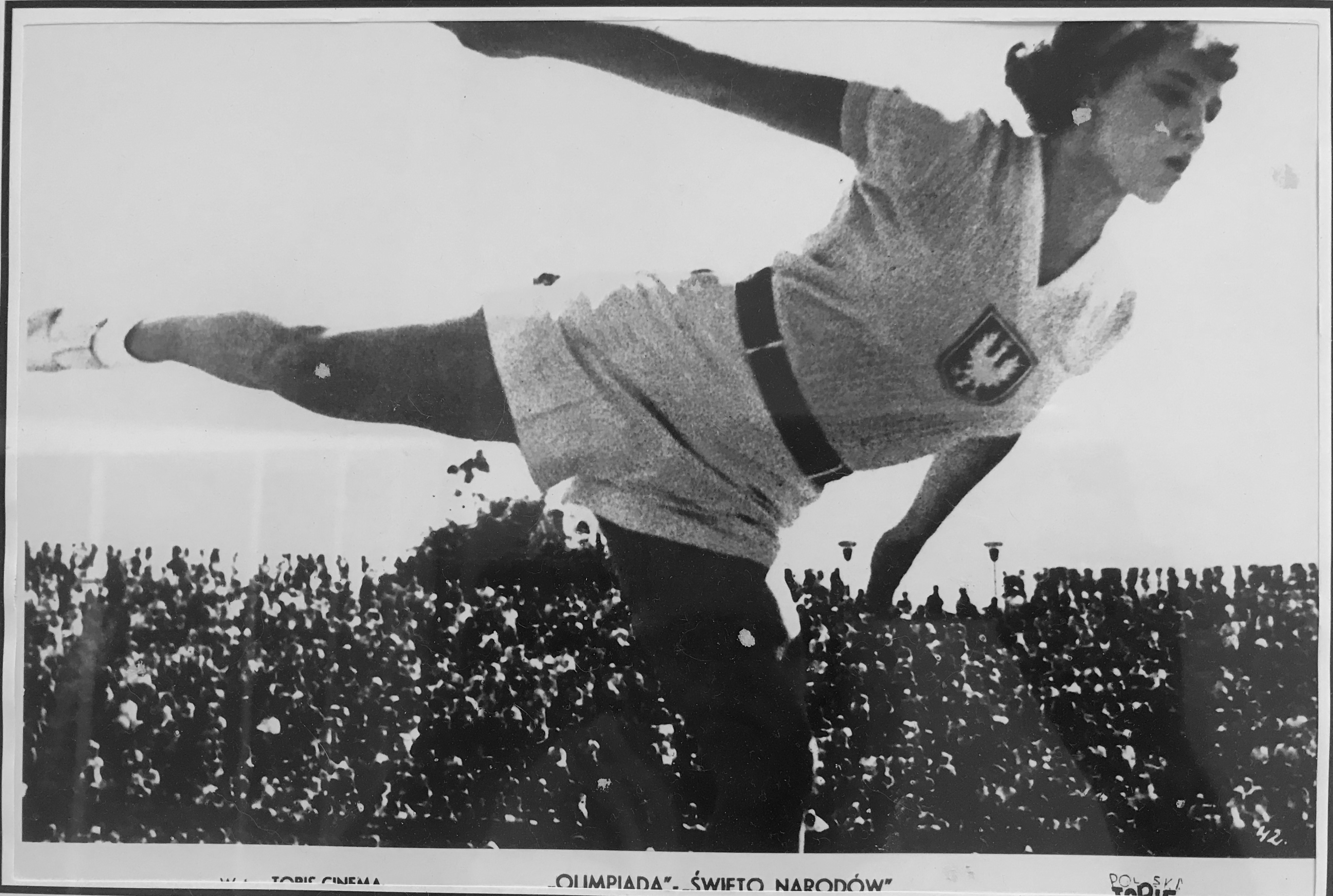

Personal information
- Nationality: Polish
- Born: 2 September 1916; Warsaw, Government General of Warsaw
- Died: 12 March 2001 (aged 84); Sulejówek, Poland

Sport
- Country: Poland
- Sport: Gymnastics

Alina Cichecka (2 September 1916 – 12 March 2001) was a Polish gymnast.

She was born in Warsaw. She competed at the 1936 Summer Olympics, in women's team all-around.
