= Julia Wojciechowska (gymnast, born 1915) =

Polish gymnast

Personal information
- Nationality: Polish
- Born: 5 May 1915; Mielec, Poland
- Died: 5 May 1986 (aged 71)

Sport
- Sport: Gymnastics

Julia Wojciechowska (5 May 1915 – 5 May 1986) was a Polish gymnast. She competed in the women's artistic team all-around event at the 1936 Summer Olympics.
