= Marie Kibler =

American gymnast (1912–1978)

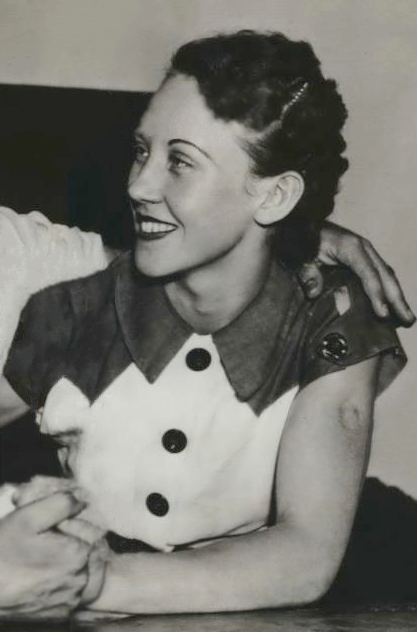
- Kibler in 1936

Personal information
- Born: June 29, 1912 Atlantic City, New Jersey, U.S.
- Died: July 1, 1978 (aged 66) Annapolis, Maryland, U.S.

Sport
- Sport: Artistic gymnastics
- Club: Philadelphia Turngemeinde

Marie Martha Kibler (later Philips, June 29, 1912 – July 1, 1978) was an American artistic gymnast. She competed at the 1936 Summer Olympics and placed fifth with the American team. She later married Chet Phillips, a fellow gymnast who also competed at the 1936 Games.
