= Giulia Volpi =

Italian gymnast

Personal information
- Nationality: Italian
- Born: 30 January 1970 (age 55); Brescia, Italy

Sport
- Sport: Gymnastics

Giulia Volpi (born 30 January 1970) is an Italian gymnast. She competed at the 1988 Summer Olympics and the 1992 Summer Olympics.

== Eponymous skill ==
Volpi has an eponymous skill listed in the Code of Points.

Apparatus	Name	Description	Difficulty (Note: Valid for the 2025-2028 Code of Points)
Uneven bars	Volpi-Zhang	Swing backward with free stoop or straddle vault and ½ turn (180°) over high bar to hang	C (0.3)

== Competitive history ==
Year	Event	Team	AA	VT	UB	BB	FX
Junior
1981	Junior ITA-CSSR Dual Meet		9				
1983	Catania Cup		9				
1983	Junior ITA-SUI Dual Meet		1st place, gold medalist(s)				
Senior
1984	ITA Gymnasiade		2nd place, silver medalist(s)				
1984	ITA-SUI Dual Meet		1st place, gold medalist(s)				
1984	Junior European Championships		10				
1984	Ontario Cup		2nd place, silver medalist(s)				
1985
1985	European Championships		22				
1985	International Mixed Pairs	12					
1986	ITA-HUN Dual Meet		4				
1987
1987	European Championships		40				
1987	Italian Championships		1st place, gold medalist(s)				
1987	ITA-ROM Dual Meet	2nd place, silver medalist(s)	8				
1987	Mediterranean Games		5				
1987	World Championships		27				
1988	European Cup		7				
1988	French International		3rd place, bronze medalist(s)				
1988	Italian Championships		1st place, gold medalist(s)				
1988	ITA-HUN Dual Meet		2nd place, silver medalist(s)				
1988	Olympic Games		27				
1989
1989	European Championships		36				
1989	Italian Championships		2nd place, silver medalist(s)				
1989	ITA-HOL Dual Meet		1st place, gold medalist(s)				
1989	Rome Grand Prix		12				
1989	World Championships		36				
1990	Cottbus International		10				
1990	European Championships		24				
1990	Italian Championships		2nd place, silver medalist(s)				
1990	Rome Grand Prix		5				
1991	Chunichi Cup		18				
1991	Italian Championships		1st place, gold medalist(s)				
1991	Rome Grand Prix		15				
1991	Mediterranean Games		11		7	7	
1991	Tokyo Cup			6		7	
1991	USSR-ITA Dual Meet	2nd place, silver medalist(s)	9				
1991	World Championships		36				
1992
1992	European Championships		24				
1992	Italian Championships		1st place, gold medalist(s)	6	6	6	2nd place, silver medalist(s)
1992	Milan Grand Prix		3rd place, bronze medalist(s)				
