= Liliana Scaricabarozzi =

Italian gymnast

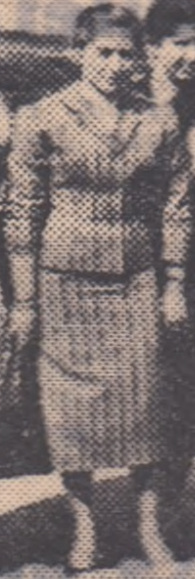
- Sportul Popular, 1957

Personal information
- Nationality: Italian
- Born: 5 October 1934; Lodi
- Died: 21 January 1996 (aged 61); Lodi

Sport
- Sport: Gymnastics

Liliana Scaricabarozzi (5 October 1934 – 21 January 1996) was an Italian gymnast. She competed in seven events at the 1952 Summer Olympics.
