= Irma Haubold =

American gymnast

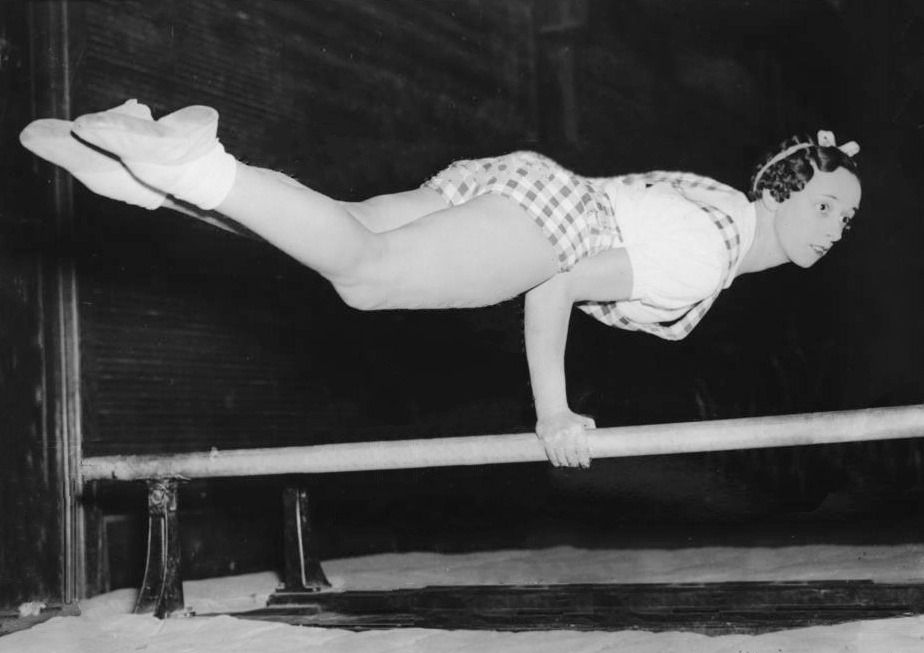

Personal information
- Born: November 20, 1908 Union City, New Jersey, U.S.
- Died: April 4, 1996 (aged 87) Ridgefield, New Jersey, U.S.

Sport
- Sport: Artistic gymnastics
- Club: Swiss Turnverein

Irma Pezzia Haubold (November 20, 1908 – April 4, 1996) was an American artistic gymnast. She competed at the 1936 Summer Olympics and placed fifth with the team. She was married to a fellow Olympic gymnast Frank Haubold. They were the first married couple of compete in the same Olympics.
