= Carmela Toso =

Italian gymnast

Personal information
- Nationality: Italian
- Born: 30 September 1912; Trieste, Austria-Hungary
- Died: 11 March 2002 (aged 89); Trieste, Italy

Sport
- Sport: Gymnastics

Carmela Toso (30 September 1912 – 11 March 2002) was an Italian gymnast. She competed in the women's artistic team all-around event at the 1936 Summer Olympics.
