= Dragana Đorđević (gymnast) =

Yugoslav gymnast

Personal information
- Nationality: Yugoslav
- Born: 2 June 1914

Sport
- Sport: Gymnastics

Dragana Đorđević (born 2 June 1914, date of death unknown) was a Yugoslav gymnast. She competed at the 1936 Summer Olympics and the 1948 Summer Olympics.
