= Ilona Madary =

Hungarian artistic gymnast

Olympic medal record

Women's gymnastics

Representing Hungary
Bronze medal – third place	1936 Berlin	Team

Ilona Madary (23 June 1916 – 11 June 2003) was a Hungarian gymnast who competed in the 1936 Summer Olympics.
