= Marie Větrovská =

Czech gymnast (1912–1987)

- Born: 26 June 1912 Prague, Bohemia, Austria-Hungary
- Died: 21 May 1987 (aged 74)

Gymnastics career
- Discipline: Women's artistic gymnastics
- Country represented: Czechoslovakia
Medal record
Olympic Games
Silver medal – second place	1936 Berlin	Team

Marie Větrovská (married Široká; 26 June 1912 – 21 May 1987) was a Czech gymnast who competed for Czechoslovakia in the 1936 Summer Olympics.

She was born in Prague.

In 1936 she won the silver medal as member of the Czechoslovak gymnastics team.
