= Eszter Voit =

Hungarian artistic gymnast

Olympic medal record

Women's gymnastics

Representing Hungary
Bronze medal – third place	1936 Berlin	Team

Eszter Voit (11 January 1916 – 1 November 1990) was a Hungarian gymnast who competed in the 1936 Summer Olympics.
