= Vittoria Avanzini =

Italian gymnast

Personal information
- Nationality: Italian
- Born: 8 February 1915; Busto Arsizio, Italy
- Died: 17 December 2001 (aged 86); Busto Arsizio, Italy

Sport
- Sport: Gymnastics

Vittoria Avanzini (8 February 1915 – 17 December 2001) was an Italian gymnast. She competed in the women's artistic team all-around event at the 1936 Summer Olympics.
