= Anna Avanzini =

Italian gymnast

Personal information
- Nationality: Italian
- Born: 19 November 1917; Busto Arsizio, Italy
- Died: 24 January 2011 (aged 93); Busto Arsizio, Italy

Sport
- Sport: Gymnastics

Anna Avanzini (19 November 1917 – 24 January 2011) was an Italian gymnast. She competed in the women's artistic team all-around event at the 1936 Summer Olympics.
