= Clara Bimbocci =

Italian gymnast

Personal information
- Nationality: Italian
- Born: 16 April 1919; Lucca, Italy
- Died: 28 April 2008 (aged 89); Como, Italy

Sport
- Sport: Gymnastics

Clara Bimbocci (16 April 1919 – 28 April 2006) was an Italian gymnast. She competed in the women's artistic team all-around event at the 1936 Summer Olympics. Bimbocci died in Como on 28 April 2006, at the age of 87.
