= Gabriella Marchi =

Italian gymnast

Personal information
- Nationality: Italian
- Born: 23 July 1956; Rimini, Italy
- Died: 22 January 1990 (aged 33); Rimini, Italy

Sport
- Sport: Gymnastics

Gabriella Marchi (23 July 1956 – 22 January 1990) was an Italian gymnast. She competed at the 1972 Summer Olympics.
