= Ebore Canella =

Italian gymnast

Personal information
- Nationality: Italian
- Born: 23 March 1913; Genoa, Italy
- Died: 5 July 1961 (aged 48); Genoa, Italy

Sport
- Sport: Gymnastics

Ebore Canella (23 March 1913 – 5 July 1961) was an Italian gymnast. She competed in the women's artistic team all-around event at the 1936 Summer Olympics.
