= Elda Cividino =

Italian gymnast

Elda Cividino (13 December 1921 – 15 July 2014) was an Italian gymnast who competed at the 1936 Summer Olympics in Berlin, where she placed seventh with her squad in a field of eight nations in the women's team all-around. Cividino was born in Trieste on 13 December 1921. She celebrated her 90th birthday in December 2011, and died in 2014.
