= Great Britain women's national artistic gymnastics team =

Great Britain
- Continental union: European Union of Gymnastics
- National federation: British Gymnastics
- Head coach: Martine George
- Training location: Lilleshall Hall
- Uniform Supplier: Kukri Sports & Milano

Olympic Games
- Appearances: 14
- Medals: Bronze: 1928, 2020

World Championships
- Appearances: 23
- Medals: Silver: 2022; Bronze: 2015

European Championships
- Medals: Gold: 2023; Silver: 2010, 2014, 2016, 2022, 2024

The Great Britain women's national artistic gymnastics team represents Great Britain in FIG international competitions. After winning the bronze medal at the 1928 Olympics, the British team have placed consistently well in modern-day 21st-century artistic gymnastics. In October 2015, they won their first World Championships team medal, taking home a bronze. They won a second Olympic team bronze at the 2020 Olympic Games. The following year the team took silver at the 2022 World Championships.

== History ==
Great Britain has participated in the Olympic Games women's team competition 14 times. It has won two bronze medals, at the 1928 and the 2020 Olympic Games. The team has also made 27 appearances at the World Artistic Gymnastics Championships.

== 2026 Roster ==
Senior squad
Name	Birthdate and age	Birthplace	Club
Ondine Achampong	10 February 2004 (age 22)	Kings Langley, England	Lynx Aylesbury; Stanford University
Shantae-Eve Amankwaah	11 March 2009 (age 17)	Bristol, England	Bristol Hawks Gymnastics Club
Erin Broughton	21 September 2009 (age 17)		Notts Gymnastics Academy
Becky Downie	24 December 1992 (age 33)	Nottingham, England	Nile Wilson Gymnastics Mansfield
Ruby Evans	17 March 2007 (age 19)	Cardiff, Wales	Clwb Cymru Caerdydd
Georgia-Mae Fenton	2 November 2000 (age 26)	Gravesend, England	South Essex Gymnastics Club
Jennifer Gadirova	3 October 2004 (age 22)	Dublin, Ireland	Lynx Aylesbury
Jessica Gadirova	3 October 2004 (age 22)	Dublin, Ireland	Lynx Aylesbury
Shanna-Kae Grant	5 June 2004 (age 22)	Leeds, England	Leeds Gymnastics Club
Taeja James	15 October 2002 (age 24)	Nottingham, England	Notts Gymnastics Academy
Alice Kinsella	13 March 2001 (age 25)	Basildon, England	Park Wrekin Gymnastics Club
Crystelle Lake	20 August 2004 (age 22)		Park Wrekin Gymnastics Club
Alia Leat	27 May 2005 (age 21)		Heathrow Gym Club
Abigail Martin	19 April 2008 (age 18)	Paignton, England	South Devon School of Gymnastics
Jamie Reyner-Corbett	2010		Park Wrekin Gymnastics Club
Abigail Roper	7 September 2005 (age 21)	Ipswich, England	Pipers Vale Gymnastics Club
Emily Roper	7 September 2005 (age 21)	Ipswich, England	Pipers Vale Gymnastics Club
Ruby Stacey	10 March 2005 (age 21)	Tavistock, England	Plymouth Swallows
Frances Stone	21 December 2009 (age 16)		Derbyshire Gymnastics Academy
Jemima Taylor	18 March 2009 (age 17)	Newport, Wales	Clwb Cymru Caerdydd

Reserves

- Grace Davies (Robin Hood Gymnastics)
- Lexi Holmes (Clwb Cymru Caerdydd)
- Andrea Ndoro (South Essex Gymnastics Club)
- Tiegan Trafford (Lynx Aylesbury)

Junior squad (age 13-15 in year of competition)
Name	Birthdate and age	Club
Evie Ashurst	8 December 2012 (age 13)	Notts Gymnastics Academy
Isabella Canning	2012	Pinewood Gymnastics Club
Elisabetta Cardelli	2012	Heathrow Gym Club
Renee Coleman	2011	Carousel School of Gymnastics
Helena Finc	27 June 2011 (age 15)	Park Wrekin Gymnastics Club
Connie Freeman	2011	Derbyshire Gymnastics Academy
Anabelle Green		City of Manchester Institute of Gymnastics
Jessica Gow		Falcons Gym Academy
Jenitha Johnson	3 December 2011 (age 14)	Heathrow Gym Club
Madi Jones	2012	Park Wrekin Gymnastics Club
Mai Lannhult		Tolworth Gym Club
Emilia Merrick	2011	Bristol Hawks Gymnastics Club
Aurelia Pellowe	2011	Pinewood Gymnastics Club
Pippa Richardson		Robin Hood Gymnastics
Lyla Terry	2011	The Meapa
Aliona Wessels	2012	Lynx Aylesbury

Reserves

- Nellie Ball (Notts Gymnastics Academy)
- Mia Quinton (Derbyshire Gymnastics Academy)

== Team competition results ==
=== Olympic Games ===
Year	Position	Squad
1928	Bronze	Annie Broadbent, Lucy Desmond, Margaret Hartley, Amy Jagger, Isabel Judd, Jessie Kite, Marjorie Moreman, Edith Pickles, Ethel Seymour, Ada Smith, Hilda Smith, Doris Woods
1936	8th place	Doris Blake, Brenda Crowe, Edna Gross, Clarice Hanson, Mary Heaton, Mary Kelly, Lilian Ridgewell, Marion Wharton
1948	8th place	Joan Airey, Cissy Davies, Pat Evans, Dorothy Hey, Irene Hirst, Pat Hirst, Audrey Rennard, Dorothy Smith
1952	16th place	Cissy Davies, Irene Hirst, Pat Hirst, Gwynedd Lewis-Lingard, Margo Morgan, Valerie Mullins, Marjorie Raistrick, Margaret Thomas-Neale
1960	17th place	Gwynedd Lewis-Lingard, Pat Perks, Jill Pollard, Marjorie Carter, Dorothy Summers, Margaret Thomas-Neale
1972	18th place	Barbara Alred, Pamela Hopkins, Pamela Hutchinson, Avril Lennox, Yvonne Mugridge, Elaine Willett
1984	7th place	Natalie Davies, Amanda Harrison, Sally Larner, Hayley Price, Kathleen Williams, Lisa Young
2000	10th place	Kelly Hackman, Lisa Mason, Sharna Murray, Annika Reeder, Paula Thomas, Emma Williams
2004	11th place	Cherrelle Fennell, Vanessa Hobbs, Katy Lennon, Elizabeth Line, Beth Tweddle, Nicola Willis
2008	9th place	Imogen Cairns, Becky Downie, Marissa King, Beth Tweddle, Hannah Whelan, Rebecca Wing
2012	6th place	Imogen Cairns, Jennifer Pinches, Rebecca Tunney, Beth Tweddle, Hannah Whelan
2016	5th place	Ellie Downie, Becky Downie, Claudia Fragapane, Ruby Harrold, Amy Tinkler
2020	Bronze	Jennifer Gadirova, Jessica Gadirova, Alice Kinsella, Amelie Morgan
2024	4th place	Becky Downie, Ruby Evans, Georgia-Mae Fenton, Alice Kinsella, Abigail Martin

=== World Championships ===
Year	Position	Squad
1966	17th place	Margaret Bell, Rita Francis, Marie Gough, Diana Lodge, Linda Parkin, Mary Prestidge
1970	19th place	Barbara Alred, Pamela Hopkins, Pamela Hutchinson, Susan Lowther, Yvonne Mugridge, Maureen Potts
1974	17th place	
1978	16th place	Joanna Sime
1979	16th place	Susan Cheesebrough, Sally Crabtree, Suzanne Dando, Mandy Gornall, Denise Jones, Kathleen Williams, Joanna Sime
1981	12th place	Mandy Gornall, Denise Jones, Hayley Price, Cheryl Weatherstone, Kathleen Williams, Lisa Young
1983	17th place	Jackie Bevan, Natalie Davies, Amanda Harrison, Hayley Price, Kathleen Williams, Lisa Young
1985	16th place	Lisa Elliott, Sally Larner, Jackie McCarthy, Stephanie Micklam, Hayley Price, Lisa Young
1987	17th place	Catherine Bain, Lisa Elliott, Lisa Grayson, Karen Hargate, Karen Kennedy, Joanna Prescott
1989	15th place	Lisa Elliott, Lisa Grayson, Lorna Mainwaring, Sarah Mercer, Joanna Prescott, Louise Redding
1991	17th place	Jackie Brady, Sarah Mercer, Louise Redding, Rowena Roberts, Laura Timmins, Natasha Whitehead
1994	12th place	Anna-Liese Acklam, Gemma Cuff, Gabby Fuchs, Andrea Leman, Zita Lusack, Annika Reeder, Karin Szymko
1995	18th place	Gemma Cuff, Gabby Fuchs, Michaela Knox, Sonia Lawrence, Zita Lusack, Annika Reeder, Karin Szymko
1997	13th place	Jenny Cox, Gemma Cuff, Sonia Lawrence, Jannie Mortimer, Sharna Murray, Annika Reeder
1999	11th place	Rochelle Douglas, Natalie Lucitt, Lisa Mason, Holly Murdock, Sharna Murray, Annika Reeder
2001	9th place	Holly Murdock, Beth Tweddle, Melissa Wilcox, Emma Williams, Nicola Willis
2003	9th place	Amy Dodsley, Cherrelle Fennell, Vanessa Hobbs, Elizabeth Line, Rebecca Mason, Beth Tweddle
2006	11th place	Olivia Bryl, Lynette Lisle, Leigh Rogers, Beth Tweddle, Emma White, Aisling Williams
2007	7th place	Hannah Clowes, Becky Downie, Marissa King, Beth Tweddle, Aisling Williams, Rebecca Wing
2010	7th place	Imogen Cairns, Becky Downie, Nicole Hibbert, Beth Tweddle, Hannah Whelan
2011	5th place	Imogen Cairns, Becky Downie, Danusia Francis, Jennifer Pinches, Beth Tweddle, Hannah Whelan
2014	6th place	Becky Downie, Claudia Fragapane, Ruby Harrold, Gabrielle Jupp, Kelly Simm, Hannah Whelan
2015	Bronze	Becky Downie, Ellie Downie, Claudia Fragapane, Ruby Harrold, Kelly Simm, Amy Tinkler, Charlie Fellows
2018	9th place	Becky Downie, Ellie Downie, Georgia-Mae Fenton, Alice Kinsella, Kelly Simm
2019	6th place	Becky Downie, Ellie Downie, Georgia-Mae Fenton, Taeja James, Alice Kinsella
2022	Silver	Ondine Achampong, Georgia-Mae Fenton, Jennifer Gadirova, Jessica Gadirova, Alice Kinsella, Poppy-Grace Stickler
2023	6th place	Ondine Achampong, Ruby Evans, Georgia-Mae Fenton, Jessica Gadirova, Alice Kinsella, Poppy-Grace Stickler
2026	9th place	Becky Downie, Ruby Evans, Alice Kinsella, Alia Leat, Abigail Martin, Shantae-Eve Amankwaah

=== European Championships ===
Year	Position	Squad
1994		
1996	8th place	
1998	—N/a	DNQ for Team Final
2000	7th place	Kelly Hackman, Lisa Mason, Sharna Murray, Paula Thomas, Emma Williams
2002	6th place	Katy Lennon, Rebecca Owen, Beth Tweddle
2004	4th place	Vanessa Hobbs, Beth Tweddle, Katy Lennon, Elizabeth Line, Nicola Willis
2006	7th place	Imogen Cairns, Amy Nunes, Melanie Roberts
2008	6th place	Becky Downie, Hannah Clowes, Laura Jones, Marissa King, Beth Tweddle
2010	Silver	Becky Downie, Nicole Hibbert, Beth Tweddle, Niamh Rippin, Jocelyn Hunt
2012	4th place	Danusia Francis, Ruby Harrold, Jennifer Pinches, Rebecca Tunney, Hannah Whelan
2014	Silver	Becky Downie, Claudia Fragapane, Ruby Harrold, Rebecca Tunney, Hannah Whelan
2016	Silver	Becky Downie, Ellie Downie, Claudia Fragapane, Ruby Harrold, Gabrielle Jupp
2018	4th place	Georgia-Mae Fenton, Taeja James, Alice Kinsella, Kelly Simm, Lucy Stanhope
2020	—N/a	Did not participate due to the Covid-19 pandemic
2022	Silver	Ondine Achampong, Georgia-Mae Fenton, Jennifer Gadirova, Jessica Gadirova, Alice Kinsella
2023	Gold	Ondine Achampong, Becky Downie, Georgia-Mae Fenton, Jessica Gadirova, Alice Kinsella
2024	Silver	Becky Downie, Ruby Evans, Georgia-Mae Fenton, Alice Kinsella, Abigail Martin
2025	6th place	Ruby Evans, Alia Leat, Emily Roper, Ruby Stacey, Francis Stone
2026	4th place	Becky Downie, Ruby Evans, Alia Leat, Abigail Martin, Ruby Stacey

=== Junior World Championships ===
Year	Position	Squad
2019	6th place	Jennifer Gadirova, Jessica Gadirova, Alia Leat
2023	9th place	Ema Kandalova, Abigail Martin, Jemima Taylor
2025	7th place	Helena Finc, Jenitha Johnson, Simone Seed

== Most decorated gymnasts ==
This list includes all British female artistic gymnasts who have won a medal at the Olympic Games or the World Artistic Gymnastics Championships.

Rank	Gymnast	Team	AA	VT	UB	BB	FX	Olympic Total	World Total	Total
1	Beth Tweddle				2012; 2006; 2010; 2003; 2005		2009	1	5	6
2	Jessica Gadirova	2020; 2022	2022				2022	1	3	4
3	Becky Downie	2015			2019			0	2	2
3	Jennifer Gadirova	2020; 2022						1	1	2
3	Alice Kinsella	2020; 2022						1	1	2
6	Ellie Downie	2015		2019				0	2	2
6	Claudia Fragapane	2015					2017	0	2	2
6	Amy Tinkler	2015					2016	1	1	2
9	Ondine Achampong, Georgia-Mae Fenton, Poppy-Grace Stickler	2022						0	1	1
9	Ruby Evans						2025	0	1	1
13	Broadbent, Desmond, Hartley, Jagger, Judd, Kite, Moreman, Pickles, Seymour, A. Smith, H. Smith, Woods	1928						1	0	1
13	Ruby Harrold, Kelly Simm	2015						0	1	1
13	Abigail Martin						2025	0	1	1
13	Amelie Morgan	2020						1	0	1

== Best international results ==
Event	TF	AA	VT	UB	BB	FX
Olympic Games	3rd place, bronze medalist(s)	10		3rd place, bronze medalist(s)		3rd place, bronze medalist(s)
World Championships	2nd place, silver medalist(s)	3rd place, bronze medalist(s)	3rd place, bronze medalist(s)	1st place, gold medalist(s)		1st place, gold medalist(s)
European Games	8	8	6	2nd place, silver medalist(s)	6	
European Championships	1st place, gold medalist(s)	1st place, gold medalist(s)	2nd place, silver medalist(s)	1st place, gold medalist(s)	1st place, gold medalist(s)	1st place, gold medalist(s)
Youth Olympics	12	2nd place, silver medalist(s)	1st place, gold medalist(s)		3rd place, bronze medalist(s)	2nd place, silver medalist(s)
Junior World Championships	6	5	2nd place, silver medalist(s)	6	6	4

== See also ==
- List of Olympic female artistic gymnasts for Great Britain
- Great Britain men's national artistic gymnastics team
