= List of Olympic female artistic gymnasts for Great Britain =

Gymnastics events have been staged at the Olympic Games since 1896. British female gymnasts have participated in every Summer Olympics since 1928, except for 1932. British women have won four medals at the Olympics: the 1928 team all-around bronze; the 2012 uneven bars bronze, which was won by Beth Tweddle; the 2016 floor exercise bronze, won by Amy Tinkler; and the 2021 team all-around bronze. Tweddle, Pat Hirst, and Becky Downie are the only British female gymnasts who have competed in at least three Olympics.

== Gymnasts ==
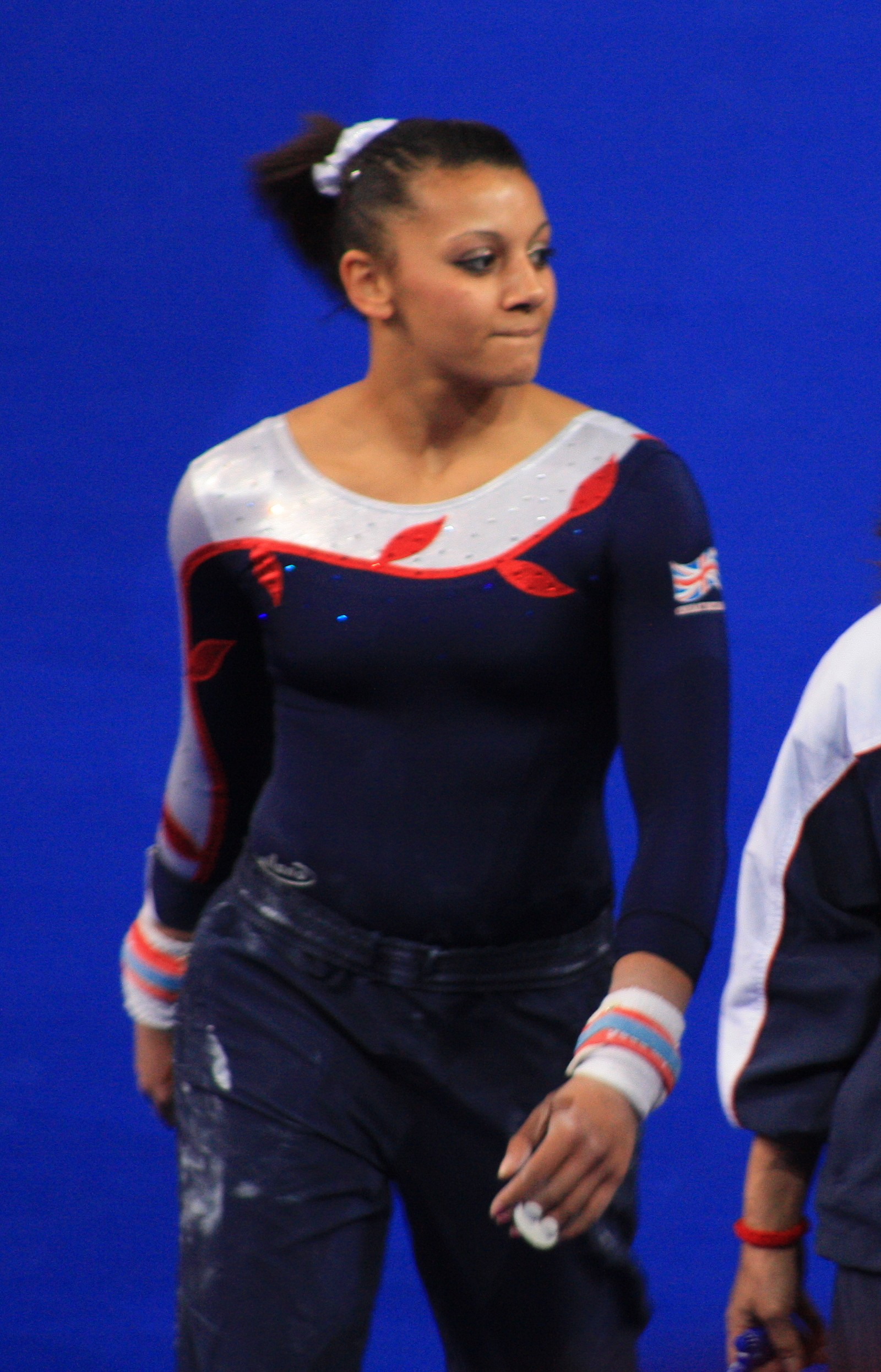
Becky Downie

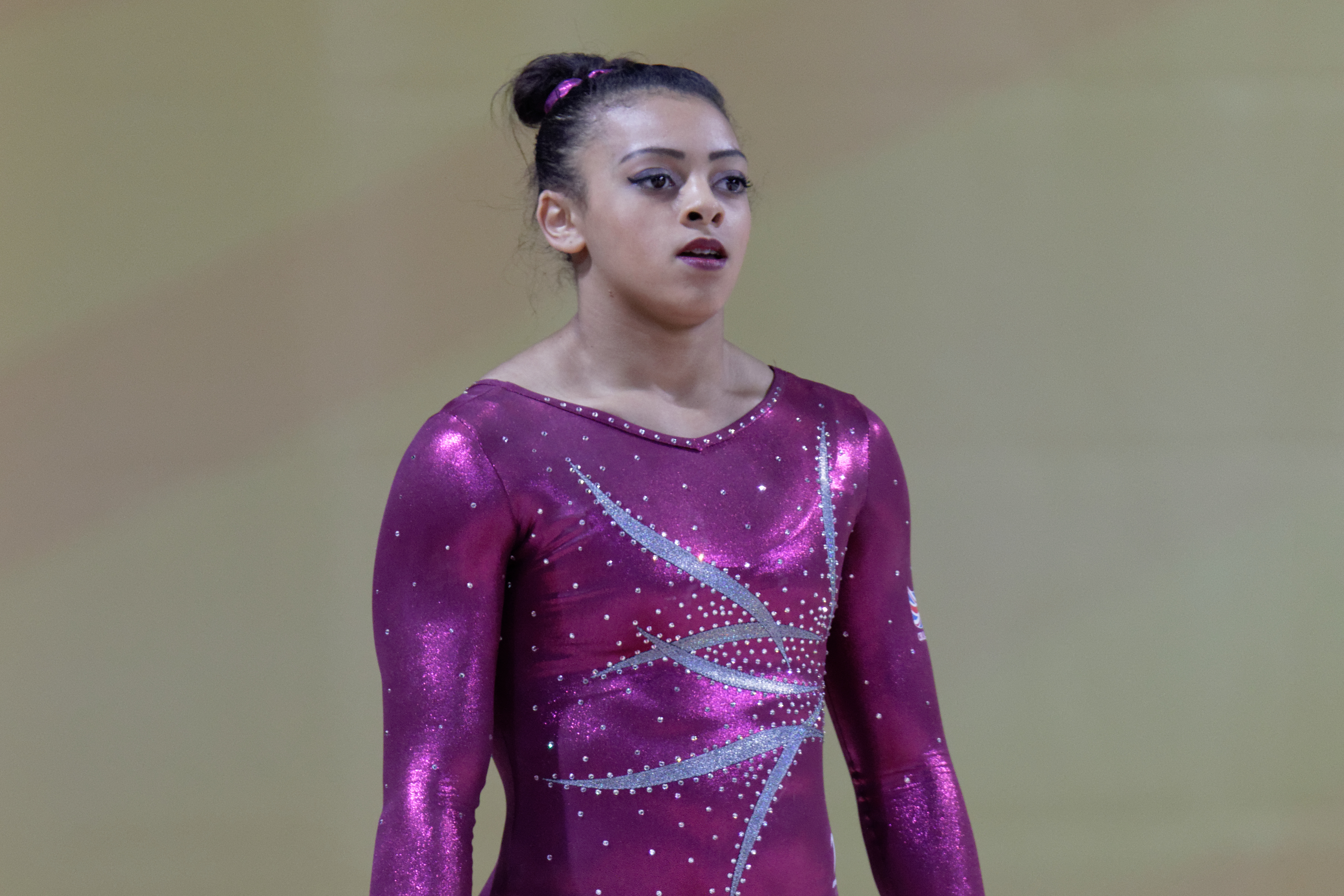
Ellie Downie

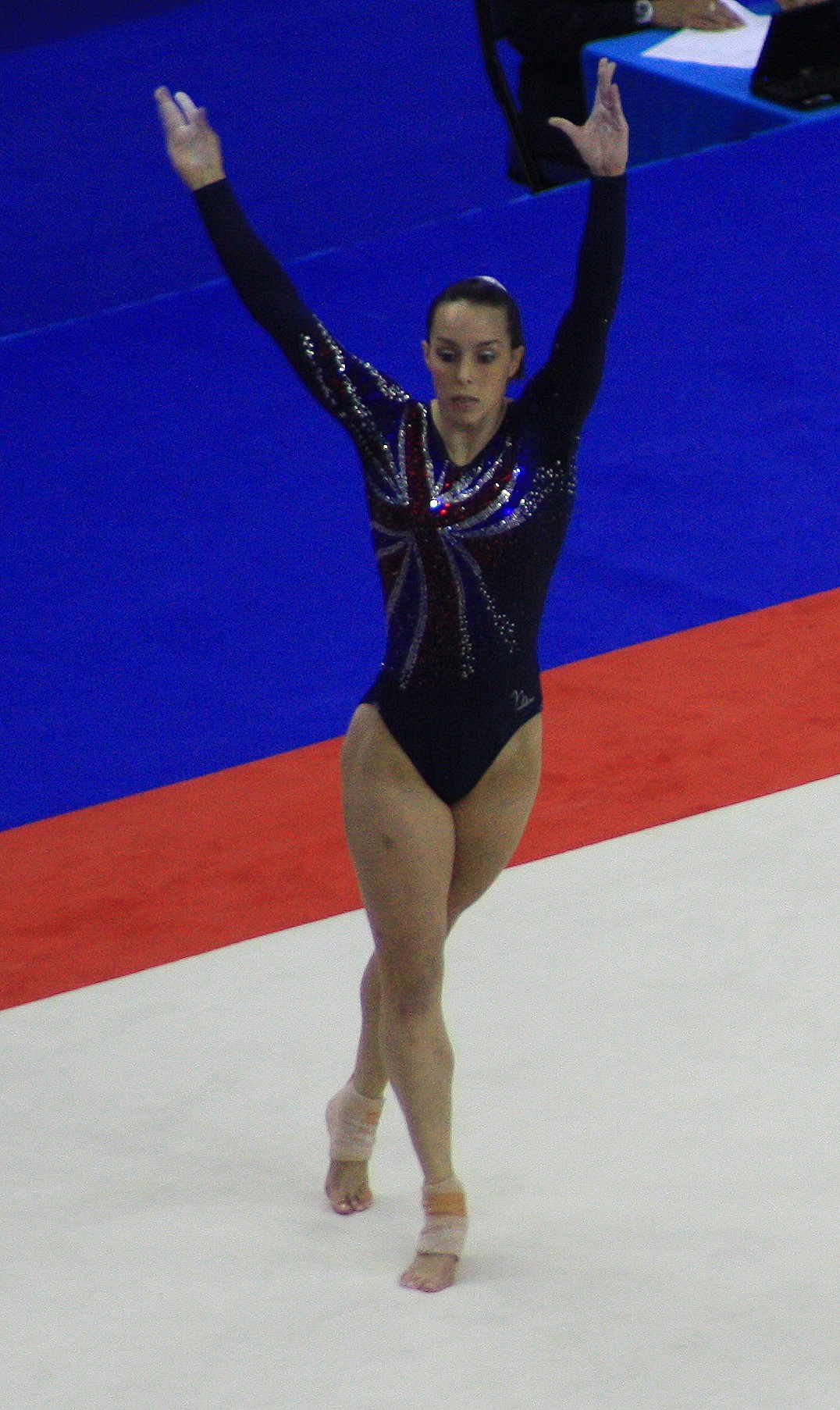
Beth Tweddle

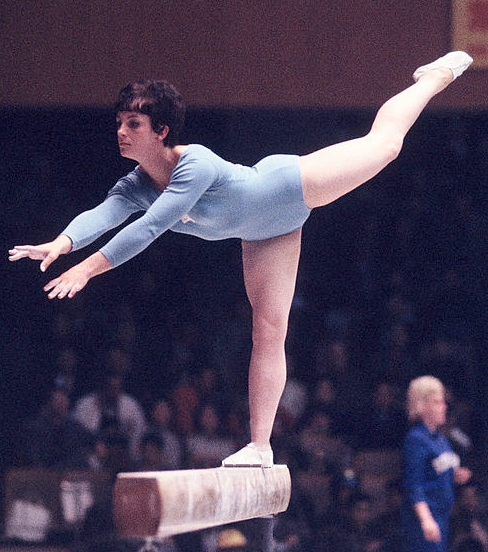
Denise Goddard

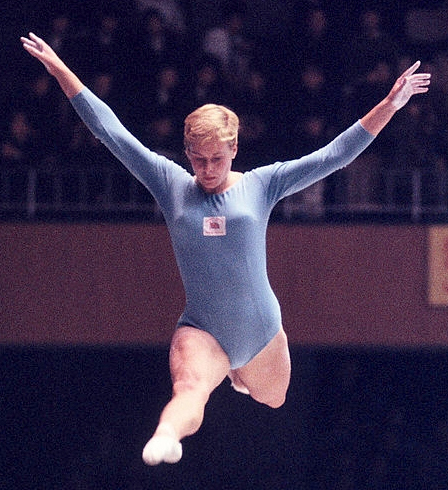
Monica Rutherford

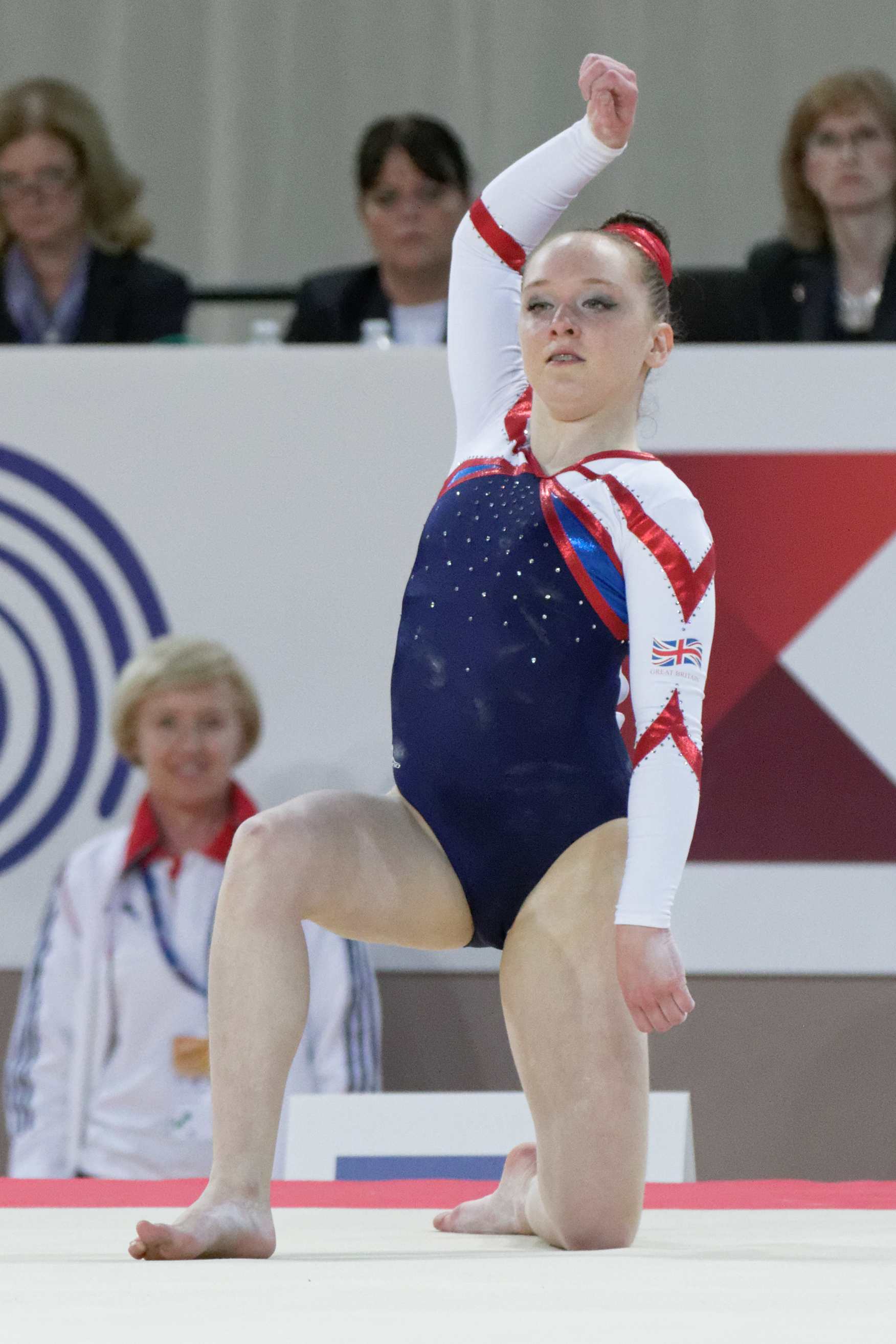
Amy Tinkler

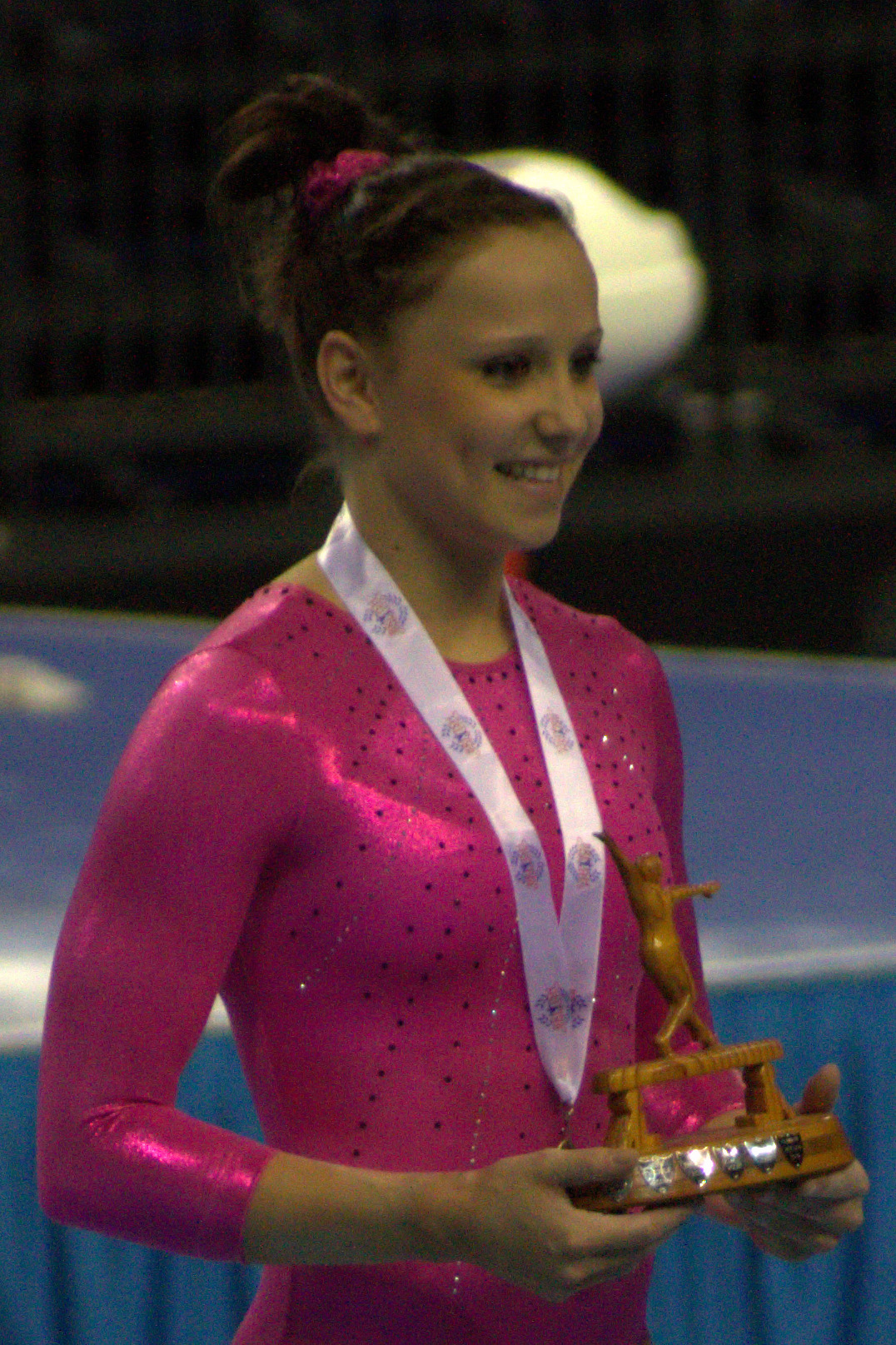
Hannah Whelan

Gymnast	Years	Ref.
Barbara Alred	1972	
Margaret-leah Bell	1968	
Doris Blake	1936	
Annie Broadbent	1928	
Imogen Cairns	2008, 2012	
Marjorie Carter (née Raistrick)	1952, 1960	
Susan Cheesebrough	1976, 1980	
Brenda Crowe	1936	
Cissy Davies	1948, 1952	
Natalie Davies	1984	
Lucy Desmond	1928	
Becky Downie	2008, 2016, 2024	
Ellie Downie	2016	
Ruby Evans	2024	
Cherrelle Fennell	2004	
Claudia Fragapane	2016	
Jennifer Gadirova	2020	
Jessica Gadirova	2020	
Denise Goddard	1964	
Edna Gross	1936	
Kelly Hackman	2000	
Clarice Hanson	1936	
Karen Hargate	1988	
Ruby Harrold	2016	
Margaret Hartley	1928	
Mary Heaton	1936	
Irene Hirst	1948, 1952	
Pat Hirst	1948, 1952, 1956	
Vanessa Hobbs	2004	
Pamela Hopkins	1972	
Pamela Hutchinson	1972	
Amy Jagger	1928	
Denise Jones	1980	
Queenie Judd	1928	
Mary Kelly	1936	
Karen Kennedy	1988	
Marissa King	2008	
Alice Kinsella	2020, 2024	
Jessie Kite	1928	
Sally Larner	1984	
Sonia Lawrence	1996	
Katy Lennon	2004	
Avril Lennox	1972, 1976	
Gwynedd Lewis-Lingard	1952, 1960	
Elizabeth Line	2004	
Abigail Martin	2024	
Lisa Mason	2000	
Sarah Mercer	1992	
Midge Moreman	1928	
Amelie Morgan	2020	
Margo Morgan	1952	
Yvonne Mugridge	1972	
Valerie Mullins	1952	
Sharna Murray	2000	
Pat Perks	1960	
Carrie Pickles	1928	
Jennifer Pinches	2012	
Jill Pollard	1960	
Mary Prestidge	1968	
Hayley Price	1984	
Amanda Reddin	1984	
Annika Reeder	1996, 2000	
Lilian Ridgewell	1936	
Rowena Roberts	1992	
Monica Rutherford	1964	
Ethel Seymour	1928	
Barbara Slater	1976	
Ada Smith	1928	
Hilda Smith	1928	
Dorothy Summers	1960	
Paula Thomas	2000	
Margaret Thomas-Neale	1952, 1960	
Amy Tinkler	2016	
Rebecca Tunney	2012	
Beth Tweddle	2004, 2008, 2012	
Marion Wharton	1936	
Hannah Whelan	2008, 2012	
Elaine Willett	1972	
Emma Williams	2000	
Kathy Williams	1984	
Nicola Willis	2004	
Rebecca Wing	2008	
Doris Woods	1928	
Lisa Young	1984	

== Medallists ==
Medal	Name	Year	Event
Bronze	Broadbent, Desmond, Hartley, Jagger, Judd, Kite, Moreman, Pickles, Seymour, A. Smith, H. Smith, Woods	(Netherlands) 1928 Amsterdam	Women's team
Bronze	Beth Tweddle	(United Kingdom) 2012 London	Women's uneven bars
Bronze	Amy Tinkler	(Brazil) 2016 Rio de Janeiro	Women's floor exercise
Bronze	Jennifer Gadirova, Jessica Gadirova, Alice Kinsella, Amelie Morgan	(Japan) 2020 Tokyo	Women's team
