= Park Wrekin Gymnastics Club =

British artistic gymnastics academy

- Full name: Park Wrekin Gymnastics Club
- Sport: Artistic gymnastics
- Founded: 1960s
- Location: Telford, Shropshire
- Home ground: Park Gymnastic Centre; Lilleshall Hall
- Head coach: Christine Still; Brett Ince
- Members: Alice Kinsella; Charlie Fellows; Georgina Hockenhull (formerly); Becky Owen (formerly); Lisa Young (gymnast) (formerly)
- Website: parkwrekingymnastics.com

Park Wrekin Gymnastics Club is a British artistic gymnastics academy located in Telford, Shropshire. The club has produced several British women's national team members including Olympic, World and European medallist Alice Kinsella.

Park Wrekin has been coached by Christine Still MBE since 1990, a former British national team coach and BBC Sports commentator.

As well as its own facilities, Park Gymnastic Centre, the club also use the Lilleshall National Sports Centre.

== Notable gymnasts ==
The club has produced the following notable gymnasts:

- Alice Kinsella - 2020 Olympic bronze medallist and 2022 World silver medallist.
- Charlotte Booth - 2024 Olympic alternate and 2025 World Cup medallist.
- Charlie Fellows - 2013 European team member, 2015 European Games team member and 2 x World Championships reserve.
- Georgina Hockenhull - 2 x 2014 Commonwealth Games bronze medallist.
- Becky Owen - 2 x 2002 Commonwealth Games silver medallist.
- Lisa Young - 1984 Olympic gymnast for Great Britain.
- Helena Finc - 2025 junior world championships team member.

== Competitive history ==
Competitive history of Park Wrekin at junior women's team competitions
Year	Competition	Team
2017	British Team Championships	4
2018	British Team Championships	2nd place, silver medalist(s)
2019	British Team Championships	7
2022	British Team Championships	2nd place, silver medalist(s)
2023	British Team Championships	6
2024	British Team Championships	2nd place, silver medalist(s)
2025	British Team Championships	7

Competitive history of Park Wrekin at senior women's team competitions
Year	Competition	Team
2013	British Team Championships	3rd place, bronze medalist(s)
2015	British Team Championships	2nd place, silver medalist(s)
2016	British Team Championships	4
2017	British Team Championships	1st place, gold medalist(s)
2018	British Team Championships	3rd place, bronze medalist(s)
2019	British Team Championships	2nd place, silver medalist(s)
2022	British Team Championships	1st place, gold medalist(s)
2023	British Team Championships	3rd place, bronze medalist(s)
2024	British Team Championships	2nd place, silver medalist(s)
2025	British Team Championships	2nd place, silver medalist(s)
