= Charlotte Booth (gymnast) =

British artistic gymnast

- Full name: Charlotte Booth
- Born: 22 September 2006 (age 19) Orlando, Florida, USA

Gymnastics career
- Discipline: Women's artistic gymnastics
- Country represented: (United Kingdom) Great Britain (2024–2025)
- Former countries represented: United States (2021–2022)
- College team: Auburn Tigers (2026–29)
- Club: Brandy Johnson's Global Gymnastics (USA); Park Wrekin Gymnastics Club (GBR)
Medal record
Women's artistic gymnastics
Representing Great Britain
FIG World Cup
Event	1st	2nd	3rd
Apparatus World Cup	0	1	0
World Challenge Cup	1	0	1
Total	1	1	1

Charlotte Booth (born 22 September 2006) is an English-American artistic gymnast who represented Great Britain in international competition. She was an alternate for the British 2024 Olympic team and currently competes for the Auburn Tigers women's gymnastics team.

== Early life ==
Booth was born in Orlando, Florida to Erin and Mark Booth.

== Elite gymnastics career ==
=== Junior: 2019–2021 ===
Booth made her elite debut at the 2019 American Classic where she finished twenty-second in the all-around. At the 2021 Winter Cup Booth won bronze on vault behind Katelyn Jong and Ashlee Sullivan. Additionally she placed fourth in the all-around. At the 2021 National Championships Booth won bronze on uneven bars behind Jong and Madray Johnson. Additionally she finished sixth in the all-around and was added to the junior national team.

=== Senior: 2022–2025 ===
Throughout 2022–2023 Booth competed at various US domestic meets. In 2024 Booth began training at Park Wrekin Gymnastics Club in England. She competed at the 2024 Welsh Championships in the Senior Open division, placing sixth in the all-around. She followed it up competing at the English Championships and the British Championships; she was added to the British Senior Development squad. In May, the International Gymnastics Federation approved Booth's change of nationality so she could represent Great Britain in international competitions. The following month Booth was named as alternate for the 2024 Olympic team. In October Booth made her international debut at the 2024 Szombathely Challenge Cup where she won gold on the uneven bars and bronze on balance beam behind Tonya Paulsson and Leni Bohle.

In February 2025, Booth competed at the 2025 Cottbus World Cup where she qualified to the uneven bars and floor exercise finals. She won silver on uneven bars behind Zhang Kexin of China. During the floor exercise final, she got injured and finished eighth. A few days later, Booth announced that she had ruptured her Achilles and would be retiring from elite gymnastics.

== Collegiate gymnastics career ==
In October 2023 Booth announced her commitment to join Auburn Tigers women's gymnastics team as part of the signing class of 2025. She made her debut with the Auburn Tigers in January 2026.

== Competitive history ==
Competitive history of Charlotte Booth at the junior level
Year	Event	Team	AA	VT	UB	BB	FX
2019	American Classic		22	25	16	13	15
2019	U.S. Classic		28	31	29	21	29
2021	Winter Cup		4	3rd place, bronze medalist(s)	4	6	12
2021	National Team Camp		2nd place, silver medalist(s)	1st place, gold medalist(s)	2nd place, silver medalist(s)	4	5
2021	U.S. Classic		6	4	8	7	15
2021	U.S. National Championships		6	5	3rd place, bronze medalist(s)	9	12

Competitive history of Charlotte Booth representing the United States
Year	Event	Team	AA	VT	UB	BB	FX
2022	Winter Cup		18		15	24	18
2022	National Team Camp		9				
2022	U.S. Classic				3rd place, bronze medalist(s)	9	
2022	U.S. National Championships		15		15	15	17
2023	Winter Cup		8		2nd place, silver medalist(s)	12	22
2023	U.S. Classic		11		9	22	11
2023	U.S. National Championships		24		10	26	25

Competitive history of Charlotte Booth representing (United Kingdom) Great Britain
Year	Event	Team	AA	VT	UB	BB	FX
2024	Welsh Championships		6	2nd place, silver medalist(s)	2nd place, silver medalist(s)	29	10
2024	English Championships				4		
2024	British Championships					5	
2024	Szombathely Challenge Cup				1st place, gold medalist(s)	3rd place, bronze medalist(s)	7
2025	Cottbus World Cup				2nd place, silver medalist(s)		8

== See also ==
- Nationality changes in gymnastics
