= Denise Jones =

Denise Jones may refer to:

- Denise Jones (gymnast) (born 1962), British Olympic gymnast
- Denise Jones (singer), singer with Point of Grace
- Denise Idris Jones (1950–2020), Welsh politician
