= Lynx Gymnastics Aylesbury =

British gymnastics club

- Full name: Lynx Gymnastics Aylesbury
- Sport: Artistic gymnastics
- Location: Aylesbury, Buckinghamshire
- Home ground: Lynx Gymnastics Centre
- Colours
- Head coach: Joshua Richardson; Molly Richardson
- Members: Jessica Gadirova; Jennifer Gadirova; Ondine Achampong
- Website: www.peformance-lynx-aylesbury.com

Lynx Gymnastics Aylesbury (formally Aylesbury Gymnastics) is a British artistic gymnastics academy located in Aylesbury. The club has produced several British women's national team members including Olympic, World and European medallists Jessica Gadirova, Jennifer Gadirova and Ondine Achampong.

Lynx is coached by sibling duo Joshua Richardson and Molly-Mae Richardson. Molly was appointed as lead coach of the British national team for the 2024 Olympic Games.

The club trains at Lynx Gymnastics Centre, a purpose built facility, which first opened in 1986. In May 2026 the building was partly destroyed by a fire which required nine fire crews.

== Notable gymnasts ==
The club has produced the following notable gymnasts:

- Jessica Gadirova - 2020 Olympic bronze medallist and 3 x World championship medallist
- Jennifer Gadirova - 2020 Olympic bronze medallist and World silver medallist
- Ondine Achampong - World silver medallist and 3 x European medallist
- Nikol Stoimenova - Bulgarian national team member and 2025 World Challenge Cup bronze medallist

== Competitive history ==
Competitive history of Lynx Gymnastics Aylesbury at junior women's team competitions
Year	Competition	Team
2018	British Team Championships	3rd place, bronze medalist(s)
2019	British Team Championships	1st place, gold medalist(s)

Competitive history of Lynx Gymnastics Aylesbury at senior women's team competitions
Year	Competition	Team
2024	British Team Championships	3rd place, bronze medalist(s)
