= Tyesha Mattis =

British artistic gymnast

- Full name: Tyesha Mattis
- Born: 17 April 1999 (age 27) Hackney, London
- Height: 156 cm (5 ft 1 in)

Gymnastics career
- Discipline: Women's artistic gymnastics
- Country represented: Jamaica; (2013-present)
- Former countries represented: Great Britain
- Gym: Hendon gymnastics club
- Music: Malaguena
Medal record
Representing Jamaica
Central American and Caribbean Games
Bronze medal – third place	2023 San Salvador	Uneven Bars
Representing Great Britain
Australian Youth Olympic Festival
Gold medal – first place	2013 Sydney	All-Around
Gold medal – first place	2013 Sydney	Vault
Silver medal – second place	2013 Sydney	Team
Bronze medal – third place	2013 Sydney	Uneven Bars
European Youth Olympic Festival
Silver medal – second place	2013 Utrecht	Team
Bronze medal – third place	2013 Utrecht	All-Around
Bronze medal – third place	2013 Utrecht	Vault

Tyesha Mattis (born 17 April 1999 in Hackney, London) is a British artistic gymnast currently representing Jamaica in international competition.

== Gymnastics career ==
=== 2012 ===
Mattis' first big elite meet was at the British Gymnastics Championships at the Echo Arena in Liverpool. She became the Espoir National Champion. She also won the bars final with 12.800.

=== 2013 ===
Mattis competed for Great Britain at the Australian Youth Olympic Festival in Sydney earlier in January. The team placed 2nd behind China. Individually, Tyesha won the all-around and vault competition and also got bronze medals for Bars and Floor. In March, she then went to Liverpool for the British Championships. She became Junior British Champion ahead of Amy Tinkler and Elissa Downie. She placed 1st, 2nd and 3rd in Vault, Beam and Floor finals. Her final meet was the European Youth Olympic Festival in Utrecht. She got a team silver, 2 bronzes in the all-around and Vault and managed 5th on Bars. Whilst she was there, she competed a Silivas on floor in the all-around competition and became Britain's first women ever to compete it.

=== 2014 ===
In March 2014, she traveled to Wigan to compete in the English Championships. She placed first in the all-around. However, an injury forced her to take the rest of the 2014 season off from competition.

=== 2015 ===
Mattis made her senior debut in 2015 at the English Championships in Loughborough, where she earned a silver medal on the uneven bars, while only competing bars and balance beam. At the 2015 British Championships, Mattis won the event titles for both bars and beam (again only competing these two apparatuses) with identical scores of 14.400.

On 23 April, it was announced by the British Olympic Association that Mattis was to represent Great Britain at the first ever European Games alongside 2012 Olympian Rebecca Tunney and 2014 Commonwealth champion Kelly Simm, although due to a recent operation with Mattis and perpetual injuries with Tunney they were both withdrawn from the competition and replaced by double 2014 Commonwealth bronze medalist Georgina Hockenhull and 2014 World Championships reserve athlete Charlie Fellows (gymnast).

=== 2022 ===
In June 2022 it was announced that Mattis and her younger sister, China, intend to return to international competition representing Jamaica.

== See also ==
- Nationality changes in gymnastics
