= Kelly Simm =

British artistic gymnast

- Full name: Kelly Jay Simm
- Nickname: Kelly
- Born: 23 April 1995 (age 31) Southampton, Hampshire, United Kingdom
- Height: 157 cm (5 ft 2 in)

Gymnastics career
- Discipline: Women's artistic gymnastics
- Country represented: (United Kingdom) Great Britain England; (2013–2022)
- Club: Dynamo School of Gymnastics
- Head coaches: Keith Richardson and Debbie Richardson
- Assistant coach: Kerri Upton
- Retired: 30 January 2024
Medal record
Representing Great Britain
World Championships
Bronze medal – third place	2015 Glasgow	Team
Summer Universiade
Gold medal – first place	2015 Gwangju	All-Around
Silver medal – second place	2015 Gwangju	Vault
Bronze medal – third place	2015 Gwangju	Floor Exercise
FIG World Cup
Event / 1st / 2nd / 3rd; World Challenge Cup / 0 / 0 / 1
Representing England
Commonwealth Games
Gold medal – first place	2014 Glasgow	Team
Gold medal – first place	2022 Birmingham	Team
Silver medal – second place	2018 Gold Coast	Team
Bronze medal – third place	2018 Gold Coast	Balance Beam
- Education: Henry Cort Community College, Fareham

Kelly Jay Simm (born 23 April 1995) is an English former artistic gymnast. She is the 2015 Summer Universiade all-around champion, vault silver medalist, and floor bronze medalist. She represented England at the 2014 Commonwealth Games and won a gold medal in the team final. She competed at the 2015 World Championships and she won the bronze medal with the team.

== Senior career ==
=== 2014 ===
==== Commonwealth Games ====
In July 2014, Simm competed at the 2014 Commonwealth Games held in Glasgow, Scotland and was part of the England team that won the Women's artistic team all-around.

=== 2015 ===
Simm competed at the English Gymnastics Championships in Loughborough, England on 14 March 2015. She finished in third place at the all-around competition with a score of 54.550, she scored 14.100 on the vault, 13.750 on the uneven bars, 12.700 on the balance beam and 14.000 on the floor exercise.

Later that Month, Simm also competed at the British Championships in Liverpool. In the all-around competition she scored 14.200 on the vault, 12.800 on the uneven bars, 12.200 on the balance beam and 13.900 on the floor which gave her a final total of 53.100, almost half a point lower than her English Championships score, for joint fourth place with Angel Romaeo. Simm qualified for two event finals, in the vault final she tied for second place with Ellie Downie with an averaged score of 14.175 and in the floor final she again tied for fourth place with Romaeo with a score of 13.550.

On 23 April it was announced by the British Olympic Association that Simm was to represent Great Britain at the first ever European Games. Simm was originally selected to compete alongside 2012 Olympian Rebecca Tunney and senior newcomer Tyesha Mattis, but both withdrew due to injuries. On 2 June it was released by British Gymnastics that Simm was to now compete with double 2014 Commonwealth Games bronze medalist Georgina Hockenhull and 2014 World Championships reserve athlete Charlie Fellows.

==== 1st European Games ====
The first day of competition started on 14 June, which was the first half of the team final and individual qualifications. Great Britain started on the vault first, Simm was nominated to compete two vaults to be eligible to qualify for the vault final. Her first vault, which also contributed to the team score was 14.233, her second vault scored 13.533 for an average score of 13.883 qualifying her in fifth place and on the uneven bars she scored 12.933. These scores also contributed to the first half of the all-around qualification where she currently stood at joint eighteenth place with French gymnast Marine Brevet with a score 27.166. On the next day of competition Simm competed on the balance beam and floor, this was also the last day for the team final and individual qualifications. Simm scored 12.533 on the balance beam and 13.600 on the floor exercise where she scored the same as four other girls but because her difficulty score was the highest making her execution score of her routine the lowest out of the five, Simm didn't qualify for the floor final. Overall Simm helped team GB finish in 8th place with a score of 107.964 and qualified for the all-around final in thirteenth place with a score of 53.299. In the all-around final, Simm placed 11th with a score of 51.932. Unfortunately in the vault final, Simm landed her second vault on her knees, earning a score of zero for that vault and an average score of 7.166 for the two vaults, placing 6th out of six finalists.

==== 2015 Summer Universiade ====
Simm represented Great Britain at the 2015 Summer Universiade in Gwangju, South Korea. Simm qualified for the all-around in third place with a score of 54.800. She also qualified for the vault final in second place behind Maria Paseka of Russia, for the uneven bars final in seventh place, and for the floor exercise final in second place. In the individual all-around final, Simm won the gold medal with a score of 56.332. She won the silver medal on vault with a score of 14.233, placed fourth on uneven bars with a score of 13.566, and won the bronze medal on floor exercise with a score of 13.966.

=== 2018 ===
In April Simm competed at the 2018 Commonwealth Games alongside Georgia-Mae Fenton, Taeja James, Alice Kinsella, and Lucy Stanhope. They won silver in the team final behind Canada. Individually Simm placed fifth in the all-around, sixth in the uneven bar final, and won bronze on balance beam behind compatriot Kinsella and Georgia-Rose Brown of Australia.

On 27 September Simm was named to the team to compete at the World Championships in Doha, Qatar alongside Becky Downie, Ellie Downie, Georgia-Mae Fenton, and Alice Kinsella. Great Britain was the first reserve to the team final. Individually Simm placed 19th in the all-around.

During the year Simm became an ambassador for the gymnastics leotard brand Milano Pro-Sport.

=== 2019 ===
In March Simm competed at the English Championships where she placed second in the all-around behind Amelie Morgan. She was later selected to compete at the 2019 European Championships alongside Ellie Downie, Alice Kinsella, and Amelie Morgan. At the British Championships Simm placed second in the all-around behind Downie. She pulled out of event finals due to injury. She later found out that she fractured her foot and had to pull out of the European Championships.

In September Simm competed at the British Team Championships where she placed first in the all-around and helped her club, Dynamo, place fifth. Later that month Simm was named as the traveling alternate for the 2019 World Championships British team.

=== 2020 ===
In late January it was announced that Simm would compete at the Stuttgart World Cup taking place in March. The Stuttgart World Cup was later canceled due to the coronavirus pandemic in Germany.

=== 2022 ===
In June Simm was selected to represent England at the 2022 Commonwealth Games alongside Ondine Achampong, Georgia-Mae Fenton, Claudia Fragapane, and Alice Kinsella. The group went on to win gold in the women's team all-around competition.

== Competitive history ==
Year	Event	Team	AA	VT	UB	BB	FX
2012	English Championships			2nd place, silver medalist(s)			5
2012	British Championships		9	3rd place, bronze medalist(s)			5
2012	British Team Championships	8					
2012	GER-GBR-ROU Friendly	3rd place, bronze medalist(s)	10				
2012	Voronin Cup	7	7	4	5	7	5
2013	British Championships		7	2nd place, silver medalist(s)	7	7	
2013	British Team Championships	7					
2013	Turnen Dames Interland		8	3rd place, bronze medalist(s)			6
2013	Élite Gym Massilia	3rd place, bronze medalist(s)	14	6			
2013	Pas de Calais International	1st place, gold medalist(s)	3rd place, bronze medalist(s)	2nd place, silver medalist(s)	2nd place, silver medalist(s)		
2014	English Championships		2nd place, silver medalist(s)	3rd place, bronze medalist(s)	5	5	1st place, gold medalist(s)
2014	British Championships		6	1st place, gold medalist(s)		6	
2014	Munich Friendly	1st place, gold medalist(s)	4				
2014	Commonwealth Games	1st place, gold medalist(s)		5			
2014	British Team Championships	8					
2014	World Championships	6					
2015	English Championships		3rd place, bronze medalist(s)	2nd place, silver medalist(s)	5	6	1st place, gold medalist(s)
2015	British Championships		4	2nd place, silver medalist(s)			4
2015	Flanders International Challenge	5					
2015	European Games	8	11	6			
2015	Summer Universiade		1st place, gold medalist(s)	2nd place, silver medalist(s)	4		3rd place, bronze medalist(s)
2015	World Championships	3rd place, bronze medalist(s)					
2016	British Championships		6		5	5	5
2017	Varna Challenge Cup				7		
2017	Cottbus World Cup				5		
2018	English Championships		4		3rd place, bronze medalist(s)		
2018	American Cup		5				
2018	British Championships		1st place, gold medalist(s)		1st place, gold medalist(s)	3rd place, bronze medalist(s)	
2018	Commonwealth Games	2nd place, silver medalist(s)	5		6	3rd place, bronze medalist(s)	
2018	Heerenveen Friendly	3rd place, bronze medalist(s)	5		3rd place, bronze medalist(s)		10
2018	European Championships	4			8		
2018	British Team Championships		4				
2018	World Championships	R1	19				
2018	Cottbus World Cup				5		
2019	English Championships		2nd place, silver medalist(s)		2nd place, silver medalist(s)		3rd place, bronze medalist(s)
2019	British Championships		2nd place, silver medalist(s)				
2019	British Team Championships	5	1st place, gold medalist(s)				
2021	Varna Challenge Cup				3rd place, bronze medalist(s)		8
2022	Varna Challenge Cup						
2022	Commonwealth Games	1st place, gold medalist(s)					

== Personal life ==
Simm grew up in Whiteley, Hampshire and attended The Henry Cort Community College before studying at Itchen College.
