= Ondine Achampong =

British artistic gymnast (born 2004)

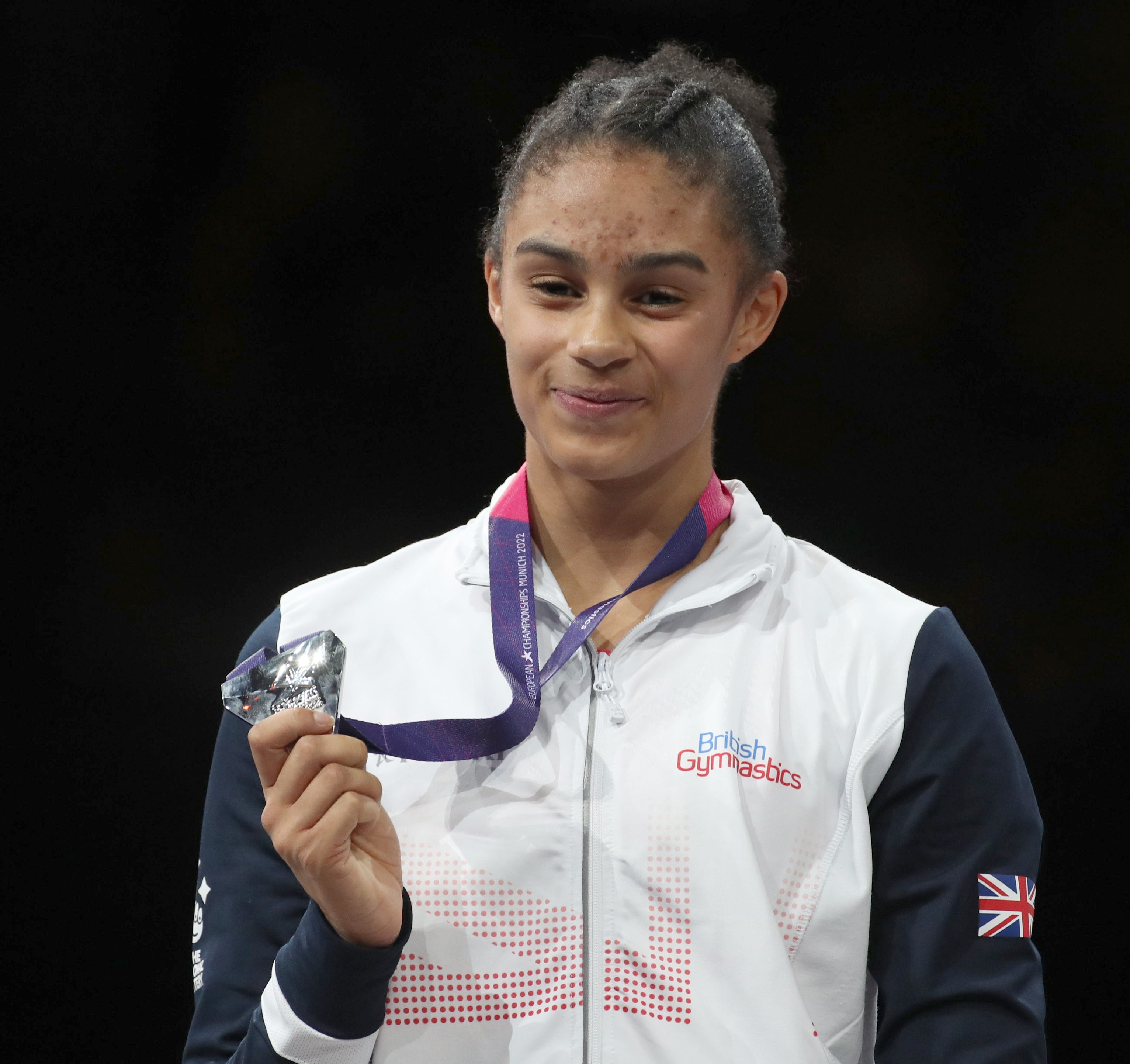
- Achampong at the 2022 European Championships

Personal information
- Full name: Ondine Kathryn Achampong
- Nicknames: On, Ons, Onds
- Born: 10 February 2004 (age 22) Kings Langley, Hertfordshire, England
- Height: 165 cm (5 ft 5 in)

Gymnastics career
- Discipline: Women's artistic gymnastics
- Country represented: (United Kingdom) Great Britain England; (2018–present)
- College team: California Golden Bears (2025–2026); Stanford Cardinal (2027–2028)
- Club: Lynx Aylesbury
- Head coaches: Joshua Richardson & Molly Richardson (club)
Medal record
Women's artistic gymnastics
Representing Great Britain
World Championships
Silver medal – second place	2022 Liverpool	Team
European Championships
Gold medal – first place	2023 Antalya	Team
Silver medal – second place	2022 Munich	Team
Silver medal – second place	2022 Munich	Balance beam
FIG World Cup
Event	1st	2nd	3rd
FIG Apparatus World Cup	0	1	1
FIG World Challenge Cup	0	0	1
Total	0	1	2
Representing England
Commonwealth Games
Gold medal – first place	2022 Birmingham	Team
Silver medal – second place	2022 Birmingham	All-around
Silver medal – second place	2022 Birmingham	Floor exercise

Ondine Kathryn Achampong (born 10 February 2004) is a British artistic gymnast and national team member. She was part of the gold medal winning teams at the 2023 European Championships and 2022 Commonwealth Games and the silver medal winning teams at the 2022 World Championships and the 2022 European Championships. Individually she is the 2022 Commonwealth Games all-around and floor exercise silver medalist and the 2022 European silver medalist on the balance beam. She currently competes for the Stanford Cardinal in NCAA gymnastics, having previously competed for the California Golden Bears.

== Early life ==
Achampong was born in 2004. She attended The Hemel Hempstead School. She has a Horsfield's tortoise named Mishelle.

== Junior gymnastics career ==
=== Espoir: 2016–17 ===
In March 2016, Achampong competed at the British Team Championships where she placed eleventh in the all-around but recorded the third highest balance beam score and helped her team finish fifth.

In April 2017, she competed at the English Championships where she only competed on uneven bars, balance beam, and floor exercise and recorded the second highest scores on uneven bars and balance beam. In December she competed at the British Espoir Championships where she placed first in the all-around, on balance beam, and on floor exercise, and placed second on uneven bars.

=== Junior: 2018 ===
In February, Achampong competed at the English Championships where she placed second behind Amelie Morgan. The following month, she competed at the British Championships where she placed third in the all-around behind Morgan and Annie Young. During event finals, she placed third on uneven bars and floor exercise, and sixth on balance beam.

In April, Achampong competed at the 2018 City of Jesolo Trophy where she placed fifteenth in the all-around and helped Great Britain finish fourth in the team competition. In July she competed at a friendly competition in Pieve di Soligo where she placed eleventh in the all-around but helped Great Britain win the bronze in the team competition.

In August, Achampong represented Great Britain at the European Championships alongside Morgan, Young, Halle Hilton, and Phoebe Jakubczyk. Together they won the bronze medal in the team competition behind Italy and Russia. Individually Achampong finished tenth in the all-around. Achampong ended the season at the Top Gym Tournament where she won gold on balance beam and placed fourth in the all-around and on floor exercise.

=== Junior: 2019 ===
In February, Achampong competed as a guest at the Welsh Championships where she placed first in the all-around and recorded the highest score on each apparatus. In March, she competed at the English Championships where she placed first in the all-around ahead of Halle Hilton and Jennifer Gadirova. Later that month, she competed at the British Championships where she placed first in the all-around and also won gold on uneven bars and balance beam and placed fourth on vault.

In July, Achampong competed at the Sainté Gym Cup where she helped Great Britain win team gold and individually she placed first in the all-around. Later that month she competed at the European Youth Summer Olympic Festival alongside Hilton and Young. Together they won bronze in the team competition behind Russia and Romania. Individually Achampong won silver in the all-around behind reigning junior world champion Viktoria Listunova of Russia. During event finals she won gold on balance beam ahead of Silviana Sfiringu of Romania.

== Senior gymnastics career ==
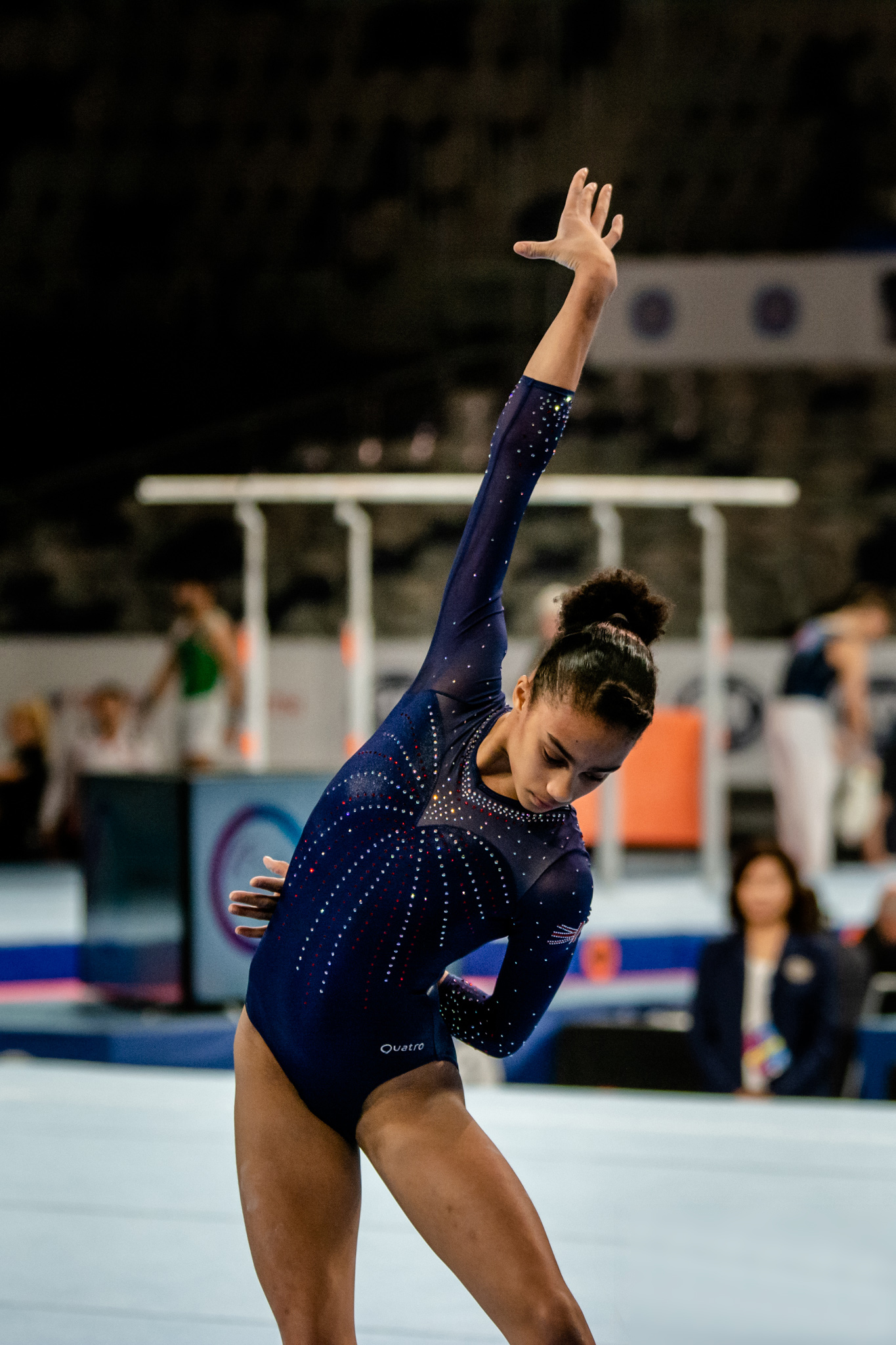
Achampong at the 2020 Melbourne World Cup

=== 2020 ===
In 2020, Achampong became a senior. She made her senior debut at the Melbourne World Cup where she qualified to the balance beam and floor exercise finals. During event finals, she won silver on balance beam behind Urara Ashikawa of Japan and placed fourth on floor exercise behind American Jade Carey and Italians Vanessa Ferrari and Lara Mori. She later competed at the Baku World Cup; during qualifications, she once again qualified to the balance beam and floor exercise event finals. However event finals were canceled due to the COVID-19 pandemic in Azerbaijan.

In June, Achampong announced that she had verbally committed to the University of California, Berkeley to compete for their gymnastics program.

=== 2021 ===
In April, Achampong was named as an alternate for the European Championships. In May, Achampong competed at the Varna World Challenge Cup, where she qualified to the uneven bars, balance beam and floor exercise finals. During event finals, she placed third on balance beam behind Anastasiia Bachynska of Ukraine and Marine Boyer of France.

In November, Achampong competed at the British Championships and won gold in the all-around, silver on uneven bars and on balance beam, and bronze on floor exercise.

=== 2022 ===
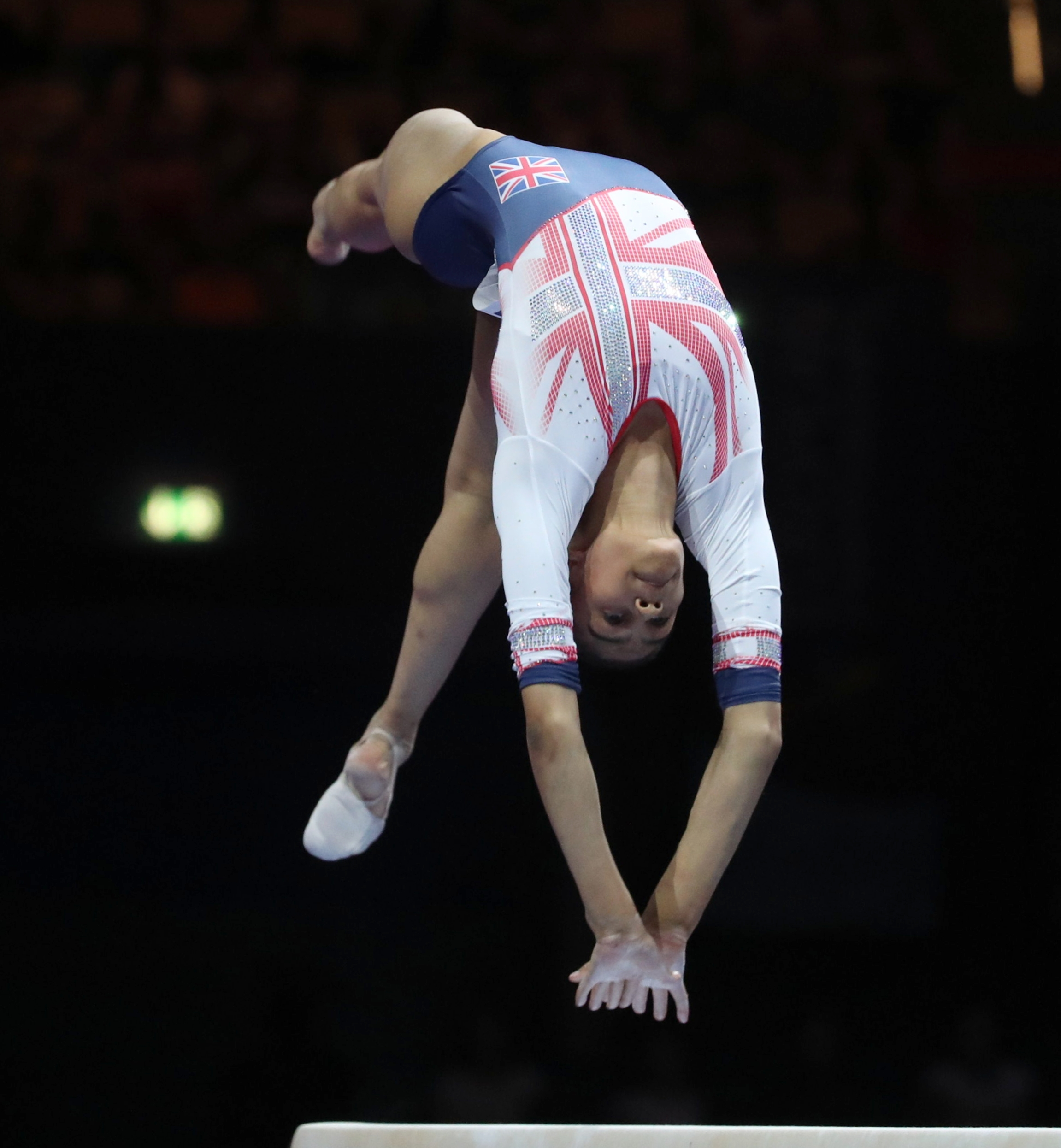
Achampong at the 2022 European Championships

Achampong competed at the English and British Championships where she finished fourth and second in the all-around. In June, she was selected to represent England at the 2022 Commonwealth Games alongside Georgia-Mae Fenton, Claudia Fragapane, Alice Kinsella, and Kelly Simm. The group went on to win gold in the team competition while Achampong also took silver in the individual all-around.

Achampong was also selected to compete at the European Championships alongside Kinsella, Fenton, and Aylesbury teammates Jennifer and Jessica Gadirova. In August Achampong competed at the European Championships. She contributed scores on vault, uneven bars, and balance beam towards Great Britain's second-place finish. During event finals, Achampong won silver on balance beam behind Emma Malewski of Germany.

In September, Achampong was named to the team to compete at the 2022 World Championships, once again alongside the Gadirova twins, Kinsella, and Fenton. She finished fifteenth in qualifications, but did not advance to the all-around due to teammates Gadirova and Kinsella placing higher. During the team final, Achampong competed on vault and balance beam, helping Great Britain win the silver medal and achieve their highest placement at a World Championships.

=== 2023 ===
At the English Championships, Achampong placed first in the all-around, on uneven bars, and on floor exercise as well as placing second on balance beam. She then went on to compete the Welsh Championships, where she placed second on balance beam and in the all-around and placed third on uneven bars and floor exercise. At British Championships she placed second all-around and first on balance beam. Achampong was named to the team to compete at the upcoming European Championships alongside Becky Downie, Georgia-Mae Fenton, Jessica Gadirova, and Alice Kinsella. At the European Championships, Achampong helped Great Britain win their first team gold medal. Additionally she qualified to the balance beam final.

In September, Achampong was selected to represent Great Britain at the 2023 World Championships alongside Gadirova, Kinsella, Fenton, and Ruby Evans. While there, she helped the team qualify in second to the team final. Individually, Achampong qualified to the all-around final. During the team final, Achampong contributed scores on vault and balance beam towards Great Britain's sixth place finish. During the all-around final, she finished thirteenth.

In November, Achampong signed her National Letter of Intent with the California Golden Bears.

=== 2024 ===
Achampong began the year competing at the Cairo World Cup. She finished third on the uneven bars and fourth on balance beam. At the English Championships, she placed first all-around and on the balance beam, as well as second on the uneven bars and floor exercise. At the British Championships, she placed first all-around, on the uneven bars, the balance beam, and the floor exercise. Achampong was initially named to the team to compete at the European Championships; however she withdrew as a precautionary measure. It was later revealed that Achampong had torn her ACL while performing an uneven bars dismount at a controlled competition.

== Collegiate gymnastics career ==
=== 2024–2025 Season ===
In September 2024 Achampong moved to Berkeley, California to join the California Golden Bears gymnastics team. She made her return from ACL injury as an exhibition on balance beam against Stanford on 7 February 2025. Two weeks later she made her official NCAA debut on beam against Pittsburgh where she scored a 9.775. She went on to compete on beam for the rest of the regular season helping the team take the Atlantic Coast Conference regular season title. At the ACC Championships she came fourth on beam where her score of 9.875 helped the Cal Bears place second behind Stanford.

=== 2025–2026 Season ===
In January 2026 Achampong announced via Instagram that she had partially retorn her ACL in November 2025 and would be undergoing her second ACL reconstruction.

=== 2026–2027 Season ===
Acahampong announced In May 2026 that she had transferred to Stanford University to join Stanford Cardinal gymnastics team.

=== Regular season ranking ===
Season	All-around	Vault	Uneven bars	Balance beam	Floor exercise
2025	N/A	N/A	N/A	355th	N/A

== Competitive history ==
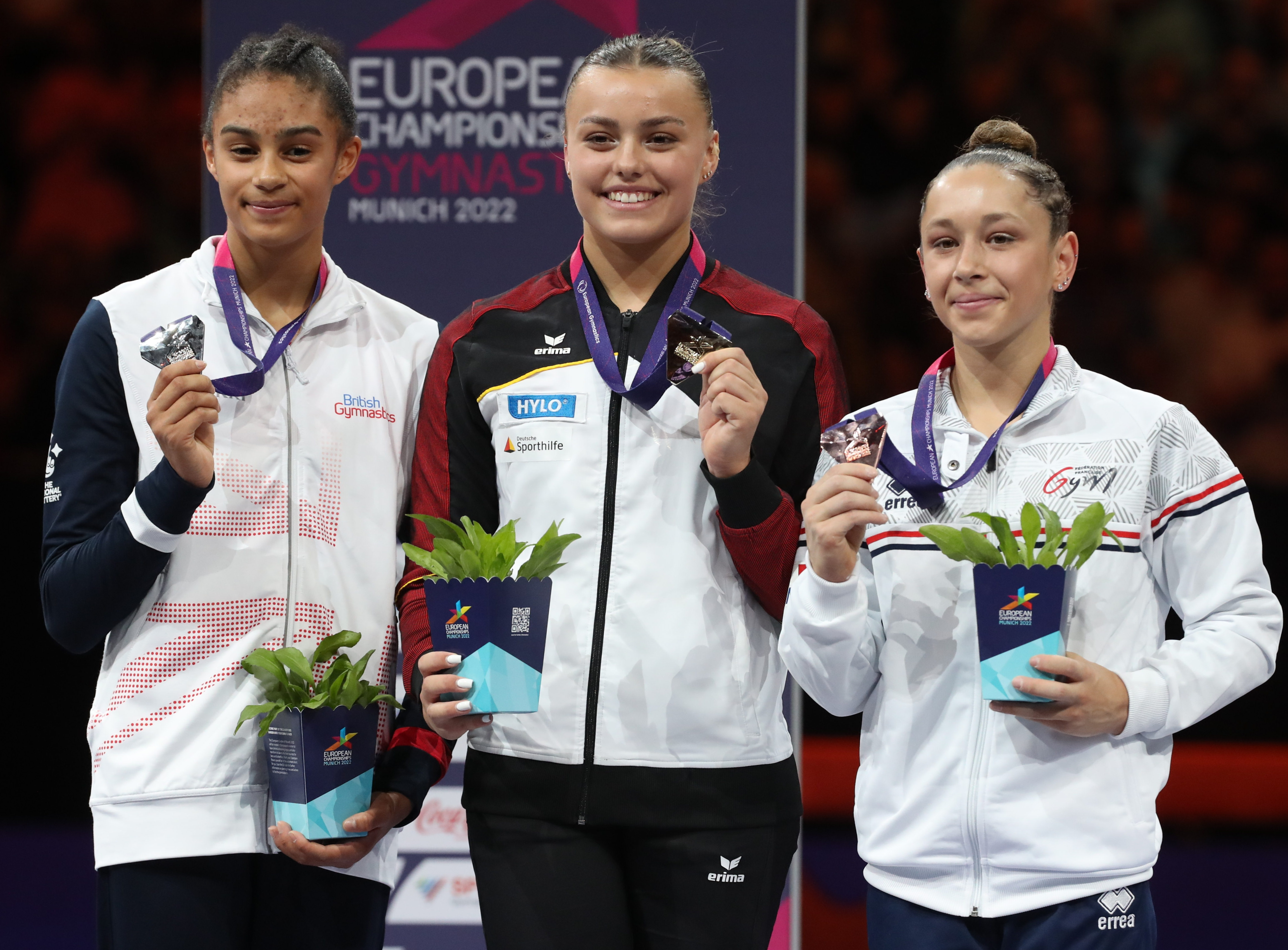
Achampong (left) with the balance beam medalists at the 2022 European Championships

Competitive history of Ondine Achampong at the junior level
Year	Event	Team	AA	VT	UB	BB	FX
2016	British Team Championships (espoir)	5	11				
2017	English Championships (espoir)				2nd place, silver medalist(s)	2nd place, silver medalist(s)	
2017	British Championships (espoir)		1st place, gold medalist(s)		2nd place, silver medalist(s)	1st place, gold medalist(s)	1st place, gold medalist(s)
2018	English Championships		2nd place, silver medalist(s)				
2018	British Championships		3rd place, bronze medalist(s)		3rd place, bronze medalist(s)	6	3rd place, bronze medalist(s)
2018	City of Jesolo Trophy	4	15				
2018	Pieve di Soligo Friendly	3rd place, bronze medalist(s)	11				
2018	European Championships	3rd place, bronze medalist(s)	10				
2018	Top Gym Tournament		4			1st place, gold medalist(s)	4
2019	Welsh Championships		1st place, gold medalist(s)	1st place, gold medalist(s)	1st place, gold medalist(s)	1st place, gold medalist(s)	1st place, gold medalist(s)
2019	English Championships		1st place, gold medalist(s)		1st place, gold medalist(s)	2nd place, silver medalist(s)	2nd place, silver medalist(s)
2019	British Championships		1st place, gold medalist(s)	4	1st place, gold medalist(s)	1st place, gold medalist(s)	
2019	Sainté Gym Cup	1st place, gold medalist(s)	1st place, gold medalist(s)				
2019	European Youth Olympic Festival	3rd place, bronze medalist(s)	2nd place, silver medalist(s)			1st place, gold medalist(s)	

Competitive history of Ondine Achampong at the senior level
Year	Event	Team	AA	VT	UB	BB	FX
2020	Melbourne World Cup					2nd place, silver medalist(s)	4
2020	Baku World Cup					6	6
2021	Varna Challenge Cup				5	3rd place, bronze medalist(s)	5
2021	British Championships		1st place, gold medalist(s)		2nd place, silver medalist(s)	2nd place, silver medalist(s)	3rd place, bronze medalist(s)
2022	English Championships		4		10	2nd place, silver medalist(s)	10
2022	British Championships		2nd place, silver medalist(s)				
2022	Commonwealth Games	1st place, gold medalist(s)	2nd place, silver medalist(s)		4		2nd place, silver medalist(s)
2022	European Championships	2nd place, silver medalist(s)				2nd place, silver medalist(s)	
2022	World Championships	2nd place, silver medalist(s)					
2023	English Championships		1st place, gold medalist(s)				
2023	Welsh Championships (guest)		2nd place, silver medalist(s)				
2023	British Championships		2nd place, silver medalist(s)		5	1st place, gold medalist(s)	8
2023	European Championships	1st place, gold medalist(s)				4	
2023	World Championships	6	13				
2024	Cairo World Cup				3rd place, bronze medalist(s)	4	
2024	English Championships		1st place, gold medalist(s)		2nd place, silver medalist(s)	1st place, gold medalist(s)	2nd place, silver medalist(s)
2024	British Championships		1st place, gold medalist(s)		1st place, gold medalist(s)	1st place, gold medalist(s)	1st place, gold medalist(s)

Competitive history of Ondine Achampong at the NCAA level
Year	Event	Team	AA	VT	UB	BB	FX
2025	ACC Championships	2nd place, silver medalist(s)				4	
2026	ACC Championships	3rd place, bronze medalist(s)					
