= Charlie Fellows (gymnast) =

British artistic gymnast

- Full name: Charlie Fellows
- Nickname: Charlie
- Born: 1 January 1997 (age 29) Birmingham, England, United Kingdom
- Height: 154 cm (5.05 ft)

Gymnastics career
- Discipline: Women's artistic gymnastics
- Country represented: Great Britain England; (Years)
- Former countries represented: Great Britain
- Club: Park Wrekin Gymnastics Club
- Head coach: Christine Still
- Retired: March 2018
Medal record
Representing Great Britain
World Championships
Bronze medal – third place	2015 Glasgow	Team

Charlie Fellows (born 1 January 1997) is a British artistic gymnast. She was a reserve gymnast for the 2014 World Artistic Gymnastics Championships in Nanning, China, and the 2015 World Artistic Gymnastics Championships in Glasgow, Scotland.

Since her retirement, Charlie moved from her home town and is currently living in Leeds and is now a coach at the Leeds Rebound Gymnastic Club.

== Junior career ==
=== 2011 ===
In July Fellows competed at the British Junior Championships. She placed 4th in the all-around competition scoring 52.350, she scored 13.300 on the vault, 13.150 on the uneven bars, 12.750 on the balance beam and 13.150 on the floor exercise. In the event finals she placed 8th on the uneven bars with a score of 11.150, 7th on the balance beam with a score of 11.600 and 7th on the floor exercise with a final score of 13.250.

In September Fellows competed for England at the 2011 Commonwealth Youth Games in the Isle of Man. She was part of the gold medal winning team with a total 159.750. Fellows also won the gold medal in the uneven bars final with a score of 13.250 and a bronze medal on the balance beam with a final score 12.750.

=== 2012 ===
In May, Fellows competed at the 2012 European Junior Championships in Brussels, Belgium. She helped the junior team finish in fourth place contributing scores on 3 apparatuses. She scored 13.300 on the vault, 13.433 on the uneven bars and 13.333 on the floor exercise. Due to the 2 gymnasts per country rule, Fellows 13th place all-around score did not qualify for the final, as teammates Gabrielle Jupp who qualified in 7th place and Angel Romaeo in 11th place took the two places. She was first reserve for the uneven bars final. Fellows did however qualify for the floor exercise final in 12th place with a score of 13.333. In the final, Fellows improved on her qualifying score to finish in 7th place with 13.466.

Towards the end of June, Fellows competed at her second British Junior Championships. She placed third in the all-around final, she scored 13.650 on the vault, 12.850 on the uneven bars, 11.700 on the balance beam and 13.550 on the floor exercise for a combined total of 51.750. Fellows qualified for the uneven bars final where she scored 12.950, enough to earn her a silver medal, and in the floor exercise final, Fellows finished in 4th place with 13.600.

== Senior career ==
=== 2013 ===
In March, Fellows competed at the British Championships, this was her first year as a senior. She won the silver medal in the all-around competition with a final score of 54.900. she scored 14.050 on the vault, 13.350 on the uneven bars, 13.300 on the balance beam and 14.200 on the floor exercise. In the uneven bars final, Fellows tied for 5th place with Niamh Rippin with a score of 13.150, she also placed 6th in the balance beam final with a score of 11.600 and in the floor exercise final she placed 4th with a score of 13.950.

In April Fellows competed at the 2013 European Championships in Moscow, Russia. Fellows qualified in 15th place for the all-around final, she scored 13.900 on the vault, 13.100 on the uneven bars, 13.200 on the balance beam and 12.366 on the floor exercise for an all-around total of 52.566. In the final for the all-around competition she placed 18th scoring 13.633 on the vault, 13.200 on the uneven bars, 12.100 on the balance beam and 12.266 on the floor exercise. Fellows did not qualify for any individual event final.

=== 2014 ===
At the end of March, fellows competed at the British championships. Unlike 2013's 2nd-place finish, in the all-around final Fellows finished in 7th place scoring 14.150 on the vault, 13.650 on the uneven bars, 13.250 on the balance beam and 12.500 on the floor exercise for a total of 53.550. Fellows only qualified for the uneven bars final where she tied for 4th place with Raer Theaker with 13.900.

In September, Fellows was named to compete in the 2014 World Artistic Gymnastics Championships in Nanning, China, she was one of the reserve gymnasts for Great Britain.

=== 2015 ===
In March Fellows competed at the British Championships in Liverpool. In the all around competition she scored 13.900 on the vault, 13.450 on the uneven bars, 11.800 on the balance beam and 11.700 on the floor finishing in ninth place and a final score of 50.850. Fellows qualified for the uneven bars final where she placed seventh, she fell for the bars half way through her routine and scored 12.050.

At the end of May, Fellows also competed at the Flanders International Team Challenge in Belgium where she helped the team finish in fifth place contributing a score of 13.250 on the floor exercise. She also shared sixteenth place with Angel Romaeo with a score of 52.900, she scored 13.800 on the vault, 13.350 on the uneven bars, 12.450 on the balance beam and 13.300 on the floor exercise.

On 2 June it was released by British Gymnastics that Fellows was selected to compete at the first ever European Games. Alongside 2014 Commonwealth medallists Kelly Simm and Georgina Hockenhull, as a team of three they are to represent Team GB at the 2015 European Games in Baku, Azerbaijan. The original team selected to compete in Baku were Simm, Rebecca Tunney and Tyesha Mattis but due to injuries, both Tunney and Mattis were withdrawn from the games.

==== European Games ====
On Sunday 14 June Fellows competed in the first day of the team finals and event qualifications at the European Games, the teams only competed on two apparatuses, the vault and uneven bars. Great Britain were the first country to compete on the vault in the whole games where Fellows competed a strong full twisting yurchenko scoring 13.966, she was not nominated to perform a second vault therefore not qualifying for the vault final. In the second rotation Fellows competed on the uneven bars, where she scored 13.700. She was less than tenth of a point away from qualifying from the final making her first reserve, Andreea Iridon of Romania scored 13.733 just nudging Fellows from the final, likewise Tea Ugrin of Italy only scored 13.766 thus exemplifying the closeness of the uneven bars qualification. It is worth noting that rather than the usual 8 finalists qualifying for each event final, in this competition there will only be 6 and only 1 gymnast per country. Overall on day 1, Charlie Fellows contributed a score of 27.666 to Great Britain's half way score of 54.832 and is currently in tenth place in the all-around competition qualification process.

=== 2018 ===
Charlie announced her retirement due to not being picked for the commonwealth games being placed as a reserve, however she was told to keep training in the option of being picked if one of the chosen gymnasts were injured. Fellow team mate Claudia Fragapane was injured and replaced by Lucy Stanhope a first year senior then Olympic bronze medallist and British floor champion Amy Tinkler also tore ankle ligaments competing at the World Cup in Birmingham a week before she was due to leave for Australia.

It was hoped that Fellows would take Amy’s place on the team but this wasn’t the case when it was announced she had been replaced by Taeja James also a first year senior.
