= Lisa Grayson =

British gymnast (born 1972)

Personal information
- Nationality: English
- Born: 27 October 1972 (age 53)

Sport
- Club: Redcar
Medal record
Gymnastics
Representing England
Commonwealth Games
Bronze medal – third place	1990 Auckland	team

Lisa Grayson (born 27 October 1972) is a British female former gymnast. She is the 1989 British champion.

== Gymnastics career ==
Grayson was a member of the Great Britain team that finished 17th at the 1987 World Championships and 15th at the 1989 World Championships. She also won a bronze medal as a member of the England team at the 1990 Commonwealth Games in Auckland, New Zealand.

Grayson was picked as a team reserve for Great Britain at the 1988 Summer Olympics, however when Grayson was selected following an injury she could not be located in time to get the flight to Seoul and subsequently was rendered ineligible to compete (as a later flight would not have given her the required time to recover from jet lag).
