= Paula Thomas (gymnast) =

British gymnast (born 1981)

- Born: 2 August 1981 (age 45)

Gymnastics career
- Discipline: Women's artistic gymnastics
- Country represented: (United Kingdom) Great Britain

Paula Thomas (born 2 August 1981) is a British gymnast. She competed at the 2000 Summer Olympics.
