= Louise Redding =

British artistic gymnast (born 1974)

Personal information
- Nationality: English
- Born: March 21, 1974 (age 52)

Sport
- Club: Shrewsbury
Medal record
Gymnastics
Representing England
Commonwealth Games
Bronze medal – third place	1990 Auckland	team

Louise Redding (born 21 March 1974) is a female former gymnast who competed for England.

== Gymnastics career ==
Redding represented England and won a bronze medal in the team event, at the 1990 Commonwealth Games in Auckland, New Zealand.
