= Bristol Hawks Gymnastics Club =

Gymnastics club in Bristol, England

Coordinates: 51.465769°N 2.563843°W

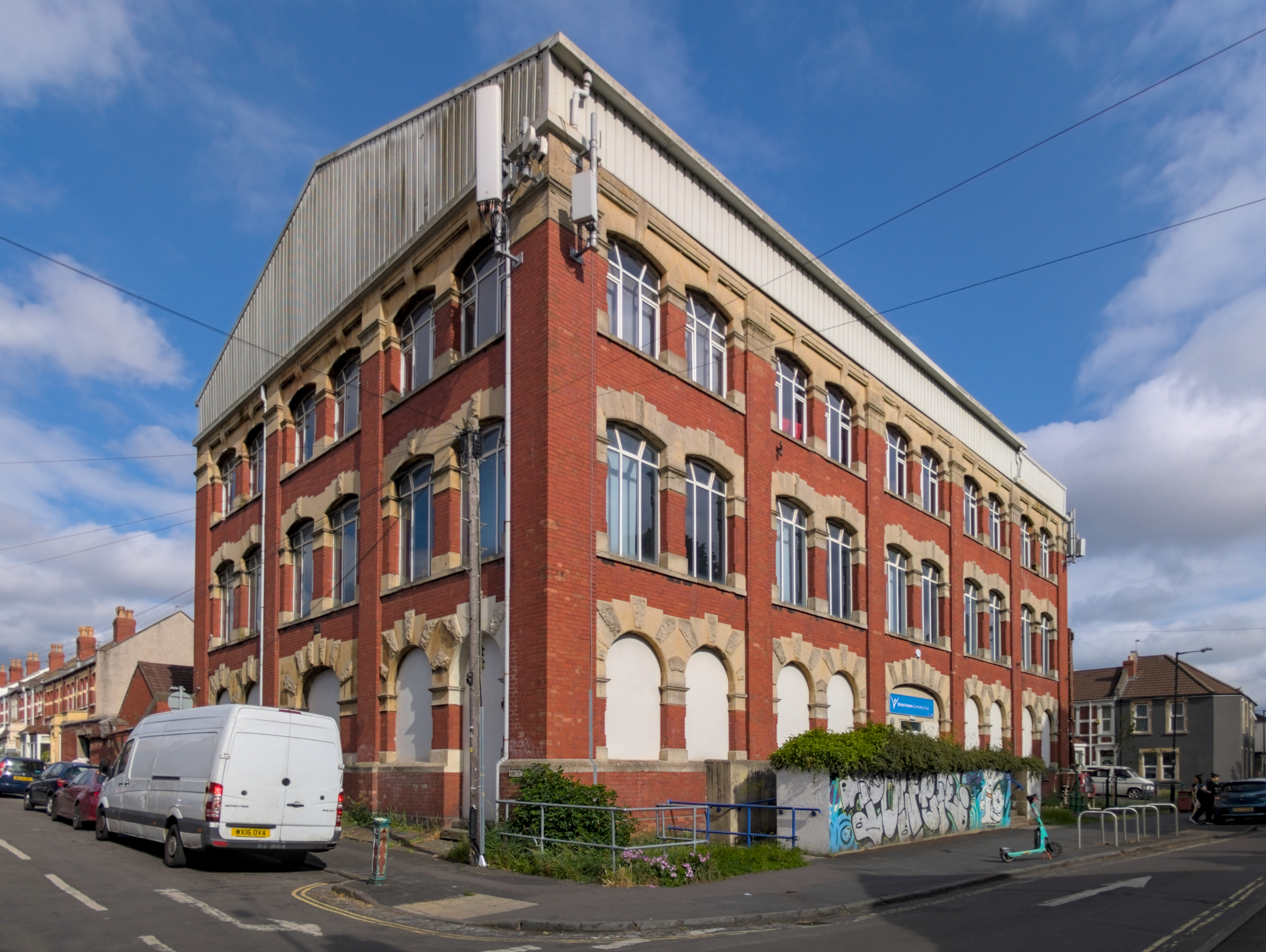
- Bristol Hawks' building at 11 Roman Road, Bristol
- Full name: Bristol Hawks Gymnastics Club
- Sport: Gymnastics
- Founded: 1992
- Location: 11 Roman Road, Easton, Bristol, England
- Website: bristolhawksgymnastics.org

Bristol Hawks Gymnastics Club is a gymnastics centre based in the Easton area of Bristol, England. Known for being the long-time training base of Claudia Fragapane, the club has produced Olympians, Commonwealth champions and European medallists, while also running community and recreational programmes.

== History ==
=== History of the building ===
The club occupies a brick industrial unit on the east side of Roman Road in Lower Easton. A Bristol & Suburban Trades Directory for 1938 lists the address as the wholesale corset factory of Bayer Charles & Company.

By the late 1930s the premises were in the hands of the Bristol Co-operative Society, whose architects lodged several alteration plans with the city council: the fitting of steel shutters (16 February 1938), a reinforced-concrete loading ramp (15 June 1938) and a new road entrance (1 February 1939).

=== Bristol Hawks' origins ===
The club traces its roots to 1979, when coaches Mike and Elaine May opened Hawks Gymnastics alongside the family business in Seaton, Devon. After relocating the family to Bristol in 1987, they bought the disused Co-op warehouse in 1991 and began converting it into a 900 m² gymnastics centre. A week before the scheduled opening the structure was gutted by fire, but community fundraising enabled a complete rebuild, and the venue finally opened as Bristol Hawks Gymnastics Club in August 1992 with Commonwealth vault champion James May performing at the ceremony.

== Facilities and programmes ==
Bristol Hawks operates two gymnasia covering about 900 m² of dedicated gymnastics space. The club is recognised by British Gymnastics as a High Performance Club.

In The Guardian, sports journalist Donald McRae characterised the Roman Road gym as "gritty". Commonwealth Games England and Claudia Fragapane have also credited the club's coaching for her sustained success. A June 2022 feature in The Independent linked Bristol Hawks to the national safeguarding debate, noting that former England gymnast Nicole Pavier began her career at the club.

Situated in one of Bristol's most deprived wards, Bristol Hawks partners with local schools, offers subsidised places, and has hosted filming for BBC, ITV, BT Sport and Sky Sports.
