= Kathleen Williams (gymnast) =

British gymnast (born 1964)

Kathleen Williams MBE
Personal information
- Full name: Kathleen Winnifred Williams
- Nationality: British
- Born: 16 February 1964 (age 62) Manchester, England, United Kingdom

Sport
- Sport: Gymnastics

Kathleen Winnifred Williams MBE OLY (born 16 February 1964) is a British gymnast. She competed in six events at the 1984 Summer Olympics.

== Gymnastics career ==
In 1980, Kathleen was selected as the youngest gymnast to represent Great Britain at the 1980 Summer Olympics, however due to injury had to withdraw.

Four years later, Kathleen was selected for the 1984 Summer Olympics, becoming the first black gymnast to be selected for and compete at an Olympic Games for Great Britain.

== Honours and awards ==
Kathleen was appointed Member of the Order of the British Empire (MBE) in the 2023 New Year Honours for services to Dance.

- Appointed Post-nominal letters OLY granted by the World Olympians Association.
- Awarded with the One Dance UK Lifetime Achievement Award in Dance of the African Diaspora in 2020.
