= Jennifer Gadirova =

British artistic gymnast and Olympic medallist (born 2004)

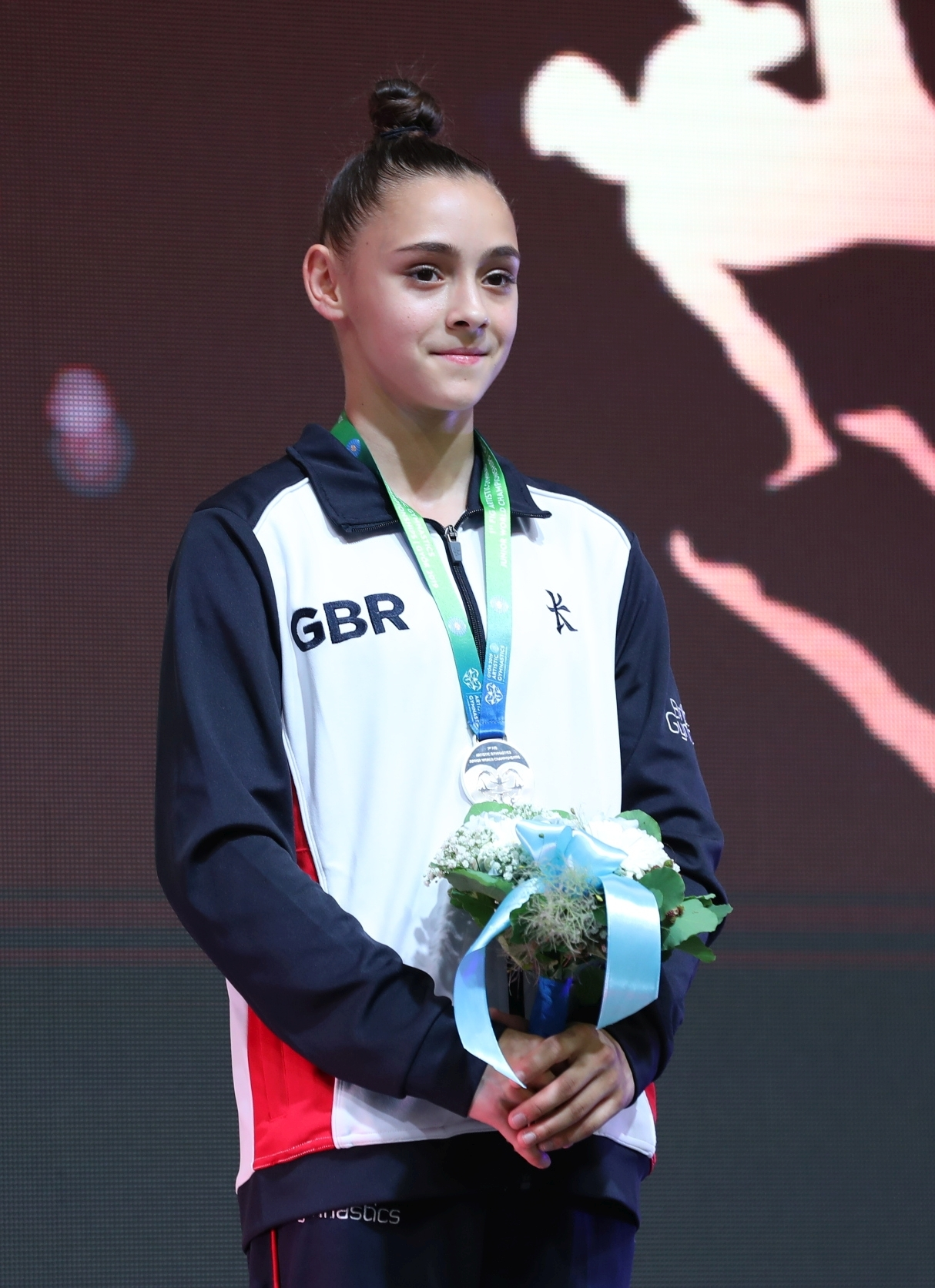
- Gadirova at the 2019 Junior World Championships

Personal information
- Born: 3 October 2004 (age 21) Dublin, Ireland
- Relatives: Jessica Gadirova

Gymnastics career
- Discipline: Women's artistic gymnastics
- Country represented: (United Kingdom) Great Britain; (2019–present)
- Club: Lynx Aylesbury
- Head coaches: Molly Richardson, Joshua Richardson
Medal record
Women's artistic gymnastics
Representing Great Britain
Olympic Games
Bronze medal – third place	2020 Tokyo	Team
World Championships
Silver medal – second place	2022 Liverpool	Team
European Championships
Silver medal – second place	2022 Munich	Team
Junior World Championships
Silver medal – second place	2019 Győr	Vault
FIG World Cup
Event	1st	2nd	3rd
World Challenge Cup	0	0	1
Total	0	0	1

Jennifer Gadirova (born 3 October 2004) is an English artistic gymnast of Irish birth and Azerbaijani descent, representing Great Britain internationally. She represented Great Britain at the 2020 Summer Olympics and won a bronze medal in the team event, and was part of the Great Britain team to win silver, their best ever result, in the team event at the 2022 World Artistic Gymnastics Championships and the same medal at the 2022 European Championships. Competing at the 2019 Junior World Championships, she won a silver medal in the vault final.

Gadirova is the twin sister and teammate of the 2022 World Champion on floor exercise, Jessica Gadirova.

== Personal life ==
Gadirova and her identical twin sister Jessica were born in Dublin, Ireland, and are of Azerbaijani background. Their father, Natig Gadirov, is a citizen of Azerbaijan and their mother is Azerbaijani as well. Gadirova was born in Dublin while her parents worked there for a few months; as a result she has Azeri, Irish and British citizenships. Her paternal grandparents live in Baku: grandmother is a retired paediatrician, and grandfather is a professor in physics and mathematics. Gadirova and her sister began gymnastics at six years old because their mother wanted them to have an outlet for their energy.

== Junior gymnastics career ==
=== Espoir: 2016 ===
Gadirova competed at the 2016 English Championships, where she placed first on floor exercise, winning the Christine Bowker Artistry Trophy, and fourth in the all-around.

=== Junior: 2018–19 ===
Gadirova competed at the 2018 English Championships in February where she placed twelfth. The following month she competed at the British Championships, where she placed fifth on floor exercise, sixth on vault, and nineteenth in the all-around. She ended the season competing at the British Team Championships, where she placed third in the junior non-squad all-around.

In March 2019, Gadirova competed at the English Championships, where she placed third behind Ondine Achampong and Halle Hilton. Later that month she competed at the British Championships where she placed fifth in the all-around and won gold on floor exercise, silver on vault, behind Annie Young, and bronze on uneven bars, behind Achampong and Young.

Gadirova competed at the inaugural Junior World Championships in Győr, Hungary alongside her twin sister Jessica and Alia Leat. During the team final the trio finished in sixth place and individually Gadirova finished seventh in the all-around. During event finals Gadirova won silver on vault with a score of 14.133 behind American Kayla DiCello. Additionally she finished fourth on floor exercise (13.266) and sixth on balance beam (13.133). Gadirova was the first British gymnast to win a medal at the Junior World Championships.

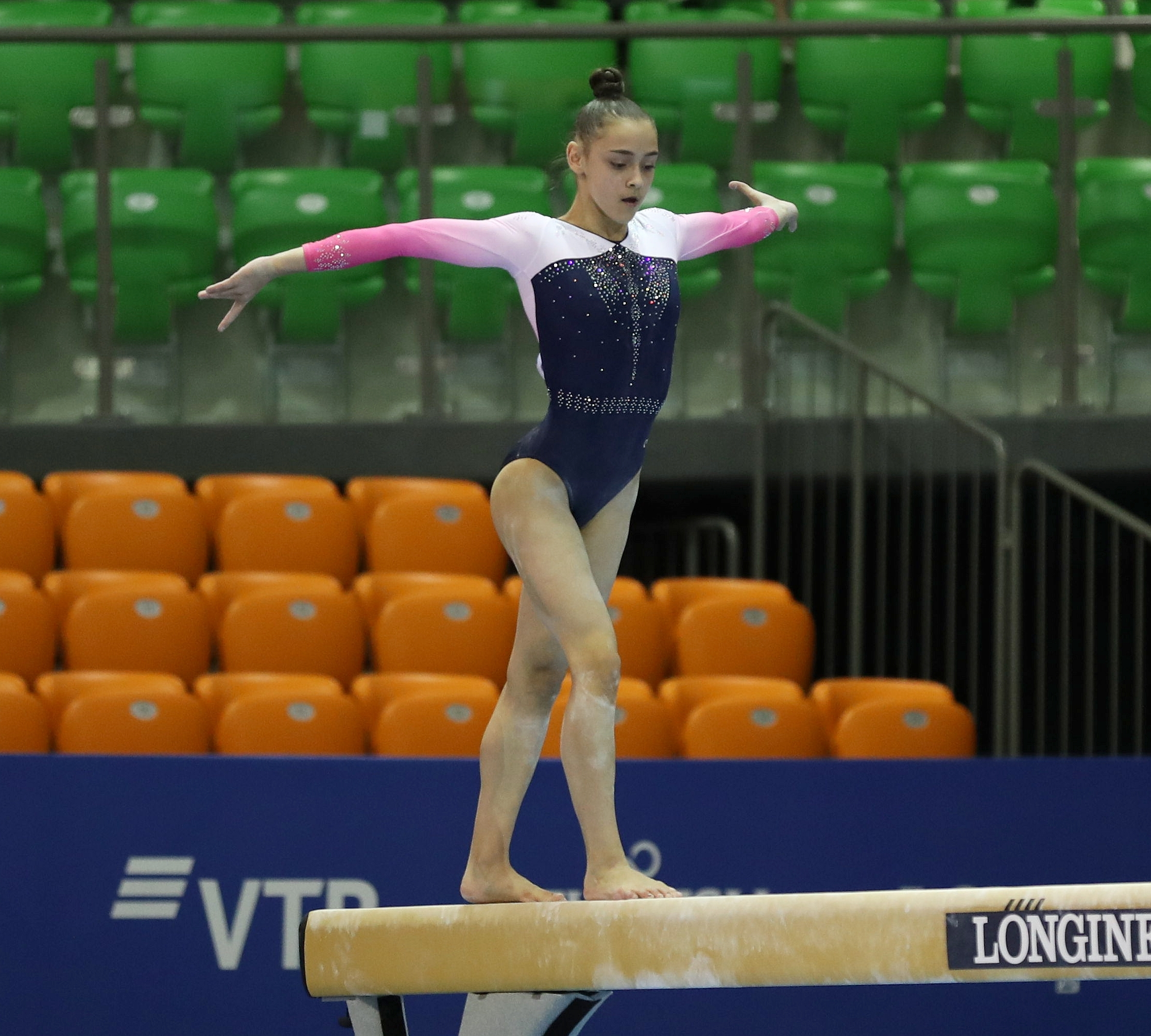
Team / All-Around Final

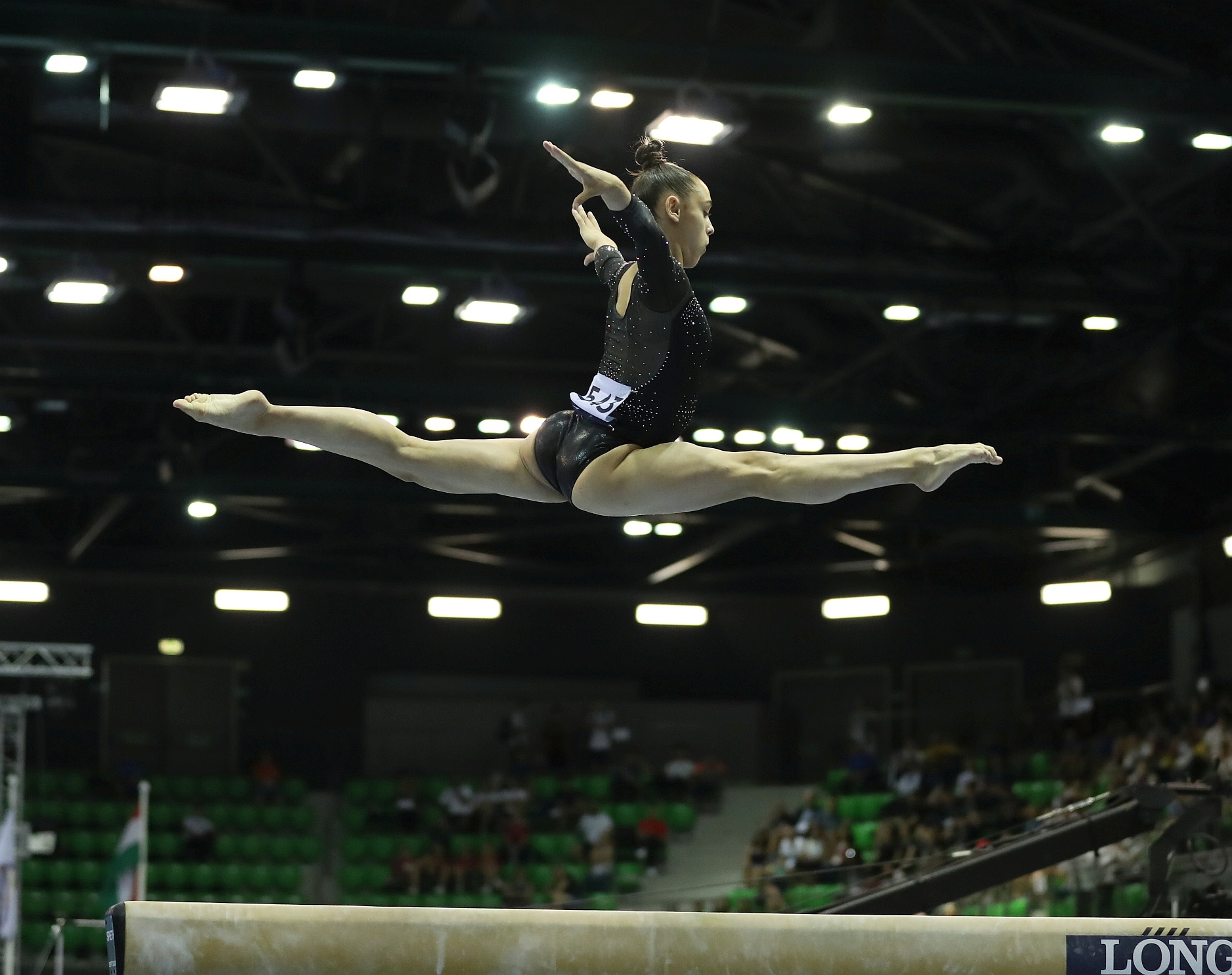
Balance Beam Final

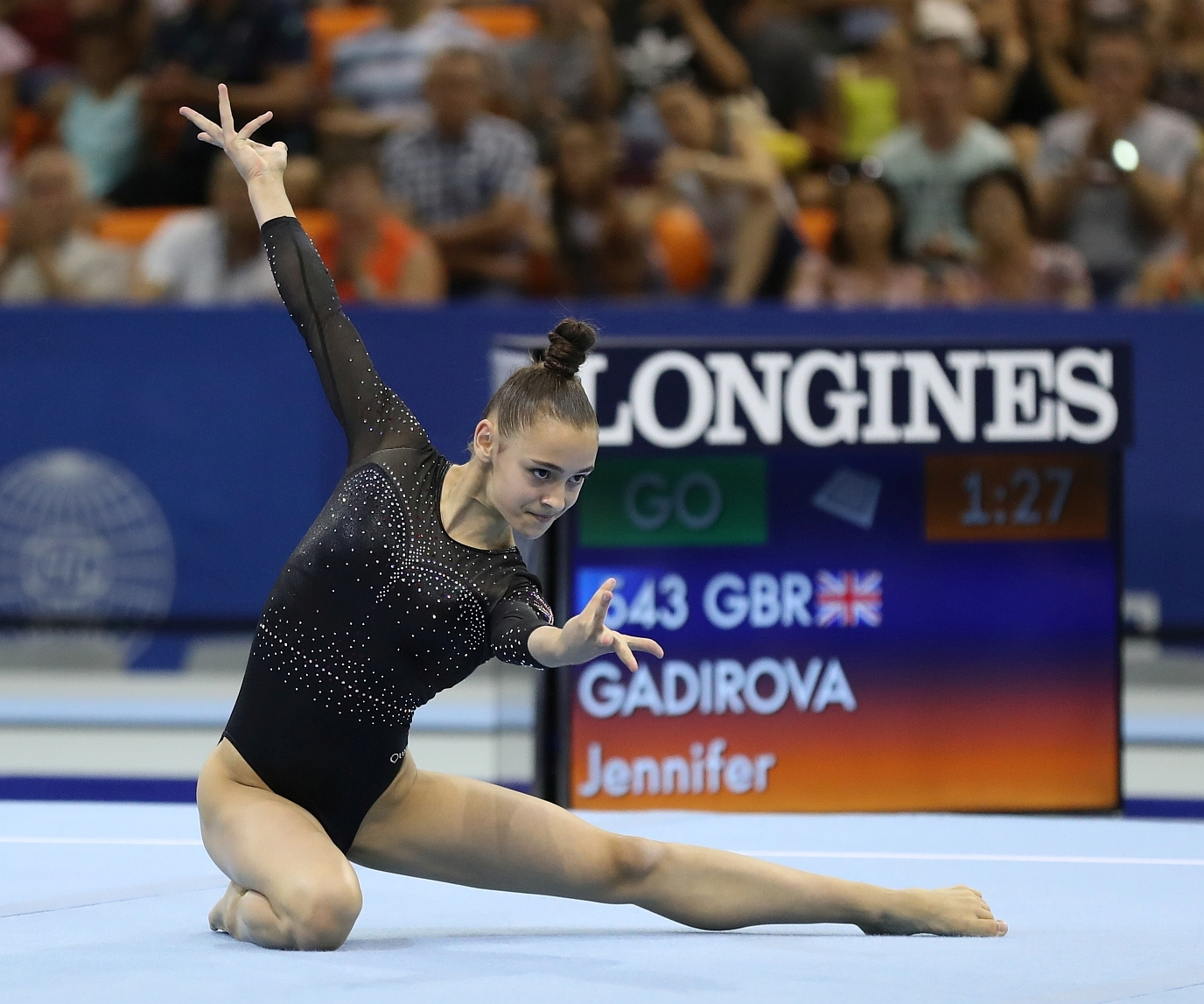
Floor Exercise Final

Gadirova at the 2019 Junior World Championships

In July Gadirova competed at the Sainté Gym Cup, where she helped Great Britain win team gold. In September she competed at the 2019 Women's Artistic Adrian Stan British Teams Championships, finishing second in the junior all-around, after her sister. In November she competed at the Massilia Cup in France, winning gold on vault and silver on floor.

== Senior gymnastics career ==
=== 2020 ===
In 2020 Gadirova became age-eligible for senior level competition; her senior debut was the 2020 American Cup where she replaced the injured Amelie Morgan. She placed fourth behind Morgan Hurd, Kayla DiCello (both from the United States), and Hitomi Hatakeda of Japan. While there, she received the highest score on floor exercise (13.700) and vault (14.566), second highest on balance beam (13.933), and tenth highest on uneven bars.

=== 2021 ===
In April Gadirova was selected to represent Great Britain at the 2021 European Championships alongside her twin sister Jessica, Alice Kinsella, and Amelie Morgan. Later that month she withdrew as a precaution due to a minor injury and was replaced by Phoebe Jakubczyk.

On 7 June, Gadirova was selected to represent Great Britain at the 2020 Summer Olympics, alongside her twin sister Jessica, Alice Kinsella, and Amelie Morgan. At the Olympic Games, Gadirova qualified for the all-around final; additionally Great Britain qualified for the team final. During the team final, Gadirova performed on vault, balance beam, and floor exercise, hitting all of her routines and helping Great Britain win the bronze medal, their first Olympic team medal in 93 years. During the all-around final, Gadirova had some minor issues on the uneven bars but still finished thirteenth place overall. Originally Gadirova was the first reserve for the floor exercise final but she was able to compete after Simone Biles withdrew. During the floor exercise event final, Gadirova finished in seventh place.

In December 2021 Gadirova became a brand ambassador for gymnastics leotard manufacturer Milano Pro-Sport.

=== 2022 ===
In March Gadirova competed at the 2022 English Championships where she placed third on bars and second on floor. Later that month she competed at the British Championships in Liverpool where she won bronze in the all-around with a score of 52.350, placing behind her Aylesbury teammates Jessica Gadirova and Ondine Achampong. She then went on to win bronze on the uneven bars, gold on balance beam and silver on floor exercise. In July Gadirova was selected to compete at the 2022 European Championships alongside her sister Jessica, Achampong, Georgia-Mae Fenton, and Alice Kinsella. While there she contributed scores on balance beam and floor exercise towards Great Britain's second-place finish. During event finals Gadirova placed fifth on floor exercise.

In September Gadirova competed at the Paris World Challenge Cup. She qualified to the balance beam and floor exercise finals. She won bronze on floor exercise behind Americans Jordan Chiles and Shilese Jones and placed fourth on balance beam. Later that month Gadirova was named to the team to compete at the 2022 World Championships, once again alongside her twin sister Jessica, Achampong, Kinsella, and Fenton. Gadirova qualified to the floor exercise final and helped Great Britain qualify to the team final. During the team final Gadirova competed on floor exercise, helping Great Britain win the silver medal and achieve their highest placement at a World Championships.

=== 2023–2026 ===
Gadirova competed at the 2023 British Championships where she only competed on the balance beam, placing twelfth with a score of 11.950. It was later revealed that Gadirova was injured and would miss the 2023 European Championships. She underwent surgery on her ankle in January 2024. She was unable to recover in time for the 2024 Olympic Games.

In February 2025, Gadirova announced that she had suffered an ACL injury during a training camp.

Gadirova made her return to competition following her ACL injury in February 2026 at the Welsh Championships; she only competed on balance beam and uneven bars.

== Selected competitive skills ==
Apparatus	Name	Description	Difficulty (Note: Valid for the 2017–2020 Code of Points)	Performed
Vault	Baitova	Yurchenko entry, laid out salto backwards with two twists	5.4	2020
Uneven bars	Piked Jaeger	Reverse grip swing to piked salto forwards to catch high bar	E	2020
Uneven bars	Van Leeuwen	Toe-On Shaposhnikova transition with ½ twist to high bar	E	2020
Balance beam	Switch Ring	Switch Leap to Ring Position (180° split with raised back leg)	E	2020
Balance beam	Double pike	Dismount: Double piked salto backwards	E	2022
Balance beam	Full-in	Dismount: Full-twisting (1/1) double tucked salto backwards	G	2020
Floor exercise	Mukhina	Full-twisting (1/1) double tucked salto backwards	E	2022
Floor exercise	Double Layout	Double laid out salto backwards	F	2021–22
Floor exercise	Chusovitina	Full-twisting (1/1) double laid out salto backwards	H	2021
Floor exercise	Silivas	Double-twisting (2/1) double tucked salto backwards	H	2020

== Competitive history ==
Competitive history of Jennifer Gadirova at the junior level
Year	Event	Team	AA	VT	UB	BB	FX
2016	English Championships		4			4	1st place, gold medalist(s)
2018	English Championships		12				
2018	British Championships		19	6			5
2018	British Team Championships	3rd place, bronze medalist(s)	3rd place, bronze medalist(s)				
2019	English Championships		3rd place, bronze medalist(s)				
2019	British Championships		5	2nd place, silver medalist(s)	3rd place, bronze medalist(s)		1st place, gold medalist(s)
2019	FIT Challenge	4	11				
2019	Junior World Championships	6	7	2nd place, silver medalist(s)		6	4
2019	Sainté Gym Cup	1st place, gold medalist(s)	11				
2019	British Team Championships	1st place, gold medalist(s)	2nd place, silver medalist(s)				
2019	Elite Gym Massilia		9	1st place, gold medalist(s)			2nd place, silver medalist(s)

Competitive history of Jennifer Gadirova at the senior level
Year	Event	Team	AA	VT	UB	BB	FX
2020	American Cup		4				
2021
2021	Olympic Games	3rd place, bronze medalist(s)	13				7
2022	English Championships				3rd place, bronze medalist(s)	6	2nd place, silver medalist(s)
2022	British Championships		3rd place, bronze medalist(s)		3rd place, bronze medalist(s)	1st place, gold medalist(s)	2nd place, silver medalist(s)
2022	European Championships	2nd place, silver medalist(s)					5
2022	Paris Challenge Cup					4	3rd place, bronze medalist(s)
2022	World Championships	2nd place, silver medalist(s)					7
2023	British Championships					12	
