= Francis Stone =

England international rugby union player

- Born: Francis Le Strange Stone; 14 June 1886 Lewisham, England
- Died: 7 October 1938 (aged 52) London, England
- School: Harrow School
- Notable relative(s): Walter Stone, brother

Rugby union career
- Position: Number 8
Amateur team(s)
| Years | Team | Apps | (Points) |
- Blackheath F.C.
| – | Barbarian F.C. | | |
| – | London Counties | | |
International career
| Years | Team | Apps | (Points) |
| 1914 | England | 1 | (0) |

Francis Le strange Stone MC (14 June 1886 – 7 October 1938) was an English international rugby union forward who played club rugby for Blackheath and county rugby for London Counties.

== Life ==
He was born in Lewisham, in 1886, to Edward Stone, a solicitor, and his wife Emily Francis Miéville, daughter of Andrew Amédée Miéville and his wife Emily Dew, daughter of Tomkyns Dew. He was the sixth of ten siblings, the youngest of whom was Walter Napleton Stone VC. He was christened at the Church of the Ascension in Blackheath, London on 21 July.

Stone was educated at Harrow School, leaving in 1904 and working as a solicitor. He fought in the British Army during the First World War, joining the 3rd Hussars in 1914, and being awarded the Military Cross serving with them in 1917.

== Rugby ==
Stone played international rugby for England on just one occasion but also represented the Barbarians.
