= Rowena Roberts =

British artistic gymnast

Rowena Jane Roberts (born 14 May 1977, Kingston, Surrey, Great Britain) is a retired British artistic gymnast & Olympian.

== Career ==
Roberts began gymnastics at the age of four at the Elmbridge Leisure Centre and further trained at the Heathrow Gymnastics Club and Spelthorne School of Gymnastics later in her career.

Roberts made her international debut at the age of 12 in 1989 and travelled to the 1990 European Women's Artistic Gymnastics Championships as a team reserve after placing second in the Junior British Championships all-round, and taking the Junior British beam title.

In 1991, Roberts took the Senior British Beam title and placed sixth in the all-round competition. Roberts represented Great Britain in the 1991 World Artistic Gymnastics Championships. In Indianapolis, USA.

In 1992 Roberts became all around British gymnastics champion and represented Great Britain at the 1992 European Women's Artistic Gymnastics Championships where she placed the highest of British women’s gymnasts in Europe at 19th. This was the highest placing ever by a British woman at that time.

Later that year she was one of two gymnasts selected to represent Great Britain at the Olympic games. She was the youngest member of the Great Britain Olympic Team for the Barcelona Olympic Games.

Roberts remains the youngest ever British all around gymnastics champion and also the youngest female gymnast to have represented Great Britain at the Olympic Games at the age of 15 years and 73 days. She is also one of Great Britain’s youngest Olympians of all time. Roberts holds the title of Master Gymnast from British Gymnastics.

Roberts appeared numerous times on TV during live broadcasts of various gymnastics championships. She also appeared on Blue Peter twice and in 1992 was the recipient of the Blue Peter Gold Badge.

Roberts retired from competitive gymnastics at the age of 16 and started a commercial career in freight forwarding, logistics, technology and supply chain. She is currently Vice President Global Product Development at EV Cargo.

She is also the founder and head coach of gymnastics club ‘Gympickles’ based in SW London. Gympickles is a recreational club with an ethos focused on fun and inclusiveness for children of all abilities.

== Personal life ==
Roberts married businessman, Clyde Buntrock on 12 May 2018 and changed her name to Rowena Buntrock. Mr Buntrock is CEO at the Global Aviation Company AJW Group as well as Founder and Joint Managing Director of Scarbrow Morgan.
