= Margo Morgan =

British gymnast (1929–2001)

Personal information
- Nationality: British
- Born: 29 December 1929; Swansea, Wales
- Died: November 2001 (aged 71); Swansea, Wales

Sport
- Sport: Gymnastics

Margo Morgan (29 December 1929 – November 2001) was a British gymnast. She competed in seven events at the 1952 Summer Olympics. Morgan died in Swansea in November 2001, at the age of 71.
