= Sarah Mercer (gymnast) =

British gymnast (born 1974)

Personal information
- Nationality: British
- Born: 30 December 1974 (age 50); Durban, South Africa

Sport
- Sport: Gymnastics

Sarah Mercer (born 30 December 1974) is a British gymnast. She competed at the 1992 Summer Olympics.
