= Dorothy Summers (gymnast) =

British gymnast (born 1941)

Personal information
- Nationality: British
- Born: 29 September 1941 (age 83); Cardiff, Wales

Sport
- Sport: Gymnastics

Dorothy Summers (born September 29, 1941) is a British gymnast. She competed in six events at the 1960 Summer Olympics.
