= Rebecca Tunney =

British artistic gymnast

- Full name: Rebecca Naomi Tunney
- Nickname: Twiggy
- Born: 26 October 1996 (age 30) Ashton-under-Lyne, England, United Kingdom
- Height: 1.47 m (4 ft 10 in)

Gymnastics career
- Discipline: Women's artistic gymnastics
- Country represented: Great Britain England
- Club: City of Liverpool
- Head coach: Claire Duffy
- Retired: 6 April 2017
Medal record
Representing Great Britain
European Championships
Silver medal – second place	2014 Sofia	Team
Representing England
Commonwealth Youth Games
Gold medal – first place	2011 Isle of Man	Team
Gold medal – first place	2011 Isle of Man	Vault
Bronze medal – third place	2011 Isle of Man	Floor Exercise

Rebecca Naomi Tunney (born 26 October 1996) is a British retired artistic gymnast who competed at the 2012 Summer Olympics.

== Personal information ==
Tunney took ballet from a young age but gave it up at five years old to focus on gymnastics. She moved to the City of Liverpool gymnastics club when she was ten years old to train with coach Claire Duffy. Duffy said, "She was tiny, quite scruffy and overwhelmed by the environment, but keen and excited to get in there and give it a go. When she first won a medal, you could see how she loved to train to win. She'd had a taste of medals and that was exactly what she wanted to do: she wanted to be a champion."

Tunney formerly attended Droylsden Academy Secondary School. She said, "I've not been to school for quite a long time but they know why I'm away and where I'm going, they're supportive about everything and I sometimes take work with me."

After formerly living in Manchester it was felt that, with the 2016 Summer Olympics in mind, she should be based nearer to her gym. In September 2012 she moved to live in Liverpool with the family of her coach. She also switched schools, leaving Droylsden to join The Belvedere Academy. In an interview with The Guardian, Tunney said, "After school I just walk down (to the City of Liverpool club) – it's only 10 minutes."

== Junior career ==
=== 2010 ===
At the end of April, Tunney competed at the 2010 European Women's Artistic Gymnastics Championships in Birmingham, United Kingdom. She contributed an all around score of 50.600 toward the British team's fifth-place finish.

In July, Tunney competed at the British Championships in Guildford, United Kingdom. She placed second in the all around competition with a score of 53.900. In event finals, she placed first on uneven bars scoring 13.750 and fifth on floor scoring 12.850. Tunney said, "I'm really happy. I got a bit nervous at times but I wanted to prove myself again after the Europeans and I think I've done that today."

=== 2011 ===
In May, Tunney competed at the British Teams competition. She contributed an all around score of 50.450 to help City of Liverpool win first place.

In July, Tunney competed at the British Championships in Liverpool, United Kingdom. She won the all around competition with a score of 54.850 and in event finals she placed first on uneven bars scoring 13.450, sixth on balance beam scoring 12.850, and first on floor scoring 13.900. "I wasn't expecting to win at all so I'm really pleased," Tunney said. "I've competed on podiums before and always find it such great experience and it was great having the support of my club here in its hometown. All the younger gymnasts from my club were able to watch and were cheering me on it was great."

In September, Tunney competed for England at the Commonwealth Youth Games in the Isle of Man. She helped the English team place first and individually placed sixth in the all around final with a score of 50.30. In event finals, she placed first on vault scoring 13.350, fifth on uneven bars scoring 12.300, and third on floor scoring 13.650.

== Senior career ==
=== 2012 ===
In January, Tunney competed at the London Prepares series where she placed nineteenth all around with a score of 54.399. Also, she placed sixth in the uneven bars event finals with a score of 14.266. Tunney said, "The atmosphere at the test event was really good. The reactions you got from the home crowd after routines were incredible. My mum went to the test event, and my grandma and grandpa went. They always say they're proud but I don't take it in – it's just me doing gymnastics. They obviously see it in a different way, as a major thing."

In March, Tunney placed eighth at the American Cup in New York, United States with an all around score of 52.132.

In May, Tunney competed at the 2012 European Women's Artistic Gymnastics Championships in Brussels, Belgium. After qualifications, Tunney said, "I competed at the 2010 junior Euros but that was nothing like here, with a full crowd, it was really great I enjoyed every minute of it. I've been working on the new vault, the Yurchenko double twist and it's paying off, I was really happy with that today." In team finals, she competed on vault, uneven bars, and floor for the British team which placed fourth. "I had good performances all round and I'm really happy with how the team have done. I was nervous coming into this event but think I've coped really well. To make no mistakes in all my routines so far is brilliant, my floor has been solid all week so I'm looking forward to the final tomorrow." In event finals, she finished fifth on floor with a score of 13.800.

At the end of May, Tunney participated in the British Teams competition which acted as the first Olympic trial. She helped her club, City of Liverpool, win first place with the highest all around score of 56.550. In event finals, she placed second on vault scoring 14.750, first on uneven bars scoring 14.700, fifth on balance beam scoring 13.600, and second on floor scoring 13.500.

At the beginning of June, Tunney competed at an international friendly with gymnasts from Finland and Spain in Ipswich, United Kingdom which was also the second Olympic trial. She won the all around competition with a score of 56.500.

At the end of June, Tunney competed at the British Championships in Liverpool, United Kingdom. This is the third and final Olympic Trial to decide the gymnasts that will represent the United Kingdom at the Olympics. She won the all around competition with a score of 56.750. She said, "It’s totally unexpected to win. The main focus with it being the Olympic trial was to stay clean and I thought if I did that I could get maybe in the top 5 but to win is incredible. The trials have all gone really well for me so it’s now just up to the selectors to decide what works best for the Olympics. The first year as a senior couldn’t have gone better really and I’m really enjoying competed in front of big crowds. Having won the junior title last year and moved straight up to win seniors is brilliant, I’m very happy." In event finals, she placed second on uneven bars scoring 14.350, fifth on balance beam scoring 13.550, and fourth on floor scoring 13.500.

At the beginning of July, Tunney was selected to compete for the United Kingdom at the 2012 Summer Olympics, making her the youngest athlete for Team GB at London 2012. After arriving in London, she said, “It’s been overwhelming, definitely, I wasn’t expecting it to be like this. I knew it was going to be big but this was more than I expected. But I’ve got all my team-mates to settle me down and talk me through things. Being in the village has been the best bit – how big it is, and seeing other athletes, great athletes, walking around. The others have tried to calm me down.”

==== London Olympics ====
At the end of July, Tunney competed at the 2012 Summer Olympics in London, England where she was Team GB's youngest athlete at the games, aged 15. She helped the British team qualify in fifth place and individually she qualified to the all around final with a score of 56.391. In the team final, Tunney contributed scores of 14.866 on vault and 14.766 on uneven bars toward the British team's sixth-place finish. She said, "First Olympic Games and we're getting into the team final and finishing sixth, you can't ask for anything bigger. It was inspiring to see the men get a medal. They did their best yesterday and so did we, even though we didn't medal." In the all around final, Tunney placed thirteenth with a score of 56.932. She said, "It's been an amazing experience here in London; the best week of my life. To compete at a home Games in front of this crowd has been incredible. To be the youngest in Team GB I'm very proud and I've learnt so much. The rest of the Games I'm looking forward to the atmosphere and cheering on Team GB."

=== 2015 ===
On 23 April, it was announced by the British Olympic Association that Tunney was to represent Great Britain at the first ever European Games alongside 2014 Commonwealth champion Kelly Simm and senior newcomer Tyesha Mattis, although due to perpetual injuries with Tunney and a recent operation with Mattis they were both withdrawn from the competition and replaced by double 2014 Commonwealth bronze medalist Georgina Hockenhull and 2014 World Championships reserve athlete Charlie Fellows.

=== 2016 ===
Tunney was named alternate for the 2016 Rio Olympics along with Kelly Simm and Gabby Jupp.

=== 2017 ===
On 6 April, Tunney announced that she had retired from competitive international gymnastics to concentrate on university work and potentially coaching in the future.
