= Natalie Davies =

British gymnast (born 1966)

Personal information
- Nationality: British
- Born: 1 December 1966 (age 58); Farnborough, England

Sport
- Sport: Gymnastics

Natalie Davies (born 1 December 1966) is a British gymnast. She competed in six events at the 1984 Summer Olympics.
