= Sally Larner =

British gymnast (born 1969)

Personal information
- Nationality: British
- Born: 1 March 1969 (age 56); Bromsgrove, England

Sport
- Sport: Gymnastics

Sally Larner (born 1 March 1969) is a British gymnast. She competed in six events at the 1984 Summer Olympics.
