= Jill Pollard =

British gymnast (born 1935)

Personal information
- Nationality: British
- Born: 21 July 1935 (age 89); Bradford, England

Sport
- Sport: Gymnastics

Jill Pollard (born 21 July 1935) is a British gymnast. She competed in six events at the 1960 Summer Olympics.
