= Vanessa Hobbs =

British artistic gymnast (born 1987)

- Born: 4 May 1987 (age 39) Portsmouth, United Kingdom

Gymnastics career
- Discipline: Women's artistic gymnastics
- Country represented: Great Britain; (2004)

Vanessa Hobbs (born 4 May 1987) is a British female artistic gymnast, representing her nation at international competitions.

She participated at the 2004 Summer Olympics, and the 2003 World Artistic Gymnastics Championships.
