= Pamela Hopkins =

British gymnast (born 1953)

Personal information
- Nationality: British
- Born: 18 September 1953 (age 72) Cardiff, Wales

Sport
- Sport: Gymnastics

Pamela Jean Hopkins (later Hardwicke; born 18 September 1953) is a British gymnast. She competed at the 1972 Summer Olympics, as part of the GB team that finished 18th. She finished 114th in the individual event. She was a member of the Penarth gymnastics club and was trained by Gwynedd Lingard.
