= Karen Kennedy =

British gymnast (born 1966)

Personal information
- Nationality: British
- Born: 4 December 1966 (age 58); Farnham, England

Sport
- Sport: Gymnastics

Karen Kennedy (born 4 December 1966) is a British gymnast. She competed in five events at the 1988 Summer Olympics.
