= Pamela Hutchinson =

British gymnast (born 1953)

Personal information
- Nationality: British
- Born: 7 December 1953 (age 71)

Sport
- Sport: Gymnastics

Pamela Hutchinson (born 7 December 1953) is a British gymnast. She competed at the 1972 Summer Olympics.
