= Karen Hargate =

British gymnast (born 1972)

Personal information
- Born: 14 October 1972 (age 52); St Andrews, Scotland

Sport
- Sport: Gymnastics

Karen Hargate (born 14 October 1972) is a British gymnast. She competed in five events at the 1988 Summer Olympics. She was the youngest participant during the 1988 games. Hargate was awarded a Master Gymnasts, Women's Artistic honorary award by British Gymnastics.
