= Cissy Davies =

British gymnast (1932–2015)

Personal information
- Nationality: British
- Born: 1 December 1932 Swansea, Wales
- Died: 4 October 2015 (aged 82)

Sport
- Sport: Gymnastics

Cissy Davies (1 December 1932 – 4 October 2015) was a British gymnast. She competed at the 1948 Summer Olympics and the 1952 Summer Olympics.
