= Cherrelle Fennell =

British gymnast (born 1986)

Cherelle Fennell
- Born: 2 November 1986 (age 39)

Gymnastics career
- Discipline: Women's artistic gymnastics
- Country represented: Great Britain (2004)

Cherrelle Fennell (born 2 November 1986) is a British female artistic gymnast, representing her nation at international competitions.

She participated at the 2004 Summer Olympics.
