= Elaine Willett =

British gymnast (born 1956)

Personal information
- Nationality: British
- Born: 8 January 1956 (age 69); Lewisham, England

Sport
- Sport: Gymnastics

Elaine Willett (born 8 January 1956) is a British gymnast. She competed at the 1972 Summer Olympics.
