= Hayley Price =

British gymnast

Hayley Price is a British gymnast. She was born on 13 April 1966 in Wolverhampton, Staffordshire, England. She represented the United Kingdom in the 1984 Summer Olympics.

== Early life ==
She lived at 152 Wood End Road in Wednesfield, attending Wood End primary school, and Wednesfield High School.
