= Irene Hirst =

British gymnast (1930–2000)

Personal information
- Nationality: British
- Born: 11 July 1930; Bierley, England
- Died: 1 July 2000 (aged 69)

Sport
- Sport: Gymnastics

Irene Hirst (11 July 1930 – 1 July 2000) was a British gymnast. She competed at the 1948 Summer Olympics and the 1952 Summer Olympics.
