= Barbara Alred =

British gymnast (1953–1995)

Personal information
- Nationality: British
- Born: 31 October 1953; Bradford, England
- Died: December 1995; Leeds, England

Sport
- Sport: Gymnastics

Barbara Alred (31 October 1953 – December 1995) was a British gymnast. She competed at the 1972 Summer Olympics. Alred represented Saltaire Ladies Gymnastic Club in Shipley, West Yorkshire. In 1971, Alred won the All England Schoolgirls title. In 1972, she became a National Champion, resulting in her selection for the Olympics. She died of breast cancer in 1995.
