= Yvonne Arnold =

British gymnastics coach (born 1953)

Yvonne Mugridge
- Born: 27 April 1953 (age 73) Sidcup, London

Gymnastics career
- Discipline: Women's artistic gymnastics
- Country represented: Great Britain
- Club: Ladywell Gymnastics Club London

Yvonne Daphne Mugridge Arnold OBE (born 27 April 1953) is a British gymnastics coach and retired artistic gymnast. She was national champion in 1972 and represented Great Britain at the 1972 Olympic Games in Munich.

She and her husband, coach Len Arnold, opened the Europa Gymnastics Centre in 1992 in Erith. In 1999, as the club faced financial difficulties, the Arnolds sold their home and lived at the club for 13 years to keep it from closing. The club later received funding to build a new facility in Crayford, which opened as an Olympic training centre in 2012.

The Arnolds were named Officers of the Order of the British Empire in the 2012 Birthday Honours for their services to gymnastics. In 2016, they received the Special Achievement Award from the National Lottery.
