= Denise Jones (gymnast) =

British gymnast (born 1962)

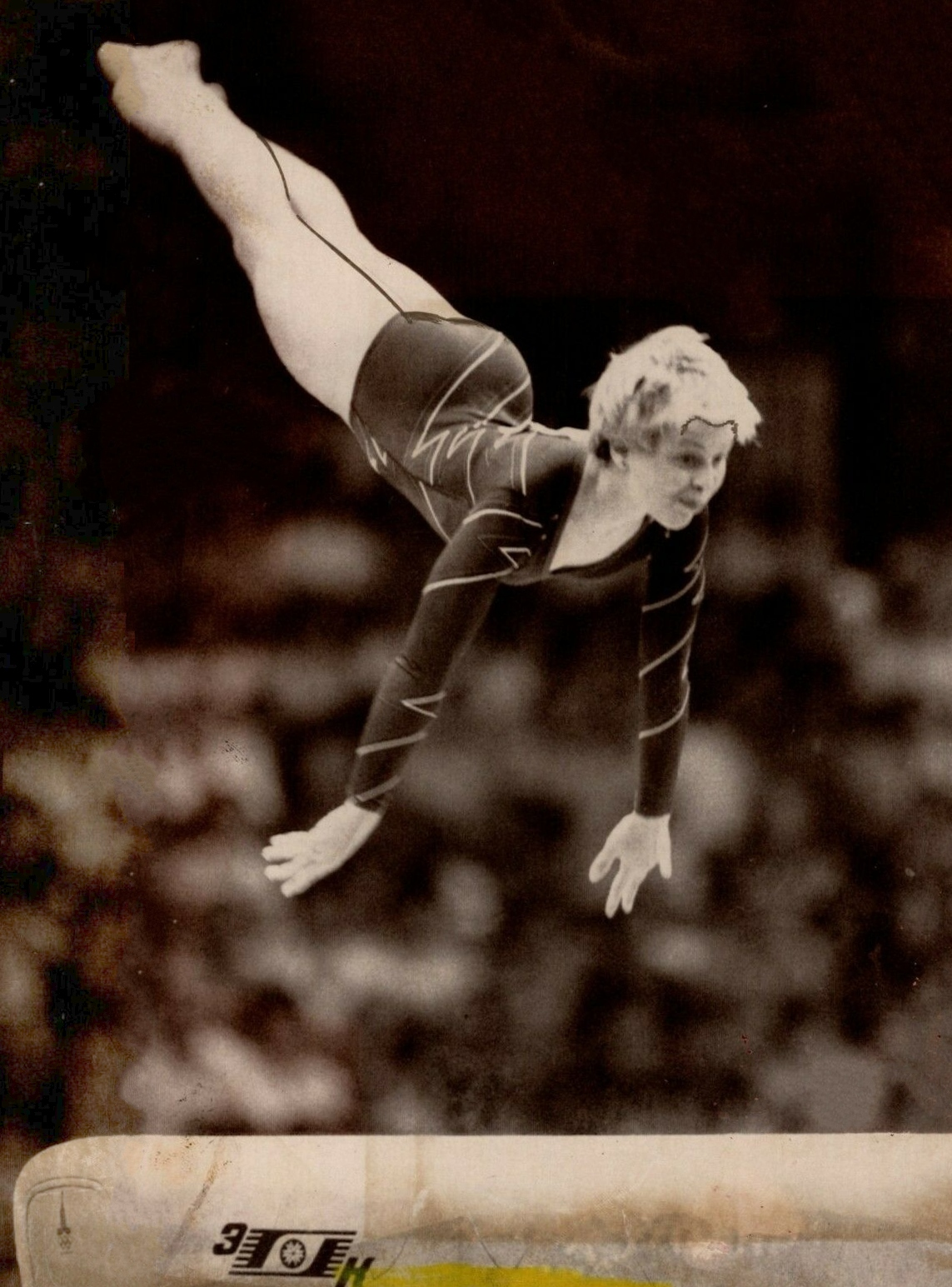
- Jones at the 1980 Olympics

Personal information
- Nationality: British
- Born: 11 December 1962 (age 62)
- Height: 147 cm (4 ft 10 in)
- Weight: 41 kg (90 lb)

Sport
- Sport: Artistic gymnastics
- Club: Huddersfield Gym Club

Denise Jones (born 11 December 1962) is a British gymnast. She competed in five individual events at the 1980 Summer Olympics with the best result of 23rd place all-around.
