= Lisa Young (gymnast) =

British gymnast (born 1966)

Personal information
- Born: 3 January 1966 (age 60) Shropshire, England
- Education: Bangor University, Louisiana State University

Sport
- Sport: Gymnastics
- University team: Louisiana State University

Lisa Young (born 3 January 1966) is a British gymnast. She competed in six events at the 1984 Summer Olympics. Young attended Louisiana State University and competed for their Gymnastics team in 1987. Young helped LSU to a 7th place finish at the 1987 NCAA Gymnastics Championships and was a letter winner for the 1987 season.

== Competitive history ==
Year	Event	Team	AA	VT	UB	BB	FX
1981	British Championships		2nd place, silver medalist(s)				
1981	European Championships		29				
1981	World Championships	12					
1983	British Championships		3rd place, bronze medalist(s)				
1983	World Championships	17					
1984	British Championships		5				
1984	Olympic Games	7					
1985	European Championships		45				
1985	World Championships	16					
