= List of victims of Nazism =

This is a list of victims of Nazism who were noted for their achievements. Many on the lists below were of Jewish and Polish origin, although Soviet POWs, Jehovah's Witnesses, Serbs, Catholics, Roma and dissidents were also murdered. This list includes people from public life who, owing to their origins, their political or religious convictions, or their sexual orientation, were murdered by the Nazi regime. It includes those murdered in the Holocaust, as well as individuals otherwise killed by the Nazis before and during World War II. Those killed in concentration camps are listed alongside those who were murdered by the Nazi Party or those who chose suicide for political motives or to avoid being murdered.

The list is sorted by occupation and by nationality.

== Performing arts ==
Name	Lifespan	Nationality	Achievements	Reasons for persecution	Cause of death
Hana Brady	1931–1944	Czech	Portrayed in Hana's Suitcase: A True Story	Jewish	Gassed at Auschwitz concentration camp
René Blum	1878–1942	French	Founder of the Ballet de l'Opéra à Monte Carlo	Jewish	Murdered at Auschwitz concentration camp
Arthur Bergen	1875–1943	Austrian	Actor, director	Jewish	Auschwitz concentration camp
Egon Friedell	1878–1938	Austrian	Actor, cabaret performer	Jewish	Suicide to avoid arrest by Sturmabteilung
Eugen Burg	1871–1944	German	Film actor	Jewish	Died in Theresienstadt Ghetto
Ernst Arndt	1861-1942/3	German	Actor	Jewish	Murdered in the gas chamber at Treblinka concentration camp
Lea Deutsch	1927–1943	Croatian	Child actress	Jewish	Heart failure on route to the Auschwitz concentration camp
Max Ehrlich	1892–1944	German	Actor, screenwriter, director, best-selling author	Jewish	Gassed at Auschwitz concentration camp
Lisl Frank	1911–1944	Czech	Dancer, cabaret singer	Jewish	Forced death march from Auschwitz to Christianstadt
Kurt Gerron	1897–1944	German	Performer, actor, film director	Jewish	Gassed at Auschwitz concentration camp
Dora Gerson	1899–1943	German	Actress, cabaret singer	Jewish	Gassed at Auschwitz concentration camp
John Gottowt	1881–1942	Austro-Hungarian	Actor	Jewish	Murdered by SS in Wieliczka
Joachim Gottschalk	1904–1941	German	Actor	Jewish family	Suicide in Berlin to avoid arrest
Leslie Howard	1893–1943	British	Actor	Jewish	Airplane shot down by Luftwaffe
Olga Islar	1865–1944	German	Operatic soprano	Jewish	Murdered at Theresienstadt Ghetto
Georg John	1879–1941	German	Actor	Jewish	Łódź Ghetto
Salomon Meyer Kannewasser	1916–1945	Dutch	Jazz singer. Part of the duo 'Johnny & Jones'	Jewish	Died of exhaustion in Bergen-Belsen
Paul Morgan	1886–1938	Austrian	Actor, cabaret performer	Jewish	Buchenwald concentration camp
Bernard Natan	1886–1942	Franco-Romanian	Film director, actor and former head of Pathé Film Studios	Jewish	Auschwitz concentration camp
Jacques Presburg	1881–1943	Dutch	composer of theatre music, pianist, violinist, and conductor	Jewish	Auschwitz concentration camp
Joseph Schmidt	1904–1942	Ukrainian	Singer, actor	Jewish	Heart attack in a Swiss refugee camp in Gyrenbad
Fritz Spira	1881–1943	Austrian	Film and stage actor	Jewish	Died at Ruma concentration camp in Vojvodina
Mathilde Sussin	1876–1943	Austrian	Actress	Jewish	Theresienstadt concentration camp
Arnold Siméon van Wesel	1918–1945	Dutch	Jazz singer. Part of the duo Johnny & Jones	Jewish	Died of exhaustion in Bergen-Belsen
Miklós Vig	1898–1944	Hungarian	Singer, actor, comedian, theater secretary	Jewish	Shot in Budapest by members of the Arrow Cross
Clara de Vries	1915–1942	Dutch	Jazz trumpeter and bandleader	Jewish	Auschwitz concentration camp
Karel Hašler	1879–1941	Czech	Songwriter-lyricist, film and theatre director, actor, dramatist and screenwriter	patriotic songs	Mauthausen-Gusen concentration camp
Otto Wallburg	1899–1944	German	Actor and cabaret performer	Jewish	Auschwitz concentration camp
Witold Zacharewicz	1914–1943	Polish	Actor	aiding Jews	Auschwitz concentration camp
Max Zilzer	1868–1943	Hungarian-German	Actor	Jewish	Died under interrogation by the Gestapo

== Literature and publishing ==
Name	Lifespan	Nationality	Achievements	Reasons for persecution	Cause of death
Anne Frank	1929–1945	German / Dutch	author of a published diary	Jewish	typhus at Bergen-Belsen
Else Feldmann	1884–1942	Austrian	writer and journalist	Jewish	gas chamber at Sobibór
Egon Friedell	1878–1938	Austrian	writer and philosopher	Jewish	suicide to avoid deportation
Peter Hammerschlag	1902–1942	Austrian	writer and graphic artist	Jewish	died in detention, circumstances unclear, Auschwitz
Lidia Zamenhof	1904–1942	Polish	work for Esperanto movement, as well as translations of Baháʼí Faith writings	Jewish	gas chamber at Treblinka
Jura Soyfer	1912–1939	Austrian	journalist, writer	Jewish	typhus at Buchenwald
Itzhak Katzenelson	1886–1944	Belarusian	teacher, writer	Jewish	gas chamber at Auschwitz
Petr Ginz	1928–1944	Czech	editor of Vedem	Jewish	gas chamber at Auschwitz
Julius Fučík	1903–1943	Czech	resistance leader	Resistance in the Protectorate of Bohemia and Moravia	hanged at Plötzensee Prison
Milena Jesenská	1896–1944	Czech	journalist	Resistance in the Protectorate of Bohemia and Moravia	kidney failure at Ravensbrück concentration camp
Paul Kornfeld	1889–1942	Czech	writer	Jewish	died in detention, circumstances unclear
Karel Poláček	1892–1944	Czech	writer	Jewish	died in Gleiwitz concentration camp
Vladislav Vančura	1891–1942	Czech	writer, doctor	Resistance in the Protectorate of Bohemia and Moravia	executed at Kobylisy Shooting Range
Etty Hillesum	1914–1943	Dutch	writer, diary author	Jewish	died in detention, circumstances unclear
Helga Deen	1925–1943	Dutch	author of a published diary	Jewish	gas chamber at Sobibór
Jaap Nunes Vaz	1906-1943	Dutch	editor of Het Parool	Jewish	Sobibor
Hélène Berr	1921–1945	French	author of a published diary	Jewish	died in Bergen-Belsen concentration camp
Jacques Decour	1910–1942	French	writer, resistance leader	French Resistance	executed by firing squad
Robert Desnos	1900–1945	French	poet, resistance fighter	French Resistance	typhoid few weeks after the liberation of Theresienstadt concentration camp
Benjamin Fondane	1898–1944	French	poet, literary critic	Jewish, French Resistance	gas chamber at Auschwitz
Régis Messac	1893–1945	French	writer	French Resistance	died at either the Groß-Rosen or Dora concentration camp
Walter Benjamin	1892–1940	German	literary critic and philosopher	Jewish	suicide at Portbou to avoid deportation
Felix Fechenbach	1894–1933	German	journalist and activist	Jewish	executed during the deportation to Dachau
Walter Hasenclever	1890–1940	German	expressionist writer	Jewish	suicide to avoid deportation
Jakob van Hoddis	1887–1942	German	writer	Jewish	gas chamber at Sobibór
Jochen Klepper	1903–1942	German	writer	Jewish family	suicide in Berlin
Erich Knauf	1895–1944	German	journalist, poet	making jokes about the Nazi regime	beheaded at Brandenburg-Görden Prison
Clementine Krämer	1873–1942	German	author, poet, social worker	Jewish	died at Theresienstadt
Adam Kuckhoff	1887–1943	German	writer, dramatist, Resistance fighter	German resistance to Nazism	died in detention, circumstances unclear
Erich Mühsam	1878–1934	German	writer, anarchist	Jewish	executed at Plötzensee Prison
Willi Münzenberg	1889–1940	German	publisher, politician	Communist	murdered at Oranienburg concentration camp
Friedrich Münzer	1868–1942	German	philologist	Jewish	enteritis at Theresienstadt
Carl von Ossietzky	1889–1938	German	journalist, Nobel Peace Prize winner	exposing the clandestine German re-armament	tuberculosis
Erich Salomon	1886–1944	German	photojournalist	Jewish	died in detention, circumstances unclear
Libertas Schulze-Boysen	1913–1942	German	film critic, resistance fighter	German resistance to Nazism	executed at Plötzensee Prison
Miklós Radnóti	1909–1944	Hungarian	poet	Jewish	shot into a mass grave near Abda, Hungary
Antal Szerb	1901–1945	Hungarian	writer, literary scholar	Jewish	beaten to death in a concentration camp in Balf
Mordechai Gebirtig	1877–1942	Polish	Yiddish poet, musician and composer	Jewish	shot dead in the Krakow Ghetto
Bruno Schulz	1892–1942	Polish	writer	Jewish	shot dead in the ghetto at Drohobycz
Debora Vogel	1902–1942	Polish	poet, philosopher	Jewish	shot in the Lwów Ghetto
Willi Schmid	1893–1934	German	music critic	mistaken identity	accidental victim of the Night of the Long Knives in a case of mistaken identity
Martha Wertheimer	1890–1942	German	journalist	Jewish	a Kindertransport director, sent to Sobibor extermination camp
Elena Shirman	1908–1942	Russian	poet	Jewish	beaten to death in Rostov Oblast, Russia
Selma Meerbaum-Eisinger	1924–1942	Romanian	writer	Jewish	typhus at the Mikhailovska labor camp in rural Ukraine
David Vogel	1891–1944	Russian	Hebrew writer	Jewish	tuberculosis at a satellite camp of the Neuengamme concentration camp
Anton de Kom	1898–1945	Surinamese	author, human rights activist	Dutch resistance	died in detention, circumstances unclear, Neuengamme
Irène Némirovsky	1903–1942	Ukrainian-French	writer	Jewish	gas chamber at Auschwitz
Else Ury	1877–1943	German	writer	Jewish	gas chamber at Auschwitz
Renia Spiegel	1924–1942	Polish	author of a published diary	Jewish	shot dead in Przemyśl

== Visual arts and design ==
Name	Lifespan	Nationality	Achievements	Reasons for persecution	Cause of death
Friedl Dicker-Brandeis	1896–1944	Austrian	artist	Jewish	gas chamber in Auschwitz
Josef Čapek	1887–1945	Czech	painter, draughtsman, illustrator, writer	Resistance in the Protectorate of Bohemia and Moravia	typhoid fever at Bergen-Belsen
Fiszel Zylberberg-Zber	1909–1942	Polish	Woodcuts artist and painter	Jewish	gas chamber at Auschwitz
Frania Hart	1896–1943	Polish/French	painter	Jewish	unknown
Abraham Icek Tuschinski	1886–1942	Dutch	designer of the Tuschinski Theater	Jewish	gas chamber at Auschwitz
Max Jacob	1876–1944	French	artist	Jewish	pneumonia at Drancy
Ernst Ludwig Kirchner	1880–1938	German	painter	German resistance to Nazism	suicide due to persecution, Davos
Julius Klinger	1876–1942	Austrian	artist/designer	Jewish	
Elfriede Lohse-Wächtler	1899–1940	German	painter	Action T4	Aktion T4 victim at Sonnenstein Euthanasia Centre
Jacob Mącznik	1905–1945	Polish	painter	Jewish	slave labor at Ebensee division of Mauthausen
Samuel J. de Mesquita	1868–1944	Dutch	painter and designer	Jewish	gas chamber at Auschwitz
Max van Dam	1910–1943	Dutch	painter	Jewish	died as one of the few inmates at Sobibor
Marianne Franken	1884-1945	Dutch	painter	Jewish	Bergen-Belsen
Mommie Schwarz	1876-1942	Dutch	painter	Jewish	Auschwitz
Else Berg	1877-1942	Dutch	painter	Jewish	Auschwitz
Martin Monnickendam	1874-1943	Dutch	painter	Jewish	suspicious circumstances prior to deportation
Felix Nussbaum	1904–1944	Austrian	painter	Jewish	gas chamber at Auschwitz
Karl Pärsimägi	1902–1942	Estonian	painter	French Resistance	Auschwitz
Heinrich Rauchinger	1858–1942	Polish/Austrian	painter	Jewish	Theresienstadt
Jan Rubczak	1884–1942	Polish	painter, graphic artist	Polish intelligentsia	gas chamber at Auschwitz
Charlotte Salomon	1917–1943	German	painter	Jewish	gas chamber at Auschwitz
Ljuba Monastirskaja	1906–1941	Latvian	textile artist	Jewish	killed at the Rumbula massacre
Otti Berger	1898–1944	Hungarian	textile artist	Jewish	Auschwitz
Paul Guermonprez	1908–1944	Dutch	photographer, graphic artist	Dutch resistance	Shot by the SS near Bloemendaal

== Music ==
Name	Lifespan	Nationality	Achievements	Reasons for persecution	Cause of death
Pavel Haas	1899–1944	Czech	composer	Jewish	gas chamber at Auschwitz
Heinz Alt	1922–1945	German	composer	Jewish	Dachau
Ernst Bachrich	1892–1942	Austrian	composer	?	Majdanek/Lublin concentration camp
Al Bowlly	1898–1941	South African/British	vocalist	The Blitz	killed by a Luftwaffe parachute mine in London
Žiga Hirschler	1894–1941	Croatian	composer	Jewish	Jasenovac concentration camp
Rudolf Karel	1880–1945	Czech	composer	Resistance in the Protectorate of Bohemia and Moravia	dysentery at Theresienstadt
Gideon Klein	1919–1945	Czech	composer	Jewish	killed during liquidation of Fürstengrube, a sub-camp of Auschwitz
Hans Krása	1899–1944	Czech (Bohemian)	composer	Jewish	gas chamber at Auschwitz
Mario Finzi	1913–1945	Italian	pianist	Jewish	intestinal infection at Auschwitz shortly after liberation
Leon Jessel	1871–1942	German	composer	Jewish	torture by Gestapo, Berlin
Erwin Schulhoff	1894–1942	Czech	composer, jazz pianist	Jewish	tuberculosis at Wülzburg concentration camp
Viktor Ullmann	1898–1944	Czech	composer, pianist	Jewish	gas chamber at Auschwitz
Karlrobert Kreiten	1916–1943	German	pianist	German resistance to Nazism	hanged at Plötzensee Prison
Alma Rosé	1906–1944	Austrian	violinist, conductor	Jewish	possibly poisoning, at Auschwitz
Józef Koffler	1896–1944	Polish	composer, teacher, columnist	Jewish	probably shot by Einsatzgruppen at Krosno
Leo Smit	1900–1943	Dutch	composer	Jewish	gas chamber at Sobibór
Marcel Tyberg	1893–1944	Austrian	composer, pianist, conductor	Jewish	gas chamber at Auschwitz
Leone Sinigaglia	1868–1944	Italian	composer	Jewish	suffered a fatal heart attack at the moment of his arrest
Gershon Sirota	1874–1943	Polish	cantor, tenor	Jewish	killed in Warsaw Ghetto Uprising
Ilse Weber	1903–1944	Czech	composer, playwright	Jewish	gas chamber at Auschwitz

== Humanities ==
Name	Lifespan	Nationality	Achievements	Reasons for persecution	Cause of death
Mildred Harnack	1902–1943	American	literary historian, translator, resistance fighter	German resistance to Nazism	beheaded at Plötzensee Prison
Elise Richter	1865–1943	Austrian	Romance philology professor	Jewish	Theresienstadt
Simon Dubnow	1860–1941	Belarusian	historian, writer, activist	Jewish	killed at the Riga Ghetto during the Rumbula massacre
Norbert Jokl	1877–1942	Czech	Albanologist	Jewish	Roßau (?)
Marc Bloch	1886–1944	French	historian, resistance leader	Jewish, French Resistance	tortured and shot by Gestapo at Saint-Didier-de-Formans
Valentin Feldman	1909–1942	French	philosopher, resistance leader	Jewish, French Resistance	executed by firing squad
Georges Politzer	1903–1942	French	philosopher, resistance leader	Jewish, French Resistance	executed by firing squad
Boris Vildé	1908–1942	French	ethnographer, resistance fighter	French Resistance	executed by firing squad
Avgust Pirjevec	1887–1944	Slovenian	literary historian	anti-Fascist activities of his children	Gusen
Walter Benjamin	1892–1940	German	philosopher	Jewish	suicide at Portbou to avoid deportation
Friedrich Münzer	1868–1942	German	classical scholar	Jewish	Theresienstadt

== Mathematics ==
Name	Lifespan	Nationality	Achievements	Reasons for persecution	Cause of death
Georg Alexander Pick	1859–1942	Austrian	Pick's theorem	Jewish	Theresienstadt
Emanuel Lodewijk Elte	1881-1943	Dutch	Gosset–Elte figures	Jewish	Sobibor
Jean Cavaillès	1903–1944	French	philosopher of science, resistance leader	French Resistance	executed by firing squad
Isaak Bacharach	1854–1942	German	Cayley-Bacharach Theorem	Jewish	Theresienstadt
Albert Lautman	1908–1944	French	mathematical philosopher, resistance leader	Jewish, French Resistance	executed by firing squad
Otto Blumenthal	1876–1944	German	Work in number theory, editor of Mathematische Annalen	Jewish	Theresienstadt
Felix Hausdorff	1868–1942	German	One of the founders of modern topology and contributed significantly to set theory, descriptive set theory, measure theory, function theory, and functional analysis.	Jewish	suicide, Bonn
Friedrich Hartogs	1874–1943	German	Foundational work in several complex variables	Jewish	suicide, Großhesselohe
Robert Remak	1888–1942	German	Work in group theory, number theory, mathematical economics	Jewish	Auschwitz
Adolf Lindenbaum	1904–1941	Polish	Work in set theory	Jewish	Ghetto Vilnius
Antoni Łomnicki	1881–1941	Polish	Polish mathematician	Polish intelligentsia	Massacre of Lwów
Stanisław Ruziewicz	1889–1941	Polish	Ruziewicz problem	Polish intelligentsia	Massacre of Lwów
Stanisław Saks	1897–1942	Polish	Work in measure theory	Jewish, Polish underground	murdered in prison by the Gestapo, Warsaw
Juliusz Schauder	1899–1943	Polish	Schauder fixed point theorem, Schauder basis	Jewish	executed by the Gestapo, Lviv
Włodzimierz Stożek	1883–1941	Polish	Polish mathematician	Polish intelligentsia	Massacre of Lwów
Alfred Tauber	1866–1942	Slovak	Tauberian theorems	Jewish	Theresienstadt

== Natural sciences ==
Name	Lifespan	Nationality	Achievements	Reasons for persecution	Cause of death
Ernst Cohen	1869–1944	Dutch	chemist, work on the allotropy of metals	Jewish	gas chamber at Auschwitz
Jacques Solomon	1908–1942	French	physicist and radiologist, resistance leader	Jewish, French Resistance	executed by firing squad
Elisabeth Wollman	1888–1943	French	microbiologist and physicist, work on bacteriophages and lysogeny	Jewish	Auschwitz (presumed gas chamber)
Eugène Wollman	1883–1943	French	microbiologist and physicist, work on bacteriophages and lysogeny	Jewish	Auschwitz (presumed gas chamber)

== Medicine and psychology ==
Name	Lifespan	Nationality	Achievements	Reasons for persecution	Cause of death
Karl Herxheimer	1861-1942	German	dermatologist, described Pick-Herxheimer disease and Jarisch-Herxheimer reaction	Jewish	Theresienstadt
Tadeusz Boy-Żeleński	1874–1941	Polish	paediatrician, poet, translator	Polish intelligentsia	Massacre of Lwów
Antoni Cieszyński	1882–1941	Polish	physician, dentist, surgeon	Polish intelligentsia	Massacre of Lwów
Władysław Dobrzaniecki	1897–1941	Polish	physician, surgeon	Polish intelligentsia	Massacre of Lwów
Gisela Januszewska	1867–1943	Austrian	physician	Jewish	Theresienstadt
Janusz Korczak	1878–1942	Polish	pediatrician, educator, child welfare	Jewish	Treblinka
Adolf Reichwein	1898–1944	German	doctor, educator, politician	German resistance to Nazism	executed, Berlin-Plötzensee
Sabina Spielrein	1885–1942	Russian	physician, psychiatrist, psychoanalyst	Jewish	Massacre of Zmievskaya Balka
Elisabeth von Thadden	1890–1944	German	educator	German resistance to Nazism	executed, Berlin-Plötzensee
Martha Goldberg	1873–1938	German	social activist, doctor's assistant	Jewish	Kristallnacht

== Law, business ==
Name	Lifespan	Nationality	Achievements	Reasons for persecution	Cause of death
Klaus Bonhoeffer	1901–1945	German	jurist, resistance fighter	German resistance to Nazism	executed, Berlin
Betsie ten Boom	1885–1944	Dutch	book keeper	Dutch resistance	Pernicious anemia, Ravensbrück
Casper ten Boom	1859–1944	Dutch	watchmaker	Dutch resistance	tuberculosis, mistreatment at Scheveningen Prison
Hans von Dohnányi	1902–1945	German	jurist, resistance fighter	German resistance to Nazism	executed, Sachsenhausen
Reinhold Frank	1896–1945	German	lawyer, member of 20 July Plot	German resistance to Nazism	executed, Berlin-Plötzensee
Martin Gauger	1905–1941	German	jurist, pacifist, member of the Kreisau Circle	German resistance to Nazism	NS-Tötungsanstalt Sonnenstein
Maurice Halbwachs	1877–1945	French	sociologist, economist, philosopher, developer of collective memory	French Resistance	Buchenwald
Franz Kaufmann	1886–1944	German	jurist	German resistance to Nazism	Sachsenhausen
René Lefebvre	1879–1944	French	factory owner	French Resistance	Sonnenburg
Wilhelm Mautner	1889–1944	Austrian	economist	Jewish	Auschwitz concentration camp
Helmuth James Graf von Moltke	1907–1945	German	jurist, founder of the Kreisau Circle	German resistance to Nazism	executed, Berlin-Plötzensee
Alfred Müller	1888–1945	Croatian	entrepreneur	Jewish	Dachau
Leo Müller	1894–1941	Croatian	entrepreneur	Jewish	Jasenovac
Karl Sack	1896–1945	German	jurist, member of the 20 July plot	German resistance to Nazism	executed, Flossenbürg
Rüdiger Schleicher	1895–1945	German	resistance fighter	German resistance to Nazism	executed, Berlin
Armin Schreiner	1874–1941	Croatian	industrialist	Jewish	Jasenovac
Halina Seyda	1906–1944	Polish	banker	Polish resistance to Nazism	executed, Warsaw Ghetto
Kazimierz Prószyński	1875–1945	Polish	inventor	Polish intelligentsia	Mauthausen
Elisabeth de Rothschild	1902–1945	French	wife of Baron Philippe de Rothschild	Jewish	Ravensbrück
Ludwik Maurycy Landau	1902–1944	Polish	economist	Polish resistance movement in World War II	executed, Warsaw

== Theology, spirituality, religion ==
Name	Lifespan	Nationality	Achievements	Reasons for persecution	Cause of death
Hedwig Jahnow	1879-1944	German	Old testament theologian	Jewish	malnutrition in Theresienstadt
Bernhard Lichtenberg	1875–1943	German	Catholic priest, blessed	German resistance to Nazism	illness during transport to Dachau
Titus Brandsma	1881–1942	Dutch	Catholic priest, philosopher, journalist, saint	Dutch resistance	lethal injection, Dachau
Otto Neururer	1882–1940	Austrian	Catholic priest, blessed	Austrian resistance	practically crucified by being nailed upside down to a tree, Buchenwald
Max Josef Metzger	1887–1944	German	Catholic priest, peace activist, blessed	German resistance to Nazism	guillotined, Brandenburg-Görden Prison
Michał Kozal	1893–1943	Polish	Catholic bishop, blessed	Polish resistance movement in World War II	lethal injection, Dachau
Maria Restituta Kafka	1894–1943	Austrian	Catholic nun, nurse, blessed	Austrian resistance	guillotined, Vienna
Jakob Gapp	1897–1943	Austrian	Catholic priest, blessed	Austrian resistance	guillotined, Plötzensee Prison, Berlin
Kaj Munk	1898–1944	Danish	Lutheran theologian, playwright	Danish resistance movement	murdered by an SS-Sonderkommando, Hørbylunde/Denmark
Lodewijk Sarlois	1884-1942	Dutch	Chief Rabbi of the Netherlands	Jewish	Auschwitz
Dietrich Bonhoeffer	1906–1945	German	Lutheran pastor, theologian	German resistance to Nazism	Hanged with thin wire, Flossenbürg
Regina Jonas	1902–1944	German	first woman Rabbi	Jewish	Auschwitz
Jochen Klepper	1903–1942	German	Christian theologian, journalist	Jewish family	suicide shortly before deportation, Berlin
Alfred Delp	1907–1945	German	Jesuit priest, philosopher, Kreisau Circle member, Servant of God	German resistance to Nazism	executed by hanging, Plötzensee Prison
Friedrich Lorenz	1897–1944	German	Catholic priest, member of Missionary Oblates of Mary Immaculate	German resistance to Nazism	executed, Halle an der Saale (beheaded)
Paul Schneider	1897–1939	German	clergyman	German resistance to Nazism	lethal injection, Buchenwald
Edith Stein	1891–1942	German	Catholic nun, philosopher, saint (born Jewish)	Jewish	gas chamber at Auschwitz
Sándor Büchler	1869–1944	Hungarian	rabbi, historian	Jewish	Auschwitz
Giovanni Fornasini	1915–1944	Italian	Catholic parish priest, MOVM, Servant of God	Italian resistance movement	shot by a member of the Waffen SS, Marzabotto
Avraham Yitzchak Bloch	1891–1941	Lithuanian	Chief Rabbi, rosh yeshiva of the Telz Yeshiva	Jewish	murdered in a massacre of the male population of Telz
Elchonon Wasserman	1875–1941	Lithuanian	rabbi, rosh yeshiva	Jewish	Kovno
Riccardo Pacifici	1904–1943	Italian	rabbi	Jewish	gas chamber at Auschwitz
Azriel Rabinowitz	1905–1941	Lithuanian	rabbi, rosh yeshiva at the Telz Yeshiva	Jewish	murdered in a massacre of the male population of Telz
Maximilian Kolbe	1894–1941	Polish	Catholic friar, saint	Polish resistance movement in World War II	lethal injection after voluntarily taking place of another prisoner, Auschwitz
Stefan Wincenty Frelichowski	1913–1945	Polish	Catholic priest, blessed	Polish resistance movement in World War II	Dachau
Karl Ernst Krafft	1900–1945	Swiss	astrologer, occultist	crackdown on astrologers, faith healers and occultists following Rudolf Hess's flight to Scotland	Typhus, during transport to Buchenwald
Richard Henkes	1900–1945	German	Catholic priest, blessed	German resistance to Nazism	typhus at Dachau
Kalonymus Kalman Shapira	1889–1943	Polish	Rabbi	Jewish	Aktion Erntefest
Menachem Ziemba	1883–1943	Polish	Rabbi	Jewish	The Warsaw Ghetto Uprising
Maria Skobtsova	1891–1945	Russian	Russian Orthodox nun, saint	French Resistance	gas chamber, Ravensbrück concentration camp
Alojs Andritzki	1914–1943	German	Catholic priest, blessed	German resistance to Nazism	lethal injection, Dachau
Karl Leisner	1915–1945	German	Catholic priest, blessed	German resistance to Nazism	tuberculosis contracted at Dachau, died shortly after liberation
Edward Kaźmierski	1919–1942	Polish	Catholic youth leader, blessed	Polish resistance movement in World War II	Guillotined, Dresden
Marcel Callo	1921–1945	French	Catholic youth leader, blessed	French Resistance	Mauthausen

== Sports ==
Name	Lifespan	Nationality	Achievements	Reasons for persecution	Cause of death
Eddy Hamel	1902–1943	American	first Jewish football player of AFC Ajax	Jewish	Murdered at Auschwitz
Evžen Rošický	1914–1942	Czech	athlete (800m, 400m relay), 1936 Berlin Olympic Games	Resistance in the Protectorate of Bohemia and Moravia	executed at Kobylisy Shooting Range
Otto Herschmann	1877–1942	Austrian	fencer & swimmer; 2-time Olympic silver medalist; one of only a few athletes who have won Olympic medals in multiple sports	Jewish	Izbica concentration camp
Heinrich Wolf	1875–1943	Austrian	chess player	Jewish	Vienna
Vera Menchik	1906–1944	British-Czech	chess player; world champion	The Blitz	killed in a V-1 rocket bombing raid in South London
Karel Treybal	1885–1941	Czech	chess player; chess Olympian	Resistance in the Protectorate of Bohemia and Moravia	executed, Prague
Salo Landau	1903–1944	Dutch	chess player	Jewish	Gräditz concentration camp
Gerrit Kleerekoper	1897–1943	Dutch	coach Dutch gymnastics team 1928 Amsterdam Olympic Games	Jewish	Sobibór
Estella Agsteribbe	1909–1943	Dutch	gymnast (team); Olympic gold medalist	Jewish	Auschwitz
Helena Nordheim	1903–1943	Dutch	gymnast (team); Olympic gold medalist	Jewish	Sobibór
Anna Dresden-Polak	1906–1943	Dutch	gymnast (team); Olympic gold medalist	Jewish	Sobibór
Jud Simons	1904–1943	Dutch	gymnast (team); Olympic gold medalist	Jewish	Sobibór
Isidore Goudeket	1883-1943	Dutch	gymnast; placed 7th in team event in the 1908 Olympics	Jewish	Sobibór
Abraham de Oliveira	1880-1943	Dutch	gymnast; placed 7th in team event in the 1908 Olympics	Jewish	Sobibór
Alfred Flatow	1869–1942	German	gymnast; 3-time Olympic gold medalist & 1-time silver medalist	Jewish	Theresienstadt
Gustav Flatow	1875–1945	German	gymnast; 2-time Olympic gold medalist	Jewish	Theresienstadt
Lilli Henoch	1899–1942	German	4 world records (discus, shot put, and 4×100-m relay), 10 German national championships	Jewish	Riga Ghetto
Werner Seelenbinder	1904–1944	German	wrestler; Olympian	Communist	executed, Brandenburg an der Havel
Johann Trollmann	1907–1943	German	boxer; German national champion	Sinti	Neuengamme
János Garay (fencer)	1889–1945	Hungarian	fencer; Olympic gold, silver, and bronze medalist	Jewish	Mauthausen
Oszkár Gerde	1883–1944	Hungarian	fencer; 2-time Olympic gold medalist	Jewish	Mauthausen
Attila Petschauer	1904–1943	Hungarian	fencer; 2-time Olympic gold medalist & 1-time silver medalist	Jewish	Davidovka concentration camp
András Székely	1909–1943	Hungarian	swimmer, Olympic silver (200-m breaststroke) and bronze (4×200-m freestyle relay)	Jewish	killed at a forced labor camp in Chernihiv, Ukraine
Bronisław Czech	1908–1944	Polish	skier: Olympian	Polish resistance movement in World War II	Auschwitz
Roman Kantor	1912–1943	Polish	fencer; Olympian	Jewish	Majdanek concentration camp
Józef Klotz	1900–1941	Polish	Polish national soccer team	Jewish	killed in the Warsaw Ghetto
Janusz Kusociński	1907–1940	Polish	athlete;1932 Los Angeles men's athletics gold medalist	Polish resistance movement in World War II	executed in Palmiry
Dawid Przepiórka	1880–1940	Polish	chess player; chess Olympian	Jewish	executed, Warsaw
Leon Sperling	1900–1941	Polish	left wing on national soccer team	Jewish	Lemberg Ghetto
Ilja Szrajbman	1907–1943	Polish	swimmer, Olympic 4×200-m freestyle relay	Jewish	Majdanek concentration camp
Victor Perez	1911–1945	Tunisian	boxer; world flyweight champion	Jewish	Auschwitz
Ernest Toussaint	1908–1942	Luxembourgian	boxer	Luxembourg Resistance	Hinzert concentration camp
László Bartók	1904–1944	Hungarian	Olympic rower, 1928 Summer Olympics – Men's coxed four	?	Buchenwald

== Politics, resistance ==
Name	Lifespan	Nationality	Political Ideology/Occupation	Reasons for persecution	Cause of death
Käthe Leichter	1895–1942	Austrian	Politician, economist	Jewish	executed, Bernburg Euthanasia Centre
Gisela Tschofenig	1917–1945	Austrian	Communist political activist	German Resistance	executed by firearm, Schörgenhub labour camp
Rosa Manus	1891–1942	Dutch	Feminist and peace activist	Jewish	murdered by gassing, Bernburg
Victor Basch	1877–1945	French	Aesthetician, politician	Jewish	assassinated by the Vichy French Milice
Pierre Brossolette	1903–1944	French	high resistance leader	French Resistance	committed suicide (so as not to break under Gestapo torture)
Georges Mandel	1885–1944	French	Politician, resistance leader	Jewish, French Resistance	murdered in the Forest of Fontainebleau
Jean Moulin	1899–1943	French	high resistance leader	French Resistance	tortured to death by the Gestapo
Jean Maurice Paul Jules de Noailles	1893–1945	French	Duke of Ayen, French resistance fighter	French Resistance	died at Bergen-Belsen a few days before the end of the war
Jean Zay	1904–1944	French	politician, former minister of French Government	Jewish, French Resistance	assassinated by the Vichy French Milice
Edgar André	1894–1936	German	Communist	Communist	executed, Hamburg
Friedrich Aue	1896–1944	German	Communist	Communist	executed, Brandenburg
Judith Auer	1905–1944	German	Communist resistance fighter	Jewish, Communist	executed, Berlin
Bernhard Bästlein	1894–1944	German	Communist	Communist	executed, Brandenburg
Olga Benário Prestes	1908–1942	German-Brazilian	Communist	Jewish, Communist	executed, Ravensbrück
Albrecht Graf von Bernstorff	1890–1945	German	Diplomat	German resistance to Nazism	murdered in custody, Berlin
Cato Bontjes van Beek	1920–1944	German	Red Orchestra (communist) resistance fighter	German resistance to Nazism	executed, Berlin-Plötzensee
Rudolf Breitscheid	1874–1944	German	Social Democrat	political opponent	executed, Buchenwald
Josefine Brunner	1909–1943	Austria	Socialist	Austrian resistance to Nazism	executed by decapitation alongside her husband,Stadelheim Prison
Marianne Cohn	1922–1944	German	Maquis Resistance fighter	Jewish, French Resistance	Beaten to death by Gestapo
Hans Coppi	1916–1942	German	Communist resistance fighter	Communist, German resistance to Nazism	executed, Berlin-Plötzensee
Hilde Coppi	1909–1943	German	Communist resistance fighter	Communist, German resistance to Nazism	executed, Berlin-Plötzensee
Gusta Dawidson Draenger	1917-1943	Polish	leader of Akiva youth movement	Jewish	executed, Gestapo custody, Krakow
Georg Elser	1903–1945	German	Manual laborer, Rotfront-Kämpfer	planned and carried out an elaborate assassination attempt on Adolf Hitler	executed, Dachau
Carl Friedrich Goerdeler	1884–1945	German	Mayor of Leipzig, Putschist	political opponent	executed, Berlin-Plötzensee
Willi Graf	1918–1943	German	White Rose resistance fighter; student	German resistance to Nazism	Guillotined, Munich–Stadelheim Prison
Albrecht Haushofer	1903–1945	German	Diplomat, writer	German resistance to Nazism	executed, Berlin-Moabit
Rudolf Hilferding	1877–1941	German	Social Democrat	Jewish	executed, Gestapo custody, Paris
Otto Hirsch	1885–1941	German	Representative of German Jews	Jewish	executed, Mauthausen concentration camp
Camill Hoffmann	1878–1944	German	Diplomat, writer	Jewish	executed, Auschwitz
Martin Hoop	1892–1933	German	Communist, District leader of KPD in Saxony	Communist	executed, Zwickau
Kurt Huber	1893–1943	German	White Rose resistance fighter, professor	German resistance to Nazism	Guillotined, Munich–Stadelheim Prison
Franz Jacob	1906–1944	German	Communist	Communist, German resistance to Nazism	executed, Brandenburg
Steffi Kunke	1908–1943	Austrian	Socialist, teacher and member of the Central Committee of the Revolutionary Socialist Youth	Socialist, Austrian resistance to Nazism	Sources vary, she either died of typhus or was beaten to death, Auschwitz
Ludwig Landmann	1868-1945	German	DDP politician, Mayor of Frankfurt	Jewish	starved to death in hiding place
Julius Leber	1891–1944	German	Socialist	German resistance to Nazism	executed, Berlin-Plötzensee
Wilhelm Leuschner	1890–1944	German	Politician	20 July plot	executed, Berlin-Plötzensee
August Lütgens	1897-1933	German	Communist	Communist, German resistance to Nazism	executed, Amtsgericht Altona
Ottilie Pohl	1867–1943	German	Resistance fighter	Jewish	executed, Theresienstadt
Fritz Pröll	1915–1944	German	Resistance fighter	German resistance to Nazism	Suicide due to threatened torture, Nordhausen
Christoph Probst	1918–1943	German	White Rose resistance fighter, student	German resistance to Nazism	Guillotined, Munich–Stadelheim Prison
Joseph Roth	1896–1945	German	Teacher and politician	Jewish	murdered by a poison injection after being imprisoned in Buchenwald
Anton Saefkow	1903–1944	German	Communist, resistance fighter	Communist, German resistance to Nazism	executed, Zuchthaus Brandenburg
Werner Scharff	1912–1945	German	Resistance fighter, electrician	Jewish, German resistance to Nazism	executed, Sachsenhausen
Rudolf von Scheliha	1897–1942	German	Red Orchestra (communist) resistance fighter, diplomat	German resistance to Nazism	Guillotined, Berlin-Plötzensee
Alexander Schmorell	1917–1943	German	White Rose resistance fighter, student	German resistance to Nazism	Guillotined, Munich–Stadelheim Prison
Ernst Schneller	1890–1944	German	KPD politician	German resistance to Nazism	executed, Sachsenhausen
Werner Scholem	1895–1940	German	Communist	Jewish, Communist	executed, Buchenwald
Hans Scholl	1918–1943	German	White Rose resistance fighter, medical student	German resistance to Nazism	Guillotined, Munich–Stadelheim Prison
Sophie Scholl	1921–1943	German	White Rose resistance fighter, student	German resistance to Nazism	Guillotined, Munich–Stadelheim Prison
Ilse Stöbe	1911–1942	German	Red Orchestra (communist) resistance fighter	German resistance to Nazism	Guillotined, Berlin-Plötzensee
Bruno Tesch	1913–1933	German	Communist	Communist	executed, Amtsgericht Altona
Ernst Thälmann	1886–1944	German	Leader of KPD	Communist	executed, Buchenwald
Adam von Trott zu Solz	1909–1944	German	Diplomat	German resistance to Nazism	executed, Berlin-Plötzensee
Jenő Deutsch (Eugen Deutsch)	1879–1944	Hungarian	Social democrat politician	?	executed
Hannah Szenes	1921–1944	Hungarian	Jewish partisan	Jewish	executed
Kazimierz Bartel	1882–1941	Polish	Prime Minister of Poland 1926–1930	Polish intelligentsia	executed
Paweł Frenkiel	1920–1943	Polish	Jewish Military Union leader	Jewish	executed
Yitzhak Gitterman	1889–1943	Polish	Politician, Director of American Jewish Joint Distribution Committee	Jewish	fighting in Warsaw Ghetto Uprising
Herschel Grynszpan	1921-1945?	Polish	shot the German diplomat Ernst vom Rath on 7 November 1938 in Paris	Jewish	executed, location of death not known, possibly Gestapo-Prison Berlin-Moabit
Stefan Rowecki	1895–1944	Polish	General, leader of the Armia Krajowa, journalist	Polish resistance movement in World War II	executed, Warsaw
Stefan Starzyński	1893–1943	Polish	Politician, economist, writer, Mayor of Warsaw 1934–1939	Polish intelligentsia	fate unknown, possibly died in Dachau
Szmul Zygielbojm	1895–1943	Polish	Bund leader	Jewish	suicide in protest of Nazism
Tone Čufar	1905–1942	Slovenian	Resistance fighter	Slovene Liberation Front	shot during an escape attempt
Slavko Šlander	1909–1941	Slovenian	Resistance fighter	Slovene Liberation Front	executed

== Military ==
Name	Lifespan	Nationality	Achievements	Reasons for persecution	Cause of death
Charles Delestraint	1879–1945	French	general, resistance leader	French Resistance	assassinated in Dachau concentration camp
Ludwig Beck	1880–1944	German	General, Putschist	20 July plot	executed, Berlin
Wilhelm Canaris	1887–1945	German	military information service	German resistance to Nazism	executed, Flossenbürg
Erich Fellgiebel	1886–1944	German	officer and resistance fighter in the Third Reich	20 July plot	executed, Berlin-Plötzensee
Werner von Haeften	1908–1944	German	jurist, adjutant of Claus Schenk Graf von Stauffenberg	20 July plot	executed, Berlin
Erich Hoepner	1886–1944	German	demoted Colonel General, member of Military opposition about Claus Schenk von Stauffenberg	20 July plot	executed, Berlin-Plötzensee
Albrecht Mertz von Quirnheim	1905–1944	German	Colonel, Putschist	20 July plot	executed, Berlin
Friedrich Olbricht	1888–1944	German	General, Putschist	20 July plot	executed, Berlin
Hans Oster	1887–1945	German	Chief of staff	20 July plot	executed, Flossenbürg
Harro Schulze-Boysen	1909–1942	German	officer, publicist	collaboration with Soviet intelligence	executed, Berlin-Plötzensee
Claus von Stauffenberg	1907–1944	German	Chief of staff of General Army Office, Putschist	20 July plot	executed, Berlin
Carl-Heinrich von Stülpnagel	1886–1944	German	military commander in occupied France	20 July plot	executed, Berlin-Plötzensee
Henning von Tresckow	1901–1944	German	Major General, Putschist	German resistance to Nazism	suicide, near Ostrov, Russia
Erwin von Witzleben	1881–1944	German	retired Field Marshal	20 July plot	executed, Berlin-Plötzensee
Maurizio Giglio	1920–1944	Italian	soldier, policeman, secret agent, MOVM	collaboration with Allied intelligence	shot, one of the victims of the Ardeatine massacre, Rome
Dmitry Karbyshev	1880–1945	Russian	Army(RKKA), engineer commander	Red Army general	executed, Mauthausen
Rudolf Viest	1890–1945	Slovak	Division General, commander of the Slovak National Uprising	Slovak National Uprising	executed, Flossenbürg
Ján Golian	1906–1945	Slovak	Brigadier General, commander of the Slovak National Uprising	Slovak National Uprising	executed, Flossenbürg

== See also ==
- List of Holocaust survivors
- List of authors banned in Nazi Germany
- List of victims and survivors of Auschwitz
