= Lisl =

Lisl is a German feminine given name. It is a diminutive of the name Elisabeth. Notable people with the name include:

- Elizabeth "Lisl" Close (née Scheu; 1912–2011), American architect
- Lisl Frank (1911–1944), Czech Jewish singer, dancer and actress
- Lisl Gaal (1924–2024), Austrian-born American mathematician
- Lisl Goldarbeiter (1909–1997), Austrian model and actress
- Elisabeth "Lisl" Kohn (1914–1999), wife of Norwegian psychiatrist Leo Eitinger
- Lisl Steiner (1927–2023), Austrian-born American photographer, photojournalist, and documentary filmmaker
- Lisl Wagner-Bacher (born 1953), Austrian cook

Fictional characters

- Lisl Baum, the Bond girl in the 1960 story Risico
- Countess Lisl von Schlaf in the 1981 film For Your Eyes Only

== See also ==
- Lisl and Leo Eitinger Prize (University of Oslo's Human Rights Award)
