= Rosa Lindemann =

German communist and anti-fascist

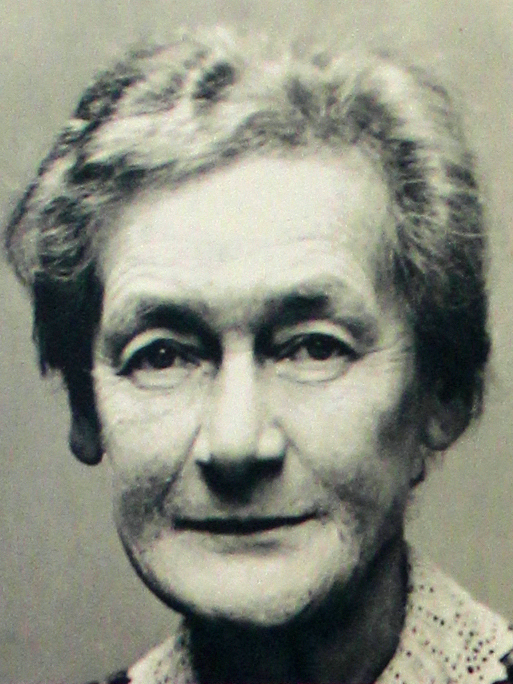
Rosa Lindemann

Rosa Lindemann (née Liesegang, 21 February 1876 – 13 June 1958) was a German communist and member of the German resistance to Nazism. She was born in Spandau, her family moved to Moabit when she was a child. She married Karl Lindemann in 1895, both joined the Social Democratic Party of Germany (SPD) in 1909. She later moved to the USPD, then the Communist Party of Germany (KPD) in 1920. She was elected to the city council and an active member of the Workers International Relief and Rote Hilfe.

After the 1933 Nazi seizure of power Lindemann worked with a group of women (also including Ottilie Pohl) in Moabit to assist victims of Nazi persecution. They collected money for the families of detainees, provided aid to resistance members in hiding, and distributed illegal pamphlets. Karl Lindemann died in 1944, their son Erich is thought to have fallen near Nauen at the end of the Second World War. Post-war Lindemann was retired but active in local politics for the KPD/SED. She died in 1958 in Staaken.
