= Martha Goldberg =

German women's rights and social activist

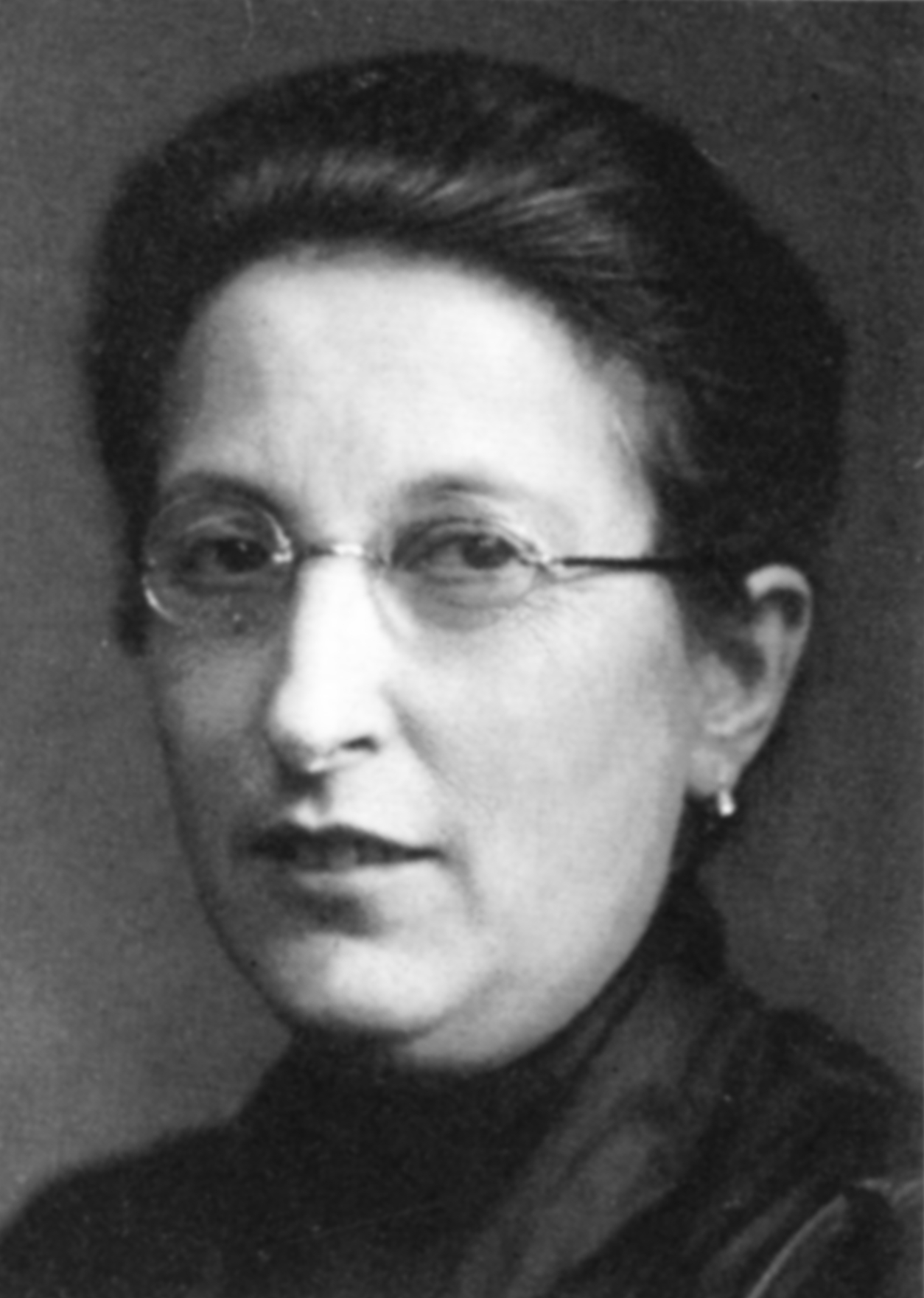
- Goldberg (around 1915)
- Born: 4 August 1873; Schwerin, Germany
- Died: 10 November 1938 (aged 65); Burgdamm, Germany
- Spouse: Adolph Goldberg (m. 1895)
- Children: 3

Martha Goldberg, née Sussmann (4 August 1873 – 10 November 1938) was a German woman and social activist, and one of five Jewish victims murdered by National Socialists in Bremen and the surrounding area during Reichspogromnacht. She was married to Dr Adolph Goldberg, also Jewish, whose practice was based in Burgdamm. Martha Goldberg was well respected due to her social conscience. For more than four decades she supported fellow citizens who were in need in a variety of ways, particularly those she encountered through her husband's medical practice. She and her husband were killed by a member of the Sturmabteilung.

Although the circumstances of her murder and its legal treatment in both the Nazi era and post-war period are documented in preserved trial records, the process of accounting for her personal fate did not begin until the 1980s. In Bremen, tributes to those murdered include the naming of a public square after the Goldbergs, and the naming of a nursery after Martha Goldberg.

== Life ==
=== Up to 1933 ===
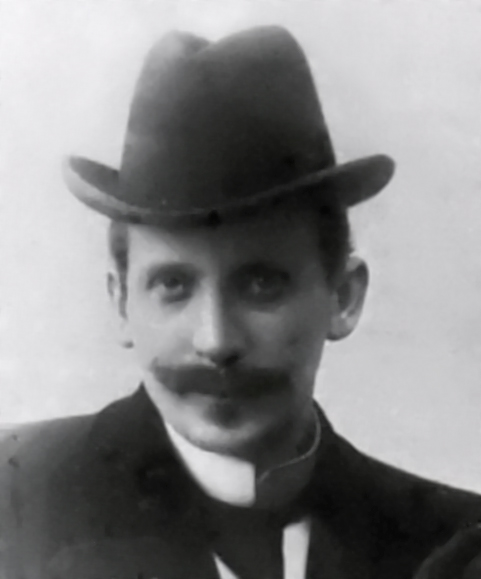
Adolph Goldberg (around 1901)

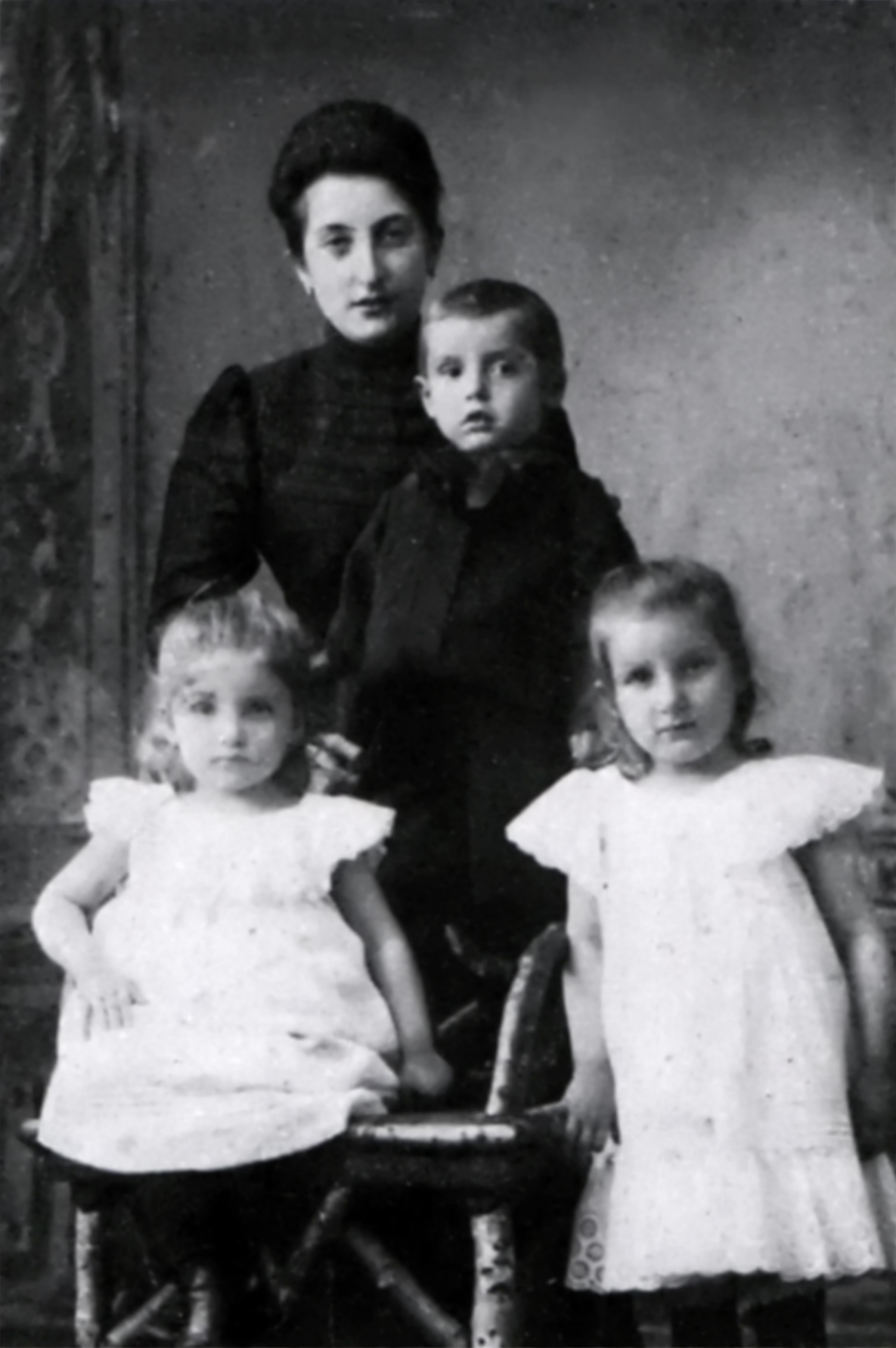
Martha Goldberg with her three children Käthe, Kurt and Gertrud (from left; around 1903)

Martha Sussmann was the daughter of affluent businessman Adolph Sussmann and his wife Bertha, née Ahrens. She was born in Schwerin in 1873. In 1895 she married the doctor Adolph Goldberg (also Adolf Goldberg; 1860–1938), from Soltau, and moved with him to the municipality of Lesum (part of Bremen since 1939). From 1888, her husband ran a doctor's practice there, in the district Burgdamm, in which Martha Goldberg worked as a receptionist, secretary and book-keeper.

From the turn of the century, the Goldbergs supported people in their area who were in social need through various personal initiatives and using their own resources. Martha Goldberg was considered an "extraordinarily open-minded, active, generous and caring woman". She often accompanied her husband on house calls – he was also known as an experienced obstetrician – and tried to improve the circumstances of patients in need. Among other things, she provided them with warm meals made in her household, helped in later years by her daughter Käthe as a young adult. Through her engagement with social issues, she contributed significantly to her husband's success as a doctor. The Goldbergs were "remarkably highly regarded", and were both prominent figures in the region Burg-Lesum, where they were active members of the community.

True to her patriotic convictions, during the First World War Martha Goldberg supported an appeal for donations by the Flottenbundes Deutscher Frauen (a women's union in support of the German navy) for the districts of Vegesack and Kreis Blumenthal. Towards the end of the war and in the year 1919, she was involved in a relief initiative by the Vaterländischen Frauenverein (Patriotic Women's Association), in which food was distributed, primarily to malnourished children.

In Lesum at that time, poverty was widespread, particularly in families with many children. The primary employer was the Bremer Woll-Wäscherei (Bremen Wool Laundry), founded in 1872/73 and located opposite Burg station, which was bought up by the Bremer Woll-Kämmerei and decommissioned in 1927. Towards the end of the Weimar Republic, during the period of mass unemployment which followed the crash of 1929, her husband became known entirely as a doctor for the poor and Martha Goldberg started up her "private social care" and her "soup kitchen" again.

Martha and Adolph Goldberg had three children, born towards the end of the 1890s: the first born was daughter Getrud, followed by slightly younger twins Käthe and Kurt. The siblings had a happy childhood and youth in Burgdamm. The family belonged to an affluent, bourgeois social class; they had many different social contacts and often traveled; they employed domestic staff such as a housemaid and a nanny, and the children received private tuition at home.

=== Under National Socialism ===
In Bremen and the surrounding area, as in the whole of the Third Reich, Jews were persecuted and discriminated against during the National Socialist era. After the NSDAP came into power in 1933 and after the Nuremberg Laws of 1935, the Goldbergs fell into increasing and in the end total isolation within their living and social environment. As early as 1934, their number of patients had already begun to decrease significantly, although reasons of age also played a role in this. In 1938, Adolph Goldberg lost his medical license according to the "Fourth Decree of the Reich Citizens Act", and had to close his practice. Martha and Adolph Goldberg avoided contact with their friends and acquaintances so that they did not make them "undesirable" or "punishable".

In addition, their family situation changed radically during this period of discrimination and persecution of Jews: their son, Kurt, committed suicide. Their oldest daughter, Gertrud, emigrated to Montevideo in Uruguay with her husband, Hans Friedheim, a textile merchant from Nienburg/Weser. Käthe, who had become a nurse due to the influence of her parents, emigrated to South Africa in the autumn of 1937.

=== November Pogrom and murder ===
There were multiple National Socialist organizations in Bremen, as in the rest of the Third Reich. To begin with, acts of violence were largely perpetrated by the Sturmabteilung (SA). The SA in Bremen was under the control of the SA group "Nordsee", which was originally based in Hannover and after 1933 had various posts in Bremen, latterly at 75 Hollerallee (now Forum Kirche of the Bremen Evangelical Church). From 1935, the regional SA group was led by Heinrich Böhmcker, who was also the mayor of Bremen. In Munich on the evening of 9 November 1938, Böhmcker attended a meeting of SA leaders in which Hitler and his propaganda minister Goebbels incited Germany-wide acts of terror against Jews: the so-called November Pogrom, which is still generally referred to by the now increasingly controversial term "Kristallnacht".

After an inflammatory speech by Goebbels, the attending Gauleiter and SA leaders gave their local duty offices commands according to this speech. Böhmcker also telephoned his staff office in Bremen: synagogues should be set on fire and businesses with Jewish owners should be destroyed. Word-for-word: "All Jews must be disarmed. If they resist, do not hesitate to shoot them down". As a result of this, during that same night the bicycle dealer Selma Zweinicki and the businessman Heinrich Rosenblum were killed in the Bremen area of Neustadt.

The terror order was passed from Bremen to Geestemünde, and from there, via Walter Seggermann, to the SA commanders Ernst Röschmann and Fritz Köster in a stronger form: "Red alert for the SA across the whole of Germany. [...] When evening comes, there can be no more Jews in Germany. Jewish business must also be destroyed." Köster, who was also the mayor of Lesum, reacted in surprise: "What is actually supposed to happen to the Jews?" – "Annihilate!". Röschmann reassured himself of this with a call to the SA group "Nordsee" in Bremen, in which the plan was confirmed.

Fritz Köster subsequently gave the command to shoot Adolph and Martha Goldberg in Burgdamm and the mechanic Leopold Sinasohn in the neighboring rural community Platjenwerbe, which is now a part of Ritterhude. All three were murdered in the night on 10 November 1938. The Goldbergs were "woken abruptly at 5 in the morning on 10 November" by an SA Scharführer unknown to them, August Frühling, and "shot and killed in their living room". Frühling was a member of the Lesum SA unit Reservesturm 29/411 under the command of the SA Obersturmführer Friedrich Jahns, who assisted in the killing of Martha and Adolph Goldberg.

Martha and Adolph Goldberg were buried in the Jewish cemetery in Ritterhude.

== Legal proceedings ==
The circumstances of the crime were not investigated by the public prosecutor, but rather by the NSDAP Supreme Party Court Special Division 6 (Sondersenat Nr. 6 des Obersten Parteigerichts der NSDAP). It was reported to be the "mood" of those involved that "the time for the full solution to the Jewish question was deemed to have come, and the few hours remaining before the following day had to be put to use". It was said that the men had acted in the certainty that such orders were only given in agreement with the highest places. Thus justified, the party court proceedings against the SA members and "fellow party members" August Frühling and those who gave his orders were dropped on 20 January 1939.

On 13 February, the highest party judge Walter Buch requested the Führer Adolf Hitler to quash the proceedings before the criminal courts: according to a determination by the Supreme Party Court, during the so-called "time of the struggle" it was common practice that the party leaders made some orders deliberately unclear, in order to remain in the background as the organizers of a particular operation. For active National Socialists, he argued, it was still normal to read more into an order than was actually said. "Improper motives" could not be established, and "those party members who overstepped the mark due to proper National Socialist belief and readiness for action should be protected".

August Frühling (1885–1966), the perpetrator, had been a ship's engineer. He was at sea from 1908 on, served in the First World War with the German Imperial Navy, and after 1920 worked as a mechanical engineer and operations manager for various companies, or was unemployed. Frühling joined the SA in 1933 and the NSDAP in 1937, and in 1938 was appointed SA Scharführer. The man who passed him his orders, Fritz Johann Köster (1906–1993), started out as a business clerk, joined the SA in 1932 and the NSDAP in 1933, was mayor of Lesum from 1834 to 1939, and then worked in the Bremen administration. From 1943 on, Köster was a senior civil servant, and finally a representative of the Bremen Construction Senator, and in 1944 he was appointed SS Obersturmbannführer. The man who gave Frühling his direct orders and his accomplice, Fredrich Jahns (1885–1939) was a master gardener, member of the SA and Obersturmführer for the SA Reservesturms 29/411 Lesum-Ritterhude. He died in 1939.

In 1948, Frühling, Köster, Walter Seggermann, Ernst Röschmann and further involved parties had to stand trial for the murders of Martha and Adolph Goldberg and Leopold Sinasohn before the Bremen District Court. Seggermann was sentenced to two and a half years and Röschmann to four years in prison, and the principle defendant Köster was sentenced to lifelong imprisonment. August Frühling received a sentence of ten years. As was also the case when the same court carried out proceedings against the murderers of the businessman Heinrich Rosenblum in the previous year, relatively mild convictions for manslaughter were given for various reasons: the defense pleaded "superior orders and disturbance of consciousness during the act", and the court considered it proven that the criterion for murder, premeditation (then, "Überlegung" in German, now referred to as "Vorsatz"), was not present.

Fritz Köster's life sentence was reduced to 15 years in an appeal hearing, and he was released early in 1953. He went on to work for the department store Horten AG in Düsseldorf and was employed as an advisor for the Lürssen-Werft shipyard in Bremen in the 1970s. August Frühling was pardoned by the Senate of Bremen in 1951, through the commutations of sentences for Nazi perpetrators that were stipulated by the US High Commissioner for Germany, John Jay McCloy. After this, from 1952, he returned to work as a ship's 'engineer.

== Impact and commemoration ==
=== Commemoration of victims ===
A process of coming to terms with the persecution of Jews during the Nazi period began rather hesitantly in Bremen at the end of the 1970s and first became accepted by the majority of the population in the 1980s. Accordingly, a plaque by the Bremen sculptor Claus Homfeld was first installed in 1982 at the Kolpinghaus on Kolpingstraße in the Schnoor district of Bremen, commemorating the synagogue that was set on fire and destroyed by National Socialists in 1938.

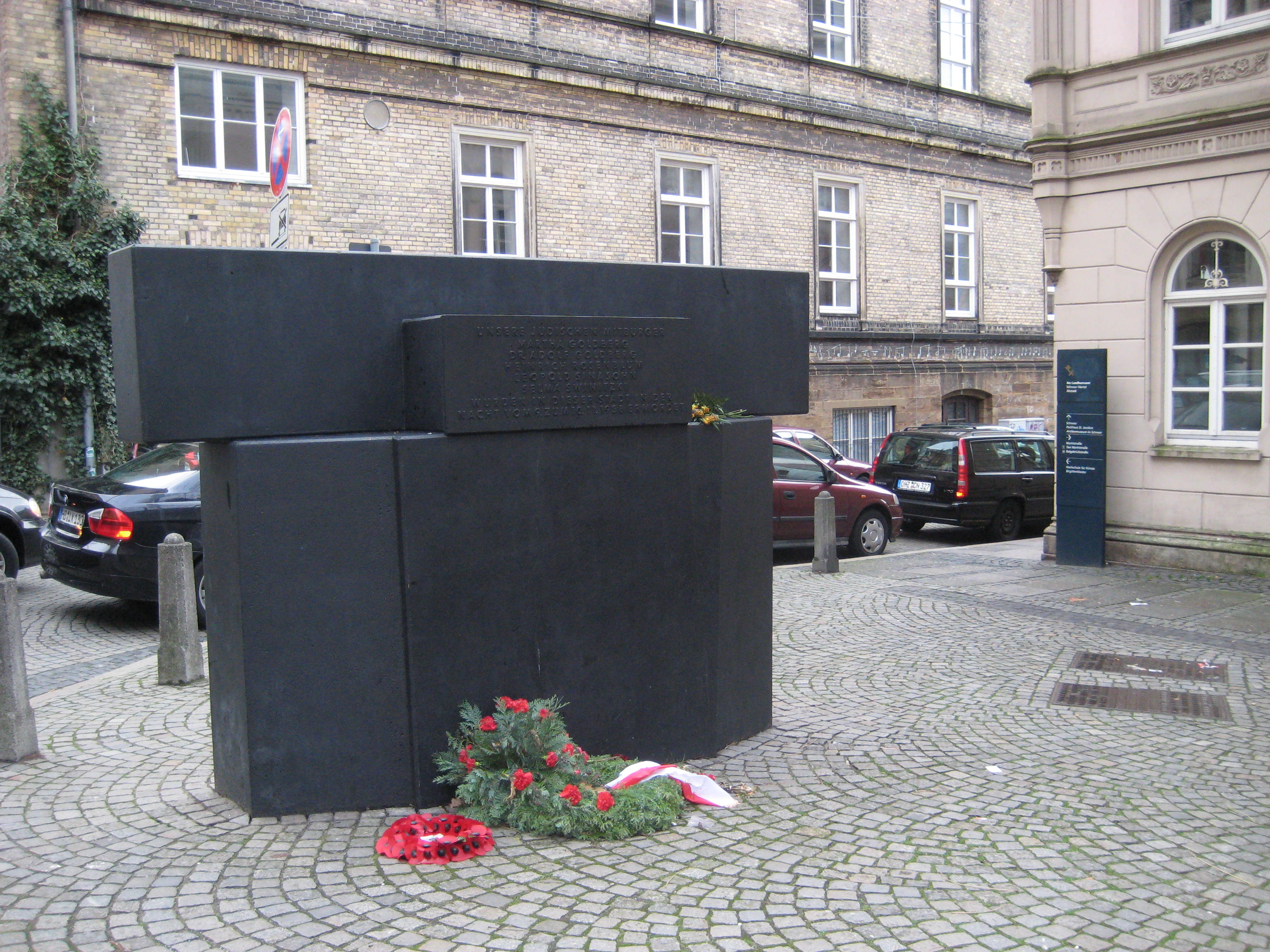
Memorial for the victims of Reichskristallnacht in front of the Landherrnamt building in the Schnoor district of Bremen.

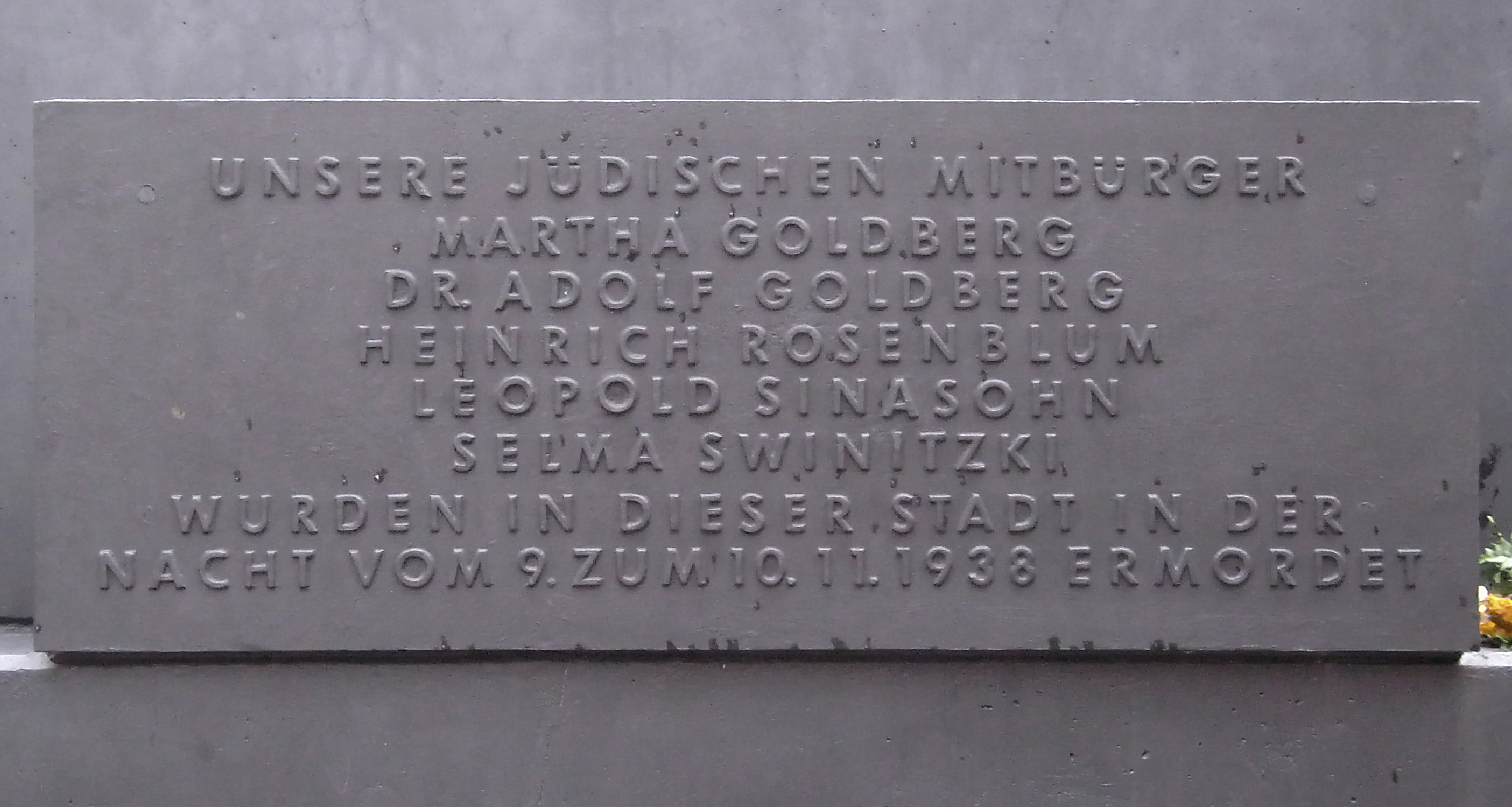
Plaque on the Memorial for the victims of Reichskristallnacht.

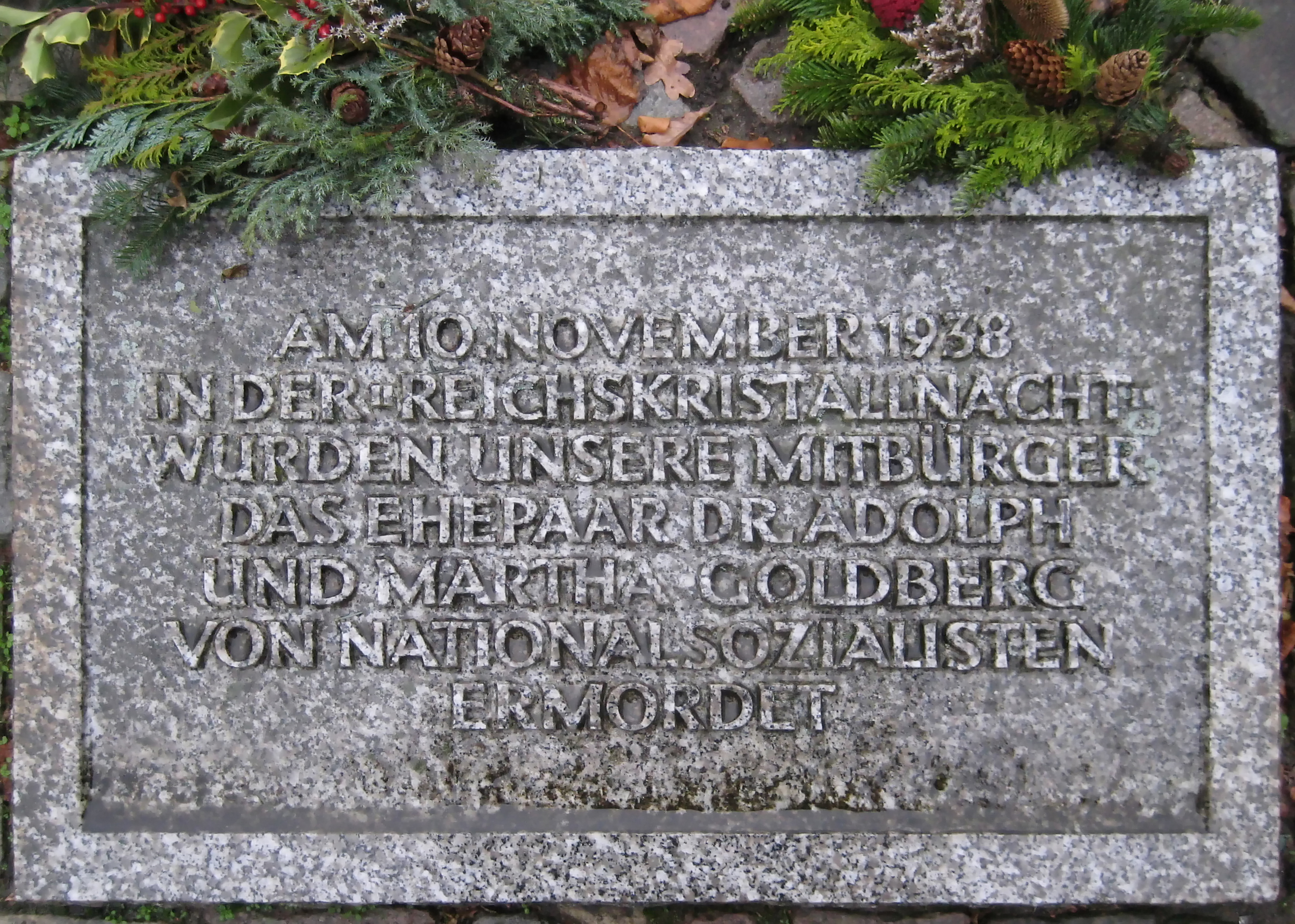
Commemorative stone in Goldbergplatz in Burgdamm, Bremen.

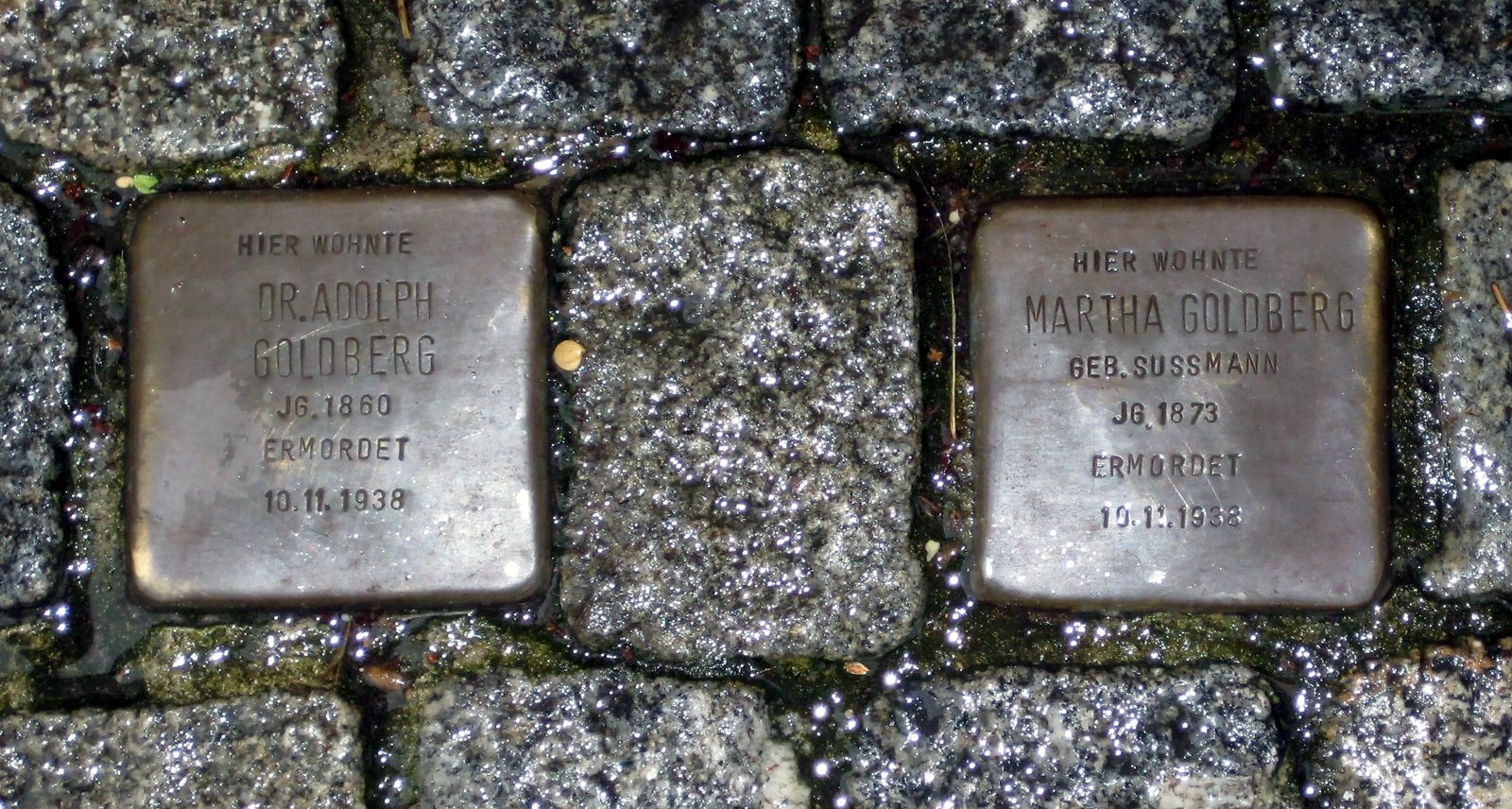
Stolpersteine in front of the house at 18 Bremerhavener Heerstraße, Burgdamm, Bremen.

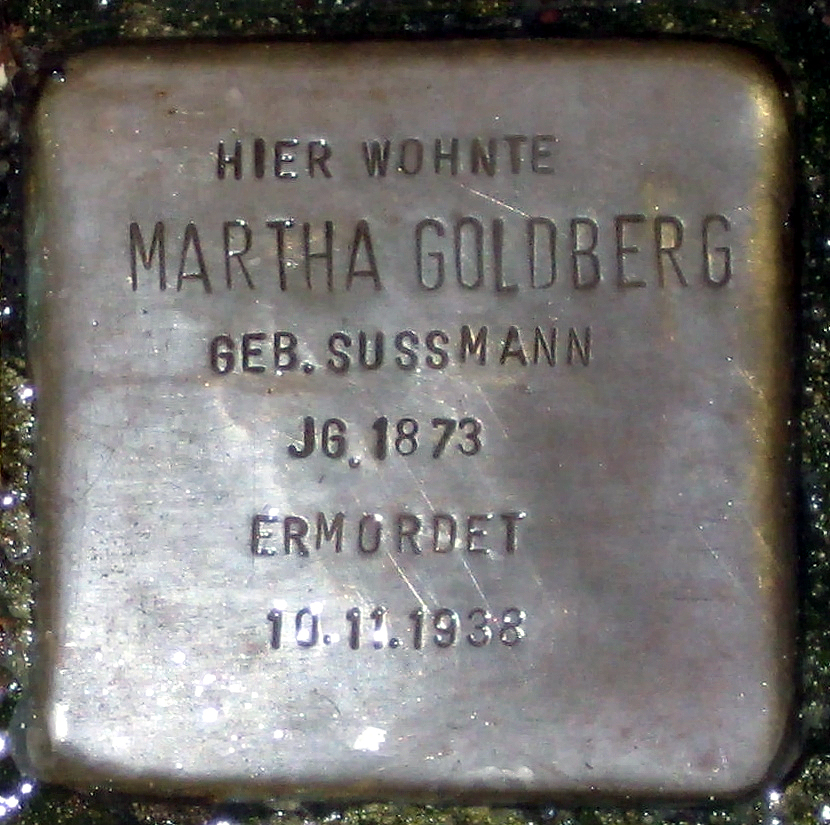
Stolperstein in memory of Martha Goldberg.

Also in 1982, not far from this former main synagogue of the Jewish community in Bremen the Memorial for the Victims of Reichskristallnacht was installed in front of the Landherrnamt building, in memory of Martha and Adolph Goldberg and the other three Jewish victims of Reichspogromnacht in Bremen and the surrounding area. The memorial was created according to a plan by Hans D. Voss, an informalist artist from Bremen. It is rendered in unadorned, cubic blocks of died-black concrete, and bears a commemorative plaque, with the inscription shown below in translation:

OUR FELLOW JEWISH CITIZENS
MARTHA GOLDBERG
DR. ADOLF GOLDBERG
HEINRICH ROSENBLUM
LEOPOLD SINASOHN
SELMA SWINITZKI
WERE MURDERED IN THIS TOWN
IN THE NIGHT BETWEEN THE
9TH AND 10TH OF NOVEMBER 1938

After an initiative by school children, a square between Bremerhavener Heerstraße and the corner Kellerstraße in the Bremen district of Burglesum was renamed Goldbergplatz in 1985. The Goldberg's home and doctor's practice had been nearby, on Bremerhavener Heerstraße, called Bahnhofstraße at the time.

In 1985, a memorial stone in Goldbergplatz was dedicated to the couple. It was set into the raised natural stone surface of a large, raised, circular flower bed. The memorial stone, which is made of granite, bears the inscription which has been translated below:

ON 10th NOVEMBER 1938
DURING "REICHSKRISTALLNACHT"
OUR FELLOW CITIZENS
THE MARRIED COUPLE DR. ADOLPH
AND MRS MARTHA GOLDBERG
WERE MURDERED
BY
NATIONAL SOCIALISTS

The nursery of the Jewish community in the district of Bremen-Schwachhausen, founded in 1997, bears the name Martha Goldberg.

On the anniversary of the murder, that is to say on 10 November 2005, the artist Gunter Demnig from Cologne laid two "Stolpersteine" in memory of the Goldbergs in Burgdamm, in the pavement outside the house at 18 Bremerhavener Heerstraße (previously 144 Bahnhofstraße), where the Goldbergs lived and Adolph Goldberg's doctor's practice was based. Demnig gave the brass top plate of the "Stolperstein" for Martha Goldberg the inscription shown below in translation:

HERE LIVED
MARTHA GOLDBERG
NÉE SUSSMANN
B. 1873
MURDERED
10.11.1938

To commemorate the victims of Reichspogromnacht and as a reminder of the crimes of National Socialism, the Nacht der Jugend (Youth Night) has taken place in Bremen each November since 1998. The historical town hall (a World Heritage Site) opens its doors to young people in particular, but also to older people. The event, which consists of a multitude of cultural and musical contributions, is put on regularly by several hundred young people, and attended by up to 2,500 visitors. The fate of the five Jewish victims of Reichspogromnacht from Bremen and the surrounding area – Martha and Adolph Goldberg, and Heinrich Rosenblum, Leopold Sinasohn, and Selma Swinitzki – is always discussed, and has been thematized already in different ways.

Together with the Jewish community, members of the Bürgerschaft of Bremen commemorate the local victims of Reichspogromnacht each year on 10 November, in a memorial at the Landherrnamt as well as in a central memorial ceremony in the town hall. There are remembrance ceremonies each year on 10 November at the memorial in Goldbergplatz, and some further memorial events also take place at other locations and memorial sites in Bremen, organized by institutions and societies such as the Association of Prosecutees of the Nazi Regime.

=== Significance ===
Public awareness for the historical-structural discourse around dealing with National Socialism in Germany took on new strength in the 1990s. Both the so-called Goldhagen Debate in 1996, about a "nation of perpetrators" and the controversy surrounding the Wehrmachtsaustellung, an exhibition that began in 1996/7on the involvement of the German army in Nazi-era atrocities, contributed to this.

This also stimulated research into individual cases as examples, in order to be able to assess the circumstances and the origins of acts of violence and crimes of National Socialists. Through this analysis of individual cases from different localities, a more concrete understanding of the victims and perpetrators of National Socialism in Germany that went over and above a "culture of commemoration" was reached. As such, since their first installations in 1993, Gunter Demnig's Stolpersteine have led in many places to individual, increasingly independent citizens' initiatives. The question of the impact of National Socialism in local neighborhoods also caught the interest of young people in particular.

The investigation into the fates of individuals has had the effect that individual victims of Nazism have been considered in terms of their personal significance in more detail than previously, and have begun to be viewed in their historical contexts, regardless of their status as victims. As such, Martha Goldberg is now regarded as one of the "most famous women in Bremen's history, who helped to shape the cultural and social life of the city" because of her extraordinary social conscience and her impact as an emancipated woman. Her fate has been discussed in many books and other publications, and is part of the public commemoration work as well as the discussion of National Socialism in Bremen and the surrounding areas, in particular in schools and for young people. In this way, she has played a part in making remembrance of the victims of Nazism more personal and more concrete.

== See also ==
- Women in Nazi Germany
- Kristallnacht

== Bibliography ==
- Christine Holzner-Rabe: Von Gräfin Emma und anderen Em(m)anzen. 2. Auflage, Verlag Carl Ed. Schünemann KG, Bremen 2007, ISBN 978-3-7961-1856-2, S. 91–92.
- Ulrike Puvogel u. a. (Hrsg.): Gedenkstätten für die Opfer des Nationalsozialismus. Eine Dokumentation, Band 1. 2., überarbeitete und erweiterte Auflage, Bundeszentrale für Politische Bildung, Bonn 1995, ISBN 3-89331-208-0, S. 209, 223. (Schriftenreihe der Bundeszentrale für Politische Bildung, Bd. 245)
- Hannelore Cyrus u. a. (Hrsg.): Bremer Frauen von A bis Z. Kurzbiographien. Verlag in der Sonnenstraße, Bremen 1991, ISBN 3-926768-02-9, S. 446–447.
- Wilhelm Lührs u. a.: "Reichskristallnacht" in Bremen – Vorgeschichte, Hergang und gerichtliche Bewältigung des Pogroms vom 9./10. November 1938. 2. Auflage, Hrsg.: Senator für Justiz und Verfassung der Freien Hansestadt Bremen u. a., Steintor Verlagsges., Bremen 1988, ISBN 3-926028-40-8, S. 39–59, 72–92.
- Rolf Rübsam: Sie lebten unter uns. Zum Gedenken an die Opfer der „Reichskristallnacht“ 1938 in Bremen und Umgebung. Hauschild Verlag, Bremen 1988, ISBN 3-926598-09-3, S. 15–50, 73–79, 104–119.
