= Ottilie Pohl =

German politician, resistance fighter against Nazism

Ottilie Pohl

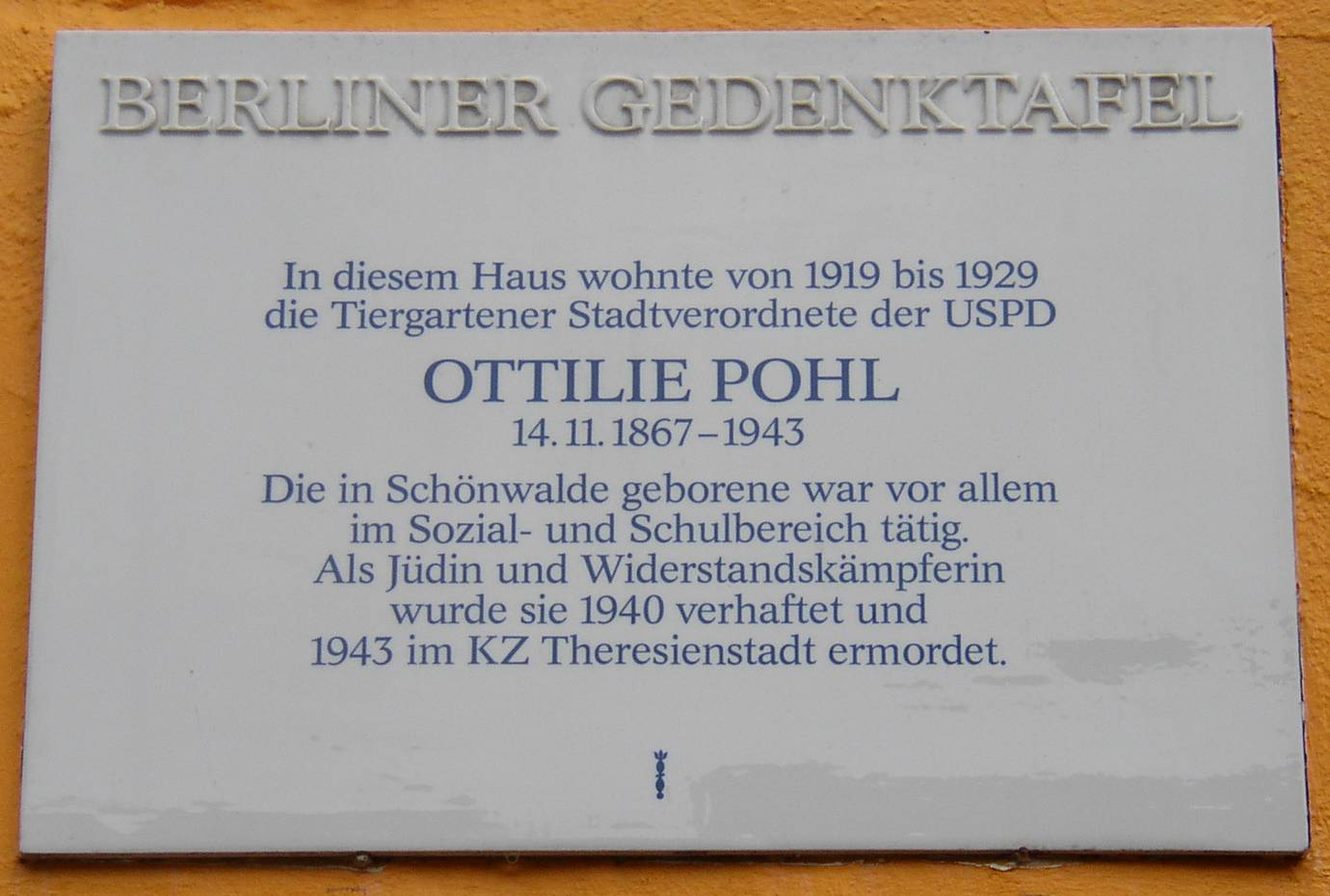
Memorial plaque for Ottilie Pohl in Moabit

Ottilie Pohl (née Levit, 14 November 1867 – 2 December 1943) was a German Jewish socialist politician and activist who participated in the German resistance to Nazism. She was born in Schönwald into a Jewish family. She worked as milliner and moved to Berlin. She married Wilhelm Pohl in 1893, they had two children; he died in 1915.

In 1890, upon the end of Bismarck's Anti-Socialist Laws, she joined the Social Democratic Party of Germany and became their delegate in Berlin-Moabit. Being opposed to the First World War, she distributed the Spartacus Letters and in 1917 changed affiliations to the USPD. In 1920 she was elected city councillor for that party in Berlin-Tiergarten. She was a member of the Konsumgenossenschaft Berlin supervisory board.

After the Nazi seizure of power in 1933, Pohl worked with a Rote Hilfe group to support victims of Nazi persecution and resistance fighters in prison or in hiding. The group also included Rosa Lindemann and other women.

Pohl was arrested in August 1940 for aiding the German communist and resistance fighter Rudolf Hallmeyer. She was sentenced to 8 months in prison, upon her release in 1941 she continued to engage in underground political activities. On 19 November 1942 she was arrested by the Gestapo, her possessions were seized and she was deported to Theresienstadt, where she died the following year.

Today, Ottilie Pohl is remembered with a memorial plaque (Beusselstr. 43). The former Ludendorffstraße in Tiergarten was renamed to Pohlstraße in her honour in 1947.
