= Hedwig Jahnow =

German teacher, theologian, and Holocaust victim

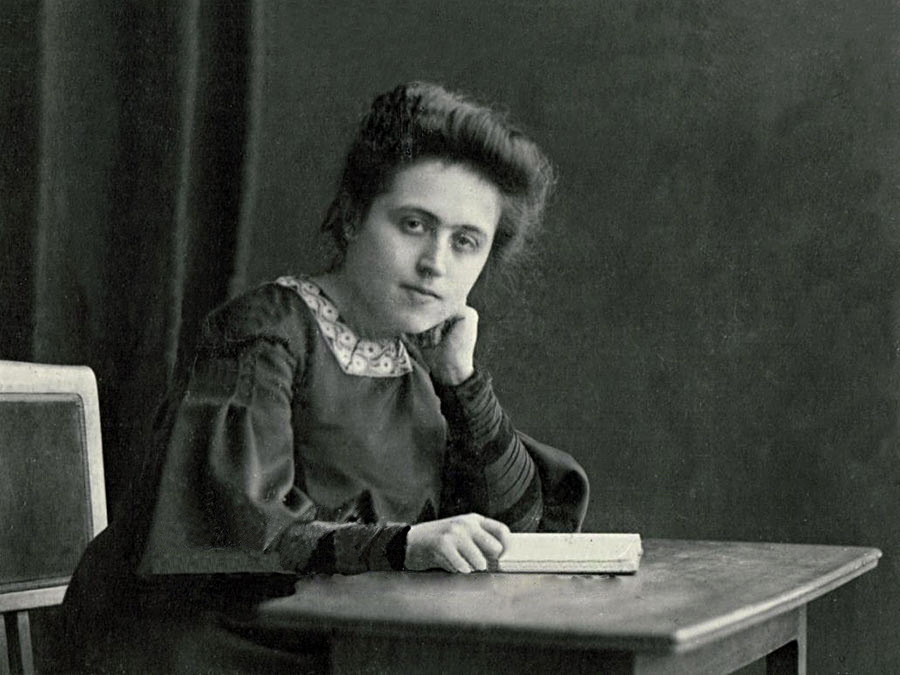

Hedwig Jahnow (21 March 1879 – 22 March 1944) was a German teacher and an Old Testament theologian who studied Rabbinic Dirge, specifically Kinah. In 1919 After winning an election in the first year that women were allowed to vote she became the first woman in the Marburg city council. She later became deputy headmistress of the Marburg Elisabeth School. Hedwig explored women's role in the Old Testament and contributed a number of works on this topic establishing herself as one of Germany's first female biblical scholars. Jahow's work has been cited by modern theologians as foundational to the modern study of the book of Lamentations.

== Family ==
Hedwig Jahnow was born Hedwig Inowraclawer, in Rawitsch. Her father Alfred, who was a teacher at the Oelser Gymnasium in Oleśnica, Silesia, In order to have a chance of becoming a civil servant gave up his original Jewish name of Aaron Inowraclawer and converted from the Jewish faith to the Protestant faith. Hedwig's brother, Reinhold Jahnow, was a German aviation pioneer who passed the pilot's test in 1911 and died in August 1914 as the first member of the Air Force (First Lieutenant of the Landwehr).

== Education ==
In November 1898, at the age of 19, Hedwig passed the teacher's examination allowing her to teach at girl's middle school. From 1895 to 1898 she attended a private teacher training college in Berlin for three years and then again from autumn 1899 to spring 1900. In the summer of 1903 she held her first two teaching positions at two girls' schools in Berlin. From 1903 to 1906 she completed a six-semester course as a guest student at the University of Berlin. In November 1906 she passed the senior teacher exam for history and religion. At this time in the Weimar Republic it was not yet possible for women to hold university chairs or to obtain a degree in a field unrelated to social sciences. In 1907 After successfully completing her exams, she applied for and was granted the position of an academically trained senior teacher at the Elisabeth School in Marburg.

In 1925 Jahnow was promoted to senior teacher and appointed deputy headmistress of the Elisabeth School. A year later, the University of Gießen (then still Ludwig's University) honored her with an honorary doctorate (licentiate) from the Faculty of Theology for her academic work, especially in the field of the Old Testament.

In 1935 she was forced out of her position as deputy headmistress by the National Socialists and then was forcibly retired at the end of 1935 due to her Jewish ancestry. She was forcibly retired under § 4, paragraph 2 of the First Ordinance on the Reich Citizenship Law of November 14, 1935: which states "Jewish civil servants will retire after December 31, 1935." She was released from teaching with a monthly salary of 234 RM.

== Imprisonment and death ==
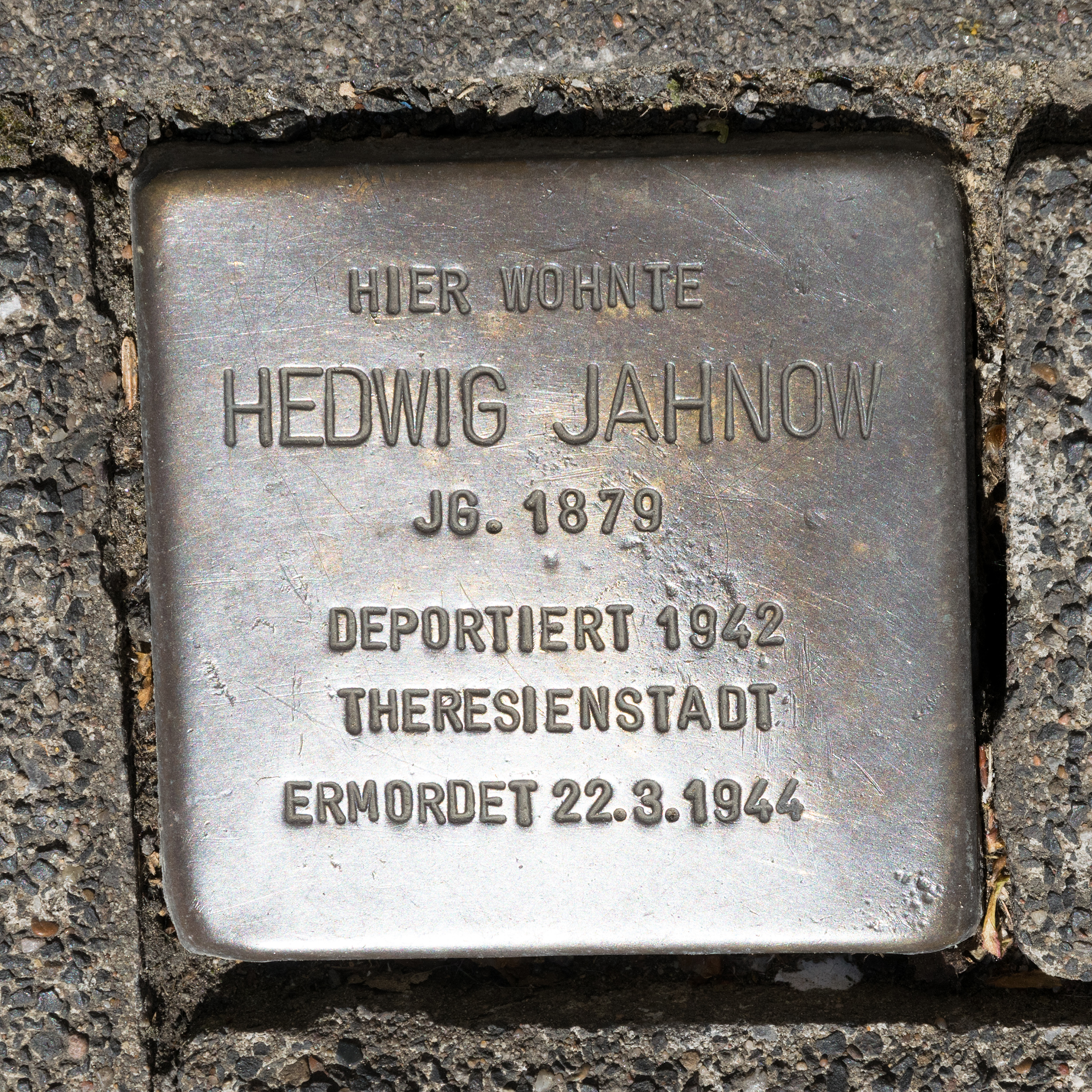

At the end of 1938 due to the increasing anti-Jewish law in Germany leading up to The Holocaust Jahnow tried to emigrate to England, but the then 59-year-old was rejected by the authorities in England on the basis of her old age. In June 1942, Jahnow and a roommate, who were reported to authorities by a third roommate, were sentenced to five years in prison for listening to enemy radio stations. On September 7, 1942, Jahnow was deported along with other people of Jewish descent from Marburg to Theresienstadt, where she died of malnutrition on March 22, 1944, one day after her 65th birthday. She was buried in an urn numbered 22710.

== Publications ==
Die Frau im Alten Testament (The women in the Old Testament) 1914 Essay

Jahnow, H. (1923). Das hebräische Leichenlied im Rahmen der Völkerdichtung (The Hebraic funeral dirge within folklore). Giessen: Töpelmann.
