= Johnny & Jones =

Dutch jazz duo

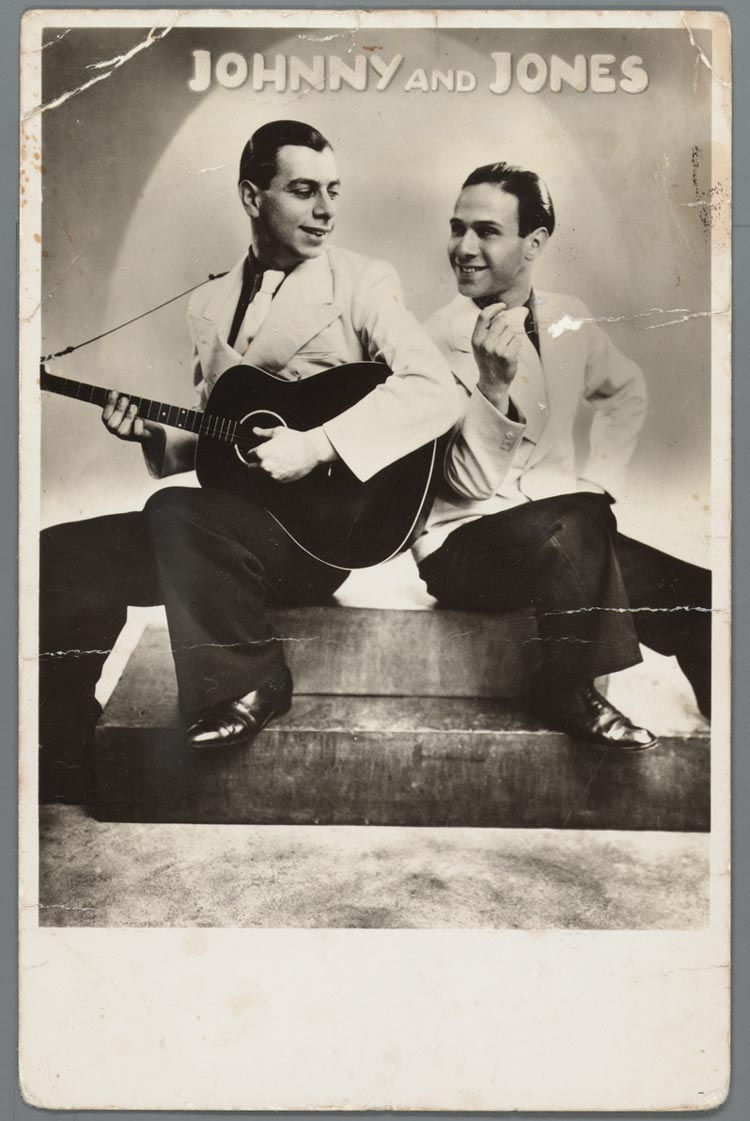
Johnny and Jones, 1938

Johnny & Jones is the name of the Amsterdam jazz-duo Nol (Arnold Siméon) van Wesel (Johnny) (3 August 1918 – 15 April 1945) and Max (Salomon Meyer) Kannewasser (Jones) (24 September 1916 – 20 March 1945).

Van Wesel and Kannewasser worked together at the De Bijenkorf department store. In 1934 they were discovered while they were playing during a company party with the quartet The Bijko Rhythm Stompers. Two years later they quit their jobs and began performing under the name Johnny & Jones. Their biggest hit was "Mijnheer Dinges weet niet wat swing is" ("Mister Dingus doesn't know what swing is"). They made jazz music accompanied by the guitar, and their lyrics, invariably pronounced with an American accent, were characterized by humorous, topical parodies. Beginning in 1937 they were regularly played on the VARA-radio and became immensely popular.

Because they were Jews, during the German occupation, Johnny & Jones could only play for Jewish audiences, and after 1941 were not allowed to play at all. In 1943 they and their wives were arrested and sent to the Westerbork transit camp. In the camp they performed once under the name Jonny und Jones since in the revue only the German language was allowed. In 1944 they were sent on a day's work assignment from Westerbork to Amsterdam, during which they managed to clandestinely record the song "Westerbork Serenade". In the camp their job was to dismantle crashed warplanes.

On 4 September 1944 Van Wesel and Kannewasser were deported on one of the last transports from Westerbork to a series of concentration camps: Theresienstadt, Auschwitz, Sachsenhausen, Ohrdruf and Bergen-Belsen. They died of exhaustion during the last days of the war in 1945, Johnny on 15 April, the day that the camp was liberated.
