= Landherrnamt =

Building in Bremen, Germany

Coordinates: 53°4′26″N 8°48′32″E

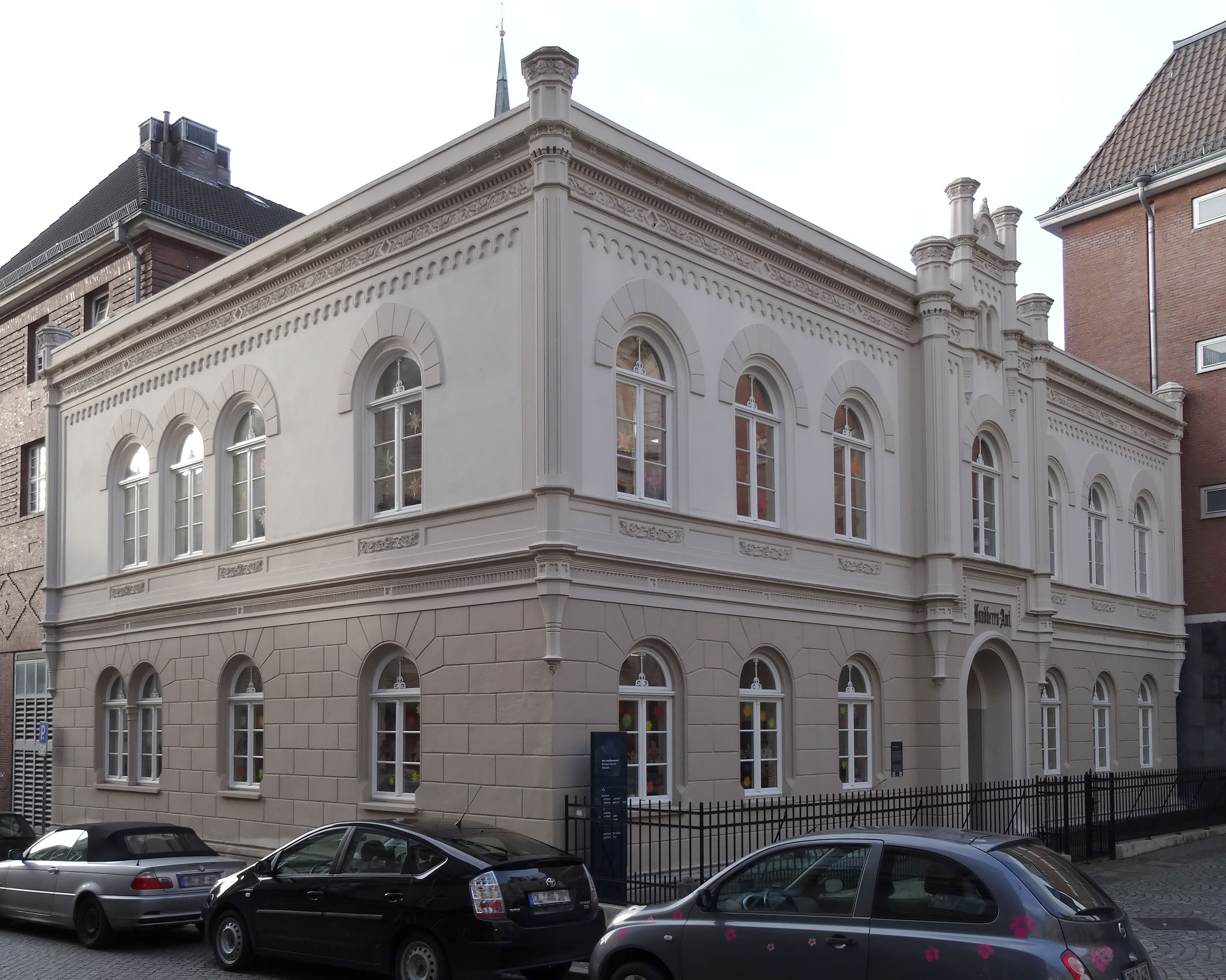
Landherrnamt, Bremen (1856)

The Landherrnamt is a building in the Schnoor district of Bremen, Germany, which was designed by Alexander Schröder in the Neo-Romanesque style and completed in 1856.

== History ==
The building was designed by Bremen's planning director, Alexander Schröder (1806–1877), who planned several buildings in the city including the St-Jürgen Clinique. His style embraced Neoclassisism and Romanesque Revival architecture. The building initially housed the offices of the Landherrn who administered the State of Bremen from 1850. Until the end of the Second World War it accommodated the police and administrative services as well as the dike authorities. After the war, with its 1,000 m^{2} (11,000 sq ft) of floor space, it was used as a welfare centre for the severely disabled as well as the headquarters of the Bremen Dike Authority. In 1964, the Catholic Church took the building over as a nunnery but later used it to accommodate classes from the St. Johannis School. In 2011, major repairs were carried out to improve conditions for the schoolchildren. The 150-year-old facade was also renovated, the former pink finish being removed to reveal the natural colour of the sandstone.
