= Ljuba Monastirskaja =

Latvian textile artist

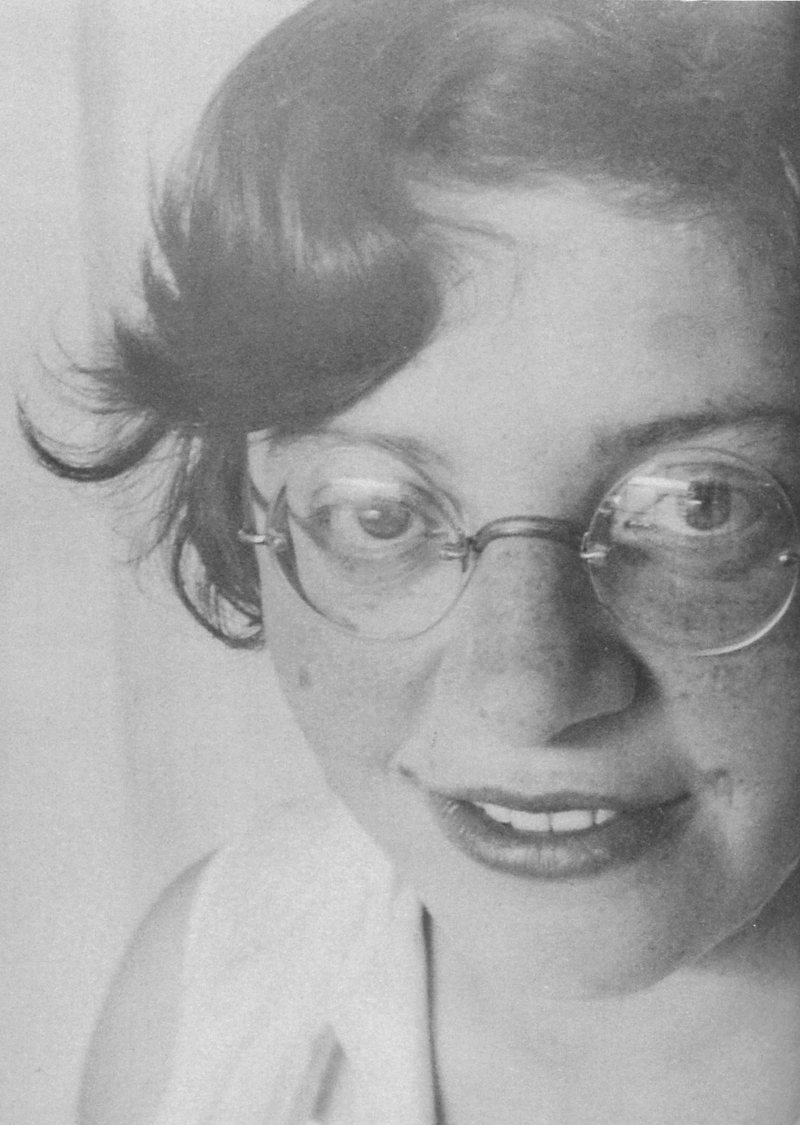
- Ljuba Monastirskaja c. 1926
- Born: 25 September 1906; Riga, Russian Empire
- Died: 30 November 1941 (aged 35); Rumbula
- Education: Bauhaus 1926–1930
- Known for: Textile design, weaving
- Spouse: Natan Kirsh

Ljuba Monastirskaja (25 September 1906 – 30 November 1941) was a Latvian textile artist. She was a victim of the Rumbula massacre in 1941.

== Biography ==
Monastirskaja was born into a secular Jewish family. Her father was a merchant who had moved to Riga from Chernihiv, Russian Empire (today Ukraine) to escape the 1903–1906 wave of pogroms.

Her upbringing in Riga during the late 1910s was affected by dramatic events related to World War I. As a teenager, Monastirskaja studied at the Jewish secular school in Riga, where she graduated in 1924. Two years later, in October 1926, she began studies at the Bauhaus School of Art, Design and Architecture in Dessau. Her teachers included Josef Albers, Gunta Stölzl, Marcel Breuer and Georg Muche.

Like most other female students at Bauhaus, she was put in the weaving workshop. There she could develop both her craft skills as well as new industrial weaving techniques developed for mass production, largely inspired by constructivism. She was photographed many times during her time at Bauhaus. One well-known photograph shows female students standing in a staircase of the Bauhaus building. Monastirskaja can be seen in the background beside Gunta Stölzl and just above Otti Berger. A few of her creations are still in existence, such as three work samples held by the Textile Museum in Tilburg, Netherlands.

Once she had completed her education, Monastirskaja started working for two well known German textile producers, first in Mössingen and then in Sagan. A certificate of 18 April 1932 stated that her job responsibilities included the preparation of the artistic designs of "decorative and padding fabrics in formal and technical terms". Her ambition was to continue to live and work in Germany, but the rise to power of the Nazis would stop that. In 1933, she was arrested and deported to Latvia.

A short time after returning to Latvia, she married architect Natan Kirsh in 1934, who also had a Jewish upbringing. Following the Ulmanis coup d'état, Monastirskaja had trouble establishing her practice as a textile producer. Her modern designs were not high in demand as the new nationalist regime promoted Latvian specific designs based on folkloristic traditions. Furthermore, she belonged to two minorities which were marginalised in 1930s Latvia: both Russian-speaking and Jewish.

In 1941, once Nazi Germany had invaded Latvia, the persecution of Latvian Jews begun. Monastirskaja was placed along with over 40,000 Jews in the specially built Riga Ghetto. Her husband had earlier been abducted and taken to Biķernieki.

== Death ==
On 30 November 1941, Monastirskaja, along with 12,000 others, was moved from the ghetto to a forest ten kilometres southeast of Riga. Here she was forced into a mass grave and shot dead in an atrocity that would later become known as the Rumbula massacre. The massacre was carried out by the Nazi Einsatzgruppe A with the help of local collaborators of the Arajs Kommando. All of her belongings and artistic works were destroyed or lost.
