= Lisl Frank =

- Born: Alice Frankl; 22 January 1911; Prague, Austria-Hungary
- Died: 4 October 1944 (aged 33); Christianstadt death march
- Occupations: Singer, dancer, actress
- Years active: 1933–1944
- Spouse: Otto Aufrichtig (m. 1933–1944)

Lisl Frank (22 January 1911 – 4 October 1944) was a Czech Jewish singer, dancer and actress. She achieved success before World War II.

Born Alice Frankl in Prague, she met her future husband, Otto Aufrichtig (stage name Otto Aurich) in 1933 when he took over as director of the Neues Stadttheater in Teplitz-Schonau [Teplice] where she was appearing as a singer, dancer and actress. Their Teplice stage partnership proved to be a winning combination and after marrying in Czechoslovakia, she and Otto moved to his home city of Vienna.

With the Nazis rise to power, they curtailed their own success in Vienna and made the decision to move to the Netherlands, where they became members of the Fritz Hirsch Operetta in Den Haag. They were an instant success, staying on with the company until 1938. When they left, it was to become members of a new opera company, the Plaza Theater in the Hollandsche Schouwburg, which had been founded in Amsterdam. They were the stars of the company but their success could not prevent the Plaza Theater from going bankrupt.

They immediately bounced back with a new opera company in the Hollandsche Schouwburg in The Capital, led by Otto Frohn Knecht, in which they co-starred with celebrated artists of the period, Sylvain Poons and Kurt Gerron. This, too, was destined not to last. Following German occupation of the Netherlands and the tight restrictions forced upon Jews, the Nazis decreed in November 1941 that the Hollandsche Schouwburg would be renamed the Joodsche Schouwburg [Jewish Theatre], and star Jewish performers no longer permitted to appear before non-Jewish audiences.

In March 1939, she and Otto joined the Rudolf Nelson Revue, and it was with Rudolf's piano accompaniment that the pair cut their own recorded titles – Die Damenschuhe von Zimmer Nr. 20 (Aurich) and Männer, Männer, Männer! (Frank). These selections made their CD debut exactly 60 years later on the release Und Rudi Macht Musik Dazu.

During 1940 and 1941 Lisl appeared in Kabarett der Prominente followed by the Joodsche Schowburg in 1942.

The couple were still living in Amsterdam when they were deported by the Nazis to Westerbork concentration camp, where between March and June 1944, they took part in three productions staged by the Westerbork stage troupe, some of whose other members were Max Ehrlich, Kurt Gerron, Jetty Cantor, Willi Rosen and Erich Ziegler.

She and Otto were subsequently deported from Westerbork to Theresienstadt, then to Auschwitz on 4 October 1944. From Auschwitz, Lisl was among those forced to march to Christianstadt, where she died.

Otto survived the war and returned to Amsterdam where he re-established himself as a singer, dancer, choreographer and director of the city's Hoofdstad Operette.
