= Gymnastics at the 2000 Summer Olympics – Women's artistic qualification =

These are the results of the women's qualification round, the preliminary round which decided the finalists for all six events for women in artistic gymnastics at the 2000 Summer Olympics in Sydney. The qualification round took place on September 17 at the Sydney SuperDome.

The top twelve teams from the 1999 World Artistic Gymnastics Championships completed for places in the team final. Each team was allowed to bring up to six gymnasts. During qualification, each team could have up to five gymnasts compete on each apparatus, and could count the four highest scores for the team total. The six teams with the highest scores in the qualification round advanced to the team final.

Individual gymnasts, including those who were not part of a team, competed for places in the all-around and apparatus finals. The thirty-six gymnasts with the highest scores in the all-around advanced to that final, except that each country could only send three gymnasts to the all-around final. The eight gymnasts with the highest scores on each apparatus advanced to those finals, except that each country could only send two gymnasts to each apparatus final.

In total, 97 gymnasts from 32 countries competed in the qualification round.

== Results ==
Team/Gymnast	Nation	Vault		Uneven Bars		Balance Beam		Floor		Total	
Team/Gymnast	Nation	Score	Rank	Score	Rank	Score	Rank	Score	Rank	Score	Rank
Russia		38.454	1	38.974	2	38.773	2	38.673	1	154.874	1
Svetlana Khorkina	Russia	9.731	3	9.850	1	9.662	12	9.762	2	39.005	1
Yekaterina Lobaznyuk	Russia	9.637	6	9.675	16	9.762	3	9.612	12	38.686	4
Elena Produnova	Russia	9.368	25	9.762	5	9.762	5	9.637	9	38.529	5
Elena Zamolodchikova	Russia	9.612	9	9.687	11	9.375	38	9.662	7	38.336	7
Anastasiya Kolesnikova	Russia			9.625	25	9.587	20			19.212	81
Anna Chepeleva	Russia	9.474	14					9.425	27	18.899	84
Romania		38.343	2	38.287	8	38.912	1	38.449	2	153.991	2
Andreea Răducan	Romania	9.743	2	9.562	34	9.675	10	9.737	3	38.717	2
Simona Amânar	Romania	9.725	4	9.550	36	9.625	15	9.800	1	38.700	3
Maria Olaru	Romania	9.625	8	9.225	61	9.787	1	9.575	17	38.212	10
Loredana Boboc	Romania	9.250	40	9.550	37	9.675	10	9.337	31	37.812	17
Andreea Isărescu	Romania	9.193	45	9.625	26					18.818	86
Claudia Presăcan	Romania					9.775	2	8.925	61	18.700	88
Ukraine		37.067	7	38.836	3	38.524	3	37.487	6	151.914	4
Olga Roshchupkina	Ukraine	9.262	37	9.712	8	9.625	18	9.575	16	38.174	11
Viktoria Karpenko	Ukraine	9.250	39	9.787	3	9.537	26	9.300	36	37.874	16
Halyna Tyryk	Ukraine	8.974	68	9.650	22	9.500	28	9.337	32	37.461	25
Tatiana Yarosh	Ukraine	8.818	75	9.512	41	9.712	6	9.275	41	37.317	29
Olga Teslenko	Ukraine			9.687	12	9.650	14	9.162	48	28.499	67
Alona Kvasha	Ukraine	9.581	11							9.581	93
Spain		38.097	3	38.612	4	36.987	11	37.862	5	151.558	5
Esther Moya	Spain	9.768	1	9.637	24	9.175	58	9.700	5	38.280	8
Laura Martínez	Spain	9.649	5	9.650	20	9.250	51	9.612	12	38.161	12
Sara Moro	Spain	9.243	41	9.625	27	9.562	21	9.275	42	37.705	19
Susana García	Spain			9.700	10	9.000	65	9.275	40	27.975	71
Marta Cusidó	Spain	9.100	56	9.050	70	8.962	66			27.112	76
Paloma Moro	Spain	9.437	18					8.625	70	18.062	90
United States		37.654	4	38.562	5	37.861	6	37.362	8	151.439	6
Elise Ray	United States	9.468	16	9.687	12	9.687	9	9.225	45	38.067	13
Amy Chow	United States	9.468	15	9.400	49	9.625	16	9.525	22	38.018	14
Kristen Maloney	United States	9.225	43	9.575	32	9.312	45	9.525	21	37.637	20
Dominique Dawes	United States	9.393	22	9.675	17	8.600	73	9.087	52	36.755	41
Tasha Schwikert	United States			9.625	28	9.237	53			18.862	85
Jamie Dantzscher	United States	9.325	30					8.987	59	18.312	89
Australia		36.423	12	38.561	6	37.736	8	38.337	4	151.057	7
Lisa Skinner	Australia	9.156	47	9.687	12	9.162	59	9.725	4	37.730	18
Allana Slater	Australia	8.268	82	9.675	17	9.387	37	9.625	10	36.955	39
Brooke Walker	Australia	8.368	81	9.562	35	9.175	57	9.375	28	36.480	44
Trudy McIntosh	Australia	9.506	12			9.612	19	9.612	11	28.730	66
Alexandra Croak	Australia			9.275	56	9.562	22	9.250	44	28.087	70
Melinda Cleland	Australia	9.393	21	9.637	23					19.030	82
France		36.823	9	37.912	9	38.100	5	37.249	9	150.084	8
Delphine Regease	France	9.150	48	9.212	62	9.625	17	9.562	18	37.549	24
Alexandra Soler	France	9.318	32	9.475	44	9.375	41	9.050	55	37.218	30
Nelly Ramassamy	France	9.212	44	9.212	63	9.550	25	9.050	56	37.024	35
Elvire Teza	France	8.950	69	9.700	9	9.550	24	8.762	67	36.962	37
Anne-Sophie Endeler	France	9.143	49			9.375	40	9.587	15	28.105	69
Ludivine Furnon	France			9.525	40					9.525	94
Canada		36.654	10	38.311	7	37.811	7	37.111	10	149.887	9
Yvonne Tousek	Canada	9.131	52	9.662	19	9.537	27	9.550	19	37.880	15
Kate Richardson	Canada	9.287	34	9.612	29	9.075	61	9.362	29	37.336	28
Lise Leveille	Canada	8.912	72	9.400	50	9.425	34	8.587	71	36.324	51
Julie Beaulieu	Canada	9.093	58	9.587	30	9.412	35	7.912	80	36.004	52
Michelle Conway	Canada	9.143	50	9.450	45			9.612	13	28.205	68
Crystal Gilmore	Canada					9.437	33			9.437	95
Great Britain		37.086	6	37.449	12	37.536	9	37.412	7	149.483	10
Lisa Mason	Great Britain	9.231	42	9.350	55	9.662	13	9.337	30	37.580	22
Annika Reeder	Great Britain	9.331	28	9.437	47	9.275	50	9.325	34	37.368	27
Emma Williams	Great Britain	9.187	46	9.262	58	9.237	52	9.275	39	36.961	38
Sharna Murray	Great Britain	9.056	62	9.400	51	9.362	42			27.818	72
Kelly Hackman	Great Britain			9.262	57	9.212	55	8.900	62	27.374	74
Paula Thomas	Great Britain	9.337	27					9.475	26	18.812	87
Italy		36.853	8	37.574	11	37.362	10	36.849	11	148.638	11
Monica Bergamelli	Italy	9.449	17	9.387	52	9.325	43	9.300	37	37.461	26
Adriana Crisci	Italy	8.937	71	9.500	43	9.437	32	9.312	35	37.186	31
Martina Bremini	Italy	9.043	63	9.550	38	9.275	49	9.137	50	37.005	36
Irene Castelli	Italy	9.037	64	9.075	67	8.812	70	8.437	78	35.361	56
Alice Capitani	Italy	9.324	31			9.325	44	9.100	51	27.749	73
Laura Trefiletti	Italy			9.137	65					9.137	96
Belarus		36.617	11	37.874	10	36.187	12	35.900	12	146.578	12
Alena Polozkova	Belarus	9.106	55	9.575	31	9.375	39	9.500	23	37.556	23
Marina Zarzhitskaya	Belarus	9.431	20	9.237	59	9.050	62	9.050	57	36.768	40
Tatyana Zharganova	Belarus	9.018	66	9.712	7	9.212	54	8.500	77	36.442	46
Natalya Naranovich	Belarus	8.949	70	9.350	54			8.850	64	27.149	75
Tatyana Grigorenko	Belarus	9.062	60			8.425	79	7.200	83	24.687	79
Anna Meisak	Belarus			8.812	76	8.550	74			17.362	91
Yang Yun	China	9.229	33	9.775	4	9.700	8	9.650	8	38.424	6
Liu Xuan	China	8.893	74	9.650	21	9.712	7	9.337	33	37.592	21
Ling Jie	China	9.268	35	9.812	2	9.762	4			28.842	65
Huang Mandan	China			9.762	5			9.487	24	19.249	80
Kui Yuanyuan	China	9.381	23					9.550	20	18.931	83
Kana Yamawaki	Japan	9.356	26	9.500	42	9.025	64	9.300	38	37.181	32
Jana Komrsková	Czech Republic	9.500	13	9.537	39	9.562	23	8.525	76	37.124	33
Daniele Hypólito	Brazil	9.325	29	9.062	69	9.462	30	9.262	43	37.111	34
Mok Un-Ju	North Korea	9.031	65	9.237	60	9.475	29	8.825	66	36.568	42
Sigrid Persoon	Belgium	9.437	19	9.150	64	8.862	68	9.062	54	36.511	43
Oksana Chusovitina	Uzbekistan	9.375	24	8.450	80	9.150	60	9.475	25	36.450	45
Irina Yevdokimova	Kazakhstan	9.131	51	9.062	68	9.037	63	9.187	47	36.417	47
Melina Sirolli	Argentina	9.256	38	9.037	71	8.950	67	9.162	49	36.405	48
Camila Comin	Brazil	9.112	54	9.450	46	9.200	56	8.562	74	36.324	49
Arlen Lovera	Venezuela	9.087	59	9.362	53	9.300	47	8.575	73	36.324	50
Julija Kovaliova	Lithuania	8.737	78	9.575	33	8.462	77	9.225	46	35.999	53
Miho Takenaka	Japan	9.125	53	8.750	77	9.300	46	8.725	69	35.900	54
Vasiliki Millousi	Greece	8.987	67	9.037	72	8.612	72	8.962	60	35.598	55
Laura Robertson	New Zealand	8.899	73	8.600	78	8.837	69	9.012	58	35.348	57
Choi Mi-Sun	South Korea	9.056	61	8.537	79	8.662	71	9.075	53	35.330	58
Zuzana Sekerová	Slovakia	8.743	77	9.087	66	9.462	30	7.325	81	34.617	59
Joanna Skowrońska	Poland	8.750	76	8.962	74	8.450	78	8.425	79	34.587	60
Aikaterini Christoforidou	Greece	9.099	57	8.125	82	8.525	76	8.750	68	34.499	61
Mojca Mavrič	Slovenia	8.512	80	8.212	81	8.525	75	8.825	65	34.074	62
Kateřina Marešová	Czech Republic	8.118	83	8.975	73	9.387	36	7.212	82	33.692	63
Gharde Geldenhuys	Namibia	8.537	79	7.662	83	7.762	81	8.575	72	32.536	64
Adrienn Nyeste	Hungary	9.262	36	8.850	75			8.875	63	26.987	77
Son Un-Hui	North Korea			9.425	48	8.212	80	8.537	75	26.174	78
Denisse López	Mexico	9.631	7							9.631	92
Yen Au Li	Malaysia			6.525	84					6.525	97

Note: In April 2010, the IOC and FIG disqualified the Chinese team from the all-around team event after discovering member Dong Fangxiao was only 14 years old at the time of the Olympics, with Dong's results from the 1999 World Championships and 2000 Olympic Games being deleted from the records.

== Finalists ==
=== Team all-around ===
Rank	Team	Total
1	Russia	154.874
2	Romania	153.991
3	Ukraine	151.914
4	Spain	151.558
5	United States	151.439

Note: In April 2010, the IOC and FIG disqualified the Chinese team after it was discovered that team member Dong Fangxiao was only 14 at the time of the Olympics.

=== Individual all-around ===
Rank	Gymnast	Total
1	Svetlana Khorkina (RUS)	39.005
2	Andreea Răducan (ROU)	38.717
3	Simona Amânar (ROU)	38.700
4	Yekaterina Lobaznyuk (RUS)	38.686
5	Elena Produnova (RUS)	38.529
6	Yang Yun (CHN)	38.424
8	Esther Moya (ESP)	38.280
9	Maria Olaru (ROU)	38.212
10	Olga Roschupkina (UKR)	38.174
11	Laura Martinez (ESP)	38.161
12	Elise Ray (USA)	38.067
13	Amy Chow (USA)	38.018
14	Yvonne Tousek (CAN)	37.880
15	Viktoria Karpenko (UKR)	37.874
17	Lisa Skinner (AUS)	37.730
18	Sara Moro (ESP)	37.705
19	Kristen Maloney (USA)	37.637
20	Liu Xuan (CHN)	37.592
21	Lisa Mason (GBR)	37.580
22	Alyona Polozkova (BLR)	37.556
23	Delphine Regease (FRA)	37.549
24	Galina Tyryk (UKR)	37.461
24	Monica Bergamelli (ITA)	37.461
26	Annika Reeder (GBR)	37.368
27	Kate Richardson (CAN)	37.336
29	Alexandra Soler (FRA)	37.218
30	Adriana Crisci (ITA)	37.186
31	Kana Yamawaki (JPN)	37.181
32	Jana Komrsková (CZE)	37.124
33	Daniele Hypólito (BRA)	37.111
34	Nelly Ramassamy (FRA)	37.024
35	Martina Bremini (ITA)	37.005
37	Emma Williams (GBR)	36.961
38	Allana Slater (AUS)	36.955
39	Marina Zarzhitskaya (BLR)	36.768

Note: In April 2010, the results of Dong Fangxiao from this event were deleted from the records after she was found to be 14 at the time of the Olympics.

=== Vault ===
Rank	Gymnast	Score
1	Esther Moya (ESP)	9.768
2	Andreea Răducan (ROU)	9.743
3	Svetlana Khorkina (RUS)*	9.731
4	Simona Amânar (ROU)	9.725
5	Laura Martinez (ESP)	9.649
6	Yekaterina Lobaznyuk (RUS)	9.637
7	Denisse López (MEX)	9.631

*Khorkina withdrew from the final so that her teammate Elena Zamolodchikova, who finished ninth in qualification, would take her place as she had more chances to win a gold medal.

Note: In April 2010, the results of Dong Fangxiao from this event were deleted from the records after she was found to be 14 at the time of the Olympics.

=== Uneven Bars ===
Rank	Gymnast	Gymnast
1	Svetlana Khorkina (RUS)	9.850
2	Ling Jie (CHN)	9.812
3	Victoria Karpenko (UKR)	9.787
4	Yang Yun (CHN)	9.775
5	Elena Produnova (RUS)	9.762
6	Tatiana Zharganova (BLR)	9.712
7	Olga Roshupkina (UKR)	9.712
8	Elvire Teza (FRA)	9.700

=== Balance Beam ===
Rank	Gymnast	Score
1	Maria Olaru (ROU)	9.787
2	Claudia Presecan (ROU)	9.775
3	Yekaterina Lobaznyuk (RUS)	9.762
4	Ling Jie (CHN)	9.762
5	Elena Produnova (RUS)	9.762
6	Tetyana Yarosh (UKR)	9.712
7	Liu Xuan (CHN)	9.712
8	Elise Ray (USA)	9.687

=== Floor ===
Rank	Gymnast	Score
1	Simona Amânar (ROU)	9.800
2	Svetlana Khorkina (RUS)	9.762
3	Andreea Răducan (ROU)	9.737
4	Lisa Skinner (AUS)	9.725
5	Esther Moya (ESP)	9.700
6	Elena Zamolodchikova (RUS)	9.662
7	Yang Yun (CHN)	9.650

Note: In April 2010, the results of Dong Fangxiao from this event were deleted from the records after she was found to be 14 at the time of the Olympics.
