= Gymnastics at the 2000 Summer Olympics – Women's artistic individual all-around =

Women's artistic individual all-around at the Games of the XXVII Olympiad
- Venue: Sydney Superdome
- Date: 21 September 2000
- Competitors: 97 from 43 nations

Medalists
1st place, gold medalist(s)		Simona Amânar	Romania
2nd place, silver medalist(s)		Maria Olaru	Romania
3rd place, bronze medalist(s)		Liu Xuan	China

The women's artistic individual all-around final at the 2000 Summer Olympics was held on 21 September at the Sydney SuperDome. During the all-around competition, gymnasts perform on all four apparatuses – vault, uneven bars, balance beam, and floor exercise. The athletes start on one apparatus, based on their qualification rank, and then rotate until they complete all four. The scores from each apparatus are added together, and the gymnast with the highest total score wins.

The event was impacted by three separate scandals. The vault was set at the incorrect height for the first two rotations of the competition, causing several falls and injuries. The athletes who performed on the incorrectly set vault were allowed to vault again at the end of the competition. Initially, Andreea Răducan won the gold medal for Romania, but she tested positive for pseudoephedrine and was stripped of the medal. The gold and silver medals were reallocated to her Romanian teammates Simona Amânar and Maria Olaru while Liu Xuan received the bronze medal for China. In 2010, it was discovered that China's Dong Fangxiao was competing at these Olympic Games under a falsified birthdate and was too young to compete. In addition to China losing their team bronze medal, Dong's 25th-place finish in the all-around final was nullified.

== Background ==
According to Sal Zanca from The New York Times, Svetlana Khorkina, the 1997 World champion and the reigning European champion was the "overwhelming favorite" to win the Olympic all-around title. Her Russian teammates as well as their rivals, the Romanians, were all seen as contenders for the title. Viktoria Karpenko from Ukraine was also considered a strong contender after finishing second at the 1999 World Championships.

=== Qualification results ===
The qualification round was held on 17 September, and the 36 highest-scoring gymnasts advanced to the final. Each country was limited to three competitors in the final.

Women's all-around qualification results
Rank	Gymnast	Vault (gymnastics)	Uneven bars	Balance beam	Floor (gymnastics)	Total	Qual.
1	Svetlana Khorkina (RUS)	9.731	9.850	9.662	9.762	39.005	Q
2	Andreea Răducan (ROM)	9.743	9.562	9.675	9.737	38.717	Q
3	Simona Amânar (ROM)	9.725	9.550	9.625	9.800	38.700	Q
4	Yekaterina Lobaznyuk (RUS)	9.637	9.675	9.762	9.612	38.686	Q
5	Yelena Produnova (RUS)	9.368	9.762	9.762	9.637	38.529	Q
6	Yang Yun (CHN)	9.299	9.775	9.700	9.650	38.424	Q
7	Elena Zamolodchikova (RUS)	9.612	9.687	9.375	9.662	38.336	–
8	Esther Moya (ESP)	9.768	9.637	9.175	9.700	38.280	Q
DSQ	Dong Fangxiao (CHN)	~~9.581~~	~~9.687~~	~~9.287~~	~~9.675~~	~~38.230~~	DSQ
9	Maria Olaru (ROM)	9.625	9.225	9.787	9.575	38.212	Q
10	Olha Rozshchupkina (UKR)	9.262	9.712	9.625	9.575	38.174	Q
11	Laura Martínez (ESP)	9.649	9.650	9.250	9.612	38.161	Q
12	Elise Ray (USA)	9.468	9.687	9.687	9.225	38.067	Q
13	Amy Chow (USA)	9.468	9.400	9.625	9.525	38.018	Q
14	Yvonne Tousek (CAN)	9.131	9.662	9.537	9.550	37.880	Q
15	Viktoria Karpenko (UKR)	9.250	9.787	9.537	9.300	37.874	Q
16	Loredana Boboc (ROM)	9.250	9.550	9.675	9.337	37.812	–
17	Lisa Skinner (AUS)	9.156	9.687	9.162	9.725	37.730	Q
18	Sara Moro (ESP)	9.243	9.625	9.562	9.275	37.705	Q
19	Kristen Maloney (USA)	9.225	9.575	9.312	9.525	37.637	Q
20	Liu Xuan (CHN)	8.893	9.650	9.712	9.337	39.005	Q
21	Lisa Mason (GBR)	9.231	9.350	9.662	9.337	37.592	Q
22	Alena Polozkova (BLR)	9.106	9.575	9.375	9.500	37.556	Q
23	Delphine Regease (FRA)	9.150	9.212	9.625	9.562	37.549	Q
24	Halina Tyryk (UKR)	8.974	9.650	9.500	9.337	37.461	Q
25	Monica Bergamelli (ITA)	9.449	9.387	9.325	9.300	37.461	Q
26	Annika Reeder (GBR)	9.331	9.437	9.275	9.325	37.368	Q
27	Kate Richardson (CAN)	9.287	9.612	9.075	9.362	37.336	Q
28	Tetiana Yarosh (UKR)	8.818	9.512	9.712	9.275	37.317	–
29	Alexandra Soler (FRA)	9.318	9.475	9.375	9.050	37.218	Q
30	Adriana Crisci (ITA)	8.937	9.500	9.437	9.312	37.186	Q
31	Kana Yamawaki (JPN)	9.356	9.500	9.025	9.300	37.181	Q
32	Jana Komrsková (CZE)	9.500	9.537	9.562	8.525	37.124	Q
33	Daniele Hypólito (BRA)	9.325	9.062	9.462	9.262	37.111	Q
34	Nelly Ramassamy (FRA)	9.212	9.212	9.550	9.050	37.024	Q
35	Martina Bremini (ITA)	9.043	9.550	9.275	9.137	37.005	Q
36	Elvire Teza (FRA)	8.950	9.700	9.550	8.762	36.962	–
37	Emma Williams (GBR)	9.187	9.262	9.237	9.275	36.961	Q
38	Allana Slater (AUS)	8.268	9.675	9.387	9.625	36.955	Q
39	Marina Zarzhitskaya (BLR)	9.431	9.237	9.050	9.050	36.768	Q

== Competition summary and vault height controversy ==
Russia's Svetlana Khorkina performed well on the floor exercise and was the leader after the first rotation, but she fell on the vault during the second rotation. Elise Ray from the United States also fell on her vault and landed on her back. She noted after the competition that the vault looked low to her, but she attributed this feeling to nerves. British gymnast Lisa Mason also believed the vault was too low, but her coach dismissed her concerns. Her teammate Annika Reeder injured her ankle on the vault and withdrew from the rest of the competition, and Brazil's Daniele Hypólito hit her head on the vaulting horse. In total, eight out of 18 gymnasts fell on the vault during the first two rotations.

During the warmups for the third rotation, Australian gymnast Allana Slater thought the vault looked too low after seeing it at the end of the runway. Her concern was only amplified after performing her warmup vault, so she told her coaches, Peggy Liddick and Nikolai Lapchine. Lapchine measured the vaulting horse height by comparing where it normally came up to on his body and told the competition officials that the vault was too low. After the officials brought out a tape measure, their suspicions were confirmed. The vault was set to a height of 120 cm instead of 125 cm. The Olympic staff then raised the vault to the proper height. According to Selena Roberts from The New York Times, this height difference was enough to throw off the gymnast's timing and technique, especially for taller gymnasts like Khorkina and Slater. Khorkina noted after the competition that the height difference was dangerous and potentially deadly.

During the third rotation, Khorkina, who had not heard about the chance to re-do her vault, fell off the uneven bars. A Russian team official noted she was "emotionally depressed" after vault, leading to the mistake on the uneven bars. She ultimately decided against vaulting again. Ray fell off the balance beam during the third rotation and stated that the fall on vault was "a hard thing to bounce back from". She chose to repeat her vault, improving her score from 7.618 to 9.487 and jumping up 21 places in the standings to finish 14th. Overall, only five of the 18 gymnasts who competed on the low vault chose to vault again. Viktoria Karpenko from Ukraine led the competition heading into the last rotation, but she dropped down to 11th after she stumbled on the floor exercise.

Romanian gymnast Andreea Răducan initially won the gold medal while her teammates, Simona Amânar and Maria Olaru, won silver and bronze, respectively. This marked the first time a country swept the women's all-around Olympic podium since the Soviet Union did so in 1960. Additionally, Răducan became Romania's first Olympic all-around champion since Nadia Comăneci won the title in 1976.

== Disqualifications ==
=== Andreea Răducan doping ===
Andreea Răducan, who initially won the event, had her medal stripped five days later after testing positive for pseudoephedrine. Răducan was running a fever and had the common cold, so the team doctor gave her Nurofen, leading to the positive test. She became the first gymnast to ever lose an Olympic medal due to a doping violation. She was allowed to keep her other medals and results because she did not test positive for any banned substances at any time aside from the day of the all-around final. The team doctor who gave the medication was suspended through the 2004 Summer Olympics. According to the president of the Romanian Olympic and Sports Committee, the doctor had also given the same medication to Simona Amânar, but she did not fail the doping test because she weighed more than Răducan. The International Olympic Committee (IOC) acknowledged that Răducan likely did not have a competitive advantage and was not at fault, but they had to apply the rules for failing the drug test. Răducan and the Romanian Olympic Committee appealed the decision to the Court of Arbitration for Sport but were denied.

The gold and silver medals were reallocated to her teammates Amânar and Maria Olaru while China's Liu Xuan received the bronze medal. Amânar and Olaru initially indicated they would refuse the new medals, and Liu expressed her support for Răducan. All three declined a formal medal ceremony. Amânar and Olaru did accept the medals before leaving Sydney. After returning home, Amânar said of the gold medal, "I didn't win it. It was won by Andreea and belongs to Andreea." Răducan met with IOC president Thomas Bach in 2015 to discuss being reinstated as the gold medalist, but Bach upheld the decision, citing a strict-liability standard.

=== Dong Fangxiao age falsification ===
Dong Fangxiao competed with documents stating her birthdate was 20 January 1983, but when she applied to be an official at the 2008 Summer Olympics, she listed her birthdate as 23 January 1986. Her personal CV also listed the 1986 birthdate. This 1986 birthdate meant she was only 14 years old at the 2000 Summer Olympics, which is two years below the International Gymnastics Federation (FIG) minimum age requirement. This prompted an FIG investigation which found that Dong was ineligible to compete in Sydney. Consequently, China lost its bronze medal from the team competition, and all of Dong's results from the Olympics were nullified, including her 25th-place finish in the all-around final. Her teammate Yang Yun, who finished fifth in the all-around final and won bronze on the uneven bars, was also investigated after she admitted on national television that she was only 14 years old at the time of the 2000 Olympic Games, but the FIG did not find enough evidence to nullify her results.

== Final results ==
Women's all-around final results
Rank	Gymnast	Vault (gymnastics)	Uneven bars	Balance beam	Floor (gymnastics)	Total
DSQ	Andreea Răducan (ROU)	~~9.706~~	~~9.575~~	~~9.787~~	~~9.825~~	~~38.893~~
1st place, gold medalist(s)	Simona Amânar (ROU)	9.656	9.512	9.662	9.812	38.642
2nd place, silver medalist(s)	Maria Olaru (ROU)	9.656	9.600	9.700	9.625	38.581
3rd place, bronze medalist(s)	Liu Xuan (CHN)	9.331	9.725	9.750	9.612	38.418
4	Yekaterina Lobaznyuk (RUS)	9.693	9.700	9.425	9.575	38.393
5	Yang Yun (CHN)	9.531	9.787	9.287	9.700	38.305
6	Elena Zamolodchikova (RUS)	9.731	9.725	9.700	9.112	38.268
7	Olga Roschupkina (UKR)	9.368	9.725	9.750	9.362	38.205
8	Lisa Skinner (AUS)	9.168	9.650	9.625	9.750	38.193
9	Esther Moya (ESP)	9.631	9.550	9.187	9.712	38.080
10	Svetlana Khorkina (RUS)	9.343	9.012	9.762	9.812	37.929
11	Viktoria Karpenko (UKR)	9.574	9.800	9.775	8.725	37.874
12	Laura Martinez (ESP)	9.518	9.612	9.062	9.637	37.829
13	Elise Ray (USA)	9.487	9.750	8.887	9.537	37.661
14	Amy Chow (USA)	9.443	9.737	9.225	9.187	37.592
15	Kate Richardson (CAN)	9.281	9.662	9.337	9.250	37.530
16	Allana Slater (AUS)	9.025	9.712	9.112	9.662	37.511
17	Martina Bremini (ITA)	9.325	9.600	9.375	9.187	37.487
18	Monica Bergamelli (ITA)	9.449	9.525	8.975	9.500	37.449
19	Kristen Maloney (USA)	9.543	9.587	8.887	9.412	37.429
20	Daniele Hypólito (BRA)	8.962	9.600	9.325	9.450	37.337
21	Sara Moro (ESP)	9.318	9.637	8.725	9.650	37.330
22	Halina Tyryk (UKR)	9.181	9.650	9.512	8.987	37.330
23	Lisa Mason (GBR)	9.356	9.262	9.537	9.012	37.167
24	Delphine Regease (FRA)	9.087	9.225	9.575	9.162	37.049
DSQ	Dong Fangxiao (CHN)	~~9.293~~	~~9.025~~	~~9.275~~	~~9.300~~	~~36.893~~
25	Adriana Crisci (ITA)	9.187	9.062	8.962	9.675	36.886
26	Marina Zarzhitskaya (BLR)	9.387	9.637	9.150	8.700	36.874
27	Kana Yamawaki (JPN)	9.293	9.012	9.025	9.312	36.642
28	Jana Komrsková (CZE)	9.506	9.487	8.675	8.950	36.618
29	Nelly Ramassamy (FRA)	9.243	9.137	9.112	9.100	36.592
30	Alexandra Soler (FRA)	9.299	9.487	8.350	9.362	36.498
31	Emma Williams (GBR)	9.143	9.125	9.050	9.125	36.443
32	Yvonne Tousek (CAN)	9.081	9.150	9.225	8.825	36.281
33	Alena Polozkova (BLR)	9.100	8.225	9.275	9.562	36.162
34	Annika Reeder (GBR)	7.274	-	-	9.262	DNF

== Aftermath ==
Three days after the competition, the FIG issued an apology statement for the vault error and said they would add new specification checks for the equipment. The FIG also stated that the officials responsible were reprimanded but did not reveal the details. The Sydney 2000 Olympic organizers also issued an apology. It was later discovered that there was an error in the paperwork that laid out the proper dimensions for the apparatus. In 2001, the FIG introduced the redesigned vault which changed the vaulting horse to a vaulting table, giving gymnasts a wider surface area to put their hands on and reducing the risk of serious injuries. In 2021, the Blind Landing podcast released its first season, which covered the events of the all-around final. The podcast featured interviews from Ray, Khorkina, Slater, Olaru, and Mason.
