= 1998 European Women's Artistic Gymnastics Championships =

22nd European Women's Artistic Gymnastics Championships
- Location: Saint Petersburg, Russia
- Dates: 30 April – 3 May 1998

The 22nd European Women's Artistic Gymnastics Championships were held from 30 April to 3 May 1998 in Saint Petersburg, Russia.

== Medalists ==
Event	Gold	Silver	Bronze
Seniors
Team	Romania; Simona Amânar; Claudia Presăcan; Maria Olaru; Corina Ungureanu; Alexandra Dobrescu	Russia; Svetlana Khorkina; Yevgeniya Kuznetsova; Ludmila Ezhova; Elena Zamolodchikova; Elena Dolgopolova	Ukraine; Olha Teslenko; Viktoria Karpenko; Inha Shkarupa; Halina Tyryk; Natalia Sirenko
All-around	Svetlana Khorkina (RUS)	Simona Amânar (ROU)	Claudia Presăcan (ROU)
Vault	Adrienn Varga (HUN)	Maria Olaru (ROU); Simona Amânar (ROU)	none awarded
Uneven bars	Svetlana Khorkina (RUS)	Viktoria Karpenko (UKR)	Claudia Presăcan (ROU)
Balance beam	Yevgeniya Kuznetsova (RUS)	Olga Teslenko (UKR)	Ludmila Ezhova (RUS); Simona Amânar (ROU)
Floor	Svetlana Khorkina (RUS); Corina Ungureanu (ROU)	none awarded	Simona Amânar (ROU)
Juniors
Team	Ukraine; Olga Roschupkina; Elena Ryzhkova; Natalia Sirobaba; Nataliya Horodniy; Tatiana Yarosh	Romania; Andreea Isărescu; Andreea Răducan; Olimpia Popa; Elena Oprea; Daniela Trandafir	Italy; Monica Bergamelli; Irene Castelli; Elena Olivetti; Federica Spadone; Lucia Valetta
All-Around	Anna Kovalyova (RUS)	Andreea Isărescu (ROU); Olga Roschupkina (UKR)	none awarded
Vault	Anna Kovalyova (RUS)	Andreea Isărescu (ROU)	Esther Moya (ESP)
Uneven Bars	Tatiana Yarosh (UKR)	Andreea Răducan (ROU)	Elena Olivetti (ITA)
Balance Beam	Olga Roschupkina (UKR)	Monica Bergamelli (ITA)	Anna Kovalyova (RUS)
Floor	Tatiana Yarosh (UKR); Andreea Isărescu (ROU)	none awarded	Anna Kovalyova (RUS); Andreea Răducan (ROU)

=== Medal table ===
==== Combined ====
Rank	Nation	Gold	Silver	Bronze	Total
1	Russia (RUS)	6	1	3	10
2	Ukraine (UKR)	4	3	1	8
3	Romania (ROU)	3	7	5	15
4	Hungary (HUN)	1	0	0	1
5	Italy (ITA)	0	1	2	3
6	Spain (ESP)	0	0	1	1
Totals (6 entries)		14	12	12	38

==== Seniors ====
Rank	Nation	Gold	Silver	Bronze	Total
1	Russia (RUS)	4	1	1	6
2	Romania (ROU)	2	3	4	9
3	Hungary (HUN)	1	0	0	1
4	Ukraine (UKR)	0	2	1	3
Totals (4 entries)		7	6	6	19

==== Juniors ====
Rank	Nation	Gold	Silver	Bronze	Total
1	Ukraine (UKR)	4	1	0	5
2	Russia (RUS)	2	0	2	4
3	Romania (ROU)	1	4	1	6
4	Italy (ITA)	0	1	2	3
5	Spain (ESP)	0	0	1	1
Totals (5 entries)		7	6	6	19

== Seniors ==
=== Team ===
Rank	Team	Vault (gymnastics)	Uneven bars	Balance beam	Floor (gymnastics)	Total
1st place, gold medalist(s)	Romania	28.817	29.012	28.836	29.274	115.939
1st place, gold medalist(s)	Simona Amânar	9.699	9.625	9.737	9.762	115.939
1st place, gold medalist(s)	Claudia Presăcan	9.475	9.700	9.387	9.750	115.939
1st place, gold medalist(s)	Maria Olaru	9.643				115.939
1st place, gold medalist(s)	Corina Ungureanu		9.687	9.712	9.762	115.939
1st place, gold medalist(s)	Alexandra Dobrescu					115.939
2nd place, silver medalist(s)	Russia	27.898	28.899	28.474	27.449	112.720
2nd place, silver medalist(s)	Svetlana Khorkina	9.562	9.862	9.075	9.575	112.720
2nd place, silver medalist(s)	Yevgeniya Kuznetsova		9.787	9.712		112.720
2nd place, silver medalist(s)	Elena Dolgopolova	8.643			9.187	112.720
2nd place, silver medalist(s)	Elena Zamolodchikova	9.693			8.687	112.720
2nd place, silver medalist(s)	Ludmila Ezhova		9.250	9.687		112.720
3rd place, bronze medalist(s)	Ukraine	27.573	28.549	28.499	28.011	112.632
3rd place, bronze medalist(s)	Viktoria Karpenko	9.268	9.612	9.287	9.287	112.632
3rd place, bronze medalist(s)	Olha Teslenko	9.018	9.700	9.662	9.212	112.632
3rd place, bronze medalist(s)	Inha Shkarupa	9.287	9.237		9.512	112.632
3rd place, bronze medalist(s)	Halina Tyryk			9.550		112.632
3rd place, bronze medalist(s)	Natalia Sirenko					112.632
4	France	26.968	27.811	28.561	28.937	112.277
4	Elvire Teza	8.950	9.712	9.612	9.475	112.277
4	Isabelle Severino	9.087	8.862	9.462	9.737	112.277
4	Ludivine Furnon			9.487	9.725	112.277
4	Cécile Canqueteau		9.237			112.277
4	Magalie Ruffato	8.931				112.277
5	Spain	27.586	28.636	26.311	28.249	110.782
5	Jennifer Montávez	9.237	9.412	9.412	9.362	110.782
5	Susana García	9.212	9.537	8.737	9.437	110.782
5	Rebeca Toledano		9.687		9.450	110.782
5	Beatriz Sánchez	9.137		8.162		110.782
5	Diana Plaza					110.782
6	Italy	27.767	28.362	27.524	27.112	110.765
6	Martina Bremini	9.368	9.512	9.512	9.400	110.765
6	Adriana Crisci	9.262	9.475	9.512	9.100	110.765
6	Laura Montagnolo	9.137			8.612	110.765
6	Ilenia Santoni			8.500		110.765
6	Francesca Morotti		9.375			110.765
7	Hungary	27.754	27.862	27.212	27.286	110.214
7	Adrienn Varga	9.562	9.375	9.125	9.012	110.214
7	Gabriella Ónodi	9.068	9.200	8.750	9.512	110.214
7	Zjanett Szikora			9.337	8.862	110.214
7	Adrienn Nyeste		9.287			110.214
7	Ildikó Pasztor	9.124				110.214
8	Belarus	27.424	27.699	26.824	27.800	109.747
8	Alena Polozkova	9.331	9.187	9.287	9.525	109.747
8	Elena Savko	9.162	9.437	8.825	9.150	109.747
8	Julia Sobko	8.931		8.712	9.125	109.747
8	Tatiana Zharganova		9.075			109.747
8	Svetlana Tarasevich					109.747

=== All-around ===
Rank	Gymnast	Vault (gymnastics)	Uneven bars	Balance beam	Floor (gymnastics)	Total
1st place, gold medalist(s)	Svetlana Khorkina (RUS)	9.275	9.887	9.787	9.675	38.624
2nd place, silver medalist(s)	Simona Amânar (ROU)	9.543	9.562	9.512	9.775	38.392
3rd place, bronze medalist(s)	Claudia Presăcan (ROU)	9.356	9.662	9.637	9.612	38.267
4	Viktoria Karpenko (UKR)	9.100	9.725	9.337	9.612	37.774
5	Martina Bremini (ITA)	9.206	9.525	9.437	9.375	37.543
6	Olha Teslenko (UKR)	8.918	9.787	9.700	8.912	37.317
7	Elvire Teza (FRA)	8.874	9.712	9.675	8.962	37.223
8	Jennifer Montávez (ESP)	9.162	9.412	9.387	9.200	37.161
8	Adriana Crisci (ITA)	9.249	9.375	9.462	9.075	37.161
10	Isabelle Severino (FRA)	9.318	8.875	9.525	9.437	37.155
11	Susana García (ESP)	9.162	9.137	9.587	9.237	37.123
12	Gabriella Ónodi (HUN)	9.006	9.250	9.200	9.387	36.843
13	Alena Polozkova (BLR)	9.025	9.500	9.025	9.275	36.825
14	Gritt Hofmann (GER)	8.968	9.000	9.325	9.287	36.580
15	Yvonne Pioch (GER)	9.068	8.675	9.262	8.837	35.842
16	Annika Reeder (GBR)	9.225	9.237	8.400	8.937	35.799
17	Mojca Mavrič (SLO)	8.900	8.575	9.337	8.975	35.787
18	Marny Østreng (NOR)	9.093	8.800	8.837	8.925	35.655
19	Silvie Hejlíková (CZE)	8.975	8.462	9.362	8.825	35.624
20	Lisa Mason (GBR)	7.649	9.225	9.475	9.175	35.524
21	Fieke Willems (NED)	8.862	9.037	8.650	8.650	35.199
22	Joanna Skowrońska (POL)	8.924	9.012	7.375	9.325	34.636
23	Elena Savko (BLR)	8.906	8.112	8.737	8.737	34.492

=== Vault ===
Rank	Gymnast	Total
1st place, gold medalist(s)	Adrienn Varga (HUN)	9.643
2nd place, silver medalist(s)	Maria Olaru (ROU)	9.543
2nd place, silver medalist(s)	Simona Amânar (ROU)	9.543
4	Elena Zamolodchikova (RUS)	9.424
5	Annika Reeder (GBR)	9.262
6	Martina Bremini (ITA)	9.125
7	Sofia Karyoti (GRE)	9.112
8	Alena Polozkova (BLR)	8.568

=== Uneven bars ===
Rank	Gymnast	Total
1st place, gold medalist(s)	Svetlana Khorkina (RUS)	9.900
2nd place, silver medalist(s)	Viktoria Karpenko (UKR)	9.787
3rd place, bronze medalist(s)	Claudia Presăcan (ROU)	9.762
4	Corina Ungureanu (ROU)	9.750
5	Olha Teslenko (UKR)	9.687
6	Rebeca Toledano (ESP)	9.650
7	Yevgeniya Kuznetsova (RUS)	9.512
8	Elvire Teza (FRA)	8.600

=== Balance beam ===
Rank	Gymnast	Total
1st place, gold medalist(s)	Yevgeniya Kuznetsova (RUS)	9.775
2nd place, silver medalist(s)	Olha Teslenko (UKR)	9.687
3rd place, bronze medalist(s)	Ludmila Ezhova (RUS)	9.662
3rd place, bronze medalist(s)	Simona Amânar (ROU)	9.662
5	Halina Tyryk (UKR)	9.612
6	Martina Bremini (ITA)	9.550
7	Adriana Crisci (ITA)	9.162
8	Corina Ungureanu (ROU)	9.062

=== Floor exercise ===
Rank	Gymnast	Total
1st place, gold medalist(s)	Svetlana Khorkina (RUS)	9.787
1st place, gold medalist(s)	Corina Ungureanu (ROU)	9.787
3rd place, bronze medalist(s)	Simona Amânar (ROU)	9.725
4	Lisa Mason (GBR)	9.675
5	Ludivine Furnon (FRA)	9.650
6	Gabriella Ónodi (HUN)	9.575
6	Isabelle Severino (FRA)	9.575
8	Inha Shkarupa (UKR)	9.512

== Juniors ==
=== Team ===
Rank	Team	Vault (gymnastics)	Uneven bars	Balance beam	Floor (gymnastics)	Total
1st place, gold medalist(s)	Ukraine	27.656	29.137	28.687	28.537	114.017
2nd place, silver medalist(s)	Romania	27.318	28.062	28.512	27.162	111.054
3rd place, bronze medalist(s)	Italy	27.273	28.299	27.699	27.625	110.896
4	Russia	27.367	28.362	25.611	28.411	109.751
5	Spain	27.580	26.762	27.012	27.362	108.716
6	France	27.018	26.674	26.887	27.374	107.953
7	Germany	26.924	26.887	26.362	27.224	107.397
8	Great Britain	27.042	26.187	26.762	27.374	107.365

=== All-around ===
Rank	Gymnast	Vault (gymnastics)	Uneven bars	Balance beam	Floor (gymnastics)	Total
1st place, gold medalist(s)	Anna Kovalyova (RUS)	9.581	9.550	9.712	9.787	38.630
2nd place, silver medalist(s)	Andreea Isărescu (ROU)	9.237	9.600	9.612	9.762	38.211
2nd place, silver medalist(s)	Olga Roschupkina (UKR)	9.250	9.687	9.637	9.637	38.211
4	Andreea Răducan (ROU)	9.043	9.037	9.625	9.762	37.467
5	Esther Moya (ESP)	9.368	9.150	9.387	9.475	37.380
6	Jana Komrsková (CZE)	8.912	9.575	9.525	9.350	37.362
7	Monica Bergamelli (ITA)	8.843	9.500	9.262	9.400	37.005
8	Elena Olivetti (ITA)	9.106	8.887	9.512	9.237	36.742
9	Melissa Wilcox (GBR)	9.037	9.287	9.350	9.050	36.724
10	Nelly Ramassamy (FRA)	8.818	9.325	9.200	9.100	36.443
11	Zuzana Sekerová (SVK)	9.018	9.562	9.100	8.600	36.280
12	Patricia Suárez (ESP)	9.143	9.200	8.787	9.037	36.167
13	Katja Abel (GER)	9.050	8.987	8.987	9.000	36.024
14	Lisa Brüggemann (GER)	8.962	9.125	9.025	8.887	35.999
15	Monique Nuijten (NED)	9.187	8.775	8.825	9.187	35.974
16	Anastasia Kolesnikova (RUS)	8.743	9.400	8.812	8.900	35.855
17	Olga Menin (ISR)	8.799	9.175	9.362	8.250	35.586
18	Sigrid Persoon (BEL)	9.174	8.525	9.162	8.525	35.386
19	Holly Murdock (GBR)	9.056	8.312	8.962	8.850	35.180
20	Zeinab Kheireddine (HUN)	8.700	8.400	8.550	8.950	34.600
21	Alexandra Soler (FRA)	9.000	7.487	9.325	8.775	34.587
22	Emese Szabó (HUN)	8.837	8.600	7.975	8.900	34.312
23	Hadas Cohen (ISR)	8.999	8.525	7.975	8.587	34.086
24	Marleen Deuning (NED)	8.674	8.987	6.700	9.262	33.623

=== Vault ===
Rank	Gymnast	Total
1st place, gold medalist(s)	Anna Kovalyova (RUS)	9.524
2nd place, silver medalist(s)	Andreea Isărescu (ROU)	9.349
3rd place, bronze medalist(s)	Esther Moya (ESP)	9.293
4	Olga Roschupkina (UKR)	9.018
5	Monica Bergamelli (ITA)	9.012
6	Angelique Soulie (FRA)	8.850
7	Patricia Suárez (ESP)	8.818
8	Natalia Sirobaba (UKR)	8.581

=== Uneven bars ===
Rank	Gymnast	Total
1st place, gold medalist(s)	Olga Roschupkina (UKR)	9.700
2nd place, silver medalist(s)	Monica Bergamelli (ITA)	9.587
3rd place, bronze medalist(s)	Anna Kovalyova (RUS)	9.500
4	Elena Olivetti (ITA)	9.450
5	Andreea Isărescu (ROU)	9.400
6	Elena Ryzhkova (UKR)	8.975
7	Simona Rawská (SVK)	8.700
8	Anastasia Kolesnikova (RUS)	7.612

=== Balance beam ===
Rank	Gymnast	Total
1st place, gold medalist(s)	Tatiana Yarosh (UKR)	9.662
2nd place, silver medalist(s)	Andreea Răducan (ROU)	9.650
3rd place, bronze medalist(s)	Elena Olivetti (ITA)	9.587
4	Olga Roschupkina (UKR)	9.550
5	Holly Murdock (GBR)	9.525
6	Esther Moya (ESP)	9.512
7	Alexandra Soler (FRA)	9.175
8	Andreea Isărescu (ROU)	9.075
9	Irene Castelli (ITA)	8.825

=== Floor exercise ===
Rank	Gymnast	Total
1st place, gold medalist(s)	Andreea Isărescu (ROU)	9.737
1st place, gold medalist(s)	Tatiana Yarosh (UKR)	9.737
3rd place, bronze medalist(s)	Anna Kovalyova (RUS)	9.712
3rd place, bronze medalist(s)	Andreea Răducan (ROU)	9.712
5	Olga Roschupkina (UKR)	9.700
6	Nelly Ramassamy (FRA)	9.512
6	Melissa Wilcox (GBR)	9.512
8	Anastasia Kolesnikova (RUS)	8.750
