= Romania at the World Artistic Gymnastics Championships =

- Flag of Romania
- IOC code: ROU
- Medals: Gold 48 Silver 45 Bronze 42 Total 135

Romania first participated at the 1954 World Championships where their women's team placed fourth. At the 1958 World Championships Romania won their first medal, a bronze, in the women's team final.

== Medalists ==
Medal	Name	Year	Event
Bronze	Elena Mărgărit, Atanasia Ionescu, Sonia Iovan, Emilia Vătășoiu, Elena Săcălici, Elena Leuşteanu	(Soviet Union) 1958 Moscow	Women's team
Gold	Dan Grecu	(Bulgaria) 1974 Varna	Men's rings
Silver	Nadia Comăneci, Emilia Eberle, Marilena Neacsu, Teodora Ungureanu, Anca Grigoraș, Marilena Vlădărău	(France) 1978 Strasbourg	Women's team
Silver	Nadia Comăneci	(France) 1978 Strasbourg	Women's vault
Bronze	Emilia Eberle	(France) 1978 Strasbourg	Women's uneven bars
Bronze	Dan Grecu	(France) 1978 Strasbourg	Men's rings
Gold	Nadia Comăneci	(France) 1978 Strasbourg	Women's balance beam
Bronze	Emilia Eberle	(France) 1978 Strasbourg	Women's balance beam
Bronze	Emilia Eberle	(France) 1978 Strasbourg	Women's floor exercise
Gold	Nadia Comăneci, Rodica Dunca, Emilia Eberle, Melita Ruhn, Dumitriţa Turner, Marilena Vladarau	(United States) 1979 Fort Worth	Women's team
Bronze	Melita Ruhn	(United States) 1979 Fort Worth	Women's all-around
Gold	Dumitriţa Turner	(United States) 1979 Fort Worth	Women's vault
Bronze	Emilia Eberle	(United States) 1979 Fort Worth	Women's uneven bars
Silver	Dan Grecu	(United States) 1979 Fort Worth	Men's rings
Gold	Emilia Eberle	(United States) 1979 Fort Worth	Women's floor exercise
Bronze	Melita Ruhn	(United States) 1979 Fort Worth	Women's floor exercise
Silver	Lavinia Agache, Mirela Barbălată, Laura Cutina, Simona Renciu, Mihaela Stănuleţ, Ecaterina Szabo	(Hungary) 1983 Budapest	Women's team
Bronze	Ecaterina Szabo	(Hungary) 1983 Budapest	Women's all-around
Silver	Lavinia Agache	(Hungary) 1983 Budapest	Women's vault
Silver	Ecaterina Szabo	(Hungary) 1983 Budapest	Women's vault
Silver	Lavinia Agache	(Hungary) 1983 Budapest	Women's uneven bars
Silver	Ecaterina Szabo	(Hungary) 1983 Budapest	Women's uneven bars
Bronze	Lavinia Agache	(Hungary) 1983 Budapest	Women's balance beam
Gold	Ecaterina Szabo	(Hungary) 1983 Budapest	Women's floor exercise
Silver	Laura Cutina, Eugenia Golea, Celestina Popa, Daniela Silivaș, Ecaterina Szabo, Camelia Voinea	(Canada) 1985 Montreal	Women's team
Silver	Ecaterina Szabo	(Canada) 1985 Montreal	Women's vault
Gold	Daniela Silivaș	(Canada) 1985 Montreal	Women's balance beam
Silver	Ecaterina Szabo	(Canada) 1985 Montreal	Women's balance beam
Gold	Aurelia Dobre, Daniela Silivaș, Ecaterina Szabo, Camelia Voinea, Eugenia Golea, Celestina Popa	(Netherlands) 1987 Rotterdam	Women's team
Gold	Aurelia Dobre	(Netherlands) 1987 Rotterdam	Women's all-around
Bronze	Daniela Silivaș	(Netherlands) 1987 Rotterdam	Women's all-around
Silver	Eugenia Golea	(Netherlands) 1987 Rotterdam	Women's vault
Bronze	Aurelia Dobre	(Netherlands) 1987 Rotterdam	Women's vault
Gold	Daniela Silivaș	(Netherlands) 1987 Rotterdam	Women's uneven bars
Gold	Aurelia Dobre	(Netherlands) 1987 Rotterdam	Women's balance beam
Bronze	Ecaterina Szabo	(Netherlands) 1987 Rotterdam	Women's balance beam
Gold	Daniela Silivaș	(Netherlands) 1987 Rotterdam	Women's floor exercise
Bronze	Aurelia Dobre	(Netherlands) 1987 Rotterdam	Women's floor exercise
Silver	Daniela Silivaș, Gabriela Potorac, Cristina Bontaș, Eugenia Popa, Lăcrămioara Filip, Aurelia Dobre	(West Germany) 1989 Stuttgart	Women's team
Silver	Cristina Bontaș	(West Germany) 1989 Stuttgart	Women's vault
Gold	Daniela Silivaș	(West Germany) 1989 Stuttgart	Women's uneven bars
Gold	Daniela Silivaș	(West Germany) 1989 Stuttgart	Women's balance beam
Bronze	Gabriela Potorac	(West Germany) 1989 Stuttgart	Women's balance beam
Gold	Daniela Silivaș	(West Germany) 1989 Stuttgart	Women's floor exercise
Bronze	Cristina Bontaș	(West Germany) 1989 Stuttgart	Women's floor exercise
Bronze	Cristina Bontaş, Mirela Pasca, Lavinia Miloșovici, Vanda Hadarean, Maria Neculita, Eugenia Popa	(United States) 1991 Indianapolis	Women's team
Bronze	Cristina Bontaş	(United States) 1991 Indianapolis	Women's all-around
Gold	Lavinia Miloșovici	(United States) 1991 Indianapolis	Women's vault
Bronze	Lavinia Miloșovici	(United States) 1991 Indianapolis	Women's balance beam
Gold	Cristina Bontaş	(United States) 1991 Indianapolis	Women's floor exercise
Gold	Lavinia Miloșovici	(France) 1992 Paris	Women's uneven bars
Bronze	Mirela Pașca	(France) 1992 Paris	Women's uneven bars
Silver	Maria Neculiță	(France) 1992 Paris	Women's balance beam
Bronze	Maria Neculiță	(France) 1992 Paris	Women's floor exercise
Silver	Gina Gogean	(United Kingdom) 1993 Birmingham	Women's all-around
Silver	Lavinia Miloșovici	(United Kingdom) 1993 Birmingham	Women's vault
Bronze	Andreea Cacovean	(United Kingdom) 1993 Birmingham	Women's uneven bars
Gold	Lavinia Miloșovici	(United Kingdom) 1993 Birmingham	Women's balance beam
Bronze	Gina Gogean	(United Kingdom) 1993 Birmingham	Women's balance beam
Silver	Gina Gogean	(United Kingdom) 1993 Birmingham	Women's floor exercise
Silver	Marius Gherman	(United Kingdom) 1993 Birmingham	Men's horizontal bar
Silver	Lavinia Miloșovici	(Australia) 1994 Brisbane	Women's all-around
Gold	Gina Gogean	(Australia) 1994 Brisbane	Women's vault
Bronze	Lavinia Miloșovici	(Australia) 1994 Brisbane	Women's vault
Gold	Marius Urzică	(Australia) 1994 Brisbane	Men's pommel horse
Bronze	Dan Burincă	(Australia) 1994 Brisbane	Men's rings
Silver	Lavinia Miloșovici	(Australia) 1994 Brisbane	Women's floor exercise
Bronze	Gina Gogean	(Australia) 1994 Brisbane	Women's floor exercise
Gold	Simona Amânar, Gina Gogean, Nadia Hațegan, Ionela Loaieș, Daniela Mărănducă, Lavinia Miloșovici, Claudia Presăcan	(Germany) Dortmund	Women's team
Bronze	Dan Burincă, Adrian Ianculescu, Cristian Leric, Nistor Șandro, Nicu Stroia, Marius Urzică, Nicolae Bejenaru	(Japan) 1995 Sabae	Men's team
Gold	Lavinia Miloșovici, Gina Gogean, Simona Amânar, Alexandra Marinescu, Andreea Cacovean, Claudia Presăcan, Nadia Hațegan	(Japan) 1995 Sabae	Women's team
Bronze	Lavinia Miloșovici	(Japan) 1995 Sabae	Women's all-around
Gold	Simona Amânar	(Japan) 1995 Sabae	Women's vault
Bronze	Gina Gogean	(Japan) 1995 Sabae	Women's vault
Silver	Dan Burincă	(Japan) 1995 Sabae	Men's rings
Gold	Gina Gogean	(Japan) 1995 Sabae	Women's floor exercise
Gold	Gina Gogean	(Puerto Rico) 1996 San Juan	Women's vault
Silver	Simona Amânar	(Puerto Rico) 1996 San Juan	Women's vault
Silver	Alexandra Marinescu	(Puerto Rico) 1996 San Juan	Women's balance beam
Gold	Gina Gogean	(Puerto Rico) 1996 San Juan	Women's floor exercise
Bronze	Lavinia Miloșovici	(Puerto Rico) 1996 San Juan	Women's floor exercise
Gold	Simona Amânar, Claudia Presăcan, Gina Gogean, Alexandra Marinescu, Corina Ungureanu, Mirela Tugurlan	(Switzerland) 1997 Lausanne	Women's team
Silver	Simona Amânar	(Switzerland) 1997 Lausanne	Women's all-around
Gold	Simona Amânar	(Switzerland) 1997 Lausanne	Women's vault
Bronze	Gina Gogean	(Switzerland) 1997 Lausanne	Women's vault
Bronze	Adrian Ianculescu	(Switzerland) 1997 Lausanne	Men's vault
Gold	Gina Gogean	(Switzerland) 1997 Lausanne	Women's balance beam
Gold	Gina Gogean	(Switzerland) 1997 Lausanne	Women's floor exercise
Gold	Maria Olaru, Andreea Răducan, Simona Amânar, Andreea Isărescu, Corina Ungureanu, Loredana Boboc	(China) 1999 Tianjin	Women's team
Gold	Maria Olaru	(China) 1999 Tianjin	Women's all-around
Silver	Simona Amânar	(China) 1999 Tianjin	Women's vault
Bronze	Maria Olaru	(China) 1999 Tianjin	Women's vault
Silver	Marius Urzică	(China) 1999 Tianjin	Men's pommel horse
Silver	Andreea Răducan	(China) 1999 Tianjin	Women's balance beam
Gold	Andreea Răducan	(China) 1999 Tianjin	Women's floor exercise
Silver	Simona Amânar	(China) 1999 Tianjin	Women's floor exercise
Gold	Andreea Răducan, Sabina Cojocar, Andreea Ulmeanu, Silvia Stroescu, Carmen Ionescu, Loredana Boboc	(Belgium) 2001 Ghent	Women's team
Bronze	Andreea Răducan	(Belgium) 2001 Ghent	Women's all-around
Gold	Marian Drăgulescu	(Belgium) 2001 Ghent	Men's floor exercise
Bronze	Andreea Răducan	(Belgium) 2001 Ghent	Women's vault
Gold	Marius Urzică	(Belgium) 2001 Ghent	Men's pommel horse
Gold	Marian Drăgulescu	(Belgium) 2001 Ghent	Men's vault
Gold	Andreea Răducan	(Belgium) 2001 Ghent	Women's balance beam
Gold	Andreea Răducan	(Belgium) 2001 Ghent	Women's floor exercise
Gold	Marian Drăgulescu	(Hungary) 2002 Debrecen	Men's floor exercise
Gold	Marius Urzică	(Hungary) 2002 Debrecen	Men's pommel horse
Silver	Oana Petrovschi	(Hungary) 2002 Debrecen	Women's uneven bars
Silver	Oana Ban	(Hungary) 2002 Debrecen	Women's balance beam
Silver	Cătălina Ponor, Oana Ban, Alexandra Eremia, Andreea Munteanu, Monica Roșu, Florica Leonida	(United States) 2003 Anaheim	Women's team
Silver	Marian Drăgulescu	(United States) 2003 Anaheim	Men's vault
Silver	Cătălina Ponor	(United States) 2003 Anaheim	Women's balance beam
Silver	Cătălina Ponor	(United States) 2003 Anaheim	Women's floor exercise
Silver	Ioan Silviu Suciu	(Australia) 2005 Melbourne	Men's pommel horse
Gold	Marian Drăgulescu	(Australia) 2005 Melbourne	Men's vault
Bronze	Alin Jivan	(Australia) 2005 Melbourne	Men's vault
Bronze	Cătălina Ponor	(Australia) 2005 Melbourne	Women's balance beam
Bronze	Sandra Izbașa	(Denmark) 2006 Aarhus	Women's all-around
Gold	Marian Drăgulescu	(Denmark) 2006 Aarhus	Men's floor exercise
Gold	Marian Drăgulescu	(Denmark) 2006 Aarhus	Men's vault
Silver	Sandra Izbașa	(Denmark) 2006 Aarhus	Women's balance beam
Bronze	Steliana Nistor, Sandra Izbașa, Cătălina Ponor, Daniela Druncea, Cerasela Pătrașcu, Andreea Grigore	(Germany) 2007 Stuttgart	Women's team
Silver	Steliana Nistor	(Germany) 2007 Stuttgart	Women's all-around
Silver	Ilie Daniel Popescu	(Germany) 2007 Stuttgart	Men's vault
Silver	Steliana Nistor	(Germany) 2007 Stuttgart	Women's balance beam
Gold	Marian Drăgulescu	(United Kingdom) 2009 London	Men's floor exercise
Bronze	Ana Porgras	(United Kingdom) 2009 London	Women's uneven bars
Gold	Marian Drăgulescu	(United Kingdom) 2009 London	Men's vault
Silver	Flavius Koczi	(United Kingdom) 2009 London	Men's vault
Gold	Ana Porgras	(Netherlands) 2010 Rotterdam	Women's balance beam
Silver	Diana Chelaru	(Netherlands) 2010 Rotterdam	Women's floor exercise
Bronze	Larisa Iordache	(Belgium) 2013 Antwerp	Women's floor exercise
Silver	Larisa Iordache	(China) 2014 Nanning	Women's all-around
Silver	Larisa Iordache	(China) 2014 Nanning	Women's floor exercise
Bronze	Larisa Iordache	(United Kingdom) 2015 Glasgow	Women's all-around
Silver	Marian Drăgulescu	(United Kingdom) 2015 Glasgow	Men's vault

== Medal tables ==
=== By gender ===
Gender	Gold	Silver	Bronze	Total
Women	36	36	37	109
Men	12	9	5	26

=== By event ===
Event	Gold	Silver	Bronze	Total
Women's floor exercise	10	6	8	24
Women's balance beam	8	8	7	23
Women's team	7	5	3	15
Women's vault	6	9	6	21
Men's vault	4	4	2	10
Men's floor exercise	4	0	0	4
Women's uneven bars	3	3	5	11
Men's pommel horse	3	2	0	5
Women's individual all-around	2	5	8	15
Men's rings	1	2	2	5
Men's horizontal bar	0	1	0	1
Men's team	0	0	1	1
Men's individual all-around	0	0	0	0
Men's parallel bars	0	0	0	0

== Junior World medalists ==
Medal	Name	Year	Event
Gold	Gabriel Burtănete	(Hungary) 2019 Győr	Boys' vault
Silver	Gabriela Vănoagă	(Turkey) 2023 Antalya	Girls' balance beam
Bronze	Alexia Blanaru	(Philippines) 2025 Manila	Girls' vault
