= Evgeniya Kuznetsova =

Olympic artistic gymnast (born 1980)

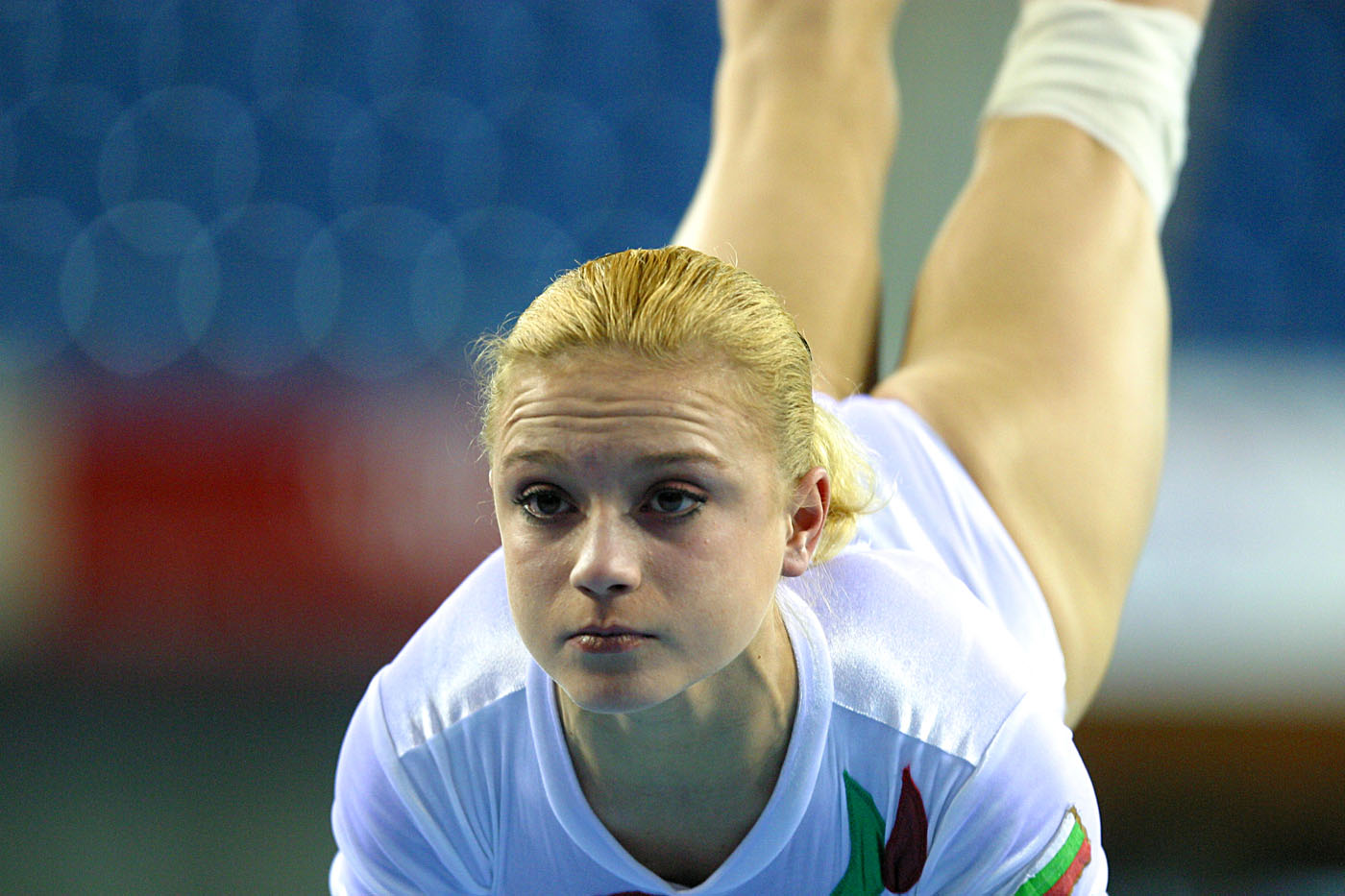
- Kuznetsova at World Artistic Gymnastics Championships (for Bulgaria) in Debrecen (HU) 22/11/2002

Personal information
- Full name: Evgeniya Petrovna Kuznetsova
- Nickname: Zhena
- Born: 18 December 1980 (age 45) Leningrad, Russian SFSR, Soviet Union (now St. Petersburg, Russia)
- Height: 1.43 m (4 ft 8 in)

Gymnastics career
- Discipline: Women's artistic gymnastics
- Country represented: Bulgaria
- Former countries represented: Russia
- Club: Dynamo St. Petersburg, Levski Sofia
- Head coach: Gheorge Videnov
- Former coaches: Alexander and Vera Kiriaschov
Medal record
Representing Russia
Artistic Gymnastics
Olympic Games
Silver medal – second place	1996 Atlanta	Team
World Championships
Silver medal – second place	1997 Lausanne	Team
Silver medal – second place	1999 Tianjin	Team
European Championships
Gold medal – first place	1998 St.Petersburg	Balance Beam
Gold medal – first place	2000 Paris	Team
Silver medal – second place	1998 St.Petersburg	Team

Evgeniya Petrovna Kuznetsova (Russian: Евгения Петровна Кузнецова) (born 18 December 1980 in Leningrad) is a former Olympic gymnast who competed for Russia in the 1996 Olympic Games. She won the silver medal in the team competition. She also competed for Bulgaria in the 2004 Olympic Games after switching allegiance due to differences with the Russian Federation.

== Competitive history ==
Year	Event	Team	AA	VT	UB	BB	FX
1995	World Championships	4th					
1996	Olympic Games	2nd					
1997	World Championships	2nd	16th		8th		
1998	European Championships	2nd			7th	1st	
1999	World Championships	2nd					
2000	European Championships	1st					
2001	World Championships		15th				
2002	European Championships	7th	8th				
2002	World Championships					5th	
2003	World Championships						
2004	Olympic Games						

- Competitor for Bulgaria

Year	Competition Description	Location	Apparatus	Rank-Final	Score-Final	Rank-Qualifying	Score-Qualifying
2004	Olympic Games	Athens	Uneven Bars			81	8.150
2004	Olympic Games	Athens	Balance Beam			46	8.887
2003	World Championships	Anaheim	Team			19	137.458
2003	World Championships	Anaheim	All-Around			34	35.361
2003	World Championships	Anaheim	Uneven Bars			44	8.962
2003	World Championships	Anaheim	Balance Beam			50	8.712
2003	World Championships	Anaheim	Floor Exercise			66	8.612
2002	World Championships	Debrecen	Uneven Bars (Qualification)			24	8.425
2002	World Championships	Debrecen	Balance Beam	5	9.075		
2002	World Championships	Debrecen	Balance Beam (Semi−Final)			8	8.850
2002	World Championships	Debrecen	Balance Beam (Qualification)			11	8.762
2002	European Championships	Patras	Team	7	101.011		
2002	European Championships	Patras	All-Around	8	35.810	9	35.074
2002	European Championships	Patras	Uneven Bars				8.500
2002	European Championships	Patras	Balance Beam				8.537
2002	European Championships	Patras	Floor Exercise				8.812
2001	World Championships	Ghent	Team			14	132.659
2001	World Championships	Ghent	All-Around	15	35.374	16	35.587
2001	World Championships	Ghent	Vault				8.925
2001	World Championships	Ghent	Uneven Bars				8.762
2001	World Championships	Ghent	Balance Beam				8.950
2001	World Championships	Ghent	Floor Exercise				8.950

- Competitor for Russia

Year	Competition Description	Location	Apparatus	Rank-Final	Score-Final	Rank-Qualifying	Score-Qualifying
2000	European Championships	Paris	Team	1	115.760		
1999	World Championships	Tianjin	Team	2	153.209	2	153.576
1999	World Championships	Tianjin	Uneven Bars			3	9.675
1998	European Championships	Saint Petersburg	Team	2	112.720		
1998	European Championships	Saint Petersburg	Uneven Bars	7	9.512	2	9.787
1998	European Championships	Saint Petersburg	Balance Beam	1	9.775	2	9.712
1997	World Championships	Lausanne	Team	2	153.197	1	153.401
1997	World Championships	Lausanne	All-Around	16	36.730	7	37.924
1997	World Championships	Lausanne	Vault			17	9.350
1997	World Championships	Lausanne	Uneven Bars	8	9.412	10	9.462
1997	World Championships	Lausanne	Balance Beam			13	9.425
1997	World Championships	Lausanne	Floor Exercise	WD		2	9.687
1996	Olympic Games	Atlanta	Team	2	388.404		
1996	Olympic Games	Atlanta	Vault			93	9.637
1996	Olympic Games	Atlanta	Uneven Bars			18	19.400
1996	Olympic Games	Atlanta	Balance Beam			14	19.112
1995	World Championships	Sabae	Team	4	384.689		
1995	World Championships	Sabae	All-Around			29	75.360
1995	World Championships	Sabae	Vault			28	18.812
1995	World Championships	Sabae	Uneven Bars			56	18.712
1995	World Championships	Sabae	Balance Beam			31	18.737
1995	World Championships	Sabae	Floor Exercise			37	19.099

== See also ==
- List of Olympic female gymnasts for Russia
- Nationality changes in gymnastics
