= Nataliya Horodniy =

Ukrainian gymnast (born 1984)

- Born: 19 October 1984 (age 41) unknown

Gymnastics career
- Discipline: Women's artistic gymnastics
- Country represented: Ukraine
- Retired: yes
Medal record
Women's artistic gymnastics
Representing Ukraine
World Championships
Bronze medal – third place	1999 Tianjin	Team
European Championships
Silver medal – second place	2000 Paris	Team
Junior European Championships
Gold medal – first place	1998 Saint Petersburg	Team
European Youth Olympic Festival
Bronze medal – third place	1999 Esbjerg	Vault

Nataliya Horodniy (born 19 October 1984) is a retired Ukrainian gymnast.

== Career ==
In 1998, Horodniy won a gold medal at the European Championships, held in Saint Petersburg, in team competition.

At the 1999 European Youth Summer Olympic Days Horodniy received a bronze medal in vault competition.

Later, at the 1999 World Artistic Gymnastics Championships she won a bronze medal in team competition.

The following year, Horodniy won a silver medal at the 2000 European Championships in team competition.
