= Anna Kovaleva =

Russian artistic gymnast

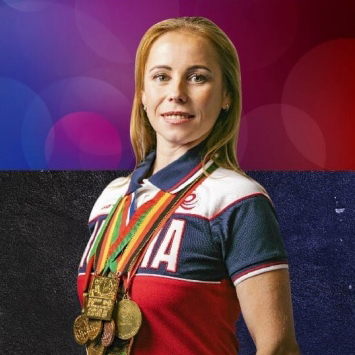
- Kovaleva in 2019

Personal information
- Full name: Anna Vasilyevna Kovaleva
- Alternative name: Anna Kovalyova
- Born: 18 January 1983 (age 43) Grigorovo, Novgorod Oblast, RSFSR, Soviet Union

Gymnastics career
- Discipline: Women's artistic gymnastics
- Country represented: Russia
- Head coaches: Elena Mashinskaya, Leonid Arkayev
- Retired: 2002
Medal record
World Championships
Silver medal – second place	1999 Tianjin	Team
Goodwill Games
Bronze medal – third place	1998 New York City	Mixed pairs

Anna Vasilyevna Kovaleva (Russian: Анна Васильевна Ковалёва; born 18 January 1983) is a Russian former artistic gymnast. She was a member of the silver medal-winning team at the 1999 World Championships. She won the all-around title at the 1998 Junior European Championships and a team gold medal at the 1996 Junior European Championships.

== Gymnastics career ==
Kovaleva won a gold medal in the team event at the 1996 Junior European Championships, and she placed fourth in the vault final. At the 1997 World Stars, she won gold medals on the vault and floor exercise.

Kovaleva placed sixth in the all-around at the 1998 American Cup. She then won the all-around title at the 1998 Junior European Championships. Additionally, she won another gold medal on the vault and bronze medals on the uneven bars and floor exercise. At the 1998 Goodwill Games, she competed with Alexei Bondarenko in the mixed pairs event, and they won the bronze medal. Individually, she advanced into the vault final and placed sixth. She won the all-around competition at the 1998 World Stars and also won gold medals on the vault, balance beam, and floor exercise.

Kovaleva placed third in the all-around at the 1999 Russian Cup, behind Yelena Produnova and Svetlana Khorkina. At the 1999 World Championships, she helped Russia win the team silver medal behind Romania.

Kovaleva finished eighth in the all-around at the 2000 Russian Cup. She was not selected for the 2000 Olympic team.

== Personal life ==
Kovaleva has a half-brother, Dmitri Lvov, who also competed in gymnastics and won a silver medal at the 1998 European Championships. After retiring from competitions, she worked as a gymnastics coach in Zelenograd and in Moscow. She has two sons.
