= Corina Ungureanu =

Romanian gymnast

- Full name: Corina Georgiana Ungureanu
- Born: 29 August 1980 (age 46) Ploiești, Romania

Gymnastics career
- Discipline: Women's artistic gymnastics
- Country represented: Romania
Medal record
World Championships
Gold medal – first place	1997 Lausanne	Team
Gold medal – first place	1999 Tianjin	Team
Goodwill Games
Bronze medal – third place	1998 New York	Floor Exercise
European Championships
Gold medal – first place	1998 St Petersburg	Team
Gold medal – first place	1998 St Petersburg	Floor exercise

Corina Georgiana Ungureanu (born 29 August 1980 in Ploiești) is a world-class Romanian artistic gymnast who competed internationally between 1993 and 1999. She was a member of two gold medal-winning World Championships teams and was the 1998 European Champion on the floor exercise.

== Career ==
Ungureanu began gymnastics at the Petrolul Ploieşti club in her hometown of Ploieşti, but spent the major part of her career training in Bucharest under Leana Sima. In the national training center in Deva, she was coached by Octavian Belu. Ungureanu's first international assignment was a junior dual meet between Romania and Germany, where she placed first with her team and eighth in the all-around. She resurfaced on the international scene again in 1996, when she won the all-around title at the EcoAir Cup. She did not compete in the 1996 Olympics, but was a member of the gold medal-winning Romanian teams at the 1997 and 1999 World Gymnastics Championships. She was forced to retire in 1999 due to a spinal cord injury.

== Nude posing ==
After retiring from gymnastics, she sparked some controversy by posing nude for the January 2000 edition of Playboy Romania. These pictures were reprinted in Playboy Japan in May 2000 and led to her producing a nude photobook in Japan later that year. Former teammates Lavinia Miloșovici and Claudia Presăcan, and Ungureanu earned world titles while on the Romanian team. Milosovici won two golds, one silver, and three bronze medals at the 1992 and 1996 Olympic Games. Presecan won an Olympic team gold medal in 2000. The three women appeared in two Japanese DVDs, Gold Bird and Euro Angels, performing gymnastics routines nude and topless.

A second nude photobook appeared at the same time. A number of photographs from the photobook and DVDs were subsequently published in the Japanese magazine Shukan Gendai. An edited version of the DVDs entitled 3 Gold Girls was released in Germany in 2004.

The DVDs proved controversial as some of the scenes and publicity material featured the gymnasts in their official Romanian team leotards. It later emerged that they had not been aware of the contractual obligation to wear their official leotards until filming had already begun. It was reported they were paid US$40,000. In the wake of the controversy, the Romanian Gymnastics Federation banned Ungureanu and her former teammates from coaching or refereeing in official competitions in Romania from 2002 to 2007. To compensate, Ungureanu spent some time coaching in Italy.

== Later life ==
In 2004, her authorized biography, Corina Ungureanu: Beginning and End, written by Laurian Stãnchescu was published. Ungureanu is now also a spokesmodel for Bucovina SA, a bottled water company in Romania. In early 2007 she took up a coaching position in England, alongside former colleague Claudia Presăcan.

Ungureanu posed for Playboy Romania again in March 2008.

== Major awards ==
- 1996 EcoAir Cup: 1st AA
- 1997 World Artistic Gymnastics Championships: 1st team
- 1997 International Team Championships: 1st team
- 1997 International Championship of Romania: 2nd AA
- 1997 Romanian Nationals: 2nd BB; 4th AA
- 1997 Germany-Romania dual meet: 1st team
- 1997 Romania-Italy-Ukraine tri-meet: 1st team; 4th AA
- 1998 Goodwill Games: 3rd BB; 3rd FX
- 1998 European Championships: 1st team, FX; 4th UB
- 1998 International Team Championships: 2nd team
- 1999 World Gymnastics Championships: 1st team

Key: AA: all-around; BB: balance beam; FX: floor exercise; UB: uneven bars; VT: vault
