= Olha Rozshchupkina =

Ukrainian artistic gymnast (born 1984)

Olga Roschupkina
- Born: 26 March 1984 (age 42)

Gymnastics career
- Country represented: Ukraine
Medal record
Representing Ukraine
World Championships
Bronze medal – third place	1999 Tianjin	Balance Beam
Bronze medal – third place	1999 Tianjin	Team
European Championships
Silver medal – second place	2000 Paris	Women's Team
Silver medal – second place	2001 Riesa	Mixed Team
European Youth Olympic Festival
Gold medal – first place	1999 Esbjerg	Individual Combined
Gold medal – first place	1999 Esbjerg	Asymmetric Bars
World Youth Games
Gold medal – first place	1998 Moscow	Uneven Bars
Silver medal – second place	1998 Moscow	Team
Bronze medal – third place	1998 Moscow	Floor
Bronze medal – third place	1998 Moscow	Balance Beam
Junior European Championships
Gold medal – first place	1998 Saint Petersburg	Team
Gold medal – first place	1998 Saint Petersburg	Balance Beam
Silver medal – second place	1998 Saint Petersburg	All-Around

Olga Roschupkina (born 26 March 1984) is a Ukrainian former artistic gymnast. She competed at the 2000 Summer Olympics, where she placed 7th in the all-around and 6th in the uneven bars event final.

She won women's team and balance beam bronze medal at the 1999 World Championships.

According to Roschupkina's Facebook page, she now lives in Canada working as a gymnastics coach for Queen City Gymnastics in Regina, Saskatchewan.

== See also ==
- List of Olympic female gymnasts for Ukraine
