= Andreea Răducan =

Romanian gymnast (born 1983)

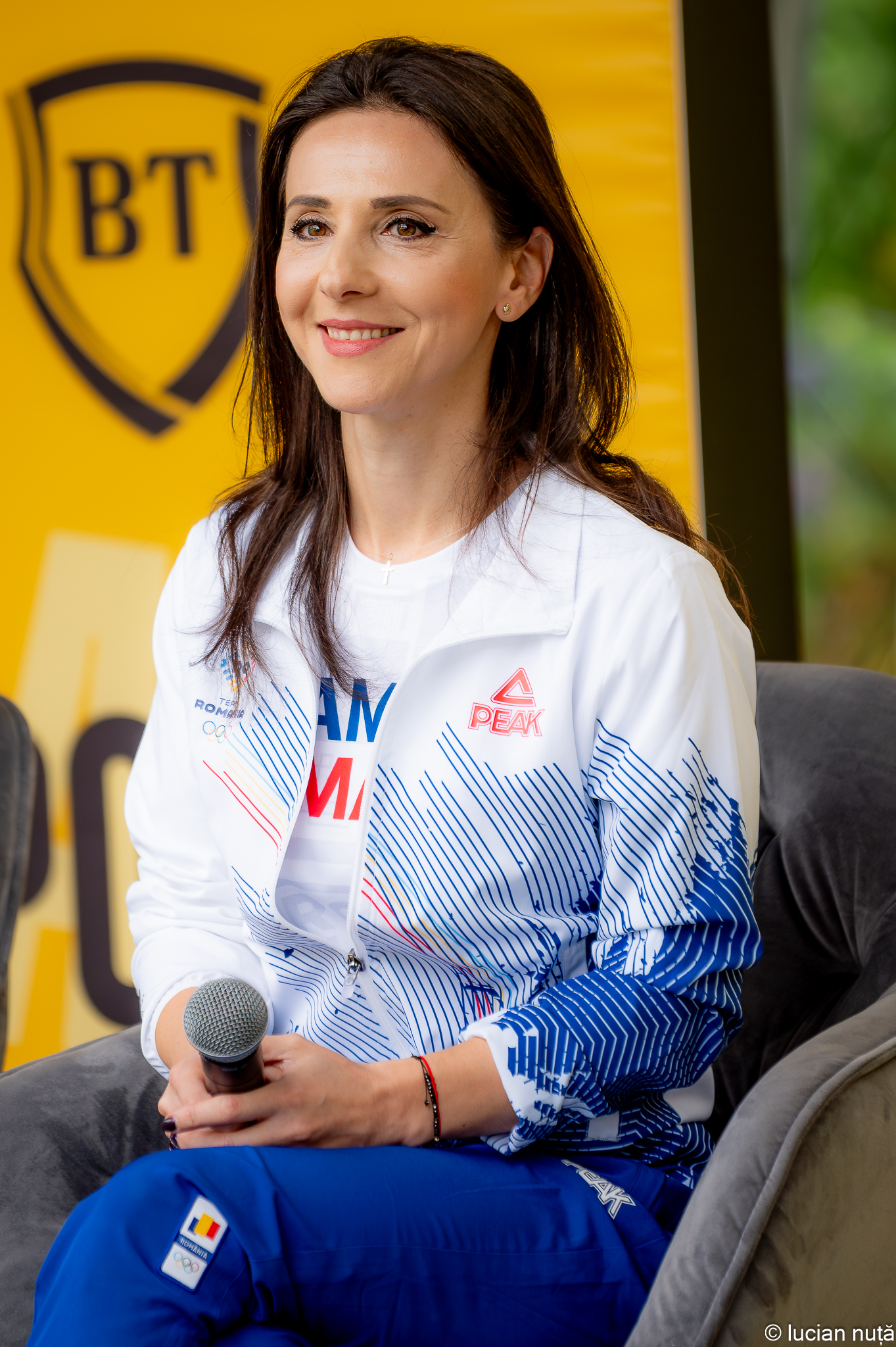
- Răducan in 2026

Personal information
- Full name: Andreea Mădălina Răducan
- Born: 30 September 1983 (age 42) Bârlad, Romania
- Height: 149 cm (4 ft 11 in)

Gymnastics career
- Discipline: Women's artistic gymnastics
- Country represented: Romania (1998–2002 (ROM))
- Club: Club Sportiv Cetate Deva, Farul Constanța
- Gym: Deva National Training Center
- Head coach: Octavian Bellu
- Assistant coaches: Mariana Bitang, Lucian Sandu
- Music: 1998–2001: Las Carretas del Rocio; 2000: Reel Around the Sun; 2001: Éclipse; 2002: Meet Her at the Love Parade and Right in the Night
- Retired: 6 January 2003
Medal record
Olympic Games
Gold medal – first place	2000 Sydney	Team
Silver medal – second place	2000 Sydney	Vault
Disqualified	2000 Sydney	All-Around
World Championships
Gold medal – first place	1999 Tianjin	Team
Gold medal – first place	1999 Tianjin	Floor
Gold medal – first place	2001 Ghent	Team
Gold medal – first place	2001 Ghent	Balance Beam
Gold medal – first place	2001 Ghent	Floor
Silver medal – second place	1999 Tianjin	Balance Beam
Bronze medal – third place	2001 Ghent	All-Around
Bronze medal – third place	2001 Ghent	Vault
World Cup Final
Gold medal – first place	2000 Glasgow	Balance Beam
Gold medal – first place	2000 Glasgow	Floor
European Championships
Silver medal – second place	Paris 2000	Floor
Bronze medal – third place	Paris 2000	Team

Andreea Mădălina Răducan (Romanian pronunciation: [anˈdre.e̯a mə.dəˈli.na rə.duˈkan]; born 30 September 1983) is a Romanian sports announcer, journalist, and retired gymnast.

Răducan began competing in gymnastics at a young age and was training at the Romanian junior national facility by the age of 12. As one of the outstanding gymnasts of the Romanian team in the late 1990s, Răducan was known both for her difficult repertoire of skills and her dance and presentation. Over her four-year senior career, she won Olympic or World Championships medals on every event except the uneven bars and earned three individual World Championships titles, on the floor exercise in 1999 and 2001 and the balance beam in 2001.

Răducan competed at the 2000 Sydney Olympics, where she contributed strongly to the Romanian team's gold medal and won an individual silver medal on the vault. She was also the original winner of the all-around title, but was disqualified and stripped of her gold medal shortly after the competition concluded, when it was revealed that she had failed doping controls, testing positive for pseudoephedrine, a banned substance. She and her coaches maintained that she had been given the substance in two cold medicine pills by a Romanian team physician, and that they had not affected her performance in any way.

The case generated a significant amount of media attention, and Răducan was supported by members of the gymnastics community and the Romanian public. Her case was brought to the Court of Arbitration for Sport in autumn 2000. Răducan herself was exonerated of any personal wrongdoing by the CAS, the Romanian Olympic Committee and the International Gymnastics Federation, and was not subject to any disciplinary measures. However, her medal was not reinstated, and the team doctor who administered the medicine was banned for two Olympic cycles.

Răducan returned the year after the Olympics to win five additional World Championships medals, but retired from gymnastics in 2002. As an adult, she has worked as a sports announcer and media personality, and has pursued university level studies in journalism.

== Early career ==
Răducan was one of the "new-generation gymnasts" groomed to take over the torch of Romanian gymnastics excellence after the retirements of the Olympic medalists Lavinia Miloșovici and Gina Gogean. She began gymnastics at the age of four and a half in her hometown of Bârlad. In 1996, after winning over twenty medals in local and regional competitions, she was invited to train at the Romanian junior team facility in Onești. Two years later, she was promoted to the national training center in Deva.

Răducan's first major international event was the 1998 Junior European Championships, where she won a silver medal on the balance beam, tied for bronze on the floor exercise and took fourth place in the all-around. The next year, she rose to the senior ranks and made an impact at the World Championships in Tianjin, China, winning the floor exercise final and placing fifth in the all-around.

While Răducan's work on the uneven bars was considered weak, her skills on beam, vault and floor exercise were applauded. She was also admired because, unlike other members of the Romanian team, she showed a great deal of expression in her choreography and a wide variety of complex skills in her routines.

== Sydney Olympics ==
Răducan competed well at the 2000 Olympic Games in Sydney, helping the Romanian women to win their first Olympic team gold medal since 1984. She qualified for the floor and vault event finals, and, along with her teammates Simona Amânar and Maria Olaru, the all-around final. In the preliminary round of competition she had the second highest all-around score of all competitors in the competition, trailing Russia's Svetlana Khorkina by 0.288.

The all-around final was mired in controversy. The vault was set 5 centimeters too low, creating a dangerous situation that completely altered the gymnasts' pre- and post-flights. As a result of the incorrectly set vault, many gymnasts suffered serious crashes and injuries during both the warm-ups and the competition, including Svetlana Khorkina. Even those who escaped injury found themselves shaken by their experiences on the vault. When the error was discovered in the third rotation, International Federation of Gymnastics officials reset the vault height and allowed the competition to continue. They did permit the gymnasts who had vaulted in the first two rotations to take another turn on vault and to be rescored; not every athlete accepted this offer.

Răducan was one of the gymnasts who had vaulted on the incorrectly set apparatus but did not suffer a fall on the event and performed without serious error. She continued through the competition, turning in strong performances on balance beam and floor exercise, and ended up winning the all-around gold medal. On the podium with her were her Romanian teammates: Amânar with silver and Olaru with bronze. Răducan was the first Romanian gymnast to win the Olympic all-around title since Nadia Comăneci in 1976; it was also the first time since 1960 that gymnasts from a single country swept the women's all-around podium at the Olympics. It was also the last time it was possible for three gymnasts from the same country to sweep the all-around, as the "two per country rule" was introduced in the next Olympic cycle. Răducan went on to win the silver medal in the vault final, behind Elena Zamolodchikova of Russia and ahead of Ekaterina Lobazniouk of Russia. Speculations around the all around gold arose and Răducan was informed that there was a possibility that she could be stripped of her gold medal. This affected her mentally and she went to the floor final fazed by the situation. She fell on her third tumbling pass, and received a score of 9.275. Without that error, she would have scored a 9.775, which would have been enough for the bronze medal.

=== Doping charge ===
Several days after the competition concluded, the International Olympic Committee announced that Răducan had tested positive for pseudoephedrine, a banned substance.

Răducan and her coaches maintained that she was innocent. As a minor, they argued that she had only followed the treatment plan recommended by Ioachim Oană, the team physician. In the book she published in 2010, Răducan states that a few hours before the competition she had been given Nurofen Cold & Flu, a common over-the-counter medication containing pseudoephedrine, to help treat a fever and cough. She also said that the pills had made her feel dizzy instead of helping her in any way.

Despite strenuous appeals from Răducan, her coaches, the Romanian Gymnastics Federation, and certain members of the gymnastics community, she was stripped of the gold medal. The gold was re-awarded to Amânar, Olaru was promoted to silver, and former fourth-place finisher Liu Xuan from China was given the bronze medal. Răducan's test samples from the team and vault event finals were clean; she was therefore allowed to keep the medals she won in these competitions. The Romanian team doctor who gave Răducan the drug in two cold medicine pills was expelled from the Games and suspended through the 2002 Winter Olympics at Salt Lake City and the 2004 Summer Olympics in Athens.

Both Amânar and Olaru expressed their belief that Răducan was the deserving all-around gold medalist, as did Liu Xuan, who noted, "I think the all-around champ (Răducan) is very good. I feel very sad and sorry for her that this problem occurred. I can't make sense of it. ...In gymnastics, we rely on technique to complete our moves. It's not possible to rely on drugs or strength, you have to rely on skill." All three declined a formal ceremony when the medals were re-awarded. Following the announcement that Răducan would be stripped of her medal, Olaru and Amânar initially decided to refuse their new medals. However, they changed their minds in order to bring the medals back to Romania. Amânar said of the gold medal, "I didn't win it. It was won by Andreea and belongs to Andreea." It was thought that Amânar had given Răducan the gold medal back once the team returned to Romania, but Răducan herself is quoted as saying, in an interview with gymnastics podcast Gymcastic:

The medal belongs to her. She says that she doesn't want this medal, that it belongs to me. But she has to accept no matter, however, for Romania. We are just fine. We don't have a problem. So she has the gold medal.

=== Aftermath ===
Răducan's case was brought before the Court of Arbitration for Sport in late September 2000. While the arbitration panel did concede that Răducan had not gained any advantage by taking the pseudoephedrine, and that she was an underage athlete who had followed her team physician's instructions, they also upheld the IOC's decision. The basis for their decision was the belief that the Anti-Doping Code of the Olympics had to be enforced "without compromise", regardless of the intentions or age of the athlete.

Răducan was exonerated of any personal wrongdoing by the Romanian Olympic Committee, and therefore was not subjected to the sporting ban usually imposed on athletes involved in doping cases. However, Ion Țiriac, the president of the Romanian Olympic Committee (ROC), resigned over the scandal. The executive committee of the International Gymnastics Federation (FIG) also unanimously decided not to impose any suspension or punishment on Răducan, taking the stance that losing her medal "was punishment enough for an athlete who was innocent in this situation". The FIG, IOC and ROC all agreed with the punishment and suspension of Dr. Oană, viewing him as the guilty party for administering the banned substance to Răducan and her teammate. Oană was permitted to keep his medical license and cleared of malpractice by the Deva Physicians' Association, who stated that he had not committed any offense "from a medical perspective".

Despite the controversy, Răducan was still seen as a positive and even sympathetic figure. She received a significant amount of support in Romania, and members of the gymnastics community, including Nadia Comăneci, publicly expressed their support. On returning to Romania with her teammates, she was personally greeted and presented with flowers by Romanian President Emil Constantinescu. Răducan was given a replacement medal in pure gold by a Romanian jeweler; she also received several endorsements and sponsorships. At one point, a Răducan doll was even rumored to be in the works. In addition, the prize money she would have been awarded from the Romanian Olympic Committee for her all-around gold was replaced, and doubled, by a group of Romanian businessmen. She, along with Amanar, was awarded a diplomatic passport by the Romanian government for being a "good ambassador for Romania".

== After Sydney ==
Răducan continued to train in Deva after the Olympics. With the retirement of her Sydney teammates Amânar, Olaru, and Presăcan, she found herself one of the senior gymnasts at Deva. At the 2001 World Championships in Ghent, Belgium, she was part of the gold medal-winning Romanian team and picked up four individual medals: gold on floor exercise and balance beam and bronze in the all-around and vault. Injuries and other concerns marred her training in 2002, and after a poor showing at the Worlds in Hungary, she quietly retired.

After retiring, Răducan became a sports announcer in Romania. Her assignments for EuroSport have included the 2004 Olympics in Athens. She also has her own television show and does modelling and promotional work. Răducan also has a master's degree in journalism from the University of Bucharest.

In 2010, Răducan released her autobiography, The Other Side of the Medal, which provides further insight into the disqualification of her all-around result at the 2000 Olympic Games. The 2020 "Golden Girl" film, directed by Adrian Robe and Denisa Morariu-Tamas, covers her attempt to reclaim her title.

== President of Romanian Federation ==
On 4 August 2017, Andreea Răducan was elected president of the Romanian Gymnastics Federation (RGF). She took over from Adrian Stoica, who was the President of the Federation for 12 years. It was expected to be a huge challenge for Răducan to improve the performances of the Romanian team, who did not qualify a full team to compete at the 2016 Olympic Games in Rio de Janeiro, Brazil. The failure to qualify marked the first time Romania did not field a gymnastics team at the Games since 1968.

Drawing on the success of Romania successfully hosting the European Gymnastics Championships 18–23 April 2017, Romania was expected to contend for the all-around and individual titles at the 2017 World Gymnastics Championships in Montreal, Canada. Unfortunately, their arguably best all-around gymnast Larisa Iordache suffered a torn Achilles tendon during warm-up for qualifying. Romania's other hope for a medal, Cătălina Ponor, multiple medal winner in her gymnastics career, failed to qualify in either of the events she competed – beam or floor.

She stepped down from her position upon the failure of either the women's or men's teams qualifying for the 2020 Summer Olympics.

== Competitive skills ==
- Vault: Round-off 1/2 twist on, front layout off.
- Balance beam: full twisting back salto, double pike back dismount, tucked Korbut
- Floor exercise: Double laid-out salto, Whip salto (immediate connection) Back-double pike salto, 2.5 twisting back layout (immediate connection) punch-layout-front, Triple-twisting back layout.

== Floor music ==
- 1998–2000: "Las Carretas del Rocio" by the Orquestra Española de Juan Alfonso
- 2000: "Reel Around The Sun" from the album Riverdance by Bill Whelan
- 2001: "Éclipse" from the album Nouvelle Expérience by René Dupere
- 2002: "Meet Her At The Love Parade" by Da Hool and "Right in the Night" by Jam & Spoon featuring Plavka

== Competitive history ==
Year	Event	Team	AA	VT	UB	BB	FX
1998
1998	Junior European Championships		4			2nd place, silver medalist(s)	3rd place, bronze medalist(s)
1998	Chunichi Cup		7				
1998	Junior International Team Championships	3rd place, bronze medalist(s)	2nd place, silver medalist(s)				
1999	Arthur Gander Memorial		3rd place, bronze medalist(s)				
1999	Massilia Gym Cup		2nd place, silver medalist(s)				
1999	International Mixed Pairs	1st place, gold medalist(s)	4				
1999	Swiss Cup			2nd place, silver medalist(s)	3rd place, bronze medalist(s)	3rd place, bronze medalist(s)	2nd place, silver medalist(s)
1999	World Championships	1st place, gold medalist(s)	5				1st place, gold medalist(s)
2000
2000	European Championships	3rd place, bronze medalist(s)					2nd place, silver medalist(s)
2000	Olympic Games	1st place, gold medalist(s)	DQ	2nd place, silver medalist(s)			7
2000	Chunichi Cup		2nd place, silver medalist(s)				
2000	Cottbus World Cup			7		2nd place, silver medalist(s)	
2000	National Championships		1st place, gold medalist(s)				
2001	Chunichi Cup		4				
2001	Romanian International		1st place, gold medalist(s)				
2001	National Championships		3rd place, bronze medalist(s)				
2001	Massilia Gym Cup		1st place, gold medalist(s)				
2001	World Championships	1st place, gold medalist(s)	3rd place, bronze medalist(s)	3rd place, bronze medalist(s)		1st place, gold medalist(s)	1st place, gold medalist(s)

== See also ==
- Doping at the Olympic Games
- List of doping cases in sport
- List of Olympic female artistic gymnasts for Romania
- List of top female medalists at major artistic gymnastics events
