= Miho Takenaka =

Japanese artistic gymnast

- Born: October 22, 1984 (age 41) Aichi, Japan

Gymnastics career
- Discipline: Women's artistic gymnastics
- Country represented: Japan (1999)

Miho Takenaka (竹中 美穂, Takenaka Miho; born 22 October 1984) was a Japanese female artistic gymnast, representing her nation at international competitions.

She participated at the 2000 Summer Olympics. She also competed at world championships, including the 1999 World Artistic Gymnastics Championships, and 2003 World Artistic Gymnastics Championships.
