= Maria Olaru =

Romanian gymnast (born 1982)

- Born: 4 June 1982 (age 44) Fălticeni, Romania
- Height: 160 cm (5 ft 3 in)

Gymnastics career
- Discipline: Women's artistic gymnastics
- Country represented: Romania (1993–2000 (ROM))
- Retired: 2000
Medal record
Olympic Games
Gold medal – first place	2000 Sydney	Team
Silver medal – second place	2000 Sydney	All-Around
World Championships
Gold medal – first place	1999 Tianjin	Team
Gold medal – first place	1999 Tianjin	All-Around
Bronze medal – third place	1999 Tianjin	Vault
European Championships
Gold medal – first place	1998 St Petersburg	Team
Silver medal – second place	1998 St Petersburg	Vault

Maria Olaru (born 4 June 1982) is a Romanian former Olympic artistic gymnast. She is an Olympic, World, and European gold medalist with the team. Individually, she was the 1999 all-around world champion and the 2000 Olympic all-around silver medalist. Her best event was the vault on which she medaled at world and continental competitions. Olaru was one of the tallest gymnasts competing in the late 1990s, standing 160 cm (5 ft 3 in). After retirement she became an assistant professor at the Faculty of Sports and Physical Education of the West University of Timișoara.

== Early life and career ==
Born in Fălticeni, Olaru began gymnastics at the age of six there, but quickly transferred to the local gymnastics club in Deva. She moved up to the junior national team in 1993, but after six months, she returned to her home club. In 1995 she rejoined the junior team in Bucharest. Olaru graduated to the Deva national training facility in 1996, after winning gold on vault at the Junior European Championships. In the same year she also won the Top Gym Trophy in Charleroi, Belgium.

== Senior career ==
In 1998 Olaru moved up to senior competition, taking first place with the Romanian team and second on vault at the European Championships. The following year, she contributed to the team gold medal at the 1999 World Championships in Tianjin, China and became the second Romanian gymnast in history, after Aurelia Dobre, to win the all-around title. In 2000, she was, with Simona Amânar, Loredana Boboc, Andreea Isărescu, Claudia Presăcan and Andreea Răducan, a member of the Romanian team at the 2000 Olympics. There she shared in the team gold medal and won a silver in the all-around (after the Răducan controversy). She also qualified for the balance beam event final and placed sixth.

== Post-retirement ==
Olaru retired after the 2000 Olympics, noting that the new Code of Points would not be suited to gymnasts of her height, and enrolled as a student at the West University of Timișoara. After graduation she continued her studies, and she became an assistant professor at the Faculty of Sports and Physical Education of the West University of Timișoara.

In 2016, Olaru published her autobiography, The Price of Gold. Uncomfortable Sincerity. In it, she recounted how she and her Romanian teammates were hit and beaten by their coaches during training.

== Skills ==
- Vault: Double-twisting Yurchenko, Phelps
- Uneven Bars: Kip cast to handstand 1.5 handstand pirouette to mixed grip giant, immediate pike Jaeger; giant 1.5 pirouette into Tkatchev, Pak salto, Back-in Full-out tucked dismount
- Balance Beam: piked front mount, wolf jump, tucked Korbut; flip flop, full (or flip flop, layout step out, Korbut); switch side; front tuck, tuck jump; 3/4 twisting Shushonova; cartwheel, swing through double full dismount
- Floor Exercise: Round-off, whip back, 2.5 twist, punch pike; front-handspring, front double twist, punch front; Round-off, back-handspring, triple twist. Her music for floor routines was:
  - 1999: "Invisible Circus" by Vienna Symphony Orchestra
  - 2000: Soundtrack from the film Black Cat, White Cat
