= 1999 World Artistic Gymnastics Championships =

Gymnastics competition

- Venue: Tianjin Arena
- Location: Tianjin, China
- Start date: October 10, 1999
- End date: October 16, 1999

The 34th Artistic Gymnastics World Championships were held at Tianjin Arena in Tianjin, China in 1999.

== Results ==
Event	Gold	Silver	Bronze
Men
Team all-around	China; Dong Zhen; Huang Xu; Li Xiaopeng; Lu Yufu; Xing Aowei; Yang Wei	Russia; Alexei Bondarenko; Nikolai Kryukov; Alexei Nemov; Maxim Aleshin; Rashid Kasumov; Evgeni Podgorni	Belarus; Ivan Ivankov; Alexander Kruzhylov; Dmitry Kasperovich; Aleksandr Shostak; Vitaly Rudnitski; Ivan Pavlovski
Individual all-around	(Russia) Nikolai Kryukov	(Japan) Naoya Tsukahara	(Bulgaria) Yordan Yovchev
Floor	(Russia) Alexei Nemov	(Spain) Gervasio Deferr	(China) Xing Aowei
Pommel horse	(Russia) Alexei Nemov	(Romania) Marius Urzică	(Russia) Nikolai Kryukov
Rings	(China) Dong Zhen	(Hungary) Szilveszter Csollány	(Greece) Demosthenes Tampakos
Vault	(China) Li Xiaopeng	(Latvia) Jevgēņijs Saproņenko	(Switzerland) Dieter Rehm
Parallel bars	(South Korea) Lee Joo-Hyung	(Russia) Alexei Bondarenko (Japan) Naoya Tsukahara	none awarded
Horizontal bar	(Spain) Jesús Carballo	(Canada) Alexander Jeltkov	(China) Yang Wei
Women
Team all-around	Romania; Maria Olaru; Andreea Răducan; Simona Amânar; Andreea Isărescu; Corina Ungureanu; Loredana Boboc	Russia; Yelena Produnova; Elena Zamolodchikova; Svetlana Khorkina; Yekaterina Lobaznyuk; Yevgeniya Kuznetsova; Anna Kovaleva	Ukraine; Viktoria Karpenko; Tatiana Yarosh; Inha Shkarupa; Olga Teslenko; Olga Roschupkina; Nataliya Horodniy
Individual all-around	(Romania) Maria Olaru	(Ukraine) Viktoria Karpenko	(Russia) Elena Zamolodchikova
Vault	(Russia) Elena Zamolodchikova	(Romania) Simona Amânar	(Romania) Maria Olaru
Uneven bars	(Russia) Svetlana Khorkina	(China) Huang Mandan	(China) Ling Jie
Balance beam	(China) Ling Jie	(Romania) Andreea Răducan	(Ukraine) Olga Roschupkina
Floor	(Romania) Andreea Răducan	(Romania) Simona Amânar	(Russia) Svetlana Khorkina

**The Ukrainian Women's Gymnastics Team was awarded the bronze in 2011 after China was disqualified due to Dong Fongxiao being underage at the time of competing.

== Medal table ==
=== Overall ===
Rank	Nation	Gold	Silver	Bronze	Total
1	Russia (RUS)	5	3	3	11
2	China (CHN)	4	1	3	8
3	Romania (ROU)	3	4	1	8
4	Spain (ESP)	1	1	0	2
5	South Korea (KOR)	1	0	0	1
6	Japan (JPN)	0	2	0	2
7	Ukraine (UKR)	0	1	2	3
8	Canada (CAN)	0	1	0	1
8	Hungary (HUN)	0	1	0	1
8	Latvia (LAT)	0	1	0	1
11	Belarus (BLR)	0	0	1	1
11	Bulgaria (BUL)	0	0	1	1
11	Greece (GRE)	0	0	1	1
11	Switzerland (SWI)	0	0	1	1
Totals (14 entries)		14	15	13	42

=== Men ===
Rank	Nation	Gold	Silver	Bronze	Total
1	Russia	3	2	1	6
2	China	3	0	2	5
3	Spain	1	1	0	2
4	South Korea	1	0	0	1
5	Japan	0	2	0	2
6	Canada	0	1	0	1
6	Hungary	0	1	0	1
6	Latvia	0	1	0	1
6	Romania	0	1	0	1
10	Belarus	0	0	1	1
10	Bulgaria	0	0	1	1
10	Greece	0	0	1	1
10	Switzerland	0	0	1	1
Totals (13 entries)		8	9	7	24

=== Women ===
Rank	Nation	Gold	Silver	Bronze	Total
1	Romania	3	3	1	7
2	Russia	2	1	2	5
3	China	1	1	1	3
4	Ukraine	0	1	2	3
Totals (4 entries)		6	6	6	18

== Men ==
=== Team Final ===
Rank	Team	Floor (gymnastics)	Pommel horse	Rings (gymnastics)	Vault (gymnastics)	Parallel bars	Horizontal bar	Total
1st place, gold medalist(s)	China	38.012 (1)	38.324 (2)	38.649 (1)	38.549 (2)	38.787 (1)	38.074 (1)	230.395
1st place, gold medalist(s)	Yang Wei	9.525	9.362	9.725	9.200	9.650	9.425	230.395
1st place, gold medalist(s)	Lu Yufu	9.425	9.637	9.462	9.737	9.675	8.887	230.395
1st place, gold medalist(s)	Huang Xu	9.212	9.600	9.560	9.500	9.650	9.525	230.395
1st place, gold medalist(s)	Li Xiaopeng	9.587	-	9.600	9.737	9.762	9.687	230.395
1st place, gold medalist(s)	Xing Aowei	9.475	9.725	-	9.575	9.700	9.437	230.395
1st place, gold medalist(s)	Dong Zhen	-	9.237	9.762	-	-	-	230.395
2nd place, silver medalist(s)	Russia	37.624 (2)	38.799 (1)	37.361 (6)	38.649 (1)	38.187 (2)	37.525 (6)	228.145
2nd place, silver medalist(s)	Alexei Bondarenko	9.625	9.725	9.637	9.762	9.725	9.350	228.145
2nd place, silver medalist(s)	Nikolai Kryukov	9.187	9.737	9.612	9.737	9.587	9.600	228.145
2nd place, silver medalist(s)	Maxim Aleshin	9.175	9.587	8.750	9.512	9.400	8.600	228.145
2nd place, silver medalist(s)	Evgeni Podgorni	9.150	9.525	8.587	9.550	-	9.000	228.145
2nd place, silver medalist(s)	Alexei Nemov	9.637	9.750	-	9.600	9.475	-	228.145
2nd place, silver medalist(s)	Rashid Kasumov	-	-	9.362	-	9.375	9.575	228.145
3rd place, bronze medalist(s)	Belarus	37.599 (3)	37.862 (5)	38.424 (2)	37.586 (6)	38.186 (3)	37.974 (2)	227.631
3rd place, bronze medalist(s)	Ivan Ivankov	9.600	9.725	9.712	9.487	9.575	9.600	227.631
3rd place, bronze medalist(s)	Dmitri Kasperovich	9.100	-	9.550	9.725	9.637	9.537	227.631
3rd place, bronze medalist(s)	Alexander Kruzhylov	9.387	9.300	-	9.312	9.487	9.450	227.631
3rd place, bronze medalist(s)	Alexander Shostak	-	9.525	9.512	8.975	9.450	8.925	227.631
3rd place, bronze medalist(s)	Alexei Sinkevich	9.075	9.225	8.362	9.062	-	9.387	227.631
3rd place, bronze medalist(s)	Vitaly Rudnitski	9.512	9.312	9.650	-	9.487	-	227.631
4	Japan	36.161 (6)	38.199 (3)	37.962 (3)	38.287 (3)	37.637 (5)	37.662 (5)	225.908
4	Naoya Tsukahara	9.200	9.662	9.525	9.450	9.625	9.625	225.908
4	Yoshihiro Saito	9.062	9.475	9.525	9.387	9.450	9.600	225.908
4	Akihiro Kasamatsu	9.237	9.662	8.712	9.525	9.425	9.450	225.908
4	Kenichi Fujita	7.900	9.000	9.375	9.750	-	8.987	225.908
4	Mutsumi Harada	8.662	9.400	-	9.562	8.275	-	225.908
4	Tatsuya Yamada	-	-	9.537	-	9.137	8.262	225.908
5	South Korea	36.374 (5)	37.625 (6)	37.737 (4)	38.286 (4)	38.124 (4)	37.724 (3)	225.870
5	Lee Joo-Hyung	9.187	9.600	9.525	9.512	9.700	9.625	225.870
5	Kim Dong-Hwa	9.487	8.750	9.550	9.600	9.112	8.725	225.870
5	Jung Jin-Soo	-	8.925	9.387	9.612	9.612	9.362	225.870
5	Cho Seong-Min	9.275	-	9.275	9.537	9.550	9.237	225.870
5	Lee Jang-Hyung	8.200	9.600	-	-	9.262	9.500	225.870
5	Lee Kyung-Ki	8.425	9.500	8.512	9.537	-	-	225.870
6	United States	36.912 (4)	37.974 (4)	37.711 (5)	37.750 (5)	37.137 (6)	37.712 (4)	225.196
6	Blaine Wilson	9.412	9.550	9.612	9.725	8.962	9.537	225.196
6	John Roethlisberger	-	9.575	9.612	-	9.300	8.725	225.196
6	Sean Townsend	9.250	-	9.225	9.325	9.437	9.400	225.196
6	Yewki Tomita	9.325	9.575	-	9.125	9.225	9.175	225.196
6	Chris Young	8.450	8.812	-	9.575	9.175	9.600	225.196
6	Stephen McCain	8.925	9.312	9.262	8.887	-	-	225.196

=== All-around ===
Rank	Gymnast	Floor (gymnastics)	Pommel horse	Rings (gymnastics)	Vault (gymnastics)	Parallel bars	Horizontal bar	Total
1st place, gold medalist(s)	Nikolai Kryukov (RUS)	9.437	9.612	9.362	9.725	9.712	9.637	57.485
2nd place, silver medalist(s)	Naoya Tsukahara (JPN)	9.500	9.550	9.350	9.612	9.675	9.650	57.337
3rd place, bronze medalist(s)	Yordan Yovchev (BUL)	9.712	9.600	9.600	9.450	9.350	9.500	57.212
4	Blaine Wilson (USA)	9.600	9.487	9.325	9.687	9.612	9.500	57.211
5	Lu Yufu (CHN)	9.125	9.625	9.537	9.737	9.537	9.525	57.086
6	Alexei Nemov (RUS)	9.725	9.725	8.737	9.637	9.537	9.612	56.973
7	Lee Joo-Hyung (KOR)	9.287	9.437	9.325	9.512	9.650	9.625	56.836
8	Alexander Beresh (UKR)	9.400	9.637	8.912	9.650	9.525	9.662	56.786
9	Roman Zozulia (UKR)	8.937	9.637	9.412	9.587	9.625	9.575	56.773
10	Alexei Bondarenko (RUS)	9.725	9.375	9.450	9.200	9.600	9.387	56.737
11	Huang Xu (CHN)	8.987	9.637	9.512	9.562	9.725	9.237	56.660
12	Yang Wei (CHN)	9.612	8.600	9.487	9.662	9.600	9.612	56.573
13	Andreas Wecker (GER)	9.062	9.537	9.475	9.062	9.650	9.587	56.373
14	Florent Marée (FRA)	9.450	9.425	8.987	9.275	9.425	9.500	56.062
15	Yoshihiro Saito (JPN)	9.225	9.475	9.350	9.400	8.950	9.600	56.000
16	Alexander Svetlichnyi (UKR)	9.087	9.612	8.900	9.175	9.637	9.425	55.836
17	Akihiro Kasamatsu (JPN)	9.600	9.650	8.850	9.362	8.950	9.375	55.787
18	Yann Cucherat (FRA)	9.212	8.525	9.375	9.450	9.487	9.575	55.624
19	Jesús Carballo (ESP)	9.225	8.625	9.400	9.000	9.600	9.687	55.537
20	Zoltán Supola (HUN)	8.837	9.662	8.937	9.262	9.175	9.662	55.535
21	Dorin Petcu (ROU)	9.087	9.575	8.387	9.512	9.212	9.462	55.235
22	Omar Cortes (ESP)	8.725	8.950	9.400	9.250	9.350	9.537	55.212
23	Florentin Pescaru (ROU)	9.325	9.612	8.650	9.312	9.362	8.862	55.123
24	Jan-Peter Nikiferow (GER)	9.212	9.650	8.250	9.137	9.500	9.075	54.824
25	Yewki Tomita (USA)	8.987	9.587	8.175	9.100	9.400	9.300	54.549
26	Marian Drăgulescu (ROU)	8.450	9.487	9.187	9.425	9.237	8.650	54.436
27	Ilia Giorgadze (GEO)	8.200	9.600	8.850	9.037	9.200	9.487	54.374
28	Alexander Jelkov (CAN)	9.200	8.875	7.950	9.187	8.662	9.675	53.549
29	Ioannis Melissanidis (GRE)	8.600	8.337	8.337	9.837	8.775	9.275	53.161
30	Dieter Rehm (SUI)	8.037	8.562	7.900	9.175	9.475	9.575	52.724
31	Dimitar Lunchev (BUL)	8.762	8.650	8.100	9.175	9.400	8.600	52.687
32	Craig Heap (GBR)	7.425	8.975	9.025	9.187	8.825	9.075	52.512
33	Alexei Dimitrienko (KAZ)	7.587	9.175	8.787	9.425	8.425	8.487	51.886
34	Igor Vikhrovs (LAT)	9.612	8.562	8.050	9.512	8.725	6.950	51.411
35	Ivan Ivankov (BLR)	-	-	-	-	-	7.975	7.975

=== Floor Exercise ===
Rank	Gymnast	Total
1st place, gold medalist(s)	Alexei Nemov (RUS)	9.787
2nd place, silver medalist(s)	Gervasio Deferr (ESP)	9.750
3rd place, bronze medalist(s)	Xing Aowei (CHN)	9.737
4	Vitaly Rudnitski (BLR)	9.637
4	Ioannis Melissanidis (GRE)	9.637
4	Yang Wei (CHN)	9.637
7	Dmitri Karbonenko (FRA)	9.600
8	Alexei Bondarenko (RUS)	8.637

=== Pommel Horse ===
Rank	Gymnast	Total
1st place, gold medalist(s)	Alexei Nemov (RUS)	9.775
2nd place, silver medalist(s)	Marius Urzică (ROU)	9.762
3rd place, bronze medalist(s)	Nikolai Kryukov (RUS)	9.750
4	Alexander Beresch (UKR)	9.725
5	Andreas Wecker (GER)	9.712
6	Valeri Belenki (GER)	9.700
7	Xing Aowei (CHN)	9.662
8	Lee Joo-Hyung (KOR)	9.650

=== Rings ===
Rank	Gymnast	Total
1st place, gold medalist(s)	Dong Zhen (CHN)	9.775
2nd place, silver medalist(s)	Szilveszter Csollány (HUN)	9.737
3rd place, bronze medalist(s)	Demosthenes Tampakos (GRE)	9.712
4	Yordan Yovchev (BUL)	9.675
5	Andrea Coppolino (ITA)	9.673
6	Jesús Carballo (ESP)	9.625
7	Roberto Galli (ITA)	9.562
7	Yoshihiro Saito (JPN)	9.562

=== Vault ===
Rank	Gymnast	Total
1st place, gold medalist(s)	Li Xiaopeng (CHN)	9.668
2nd place, silver medalist(s)	Jevgēņijs Saproņenko (LAT)	9.656
3rd place, bronze medalist(s)	Dieter Rehm (SUI)	9.468
4	Marian Drăgulescu (ROU)	9.174
5	Sergei Fedorchenko (KAZ)	9.043
6	Rene Tschernitschek (GER)	8.925
7	Ioannis Melissanidis (GRE)	8.606
8	Yang Wei (CHN)	8.281

=== Parallel Bars ===
Rank	Gymnast	Total
1st place, gold medalist(s)	Lee Joo-Hyung (KOR)	9.750
2nd place, silver medalist(s)	Alexei Bondarenko (RUS)	9.675
2nd place, silver medalist(s)	Naoya Tsukahara (JPN)	9.675
4	Nikolai Kryukov (RUS)	9.625
5	Jung Jin-soo (KOR)	9.187
6	Li Xiaopeng (CHN)	9.137
7	Xing Aowei (CHN)	9.075
8	Jong U-Chol (PRK)	8.975

=== Horizontal Bar ===
Rank	Gymnast	Total
1st place, gold medalist(s)	Jesús Carballo (ESP)	9.762
2nd place, silver medalist(s)	Alexander Jeltkov (CAN)	9.700
3rd place, bronze medalist(s)	Yang Wei (CHN)	9.612
4	Yoshihiro Saito (JPN)	9.587
5	Lazaro Lamelas (CUB)	9.200
6	Omar Cortes (ESP)	9.087
7	Lee Joo-Hyung (KOR)	8.925
8	Marian Drăgulescu (ROU)	8.762

== Women ==
=== Team ===
Rank	Team	Vault (gymnastics)	Uneven bars	Balance beam	Floor (gymnastics)	Total
1st place, gold medalist(s)	Romania	38.180 (1)	38.474 (3)	37.786 (1)	39.087 (1)	153.527
1st place, gold medalist(s)	Maria Olaru	9.650	9.637	9.687	9.775	153.527
1st place, gold medalist(s)	Andreea Răducan	9.468	9.612	9.687	9.800	153.527
1st place, gold medalist(s)	Simona Amânar	9.656	9.700	8.987	9.812	153.527
1st place, gold medalist(s)	Andreea Isărescu	9.406	9.525	9.425		153.527
1st place, gold medalist(s)	Corina Ungureanu		9.412	8.200	9.700	153.527
1st place, gold medalist(s)	Loredana Boboc	9.362			9.700	153.527
2nd place, silver medalist(s)	Russia	37.835 (2)	38.899 (1)	37.625 (3)	38.850 (2)	153.209
2nd place, silver medalist(s)	Elena Produnova	9.368	9.750	9.350	9.750	153.209
2nd place, silver medalist(s)	Elena Zamolodchikova	9.699	9.637		9.675	153.209
2nd place, silver medalist(s)	Svetlana Khorkina	9.256	9.825	9.075	9.800	153.209
2nd place, silver medalist(s)	Ekaterina Lobaznyuk	9.456	9.575	9.600	9.625	153.209
2nd place, silver medalist(s)	Yevgeniya Kuznetsova		9.687	9.600		153.209
2nd place, silver medalist(s)	Anna Kovaleva	9.312		8.725	9.087	153.209
3rd place, bronze medalist(s)	Ukraine	37.492 (4)	38.586 (2)	37.736 (2)	38.524 (3)	152.338
3rd place, bronze medalist(s)	Viktoria Karpenko	9.512	9.737	9.512	9.625	152.338
3rd place, bronze medalist(s)	Tatiana Yarosh	9.256		9.662	9.712	152.338
3rd place, bronze medalist(s)	Inha Shkarupa	9.418	9.487		9.650	152.338
3rd place, bronze medalist(s)	Olga Teslenko		9.675	9.000	9.537	152.338
3rd place, bronze medalist(s)	Olga Roschupkina	8.862	9.687	9.225		152.338
3rd place, bronze medalist(s)	Nataliya Horodniy	9.306	8.862	9.337	9.312	152.338
4	Australia	37.298 (5)	38.111 (4)	37.224 (4)	38.299 (4)	150.932
4	Allana Slater	9.181	9.637	9.637	9.512	150.932
4	Lisa Skinner	9.262	9.537	9.125	9.625	150.932
4	Trudy McIntosh	9.474	9.400	9.387	9.662	150.932
4	Brooke Walker	9.031	9.512	9.075	9.500	150.932
4	Jacqui Dunn		9.437	8.512	9.037	150.932
4	Jenny Smith	9.381				150.932
5	United States	37.578 (3)	37.387 (5)	37.024 (5)	38.224 (5)	150.213
5	Elise Ray	9.287	9.725	9.450	9.725	150.213
5	Kristen Maloney	9.424	9.212	9.550	9.662	150.213
5	Vanessa Atler	9.599	9.075	8.025	9.512	150.213
5	Jamie Dantzscher	9.268			9.325	150.213
5	Morgan White		9.200	9.262		150.213
5	Jeanette Antolin	9.231	9.250	8.762	9.312	150.213
DQ	China	36.774 (-)	38.899 (-)	38.375 (-)	38.375 (-)	152.423*
DQ	Ling Jie	9.281	9.787	9.725	9.625	152.423*
DQ	Liu Xuan	9.325	9.775	9.725	9.450	152.423*
DQ	Dong Fangxiao*	9.087	9.550	9.575	9.775	152.423*
DQ	Huang Mandan	9.081	9.787	9.350	9.525	152.423*
DQ	Bai Chunyue	9.037	9.550	8.925	9.325	152.423*
DQ	Xu Jing					152.423*

- China originally finished third, but it was discovered in 2008 that Chinese officials falsified the age of team member Dong Fangxiao; the team were officially disqualified in March 2012, with the bronze medals awarded to Ukraine, and Dong's results from this competition and the 2000 Olympics were struck from the records. Previously, in 2010, China's 2000 Olympic bronze medals had been awarded to the US team.

=== All Around Final ===
Rank	Gymnast	Vault (gymnastics)	Uneven bars	Balance beam	Floor (gymnastics)	Total
1st place, gold medalist(s)	Maria Olaru (ROU)	9.625	9.587	9.737	9.825	38.774
2nd place, silver medalist(s)	Viktoria Karpenko (UKR)	9.493	9.775	9.762	9.675	38.705
3rd place, bronze medalist(s)	Elena Zamolodchikova (RUS)	9.650	9.650	9.600	9.787	38.687
4	Elena Produnova (RUS)	9.349	9.750	9.762	9.812	38.673
5	Andreea Răducan (ROU)	9.418	9.612	9.750	9.837	38.617
6	Huang Mandan (CHN)	8.843	9.800	9.600	9.775	38.018
7	Elise Ray (USA)	9.343	9.637	9.375	9.662	38.017
8	Allana Slater (AUS)	9.206	9.637	9.562	9.400	37.805
9	Sara Moro (ESP)	9.274	9.437	9.412	9.662	37.785
10	Esther Moya (ESP)	9.400	9.550	9.212	9.487	37.649
11	Svetlana Khorkina (RUS)	9.187	9.762	8.937	9.725	37.611
12	Olga Roschupkina (UKR)	9.174	9.612	9.412	9.287	37.485
13	Monica Bergamelli (ITA)	9.250	9.462	9.150	9.437	37.299
13	Simona Amânar (ROU)	9.625	8.175	9.687	9.812	37.299
15	Lisa Skinner (AUS)	9.331	8.925	9.487	9.550	37.293
16	Bai Chunyue (CHN)	8.600	9.675	9.475	9.375	37.125
17	Risa Sugawara (JPN)	9.000	9.062	9.400	9.487	36.949
18	Kate Richardson (CAN)	9.024	9.487	8.787	9.562	36.860
19	Laura Martínez (ESP)	9.275	9.500	8.775	9.187	36.737
20	Martina Bremini (ITA)	9.262	9.437	8.562	9.450	36.711
21	Natalia Horodny (UKR)	9.281	9.637	8.812	8.975	36.705
22	Yvonne Tousek (CAN)	9.093	9.325	8.987	9.275	36.680
23	Birgit Schweigert (GER)	9.031	9.375	9.425	8.787	36.618
24	Trudy McIntosh (AUS)	9.556	8.600	8.912	9.512	36.580
25	Lisa Mason (GBR)	9.318	8.975	8.700	9.562	36.555
26	Daniele Hypólito (BRA)	8.949	9.325	9.387	8.875	36.536
27	Miho Takenaka (JPN)	9.174	9.312	8.525	9.512	36.523
28	Alexandra Soler (FRA)	9.050	8.975	9.075	9.412	36.512
29	Inna Poklonskaya (BLR)	9.331	7.537	9.537	9.350	35.755
30	Vanessa Atler (USA)	9.556	8.775	9.500	7.900	35.731
31	Monique Nuijten (NED)	9.281	8.312	8.975	9.050	35.618
32	Jana Komrsková (CZE)	9.368	9.087	7.812	9.287	35.554
33	Nelly Ramassamy (FRA)	8.875	8.812	8.912	8.850	35.449
34	Alena Polozkova (BLR)	9.062	7.962	8.675	9.262	34.961
35	Irina Yevdokimova (KAZ)	8.787	8.150	8.262	9.125	34.324
DQ	Dong Fangxiao (CHN)*	9.331	9.550	9.525	9.737	38.143*

=== Vault Final ===
Rank	Gymnast	Total
1st place, gold medalist(s)	Elena Zamolodchikova (RUS)	9.718
2nd place, silver medalist(s)	Simona Amânar (ROU)	9.631
3rd place, bronze medalist(s)	Maria Olaru (ROU)	9.593
4	Elena Produnova (RUS)	9.587
5	Trudy McIntosh (AUS)	9.568
6	Denisse López (MEX)	9.562
7	Viktoria Karpenko (UKR)	9.475
8	Laura Martínez (ESP)	8.606

=== Uneven Bars ===
Rank	Gymnast	Total
1st place, gold medalist(s)	Svetlana Khorkina (RUS)	9.837
2nd place, silver medalist(s)	Huang Mandan (CHN)	9.825
3rd place, bronze medalist(s)	Ling Jie (CHN)	9.812
4	Elena Produnova (RUS)	9.750
5	Viktoria Karpenko (UKR)	9.725
6	Maria Olaru (ROU)	9.712
7	Elise Ray (USA)	9.687
8	Tatiana Zharganova (BLR)	9.612

=== Balance Beam ===
Rank	Gymnast	Total
1st place, gold medalist(s)	Ling Jie (CHN)	9.775
2nd place, silver medalist(s)	Andreea Răducan (ROU)	9.762
3rd place, bronze medalist(s)	Olga Roschupkina (UKR)	9.737
4	Maria Olaru (ROU)	9.650
5	Olga Teslenko (UKR)	9.587
6	Anna Kovaleva (RUS)	9.500
7	Laura Martínez (ESP)	9.425
DQ	Dong Fangxiao (CHN)*	9.462*

=== Floor Exercise ===
Rank	Gymnast	Total
1st place, gold medalist(s)	Andreea Răducan (ROU)	9.837
2nd place, silver medalist(s)	Simona Amânar (ROU)	9.800
3rd place, bronze medalist(s)	Svetlana Khorkina (RUS)	9.787
4	Elena Produnova (RUS)	9.737
5	Ludivine Furnon (FRA)	9.612
6	Tatiana Yarosh (UKR)	9.600
7	Yvonne Tousek (CAN)	9.537
DQ	Dong Fangxiao (CHN)*	9.737*
