= Sigrid Persoon =

Belgian gymnast (born 1983)

Personal information
- Nationality: Belgian
- Born: 12 March 1983 (age 42); Dendermonde, Belgium

Sport
- Sport: Gymnastics

Sigrid Persoon (born 12 March 1983) is a Belgian former gymnast. She competed at the 2000 Summer Olympics.
