= Simona Amânar =

Romanian gymnast (born 1979)

- Full name: Simona Amânar
- Nickname: Simi
- Born: 7 October 1979 (age 46) Constanța, Romania
- Height: 158 cm (5 ft 2 in)

Gymnastics career
- Discipline: Women's artistic gymnastics
- Country represented: Romania; (1994–2000 (ROM))
- Gym: Deva National Training Center
- Head coach: Octavian Bellu
- Assistant coach: Mariana Bitang
- Eponymous skills: Amanar (vault)
- Retired: 2000
Medal record
Representing Romania
Olympic Games
Gold medal – first place	1996 Atlanta	Vault
Gold medal – first place	2000 Sydney	Team
Gold medal – first place	2000 Sydney	All-Around
Silver medal – second place	1996 Atlanta	Floor Exercise
Bronze medal – third place	1996 Atlanta	Team
Bronze medal – third place	1996 Atlanta	All-Around
Bronze medal – third place	2000 Sydney	Floor Exercise
World Championships
Gold medal – first place	1994 Dortmund	Team
Gold medal – first place	1995 Sabae	Team
Gold medal – first place	1995 Sabae	Vault
Gold medal – first place	1997 Lausanne	Team
Gold medal – first place	1997 Lausanne	Vault
Gold medal – first place	1999 Tianjin	Team
Silver medal – second place	1996 San Juan	Vault
Silver medal – second place	1997 Lausanne	All-Around
Silver medal – second place	1999 Tianjin	Vault
Silver medal – second place	1999 Tianjin	Floor Exercise
World Cup Final
Gold medal – first place	1998 Sabae	Vault
Gold medal – first place	1998 Sabae	Floor Exercise
Silver medal – second place	2000 Glasgow	Vault
Silver medal – second place	2000 Glasgow	Balance Beam
Bronze medal – third place	2000 Glasgow	Floor Exercise
Goodwill Games
Silver medal – second place	1998 New York	Floor Exercise
Bronze medal – third place	1998 New York	All Around
Bronze medal – third place	1998 New York	Vault
Bronze medal – third place	1998 New York	Uneven Bars
European Championships
Gold medal – first place	1994 Stockholm	Team
Gold medal – first place	1996 Birmingham	Team
Gold medal – first place	1996 Birmingham	Vault
Gold medal – first place	1996 Birmingham	Uneven Bars
Gold medal – first place	1998 St. Petersburg	Team
Gold medal – first place	2000 Paris	Vault
Silver medal – second place	1998 St. Petersburg	All-Around
Silver medal – second place	1998 St. Petersburg	Vault
Silver medal – second place	2000 Paris	Balance Beam
Bronze medal – third place	1998 St. Petersburg	Balance Beam
Bronze medal – third place	1998 St. Petersburg	Floor Exercise
Bronze medal – third place	2000 Paris	Team

Simona Amânar (Romanian pronunciation: [siˈmona amɨˈnar]; born 7 October 1979) is a Romanian former artistic gymnast. She is the 2000 Olympic all-around champion, and a seven-time Olympic and ten-time World Championship medalist. Amânar helped Romania win four consecutive world team titles (1994–1999), as well as the 2000 Olympic team title. She has a vault named after her, one of the most difficult in women's gymnastics, and was inducted into the International Gymnastics Hall of Fame in 2007.

== Biography ==
Simona Amânar is an ethnic Aromanian.

== Career ==
=== 1994–1995 ===
In 1994, her first year on the senior national team, Amânar contributed to Romania's team titles at the World and European Championships.

Amânar began to excel as an individual performer at the 1995 European Cup, placing second in the all-around behind Svetlana Khorkina of Russia and winning gold on both vault and floor exercise. At the 1995 World Championships, she helped Romania secure its second consecutive world team title and became co-champion on vault (with all-around winner Lilia Podkopayeva of Ukraine). Amânar's powerful floor routine and vaults put her in the lead after two rotations in the all-around, but she dropped to fourth after an average uneven bars routine and a shaky balance beam routine.

=== 1996 ===
Amânar won a silver medal on vault at the 1996 World Championships, behind teammate Gina Gogean and ahead of Cuba's Annia Portuondo-Hatch.

At the 1996 Summer Olympics, Amânar was one of the front-runners for several individual medals, but her Olympics started inauspiciously when she fell off the beam during the compulsories. Though she later posted the highest all-around score in the optionals (39.387, her lowest score being a 9.800 on the balance beam), her combined compulsory and optionals scores put her fourth among her teammates, and she did not qualify for the final. However, in a scenario similar to the Unified Team's substitution of Tatiana Gutsu for Rozalia Galiyeva at the 1992 Olympics, Amânar replaced her teammate Alexandra Marinescu in the all-around final. The Romanian head coach, Octavian Bellu, said that Amânar deserved to compete because she had worked harder and was a better athlete than Marinescu. Amânar ended up sharing the bronze medal with teammate Lavinia Miloşovici, behind Gogean.

In both the 1996 Olympic all-around and the 1995 World Championships all-around, Amânar failed to score over 9.800 on the floor exercise despite well-executed and difficult tumbling. In the Olympics, she scored a 9.887 in the team optionals (the highest score of the entire Olympics on any event, for men or women), but only a 9.737 in the all-around. She did not start from a 10.0 in the all-around—despite having the most tumbling bonus points of anyone at the Games—because her tour jeté half-turn (Strug), a C element, was not completed. Thus, she did not have enough simple A, B, and C skills, and much of her D- and E-rated tumbling had to count as easier elements to fulfill those requirements. Amânar did not perform a double turn in the team optionals or the all-around because it was not necessary as long as she completed her Strug. However, when she failed to complete the Strug, four of her six tenths in D and E elements had to count toward requirements, which left her with only .2 counting toward her bonus. Without the error, Amânar would have finished ahead of Gogean and Miloşovici.

In the event finals, Amânar completed her Strug and added a double turn to fulfill the more stringent Competition III requirements. She earned a 9.850 and the silver medal, behind Podkopayeva and just ahead of Dominique Dawes of the United States. She won the vault final the day before, largely because of her 9.875 score for her double-twisting Yurchenko vault. She left the 1996 Olympics with four medals, including Romania's team bronze.

=== 1997–1999 ===
Romania won its third straight team title at the 1997 World Championships. Amânar again replaced a higher-scoring Marinescu in the all-around competition and won the silver medal behind Russia's Khorkina, followed by a gold medal on vault.

In the 1999 World Championships, Amânar led the Romanian team to a fourth consecutive title (there was no Worlds competition in 1998). However, she fell off the bars during the all-around and placed well out of the medals. She also lost her vaulting title to Russia's Elena Zamolodchikova, who dominated that event in the following years due to a more difficult second vault: a double-twisting Tsukahara. Amânar won her only medal of the competition on the floor, taking home the silver behind teammate Andreea Răducan.

=== 2000 ===
At the 2000 Summer Olympics, the Romanians edged out the Russians to take the team title—their first since 1984 and their first ever in a non-boycotted Olympics.

In the all-around, the vaulting horse was set too low by the Olympic organizers, and the favorite for the title, Svetlana Khorkina, fell on her signature vault. Several other gymnasts fell or stumbled because of the same problem. Many went on to make mistakes on their next event, knowing their medal chances were gone, only to be informed later of the error and their chance to vault again. The three Romanian women either managed to perform well on the faulty vault or vaulted after the mistake had been corrected. They swept the medals, with Răducan winning the gold, Amânar the silver, and Maria Olaru the bronze.

Răducan was subsequently found to have used a cold medicine containing a banned substance. Although her results in other events were allowed to stand, she was stripped of her all-around gold medal, which went to Amânar. Initially, Amânar refused to accept the medal, insisting that Răducan had rightfully earned the title. Olaru took the same stance when the silver was awarded to her. However, they eventually reconsidered and decided to bring the medals home to Romania as symbolic victories of the country. Amânar continued to insist, however, that Răducan was the true Olympic all-around champion.

In the event finals, Amânar had the opportunity to defend her Olympic vault title from four years earlier. However, she stumbled badly while debuting a new vault (a 2 1/2 twisting laid-out Yurchenko, which was then named after her), and did not win a medal. She went on to win bronze on floor exercise after losing points for a step out of bounds on her last tumbling pass.

== Legacy ==
Amânar ranks highly (117th) on the list of most medal gymnasts in the world, with 10 World and 7 Olympic medals. She played a large role in the four consecutive World team titles and Olympic title that established Romania as the top-ranked women's gymnastics team in the world.

The Amanar vault involves a round-off entry onto the vaulting table followed by a laid-out salto with 2 1/2 twists. Amânar first competed this skill at the 2000 Olympics. It has a difficulty score of 6.5, 6.3 and 5.8 in the women's 2009–2012, 2013–2016 and 2017–2020 Code of Points.

== Post-retirement ==
Amânar retired in 2000, shortly after the Olympic Games. She married Cosmin Tabără, a lawyer, on 9 March 2002, in Timișoara, and gave birth to a son, Alexandru Iosif, five months later. She is the vice president of the Romanian Gymnastics Federation.

== Eponymous skill ==
Amânar has one eponymous skill in the Code of Points, the Amanar vault.

Apparatus	Name	Description	Difficulty (Note: Valid for the 2025-2028 Code of Points)
Vault	Amanar	Round-off flic-flac on - stretched salto backward with 2½ turn (900°) off	5.4

== Competitive history ==
Year	Event	AA	Team	VT	UB	BB	FX
1993	China Cup	3rd					
1993	Romanian Nationals	5th		2nd			3rd
1994	American Cup	9th					
1994	European Championships		1st				
1994	GBR-ROM Dual Meet	3rd	1st				
1994	International Mixed Pairs		6th				
1994	Massilia Elite	5th	2nd				
1994	USA-ROM Dual Meet	7th	1st				
1994	Team World Championships		1st				
1995	European Cup	2nd		1st	5th	3rd	1st
1995	FRA-ROM Dual Meet	2nd	1st				
1995	French International	3rd				3rd	5th
1995	GBR-ROM Dual Meet	3rd	1st				
1995	Kosice Cup	2nd				2nd	2nd
1995	ROM-GER Dual Meet	3rd	1st				
1995	Romanian Nationals	2nd					
1995	World Championships	4th	1st	1st			6th
1996	European Championships	4th	1st	1st	1st	5th	7th
1996	French International			3rd	5th		
1996	Hungarian International	1st					
1996	ITA-BLR-ROM-RUS Meet	2nd					
1996	International Championships of Romania	1st					
1996	World Championships			2nd			
1996	Olympic Games	3rd	3rd	1st	5th		2nd
1997
1997	World Championships	2nd	1st	1st			
1997	Chunichi Cup	2nd					
1997	Blume Memorial	2nd					
1997	DTB Cup			1st		6th	3rd
1997	Arthur Gander Memorial	1st					
1998	European Championships	2nd	1st	2nd			
1998	Chunichi Cup	6th					
1998	DTB Cup			1st	2nd	1st	2nd
1998	Romanian International	1st		2nd		1st	1st
1998	Swiss Cup			3rd	2nd	2nd	3rd
1999
1999	World Championships	14th	1st	2nd			2nd
1999	Chunichi Cup	2nd					
1999	Arthur Gander Memorial	2nd					
1999	Romanian International	1st		1st	2nd	1st	1st
1999	International Mixed Pairs	1st	1st				
2000	European Championships	8th	3rd	1st		2nd	5th
2000	Olympic Games	1st	1st	6th			3rd
2000	Chunichi Cup	1st					
2000	Cottbus World Cup			2nd		7th	2nd
2000	Romanian International	2nd					
2000	National Championships	1st					

== See also ==
- List of Olympic female gymnasts for Romania
- List of Olympic medal leaders in women's gymnastics
- List of top female medalists at the World Artistic Gymnastics Championships
