= Tetiana Yarosh =

Ukrainian gymnast (born 1984)

- Born: 1 September 1984 (age 42) Kirovohrad, Ukrainian SSR, Soviet Union
- Height: 140 cm (4 ft 7 in)

Gymnastics career
- Discipline: Women's artistic gymnastics
- Country represented: Ukraine
- Club: Dynamo Kirvohrad
Medal record
Women's artistic gymnastics
Representing Ukraine
World Championships
| Bronze medal – third place | 1999 Tianjin | Team |
European Championships
| Silver medal – second place | 2000 Paris | Team |
Junior European Championships
| Gold medal – first place | 1998 Saint Petersburg | Team |
| Gold medal – first place | 1998 Saint Petersburg | Uneven Bars |
| Gold medal – first place | 1998 Saint Petersburg | Floor Exercise |

Tetiana Yarosh (born 1 September 1984) is a Ukrainian gymnast. She finished fifth in the balance beam final at the 2000 Summer Olympics.

== See also ==
- List of Olympic female artistic gymnasts for Ukraine
