= Lisa Skinner =

Australian artistic gymnast

- Full name: Lisa Maree Skinner
- Born: 17 February 1981 (age 45) Clear Mountain, Queensland

Gymnastics career
- Discipline: Women's artistic gymnastics
- Country represented: Australia
- Club: Queensland Academy of Sport
- Former coaches: Vladimir Zakharov; Stacey Umeh-Lees
- Retired: 2000; 2004
Medal record
Representing Australia
Commonwealth Games
Gold medal – first place	1998 Kuala Lumpur	Team
Gold medal – first place	1998 Kuala Lumpur	Uneven bars

Lisa Maree Skinner (born 17 February 1981 Brisbane and lived in Clear Mountain, Brisbane, Australia) is an Australian artistic gymnast who competed at the 1996, 2000 and 2004 Olympic Games. She was the first Australian gymnast to qualify for an individual event final at the Olympics. She has toured with Cirque du Soleil performing aerial hoops.

== Gymnastic career ==
Skinner began gymnastics in 1987 at Lawnton Academy. Between 1995 and 2004, she was a consistent presence on the Australian team, competing at four World Championships, three Olympic Games and many other international meets. She was the Australian national champion in 1996 and 1997.

Skinner made her senior international debut at the 1995 World Championships in Sabae, placing 12th with the Australian team. The next year, at the 1996 Summer Olympics, she helped Australia place 10th in the team finals and finished 36th in the individual all-around.

In the following years, Skinner's international performance improved dramatically. She earned two gold medals at the 1998 Commonwealth Games: one with the Australian team, the other as an individual on the uneven bars. At the 1999 World Championships, she placed 15th in the all-around.

At the 2000 Summer Olympics in Sydney, Skinner was the highest-ranked Australian female gymnast. At one point in the all-around competition, she was in third place. However, her vault had a low start value, and she therefore did not score high enough to win a medal. She eventually finished in 8th place, the highest placement ever for an Australian gymnast. In the floor exercise final, she had another chance to earn a medal, but ended up in 8th place after a fall. Her appearance was still notable, because it was the first time that an Australian gymnast had qualified to an Olympic event final. The score she received for the same routine in the all-around, a 9.75, would have been enough for a bronze medal in the final.

After the 2000 Olympics, Skinner retired, but in 2002 she decided to resume training. She returned to competition in 2003, representing Australia at the 2003 World Artistic Gymnastics Championships, the 2004 Pacific Alliance Championships, and the 2004 Summer Olympics. At her third Olympics, Skinner was an uneven bars and balance beam specialist.

As a gymnast, Skinner was known for her expressive, balletic presentation and clean lines. She was a floor exercise specialist for many years, displaying routines with unique choreography and music. She also designed several leotards worn by the Australian national team at major competitions.

Following the 2004 Olympics, Skinner retired again.

== Cirque du Soleil ==
Skinner later began working with Cirque du Soleil with their production Alegría as a power-track artist and dance captain for the show in April 2006. After that, she joined another Cirque show, Quidam in 2010 as the backup for the character 'Target' as well as performing aerial hoop trio until the show closed in February 2016. Most recently, following the closure of Quidam, Skinner has begun performing solo Aerial Hoop with their touring show Koozå, joining its tour in her home state, Queensland, from 24 November 2016. However just 3 days later she suffered a neck fracture and broken arm during a Koozå performance in Brisbane.

== See also ==
- List of Olympic female gymnasts for Australia
