= Brooke Walker (gymnast) =

Australian artistic gymnast

Personal information
- Nationality: Australian
- Born: 26 February 1982 (age 43) Frankston, Victoria, Australia

Sport
- Sport: Gymnastics

Brooke Moffat (née Walker; born 26 February 1982) is an Australian gymnast. She competed at the 2000 Summer Olympics.
