= Laura Martínez Ruiz =

Spanish artistic gymnast

Laura Martínez Ruiz (born August 1, 1984 in Barcelona, Spain) is a Spanish female artistic gymnast who competed at the 1999 World Artistic Gymnastics Championships and the 2000 Summer Olympics.
