= Marina Zarzhitskaya =

Belarusian artistic gymnast (born 1981)

Marina Aleksandrovna Zarzhitskaya (born 20 December 1981) is a Belarusian former artistic gymnast. She competed at the 2000 Summer Olympics.
