= Irene Castelli =

Italian gymnast

Personal information
- Nationality: Italian
- Born: 4 November 1983 (age 41); Ponte San Pietro, Italy

Sport
- Sport: Gymnastics

Irene Castelli (born 4 November 1983) is an Italian former gymnast. She competed at the 2000 Summer Olympics.
