= Delphine Regease =

French artistic gymnast

Personal information
- Nationality: French
- Born: 20 February 1984 (age 42)

Sport
- Sport: Gymnastics
Medal record
Representing France
Women's artistic gymnastics
Mediterranean Games
Bronze medal – third place	2001 Tunis	Team

Delphine Regease (born 20 February 1984) is a French former artistic gymnast. She competed at the 2000 Summer Olympics.
