= Emma Williams (gymnast) =

British artistic gymnast (born 1983)

- Full name: Emma Louise Williams
- Born: 9 July 1983 (age 43) Liverpool, England
- Height: 154 cm (5 ft 1 in)

Gymnastics career
- Discipline: Women's artistic gymnastics
- Country represented: United Kingdom

Emma Louise Williams (born 9 July 1983 in Liverpool) is a British artistic gymnast that competed at the 2000 Summer Olympics.
