= Mojca Mavrič =

Slovenian gymnast (born 1980)

Personal information
- Nationality: Slovenian
- Born: 8 October 1980 (age 45) Ljubljana, Yugoslavia

Sport
- Sport: Gymnastics

Mojca Mavrič (born 8 October 1980) is a Slovenian gymnast. She competed at the 2000 Summer Olympics.
