= Halina Tyryk =

Ukrainian gymnast (born 1980)

- Born: 30 March 1980 (age 46) Lviv, Ukrainian SSR, Soviet Union
- Height: 158 cm (5 ft 2 in)

Gymnastics career
- Discipline: Women's artistic gymnastics
- Country represented: Ukraine
Medal record
Women's artistic gymnastics
Representing Ukraine
European Championships
Bronze medal – third place	1998 Saint Petersburg	Team
Summer Universiade
Silver medal – second place	1999 Mallorca	Team
Bronze medal – third place	1999 Mallorca	Floor exercise

Halina Tyryk (born 30 March 1980) is a Ukrainian gymnast. She finished twenty-second in the all around at the 2000 Summer Olympics.

== See also ==
- List of Olympic female artistic gymnasts for Ukraine
