= Nelly Ramassamy =

French artistic gymnast

- Born: December 4, 1983 (age 42) Ajaccio, France

Gymnastics career
- Discipline: Women's artistic gymnastics
- Country represented: France (1998-2004 (?))

Nelly Ramassamy (born 4 December 1983) is a French female artistic gymnast, representing her nation at international competitions.

She participated at the 2000 Summer Olympics. She also competed at world championships, including the 1999 World Artistic Gymnastics Championships, and 2003 World Artistic Gymnastics Championships.
