= Alexandra Soler =

French artistic gymnast

Alexandra Soler (born 14 October 1983 in Béziers) is a French former artistic gymnast. She competed at the 2000 Summer Olympics.
