= Claudia Presăcan =

Romanian artistic gymnast

- Full name: Claudia Maria Presăcan
- Born: 28 December 1979 (age 46) Sibiu, Romania

Gymnastics career
- Discipline: Women's artistic gymnastics
- Country represented: Romania (1993–2000 (ROM))
- Gym: Deva national training center
- Head coach: Octavian Bellu
- Assistant coach: Mariana Bitang
- Retired: 2000
Medal record
Women's Artistic Gymnastics
Representing Romania
Olympic Games
Gold medal – first place	2000 Sydney	Team
World Championships
Gold medal – first place	1994 Dortmund	Team
Gold medal – first place	1995 Sabae	Team
Gold medal – first place	1997 Lausanne	Team
European Championships
Gold medal – first place	1998 St. Petersburg	Team
Bronze medal – third place	1998 St. Petersburg	All-around
Bronze medal – third place	1998 St. Petersburg	Uneven bars

Claudia Maria Presăcan (born 28 December 1979 in Sibiu) is a Romanian artistic gymnast who competed at the senior international level between 1994 and 2000. She was a three-time team gold medalist at the World Championships with the Romanian team and was also a member of the gold medal-winning Romanian squad at the 2000 Olympics in Sydney.

== Early career ==
Presăcan was born in Sibiu and began gymnastics when she was 4½ years old. She moved to the junior Romanian national training center in Bucharest in 1993 and began competing internationally the same year, placing third overall and winning two silver medals at the Top Gym junior tournament in Charleroi, Belgium. In 1994 she participated in the Junior European Championships, where she won a gold medal on floor exercise.

== Senior career ==
Presăcan moved into senior competition later in 1994, participating in the 1994 Team World Championships with the Romanian team and contributing to their gold medal performance. She was also a member of the first-place Romanian team the following year at the 1995 World Championships in Sabae. However, she missed the 1996 Olympics due to a broken hand.

Presăcan returned to competition in 1997, winning her third World Championships medal with the Romanian team at that year's World Championships in Lausanne. Injuries kept her from the 1999 team, but she recovered in time to earn a place on the Romanian squad at the 2000 Olympics. She contributed to the team's gold medal and qualified for the balance beam event final, where she placed fourth, just out of the medals.

After the conclusion of the Games, it was revealed that Presăcan had competed with a severe case of anemia. Despite having a hemoglobin level of 6.3, she had been cleared to compete by team physician Ioachim Oana.

== Post-retirement ==
After Presăcan retired from gymnastics in late 2000, she had a brief career in rowing, serving as a coxswain for the Romanian rowing team at the 2001 University Games.

In 2002, Presăcan, along with former teammates Corina Ungureanu and Lavinia Miloșovici, sparked controversy by posing naked in photographs for a Japanese photobook, LCC Gold ISBN 4-87279-118-5, and performing gymnastics routines topless for the Japanese DVDs Gold Bird and Euro Angels. A number of photographs from the photobook and DVDs were subsequently published in the Japanese magazine Shūkan Gendai, and an edited version of the DVDs entitled 3 Gold Girls was released in Germany in 2004. Because the gymnasts had posed for some of the photographs and footage wearing their official Romanian team leotards, the Romanian Gymnastics Federation banned them from coaching and judging in the country for five years, and the Japanese Junior Gymnastic Club Federation contemplated banning Romanian gymnasts from a major international junior competition.

Presăcan is currently working as a coach on the Isle of Man.

== Major results ==
- 1994 Junior Europeans: 7th AA, 4th V, 1st FX
- 1994 World Team Championships: 1st team
- 1995 World Championships: 1st team
- 1997 International Team Championships: 1st team
- 1997 Romanian National Championships: 1st AA, 1st UB, 3rd BB, 2nd FX
- 1997 World Championships: 1st team, 8th AA, 5th UB, 6th FX
- 1998 Women's Artistic Championships: 2nd team
- 1998 International Team Championships: 2nd team
- 1998 European Championships: 1st Team, 3rd AA, 3rd UB
- 1998 Romanian National Championships: 1st BB
- 1999 International Team Championships: 1st team
- 2000 Romanian National Championships: 5th AA, 2nd BB
- 2000 Olympic Games: 1st T, 4th BB

Key: AA: all-around; BB: balance beam; FX: floor exercise; UB: uneven bars; VT: vault
