= Andreea Isărescu =

Romanian artistic gymnast

- Full name: Florenţa Andreea Isărescu
- Born: 3 July 1984 (age 42) Bucharest, Romania

Gymnastics career
- Discipline: Women's artistic gymnastics
- Country represented: Romania
- Club: CSS Oneşti
- Head coach: Octavian Belu
- Assistant coach: Mariana Bitang
Medal record
Olympic Games
Gold medal – first place	2000 Sydney	Team
World Championships
Gold medal – first place	1999 Tianjin	Team

Florenţa Andreea Isărescu (born 3 July 1984) is a Romanian artistic gymnast who competed in international events between 1997 and 2000. She is an Olympic gold medalist and a world gold medalist with the team.
