= Russia women's national artistic gymnastics team =

Russia
- Continental union: European Union of Gymnastics
- National federation: Artistic Gymnastics Federation of Russia

Olympic Games
- Appearances: 6
- Medals: Gold: 2020; Silver: 1996, 2000, 2012, 2016; Bronze: 2004

World Championships
- Appearances: 11
- Medals: Gold: 2010; Silver: 1997, 1999, 2001, 2011, 2018, 2019; Bronze: 1994, 2006, 2014

Junior World Championships
- Appearances: 1
- Medals: Gold: 2019

The Russia women's national artistic gymnastics team represents Russia in FIG international competitions. Additionally, they have competed as the Russian Olympic Committee (ROC) and the Russian Gymnastics Federation (RGF) due to the World Anti-Doping Agency imposing sanctions on Russia in the aftermath of the doping scandal and as Individual Neutral Athletes (AIN) due to the ban on Russian athletes after the 2022 Russian invasion of Ukraine.

While competing under the Russian Olympic Committee designation, they won the gold medal at the 2020 Olympic Games. They also won the team gold medal at the 2010 World Championships and at the inaugural Junior World Championships in 2019.

== History ==
At the Olympic Games, Russia has made seven appearances in the women's team competition and won six medals, including a gold in 2020. Russia has also won ten medals in the World Artistic Gymnastics Championships women's team competition.

After the 2022 Russian invasion of Ukraine, the International Gymnastics Federation (FIG) barred Russian athletes and officials, including judges. It also announced that "all FIG World Cup and World Challenge Cup events planned to take place in Russia ... are cancelled, and no other FIG events will be allocated to Russia ... until further notice." FIG also banned the Russian flag and anthem at its events. European Gymnastics announced in March 2022 that no athletes, officials, and judges from the Russian Gymnastics Federation can participate in any European Gymnastics events, that no European Gymnastics authorities from Russias can pursue their functions, and that European Gymnastics had removed from its calendar all events allocated to Russia and would not allocate any future events to Russia.

Starting in 2025, Russian gymnasts started applying for Individual Neutral Athlete status. If granted, they were permitted to compete internationally as an individual. In May 2026, World Gymnastics lifted all restrictions against Russian athletes. Despite the ban being lifted, local governments were still allowed to refuse to display Russian flags and national emblems during competitions allocated before the ban was lifted. Therefore, Russia still sometimes competed under the banner World Gymnastics 2.

== Current senior roster ==
Name	Birthdate and age	District represented	AIN status
Maria Agafonova	3 October 2005 (age 21)	Northwestern Federal District	check
Ekaterina Andreeva	23 January 2008 (age 18)	Volga Federal District	check
Anastasia Bedrina		Northwestern Federal District	check
Varvara Belova	4 June 2010 (age 16)	Central Federal District	
Diana Gainulina	11 October 2010 (age 16)	Southern Federal District	check
Milana Kaiumova	26 September 2010 (age 16)	Saint Petersburg	check
Anna Kalmykova	22 August 2008 (age 18)	Moscow	check
Viktoria Listunova	2 May 2005 (age 21)	Moscow	
Angelina Melnikova (captain)	18 July 2000 (age 26)	Central Federal District	check
Lyudmila Roshchina	24 January 2008 (age 18)	Northwestern Federal District	check
Kristina Shapovalova	15 August 2008 (age 18)	Central Federal District	
Elizaveta Us	11 January 2007 (age 19)	Southern Federal District	check
Leila Vasilieva	9 December 2007 (age 18)	Central Federal District	check
Ksenia Zelyaeva	21 October 2009 (age 17)	Central Federal District	check

== Team competition results ==
Names in italics denote alternates who received a medal.

=== Olympic Games ===
Year	Position	Squad
1952 through 1992 — participated as the Soviet Union
1996	Silver medal	Elena Dolgopolova, Rozalia Galiyeva, Elena Grosheva, Svetlana Khorkina, Dina Kochetkova, Yevgeniya Kuznetsova, Oksana Lyapina
2000	Silver medal	Anna Chepeleva, Svetlana Khorkina, Anastasiya Kolesnikova, Yekaterina Lobaznyuk, Yelena Produnova, Elena Zamolodchikova
2004	Bronze medal	Ludmila Ezhova, Svetlana Khorkina, Maria Kryuchkova, Anna Pavlova, Elena Zamolodchikova, Natalia Ziganshina
2008	4th place	Ksenia Afanasyeva, Svetlana Klyukina, Ekaterina Kramarenko, Anna Pavlova, Ludmila Grebenkova, Ksenia Semyonova
2012	Silver medal	Ksenia Afanasyeva, Anastasia Grishina, Viktoria Komova, Aliya Mustafina, Maria Paseka
2016	Silver medal	Angelina Melnikova, Aliya Mustafina, Maria Paseka, Daria Spiridonova, Seda Tutkhalyan
2020	Gold medal	Lilia Akhaimova, Viktoria Listunova, Angelina Melnikova, Vladislava Urazova participated as the Russian Olympic Committee
2024	banned from participating as a team	

=== World Championships ===
Year	Position	Squad
1954 through 1991 — participated as the Soviet Union
1994	Bronze medal	Oxana Fabrichnova, Elena Grosheva, Natalia Ivanova, Svetlana Khorkina, Dina Kochetkova, Elena Lebedeva, Evgenia Roschina
1995	4th place	Natalia Bobrova, Elena Dolgopolova, Elena Grosheva, Svetlana Khorkina, Dina Kochetkova, Yevgeniya Kuznetsova, Yelena Produnova
1997	Silver medal	Svetlana Bakhtina, Elena Dolgopolova, Elena Grosheva, Svetlana Khorkina, Yevgeniya Kuznetsova, Yelena Produnova
1999	Silver medal	Svetlana Khorkina, Anna Kovalyova, Yevgeniya Kuznetsova, Yekaterina Lobaznyuk, Yelena Produnova, Elena Zamolodchikova
2001	Silver medal	Ludmila Ezhova, Svetlana Khorkina, Elena Zamolodchikova, Maria Zassypkina, Natalia Ziganshina
2003	6th place	Elena Anochina, Aleksandra Shevchenko, Ludmila Ezhova, Svetlana Khorkina, Anna Pavlova, Elena Zamolodchikova
2006	Bronze medal	Anna Grudko, Svetlana Klyukina, Polina Miller, Anna Pavlova, Kristina Pravdina, Elena Zamolodchikova
2007	8th place	Svetlana Klyukina, Ekaterina Kramarenko, Yulia Lozhechko, Kristina Pravdina, Ksenia Semyonova, Elena Zamolodchikova
2010	Gold medal	Ksenia Afanasyeva, Anna Dementyeva, Ekaterina Kurbatova, Aliya Mustafina, Tatiana Nabieva, Ksenia Semyonova
2011	Silver medal	Ksenia Afanasyeva, Yulia Belokobylskaya, Anna Dementyeva, Yulia Inshina, Viktoria Komova, Tatiana Nabieva
2014	Bronze medal	Polina Fedorova, Maria Kharenkova, Ekaterina Kramarenko, Aliya Mustafina, Tatiana Nabieva, Alla Sosnitskaya, Daria Spiridonova
2015	4th place	Ksenia Afanasyeva, Maria Kharenkova, Viktoria Komova, Maria Paseka, Daria Spiridonova, Seda Tutkhalyan
2018	Silver medal	Lilia Akhaimova, Irina Alexeeva, Angelina Melnikova, Aliya Mustafina, Angelina Simakova, Daria Spiridonova
2019	Silver medal	Anastasia Agafonova, Lilia Akhaimova, Angelina Melnikova, Aleksandra Shchekoldina, Daria Spiridonova, Maria Paseka
2022	banned from participating	
2023	banned from participating	
2026	6th place	Aleksandra Anufrieva, Alyona Glotova, Milana Kaiumova, Liudmila Roshchina, Elizaveta Us, Zlata Osokina (Note: Angelina Melnikova, Anna Kalmykova, and Viktoria Listunova were originally named to the team; however the Netherlands denied them visas.)

=== European Games ===
Year	Position	Squad
2015	Gold medal	Aliya Mustafina, Viktoria Komova, Seda Tutkhalyan

=== Junior World Championships ===
Year	Position	Squad
2019	Gold medal	Elena Gerasimova, Viktoria Listunova, Vladislava Urazova, Yana Vorona

== Most decorated gymnasts ==
This list includes all Russian female artistic gymnasts who have won at least four medals at the Olympic Games and the World Artistic Gymnastics Championships combined. Included are medals won while representing Russia, the Russian Olympic Committee, or the Russian Gymnastics Federation or competing as an Individual Neutral Athlete.

Rank	Gymnast	Years	Team	AA	VT	UB	BB	FX	Olympic Total	World Total	Total
1	Svetlana Khorkina	1994–2004	1996; 2000; 2004; 1997; 1999; 2001; 1994	2004; 1997; 2003; 1995	2001; 1994	1996; 2000; 1995; 1996; 1997; 1999; 2001; 1994	1997	2000; 1997; 1999; 2001	7	20	27
2	Aliya Mustafina	2010–2018	2012; 2016; 2010; 2018; 2014	2012; 2016; 2010; 2013	2010	2012; 2016; 2010; 2013	2013; 2014	2012; 2010; 2014	7	12	19
3	Angelina Melnikova	2016–2025	2020; 2016; 2018; 2019	2020; 2021; 2025; 2019	2025; 2021	2025		2020; 2021; 2019	4	10	14
4	Elena Zamolodchikova	1999–2006	2000; 2004; 1999; 2001; 2006	1999	2000; 1999; 2002; 2003			2000	4	7	11
5	Maria Paseka	2012–2019	2012; 2016; 2019		2016; 2012; 2015; 2017				4	3	7
6	Viktoria Komova	2011–2015	2012; 2011	2012; 2011		2011; 2015			2	4	6
7	Dina Kochetkova	1994–1996	1996; 1994	1994		1994	1996	1994	1	5	6
8	Daria Spiridonova	2014–2019	2016; 2018; 2019; 2014			2015; 2014			1	5	6
9	Yelena Produnova	1997–2000	2000; 1997; 1999	1997			2000	1997	2	4	6
10	Ksenia Afanasyeva	2010–2015	2012; 2010; 2011					2011; 2015	1	4	5
11	Ludmila Ezhova	2001–2004	2004; 2001			2002	2001; 2002		1	4	5
12	Tatiana Nabieva	2010–2014	2010; 2011; 2014			2011			0	4	4
13	Natalia Ziganshina	2001–2004	2004; 2001	2001	2002				1	3	4
14	Yekaterina Lobaznyuk	1999–2000	2000; 1999		2000		2000		3	1	4

== Best international results ==
Event	TF	AA	VT	UB	BB	FX
Olympic Games	1st place, gold medalist(s)	2nd place, silver medalist(s)	1st place, gold medalist(s)	1st place, gold medalist(s)	2nd place, silver medalist(s)	1st place, gold medalist(s)
World Championships	1st place, gold medalist(s)	1st place, gold medalist(s)	1st place, gold medalist(s)	1st place, gold medalist(s)	1st place, gold medalist(s)	1st place, gold medalist(s)
European Games	1st place, gold medalist(s)	1st place, gold medalist(s)	2nd place, silver medalist(s)	1st place, gold medalist(s)	2nd place, silver medalist(s)	2nd place, silver medalist(s)
European Championships	1st place, gold medalist(s)	1st place, gold medalist(s)	1st place, gold medalist(s)	1st place, gold medalist(s)	1st place, gold medalist(s)	1st place, gold medalist(s)
Youth Olympics	—N/a	1st place, gold medalist(s)	1st place, gold medalist(s)	1st place, gold medalist(s)	2nd place, silver medalist(s)	2nd place, silver medalist(s)
Junior World Championships	1st place, gold medalist(s)	1st place, gold medalist(s)	3rd place, bronze medalist(s)	1st place, gold medalist(s)	1st place, gold medalist(s)	1st place, gold medalist(s)
Universiade	1st place, gold medalist(s)	1st place, gold medalist(s)	1st place, gold medalist(s)	1st place, gold medalist(s)	2nd place, silver medalist(s)	1st place, gold medalist(s)

== See also ==
- Round Lake (gymnastics)
- Russia men's national gymnastics team
- Soviet Union women's national gymnastics team
- List of former Russian women's national gymnastics team rosters
- List of Olympic female artistic gymnasts for Russia
