= Elena Zamolodchikova =

Russian artistic gymnast

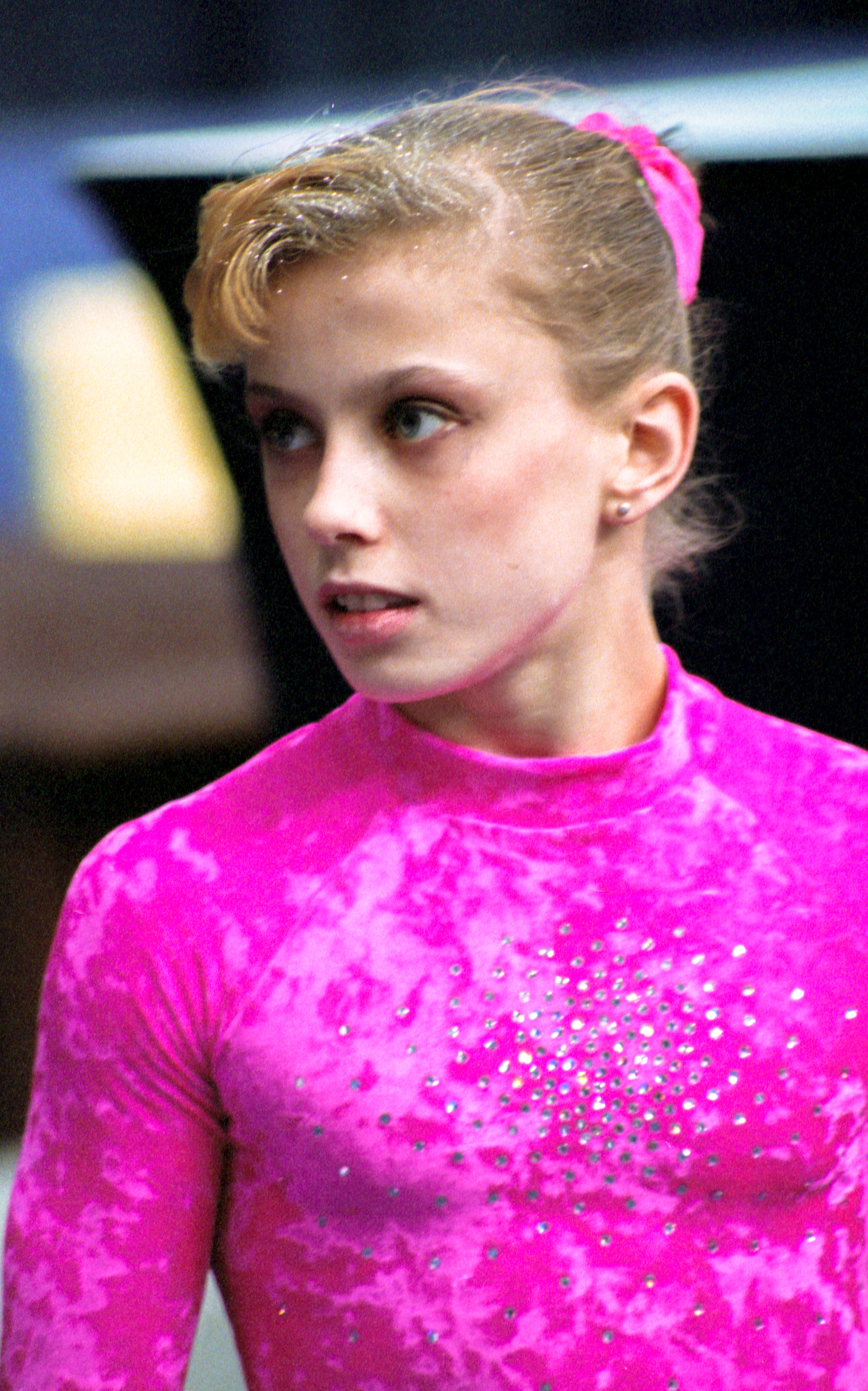
- Zamolodchikova in 1998

Personal information
- Full name: Elena Mikhailovna Zamolodchikova
- Alternative name: Yelena Zamolodchikova
- Nickname: Zamo
- Born: 19 September 1982 (age 44) Moscow, Russian SFSR, Soviet Union
- Height: 154 cm (5 ft 1 in)

Gymnastics career
- Discipline: Women's artistic gymnastics
- Country represented: Russia; (1996-2009)
- Club: Dynamo Moscow
- Former coach: Nadezhda Maslennikova
- Retired: 2009
Medal record
Event	1st	2nd	3rd
Olympic Games	2	1	1
World Championships	2	3	2
World Cup Final	2	2	1
European Championships	2	4	3
European Team Championships	1	0	0
Goodwill Games	2	0	1
Universiade	0	1	3
Total	11	11	11
Representing Russia
Olympic Games
Gold medal – first place	2000 Sydney	Vault
Gold medal – first place	2000 Sydney	Floor exercise
Silver medal – second place	2000 Sydney	Team
Bronze medal – third place	2004 Athens	Team
World Championships
Gold medal – first place	1999 Tianjin	Vault
Gold medal – first place	2002 Debrecen	Vault
Silver medal – second place	1999 Tianjin	Team
Silver medal – second place	2001 Ghent	Team
Silver medal – second place	2003 Anaheim	Vault
Bronze medal – third place	1999 Tianjin	All-around
Bronze medal – third place	2006 Aarhus	Team
World Cup Final
Gold medal – first place	2000 Glasgow	Vault
Gold medal – first place	2002 Stuttgart	Vault
Silver medal – second place	2000 Glasgow	Floor exercise
Silver medal – second place	2002 Stuttgart	Balance beam
Bronze medal – third place	2006 São Paulo	Vault
European Championships
Gold medal – first place	2000 Paris	Team
Gold medal – first place	2002 Patras	Team
Silver medal – second place	1998 Saint Petersburg	Team
Silver medal – second place	2000 Paris	All-around
Silver medal – second place	2000 Paris	Vault
Silver medal – second place	2004 Amsterdam	Vault
Bronze medal – third place	2000 Paris	Balance beam
Bronze medal – third place	2004 Amsterdam	Team
Bronze medal – third place	2004 Amsterdam	All-around
European Team Championships
Gold medal – first place	2001 Riesa	Team
Goodwill Games
Gold medal – first place	2001 Brisbane	Vault
Gold medal – first place	2001 Brisbane	Floor exercise
Bronze medal – third place	2001 Brisbane	All-around
Summer Universiade
Silver medal – second place	2009 Belgrade	Team
Bronze medal – third place	2005 Izmir	Team
Bronze medal – third place	2007 Bangkok	Team
Bronze medal – third place	2007 Bangkok	Floor exercise

Elena Mikhailovna Zamolodchikova (Russian: Елена Михайловна Замолодчикова; born 19 September 1982) is a Russian former artistic gymnast and four-time Olympic medallist. She is the 2000 Olympic champion on vault and floor exercise, and she is a two-time World champion on vault (1999, 2002). She also competed at the 2004 Summer Olympics, where she won a bronze medal with the Russian team. She is a two-time World Cup Final vault champion (2000, 2002) and a two-time European champion with the Russian team (2000, 2002). In 2015, she was inducted into the International Gymnastics Hall of Fame.

== Early life ==
Zamolodchikova was born on 19 September 1982 in Moscow. Her father, Mikhail Alexandrovich, was a member of the Soviet Army and was one of the first Chernobyl liquidators, and her mother, Irina Nikolaevna, was a teacher. She began gymnastics at the age of six. She wanted to start gymnastics after watching a competition on television. She briefly quit gymnastics after being diagnosed with a congenital heart defect, but this diagnosis was refuted by another doctor, and she returned to training.

== Gymnastics career ==
Zamolodchikova joined the Russian junior national team in 1996 and competed at the 1996 Junior European Championships. There, the Russian team won the gold medal, and Zamolodchikova won the silver medal on vault.

=== 1998–1999 ===
Zamolodchikova began age-eligible for senior competition in 1998. She won a silver medal with the Russian team at the 1998 European Championships. Individually, she finished fourth on vault. At the 1998 World Youth Games in Moscow, she won the all-around title.

In 1999, Zamolodchikova participated in her first World Championships. She won the gold on the vault, silver with the Russian team, and bronze in the all-around. Following the World Championships, she competed at the Glasgow Grand Prix and won the gold medal on the vault. She won another gold medal on vault at the Stuttgart Grand Prix.

=== 2000 ===
Zamolodchikova began the Olympic season at the Montreux World Cup where she won the gold medal on the vault. Despite her father's recent death, she chose to still compete at the European Championships. There, she led her team to the gold medal and earned individual silvers in the all-around and vault finals and a bronze on the balance beam.

==== 2000 Summer Olympics ====
Zamolodchikova was selected as a member of the Russian gymnastics team at the 2000 Summer Olympics in Sydney alongside Svetlana Khorkina, Yekaterina Lobaznyuk, Elena Produnova, Anastasiya Kolesnikova, and Anna Chepeleva. The team finished in first place during the qualification round. In the team final, several major mistakes, including Zamolodchikova's fall off the balance beam, cost them the gold medal, and they won silver behind Romania. After two apparatuses in the all-around final, Zamolodchikova was in first place with her stronger exercises still to go. However, she lost her chance of an all-around medal after a fall during her floor exercise rotation. On a night when many gymnasts made uncharacteristic errors, she eventually finished sixth.

Zamolodchikova did not initially qualify for the vault final due to the two-per-country rule. However, on the day of the final, Khorkina gave up her spot to Zamolodchikova. Khorkina stated that she felt Zamolodchikova would have a better chance at winning the gold medal, and Zamolodchikova did ultimately win the gold medal with an average score of 9.712. In the floor exercise final, she beat Khorkina by 0.038 points to win her second Olympic gold medal.

After the Olympic Games, Zamolodchikova competed at the World Cup final and won gold on the vault and silver on the floor exercise. Then at the Stuttgart World Cup, she won gold on vault, balance beam, and floor exercise, and she tied with Jana Komrsková for silver on uneven bars.

=== 2001 ===
Zamolodchikova won the all-around title at the 2001 American Cup. Then at the Paris World Cup, she won gold on vault and floor exercise and silver on balance beam behind Sun Xiaojiao. She won another vault gold medal at the Cottbus World Cup in addition to a silver on uneven bars behind teammate Svetlana Khorkina. She was a member of the Russian team that won gold at the European Team Championships. At the 2001 Goodwill Games, she won the all-around bronze medal behind Sabina Cojocar and Svetlana Khorkina. In the event finals, she won gold on both vault and floor exercise. She injured her foot during the qualification round of the World Championships, but she still received the silver medal the Russian team won. Despite the injury, she competed at the Stuttgart World Cup and won the gold medal on vault.

=== 2002 ===
Zamolodchikova won a gold medal on vault and a bronze medal on uneven bars at the Glasgow World Cup. Then at the Paris World Cup, she won silver on uneven bars and bronze on vault. She was a member of the Russian team that won gold at the European Championships, and she finished fourth in the vault final. She won the gold medal on vault at the World Championships. At the 2002 World Cup Final, she tied for the gold medal on vault with Oksana Chusovitina, and she won silver on balance beam behind Sun Xiaojiao.

=== 2003 ===
Zamolodchikova withdrew from the American Cup after falling and injuring her leg on the uneven bars. She returned to competition at the Paris World Cup and won a bronze medal on the vault. She then won gold on vault at the Glasgow World Cup and a silver on balance beam, and she won another gold on vault at the Stuttgart World Cup. At the World Championships, the Russian team only finished sixth, but Zamolodchikova won the silver medal on vault.

=== 2004 ===
Zamolodchikova won a bronze medal with the Russian team at the European Championships. Individually, she won a bronze medal in the all-around and tied with teammate Anna Pavlova for the silver medal on vault. She was then selected to represent Russia at the 2004 Summer Olympics alongside Pavlova, Ludmila Ezhova, Svetlana Khorkina, Maria Kryuchkova, and Natalia Ziganshina. The team won the bronze medal, and Zamolodchikova finished fourth in the vault final.

After the Olympic Games, she won a gold medal on the vault at the Glasgow World Cup. She then won a silver medal on vault at the Stuttgart World Cup behind Pavlova. Then at the World Cup Final, she finished fourth on vault and eighth on floor exercise.

=== 2005–2006 ===
At the 2005 European Championships, Zamolodchikova qualified for the vault and floor exercise finals where she finished fifth and eighth, respectively. She was a part of the Russian team that won the bronze medal at the 2005 Summer Universiade. Then at the 2005 World Championships in Melbourne, she placed fourth in both vault and floor finals.

Zamolodchikova finished in last place at the 2006 American Cup after falling off the uneven bars. At the 2006 World Championships, she helped the Russian team to a bronze medal in the team event, their first at the World level since 2001, and qualified for the vault finals where she was fourth. After the World Championships, she won a bronze medal on the vault in the Stuttgart World Cup and two silver medals on the vault and floor exercise in the Glasgow World Cup. She finished her year with a bronze on the vault at the World Cup Finals in São Paulo, Brazil.

=== 2007–2009 ===
Zamolodchikova missed the 2007 European Championships due to a leg injury. She competed at the 2007 Summer Universiade and won bronze medals with the Russian team and on the floor exercise. At the 2007 World Championships, her teammate Ekaterina Kramarenko ran up and touched the vaulting table but stopped and received a 0. Zamolodchikova performed a solid vault, but the Russian team had already ended up eighth. In the event finals, she fell on her second vault and finished again in eighth.

Zamolodchikova continued training in 2008 in hopes of making the Russian Olympic team for the third time, but a back injury prevented her from making the team. After the Olympics, she competed at the 2008 World Cup Final and finished sixth on the vault and fourth on the floor exercise. She made her last competitive appearance at the 2009 Summer Universiade in Belgrade, where she helped the Russian team win the silver medal.

== Post-gymnastics ==
After retiring in 2009, Zamolodchikova became a gymnastics coach and a certified judge. She graduated from Lesgaft National State University of Physical Education, Sport and Health with a coaching degree. She had a heart attack in 2013. She gave birth to her first child on 21 April 2021. She was inducted into the International Gymnastics Hall of Fame in 2015.

== Eponymous skills ==
Zamolodchikova has two eponymous skills in the Code of Points.

Name	Apparatus	Description	Difficulty (Note: Valid for the 2025-2028 Code of Points)
Zamolodchikova	Vault	Tsukahara stretched with 2/1 turn (720°) off	5.2
Zamolodchikova	Balance beam	Round-off in front of beam - flic-flac with 1/1 turn (360°) to hip circle backward	E (0.5)

== Competitive history ==
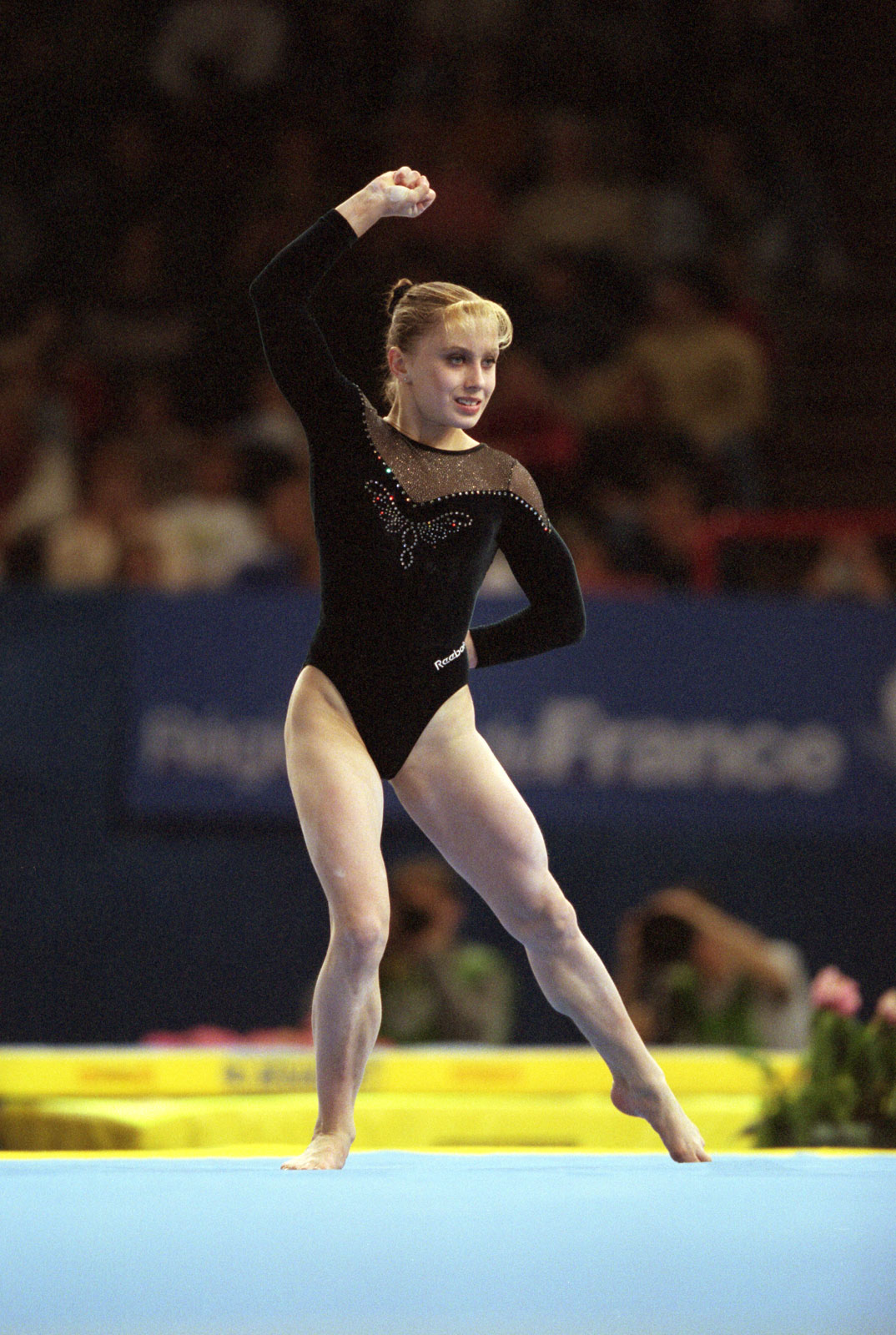
Zamolodchikova competing on floor exercise in 2001

Competitive history of Elena Zamolodchikova
Year	Event	Team	AA	VT	UB	BB	FX
1996
1996	Junior European Championships	1st place, gold medalist(s)	5	2nd place, silver medalist(s)			8
1998
1998	European Championships	2nd place, silver medalist(s)		4			
1998	World Youth Games		1st place, gold medalist(s)				
1999
1999	World Championships	2nd place, silver medalist(s)	3rd place, bronze medalist(s)	1st place, gold medalist(s)			
1999	Glasgow Grand Prix			1st place, gold medalist(s)			
1999	Stuttgart Grand Prix			1st place, gold medalist(s)			
2000	Montreux World Cup			1st place, gold medalist(s)			
2000	European Championships	1st place, gold medalist(s)	2nd place, silver medalist(s)	2nd place, silver medalist(s)		3rd place, bronze medalist(s)	8
2000	Olympic Games	2nd place, silver medalist(s)	6	1st place, gold medalist(s)			1st place, gold medalist(s)
2000	World Cup Final			1st place, gold medalist(s)			2nd place, silver medalist(s)
2000	Stuttgart World Cup			1st place, gold medalist(s)	2nd place, silver medalist(s)	1st place, gold medalist(s)	1st place, gold medalist(s)
2001	American Cup		1st place, gold medalist(s)				
2001	Paris World Cup			1st place, gold medalist(s)		2nd place, silver medalist(s)	1st place, gold medalist(s)
2001	Cottbus World Cup			1st place, gold medalist(s)	2nd place, silver medalist(s)		
2001	European Team Championships	1st place, gold medalist(s)					
2001	Goodwill Games		3rd place, bronze medalist(s)	1st place, gold medalist(s)			1st place, gold medalist(s)
2001	World Championships	2nd place, silver medalist(s)					
2001	Stuttgart World Cup			1st place, gold medalist(s)			5
2002	Glasgow World Cup			1st place, gold medalist(s)	3rd place, bronze medalist(s)	4	8
2002	Paris World Cup			3rd place, bronze medalist(s)	2nd place, silver medalist(s)		
2002	European Championships	1st place, gold medalist(s)		4			
2002	World Championships			1st place, gold medalist(s)			
2002	World Cup Final			1st place, gold medalist(s)	4	2nd place, silver medalist(s)	5
2003	American Cup		DNF				
2003	Paris World Cup			3rd place, bronze medalist(s)			
2003	Glasgow World Cup			1st place, gold medalist(s)		2nd place, silver medalist(s)	4
2003	Stuttgart World Cup			1st place, gold medalist(s)			9
2003	World Championships	6		2nd place, silver medalist(s)			
2004
2004	European Championships	3rd place, bronze medalist(s)	3rd place, bronze medalist(s)	2nd place, silver medalist(s)		7	
2004	Olympic Games	3rd place, bronze medalist(s)		4			
2004	Glasgow World Cup			1st place, gold medalist(s)	4		7
2004	Stuttgart World Cup			2nd place, silver medalist(s)			4
2004	World Cup Final			4			8
2005
2005	European Championships			5			8
2005	Universiade	3rd place, bronze medalist(s)					
2005	World Championships		16	4			4
2006	American Cup		8				
2006	World Championships	3rd place, bronze medalist(s)		6			
2006	Stuttgart World Cup			3rd place, bronze medalist(s)			
2006	Glasgow World Cup			2nd place, silver medalist(s)			2nd place, silver medalist(s)
2006	World Cup Final			3rd place, bronze medalist(s)			6
2007	Universiade	3rd place, bronze medalist(s)					3rd place, bronze medalist(s)
2007	World Championships	8		8			
2008
2008	World Cup Final			6			4
2009	Universiade	2nd place, silver medalist(s)					

== See also ==
- List of Olympic female gymnasts for Russia
- Katya Zamolodchikova, an American drag queen who bears Elena Zamolodchikova's last name as a tribute.
