= List of Olympic female artistic gymnasts for Russia =

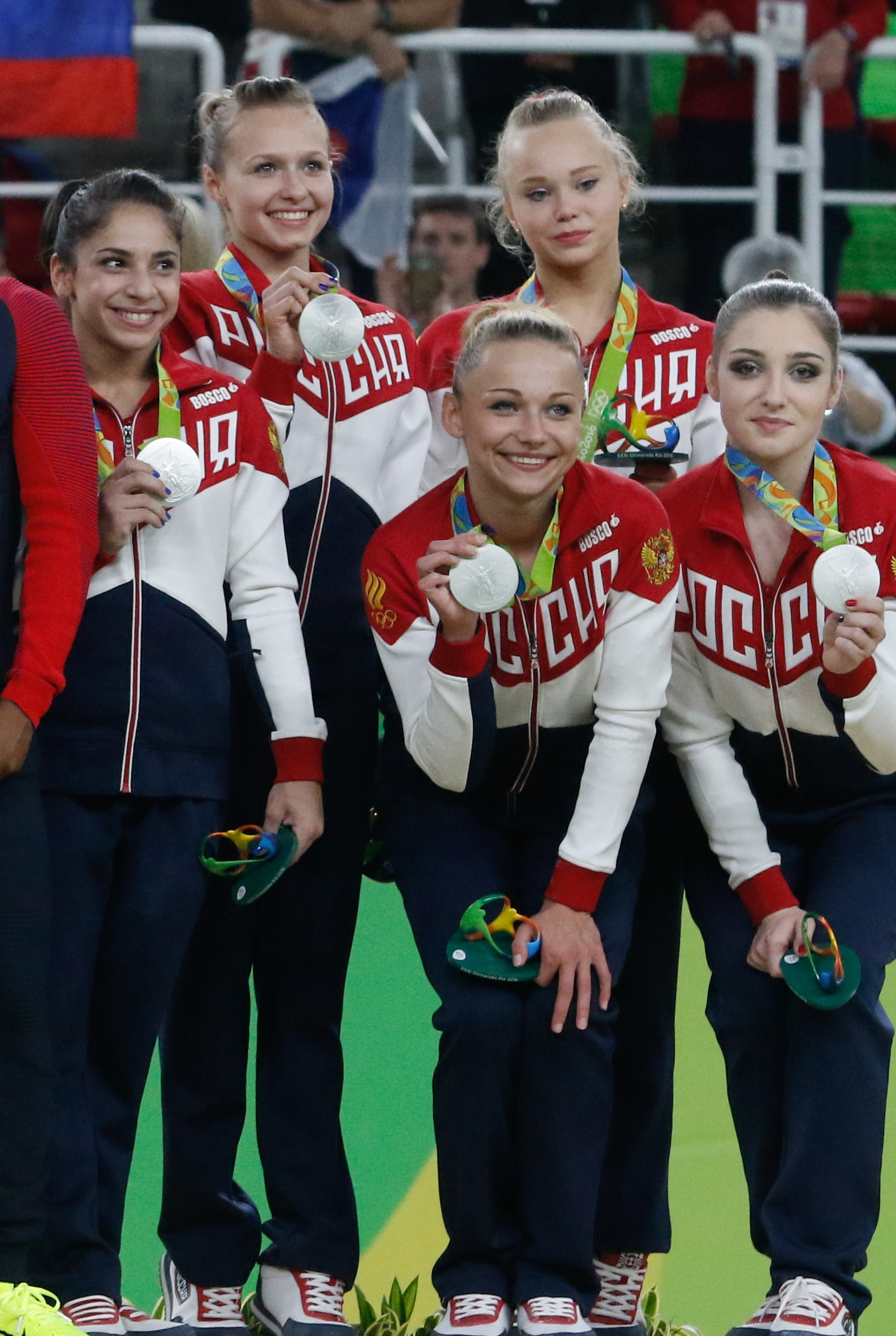
The Russian team at the 2016 Olympics

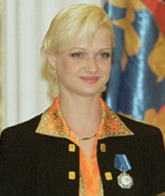
Svetlana Khorkina

Gymnastics events have been staged at the Olympic Games since 1896 with Russian female gymnasts having participated in every Olympic Games between 1996–2020. They did not participate at the 2024 Olympic Games due to them being banned as a team and refusing to participate as individual neutral athletes. A total of 32 female artistic gymnasts have represented Russia or the Russian Olympic Committee and they have won 27 medals, including a team gold in 2020. As a team Russia has won one gold, three silvers, and one bronze.

The most decorated Russian females artistic gymnasts are Svetlana Khorkina (1996, 2000, 2004) and Aliya Mustafina (2012, 2016) with seven Olympic medals each. Mustafina was the first Russian gymnast to defend two medals at consecutive games: she won bronze in all-around and gold on uneven bars in 2012 as well as the 2016 Summer Olympics.

== Gymnasts ==
=== Summer Olympics ===
The following only counts medals won by gymnasts when they represented Russia or the Russian Olympic Committee (Not the Unified Team or the Soviet Union). Example: Rozalia Galiyeva won a gold medal with the Unified Team in 1992, but only the silver medal she won in 1996 appears here.

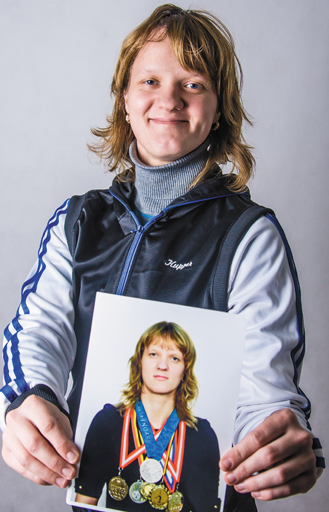
Anna Chepeleva

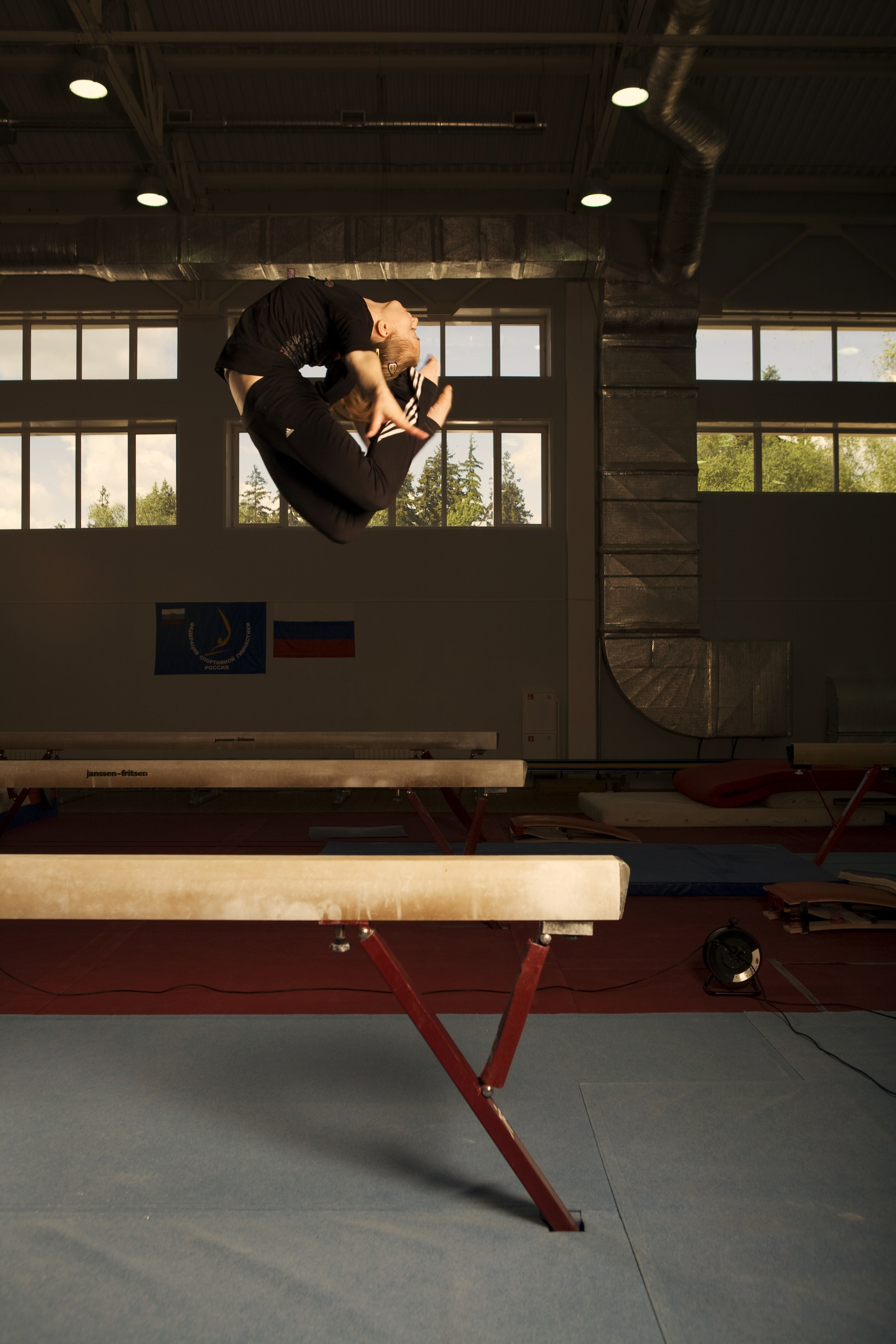
Ksenia Semenova

Gymnast	Years	Gold	Silver	Bronze	Total medals	Ref.
Ksenia Afanasyeva	2008, 2012	0	1	0	1	
Lilia Akhaimova	2020	1	0	0	1	
Anna Chepeleva	2000	0	1	0	1	
Elena Dolgopolova	1996	0	1	0	1	
Ludmila Ezhova	2004, 2008	0	0	1	1	
Rozalia Galiyeva	1996	0	1	0	1	
Elena Gerasimova	2020	0	0	0	0	
Anastasia Grishina	2012	0	1	0	1	
Elena Grosheva	1996	0	1	0	1	
Anastasia Ilyankova	2020	0	1	0	1	
Svetlana Khorkina	1996, 2000, 2004	2	4	1	7	
Dina Kochetkova	1996	0	1	0	1	
Anastasiya Kolesnikova	2000	0	1	0	1	
Viktoria Komova	2012	0	2	0	2	
Svetlana Klyukina	2008	0	0	0	0	
Ekaterina Kramarenko	2008	0	0	0	0	
Maria Kryuchkova	2004	0	0	1	1	
Yevgeniya Kuznetsova	1996	0	1	0	1	
Viktoria Listunova	2020	1	0	0	1	
Yekaterina Lobaznyuk	2000	0	2	1	3	
Oksana Lyapina	1996	0	1	0	1	
Angelina Melnikova	2016, 2020	1	1	2	4	
Aliya Mustafina	2012, 2016	2	2	3	7	
Maria Paseka	2012, 2016	0	3	1	4	
Anna Pavlova	2004, 2008	0	0	2	2	
Elena Produnova	2000	0	1	1	2	
Ksenia Semenova	2008	0	0	0	0	
Daria Spiridonova	2016	0	1	0	1	
Seda Tutkhalyan	2016	0	1	0	1	
Vladislava Urazova	2020	1	0	0	1	
Elena Zamolodchikova	2000, 2004	2	1	1	4	
Natalia Ziganshina	2004	0	0	1	1	

=== Youth Olympic Games ===
Gymnast	Years	Gold	Silver	Bronze	Total medals	Ref.
Viktoria Komova	2010	3	0	1	4	
Seda Tutkhalyan	2014	2	1	0	3	
Ksenia Klimenko	2018	1	1	0	2	

== Medalists ==
Medal	Name	Year	Event
Silver	Dolgopolova, Galiyeva, Grosheva, Khorkina, Kochetkova, Kuznetsova, Liapina	(United States) 1996 Atlanta	Women's team
Gold	Svetlana Khorkina	(United States) 1996 Atlanta	Women's uneven bars
Silver	Chepeleva, Khorkina, Kolesnikova, Lobaznyuk, Produnova, Zamolodchikova	(Australia) 2000 Sydney	Women's team
Gold	Elena Zamolodchikova	(Australia) 2000 Sydney	Women's vault
Bronze	Yekaterina Lobaznyuk	(Australia) 2000 Sydney	Women's vault
Gold	Svetlana Khorkina	(Australia) 2000 Sydney	Women's uneven bars
Silver	Yekaterina Lobaznyuk	(Australia) 2000 Sydney	Women's balance beam
Bronze	Elena Produnova	(Australia) 2000 Sydney	Women's balance beam
Gold	Elena Zamolodchikova	(Australia) 2000 Sydney	Women's floor exercise
Silver	Svetlana Khorkina	(Australia) 2000 Sydney	Women's floor exercise
Bronze	Ezhova, Khorkina, Krioutchkova, Pavlova, Zamolodchikova, Ziganshina	(Greece) 2004 Athens	Women's team
Silver	Svetlana Khorkina	(Greece) 2004 Athens	Women's all-around
Bronze	Anna Pavlova	(Greece) 2004 Athens	Women's vault
Silver	Afanasyeva, Grishina, Komova, Mustafina, Paseka	(United Kingdom) 2012 London	Women's team
Silver	Viktoria Komova	(United Kingdom) 2012 London	Women's all-around
Bronze	Aliya Mustafina	(United Kingdom) 2012 London	Women's all-around
Bronze	Maria Paseka	(United Kingdom) 2012 London	Women's vault
Gold	Aliya Mustafina	(United Kingdom) 2012 London	Women's uneven bars
Bronze	Aliya Mustafina	(United Kingdom) 2012 London	Women's floor exercise
Silver	Melnikova, Mustafina, Paseka, Spiridonova, Tutkhalyan	(Brazil) 2016 Rio de Janeiro	Women's team
Bronze	Aliya Mustafina	(Brazil) 2016 Rio de Janeiro	Women's all-around
Silver	Maria Paseka	(Brazil) 2016 Rio de Janeiro	Women's vault
Gold	Aliya Mustafina	(Brazil) 2016 Rio de Janeiro	Women's uneven bars
Gold	Akhaimova, Listunova, Melnikova, Urazova ( (Russia) ROC)	(Japan) 2020 Tokyo	Women's team
Bronze	Angelina Melnikova ( (Russia) ROC)	(Japan) 2020 Tokyo	Women's all-around
Silver	Anastasia Ilyankova ( (Russia) ROC)	(Japan) 2020 Tokyo	Women's uneven bars
Bronze	Angelina Melnikova ( (Russia) ROC)	(Japan) 2020 Tokyo	Women's floor exercise

== See also ==
- List of Olympic female gymnasts for the Soviet Union
- List of Olympic male artistic gymnasts for Russia
