= Gymnastics at the 2000 Summer Olympics – Women's artistic team all-around =

Women's artistic team all-around at the Games of the XXVII Olympiad

Medalists
1st place, gold medalist(s)		Simona Amânar, Loredana Boboc, Andreea Isărescu, Maria Olaru, Claudia Presacan and Andreea Răducan	Romania
2nd place, silver medalist(s)		Anna Chepeleva, Svetlana Khorkina, Anastasiya Kolesnikova, Yekaterina Lobaznyuk, Elena Produnova, and Elena Zamolodchikova	Russia
3rd place, bronze medalist(s)		Amy Chow, Jamie Dantzscher, Dominique Dawes, Kristen Maloney, Elise Ray and Tasha Schwikert	United States

These are the results of the women's team all-around competition, one of six events for female competitors in artistic gymnastics at the 2000 Summer Olympics in Sydney. The qualification and final rounds took place on September 17 and 19 at the Sydney SuperDome. The number of gymnasts that made up each national team had changed again from 7 in the 1996 Summer Olympics in Atlanta and back to 6, the number from the 1992 Summer Olympics in Barcelona. The format was similar to that of 1996, but specific to Sydney, 5 out of 6 gymnasts would compete on each apparatus where only the top 4 scores would count towards the final combined score at the end.

After questions were raised about several athletes' ages at the 2008 Olympics, the International Gymnastics Federation also opened an investigation into two athletes from these games.

In February 2010, FIG ruled that Dong Fangxiao was only 14 during the Sydney Olympics, two years younger than the minimum age requirement for Olympic competition. Her results from the 1999 World Championships and 2000 Olympics were deleted from the records, and the FIG recommended that the IOC disqualify the Chinese all-around team and strip them of the bronze medal. The IOC agreed with the recommendation, and reallocated the bronze medals on April 28, 2010. On August 11, 2010, the reallocated medals were awarded to the fourth-placed United States team at a formal awards ceremony during the United States National Championships at the XL Center.

== Results ==
=== Qualification ===
Twelve national teams composed by six gymnasts competed in the team all-around event in the artistic gymnastics qualification round on September 17. The six highest scoring teams advanced to the final on September 19.

=== Final ===
Rank	Team	Vault	Uneven Bars	Balance Beam	Floor Exercise	Total
Gold medal	Romania	38.461 (2)	38.237 (5)	38.986 (1)	38.924 (2)	154.608
Gold medal	Andreea Răducan	9.712	9.550	9.837	9.762	38.861
Gold medal	Maria Olaru	9.581	9.525	9.787	9.687	38.580
Gold medal	Simona Amânar	9.593	9.437	9.762	9.775	38.567
Gold medal	Loredana Boboc	9.400	9.475	9.600	9.700	38.175
Gold medal	Andreea Isărescu	9.575	9.687		9.600	28.862
Gold medal	Claudia Presacan			9.450		9.450
Silver medal	Russia	38.605 (1)	38.862 (2)	37.899 (3)	39.037 (1)	154.403
Silver medal	Elena Produnova	9.212	9.800	9.775	9.725	38.512
Silver medal	Svetlana Khorkina	9.762	9.000	9.712	9.787	38.261
Silver medal	Yekaterina Lobaznyuk	9.625	9.700	9.175	9.750	38.250
Silver medal	Elena Zamolodchikova	9.756	9.712	8.862	9.775	38.105
Silver medal	Anastasiya Kolesnikova		9.650	9.237		18.887
Silver medal	Anna Chepeleva	9.462			9.300	18.762
Bronze medal	United States	37.685 (4)	38.875 (1)	37.699 (5)	38.674 (3)	152.933
Bronze medal	Amy Chow	9.350	9.750	9.112	9.625	37.837
Bronze medal	Elise Ray	9.418	9.725	9.337	9.337	37.817
Bronze medal	Jamie Dantzscher	9.424	9.700		9.712	28.836
Bronze medal	Kristen Maloney	9.493		9.537	9.737	28.767
Bronze medal	Tasha Schwikert		9.675	9.350	9.600	28.625
Bronze medal	Dominique Dawes	9.243	9.700	9.475		28.418
4	Spain	37.730 (3)	38.523 (4)	37.861 (4)	37.999 (4)	152.113
4	Esther Moya	9.643	9.637	9.625	9.662	38.567
4	Sara Moro	9.350	9.562	9.487	9.387	37.786
4	Laura Martinez	9.406	9.637	9.562	8.950	37.555
4	Susana Garcia		9.687	9.187	9.425	28.299
4	Marta Cusido	9.175	9.437	8.625		27.237
4	Paloma Moro	9.331			9.525	18.856
5	Ukraine	37.185 (5)	38.674 (3)	38.625 (2)	37.362 (5)	151.846
5	Viktoria Karpenko	9.343	9.737	9.750	9.550	38.380
5	Tetyana Yarosh	9.324	9.450	9.550	9.600	37.924
5	Olga Roshchupkina	9.212	9.687	9.675	8.812	37.386
5	Halyna Tyryk	9.068	9.600	9.462	8.962	37.092
5	Olha Teslenko			9.650	9.250	28.550
5	Alona Kvasha	9.306				9.306
DSQ	China	38.073 (-)	38.962 (-)	39.099 (-)	37.874 (-)	154.008
DSQ	Yang Yun	9.662	9.775	9.737	9.662	38.836
DSQ	Ling Jie	9.393	9.775	9.800	9.425	38.393
DSQ	Dong Fangxiao	9.575	9.625	9.800	9.375	38.375
DSQ	Liu Xuan	9.443	9.662	9.762	9.262	38.129
DSQ	Huang Mandan		9.750		9.412	19.162
DSQ	Kui Yuanyuan					0.000
