= 2000 European Women's Artistic Gymnastics Championships =

23rd European Women's Artistic Gymnastics Championships
- Location: Paris, France
- Dates: 12–14 May 2000

The 23rd European Women's Artistic Gymnastics Championships were held from 12 to 14 May 2000 in Paris, France.

== Medalists ==
Event	Gold	Silver	Bronze
Seniors
Team	Russia; Svetlana Khorkina; Elena Zamolodchikova; Elena Produnova; Yekaterina Lobaznyuk; Yevgeniya Kuznetsova	Ukraine; Viktoria Karpenko; Olga Roschupkina; Tatiana Yarosh; Nataliya Horodniy; Alona Kvasha	Romania; Andreea Răducan; Simona Amânar; Andreea Isărescu; Loredana Boboc
All-Around	Svetlana Khorkina (RUS)	Elena Zamolodchikova (RUS)	Viktoria Karpenko (UKR)
Vault	Simona Amânar (ROU)	Elena Zamolodchikova (RUS)	Esther Moya (ESP)
Uneven Bars	Svetlana Khorkina (RUS)	Viktoria Karpenko (UKR)	Elena Produnova (RUS)
Balance Beam	Svetlana Khorkina (RUS)	Simona Amânar (ROU)	Elena Zamolodchikova (RUS)
Floor	Ludivine Furnon (FRA)	Viktoria Karpenko (UKR); Andreea Răducan (ROU); Elena Produnova (RUS)	none awarded
Juniors
Team	Russia	Romania	Netherlands
All-Around	Sabina Cojocar (ROU)	Silvia Stroescu (ROU)	Natalia Ziganshina (RUS)
Vault	Sabina Cojocar (ROU)	Natalia Sirobaba (UKR)	Maria Zasypkina (RUS)
Uneven Bars	Anna Pavlova (RUS)	Natalia Ziganshina (RUS)	Verona van de Leur (NED)
Balance Beam	Sabina Cojocar (ROU); Silvia Stroescu (ROU)	none awarded	Irina Yarotska (UKR)
Floor	Silvia Stroescu (ROU)	Sabina Cojocar (ROU)	Marlène Peron (FRA)

=== Medal table ===
==== Combined ====
Rank	Nation	Gold	Silver	Bronze	Total
1	Romania (ROU)	6	5	1	12
2	Russia (RUS)	6	4	4	14
3	France (FRA)	1	0	1	2
4	Ukraine (UKR)	0	4	2	6
5	Netherlands (NED)	0	0	2	2
6	Spain (ESP)	0	0	1	1
Totals (6 entries)		13	13	11	37

==== Seniors ====
Rank	Nation	Gold	Silver	Bronze	Total
1	Russia (RUS)	4	3	2	9
2	Romania (ROU)	1	2	1	4
3	France (FRA)	1	0	0	1
4	Ukraine (UKR)	0	3	1	4
5	Spain (ESP)	0	0	1	1
Totals (5 entries)		6	8	5	19

==== Juniors ====
Rank	Nation	Gold	Silver	Bronze	Total
1	Romania (ROU)	5	3	0	8
2	Russia (RUS)	2	1	2	5
3	Ukraine (UKR)	0	1	1	2
4	Netherlands (NED)	0	0	2	2
5	France (FRA)	0	0	1	1
Totals (5 entries)		7	5	6	18

== Seniors ==
=== Team ===
The team competition also served as qualification for the individual all-around and event finals. The top 8 placing teams are listed below.

Rank	Team	Vault (gymnastics)	Uneven bars	Balance beam	Floor (gymnastics)	Total
1st place, gold medalist(s)	Russia	28.661	29.262	28.637	29.200	115.760
1st place, gold medalist(s)	Svetlana Khorkina	9.468	9.850	9.775	9.725	115.760
1st place, gold medalist(s)	Elena Zamolodchikova	9.662	9.650	9.662	9.650	115.760
1st place, gold medalist(s)	Elena Produnova	9.531	9.762	9.200	9.825	115.760
1st place, gold medalist(s)	Yekaterina Lobaznyuk					115.760
1st place, gold medalist(s)	Yevgeniya Kuznetsova					115.760
2nd place, silver medalist(s)	Ukraine	28.142	29.024	29.062	29.074	115.302
2nd place, silver medalist(s)	Viktoria Karpenko	9.518	9.812	9.737	9.800	115.302
2nd place, silver medalist(s)	Olga Roschupkina	9.212	9.637	9.675	9.687	115.302
2nd place, silver medalist(s)	Tatiana Yarosh			9.650	9.587	115.302
2nd place, silver medalist(s)	Nataliya Horodniy		9.575			115.302
2nd place, silver medalist(s)	Alona Kvasha	9.412				115.302
3rd place, bronze medalist(s)	Romania	28.305	28.487	28.700	29.211	114.703
3rd place, bronze medalist(s)	Andreea Răducan	9.387	9.600	9.850	9.787	114.703
3rd place, bronze medalist(s)	Simona Amânar	9.637	9.162	9.650	9.762	114.703
3rd place, bronze medalist(s)	Andreea Isărescu	9.281	9.725			114.703
3rd place, bronze medalist(s)	Loredana Boboc			9.200	9.662	114.703
4	Spain	28.273	28.874	27.212	28.449	112.808
4	Esther Moya	9.618	9.600	9.037	9.437	112.808
4	Sara Moro	9.249	9.587	9.250	9.550	112.808
4	Laura Martínez	9.406	9.687	8.925	9.462	112.808
5	Italy	27.205	28.386	27.924	28.150	111.665
5	Adriana Crisci	9.368	9.662	9.412	9.675	111.665
5	Monica Bergamelli	8.331	9.237	9.062	9.250	111.665
5	Martina Bremini	9.506	9.487			111.665
5	Elena Olivetti			9.450	9.225	111.665
6	France	26.774	28.112	27.375	28.836	111.097
6	Ludivine Furnon		9.550	8.875	9.787	111.097
6	Elvire Teza	8.875	9.650	9.300		111.097
6	Alexandra Soler	8.937	8.912		9.462	111.097
6	Nelly Ramassamy	8.962		9.200		111.097
6	Delphine Regease				9.587	111.097
7	Great Britain	26.785	28.249	27.287	28.161	110.482
7	Lisa Mason	9.074	9.487	9.437	9.412	110.482
7	Emma Williams	9.349			9.337	110.482
7	Sharna Murray		9.525	9.125		110.482
7	Kelly Hackman		9.237	8.725		110.482
7	Paula Thomas	8.362			9.412	110.482
8	Belarus	27.555	28.186	26.749	27.787	110.277
8	Alena Polozkova	9.137	9.212	8.400	9.512	110.277
8	Inna Poklonskaya	9.262		9.412	9.475	110.277
8	Tatiana Zharganova		9.662	8.937	8.800	110.277
8	Marina Zarzhitskaya	9.156	9.312			110.277

=== All-around ===
Rank	Gymnast	Vault (gymnastics)	Uneven bars	Balance beam	Floor (gymnastics)	Total
1st place, gold medalist(s)	Svetlana Khorkina (RUS)	9.362	9.875	9.737	9.775	38.749
2nd place, silver medalist(s)	Elena Zamolodchikova (RUS)	9.612	9.662	9.675	9.675	38.624
3rd place, bronze medalist(s)	Viktoria Karpenko (UKR)	9.531	9.800	9.350	9.775	38.456
4	Esther Moya (ESP)	9.593	9.587	9.662	9.600	38.442
5	Olga Roschupkina (UKR)	9.418	9.637	9.712	9.637	38.404
6	Andreea Răducan (ROU)	9.331	9.600	9.750	9.650	38.331
7	Sara Moro (ESP)	9.181	9.600	9.700	9.575	38.056
8	Simona Amânar (ROU)	9.650	8.887	9.762	9.750	38.049
9	Jana Komrsková (CZE)	9.237	9.575	9.337	9.350	37.499
10	Lisa Mason (GBR)	9.281	9.500	9.025	9.562	37.368
11	Monica Bergamelli (ITA)	9.250	9.487	9.137	9.425	37.299
12	Birgit Schweigert (GER)	9.162	9.437	9.137	9.175	36.911
13	Zuzana Sekerová (SVK)	9.000	9.187	9.300	9.187	36.674
14	Monique Nuijten (NED)	9.218	9.350	9.262	8.750	36.580
15	Kateřina Marešová (CZE)	8.943	9.575	8.537	9.075	36.130
16	Dagmar Fehrenschild (GER)	8.981	9.562	8.537	9.050	36.130
17	Joanna Skowrońska (POL)	9.131	9.325	8.750	8.900	36.106
18	Adriana Crisci (ITA)	9.299	8.012	9.487	9.300	36.098
19	Adrienn Nyeste (HUN)	9.187	9.687	8.000	9.012	35.886
20	Alena Polozkova (BLR)	9.062	8.862	8.787	9.025	35.736
21	Sigrid Persoon (BEL)	9.156	9.412	7.687	9.362	35.617
22	Annik Salzmann (SUI)	8.750	8.987	8.237	9.237	35.211
23	Mojca Mavrič (SLO)	8.831	8.387	8.575	9.062	34.855
24	Laetitia Reho (BEL)	8.956	8.612	7.625	8.950	34.143

=== Vault ===
Rank	Gymnast	Total
1st place, gold medalist(s)	Simona Amânar (ROU)	9.674
2nd place, silver medalist(s)	Elena Zamolodchikova (RUS)	9.668
3rd place, bronze medalist(s)	Esther Moya (ESP)	9.574
4	Elena Produnova (RUS)	9.543
5	Viktoria Karpenko (UKR)	9.512
6	Alona Kvasha (UKR)	9.418
7	Martina Bremini (ITA)	9.337
8	Laura Martínez (ESP)	8.618

=== Uneven bars ===
Rank	Gymnast	Total
1st place, gold medalist(s)	Svetlana Khorkina (RUS)	9.837
2nd place, silver medalist(s)	Viktoria Karpenko (UKR)	9.800
3rd place, bronze medalist(s)	Elena Produnova (RUS)	9.775
4	Andreea Isărescu (ROU)	9.725
5	Laura Martínez (ESP)	9.612
6	Tatiana Zharganova (BLR)	9.550
7	Adriana Crisci (ITA)	9.325
8	Adrienn Nyeste (HUN)	9.287

=== Balance beam ===
Rank	Gymnast	Total
1st place, gold medalist(s)	Svetlana Khorkina (RUS)	9.837
2nd place, silver medalist(s)	Simona Amânar (ROU)	9.800
3rd place, bronze medalist(s)	Elena Zamolodchikova (RUS)	9.762
4	Viktoria Karpenko (UKR)	9.587
5	Andreea Răducan (ROU)	9.475
6	Olga Roschupkina (UKR)	9.350
7	Lisa Mason (GBR)	9.275
8	Elena Olivetti (ITA)	8.625

=== Floor exercise ===
Rank	Gymnast	Total
1st place, gold medalist(s)	Ludivine Furnon (FRA)	9.875
2nd place, silver medalist(s)	Viktoria Karpenko (UKR)	9.812
2nd place, silver medalist(s)	Andreea Răducan (ROU)	9.812
2nd place, silver medalist(s)	Elena Produnova (RUS)	9.812
5	Simona Amânar (ROU)	9.800
6	Olga Roschupkina (UKR)	9.737
7	Adriana Crisci (ITA)	9.600
8	Elena Zamolodchikova (RUS)	9.437

== Juniors ==
=== Team ===
Rank	Team	Vault (gymnastics)	Uneven bars	Balance beam	Floor (gymnastics)	Total
1st place, gold medalist(s)	Russia	28.148	28.324	29.137	28.500	114.109
2nd place, silver medalist(s)	Romania	27.980	27.637	28.824	29.037	113.478
3rd place, bronze medalist(s)	Netherlands	27.648	27.999	27.912	28.525	112.084
4	France	27.754	27.236	27.024	28.649	110.663
5	Ukraine	27.604	28.662	26.125	28.062	110.453
6	Spain	27.423	28.087	25.949	27.449	108.908
7	Italy	27.217	27.449	26.537	27.512	108.715
8	Great Britain	27.379	27.574	26.299	25.686	106.938

=== All-around ===
Rank	Gymnast	Vault (gymnastics)	Uneven bars	Balance beam	Floor (gymnastics)	Total
1st place, gold medalist(s)	Sabina Cojocar (ROU)	9.568	9.500	9.662	9.712	38.442
2nd place, silver medalist(s)	Silvia Stroescu (ROU)	9.299	9.262	9.675	9.737	37.973
3rd place, bronze medalist(s)	Natalia Ziganshina (RUS)	9.012	9.662	9.687	9.462	37.823
4	Irina Yarotska (UKR)	9.118	9.612	9.587	9.475	37.792
5	Anna Pavlova (RUS)	9.118	9.662	9.100	8.862	36.742
6	Elena Gómez (ESP)	8.881	9.075	9.325	9.325	36.606
7	Rikst Valentijn (NED)	9.100	8.750	9.550	9.137	36.537
8	Ilaria Colombo (ITA)	9.137	8.650	8.937	9.587	36.311
9	Alba Planas (ESP)	9.068	9.500	8.225	9.375	36.168
10	Rebecca Mason (GBR)	8.831	9.325	8.862	9.150	36.168
11	Verona van de Leur (NED)	9.093	9.562	7.887	9.450	35.992
12	Joanna Skibko (POL)	9.037	8.600	8.837	9.375	35.849
13	Daria Bijak (GER)	9.018	9.287	9.125	8.300	35.730
14	Beth Tweddle (GBR)	8.949	9.200	8.175	9.212	35.536
15	Natalia Sirobaba (UKR)	8.937	9.687	8.275	8.500	35.399
16	Csilla Andó (HUN)	8.981	8.687	8.712	9.000	35.380
17	Cristina Cavalli (ITA)	8.937	9.200	7.700	9.362	35.199
18	Yulia Tarasenka (BLR)	8.806	7.862	8.762	9.137	34.567
19	Lucie Janečková (CZE)	8.412	8.475	8.600	8.550	34.037
20	Natalia Dikina (LAT)	8.581	8.450	8.187	8.712	33.930
21	Anna Isaakidou (GRE)	8.481	8.962	7.637	8.575	33.655
22	Janina Jeworutzki (GER)	8.768	8.400	7.550	8.725	33.443
23	Stefany Zaroug (ISR)	8.531	8.775	7.462	7.600	33.368
24	Maja Hribar (SLO)	0.000	9.225	8.062	5.925	23.212

=== Vault ===
Rank	Gymnast	Total
1st place, gold medalist(s)	Sabina Cojocar (ROU)	9.456
2nd place, silver medalist(s)	Natalia Sirobaba (UKR)	9.424
3rd place, bronze medalist(s)	Maria Zasypkina (RUS)	9.362
4	Suzanne Harmes (NED)	9.300
5	Natalia Ziganshina (RUS)	9.206
6	Janina Jeworutzki (GER)	9.175
6	Jessica Jans (BEL)	9.175
8	Clélia Coutzac (FRA)	9.062
9	Silvia Stroescu (ROU)	8.937

=== Uneven bars ===
Rank	Gymnast	Total
1st place, gold medalist(s)	Anna Pavlova (RUS)	9.687
2nd place, silver medalist(s)	Natalia Ziganshina (RUS)	9.675
3rd place, bronze medalist(s)	Verona van de Leur (NED)	9.662
4	Irina Yarotska (UKR)	9.637
5	Alba Planas (ESP)	9.625
6	Elizabeth Tweddle (GBR)	9.537
7	Carmen Ionescu (ROU)	9.337
8	Natalia Sirobaba (UKR)	9.150

=== Balance beam ===
Rank	Gymnast	Total
1st place, gold medalist(s)	Sabina Cojocar (ROU)	9.600
1st place, gold medalist(s)	Silvia Stroescu (ROU)	9.600
3rd place, bronze medalist(s)	Irina Yarotska (UKR)	9.575
4	Verona van de Leur (NED)	9.437
5	Marlène Peron (FRA)	9.325
6	Maria Zasypkina (RUS)	8.900
7	Natalia Ziganshina (RUS)	8.837
8	Ilaria Colombo (ITA)	8.762

=== Floor exercise ===
Rank	Gymnast	Total
1st place, gold medalist(s)	Silvia Stroescu (ROU)	9.725
2nd place, silver medalist(s)	Sabina Cojocar (ROU)	9.712
3rd place, bronze medalist(s)	Marlène Peron (FRA)	9.675
4	Natalia Ziganshina (RUS)	9.587
5	Rikst Valentijn (NED)	9.525
6	Marion Mourier (FRA)	9.500
7	Irina Yarotska (UKR)	9.487
8	Maria Zasypkina (RUS)	9.287
