= Gymnastics at the 2000 Summer Olympics – Women's vault =

Women's vault at the Games of the XXVII Olympiad

Medalists
1st place, gold medalist(s)		Elena Zamolodchikova	Russia
2nd place, silver medalist(s)		Andreea Răducan	Romania
3rd place, bronze medalist(s)		Yekaterina Lobaznyuk	Russia

These are the results of the women's vault competition, one of four events for female competitors in artistic gymnastics at the 2000 Summer Olympics in Sydney. The qualification and final rounds took place on September 17 and 24 at the Sydney SuperDome.

== Results ==
=== Qualification ===
Eighty-three gymnasts competed in the vault event during the qualification round on September 17. The eight highest scoring gymnasts advanced to the final on September 24. Each country was limited to two competitors in the final.

=== Vault height error ===
During the women's all-around competition, an error in the published apparatus norms led to personnel setting the vault at 120 centimetres (47 in) instead of 125 centimetres (49 in); the standard set by the International Gymnastics Federation in 1998. Many gymnasts, including favorite Svetlana Khorkina, fell while vaulting over the improperly set equipment. Great Britain's Annika Reeder was injured badly enough that she had to withdraw from the competition entirely. The error was discovered during the third rotation’s warmup by sixteen-year-old Australian gymnast Allana Slater.

The 18 gymnasts who had vaulted in the first half of the competition were offered the chance to redo their vaults. Not all chose to do so.

This error occurred only during the women's all-around competition. The vault height was set correctly for all other vault events.

=== Final ===
Rank	Gymnast	Vault 1	Vault 2	Average
Gold medal	Elena Zamolodchikova (RUS)	9.712	9.750	9.731
Silver medal	Andreea Răducan (ROU)	9.725	9.662	9.693
Bronze medal	Yekaterina Lobaznyuk (RUS)	9.662	9.687	9.674
4	Esther Moya (ESP)	9.762	9.475	9.618
5	Laura Martínez (ESP)	9.662	9.562	9.612
6	Simona Amânar (ROU)	9.625	9.450	9.537
7	Denisse López (MEX)	9.087	8.600	8.843

Note: Dong Fangxiao (CHN) was disqualified on April 28, 2010, due to the discovery that she was underaged when she competed. She averaged a 9.487 on her two vaults in the event final and would have placed seventh.
