= Handspring double salto forward tucked =

Vault

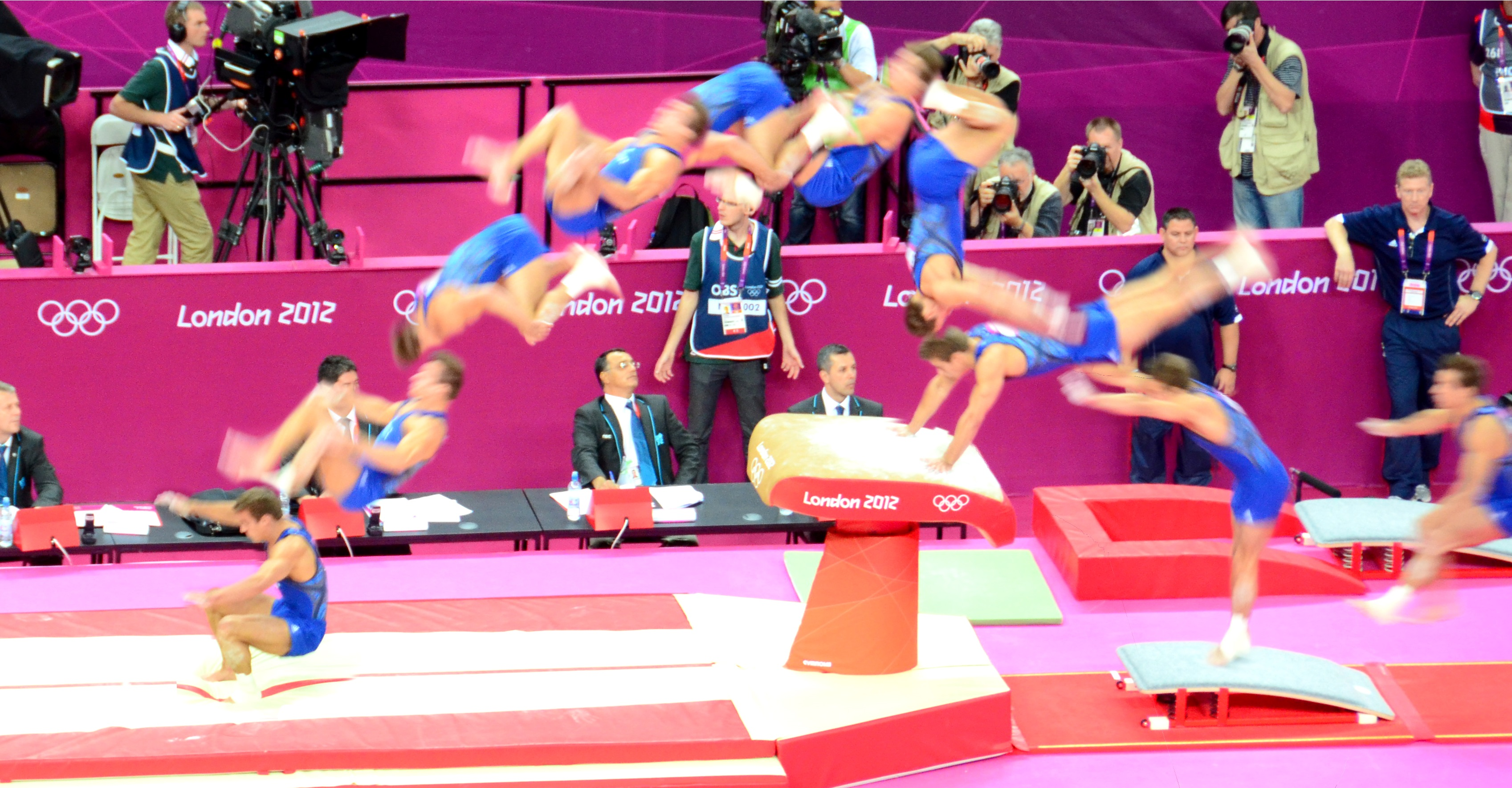
A multiple-exposure image of a gymnast performing the vault at the 2012 Summer Olympics.

The handspring double salto forward tucked, known as a Produnova in women's artistic gymnastics and a Roche in men's artistic gymnastics, is a vault consisting of a front handspring onto the vaulting horse and two front somersaults in a tucked position off it.

== Men's Artistic Gymnastics ==
The first person to complete the vault was Cuban gymnast Jorge Roche in 1980.

23 Roche vaults were performed during the 2000 Summer Olympics.

By 2010, male gymnasts had developed more difficult variations by performing it piked or with twists.

== Women's Artistic Gymnastics ==
Under the 2017–2020 Code of Points (artistic gymnastics) for WAG, the vault had a D-score of 6.4, and is considered one of the hardest vaults ever performed in women's artistic gymnastics. It is currently tied with the Biles vault as the vault with the second-highest D-score. It is named after Yelena Produnova of Russia, who was the first woman to complete it successfully in 1999. Produnova's coach, Leonid Arkayev, bet her that she could not perform the vault. The D-score of the Produnova has been slowly reduced over the quads from 7.1 (2009–2012), to 7.0 (2013–2016), to 6.4 (2017–2020). In the 2022–2024 Code of Points, it has been reduced to a D-score of 6.0.

The vault is dangerous because a gymnast could break her neck if she fell short of two rotations. At the 2016 Summer Olympics, Uzbek gymnast Oksana Chusovitina attempted the Produnova but fell. The vault is termed the "vault of death" due to its high level of difficulty and likelihood of injury. Asked why she did not perform the vault, Simone Biles stated, "I’m not trying to die."

=== Gymnasts who have successfully completed the Produnova ===
- Yelena Produnova (RUS) (1999)
- Yamilet Peña (DOM) (2011)
- Fadwa Mahmoud (EGY) (2014)
- Dipa Karmakar (IND) (2014 and 2016)
- Oksana Chusovitina (UZB)
