= Silvia Stroescu =

Romanian artistic gymnast

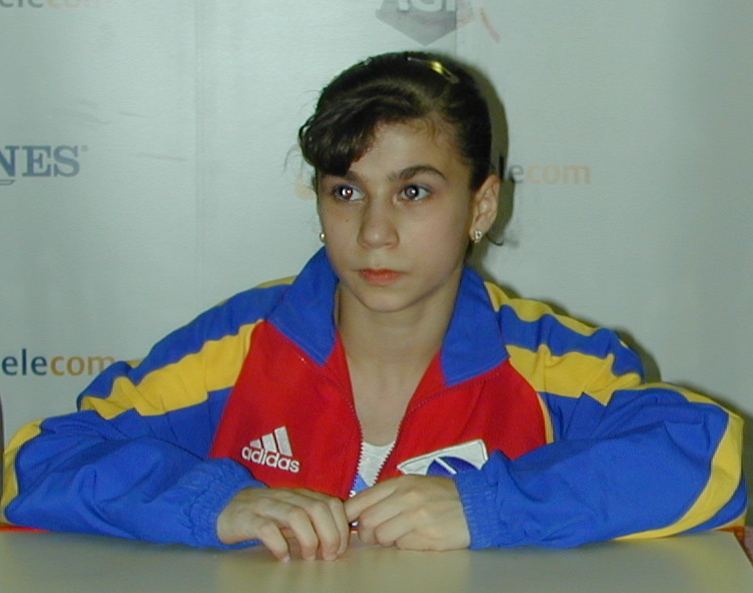
- Press conference at 2000 European Gymnastics Championships in Paris.

Personal information
- Full name: Silvia Alexandra Stroescu
- Born: 8 May 1985 (age 41) Bucharest

Gymnastics career
- Discipline: Women's artistic gymnastics
- Country represented: Romania
- Club: Steaua Bucharest
- Head coach: Octavian Bellu
- Assistant coach: Mariana Bitang
- Former coach: Angela Cacovean
Medal record
Olympic Games
| Gold medal – first place | 2004 Athens | Team all-around |
World Championships
| Gold medal – first place | 2001 Ghent | Team all-around |
European Championships
| Gold medal – first place | 2004 Amsterdam | Team all-around |
Junior European Championships
| Gold medal – first place | 2000 Paris | Floor exercise |
| Gold medal – first place | 2000 Paris | Balance beam (tie) |
| Silver medal – second place | 2000 Paris | All-around |
| Silver medal – second place | 2000 Paris | Team all-around |

Silvia Alexandra Stroescu (born 8 May 1985 in Bucharest, Romania) is a retired Romanian artistic gymnast. She is an Olympic, world, and European gold medalist with the team.

== Early life and career ==
She was one of the most successful junior gymnast of her generation. The major achievements of her junior years were the win of the prestigious Top Gym Trophy (1998) and of four medals (two gold and two silver) at the 2000 Junior European Gymnastics Championships. At these championships she won gold on floor (9.725), tied for gold on balance beam with Sabina Cojocar (9.6), earned a share of the Romanian team's silver medal, and placed second all-around (37.973) behind teammate Sabina Cojocar. Initially, Stroescu did not qualify for the all around event due to the two-per-country rule, having achieved the third qualification score among her teammates. But, in the all around final she replaced Carmen Ionescu who withdrew in her favor.

== Senior career ==
Her senior debut at a major international event was at the 2001 World Championships. Here she contributed to Romania's sixth team title by competing on beam and uneven bars. Individually, she placed eleventh all around and seventh on floor. Later that year she won the mixed pair Swiss Cup event together with Marian Drăgulescu. In the period 2002–2003 she did not make the team for major international events but she competed at the national championships and at some friendly international competitions. After being sidelined for two years, she joined the team for the 2004 European Championships where she contributed to the team title. Just weeks before the 2004 Olympic Games she decided to give up gymnastics being disappointed for not making the Olympic team. However, her disappointment was short lived and she returned to replace injured Aura Munteanu. Stroescu went to Athens and was part of an immensely successful Romanian women's gymnastics team (four golds, one silver and one bronze in six events) that also included Oana Ban, Monica Roșu, Cătălina Ponor, Daniela Sofronie and Alexandra Eremia. Though the team members were less experienced than most of their rivals, the Romanians hit every routine to take the team gold by a comfortable margin. World champions USA were second, and the Russians, led by Svetlana Khorkina, took the bronze.
