= Oksana Lyapina =

Russian artistic gymnast (born 1980)

- 1996 Olympics

Personal information
- Full name: Oksana Vasilyevna Lyapina
- Born: April 28, 1980 (age 46) Armavir, Russian SFSR
- Height: 1.44 m (4 ft 9 in)

Gymnastics career
- Discipline: Women's artistic gymnastics
- Head coach: Leonid Arkayev
- Assistant coach: Tatiana Abramova
Medal record
Representing Russia
Artistic Gymnastics
Olympic Games
Silver medal – second place	1996 Atlanta	Team
European Championships
Silver medal – second place	1996 Birmingham	Team

Oksana Vasilyevna Lyapina (Russian: Оксана Васильевна Ляпина; born 28 April 1980 in Armavir, Russian SFSR) is a Russian artistic gymnast who represented Russia at the 1996 Summer Olympics.

== Career ==
Lyapina competed in the 1995 Junior European Championships and helped her team win gold.

In 1996, she competed at the Olympic Games, along with Rozalia Galiyeva and Svetlana Khorkina. Although first in the compulsory round, they ultimately won silver in the team event. Lyapina fell from the beam.

After the Olympics, Lyapina won some of her first individual medals but an injury prevented her from proper training and competing, so she failed to make the 1997 World Championships.

== Competitive history ==
Year	Event	Team	AA	VT	UB	BB	FX
1996	European Championships	2nd					
1996	Olympic Games	2nd					

Year	Competition description	Location	Apparatus	Rank-Final	Score-Final	Rank-Qualifying	Score-Qualifying
1996	Olympic Games	Atlanta	Team	2	388.404		
1996	Olympic Games	Atlanta	Vault			95	9.575
1996	Olympic Games	Atlanta	Balance beam			34	18.725
1996	Olympic Games	Atlanta	Floor exercise			21	19.337
1996	European Championships	Birmingham	Team	2	115.659		

== See also ==
- List of Olympic female gymnasts for Russia
