= A Little Doll =

1988 Soviet Union film

- Russian: Куколка
- Directed by: Isaak Fridberg
- Written by: Igor Ageev
- Starring: Svetlana Zasypkina; Irina Metlitskaya; Vladimir Menshov; Ervand Arzumanyan; Igor Bugatko
- Cinematography: Vladimir Nakhabtsev
- Music by: David Tukhmanov
- Release date: 1988
- Country: Soviet Union
- Language: Russian

A Little Doll (Russian: Куколка, romanized: Kukolka) is a 1988 Soviet psychological drama film directed by Isaak Fridberg.

The film tells about a young gymnast who is seriously injured, as a result of which she decides to leave the sport. But it’s very difficult for her to come to terms with the idea that she is now just like everyone else.

== Plot ==
Fifteen-year-old Tanya Serebryakova is a world-champion gymnast with a promising career until a severe spine injury during a warm-up ends her aspirations. Despite her pain, her coach pressures her to compete for the sake of the state's prestige, but the injury forces Tanya to retire. She returns to her small-town school as a ninth-grader, where she tries to apply her competitive mindset, honed in the sports world, to the school’s social environment. However, she quickly realizes that her methods alienate her peers. Her physical prowess and foreign possessions earn her a mix of admiration and resentment, yet she struggles to adapt to the different social rules outside gymnastics.

Tanya becomes infatuated with Alexey Panov, a rebellious classmate who is drawn to their liberal young teacher, Elena Mikhaylovna. When Tanya organizes a competing birthday party on the same night as Elena’s, she lures her classmates away, except Panov, who remains loyal to the teacher. A confrontation ensues between Tanya and Panov, where her romantic hopes are dashed as he professes his love to Elena instead. The next day, devastated, Tanya's antagonism leads to a breakdown. She injures herself in the school gym, worsening her paralysis as her physical and emotional worlds collapse. In her final moments at the gym, Tanya quietly pleads for release from her suffering, leaving Panov shattered as he watches her being taken away by ambulance, her athletic dreams irrevocably destroyed.

== Casting ==
Svetlana Zasypkina largely plays herself, under a fictional name Tanya Serebryakova, although Fridberg wrote the script without any knowledge about her. Zasypkina was a competitive gymnast, who trained between ages 6 and 16, and then retired due to a severe back injury sustained during competitions around 1988. Incidentally, Svetlana Zasypkina shares her surname with Maria Zasypkina, another Russian competitive gymnast. Maria also retired due to a back injury sustained during competitions, but later in 2001.

== Cast ==
- Svetlana Zasypkina as Tatyana Serebryakova
- Irina Metlitskaya as Elena Mikhaylovna
- Vladimir Menshov as Vadim Nikolaevich
- Ervand Arzumanyan as Doctor
- Igor Bugatko as Fedor «Khalyava» Khalikov
- Natalya Nazarova as Tatyana's mother
- Irina Petrova
- Aleksey Polovichev as Aleksandr «Shura Pyatietazhnyy» Pyatnov
- Galina Stakhanova as Valentina Nikolaevna
- Mikhail Usachev as Headmaster
