= Elena Dolgopolova =

Russian gymnast

- Full name: Elena Vladimirovna Dolgopolova
- Alternative name: Yelena
- Born: 23 January 1980 (age 46) Volzhsky, Volgograd Oblast
- Height: 149 cm (4 ft 11 in)

Gymnastics career
- Discipline: Women's artistic gymnastics
- Country represented: Russia
- Club: Army Club
- Head coach: T. Khoklova
Medal record
Representing Russia
Olympic Games
Silver medal – second place	1996 Atlanta	Team
World Championships
Silver medal – second place	1997 Lausanne	Team
European Championships
Silver medal – second place	1998 Saint Petersburg	Team
Goodwill Games
Silver medal – second place	1998 New York City	Vault
Summer Universiade
Gold medal – first place	1999 Palma de Mallorca	Team
Bronze medal – third place	1999 Palma de Mallorca	Vault

Elena Vladimirovna Dolgopolova (Russian: Елена Владимировна Долгополова, born 23 January 1980) is a Russian former artistic gymnast who competed in the 1996 Summer Olympics and won a silver medal with the team. She also won team silver medals at the 1997 World Championships and at the 1998 European Championships. Individually, she is the 1998 Goodwill Games vault silver medalist and the 1999 Summer Universiade vault bronze medal.

== Gymnastics career ==
Dolgopolova made her international debut at the 1993 Junior European Championships and finished 13th in the all-around and fifth on the balance beam.

At the 1995 American Cup, she finished sixth in the all-around. She competed at the 1995 World Championships with the Russian team that placed fourth. She did not advance into any individual finals.

Dolgopolova was selected to represent Russia at the 1996 Summer Olympics. After the compulsories, Russia was in first place. However, they were knocked into second place by the United States after the optionals. Dolgopolova did not advance into any of the individual finals.

At the 1997 World Championships, Dolgopolova won a silver medal in the team event. She also finished seventh on vault with a score of 9.331. She competed at the 1998 European Championships, where the Russian team finished second behind Romania. At the 1998 Goodwill Games, she won a silver medal on the vault behind Vanessa Atler with a score of 9.600.

Dolgopolova won a team gold medal at the 1999 Summer Universiade, and she won a bronze medal on the vault. She was in the running for the 2000 Summer Olympics team, but she was left out due to injury.

== Competitive history ==
Competitive history of Elena Dolgopolova
Year	Event	Team	AA	VT	UB	BB	FX
1993
1993	Junior European Championships		13			5	
1995	American Cup		6				
1995	Russian Cup		6				
1995	World Championships	4					
1996	Russian Championships		6				
1996	Olympic Games	2nd place, silver medalist(s)					
1997	Russian Championships		6	1st place, gold medalist(s)			
1997	Russian Cup		4				
1997	World Championships	2nd place, silver medalist(s)		7			
1998	Russian Championships		3rd place, bronze medalist(s)				
1998	European Championships	2nd place, silver medalist(s)					
1998	Goodwill Games			2nd place, silver medalist(s)			
1999	Russian Championships		10				
1999	Russian Cup			5	7	3rd place, bronze medalist(s)	3rd place, bronze medalist(s)
1999	Summer Universiade	1st place, gold medalist(s)	10	3rd place, bronze medalist(s)			
2000	Russian Cup		4				

== See also ==
- List of Olympic female gymnasts for Russia
