= Maria Zasypkina =

Russian artistic gymnast

Personal information
- Born: 9 December 1985 (age 40) Tula, Russia
- Height: 145 cm (4 ft 9 in)
- Weight: 36 kg (79 lb)

Sport
- Sport: Artistic gymnastics
- Coached by: Olga Baranova; Maria Nazarova
Medal record
Representing Russia
World Artistic Gymnastics Championships
| Silver medal – second place | 2001 Ghent | Team |
European Women's Artistic Gymnastics Championships
| Bronze medal – third place | 2000 Paris | Vault |

Maria Yuryevna Zasypkina (Russian: Мария Юрьевна Засыпкина, born 9 December 1985) is a retired Russian artistic gymnast. She won a team silver medal at the 2001 World Championships and an individual bronze at the 2000 European Championships, on the vault. In November 2001 she sustained a severe spine injury and retired from gymnastics.

Zasypkina's mother is an engineer-designer working at Almaz-Antey. Her father is a retired competitive sprint runner. Her elder sister Anna is a retired competitive artistic gymnast.

Zasypkina shares surname with Svetlana Zasypkina, another Russian artistic gymnast who retired in 1988 after a similar spine injury. These events were presented in the film A Little Doll.
