= Gymnastics at the 2000 Summer Olympics – Women's balance beam =

Women's balance beam at the Games of the XXVII Olympiad

Medalists
1st place, gold medalist(s)		Liu Xuan	China
2nd place, silver medalist(s)		Yekaterina Lobaznyuk	Russia
3rd place, bronze medalist(s)		Yelena Produnova	Russia

These are the results of the women's balance beam competition, one of six events for female competitors in artistic gymnastics at the 2000 Summer Olympics in Sydney. The qualification and final rounds took place on September 17 and 25 at the Sydney SuperDome.

== Results ==
=== Qualification ===
Eighty-three gymnasts competed in the balance beam event during the qualification round on September 17. The eight highest scoring gymnasts advanced to the final on September 25. Each country was limited to two competitors in the final.

=== Final ===
Rank	Gymnast	Score
Gold medal	Liu Xuan (CHN)	9.825
Silver medal	Yekaterina Lobaznyuk (RUS)	9.787
Bronze medal	Yelena Produnova (RUS)	9.775
4	Claudia Presacan (ROU)	9.750
5	Tetyana Yarosh (UKR)	9.712
6	Maria Olaru (ROU)	9.700
7	Ling Jie (CHN)	9.675
8	Elise Ray (USA)	9.387
