= Sabina Cojocar =

Romanian artistic gymnast

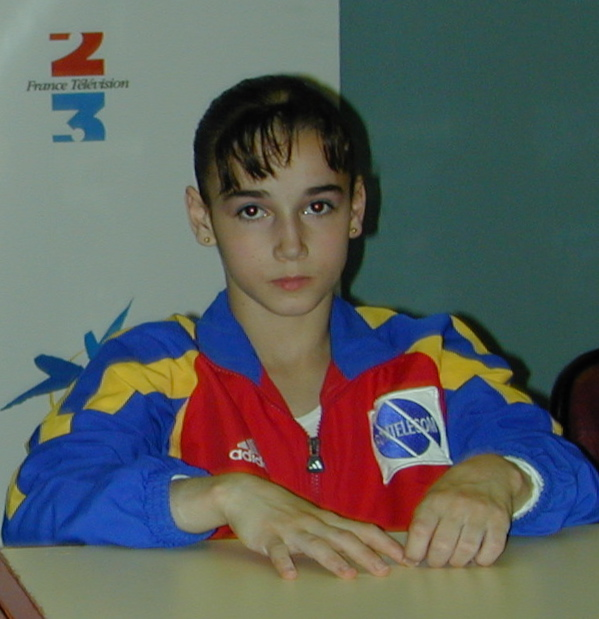
- Cojocar at a press conference at the 2000 European Gymnastics Championships.

Personal information
- Full name: Sabina Carolina Cojocar
- Born: 23 October 1985 (age 40) Sibiu, Romania

Gymnastics career
- Discipline: Women's artistic gymnastics
- Country represented: Romania
- Gym: Deva National Training Center
- Head coach: Octavian Bellu
- Assistant coaches: Mariana Bitang, Lucian Sandu
- Former coaches: Nicolae Buzoianu, Nicoleta Zaharia
- Choreographer: Adriana Pop, Puia Valer, Raluca Bugner
- Retired: 2004
Medal record
World Championships
| Gold medal – first place | 2001 Ghent | Team |
Goodwill Games
| Gold medal – first place | 2001 Brisbane | All-Around |
| Bronze medal – third place | 2001 Brisbane | Floor Exercise |
European Championships (Junior)
| Gold medal – first place | 2000 Paris | All-Around |
| Gold medal – first place | 2000 Paris | Vault |
| Gold medal – first place | 2000 Paris | Balance Beam (tie) |
| Silver medal – second place | 2000 Paris | Floor Exercise |
| Silver medal – second place | 2000 Paris | Team competition |

Sabina Carolina Cojocar (born 23 October 1985) is a Romanian retired international elite artistic gymnast and singer. She became a world gold medalist with the Romanian women's gymnastics team in 2001 and is also a five-time medalist at the 2000 Junior European Gymnastics Championships.

== Early life and career ==
Cojocar was born on 23 October 1985 in Sibiu, Romania. She began gymnastics at the age of three, though she told her coach she was five because she was afraid that he would not accept such a young gymnast. A few years later, she was accepted into the junior national team in Oneşti. After one year, Cojocar was accepted as a member of the senior national team in Deva, under the direct guidance of head coach Octavian Bellu. She made her international debut at the age of fourteen at the 2000 Junior European Championships in Paris, where she won three gold medals (in the all-around, ahead of teammate Silvia Stroescu, and on vault and balance beam) and two silver medals (on floor exercise and with the team). She was touted as the new leader of the young Romanian team and quickly drew international attention, appearing on the cover of the June/July 2000 edition of International Gymnast.

== Senior career ==
In August 2001, Cojocar competed in the Goodwill Games in Brisbane, Australia. She won the all-around title, upsetting more established gymnasts, such as Russia's Svetlana Khorkina, and earned a bronze medal on the floor exercise. Her first major senior event was later in the year at the 2001 World Championships in Ghent, Belgium, where she placed first with the Romanian team, sixth in the all-around, and fourth on beam.

Cojocar underwent shoulder surgery in December 2001. In early 2002, she was one of the gymnasts affected when Bellu decided to send the entire senior national team home from the Deva training center. Cojocar returned to her home club in Sibiu to train and was one of the only gymnasts eventually asked to return to Deva. She competed in the 2002 World Championships, placing fifth on vault and ninth on floor exercise.

== Retirement ==
In 2003, Cojocar retired from gymnastics because of a chronic liver problem. After leaving Deva, she was outspoken about alleged problems on the national team. She said she had been diagnosed with high cholesterol in 2000 and prescribed Zocor, which was not intended for use by children and had experienced several serious side effects. She claimed the she had complained of weakness and of severe muscle and ligament pain, but Bellu forced her to continue training and take the medication. In addition, Cojocar alleged that Bellu was physically abusive to the gymnasts, and that some girls had suffered "terrible beatings".

In 2004, Cojocar began training again in an effort to make the Olympic team, but proved unsuccessful. Afterward, she enrolled at Lucian Blaga University of Sibiu, from which she graduated in 2008 with a degree in physical education. She went on to work as a coach at her former club in Sibiu and at a club in Norway.

Cojocar is also a jewelry designer and has an online shop.

== Music career ==
In 2006, Cojocar released the single "Domine", and in September 2007, she released on Myspace a song she had written herself, "I Don't Wanna Lose U".

Cojocar worked with Mihai Trăistariu, Romania's representative in the 2006 Eurovision Song Contest, to enter the 2008 contest, but she did not pass the national song selection.

== Skills ==
Vault: Double-twisting Yurchenko; round-off, back handspring with full turn on, piked back salto off.

Uneven bars: Kip–cast to handstand (KCH), clear hip to handstand, toe-on to high bar, KCH, giant, hop full, full pirouette, 1½ pirouette, Tkatchev, KCH, overshoot, KCH, sole circle, jump to high bar, KCH, giant, giant, full-in dismount.

Balance beam: Jump to knee mount, back handspring, back handspring, tucked full; switch split leap; Chen; front aerial; full turn; tucked side salto; back handspring, back handspring, triple twist dismount.

Floor exercise: Front handspring, 2½ twist; round-off, back handspring, double pike; double-twisting cat leap, hitchkick; round-off, back handspring, tucked double salto backward with full twist; switch ring leap, double-twisting tuck jump; full turn with leg horizontal; round-off, whip, triple twist.

=== Eponymous skill ===
Cojocar has one eponymous skill listed in the Code of Points.

| Apparatus | Name | Description | Difficulty (Note: Valid for the 2025–2028 Code of Points) |
|---|---|---|---|
| Floor exercise | Cojocar | Salto forward stretched with 2½ turn (900°) | E (0.5) |
