= Yelena Produnova =

Russian artistic gymnast

- Full name: Yelena Sergeyevna Produnova
- Alternative name: Elena
- Born: 15 February 1980 (age 46)
- Height: 150 cm (4 ft 11 in)

Gymnastics career
- Discipline: Women's artistic gymnastics
- Country represented: Russia
- Former coach: Ruslan Lavrov
- Eponymous skills: Produnova (balance beam) and Produnova (vault)
- Retired: 2000
Medal record
Event	1st	2nd	3rd
Olympic Games	0	1	1
World Championships	0	2	2
European Championships	1	1	1
European Team Championships	1	0	0
Summer Universiade	3	1	0
Representing Russia
Olympic Games
Silver medal – second place	2000 Sydney	Team
Bronze medal – third place	2000 Sydney	Balance Beam
World Championships
Silver medal – second place	1997 Lausanne	Team
Silver medal – second place	1999 Tianjin	Team
Bronze medal – third place	1997 Lausanne	All-Around
Bronze medal – third place	1997 Lausanne	Floor Exercise
European Championships
Gold medal – first place	2000 Paris	Team
Silver medal – second place	2000 Paris	Floor Exercise
Bronze medal – third place	2000 Paris	Uneven Bars
European Team Championships
Gold medal – first place	1999 Patras	Team
Summer Universiade
Gold medal – first place	1999 Palma de Mallorca	Team
Gold medal – first place	1999 Palma de Mallorca	Vault
Gold medal – first place	1999 Palma de Mallorca	Balance Beam
Silver medal – second place	1999 Palma de Mallorca	All-Around

Yelena Sergeyevna Produnova, also known as Elena (Russian: Елена Серге́евна Продунова; born 15 February 1980), is a Russian former competitive gymnast. Her senior international career lasted from 1995 to 2000 and earned her multiple world and Olympic medals. One of the most difficult vaults in women's gymnastics, the Produnova, is named after her. With a D-score of 6.0, the Produnova vault is tied with the Biles as having the second highest D-score in women's vault in the 2021–2024 quadrennium.

== Personal life ==
Produnova was born on 15 February 1980. She lives in Rostov-on-Don, Rostov Oblast, Russia. She currently works as a gymnastics coach.

== Gymnastics career ==
=== 1995–96 ===
Produnova's first major senior competition was the 1995 World Championships in Sabae, Fukui, Japan where the Russians finished fourth. Inexperienced, she made little impact on the international scene. A heel injury hampered her chances of being chosen for the 1996 Summer Olympics, and she stayed at home.

=== 1997 ===
At the 1997 World Championships in Lausanne, Russia took team silver behind Romania, and Produnova claimed a pair of bronzes in the all-around and floor exercise.

=== 1998 ===
In 1998, Produnova overcame an ankle injury. That year she also qualified 1st at the 1998 Russian Nationals and finished 5th in the all-around and 3rd on the vault. During the 1998 Cottbus event, Produnova finished 2nd on the vault, 1st on the balance beam, and 2nd on the floor. She was unable to compete at the European Championships because of her injury.

=== 1999 ===
At the 1999 University Games, Produnova won vault and beam titles, and also finished 2nd in the AA and first in the team competition. It was here that she debuted her handspring double front vault, since known as a Produnova. It is among the highest rated vaults in the Code of Points, and as of August 2016 only four other female gymnasts have attempted this vault in competition – Yamilet Peña from Dominican Republic, Fadwa Mahmoud from Egypt, Oksana Chusovitina from Uzbekistan and Dipa Karmakar from India.

The 1999 World Championships in Tianjin, China, Produnova finished fourth in the vault, bars, floor and all-around finals. The overall champion was Maria Olaru. Russia once again finished second to Romania.

=== 2000 ===
The 2000 European Championships saw Russia, with the help of Produnova, beat Romania for gold for the first time ever. Produnova also took a bronze on beam, behind teammate Svetlana Khorkina, and a silver on floor behind Ludivine Furnon of France. These results and her victory in the Russian national championships gained Produnova a place on the team for the 2000 Summer Olympics in Sydney.

In the preliminary round at the Olympics, the Russians were dominant. The quartet of Produnova, Khorkina, Yekaterina Lobaznyuk and world vault champion Elena Zamolodchikova all qualified for multiple finals. Though the Romanians were world champions, the Russians had beaten them earlier in the year.

Four of Russia's six gymnasts fell in the team final; only the two least known members of the team performed without major errors. Produnova sat down only one of two vaults and her score was dropped (at this time, teams could drop the lowest score on each apparatus therefore one fall was not too drastic). After her one error, she recorded the team's highest scores on beam and bars. The same principle applied to Khorkina's fall from bars since the score did not have to count towards the team title, the mistake did not have to cost them the gold. Both Zamolodchikova and Lobaznyuk fell on the beam, and it was not until Produnova's solid performance that the Russians showed a clean routine. The Russians were the top scoring team on floor, but it was not enough for the gold. Romania were victorious by a margin of only two tenths. Produnova and Khorkina both removed their silver medals as they walked off the podium.

Produnova had qualified for the all-around finals, where she was a legitimate medal threat. However, she had broken her foot during the Olympics and had to withdraw. Teammate Elena Zamolodchikova took her place. Two of the three Russians fell, and none managed to make the podium.

Produnova competed in both of the finals to which she had qualified, bars and beam. A mistake kept her out of the medals on bars. She hit her beam routine solidly and stuck her difficult double front dismount, winning a bronze medal, behind Liu Xuan of China and Lobaznyuk.

Sydney was Produnova's last major competition.

== Eponymous skills ==
Produnova currently has three eponymous skills listed in the Code of Points.

Apparatus	Name	Description	Code of Points (Note: Valid for the 2025-2028 Code of Points)
Vault	Produnova	Handspring forward on - tucked double salto forward off	6.0
Balance beam	Produnova	Jump forward with ½ twist (180°) – salto backward piked	F (0.6)
Floor exercise	Produnova	Tour jeté with additional ½ turn (180°), landing on one or both feet, or in split sit position	C (0.3)

== Floor music ==
Produnova's floor exercise music at the 2000 Summer Olympics was "The Ride" from James Horner's The Mask of Zorro soundtrack. "The Ride" is the third track of the soundtrack CD, before and after two songs with "Elena" in their names.

== Competitive history ==
Year	Event	Team	AA	VT	UB	BB	FX
1995	World Championships	4th					
1997	World Championships	2nd	3rd			8th	3rd
1998	World Cup Final			6th	6th		6th
1999	World Championships	2nd	4th	4th	4th		4th
2000	European Championships	1st		4th	3rd		2nd
2000	Olympic Games	2nd	WD		7th	3rd	

Year	Competition description	Location	Apparatus	Rank-Final	Score-Final	Rank-Qualifying	Score-Qualifying
2000	Olympic Games	Sydney	Team	2	154.403	1	154.874
2000	Olympic Games	Sydney	All-around	WD		5	38.529
2000	Olympic Games	Sydney	Vault			25	9.368
2000	Olympic Games	Sydney	Uneven bars	7	9.650	5	9.762
2000	Olympic Games	Sydney	Balance beam	3	9.775	5	9.762
2000	Olympic Games	Sydney	Floor exercise			9	9.637
2000	European Championships	Paris	Team	1	115.760		
2000	European Championships	Paris	All-around			5	38.318
2000	European Championships	Paris	Vault	4	9.543	4	9.531
2000	European Championships	Paris	Uneven bars	3	9.775	3	9.762
2000	European Championships	Paris	Balance beam			18	9.200
2000	European Championships	Paris	Floor exercise	2	9.812	1	9.825
1999	World Championships	Tianjin	Team	2	153.209	2	153.576
1999	World Championships	Tianjin	All-around	4	38.673	6	38.429
1999	World Championships	Tianjin	Vault	4	9.587	6	9.593
1999	World Championships	Tianjin	Uneven bars	4	9.750	2	9.787
1999	World Championships	Tianjin	Balance beam			30	9.412
1999	World Championships	Tianjin	Floor exercise	4	9.737	13	9.637
1998	World Cup Final	Sabae	Vault	6	9.281		
1998	World Cup Final	Sabae	Uneven bars	6	9.375		
1998	World Cup Final	Sabae	Floor exercise	6	8.737		
1997	World Championships	Lausanne	Team	2	153.197	1	153.401
1997	World Championships	Lausanne	All-around	3	38.549	2	38.329
1997	World Championships	Lausanne	Vault			11	9.543
1997	World Championships	Lausanne	Uneven bars			12	9.437
1997	World Championships	Lausanne	Balance beam	8	9.412	4	9.687
1997	World Championships	Lausanne	Floor exercise	3	9.775	7	9.662
1995	World Championships	Sabae	Team	4	384.689		
1995	World Championships	Sabae	Balance beam			44	18.437
1995	World Championships	Sabae	Floor exercise			20	19.362

== See also ==
- List of Olympic female gymnasts for Russia
