= Gymnastics at the 2000 Summer Olympics – Women's floor =

Women's floor at the Games of the XXVII Olympiad

Medalists
1st place, gold medalist(s)		Elena Zamolodchikova	Russia
2nd place, silver medalist(s)		Svetlana Khorkina	Russia
3rd place, bronze medalist(s)		Simona Amânar	Romania

These are the results of the women's floor competition, one of six events for female competitors in artistic gymnastics at the 2000 Summer Olympics in Sydney. The qualification and final rounds took place on September 17 and 25 at the Sydney SuperDome.

== Results ==
=== Qualification ===
Eighty-three gymnasts competed in the floor event during the qualification round on September 17. The eight highest scoring gymnasts advanced to the final on September 25. Each country was limited to two competitors in the final.

=== Final ===
Rank	Gymnast	Score
Gold medal	Elena Zamolodchikova (RUS)	9.850
Silver medal	Svetlana Khorkina (RUS)	9.812
Bronze medal	Simona Amânar (ROU)	9.712
4	Esther Moya (ESP)	9.700
5	Yang Yun (CHN)	9.637
6	Andreea Răducan (ROU)	9.275
7	Lisa Skinner (AUS)	9.012

Note: Dong Fangxiao (CHN) originally placed sixth with 9.537, but she was disqualified in 2010 after it was discovered that she was underage when she competed.
