= Yekaterina Lobaznyuk =

Russian gymnast

Ekaterina Lobaznyuk
- Born: June 10, 1983 (age 43) Fergana, Uzbek SSR, Soviet Union
- Height: 143 cm (4 ft 8 in)

Gymnastics career
- Discipline: Women's artistic gymnastics
- Country represented: Russia
- Head coach: Leonid Arkayev
- Former coaches: Valery Dianov; Liudmila Lobaznyuk
- Music: Hava Nagila
- Eponymous skills: Balance beam: Arabian salto tucked (take-off bwd with 1/2 twist [180°], salto fwd)
- Retired: 2002
Medal record
Event	1st	2nd	3rd
Olympic Games	0	2	1
World Championships	0	1	0
European Championships	1	0	0
Representing Russia
Olympic Games
Silver medal – second place	2000 Sydney	Team
Silver medal – second place	2000 Sydney	Balance Beam
Bronze medal – third place	2000 Sydney	Vault
World Championships
Silver medal – second place	1999 Tianjin	Team
European Championships
Gold medal – first place	2000 Paris	Team

Ekaterina Vladimirovna Lobaznyuk (Russian: Екатерина Владимировна Лобазнюк; born June 10, 1983, in Fergana, Uzbek SSR, USSR) is a former Olympic gymnast who competed for Russia in the 2000 Olympic Games in Sydney, Australia, winning three medals. Her name is sometimes written Ekaterina Lobazniouk.

== Early life ==
The second daughter of a gymnastics coach (who is also a former gymnast) and a sports school director, Lobaznyuk grew up in Uzbekistan amid the strife and turbulence of the 1980s. She began her gymnastics career at the young age of six, when her mother brought her to a gym in Fergana. In the 1990s, after the USSR fell apart, the Lobaznyuk family fled to Tashkent due to violence and riots in the Fergana Valley area. The family attempted to join a circus there, but failed. Help came in 1994 thanks to her grandmother, living in Russia at the time; the Lobaznyuks eventually settled in Rubtsovsk, a city of some 170,000 people located in southwestern Siberia.

It was in Rubtsovsk that Lobaznyuk met her future coach, Valery Fyodotovich Dianov, and the two quickly became a team.

== Gymnastics career ==
=== National debut ===
Lobaznyuk made her debut as a junior elite gymnast in a children's meet sometime prior to 1996. Although she fell eleven times during the meet, Russian National Team coach Leonid Arkayev was very impressed with her. In 1996 she placed first in the all-around and first on floor exercise at the Russian Youth Championships (in the Candidate for Master of Sport category) and the next year won four gold and one silver medal at the Russian Cup's junior competition. Arkayev subsequently invited her to the national team's training center, located at Round Lake.

=== National team member ===
As a member of Russia's national team, Lobaznyuk attracted attention due to her well-choreographed routines and her spunky personality. In 1997 she won the all-around title at the Charleroi TopGym meet in Belgium, as well as finishing fifth in the all-around (with two additional titles in vault and balance beam) at the International Junior Tournament in Japan. It was at this meet in Japan that she gained the attention of fans worldwide with her appearance and her floor exercise, choreographed to the music "Hava Nagila".

In 1998, Lobaznyuk broke her right arm as a result of a fall off her least favorite event, the uneven bars, and missed the two biggest junior events of the year, the Junior European Championships and World Youth Games. She healed completely enough at the end of the year to win over Ukrainian gymnast Viktoria Karpenko at the Acapulco Cup in Mexico.

=== Rise to fame at 1999 Worlds ===
1999 and 2000 were the best years of Lobaznyuk's competitive career. She was an integral part of the 1999 World Championships team from Russia that won a silver medal, as she picked up the most points overall for her team in the team final. Dianov was thrilled, saying "She performed wonderfully". Once again, she garnered a lot of attention and many more fans, partly due to ESPN's broadcast of the competition. Without her impressive performance at the World Gymnastics Championships, she might not have made it to the Olympics the next year.

Sydney, Australia was the site of the 2000 Olympic Games, and the location of the highest point in Lobaznyuk's career. She was also perhaps the top gymnast on the Olympic team, surpassing Svetlana Khorkina and Elena Zamolodchikova, the best known members of the team at the time. She won a pair of silver medals (on the beam and in the team final) and a bronze on the vault. After Zamolodchikova fell off the balance beam in the team final, Lobaznyuk wanted to get a 10.0 SV (start value) so she included a move not originally in her beam routine and promptly fell off the side of the beam. Dianov remarked afterwards, "It was a noble impulse and so it was impossible to rebuke her for it". In the all-around final, Lobaznyuk stepped out of bounds on her floor routine and misstepped on beam, resulting in a fifth-place result (bumped to fourth following the disqualification of Romania's Andreea Răducan).

=== Injuries ===
At the 2001 Russian Cup, while performing one of her signature Yurchenko vaults, Lobaznyuk landed very hard on the mat and collapsed in pain; she had to be picked up and carried off by one of her coaches. It was revealed later that she had torn the ACL and MCL in her right knee, and surgery would be needed, which would sideline her for the remainder of the year. She had surgery in Moscow, Russia, on August 26th. She had a further surgery performed by Daan du Plessis in Johannesburg, South Africa, in January 2002, to remove pieces of bone from her knee.

The next month, Lobaznyuk attempted a comeback at the Russian National Championships, performing only on beam and floor exercise while her surgically repaired knee continued to heal. She did OK in the eyes of national team coaches, but not well enough to rejoin the team, as other, younger gymnasts were coming along to take her place. With very little chance to come back for her country, Lobaznyuk decided to retire from competition shortly thereafter.

== Post-gymnastics life ==
Lobaznyuk now resides in Langley, British Columbia, Canada where she trains as a competitive coach alongside her mother Ludmila, who herself is a coach at the Langley Gymnastics Foundation. She is married and has a son named Alexei.

== Eponymous skill ==
Apparatus	Name	Description	Difficulty (Note: Valid for the 2025–2028 Code of Points)	Added to the Code of Points
Balance beam	Lobaznyuk	Arabian salto tucked (take-off bwd with 1/2 twist [180°], salto fwd)	F (0.6)	1999 World Championships

== Competitive history ==
Year	Event	Team	AA	VT	UB	BB	FX
1999	World Championships	2nd					
2000	European Championships	1st					
2000	Olympic Games	2nd	4th	3rd		2nd	

Year	Competition Description	Location	Apparatus	Rank-Final	Score-Final	Rank-Qualifying	Score-Qualifying
2000	Olympic Games	Sydney	Team	2	154.403	1	154.874
2000	Olympic Games	Sydney	All-Around	4	38.393	4	38.686
2000	Olympic Games	Sydney	Vault	3	9.674	6	9.637
2000	Olympic Games	Sydney	Uneven Bars			16	9.675
2000	Olympic Games	Sydney	Balance Beam	2	9.787	3	9.762
2000	Olympic Games	Sydney	Floor Exercise			12	9.612
2000	European Championships	Paris	Team	1	115.760		
1999	World Championships	Tianjin	Team	2	153.209	2	153.576
1999	World Championships	Tianjin	All-Around			15	37.787
1999	World Championships	Tianjin	Vault			23	9.400
1999	World Championships	Tianjin	Uneven Bars			10	9.612
1999	World Championships	Tianjin	Balance Beam			37	9.325
1999	World Championships	Tianjin	Floor Exercise			33	9.450

== See also ==
- List of Olympic female gymnasts for Russia
