= Leonid Arkayev =

Russian gymnast (1940–2026)

- Леонид Аркаев
- Born: 3 June 1940 Moscow, Russian SFSR, Soviet Union
- Died: 6 November 2026 (aged 86) Moscow, Russia

Gymnastics career
- Discipline: Men's artistic gymnastics

Leonid Yakovlevich Arkayev (Russian: Леонид Яковлевич Аркаев; 3 June 1940 – 6 November 2026) was a Russian gymnast and coach. He was inducted into the International Gymnastics Hall of Fame in 2011.

== Biography ==
Arkayev was born in Moscow on 3 June 1940.

From 1972 he coached the Soviet men's national team and from 1992 to 2004 the Russian men's and women's teams. It is estimated Soviet and Russian gymnasts won more than 400 medals under his leadership.

Arkayev died in Moscow on 6 November 2026, at the age of 86.
