= Anna Chepeleva =

Russian artistic gymnast

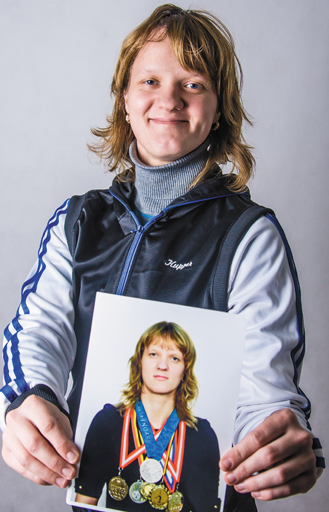

Personal information
- Full name: Anna Sergeyevna Chepeleva
- Born: July 26, 1984 (age 42) Volzhsky, Volgograd Oblast

Gymnastics career
- Discipline: Women's artistic gymnastics
- Country represented: Russia
Medal record
Representing Russia
Olympic Games
Silver medal – second place	2000 Sydney	Team

Anna Sergeyevna Chepeleva (Russian: Анна Сергеевна Чепелева, born on June 26, 1984) is a former Olympic gymnast at the 2000 Olympic Games. She won a silver medal with the Russian team.

== Competitive history ==
Year	Event	Team	AA	VT	UB	BB	FX
2000	Olympic Games	2nd					

Year	Competition Description	Location	Apparatus	Rank-Final	Score-Final	Rank-Qualifying	Score-Qualifying
2000	Olympic Games	Sydney	Team	2	154.403	1	154.874
2000	Olympic Games	Sydney	Vault			14	9.474
2000	Olympic Games	Sydney	Floor Exercise			27	9.425

== See also ==
- List of Olympic female gymnasts for Russia
