= Anastasiya Kolesnikova =

Russian artistic gymnast

- Born: 10 June 1983 (age 43) Kazan

Gymnastics career
- Discipline: Women's artistic gymnastics
- Country represented: Russia
Medal record
Representing Russia
Olympic Games
Silver medal – second place	2000 Sydney	Team

Anastasiya Nikolayevna Kolesnikova (Russian: Анастаси́я Никола́евна Коле́сникова) (born 6 March 1984) is a former Olympic gymnast who competed for Russia in the 2000 Olympic Games in Sydney, Australia, winning a silver medal.

== Eponymous skill ==
Kolesnikova has one eponymous skill listed in the Code of Points.

Apparatus	Name	Description	Difficulty (Note: Valid for the 2025–2028 Code of Points)
Balance beam	Kolesnikova	Flic-flac from side position with ½ turn (180°) to side handstand lower to optional end position	D (0.4)

== Competitive history ==
Year	Event	Team	AA	VT	UB	BB	FX
2000	Olympic Games	2nd					

Year	Competition Description	Location	Apparatus	Rank-Final	Score-Final	Rank-Qualifying	Score-Qualifying
2000	Olympic Games	Sydney	Team	2	154.403	1	154.874
2000	Olympic Games	Sydney	Uneven Bars			25	9.625
2000	Olympic Games	Sydney	Balance Beam			20	9.587

== See also ==
- List of Olympic female gymnasts for Russia
