= Esther Moya =

Spanish artistic gymnast (born 1984)

- Full name: Esther Moya Salvador
- Born: 31 July 1984 (age 42) Barcelona, Spain

Gymnastics career
- Discipline: Women's artistic gymnastics
- Country represented: Spain
- Head coach: Jesus Carballo

Esther Moya Salvador (Note: In this Spanish name, the first or paternal surname is Moya and the second or maternal family name is Salvador.) (born 31 July 1984) is a former Spanish gymnast. She was notably strong on two events: the floor exercise and vault. She participated in two world championships and the 2000 Sydney Olympics. Her best event was vault.

== Career ==
=== Junior career ===
Moya made the Spanish team to compete at the 1998 Junior European Championships. Here she placed 5th with both the team and in the individual all-around final. She also won a bronze medal on vault.

=== Senior career ===
At the 1999 World Artistic Gymnastics Championships, Moya qualified to the individual all-around final and placed tenth (after the nullification of Dong Fangxio's results). In 2000, Moya competed at the 2000 European Championships in Paris. Here, Moya and the Spanish team placed 4th in the team final. Maya also narrowly placed 4th in the all-around final but won a bronze medal in the vault event final. At the 2000 Summer Olympics in Sydney, Australia, she helped lead the Spanish team to a fifth place qualification score, a high enough score to advance to finals. The team retained its place in 5th position in team finals, its best team final performance in history for Spanish women's artistic gymnastics. Later, after it was revealed China had falsified the age of one of their competitors at the games, the Spanish team moved up to a fourth-place finish for the team final. Moya also qualified to the individual all-around, vault, and floor exercise finals. Moya ended up 9th in the all-around final and 4th in both the vault and floor exercise finals, narrowly missing medals in those events.

The year after the Olympics, Moya helped the Spanish team at the 2001 World Artistic Gymnastics Championships finish again in fourth during the team final. She also qualified to the balance beam final and placed 7th.

== Floor Music ==
2000: "I Got a Girl"/"Mambo No. 5" by Lou Bega
