= Svetlana Khorkina =

Russian artistic gymnast (born 1979)

- Светлана Хоркина
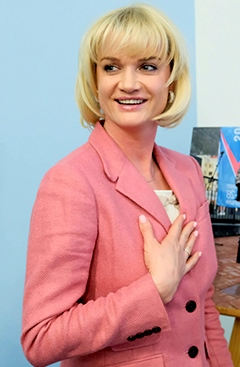
- Khorkina in 2017

Personal information
- Full name: Svetlana Vasilyevna Khorkina
- Nickname: Sveta
- Born: 19 January 1979 (age 47) Belgorod, Russian SFSR, USSR
- Height: 165 cm (5 ft 5 in)

Gymnastics career
- Discipline: Women's artistic gymnastics
- Country represented: Russia; (1994–2004)
- Head coach: Boris Vasilevich Pilkin
- Assistant coach: Anna Pilina
- Retired: 23 August 2004
- Awards: Longines Prize for Elegance (1999)
Medal record
Event	1st	2nd	3rd
Olympic Games	2	4	1
World Championships	9	8	3
World Cup Final	0	1	0
Goodwill Games	4	2	1
European Championships	13	5	2
European Team Championships	2	0	0
Total	30	20	7
Event	1st	2nd	3rd
All-Around (OG/WC)	3	2	0
Uneven Bars (OG/WC)	7	1	0
Balance Beam (OG/WC)	0	1	0
Vault (OG/WC)	1	1	0
Floor Exercise (OG/WC)	0	2	2
Total	11	7	2
Women's artistic gymnastics
Representing Russia
Olympic Games
Gold medal – first place	1996 Atlanta	Uneven Bars
Gold medal – first place	2000 Sydney	Uneven Bars
Silver medal – second place	1996 Atlanta	Team
Silver medal – second place	2000 Sydney	Team
Silver medal – second place	2000 Sydney	Floor Exercise
Silver medal – second place	2004 Athens	All-Around
Bronze medal – third place	2004 Athens	Team
World Championships
Gold medal – first place	1995 Sabae	Uneven Bars
Gold medal – first place	1996 San Juan	Uneven Bars
Gold medal – first place	1997 Lausanne	All-Around
Gold medal – first place	1997 Lausanne	Uneven Bars
Gold medal – first place	1999 Tianjin	Uneven Bars
Gold medal – first place	2001 Ghent	Vault
Gold medal – first place	2001 Ghent	All-Around
Gold medal – first place	2001 Ghent	Uneven Bars
Gold medal – first place	2003 Anaheim	All-Around
Silver medal – second place	1994 Brisbane	Vault
Silver medal – second place	1994 Brisbane	Uneven Bars
Silver medal – second place	1995 Sabae	All-Around
Silver medal – second place	1997 Lausanne	Team
Silver medal – second place	1997 Lausanne	Balance Beam
Silver medal – second place	1997 Lausanne	Floor Exercise
Silver medal – second place	1999 Tianjin	Team
Silver medal – second place	2001 Ghent	Team
Bronze medal – third place	1994 Dortmund	Team
Bronze medal – third place	1999 Tianjin	Floor Exercise
Bronze medal – third place	2001 Ghent	Floor Exercise
World Cup Final
Silver medal – second place	1998 Sabae	Uneven Bars
Goodwill Games
Gold medal – first place	1994 St Petersburg	Team
Gold medal – first place	1994 St Petersburg	Uneven Bars
Gold medal – first place	1998 New York	Uneven Bars
Gold medal – first place	2001 Brisbane	Uneven Bars
Silver medal – second place	2001 Brisbane	All-Around
Silver medal – second place	2001 Brisbane	Floor Exercise
Bronze medal – third place	1994 St Petersburg	Vault
European Championships
Gold medal – first place	1994 Stockholm	Uneven Bars
Gold medal – first place	1996 Birmingham	Uneven Bars
Gold medal – first place	1998 St. Petersburg	All-Around
Gold medal – first place	1998 St. Petersburg	Uneven Bars
Gold medal – first place	1998 St. Petersburg	Floor Exercise
Gold medal – first place	2000 Paris	Team
Gold medal – first place	2000 Paris	All-Around
Gold medal – first place	2000 Paris	Uneven Bars
Gold medal – first place	2000 Paris	Balance Beam
Gold medal – first place	2002 Patras	Team
Gold medal – first place	2002 Patras	All-Around
Gold medal – first place	2002 Patras	Uneven Bars
Gold medal – first place	2004 Amsterdam	Uneven Bars
Silver medal – second place	1994 Stockholm	Team
Silver medal – second place	1994 Stockholm	All-Around
Silver medal – second place	1996 Birmingham	Team
Silver medal – second place	1998 St. Petersburg	Team
Silver medal – second place	2002 Patras	Balance Beam
Bronze medal – third place	2004 Amsterdam	Team
Bronze medal – third place	2004 Amsterdam	Balance Beam
European Team Championships
Gold medal – first place	1999 Patras	Team
Gold medal – first place	2003 Moscow	Team

Svetlana Vasilyevna Khorkina (Russian: Светлана Васильевна Хоркина; born 19 January 1979) is a retired Russian artistic gymnast. She competed in three Summer Olympics: 1996 Summer Olympics, 2000 Summer Olympics, and 2004 Summer Olympics. During her career, Khorkina won seven Olympic medals and twenty World Championship medals. Over time, she medaled in every event at the World Artistic Gymnastics Championships. She was also the first gymnast to win three all-around titles at the World Championships and only the second female artistic gymnast ever, after Nadia Comăneci, to win three European All-Around titles. Khorkina is regarded as one of the most successful female gymnasts on record.

At the opening ceremony of the 2019 Winter Universiade she lit the fire, together with bandy player Sergey Lomanov.

== Senior career ==
=== 1994–1996 ===
In April 1994, Khorkina competed at the World Championships in Brisbane, Australia. She placed ninth in the all around with a score of 38.805. In the event finals, she placed second on vault scoring 9.800, second on uneven bars scoring 9.875, and eighth on floor scoring 8.487. In November 1994, Khorkina competed at the World Team Championships in Dortmund, Germany. She contributed an all-around score of 39.450 toward the Russian team's third-place finish.

In October 1995, Khorkina competed at the World Championships in Sabae, Japan. In the all around final, she placed second with a score of 39.130. In the event finals, she placed fifth on vault scoring 9.618 and first on uneven bars scoring 9.900. In April 1996, Khorkina competed at the World Championships in San Juan, Puerto Rico. She placed fifth on vault scoring 9.637 and first on uneven bars scoring 9.787. In May 1996, Khorkina competed at the European Championships in Birmingham, United Kingdom. She helped Russia win the silver medal in the team final and came sixth in the all around final with a score of 38.549. In the event finals, she placed fourth on vault scoring 9.725 and first on uneven bars scoring 9.825.

=== Atlanta Olympics (1996) ===
Khorkina competed at the 1996 Summer Olympics in Atlanta, United States. In the team final, she contributed a combined compulsory and optional score of 77.648 toward the Russian team's second-place finish. In the all-around final, she fell on the uneven bars in the final rotation and finished fifteenth in the standings with a total score of 38.455. Three days later, Khorkina redeemed herself by winning the gold medal in the uneven bars final with a score of 9.850.

=== 1997–2000 ===
In September 1997, Khorkina competed at the World Championships in Lausanne, Switzerland. She helped Russia place second in the team final and individually she won the all around final with a score of 38.636. In event finals, she placed eighth on vault scoring 4.537, first on uneven bars scoring 9.875, second on balance beam scoring 9.787, and second on floor scoring 9.800. In November 1997, Khorkina caused a scandal by posing for the Russian edition of Playboy. She said, "I changed people's attitudes. It's very good to be sexy. My career made it clear that tall girls can do incredible things. I opened the way. Now I'm famous all over the world".

In May 1998, Khorkina competed at the European Championships in St. Petersburg, Russia. She helped the Russian team finish second and individually she won the all around final with a score of 38.624. In event finals, she placed first on uneven bars scoring 9.900 and first on floor scoring 9.787.

In October 1999, Khorkina competed at the World Championships in Tianjin, China. She helped Russia place second in the team final and individually she placed twelfth in the all around final with a score of 37.611. In event finals, she placed first on uneven bars scoring 9.837 and third on floor scoring 9.787. In May 2000, Khorkina competed at the European Championships in Paris, France. She helped the Russian team win the gold medal and individually she won the all around final with a score of 38.749. In event finals, she placed first on uneven bars scoring 9.837 and first on balance beam scoring 9.837.

==== Sydney Olympics (2000) ====
In September, Khorkina competed at the 2000 Summer Olympics in Sydney, Australia. In qualifications, the Russian team placed first and individually Khorkina placed first in the all around with a score of 39.005. She also qualified for the vault, uneven bars, and floor event finals. In the team final, Khorkina contributed an all-around score of 38.261 toward the Russian team's second-place finish.

In the all around final, Khorkina placed tenth with a score of 37.929. During the final the vault was set five centimeters lower than it should have been, causing many gymnasts, including Khorkina, to fall. Subsequently, she fell on the uneven bars for unrelated reasons. In the third rotation the vault height was corrected. The gymnasts who had already vaulted were invited to vault again, but Khorkina refused, knowing that it would not put her in medal contention.

In the event finals, Khorkina gave up her spot in the vault final to teammate, Elena Zamolodchikova, who went on to win the gold medal. Khorkina said, "I thought she could win the gold. I'm glad I could give her that opportunity." She then won the uneven bars final with a score of 9.862. She became the second gymnast to win the event in two consecutive Olympic games after Polina Astakhova who won in 1960 and 1964. Commenting on the all-around final, Khorkina said, "If I didn't get over the disappointment, I wouldn't be Khorkina. I wouldn't be standing here with the gold medal. It still hurts a lot. It was cruel to all the participants, to vault on a nonstandard height. It's quite possible to get killed. The five centimeters could decide the future of a sportsperson. But I was fortunate to have many people to help me get through it. Tomorrow, I will dance for Russia. I will leave what happened on the vault far behind me, like the North Pole." She then won the silver medal in the floor final with a score of 9.812.

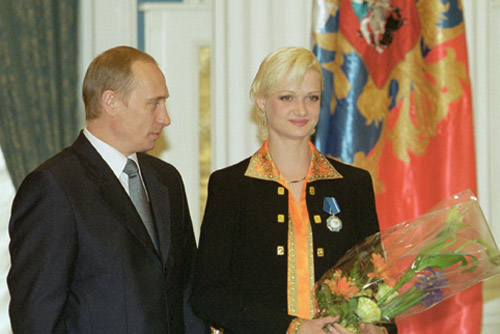
Khorkina received the Order of Honour from Russian president Vladimir Putin on 8 June 2001.

=== 2001–2004 ===
In September 2001, Khorkina captured the gold medal on the uneven bars in the 2001 Goodwill Games. In October 2001, she competed at the World Championships in Ghent, Belgium. She helped the Russian team win the silver medal and individually she won the all around final with a score of 37.617. In event finals, she placed first on vault scoring 9.412, first on uneven bars scoring 9.437, and third on floor scoring 9.375. In April 2002, Khorkina competed at the European Championships in Patras, Greece. She helped Russia win the first place in the team competition and individually she won the all around competition with a score of 37.592. In event finals, she placed first on uneven bars scoring 9.550, second on balance beam scoring 9.262, and fifth on floor scoring 9.075.

In November 2002, Khorkina competed at the World Championships in Debrecen, Hungary. She placed seventh on uneven bars scoring 7.387 and fourth on balance beam scoring 9.462.

In March 2003, Khorkina competed at the World Cup event in Thessaloniki, Greece. She placed first on uneven bars scoring 9.425. In August 2003, Khorkina competed at the World Championships in Anaheim, United States. She won the all around final for with a score of 38.124 This was the first time a gymnast had won three World all around titles. In November 2003, Khorkina competed at the World Cup event in Stuttgart, Germany. She placed third on vault scoring 9.268, third on uneven bars scoring 9.425, third on balance beam scoring 9.225, and second on floor scoring 9.187.

At the end of April 2004, Khorkina competed at the European Championships in Amsterdam, the Netherlands. She helped the Russian team place third and individually she placed fourth in the all around final with a score of 36.848. In event finals, she placed first on uneven bars scoring 9.662, third on balance beam scoring 9.325, and seventh on floor scoring 9.112.

==== Athens Olympics (2004) ====
In August, Khorkina competed at the 2004 Summer Olympics in Athens, Greece. In the team final, she contributed an all around score of 38.062 toward the Russian team's third-place finish. In the all around final, she won the silver medal with a score of 38.211.

Khorkina qualified in first place for the Uneven Bars Final, with a score of 9.750. However, she placed eighth in the uneven bars final with a score of 8.925 after turning late on a pirouette and coming off the apparatus. This meant that she failed to defend her two-time Olympic uneven bars title from the 1996 and 2000 Summer Olympics with the title going to Émilie Le Pennec of France instead.

== Eponymous skills ==
Khorkina has five eponymous skills that are currently listed in the Code of Points (CoP). Prior to the 2006 Code of Points, she held the record of having the most eponyms at eight.

Apparatus	Name	Description	Difficulty (Note: Valid for the 2025–2028 Code of Points)	Notes
Vault	Khorkina	Yurchenko ½ on into ½ twist to back pike off	—N/a	Not listed since the 2006-2008 CoP
Vault	Khorkina II	Round-off flic-flac with ½ turn (180°) on into tucked salto forward with 1½ twist (540°) off	4.8	
Uneven Bars	Khorkina	Back uprise and straddle flight over high bar with ½ turn to hang	—N/a	
Uneven Bars	Khorkina II	Сlear hip circle through handstand with ½ turn (180°) in flight to hang on high bar	E (0.5)	Also colloquially called a "Shaposh ½"
Uneven Bars	Chow-Khorkina III or Khorkina III-Chow	Stalder backwards with 1½ turn	—N/a	Also named after Amy Chow at 1996 Games; Not listed since the 2006-2008 CoP
Balance Beam	Khorkina	Gainer flic-flac with minimum ¾ turn (270°) before hand support	D (0.4)	
Balance Beam	Khorkina II	Gainer salto back stretched with 2½ turn (900°) to side of beam	D (0.4)	
Floor Exercise	Khorkina	Jump with 1½ twist on horizontal plane to land in front support	—N/a	Not listed since the 2006-2008 CoP

== Personal life ==
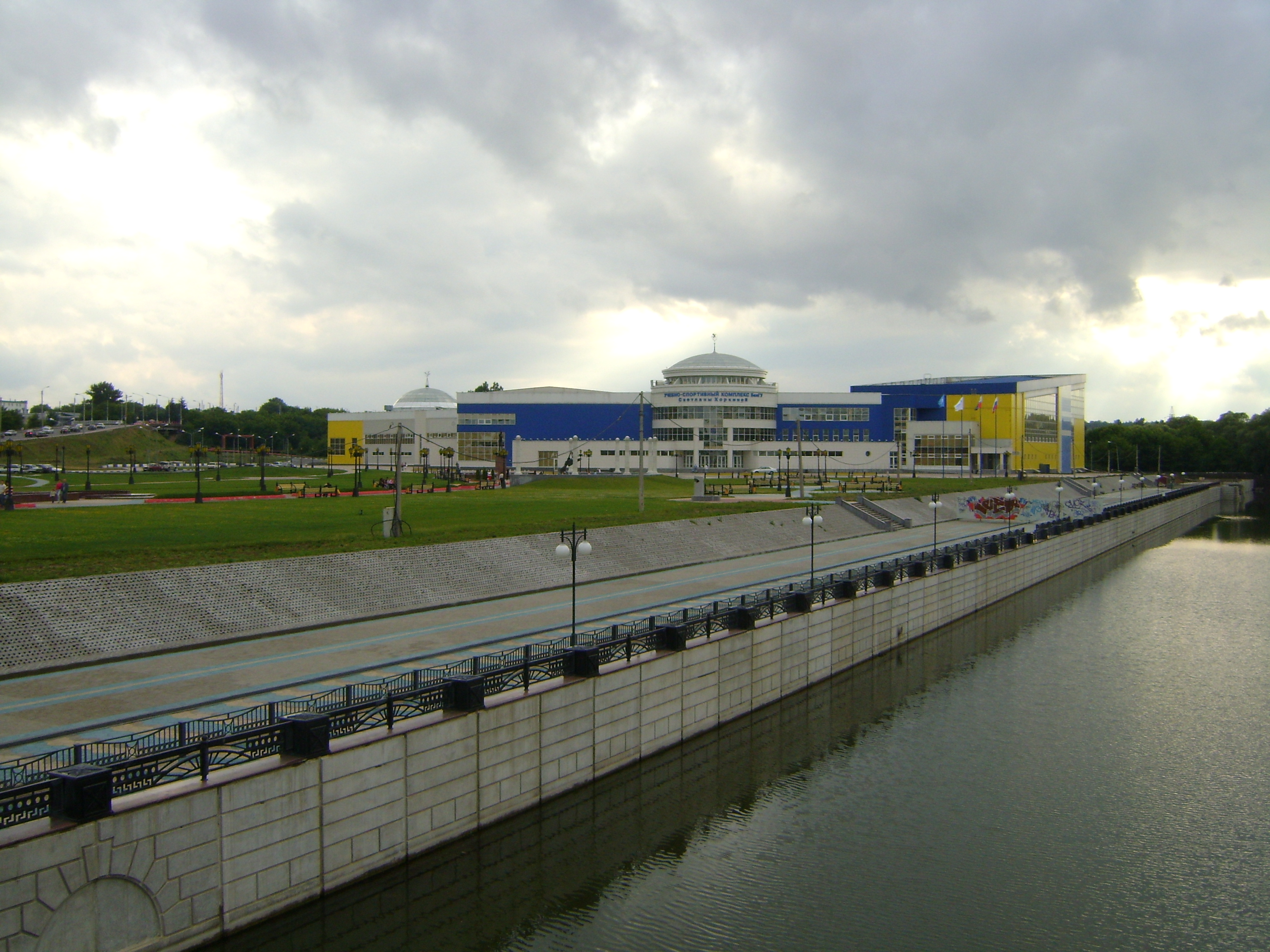
The sport complex of the Belgorod State University, named in honour of Khorkina, in Belgorod, her native city

Svetlana Khorkina was born on 19 January 1979, the daughter of Vasiliy and Lyubov. She has a younger sister, Yulia, who was also a gymnast. Khorkina said, "As a child, I was very picky with my food. My mother hoped, that if she puts me into gymnastics, I would start eating breakfast without frowning, after having spent a lot of energy in the gym. This is how, by simple nutritional reasons, I started my gymnastics career at the age of four."

At 1.65 m (5'5"), most people thought that Khorkina was too tall to be an artistic gymnast. However, her coach, Boris Pilkin, saw her potential and created alternative training methods and skills to accommodate her taller body. Khorkina has more skills named after her in the Code of Points than any other gymnast.

Khorkina was known for her dramatic and opinionated personality, often being called a diva. She said, "I wouldn't have been called a diva or a queen if I wasn't creative. My costume and make-up were always important to me. When people come to see gymnastics they want a performance, not just a sport. I have a talent. I have accomplished so much in sport it will take dozens of years before anyone else achieves as much".

After retiring from gymnastics, in December 2005 Khorkina was named vice-president of the Russian Artistic Gymnastics Federation. In 2008, she was a commentator for the Beijing Olympics' gymnastics competition for the Russian TV station NTV+ and released her autobiography entitled, "Somersaults in High Heels" published by Olma-Press She was also an ambassador for the 2014 Winter Olympics in Sochi, Russia. Khorkina has been a member of the political party of United Russia since 2003. She was elected as a deputy for the Russian State Duma in 2007 and served until 2011.

In July 2005, Khorkina gave birth to a son, Svyatoslav Khorkin, at Cedars-Sinai Medical Center in Los Angeles, United States. The father was later revealed to be businessman Kirill Shubsky, who was married to actress and film director Vera Glagoleva. In April 2011, Khorkina married Oleg Kochnev. Khorkina and Kochnev have a son, Ivan, born in October 2019.

== Political views ==
In March 2022, during the Russian invasion of Ukraine, Khorkina posted an image of the 'Z' military symbol which is commonly used by Russian invading forces in Ukraine, with the comment, "A campaign for those who are not ashamed of being Russian. Let's spread it!"

== Competitive history ==
Year	Event	Team	AA	VT	UB	BB	FX
1994
1994	European Championships	2nd place, silver medalist(s)	2nd place, silver medalist(s)	5	1st place, gold medalist(s)	5	8
1994	Goodwill Games	1st place, gold medalist(s)		3rd place, bronze medalist(s)	1st place, gold medalist(s)		5
1994	World Championships	3rd place, bronze medalist(s)	9	2nd place, silver medalist(s)	2nd place, silver medalist(s)		8
1995
1995	World Championships	4	2nd place, silver medalist(s)	5	1st place, gold medalist(s)		
1996
1996	European Championships	2nd place, silver medalist(s)	6	4	1st place, gold medalist(s)		
1996	World Championships			5	1st place, gold medalist(s)		
1996	Olympic Games	2nd place, silver medalist(s)	15		1st place, gold medalist(s)		
1997
1997	World Championships	2nd place, silver medalist(s)	1st place, gold medalist(s)	8	1st place, gold medalist(s)	2nd place, silver medalist(s)	2nd place, silver medalist(s)
1998
1998	European Championships	2nd place, silver medalist(s)	1st place, gold medalist(s)		1st place, gold medalist(s)		1st place, gold medalist(s)
1998	Goodwill Games †		7				7
1998	World Cup Final			5	2nd place, silver medalist(s)	4	4
1999
1999	World Championships	2nd place, silver medalist(s)	11		1st place, gold medalist(s)		3rd place, bronze medalist(s)
2000
2000	European Championships	1st place, gold medalist(s)	1st place, gold medalist(s)		1st place, gold medalist(s)	1st place, gold medalist(s)	
2000	Olympic Games	2nd place, silver medalist(s)	10	WD	1st place, gold medalist(s)		2nd place, silver medalist(s)
2001	Goodwill Games		2nd place, silver medalist(s)	4	1st place, gold medalist(s)		2nd place, silver medalist(s)
2001	World Championships	2nd place, silver medalist(s)	1st place, gold medalist(s)	1st place, gold medalist(s)	1st place, gold medalist(s)		3rd place, bronze medalist(s)
2002
2002	European Championships	1st place, gold medalist(s)	1st place, gold medalist(s)		1st place, gold medalist(s)	2nd place, silver medalist(s)	5
2002	World Championships				7	4	
2003
2003	World Championships	6	1st place, gold medalist(s)				
2004
2004	European Championships	3rd place, bronze medalist(s)	4		1st place, gold medalist(s)	3rd place, bronze medalist(s)	7
2004	Olympic Games	3rd place, bronze medalist(s)	2nd place, silver medalist(s)		8		

†1998 Goodwill Games: mixed pairs silver medal with Alexei Nemov.

Year	Competition description	Location	Apparatus	Rank-Final	Score-Final	Rank-Qualifying	Score-Qualifying
1994	European Championships	Stockholm	Team	2	115.422		
1994	European Championships	Stockholm	All-Around	2	39.224		
1994	European Championships	Stockholm	Vault	5	9.749		
1994	European Championships	Stockholm	Uneven Bars	1	9.887		
1994	European Championships	Stockholm	Balance Beam	5	9.775		
1994	European Championships	Stockholm	Floor Exercise	8	9.350		
1994	World Championships	Dortmund	Team	3	194.546	4	385.515
1994	World Championships	Brisbane	All-Around	9	38.805		
1994	World Championships	Brisbane	Vault	2	9.800	5	9.693
1994	World Championships	Brisbane	Uneven Bars	2	9.875	3	9.812
1994	World Championships	Brisbane	Floor Exercise	8	8.487	9	9.587
1995	World Championships	Sabae	Team	4	384.689		
1995	World Championships	Sabae	All-Around	2	39.130	10	77.224
1995	World Championships	Sabae	Vault	5	9.618	7	19.312
1995	World Championships	Sabae	Uneven Bars	1	9.900	1	19.637
1995	World Championships	Sabae	Balance Beam			15	19.100
1995	World Championships	Sabae	Floor Exercise			31	19.175
1996	European Championships	Birmingham	Team	2	115.659		
1996	European Championships	Birmingham	All-Around	6	38.549	7	38.437
1996	European Championships	Birmingham	Vault	4	9.725	3	9.825
1996	European Championships	Birmingham	Uneven Bars	1	9.825	1	9.812
1996	European Championships	Birmingham	Balance Beam			22	9.175
1996	European Championships	Birmingham	Floor Exercise			11	9.625
1996	World Championships	San Juan	Vault	5	9.637		
1996	World Championships	San Juan	Vault (Semi−Final)			4	9.662
1996	World Championships	San Juan	Vault (Qualification)			2	9.668
1996	World Championships	San Juan	Uneven Bars	1	9.787		
1996	World Championships	San Juan	Uneven Bars (Semi−Final)			1	9.825
1996	World Championships	San Juan	Uneven Bars (Qualification)			1	9.825
1996	Olympic Games	Atlanta	Team	2	388.404		
1996	Olympic Games	Atlanta	All-Around	15	38.455	9	77.648
1996	Olympic Games	Atlanta	Vault			16	19.350
1996	Olympic Games	Atlanta	Uneven Bars	1	9.850	2	19.662
1996	Olympic Games	Atlanta	Balance Beam			6	19.312
1996	Olympic Games	Atlanta	Floor Exercise			23	19.324
1997	World Championships	Lausanne	Team	2	153.197	1	153.401
1997	World Championships	Lausanne	All-Around	1	38.636		
1997	World Championships	Lausanne	Vault	8	4.537	2	9.762
1997	World Championships	Lausanne	Uneven Bars	1	9.875	2	9.650
1997	World Championships	Lausanne	Balance Beam	2	9.787	1	9.775
1997	World Championships	Lausanne	Floor Exercise	2	9.800	9	9.637
1998	European Championships	Saint Petersburg	Team	2	112.720		
1998	European Championships	Saint Petersburg	All-Around	1	38.624	3	38.074
1998	European Championships	Saint Petersburg	Vault	WD		4	9.562
1998	European Championships	Saint Petersburg	Uneven Bars	1	9.900	1	9.862
1998	European Championships	Saint Petersburg	Balance Beam			20	9.075
1998	European Championships	Saint Petersburg	Floor Exercise	1	9.787	7	9.575
1998	World Cup Final	Sabae	Vault	5	9.343		
1998	World Cup Final	Sabae	Uneven Bars	2	9.825		
1998	World Cup Final	Sabae	Balance Beam	4	9.512		
1998	World Cup Final	Sabae	Floor Exercise	4	9.162		
1999	World Championships	Tianjin	Team	2	153.209	2	153.576
1999	World Championships	Tianjin	All-Around	11	37.611	3	38.699
1999	World Championships	Tianjin	Vault			7	9.587
1999	World Championships	Tianjin	Uneven Bars	1	9.837	1	9.837
1999	World Championships	Tianjin	Balance Beam			22	9.475
1999	World Championships	Tianjin	Floor Exercise	3	9.787	2	9.800
2000	European Championships	Paris	Team	1	115.760		
2000	European Championships	Paris	All-Around	1	38.749	2	38.818
2000	European Championships	Paris	Vault			7	9.468
2000	European Championships	Paris	Uneven Bars	1	9.837	1	9.850
2000	European Championships	Paris	Balance Beam	1	9.837	2	9.775
2000	European Championships	Paris	Floor Exercise			6	9.725
2000	Olympic Games	Sydney	Team	2	154.403	1	154.874
2000	Olympic Games	Sydney	All-Around	10	37.929	1	39.005
2000	Olympic Games	Sydney	Vault	WD		3	9.731
2000	Olympic Games	Sydney	Uneven Bars	1	9.862	1	9.850
2000	Olympic Games	Sydney	Balance Beam			12	9.662
2000	Olympic Games	Sydney	Floor Exercise	2	9.812	2	9.762
2001	World Championships	Ghent	Team	2	109.023	4	144.134
2001	World Championships	Ghent	All-Around	1	37.617	1	37.224
2001	World Championships	Ghent	Vault	1	9.412	1	9.562
2001	World Championships	Ghent	Uneven Bars	1	9.437	1	9.662
2001	World Championships	Ghent	Balance Beam			34	8.600
2001	World Championships	Ghent	Floor Exercise	3	9.375	2	9.400
2002	European Championships	Patras	Team	1	111.833		
2002	European Championships	Patras	All-Around	1	37.592	1	37.524
2002	European Championships	Patras	Vault			8	9.262
2002	European Championships	Patras	Uneven Bars	1	9.550	1	9.787
2002	European Championships	Patras	Balance Beam	2	9.262	3	9.150
2002	European Championships	Patras	Floor Exercise	5	9.075	2	9.325
2002	World Championships	Debrecen	Uneven Bars	7	7.387		
2002	World Championships	Debrecen	Uneven Bars (Semi−Final)			1	9.762
2002	World Championships	Debrecen	Uneven Bars (Qualification)			1	9.737
2002	World Championships	Debrecen	Balance Beam	4	9.125		
2002	World Championships	Debrecen	Balance Beam (Semi−Final)			3	9.462
2002	World Championships	Debrecen	Balance Beam (Qualification)			15	8.625
2003	World Championships	Anaheim	Team	6	108.985	5	145.572
2003	World Championships	Anaheim	All-Around	1	38.124	3	37.249
2003	World Championships	Anaheim	Vault			6	9.331
2003	World Championships	Anaheim	Uneven Bars			12	9.450
2003	World Championships	Anaheim	Balance Beam			14	9.262
2003	World Championships	Anaheim	Floor Exercise			11	9.312
2004	European Championships	Amsterdam	Team	3	110.423		
2004	European Championships	Amsterdam	All-Around	4	36.848	1	37.686
2004	European Championships	Amsterdam	Uneven Bars	1	9.662	1	9.687
2004	European Championships	Amsterdam	Balance Beam	3	9.325	5	9.262
2004	European Championships	Amsterdam	Floor Exercise	7	9.112	8	9.200
2004	Olympic Games	Athens	Team	3	113.235	4	149.420
2004	Olympic Games	Athens	All-Around	2	38.211	5	37.836
2004	Olympic Games	Athens	Vault			20	9.106
2004	Olympic Games	Athens	Uneven Bars	8	8.925	1	9.750
2004	Olympic Games	Athens	Balance Beam			27	9.137
2004	Olympic Games	Athens	Floor Exercise			15	9.437

== See also ==
- List of Olympic female gymnasts for Russia
- List of top Olympic gymnastics medalists
- List of top medalists at the World Artistic Gymnastics Championships
