= Gymnastics at the 2004 Summer Olympics – Women's artistic team all-around =

Women's artistic team all-around at the Games of the XXVIII Olympiad

Medalists
1st place, gold medalist(s)		Oana Ban, Alexandra Eremia, Cătălina Ponor, Monica Roșu, Nicoleta Daniela Șofronie and Silvia Stroescu	Romania
2nd place, silver medalist(s)		Mohini Bhardwaj, Annia Hatch, Terin Humphrey, Courtney Kupets, Courtney McCool and Carly Patterson	United States
3rd place, bronze medalist(s)		Ludmila Ezhova, Svetlana Khorkina, Maria Kryuchkova, Anna Pavlova, Elena Zamolodchikova and Natalia Ziganshina	Russia

These are the results of the women's artistic team all-around competition, one of six events for female competitors of the artistic gymnastics discipline contested in the gymnastics at the 2004 Summer Olympics in Athens. The qualification and final rounds took place on August 15 and August 17 at the Olympic Indoor Hall.

The scoring for the team event had been changed again since the 2000 Summer Olympics in Sydney. The new format only three athletes from each national team competed on each piece of apparatus, and all scores counted towards the final combined total at the end.

The medals for the competition were presented by Carlos Arthur Nuzman, Brazil; IOC Member, and the medalists' bouquets were presented by Nicolae Vieru, Romania; FIG Vice-president.

== Results ==
=== Qualification ===
Twelve national teams composed by six gymnasts competed in the team all-around event in the artistic gymnastics qualification round on August 15. The eight highest scoring teams advanced to the final on August 17.

=== Final ===
Rank	Team	Vault	Uneven Bars	Balance Beam	Floor Exercise	Total
Gold medal	Romania	28.437 (1)	28.136 (5)	28.961 (1)	28.749 (1)	114.283
Gold medal	Oana Ban		9.187	9.512	9.437	28.136
Gold medal	Alexandra Eremia			9.687		9.687
Gold medal	Cătălina Ponor	9.412		9.762	9.750	28.924
Gold medal	Monica Roșu	9.625	9.387			19.012
Gold medal	Nicoleta Daniela Șofronie	9.400	9.562		9.562	28.524
Gold medal	Silvia Stroescu					
Silver medal	United States	28.387 (2)	28.524 (1)	28.499 (3)	28.174 (3)	113.584
Silver medal	Mohini Bhardwaj	9.500		9.400	9.325	28.225
Silver medal	Annia Hatch	9.562				9.562
Silver medal	Terin Humphrey		9.575	9.487		19.062
Silver medal	Courtney Kupets		9.662		9.187	18.849
Silver medal	Courtney McCool					
Silver medal	Carly Patterson	9.325	9.287	9.612	9.662	37.886
Bronze medal	Russia	28.325 (3)	28.137 (4)	28.511 (2)	28.262 (2)	113.235
Bronze medal	Ludmila Ezhova		9.437	9.437		18.874
Bronze medal	Svetlana Khorkina	9.375	9.650	9.437	9.600	38.062
Bronze medal	Maria Krioutchkova					
Bronze medal	Anna Pavlova	9.425		9.637	9.275	28.337
Bronze medal	Elena Zamolodchikova	9.525			9.387	18.912
Bronze medal	Natalia Ziganchina		9.050			9.050
4	Ukraine	28.099 (6)	28.199 (3)	28.024 (4)	27.987 (4)	112.309
4	Mirabella Akhunu				8.975	8.975
4	Alina Kozich	9.362	9.512	9.550	9.650	38.074
4	Iryna Krasnianska		9.187	9.387		18.574
4	Alona Kvasha	9.362			9.362	18.724
4	Olga Sherbatykh	9.375				9.375
4	Irina Yarotska		9.500	9.087		18.587
5	Spain	27.599 (7)	28.412 (2)	27.724 (5)	27.837 (5)	111.572
5	Laura Campos					
5	Tania Gener	9.275	9.500			18.775
5	Elena Gómez	9.187	9.475	9.000	9.575	37.237
5	Monica Mesalles	9.137		9.312	8.800	27.249
5	Patricia Moreno				9.462	9.462
5	Sara Moro		9.437	9.412		18.849
6	France	28.162 (4)	27.011 (8)	27.537 (6)	27.449 (6)	110.159
6	Coralie Chacon	9.462				9.462
6	Soraya Chaouch		8.937		8.987	17.924
6	Marine Debauve		9.437	9.400	9.350	28.187
6	Emilie Lepennec	9.325	8.637	8.850	9.112	35.924
6	Camille Schmutz			9.287		9.287
6	Isabelle Severino	9.375				9.375
7	China	28.149 (5)	27.549 (6)	27.224 (7)	27.086 (8)	110.008
7	Cheng Fei	9.475			9.662	19.137
7	Fan Ye		8.537	9.337		17.874
7	Li Ya		9.450	8.300		17.750
7	Lin Li		9.562			9.562
7	Wang Tiantian	9.362			8.637	17.999
7	Zhang Nan	9.312		9.587	8.787	27.686
8	Australia	27.449 (8)	27.100 (7)	26.974 (8)	27.324 (7)	108.847
8	Karen Nguyen	9.112				9.112
8	Stephanie Moorhouse			9.187	9.037	18.224
8	Melissa Munro	9.162		9.150	8.912	27.224
8	Monette Russo		8.125			8.125
8	Lisa Skinner		9.425			9.425
8	Allana Slater	9.175	9.550	8.637	9.375	36.737
