= 2002 European Women's Artistic Gymnastics Championships =

24th European Women's Artistic Gymnastics Championships
- Location: Patras, Greece
- Dates: 18 to 21 April 2002
- Nations: Members of the European Union of Gymnastics

The 24th European Women's Artistic Gymnastics Championships were held from 18 April to 21 April 2002 in Patras.

== Medalists ==
Event	Gold	Silver	Bronze
Seniors
Team	Russia; Svetlana Khorkina; Natalia Ziganshina; Ludmila Ezhova; Elena Zamolodchikova; Ekaterina Shuster	Netherlands; Verona van de Leur; Suzanne Harmes; Gabriëlla Wammes; Renske Endel; Monique Nuijten	Italy; Maria Teresa Gargano; Ilaria Colombo; Monica Bergamelli
Individual all-around	(Russia) Svetlana Khorkina	(Netherlands) Verona van de Leur	(Ukraine) Alona Kvasha
Vault	(Russia) Natalia Ziganshina	(Netherlands) Verona van de Leur	(Romania) Oana Petrovschi
Uneven bars	(Russia) Svetlana Khorkina	(Netherlands) Renske Endel	(United Kingdom) Beth Tweddle
Balance beam	(Russia) Ludmila Ezhova	(Russia) Svetlana Khorkina	(Netherlands) Verona van de Leur
Floor	(Ukraine) Alona Kvasha	(Russia) Natalia Ziganshina	(Netherlands) Verona van de Leur
Juniors
Team	Russia; Anna Pavlova; Elena Anochina; Polina Miller; Maria Kryuchkova; Gulwara Ziganchina	Romania; Florica Leonida; Monica Roșu; Alexandra Eremia; Iuliana Chindea; Elena Velicu	France; Émilie Le Pennec; Coralie Chacon; Gaelle Richard; Marine Debauve; Soraya Chaouch
Individual all-around	(Russia) Anna Pavlova	(Romania) Florica Leonida	(Russia) Elena Anochina
Vault	(Russia) Anna Pavlova	(Romania) Iuliana Chindea	(Romania) Monica Roșu
Uneven bars	(Ukraine) Alina Kozich	(Greece) Maria Mastrogiannopoulou	(Ukraine) Inna Teslenko
Balance beam	(Romania) Florica Leonida	(Russia) Anna Pavlova	(Russia) Elena Anochina
Floor	(Ukraine) Mirabella Akhunu	(Romania) Florica Leonida	(Romania) Monica Roșu

=== Medal table ===
==== Combined ====
Rank	Nation	Gold	Silver	Bronze	Total
1	Russia (RUS)	8	3	2	13
2	Ukraine (UKR)	3	0	2	5
3	Romania (ROU)	1	4	3	8
4	Netherlands (NED)	0	4	2	6
5	Greece (GRE)	0	1	0	1
6	France (FRA)	0	0	1	1
6	Great Britain (GBR)	0	0	1	1
6	Italy (ITA)	0	0	1	1
Totals (8 entries)		12	12	12	36

==== Seniors ====
Rank	Nation	Gold	Silver	Bronze	Total
1	Russia (RUS)	5	2	0	7
2	Ukraine (UKR)	1	0	1	2
3	Netherlands (NED)	0	4	2	6
4	Great Britain (GBR)	0	0	1	1
4	Italy (ITA)	0	0	1	1
4	Romania (ROU)	0	0	1	1
Totals (6 entries)		6	6	6	18

==== Juniors ====
Rank	Nation	Gold	Silver	Bronze	Total
1	Russia (RUS)	3	1	2	6
2	Ukraine (UKR)	2	0	1	3
3	Romania (ROU)	1	4	2	7
4	Greece (GRE)	0	1	0	1
5	France (FRA)	0	0	1	1
Totals (5 entries)		6	6	6	18

== Senior Results ==
=== Team competition ===
The team competition also served as qualification for the individual all-around and event finals. The top 8 teams are listed below.

Rank	Team	Vault (gymnastics)	Uneven bars	Balance beam	Floor (gymnastics)	Total
1st place, gold medalist(s)	Russia	28.287	28.561	27.912	27.074	111.833
1st place, gold medalist(s)	Svetlana Khorkina	9.262	9.787	9.150	9.325	111.833
1st place, gold medalist(s)	Natalia Ziganshina	9.537	9.337	9.137	9.287	111.833
1st place, gold medalist(s)	Ludmila Ezhova		9.437	9.625		111.833
1st place, gold medalist(s)	Elena Zamolodchikova	9.487				111.833
1st place, gold medalist(s)	Ekaterina Shuster				8.362	111.833
2nd place, silver medalist(s)	Netherlands	27.700	27.099	26.249	26.587	107.635
2nd place, silver medalist(s)	Verona van de Leur	9.375	8.712	8.812	9.137	107.635
2nd place, silver medalist(s)	Suzanne Harmes	9.175	9.087	8.787	8.700	107.635
2nd place, silver medalist(s)	Gabriëlla Wammes	9.150			8.750	107.635
2nd place, silver medalist(s)	Renske Endel		9.300			107.635
2nd place, silver medalist(s)	Monique Nuijten			8.650		107.635
3rd place, bronze medalist(s)	Italy	27.987	26.962	25.787	25.212	105.948
3rd place, bronze medalist(s)	Maria Teresa Gargano	9.250	9.025	8.637	9.000	105.948
3rd place, bronze medalist(s)	Ilaria Colombo	9.325	8.725	9.225	8.012	105.948
3rd place, bronze medalist(s)	Monica Bergamelli	9.412	9.212	7.925	8.200	105.948
4	Ukraine	27.649	27.436	24.499	26.274	105.858
4	Alona Kvasha	9.412	9.137	8.325	9.212	105.858
4	Tatiana Yarosh	9.150	8.837		9.100	105.858
4	Natalia Sirobaba	9.087		7.587	7.962	105.858
4	Irina Yarotska		9.462	8.587		105.858
5	France	27.024	25.287	25.399	26.337	104.047
5	Delphine Regease	9.087	8.550	8.787		104.047
5	Clélia Coutzac	8.950	7.737		8.825	104.047
5	Aurélie Hedouin	8.987			8.625	104.047
5	Estelle Courivaud		9.000	8.450		104.047
5	Marlène Peron			8.162	8.887	104.047
6	Great Britain	27.187	24.924	25.287	25.374	102.772
6	Beth Tweddle	9.162	9.137	8.787	8.600	102.772
6	Rebecca Owen	8.825	8.250	8.300	8.262	102.772
6	Katy Lennon	9.200	7.537	8.200	8.512	102.772
7	Bulgaria	27.612	23.975	24.062	25.362	101.011
7	Evgeniya Kuznetsova	9.225	8.500	8.537	8.812	101.011
7	Ralitsa Rangelova	9.250	7.575	8.000	8.600	101.011
7	Nikolina Tankousheva	9.137	7.900	7.525	7.950	101.011
8	Belarus	26.549	24.462	24.599	24.949	100.559
8	Yulia Tarasenka	8.950	8.400	7.975	8.450	100.559
8	Iryna Milko	8.837		8.337	8.137	100.559
8	Svetlana Pracharenka	8.762	7.562		8.362	100.559
8	Tatiana Aharanova		8.500	8.287		100.559

=== All-around ===
Rank	Gymnast	Vault (gymnastics)	Uneven bars	Balance beam	Floor (gymnastics)	Total
1st place, gold medalist(s)	Svetlana Khorkina (RUS)	9.118	9.787	9.300	9.387	37.592
2nd place, silver medalist(s)	Verona van de Leur (NED)	9.318	9.537	9.125	9.562	37.542
3rd place, bronze medalist(s)	Alona Kvasha (UKR)	9.168	9.200	8.662	9.375	36.405
4	Natalia Ziganshina (RUS)	8.993	9.400	8.637	9.250	36.280
5	Oana Petrovschi (ROU)	9.162	9.025	8.825	9.262	36.274
6	Suzanne Harmes (NED)	9.237	8.925	8.837	9.062	36.061
7	Elena Gómez (ESP)	9.024	8.825	8.850	9.312	36.011
8	Evgeniya Kuznetsova (BUL)	9.224	8.737	8.737	9.112	35.810
9	Maria Teresa Gargano (ITA)	9.050	8.987	8.625	8.837	35.499
10	Rebecca Owen (GBR)	8.737	8.712	8.687	9.062	35.198
11	Jana Komrsková (CZE)	9.175	8.875	8.575	8.550	35.175
12	Monica Bergamelli (ITA)	9.012	9.150	8.512	8.412	35.086
13	Vasiliki Millousi (GRE)	8.524	8.587	8.675	8.487	34.273
14	Beth Tweddle (GBR)	8.418	9.100	7.987	8.737	34.242
15	Maja Hribar (SLO)	8.562	8.700	8.125	8.350	33.737
16	Yulia Tarasenka (BLR)	8.718	9.362	7.650	7.700	33.430
17	Annukka Almenoska (FIN)	8.556	8.525	7.775	8.475	33.331
18	Céline Sohet (BEL)	8.499	8.425	8.087	8.187	33.198
19	Michal Moreli (ISR)	8.906	7.950	7.725	8.387	32.968
20	Zuzana Oboňová (CZE)	8.575	8.037	7.800	7.912	32.324
21	Ralitsa Rangelova (BUL)	8.781	8.325	7.537	7.637	32.280
22	Karolina Bohman (SWE)	8.812	8.237	7.337	7.837	32.223
23	Renata Kiss (HUN)	8.268	7.562	7.475	8.212	31.517
24	Irina Misiugina (LAT)	8.368	7.562	7.175	8.087	31.192

=== Vault ===
Rank	Gymnast	Total
1st place, gold medalist(s)	Natalia Ziganshina (RUS)	9.443
2nd place, silver medalist(s)	Verona van de Leur (NED)	9.387
3rd place, bronze medalist(s)	Oana Petrovschi (ROU)	9.131
4	Alona Kvasha (UKR)	9.043
4	Elena Zamolodchikova (RUS)	9.043
6	Elena Gómez (ESP)	8.999
7	Ilaria Colombo (ITA)	8.993
8	Monica Bergamelli (ITA)	4.575

=== Uneven bars ===
Rank	Gymnast	Total
1st place, gold medalist(s)	Svetlana Khorkina (RUS)	9.550
2nd place, silver medalist(s)	Renske Endel (NED)	9.450
3rd place, bronze medalist(s)	Beth Tweddle (GBR)	9.287
4	Suzanne Harmes (NED)	9.187
5	Monica Bergamelli (ITA)	9.112
6	Alona Kvasha (UKR)	9.025
7	Ludmila Ezhova (RUS)	8.700
8	Irina Yarotska (UKR)	7.487

=== Balance beam ===
Rank	Gymnast	Total
1st place, gold medalist(s)	Ludmila Ezhova (RUS)	9.562
2nd place, silver medalist(s)	Svetlana Khorkina (RUS)	9.262
3rd place, bronze medalist(s)	Verona van de Leur (NED)	9.187
4	Ilaria Colombo (ITA)	9.100
5	Suzanne Harmes (NED)	8.850
6	Delphine Regease (FRA)	8.650
7	Beth Tweddle (GBR)	8.550
8	Elena Gómez (ESP)	8.525

=== Floor ===
Rank	Gymnast	Total
1st place, gold medalist(s)	Alona Kvasha (UKR)	9.500
2nd place, silver medalist(s)	Natalia Ziganshina (RUS)	9.450
3rd place, bronze medalist(s)	Verona van de Leur (NED)	9.400
4	Elena Gomez (ESP)	9.362
5	Svetlana Khorkina (RUS)	9.075
6	Dimitra Kastritsi (GRE)	9.062
7	Maria Teresa Gargano (ITA)	9.000
8	Tatiana Yarosh (UKR)	8.800

== Junior Results ==
=== Team competition ===
Rank	Team	Vault (gymnastics)	Uneven bars	Balance beam	Floor (gymnastics)	Total
1st place, gold medalist(s)	Russia	27.299	27.350	26.899	26.675	108.223
1st place, gold medalist(s)	Anna Pavlova	9.299	9.375	9.287	9.275	108.223
1st place, gold medalist(s)	Elena Anochina	9.150	9.175	9.037	8.350	108.223
1st place, gold medalist(s)	Polina Miller		8.800	8.575		108.223
1st place, gold medalist(s)	Maria Kryuchkova				9.050	108.223
1st place, gold medalist(s)	Gulwara Ziganchina	8.850				108.223
2nd place, silver medalist(s)	Romania	27.468	25.512	26.399	28.000	107.379
2nd place, silver medalist(s)	Florica Leonida	8.875	8.275	9.312	9.475	107.379
2nd place, silver medalist(s)	Monica Roșu	9.406	8.625		9.325	107.379
2nd place, silver medalist(s)	Alexandra Eremia			8.800	9.200	107.379
2nd place, silver medalist(s)	Iuliana Chindea	9.187		8.287		107.379
2nd place, silver medalist(s)	Elena Velicu		8.612			107.379
3rd place, bronze medalist(s)	France	26.817	26.624	25.762	27.324	106.527
3rd place, bronze medalist(s)	Émilie Le Pennec	8.956	8.937	8.687	9.287	106.527
3rd place, bronze medalist(s)	Coralie Chacon	8.824		8.275	9.037	106.527
3rd place, bronze medalist(s)	Gaelle Richard	9.037	8.875			106.527
3rd place, bronze medalist(s)	Marine Debauve		8.812	8.800		106.527
3rd place, bronze medalist(s)	Soraya Chaouch				9.000	106.527
4	Ukraine	26.718	27.412	24.761	26.486	105.377
4	Alina Kozich	8.850	9.425	8.637	9.012	105.377
4	Mirabella Akhunu	9.050	8.587	8.337	9.162	105.377
4	Inna Teslenko	8.818	9.400	7.787		105.377
4	Iryna Krasnianska				8.312	105.377
5	Netherlands	27.099	25.736	24.999	25.337	103.171
5	Berber van den Berg	8.850	8.812	8.262	8.062	103.171
5	Loes Linders	9.093		8.275	8.425	103.171
5	Patricia Lasomer	9.156	8.437			103.171
5	Mayra Kroonen			8.462	8.850	103.171
5	Shalina Groenveld		8.487			103.171
6	Italy	27.104	25.286	25.699	24.174	102.263
6	Michela Merzario	8.874	8.137	8.837	8.325	102.263
6	Marika Pestrin	9.143	8.687	8.550	7.337	102.263
6	Giorgia Benecchi	9.087	8.462		8.512	102.263
6	Giuseppina Cozzolino			8.312		102.263
7	Greece	26.691	25.362	24.924	24.450	101.427
7	Stefani Bismpikou	9.099	9.162	8.687	8.675	101.427
7	Sofia Tsegkeli	8.643	7.225	8.625	8.275	101.427
7	Maria Mastrogiannopoulou	8.949	8.975			101.427
7	Eleni Andreadou			7.612		101.427
7	Maria Apostolidi				7.500	101.427
8	Great Britain	25.823	24.112	24.474	25.400	99.809
8	Ashton Johnston	8.637	8.075	7.950	8.250	99.809
8	Helen Galashan	8.418	8.050	8.087		99.809
8	Vanessa Hobbs	8.768			8.475	99.809
8	Melanie Roberts		7.987	8.437		99.809
8	Samantha Bayley				8.675	99.809

=== All-around ===
Rank	Gymnast	Vault (gymnastics)	Uneven bars	Balance beam	Floor (gymnastics)	Total
1st place, gold medalist(s)	Anna Pavlova (RUS)	9.375	9.412	8.775	9.162	36.724
2nd place, silver medalist(s)	Florica Leonida (ROU)	8.843	9.087	8.900	9.350	36.180
3rd place, bronze medalist(s)	Elena Anochina (RUS)	9.268	9.100	8.650	8.737	35.755
4	Alina Kozich (UKR)	9.093	9.350	8.475	8.750	35.668
5	Berber van den Berg (NED)	9.212	8.912	8.487	8.612	35.223
6	Stefani Bismpikou (GRE)	8.812	9.112	7.925	9.112	34.961
7	Marika Pestrin (ITA)	9.156	8.787	8.362	8.462	34.767
8	Ella Sarkadi (HUN)	8.856	8.575	7.887	8.737	34.055
9	Michela Merzario (ITA)	8.868	8.075	8.787	8.287	34.017
10	Mirabella Akhunu (UKR)	9.137	6.775	8.675	8.950	33.537
11	Sofia Tsegkeli (GRE)	8.974	7.612	8.350	8.325	33.261
12	Tina Erceg (CRO)	8.668	8.350	7.950	8.225	33.193
13	Heike Gunne (GER)	9.037	8.425	7.850	7.800	33.112
14	Patricia Moreno (ESP)	9.087	7.787	7.475	8.362	32.711
15	Ashton Johnston (GBR)	8.824	8.375	7.550	7.912	32.661
16	Aksana Novikava (BLR)	8.937	7.725	7.837	8.137	32.636
17	Lenika de Simone (ESP)	9.050	7.650	7.475	8.412	32.587
18	Veronika Ožanová (CZE)	8.856	7.462	8.612	7.625	32.555
19	Liliya Luksha (BLR)	8.831	8.712	8.362	6.487	32.392
20	Joy Studer (SUI)	8.487	7.812	7.750	7.862	31.911
20	Veronica Wagner (SWE)	8.762	6.312	8.562	8.275	31.911
22	Petra Chytilová (CZE)	8.468	7.062	8.175	8.025	31.730
23	Kitti Gál (HUN)	8.612	8.387	6.087	8.400	31.486
24	Maria Stankiewicz (POL)	8.468	7.812	6.825	8.162	31.267

=== Vault ===
Rank	Gymnast	Total
1st place, gold medalist(s)	Anna Pavlova (RUS)	9.399
2nd place, silver medalist(s)	Iuliana Chindea (ROU)	9.212
3rd place, bronze medalist(s)	Monica Roșu (ROU)	9.112
4	Elena Anochina (RUS)	9.056
5	Aksana Novikava (BLR)	9.018
6	Patricia Lasomer (NED)	8.975
7	Stefani Bismpikou (GRE)	8.950
8	Marika Pestrin (ITA)	8.868

=== Uneven bars ===
Rank	Gymnast	Total
1st place, gold medalist(s)	Alina Kozich (UKR)	9.437
2nd place, silver medalist(s)	Maria Mastrogiannopoulou (GRE)	9.387
3rd place, bronze medalist(s)	Inna Teslenko (UKR)	9.362
4	Stefani Bismpikou (GRE)	9.125
5	Gaelle Richard (FRA)	8.937
6	Anna Pavlova (RUS)	8.700
7	Polina Miller (RUS)	8.675
8	Émilie Le Pennec (FRA)	8.525

=== Balance beam ===
Rank	Gymnast	Total
1st place, gold medalist(s)	Florica Leonida (ROU)	9.437
2nd place, silver medalist(s)	Anna Pavlova (RUS)	9.400
3rd place, bronze medalist(s)	Elena Anochina (RUS)	9.025
4	Alexandra Eremia (ROU)	8.987
5	Marine Debauve (FRA)	8.725
6	Émilie Le Pennec (FRA)	8.587
7	Stefani Bismpikou (GRE)	8.462
8	Michela Merzario (ITA)	8.325

=== Floor ===
Rank	Gymnast	Total
1st place, gold medalist(s)	Mirabella Akhunu (UKR)	9.512
2nd place, silver medalist(s)	Florica Leonida (ROU)	9.487
3rd place, bronze medalist(s)	Monica Roșu (ROU)	9.262
4	Patricia Moreno (ESP)	9.250
5	Anna Pavlova (RUS)	9.150
6	Maria Kryuchkova (RUS)	8.800
7	Coralie Chacon (FRA)	8.662
8	Émilie Le Pennec (FRA)	8.475
