= World Artistic Gymnastics Championships – Women's uneven bars =

Women's events at the Artistic Gymnastics World Championships were first held in 1934 at the 10th World Championships, initially featuring only the All-Around and Team events. In 1938, at the 11th World Championships, the other apparatus events were added. Originally women participated in parallel bars competition (like in the men's program). Starting from 1950, at the 12th World Championships, it was replaced with uneven bars competition which has been held every year since its inception.

Three medals are awarded: gold for first place, silver for second place, and bronze for third place. Tie breakers have not been used in every year. In the event of a tie between two gymnasts, both names are listed, and the following position (second for a tie for first, third for a tie for second) is left empty as no medal is awarded for that position. If three or more gymnasts tie for a position, the following two positions are left empty.

== Medalists ==
=== Parallel bars ===
Year	Location	Gold	Silver	Bronze
1938	(Czechoslovakia) Prague *	(Czechoslovakia) Vlasta Děkanová * (Czechoslovakia) Matylda Pálfyová *	—N/a	unknown

* There is conflicting and incomplete information about medal winners in the individual apparatus events at the 1938 World Artistic Gymnastics Championships as non-primary sources gives different information about it.

=== Uneven bars ===
Bold number in brackets denotes record number of victories.

Year	Location	Gold	Silver	Bronze
1950	(Switzerland) Basel	(Austria) Gertrude Kolar (Sweden) Ann-Sofi Pettersson	—N/a	(Poland) Helena Rakoczy
1954	(Italy) Rome	(Hungary) Ágnes Keleti	(Soviet Union) Galina Rudko	(Poland) Helena Rakoczy
1958	(Soviet Union) Moscow	(Soviet Union) Larisa Latynina	(Czechoslovakia) Eva Bosáková	(Soviet Union) Polina Astakhova
1962	(Czechoslovakia) Prague	(Soviet Union) Irina Pervushina	(Czechoslovakia) Eva Bosáková	(Soviet Union) Larisa Latynina
1966	(West Germany) Dortmund	(Soviet Union) Natalia Kuchinskaya	(Japan) Keiko Ikeda	(Japan) Taniko Mitsukuri
1970	(Socialist Federal Republic of Yugoslavia) Ljubljana	(East Germany) Karin Janz	(Soviet Union) Ludmilla Tourischeva	(Soviet Union) Zinaida Voronina
1974	(Bulgaria) Varna	(East Germany) Annelore Zinke	(Soviet Union) Olga Korbut	(Soviet Union) Ludmilla Tourischeva
1978	(France) Strasbourg	(United States) Marcia Frederick	(Soviet Union) Elena Mukhina	(Romania) Emilia Eberle
1979	(United States) Fort Worth	(East Germany) Maxi Gnauck (China) Ma Yanhong	—N/a	(Romania) Emilia Eberle
1981	(Soviet Union) Moscow	(East Germany) Maxi Gnauck	(China) Ma Yanhong	(Soviet Union) Yelena Davydova (United States) Julianne McNamara
1983	(Hungary) Budapest	(East Germany) Maxi Gnauck	(Romania) Lavinia Agache (Romania) Ecaterina Szabó	—N/a
1985	(Canada) Montreal	(East Germany) Gabriele Fähnrich	(East Germany) Dagmar Kersten	(Czechoslovakia) Hana Říčná
1987	(Netherlands) Rotterdam	(Romania) Daniela Silivaș (East Germany) Dörte Thümmler	—N/a	(Soviet Union) Yelena Shushunova
1989	(West Germany) Stuttgart	(China) Fan Di (Romania) Daniela Silivaș	—N/a	(Soviet Union) Olga Strazheva
1991	(United States) Indianapolis	(North Korea) Kim Gwang-suk	(Soviet Union) Tatiana Gutsu (United States) Shannon Miller	—N/a
1992	(France) Paris	(Romania) Lavinia Miloșovici	(United States) Betty Okino	(Romania) Mirela Pașca
1993	(United Kingdom) Birmingham	(United States) Shannon Miller	(United States) Dominique Dawes	(Romania) Andreea Cacovean
1994	(Australia) Brisbane	(China) Luo Li	(Russia) Svetlana Khorkina	(Russia) Dina Kochetkova
1995	(Japan) Sabae	(Russia) Svetlana Khorkina	(China) Mo Huilan (Ukraine) Lilia Podkopayeva	—N/a
1996	(Puerto Rico) San Juan	(Russia) Svetlana Khorkina (Belarus) Elena Piskun	—N/a	(France) Isabelle Severino
1997	(Switzerland) Lausanne	(Russia) Svetlana Khorkina	(China) Meng Fei	(China) Bi Wenjing
1999	(China) Tianjin	(Russia) Svetlana Khorkina	(China) Huang Mandan	(China) Ling Jie
2001	(Belgium) Ghent	(Russia) Svetlana Khorkina (5)	(Netherlands) Renske Endel	(United States) Katie Heenan
2002	(Hungary) Debrecen	(United States) Courtney Kupets	(Romania) Oana Petrovschi	(Russia) Ludmila Ezhova
2003	(United States) Anaheim	(United States) Chellsie Memmel (United States) Hollie Vise	—N/a	(United Kingdom) Beth Tweddle
2005	(Australia) Melbourne	(United States) Nastia Liukin	(United States) Chellsie Memmel	(United Kingdom) Beth Tweddle
2006	(Denmark) Aarhus	(United Kingdom) Beth Tweddle	(United States) Nastia Liukin	(Italy) Vanessa Ferrari
2007	(Germany) Stuttgart	(Russia) Ksenia Semyonova	(United States) Nastia Liukin	(China) Yang Yilin
2009	(United Kingdom) London	(China) He Kexin	(Japan) Kōko Tsurumi	(United States) Rebecca Bross (Romania) Ana Porgras
2010	(Netherlands) Rotterdam	(United Kingdom) Beth Tweddle	(Russia) Aliya Mustafina	(United States) Rebecca Bross
2011	(Japan) Tokyo	(Russia) Viktoria Komova	(Russia) Tatiana Nabieva	(China) Huang Qiushuang
2013	(Belgium) Antwerp	(China) Huang Huidan	(United States) Kyla Ross	(Russia) Aliya Mustafina
2014	(China) Nanning	(China) Yao Jinnan	(China) Huang Huidan	(Russia) Daria Spiridonova
2015	(United Kingdom) Glasgow	(China) Fan Yilin (United States) Madison Kocian (Russia) Viktoria Komova (Russia) Daria Spiridonova	—N/a	—N/a
2017	(Canada) Montreal	(China) Fan Yilin	(Russia) Elena Eremina	(Belgium) Nina Derwael
2018	(Qatar) Doha	(Belgium) Nina Derwael	(United States) Simone Biles	(Germany) Elisabeth Seitz
2019	(Germany) Stuttgart	(Belgium) Nina Derwael	(United Kingdom) Becky Downie	(United States) Sunisa Lee
2021	(Japan) Kitakyushu	(China) Wei Xiaoyuan	(Brazil) Rebeca Andrade	(China) Luo Rui
2022	(United Kingdom) Liverpool	(China) Wei Xiaoyuan	(United States) Shilese Jones	(Belgium) Nina Derwael
2023	(Belgium) Antwerp	(China) Qiu Qiyuan	(Algeria) Kaylia Nemour	(United States) Shilese Jones
2025	(Indonesia) Jakarta	(Algeria) Kaylia Nemour	Angelina Melnikova	(China) Yang Fanyuwei
2026	(Netherlands) Rotterdam	(Algeria) Kaylia Nemour	(Germany) Helen Kevric	(United States) Skye Blakely

== All-time medal count ==
Last updated after the 2026 World Championships.

Rank	Nation	Gold	Silver	Bronze	Total
1	China	11	5	6	22
2	Russia	9	4	4	17
3	United States	7	9	7	23
4	East Germany	7	1	0	8
5	Soviet Union	3	5	7	15
6	Romania	3	3	5	11
7	Czechoslovakia	2	2	1	5
8	Great Britain	2	1	2	5
9	Algeria	2	1	0	3
10	Belgium	2	0	2	4
11	Austria	1	0	0	1
11	Belarus	1	0	0	1
11	Hungary	1	0	0	1
11	North Korea	1	0	0	1
11	Sweden	1	0	0	1
16	Japan	0	2	1	3
17	Germany	0	1	1	2
18	Brazil	0	1	0	1
18	Netherlands	0	1	0	1
18	Ukraine	0	1	0	1
–	Individual Neutral Athletes ^{[a]}	0	1	0	1
21	Poland	0	0	2	2
22	France	0	0	1	1
22	Italy	0	0	1	1
Totals (23 entries)		53	38	40	131

Note

- ^[a] At the 2025 World Artistic Gymnastics Championships in Jakarta, Indonesia, in accordance with sanctions imposed following by the 2022 Russian invasion of Ukraine, athletes from Russia were not permitted to use the name, flag, or anthem of Russia. They instead participated as "Individual Neutral Athletes (AIN)", their medals were not included in the official medal table.

== Multiple medalists ==
Rank	Gymnast	Nation	Years	Gold	Silver	Bronze	Total
1	Svetlana Khorkina	Russia	1994–2001	5	1	0	6
2	Maxi Gnauck	East Germany	1979–1983	3	0	0	3
3	Kaylia Nemour	Algeria	2023–2026	2	1	0	3
4	Nina Derwael	Belgium	2017–2022	2	0	2	4
4	Beth Tweddle	Great Britain	2003–2010	2	0	2	4
6	Fan Yilin	China	2015–2017	2	0	0	2
6	Viktoria Komova	Russia	2011–2015	2	0	0	2
6	Daniela Silivaș	Romania	1987–1989	2	0	0	2
6	Wei Xiaoyuan	China	2021–2022	2	0	0	2
10	Nastia Liukin	United States	2005–2007	1	2	0	3
11	Huang Huidan	China	2013–2014	1	1	0	2
11	Ma Yanhong	China	1979–1981	1	1	0	2
11	Chellsie Memmel	United States	2003–2005	1	1	0	2
14	Larisa Latynina	Soviet Union	1958–1962	1	0	1	2
14	Daria Spiridonova	Russia	2014–2015	1	0	1	2
16	Eva Bosáková	Czechoslovakia	1958–1962	0	2	0	2
17	Shilese Jones	United States	2022–2023	0	1	1	2
17	Aliya Mustafina	Russia	2010–2013	0	1	1	2
17	Ludmilla Tourischeva	Soviet Union	1970–1974	0	1	1	2
20	Rebecca Bross	United States	2009–2010	0	0	2	2
20	Emilia Eberle	Romania	1978–1979	0	0	2	2
20	Helena Rakoczy	Poland	1950–1954	0	0	2	2
