= Gymnastics at the 2004 Summer Olympics – Women's artistic individual all-around =

Women's artistic individual all-around at the Games of the XXVIII Olympiad
- Venue: Olympic Indoor Hall
- Date: 15 August 2004 (qualifying); 19 August 2004 (final)
- Competitors: 98 from 32 nations
- Winning total: 38.387

Medalists
1st place, gold medalist(s)		Carly Patterson	United States
2nd place, silver medalist(s)		Svetlana Khorkina	Russia
3rd place, bronze medalist(s)		Zhang Nan	China

These are the results of the women's individual all-around competition, one of six events for female competitors in the artistic gymnastics discipline contested in the gymnastics at the 2004 Summer Olympics in Athens. The qualification and final rounds took place on August 15 and August 19 at the Olympic Indoor Hall.

Carly Patterson became the first American to win the gold medal in 20 years after Mary Lou Retton's victory at the 1984 Olympics.

== Results ==
=== Qualification ===
Ninety-eight gymnasts qualified to compete in the individual all-around event in the artistic gymnastics qualification round on August 15, by performing on at least one apparatus. The twenty-four highest scoring gymnasts advanced to the final on August 19.

=== Final ===
Rank	Gymnast	Vault	Uneven Bars	Balance Beam	Floor Exercise	Total
Gold medal	Carly Patterson (USA)	9.375 (=4)	9.575 (7)	9.725 (1)	9.712 (1)	38.387
Silver medal	Svetlana Khorkina (RUS)	9.462 (1)	9.725 (1)	9.462 (4)	9.562 (5)	38.211
Bronze medal	Zhang Nan (CHN)	9.325 (=6)	9.462 (15)	9.662 (2)	9.600 (=3)	38.049
4	Anna Pavlova (RUS)	9.425 (2)	9.337 (18)	9.650 (3)	9.612 (2)	38.024
5	Nicoleta Daniela Șofronie (ROU)	9.412 (3)	9.637 (4)	9.362 (6)	9.537 (6)	37.948
6	Irina Yarotska (UKR)	9.200 (=14)	9.650 (3)	9.400 (5)	9.437 (9)	37.687
7	Marine Debauve (FRA)	9.162 (18)	9.512 (=12)	9.262 (8)	9.425 (10)	37.361
8	Elena Gómez (ESP)	9.150 (19)	9.525 (11)	9.162 (10)	9.462 (8)	37.299
9	Courtney Kupets (USA)	9.275 (9)	9.625 (5)	8.975 (12)	9.237 (=14)	37.112
10	Allana Slater (AUS)	9.175 (17)	9.362 (17)	9.212 (9)	9.350 (13)	37.099
11	Alina Kozich (UKR)	9.250 (12)	9.512 (=12)	8.687 (17)	9.600 (=3)	37.049
12	Daniele Hypólito (BRA)	8.825 (23)	9.562 (=8)	9.337 (7)	9.237 (=14)	36.961
13	Wang Tiantian (CHN)	9.375 (=4)	9.537 (10)	8.725 (16)	9.162 (18)	36.799
14	Émilie Lepennec (FRA)	9.300 (8)	9.687 (2)	8.112 (22)	9.537 (7)	36.636
15	Stefani Bismpikou (GRE)	8.887 (22)	9.475 (14)	8.900 (13)	9.237 (=14)	36.499
16	Camila Comin (BRA)	9.187 (16)	9.437 (16)	8.525 (18)	8.925 (=19)	36.074
17	Kwang Sun Pyon (PRK)	8.525 (24)	9.587 (6)	8.850 (14)	8.900 (22)	35.862
18	Kate Richardson (CAN)	9.262 (=10)	8.087 (23)	9.037 (11)	9.400 (12)	35.786
19	Beth Tweddle (GBR)	8.987 (21)	9.562 (=8)	7.800 (24)	9.412 (11)	35.761
20	Stephanie Moorhouse (AUS)	9.037 (20)	8.587 (22)	8.200 (=20)	8.925 (=19)	35.723
21	Katy Lennon (GBR)	9.262 (=10)	8.987 (20)	8.200 (=20)	8.925 (=19)	35.374
22	Leyanet Gonzalez Calero (CUB)	9.325 (=6)	8.725 (21)	8.012 (23)	9.237 (=14)	35.299
23	Aagje Vanwalleghem (BEL)	9.225 (13)	9.075 (19)	8.287 (19)	8.275 (24)	34.862
24	Melanie Banville (CAN)	9.200 (=14)	8.025 (24)	8.787 (15)	8.462 (23)	34.474

== See also ==
- Gymnastics at the 2004 Summer Olympics – Men's artistic individual all-around
