= Nikolina Tankoucheva =

Bulgarian artistic gymnast (born 1986)

- Николина Танкушева
- Alternative name: Nikolina Tankusheva
- Nickname: Nina
- Born: 5 February 1986 (age 40)

Gymnastics career
- Discipline: Women's artistic gymnastics
- Country represented: Bulgaria (2008)

Nikolina Tankoucheva (Bulgarian: Николина Танкушева; born 5 February 1986) is a Bulgarian former artistic gymnast. She won six national titles and competed at the 2008 Summer Olympics. She has since worked as a coach and as a lecturer in physical education.

== Personal life ==
Tankoucheva's family was involved in gymnastics. Her father was head coach of the Bulgarian men's team, her brother, Ivan, was a member of the team, and her mother competed in artistic gymnastics and won the Bulgarian balance beam title in 1977 before becoming a judge and coach.

She enrolled in the National Sports Academy "Vasil Levski" and graduated in 2008; she obtained a master's degree in 2009 and a doctoral degree in 2019. She has trained as a judge and worked as a coach, and she has been a lecturer at Sofia University since 2015. In 2025, she published a book on gymnastics coaching pedagogy.

== Career ==
Tankoucheva competed at the 2000 junior European Championships, where she placed 50th. In 2002, she competed as a senior at the European Championships, where she placed 26th in the qualification round. At the national championships, she won the all-around bronze medal behind Evgeniya Kuznetsova and Ralitsa Rangelova.

A few weeks before the 2002 World Championships, Tankoucheva learned a vault known as the Scherbo in the men's code of points. She landed the vault at the competition and became the first woman to do so in international competition. However, the vault does not currently bear her name in the women's code of points. She qualified for the floor final at the competition, but she was withdrawn; it was announced that she had injured herself while warming up, but Tankoucheva said that she was not injured and that the Bulgarian federation had decided to withdraw her, to her disappointment.

At the 2003 European Team Championships, each team could pre-pick a routine whose score would be doubled. The Bulgarian team picked Tankoucheva's vault, but she received a score of zero. In June, she again placed third at the national championships, and she won gold in the vault, balance beam, and floor finals. In August, she planned to compete at the 2003 World Championships, but she had to withdraw after she injured her foot.

In 2004, she competed at the European Championships and qualified to the all-around final, where she placed 21st. The next year, she again competed at the 2005 European Championships in June, and she finished in 45th. Later in June, she won the Bulgarian all-around title. She competed at the 2005 World Championships in November and placed 31st in the all-around qualifications.

Tankoucheva competed at the 2006 European Championships in April, where she finished in 67th place. All the Bulgarian championships in June, she finished in second. She went on to win two of the event finals, uneven bars and floor. In October, at the 2006 World Championships, she placed 64th.

In April 2007, she competed at the European Championships on only two apparatuses, uneven bars and beam. She won another all-around national title in June. At the 2007 World Championships, she finished in 79th place and won an individual quota to compete at the upcoming 2008 Summer Olympics.

In 2008, she won a sixth national title. Although she had a years-old spinal injury which meant she was in constant pain, she was able to compete at the Olympics. In the qualifying round, she finished 60th.
