= Natalia Ziganshina =

Russian artistic gymnast (born 1985)

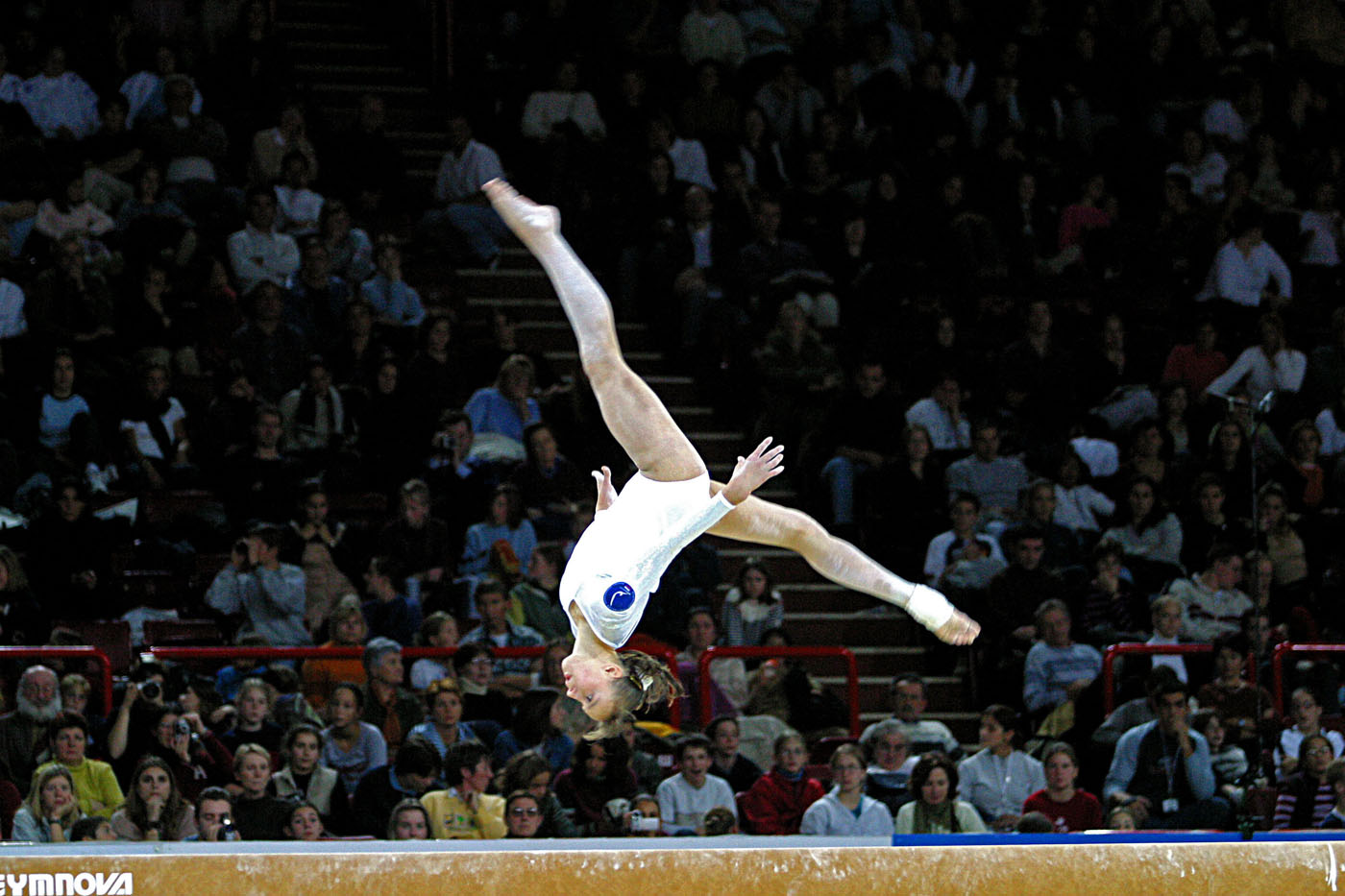
- Ziganshina competing on the balance beam in 2002

Personal information
- Full name: Natalia Kamilovna Ziganshina
- Alternative name: Natalya Ziganshina
- Born: 24 December 1985 (age 40) Leningrad, Soviet Union
- Height: 156 cm (5 ft 1 in)

Gymnastics career
- Discipline: Women's artistic gymnastics
- Country represented: Russia
- Club: Dynamo Saint Petersburg
- Head coach: Viktor Gavrichenkov
Medal record
Representing Russia
Olympic Games
Bronze medal – third place	2004 Athens	Team
World Championships
Silver medal – second place	2001 Ghent	Team
Silver medal – second place	2001 Ghent	All-around
Silver medal – second place	2002 Debrecen	Vault
European Championships
Gold medal – first place	2002 Patras	Team
Gold medal – first place	2002 Patras	Vault
Silver medal – second place	2002 Patras	Floor exercise
Goodwill Games
Silver medal – second place	2001 Brisbane	Uneven bars

Natalia Kamilovna Ziganshina (Russian: Наталья Камиловна Зиганшина; born 24 December 1985) is a Russian former artistic gymnast. She won a bronze medal in the team event at the 2004 Summer Olympics. She is the 2001 World all-around silver medalist and the 2002 World vault silver medalist. She won three medals at the 2002 European Championships, including the vault title.

== Personal life ==
Ziganshina was born on 24 December 1985 in Leningrad, where she grew up with her four siblings in a two-bedroom apartment. Her father is a Tatar. Her younger sister, Gulnara, also competed in gymnastics, appearing at the 2002 Junior European Championships. She studied at the Lesgaft National State University of Physical Education, Sport and Health.

== Gymnastics career ==
Ziganshina was coached by Viktor Gavrichenkov, the coach of Olympic all-around champion Yelena Shushunova. She was a member of Russia's gold-medal team at the 2000 Junior European Championships, where she also won a silver medal on the uneven bars and a bronze medal in the all-around.

At the 2001 Goodwill Games, Ziganshina won a silver medal on the uneven bars. Prior to the 2001 World Championships in Ghent, Belgium, she fell on the floor exercise and had a concussion, but she still competed. She helped the Russian team win the silver medal, behind Romania. She then won an individual silver medal in the all-around competition, behind teammate Svetlana Khorkina.

At the 2002 European Championships, Ziganshina won a gold medal with the Russian team. She finished fourth in the all-around final after falling off the balance beam and stepping out of bounds on the floor exercise. She then won a gold medal in the vault final and a silver medal in the floor exercise, behind Ukraine's Alona Kvasha. She won bronze medals on both the vault and floor exercise at the 2002 Glasgow World Cup. Then at the Paris World Cup, she won the floor exercise gold medal. At the 2002 World Championships, she won a silver medal on the vault, behind teammate Elena Zamolodchikova.

Ziganshina did not compete at the 2003 World Championships in Anaheim due to a hip injury. She tore her meniscus in the spring of 2004 and missed the 2004 European Championships. She was able to return to competition at the 2004 Russian Championships and was named to represent Russia at the 2004 Summer Olympics. During the qualification round, she competed in the all-around but did not advance into any individual finals. She only competed on the uneven bars during the team final and fell, but the Russian team still won the bronze medal.

Ziganshina announced her retirement from competition in 2007, citing injuries.

== Competitive history ==
Competitive history of Natalia Ziganshina
Year	Event	Team	AA	VT	UB	BB	FX
2001
2001	World Championships	2nd place, silver medalist(s)	2nd place, silver medalist(s)				
2002
2002	European Championships	1st place, gold medalist(s)	4	1st place, gold medalist(s)			2nd place, silver medalist(s)
2002	World Championships			2nd place, silver medalist(s)			7
2002	World Cup Final						8
2004
2004	Olympic Games	3rd place, bronze medalist(s)					

== See also ==
- List of Olympic female gymnasts for Russia
