= Oleksandr Svitlychnyi =

Ukrainian gymnast (born 1972)

- Олександр Миколайович Світличний
- Full name: Oleksandr Mykolaiovych Svitlychnyi
- Born: 23 August 1972 (age 54) Kharkiv, Ukrainian SSR, Soviet Union
- Height: 1.64 m (5 ft 5 in)

Gymnastics career
- Discipline: Men's artistic gymnastics
- Country represented: Ukraine
- Club: Dynamo Luhansk
Medal record
Men's artistic gymnastics
Representing Ukraine
Olympic Games
Silver medal – second place	2000 Sydney	Team
Bronze medal – third place	1996 Atlanta	Team
European Championships
Silver medal – second place	1996 Copenhagen	Team
Bronze medal – third place	1996 Copenhagen	Horizontal bar
Bronze medal – third place	2000 Bremen	Team
Bronze medal – third place	2000 Bremen	Vault
European Team Championships
Silver medal – second place	1999 Patras	Team
Silver medal – second place	2001 Riesa	Team
Bronze medal – third place	1997 Paris	Team

Oleksandr Mykolaiovych Svitlychnyi (born 23 August 1972) is a Ukrainian gymnast. He won a bronze medal at the 1996 Summer Olympics, and a silver medal at the 2000 Summer Olympics.
