= Oana Ban =

Romanian artistic gymnast

- Full name: Oana Mihaela Ban
- Born: 11 January 1986 (age 40) Cluj-Napoca, Romania

Gymnastics career
- Discipline: Women's artistic gymnastics
- Country represented: Romania (1999–2004 (ROM))
- Gym: Deva National Training Center
- Head coach: Octavian Belu
- Assistant coach: Mariana Bitang
- Retired: 2004
Medal record
Olympic Games
Gold medal – first place	2004 Athens	Team
World Championships
Silver medal – second place	2002 Debrecen	Balance beam
Silver medal – second place	2003 Anaheim	Team

Oana Mihaela Ban (born 11 January 1986 in Cluj-Napoca) is a retired Romanian artistic gymnast. She is an Olympic gold medalist with the team and a world silver medalist on beam and with the team. Her best events were the floor and the balance beam.

== Early career ==
Oana Ban started to train for gymnastics in her hometown at "Viitorul" Gymnastics Club with coaches Rodica Câmpean and Anton Ciupe. Ban quickly rose to prominence as one of Romania's top junior world-class gymnasts. She competed in her first Romanian national championships in 1998, winning the floor exercise event in the junior division. The following year, she was invited to join the Romanian national team, and began working with coaches Octavian Belu and Mariana Bitang at the elite training facility in Deva. Success in major international junior meets soon followed, including a first-place finish at the Top Gym tournament in Belgium in 1999 and a bronze medal at the 2001 European Youth Olympic Days.

== Senior career ==
=== 2002-2003 ===
With her early January birth date, Ban missed the eligibility cutoff for the 2001 World Championships by 11 days. She was forced to wait until 2002 to make her international senior debut. At the 2002 World Championships in Debrecen, Ban won a silver medal on the balance beam, one of Romania's only victories of the competition, and placed fourth on the floor finals. Later that year she placed second all around at the Chunichi Cup (behind teammate Oana Petrovschi) and won the Massilia Cup. In 2003, Ban had a similarly strong showing, contributing to the Romanian team's silver medal at the 2003 World Championships and placing sixth in the all-around final. That year she successfully competed in several international competitions, winning the all around silver medal at the Gander Memorial behind Cătălina Ponor and the all around bronze medal at the 2003 Chunichi cup behind Andreea Munteanu and Svetlana Khorkina. She also won silver on beam at the 2003 Cottbus Cup and the 2003 DTB Cup and won the Swiss cup together with Marian Drăgulescu.

=== Athens 2004 ===
Oana's career highlight came at the 2004 Summer Olympics in Athens, where she, along with teammates Monica Roșu, Alexandra Eremia, Cătălina Ponor, Daniela Șofronie and Silvia Stroescu, won the gold medal in the team competition. Ban contributed heavily to the Romanian victory, competing on uneven bars, balance beam, and floor in the team finals. Individually, she qualified for both the all-around and the floor exercise final. She also placed fifth in the qualifications for the balance beam final but she could not compete due to the two per country rule. Unfortunately, an injury sustained on her last event in the team competition forced her to sit out both competitions and essentially ended her Olympic experience. For Ban, the situation was unfortunate: she had qualified to the all-around in an impressive third place; her qualifying floor score would have been good enough for second place. She was replaced in the floor final by Daniela Şofronie who won the silver medal.

== Post-retirement ==
Ban retired from gymnastics after the Olympics; she is currently a coach in her hometown of Cluj-Napoca, Romania. She participated in the 4th televised competition of Kunoichi in Japan. She made it past the First Stage of the competition, but failed on the Floating Bridge of Stage 2.

== Skills ==
During her career, Ban specialized on floor exercise and beam. Her favorite event was floor; she was renowned for her difficult tumbling and fast-paced, playful, crowd-pleasing choreography. As many of her Romanian teammates, her weakness was the uneven bars. In spite of her powerful tumbling skills and strength, Ban was not an especially strong vaulter. Nonetheless, she was able to perform as an all-around gymnast for the Romanian team, and posted scores that frequently placed her in the top ten at major competitions. She qualified in third place for the Olympic all-around in Athens and would have been a medal contender had injury not prevented it.
