= Samantha Sheehan =

American artistic gymnast

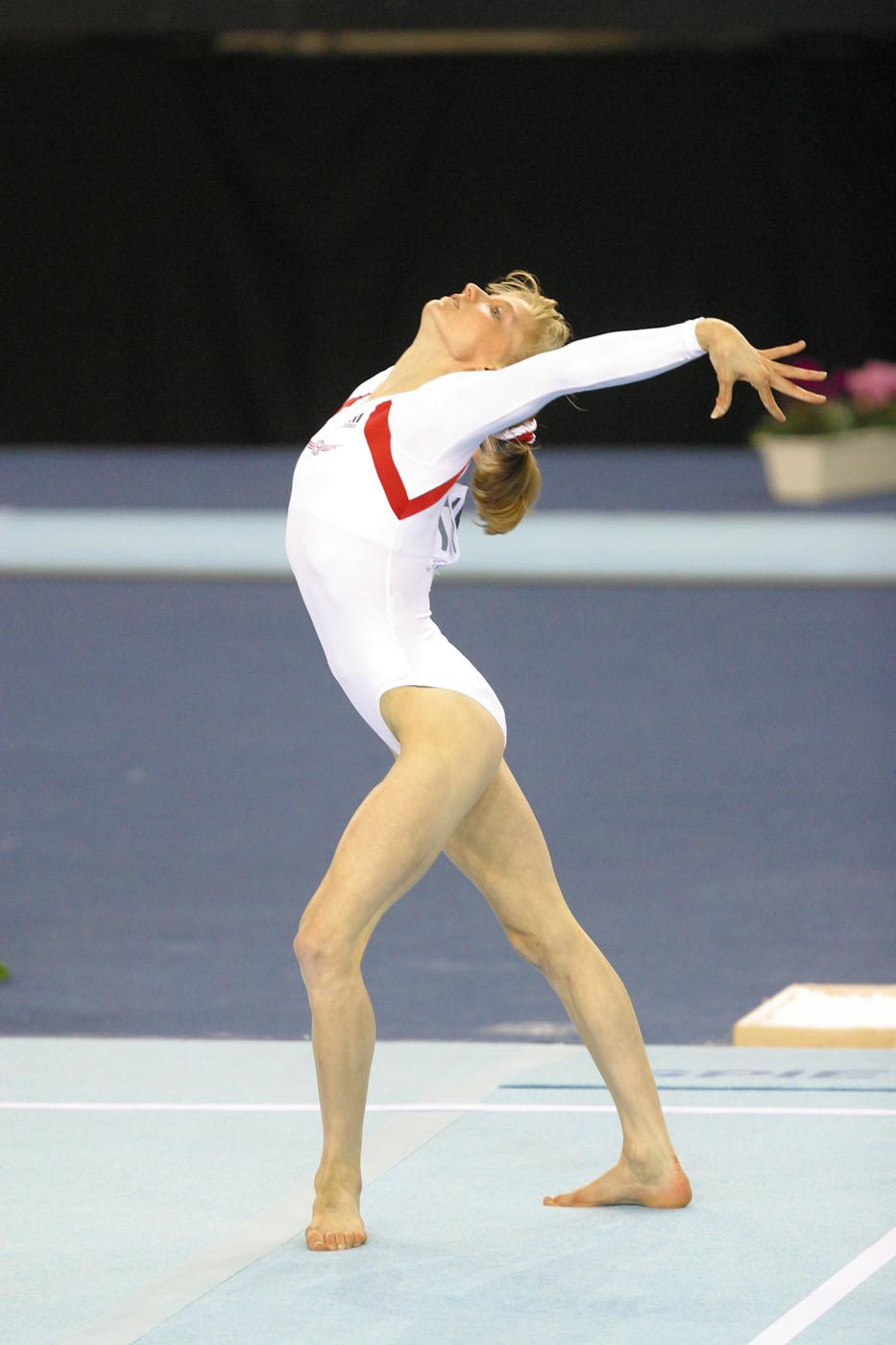
- Sheehan competing at the 2002 World Championships

Personal information
- Born: May 20, 1986 (age 40)

Gymnastics career
- Discipline: Women's artistic gymnastics
- Country represented: United States
- College team: Georgia GymDogs
- Club: Cincinnati Gymnastics Academy
- Head coach: Mary Lee Tracy
Medal record
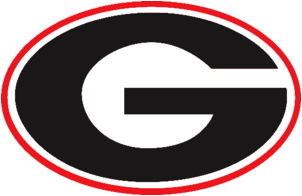
Women's artistic gymnastics
Representing United States
World Championships
Bronze medal – third place	2002 Debrecen	Floor exercise
Representing University of Georgia
NCAA Championships
Gold medal – first place	2005 Auburn	Team

Samantha Sheehan (born May 20, 1986) is an American former artistic gymnast. She won the bronze medal on floor exercise at the 2002 World Championships. Following her elite career, she competed collegiately for the Georgia GymDogs and won a team title at the 2005 NCAA Championships.

== Early life ==
Sheehan grew up in Villa Hills, Kentucky, with her twin brother and older sister. She began gymnastics when she was three years old at the Cincinnati Gymnastics Academy.

== Gymnastics career ==
Sheehan began competing at the international elite level in 2001. She placed 19th in the junior all-around at the 2001 U.S. Classic and placed eighth on the uneven bars. She then finished 22nd in the junior all-around at the 2001 U.S. Championships.

Sheehan became age-eligible for the senior elite level in 2002. At the 2002 U.S. Classic, she finished fifth in the all-around and had the highest score on the floor exercise. She then finished 11th in the all-around at the 2002 U.S. Championships. She was selected to compete at the 2002 World Championships, which would also be her international debut. She qualified for the floor exercise final in first place with a score of 9.450 after winning a tiebreaker over Daniele Hypólito. In the final, she won the bronze medal with a score of 9.325, behind Elena Gómez and Verona van de Leur.

Sheehan won the all-around at a 2003 friendly meet against Belgium and helped the United States win the team competition. She then placed 12th in the all-around at the 2003 U.S. Classic. In November 2003, she signed a National Letter of Intent with the Georgia GymDogs.

Sheehan competed at the 2004 Olympic Test Event in Athens and won a silver medal on the uneven bars, behind Li Ya. She injured her rotator cuff in May 2004 and withdrew from the 2004 U.S. Championships. Her petition to compete at the 2004 U.S. Olympic Trials was accepted. She competed on the vault, uneven bars, and floor exercise at the Olympic Trials. She was not invited to the Olympic Selection Camp.

Sheehan began competing for the Georgia GymDogs in 2005. She did not compete regularly as she was going through a growth spurt and injuries. She was part of the team that won the 2005 NCAA Championships. Starting in 2006, the team began awarding the Sam Sheehan Spirit Award.
