= Maria Teresa Gargano =

Italian artistic gymnast

- Born: 23 November 1986 (age 39) Rome, Italy

Gymnastics career
- Discipline: Women's artistic gymnastics
- Country represented: Italy (2004)
Medal record
Women's artistic gymnastics
Representing Italy
European Championships
Bronze medal – third place	2002 Patras	Team
Bronze medal – third place	2004 Amsterdam	Floor
Mediterranean Games
Silver medal – second place	2001 Tunis	Team
Silver medal – second place	2001 Tunis	Balance beam
Bronze medal – third place	2001 Tunis	Floor exercise

Maria Teresa Gargano (born 23 November 1986) is an Italian female artistic gymnast, representing her nation at international competitions.

She won the silver medal in the team event at the 2002 European Women's Artistic Gymnastics Championships, and participated at the 2003 World Artistic Gymnastics Championships. She participated at the 2004 Summer Olympics.
