= 1997 European Gymnastics Masters =

International gymnastics competition

The 1997 European Gymnastics Masters was the first edition of the European Gymnastics Masters tournament. The event would later have its name changed to European Team Gymnastics Championships. The competition formed teams of athletes representing different nations, combining events from men's and women's artistic gymnastics, as well as rhythmic gymnastics. The event was held from April 26 to April 27 in Paris, France. The tournament was organized by the European Union of Gymnastics.

== Medalists ==
Event	Gold	Silver	Bronze
Team	Belarus; Ivan Ivankov; Andrey Kan; Alena Polozkova; Elena Piskun; Tatiana Ogrizko; Evgenia Pavlina	Bulgaria; Yordan Yovchev; Christian Ivanov; Venislava Vassileva; Veselina Gentcheva; Boriana Guineva; Stella Salapatiska	Ukraine; Valery Pereshkura; Olexander Svitlichni; Viktoria Karpenko; Lilia Podkopayeva; Kateryna Serebrianska; Olena Vitrychenko

== See also ==
- 1999 European Gymnastics Masters
- 2001 European Team Gymnastics Championships
- 2003 European Team Gymnastics Championships
- European Gymnastics Championships
