= Susana García =

Spanish gymnast

Personal information
- Nationality: Spanish
- Born: 8 January 1982 (age 44) Barcelona, Spain

Sport
- Sport: Gymnastics
Medal record
Representing Spain
Women's artistic gymnastics
Mediterranean Games
Gold medal – first place	2001 Tunis	Team
Gold medal – first place	2001 Tunis	Uneven bars
Bronze medal – third place	1997 Bari	Team

Susana García Escrich (born 8 January 1982) is a Spanish gymnast. She competed in the 2000 Summer Olympics.
