= Florica Leonida =

Romanian artistic gymnast

- Born: 13 January 1987 (age 39)

Gymnastics career
- Discipline: Women's artistic gymnastics
- Country represented: Romania
- Head coach: Octavian Bellu
- Assistant coach: Mariana Bitang
- Former coach: Eliza Stoica
Medal record
World Championships
Silver medal – second place	2003 Anaheim	Team competition
European Championships
Silver medal – second place	2006 Volos	Team
European Championships (Junior)
Gold medal – first place	2002 Patras	Beam
Silver medal – second place	2002 Patras	Team
Silver medal – second place	2002 Patras	All around
Silver medal – second place	2002 Patras	Floor

Florica (Floarea) Leonida (born 13 January 1987 in Bucharest, Romania) is a retired Romanian artistic gymnast. She is a silver world medalist and a silver European medalist with the team. She was a successful junior gymnast winning gold on beam and three silver medals (all around, floor and team) at the 2002 Junior European Championships.
