= 1999 European Gymnastics Masters =

International gymnastics competition

The 1999 European Gymnastics Masters was the second edition of the European Gymnastics Masters tournament, the last one before the event changed its name to European Team Gymnastics Championships. The competition formed teams of athletes representing different nations, combining events from men's and women's artistic gymnastics, as well as rhythmic gymnastics. The event was held from June 19 to June 20 in Patras, Greece. The tournament was organized by the European Union of Gymnastics.

== Medalists ==
Event	Gold	Silver	Bronze
Team	Russia; Alexei Nemov; Alexei Bondarenko; Yelena Produnova; Svetlana Khorkina; Alina Kabaeva; Yulia Barsukova	Ukraine; Ruslan Mezentsev; Olexander Svitlichni; Inha Shkarupa; Olha Teslenko; Elena Tkatchenko; Irina Kobets	Greece; Ioannis Melissanidis; Dimosthenis Tampakos; Maria Papakou; Vasiliki Millousi; Dona Evmorfia

== See also ==
- 1997 European Gymnastics Masters
- 2001 European Team Gymnastics Championships
- 2003 European Team Gymnastics Championships
- European Gymnastics Championships
