= Carly Patterson =

American singer and gymnast (born 1988)

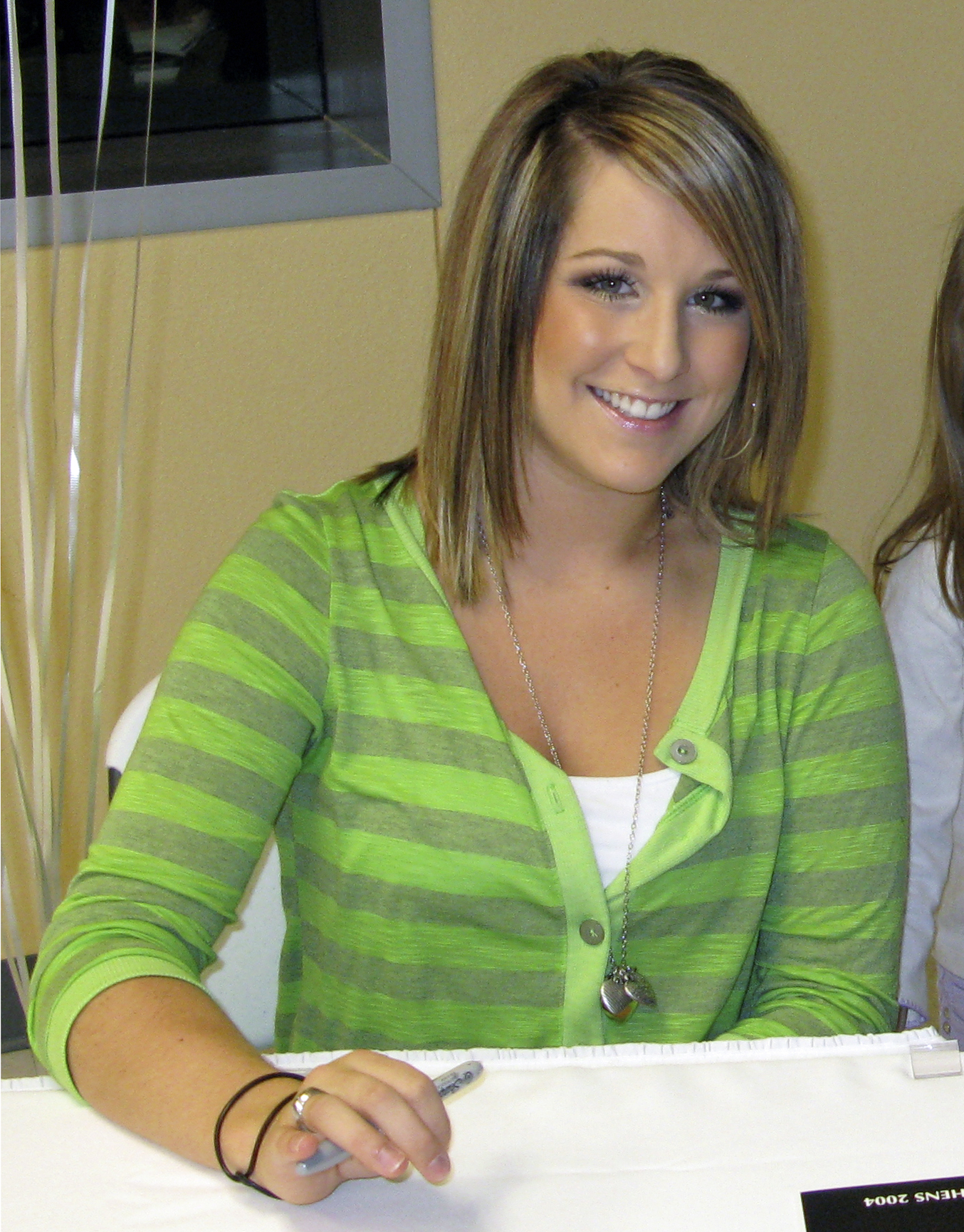
- Patterson in 2009

Personal information
- Full name: Carly Rae Patterson
- Born: February 4, 1988 (age 38) Baton Rouge, Louisiana, U.S.
- Height: 5 ft 0 in (152 cm)

Gymnastics career
- Discipline: Women's artistic gymnastics
- Country represented: United States (2000–2004)
- Club: World Olympic Gymnastics Academy
- Head coach: Evgeny Marchenko
- Assistant coach: Natasha Boyarskaya
- Choreographer: Tatiana Shegolkova
- Eponymous skills: Patterson: Double Arabian Dismount (balance beam)
- Retired: 2006
Medal record
Event	1st	2nd	3rd
Olympic Games	1	2	0
World Championships	1	1	0
American Cup	2	0	0
Total	4	3	0
Event	1st	2nd	3rd
All-Around (OG/WC)	2	2	0
Uneven Bars (OG/WC)	0	0	0
Balance Beam (OG/WC)	0	1	0
Vault (OG/WC)	0	0	0
Floor Exercise (OG/WC)	0	0	0
Total	2	3	0
Women's artistic gymnastics
Representing United States
Olympic Games
Gold medal – first place	2004 Athens	All-around
Silver medal – second place	2004 Athens	Team
Silver medal – second place	2004 Athens	Balance Beam
World Championships
Gold medal – first place	2003 Anaheim	Team
Silver medal – second place	2003 Anaheim	All-around
American Cup
Gold medal – first place	2003 Fairfax	All-around
Gold medal – first place	2004 New York	All-around
- Awards: Longines Prize for Elegance

Carly Rae Patterson (born February 4, 1988) is an American singer, songwriter and former artistic gymnast. She was the all-around champion at the 2004 Olympics, the first all-around champion for the United States at a non-boycotted Olympics, and is a member of the USA Gymnastics Hall of Fame. Patterson frequently joins radio segments on 1310 AM and 96.7 FM The Ticket in Dallas Fort-Worth.

== Gymnastics ==
Patterson began gymnastics after attending a cousin's birthday party at a Baton Rouge gymnastics club (Elite Gymnastics) in 1994. She was coached there by former Israeli Olympian Yohanan Moyal. She started competing internationally in 2000, when she was 12 years old.

=== 2000–2003 ===
In 2000, Patterson participated in the Top Gym Tournament in Belgium and won the silver medal in the all-around and the bronze on balance beam. The next year, at the 2001 Goodwill Games in Brisbane, Australia, she was ranked second in the all-around before the final rotation but missed three landings on the floor exercise and finished seventh.

Patterson became the U.S. junior national all-around champion in 2002. She then began her senior career by winning the 2003 American Cup, where she was the youngest competitor, having just turned 15. However, she was forced to sit out the 2003 U.S. National Championships, which would have been her first Nationals as a senior, because of a broken elbow.

Although she could not compete in Nationals, Patterson successfully petitioned to the 2003 World Gymnastics Championships in Anaheim, California. There, she earned the all-around silver medal, becoming the first American woman to medal in a World Championships all-around since Shannon Miller in 1994. She also helped the United States earn the team gold medal, a first for the American women.

=== 2004 ===
Patterson again won the all-around at the American Cup in 2004, a performance she dedicated to her coach Evgeny Marchenko's mother, who had died just days before the competition. Later that year, she became co-national champion with Courtney Kupets. She also won the floor exercise at the National Championships and placed second on balance beam.

At the Olympic Trials, Patterson fell off the balance beam on both days of competition, dropping her to third place. However, her performances at a subsequent national training camp were strong enough for her to make the Olympic team.

==== Olympic Games ====
At the 2004 Olympic Games in Athens, Patterson finished first overall in the preliminary round and qualified for the all-around and balance beam finals. The United States, including Patterson, struggled in the team final: She under-rotated her vault, stubbed the low bar with her foot on the uneven bars, and had several wobbles on balance beam and a lunge forward on her dismount. She later admitted to being distracted after a rushed start on vault, with her coach saying, "The beginning of the competition was stressful. It set the tone." The U.S. women, the reigning world champions, settled for silver.

In the individual all-around, Patterson narrowly defeated three-time world all-around champion Svetlana Khorkina of Russia. After scoring lower than usual on the vault (9.375), Patterson was stronger on her last three events, scoring 9.575 on the uneven bars, 9.725 on the balance beam, and 9.712 on the floor exercise. She became only the second American woman to win an Olympic all-around gold medal, and the first to do so in a non-boycotted Olympic Games. (Mary Lou Retton won the title at the 1984 Summer Olympics in Los Angeles. But because those Games were boycotted by the Soviet Union, Retton did not face the Soviet gymnasts who consistently dominated the sport during that period, accounting for five of the eight Olympic all-around champions before 1984 and nine of the ten previous world all-around champions.)

On August 23, Patterson competed in the balance beam event final, where she received a score of 9.775 and won the silver medal behind Cătălina Ponor of Romania.

=== Post-Olympics ===
Soon after the Olympics, Patterson was diagnosed with several bulging discs in her lower back that had gone unnoticed. She announced her intention to take time off from the sport to rehabilitate her back, but she officially retired in 2006 without ever participating in another major competition. She recalled the decision in a 2009 interview, saying, "I started having some back issues, and honestly, my doctor was like, 'Carly, you really need to stop if you want to be able to walk when you get older.' ... So I retired and moved on to singing."

She continues to stay occupied with event appearances, gymnastics-related and otherwise. She also has a number of high-profile corporate sponsorships; she appeared in a Mobile ESPN commercial aired during Super Bowl XL in 2006. She also finished her authorized biography, which was released in April 2006.

In December 2011, she was featured on the TV show Hollywood at Home.

=== Eponymous skill ===
Patterson has one eponymous skill listed in the Code of Points.

Apparatus	Name	Description	Difficulty (Note: Valid for the 2025–2028 Code of Points)
Balance beam	Patterson	Arabian double salto forward tucked	G (0.7)

=== Competitive history ===
Year	Event	Team	AA	VT	UB	BB	FX
Junior
2000	American Classic		13			6	
2000	U.S. Classic		3rd place, bronze medalist(s)			1st place, gold medalist(s)	6
2000	U.S. National Championships		4			2nd place, silver medalist(s)	4
2001	Goodwill Games		7			5	
2001	Pule Int'l Junior Cup		1st place, gold medalist(s)		1st place, gold medalist(s)	3rd place, bronze medalist(s)	
2001	U.S. Classic		1st place, gold medalist(s)		5	1st place, gold medalist(s)	1st place, gold medalist(s)
2001	U.S. National Championships		3rd place, bronze medalist(s)			2nd place, silver medalist(s)	
2002	Gymnix Int'l		1st place, gold medalist(s)	2nd place, silver medalist(s)		2nd place, silver medalist(s)	2nd place, silver medalist(s)
2002	Jurassic Classic	1st place, gold medalist(s)	1st place, gold medalist(s)	1st place, gold medalist(s)	2nd place, silver medalist(s)	1st place, gold medalist(s)	1st place, gold medalist(s)
2002	Pacific Alliance Championships	1st place, gold medalist(s)	2nd place, silver medalist(s)	1st place, gold medalist(s)	2nd place, silver medalist(s)	1st place, gold medalist(s)	1st place, gold medalist(s)
2002	TJ Maxx Int'l Challenge	1st place, gold medalist(s)					
2002	USA-Mexico Dual Meet	1st place, gold medalist(s)	1st place, gold medalist(s)	3rd place, bronze medalist(s)	2nd place, silver medalist(s)	1st place, gold medalist(s)	3rd place, bronze medalist(s)
2002	USA-UKR-BRA Friendly	1st place, gold medalist(s)	1st place, gold medalist(s)	2nd place, silver medalist(s)		1st place, gold medalist(s)	2nd place, silver medalist(s)
2002	American Classic		2nd place, silver medalist(s)	1st place, gold medalist(s)	5	2nd place, silver medalist(s)	1st place, gold medalist(s)
2002	National Elite Podium Meet		1st place, gold medalist(s)	1st place, gold medalist(s)	1st place, gold medalist(s)	1st place, gold medalist(s)	1st place, gold medalist(s)
2002	U.S. Classic		1st place, gold medalist(s)	4	3rd place, bronze medalist(s)	7	2nd place, silver medalist(s)
2002	U.S. National Championships		1st place, gold medalist(s)			2nd place, silver medalist(s)	3rd place, bronze medalist(s)
Senior
2003	American Cup		1st place, gold medalist(s)	2nd place, silver medalist(s)	2nd place, silver medalist(s)	1st place, gold medalist(s)	3rd place, bronze medalist(s)
2003	Pacific Challenge	1st place, gold medalist(s)	1st place, gold medalist(s)		5	3rd place, bronze medalist(s)	5
2003	Anaheim World Championships	1st place, gold medalist(s)	2nd place, silver medalist(s)				
2004	American Cup		1st place, gold medalist(s)	1st place, gold medalist(s)	1st place, gold medalist(s)	1st place, gold medalist(s)	1st place, gold medalist(s)
2004	Pacific Alliance Championships	1st place, gold medalist(s)	2nd place, silver medalist(s)			1st place, gold medalist(s)	1st place, gold medalist(s)
2004	U.S. National Championships		1st place, gold medalist(s)		5	2nd place, silver medalist(s)	1st place, gold medalist(s)
2004	Olympic Trials		3rd place, bronze medalist(s)				1st place, gold medalist(s)
2004	Athens Olympic Games	2nd place, silver medalist(s)	1st place, gold medalist(s)			2nd place, silver medalist(s)	

== Music ==
Patterson first expressed interest in becoming a professional singer in a March 2005 interview. On August 21, 2005, she gave an interview on Fox Sports Net's Sports Sunday in which she gave more details on her future career. She sang a small segment of "Damaged" and said that she went to New York City to record the demo. On December 18, 2005, she announced that she signed a demo contract for four songs with Papa Joe's Records, owned by Joe Simpson, father of Jessica and Ashlee Simpson. She worked with singer and writer Chris Megert. They wrote and produced songs titled "Time to Wake Up" and "Lost in Me".

=== Celebrity Duets ===
On August 29, 2006, she started her appearance on the show Celebrity Duets. The program was a reality competition show executive produced by Simon Cowell. Celebrities not known for singing were teamed up with professional singers; one of the eight celebrities was voted off each week. The show aired every Thursday on Fox with a results show each Friday, from September 7, 2006, to October 13, 2006.

On September 15, 2006, during the results show, Patterson was eliminated from the competition (singing with Jesse McCartney). Patterson said that she would continue to sing. She also encouraged the audience to continue voting for the remaining celebrities because each vote raised money for charity.

=== Recording ===
On February 4, 2008, Patterson signed a recording contract with MusicMind Records, a Chicago-based label. Her single "Temporary Life (Ordinary Girl)" was released on iTunes on March 25, 2008. Her debut album Back to the Beginning was scheduled for release August 5, 2008. However, the CD was not released until more than a year later, on August 25, 2009, and in the interim, Patterson released another single, "Time to Wake Up", on iTunes on February 19, 2009.

On September 10, 2008, a remixed version of Patterson's "Temporary Life (Ordinary Girl)" was played on the Bobby Bones Show. The mixed version featured the new artist Captain Caucasian, a pseudonym for Bobby Bones.

Patterson's song "Here I Am" was featured on the second season of the ABC Family series Make It or Break It, which focused on the lives of teen gymnasts striving to make it to the Olympic Games.

== Personal life ==
Patterson attended school at Spring Creek Academy. On 21 January 2012, Patterson became engaged to strategy consultant Mark Caldwell. They married on November 3, 2012, in Dallas, Texas. They have three children.

== Honors and awards ==
Patterson was chosen for the USA Gymnastics Hall of Fame in 2009. She was inducted to the International Gymnastics Hall of Fame as a member of the Class of 2024.

== See also ==
- Gymnastics at the 2004 Summer Olympics
- United States at the 2004 Summer Olympics
