= Sara Moro =

Spanish artistic gymnast (born 1984)

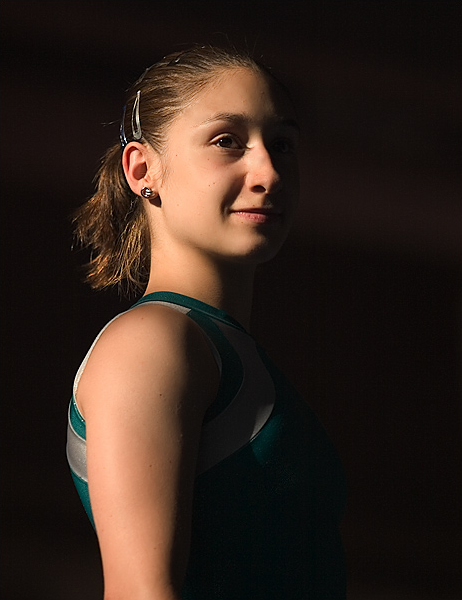
- Sara Moro in 2004

Personal information
- Full name: Sara Moro de Faes
- Born: 11 May 1984 (age 42) Gijón, Asturias

Gymnastics career
- Discipline: Women's artistic gymnastics
- Country represented: (5)
- Club: RGC Covadonga
Medal record
Women's artistic gymnastics
Representing Spain
European Team Championships
| Bronze medal – third place | 2001 Riesa | Team |
Mediterranean Games
| Gold medal – first place | 2001 Tunis | Team |
| Gold medal – first place | 2001 Tunis | All-around |
| Silver medal – second place | 2001 Tunis | Floor exercise |
| Bronze medal – third place | 2001 Tunis | Vault |

Sara Moro de Faes (born 11 May 1984) is a Spanish female artistic gymnast, representing her nation at international competitions.

She participated at the 2000 Summer Olympics and 2004 Summer Olympics. She also competed at world championships, including the 2001 World Artistic Gymnastics Championships and 2003 World Artistic Gymnastics Championships.
