= 2004 United States Olympic trials (gymnastics) =

2004 U.S. Olympic trials
- Venue: Arrowhead Pond of Anaheim
- Location: Anaheim, California
- Date: June 24–27, 2004

The 2004 U.S. Olympic gymnastics team trials were held from June 24 to 27, 2004, at the Arrowhead Pond of Anaheim (now known as the Honda Center) in Anaheim, California.

== Venue ==
The Arrowhead Pond of Anaheim is an indoor arena located in Anaheim, California. The arena is home to the Anaheim Ducks of the National Hockey League.

== Participants ==
The top 12 finishers at the 2004 U.S. National Gymnastics Championships automatically qualified to compete at the Olympic trials:

Name	Hometown	Club
Mohini Bhardwaj	Cincinnati, Ohio	All Olympia
~~Nicole Harris~~ (Note: Qualified to trials but was injured days before the start of competition)	Allentown, Pennsylvania	Parkettes
Terin Humphrey	Bates City, Missouri	GAGE
Allyse Ishino	Santa Ana, California	Charter Oak Gliders
Carly Janiga	Mesa, Arizona	Desert Devils Gymnastics
Courtney Kupets	Gaithersburg, Maryland	Hill's Gymnastics
Courtney McCool	Kansas City, Missouri	GAGE
Tia Orlando	Philadelphia, Pennsylvania	Parkettes
Carly Patterson	Allen, Texas	WOGA
Tasha Schwikert	Las Vegas, Nevada	Gym Cats
Liz Tricase	Itasca, Illinois	Illinois Gymnastics Institute
Tabitha Yim	Irvine, California	Charter Oaks Gliders

The following people were also invited to Olympic trials:

Name	Hometown	Club
Annia Hatch	West Haven, Connecticut	Stars Elite
Katie Heenan	South Riding, Virginia	Capital Gymnastics
Samantha Sheehan	Villa Hills, Kentucky	Cincinnati Gymnastics
Melanie Sinclair	Orlando, Florida	Orlando Metro
Hollie Vise	Dallas, Texas	WOGA

== Broadcast ==
NBC Sports broadcast all nights of competition at the trials.

== Results ==
=== Final standings ===
Event	Gold	Silver	Bronze
Women
Individual all-around	Courtney Kupets	Courtney McCool	Carly Patterson
Vault	Annia Hatch	Mohini Bhardwaj	Liz Tricase
Uneven bars	Courtney Kupets	Tasha Schwikert	Hollie Vise
Balance beam	Courtney McCool	Courtney Kupets	Terin Humphrey
Floor	Carly Patterson	Terin Humphrey	Tabitha Yim
Men
Individual all-around	Paul Hamm	Brett McClure	Sean Townsend

== Olympic team selection ==
The top two finishers automatically qualified to the team. For the women this was Courtney Kupets and Courtney McCool. The rest of the team would be determined after a selection camp was held. Invitees to this camp included: Mohini Bhardwaj, Annia Hatch, Terin Humphrey, Allyse Ishino, Carly Janiga, Carly Patterson, Tasha Schwikert, Liz Tricase, Hollie Vise, and Tabitha Yim. Additionally injury petitions from Nicole Harris, Chellsie Memmel, and Marcia Newby were also accepted. At the conclusion of the selection camp Patterson, Bhardwaj, Hatch, and Humphrey were added to the team with Memmel, Schwikert, and Ishino selected as alternates.

For the men the top two finishers were Paul Hamm and Brett McClure. Additionally Jason Gatson and Morgan Hamm were also named to the men's team immediately following the Olympic trials conclusion. In July Guard Young and Blaine Wilson were added to the team with Stephen McCain and Raj Bhavsar selected as alternates.
