= Real Grupo de Cultura Covadonga =

Spanish sports club

Grupo Covadonga
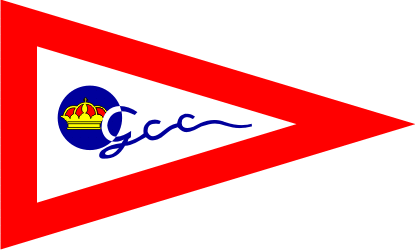
- Full name: Real Grupo de Cultura Covadonga
- Nicknames: El Grupo, Grupo Covadonga
- Founded: 1938
- Based in: Gijón, Asturias, Spain
- Colors: Red and navy
- President: Antonio Corripio
- Members: 33,000
- Website: www.rgcc.es

Real Grupo de Cultura Covadonga is a multisport club based in Gijón, Spain. The club was founded in 1938 and is the biggest sports club in Asturias. It has 33,000 members, more than the most important football clubs of the region (Sporting de Gijón and Real Oviedo).

== History ==
The club was founded on May 10, 1938, with the initial purpose of the club was to create an independent Sports Club. It was based near the beach of San Lorenzo in Gijón. In 1949, Grupo Covadonga purchases lands in the neighbourhood of Las Mestas, near the El Molinón football stadium.

In 2012, Grupo Covadonga was nominated to the Prince of Asturias Awards in the category of Sports.

== Notable sportsmen ==
- Mayte Fernández (archery). 1992 Barcelona Olympics
- Herminio Menéndez (canoeing). 1976 Montreal Olympics (silver medal), 1980 Moscow Olympics (silver and bronze medals)
- Javier Hernanz (canoeing). 2004 Athens Olympics, 2016 Rio Olympics
- María Ángeles Rodríguez (field hockey). 1992 Barcelona Olympics (gold medal)
- Juan Fernández (field hockey). 2008 Beijing Olympics (silver medal)
- María López (field hockey). 2016 Rio Olympics, 2020 Tokyo Olympics
- Mónica Martín (gymnastics). 1996 Atlanta Olympics
- Verónica Castro (gymnastics). 1996 Atlanta Olympics
- Saúl Cofiño (gymnastics). 2000 Sydney Olympics
- José Palacios (gymnastics). 2000 NCAA Champion (Penn State)
- Sara Moro (gymnastics). 2000 Sydney Olympics, 2004 Athens Olympics
- Iván San Miguel (gymnastics). 2008 Beijing Olympics
- Juan de la Puente (handball). 1980 Moscow Olympics, 1984 Los Angeles Olympics, 1988 Seoul Olympics
- Chechu Villaldea (handball). Spanish National Team
- Carlos Ruesga (handball). 2013 World Champion.
- Pablo Carreño (tennis). ATP Tour, 2020 Tokyo Olympics (bronze medal)
- José Arconada (track and field). 1992 Barcelona Olympics
- Carmen Beatriz Miranda (volleyball). 1992 Barcelona Olympics
- Luis Bernardo Martínez (wrestling). 1992 Barcelona Olympics

== Sections ==
Grupo Covadonga has got teams in 18 sports. It also has got a group of traditional dance and a choir.

- Archery
- Basketball
- Basque pelota
- Canoeing
- Chess
- Field hockey

- Gymnastics
- Handball
- Judo
- Karate
- Mountaineering
- Olympic weightlifting

- Rugby
- Swimming
- Tennis
- Track and field
- Volleyball
- Wrestling

== Volleyball team ==
Grupo Covadonga
- Full name: Real Grupo de Cultura Covadonga
- Ground: Polideportivo Braulio García, Gijón, Asturias (Capacity: 1,331)
- Chairman: (Spain) Antonio Corripio
- Manager: (Spain) Saúl Pérez
- League: Superliga 2
- 2013–14: Superliga 2, 3rd

Uniforms
Home	Away

There's only women volleyball. The team currently plays in Superliga 2 and it played the Superliga Femenina de Voleibol during two seasons. In 2012 was runner-up of the Copa Princesa de Asturias.

Its young teams won several Spanish championships.

=== Season by season ===
Season	Tier	League	Pos.	Cups
2000–01	1	Superliga	11th	
2001–02	1	Superliga	13th	
2002–07	2	Liga FEV		
2007–08	2	Superliga 2	7th	
2008–09	2	Superliga 2	6th (Note: Resigned to their place in Superliga 2)	
2009–10	3	Liga FEV		
2010–11	3	Liga FEV	1st	
2011–12	2	Superliga 2	5th	Copa Princesa runner-up
2012–13	2	Superliga 2	6th	Copa Princesa semifinalist
2013–14	2	Superliga 2	3rd	Copa Princesa semifinalist
2014–15	2	Superliga 2	5th	
2015–16	2	Superliga 2	4th	
2016–17	2	Superliga 2	2nd (Note: Resigned to promotion.)	Copa Princesa semifinalist
2017–18	2	Superliga 2	8th	
