= Yulia Tarasenka =

Belarusian artistic gymnast (born 1985)

- Born: 14 April 1985 (age 41)

Gymnastics career
- Discipline: Women's artistic gymnastics
- Country represented: Belarus; (2004)
Medal record
European Team Championships
Bronze medal – third place	2003 Moscow	Team

Yulia Tarasenka (born 14 April 1985) is a Belarusian female artistic gymnast, representing her nation at international competitions.

She participated at the 2004 Summer Olympics, and the 2003 World Artistic Gymnastics Championships.
