= Gymnastics at the 2001 Mediterranean Games =

- Location: Tunis, Tunisia

Gymnastics were contested at the 2001 Mediterranean Games.

== Medal winners ==
=== Men's ===
Event	Gold		Silver		Bronze	
Individual all-around	ESP Víctor Cano	53.525	FRA Cédric Guille	53.450	ITA Alberto Busnari	53.250
Teams all-around	France; Olivier Esquer; Cédric Guille; Dimitri Karbanenko; Johan Mounard; Sébastien Tayac	160.675	Italy; Matteo Angioletti; Alberto Busnari; Igor Cassina; Andrea Coppolino; Enrico Pozzo	160.400	Spain; Alejandro Barrenechea; Víctor Cano; Saul Cofino; Oriol Combarros; Andreu Vivó	158.175
Floor	FRA Dimitri Karbanenko	9.325	ITA Enrico Pozzo	9.300	GRE Konstantinos Barbakis	9.275
Pommel Horse	ALG Sid Ali Ferdjani	9.275	ITA Alberto Busnari	9.212	ITA Igor Cassina	9.137
Rings	GRE Dimosthenis Tambakos	9.725	ITA Andrea Coppolino	9.612	EGY Walid Elderiny	9.537
Vault	FRA Dimitri Karbanenko	9.256	TUR Ümit Şamiloğlu	9.231	EGY Ali Raouf	9.200
Bars	GRE Vasileios Tsolakidis	9.637	ESP Andreu Vivó	9.487	SLO Mitja Petkovšek	9.175
Horizontal bar	GRE Vlasios Maras	9.737	ESP Andreu Vivó	9.675	SLO Aljaž Pegan	9.625

=== Women's ===
Event	Gold		Silver		Bronze	
Individual all-around	ESP Sara Moro	37.237	ITA Ilaria Colombo	36.212	ESP Elena Gómez	35.962
Teams all-around	Spain; Elena Gómez; Marta Cusido; Sara Moro; Alba Planas; Susana García	109.075	Italy; Cristina Cavalli; Maria Teresa Gargano; Ilaria Colombo; Monica Bergamelli; Giorgia Denti	107.125	France; Nelly Soupe; Melodie Vaudable; Clelia Coutzac; Marlene Peron; Delphine Regease	104.800
Floor	ESP Elena Gómez	9.450	ESP Sara Moro	9.437	ITA Maria Teresa Gargano	9.000
Vault	TUN Leonie Marzouk	9.043	ITA Monica Bergamelli	8.993	ESP Sara Moro	8.9000
Uneven bars	ESP Susana García	9.587	ITA Monica Bergamelli	9.112	FRA Clelia Coutzac	8.775
Balance beam	ITA Ilaria Colombo	9.387	FRA Marlene Peron; ITA Maria Teresa Gargano	9.087		

== Medal table ==
Rank	Nation	Gold	Silver	Bronze	Total
1	Spain (ESP)	5	3	3	11
2	France (FRA)	3	2	2	7
3	Greece (GRE)	3	0	1	4
4	Italy (ITA)	1	9	3	13
5	Algeria (ALG)	1	0	0	1
5	Tunisia (TUN)	1	0	0	1
7	Turkey (TUR)	0	1	0	1
8	Egypt (EGY)	0	0	2	2
8	Slovenia (SLO)	0	0	2	2
Totals (9 entries)		14	15	13	42
