= 2001 European Team Gymnastics Championships =

Gymnastics competition

The 2001 European Team Gymnastics Championships was the inaugural edition of the European Team Gymnastics Championships. The competition formed teams of athletes representing different nations, combining events from men's and women's artistic gymnastics, as well as rhythmic gymnastics. The event was held from May 19 to May 20 in Riesa, Germany. The competition was organized by the European Union of Gymnastics. The event should not be confused with the European TeamGym Championships.

== Medalists ==
Event	Gold	Silver	Bronze
Team	Russia; Nikolai Kryukov; Yevgeni Podgorny; Elena Zamolodchikova; Ludmila Ezhova; Alina Kabaeva; Irina Tchachina	Ukraine; Alexander Beresch; Olexander Svitlichni; Alona Kvasha; Olha Rozshchupkina; Anna Bessonova; Tamara Yerofeeva	Spain; Víctor Cano; Alejandro Barrenechea; Sara Moro; Laura Martínez Ruiz; Esther Domínguez; Almudena Cid Tostado

== See also ==
- 1997 European Gymnastics Masters
- 1999 European Gymnastics Masters
- 2003 European Team Gymnastics Championships
- European Gymnastics Championships
