= 2003 European Team Gymnastics Championships =

International gymnastics competition

The 2003 European Team Gymnastics Championships was the second edition of the European Team Gymnastics Championships. The competition formed teams of athletes representing different nations, combining events from men's and women's artistic gymnastics, as well as rhythmic gymnastics. The event was held from May 3 to May 4 in Moscow, Russia. The competition was organized by the European Union of Gymnastics.

== Medalists ==
Event	Gold	Silver	Bronze
Team	Russia; Alexei Nemov; Alexei Bondarenko; Anna Pavlova; Svetlana Khorkina; Alina Kabaeva; Irina Tchachina	Ukraine; Alexander Beresch; Roman Zozulya; Alona Kvasha; Irina Yarotska; Anna Bessonova; Natalia Godunko	Belarus; Dzmitry Kaspiarovich; Denis Savenkov; Tatiana Zharganova; Yulia Tarasenka; Inna Zhukova; Liubov Charkashyna

== See also ==
- 1997 European Gymnastics Masters
- 1999 European Gymnastics Masters
- 2001 European Team Gymnastics Championships
- European Gymnastics Championships
