= 2002 World Artistic Gymnastics Championships =

Gymnastics competition

- Venue: Főnix Hall
- Location: Debrecen, Hungary
- Start date: November 20, 2002
- End date: November 24, 2002

The 36th Artistic Gymnastics World Championships were held in Debrecen, Hungary, in 2002 at Főnix Hall.

The team and all-around events were not contested at the 2002 Worlds. The format was similar to that of the 1992 and 1996 Worlds, with medals being awarded for the individual WAG and MAG apparatus. There were three rounds of competition: the preliminary round open to everyone; the semi-finals open to the top sixteen qualifiers; and the finals for the top eight gymnasts.

== Results ==
Event	Gold	Silver	Bronze
Men
Floor	(Romania) Marian Drăgulescu	(Bulgaria) Yordan Yovchev	(United States) Paul Hamm
Pommel horse	(Romania) Marius Urzică	(China) Xiao Qin	(Japan) Takehiro Kashima
Rings	(Hungary) Szilveszter Csollány	(Bulgaria) Yordan Yovchev	(Italy) Matteo Morandi
Vault	(China) Li Xiaopeng	(Poland) Leszek Blanik	(China) Yang Wei
Parallel Bars	(China) Li Xiaopeng	(Slovenia) Mitja Petkovšek	(Belarus) Alexei Sinkevich
Horizontal bar	(Greece) Vlasios Maras	(Belarus) Ivan Ivankov (Slovenia) Aljaž Pegan	none awarded
Women
Vault	(Russia) Elena Zamolodchikova	(Russia) Natalia Ziganshina	(Uzbekistan) Oksana Chusovitina
Uneven bars	(United States) Courtney Kupets	(Romania) Oana Petrovschi	(Russia) Ludmila Ezhova
Balance beam	(United States) Ashley Postell	(Romania) Oana Ban	(Ukraine) Irina Yarotska
Floor	(Spain) Elena Gómez	(Netherlands) Verona van de Leur	(United States) Samantha Sheehan

== Men ==
=== Floor Exercise ===
Rank	Gymnast	Total
1st place, gold medalist(s)	Marian Drăgulescu (ROU)	9.712
2nd place, silver medalist(s)	Yordan Yovchev (BUL)	9.675
3rd place, bronze medalist(s)	Paul Hamm (USA)	9.625
4	Diego Hypólito (BRA)	9.575
5	Ioan Suciu (ROU)	9.562
5	Roman Zozulya (UKR)	9.562
7	Yang Wei (CHN)	8.550
DQ	Gervasio Deferr (ESP)*	9.700

- In July 2003, Gervasio Deferr was stripped of his silver medal after testing positive for marijuana prior to the 2002 World Championships.

=== Pommel Horse ===
Rank	Gymnast	Total
1st place, gold medalist(s)	Marius Urzică (ROU)	9.787
2nd place, silver medalist(s)	Xiao Qin (CHN)	9.750
3rd place, bronze medalist(s)	Takehiro Kashima (JPN)	9.687
4	Teng Haibin (CHN)	9.662
5	Eric Casimir (FRA)	9.650
6	Nikolai Kryukov (RUS)	9.625
6	Ioan Suciu (ROU)	9.625
8	Paul Hamm (USA)	9.050

=== Rings ===
Rank	Gymnast	Total
1st place, gold medalist(s)	Szilveszter Csollány (HUN)	9.725
2nd place, silver medalist(s)	Yordan Yovchev (BUL)	9.675
3rd place, bronze medalist(s)	Matteo Morandi (ITA)	9.650
4	Hiroyuki Tomita (JPN)	9.637
5	Ivan Ivankov (BLR)	9.637
6	Andrea Coppolino (ITA)	9.625
7	Timur Kurbanbayev (KAZ)	9.600
8	Jeffrey Johnson (USA)	9.550

=== Vault ===
Rank	Gymnast	Total
1st place, gold medalist(s)	Li Xiaopeng (CHN)	9.818
2nd place, silver medalist(s)	Leszek Blanik (POL)	9.675
3rd place, bronze medalist(s)	Yang Wei (CHN)	9.631
4	Kyle Shewfelt (CAN)	9.512
5	Benoit Caranobe (FRA)	9.474
6	Yernar Yerimbetov (KAZ)	9.400
7	Marian Drăgulescu (ROU)	9.374
8	Róbert Gál (HUN)	9.212

=== Parallel Bars ===
Rank	Gymnast	Total
1st place, gold medalist(s)	Li Xiaopeng (CHN)	9.812
2nd place, silver medalist(s)	Mitja Petkovšek (SLO)	9.787
3rd place, bronze medalist(s)	Alexei Sinkevich (BLR)	9.712
4	Huang Xu (CHN)	9.612
5	Brett McClure (USA)	9.562
6	Ilia Giorgadze (GEO)	9.550
7	Andreu Vivó (ESP)	9.487
8	Runar Alexandersson (ISL)	7.500

=== Horizontal Bar ===
Rank	Gymnast	Total
1st place, gold medalist(s)	Vlasios Maras (GRE)	9.725
2nd place, silver medalist(s)	Ivan Ivankov (BLR)	9.700
2nd place, silver medalist(s)	Aljaž Pegan (SLO)	9.700
4	Cédric Guille (FRA)	9.675
5	Isao Yoneda (JPN)	9.662
6	Philippe Rizzo (AUS)	9.650
7	Paul Hamm (USA)	8.887
8	Yang Tae-Seok (KOR)	5.900

== Women ==
=== Vault ===
Rank	Gymnast	Vault 1	Vault 2	Total
1st place, gold medalist(s)	Elena Zamolodchikova (RUS)	9.450	9.437	9.443
2nd place, silver medalist(s)	Natalia Ziganshina (RUS)	9.412	9.375	9.393
3rd place, bronze medalist(s)	Oksana Chusovitina (UZB)	9.462	9.312	9.387
4	Oana Petrovschi (ROU)	9.387	9.337	9.362
5	Sabina Cojocar (ROU)	9.287	9.387	9.337
6	Ashley Postell (USA)	9.337	9.125	9.231
7	Verona van de Leur (NED)	9.262	9.112	9.187
8	Alona Kvasha (UKR)	9.262	8.912	9.087

=== Uneven Bars ===
Rank	Gymnast	Total
1st place, gold medalist(s)	Courtney Kupets (USA)	9.550
2nd place, silver medalist(s)	Oana Petrovschi (ROU)	9.525
3rd place, bronze medalist(s)	Ludmila Ezhova (RUS)	9.375
4	Elizabeth Tweddle (GBR)	9.312
5	Laura van Leeuwen (NED)	8.612
6	Tatiana Zharganova (BLR)	8.187
7	Svetlana Khorkina (RUS)	7.387
8	Irina Yarotska (UKR)	7.000

=== Balance Beam ===
Rank	Gymnast	Total
1st place, gold medalist(s)	Ashley Postell (USA)	9.537
2nd place, silver medalist(s)	Oana Ban (ROU)	9.350
3rd place, bronze medalist(s)	Irina Yarotska (UKR)	9.212
4	Svetlana Khorkina (RUS)	9.125
5	Evgeniya Kuznetsova (BUL)	9.075
6	Ludmila Ezhova (RUS)	8.975
7	Ilaria Colombo (ITA)	8.750
8	Oksana Chusovitina (UZB)	8.312

=== Floor Exercise ===
Rank	Gymnast	Total
1st place, gold medalist(s)	Elena Gómez (ESP)	9.487
2nd place, silver medalist(s)	Verona van de Leur (NED)	9.350
3rd place, bronze medalist(s)	Samantha Sheehan (USA)	9.325
4	Oana Ban (ROU)	9.275
5	Daniele Hypólito (BRA)	9.237
6	Oksana Chusovitina (UZB)	9.137
7	Natalia Ziganshina (RUS)	8.862
8	Brenda Magana (MEX)	8.462

== Medal count ==
=== Overall ===
Rank	Nation	Gold	Silver	Bronze	Total
1	Romania (ROU)	2	2	0	4
2	China (CHN)	2	1	1	4
3	United States (USA)	2	0	2	4
4	Russia (RUS)	1	1	1	3
5	Greece (GRE)	1	0	0	1
5	Hungary (HUN)	1	0	0	1
5	Spain (ESP)	1	0	0	1
8	Bulgaria (BUL)	0	2	0	2
8	Slovenia (SLO)	0	2	0	2
10	Belarus (BLR)	0	1	1	2
11	Netherlands (NED)	0	1	0	1
11	Poland (POL)	0	1	0	1
13	Italy (ITA)	0	0	1	1
13	Japan (JPN)	0	0	1	1
13	Ukraine (UKR)	0	0	1	1
13	Uzbekistan (UZB)	0	0	1	1
Totals (16 entries)		10	11	9	30

=== Men ===
Rank	Nation	Gold	Silver	Bronze	Total
1	China	2	1	1	4
2	Romania	2	0	0	2
3	Greece	1	0	0	1
3	Hungary	1	0	0	1
5	Bulgaria	0	2	0	2
5	Slovenia	0	2	0	2
7	Belarus	0	1	1	2
8	Poland	0	1	0	1
9	Italy	0	0	1	1
9	Japan	0	0	1	1
9	United States	0	0	1	1
Totals (11 entries)		6	7	5	18

=== Women ===
Rank	Nation	Gold	Silver	Bronze	Total
1	United States	2	0	1	3
2	Russia	1	1	1	3
3	Spain	1	0	0	1
4	Romania	0	2	0	2
5	Netherlands	0	1	0	1
6	Ukraine	0	0	1	1
6	Uzbekistan	0	0	1	1
Totals (7 entries)		4	4	4	12
