= Ludmila Ezhova =

Russian gymnast (born 1982)

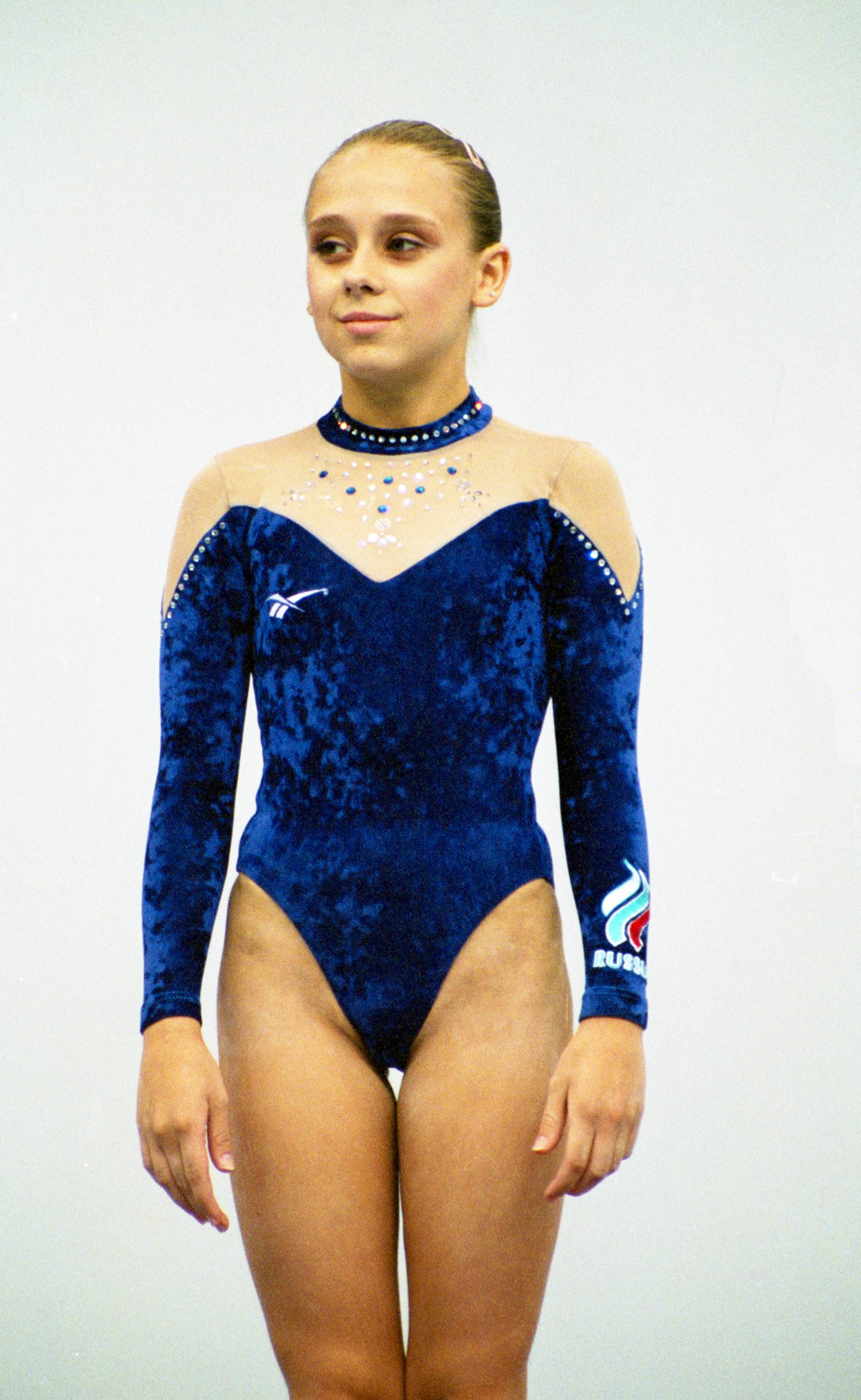

Personal information
- Full name: Ludmilla Ezhova Grebenkova
- Alternative names: Lyudmila Yezhova; Lyudmila Grebenkova
- Born: March 4, 1982 (age 44)
- Height: 4 ft 10 in (147 cm)

Gymnastics career
- Discipline: Women's artistic gymnastics
- Country represented: Russia
- Head coach: Leonid Arkaev
- Retired: 2008
Medal record
Event	1st	2nd	3rd
Olympic Games	0	0	1
World Championships	0	2	2
European Championships	2	1	1
European Team Championships	1	0	0
Representing Russia
Olympic Games
Bronze medal – third place	2004 Athens	Team
World Championships
Silver medal – second place	2001 Ghent	Team
Silver medal – second place	2001 Ghent	Balance Beam
Bronze medal – third place	2002 Debrecen	Uneven Bars
Bronze medal – third place	2003 Anaheim	Balance Beam
European Championships
Gold medal – first place	2002 Patras	Team
Gold medal – first place	2002 Patras	Balance Beam
Silver medal – second place	1998 St. Petersburg	Team
Bronze medal – third place	1998 St. Petersburg	Balance Beam
European Team Championships
Gold medal – first place	2001 Riesa	Team

Ludmila Ezhova Grebenkova (Людмила Ежова Гребенкова (Lyudmila Yezhova Grebenkova), born 4 March 1982) is a Russian former competitive gymnast. She won bronze in the team event at the 2004 Summer Olympics and four medals at the World Championships.

== Career ==
Ezhova was a mainstay of the Russian team from the late 1990s to the mid-2000s. She also represented Russia at the 2008 Olympics in Beijing where she competed only balance beam. She was particularly noted for her work on balance beam where she was a four (4) time world and European medalist, including a gold medal. Her balance beam routines were characterized by a wide array of difficult acrobatic skills connected in immediate, unusual sequencing.

In 1997, Ezhova placed 8th in the all-around at Russian Championships. The following year she placed 10th in the all-around at the Russian Cup. In the Spring of 1998, she competed on uneven bars and balance beam in the team final at European Championships in Saint Petersburg, Russia. Individually, she earned a bronze medal on balance beam, tying with Romanian Simona Amânar. At the 1999 Russian Cup, Ezhova placed 9th in the all-around. Ezhova was not named to the World Team for Russia. In 2000, she was not named to the Russian team for European Championships or the Olympic Games.

Ezhova made the team for the 2001 World Championships in Ghent, Belgium. She competed on uneven bars, balance beam and floor exercise in the team final and helped earn the silver medal. Individually she earned a silver medal on balance beam. At the 2002 European Championships in Patras, Greece, she helped the Russian team earn the gold medal by competing on uneven bars and balance beam. Individually she won the gold medal on balance beam and placed 7th on the uneven bars. That same year she made her second World Championships team. There was no team competition at the 2002 World Championships but she earned a bronze medal on uneven bars and placed 6th place on balance beam. In 2003, Ezhova placed 13th at the Russian Championships. At the 2003 World Championships in Anaheim, California, the Russian team of which Ezhova was a member, greatly faltered and placed 6th in the team competition. Individually, however, she earned a bronze medal on balance beam. Ezhova did not compete on the European Championships team. Later that year she made the team for the 2004 Athens Summer Olympics. At the Olympics, Ezhova competed on uneven bars and balance beam in both qualifications and the team final. The Russian team earned a bronze medal in the team competition. Individually, Ezhova did not advance to any individual finals.

In 2008 Grebenkova returned to gymnastics to compete at the 2008 Beijing Summer Olympics. Here she competed for the team on balance beam. The Russian team placed 4th in the team final.

== Eponymous skill ==
Ezhova has one eponymous skill listed in the Code of Points.

Apparatus	Name	Description	Difficulty (Note: Valid for the 2025–2028 Code of Points)
Uneven bars	Ejova	Swing backward release and ½ turn (180°) in flight between the bars to catch low bar in hang	D (0.4)

== Post-retirement ==
Ezhova-Grebenkova was a team and rec coach at Southeastern Gymnastics in Charlotte, North Carolina, along with her husband Georgy Grebenkov, also a former Olympic gymnast. Up until early 2018 she was a gymnastics coach at WOGA Gymnastics.

As of spring of 2018 she and her husband own and coach at Golden Grip Gymnastics in Plano, Texas.

== Competitive history ==
Year	Event	Team	AA	VT	UB	BB	FX
1998	European Championships	2nd place, silver medalist(s)				3rd place, bronze medalist(s)	
2001
2001	World Championships	2nd place, silver medalist(s)	26		6	2nd place, silver medalist(s)	
2002	European Championships	1st place, gold medalist(s)			7	1st place, gold medalist(s)	2nd place, silver medalist(s)
2002	World Championships				3rd place, bronze medalist(s)	6	
2003
2003	World Championships	6				3rd place, bronze medalist(s)	
2004
2004	Olympic Games	3rd place, bronze medalist(s)					
2004	World Cup Final				6	5	
2006
2006	World Cup Final				8	8	
2008
2008	Olympic Games	4					

Year	Competition description	Location	Apparatus	Rank-Final	Score-Final	Rank-Qualifying	Score-Qualifying
2008	Olympic Games	Beijing	Team	4	180.625	3	244.400
2008	Olympic Games	Beijing	Balance beam			37	14.600
2006	World Cup Final	São Paulo	Uneven bars	8	9.950		
2006	World Cup Final	São Paulo	Balance beam	8	14.200		
2004	World Cup Final	Birmingham	Uneven bars	6	9.350		
2004	World Cup Final	Birmingham	Balance beam	5	9.437		
2004	Olympic Games	Athens	Team	3	113.235	4	149.420
2004	Olympic Games	Athens	Uneven bars			23	9.475
2004	Olympic Games	Athens	Balance beam			15	9.462
2003	World Championships	Anaheim	Team	6	108.985	5	145.572
2003	World Championships	Anaheim	Uneven bars			94	8.537
2003	World Championships	Anaheim	Balance beam	3	9.550	6	9.425
2002	World Championships	Debrecen	Uneven bars	3	9.375		
2002	World Championships	Debrecen	Uneven bars (Semi-final)			3	9.512
2002	World Championships	Debrecen	Uneven bars (Qualification)			3	9.575
2002	World Championships	Debrecen	Balance beam	6	8.975		
2002	World Championships	Debrecen	Balance beam (Semi-final)			2	9.612
2002	World Championships	Debrecen	Balance beam (Qualification)			2	9.562
2002	European Championships	Patras	Team	1	111.833		
2002	European Championships	Patras	Uneven bars	7	8.700	3	9.437
2002	European Championships	Patras	Balance beam	1	9.562	1	9.625
2001	World Championships	Ghent	Team	2	109.023	4	144.134
2001	World Championships	Ghent	All-around	26	34.774	10	36.011
2001	World Championships	Ghent	Vault			91	8.612
2001	World Championships	Ghent	Uneven bars	6	8.625	4	9.300
2001	World Championships	Ghent	Balance beam	2	9.650	1	9.612
2001	World Championships	Ghent	Floor exercise			67	8.487
1998	European Championships	Saint Petersburg	Team	2	112.720		
1998	European Championships	Saint Petersburg	Uneven bars			23	9.250
1998	European Championships	Saint Petersburg	Balance beam	3	9.662	4	9.687

== See also ==
- List of Olympic female gymnasts for Russia
