= Maria Kryuchkova =

Russian artistic gymnast

- Full name: Maria Yevgenyevna Kryuchkova
- Born: 7 July 1988 Rostov-on-Don, Russia
- Died: 8 March 2015 (aged 26) Rostov-on-Don
- Height: 1.50 m (4 ft 11 in)

Gymnastics career
- Discipline: Women's artistic gymnastics
- Country represented: Russia
- Club: Olympic Reserve; Rostov-on-Don
- Head coach: Olga Sagina
Medal record
Representing Russia
Olympic Games
Bronze medal – third place	2004 Athens	Team

Maria Yevgenyevna Kryuchkova (Russian: Мария Евгеньевна Крючкова; 7 July 1988 – 8 March 2015) was a Russian gymnast. She won a bronze medal in the team event at the 2004 Summer Olympics.

== Career ==
Kryuchkova competed at the 2002 Junior European Championships in Patras, Greece, winning team gold and placing sixth on floor. In 2003, she won team bronze at the WOGA Classic in Texas, USA. Later that year, she swept the Friendship Classic. In 2004, she did not make the Russian team for the European Championships, but won gold on floor, and placed fifth in the all-around and eighth on vault at the Russian Cup. She was named to the Russian team for the Olympic Games in Athens, where she contributed to a team bronze medal.

== Death ==
Kryuchkova died of an embolism on 8 March 2015, at age 26.

== Competitive history ==
Year	Competition Description	Location	Apparatus	Rank-Final	Score-Final	Rank-Qualifying	Score-Qualifying
2004	Olympic Games	Athens	Team	3	113.235	4	149.420
2004	Olympic Games	Athens	Floor Exercise			79	7.975

== See also ==
- List of Olympic female gymnasts for Russia
