= Renske Endel =

Dutch gymnast

- Full name: Renske Endel
- Born: 13 July 1983 (age 43) Noord-Scharwoude, The Netherlands

Gymnastics career
- Discipline: Women's artistic gymnastics
- Country represented: Netherlands
- Former coach: Gerrit Beltman
- Retired: 2004
Medal record
World Championships
Silver medal – second place	2001 Ghent	Uneven bars
European Championships
Silver medal – second place	2002 Patras	Team
Silver medal – second place	2002 Patras	Uneven bars

Renske Endel (born 13 July 1983, Noord-Scharwoude) is a Dutch former artistic gymnast. She won the silver medal on uneven bars at the 2001 World Championships, which was the first world medal won by a Dutch gymnast since 1903. She was unable to compete at the 2004 Olympic Games due to injury and retired shortly afterwards.

Endel works as a motivational speaker and acrobat at Corpus Acrobatics in Amsterdam.
