= Anna Pavlova (gymnast) =

Russian-born artistic gymnast (born 1987)

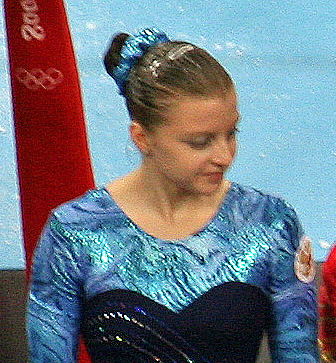
- Pavlova at the 2008 Olympics

Personal information
- Full name: Anna Anatolyevna Pavlova
- Nicknames: Anya, Pavs
- Born: 6 September 1987 (age 39) Orekhovo-Zuyevo, Russian SSR, Soviet Union
- Height: 152 cm (5 ft 0 in)

Gymnastics career
- Discipline: Women's artistic gymnastics
- Country represented: Azerbaijan (2013–2015)
- Former countries represented: Russia (2000–2008)
- Club: Dinamo
- Head coach: Nataliya Pavlova
- Assistant coach: Leonid Arkaev
- Retired: 15 December 2015
Medal record
Event	1st	2nd	3rd
Olympic Games	0	0	2
World Championships	0	0	1
World Cup Final	0	0	1
European Championships	0	5	2
European Team Championships	1	0	0
Total	1	5	6
Representing Azerbaijan
European Championships
Silver medal – second place	2014 Sofia	Vault
FIG World Cup
Gold medal – first place	2014 Ljubljana	Uneven Bars
Representing Russia
Olympic Games
Bronze medal – third place	2004 Athens	Team
Bronze medal – third place	2004 Athens	Vault
World Championships
Bronze medal – third place	2006 Aarhus	Team
World Cup Final
Bronze medal – third place	2004 Birmingham	Vault
Goodwill Games
Silver medal – second place	2001 Brisbane	Balance Beam
European Championships
Silver medal – second place	2004 Amsterdam	Vault
Silver medal – second place	2005 Debrecen	All-around
Silver medal – second place	2005 Debrecen	Vault
Silver medal – second place	2008 Clermont	Team
Bronze medal – third place	2004 Amsterdam	Team
Bronze medal – third place	2005 Debrecen	Balance beam
European Team Championships
Gold medal – first place	2003 Moscow	Team

Anna Anatolyevna Pavlova (Russian: А́нна Анато́льевна Па́влова; born 6 September 1987) is a Russian-born artistic gymnast who won two bronze medals at the 2004 Olympic Games in Athens, and represented Russia in other international competitions. In 2002 she won the Russian National Championships.

Pavlova competed for Azerbaijan from 2013, winning silver at the 2014 European Championships on vault. She was well known for her balletic style and clean technique. Pavlova retired in 2015 at the age of 28.

== Career ==
=== 2000–2002 ===
Pavlova first emerged on the international gymnastics scene in 2000, winning a gold medal on the uneven bars at the Junior European Championships. Although she was too young to compete as a senior at the World Championships in 2001, she was allowed to participate in the Goodwill Games, where she earned a silver medal on the balance beam.

In 2002, still too young to compete internationally as a senior, Pavlova won the Russian National Championships.

=== 2003 ===
Pavlova competed at the 2003 World Championships during her first year as a senior gymnast, and the Russian team finished sixth. Pavlova did not earn an individual medal; she had qualified for the individual all-around, vault and floor finals, but mistakes prevented her from placing among the top three.

=== 2004 ===
In 2004, Pavlova competed in the European Championships team competition. She fell from the uneven bars, which she was a favorite to win, and did not qualify for the all-around. Later that year, Pavlova claimed the Russian national title and made the Russian Olympic team.

At the 2004 Summer Olympics in Athens, Greece, Pavlova had her best performance to date. The Russian team fought their way back onto the medal podium, finishing third behind Romania and the United States. In the individual all-around, she placed fourth and missed the bronze medal by a fraction, 0.025, behind China's Zhang Nan. Pavlova won an individual bronze medal on the vault during the event finals, narrowly missing silver, whilst a mistake in beam finals cost her a medal. She finished fourth behind Romania's Alexandra Georgiana Eremia. Her floor music at the Olympics was "Winter" by Bond.

=== 2005–2006 ===
Pavlova is one of the few Russian gymnasts from the 2004 Olympic team who chose to continue competing; she won silver all-around at the 2005 European Championships. She also competed in the 2005 World Championships in Melbourne, Australia, where she qualified to the all-around final, as well as the vault and beam apparatus finals. The following year, Pavlova competed at the 2006 World Championships, where she won a bronze medal with the Russian team. She once again qualified to the all-around, vault and beam finals.

=== 2008 ===
Pavlova was named to the Russian Olympic team for the 2008 Summer Olympics. On 10 August 2008, in the preliminary round, she performed her floor routine to "Exodus" by Maksim. She qualified fifth for the all-around final and also made the finals on vault, beam and floor. In the team final, Russia finished fourth; Romania won the bronze. In the vault final, Pavlova scored 0 on her second vault because she started before the green light was lit. In the floor final, she was still unsettled from the vault competition and did not perform well. Two days later, she finished fourth in the balance beam final, 0.050 behind China's Cheng Fei.

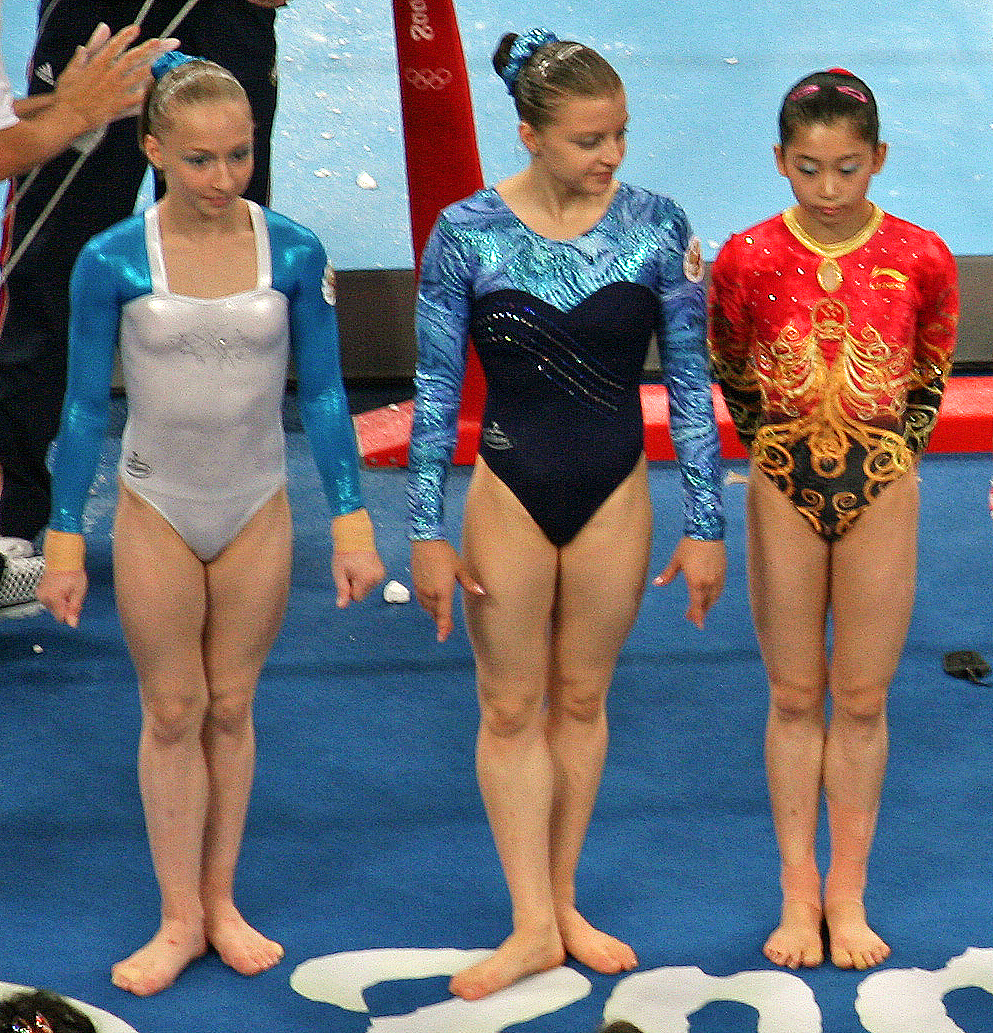
Pavlova (centre) at the 2008 Olympics in Beijing

In November 2008, Pavlova tore two ligaments in her knee during her beam dismount at the DTB World Cup event in Stuttgart. Surgery was required to reattach the ligaments. Pavlova told a Russian sports website, "I hope, of course, that I'll be able to return to gymnastics, but I don't have full confidence in that yet."

Before her injury, Pavlova had placed third on vault in Stuttgart. At the time of the injury, she was ranked third in the world on beam and vault.

=== 2009–2010 ===
In August 2009, Pavlova resumed training. At the end of September, she began competing at the local level. She participated in the All Russia Dinamo competition and won gold on the uneven bars and bronze on the balance beam. After having competed at several local competitions, her first big meet was scheduled to be the 2009 Voronin Memorial. Her father died just a few days before the event, and she had to withdraw to be with family.

Pavlova appeared at the 2010 Russian Nationals in March with a heavily bandaged knee. Although she did not compete full-difficulty routines, she placed a respectable 10th in the individual all-around, and she won the gold medal with her team, the Central Federal District. She posted the highest score on vault to qualify for the event final, where she finished 5th.

=== 2011 ===
In 2011, Pavlova competed in the 2011 Trnava Cup, finishing second behind Romanian Larisa Iordache. Later that year, she competed in the Voronin Cup, finishing 5th in the all-around. She finished third in vault finals, despite a fall on her second vault, a layout Podkopayeva (Yurchenko 1/2 turn on, layout front somersault 1/2).

=== Nationality change ===
"The decision to move to another team appeared quite recently. I was training hard, competing, I was trying hard, but despite my results I have provided during the selection competitions for the past several years, I haven’t been included even into the reserve for the Russian National team, not mentioning the selection for the international competitions."

— Sportbox, 2013

Pavlova began to compete for Azerbaijan in November 2013, saying that Russian gymnastics did not give her sufficient scope. She said that she had always been interested in international competition, and Russian gymnastics did not give her the opportunities she wanted.

=== 2014 ===
Pavlova was selected to compete at the 2014 European Women's Artistic Gymnastics Championships along with another former Russian gymnast, Yulia Inshina. She qualified second into the vault finals behind Giulia Steingruber with a score of 14.516. In the vault finals, she scored a 14.583 which earned her the silver medal. This was her first medal at a major international meet since 2008 and the first medal she won competing for Azerbaijan.

=== 2015: Retirement ===
On 15 December 2015, it was announced that Pavlova would retire from elite gymnastics. She has expressed desire to continue in the sport, as a gymnastics coach with her mother.

== Floor music ==
- 2008–2010: "Exodus" by Maksim Mrvica
- 2006–2007: "Juno and Avos" by Alexei Rybnikov
- 2006: "Allegretto" by Bond
- 2004–2005: "Wintersun" by Bond
- 2003: "Korobushka" by Bond
- 2000: "Smuglyanka" by Shvedov

== Competitive history ==
Year	Event	Team	AA	VT	UB	BB	FX
Representing Russia
2003	European Team Championships	1st place, gold medalist(s)					
2003	World Championships	6	10	5			7
2004
2004	European Championships	3rd place, bronze medalist(s)		2nd place, silver medalist(s)			
2004	Olympic Games	3rd place, bronze medalist(s)	4	3rd place, bronze medalist(s)		4	
2004	World Cup Final			3rd place, bronze medalist(s)		8	
2005
2005	European Championships		2nd place, silver medalist(s)	2nd place, silver medalist(s)		3rd place, bronze medalist(s)	
2005	World Championships		7	5		6	
2006
2006	World Championships	3rd place, bronze medalist(s)	19	5		4	
2006	World Cup Final			4		4	
2008
2008	European Championships	2nd place, silver medalist(s)					
2008	Olympic Games	4	7	8		4	8
2011	National Championships		2nd place, silver medalist(s)	2nd place, silver medalist(s)	6	6	6
2011	Russian Cup		8	1st place, gold medalist(s)			
2012	National Championships	2nd place, silver medalist(s)	5	1st place, gold medalist(s)		6	8
2012	Russian Cup	5	5	1st place, gold medalist(s)		5	5
Representing Azerbaijan
2013	National Championships	1st place, gold medalist(s)	7	3rd place, bronze medalist(s)		5	4
2013	Gym Festival Trnava		2nd place, silver medalist(s)	2nd place, silver medalist(s)	3rd place, bronze medalist(s)	3rd place, bronze medalist(s)	1st place, gold medalist(s)
2013	Russian Cup	3rd place, bronze medalist(s)	3rd place, bronze medalist(s)	8		2nd place, silver medalist(s)	4
2013	Voronin Cup	2nd place, silver medalist(s)	2nd place, silver medalist(s)	1st place, gold medalist(s)	2nd place, silver medalist(s)	3rd place, bronze medalist(s)	3rd place, bronze medalist(s)
2014	Ljubljana World Cup				1st place, gold medalist(s)	4	
2014	European Championships			2nd place, silver medalist(s)			
2014	Gym Festival Trnava		1st place, gold medalist(s)	1st place, gold medalist(s)	3rd place, bronze medalist(s)	1st place, gold medalist(s)	4
2014	International Bosphorus Tournament		1st place, gold medalist(s)	1st place, gold medalist(s)	1st place, gold medalist(s)	1st place, gold medalist(s)	
2014	World Championships	30	70				
2014	Voronin Cup	4	3rd place, bronze medalist(s)	3rd place, bronze medalist(s)	3rd place, bronze medalist(s)	2nd place, silver medalist(s)	3rd place, bronze medalist(s)

Year	Competition Description	Location	Apparatus	Rank-Final	Score-Final	Rank-Qualifying	Score-Qualifying
2014	World Championships	Nanning	Team			30	196.328
2014	World Championships	Nanning	All-Around			70	51.098
2014	World Championships	Nanning	Vault			27	12.699
2014	World Championships	Nanning	Uneven Bars			82	12.933
2014	World Championships	Nanning	Balance Beam			123	12.166
2014	World Championships	Nanning	Floor Exercise			48	13.166
2014	European Championships	Sofia	Team			16	147.729
2014	European Championships	Sofia	Vault	2	14.583	2	14.516
2014	European Championships	Sofia	Uneven Bars			41	12.800
2014	European Championships	Sofia	Balance Beam			39	12.566
2014	European Championships	Sofia	Floor Exercise			40	12.733

- Competitor for Russia

Year	Competition Description	Location	Apparatus	Rank-Final	Score-Final	Rank-Qualifying	Score-Qualifying
2008	Olympic Games	Beijing	Team	4	180.625	3	244.400
2008	Olympic Games	Beijing	All-Around	7	60.825	5	60.900
2008	Olympic Games	Beijing	Vault	8	7.812	5	15.275
2008	Olympic Games	Beijing	Uneven Bars			35	14.600
2008	Olympic Games	Beijing	Balance Beam	4	15.900	6	15.825
2008	Olympic Games	Beijing	Floor Exercise	8	14.125	7	15.125
2008	European Championships	Clermont-Ferrand	Team	2	179.475	2	176.425
2008	European Championships	Clermont-Ferrand	Vault	5	14.337	3	14.712
2008	European Championships	Clermont-Ferrand	Balance Beam			13	14.750
2008	European Championships	Clermont-Ferrand	Floor Exercise	5	14.875	7	14.875
2006	World Cup Final	São Paulo	Vault	4	14.725		
2006	World Cup Final	São Paulo	Balance Beam	4	15.150		
2006	World Championships	Aarhus	Team	3	177.325	4	234.800
2006	World Championships	Aarhus	All-Around	19	57.625	15	58.425
2006	World Championships	Aarhus	Vault	5	14.975	7	14.700
2006	World Championships	Aarhus	Uneven Bars			36	14.350
2006	World Championships	Aarhus	Balance Beam	4	15.275	5	15.525
2006	World Championships	Aarhus	Floor Exercise			69	13.700
2005	World Championships	Melbourne	All-Around	7	36.387	8	36.174
2005	World Championships	Melbourne	Vault	5	9.237	5	9.312
2005	World Championships	Melbourne	Uneven Bars			47	8.362
2005	World Championships	Melbourne	Balance Beam	6	8.762	4	9.350
2005	World Championships	Melbourne	Floor Exercise			14	9.125
2005	European Championships	Debrecen	All-Around	2	37.074	8	35.586
2005	European Championships	Debrecen	Vault	2	9.312	1	9.356
2005	European Championships	Debrecen	Uneven Bars			38	8.312
2005	European Championships	Debrecen	Balance Beam	3	9.325	2	9.287
2005	European Championships	Debrecen	Floor Exercise			14	8.600
2004	World Cup Final	Birmingham	Vault	3	9.418		
2004	World Cup Final	Birmingham	Balance Beam	8	8.850		
2004	Olympic Games	Athens	Team	3	113.235	4	149.420
2004	Olympic Games	Athens	All-Around	4	38.024	7	37.711
2004	Olympic Games	Athens	Vault	3	9.475	5	9.437
2004	Olympic Games	Athens	Uneven Bars			46	9.237
2004	Olympic Games	Athens	Balance Beam	4	9.587	4	9.637
2004	Olympic Games	Athens	Floor Exercise			19	9.400
2004	European Championships	Amsterdam	Team	3	110.423		
2004	European Championships	Amsterdam	All-Around			11	35.875
2004	European Championships	Amsterdam	Vault	2	9.381	3	9.450
2004	European Championships	Amsterdam	Uneven Bars			50	8.225
2004	European Championships	Amsterdam	Balance Beam			12	8.950
2004	European Championships	Amsterdam	Floor Exercise			9	9.200
2003	World Championships	Anaheim	Team	6	108.985	5	145.572
2003	World Championships	Anaheim	All-Around	10	36.736	6	36.812
2003	World Championships	Anaheim	Vault	5	9.356	3	9.431
2003	World Championships	Anaheim	Uneven Bars			76	8.712
2003	World Championships	Anaheim	Balance Beam			13	9.325
2003	World Championships	Anaheim	Floor Exercise	7	9.237	8	9.350

== See also ==
- List of Olympic female gymnasts for Russia
- Nationality changes in gymnastics
