= Soraya Chaouch =

French artistic gymnast

- Born: 23 August 1988 (age 38)

Gymnastics career
- Discipline: Women's artistic gymnastics
- Country represented: France; (2004)

Soraya Chaouch (born 23 August 1988) was a French female artistic gymnast, representing her nation at international competitions.

She participated at the 2004 Summer Olympics, and the 2003 World Artistic Gymnastics Championships.
