= Mirabella Akhunu =

Ukrainian artistic gymnast (born 1987)

- Full name: Mirabella Viliamivna Akhunu
- Born: 7 June 1987 (age 39) Kiev, Ukrainian SSR, Soviet Union
- Height: 1.59 m (5 ft 3 in)

Gymnastics career
- Discipline: Women's artistic gymnastics
- Country represented: Ukraine

Mirabella Viliamivna Akhunu (born 7 June 1987) is a Ukrainian artistic gymnast. She competed in the 2004 Summer Olympics.

== See also ==
- List of Olympic female artistic gymnasts for Ukraine
