= Oana Petrovschi =

Romanian artistic gymnast

Oana Petrovschi (Oana Petrovski)
- Full name: Oana Andreea Petrovschi
- Born: 5 February 1986 (age 40) Bârlad, Romania

Gymnastics career
- Discipline: Women's artistic gymnastics
- Country represented: Romania
Medal record
World Championships
| Silver medal – second place | 2002 Debrecen | Uneven bars |
European Championships
| Bronze medal – third place | 2002 Patras | Vault |

Oana Andreea Petrovschi (born 5 February 1986 in Bârlad, Romania) is a retired Romanian artistic gymnast. She is a silver world medalist on uneven bars and a bronze European medalist on vault.

== Professional career ==
In 2002, she was elected Sportsman of the year in Hunedoara County.
