= Alona Kvasha =

Ukrainian artistic gymnast (born 1984)

- Full name: Alona Serhiivna Kvasha
- Born: November 5, 1984 (age 41) Cherkasy, Ukrainian SSR, Soviet Union
- Height: 146 cm (4 ft 9 in)

Gymnastics career
- Discipline: Women's artistic gymnastics
- Country represented: Ukraine
Medal record
Artistic Gymnastics
Representing Ukraine
European Championships
| Gold medal – first place | 2002 Patras | Floor Exercise |
| Silver medal – second place | 2000 Paris | Team |
| Silver medal – second place | 2004 Amsterdam | Team |
| Bronze medal – third place | 2002 Patras | All-Around |
European Team Championships
| Silver medal – second place | 2001 Riesa | Team |
| Silver medal – second place | 2003 Moscow | Team |
Summer Universiade
| Silver medal – second place | 2003 Daegu | Team |
Goodwill Games
| Bronze medal – third place | 2001 Brisbane | Vault |

Alona Serhiivna Kvasha (Ukrainian: Альона Сергіївна Кваша; born November 5, 1984) is a Ukrainian former artistic gymnast. She competed at the 2000 and 2004 Summer Olympics.

At the 2000 Sydney Olympic Games, Kvasha competed only on vault for the Ukrainian team, scoring 9.581 which was tied for the 8th highest qualifying score. However, due to the tie-breaking procedures, she did not qualify to event finals. The Ukrainian team eventually finished 5th in the team final after the Chinese team was later disqualified for falsifying the age of Dong Fangxiao.

Internationally, 2002 Euros was Kvasha's most successful competition. After finishing 4th in team finals, she went on to claim the bronze medal in the all-around finals with a total score of 36.405. In the event finals, she became the European floor champion after performing a clean exercise for a score of 9.500. In vault finals, she finished 4th with a score of 9.043.

After beating Russia to the team silver medal at the 2004 European Championships, Ukraine looked a consistent team going into the Olympics. In Athens, Ukraine placed 5th in team qualifications, where Kvasha contributed scores of 9.412 (vault), 8.850 (bars), 8.987 (beam) and 9.462 (floor). The team later placed 4th during finals. In the event finals, Kvasha finished 6th on the vault with a score of 9.343.

== See also ==
- List of Olympic female artistic gymnasts for Ukraine
