= Irina Yarotska =

Ukrainian artistic gymnast (born 1985)

- Born: August 29, 1985 (age 41) Kyiv, Ukrainian SSR, Soviet Union
- Height: 162 cm (5 ft 4 in)

Gymnastics career
- Discipline: Women's artistic gymnastics
- Country represented: Ukraine
- Eponymous skills: Uneven Bars
- Retired: 2004
Medal record
Women's artistic gymnastics
Representing Ukraine
World Championships
Bronze medal – third place	2002 Debrecen	Balance Beam
European Championships
Silver medal – second place	2004 Amsterdam	Team
European Team Championships
Silver medal – second place	2003 Moscow	Team
Summer Universiade
Gold medal – first place	2003 Daegu	All-Around
Gold medal – first place	2003 Daegu	Balance Beam
Gold medal – first place	2003 Daegu	Floor Exercise
Silver medal – second place	2003 Daegu	Team
Bronze medal – third place	2003 Daegu	Uneven Bars

Irina Yarotska (also spelled Iryna, born August 29, 1985) is a Ukrainian female artistic gymnast. Yarotska was born in Kyiv, Ukraine and is coached by Ghalina Chieghimagha.

== Career ==
She started gymnastics at age 6 and began her career as a senior elite gymnast at 16, in 2001. Irina Vladimirovna Yarotskaya (her full name in her native Ukrainian) won the bronze medal on the balance beam at the 2002 World Championships in Debrecen. She also placed fourth in the all-around at the 2003 World Championships in Anaheim, California and went on to win the gold for all around and silver with her team at the 2003 University Games. The following year, she was a member of the 2004 Ukrainian Olympic team, where she finished fourth with her team and sixth in the all-around. Following her retirement in 2005, she married Valeri Goncharov, a fellow Ukrainian Olympian and gold medalist on the parallel bars. She was known for her elegant lines and nice execution, as are many of the Ukrainian gymnasts.

== Eponymous skill ==
Yarotska has one eponymous skill listed in the Code of Points.

Apparatus	Name	Description	Difficulty (Note: Valid for the 2025-2028 Code of Points)
Uneven bars	Yarotska	Clear hip circle backward on low bar with hecht to hang on high bar	C

== See also ==
- List of Olympic female artistic gymnasts for Ukraine
