= Elena Gómez =

Spanish gymnast (born 1985)

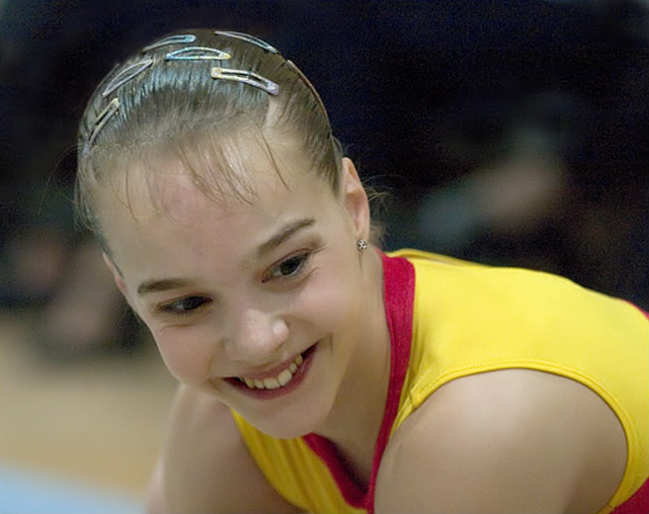
- Gómez in 2004

Personal information
- Full name: Elena Gómez Servera
- Born: November 14, 1985 (age 40) Manacor, Mallorca, Spain
- Height: 150 cm (4 ft 11 in)

Gymnastics career
- Discipline: Women's artistic gymnastics
- Country represented: Spain
- Club: Olympic COR
- Head coach: Jesus Carballo
- Assistant coach: Eva Lucia Almudena
- Choreographer: Fuensanta Ross
- Eponymous skills: Gomez (floor exercise)
- Retired: 2006
Medal record
World Championships
Gold medal – first place	2002 Debrecen	Floor Exercise
Bronze medal – third place	2003 Anaheim	Floor Exercise
European Championships
Silver medal – second place	2004 Amsterdam	Floor Exercise
Mediterranean Games
Gold medal – first place	2001 Tunis	Team
Gold medal – first place	2001 Tunis	Floor exercise
Bronze medal – third place	2001 Tunis	All-around

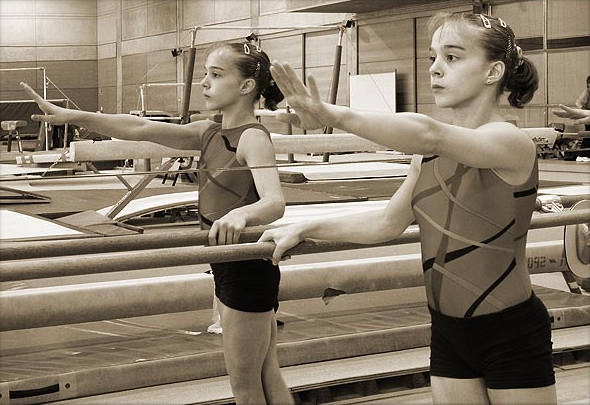
Gómez in 2003

Elena Gómez Servera (born November 14, 1985) is a Spanish former artistic gymnast. Her best event was floor exercise. She is one of the best gymnasts that Spain has had in the history of this sport, being the only one to get a gold medal in a world championship.

== Career ==
=== Junior career ===
At the 2000 Junior European Championships, Gomez placed 6th in both the team final and the individual all-around final.

=== Senior career ===
Gomez made her senior debut in 2001. At the 2001 World Championships in Ghent, Belgium, Gomez and the Spanish team placed 4th in the team final. Individually, Gomez placed 17th in the all-around final and 6th in the balance beam final.

Gomez attended the 2002 European Championships. Here she placed 7th in the all-around, 6th on vault, 8th on balance beam and 4th on floor exercise. Later that year at the 2002 World Championships in Debrecen, Hungary Gomez won the floor exercise final. Gomez was the first-ever Spanish female gymnast to win a World title in Women's Artistic Gymnastics.

The following year, Gomez attended the 2003 World Championships in Anaheim, California. Here, the Spanish team placed 5th, therefore qualifying a full team to the 2004 Summer Olympics. She won bronze the medal in floor exercise the following year in Anaheim using the same routine with the score of 9.675. Additionally, Gomez placed 5th in both the all-around final and the balance beam final.

In 2004 Gomez competed at the 2004 European Championships. Here, the Spanish team placed 4th. Individually, Gomez placed 5th in the all-around, and won a silver medal on the floor exercise. Gomez was named to the Spanish team for the 2004 Summer Olympics where she placed 8th in the all-around. The Spanish team placed fifth.

== Post-retirement and personal life ==
Gómez announced that she was retiring from the sport in 2006, following injuries sustained in training. She has three sisters, notably the younger: Natalia, also known as guitarist of the rock band Puja Fasua.

== Eponymous skill ==
Gómez has the quadruple pirouette named after her in the Code of Points.

Apparatus	Name	Description	Difficulty (Note: Valid for the 2025–2028 Code of Points)	Added to Code of Points
Floor exercise	Gomez	4/1 turn (1440°) on one leg - free leg optional below horizontal	E (0.5)	2002 World Championships

== Floor music ==
2001-2002: "Mozart L'Egyptien: Mawwall" by Milen Natchev & the Bulgarian Symphonic Orchestra

2002-2004: "Jump Up Boogie" by Charlie Normal and Robert Wells

2004: "Respirando" by Ana Belen
