= European Team Gymnastics Championships =

The European Team Gymnastics Championships, initially held as the European Gymnastics Masters, was a competition organized by the European Union of Gymnastics combining men's and women's artistic gymnastics and rhythmic gymnastics events.

== History ==
The competition was first held in 1997 under the name European Gymnastics Masters in Paris, France. A second edition of the tournament, still as European Gymnastics Masters, was held in 1999 in Patras, Greece. In 2001 the competition was renamed to European Team Gymnastics Championships. It was last held in 2003. All four editions of the tournament were organized by the European Union of Gymnastics.

== Editions ==
Year	Edition	Competition	Host city	Country
1997	I	1st European Gymnastics Masters	Paris	France
1999	II	2nd European Gymnastics Masters	Patras	Greece
2001	I	1st European Team Gymnastics Championships	Riesa	Germany
2003	II	2nd European Team Gymnastics Championships	Moscow	Russia

== Medals by country ==
1997–2003

Rank	Nation	Gold	Silver	Bronze	Total
1	Russia	3	0	0	3
2	Belarus	1	0	1	2
3	Ukraine	0	3	1	4
4	Bulgaria	0	1	0	1
5	Greece	0	0	1	1
5	Spain	0	0	1	1
Totals (6 entries)		4	4	4	12

== See also ==
- European Gymnastics Championships
- European Men's Artistic Gymnastics Championships
- European Women's Artistic Gymnastics Championships
- Rhythmic Gymnastics European Championships
