= Ukraine at the 2003 Summer Universiade =

- IOC code: UKR

in Daegu 21 — 31 August 2003
- Competitors: 170 in 12 sports
- Medals Ranked 4th: Gold 23 Silver 15 Bronze 17 Total 55

Summer Universiade appearances (overview)
- 1993; 1995; 1997; 1999; 2001; 2003; 2005; 2007; 2009; 2011; 2013; 2015; 2017; 2019; 2021; 2025; 2027

Ukraine competed at the 2003 Summer Universiade in Daegu, South Korea, from 21 to 31 August 2003. Ukrainian athletes did not compete in tennis and water polo. Ukraine's male football team finished 11th.

== Medal summary ==
=== Medal by sports ===
Medals by sport
Sport	1st place, gold medalist(s)	2nd place, silver medalist(s)	3rd place, bronze medalist(s)	Total
Swimming	9	6	5	20
Athletics	7	1	1	9
Artistic gymnastics	4	3	5	12
Fencing	2	1	0	3
Rhythmic gymnastics	1	4	0	5
Taekwondo	0	1	1	2
Archery	0	0	2	2
Judo	0	0	2	2
Total	23	15	17	55

=== Medalists ===
Medal	Name	Sport	Event
Gold	Andriy Mykhaylychenko	Artistic gymnastics	Men's horizontal bar
Gold	Irina Yarotska	Artistic gymnastics	Women's individual all-around
Gold	Irina Yarotska	Artistic gymnastics	Men's balance beam
Gold	Irina Yarotska	Artistic gymnastics	Men's floor exercises
Gold	Andriy Tverdostup	Athletics	Men's 400 metres
Gold	Serhiy Lebid	Athletics	Men's 5000 metres
Gold	Volodymyr Demchenko; Yevgeniy Zyukov; Hennadiy Horbenko; Andriy Tverdostup	Athletics	Men's 4 × 400 metres relay
Gold	Oleksandr Korchmid	Athletics	Men's pole vault
Gold	Valeriy Vasylyev	Athletics	Men's long jump
Gold	Nataliya Tobias	Athletics	Women's 1500 metres
Gold	Natalya Fokina	Athletics	Women's discus throw
Gold	Volodymyr Lukashenko	Fencing	Men's individual sabre
Gold	Dmytro Karyuchenko; Maksym Khvorost; Vitaliy Osharov; Bohdan Nikishyn	Fencing	Men's team épée
Gold	Anna Bessonova	Rhythmic gymnastics	Women's individual ribbon
Gold	Vyacheslav Shyrshov	Swimming	Men's 50 m freestyle
Gold	Andriy Serdinov	Swimming	Men's 50 m butterfly
Gold	Andriy Serdinov	Swimming	Men's 100 m butterfly
Gold	Volodymyr Nikolaychuk; Oleh Lisohor; Andriy Serdinov; Yuriy Yehoshyn	Swimming	Men's 4 × 100 m medley relay
Gold	Olga Mukomol	Swimming	Women's 50 m freestyle
Gold	Yana Klochkova	Swimming	Women's 200 m freestyle
Gold	Yana Klochkova	Swimming	Women's 200 m butterfly
Gold	Yana Klochkova	Swimming	Women's 200 m individual medley
Gold	Yana Klochkova	Swimming	Women's 400 m individual medley
Silver	Andriy Mykhaylychenko; Ruslan Mezentsev; Roman Zozulya; Serhiy Vyaltsev; Valeriy Honcharov	Artistic gymnastics	Men's team all-around
Silver	Marina Proskurina; Natalia Sirobaba; Alona Kvasha; Irina Yarotska	Artistic gymnastics	Women's team all-around
Silver	Marina Proskurina	Artistic gymnastics	Women's vault
Silver	Viktor Yastrebov	Athletics	Men's triple jump
Silver	Volodymyr Lukashenko; Vladyslav Tretiak; Oleh Shturbabin; Serhiy Shkalikov	Fencing	Men's team sabre
Silver	Anna Bessonova	Rhythmic gymnastics	Women's individual all-around
Silver	Anna Bessonova	Rhythmic gymnastics	Women's individual ball
Silver	Anna Bessonova	Rhythmic gymnastics	Women's individual clubs
Silver	Anna Bessonova	Rhythmic gymnastics	Women's individual hoop
Silver	Ihor Chervynskyy	Swimming	Men's 800 m freestyle
Silver	Ihor Chervynskyy	Swimming	Men's 1500 m freestyle
Silver	Oleh Lisohor	Swimming	Men's 50 m breaststroke
Silver	Serhiy Breus	Swimming	Men's 50 m butterfly
Silver	Serhiy Advena	Swimming	Men's 200 m butterfly
Silver	Vyacheslav Shyrshov; Denys Syzonenko; Andriy Serdinov; Yuriy Yehoshyn	Swimming	Men's 4 × 100 m freestyle relay
Silver	Petro Davydov	Taekwondo	Men's 72 kg
Bronze	Valeriy Honcharov	Artistic gymnastics	Men's horizontal bar
Bronze	Roman Zozulya	Artistic gymnastics	Men's rings
Bronze	Natalia Sirobaba	Artistic gymnastics	Women's individual all-around
Bronze	Irina Yarotska	Artistic gymnastics	Women's uneven bars
Bronze	Natalia Sirobaba	Artistic gymnastics	Women's floor exercises
Bronze	Anastasiya Rabchenyuk	Athletics	Women's 400 metres hurdles
Bronze	Oleksandr Serdyuk	Archery	Men's individual recurve
Bronze	Kateryna Palekha; Tetyana Berezhna; Tetyana Dorokhova	Archery	Women's team recurve
Bronze	Stanislav Knysh; Valentyn Iefimov; Viktor Savinov; Roman Hontyuk; Andriy Bloshenko; Vitaliy Bubon	Judo	Men's team
Bronze	Mariya Semenyuk	Judo	Women's openweight
Bronze	Yuriy Yehoshyn	Swimming	Men's 100 m freestyle
Bronze	Vyacheslav Shyrshov	Swimming	Men's 50 m backstroke
Bronze	Volodymyr Nikolaychuk	Swimming	Men's 100 m backstroke
Bronze	OLeh Lisohor	Swimming	Men's 100 m breaststroke
Bronze	Olha Beresnyeva	Swimming	Women's 800 m freestyle
Bronze	Olha Cherkun	Taekwondo	Women's 63 kg

== See also ==
- Ukraine at the 2003 Winter Universiade
