= Ukraine at the 2001 Summer Universiade =

- IOC code: UKR

in Beijing, China 22 August - 1 September 2001
- Competitors: 213
- Medals Ranked 4th: Gold 13 Silver 14 Bronze 7 Total 34

Summer Universiade appearances (overview)
- 1993; 1995; 1997; 1999; 2001; 2003; 2005; 2007; 2009; 2011; 2013; 2015; 2017; 2019; 2021

Ukraine competed at the 2001 Summer Universiade in Beijing, China, from 22 August to 1 September 2001. Ukrainian men's basketball team finished 13th, Ukrainian men's volleyball team finished 13th, Ukrainian women's volleyball team ranked 9th. Ukraine did not compete in water polo (and no information regarding tennis and table tennis).

== Medal summary ==
=== Medal by sports ===
Medals by sport
Sport	1st place, gold medalist(s)	2nd place, silver medalist(s)	3rd place, bronze medalist(s)	Total
Swimming	7	4	2	13
Rhythmic gymnastics	4	1	0	5
Athletics	2	4	1	7
Diving	0	2	1	3
Fencing	0	2	1	3
Football	0	1	0	1
Judo	0	0	2	2
Total	13	14	7	34

=== Medalists ===
Medal	Name	Sport	Event
Gold	Serhiy Lebid	Athletics	Men's 5000 metres
Gold	Vita Palamar	Athletics	Women's high jump
Gold	Tamara Yerofeeva	Rhythmic gymnastics	Individual all-around
Gold	Tamara Yerofeeva	Rhythmic gymnastics	Ball
Gold	Tamara Yerofeeva	Rhythmic gymnastics	Rope
Gold	Tamara Yerofeeva	Rhythmic gymnastics	Hoop
Gold	Ihor Snitko	Swimming	Men's freestyle 400 metres
Gold	Ihor Snitko	Swimming	Men's freestyle 800 metres
Gold	Ihor Snitko	Swimming	Men's freestyle 1500 metres
Gold	Oleh Lisohor	Swimming	Men's breaststroke 50 metres
Gold	Oleh Lisohor	Swimming	Men's breaststroke 100 metres
Gold	Yana Klochkova	Swimming	Women's freestyle 800 metres
Gold	Yana Klochkova	Swimming	Women's individual medley 200 metres
Silver	Andriy Tverdostup; Yevhen Zyukov; Oleksandr Kaydash; Volodymyr Rybalka	Athletics	Men's 4 × 400 metres relay
Silver	Yuriy Bilonoh	Athletics	Men's shot put
Silver	Vladyslav Piskunov	Athletics	Men's hammer throw
Silver	Volodymyr Mykhailenko	Athletics	Men's decathlon
Silver	Hanna Sorokina; Olena Zhupina	Diving	Women's synchronized 3 metre springboard
Silver	Hanna Sorokina; Olena Zhupina; Olha Leonova	Diving	Women's team trophy
Silver	Maksym Khvorost	Fencing	Men's individual épée
Silver	Anna Harina	Fencing	Women's individual épée
Silver	Dmytro Kozachenko; Vadym Zhukov; Vasyl Hrechanyi; Yevhen Bredun; Oleh Shkred; Dmytro Kondratovych; Andriy Yerokhin; Vitaliy Bielikov; Serhiy Klyuchyk; Oleksandr Batrachenko; Ivan Oleksiyenko; Volodymyr Brayila; Dmytro Bermudes; Oleksandr Antonenko; Ivan Kozoriz; Oleksiy Telyatnykov; Myroslav Bundash; Yaroslav Skydan	Football	Men's team
Silver	Tamara Yerofeeva	Rhythmic gymnastics	Clubs
Silver	Vyacheslav Shyrshov	Swimming	Men's freestyle 50 metres
Silver	Andriy Serdinov	Swimming	Men's butterfly 100 metres
Silver	Andriy Serdinov; Vyacheslav Shyrshov; Volodymyr Nikolaychuk; Oleh Lisohor	Swimming	Men's 4 × 100 m medley relay
Silver	Olha Mukomol	Swimming	Women's freestyle 50 metres
Bronze	Andriy Tverdostup	Athletics	Men's 400 metres
Bronze	Roman Volodkov	Diving	Men's 10 metre platform
Bronze	Anna Harina; Natalia Hruzynska; Olha Partala; Yeva Vybornova	Fencing	Women's team épée
Bronze	Dmytro Selezen	Judo	Men's heavyweight (+100 kg)
Bronze	Maryna Prokofyeva	Judo	Women's heavyweight (+78 kg)
Bronze	Vyacheslav Shyrshov	Swimming	Men's freestyle 100 metres
Bronze	Volodymyr Nikolaychuk	Swimming	Men's backstroke 100 metres

== See also ==
- Ukraine at the 2001 Winter Universiade
