= Ukraine at the 1999 Summer Universiade =

- IOC code: UKR

in Palma de Mallorca, Spain 3 - 13 July 1999
- Competitors: 143 in 11 sports
- Medals Ranked 8th: Gold 7 Silver 7 Bronze 9 Total 23

Summer Universiade appearances (overview)
- 1993; 1995; 1997; 1999; 2001; 2003; 2005; 2007; 2009; 2011; 2013; 2015; 2017; 2019; 2021; 2025; 2027

Ukraine competed at the 1999 Summer Universiade in Palma de Mallorca, Spain, from 3 to 13 July 1999. Ukraine women's basketball team finished 4th, men's football team finished 11th, and women's volleyball team finished 13th. Ukraine did not compete in water polo.

== Medal summary ==
=== Medal by sports ===
Medals by sport
Sport	1st place, gold medalist(s)	2nd place, silver medalist(s)	3rd place, bronze medalist(s)	Total
Athletics	4	0	2	6
Fencing	2	2	0	4
Artistic gymnastics	1	2	2	5
Swimming	0	1	3	4
Judo	0	1	2	3
Sailing	0	1	0	1
Total	7	7	9	23

=== Medalists ===
Medal	Name	Sport	Event
Gold	Serhiy Lebid	Athletics	Men's 5000 metres
Gold	Oleksy Lukashevych	Athletics	Men's long jump
Gold	Olena Shekhovtsova	Athletics	Women's long jump
Gold	Olena Hovorova	Athletics	Women's triple jump
Gold	Vadym Gutzeit	Fencing	Men's individual sabre
Gold	Natalia Hruzynska; Hanna Harina; Yeva Vybornova; Viktoria Tytova	Fencing	Women's team épée
Gold	Oleksandr Beresch	Gymnastics	Men's individual all-around
Silver	Oleksandr Horbachuk	Fencing	Men's individual épée
Silver	Natalia Hruzynska	Fencing	Women's individual épée
Silver	Olha Teslenko; Viktoria Karpenko; Halyna Tyryk; Inha Shkarupa	Gymnastics	Women's team all-around
Silver	Olha Teslenko	Gymnastics	Women's uneven bars
Silver	Ihor Horbokon	Judo	Men's half-heavyweight (100 kg)
Silver	Maksym Oberemko	Judo	Men's windsurf
Silver	Anton Berdnykov; Vladyslav Haydamaka; Artem Honcharenko; Rostyslav Svanidze	Swimming	Men's 4 × 200 m freestyle relay
Bronze	Vladyslav Piskunov	Athletics	Men's hammer throw
Bronze	Valentyna Savchuk	Athletics	Women's 10 kilometres walk
Bronze	Viktoria Karpenko	Gymnastics	Women's uneven bars
Bronze	Halyna Tyryk	Gymnastics	Women's floor
Bronze	Ruslan Revenko	Judo	Men's half-middleweight (81 kg)
Bronze	Ihor Horbokon; Ruslan Revenko; Andriy Donchenko; Valentyn Ruslyakov; Ruslan Mashurenko; Hennadiy Bilodid	Judo	Men's half-heavyweight (100 kg)
Bronze	Denys Zavhorodnyy	Swimming	Men's 400 m freestyle
Bronze	Denys Zavhorodnyy	Swimming	Men's 800 m freestyle
Bronze	Natalia Zolotukhina; Valentyna Trehub; Iraida Shchehlova; Olena Kutepova	Swimming	Women's 4 × 100 m medley relay

== See also ==
- Ukraine at the 1999 Winter Universiade
