= Chris Cozens =

British swimmer (born 1982)

Medal record

Men's swimming

Representing Great Britain

European Championships - Short Course
Bronze medal – third place	2005 Trieste	4×50 m freestyle

Summer Universiade
Gold medal – first place	2001 Beijing	4×100 m freestyle
Gold medal – first place	2003 Daegu	4×100 m freestyle
Silver medal – second place	2003 Daegu	100 m freestyle
Silver medal – second place	2005 Izmir	4×100 m freestyle

Chris Cozens (born 14 June 1982, in Bristol) is a freestyle swimmer from Great Britain.

== Swimming career ==
He was a silver medallist in the 100 m freestyle (47.51) at the 2003 Summer Universiade in Daegu, South Korea. He studied at Loughborough University, and won the bronze medal in the 4×50 m freestyle relay at the 2005 European Short Course Championships in Trieste, Italy. Became the first British man under 48 seconds in the 100m Freestyle at the British Short Course Championships in Stockport 2003.

He is a two times winner of the British Championship in 100 metres freestyle (2003 and 2005).
