= Jani Tanskanen =

Finnish artistic gymnast

- Born: 28 November 1975 (age 50) Jyväskylä, Finland

Gymnastics career
- Discipline: Men's artistic gymnastics
- Country represented: Finland
- Retired: 2008
Medal record
Men's artistic gymnastics
Representing Finland
World Championships
Gold medal – first place	1997 Lausanne	Horizontal bar
World University Games
Silver medal – second place	2003 Daegu	Horizontal bar

Jani Tanskanen (born 28 November 1975) is a Finnish former artistic gymnast. He is the 1997 World Champion on horizontal bar, and the first Finnish gold medalist at the World Championships since 1950. He competed internationally for over two decades but never competed at the Olympic Games. After finishing his gymnastics career, he served in multiple positions at the International Gymnastics Federation.

== Gymnastics career ==
Tanskanen began gymnastics when he was six years old and became a member of the Finnish junior national team five years later. He began competing at the senior level in 1991. He competed at the 1994 World Championships but did not advance into any finals.

At the 1997 World Championships, he won the gold medal on the horizontal bar with a score of 9.700, marking Finland's first gold medal at the World Championships since 1950. At the 1998 European Championships, he finished ninth in the all-around and seventh in the horizontal bar final. Then at the 1998 Goodwill Games, he finished eighth in the horizontal bar final.

Tanskanen finished 19th in the all-around at the 2000 European Championships. He qualified for the horizontal bar final at the 2001 World Championships but withdrew, citing an injury. He later claimed that he was not actually injured, but he withdrew because he felt the score he received in the qualifications was undeserved, and he wanted to give teammate Jari Monkkonen the chance to compete in a final. He won the horizontal bar silver medal, behind Andriy Mykhailychenko, at the 2003 Summer Universiade.

Tanskanen retired from gymnastics in 2008 after failing to qualify for the 2008 Summer Olympics.

== Post-gymnastics career ==
Tanskanen began working for the Finnish Gymnastics Federation immediately after his retirement. In 2009, he was elected to the International Gymnastics Federation (FIG) Athletes’ Commission as the men's artistic gymnastics representative. He served two terms as president of the Commission, which also made him a voting member of the FIG Council and Executive Committee. He stepped down from the presidency in 2017 after being elected to the Executive Committee and was replaced by Liubov Charkashyna. He served as an "athlete role model" at the 2010 and 2014 Summer Youth Olympics.
