= Gymnastics at the 1999 Summer Universiade =

Gymnastics competition

Gymnastics at the XX Summer Universiade
- Venue: Palma Arena

The gymnastics competition in the 1999 Summer Universiade were held in Palma de Mallorca, Spain.

== Medal table ==
Rank	Nation	Gold	Silver	Bronze	Total
1	Russia (RUS)	8	5	1	14
2	Belarus (BLR)	2	2	0	4
3	Ukraine (UKR)	1	2	2	5
4	Cuba (CUB)	1	1	1	3
5	Japan (JPN)	1	0	1	2
6	Romania (ROU)	1	0	0	1
7	China (CHN)	0	2	4	6
8	South Korea (KOR)	0	2	1	3
9	France (FRA)	0	1	0	1
10	Croatia (CRO)	0	0	1	1
10	Italy (ITA)	0	0	1	1
10	Spain (ESP)	0	0	1	1
Totals (12 entries)		14	15	13	42

== Artistic gymnastics ==
=== Men's events ===
Event	Gold	Silver	Bronze
Individual all-around	Oleksandr Beresch; Ukraine	Nikolai Kryukov; Russia	Erick López; Cuba
Team all-around	Japan (JPN); Akihiro Kasamatsu; Naoya Tsukahara; Yoshihiro Saito; Tatsuya Yamada	Russia (RUS); Nikolai Kryukov; Alexei Bondarenko; Yevgeni Podgorny; Alexei Nemov	China (CHN); Dong Zhen; Lu Jia; Zheng Lihui; Zhao Zhe
Rings	Ivan Ivankov; Belarus	Dong Zhen; China	Jesús Carballo; Spain
Bar	Nikolai Kryukov; Russia	Lee Joo-hyung; South Korea	Alberto Busnari; Italy
Parallel bar	Nikolai Kryukov; Russia	Jung Jin-soo; South Korea	Naoya Tsukahara; Japan
Vault	Abel Driggs; Cuba	Nikolai Kryukov; Russia	Cho Seong-min; South Korea
Floor	Vitaly Rudnitsky; Belarus	Alexei Bondarenko; Russia	Akihiro Kasamatsu; Japan
Pommel horse	Marius Urzică; Romania	Lu Jia; China; Éric Poujade; France	

=== Women's events ===
Event	Gold	Silver	Bronze
Individual all-around	Svetlana Khorkina; Russia	Yelena Produnova; Russia	Liu Xuan; China
Team all-around	Russia (RUS); Svetlana Khorkina; Yelena Produnova; Elena Dolgopolova; Yulia Korosteleva	Ukraine (UKR); Olha Teslenko; Viktoria Karpenko; Halyna Tyryk; Inha Shkarupa	China (CHN); Bi Wenjing; Liu Xuan
Uneven bars	Svetlana Khorkina; Russia	Olha Teslenko; Ukraine	Viktoria Karpenko; Ukraine
Vault	Yelena Produnova; Russia	Arasay Jova; Cuba	Elena Dolgopolova; Russia
Floor	Svetlana Khorkina; Russia	Yelena Palazkova; Belarus	Halyna Tyryk; Ukraine
Balance beam	Yelena Produnova; Russia	Inna Poklonskaya; Belarus	Bi Wenjing; China

== External sources ==
- Gymnastics results of the 1995 Summer Universiade
- Results on sports123.com
