= Ukraine at the 1995 Summer Universiade =

- IOC code: UKR

in Fukuoka, Japan 23 August - 3 September 1995
- Competitors: 130
- Officials: 50
- Medals Ranked 9th: Gold 4 Silver 5 Bronze 6 Total 15

Summer Universiade appearances (overview)
- 1993; 1995; 1997; 1999; 2001; 2003; 2005; 2007; 2009; 2011; 2013; 2015; 2017; 2019; 2021

Ukraine competed at the 1995 Summer Universiade in Fukuoka, Japan, from 23 August to 3 September 1995. Ukraine did not compete in baseball and water polo. Ukrainian women's basketball team finished 11th, men's football team ranked 4th, and men's volleyball team placed 11th.

== Medal summary ==
=== Medal by sports ===
Medals by sport
| Sport | 1st place, gold medalist(s) | 2nd place, silver medalist(s) | 3rd place, bronze medalist(s) | Total |
|---|---|---|---|---|
| Athletics | 3 | 3 | 3 | 9 |
| Artistic gymnastics | 1 | 0 | 2 | 3 |
| Fencing | 0 | 2 | 0 | 2 |
| Judo | 0 | 0 | 1 | 1 |
| Total | 4 | 5 | 6 | 15 |

=== Medalists ===
| Medal | Name | Sport | Event |
|---|---|---|---|
| Gold | Yuriy Bilonoh | Athletics | Men's shot put |
| Gold | Vitaliy Sydorov | Athletics | Men's discus throw |
| Gold | Viktoriya Vershynina | Athletics | Women's long jump |
| Gold | Olha Shulha | Gymnastics | Women's individual all-around |
| Silver | Oleksandr Krykun | Athletics | Men's hammer throw |
| Silver | Svitlana Tverdokhlib | Athletics | Women's 800 metres |
| Silver | Olena Ovcharova | Athletics | Women's 100 metres hurdles |
| Silver | Vadym Gutzeit | Fencing | Men's individual sabre |
| Silver | Andriy Maliy; Andriy Semenihin; Oleksandr Kocherhin; Serhiy Holubytskyi | Fencing | Men's team épée |
| Bronze | Andriy Uhlov | Athletics | Men's javelin throw |
| Bronze | Olena Rurak | Athletics | Women's 400 metres |
| Bronze | Viktoriya Fomenko; Svitlana Tverdokhlib; Tatyana Movchan; Olena Rurak | Athletics | Women's 4 × 400 metres relay |
| Bronze | Olha Shulha | Gymnastics | Women's floor exercises |
| Bronze | Natalia Kalinina | Gymnastics | Women's floor exercises |
| Bronze | Koba Nadiradze | Judo | Men's half-heavyweight (95 kg) |

== See also ==
- Ukraine at the 1995 Winter Universiade
