= Hicham Bellani =

Moroccan runner (born 1979)

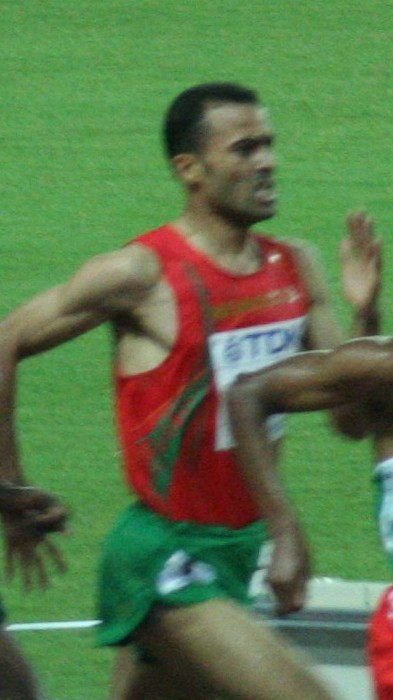
- Bellani in 2007

Personal information
- Born: 15 September 1979 (age 47) Marrakesh, Morocco

Sport
- Sport: Long-distance running
Medal record
Representing Morocco
Mediterranean Games
Gold medal – first place	2009 Pescara	10,000m
Silver medal – second place	2005 Almeria	5000m
Summer Universiade
Bronze medal – third place	2003 Daegu	5000m

Hicham Bellani (born 15 September 1979) is a Moroccan runner who specializes in the 3000 and 5000 metres.

== International competitions ==
Year	Competition	Venue	Position	Event	Notes
Representing Morocco
2001	Summer Universiade	Beijing, China	6th	5000 m	13:54.74
2003	Summer Universiade	Daegu, South Korea	3rd	5000 m	13:53.79
2004	World Indoor Championships	Budapest, Hungary	9th	3000 m	8:03.73
2004	Olympic Games	Athens, Greece	9th	5000 m	13:31.81
2004	Pan Arab Games	Algiers, Algeria	3rd	3000 m	13:32.41
2005	Mediterranean Games	Almería, Spain	2nd	5000 m	13:30.35
2005	World Championships	Osaka, Japan	20th (h)	5000 m	13:29.44
2006	World Cross Country Championships	Fukuoka, Japan	14th	Short race	Individual
2006	World Cross Country Championships	Fukuoka, Japan	3rd	Short race	Team
2006	World Athletics Final	Stuttgart, Germany	9th	3000 m	
2007	World Championships	Osaka, Japan	12th	5000 m	13:55.44
2009	Mediterranean Games	Pescara, Italy	1st	10,000 m	29:33.51
2009	Jeux de la Francophonie	Beirut, Lebanon	2nd	5000 m	13:45.53
2009	Jeux de la Francophonie	Beirut, Lebanon	3rd	10,000 m	29:43.39
2010	World Indoor Championships	Doha, Qatar	7th	3000 m	7:44.15
2013	Jeux de la Francophonie	Nice, France	1st	10,000 m	28:49.09
2013	Islamic Solidarity Games	Palembang, Indonesia	4th	10,000 m	30:27.99
2014	African Championships	Marrakesh, Morocco	–	5000 m	DNF

== Personal bests ==
- 1500 metres - 3:33.71 min (2007)
- 3000 metres - 7:33.71 min (2006)
- 5000 metres - 12:55.52 min (2006)
- 10000 metres - 29:43.39 min (2009)
- Half marathon - 1:01:44 hrs (2003)
