= Yukiko Osada =

Japanese swimmer (born 1981)

Personal information
- Nationality: Japan
- Born: 14 May 1981 (age 45) Yamanashi, Japan
- Height: 1.64 m (5 ft 4 1/2 in)
- Weight: 56 kg (123 lb)

Sport
- Sport: Swimming
- Strokes: Butterfly
Medal record
Women's swimming
Representing Japan
Universiade
Bronze medal – third place	2003 Daegu	200 m butterfly
Bronze medal – third place	2003 Daegu	4×100 m medley

Yukiko Osada (長田 友喜子, Osada Yukiko; born May 14, 1981 in Yamanashi) is a retired Japanese swimmer, who specialized in butterfly events. Osada won two bronze medals in the 200 m butterfly and the medley relay at the 2003 Summer Universiade in Daegu, South Korea.

Osada qualified for the women's 200 m butterfly at the 2004 Summer Olympics in Athens, by attaining an A-standard entry time of 2:09.97 from the national championships. In the morning's preliminary heats, she recorded the eighth fastest qualifying time of 2:11.20 to secure her spot in the semifinal run. On the evening session, Osada failed to qualify for the final run, as she placed thirteenth overall in the semifinals, with a fourth slowest time of 2:11.35.
