= Zarina Gizikova =

Russian rhythmic gymnast (born 1985)

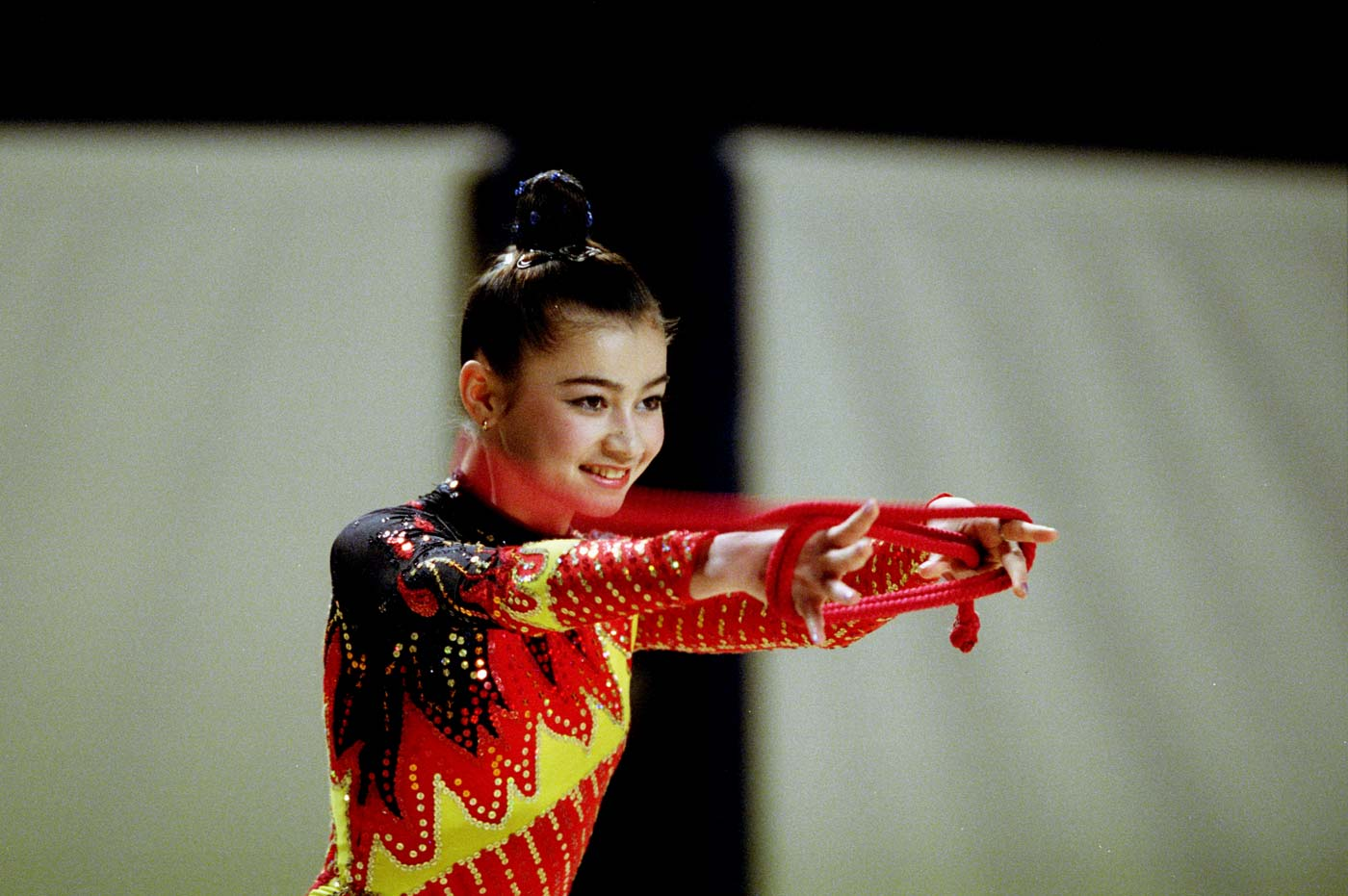
- Zarina Gizikova in 2002

Personal information
- Full name: Zarina Mayramovna Gizikova
- Nickname: Zayka
- Born: 20 June 1985 (age 41) Vladikavkaz, North Ossetia, Soviet Union

Gymnastics career
- Discipline: Rhythmic gymnastics
- Country represented: Russia; (1997-2005)
- Club: Gazprom
- Gym: Novogorsk
- Head coach: Irina Viner
- Assistant coach: Vera Shtelbaums
- Retired: 2005
Medal record
Rhythmic gymnastics
Representing Russia
European Championships
Gold medal – first place	2003 Riesa	Ball
Gold medal – first place	2002 Granada	Team
Silver medal – second place	2003 Riesa	Hoop
World Cup Final
Silver medal – second place	2002 Stuttgart	Hoop
Grand Prix Final
Gold medal – first place	2002 Innsbruck	Ball
Gold medal – first place	2002 Innsbruck	Hoop
Bronze medal – third place	2002 Innsbruck	Rope
Bronze medal – third place	2003 Innsbruck	Hoop
Summer Universiade
Bronze medal – third place	2003 Daegu	All-around
Bronze medal – third place	2003 Daegu	Ball
Bronze medal – third place	2003 Daegu	Clubs
Bronze medal – third place	2003 Daegu	Hoop
Bronze medal – third place	2003 Daegu	Ribbon

Zarina Mayramovna Gizikova (Russian: Зарина Майрамовна Гизикова; born 20 June 1985 in Vladikavkaz, North Ossetia, Russian Federation) is a Russian retired individual rhythmic gymnast, an Honored Master of Sports of Russia and the 2002 Russian National All-around champion.

== Career ==
Gizikova originally trained in Kyiv, Ukraine under the Deriugins School of Rhythmic Gymnastics. Gizikova and her family reclocated, continuing her training at the Olympic Center for Rhythmic Gymnastics in Moscow, Russia. Irina Viner facilitated Gizikova to be under the guidance of Personal trainer Vera Shtelbaums, who then was also the coach of Irina Tchachina. Gizikova was a very dynamic gymnast having excellent technique work led to success early in her career.

Gizikova became member of Russian national team in 1997. She appeared in junior competition in World Club event in 1998 and 1999 at Aeon Cup in Tokyo. Gizikova began appearing in senior competitions in 2000. With the suspension of Kabaeva and Tchachina in a year for doping, Gizikova and teammate Lyasan Utiasheva saw their emergence as Russia's new leading gymnasts. Gizikova became Russian National champion in 2002 and she was a member of the Russian Team that won gold at the 2002 European Championships. Unfortunately, due to her bad performance in her clubs routine, the russian coach Irina Viner gave her a hard and controversial sermon, which cast doubt her future in the team. She won silver in hoop at the 2002 World Cup Final in Stuttgart and won two gold medals (ball, hoop) at the 2002 Grand Prix Final in Innsbruck.

At the 2003 European Championships in Riesa, Gizikova won gold in ball and silver in hoop. She continued her success winning bronze in all-around and event finals at the 2003 Summer Universiade in Daegu. Gizikova later began again to struggle with consistency and with the reemergence of Kabaeva and Tchachina in Russia's National team saw Gizikova being overshadowed by her teammates and in her later career; in 2004 saw the rise of younger teammates Vera Sessina and Olga Kapranova, Gizikova finally completed her career in 2005.

In 2007, Gizikova and her sisters began coaching at the Palace of Sports in Storgino, Moscow and opened up their own gymnastics club.

== Personal life ==
Zarina has two older sisters (Inessa and Aziruchs Gizikova) who were also former rhythmic gymnasts. Her father was a former Soviet wrestler from North Ossetia and her mother, a former soviet skier of Korean descent.
