= Gymnastics at the 2003 Summer Universiade =

Gymnastics at the XXII Summer Universiade
- Venue: Daegu Athletics Arena
- Dates: August 21, 2003 – August 31, 2003

The gymnastics competition in the 2003 Summer Universiade were held in Daegu, South Korea.

== Combinated Medal table ==
Rank	Nation	Gold	Silver	Bronze	Total
1	Russia (RUS)	7	2	8	17
2	Ukraine (UKR)	5	7	5	17
3	China (CHN)	5	2	1	8
4	South Korea (KOR)	4	1	4	9
5	Kazakhstan (KAZ)	2	2	0	4
6	North Korea (PRK)	1	2	0	3
7	Belarus (BLR)	1	0	0	1
7	Latvia (LAT)	1	0	0	1
9	Japan (JPN)	0	2	4	6
10	Finland (FIN)	0	1	0	1
11	Poland (POL)	0	0	1	1
Totals (11 entries)		26	19	23	68

== Medal overview ==
=== Artistic gymnastics ===
==== Men's events ====
Event	Gold	Silver	Bronze
Team all-around	South Korea (KOR); Yang Tae-young; Yang Tae-seok; Lee Sun-sung; Shin Hyung-ook; Kim Dae-eun	Ukraine (UKR); Andriy Mykhaylychenko; Ruslan Mezentsev; Roman Zozulya; Serhiy Vyaltsev; Valeriy Honcharov	Japan (JPN); Yuki Yoshimura; Masaki Endo; Naoya Tabara; Akifumi Sasaki
Individual all-around	Yang Tae-young (KOR)	Yernar Yerimbetov (KAZ)	Yuki Yoshimura (JPN)
Horizontal Bar	Andriy Mykhaylychenko (UKR)	Jani Tanskanen (FIN)	Valeriy Honcharov (UKR); Yang Tae-seok (KOR)
Parallel Bars	Yang Tae-young (KOR); Yernar Yerimbetov (KAZ)	None awarded	Yuki Yoshimura (JPN)
Vault	Jevgēņijs Saproņenko (LAT); Yernar Yerimbetov (KAZ)	None awarded	Yang Tae-young (KOR)
Pommel Horse	Aleksey Ignatovich (BLR); Lu Bin (CHN)	None awarded	Yuriy Timofeyev (RUS)
Rings	Dong Zhen (CHN); Yang Tae-young (KOR)	None awarded	Roman Zozulya (UKR)
Floor Exercise	Li Dezhi (CHN)	Stepan Gorbachev (KAZ); Yang Tae-young (KOR)	None awarded

=== Women's events ===
Event	Gold	Silver	Bronze
Team all-around	China (CHN); Chen Miaojie; Wang Cili; Wan Chen; Yun Yang	Ukraine (UKR); Marina Proskurina; Natalia Sirobaba; Alona Kvasha; Irina Yarotska	Russia (RUS); Olga Azarkevich; Ekaterina Privalova; Maria Lozhkina; Olga Ugarova; Yulia Khorkhina
Individual all-around	Irina Yarotska (UKR)	Chen Miaojie (CHN)	Natalia Sirobaba (UKR)
Uneven Bars	Wan Chen (CHN)	Chen Miaojie (CHN)	Irina Yarotska (UKR)
Balance Beam	Irina Yarotska (UKR)	Kim Yong-Sil (PRK)	Chen Miaojie (CHN)
Vault	Kim Yong-Sil (PRK)	Marina Proskurina (UKR)	Joanna Skowrońska (POL)
Floor Exercise	Irina Yarotska (UKR)	Yekaterina Privalova (RUS)	Natalia Sirobaba (UKR)

== Medal table ==
Rank	Nation	Gold	Silver	Bronze	Total
1	China (CHN)	5	2	1	8
2	Ukraine (UKR)	4	3	5	12
3	South Korea (KOR)	4	1	2	7
4	Kazakhstan (KAZ)	2	2	0	4
5	North Korea (PRK)	1	1	0	2
6	Belarus (BLR)	1	0	0	1
6	Latvia (LAT)	1	0	0	1
8	Russia (RUS)	0	1	3	4
9	Finland (FIN)	0	1	0	1
10	Japan (JPN)	0	0	3	3
11	Poland (POL)	0	0	1	1
Totals (11 entries)		18	11	15	44

=== Rhythmic gymnastics ===
Event	Gold	Silver	Bronze
Individual All-Around	Irina Tchachina (RUS)	Anna Bessonova (UKR)	Zarina Gizikova (RUS)
Individual Ball	Irina Tchachina (RUS)	Anna Bessonova (UKR)	Zarina Gizikova (RUS)
Individual Clubs	Irina Tchachina (RUS)	Anna Bessonova (UKR)	Zarina Gizikova (RUS)
Individual Hoop	Irina Tchachina (RUS)	Anna Bessonova (UKR)	Zarina Gizikova (RUS)
Individual Ribbon	Anna Bessonova (UKR)	Irina Tchachina (RUS)	Zarina Gizikova (RUS)
Group all-around	Russia (RUS)	Japan (JPN)	South Korea (KOR)
5 Ribbons	Russia (RUS)	Japan (JPN)	South Korea (KOR)
3 Hoops + 2 Balls	Russia (RUS)	North Korea (PRK)	Japan (JPN)

== Medal table ==
Rank	Nation	Gold	Silver	Bronze	Total
1	Russia (RUS)	7	1	5	13
2	Ukraine (UKR)	1	4	0	5
3	Japan (JPN)	0	2	1	3
4	North Korea (PRK)	0	1	0	1
5	South Korea (KOR)	0	0	2	2
Totals (5 entries)		8	8	8	24
