= Gymnastics at the 1995 Summer Universiade =

Gymnastics competition

Gymnastics at the XVIII Summer Universiade
- Venue: Marine Messe

The gymnastics competition in the 1995 Summer Universiade were held in Fukuoka, Japan.

== Medal table ==
Rank	Nation	Gold	Silver	Bronze	Total
1	Bulgaria (BUL)	5	4	1	10
2	Russia (RUS)	4	4	5	13
3	China (CHN)	2	3	4	9
4	Belarus (BLR)	2	2	1	5
5	Hungary (HUN)	2	2	0	4
6	Japan (JPN)	1	1	4	6
7	South Korea (KOR)	1	1	2	4
8	Ukraine (UKR)	1	0	2	3
9	Croatia (CRO)	1	0	0	1
10	United States (USA)	0	3	1	4
11	Romania (ROU)	0	2	1	3
Totals (11 entries)		19	22	21	62

== Artistic gymnastics ==
=== Men's events ===
Event	Gold	Silver	Bronze
Individual all-around	Yevgeny Shabayev; Russia	Jeong Jin-su; South Korea	Vitaly Scherbo; Belarus; Cristian Leric; Romania
Team all-around	Japan (JPN); Yoshiaki Hatakeda; Hiromasa Masuda; M. Suzuki; Hikaru Tanaka; T. Yamazaki	China (CHN); Wang Xun; Li Bo; Chen Zhenyu; Dong Zhong; Wang Dong	Russia (RUS); Yevgeny Shabayev; Dmitri Vasilenko; Yury Gotov; E. Joukov
Rings	Aleksej Demjanov; Croatia	Wang Xun; China	Hiromasa Masuda; Japan; Hikaru Tanaka; Japan
Bar	Dong Zhong; China	Vitaly Scherbo; Belarus	Hikaru Tanaka; Japan
Parallel bar	Jeong Jin-su; South Korea	Vitaly Scherbo; Belarus	Dong Zhong; China
Vault	Vitaly Scherbo; Belarus	Cristian Leric; Romania	Wang Xun; China
Floor	Yevgeny Shabayev; Russia	Hiromasa Masuda; Japan	Jeong Jin-su; South Korea
Pommel horse	Zoltán Supola; Hungary	Marius Urzică; Romania	Yoshiaki Hatakeda; Japan; Han Yun-su; South Korea

=== Women's events ===
Event	Gold	Silver	Bronze
Individual all-around	Olha Shulha; Ukraine	Karin Lichey; United States	Guan Yuqing; China
Team all-around	Russia (RUS); Irina Golub; O. Postavets; M. Goriounova; Oksana Sivovol; Aliakrinskai	United States (USA); K. Guise; Heidi Hornbeek; Karin Lichey; K. Maty; A. Murakami	China (CHN); Ding Yan; Fan Di; Guan Yuqing; Yang X. Yuan Kexia
Uneven bars	Ding Yan; China	Heidi Hornbeek; United States	Irina Golub; Russia
Vault	Eszter Óváry; Hungary	Ildiko Dragoner; Hungary	Oksana Sivovol; Russia
Floor	Olga Yurkina; Belarus	Eszter Óváry; Hungary	Olha Shulha; Ukraine; Natalia Kalinina; Ukraine
Balance beam	Oksana Sivovol; Russia	Yuan Kexia; China	Heidi Hornbeek; United States

== Medal table ==
Rank	Nation	Gold	Silver	Bronze	Total
1	Russia (RUS)	4	0	3	7
2	China (CHN)	2	3	4	9
3	Belarus (BLR)	2	2	1	5
4	Hungary (HUN)	2	2	0	4
5	Japan (JPN)	1	1	4	6
6	South Korea (KOR)	1	1	2	4
7	Ukraine (UKR)	1	0	2	3
8	Croatia (CRO)	1	0	0	1
9	United States (USA)	0	3	1	4
10	Romania (ROU)	0	2	1	3
Totals (10 entries)		14	14	18	46

== Rhythmic gymnastics ==
Event	Gold	Silver	Bronze
Individual all-around	Maria Petrova; Bulgaria	Inessa Gizikova; Russia	Diana Popova; Bulgaria
Rope	Maria Petrova; Bulgaria	Diana Popova; Bulgaria	Inessa Gizikova; Russia
Ball	Maria Petrova; Bulgaria	Diana Popova; Bulgaria; Inessa Gizikova; Russia; Olga Mikhalskaia; Russia	
Clubs	Maria Petrova; Bulgaria	Diana Popova; Bulgaria	Inessa Gizikova; Russia
Ribbon	Maria Petrova; Bulgaria	Diana Popova; Bulgaria; Inessa Gizikova; Russia	

=== Medal table ===
Rank	Nation	Gold	Silver	Bronze	Total
1	Bulgaria (BUL)	5	4	1	10
2	Russia (RUS)	0	4	2	6
Totals (2 entries)		5	8	3	16

== External sources ==
- Gymnastics results of the 1995 Summer Universiade
- Results on sports123.com
