= Gymnastics at the 2001 Summer Universiade =

Gymnastic event

Gymnastics at the XXI Summer Universiade

The gymnastics competition in the 2001 Summer Universiade were held in Beijing, PR China.

== Combinated Medal table ==
| Rank | Nation | Gold | Silver | Bronze | Total |
|---|---|---|---|---|---|
| 1 | China (CHN) | 8 | 8 | 5 | 21 |
| 2 | Russia (RUS) | 5 | 4 | 5 | 14 |
| 3 | Ukraine (UKR) | 4 | 1 | 0 | 5 |
| 4 | Japan (JPN) | 1 | 4 | 3 | 8 |
| 5 | North Korea (PRK) | 1 | 0 | 1 | 2 |
| 6 | Australia (AUS) | 1 | 0 | 0 | 1 |
| 6 | France (FRA) | 1 | 0 | 0 | 1 |
| 6 | Romania (ROU) | 1 | 0 | 0 | 1 |
| 9 | Belarus (BLR) | 0 | 3 | 4 | 7 |
| 10 | South Korea (KOR) | 0 | 1 | 2 | 3 |
| 11 | Brazil (BRA) | 0 | 1 | 0 | 1 |
| 11 | Latvia (LAT) | 0 | 1 | 0 | 1 |
| 11 | Poland (POL) | 0 | 1 | 0 | 1 |
| 14 | Cyprus (CYP) | 0 | 0 | 1 | 1 |
| Totals (14 entries) | | 22 | 24 | 21 | 67 |

== Men's events ==
| Event | Gold | Silver | Bronze |
|---|---|---|---|
| All Round | Yang Wei (CHN) | Naoya Tsukahara (JPN); Hiroyuki Tomita (JPN) | |
| Floor | Liang Fuliang (CHN) | Igors Vihrovs (LAT) | Dmitry Kasperovich (BLR); Zheng Lihui (CHN) |
| Horizontal Bar | Philippe Rizzo (AUS) | Xing Aowei (CHN) | Liang Fuliang (CHN) |
| Parallel Bars | Hiroyuki Tomita (JPN) | Liang Fuliang (CHN) | Aleksey Sinkevich (BLR) |
| Vault | Benoît Caranobe (FRA) | Yang Wei (CHN) | Yang Tae-young (KOR) |
| Pommel Horse | Ioan Silviu Suciu (ROM) | Xing Aowei (CHN); Hiroyuki Tomita (JPN) | |
| Rings | Zhang Shangwu (CHN) | Kim Dong-hwa (KOR) | Irodotos Georgallas (CYP) |
| Team | China (CHN) | Japan (JPN) | South Korea (KOR) |

== Women's Event ==
| Event | Gold | Silver | Bronze |
|---|---|---|---|
| All Round | Ludmila Ezhova (RUS) | Ekaterina Privalova (RUS) | Bai Chunyue (CHN) |
| Uneven Bars | Ekaterina Privalova (RUS) | Ling Jie (CHN) | Ludmila Ezhova (RUS) |
| Balance Beam | Ludmila Ezhova (RUS) | Bai Chunyue (CHN) | Ekaterina Privalova (RUS) |
| Vault | Son Un-hui (PRK) | Joanna Skowrońska (POL) | Olga Ugarova (RUS) |
| Floor Exercise | Dong Fangxiao (CHN) | Daiane dos Santos (BRA) | Liu Wei (CHN) |
| Team | China (CHN) | Russia (RUS) | North Korea (PRK) |

=== Medal table ===
| Rank | Nation | Gold | Silver | Bronze | Total |
|---|---|---|---|---|---|
| 1 | China (CHN) | 6 | 6 | 4 | 16 |
| 2 | Russia (RUS) | 3 | 2 | 3 | 8 |
| 3 | Japan (JPN) | 1 | 4 | 0 | 5 |
| 4 | North Korea (PRK) | 1 | 0 | 1 | 2 |
| 5 | Australia (AUS) | 1 | 0 | 0 | 1 |
| 5 | France (FRA) | 1 | 0 | 0 | 1 |
| 5 | Romania (ROU) | 1 | 0 | 0 | 1 |
| 8 | South Korea (KOR) | 0 | 1 | 2 | 3 |
| 9 | Brazil (BRA) | 0 | 1 | 0 | 1 |
| 9 | Latvia (LAT) | 0 | 1 | 0 | 1 |
| 9 | Poland (POL) | 0 | 1 | 0 | 1 |
| 12 | Belarus (BLR) | 0 | 0 | 2 | 2 |
| 13 | Cyprus (CYP) | 0 | 0 | 1 | 1 |
| Totals (13 entries) | | 14 | 16 | 13 | 43 |

== Rhythmic Gymnastics ==
| Event | Gold | Silver | Bronze |
|---|---|---|---|
| All Round | Tamara Yerofeeva (UKR) | Elena Tkachenko (BLR) | Olga Belova (RUS) |
| Ball | Tamara Yerofeeva (UKR) | Elena Tkachenko (BLR) | Zhong Ling (CHN) |
| Rope | Tamara Yerofeeva (UKR) | Elena Tkachenko (BLR) | Olga Belova (RUS) |
| Hoop | Tamara Yerofeeva (UKR) | Zhong Ling (CHN) | Elena Tkachenko (BLR) |
| Clubs | Olga Belova (RUS) | Tamara Yerofeeva (UKR) | Elena Tkachenko (BLR) |
| Team all-round | Russia (RUS) | China (CHN) | Japan (JPN) |
| Team 5 Ribbons | China (CHN) | Russia (RUS) | Japan (JPN) |
| Team 3 Hoops + 2 Balls | China (CHN) | Russia (RUS) | Japan (JPN) |

=== Medal table ===
| Rank | Nation | Gold | Silver | Bronze | Total |
|---|---|---|---|---|---|
| 1 | Ukraine (UKR) | 4 | 1 | 0 | 5 |
| 2 | Russia (RUS) | 2 | 2 | 2 | 6 |
| 3 | China (CHN) | 2 | 2 | 1 | 5 |
| 4 | Belarus (BLR) | 0 | 3 | 2 | 5 |
| 5 | Japan (JPN) | 0 | 0 | 3 | 3 |
| Totals (5 entries) | | 8 | 8 | 8 | 24 |
