= Valeriy Honcharov =

Ukrainian gymnast (born 1977)

- 'Валерій Гончаров
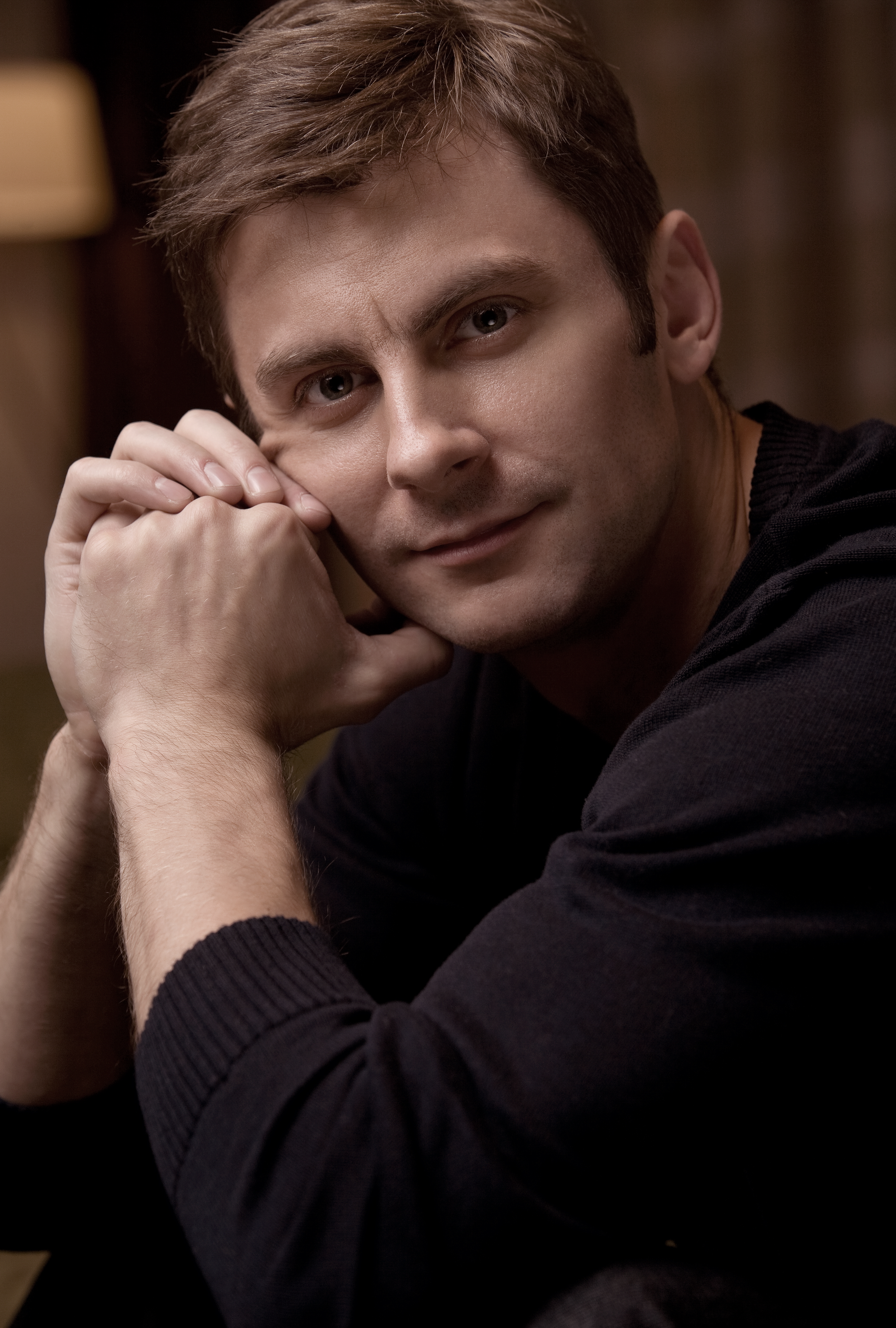
- Honcharov in 2008

Personal information
- Born: September 19, 1977 (age 49)

Gymnastics career
- Discipline: Men's artistic gymnastics
- Country represented: Ukraine
Medal record
Olympic Games
Gold medal – first place	2004 Athens	Parallel Bars
Silver medal – second place	2000 Sydney	Team competition
World Championships
Bronze medal – third place	2005 Melbourne	High bar
European Championships
Silver medal – second place	2004 Amsterdam	Parallel Bars
Bronze medal – third place	2005 Debrecen	Parallel Bars
World Cup Final
Gold medal – first place	2004 Birmingham	Horizontal Bar
Bronze medal – third place	2006 São Paulo	Parallel Bars
Bronze medal – third place	2008 Madrid	Parallel Bars
Summer Universiade
Silver medal – second place	2003 Daegu	Team
Bronze medal – third place	2003 Daegu	Horizontal bar

Valeriy Honcharov (also spelled Goncharov, Ukrainian: 'Валерій Гончаров, romanized: Valeriy Honcharov, born 19 September 1977) is a gymnast from Ukraine. He won gold in the men's parallel bars apparatus at the 2004 Summer Olympics in Athens.
