= Athletics at the 2003 Summer Universiade – Men's 5000 metres =

The men's 5000 metres event at the 2003 Summer Universiade was held on 29 August in Daegu, South Korea.

== Results ==
Rank	Athlete	Nationality	Time	Notes
1st place, gold medalist(s)	Serhiy Lebid	Ukraine	13:50.94	
2nd place, silver medalist(s)	Jan Fitschen	Germany	13:53.06	
3rd place, bronze medalist(s)	Hicham Bellani	Morocco	13:53.79	
4	Carles Castillejo	Spain	13:57.20	
5	Michael Power	Australia	13:57.72	
6	Ryuichi Hashinokuchi	Japan	13:59.88	
7	Tonny Okello	Uganda	14:00.79	
8	Mark Tucker	Australia	14:05.33	
9	Ruben Ramolefi	South Africa	14:08.49	
10	Karim El Mabchour	Morocco	14:12.46	
11	Yoo Sung-ho	South Korea	14:17.95	
12	Reid Coolsaet	Canada	14:17.96	
13	Uem Hyo-seock	South Korea	14:26.08	
14	José Augusto Acierno	Mexico	14:26.83	
15	Serapio Galindo	Peru	15:05.31	
16	Omar Abdi Hamid Hassan	Somalia	15:33.32	
17	Faraj Entaifa	Libya	15:33.49	
18	Galagamalwila Sugath Kumara	Sri Lanka	16:31.82	
	Halil Akkaş	Turkey	DNS	
	Biruk Gelan	Ethiopia	DNS	
