= Igor Gorbokon =

Ukrainian judoka

Personal information
- Born: 13 October 1973 (age 53)
- Occupation: Judoka

Sport
- Sport: Judo
Medal record
Representing Ukraine
Summer Universiade
| Silver medal – second place | 1999 Palma de Mallorca | Half heavyweight |

Profile at external databases
- JudoInside.com: 479

Igor Gorbokon (Ukrainian: Ігор Петрович Горбоконь; born 13 October 1973) is a Ukrainian samboist and judoka, bronze medalist of the European Sambo Championship, silver medalist of the World Sambo Championship, winner and medalist of international judo tournaments.

== Achievements ==
| Year | Tournament | Place | Weight class |
|---|---|---|---|
| 2001 | Summer Universiade | 7th | Half heavyweight (100 kg) |
| 1999 | Summer Universiade | 2nd | Half heavyweight (100 kg) |
| 1994 | European Judo Championships | 5th | Half heavyweight (95 kg) |
