= Swimming at the 2003 Summer Universiade =

Swimming at the XXII Summer Universiade
- Venues: Duryu Aquatic Park
- Dates: 24 August 2003 – 30 August 2003

The swimming competition during the 2003 Summer Universiade, also known as the XXII Summer Universiade, took place in Daegu, South Korea from August 24 till August 30, 2003.

== Men's events ==
Event	Gold		Silver		Bronze	
50 m freestyle	Vyacheslav Shyrshov (UKR)	22.59	Peter Mankoč (SLO)	22.77	Andrey Kapralov (RUS)	22.81
100 m freestyle	Andrey Kapralov (RUS)	49.36	Chris Cozens (GBR)	49.94	Yuriy Yegoshin (UKR)	50.02
200 m freestyle	Yoshihiro Okumura (JPN)	1:49.82	Peter Mankoč (SLO)	1:50.10	Ross Davenport (GBR)	1:50.51
400 m freestyle	Yuri Prilukov (RUS)	3:52.27	Justin Mortimer (USA)	3:52.73	Dragoş Coman (ROU)	3:53.26
800 m freestyle	Yuri Prilukov (RUS)	7:54.18	Igor Chervynskyi (UKR)	7:57.21	Peter Vanderkaay (USA)	7:59.22
1500 m freestyle	Yuri Prilukov (RUS)	15:12.13	Igor Chervynskyi (UKR)	15:14.46	Peter Vanderkaay (USA)	15:19.44
50 m backstroke	James Westcott (USA)	25.80	Ouyang Kunpeng (CHN)	25.82	Vyacheslav Shyrshov (UKR)	25.88
100 m backstroke	Ouyang Kunpeng (CHN)	54.99	James Westcott (USA)	55.35	Volodymyr Nikolaychuk (UKR)	55.70
200 m backstroke	Ouyang Kunpeng (CHN)	1:59.17	Takashi Nakano (JPN)	2:01.60	Chris DeJong (USA)	2:01.63
50 m breaststroke	James Gibson (GBR)	27.92	Oleg Lisogor (UKR)	27.94	Mihály Flaskay (HUN)	28.05
100 m breaststroke	James Gibson (GBR)	1:00.71	Chris Cook (GBR)	1:01.28	Oleg Lisogor (UKR)	1:01.69
200 m breaststroke	Sergei Gerasimov (RUS)	2:13.78	Daisuke Kimura (JPN)	2:14.00	Michael Williamson (IRL)	2:15.52
50 m butterfly	Andriy Serdinov (UKR)	23.93	Sergiy Breus (UKR)	24.04	Yevgeni Korotyshkin (RUS)	24.11
100 m butterfly	Andriy Serdinov (UKR)	51.99	Yevgeni Korotyshkin (RUS)	52.94	Ryo Takayasu (JPN)	53.42
200 m butterfly	Takeshi Matsuda (JPN)	1:57.44	Sergiy Advena (UKR)	1:58.74	Jeremy Knowles (BAH)	1:59.21
200 m individual medley	Takahiro Mori (JPN)	2:00.59	Joe Bruckart (USA)	2:01.57	Adam Lucas (AUS)	2:03.06
400 m individual medley	Takahiro Mori (JPN)	4:17.23	Eric Shanteau (USA)	4:19.82	Michael Halika (ISR)	4:20.52
4×100 m freestyle relay	Great Britain (GBR); Chris Cozens; Alex Scotcher; Ross Davenport; Matthew Kidd	3:22.09	Ukraine (UKR); Vyacheslav Shyrshov; Denys Syzonenko; Andriy Serdinov; Yuriy Yegoshin	3:22.37	Australia (AUS); Andrew Dyson; Patrick Murphy; Benjamin Denner; Andrew Mewing	3:22.80
4×200 m freestyle relay	Russia (RUS); Andrey Kapralov; Maxim Kuznetsov; Dmitry Chernyshov; Yuri Prilukov	7:19.63	United States (USA); Joseph Bruckart; Justin Mortimer; Chris Kemp; Peter Vanderkaay	7:20.67	Italy (ITA); Andrea Frovi; David Berbotto; Andrea Beccari; Federico Cappellazzo	7:20.92
4×100 m medley relay	Ukraine (UKR); Volodymyr Nikolaychuk; Oleg Lisogor; Andriy Serdinov; Yuriy Yegoshin	3:47.46	Russia (RUS); Dmitri Smirnov; Roman Ivanovsky; Yevgeni Korotyshkin; Andrey Kapralov	3:39.05	United States (USA); James Westcott; Wilson Brandt; John Abercrombie; Joseph Bruckart	3:40.18

== Women's events ==
Event	Gold		Silver		Bronze	
50 m freestyle	Olga Mukomol (UKR)	25.57	Michelle Engelsman (AUS)	25.89	Petra Dallmann (GER)	25.93
100 m freestyle	Petra Dallmann (GER)	55.51	Xu Yanwei (CHN)	55.88	Tomoko Nagai (JPN)	56.11
200 m freestyle	Yana Klochkova (UKR)	1:59.03; NR	Solenne Figuès (FRA)	1:59.66	Pang Jiaying (CHN)	2:00.76
400 m freestyle	Rebecca Cooke (GBR)	4:11.23	Chen Hua (CHN)	4:11.94	Magda Dyszkiewicz (USA)	4:12.52
800 m freestyle	Rebecca Cooke (GBR)	8:33.84	Chen Hua (CHN)	8:35.70	Olga Beresnyeva (UKR)	8:36.66
1500 m freestyle	Rebecca Cooke (GBR)	16:14.70	Adrienne Binder (USA)	16:19.32	Lauren Costella (USA)	16:24.43
50 m backstroke	Ilona Hlaváčková (CZE)	29.04	Beth Botsford (USA)	29.27	Aya Terakawa (JPN)	29.43
100 m backstroke	Ilona Hlaváčková (CZE)	1:01.74	Reiko Nakamura (JPN)	1:02.18	Aya Terakawa (JPN)	1:02.43
200 m backstroke	Reiko Nakamura (JPN)	2:12.17	Aya Terakawa (JPN)	2:13.21	Erin Volcán (USA)	2:13.82
50 m breaststroke	Luo Xuejuan (CHN)	31.39	Jade Edmistone (AUS)	31.74	Ashley Roby (USA)	31.92
100 m breaststroke	Luo Xuejuan (CHN)	1:07.45	Qi Hui (CHN)	1:08.76	Rachel Genner (GBR)	1:09.72
200 m breaststroke	Qi Hui (CHN)	2:26.25	Luo Xuejuan (CHN)	2:26.99	Fumiko Kawanabe (JPN)	2:31.06
50 m butterfly	Shannon Catalano (USA)	27.56	Irina Bespalova (RUS)	27.75	Kate Corkran (AUS)	27.76
100 m butterfly	Demerae Christianson (USA)	1:00.42	Kate Corkran (AUS)	1:00.59	Irina Bespalova (RUS)	1:00.66
200 m butterfly	Yana Klochkova (UKR)	2:09.52; NR	Paola Cavallino (ITA)	2:11.52	Yukiko Osada (JPN)	2:12.59
200 m individual medley	Yana Klochkova (UKR)	2:13.32	Qi Hui (CHN)	2:15.86	Maiko Fujino (JPN)	2:17.41
400 m individual medley	Yana Klochkova (UKR)	4:45.01	Maiko Fujino (JPN)	4:48.44	Rebecca Cooke (GBR)	4:48.59
4×100 m freestyle relay	France (FRA); Aurore Mongel; Céline Couderc; Magali Monchaux; Solenne Figuès	3:45.50	United States (USA); Rebekah Short; Jessica Perruquet; Marie Marsman; Stephanie Williams	3:45.68	China (CHN); Xu Yanwei; Zhan Shu; Pang Jiaying; Chen Hua	3:47.50
4×200 m freestyle relay	China (CHN); Xu Yanwei; Qi Hui; Chen Hua; Pang Jiaying	8:05.86	United States (USA); Magdalena Dyszkiewicz; Heather Kemp; Jessica Perruquet; Stephanie Williams	8:08.84	Russia (RUS); Nataliya Shalagina; Irina Korovina; Irina Ufimtseva; Ekaterina Nasyrova	8:13.99
4×100 m medley relay	China (CHN); Zhan Shu; Luo Xuejuan; Xu Yanwei; Pang Jiaying	4:06.22	United States (USA); Beth Botsford; Ashley Roby; Demaere Christianson; Stephanie Williams	4:07.63	Japan (JPN); Reiko Nakamura; Fumiko Kawanabe; Yukiko Osada; Tomoko Nagai	4:08.89

== Medal table ==
Rank	Nation	Gold	Silver	Bronze	Total
1	Ukraine (UKR)	9	5	6	20
2	China (CHN)	7	7	2	16
3	Russia (RUS)	6	3	4	13
4	Great Britain (GBR)	6	2	3	11
5	Japan (JPN)	5	5	8	18
6	United States (USA)	3	10	8	21
7	Czech Republic (CZE)	2	0	0	2
8	France (FRA)	1	1	0	2
9	Germany (GER)	1	0	1	2
10	Australia (AUS)	0	4	2	6
11	Slovenia (SLO)	0	2	0	2
12	Italy (ITA)	0	1	1	2
13	Bahamas (BAH)	0	0	1	1
13	Hungary (HUN)	0	0	1	1
13	Ireland (IRL)	0	0	1	1
13	Israel (ISR)	0	0	1	1
13	Romania (ROM)	0	0	1	1
Totals (17 entries)		40	40	40	120
