= Athletics at the 2001 Summer Universiade – Men's 5000 metres =

The men's 5000 metres event at the 2001 Summer Universiade was held in Beijing, China between 30 August and 1 September.

== Medalists ==
Gold	Silver	Bronze
Serhiy Lebid; Ukraine	Mikhail Yeginov; Russia	Christian Belz; Switzerland

== Results ==
=== Heats ===
Rank	Heat	Athlete	Nationality	Time	Notes
1	1	Serhiy Lebid	Ukraine	13:40.23	Q
2	1	Matthew Lane	United States	13:41.06	Q
3	1	Mikhail Yeginov	Russia	13:41.70	Q
4	1	Christian Belz	Switzerland	13:43.41	Q
5	1	Rubin McRae	New Zealand	13:45.42	Q
6	1	Pablo Villalobos	Spain	13:49.89	q
7	1	Ryuichi Hashinokuchi	Japan	13:55.59	q
8	1	Rachid Boulahdid	Morocco	14:01.29	q
9	2	Jan Fitschen	Germany	14:07.78	Q
10	2	Kazuyoshi Tokumoto	Japan	14:07.97	Q
11	2	Dmytro Baranovskyy	Ukraine	14:08.55	Q
12	2	Hicham Bellani	Morocco	14:09.33	Q
13	2	Jonathon Riley	United States	14:10.23	Q
14	2	Paul McRae	New Zealand	14:14.21	q
15	1	Chris Thompson	Great Britain	14:16.45	q
16	2	Joshua Chelimo	Uganda	14:21.09	
17	2	Fabio Cesari	Italy	14:21.89	
18	2	Peter Watson	Canada	14:22.29	
19	2	Yawo Kloutse	Togo	15:01.19	NJR
20	2	Wilfred Kunfong	Nigeria	15:07.07	
21	1	Ahmad Al-Matari	Jordan	15:26.03	
22	1	Jeremia Mutikisha	Namibia	15:39.52	
23	2	Bill Hedges do Santo	São Tomé and Príncipe	15:53.90	
24	1	Elijah Tukashabaruhanga	Uganda	15:59.09	
25	1	Khaled Al-Minji	Oman	17:00.14	

=== Final ===
Rank	Athlete	Nationality	Time	Notes
1st place, gold medalist(s)	Serhiy Lebid	Ukraine	13:44.24	
2nd place, silver medalist(s)	Mikhail Yeginov	Russia	13:46.63	
3rd place, bronze medalist(s)	Christian Belz	Switzerland	13:48.21	
4	Matthew Lane	United States	13:48.90	
5	Kazuyoshi Tokumoto	Japan	13:51.64	
6	Hicham Bellani	Morocco	13:54.74	
7	Dmytro Baranovskyy	Ukraine	13:56.03	
8	Chris Thompson	Great Britain	13:56.55	
9	Jan Fitschen	Germany	14:05.40	
10	Rachid Boulahdid	Morocco	14:06.50	
11	Rubin McRae	New Zealand	14:12.96	
12	Pablo Villalobos	Spain	14:15.52	
13	Ryuichi Hashinokuchi	Japan	14:18.77	
14	Jonathon Riley	United States	14:26.63	
15	Paul McRae	New Zealand	14:50.76	
