= Olha Teslenko =

Ukrainian artistic gymnast (born 1981)

- Born: 23 May 1981 (age 45) Kirovohrad, Ukrainian SSR, Soviet Union
- Height: 151 cm (4 ft 11 in)

Gymnastics career
- Discipline: Women's artistic gymnastics
- Country represented: Ukraine
Medal record
Women's artistic gymnastics
Representing Ukraine
World Championships
Bronze medal – third place	1999 Tianjin	Team
European Championships
Silver medal – second place	1998 Saint Petersburg	Balance beam
Bronze medal – third place	1998 Saint Petersburg	Team
European Team Championships
Silver medal – second place	1999 Patras	Team
Goodwill Games
Silver medal – second place	1998 New York	Balance beam
Summer Universiade
Silver medal – second place	1999 Mallorca	Team
Silver medal – second place	1999 Mallorca	Uneven bars
Junior European Championships
Silver medal – second place	1996 Birmingham	Uneven bars
Bronze medal – third place	1996 Birmingham	Team

Olha Teslenko (born 23 May 1981) is a Ukrainian former artistic gymnast. She competed at the 1996 and 2000 Summer Olympics.

== See also ==
- List of Olympic female gymnasts for Ukraine
