= Tamara Yerofeeva =

Ukrainian rhythmic gymnast (born 1982)

Tamara Yerofeyeva (Yerofeeva)
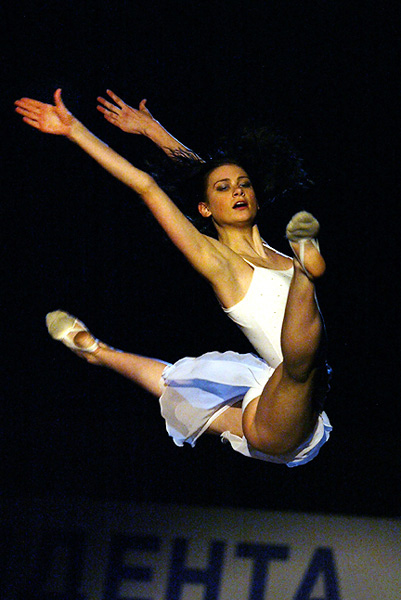
- Tamara Yerofeyeva performs gala at 2003 Deriugina Cup

Personal information
- Full name: Tamara Anatoliyivna Yerofeyeva
- Born: 4 March 1982 (age 44) Kiev, Ukrainian SSR, Soviet Union
- Height: 175 cm (5 ft 9 in)

Gymnastics career
- Discipline: Rhythmic gymnastics
- Country represented: Ukraine; (1996-2004)
- Club: Deriugina School
- Head coach: Irina Deriugina
- Assistant coach: Albina Deriugina
- Choreographer: Irina Deriugina
- Retired: 2004
Medal record
Representing Ukraine
World Championships
Gold medal – first place	2001 Madrid	All-around
Gold medal – first place	2001 Madrid	Rope
Gold medal – first place	2001 Madrid	Team
Gold medal – first place	2002 N.Orleans	5 ribbons
Silver medal – second place	2003 Budapest	Team
Bronze medal – third place	1997 Berlin	Team
Bronze medal – third place	1998 Seville	3 ribbons/2 hoops
Bronze medal – third place	1998 Seville	5 balls
Bronze medal – third place	1999 Osaka	Ball
Bronze medal – third place	1999 Osaka	Team
Bronze medal – third place	2001 Madrid	Hoop
Bronze medal – third place	2001 Madrid	Ball
Bronze medal – third place	2001 Madrid	Clubs
European Championships
Silver medal – second place	1997 Patras	5 balls
Silver medal – second place	1998 Porto	Team
Silver medal – second place	2000 Saragoza	Rope
Silver medal – second place	2002 Granada	All-around
Silver medal – second place	2002 Granada	Team
Silver medal – second place	2003 Riesa	Clubs
Silver medal – second place	2004 Kyiv	Team
Bronze medal – third place	1997 Patras	Group All-around
Bronze medal – third place	2001 Geneva	Hoop
Bronze medal – third place	2001 Geneva	Clubs
Bronze medal – third place	2003 Riesa	Hoop
Bronze medal – third place	2003 Riesa	Ribbon
European Team Championships
Silver medal – second place	2001 Riesa	Team
World Cup Final
Bronze medal – third place	2002 Stuttgart	Hoop
Bronze medal – third place	2002 Stuttgart	Ball
Bronze medal – third place	2002 Stuttgart	Clubs
Grand Prix Final
Gold medal – first place	2002 Innsbruck	All-around
Gold medal – first place	2002 Innsbruck	Clubs
Silver medal – second place	2000 Deventer	Rope
Silver medal – second place	2000 Deventer	Hoop
Silver medal – second place	2000 Deventer	Ribbon
Silver medal – second place	2002 Innsbruck	Hoop
Bronze medal – third place	1999 Korneuburg	Rope
Bronze medal – third place	2000 Deventer	All-around
Bronze medal – third place	2002 Innsbruck	Ball
Summer Universiade
Gold medal – first place	2001 Beijing	All-around
Gold medal – first place	2001 Beijing	Rope
Gold medal – first place	2001 Beijing	Hoop
Gold medal – first place	2001 Beijing	Ball
Silver medal – second place	2001 Beijing	Clubs
World Youth Games (seniors)
Silver medal – second place	1998 Moscow	Ribbon
Silver medal – second place	1998 Moscow	Hoop
Silver medal – second place	1998 Moscow	Rope
Bronze medal – third place	1998 Moscow	Clubs

Tamara Anatoliyivna Yerofeyeva (Ukrainian: Тамара Анатоліївна Єрофеєва, Russian: Тамара Анатольевна Ерофеева; born 4 March 1982) also written Tamara Yerofeeva, is a former Ukrainian individual rhythmic gymnast. She was all-around World Champion, multiple-time World Cup winner, World Universiade winner, and an Olympic Games finalist. Yerofeyeva was a member of the national team from 1996 to 2004 and won more than 300 medals for Ukraine at various competitions.

She currently lives in Las Vegas, USA. She performed her solo hoops act at different shows, including Cirque Du Soleil, Spiegelworld, and David Saxe Productions, and now she organizes series of rhythmic gymnastics agg competitions “Tamara Cup” and works as the head coach at a rhythmic gymnastics club “Rhythmic Gymnastics of Las Vegas”.

== Career ==
Yerofeeva started rhythmic gymnastics at the age of 6 in Kyiv, Ukraine. When she was 12, she was invited to the Deriugina School and soon thereafter joined the national team.

In 1998, Yerofeyeva participated at the 1998 World Youth Games in Moscow and won gold medal in ribbon, silver with hoop and rope and a bronze in clubs in senior competition. In 2001, when Yerofeyeva was 19, she became a leader of the Ukrainian National Olympic Team. She was a four-time World champion, four-time World Cup winner, seven-time silver medalist at the European Championships, four-time gold medalist at the 2001 World Universiade, and placed sixth in the all-around final at the 2000 Sydney Olympics.

She retired from competition in 2004, right before Olympic Games in Athens. After her retirement, she created a solo hoops act and performed with various entertainment companies, including Cirque Du Soleil. Currently, she lives in Las Vegas. She performed at different shows, including "Zumanity" by Cirque Du Soleil at New York, New York Resort and Casino, "V The Ultimate Variety Show" and musical "VEGAS!-The Show" at the Planet Hollywood Resort and Casino. She finished her career as a performing artist in 2024 and now she organizes a series of very popular RG and AGG competitions “TAMARA CUP”, and works as the head coach at the "Aerial Athletica" gymnastics club.

== Personal life ==
Yerofeyeva is married to Stoyan Metchkarov, with whom she has a son named Alexander.

== Routine music information ==
Year	Apparatus	Music title
2004	Hoop	Music from Pirates of the Caribbean by Klaus Badelt
2004	Ball	Music from The Life of David Gale
2004	Clubs	El Tango de Roxanne music from Moulin Rouge! by Ewan McGregor & Jose Feliciano & Jacek Koman
2004	Ribbon	Act 1 finale Death of Giselle, Love Scene music from Giselle by Adolphe Adam
2003	Hoop	Baba Yaga music from Pictures from an Exhibition by Modest Petrovich Mussorgsky
2003	Ball	Spring Love by Giovanni Marradi
2003	Clubs	El Tango de Roxanne music from Moulin Rouge! by Ewan McGregor & Jose Feliciano & Jacek Koman
2003	Ribbon	The Apartment / At the Bank / Hotel Regina music from The Bourne Identity by John Powell
2002	Hoop	Barbarian Horde, The Battle music from Gladiator by Hans Zimmer
2002	Rope	Tribal War music from Black Hawk Down by Hans Zimmer
2002	Clubs	In the Tunnels / Hummell Gets the Rockets music from The Rock by Harry Gregson-Williams & Nick Glennie-Smith & Hans Zimmer
2002	Ball	Surrounded music from The Man in the Iron Mask by Nick Glennie-Smith
2001	Hoop	Barbarian Horde music from Gladiator by Hans Zimmer, Lisa Gerrard
2001	Rope	Frenazo music from Bedazzled by Tony Phillips
2001	Clubs	Libertango by Astor Piazzolla
2001	Ball	The Skulls, The Race, Reprise music from The Skulls by Randy Edelman
2000	Hoop	Main Title music from Enemy of the State by Trevor Rabin & Harry Gregson-Williams
2000	Rope	Main Theme music from The Saint by Graeme Revell
2000	Ball	Ispoved (Confession) by Bustrayakov
2000	Ribbon	The Tunnel Part 1 music from Enemy of the State by Harry Gregson-Williams / Trevor Rabin
1999	Hoop	Mr. Mellow / Megalith by T-Square
1999	Rope	Main Theme music from The Saint by Graeme Revell
1999	Ball	Heat Miser by Massive Attack
1999	Ribbon	Grand Central (from Carlito's Way) by Patrick Doyle
1998	Rope	Luna de Paris by Raúl di Blasio
1998	Clubs	Libertango by Astor Piazzolla
1998	Ball	Specialist (From The Specialist) by John Barry, Royal Philharmonic Orchestra
1998	Ribbon	Grand Central (from Carlito's Way) by Patrick Doyle
1997	Hoop	An Unending Story (Alternate) / An Unending Story (Film Version) music from Basic Instinct by Jerry Goldsmith
1997	Rope	Gopak by Vladimir Bustriakov
1997	Clubs	Libertango by Astor Piazzolla
1997	Ribbon	Grand Central (from Carlito's Way) by Patrick Doyle

== Detailed Olympic results ==
Year	Competition Description	Location	Music	Apparatus	Score-Final	Score-Qualifying
2000	Olympics	Sydney		All-around	39.000	38.899
2000	Olympics	Sydney	Grand Central (from Carlito's Way) by Patrick Doyle	Ribbon	9.750	9.708
2000	Olympics	Sydney	Ispoved (Confession) by Bustrayakov	Ball	9.750	9.716
2000	Olympics	Sydney	Mr. Mellow / Megalith by T-Square	Hoop	9.750	9.750
2000	Olympics	Sydney	The Saint by Graeme Revell	Rope	9.750	9.725
