= Natalia Sirobaba =

Ukrainian gymnast

- Full name: Natalia Oleksandrivna Sirobaba
- Born: 26 September 1985 (age 40) Cherkasy, Ukrainian SSR, Soviet Union
- Height: 150 cm (4 ft 11 in)

Gymnastics career
- Discipline: Women's artistic gymnastics
- Country represented: Ukraine
- Club: Spartak Cherkasy
- Head coach: Nadia Koriakina
- Assistant coach: Valentyn Shumovskyi
- Choreographer: Inna Korochinksa
Medal record
Women's artistic gymnastics
Representing Ukraine
Summer Universiade
Silver medal – second place	2003 Daegu	Team
Bronze medal – third place	2003 Daegu	All-around
Bronze medal – third place	2003 Daegu	Floor exercise
European Junior Championships
Gold medal – first place	1998 Saint Petersburg	Team
Silver medal – second place	2000 Paris	Vault

Natalia Oleksandrivna Sirobaba (Ukrainian: Наталія Олександрівна Сіробаба; born September 26, 1985) is a Ukrainian former gymnast.

== Early life ==
Natalia Sirobaba was born on September 26, 1985, in Cherkasy to Vira and Oleksandr Sirobaba. She has an older sister Inna. Natalia started with gymnastics when she was 5 years old.

== Career ==
In 1998, at the European Junior Championships in Saint Petersburg Sirobaba won gold medal in team competition. There she was the youngest and smallest member on the Ukrainian girls' team. Natalia also finished 8th in vault at these European Junior Championships.

She competed in different junior meets since and won bars and beam in a tournament in Japan in 1999. In Belgium she has won vault and bars.

In 2000, Sirobaba won a silver medal in vault at the European Junior Championships in Paris.

Sirobana competed at WOGA Classic in the US in the beginning of the year 2001. Later, Natalia won a bronze medal in all-around event at the international competition "Kyiv Major Gymnastics Cup". In November, she competed at the World Championships in Ghent, finishing 6th in team competition.

In March 2002, Sirobaba competed at the Stella Zakharova Gymnastics Cup in Kyiv. Later, she competed at the European Championships in Patras, finishing 4th in team competition.

At the 2003 World Artistic Gymnastics Championships Sirobaba finished 7th in team competition. Later, she won a silver medal in team competition, two bronze medals in all-around and floor exercise at the Summer Universiade in Daegu.
