= Vyacheslav Shyrshov =

Ukrainian swimmer (born 1979)

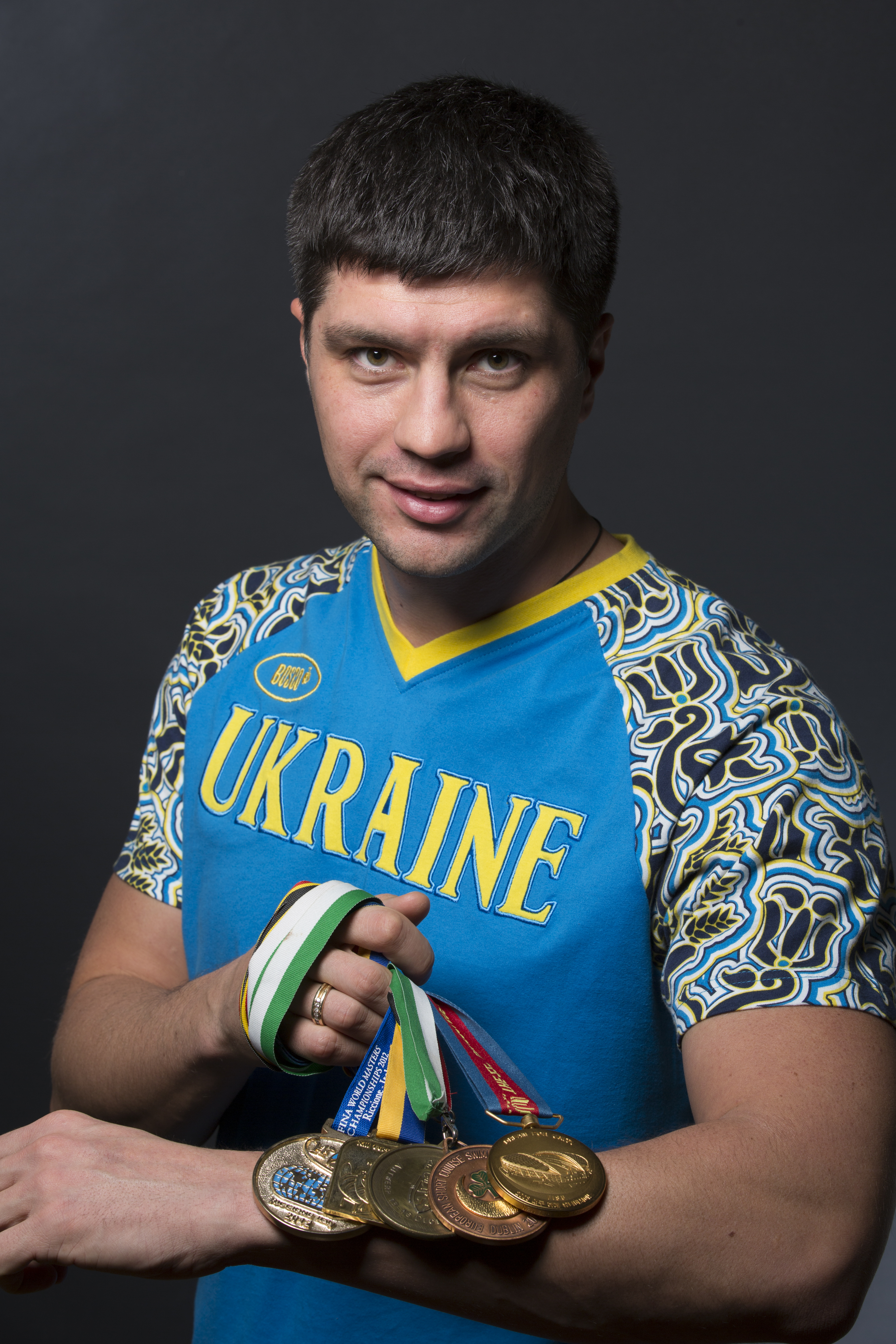
- Vyacheslav Shyrshov is a freestyle swimmer from Ukraine

Personal information
- Full name: В'ячеслав Ширшов
- Nickname: "Slava"
- Nationality: Ukraine
- Born: 9 July 1979 (age 47) Luhansk, Luhansk Oblast, Ukrainian SSR, Soviet Union
- Height: 1.97 m (6 ft 6 in)
- Weight: 90 kg (198 lb)

Sport
- Sport: Swimming
- Strokes: Freestyle
Medal record
Summer Universiade
Gold medal – first place	2003 Daegu	50 m freestyle
Silver medal – second place	2001 Beijing	50 m freestyle
Bronze medal – third place	2001 Beijing	100 m freestyle
European Championships (SC)
Gold medal – first place	2001 Antwerp	4×50 m freestyle
Silver medal – second place	2003 Dublin	50 m backstroke
Silver medal – second place	2004 Vienna	50 m backstroke
Silver medal – second place	2004 Vienna	4×50 m medley
Gold medal – first place	2012 Riccione	50 m backstroke

Vyacheslav ("Slava") Viktorovych Shyrshov (Ukrainian: В'ячеслав Вікторович Ширшов) (born 9 July 1979) is a freestyle swimmer from Ukraine, who won the gold medal in the men's 50 metres freestyle event at the 2003 Summer Universiade in Daegu. He represented his native country at two consecutive Summer Olympics, starting in 2000 in Sydney, Australia.

== Awards and achievements ==
- 2000 Sep | XXVII Olympic Games SYDNEY, Australia
  - 4 × 100 m RELAY MEDLEY MEN — 11th place
- 2001 Jun | The 9th FINA World Swimming Championships FUKUOKA, Japan
  - 50m Backstroke — 8th place
  - 50m Freestyle — 6th place
- 2001 Aug | The 21st Universiade BEIJING, China
  - 50m Freestyle — Silver medalist of the World Universiade
  - 100m Freestyle — Bronze medalist of the World Universiade
  - 4 × 100 m RELAY MEDLEY MEN — Silver medalist of the World Universiade
- 2001 Nov | Grand-Prix ARENA, Italy
  - Silver medalist at major international Grand Prix
- 2001 Dec | European Championships shot course ANTWERP, Belgium
  - 4x50m RELAY FREESTYLE MEN — Winner and NEW European Record
- 2002 Apr | FINA Short Course Championships MOSCOW, Russia
  - 50m Backstroke — 8th place
- 2002 Dec | European Championships shot course RIESA, Germany
  - 4x50m RELAY FREESTYLE MEN — Bronze medalist
  - 4x50m RELAY MEDLEY MEN — Bronze medalist
- 2003 Aug | The 22nd Summer Universiade DAEGU, Republic Of Korea
  - 50m Freestyle — Winner of the World Universiade
  - 50m Backstroke — Bronze medalist of the World Universiade
  - 4 × 100 m RELAY MEDLEY MEN — Bronze medalist of the World Universiade
- 2003 Dec | European Championships shot course DUBLIN, Ireland
  - 50m Backstroke — Silver medalist (Today, it is the best result in Ukraine)
  - 4x50m RELAY MEDLEY MEN — Bronze medalist
- 2004 Aug | XXVIII Olympic Games ATHENS, Greece
  - A member of the Olympic team of Ukraine

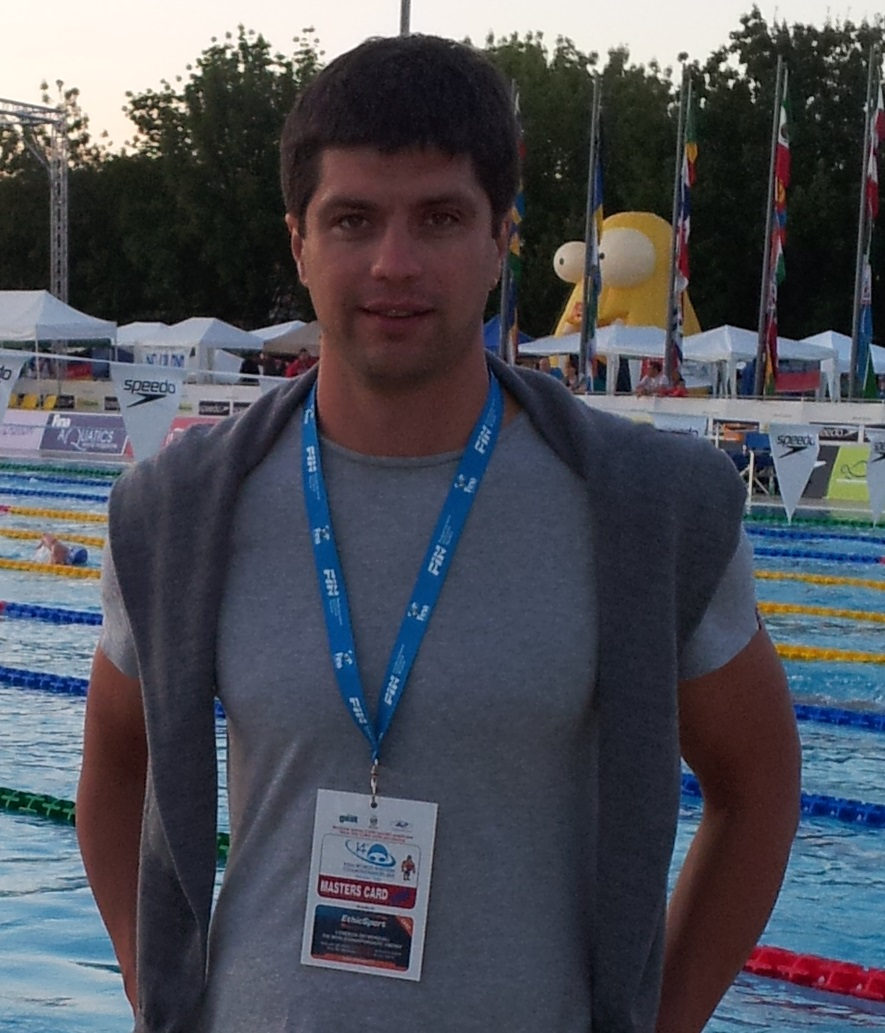
Vyacheslav Shyrshov at the 14th World Masters Championships in Riccione (Italy), Jun 2012

- 2004 Dec | European Championships shot course VIENNA, Austria
  - 50m Backstroke — Silver medalist
  - 4x50m RELAY MEDLEY MEN — Silver medalist
- 2005 Jun | The European Police championships swimming BERLIN, Germany
  - 4 × 100 m RELAY FREESTYLE MEN — Winner
  - 50m Freestyle — Silver medalist
- 2005 Jul | XI th FINA World Swimming Championships MONTREAL, Canada
  - A member of the World Cup
- 2011 Sep | XIII European Masters Championships YALTA, Ukraine
  - 50m Freestyle — Winner
  - 50m Backstroke — Winner
  - 4x50m RELAY MEDLEY MEN — Winner and NEW World Record
  - 4x50m RELAY FREESTYLE MEN — Winner and NEW European Record
  - 4x50m RELAY MEDLEY MIX — Winner
  - 4x50m RELAY FREESTYLE MIX — Winner
- 2012 Jun | 14th World Masters Championships RICCIONE, Italy
  - 50m Freestyle — Winner
  - 50m Backstroke — Winner
  - 4x50m RELAY MEDLEY MEN — Winner and NEW World Record
  - 4x50m RELAY FREESTYLE MEN — Winner and NEW European Record
