= Andriy Serdinov =

Ukrainian swimmer (born 1982)

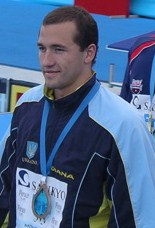
- Andriy Serdinov at the 2005 FINA World Championships in Montréal.

Personal information
- Full name: Андрій Сердінов
- Nationality: Ukraine
- Born: 17 November 1982 (age 43) Luhansk, Ukrainian SSR, Soviet Union
- Height: 6 ft 2 in (188 cm)
- Weight: 198 lb (90 kg)

Sport
- Sport: Swimming
- Strokes: Butterfly
Medal record
Men's swimming
Representing the Ukraine
Event	1st	2nd	3rd
Olympic Games	0	0	1
World Championships (LC)	0	0	2
World Championships (SC)	0	0	1
European Championships (LC)	3	2	2
European Championships (SC)	0	0	2
Summer Universiade	3	2	0
European Junior Championships	3	0	0
Total	9	4	8
Olympic Games
Bronze medal – third place	2004 Athens	100 m butterfly
World Championships (LC)
Bronze medal – third place	2003 Barcelona	100 m butterfly
Bronze medal – third place	2005 Montreal	100 m butterfly
World Championships (SC)
Bronze medal – third place	2006 Shanghai	4×100 m medley
European Championships (LC)
Gold medal – first place	2004 Madrid	100 m butterfly
Gold medal – first place	2004 Madrid	4×100 m medley
Gold medal – first place	2006 Budapest	100 m butterfly
Silver medal – second place	2002 Berlin	100 m butterfly
Silver medal – second place	2006 Budapest	4×100 m medley
Bronze medal – third place	2000 Helsinki	4×100 m medley
Bronze medal – third place	2004 Madrid	50 m butterfly
European Championships (SC)
Bronze medal – third place	2003 Dublin	50 m butterfly
Bronze medal – third place	2003 Dublin	100 m butterfly
Summer Universiade
Gold medal – first place	2003 Daegu	50 m butterfly
Gold medal – first place	2003 Daegu	100 m butterfly
Gold medal – first place	2003 Daegu	4×100 m medley
Silver medal – second place	2001 Beijing	100 m butterfly
Silver medal – second place	2003 Daegu	4×100 m freestyle
European Junior Championships
Gold medal – first place	1999 Moscow	100 m butterfly
Gold medal – first place	2000 Dunkerque	100 m butterfly
Gold medal – first place	2000 Dunkerque	50 m butterfly

Andriy Serdinov (Ukrainian: Андрій Вікторович Сердінов; born 17 November 1982) is a Ukrainian swimmer, who competed in the 2000 Olympics, 2004 Olympics and the 2008 Olympics. Serdinov also won the bronze medal in the 100 m butterfly at the 2004 Summer Olympics.

Serdinov was also the world record holder in this event, which stood for approximately five minutes. He broke Michael Klim's mark during the semifinals of the World Championships in Barcelona, Spain, in 2003, only to have Michael Phelps break it in the next semifinal. It was later again broken by Ian Crocker in the final, the day after.

In 2003 he won two golds at the Summer Universiade, in the 50 m and 100 m butterfly.

Records
Preceded by Michael Klim	World Record Holder; Men's 100 Butterfly; July 25, 2003	Succeeded by Michael Phelps
