= Volodymyr Nikolaychuk =

Ukrainian swimmer

Personal information
- Native name: Володимир Григорович Ніколайчук
- Nationality: Ukraine
- Born: 29 April 1975 (age 51)
- Height: 6 ft 2 in (188 cm)
- Weight: 170 lb (77 kg)

Sport
- Sport: Swimming
- Strokes: Backstroke
Medal record
World Championships (SC)
| Bronze medal – third place | 2000 Athens | 200 m backstroke |
European Championships (LC)
| Gold medal – first place | 2004 Madrid | 4×100 m medley |
| Silver medal – second place | 2000 Helsinki | 100 m backstroke |
| Bronze medal – third place | 2000 Helsinki | 4×100 m medley |
European Championships (SC)
| Bronze medal – third place | 1999 Lisbon | 100 m backstroke |
Summer Universiade
| Gold medal – first place | 2003 Daegu | 4×100 m medley |
| Bronze medal – third place | 2001 Beijing | 100 m backstroke |

Volodymyr Hryhorovych Nikolaychuk (Ukrainian: Володимир Григорович Ніколайчук, born 29 April 1975) is a backstroke swimmer from Ukraine, who represented his native country at three consecutive Summer Olympics, starting in 1996. He won a bronze and a silver medal at the 2000 European Long Course Championships in Helsinki, Finland.
