= Swimming at the 2001 Summer Universiade =

Swimming at the XXI Summer Universiade
- Venues: Ying Tung Natatorium
- Dates: 22 August 2001 – 1 September 2001

The swimming competition at the 2001 Summer Universiade took place in Beijing, People's Republic of China from August 22 to September 1, 2001.

== Men's events ==
Event	Gold	Silver	Bronze
50 m freestyle	Bartosz Kizierowski (POL)	Vyacheslav Shyrshov (UKR)	Tomohiro Yamanoi (JPN)
100 m freestyle	Romain Barnier (FRA)	Bartosz Kizierowski (POL)	Vyacheslav Shyrshov (UKR)
200 m freestyle	Clay Kirkland (USA)	Matteo Pelliciari (ITA)	Dan Ketchum (USA)
400 m freestyle	Igor Snitko (UKR)	Dragoș Coman (ROU)	Shunichi Fujita (JPN)
800 m freestyle	Igor Snitko (UKR)	Shunichi Fujita (JPN)	Brendan Neligan (USA)
1500 m freestyle	Igor Snitko (UKR)	Luca Baldini (ITA)	John Cole (USA)
50 m backstroke	Peter Marshall (USA)		Todd Smolinski (USA)
50 m backstroke	Mariusz Siembida (POL)		Todd Smolinski (USA)
100 m backstroke	Peter Marshall (USA)	Todd Smolinski (USA)	Volodymyr Nikolaychuk (UKR)
200 m backstroke	Bryce Hunt (USA)	Simon Dufour (FRA)	Yu Rui (CHN)
50 m breaststroke	Oleg Lisogor (UKR)	Remo Lütolf (SUI)	Adam Whitehead (GBR)
100 m breaststroke	Oleg Lisogor (UKR)	Ryosuke Imai (JPN)	Richárd Bodor (HUN)
200 m breaststroke	Davide Rummolo (ITA)	Michele Vancini (ITA)	Tony de Pellegrini (FRA)
50 m butterfly	Kohei Kawamoto (JPN)		Igor Marchenko (RUS)
50 m butterfly	Burl Reid (AUS)		Igor Marchenko (RUS)
100 m butterfly	Kohei Kawamoto (JPN)	Andriy Serdinov (UKR)	Igor Marchenko (RUS)
200 m butterfly	Andrew Mahaney (USA)	Jeff Somensatto (USA)	Hisayoshi Tanaka (JPN)
200 m individual medley	Takahiro Mori (JPN)	Kevin Clements (USA)	Peter Mankoč (SLO)
400 m individual medley	Kevin Clements (USA)	Carlos Sayão (CAN)	Tim Siciliano (USA)
4 × 100 m freestyle relay	Great Britain (GBR)	United States (USA)	France (FRA)
4 × 200 m freestyle relay	Italy (ITA)	United States (USA)	France (FRA)
4 × 100 m medley relay	United States (USA)	Ukraine (UKR)	France (FRA)

== Women's events ==
Event	Gold	Silver	Bronze
50 m freestyle	Han Xue (CHN)	Olga Mukomol (UKR)	Suze Valen (NED)
100 m freestyle	Petra Dallmann (GER)	Han Xue (CHN)	Jennifer Crisman (USA)
200 m freestyle	Camelia Potec (ROU)	Nadezhda Chemezova (RUS)	Sarah Tolar (USA)
400 m freestyle	Camelia Potec (ROU)	Rachel Komisarz (USA)	Sachiko Yamada (JPN)
800 m freestyle	Yana Klochkova (UKR)	Jana Pechanová (CZE)	Sachiko Yamada (JPN)
1500 m freestyle	Sachiko Yamada (JPN)	Rachel Komisarz (USA)	Jana Pechanová (CZE)
50 m backstroke	Ilona Hlaváčková (CZE)	Mai Nakamura (JPN)	Susan Woessner (USA)
100 m backstroke	Mai Nakamura (JPN)	Susan Woessner (USA)	Ilona Hlaváčková (CZE)
200 m backstroke	Reiko Nakamura (JPN)	Tomoko Hagiwara (JPN)	Roxana Maracineanu (FRA)
50 m breaststroke	Tara Kirk (USA)	Kristen Woodring (USA)	Yelena Bogomazova (RUS)
100 m breaststroke	Xu Shan (CHN)	Zhang Yi (CHN)	Yuko Sakaguchi (JPN)
200 m breaststroke	Yuko Sakaguchi (JPN)	Anne Poleska (GER)	Zhang Yi (CHN)
50 m butterfly	Bethany Goodwin (USA)	Rachel Komisarz (USA)	Zheng Xi (CHN)
100 m butterfly	Irina Bespalova (RUS)	Natalya Sutyagina (RUS)	Rachel Komisarz (USA)
200 m butterfly	Yuko Nakanishi (JPN)	Yekaterina Vinogradova (RUS)	Margaretha Pedder (GBR)
200 m individual medley	Yana Klochkova (UKR)	Tomoko Hagiwara (JPN)	Liang Shuang (CHN)
400 m individual medley	Federica Biscia (ITA)		Hana Černá (CZE)
400 m individual medley	Liang Shuang (CHN)		Hana Černá (CZE)
4 × 100 m freestyle relay	United States (USA)	Japan (JPN)	China (CHN)
4 × 200 m freestyle relay	United States (USA)	Japan (JPN)	China (CHN)
4 × 100 m medley relay	China (CHN)	United States (USA)	Russia (RUS)

== Medal table ==
Rank	Nation	Gold	Silver	Bronze	Total
1	United States (USA)	11	11	9	31
2	Japan (JPN)	8	7	6	21
3	Ukraine (UKR)	7	4	2	13
4	China (CHN)	4	2	6	12
5	Italy (ITA)	3	3	0	6
6	Poland (POL)	2	1	0	3
6	Romania (ROU)	2	1	0	3
8	Russia (RUS)	1	3	4	8
9	France (FRA)	1	1	5	7
10	Czech Republic (CZE)	1	1	3	5
11	Germany (GER)	1	1	0	2
12	Great Britain (GBR)	1	0	2	3
13	Australia (AUS)	1	0	0	1
14	Canada (CAN)	0	1	0	1
14	Switzerland (SUI)	0	1	0	1
16	Hungary (HUN)	0	0	1	1
16	Netherlands (NED)	0	0	1	1
16	Slovenia (SLO)	0	0	1	1
Totals (18 entries)		43	37	40	120
