= Andriy Mykhailychenko =

Ukrainian gymnast (born 1981)

- Андрій Михайличенко
- Born: 11 August 1981 (age 45) Leningrad, Russian SFSR, Soviet Union
- Height: 1.67 m (5 ft 6 in)

Gymnastics career
- Discipline: Men's artistic gymnastics
- Country represented: Ukraine
- Club: Dynamo Zaporizhzhia
Medal record
Men's artistic gymnastics
Representing Switzerland
World Championships
Bronze medal – third place	2001 Ghent	Team
Summer Universiade
Gold medal – first place	2003 Daegu	Horizontal bar
Silver medal – second place	2003 Daegu	Team
European Junior Championships
Bronze medal – third place	1998 Saint Petersburg	All-around

Andriy Mykhailychenko (Андрій Михайличенко, also transliterated Andrei Mykaylichenko, born 11 August 1981), is a Ukrainian gymnast. He competed at the 2004 Summer Olympics. In 1998, he won the bronze medal in the men's junior all-around event at the 1998 European Men's Artistic Gymnastics Championships held in Saint Petersburg, Russia.
