= Gymnastics at the 2008 Summer Olympics – Men's artistic qualification =

Qualifications for Men's artistic gymnastic competitions at the 2008 Summer Olympics was held at the Beijing National Indoor Stadium on August 9. The results of the qualification determined the qualifiers to the finals: 8 teams in the team final, 24 gymnasts in the all-around final, and 8 gymnasts in each of 6 apparatus finals. The competition was divided to 3 subdivisions. The first subdivision took place at 12:00 China Standard Time (UTC+8); the second and third subdivision took place at 16:00 CST and 20:00 CST respectively.

== Qualification results ==
Team/Gymnast	Nation	Floor (gymnastics)		Pommel horse		Rings (gymnastics)		Vault (gymnastics)		Parallel bars		Horizontal bar		Total (All-around)	
Team/Gymnast	Nation	Score	Rank	Score	Rank	Score	Rank	Score	Rank	Score	Rank	Score	Rank	Score	Rank
China		60.925	6	61.200	1	62.850	1	65.325	1	63.300	2	61.075	3	374.675	1
Yang Wei	China	15.400	=15	15.425	4	16.225	4	16.550	—	15.350	34	14.925	24	93.875	1
Chen Yibing	China	14.725	=42	14.475	27	16.525	1	16.275	—	15.075	46	14.525	43	91.600	9
Li Xiaopeng	China	15.100	28	—	—	14.800	42	16.775	—	16.425	1	15.400	10	78.500	45
Xiao Qin	China	14.375	=56	16.000	1	—	—	15.725	—	15.450	28	15.150	18	76.700	46
Zou Kai	China	15.700	6	—	—	—	—	15.700	—	—	—	15.600	5	47.000	72
Huang Xu	China	—	—	15.300	9	15.300	18	—	—	16.075	7	—	—	46.675	73
Japan		61.675	1	58.625	4	60.500	5	64.125	6	63.150	3	61.475	1	369.550	2
Kōhei Uchimura	Japan	15.725	5	14.100	42	14.675	43	16.200	—	16.025	10	15.325	15	92.050	4
Koki Sakamoto	Japan	14.950		14.925	14	15.525	13	16.200	—	15.625	18	14.725	33	91.950	5
Hiroyuki Tomita	Japan	15.175		15.175	7	15.025	32	15.200	—	15.775	15	15.550	7	91.900	6
Takuya Nakase	Japan	15.500	12	14.075	43	15.275	20	—	—	15.725	16	15.450	8	76.025	48
Takehiro Kashima	Japan	—	—	14.425	33	—	—	15.975	—	15.550	21	15.150	17	61.100	61
Makoto Okiguchi	Japan	15.275	=19	—	—	—	—	15.750	—	—	—	—	—	31.025	86
Russia		60.475	8	57.400	6	60.625	3	64.300	5	63.100	4	60.325	5	366.225	3
Sergei Khorokhordin	Russia	14.975		14.800	18	15.075	31	15.725	—	15.875	13	15.350	13	91.800	7
Maksim Deviatovski	Russia	15.300	18	13.300	63	15.375	15	15.825	—	15.425	29	15.125	19	90.350	14
Yuri Ryazanov	Russia	14.600		14.450	31	15.100	29	15.550	—	15.625	20	14.800	28	90.125	17
Anton Golotsutskov	Russia	15.600	7	12.325	76	15.075	31	16.550; 16.575	6	—	—	14.300	51	73.850	57
Nikolai Kryukov	Russia	—	—	14.850	17	—	—	16.200	—	16.175	2	15.050	20	62.275	60
Konstantin Pluzhnikov	Russia	14.450		—	—	14.275	53	—	—	14.950	49	—	—	43.675	79
South Korea		61.025	4	59.450	2	60.225	6	63.725	11	63.650	1	57.600	10	365.675	4
Kim Dae-eun	South Korea	15.500	13	14.725	21	15.450	14	16.050	—	16.050	8	14.625	37	92.400	3
Kim Soo-myun	South Korea	15.575	9	13.800	54	14.175	56	16.025	—	15.350	33	14.975	22	89.900	18
Yang Tae-young	South Korea	13.850		15.000	13	14.875	38	16.000; 15.525	14	16.100	6	13.475	68	89.300	22
Kim Seung-il	South Korea	14.975		14.550	24	14.325	49	15.650	—	15.325	35	12.175	76	87.000	34
Kim Ji-hoon	South Korea	14.975		15.175	8	—	—	15.650	—	—	—	14.525	44	60.325	62
Yoo Won-chul	South Korea	—	—	—	—	15.575	11	—	—	16.150	4	—	—	31.725	85
Germany		61.100	3	58.900	3	60.000	8	64.375	4	61.500	7	59.800	6	365.675	5
Fabian Hambüchen	Germany	15.800	4	13.100	67	14.975	33	16.300; 16.037	10	16.050	9	16.200	1	92.425	2
Philipp Boy	Germany	14.450		14.675	23	14.650	44	16.200	—	15.125	44	14.375	50	89.475	21
Marcel Nguyen	Germany	15.425	14	—	—	14.850	39	16.225	—	14.875	52	14.450	46	75.825	49
Evgenij Spiridonov	Germany	15.025		14.475	29	—	—	15.650	—	15.450	25	14.400	48	75.000	53
Robert Juckel	Germany	14.850		14.850	16	14.425	46	15.050	—	—	—	14.750	31	73.925	56
Thomas Andergassen	Germany	—	—	14.900	15	15.525	12	—	—	14.675	57	—	—	45.100	75
United States		59.900	9	57.325	7	60.550	4	63.850	8	62.300	5	61.275	2	365.200	6
Jonathan Horton	United States	15.350	17	13.925	48	15.325	17	15.950	—	15.525	22	15.575	6	91.650	8
Alexander Artemev	United States	14.875		15.250	6	13.675	68	15.825	—	15.175	40	14.925	23	89.725	19
Joseph Hagerty	United States	15.275	=19	13.925	49	—	—	15.700	—	15.350	32	15.400	11	75.650	50
Justin Spring	United States	14.400		—	—	14.175	57	15.900	—	15.800	14	15.375	12	75.650	51
Raj Bhavsar	United States	14.175		14.050	45	15.325	16	16.175	—	15.625	19	—	—	75.350	52
Kevin Tan	United States	—	—	14.100	41	15.725	9	—	—	—	—	14.425	47	44.250	76
France		59.025	10	55.825	12	58.975	12	64.650	3	62.175	6	60.550	4	361.200	7
Benoît Caranobe	France	15.125		14.250	37	15.100	28	16.500; 16.437	7	15.275	37	14.675	35	90.925	10
Thomas Bouhail	France	15.125		13.850	50	13.700	66	16.625; 16.662	2	14.675	56	14.575	38	88.550	27
Dimitri Karbanenko	France	14.050		13.700	56	13.675	67	16.125	—	15.500	24	15.450	9	88.500	28
Hamilton Sabot	France	14.575		14.025	46	14.375	48	15.400	—	15.400	30	13.975	59	87.750	30
Danny Pinheiro Rodrigues	France	14.200		13.400	61	15.800	7	—	—	—	—	—	—	43.400	80
Yann Cucherat	France	—	—	—	—	—	—	—	—	16.000	12	15.850	3	31.850	84
Romania		61.175	2	55.900	11	59.850	9	65.325	1	60.050	10	57.050	11	359.350	8
Flavius Koczi	Romania	15.125		14.400	34	13.950	61	16.600; 16.587	5	15.075	47	15.025	21	90.175	16
Ilie Daniel Popescu	Romania	14.575		14.500	26	13.975	59	16.400; 15.262	15	14.525	62	13.325	71	87.300	32
Adrian Bucur	Romania	14.725		12.525	73	14.950	34	15.700	—	14.825	53	13.750	63	86.475	36
Răzvan Șelariu	Romania	15.400	=15	14.075	44	15.175	25	12.900	—	14.950	48	13.475	70	85.975	38
Marian Drăgulescu	Romania	15.925	2	—	—	—	—	16.625; 16.762	1	—	—	14.800	29	47.350	71
Robert Stănescu	Romania	—	—	12.925	70	15.750	8	—	—	15.200	38	—	—	43.875	78
Canada		60.500	7	56.475	10	59.225	10	63.750	9	61.175	9	57.850	9	358.975	9
Nathan Gafuik	Canada	15.225		13.800	54	14.250	54	16.175	—	15.450	26	14.825	27	89.725	20
Adam Wong	Canada	14.900		14.375	35	14.500	45	15.650	—	15.125	43	14.575	41	89.125	24
David Kikuchi	Canada	—	—	14.175	39	15.200	23	15.575	—	15.150	42	14.200	55	74.300	54
Kyle Shewfelt	Canada	15.525	11	—	—	13.925	62	16.350; 16.050	9	—	—	14.250	52	60.050	63
Grant Golding	Canada	14.850		14.125	40	15.275	19	—	—	15.450	27	—	—	59.700	65
Brandon O'Neill	Canada	3.450		12.475	75	—	—	15.150	—	14.900	51	—	—	45.975	74
Belarus		57.875	11	57.575	5	59.125	11	63.750	9	61.200	8	58.425	8	357.950	10
Dzmitry Savitski	Belarus	14.375		14.525	25	15.175	26	16.300	—	15.700	17	14.575	40	90.650	12
Denis Savenkov	Belarus	14.525		13.525	60	13.750	65	15.675	—	14.800	54	14.750	30	87.025	33
Dzmitry Kaspiarovich	Belarus	14.675		—	—	15.275	21	16.500; 16.587	4	15.525	23	14.250	53	76.225	47
Aleksandr Tsarevich	Belarus	14.300		14.450	32	—	—	—	—	15.175	39	14.850	25	58.775	68
Igor Kozlov	Belarus	14.025		12.675	72	14.925	35	15.275	—	—	—	—	—	56.900	70
Aleksei Ignatovich	Belarus	—	—	15.075	12	—	—	—	—	—	—	13.000	75	28.075	92
Spain		61.000	5	56.650	9	60.150	7	63.950	7	59.350	11	56.825	12	357.925	11
Rafael Martínez	Spain	15.550	10	14.800	19	14.325	51	15.750	—	15.100	45	15.275	16	90.800	11
Sergio Muñoz	Spain	14.575		12.700	71	15.150	27	16.100	—	13.675	71	13.300	72	85.500	40
Ivan San Miguel	Spain	—	—	13.775	55	15.200	24	16.050	—	14.375	64	14.525	42	73.925	55
Manuel Carballo	Spain	14.650		14.475	28	14.900	37	—	—	15.275	36	13.025	74	72.325	58
Isaac Botella	Spain	14.975		13.600	59	14.900	36	16.050; 16.075	8	—	—	—	—	59.525	66
Gervasio Deferr	Spain	15.825	3	—	—	—	—	15.075	—	14.600	59	13.725	64	59.225	67
Italy		57.250	12	56.950	8	61.875	2	63.125	12	57.225	12	59.075	7	355.500	12
Enrico Pozzo	Italy	14.800		14.325	36	14.250	55	15.700	—	14.750	55	14.850	26	88.675	26
Matteo Morandi	Italy	14.175		13.700	57	16.025	5	16.100	—	13.725	70	13.850	61	87.575	31
Andrea Coppolino	Italy	14.025		12.925	69	15.975	6	14.825	—	13.675	72	—	—	71.425	59
Matteo Angioletti	Italy	14.250		—	—	15.625	10	16.500; 15.887	12	—	—	13.575	67	59.950	64
Alberto Busnari	Italy	13.525		15.125	11	—	—	—	—	14.625	58	14.375	49	57.650	69
Igor Cassina	Italy			13.800	52	—	—	—	—	14.125	67	16.000	2	43.925	77
Luis Rivera	Puerto Rico	15.125		14.750	20	15.250	22	16.225; 15.712	13	14.575	61	14.675	34	90.600	13
José Luis Fuentes	Venezuela	14.150		15.525	2	14.850	40	15.675	—	15.375	31	14.750	32	90.325	15
Anton Fokin	Uzbekistan	14.325		14.725	22	14.825	41	15.625	—	16.150	3	13.625	65	89.275	23
Daniel Keatings	Great Britain	14.900		15.175	10	13.775	64	15.625	—	14.900	50	14.575	39	88.950	25
Alexander Shatilov	Israel	15.600	8	13.825	51	14.075	58	15.575	—	14.500	63	14.225	54	87.800	29
Claudio Capelli	Switzerland	13.600		14.475	30	14.375	47	15.325	—	14.100	68	14.675	36	86.550	35
Sascha Palgen	Luxembourg	15.200		13.000	68	14.325	52	15.725	—	14.225	65	13.600	66	86.075	37
Sam Simpson	Australia	14.550		14.000	47	13.800	63	15.600	—	14.200	66	13.475	69	85.625	39
Louis Smith	Great Britain	13.700		15.325	5	13.325	69	15.375	—	13.425	73	14.175	56	85.325	41
Jorge Hugo Giraldo	Colombia	14.200		13.350	62	13.950	60	15.150	—	14.025	69	13.975	58	84.650	42
Koen van Damme	Belgium	12.575		14.200	38	14.325	50	14.450	—	14.600	60	14.475	45	84.625	43
Mohamed Srour	Egypt	13.450		13.250	64	12.675	70	15.325	—	12.375	75	14.125	57	81.200	44
Nashwan Al-Harazi	Yemen	13.250		12.525	74	—	—	15.400; 15.250	16	—	—	—	—	41.175	81
Róbert Gál	Hungary	13.425		13.225	65	—	—	—	—	12.900	74	—	—	39.550	82
Diego Hypólito	Brazil	15.950	1	—	—	—	—	16.100	—	—	—	—	—	32.050	83
Filip Ude	Croatia	14.775		15.475	3	—	—	—	—	—	—	—	—	30.250	87
Vlasios Maras	Greece	—	—	—	—	—	—	15.925; 15.987	11	—	—	13.975	60	29.900	88
Valeriy Honcharov	Ukraine	—	—	—	—	—	—	—	—	16.000	11	13.850	62	29.850	89
Ilia Giorgadze	Georgia	14.625		—	—	—	—	—	—	15.150	41	—	—	29.775	90
Christoph Scharer	Switzerland	—	—	13.150	66	—	—	—	—	—	—	15.350	14	28.500	91
Martin Konecny	Czech Republic	—	—	13.650	58	—	—	—	—	—	—	13.125	73	26.775	93
Leszek Blanik	Poland	—	—	—	—	—	—	16.700; 16.587	3	—	—	—	—	16.700	94
Yordan Yovchev	Bulgaria	—	—	—	—	16.275	2	—	—	—	—	—	—	16.275	95
Oleksandr Vorobiov	Ukraine	—	—	—	—	16.250	3	—	—	—	—	—	—	16.250	96
Mitja Petkovšek	Slovenia	—	—	—	—	—	—	—	—	16.125	5	—	—	16.125	97
Epke Zonderland	Netherlands	—	—	—	—	—	—	—	—	—	—	15.750	4	15.750	98

== Overall qualification results ==
=== Team qualification ===
Position	Country	Floor	Pommel Horse	Rings	Vault	Parallel Bars	Horizontal Bar	Team Total
1st	China	60.925	61.200	62.850	65.325	63.300	61.075	374.675
2nd	Japan	61.675	58.625	60.500	64.125	63.150	61.475	369.550
3rd	Russia	60.475	57.400	60.625	64.300	63.100	60.325	366.225
4th	South Korea	61.025	59.450	60.225	63.725	63.650	57.600	365.675
5th	Germany	61.100	58.900	60.000	64.375	61.500	59.800	365.675
6th	United States	59.900	57.325	60.550	63.850	62.300	61.275	365.200
7th	France	59.025	55.825	58.975	64.650	62.175	60.550	361.200
8th	Romania	61.175	55.900	59.850	65.325	60.050	57.050	359.350

=== All Around Qualification ===
Rank	Gymnast	Nation	Floor (gymnastics)	Pommel horse	Rings (gymnastics)	Vault (gymnastics)	Parallel bars	Horizontal bar	Total
1st	Yang Wei	China	15.400	15.425	16.225	16.550	15.350	14.925	93.875
2nd	Fabian Hambuechen	Germany	15.800	13.100	14.975	16.300	16.050	16.200	92.425
3rd	Kim Dae-eun	South Korea	15.500	14.725	15.450	16.050	16.050	14.625	92.400
4th	Kōhei Uchimura	Japan	15.725	14.100	14.675	16.200	16.025	15.325	92.050
5th	Koki Sakamoto	Japan	14.950	14.925	15.525	16.200	15.625	14.725	91.950
6th	Sergey Khorokhordin	Russia	14.975	14.800	15.075	15.725	15.875	15.350	91.800
7th	Jonathan Horton	United States	15.350	13.925	15.325	15.950	15.525	15.575	91.650
8th	Chen Yibing	China	14.725	14.475	16.525	16.275	15.075	14.525	91.600
9th	Benoît Caranobe	France	15.125	14.250	15.100	16.500	15.275	14.675	90.925
10th	Rafael Martínez	Spain	15.550	14.800	14.325	15.750	15.100	15.275	90.800
11th	Dzmitry Savitski	Belarus	14.375	14.525	15.175	16.300	15.700	14.575	90.650
12th	Luis Rivera Rivera	Puerto Rico	15.125	14.750	15.250	16.225	14.575	14.675	90.600
13th	Maxim Devyatovskiy	Russia	15.300	13.300	15.375	15.825	15.425	15.125	90.350
14th	José Luis Fuentes	Venezuela	14.150	15.525	14.850	15.675	15.375	14.750	90.325
15th	Flavius Koczi	Romania	15.125	14.400	13.950	16.600	15.075	15.025	90.175
16th	Kim Soo-Myun	South Korea	15.575	13.800	14.175	16.025	15.350	14.975	89.900
17th	Alexander Artemev	United States	14.875	15.250	13.675	15.825	15.175	14.925	89.725
18th	Nathan Gafuik	Canada	15.225	13.800	14.250	16.175	15.450	14.825	89.725
19th	Philipp Boy	Germany	14.450	14.675	14.650	16.200	15.125	14.375	89.475
20th	Anton Fokin	Uzbekistan	14.325	14.725	14.825	15.625	16.150	13.625	89.275
21st	Adam Wong	Canada	14.900	14.375	14.500	15.650	15.125	14.575	89.125
22nd	Daniel Keatings	Great Britain	14.900	15.175	13.775	15.625	14.900	14.575	88.950
23rd	Enrico Pozzo	Italy	14.800	14.325	14.250	15.700	14.750	14.850	88.675
24th	Thomas Bouhail	France	15.125	13.850	13.700	16.625	14.675	14.575	88.550

Only two gymnasts from each country may advance to the All Around Final. Therefore, in some cases, a third gymnast placed high enough to qualify, but did not advance to the final because of the quota. Gymnasts who did not advance to the Final, but had high enough scores to do so were:

- Hiroyuki Tomita (JPN) (6th place)
- Yury Ryazanov (RUS) (17th place)
- Yang Tae Young (KOR) (22nd place)
- Dimitri Karbanenko (FRA) (Reserve)

==== Reserves ====
The reserves for the All Around Final are

- Alexander Shatilov (ISR) (29th place)
- Matteo Morandi (ITA) (31st place)
- Ilie Daniel Popescu (ROU) (32nd place)
- Denis Savenkov (BLR) (33rd place)

=== Floor Event Final Qualifiers ===
Position	Gymnast	Nation	A Score	B Score	Penalty	Total
1st	Diego Hypólito	Brazil	6.600	9.350		15.950
2nd	Marian Drăgulescu	Romania	6.900	9.025		15.925
3rd	Gervasio Deferr	Spain	6.500	9.325		15.825
4th	Fabian Hambuechen	Germany	6.500	9.300		15.800
5th	Kōhei Uchimura	Japan	6.500	9.225		15.725
6th	Zou Kai	China	6.700	9.100	0.100	15.700
7th	Anton Golotsutskov	Russia	6.500	9.100		15.600
8th	Alexander Shatilov	Israel	6.600	9.000		15.600

==== Reserves ====
The reserves for the Floor event final are

- Kim Soo-myun (KOR) (9th place: 6.700 A, 8.875 B, 15.575 Total)
- Rafael Martínez (ESP) (10th place: 6.400 A, 9.150 B, 15.550 Total)
- Kyle Shewfelt (CAN) (11th place: 6.500 A, 9.025 B, 15.525 Total)

=== Vault Event Final Qualifiers ===
Position	Gymnast	Nation	Vault 1				Vault 2				Total
Position	Gymnast	Nation	A Score	B Score	Penalty	Vault Score	A Score	B Score	Penalty	Vault Score	Total
1	Marian Drăgulescu	Romania	7.000	9.625		16.625	7.200	9.700		16.900	16.762
2	Thomas Bouhail	France	7.000	9.625		16.625	7.000	9.700		16.700	16.662
3	Leszek Blanik	Poland	7.000	9.700		16.700	7.000	9.475		16.475	16.587
4	Dmitry Kasperovich	Belarus	7.000	9.500		16.500	7.000	9.675		16.675	16.587
5	Flavius Koczi	Romania	7.000	9.600		16.600	7.00	9.575		16.575	16.587
6	Anton Golotsutskov	Russia	7.000	9.550		16.550	7.000	9.600		16.600	16.575
7	Benoît Caranobe	France	7.000	9.500		16.500	7.000	9.375		16.375	16.437
8	Isaac Botella	Spain	6.600	9.450		16.050	6.600	9.500		16.100	16.075

==== Reserves ====
The reserves for the vault event final are

- Kyle Shewfelt (CAN) (6.600 A, 9.750 B)
- Fabian Hambuechen (GER) (6.600 A, 9.700 B)
- Vlasios Maras (GRE) (6.600 A, 9.425 B, 0.100 Penalty)

=== Parallel Bars Event Final Qualifiers ===
Position	Gymnast	Nation	A Score	B Score	Penalty	Total
1st	Li Xiaopeng	China	6.900	9.525		16.425
2nd	Nikolay Kryukov	Russia	6.800	9.375		16.175
3rd	Anton Fokin	Uzbekistan	6.800	9.350		16.150
4th	Yoo Won-Chul	South Korea	7.000	9.150		16.150
5th	Mitja Petkovšek	Slovenia	6.600	9.525		16.125
6th	Yang Tae-Young	South Korea	7.000	9.100		16.100
7th	Huang Xu	China	7.000	9.075		16.075
8th	Fabian Hambuechen	Germany	6.900	9.150		16.050

=== Horizontal Bar Event Final Qualifiers ===
Position	Gymnast	Nation	A Score	B Score	Total
1st	Fabian Hambuechen	Germany	7.000	9.200	16.200
2nd	Igor Cassina	Italy	6.800	9.200	16.000
3rd	Yann Cucherat	France	6.900	8.950	15.850
4th	Epke Zonderland	Netherlands	7.100	8.650	15.750
5th	Zou Kai	China	7.000	8.600	15.600
6th	Jonathan Horton	United States	6.400	9.175	15.575
7th	Hiroyuki Tomita	Japan	6.600	8.950	15.550
8th	Takuya Nakase	Japan	6.600	8.850	15.450

=== Rings Event Final Qualifiers ===
Position	Gymnast	Nation	A Score	B Score	Total
1st	Chen Yibing	China	7.300	9.225	16.525
2nd	Yordan Yovchev	Bulgaria	7.300	8.975	16.275
3rd	Oleksandr Vorobiov	Ukraine	7.200	9.050	16.250
4th	Yang Wei	China	7.300	8.925	16.225
5th	Matteo Morandi	Italy	7.100	8.925	16.025
6th	Andrea Coppolino	Italy	6.800	9.175	15.975
7th	Danny Pinheiro Rodrigues	France	7.200	8.600	15.800
8th	Robert Stanescu	Romania	7.000	8.750	15.750

=== Pommel Horse Event Final Qualifiers ===
Position	Gymnast	Nation	A Score	B Score	Total
1st	Xiao Qin	China	6.400	9.600	16.000
2nd	José Luis Fuentes	Venezuela	6.500	9.025	15.525
3rd	Filip Ude	Croatia	6.400	9.075	15.475
4th	Yang Wei	China	6.100	9.325	15.425
5th	Louis Smith	Great Britain	6.500	8.825	15.325
6th	Alexander Artemev	United States	6.100	9.150	15.250
7th	Hiroyuki Tomita	Japan	6.100	9.075	15.175
8th	Kim Ji-Hoon	South Korea	6.100	9.075	15.175

== Subdivision 1 ==
=== Teams ===
Position	Country	Floor	Pommel Horse	Rings	Vault	Parallel Bars	Horizontal Bar	Team Total
1	United States	59.900 (2nd)	57.325 (1st)	60.550 (2nd)	63.850 (2nd)	62.300 (1st)	61.275 (1st)	365.200
2	Spain	61.000 (1st)	56.650 (3rd)	60.150 (3rd)	63.950 (1st)	59.350 (2nd)	56.825 (3rd)	357.925
3	Italy	57.250 (3rd)	56.950 (2nd)	61.875 (1st)	63.125 (3rd)	57.225 (3rd)	59.075 (2nd)	355.500

=== Individuals ===
Position	Gymnast	Nation	Floor	Pommel Horse	Rings	Vault	Parallel Bars	Horizontal Bar	Total
1	Jonathan Horton	United States	15.350	13.925	15.325	15.950	15.525	15.575	91.650
2	Rafael Martínez	Spain	15.550	14.800	14.325	15.750	15.100	15.275	90.800
3	Alexander Artemev	United States	14.875	15.250	13.675	15.825	15.175	14.925	89.725
4	Anton Fokin	Uzbekistan	14.325	14.725	14.825	15.625	16.150	13.625	89.275
5	Daniel Keatings	Great Britain	14.900	15.175	13.775	15.625	14.900	14.575	88.950
6	Enrico Pozzo	Italy	14.800	14.325	14.250	15.700	14.750	14.850	88.675
7	Alexander Shatilov	Israel	15.600	13.825	14.075	15.575	14.500	14.225	87.800
8	Matteo Morandi	Italy	14.175	13.700	16.025	16.100	13.725	13.850	87.575
9	Claudio Capelli	Switzerland	13.600	14.475	14.375	15.325	14.100	14.675	86.550
10	Sergio Muñoz	Spain	14.575	12.700	15.150	16.100	13.675	13.300	85.500
11	Louis Smith	Great Britain	13.700	15.325	13.325	15.375	13.425	14.175	85.325
12	Jorge Hugo Giraldo	Colombia	14.200	13.350	13.950	15.150	14.025	13.975	84.650
13	Mohamed Srour	Egypt	13.450	13.250	12.675	15.325	12.375	14.125	81.200
14	Joseph Hagerty	United States	15.275	13.925	N/A	15.700	15.350	15.400	75.650
15	Justin Spring	United States	14.400	N/A	14.175	15.900	15.800	15.375	75.650
16	Raj Bhavsar	United States	14.175	14.050	15.325	16.175	15.625	N/A	75.350
17	Ivan San Miguel	Spain	N/A	13.775	15.200	16.050	14.375	14.525	73.925
18	Manuel Carballo	Spain	14.650	14.475	14.900	N/A	15.275	13.025	72.325
19	Andrea Coppolino	Italy	14.025	12.925	15.975	14.825	13.675	N/A	71.425
20	Matteo Angioletti	Italy	14.250	N/A	15.625	16.500	N/A	13.575	59.950
21	Isaac Botella	Spain	14.975	13.600	14.900	16.050	N/A	N/A	59.525
22	Gervasio Deferr	Spain	15.825	N/A	N/A	15.075	14.600	13.725	59.225
23	Alberto Busnari	Italy	13.525	15.125	N/A	N/A	14.625	14.375	57.650
24	Kai Wen Tan	United States	N/A	14.100	15.725	N/A	N/A	14.425	44.250
25	Igor Cassina	Italy	N/A	13.800	N/A	0.000	14.125	16.000	43.925
26	Nashwan Al-Harazi	Yemen	13.250	12.525	N/A	15.400	N/A	N/A	41.175
27	Vlasios Maras	Greece	N/A	N/A	N/A	15.925	N/A	13.975	29.900
28	Ilia Giorgadze	Georgia	14.625	N/A	N/A	N/A	15.150	N/A	29.775
29	Christoph Scharer	Switzerland	N/A	13.150	N/A	N/A	N/A	15.350	28.500
30	Leszek Blanik	Poland	N/A	N/A	N/A	16.700	N/A	N/A	16.700
31	Epke Zonderland	Netherlands	N/A	N/A	N/A	N/A	N/A	15.750	15.750

== Subdivision 2 ==
- China
- Mixed team 4
  - Róbert Gál Hungary
  - Filip Ude Croatia
  - Martin Konecny Czech Republic
  - Diego Hypólito Brazil
- Canada
- Russia
- Japan
- France

== Subdivision 3 ==
- Belarus
- Mixed team 5
  - Mitja Petkovšek Slovenia
  - Valery Goncharov Ukraine
  - Alexander Vorobyev Ukraine
  - Koen van Damme Belgium
- South Korea
- Germany
- Mixed team 1
  - Sascha Palgen Luxembourg
  - Yordan Yovchev Bulgaria
  - José Luis Fuentes Venezuela
  - Luis Rivera Rivera Puerto Rico
  - Sam Simpson Australia
- Romania
