= 2009 World Artistic Gymnastics Championships – Men's qualification =

The men's qualifying round for the 2009 World Artistic Gymnastics Championships took place on 13 October 2009. There were 3 subdivisions

== Individual all-around ==
Men	Name	Country	Date of birth	Age
Youngest	Javier Sandoval Afanador	Colombia	12 February 1993	16 years
Oldest	Yordan Yovchev	Bulgaria	24 February 1973	36 years

Rank	Gymnast	Nation	Floor (gymnastics)	Pommel horse	Rings (gymnastics)	Vault (gymnastics)	Parallel bars	Horizontal bar	Total	Qual.
1	Kōhei Uchimura	Japan	15.775	14.750	15.100	15.000	15.050	15.250	90.925	Q
2	Maxim Devyatovskiy	Russia	15.150	14.700	14.225	16.025	14.525	14.725	89.350	Q
3	Timothy McNeill	United States	13.800	15.350	14.825	15.525	15.100	14.175	88.775	Q
4	Daniel Keatings	Great Britain	14.700	14.425	14.250	15.750	14.875	14.400	88.400	Q
5	Jonathan Horton	United States	14.600	12.800	14.700	15.650	14.925	15.325	88.000	Q
6	Mykola Kuksenkov	Ukraine	15.075	13.600	13.975	15.425	14.650	15.025	87.750	Q
7	Alexander Shatilov	Israel	15.475	14.050	13.850	15.525	14.150	14.375	87.425	Q
8	Yury Ryazanov	Russia	13.825	13.550	14.925	15.275	14.375	15.000	86.950	Q
9	Kristian Thomas	Great Britain	14.050	14.050	14.225	16.075	13.850	14.550	86.800	Q
10	Kazuhito Tanaka	Japan	13.075	13.325	14.700	15.425	15.600	14.525	86.650	Q
11	Jeffrey Wammes	Netherlands	15.350	12.525	14.100	15.900	14.075	14.350	86.300	Q
12	Luis Rivera	Puerto Rico	14.225	14.100	14.600	15.550	13.450	14.125	86.050	Q
13	Enrico Pozzo	Italy	14.825	14.600	13.150	14.475	14.150	14.725	85.925	Q
14	Manuel Almeida Campos	Portugal	14.550	13.050	13.975	15.200	14.650	14.175	85.600	Q
15	Roman Gisi	Switzerland	14.075	13.550	14.200	15.525	14.175	13.950	85.475	Q
16	Luis Vargas Velazquez	Puerto Rico	14.475	14.225	13.350	14.900	14.175	13.950	85.075	Q
17	Jorge Giraldo López	Colombia	13.550	13.650	13.725	15.050	15.100	13.925	85.000	Q
18	Didier Yamit Lugo Sichaca	Colombia	13.375	13.550	14.200	15.300	14.325	14.225	84.975	Q
19	Marcel Nguyen	Germany	15.250	12.950	14.125	14.550	14.275	13.750	84.900	Q
20	Benoît Caranobe	France	14.600	14.050	14.125	14.575	13.575	13.625	84.550	Q
21	Sergio Muñoz	Spain	14.650	13.250	13.925	15.800	12.875	13.975	84.475	Q
22	Nicolas Boeschenstein	Switzerland	14.825	10.650	14.100	16.125	14.425	14.300	84.425	Q
23	Federico Molinari	Argentina	13.875	13.075	13.950	15.400	14.050	13.250	83.600	Q
24	Sergio Sasaki Jr.	Brazil	13.975	13.700	13.775	14.875	14.175	12.625	83.125	Q
25	Artsiom Bykau	Belarus	13.100	14.225	14.075	15.000	13.475	13.250	83.125	R
26	Ildar Valeiev	Kazakhstan	14.500	13.875	12.325	14.500	13.925	13.875	83.000	R
27	Bart Deurloo	Netherlands	14.200	12.700	12.975	15.350	13.725	14.050	83.000	R
28	Fernando Fuentes Petro	Venezuela	13.675	13.525	13.425	14.900	14.075	13.250	82.850	R
29	Gustavo Palma Simoes (POR)		13.425	13.275	14.35	15.025	13.625	12.85	82.55	
30	Dimitrios Markousis (GRE)		14	12.05	14	14.325	14.275	13.7	82.35	
31	Samuel Offord (AUS)		13.575	11.95	14.4	15.55	13.025	13.75	82.25	
32	Vahagn Stepanyan (ARM)		14.025	13.7	13.925	13.075	14.275	13.1	82.1	
33	Vid Hidvégi (HUN)		13.575	14.925	13.35	12.775	13.475	13.5	81.6	
34	Daniel Corral Barron (MEX)		12.775	13.65	14.175	15.9	13.225	11.825	81.55	
35	Fabian Leimlehner (AUT)		13.3	12.875	13.925	14.45	13.625	13.35	81.525	
36	Pavel Bulauski (BLR)		13.25	13.25	13.875	14.475	13.525	12.925	81.3	
37	Sami Aalto (FIN)		13.45	12.975	13.825	15.225	13.05	12.325	80.85	
38	Helge Vammen (DEN)		13.825	12.25	12.525	15.475	13.375	13.275	80.725	
39	Marko Brez (CRO)		12.2	13.475	13.1	14.7	13.225	13.825	80.525	
40	Bjorn Slanvall (SWE)		14	12.625	12.975	14.525	13.575	12.5	80.2	
41	Jeremy Bourgois (BEL)		14.05	13.5	13.25	14.3	13.025	11.75	79.875	
42	Marcell Hetrovics (HUN)		13.3	11.375	13.25	14.425	13.725	13.725	79.8	
43	Patrikas Prusinskas (LTU)		12.95	12.825	12.5	15.025	13.25	13.075	79.625	
44	Jackson Payne (CAN)		13.475	10.575	12.675	14.025	13.925	14.675	79.35	
45	George Foo (SWE)		12.65	13.25	13.025	14.325	13.6	12.375	79.225	
46	Jevgenij Izmodenov (LTU)		13.75	12.825	12.35	14.025	12.8	13.4	79.15	
47	Shakir Shikhaliyev (AZE)		13.2	11.925	13.1	15.475	13.075	12.275	79.05	
48	Wai-Hung Shek (HKG)		13.75	12.025	12.15	15.95	12.325	12.675	78.875	
49	Luke Carson (IRL)		12.925	12.275	12.525	14.4	13.225	13.175	78.525	
50	Robert Kristmannsson (ISL)		13.525	11.475	12.6	14.95	12.725	13.05	78.325	
51	Chol Jin Ri (PRK)		11.275	13.75	12.725	13.8	14.225	12.425	78.2	
52	Luis Filipe De Araujo (POR)		13.8	12.075	12.975	14.175	13.375	11.1	77.5	
53	Joachim Hancheolsen (NOR)		13.975	10.35	12.675	14.925	13.4	11.525	76.85	
54	Rohan Sebastian (IRL)		12.6	12.45	12.425	13.825	12.525	12.975	76.8	
55	Patrick Peng (NZL)		13.475	10.1	13.55	13.875	13.275	12.475	76.75	
56	Mans Stenberg (SWE)		14.5	10.6	13.475	14.425	11.45	12.225	76.675	
57	Matthias Decker (AUT)		12.5	11.25	12.55	14.375	12.9	13	76.575	
58	Vitalijs Kardashovs (LAT)		13.15	10.95	12.3	15.15	11.075	13.3	75.925	
59	Mikhail Koudinov (NZL)		12.675	12.325	13.175	13.85	10.75	12.725	75.5	
60	Alexander Windfeld-Hellsten (DEN)		12.175	12.275	12.4	14.2	12.25	12.2	75.5	
61	Viktor Kristmannsson (ISL)		11.85	12.475	11.75	14.525	12.375	12.325	75.3	
62	Partha Mondal (IND)		12.85	12.8	11.9	14.3	12.65	10.75	75.25	
63	Ravshanbek Osimov (UZB)		12.8	12.175	11.5	14.325	11.675	12.625	75.1	
64	Hellal Metidji (ALG)		12.775	12.25	11.25	14.15	11.475	12.75	74.65	
65	Ashish Kumar (IND)		13.75	11.975	11.25	14.125	12.675	10.75	74.525	
66	Mahmood Alsadi (QAT)		13.025	12.325	12.6	14.175	13.325	8.85	74.3	
67	Ali Al Asi (JOR)		13.35	8.8	14.925	14.7	11.725	10.65	74.15	
68	Tyrone Morris (RSA)		12.35	12.725	10.375	11.675	13.375	12.325	72.825	
69	Milos Paunovic (SRB)		11.675	9.775	12.85	14.5	12.675	10.9	72.375	
70	Kyong-Hak Kim (PRK)		13.1	14.5		15.525	14.1	15	72.225	
71	Christo Malan (RSA)		13.075	11.075	10.775	14.1	11.7	10.275	71	
72	Jad Mazahreh (JOR)		14.2	7.65	9.175	15.275	12.975	11.625	70.9	
73	Kiu-Chung Ng (HKG)		12.45	7.25	12.075	13.725	11.2	9.85	66.55	
74	Gilles Gentges (BEL)		12.75	12.8	13.125	0	13.625	13.45	65.75	
75	Javier Sandoval Afanador (COL)		11.6	12.575		14.475	12.25	12.45	63.35	
76	Oscar Anibal Canas Figueroa (ESA)		0	13.2	11.05	12.55	11	11.35	59.15	
77	Mohammad Ali (KUW)		11.7	11.05		12.55	11.55	10.2	57.05	
78	Luis Sosa Abarca (MEX)			13.825	12.975	15.075		12.575	54.45	
79	Mohamed Mohamed Hany (EGY)		13.175	11.775	13.3			13.65	51.9	
80	Bader Alrashed (KUW)		10.075		11.075	13.425	10.275	5.25	50.1	
81	Jawad Alherz (KUW)		12	11.4	10.625	13.625			47.65	
82	Marian Drăgulescu (ROU)		15.725			16.5		14.75	46.975	
83	Flavius Koczi (ROU)		14.425	15.625		16.275			46.325	
84	Angel Ramos Rivera (PUR)				11.575	14.125	8.1	11.55	45.35	
85	Aliaksandr Tsarevich (BLR)			14.875			15.025	15.1	45	
86	Se Gwang Ri (PRK)		12.675		15.075	16.8			44.55	
87	Abdel Rahman Sobhy Ahmed Sobhy (EGY)		14.1			15.6	13.475		43.175	
88	Nathan Gafuik (CAN)		14.075			16.075		12.85	43	
89	Victor Rosa (BRA)		14.95				13.75	14.25	42.95	
90	Ivan San Miguel (ESP)				14.925	15.475		11.75	42.15	
91	Oleksandr Yakubovs'Kyi (UKR)		13.85			14.575	13.725		42.15	
92	Peter Marjan (HUN)		14.175		12.625	15.1			41.9	
93	Vitaliy Nakonechnyy (UKR)			14			14.1	13.525	41.625	
94	Claudio Capelli (SUI)			12.85			14.9	13.8	41.55	
95	Miguel Monreal Hernandez (MEX)			14.5	14.325		12.45		41.275	
96	Osvaldo Martínez Erazun (ARG)				13.475	14.475	13.225		41.175	
97	Juan Manuel Lompizano (ARG)		13.375	12.525		15.025			40.925	
98	Yernar Yerimbetov (KAZ)					13.35	14.375	12.875	40.6	
99	Phạm Phước Hưng (VIE)		13.25	12.2			15.125		40.575	
100	Sascha Palgen (LUX)		13.375	13.275	13.75				40.4	
101	Marius Wirum Haaverstad (NOR)				12.35	15.425		12.55	40.325	
102	Mao Hua Chiu (TPE)			12.25		15.325	12.6		40.175	
103	Javier Gómez Fuertes (ESP)			11.65	13.65		14.575		39.875	
104	Aleksandar Batinkov (BUL)		14.825				12.325	12.6	39.75	
105	Mohamed Sherif El Saharty (EGY)		13.6	12.925				12.575	39.1	
106	Soo-Myun Kim (KOR)		13.225	13				12.875	39.1	
107	Alexander Leidlmair (AUT)		13.5	11.7	12.6				37.8	
108	Lars Jorgen Fjeld (NOR)		11.6		12.9			13.25	37.75	
109	Caio Americo Costa (BRA)			11.025	13.45		13.2		37.675	
110	Martin Konečný (CZE)		14.05	13.325				10.1	37.475	
111	Nasser Alhamad (QAT)		12.725	10.625		13.775			37.125	
112	Olafur Gardar Gunnarsson (ISL)				12.2		11.55	13.325	37.075	
113	Aleksandar Markov (BUL)			12.65			10.075	13.95	36.675	
114	Tamer Ahmed Ragab (EGY)			13.1			9.575	12.15	34.825	
115	Georgios Spanos (CYP)				9.8	13.9	10.35		34.05	
116	González Sepúlveda (CHI)		15.575			16.25			31.825	
117	Matthias Fahrig (GER)		15.525			16.05			31.575	
118	Kai Zou (CHN)		15.675					15.6	31.275	
119	Anton Golotsutskov (RUS)		14.4			16.5			30.9	
120	Marius Daniel Berbecar (ROU)					16.075	14.675		30.75	
121	Isaac Botella Pérez (ESP)		14.55			16.15			30.7	
122	Epke Zonderland (NED)						15.175	15.3	30.475	
123	Prashanth Sellathurai (25x17px)		AUS	15.575	14.825				30.4	
124	Yann Cucherat (FRA)						15.375	14.975	30.35	
125	Danell Leyva (USA)						14.825	15.45	30.275	
126	Won Chul Yoo (KOR)				14.975		15.3		30.275	
127	Rafael Martinez (ESP)		15.375					14.8	30.175	
128	Fahad Al Ghannam (KUW)			0.8	9.05		8.2	11.925	29.975	
129	Cosmin Popescu (ROU)			15.075			14.9		29.975	
130	Jin-Hyok Kim (PRK)				15.025		14.15		29.175	
131	Brandon O'Neill (CAN)		14.3				14.825		29.125	
132	Seungil Kim (KOR)		14.55				14.475		29.025	
133	Rok Klavora (SLO)		14.3			14.6			28.9	
134	Daniel Purvis (GBR)		15.075		13.675				28.75	
135	Wesley Haagensen (USA)			13.875	14.875				28.75	
136	Joshua Jefferis (AUS)				14.775		13.975		28.75	
137	Sebastian Krimmer (GER)			14.125			14.6		28.725	
138	Alexander Rodríguez (PUR)		14.075	14.5					28.575	
139	Herre Zonderland (NED)		13.8			14.75			28.55	
140	Roman Kulesza (POL)						14.5	13.825	28.325	
141	Samuel Simpson (AUS)		14.3	13.85					28.15	
142	Hau Trung Linh (VIE)		12.8			15.25			28.05	
143	Stepan Gorbachev (KAZ)		14.825					13.125	27.95	
144	Yevgen Gryshchenko (GBR)						14.475	13.425	27.9	
145	Tomi Tuuha (FIN)		13.6			14.25			27.85	
146	Michail Doulkeridis (GRE)		13.5					13.625	27.125	
147	Mosiah Brentano Rodrigues (BRA)			14.425				12.55	26.975	
148	Mohamed Sayed Srour (EGY)				12.2	14.725			26.925	
149	Steffen Kristensen (NOR)					14.65	12.225		26.875	
150	Anthony Van Assche (NED)			12.975	13.9				26.875	
151	Takuya Nakase (JPN)						12.725	14.125	26.85	
152	Adam Kierzkowski (POL)						15.375	11.375	26.75	
153	Timo Niemelae (FIN)					14.5		12.25	26.75	
154	Manuel Carballo (ESP)			13.5			13.225		26.725	
155	Markku Leinonen (FIN)				13.975		12.55		26.525	
156	Juan Sebastian Melchiori (ARG)		14					12.25	26.25	
157	Vladislav Esaulov (LTU)				12.05	14.125			26.175	
158	Zoltán Kállai (HUN)						13.3	12.8	26.1	
159	Kevin Lytwyn (CAN)						14.35	11.5	25.85	
160	Chih-Yu Chen (TPE)		12.875		12.875				25.75	
161	Marcus Conradi (NOR)		13.525	12.125					25.65	
162	Nicolás Córdoba (ARG)						11.95	13.525	25.475	
163	Mario Gorosito (ARG)			13.325	11.975				25.3	
164	Changju Ha (KOR)			12.5	12.75				25.25	
165	Wei-Ming Lin (TPE)			12.375			12.65		25.025	
166	Shinoj Muliyil (IND)			11.925				12.975	24.9	
167	Bjarki Asgeirsson (ISL)		12.575	11.9					24.475	
168	Julius Burinskas (LTU)						11.85	12.425	24.275	
169	Alon Hasa (ALB)		12.45	11.775					24.225	
170	Tadas Butautas (LTU)		12.175	11.975					24.15	
171	Paata Nozadze (GEO)		12.025		12.025				24.05	
172	Erik Sletten Gulbrandsen (NOR)			10.8			12.975		23.775	
173	Aditya Rana (IND)				11.2		11.65		22.85	
174	Thomas Bouhail (FRA)					16.325			16.325	
175	Hongtao Zhang (CHN)			16.275					16.275	
176	Krisztián Berki (HUN)			16.1					16.1	
177	Dzmitry Kaspiarovich (BLR)					16.1			16.1	
178	Jevgēņijs Saproņenko (LAT)					16			16	
179	Zhe Feng (CHN)						15.95		15.95	
180	Louis Smith (GBR)			15.9					15.9	
181	Mingyong Yan (CHN)				15.9				15.9	
182	Matteo Angioletti (ITA)					15.9			15.9	
183	Jacob Dalton (USA)					15.875			15.875	
184	Guanyin Wang (CHN)						15.8		15.8	
185	Marek Lyszczarz (POL)					15.625			15.625	
186	Danny Pinheiro-Rodrigues (FRA)				15.625				15.625	
187	Yordan Yovchev (BUL)				15.6				15.6	
188	Eiichi Sekiguchi (JPN)					15.55			15.55	
189	Oleksandr Vorobiov (UKR)				15.55				15.55	
190	Igor Cassina (ITA)							15.5	15.5	
191	Steven Legendre (USA)		15.475						15.475	
192	Aljaž Pegan (SLO)							15.475	15.475	
193	Cyril Tommasone (FRA)			15.45					15.45	
194	Matteo Morandi (ITA)				15.45				15.45	
195	George Robert Stănescu (ROU)				15.45				15.45	
196	Makoto Okiguchi (JPN)		15.425						15.425	
197	Diego Hypólito (BRA)		15.4						15.4	
198	Vasileios Tsolakidis (GRE)						15.375		15.375	
199	Robert Seligman (CRO)			15.35					15.35	
200	Samir Aït Saïd (FRA)				15.35				15.35	
201	Arthur Nabarrete Zanetti (BRA)				15.25				15.25	
202	Regulo Carmona (VEN)				15.25				15.25	
203	Theo Seager (GBR)					15.225			15.225	
204	Timur Kurbanbayev (KAZ)				15.15				15.15	
205	Yibing Chen (CHN)				15.125				15.125	
206	Eleftherios Petrounias (GRE)				15.075				15.075	
207	Claude Alain Porchet (SUI)		14.925						14.925	
208	Sakari Vekki (FIN)		14.85						14.85	
209	Sašo Bertoncelj (SLO)			14.85					14.85	
210	Marijo Možnik (CRO)							14.675	14.675	
211	Maxim Petrishko (KAZ)			14.625					14.625	
212	Aleksandr Balandin (RUS)				14.525				14.525	
213	Ilie Daniel Popescu (ROU)			14.5					14.5	
214	Stanislav Valeiev (KAZ)					14.35			14.35	
215	Andrea Coppolino (ITA)				14.35				14.35	
216	Harutyum Merdinyan (ARM)			14.3					14.3	
217	Mayank Srivastava (IND)					14.3			14.3	
218	Mitja Petkovšek (SLO)						14.225		14.225	
219	Philippe Rizzo (AUS)							14.15	14.15	
220	Stefan Mortensen (DEN)					14.1			14.1	
221	Philipp Boy (GER)							14.1	14.1	
222	Sang-Woo Kim (KOR)					14.075			14.075	
223	Koki Sakamoto (JPN)			14.05					14.05	
224	Santiago Lopez Viana (MEX)		14.025			0			14.025	
225	Joao Fuglsig (DEN)		14.025						14.025	
226	Anatoly Vasilyev (RUS)							14	14	
227	Jihoon Kim (KOR)					0		13.95	13.95	
228	Thomas Taranu (GER)				13.9				13.9	
229	Tomislav Markovic (CRO)		13.8						13.8	
230	Hsien Huang (TPE)		13.75						13.75	
231	Eduard Gholub (ISR)				13.5				13.5	
232	Joaquin Ramirez Ramirez (MEX)		13.475						13.475	
233	Alberto Busnari (ITA)			13.475					13.475	
234	Ziga Britovsek (SLO)			13.25					13.25	
235	Eleftherios Kosmidis (GRE)		13.2						13.2	
236	Vlasios Maras (GRE)							13.125	13.125	
237	Marco Baldauf (AUT)							12.925	12.925	
238	Gregor Saksida (SLO)				12.675				12.675	
239	Devesh Kumar (IND)		12.15						12.15	
240	Mohamed Amir Hacib (ALG)			12.075					12.075	
241	Fatah Aitsaada (ALG)				11.625				11.625	
242	Juho Kanerva (FIN)			11.55					11.55	
243	Andrey Perevoznikov (RUS)			11.45					11.45	

== Floor exercise ==
Rank	Gymnast	Nation	D Score	E Score	Pen.	Total	Qual.
1	Kōhei Uchimura	Japan	6.500	9.275		15.775	Q
2	Marian Drăgulescu	Romania	6.600	9.125		15.725	Q
3	Zou Kai	China	6.700	8.975		15.675	Q
4	Tomás González	Chile	6.600	8.975		15.575	Q
5	Matthias Fahrig	Germany	6.600	8.925		15.525	Q
6	Alexander Shatilov	Israel	6.500	8.975		15.475	Q
7	Steven Legendre	United States	6.500	8.975		15.475	Q
8	Makoto Okiguchi	Japan	6.700	8.725		15.425	Q
9	Diego Hypólito	Brazil	6.500	8.900		15.400	R
10	Rafael Martínez	Spain	6.400	8.975		15.375	R
11	Jeffrey Wammes	Netherlands	6.400	8.950		15.350	R

== Pommel horse ==
Rank	Gymnast	Nation	D Score	E Score	Pen.	Total	Qual.
1	Zhang Hongtao	China	6.600	9.675		16.275	Q
2	Krisztián Berki	Hungary	6.700	9.400		16.100	Q
3	Louis Smith	Great Britain	6.700	9.200		15.900	Q
4	Flavius Koczi	Romania	6.600	9.025		15.625	Q
5	Prashanth Sellathurai	Australia	6.600	8.975		15.575	Q
6	Cyril Tommasone	France	6.400	9.050		15.450	Q
7	Robert Seligman	Croatia	6.300	9.050		15.350	Q
8	Timothy McNeill	United States	6.400	8.950		15.350	Q
9	Cosmin Popescu	Romania	6.400	8.675		15.075	R
10	Vid Hidvégi	Hungary	6.200	8.725		14.925	R
11	Aliaksandr Tsarevich	Belarus	6.000	8.875		14.875	R

== Rings ==
Rank	Gymnast	Nation	D Score	E Score	Pen.	Total	Qual.
1	Yan Mingyong	China	6.800	9.100		15.900	Q
2	Danny Pinheiro-Rodrigues	France	6.800	8.825		15.625	Q
3	Yordan Yovchev	Bulgaria	6.700	8.900		15.600	Q
4	Oleksandr Vorobiov	Ukraine	6.800	8.750		15.550	Q
5	Matteo Morandi	Italy	6.700	8.750		15.450	Q
6	Robert Stănescu	Romania	6.800	8.650		15.450	Q
7	Samir Aït Saïd	France	6.700	8.650		15.350	Q
8	Arthur Zanetti	Brazil	6.500	8.750		15.250	Q
9	Regulo Carmona	Venezuela	6.700	8.550		15.250	R
10	Timur Kurbanbayev	Kazakhstan	6.800	8.350		15.150	R
11	Chen Yibing	China	6.500	8.625		15.125	R

== Vault ==
Rank	Gymnast	Nation	D Score	E Score	Pen.	Score 1	D Score	E Score	Pen.	Score 2	Total	Qual.
Rank	Gymnast	Nation	Vault 1				Vault 2				Total	Qual.
1	Anton Golotsutskov	Russia	7.000	9.500		16.500	7.000	9.325		16.325	16.412	Q
2	Marian Drăgulescu	Romania	7.000	9.500		16.500	7.200	9.025		16.225	16.362	Q
3	Flavius Koczi	Romania	7.000	9.275		16.275	7.000	9.400		16.400	16.337	Q
4	Thomas Bouhail	France	7.000	9.425	0.1	16.325	7.000	9.300		16.300	16.312	Q
5	Ri Se-gwang	North Korea	7.200	9.600		16.800	7.000	8.725		15.725	16.262	Q
6	Isaac Botella	Spain	6.600	9.550		16.150	6.600	9.475		16.075	16.112	Q
7	Matthias Fahrig	Germany	7.000	9.050		16.050	6.600	9.375		15.975	16.012	Q
8	Jeffrey Wammes	Netherlands	6.600	9.300		15.900	6.600	9.475		16.075	15.987	Q
9	Dzmitry Kaspiarovich	Belarus	7.000	9.100		16.100	6.600	9.050		15.650	15.875	R
10	Jevgēņijs Saproņenko	Latvia	7.000	9.100	0.1	16.000	6.600	9.000		15.600	15.800	R
11	Shek Wai-hung	Hong Kong	6.600	9.350		15.950	6.200	9.325		15.525	15.737	R

== Parallel bars ==
Rank	Gymnast	Nation	D Score	E Score	Pen.	Total	Qual.
1	Feng Zhe	China	6.900	9.050		15.950	Q
2	Wang Guanyin	China	6.800	9.000		15.800	Q
3	Kazuhito Tanaka	Japan	6.400	9.200		15.600	Q
4	Adam Kierzowski	Poland	6.300	9.075		15.375	Q
5	Vasileios Tsolakidis	Greece	6.300	9.075		15.375	Q
6	Yann Cucherat	France	6.400	8.975		15.375	Q
7	Yoo Won-chul	South Korea	6.600	8.700		15.300	Q
8	Epke Zonderland	Netherlands	6.100	9.075		15.175	Q
9	Phạm Phước Hưng	Vietnam	6.500	8.625		15.125	R
10	Jorge Giraldo López	Colombia	6.000	9.100		15.100	R
11	Timothy McNeill	United States	6.100	9.000		15.100	R

== Horizontal bar ==
Rank	Gymnast	Nation	D Score	E Score	Pen.	Total	Qual.
1	Zou Kai	China	7.200	8.400		15.600	Q
2	Igor Cassina	Italy	6.700	8.800		15.500	Q
3	Aljaž Pegan	Slovenia	6.800	8.675		15.475	Q
4	Danell Leyva	United States	6.800	8.650		15.450	Q
5	Jonathan Horton	United States	6.700	8.625		15.325	Q
6	Epke Zonderland	Netherlands	7.100	8.200		15.300	Q
7	Kōhei Uchimura	Japan	6.400	8.850		15.250	Q
8	Aliaksandr Tsarevich	Belarus	6.600	8.500		15.100	Q
9	Mykola Kuksenkov	Ukraine	6.300	8.725		15.025	R
10	Yury Ryazanov	Russia	6.600	8.400		15.000	R
11	Kim Kyong-hak	North Korea	6.700	8.300		15.000	R
