= Andreu Vivó =

Spanish artistic gymnast (1978–2012)

- Full name: Andreu Vivó Tomás
- Born: 3 February 1978 Manresa, Spain
- Died: 31 December 2012 (aged 34) San Juan de Torruella, Spain
- Height: 165 cm (5 ft 5 in)

Gymnastics career
- Discipline: Men's artistic gymnastics
- Country represented: Spain (1997–2005 (?))
- Club: Claret
Medal record
Representing Spain
Mediterranean Games
Gold medal – first place	2005 Almería	Team
Silver medal – second place	1997 Bari	Team
Silver medal – second place	2001 Tunis	Parallel bars
Silver medal – second place	2001 Tunis	Horizontal bar
Bronze medal – third place	2001 Tunis	Team

Andreu Vivó Tomás (3 February 1978 – 30 December 2012) was a Spanish male artistic gymnast, representing his nation at international competitions. He participated at the 2000 Summer Olympics. He also competed at the 2002, 2003 and 2005 World Artistic Gymnastics Championships. He won the gold medal in the team all-around event at the 2005 Mediterranean Games together with Víctor Cano, Manuel Carballo, Rafael Martínez and Iván San Miguel.

Vivo died of a heart attack when he was mountain climbing in the morning on 31 December 2012 in San Juan de Torruella. He began to feel ill after climbing the Collbaix peak in the Catalan district with a friend and collapsed soon after beginning the descent. When emergency management personnel arrived they were unable to revive him. His funeral was in Manresa, his hometown, at the Church of Christ the King.
