= Gymnastics at the 2005 Mediterranean Games =

Gymnastics events were competed at the 2005 Mediterranean Games in two disciplines: artistic gymnastics and rhythmic gymnastics.

== Medal summary ==
=== Men's artistic gymnastics ===
Event	Gold		Silver		Bronze	
Teams all-around	Spain; Víctor Cano; Manuel Carballo; Rafael Martínez; Iván San Miguel; Andreu Vivó	165.725	Italy; Matteo Angioletti; Alberto Busnari; Andrea Coppolino; Matteo Morandi; Enrico Pozzo	160.050	France; Gaetan Dupont; Damien Millot; Thomas Bouhail; Danny Rodriguez; Arnaud Willig	159.725
Individual all-around	ESP Rafael Martínez	54.975	FRA Arnaud Willig	53.650	ESP Manuel Carballo	53.050
Floor	ESP Rafael Martínez	9.312	TUN Wajdi Bouallègue	9.075	ITA Enrico Pozzo	8.962
Pommel Horse	ESP Víctor Cano	9.500	ALG Sid Ali Ferdjani	9.375	ITA Alberto Busnari	8.837
Rings	ITA Matteo Morandi	9.712	ITA Andrea Coppolino; CYP Irodotos Georgallas	9.562	None awarded	
Vault	TUN Wajdi Bouallègue	9.412	ITA Matteo Angioletti; ESP Iván San Miguel	9.356	None awarded	
Parallel Bars	SLO Mitja Petkovšek	9.650	ESP Manuel Carballo	9.525	ESP Rafael Martínez	9.350
Horizontal bar	ESP Rafael Martínez	9.612	FRA Arnaud Willig	9.275	ITA Alberto Busnari	9.225

=== Women's artistic gymnastics ===
Event	Gold		Silver		Bronze	
Teams all-around	Italy; Daria Sarkhosh; Monica Bergamelli; Vanessa Ferrari; Federica Macrì; Ilaria Rosso	108.525	France; Rose-Eliandre Bellemare; Marine Debauve; Émilie Le Pennec; Katheleen Lindor; Caroline Ranc	108.325	Spain; Lenika De Simone; Thais Escolar; Tania Gener; Melodie Pulgarin	108.225
Individual all-around	ITA Vanessa Ferrari	37.750	ESP Tania Gener	37.025	GRE Stefani Bismpikou	35.925
Vault	ITA Vanessa Ferrari	9.187	ESP Tania Gener	9.175	ESP Melodie Pulgarin	9.162
Uneven bars	ESP Tania Gener	9.675	ITA Vanessa Ferrari	9.625	ESP Lenika De Simone	9.475
Balance beam	ITA Vanessa Ferrari	9.625	FRA Marine Debauve	9.525	FRA Émilie Le Pennec	9.300
Floor	ITA Vanessa Ferrari	9.600	FRA Émilie Le Pennec	9.475	FRA Marine Debauve	9.450

=== Rhythmic gymnastics ===
Event	Gold		Silver		Bronze	
Individual all-around	ESP Almudena Cid	61.650	FRA Delphine Ledoux	57.250	GRE Eleni Andriola	56.575

== Medal table ==
Place	Nation	1st place, gold medalist(s)	2nd place, silver medalist(s)	3rd place, bronze medalist(s)	Total
1	Spain	7	4	5	16
2	Italy	6	4	3	13
3	Tunisia	1	1	0	2
4	Slovenia	1	0	0	1
5	France	0	6	3	9
6	Algeria	0	1	0	1
6	Cyprus	0	1	0	1
8	Greece	0	0	2	2
Total		15	17	13	45

== Timetable ==
Artistic gymnastics events followed this timetable:

●	Competitions	●	Finals

June/July
24	25	26	27	28	29	30	01	02	03
	●	●	●	●	●				
