= Rose-Eliandre Bellemare =

French artistic gymnast

- Born: 20 August 1989 (age 37) Montpellier, France

Gymnastics career
- Discipline: Women's artistic gymnastics
- Country represented: France; (France)
Medal record
Representing France
Women's artistic gymnastics
Mediterranean Games
| Gold medal – first place | 2009 Pescara | Team |
| Silver medal – second place | 2005 Almería | Team |
| Silver medal – second place | 2009 Pescara | Floor exercise |

Rose-Eliandre Bellemare (born 20 August 1989) is a French artistic gymnast and a member of the French National Team. She participated in the 2008 Summer Olympics.

== Gymnastics career ==
Bellemare joined the French Junior Team at age 12. She competed at the junior European championships in 2004, and the senior competition in 2006. In 2006, she won the all-around title at the French Gymnastics Championships.

After a one-year hiatus due to injury, she made a comeback and qualified for the 2008 Olympic Games as a replacement. She later replaced Cassy Vericel on the team. Bellemare participated in the Olympic competition on three apparatuses and helped the French team to finish in 7th place overall for this event.

== Personal life ==
She is the sister of professional ice hockey player Pierre-Édouard Bellemare.
