= Artistic gymnastics at the 2009 Mediterranean Games =

== Competition schedule ==
Competitions followed this timetable:

●	Competitions	●	Finals

June/July
26	27	28	29	30	01	02	03	04	05
			●	●	●	●	●		

== Medal winners ==
=== Men's ===
Event	Gold		Silver		Bronze	
Individual all-around	FRA Benoît Caranobe	88.500	ITA Enrico Pozzo	88.100	FRA Hamilton Sabot	88.050
Teams all-around	Italy; Alberto Busnari; Matteo Morandi; Paolo Ottavi; Enrico Pozzo; Andrea Cingolani	267.500	France; Pierre-Yves Beny; Thomas Bouhail; Benoît Caranobe; Danny Pinheiro; Hamilton Sabot	267.300	Spain; Javier Gomez; Sergio Muñoz; Rafael Martínez; Fabian Gonzalez; Manuel Carballo	264.000
Floor	GRE Eleftherios Kosmidis	15.650	CRO Filip Ude	15.200	ESP Fabian Gonzalez	15.000
Pommel Horse	ITA Alberto Busnari	15.175	FRA Hamilton Sabot	14.875	ESP Sergio Muñoz	14.550
Rings	FRA Danny Pinheiro	16.075	ITA Matteo Morandi	15.825	FRA Pierre-Yves Beny	15.225
Vault	FRA Thomas Bouhail	14.642	ITA Andrea Cingolani	15.775	TUN Wajdi Bouallègue	15.462
Bars	ESP Manuel Carballo	14.875	FRA Danny Pinheiro	14.725	ESP Rafael Martínez	14.675
Horizontal bar	ITA Enrico Pozzo	15.400	SLO Aljaž Pegan	15.000	FRA Hamilton Sabot	14.875

=== Women's ===
Event	Gold		Silver		Bronze	
Individual all-around	FRA Youna Dufournet	56.950	ITA Elisabetta Preziosa	56.450	FRA Pauline Morel	55.950
Teams all-around	France; Marine Petit; Rose Eliandre Bellemare; Youna Dufournet; Aurelie Malaussena; Pauline Morel	166.900	Italy; Elisabetta Preziosa; Andrea La Spada; Paola Galante; Emily Armi	166.800	Greece; Vasiliki Millousi; Evgenia Zafeiraki; Andriana Syrigou; Viktoria Tsakalidou; Paschalina Mitrakou	159.600
Floor	ITA Elisabetta Preziosa	14.175	FRA Rose Eliandre Bellemare	13.875	ITA Emily Armi	13.825
Vault	FRA Youna Dufournet	13.975	TUR Goksu Uctas	13.650	GRE Evgenia Zafeiraki	13.612
Uneven bars	FRA Youna Dufournet	14.675	FRA Pauline Morel	14.250	ITA Paola Galante	14.000
Balance beam	GRE Vasiliki Millousi	14.725	FRA Youna Dufournet	14.625	ITA Elisabetta Preziosa	14.450

== Medal table ==
Rank	Nation	Gold	Silver	Bronze	Total
1	France (FRA)	7	6	4	17
2	Italy (ITA)	4	5	3	12
3	Greece (GRE)	2	0	2	4
4	Spain (ESP)	1	0	4	5
5	Croatia (CRO)	0	1	0	1
5	Slovenia (SLO)	0	1	0	1
5	Turkey (TUR)	0	1	0	1
8	Tunisia (TUN)	0	0	1	1
Totals (8 entries)		14	14	14	42
