= Tania Gener =

Spanish artistic gymnast

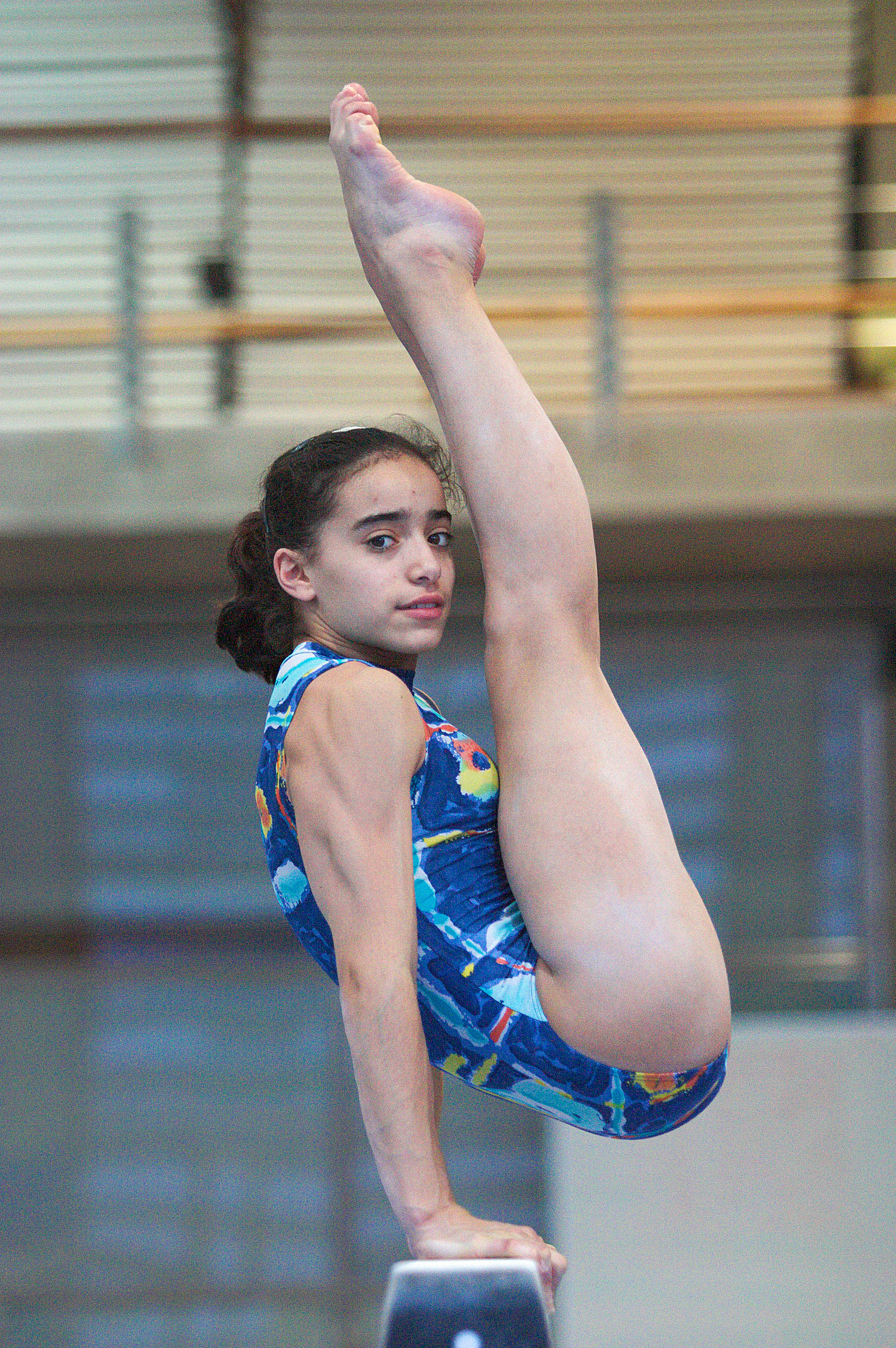

Personal information
- Born: 20 August 1988 (age 38) Badalona, Barcelona, Spain

Gymnastics career
- Discipline: Women's artistic gymnastics
- Country represented: Spain; (2004–2006)
Medal record
Women's gymnastics
Representing Spain
European Championships
Silver medal – second place	2005 Debrecen	Uneven bars
Mediterranean Games
Gold medal – first place	2005 Almería	Uneven bars
Silver medal – second place	2005 Almería	All-Around
Silver medal – second place	2005 Almería	Vault
Bronze medal – third place	2005 Almería	Team

Tania Gener (born 20 August 1988) is a Spanish artistic gymnast, representing her nation at international competitions.

She participated at the 2004 Summer Olympics. She also competed at world championships, including the 2006 World Artistic Gymnastics Championships in Aarhus, Denmark.
