= Matteo Angioletti =

Italian artistic gymnast

- Born: 8 November 1980 (age 45) Monza, Italy

Gymnastics career
- Discipline: Men's artistic gymnastics
- Country represented: Italy (2012)
- Club: Ginnastica Meda
Medal record
Men's artistic gymnastics
Mediterranean Games
Silver medal – second place	2001 Tunis	Team
Silver medal – second place	2005 Almería	Team
Silver medal – second place	2005 Almería	Vault

Matteo Angioletti (born 8 November 1980) is an Italian male artistic gymnast and part of the national team. He participated at the 2004 Summer Olympics, 2008 Summer Olympics and 2012 Summer Olympics.

== Biography ==
Born in 1980 in Monza, he began practicing Artistic gymnastics at age 6.

At age 23, he participated in the 2004 Summer Olympic Games, finishing 79th in the individual competition with 36,361 points. However, he failed to qualify for the individual apparatus finals (70th with 8,812 on floor exercise, 21st with 9,675 on rings, 6th with 9,662 on vault and 76th with 8,212 on bars).

Four years later, he took part in the 2008 Summer Olympic Games, scoring 14.25 on floor exercise, 15.625 on rings, 16.5 on vault and 13.575 on bars, getting the 64th total score with 59.95.

At 31, she participated in her third Summer Olympic Games, London 2012, scoring 14,033 points on floor exercise (50th), 15,066 on rings (15th) and 15,566 on vault (36th), 44,665 total points.

In his career he has won 2 medals in 2 Artistic Gymnastics World Cup, 1 silver and 1 bronze in the rings in 2009 and 2010 and 1 bronze in the finals in 2006.

In 2001 he won the silver medal, behind France, in the team competition at the Mediterranean Games in Tunis, together with Alberto Busnari, Igor Cassina, Andrea Coppolino, and Enrico Pozzo, while 4 years later, in Almería 2005 he was silver, again in the team competition, behind Spain, as a team with Alberto Busnari, Andrea Coppolino, Matteo Morandi, and Enrico Pozzo, and also in vault, behind Tunisian Wajdi Bouallègue, tied with Spaniard Iván San Miguel.

In 2006 he took part in the European Men's Artistic Gymnastics Championships in Volos, finishing 5th in the team competition and rings, while in Lausanne 2008 he was 8th in the team competition and in Milan 2009 7th in the rings. At the World Championships he participated in Anaheim 2003, Melbourne 2005, Aarhus 2006 (8th in the rings), Stuttgart 2007, London 2009 and 2010 World Artistic Gymnastics Championships.

At the Italian Artistic Gymnastics Championships he was silver in the rings in 2012.

He ended his career in 2016, at the age of 36.
