= Hamilton Sabot =

French gymnast

- Born: 31 May 1987 (age 39) Cagnes-sur-Mer, France

Gymnastics career
- Discipline: Men's artistic gymnastics
- Country represented: France
Medal record
Representing France
Olympic Games
Bronze medal – third place	2012 London	Parallel bars
European Championships
Bronze medal – third place	2010 Birmingham	Team
Bronze medal – third place	2010 Birmingham	Parallel bars
Mediterranean Games
Silver medal – second place	2009 Pescara	Pommel horse
Silver medal – second place	2009 Pescara	Team All-Around
Bronze medal – third place	2009 Pescara	Horizontal bar
Bronze medal – third place	2009 Pescara	Individual All-Around

Hamilton Sabot (born 31 May 1987 in Cagnes-Sur-Mer) is a French gymnast. He competed for the national team at the 2012 Summer Olympics in the Men's artistic team all-around. He won a bronze medal in parallel bars at the 2012 Summer Olympics.

On 1 January 2013, Sabot was made a Knight (Chevalier) of the French National Order of Merit. He has sponsored Étoile de Monaco.
