= Víctor Cano =

Spanish gymnast

- Full name: Víctor Cano Segura
- Born: 10 February 1978 (age 48) Barcelona, Spain

Gymnastics career
- Discipline: Men's artistic gymnastics
- Country represented: Spain
Medal record
Representing Spain
Men's artistic gymnastics
European Team Championships
Bronze medal – third place	2001 Riesa	Team
Mediterranean Games
Gold medal – first place	2001 Tunis	All-around
Gold medal – first place	2005 Almería	Team
Gold medal – first place	2005 Almería	Pommel horse
Silver medal – second place	1997 Bari	Team
Bronze medal – third place	2001 Tunis	Team

Víctor Cano Segura (born 10 February 1978) is a Spanish gymnast. He competed at the 2000 Summer Olympics and the 2004 Summer Olympics.
