= Matteo Morandi =

Italian artistic gymnast (born 1981)

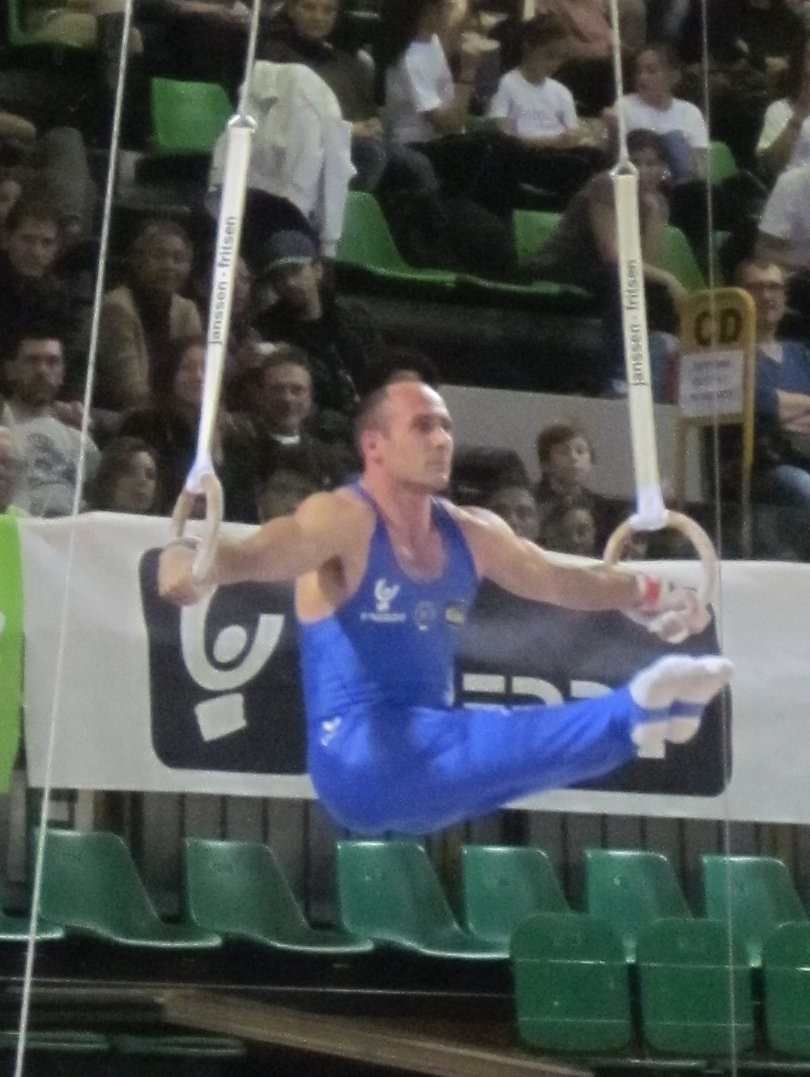
- Morandi in 2013

Personal information
- Born: 8 October 1981 (age 44) Vimercate

Gymnastics career
- Discipline: Men's artistic gymnastics
- Country represented: Italy
Medal record
Olympic Games
Bronze medal – third place	2012 London	Rings
World Championships
Bronze medal – third place	2002 Debrecen	Rings
Bronze medal – third place	2003 Anaheim	Rings
Bronze medal – third place	2005 Melbourne	Rings
Bronze medal – third place	2010 Rotterdam	Rings
World Cup Final
Bronze medal – third place	2004 Birmingham	Rings
European Championships
Gold medal – first place	2010 Birmingham	Rings
Silver medal – second place	2012 Montpellier	Rings
Bronze medal – third place	2004 Ljublijana	Rings
Bronze medal – third place	2013 Moscow	Rings
Summer Universiade
Bronze medal – third place	2005 İzmir	Rings
Mediterranean Games
Gold medal – first place	2005 Almería	Rings
Gold medal – first place	2009 Pescara	Team
Silver medal – second place	2005 Almería	Team
Silver medal – second place	2009 Pescara	Rings

Matteo Morandi (born 8 October 1981) is an Italian artistic gymnast. He was born in Vimercate. Morandi is married and has a daughter. He is a specialist at the rings.

== Olympic Games ==
He competed at the 2004 games taking 5th place at the Rings, the 2008 games taking 6th place at the Rings, and the 2012 games, in which he won the bronze medal in the Still Rings final. After the 2012 Summer Olympics he said that he will continue until the next Olympic Games in Rio de Janeiro 2016 and hopes to win another medal.

== World Championships ==
He won four bronze medals in the Rings at these games. The first in Debrecen 2002, Anaheim 2003, Melbourne 2005 and Rotterdam 2010.

== European Championships ==
In these games he won one gold, one silver and two bronze medals at the Rings. In Lubiana 2004 he won a bronze medal, in Birmingham 2010 a gold medal, in Montpellier 2012 a silver medal and in 2013 Moscow a bronze medal.

== Named skill ==
The "Morandi" is a Marinich-style handspring front flip in the tucked position. It was awarded a D value by the Code of Points.

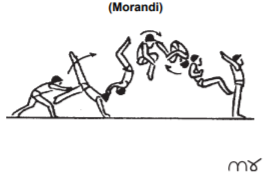
Portrayal of the Morandi by the 2017-2022 Code of Points
