= Thomas Bouhail =

French gymnast of Algerian descent

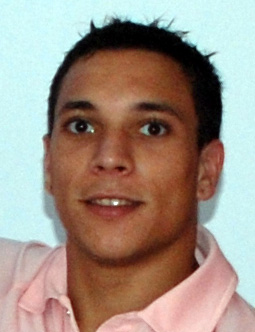

Personal information
- Born: 3 July 1986 (age 40) Montfermeil, France

Gymnastics career
- Discipline: Men's artistic gymnastics
- Country represented: France
Medal record
Men's artistic gymnastics
Representing France
Olympic Games
Silver medal – second place	2008 Beijing	Vault
World Championships
Gold medal – first place	2010 Rotterdam	Vault
World Cup Final
Gold medal – first place	2008 Madrid	Vault
European Championships
Gold medal – first place	2009 Milan	Vault
Gold medal – first place	2011 Berlin	Vault
Silver medal – second place	2007 Amsterdam	Floor exercise
Mediterranean Games
Gold medal – first place	2009 Pescara	Vault
Silver medal – second place	2009 Pescara	Team
Bronze medal – third place	2005 Almería	Team

Thomas Bouhail (born 3 July 1986 in Montfermeil, Seine-Saint-Denis) is a French gymnast of Algerian descent. He won a silver medal in vault at the 2008 Summer Olympics.

In December 2011, just a few months before the 2012 Summer Olympics, Bouhail suffered a fractured tibia and fibula following a fall during a training session. Later it was revealed that the injury was more serious than it was first thought as it also affected his knee ligaments and the sciatic nerve, which led to complications and Bouhail had to undergo 15 operations in six weeks to have his leg saved. The surgical intervention was successful; however, it was unclear whether he could ever return to competitive gymnastics. Bouhail has personally announced the end of his gymnastics career and is now a gymnastics trainer.
