= Benoît Caranobe =

French gymnast (born 1980)

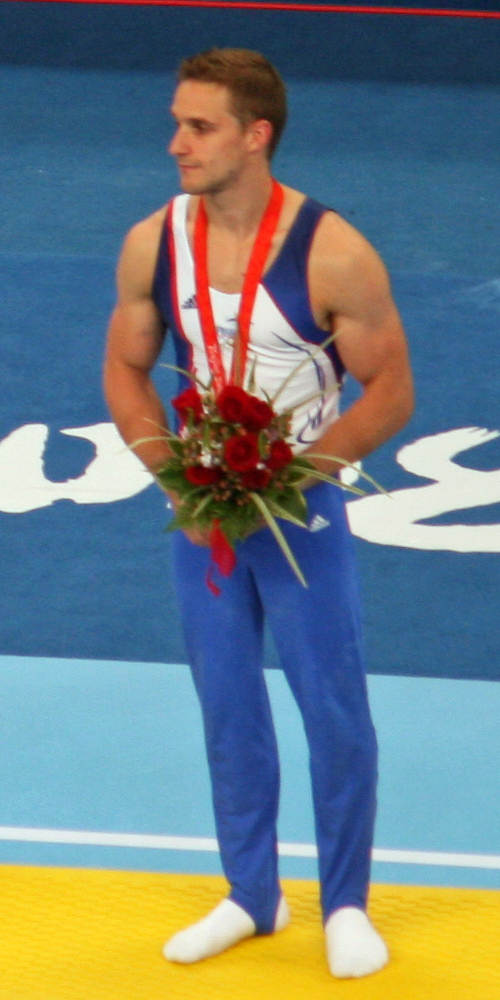

Personal information
- Full name: Benoît Caranobe
- Born: 12 June 1980 (age 46) Vitry-sur-Seine, France
- Height: 164 cm (5 ft 5 in)

Gymnastics career
- Discipline: Men's artistic gymnastics
- Country represented: France
- Retired: 2013
Medal record
Olympic Games
Bronze medal – third place	2008 Beijing	Individual All-Around
Universiade
Gold medal – first place	2001 Beijing	Vault
Mediterranean Games
Gold medal – first place	2009 Pescara	Individual All-Around
Silver medal – second place	2009 Pescara	Team All-Around

Benoît Caranobe (born 12 June 1980 in Vitry-sur-Seine) is a French former gymnast who won a bronze medal at the 2008 Beijing Olympics. Caranobe was the first Frenchman to medal in the Individual All-Around competition since Marco Torrès won silver and Jean Gounot won bronze in said event at the 1920 Antwerp Olympics.

== Gymnastics career ==
=== 2004 Athens Olympics ===
In his first Olympic appearance, Benoît Caranobe placed 19th in the men's all around competition and helped the French men's team to a 9th-place finish in the team qualification, though not enough to make the team finals.

=== 2008 Beijing Olympics ===
Caranobe qualified to the all around finals in tenth place, 2.950 points behind the leader Yang Wei. In the all-around finals, Caranobe finished in third place, ahead of medal favorites Hiroyuki Tomita, Fabian Hambüchen, and Yang Tae-Young. His third-place finish is particularly surprising given that Benoît had placed only third at the French National Gymnastics championships, and his overall score was only 0.050 behind silver medalist, legendary Kohei Uchimura of Japan.

== Post-gymnastics career ==
Caranobe retired from competition in 2013. He is the owner of a wine shop in Noisy-le-Grand near Paris and also works as an acrobat at the Moulin Rouge cabaret.
