= Sam Simpson (gymnast) =

Australian artistic gymnast

Samuel Simpson
- Born: 24 April 1984 (age 42)
- Height: 167 cm (5 ft 6 in)

Gymnastics career
- Discipline: Men's artistic gymnastics
- Country represented: Australia; (2008)
- Gym: Lawnton Academy of Artistic Gymnastics; Australian Institute of Sport; Queensland Academy of Sport

Samuel Simpson (born 24 April 1984) is an Australian male artistic gymnast, representing his nation at international competitions. He participated at the 2008 Summer Olympics in Beijing, China.

== Early life and education ==
Simpson started gymnastics at an early age and with the Australian Institute of Sport at age 3. He later trained at Queensland Academy of Sport where he was coached by Sergei Chinkar.

== Gymnastics career ==
Simpson was the top-placed Australian athlete at the 2007 World Artistic Gymnastics Championships in the all-around, beating out teammate Joshua Jefferis by 0.025 points. As a result, he qualified for the 2008 Summer Olympics as the Oceania wildcard over Australian teammates Philippe Rizzo and Prashanth Sellathurai.

== Post-gymnastics career ==
Simpson joined the Sydney Gymnastic and Aquatic Centre in March 2014 as a full-time coach.
