= Enrico Pozzo =

Italian artistic gymnast

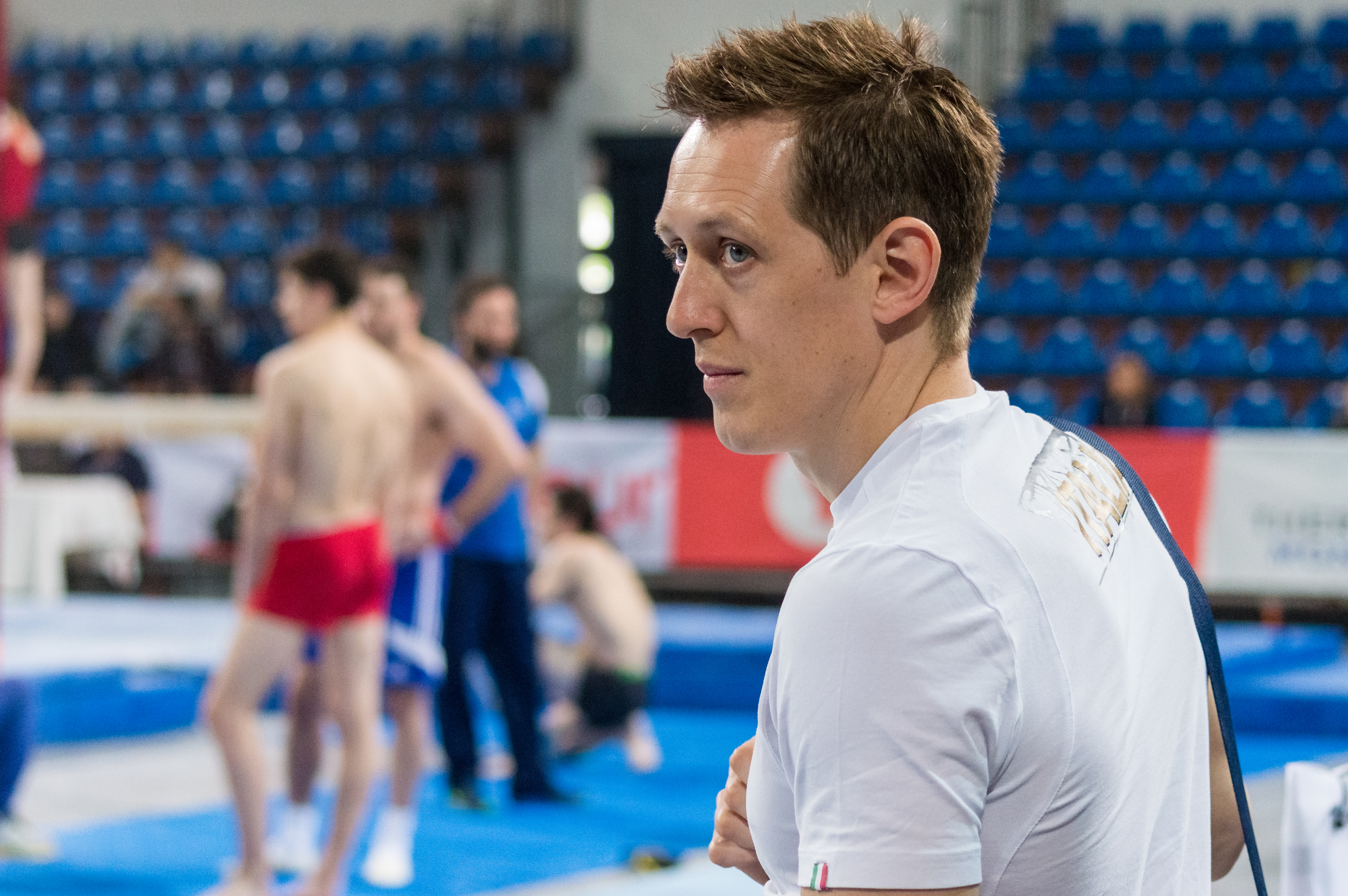
- Enrico Pozzo

Personal information
- Born: 12 February 1981 (age 45)

Gymnastics career
- Discipline: Men's artistic gymnastics
- Country represented: Italy (2004-)
- Head coaches: Andrea Sacchi; Maurizio Allievi
Medal record
Men's artistic gymnastics
Mediterranean Games
Gold medal – first place	2009 Pescara	Team
Gold medal – first place	2009 Pescara	Horizontal bar
Silver medal – second place	2001 Tunis	Team
Silver medal – second place	2001 Tunis	Floor
Silver medal – second place	2005 Almería	Team
Silver medal – second place	2009 Pescara	All-Around
Silver medal – second place	2013 Mersin	Team
Bronze medal – third place	2005 Almería	Floor
Bronze medal – third place	2013 Mersin	Horizontal bar

Enrico Pozzo (born 12 February 1981) is an Italian male artistic gymnast and part of the national team. He participated at the 2004 Summer Olympics 2008 Summer Olympics and 2012 Summer Olympics.
