= Manuel Carballo (gymnast) =

Spanish gymnast

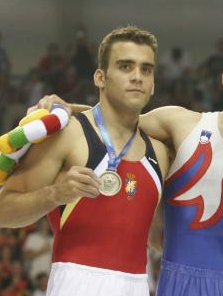
- Manuel Carballo

Personal information
- Born: November 23, 1982 (age 43) Madrid

Gymnastics career
- Discipline: Men's artistic gymnastics
- Country represented: Spain
Medal record
Men's artistic gymnastics
Representing Spain
European Championships
Gold medal – first place	2005 Debrecen	Parallel bars
Mediterranean Games
Gold medal – first place	2005 Almería	Team
Gold medal – first place	2009 Pescara	Parallel bars
Silver medal – second place	2005 Almería	Parallel bars
Bronze medal – third place	2005 Almería	All-around
Bronze medal – third place	2009 Pescara	Team

Manuel Carballo Martínez (born 23 November 1982) in Madrid, Spain is a Spanish artistic gymnast.

Carballo is from a renowned gymnastics family. His father Jesús Sr is the coach of the Spanish national women's team and his older brother Jesús Carballo Jr was a two time world champion. Another brother, Javier, is also involved in Gymnastics.

Carballo was the 2005 European Champion on the Parallel Bars with a score of 9.712. Manuel qualified in second place for the 2005 World Championships final on the event. Manuel performed a clean routine until his dismount, where a large stumble left him out of medal contention. Carballo has also won numerous medals at World Cup competitions. Carballo was a member of the Spanish team at the 2007 World Championships.

In 2008, Carballo was part of the Spanish Olympic Team, finishing 11th.
