= Alberto Busnari =

Italian artistic gymnast

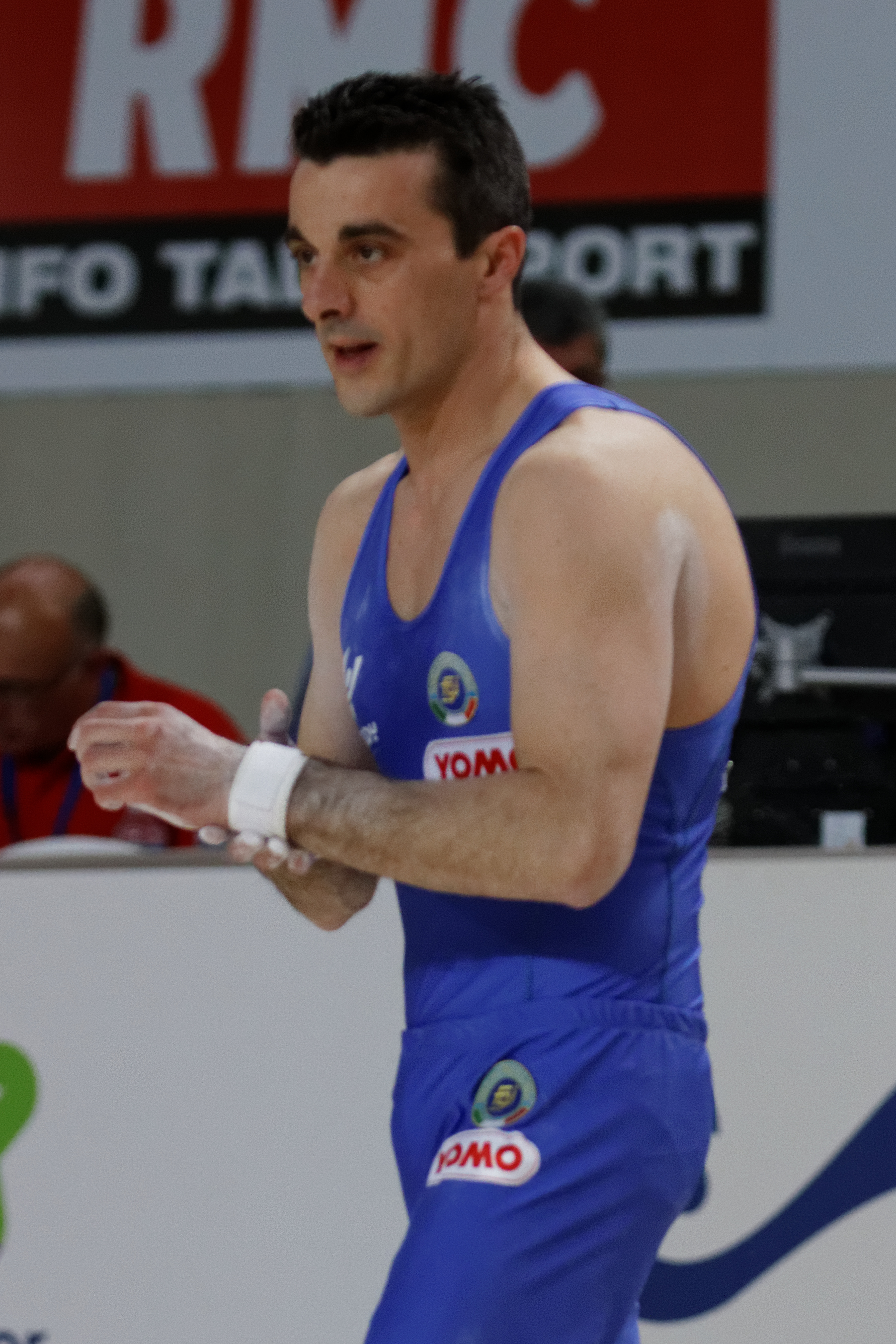
- Alberto Busnari at the 2015 European Artistic Gymnastics Championships

Personal information
- Born: 4 October 1978 (age 47) Melzo, Italy
- Height: 172 cm (5 ft 8 in)

Gymnastics career
- Discipline: Men's artistic gymnastics
- Country represented: Italy (1997–2015)
Medal record
Representing Italy
European Championships
Silver medal – second place	2004 Ljublijana	Pommel Horse
Bronze medal – third place	2002 Patras	Pommel Horse
Bronze medal – third place	2015 Montpellier	Pommel Horse
Summer Universiade
Bronze medal – third place	1997 Sicily	Pommel Horse
Bronze medal – third place	1999 Mallorca	Horizontal Bar
Mediterranean Games
Gold medal – first place	2009 Pescara	Team
Gold medal – first place	2009 Pescara	Pommel horse
Silver medal – second place	2001 Tunis	Team
Silver medal – second place	2001 Tunis	Pommel horse
Silver medal – second place	2005 Almería	Team
Bronze medal – third place	2001 Tunis	All-around
Bronze medal – third place	2005 Almería	Pommel horse
Bronze medal – third place	2005 Almería	Horizontal bar

Alberto Busnari (born 4 October 1978) is an Italian male artistic gymnast and part of the national team. He participated at the 2008 Summer Olympics in Beijing, China, the 2012 Summer Olympics in London, UK and 2013 World Artistic Gymnastics Championships in Antwerp, Belgium. An element on pommel horse is named after Busnari.

Execution of the Busnari

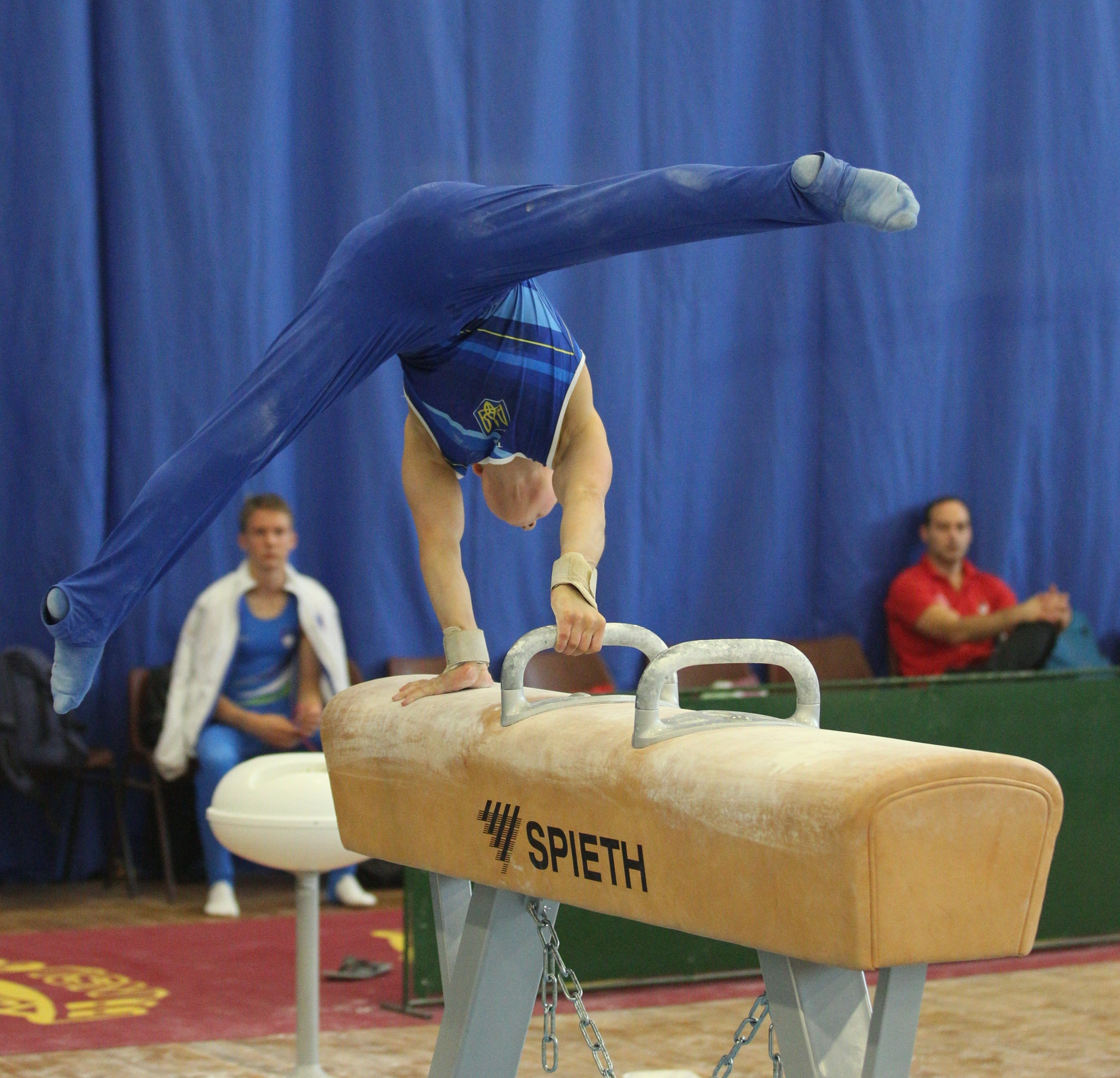
Performed by a young gymnast during the pommel horse apparatus final at the International Junior Budapest Cup

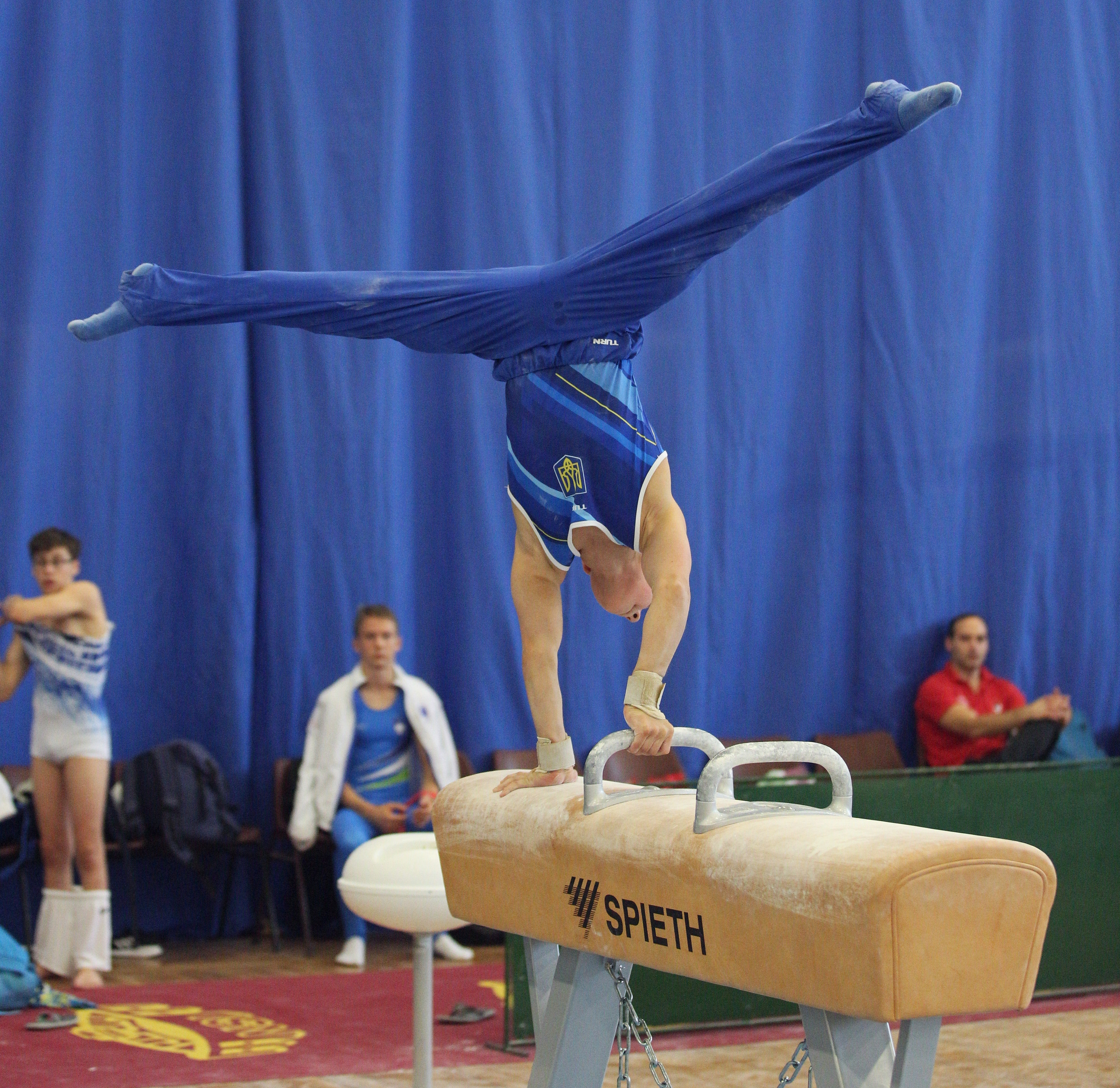

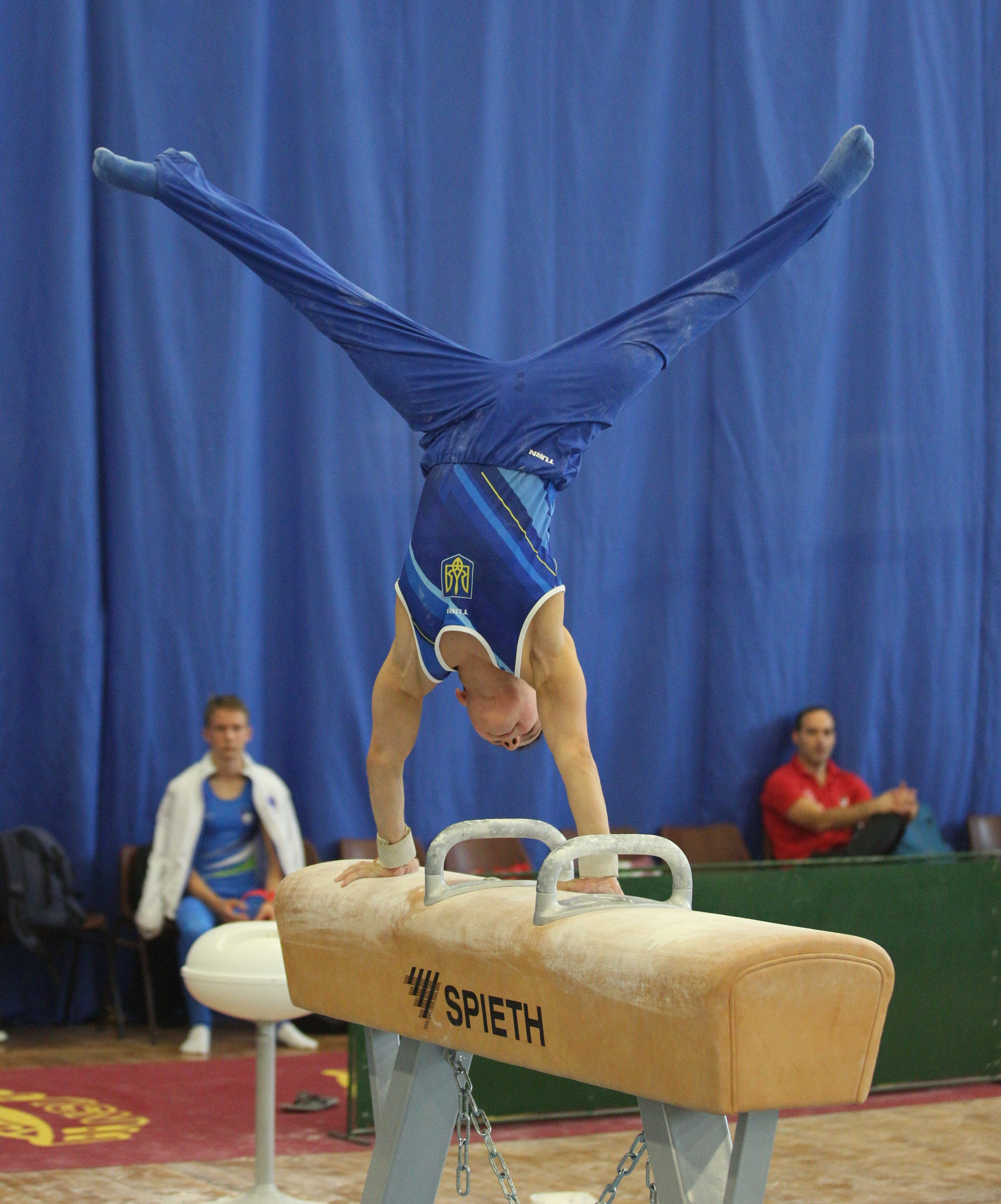

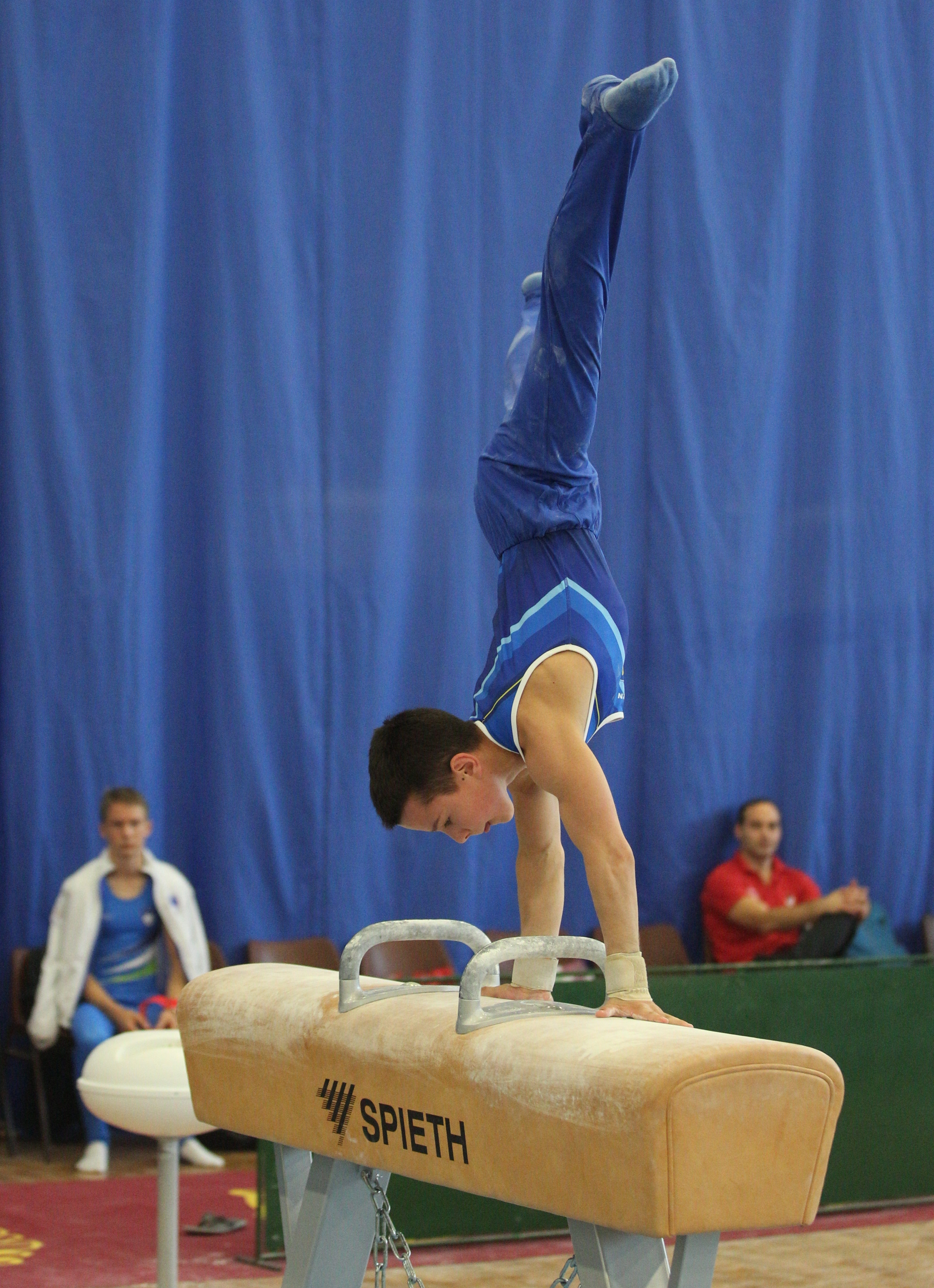

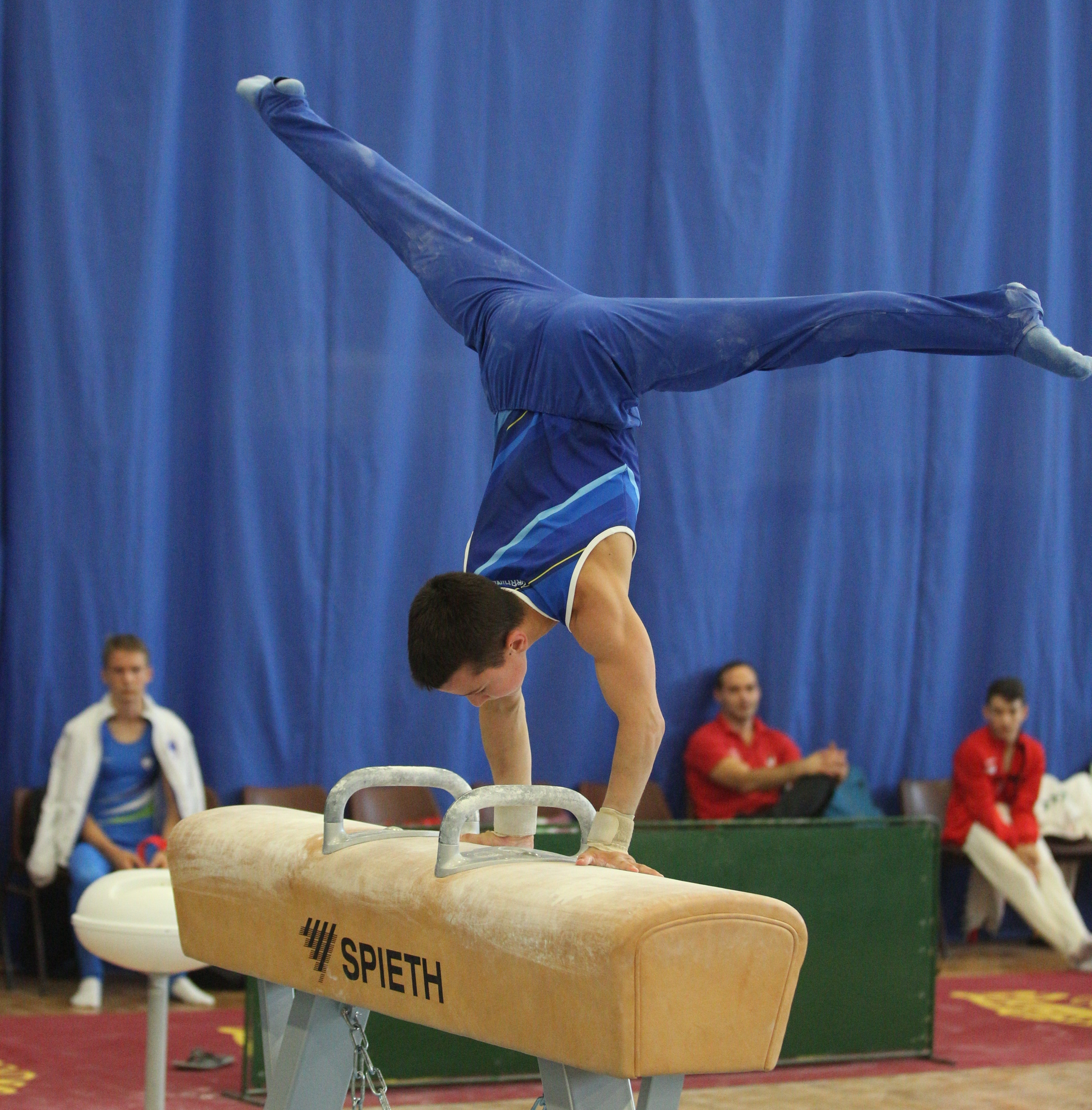

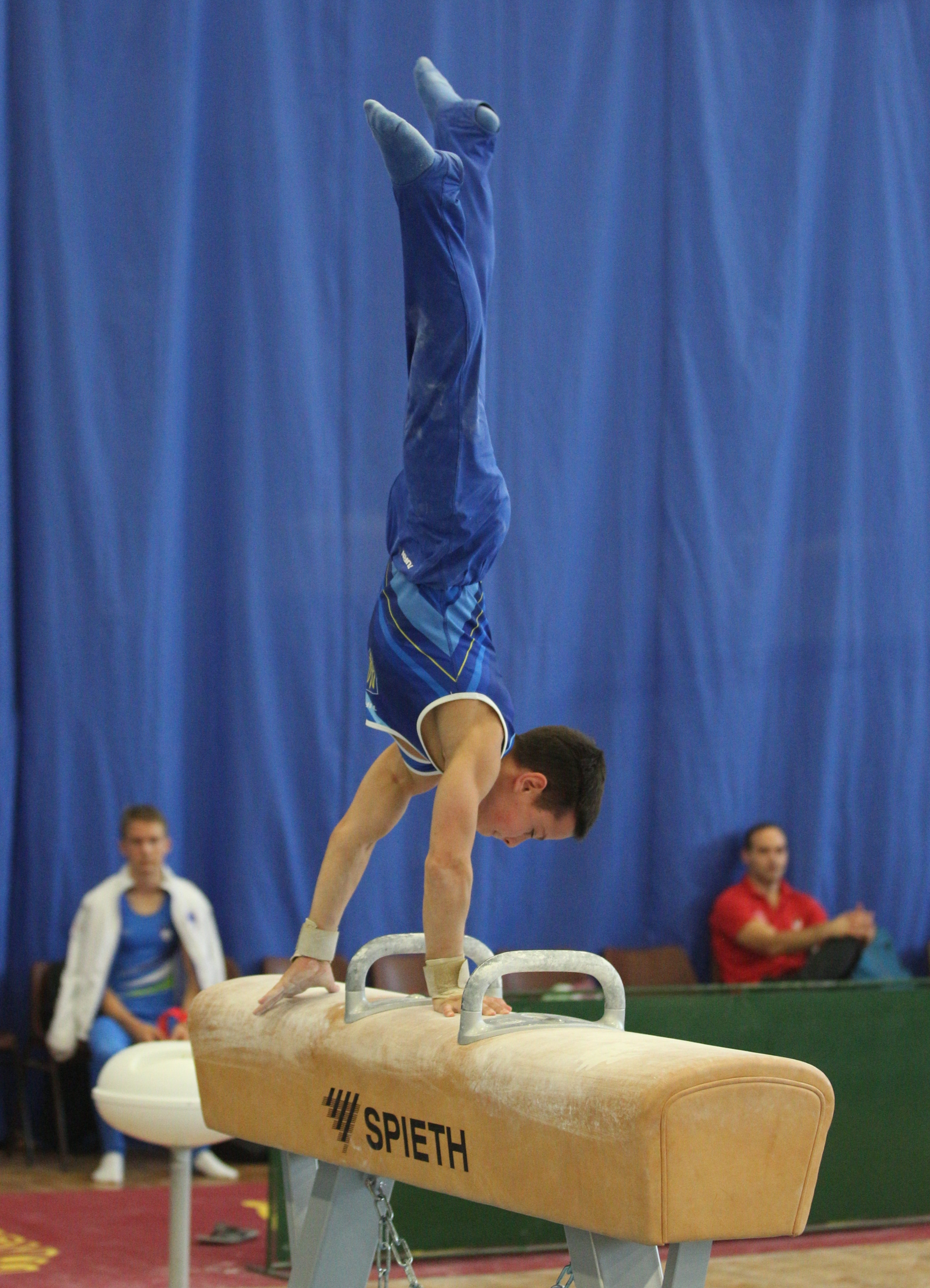

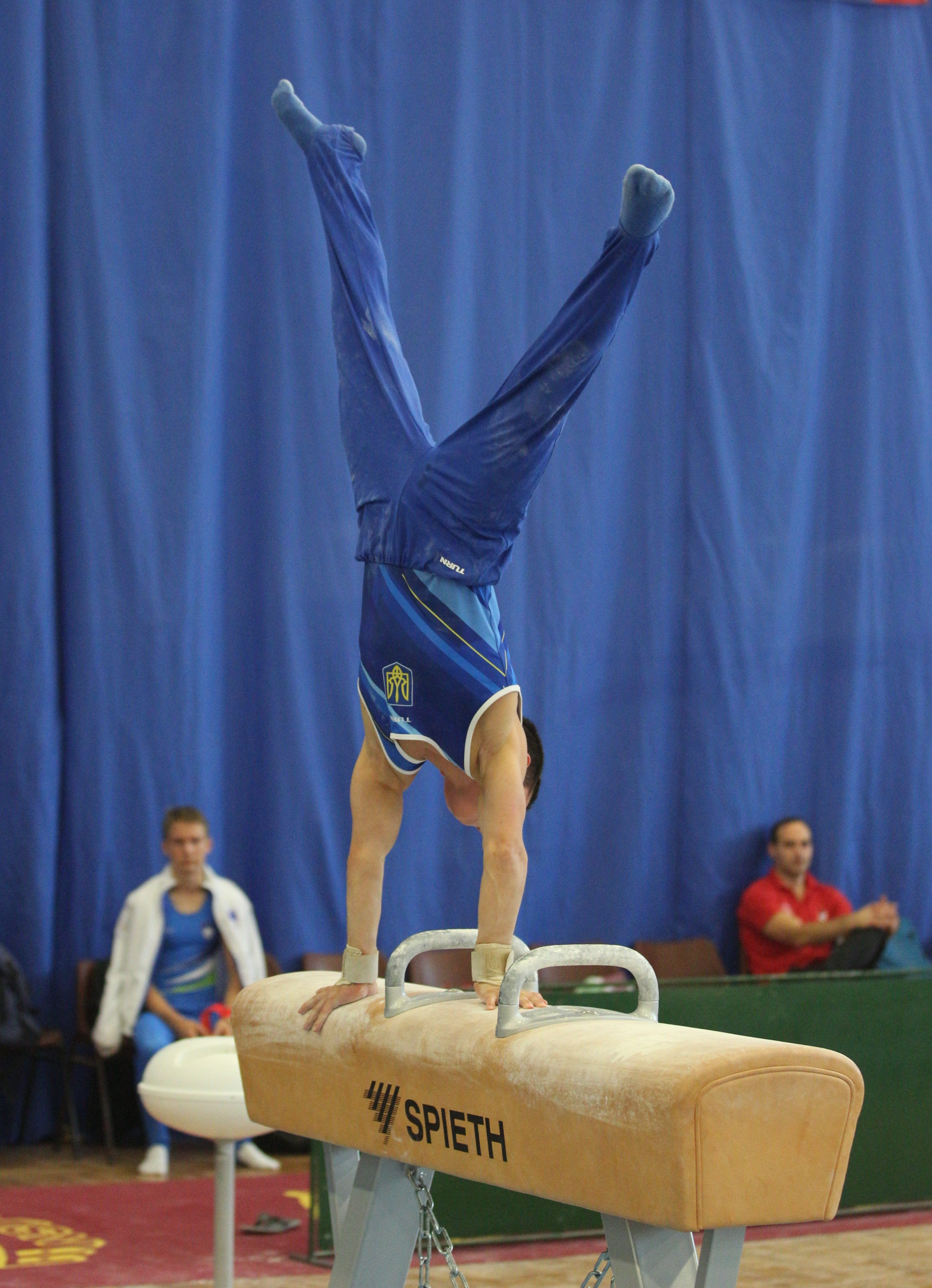

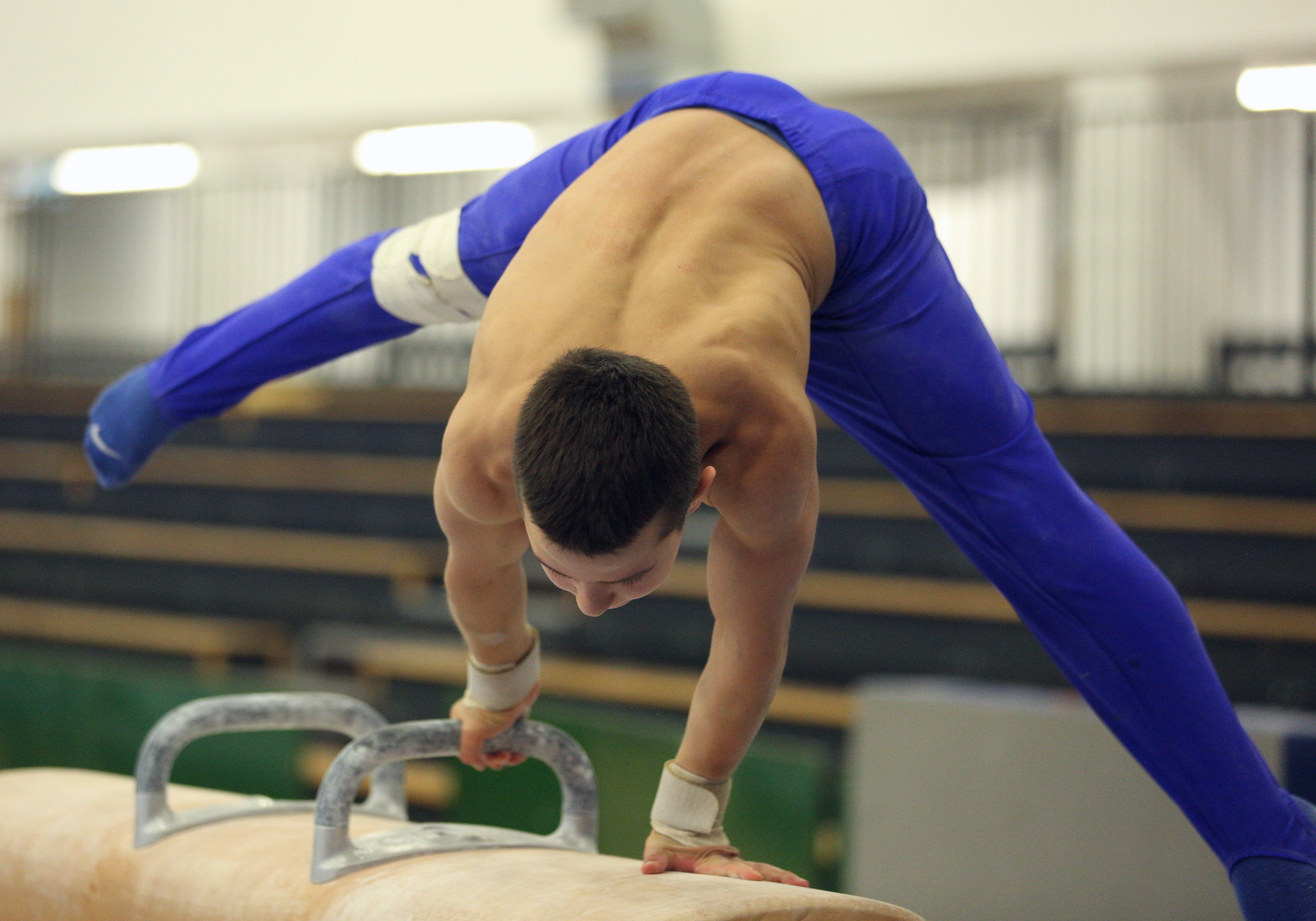
Executed during training from a different point of view

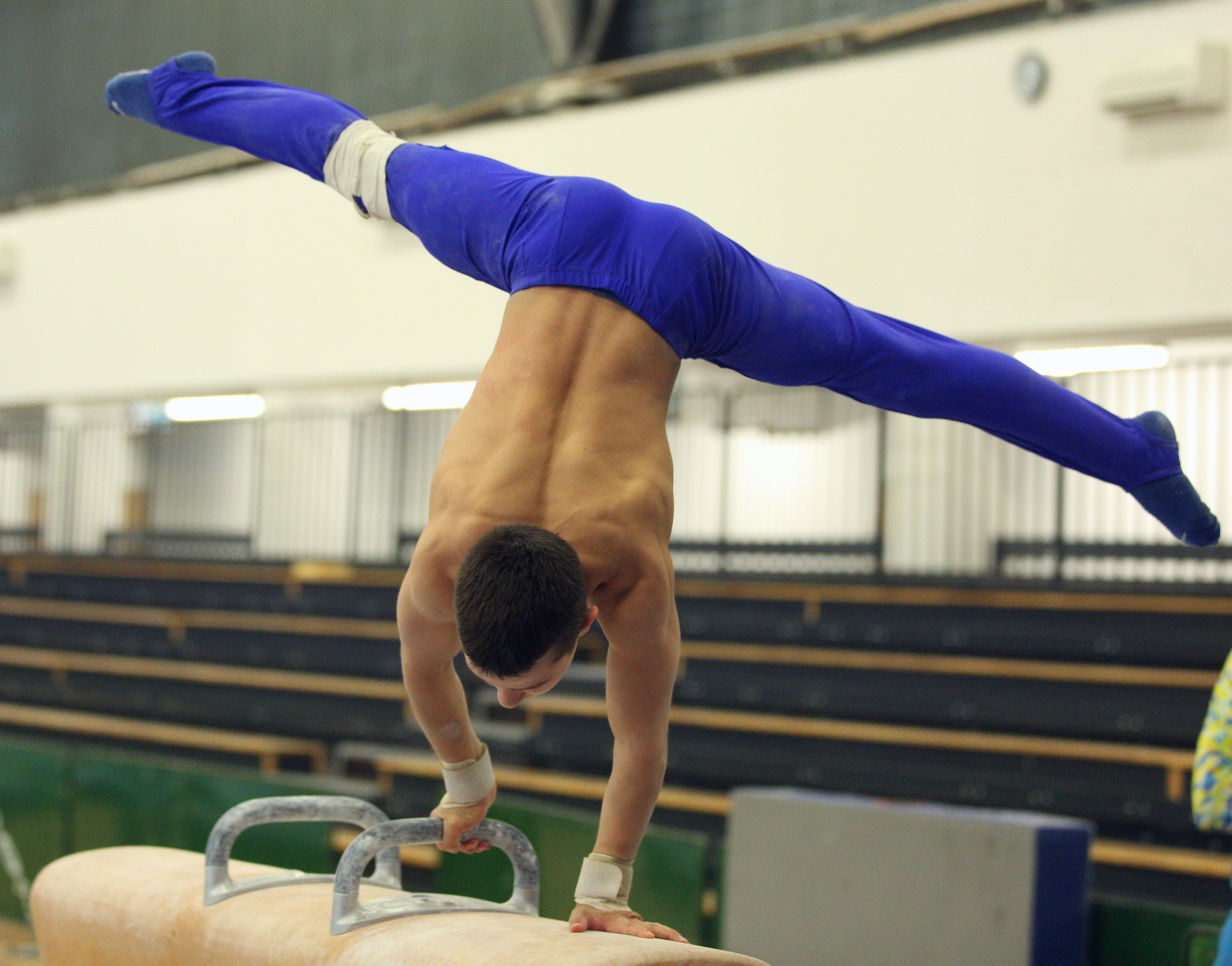

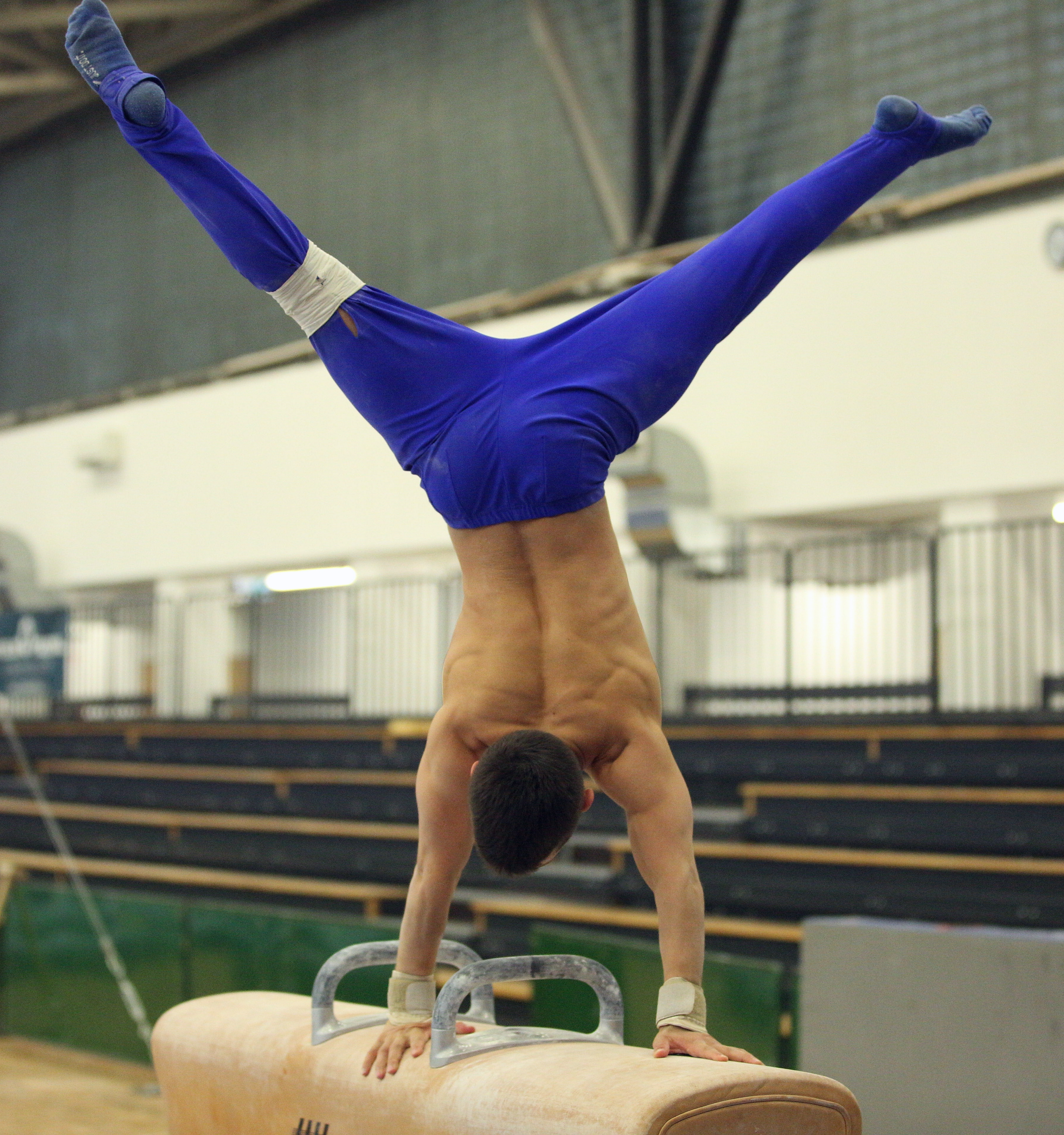

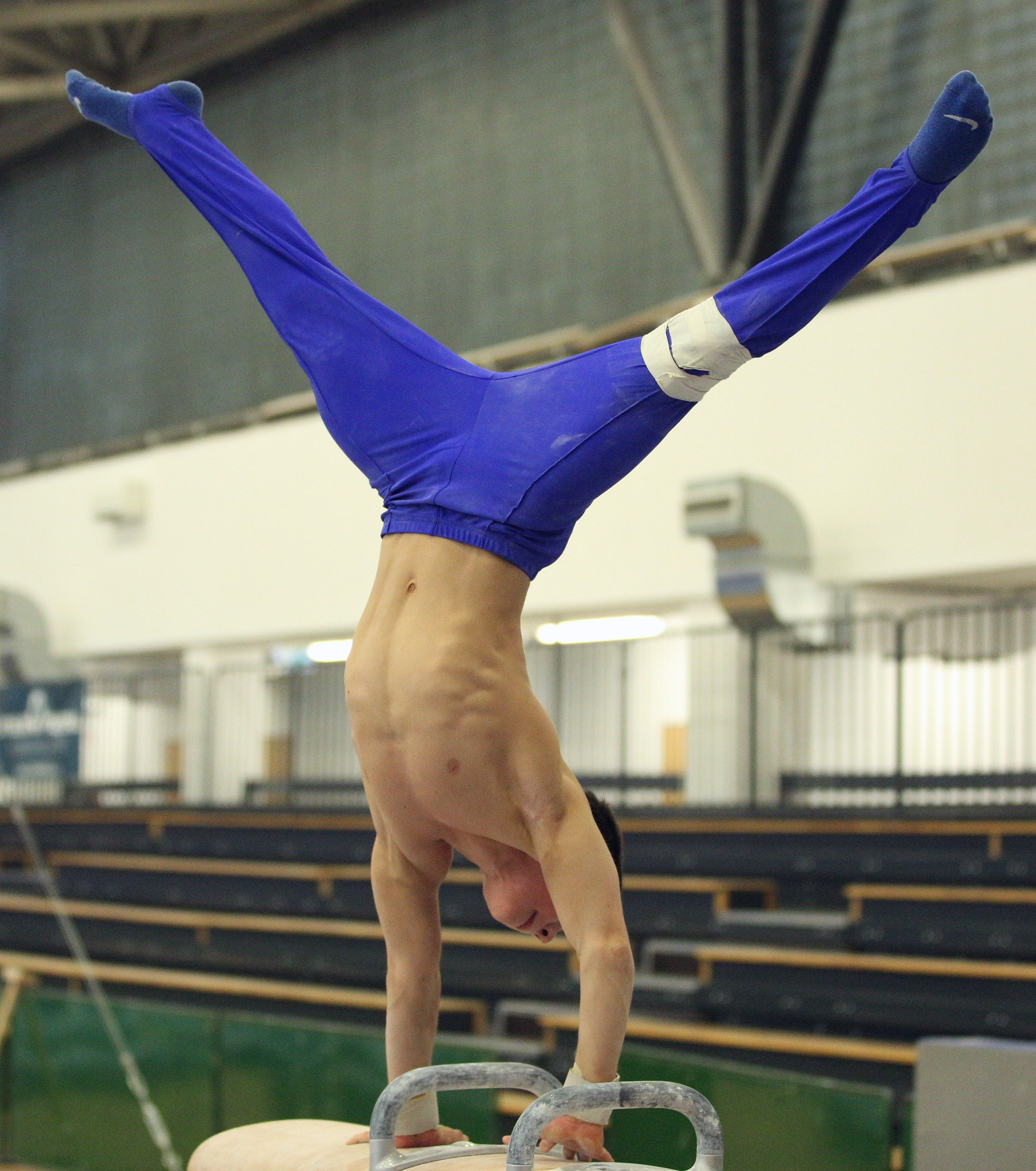

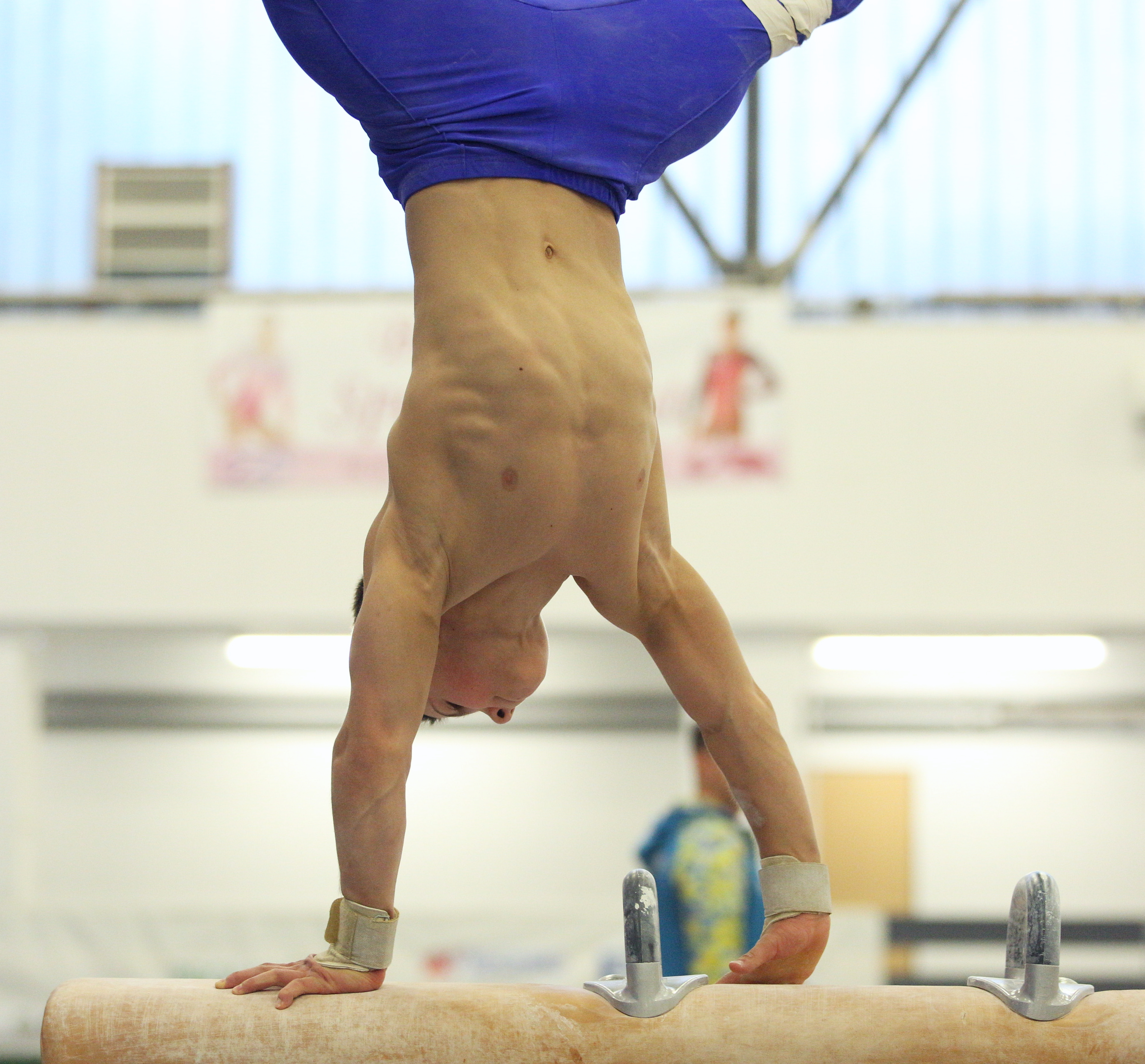
Opposite point of view, close-up

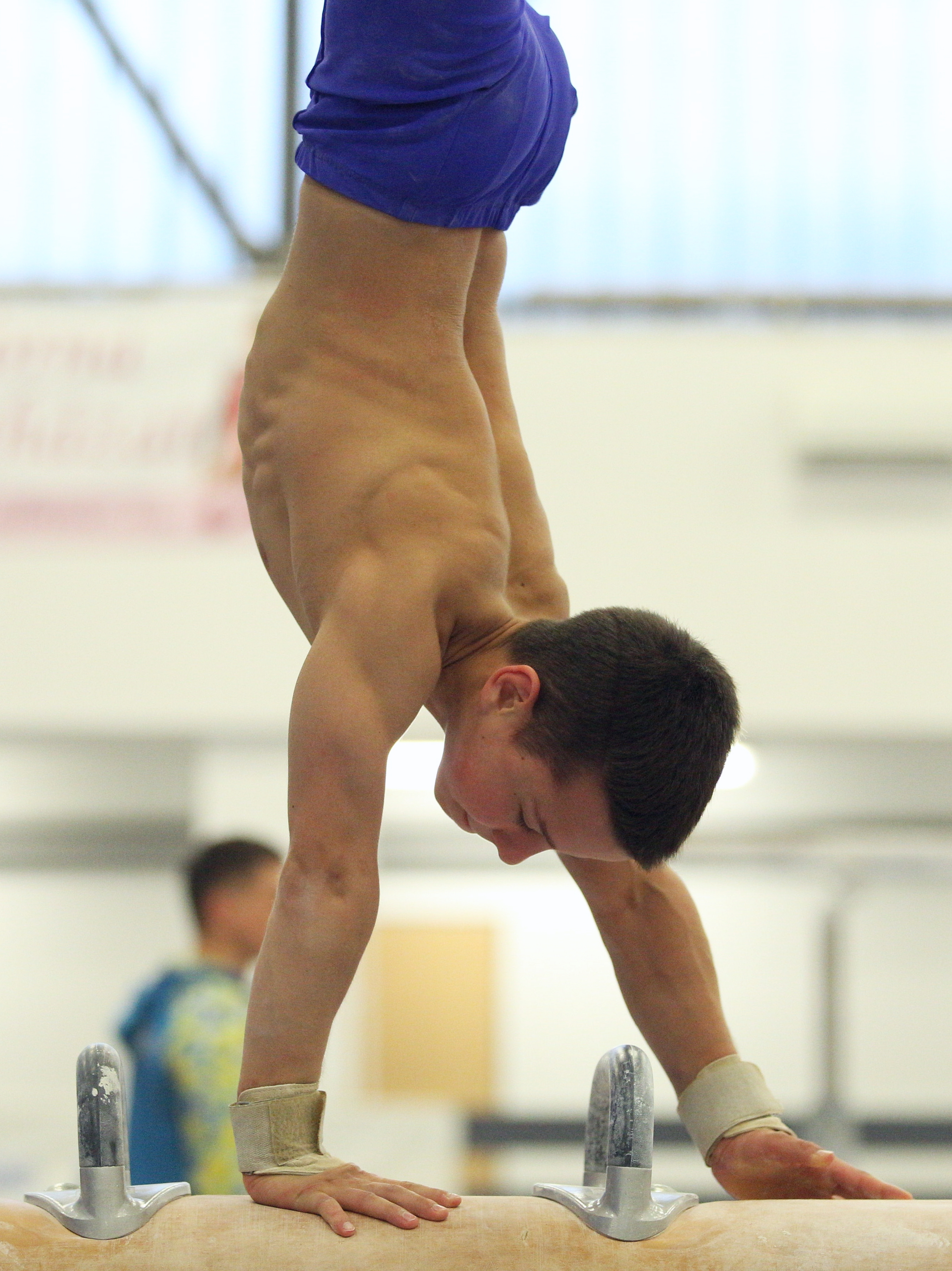

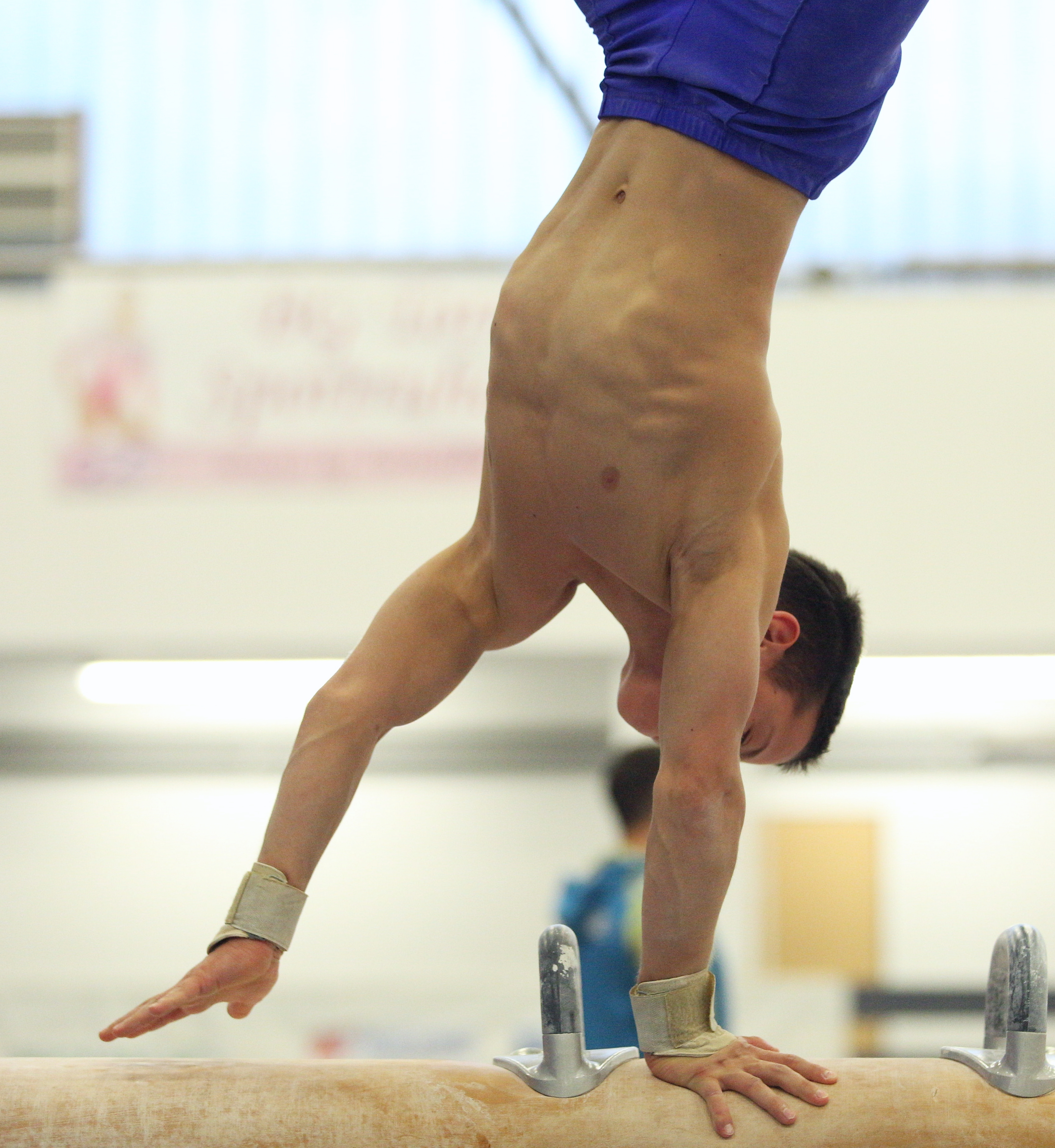
