= Rafael Martínez (gymnast) =

Spanish gymnast (born 1983)

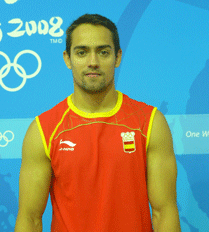

Personal information
- Full name: Rafael Martínez Barrena
- Nickname: Rafa
- Born: 10 December 1983 (age 42) Madrid
- Height: 163 cm (5 ft 4 in)

Gymnastics career
- Discipline: Men's artistic gymnastics
- Country represented: Spain
- Club: Mostoles
- Head coach: Alvaro Montesinos
- Assistant coach: Fernando Siscar
- Choreographer: Fuensante
Medal record
Men's artistic gymnastics
Representing Spain
European Championships
Gold medal – first place	2005 Debrecen	All-around
Gold medal – first place	2007 Amsterdam	Floor exercise
Silver medal – second place	2004 Ljubljana	All-around
Bronze medal – third place	2004 Ljubljana	Floor exercise
Mediterranean Games
Gold medal – first place	2005 Almería	Team
Gold medal – first place	2005 Almería	All-around
Gold medal – first place	2005 Almería	Floor exercise
Gold medal – first place	2005 Almería	Horizontal bar
Bronze medal – third place	2005 Almería	Parallel bars
Bronze medal – third place	2009 Pescara	Parallel bars
Bronze medal – third place	2009 Pescara	Team all-around

Rafael Martínez Barrena (born 10 December 1983 in Madrid) is a Spanish artistic gymnast. He has represented Spain at the World Championship, European and Olympic level.

He represented Spain at the 2004 Summer Olympics, where he placed 5th in the all-around. In 2005, he was the European All Around Champion. He narrowly missed a medal in the same event at the 2005 World Artistic Gymnastics Championships, where he placed 4th in the Final. He placed 9th the next year. At the 2007 European Championships, he placed 4th in the All Around and won the Floor Exercise title. Martinez was a member of the Spanish Team at the 2007 World Artistic Gymnastics Championships.
