= Ivan San Miguel =

Spanish artistic gymnast

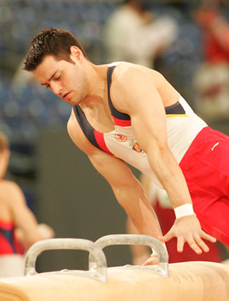

Personal information
- Born: January 12, 1985 (age 41) Villamayor, Asturias, Spain

Gymnastics career
- Discipline: Men's artistic gymnastics
- Country represented: Spain (2010)

Ivan San Miguel (born 12 January 1985) is a Spanish male artistic gymnast who is a member of the national team. He participated at the 2008 Summer Olympics. He also competed at world championships, including the 2010 World Artistic Gymnastics Championships in Rotterdam, Netherlands.

== Career ==
In 2005, he finished 6th in vault at the São Paulo World Cup, and at the 2005 Mediterranean Games in Almería , he won team gold and vault silver. In 2006, he finished 8th on rings at the Lyon World Cup and 6th on rings at the Moscow World Cup. He finished 6th in the team competition at the 2007 World Championships. He was part of the Spanish artistic gymnastics team for the 2008 Beijing Olympic Games. He participated in the team all-around, finishing in 11th place. The Spanish team in Beijing consisted of Iván, Isaac Botella, Manuel Carballo, Gervasio Deferr, Rafael Martínez, and Sergio Muñoz. In 2010, he won bronze on rings and vault at the Porto World Cup. He retired in September 2013.
