= 2009 Russian Artistic Gymnastics Championships =

Gymnastics competition in Russia

Russian Artistic Gymnastics Championships
- Location: Bryansk, Russia
- Date: March 6–14, 2009

The 2009 Russian Artistic Gymnastics Championships was held in Bryansk, Bryansk Oblast, Russia between 6–14 March 2009.

== Medalists ==
Event	Gold	Silver	Bronze
Men
Team	Central Federal District; Yuri Ryazanov; Dmitry Barkalov; Timur Kuzmin; Anton Neudakin; Sergei Khorokhordin; Alexander Kalabin	Siberian Federal District; Andrey Cherkasov; Nikita Ignatyev; Igor Pakhomenko; Maksim Deviatovski; Anton Golotsutskov; Konstantin Pluzhnikov	Moscow; Vladimir Olennikov; Dmitry Gogotov; Emin Garibov; Dmitry Stolyarov; Dmitry Yakubovsky; Mikhail Bodnar
All-Around	Yuri Ryazanov	Vladimir Olennikov	Dmitry Barkalov
Floor	Yuri Ryazanov	Anton Golotsutskov	Anton Neudakin
Pommel horse	Andrei Perevozchikov	Andrei Likhovitsky	Dmitry Stolyarov
Rings	Konstantin Pluzhnikov	Yuri Ryazanov	Ruslan Nigmadzyanov
Vault	Denis Ablyazin	Anton Golotsutskov	Anton Lobachev
Parallel bars	Nikolai Kryukov	Maksim Deviatovski	Nikita Ignatyev
Horizontal bar	Sergei Khorokhordin	Yuri Ryazanov	Maksim Deviatovski
Women
Team	Moscow; Yulia Berger; Maria Chibiskova; Aliya Mustafina; Anna Myzdrikova; Elena Syrnikova; Elena Zamolodchikova	Central Federal District; Ksenia Afanasyeva; Anastasia Cherepnina; Daria Goncharova; Evgeniya Klimova; Tamara Kokhadze; Ksenia Semyonova	Saint Petersburg; Olga Alexeyeva; Ekaterina Krylova; Tatiana Nabieva; Alina Rybalova; Diana Sapronova; Irina Sazonova
All-around	Aliya Mustafina	Ksenia Semyonova	Tatiana Nabieva
Vault	Yulia Berger	Kristina Goryunova	Anna Dementyeva
Uneven bars	Ksenia Semyonova	Aliya Mustafina	Ksenia Afanasyeva
Balance beam	Aliya Mustafina; Ksenia Afanasyeva	Ksenia Semyonova	N/A
Floor	Ksenia Semyonova	Kristina Goryunova	Aliya Mustafina
