= Russian Artistic Gymnastics Championships =

Annual Russian artistic gymnastics competition

The Russian Artistic Gymnastics Championships is an annual Russian national artistic gymnastics competition. It is organized by the Ministry of Sport and the Russian Artistic Gymnastics Federation and financed from the federal budget. Since 2008 the championships have always been held in the town of Penza.

== Medalists ==
=== Women ===
==== Team competition ====
Year	Location	Gold	Silver	Bronze
2000	Moscow	Moscow	Saint Petersburg	Novgorod Oblast
2002	Moscow	Central Federal District	Saint Petersburg	Moscow
2003	Moscow	Saint Petersburg	Central Federal District	Moscow
2004	Moscow	Central Federal District	Saint Petersburg	Moscow
2005	Moscow	Central Federal District	Saint Petersburg	Moscow
2006	Novosibirsk	Moscow	Saint Petersburg	Volgograd Oblast
2007	Lobnya	Central Federal District	Saint Petersburg	Moscow
2009	Bryansk	Moscow	Central Federal District	Saint Petersburg
2010	Penza	Central Federal District	Moscow	Saint Petersburg
2011	Penza	Central Federal District	Moscow	Volga Federal District
2012	Penza	Moscow	Central Federal District	Northwestern Federal District
2013	Penza	Central Federal District	Moscow	Volga Federal District
2014	Penza	Central Federal District	Moscow	Saint Petersburg
2015	Penza	Central Federal District	Moscow	Volga Federal District
2016	Penza	Central Federal District	Moscow	Volga Federal District
2017	Kazan	Moscow	Central Federal District - 1	Saint Petersburg
2018	Kazan	Moscow - 1	Central Federal District	Moscow - 2
2019	Penza	Moscow - 1	Central Federal District	Saint Petersburg
2020	Penza	Saint Petersburg	Moscow	Southern Federal District
2021	Penza	Moscow	Southern Federal District	Volga
2022	Kazan	Volga	Moscow	Central
2023	Kazan	Moscow	Novgorod	Voronezh
2024	Sochi	Moscow	Vladimir Oblast	Krasnodar Krai
2025	Sirius	Vladimir Oblast	Moscow	Krasnodar Krai
2026	Kaluga	Moscow	Krasnodar Krai	Vladimir Oblast

==== All-around ====
Year	Location	Gold	Silver	Bronze
1993	Moscow	Svetlana Khorkina	Oxana Fabrichnova	Dina Kochetkova
1994	Voronezh	Dina Kochetkova	Svetlana Khorkina	Oxana Fabrichnova
1995	Moscow	Svetlana Khorkina	Oxana Fabrichnova	Dina Kochetkova
1996	Moscow	Rozalia Galiyeva	Svetlana Khorkina	Elena Dolgopolova
1997	Moscow	Svetlana Khorkina	Yulia Korosteleva	Elena Grosheva
1998	Moscow	Anna Kovaleva	Svetlana Khorkina	Elena Dolgopolova
1999	Moscow	Yelena Produnova	Svetlana Khorkina	Elena Zamolodchikova
2000	Moscow	Yelena Produnova	Elena Zamolodchikova	Yekaterina Lobaznyuk
2002	Moscow	Anna Pavlova	Natalia Ziganshina	Ludmila Ezhova
2003	Moscow	Svetlana Khorkina	Anna Pavlova	Natalia Ziganshina
2004	Moscow	Anna Pavlova	Natalia Ziganshina	Elena Zamolodchikova
2005	Moscow	Yulia Lozhechko	Elena Zamolodchikova	Tatiana Kazantseva
2006	Novosibirsk	Yulia Lozhechko	Darya Elizarova	Svetlana Klyukina
2007	Lobnya	Ksenia Semyonova	Ekaterina Kramarenko	Kristina Pravdina
2009	Bryansk	Aliya Mustafina	Ksenia Semyonova	Tatiana Nabieva
2010	Penza	Viktoria Komova	Ksenia Semyonova	Svetlana Klyukina
2011	Penza	Anna Dementyeva	Anna Pavlova	Alyona Polyan^{(ru)}
2012	Penza	Aliya Mustafina	Ksenia Afanasyeva	Anastasia Grishina
2013	Penza	Aliya Mustafina	Anastasia Grishina	Evgenia Shelgunova
2014	Penza	Aliya Mustafina	Alla Sosnitskaya	Anastasia Grishina
2015	Penza	Maria Kharenkova	Alla Sosnitskaya	Seda Tutkhalyan
2016	Penza	Angelina Melnikova	Seda Tutkhalyan	Maria Kharenkova
2017	Kazan	Natalia Kapitonova	Elena Eremina	Evgenia Shelgunova
2018	Kazan	Angelina Melnikova	Angelina Simakova	Viktoria Komova
2019	Penza	Angelina Simakova	Angelina Melnikova	Aliya Mustafina
2020	Penza	Uliana Perebinosova	Anastasia Kureyeva	Viktoria Trykina
2021	Penza	Viktoria Listunova	Vladislava Urazova	Angelina Melnikova
2022	Kazan	Viktoria Listunova	Maria Minaeva	Vladislava Urazova
2023	Kazan	Viktoria Listunova	Angelina Melnikova	Uliana Perebinosova
2024	Sochi	Angelina Melnikova	Lyudmila Roshchina	Viktoria Listunova
2025	Sirius	Angelina Melnikova	Lyudmila Roshchina	Maria Agafonova
2026	Kaluga	Anna Kalmykova	Lyudmila Roshchina	Alena Glotova

==== Vault ====
Year	Location	Gold	Silver	Bronze
2015	Penza	Alla Sosnitskaya	Maria Paseka	Seda Tutkhalyan
2016	Penza	Seda Tutkhalyan	Tatiana Nabieva	Anastasia Dmitrieva
2017	Kazan	Seda Tutkhalyan	Lilia Akhaimova	Angelina Melnikova
2018	Kazan	Viktoria Trykina	Angelina Melnikova	Tatiana Nabieva
2019	Penza	Maria Paseka	Angelina Melnikova	Tatiana Nabieva
2020	Penza	Tatiana Nabieva	Viktoria Trykina	Alexandra Mayzel
2021	Penza	Angelina Melnikova	Viktoria Listunova	Julia Biryulya
2022	Kazan	Viktoria Listunova	Eleonora Afanasyeva	Julia Biryulya
2023	Kazan	Viktoria Listunova	Eleonora Afanasyeva	Yulia Biryulya
2024	Sochi	Angelina Melnikova	Eleonora Afanasyeva	Yulia Biryulya
2025	Sirius	Anna Kalmykova	Angelina Melnikova	Elizaveta Us
2026	Kaluga	Aleksandra Anufrieva	Liudmila Roshchina	Elizaveta Us

==== Uneven Bars ====
Year	Location	Gold	Silver	Bronze
2015	Penza	Daria Spiridonova	Ekaterina Kramarenko	Maria Paseka
2016	Penza	Daria Skrypnik; Daria Spiridonova	N/A	Aliya Mustafina
2017	Kazan	Natalia Kapitonova; Daria Spiridonova	N/A	Daria Skrypnik
2018	Kazan	Angelina Melnikova	Irina Alexeeva	Viktoria Komova
2019	Penza	Anastasia Ilyankova	Anastasia Agafonova	Angelina Melnikova
2020	Penza	Anastasia Ilyankova	Uliana Perebinosova	Irina Komnova
2021	Penza	Vladislava Urazova	Viktoria Listunova	Angelina Melnikova
2022	Kazan	Uliana Perebinosova	Arina Semukhina	Vladislava Urazova
2023	Kazan	Viktoria Listunova	Uliana Perebinosova	Yana Vorona
2024	Sochi	Lyudmila Roshchina	Viktoria Listunova	Angelina Melnikova
2025	Sirius	Angelina Melnikova	Viktoria Listunova	Lyudmila Roshchina
2026	Kaluga	Lyudmila Roshchina	Anna Kalmykova	Leila Vasileva

==== Balance beam ====
Year	Location	Gold	Silver	Bronze
2015	Penza	Maria Kharenkova	Daria Spiridonova	Seda Tutkhalyan
2016	Penza	Angelina Melnikova	Maria Kharenkova	Aliya Mustafina
2017	Kazan	Seda Tutkhalyan; Viktoria Trykina	N/A	Angelina Melnikova
2018	Kazan	Angelina Melnikova	Ksenia Kamkova	Polina Fedorova
2019	Penza	Angelina Simakova	Angelina Melnikova	Ksenia Klimenko
2020	Penza	Maria Kharenkova	Elena Eremina	Uliana Perebinosova Viktoria Trykina
2021	Penza	Viktoria Listunova	Elena Gerasimova	Viktoria Trykina
2022	Kazan	Elena Gerasimova	Vladislava Urazova	Yana Vorona
2023	Kazan	Yana Vorona	Elena Gerasimova	Alyona Glotova
2024	Sochi	Angelina Melnikova	Elena Gerasimova	Kristina Shapovalova
2025	Sirius	Anna Kalmykova	Kristina Shapovalova	Lyudmila Roshchina
2026	Kaluga	Anna Kalmykova	Liudmila Roshchina	Elizaveta Us

==== Floor ====
Year	Location	Gold	Silver	Bronze
2016	Penza	Ksenia Afanasyeva	Evgeniya Shelgunova	Maria Kharenkova
2017	Kazan	Lilia Akhaimova	Elena Eremina	Seda Tutkhalyan
2018	Kazan	Angelina Melnikova	Angelina Simakova	Irina Alexeeva
2019	Penza	Angelina Melnikova	Lilia Akhaimova	Aliya Mustafina
2020	Penza	Uliana Perebinosova	Anastasia Kureyeva	Yulia Birulya
2021	Penza	Angelina Melnikova	Viktoria Listunova	Vladislava Urazova
2022	Kazan	Viktoria Listunova	Maria Agafonova	Alyona Glotova
2023	Kazan	Viktoria Listunova	Yana Vorona	Leila Vasileva
2024	Sochi	Angelina Melnikova	Viktoria Listunova	Leila Vasileva
2025	Sirius	Angelina Melnikova	Anna Kalmykova	Maria Agafonova
2026	Kaluga	Liudmila Roshchina	Anna Kalmykova	Aleksandra Anufrieva

=== Men ===
==== All-around ====
Year	Location	Gold	Silver	Bronze
1993	Moscow	Sergey Kharkov	Yevgeny Shabaev	Yevgeny Zhukov
1994	Voronezh	Yevgeny Shabaev	Sergey Kharkov	Dmitri Vasilenko
1995	Moscow	Dimitri Karbanenko	Yevgeny Shabaev	Alexei Nemov
1996	Moscow	Alexei Nemov	Dimitri Karbanenko	Aleksey Voropayev
1997	Moscow	Alexei Bondarenko	Dmitri Vasilenko	Yuri Kryukov
1998	Moscow	Alexei Bondarenko	Yuri Kryukov	Alexei Sivaklokov
1999	Moscow	Yevgeni Podgorny	Maxim Aleshin	Nikolai Kryukov
2000	Moscow	Maxim Aleshin	Yevgeni Podgorny	Yuri Kryukov
2002	Moscow	Yevgeni Podgorny	Alexei Bondarenko	Yevgeny Krylov
2003	Moscow	Yuri Tikhanovski	Nikolai Kryukov	Yevgeny Krylov
2004	Moscow	Alexei Bondarenko	Anton Golotsutskov	Georgi Grebenkov
2005	Moscow	Anton Golotsutskov	Yuri Kryukov	Sergei Khorokhordin
2006	Novosibirsk	Sergei Khorokhordin	Maksim Deviatovski	Anton Golotsutskov
2007	Lobnya	Maksim Deviatovski	Yuri Ryazanov	Ruslan Nigmadzyanov
2009	Bryansk	Yuri Ryazanov	Vladimir Olennikov	Dmitry Barkalov
2010	Penza	Dmitry Barkalov	Dmitry Gogotov	Andrey Cherkasov
2011	Penza	Maksim Deviatovski	Pavel Russinyak	Nikita Ignatyev
2012	Penza	Nikita Ignatyev	Emin Garibov	Igor Pakhomenko
2013	Penza	David Belyavskiy	Nikita Ignatyev	Dmitry Stolyarov
2014	Penza	David Belyavskiy	Nikita Ignatyev	Nikita Lezhankin
2015	Penza	David Belyavskiy	Nikolai Kuksenkov	Nikita Ignatyev
2016	Penza	Nikolai Kuksenkov	Nikita Nagornyy	David Belyavskiy
2017	Kazan	Artur Dalaloyan	Nikita Ignatyev	Vladislav Polyashov
2018	Kazan	Artur Dalaloyan	David Belyavskiy	Vladislav Polyashov
2019	Penza	Nikita Nagornyy	Vladislav Polyashov	Nikita Ignatyev
2020	Penza	Aleksandr Kartsev	Viktor Britan	Artem Pleshkin
2021	Penza	Aleksandr Kartsev	Artur Dalaloyan	David Belyavskiy
2026	Kaluga	Arsenii Dukhno	Savelii Sieedin	Ivan Kuliak
