= 2010 Russian Artistic Gymnastics Championships =

Gymnastics competition in Russia

Russian Artistic Gymnastics Championships
- Venue: Burtases Gymnastics Centre
- Location: Penza, Russia
- Date: March 1–14, 2010

The 2010 Russian Artistic Gymnastics Championships was held in Penza, Russia, at the Burtases Gymnastics Centre between 1–14 March 2010.

== Medalists ==
Event	Gold	Silver	Bronze
Men
Team	Moscow; Vladimir Olennikov; Dmitri Gogotov; Emin Garibov; Dmitry Stolyarov; Mikhail Bodnar; Denis Ablyazin	Urals Federal District; Aleksandr Dyomin; Denis Ulgin; Semyon Eryomin; Mikhail Kudashov; Anton Lobachev; David Belyavskiy	Central Federal District; Dmitry Barkalov; Timur Kuzmin; Ruslan Nigmadzyanov; Anton Neudakin; Andrey Perevoznikov; Matvei Petrov
All-Around	Dmitry Barkalov	Dmitry Gogotov	Andrey Cherkasov
Floor	Dmitry Barkalov	Anton Lobachev	Andrei Likhovitsky
Pommel horse	Matvei Petrov	Andrey Perevoznikov	Andrei Likhovitsky
Rings	Aleksandr Balandin	Konstantin Pluzhnikov	Dmitry Barkalov
Vault	Anton Golotsutskov	David Belyavskiy	Denis Ablyazin
Parallel bars	Andrei Likhovitsky	Emin Garibov	David Belyavskiy
Horizontal bar	Mikhail Bodnar	Igor Pakhomenko	Anatoly Vasilyev
Women
Team	Central Federal District; Yulia Lozhechko; Viktoria Komova; Ksenia Semyonova; Ksenia Afanasyeva; Anna Pavlova; Yulia Inshina	Moscow; Ekaterina Kurbatova; Anna Myzdrikova; Anastasia Novikova; Maria Chibiskova; Aliya Mustafina; Elena Syrnikova	Saint Petersburg; Ekaterina Kramarenko; Irina Sazonova; Tatiana Nabieva; Olga Zemskova; Diana Sapronova; Alina Rybalova
All-Around	Viktoria Komova	Ksenia Semyonova	Svetlana Klyukina
Vault	Anna Myzdrikova	Ekaterina Kurbatova	Tatiana Nabieva
Uneven Bars	Tatiana Nabieva	Viktoria Komova	Ekaterina Kurbatova
Balance Beam	Ksenia Semyonova	Svetlana Klyukina	Ksenia Afanasyeva
Floor Exercise	Anna Myzdrikova	Ksenia Semyonova	Ramilya Musina
Junior
Team	Central Federal District	Saint Petersburg	Moscow
All-Around	MS:Maria Paseka; CMS:Anastasia Grishina	MS:Violetta Malikova; CMS:Anastasia Sidorova	MS:Kristina Kruglikova; CMS:Anna Rodionova
Vault	MS:Maria Paseka; CMS:Anastasia Sidorova	MS:Violetta Malikova; CMS:Sofia Bramman	MS:Yulia Belokobylskaya; CMS:Anna Rodionova
Uneven Bars	MS:Maria Paseka; CMS:Anastasia Grishina	MS:Yulia Belokobylskaya; CMS:Anna Rodionova	MS:Maria Stepanova; CMS:Kristina Sidorova
Balance Beam	MS:Violetta Malikova; CMS:Anastasia Grishina	MS:Kristina Kruglikova; CMS:Anastasia Sidorova	MS:Maria Paseka; CMS:Arina Matrosova
Floor Exercise	MS:Yulia Belokobylskaya; CMS:Anastasia Sidorova	MS:Maria Paseka; CMS:Anastasia Grishina	MS:Maria Smirnova; CMS:Ekaterina Baturina

== Men's results ==
=== Senior Team Final ===
Rank	Team	Floor (gymnastics)	Pommel horse	Rings (gymnastics)	Vault (gymnastics)	Parallel bars	Horizontal bar	Total
1st place, gold medalist(s)	Moscow	43.150	43.800	42.650	47.750	43.900	42.150	263.400
1st place, gold medalist(s)	Vladimir Olennikov		14.900	14.450	15.500			263.400
1st place, gold medalist(s)	Dmitry Gogotov	14.500	14.000			14.950	14.200	263.400
1st place, gold medalist(s)	Emin Garibov	14.050		14.400		14.600	13.750	263.400
1st place, gold medalist(s)	Dmitry Stolyarov		14.900			14.350		263.400
1st place, gold medalist(s)	Mikhail Bodnar			13.800	16.200		14.200	263.400
1st place, gold medalist(s)	Denis Ablyazin	14.600			16.000			263.400
2nd place, silver medalist(s)	Urals Federal District	43.900	40.950	41.800	47.000	41.900	41.550	265.953
2nd place, silver medalist(s)	Aleksandr Dyomin	14.600		13.850	15.550	13.700	13.800	265.953
2nd place, silver medalist(s)	Denis Ulgin							265.953
2nd place, silver medalist(s)	Semyon Eryomin		13.400	13.700				265.953
2nd place, silver medalist(s)	Mikhail Kudashov							265.953
2nd place, silver medalist(s)	Anton Lobachev	14.950	13.950	14.250	15.450	13.300	13.500	265.953
2nd place, silver medalist(s)	David Belyavskiy	14.350	13.600		16.000	14.900	14.250	265.953
3rd place, bronze medalist(s)	Central Federal District	41.750	41.300	43.600	46.450	41.550	41.350	256.000
3rd place, bronze medalist(s)	Dmitry Barkalov	14.500	11.800	15.000	15.700	14.050	14.650	256.000
3rd place, bronze medalist(s)	Timur Kuzmin						13.800	256.000
3rd place, bronze medalist(s)	Ruslan Nigmadzyanov	13.450		14.350	15.250	13.250		256.000
3rd place, bronze medalist(s)	Anton Neudakin	13.800			15.500			256.000
3rd place, bronze medalist(s)	Andrey Perevoznikov		15.100					256.000
3rd place, bronze medalist(s)	Matvei Petrov		14.350	14.250		14.250	12.900	256.000

=== Senior Floor Exercise Final ===
Rank	Gymnast	Represent	Total
1st place, gold medalist(s)	Dmitry Barkalov	Vladimir	14.800
2nd place, silver medalist(s)	Anton Lobachev	Yekaterinburg	14.700
3rd place, bronze medalist(s)	Andrei Likhovitsky	Rostov-on-Don	14.300
4	Anton Golotsutskov	Seversk	14.250
5	Aleksandr Dyomin	Khimki	14.150
6	Andrey Sovenko	Rostov-on-Don	13.950
7	Dmitry Gogotov	Moscow	13.900
8	Denis Ablyazin	Penza / Moscow	13.800

=== Senior Pommel Horse Final ===
Rank	Gymnast	Represent	Total
1st place, gold medalist(s)	Matvei Petrov	Khimki	15.500
2nd place, silver medalist(s)	Andrey Perevoznikov	Korolev	15.100
3rd place, bronze medalist(s)	Andrei Likhovitsky	Rostov-on-Don	14.600
4	Anton Golotsutskov	Seversk	13.450
5	Vladimir Olennikov	Moscow	13.000
6	Dmitry Gogotov	Moscow	12.300
7	Dmitry Barkalov	Vladimir	12.150
8	Igor Pakhomenko	Leninsk-Kuznetsky	11.900

=== Senior Still Rings Final ===
Rank	Gymnast	Represent	Total
1st place, gold medalist(s)	Aleksandr Balandin	Petrozavodsk	16.000
2nd place, silver medalist(s)	Konstantin Pluzhnikov	Seversk	15.700
3rd place, bronze medalist(s)	Dmitry Barkalov	Vladimir	14.850
4	Vladimir Olennikov	Moscow	14.500
5	Mikhail Bodnar	Moscow	14.350
6	Matvei Petrov	Khimki	13.850
7	Ruslan Nigmadzyanov	Vladimir	13.850

=== Senior Vault Final ===
Rank	Gymnast	Represent	Total
1st place, gold medalist(s)	Anton Golotsutskov	Seversk	15.750
2nd place, silver medalist(s)	David Belyavskiy	Yekaterinburg	15.525
3rd place, bronze medalist(s)	Denis Ablyazin	Penza / Moscow	14.850
4	Anatoly Vasilyev	Cheboksary	15.250
5	Mikhail Bodnar	Moscow	15.075
6	Mikhail Kudashov	Chelyabinsk	15.025
7	Roman Yuvanen	Petrozavodsk	14.825
8	Alexei Bykov	Volgograd	14.050

=== Senior Parallel Bars Final ===
Rank	Gymnast	Represent	Total
1st place, gold medalist(s)	Andrei Likhovitsky	Rostov-on-Don	14.750
2nd place, silver medalist(s)	Emin Garibov	Moscow	14.750
3rd place, bronze medalist(s)	David Belyavskiy	Yekaterinburg	14.700
4	Dmitry Stolyarov	Moscow	14.450
5	Aleksandr Fafashkin	Moscow	13.900
6	Andrey Cherkasov	Leninsk-Kuznetsky	13.800
7	Vladimir Olennikov	Moscow	12.750
8	Konstantin Pluzhnikov	Seversk	11.900

=== Senior Horizontal Bars Final ===
Rank	Gymnast	Represent	Total
1st place, gold medalist(s)	Mikhail Bodnar	Moscow	14.500
2nd place, silver medalist(s)	Igor Pakhomenko	Leninsk-Kuznetsky	14.250
3rd place, bronze medalist(s)	Anatoly Vasilyev	Cheboksary	13.900
4	Dmitry Gogotov	Moscow	13.750
5	David Belyavskiy	Yekaterinburg	13.900
6	Aleksandr Dyomin	Khimki	13.350
7	Aleksandr Klochkov	Moscow	12.800

== Women's Results ==
=== Senior Team Final ===
Rank	Team	Vault (gymnastics)	Uneven bars	Balance beam	Floor (gymnastics)	Total
1st place, gold medalist(s)	Central Federal District	43.500	44.800	43.375	42.025	173.700
1st place, gold medalist(s)	Yulia Lozhechko					173.700
1st place, gold medalist(s)	Viktoria Komova	14.900	16.450	15.275	14.075	173.700
1st place, gold medalist(s)	Ksenia Semyonova	13.950	14.800	14.475	14.175	173.700
1st place, gold medalist(s)	Ksenia Afanasyeva					173.700
1st place, gold medalist(s)	Yulia Inshina		13.550	13.625	13.775	173.700
1st place, gold medalist(s)	Anna Pavlova	14.650				173.700
2nd place, silver medalist(s)	Moscow	43.200	42.100	40.375	42.000	167.675
2nd place, silver medalist(s)	Ekaterina Kurbatova	14.775	15.625	14.250	14.450	167.675
2nd place, silver medalist(s)	Aliya Mustafina					167.675
2nd place, silver medalist(s)	Anna Myzdrikova	14.625		13.650	13.825	167.675
2nd place, silver medalist(s)	Anastasia Novikova		14.350			167.675
2nd place, silver medalist(s)	Maria Chibiskova	13.800	12.125	12.475	13.725	167.675
2nd place, silver medalist(s)	Elena Syrnikova					167.675
3rd place, bronze medalist(s)	Saint Petersburg	41.875	40.926	39.825	38.750	161.375
3rd place, bronze medalist(s)	Ekaterina Kramarenko	13.900	13.400	14.125	12.875	161.375
3rd place, bronze medalist(s)	Irina Sazonova	13.175		12.425	13.700	161.375
3rd place, bronze medalist(s)	Tatiana Nabieva	14.800	16.125			161.375
3rd place, bronze medalist(s)	Olga Zemskova					161.375
3rd place, bronze medalist(s)	Diana Sapronova		11.400	13.275		161.375
3rd place, bronze medalist(s)	Alina Rybalova	12.175				161.375
4	Northwestern Federal District	40.825	45.375	38.625	38.225	153.050
4	Svetlana Klyukina	14.275	13.750	14.250	13.700	153.050
4	Svetlana Vlasova	13.625	10.575	11.825		153.050
4	Elizaveta Glukhova	12.900			12.450	153.050
4	Alyona Cheboksarova		11.050			153.050
4	Anna Ekimovskaya			12.550	12.075	153.050
4	Viktoria Ratnikova					153.050
5	Volga Federal District	40.350	36.950	37.175	35/750	150.225
5	Anna Dementyeva		13.900			150.225
5	Aleksandra Telitsyna	13.700		11.725	10.900	150.225
5	Ekaterina Skorodumova	13.700		12.450	12.600	150.225
5	Olga Bikmurzina	12.950	11.775		12.250	150.225
5	Ksenia Nikiforova		11.275	13.000		150.225
5	Tatiana Arkhipova					150.225
6	Urals Federal District	38.625	32.525	32.900	35.750	139.800
6	Ekaterina Vukolova	13.600	11.225	10.225	10.950	139.800
6	Albina Abacharaeva					139.800
6	Violetta Shanina	12.200	11.100	11.900		139.800
6	Ekaterina Eroshenkova	12.825		10.775	12.200	139.800
6	Elena Sedova		10.200		12.600	139.800

=== Senior All-Around Final ===
Rank	Gymnast	Team	Vault (gymnastics)	Uneven bars	Balance beam	Floor (gymnastics)	Total
1st place, gold medalist(s)	Viktoria Komova	Voronezh	14.550	16.225	15.425	14.675	60.875
2nd place, silver medalist(s)	Ksenia Semyonova	Khimki / Tula	14.400	14.400	14.675	14.425	57.900
3rd place, bronze medalist(s)	Svetlana Klyukina	Severodvinsk	14.100	13.950	14.125	13.700	55.875
4	Ekaterina Kramarenko	Saint Petersburg	13.925	14.500	13.450	13.375	55.250
5	Ramilya Musina	Surgut	14.325	12.325	13.975	14.450	55.075
6	Yulia Inshina	Voronezh	13.450	13.750	14.250	13.725	54.975
7	Anastasia Novikova	Moscow	13.975	13.950	13.525	13.200	54.650
8	Ekaterina Kurbatova	Moscow	14.600	13.325	12.675	13.950	54.550
9	Darya Elizarova	Tula	13.525	13.075	13.800	13.800	54.200
10	Anna Pavlova	Moscow	14.900	13.150	13.250	12.500	53.800
11	Anna Myzdrikova	Moscow	14.275	11.350	13.225	14.900	53.750
12	Diana Sapronova	Saint Peterburg	13.325	13.700	13.550	12.400	52.975
13	Irina Sazonova	Saint Peterburg	13.325	13.000	12.525	14.075	52.925
14	Yulia Lozhechko	Bryansk	12.825	13.150	13.150	13.525	52.650
15	Maria Chibiskova	Moscow	13.725	12.525	12.025	13.800	52.075
16	Ekaterina Skorodumova	Ulyanovsk	13.500	10.825	12.600	12.925	49.850
17	Olga Bikmurzina	Mordovia	12.975	11.775	11.750	13.100	49.600
18	Aleksandra Telitsyna	Mari El	13.650	10.525	12.450	12.800	49.425
19	Alina Rybalova	Saint Peterburg	12.575	11.475	11.925	13.050	49.025
20	Elena Syrnikova	Moscow	12.325	11.925	12.000	12.675	48.925
21	Olga Zemskova	Saint Peterburg	12.775	10.675	13.125	12.325	48.900
22	Anna Ekimovskaya	Arkhangelsk	12.475	10.500	12.725	12.350	48.050
23	Ksenia Nikiforova	Perm	12.700	11.225	12.425	11.275	47.625
24	Ekaterina Vukolova	Krasnodar	13.450	9.900	11.775	12.150	47.275

=== Senior Vault Final ===
Rank	Gymnast	Represent	Total
1st place, gold medalist(s)	Anna Myzdrikova	Moscow	14.550
2nd place, silver medalist(s)	Ekaterina Kurbatova	Moscow	14.338
3rd place, bronze medalist(s)	Tatiana Nabieva	Saint Petersburg	14.338
4	Ramilya Musina	Surgut	14.238
5	Anna Pavlova	Moscow	13.738
6	Aleksandra Telitsyna	Yoshkar-Ola	13.713
7	Maria Chibiskova	Moscow	13.450
8	Ekaterina Vukolova	Armavir	12.888

=== Senior Uneven Bars Final ===
Rank	Gymnast	Represent	Total
1st place, gold medalist(s)	Tatiana Nabieva	Saint Petersburg	15.150
2nd place, silver medalist(s)	Viktoria Komova	Voronezh	14.600
3rd place, bronze medalist(s)	Ekaterina Kurbatova	Moscow	14.500
4	Yulia Inshina	Voronezh	13.575
5	Ksenia Semyonova	Khimki / Tula	13.250
6	Anna Dementyeva	Khimki / Samara	12.975
7	Ekaterina Kramarenko	Saint Petersburg	12.750
8	Diana Sapronova	Saint Petersburg	12.150

=== Senior Balance Beam Final ===
Rank	Gymnast	Represent	Total
1st place, gold medalist(s)	Ksenia Semyonova	Khimki / Tula	14.500
2nd place, silver medalist(s)	Svetlana Klyukina	Severodvinsk	14.425
3rd place, bronze medalist(s)	Ksenia Afanasyeva	Khimki / Tula	14.275
4	Ramilya Musina	Surgut	14.175
5	Diana Sapronova	Saint Peterburg	13.875
6	Yulia Inshina	Voronezh	13.100
7	Anastasia Novikova	Moscow	12.875
8	Darya Elizarova	Tula	11.225

=== Senior Floor Exercise Final ===
Rank	Gymnast	Represent	Total
1st place, gold medalist(s)	Anna Myzdrikova	Moscow	14.775
2nd place, silver medalist(s)	Ksenia Semyonova	Khimki / Tula	14.175
3rd place, bronze medalist(s)	Ramilya Musina	Surgut	14.150
4	Ekaterina Kurbatova	Moscow	13.850
5	Irina Sazonova	Saint Petersburg	13.425
6	Maria Chibiskova	Moscow	13.075
7	Darya Elizarova	Tula	12.850
8	Svetlana Klyukina	Severodvinsk	12.250
