= 2008 European Artistic Gymnastics Championships =

2008 European Artistic Gymnastics Championships may refer to:

- 2008 European Men's Artistic Gymnastics Championships held from 8 to 11 May in Lausanne
- 2008 European Women's Artistic Gymnastics Championships held from 3 to 6 April in Clermont-Ferrand
