= Blanik (disambiguation) =

Blaník is a mountain and a protected landscape area in the Czech Republic.

Blanik or Blaník may also refer to:

- LET L-13 Blaník, a sailplane produced by Let Kunovice
- 7498 Blaník, an asteroid
- Leszek Blanik, Polish gymnast
  - Blanik (vault), double front vault first performed by Blanik, named after him
- Blaník, the last work of Má vlast by Bedřich Smetana
