= List of Olympic male artistic gymnasts for Russia =

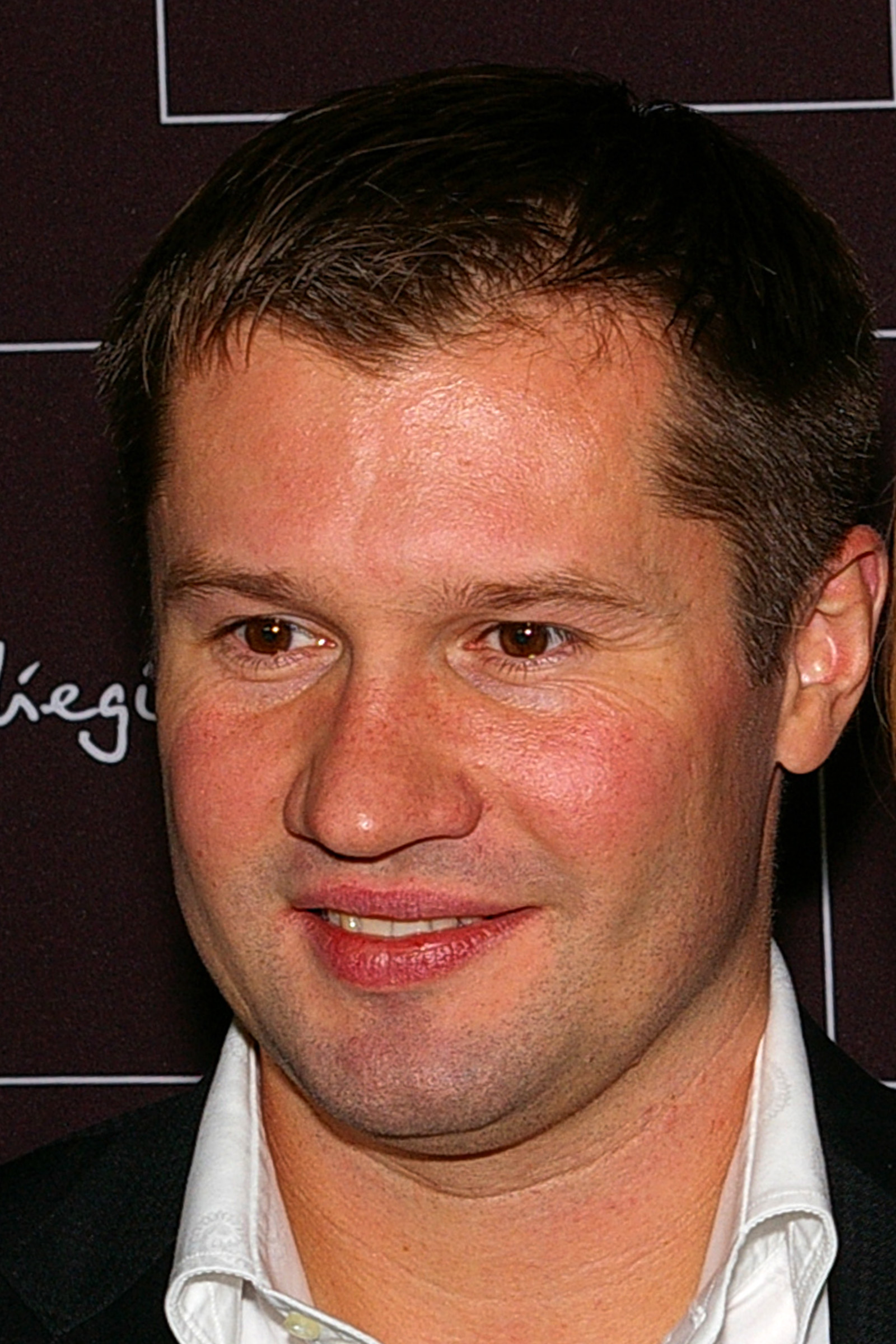
Alexei Nemov

Russian male artistic gymnasts have competed at every Olympic Games between 1996–2020. They did not participate at the 2024 Olympic Games due to them being banned as a team and refusing to participate as individual neutral athletes.

== Gymnasts ==
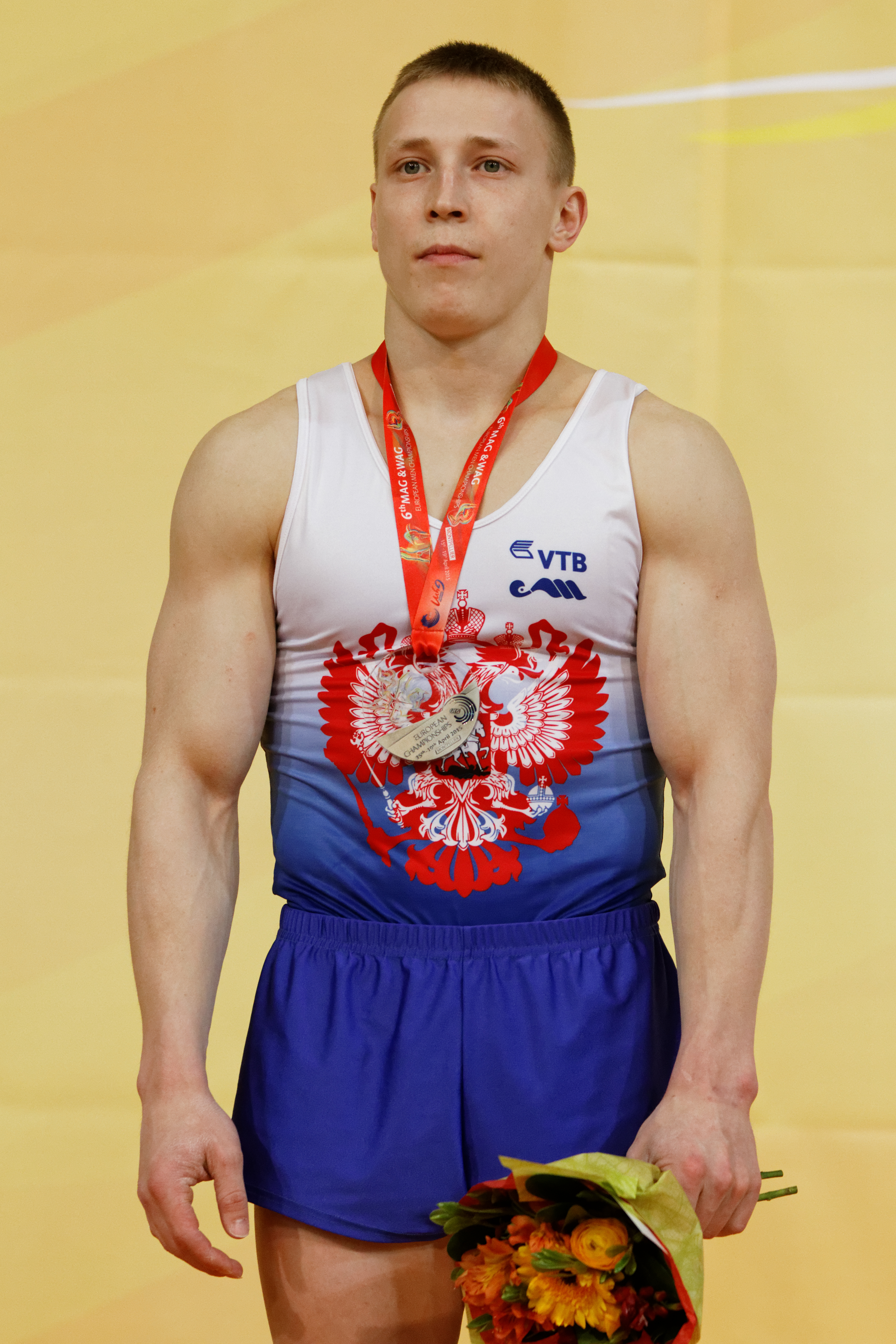
Denis Ablyazin

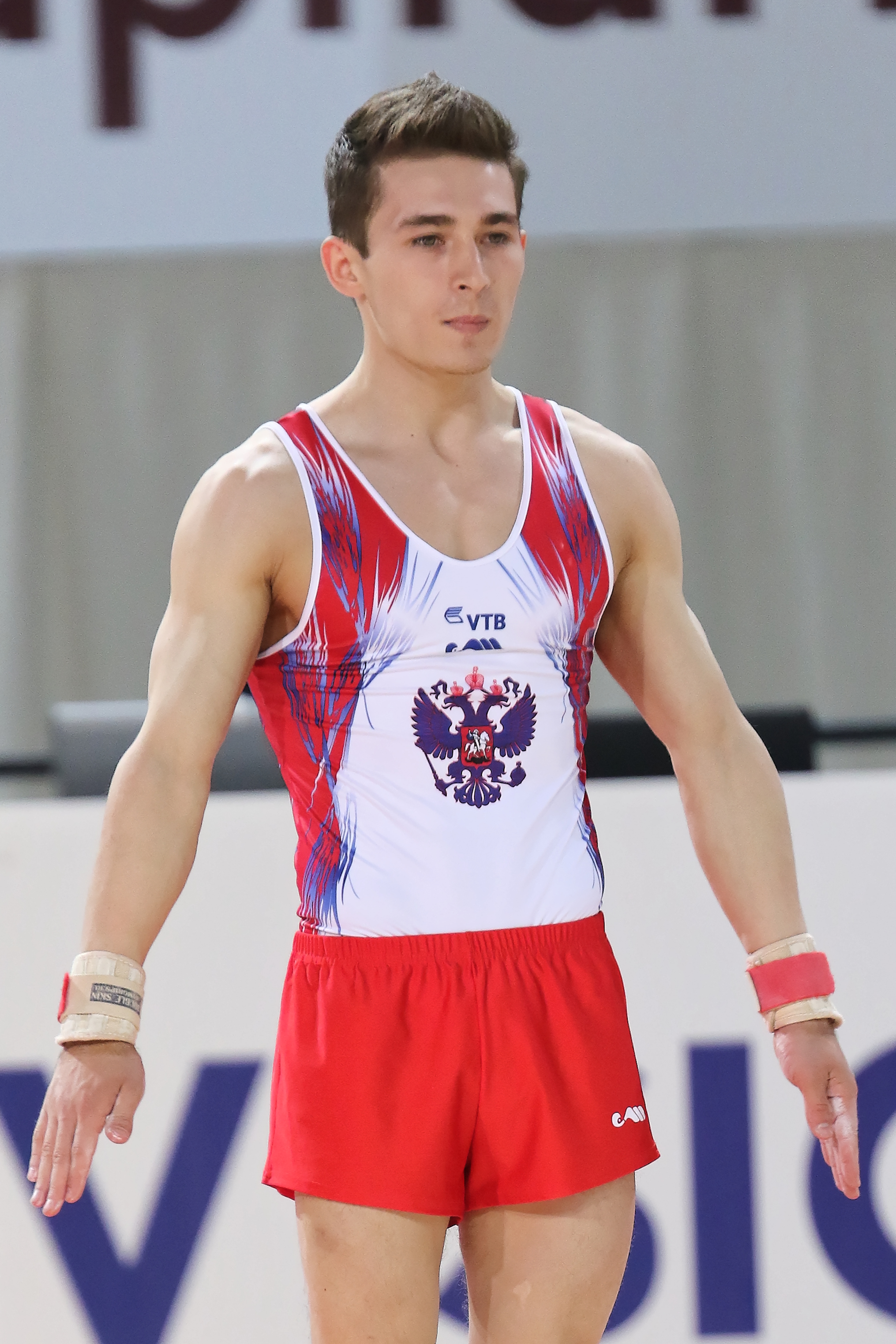
David Belyavskiy

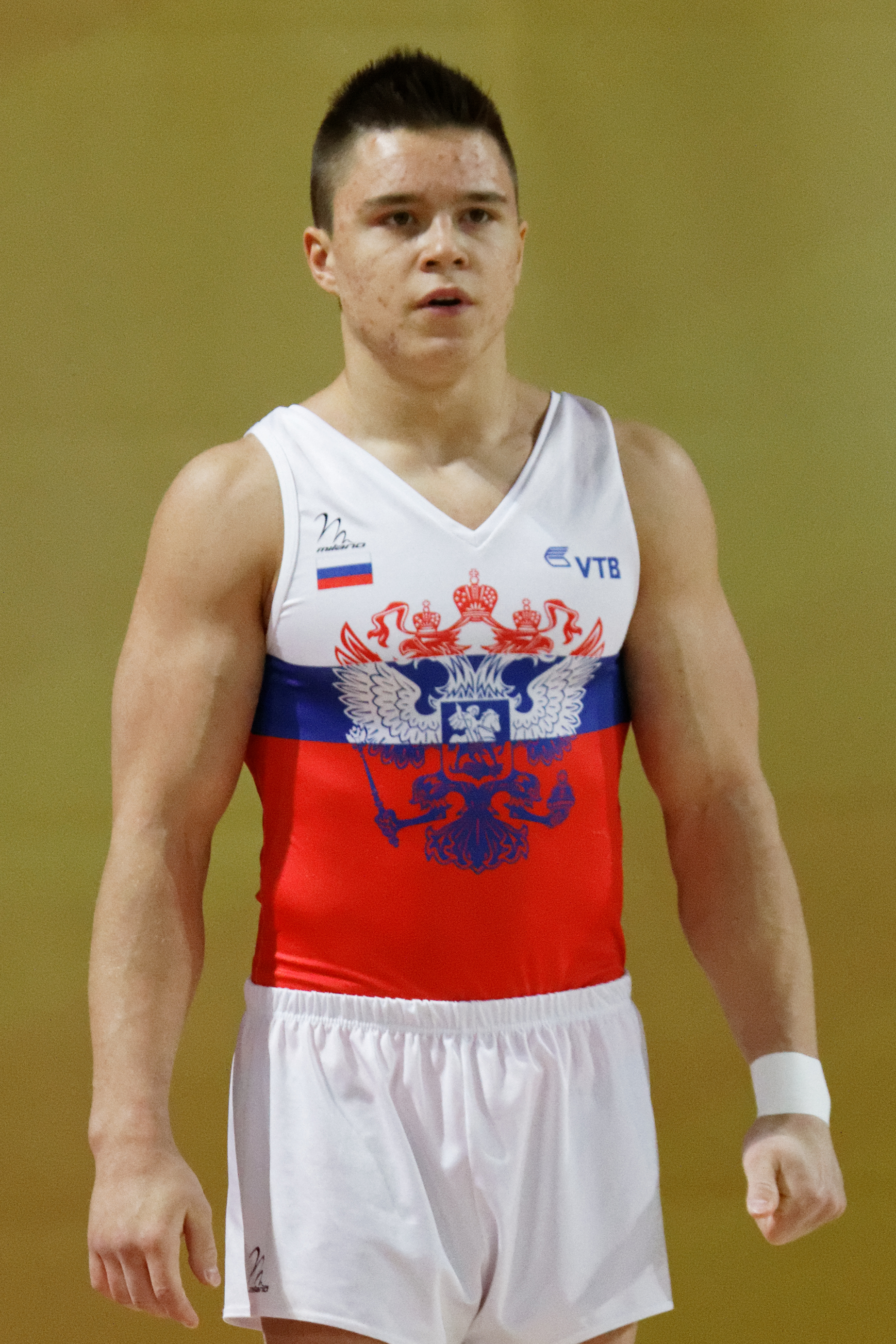
Nikita Nagornyy

Note: The following only counts medals won by gymnasts when they represented Russia or the Russian Olympic Committee (Not the Unified Team or the Soviet Union). Example: Aleksey Voropayev won a gold medal with the Unified Team in 1992, but only the gold medal he won in 1996 appears here.

Gymnast	Years	Gold	Silver	Bronze	Total medals	Ref.
Denis Ablyazin	2012, 2016, 2020	1	4	2	7	
Maxim Aleshin	2000	0	0	1	1	
Aleksandr Balandin	2012	0	0	0	0	
David Belyavskiy	2012, 2016, 2020	1	1	1	3	
Alexei Bondarenko	2000, 2004	0	1	1	2	
Artur Dalaloyan	2020	1	0	0	1	
Maksim Devyatovskiy	2004, 2008	0	0	0	0	
Dmitri Drevin	2000	0	0	1	1	
Emin Garibov	2012	0	0	0	0	
Anton Golotsutskov	2004, 2008	0	0	2	2	
Georgy Grebenkov	2004	0	0	0	0	
Aleksandr Kartsev	2020	0	0	0	0	
Sergey Kharkov	1996	1	0	0	1	
Sergey Khorokhordin	2008	0	0	0	0	
Nikolai Kuksenkov	2016	0	1	0	1	
Nikolai Kryukov	1996, 2000, 2008	1	0	1	2	
Nikita Nagornyy	2016, 2020	1	1	2	4	
Alexei Nemov	1996, 2000, 2004	4	2	6	12	
Igor Pakhomenko	2012	0	0	0	0	
Konstantin Pluzhnikov	2008	0	0	0	0	
Yevgeni Podgorny	1996, 2000	1	0	1	2	
Vladislav Polyashov	2020	0	0	0	0	
Yuri Ryazanov	2008	0	0	0	0	
Aleksandr Safoshkin	2004	0	0	0	0	
Ivan Stretovich	2016	0	1	0	1	
Dmitri Trush	1996	1	0	0	1	
Dmitri Vasilenko	1996	1	0	0	1	
Aleksey Voropayev	1996	1	0	0	1	

== Medalists ==
Medal	Name	Year	Event
Gold	Kharkov, Kryukov, Nemov, Podgorny, Trush, Vasilenko, Voropaev	(United States) 1996 Atlanta	Men's team
Silver	Alexei Nemov	(United States) 1996 Atlanta	Men's all-around
Bronze	Alexei Nemov	(United States) 1996 Atlanta	Men's floor exercise
Bronze	Alexei Nemov	(United States) 1996 Atlanta	Men's pommel horse
Gold	Alexei Nemov	(United States) 1996 Atlanta	Men's vault
Bronze	Alexei Nemov	(United States) 1996 Atlanta	Men's horizontal bar
Bronze	Aleshin, Bondarenko, Drevin, Kryukov, Nemov, Podgorny	(Australia) 2000 Sydney	Men's team
Gold	Alexei Nemov	(Australia) 2000 Sydney	Men's all-around
Silver	Alexei Nemov	(Australia) 2000 Sydney	Men's floor exercise
Bronze	Alexei Nemov	(Australia) 2000 Sydney	Men's pommel horse
Silver	Alexei Nemov	(Australia) 2000 Sydney	Men's vault
Bronze	Alexei Nemov	(Australia) 2000 Sydney	Men's parallel bars
Gold	Alexei Nemov	(Australia) 2000 Sydney	Men's horizontal bar
Bronze	Anton Golotsutskov	(China) 2008 Beijing	Men's floor exercise
Bronze	Anton Golotsutskov	(China) 2008 Beijing	Men's vault
Silver	Denis Ablyazin	(United Kingdom) 2012 London	Men's floor exercise
Silver	Denis Ablyazin	(United Kingdom) 2012 London	Men's vault
Silver	Ablyazin, Belyavskiy, Stretovich, Kuksenkov, Nagornyy	(Brazil) 2016 Rio de Janeiro	Men's team
Bronze	Denis Ablyazin	(Brazil) 2016 Rio de Janeiro	Men's rings
Silver	Denis Ablyazin	(Brazil) 2016 Rio de Janeiro	Men's vault
Bronze	David Belyavskiy	(Brazil) 2016 Rio de Janeiro	Men's parallel bars
Gold	Ablyazin, Belyavskiy, Dalaloyan, Nagornyy ( ROC)	(Japan) 2020 Tokyo	Men's team
Bronze	Nikita Nagornyy ( ROC)	(Japan) 2020 Tokyo	Men's all-around
Silver	Denis Ablyazin ( ROC)	(Japan) 2020 Tokyo	Men's vault
Bronze	Nikita Nagornyy ( ROC)	(Japan) 2020 Tokyo	Men's horizontal bar

== See also ==
- List of Olympic female artistic gymnasts for Russia
