= Matvei Petrov =

Albanian artistic gymnast

- Матвей Петров
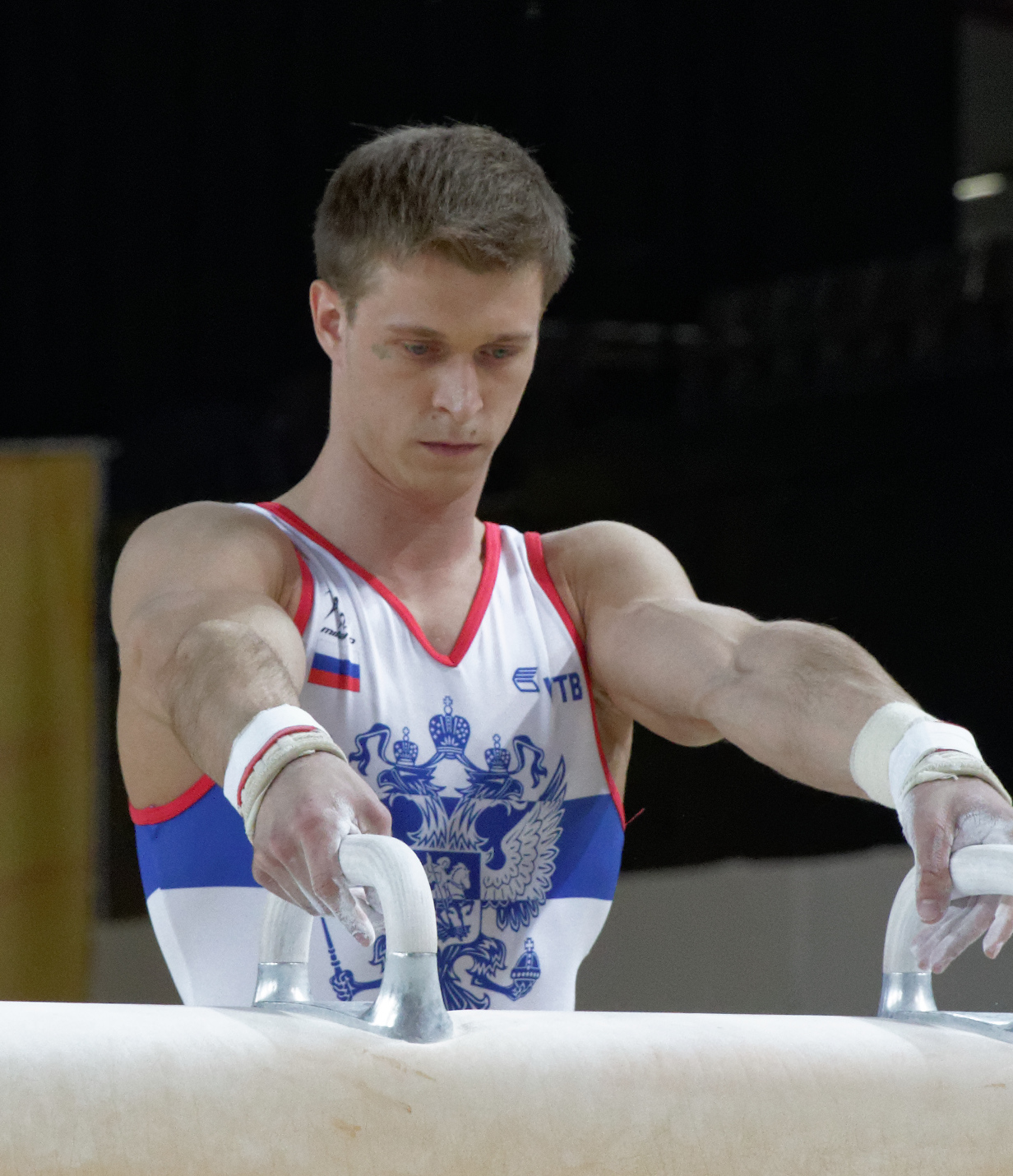
- Petrov at the 2015 European Championships

Personal information
- Full name: Matvei Sergeyevich Petrov
- Alternative name: Matvey Petrov
- Born: 16 July 1990 (age 36) Seltso, Russian SFSR, Soviet Union

Gymnastics career
- Discipline: Men's artistic gymnastics
- Country represented: Albania
- Former countries represented: Russia (until 2018)
- Head coach: Alon Hasa
Medal record
Artistic gymnastics
Representing Albania
European Championships
Gold medal – first place	2020 Mersin	Pommel horse
Event / 1st / 2nd / 3rd; FIG World Challenge Cup / 4 / 1 / 2
Representing Russia
Event / 1st / 2nd / 3rd; FIG World Cup / 0 / 0 / 1

Matvei Sergeyevich Petrov (Russian: Матвей Сергеевич Петров; born 16 July 1990) is a Russian and Albanian artistic gymnast. He is the 2020 European Champion on the pommel horse, and he is Albania's first European medalist. He represented Albania at the 2020 Summer Olympics and was the first reserve for the pommel horse final after finishing tenth in the qualification round.

== Early life ==
Petrov was born on 16 July 1990 in the small town Seltso, but his family moved to Kaliningrad after he was born.

== Gymnastics career ==
=== Representing Russia (2006–2016) ===
Petrov competed at the 2006 Junior European Championships and won three medals. He helped the Russian team win the silver medal three-tenths of a point behind Germany. He also won the silver medal on the pommel horse behind British gymnast Louis Smith, and he won the bronze medal on the horizontal bar. He then won three more medals at the 2008 Junior European Championships. The Russian team won the silver medal behind Great Britain. Individually, Petrov won another silver medal on the pommel horse behind Daniel Keatings, and he won the bronze medal on the still rings.

At the 2010 Russian Championships, Petrov won the gold medal on the pommel horse and the bronze medal with the Central Federal District team. Then at the 2010 Cottbus World Cup, he won the bronze medal on the pommel horse behind Sašo Bertoncelj and Koki Sakamoto.

At the 2013 European Championships, Petrov finished thirteenth on the pommel horse in the qualification round. He was selected to compete at the 2013 World Championships, and he qualified for the pommel horse event final where he finished seventh. At the 2015 European Championships, he finished eighth in the pommel horse final.

==== Nationality change ====
Petrov initially retired from gymnastics after not being selected for the 2016 Russian Olympic team. He then moved to Prague to work as a coach, but he began training again in his spare time. The director of the gym he was working at, Alon Hasa, is Albanian, and he began coaching Petrov as well. The Artistic Gymnastics Federation of Russia approved Petrov's switch to Albania, and he began competing for Albania in 2018.

=== Representing Albania (2018–present) ===
Petrov made his debut for Albania at the 2018 Grand Prix of Brno, a mixed-pairs team competition where he won the gold medal with Dutch teammate Neto Tanishaley. At the 2018 Voronin Cup in Moscow, he won the bronze medal on the pommel horse. He only competed on the pommel horse at the 2019 European Championships and finished thirtieth in the qualification round. Then he competed in the all-around at the 2019 World Championships and finished ninety-seventh with a total score of 75.656 and did not qualify for any finals.

In October 2020, Petrov competed at the Szombathely World Challenge Cup and won the bronze medal on the pommel horse behind Nariman Kurbanov and Robert Seligman, and he finished sixth on the parallel bars. Then in December, he won the gold medal on the pommel horse at the 2020 European Championships with a score of 14.566. This is Albania's first medal as well as the first gold medal at the European Men's Artistic Gymnastics Championships.

At the 2021 European Championships in Basel, Petrov finished twentieth on the pommel horse in the qualification round and did not qualify for the final. Then at the 2021 Varna World Challenge Cup, he finished seventh in the pommel horse final. He then won the gold medal on the pommel horse at the 2021 Osijek World Challenge Cup. Then at the Doha World Cup, he finished eighth in the pommel horse final. Petrov received an invitation from the Tripartite Commission to compete at the 2020 Olympic Games. He only competed on the pommel horse where he finished tenth in the qualification round with a score of 14.733 which made him the first reserve for the event final. After the Olympics, he competed at the Koper World Challenge Cup and won the gold medal on the pommel horse after winning the execution score tie-breaker over Illia Kovtun.

He represented Albania at the 2022 Mediterranean Games held in Oran, Algeria.

== See also ==
- Nationality changes in gymnastics
