= Robert Stănescu =

Romanian artistic gymnast

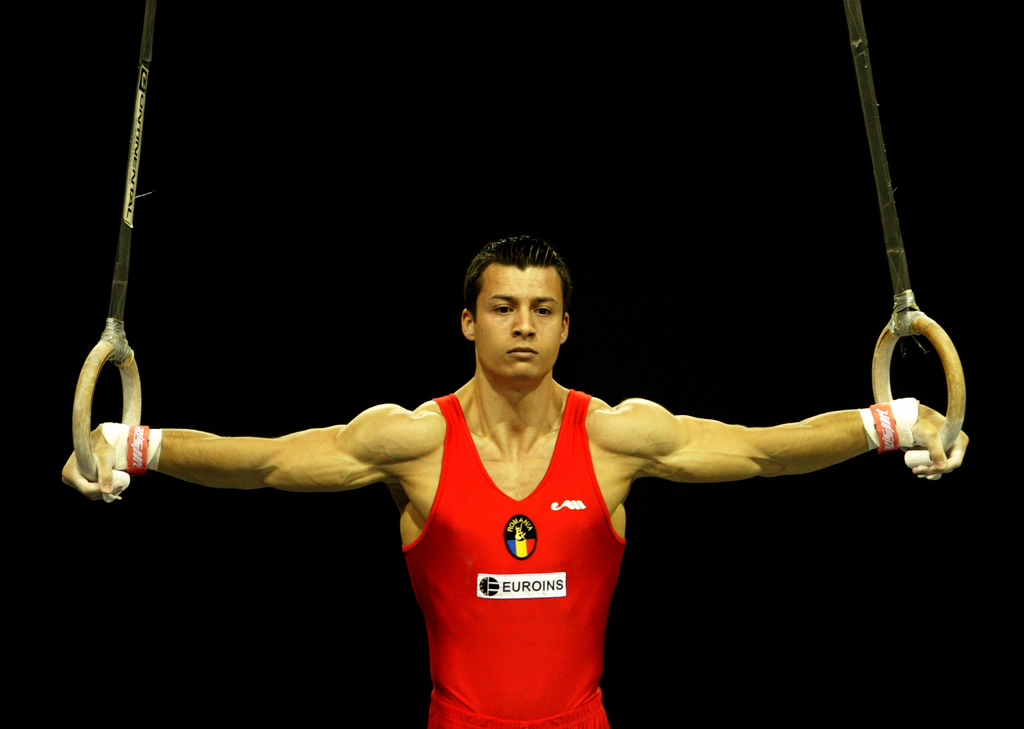
- Stănescu in 2009

Personal information
- Full name: George Robert Stănescu
- Born: 17 January 1985 (age 41) Bucharest, Romania

Gymnastics career
- Discipline: Men's artistic gymnastics
- Country represented: Romania
- Club: CS Dinamo
- Former coaches: Danuţ Grecu, Nicuşor Pascu
- Retired: 2010
Medal record
European Championships
Bronze medal – third place	2008 Lausanne	Team

George Robert Stănescu (born 17 January 1985 in Bucharest) is a Romanian artistic gymnast who specialized in still rings. He is a European bronze medallist with the team and was one of the still rings finalists at the 2008 Olympic Games. He also placed fourth in the still rings final at the 2009 World Championships. After failing to make the national team for the 2010 World Championships, he emigrated to Canada where he worked as a gymnastics coach at Alpha gymnastics club in Windsor, Canada. In January 2013, Stanescu and his wife Ruxandra (a former Romanian gymnast) opened a new club named "Alpha Gymnastics Academy" in Windsor, ON, Canada. In August 2014, Stanescu became a Canadian citizen and part of the Canadian national team.
