= Danny Pinheiro Rodrigues =

French artistic gymnast (born 1985)

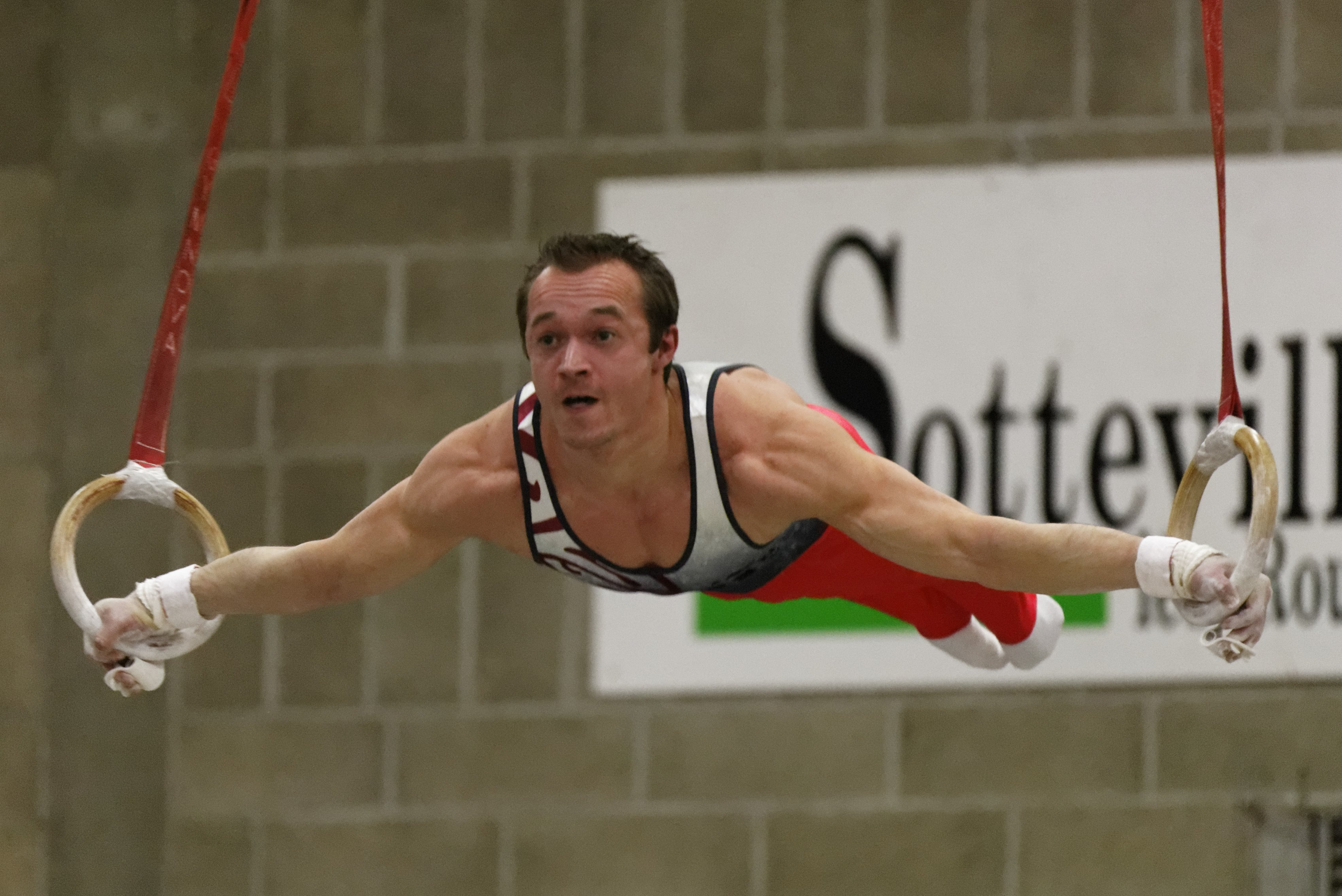
- Pinheiro-Rodrigues in 2011

Personal information
- Nickname: Danny Boule
- Born: 16 April 1985 (age 41)
- Height: 1.61 m (5 ft 3 in)

Gymnastics career
- Discipline: Men's artistic gymnastics
- Country represented: France; (2005–present)
- Club: La Sottevillaise
- Head coach: Frantz Gaillard
Medal record
Men's artistic gymnastics
Representing France
European Championships
Bronze medal – third place	2008 Lausanne	Rings
Bronze medal – third place	2013 Moscow	Rings
Mediterranean Games
Gold medal – first place	2009 Pescara	Rings
Silver medal – second place	2009 Pescara	Team
Silver medal – second place	2009 Pescara	Parallel bars
Bronze medal – third place	2005 Almería	Team

Danny Pinheiro Rodrigues (born 16 April 1985) is a French male artistic gymnast and a member of the national team. He was selected to compete for the French gymnastics squad in two editions of the Summer Olympic Games (2008 in Beijing and 2016 in Rio de Janeiro). He missed 2012 Olympics due to injury.

At his second Olympic appearance in Rio de Janeiro, Pinheiro originally finished the rings apparatus in tenth position from the qualifying phase, but moved into the final after his teammate Samir Aït Saïd suffered a left leg injury and Dutch gymnast Yuri van Gelder was expelled from the competition for breaching team rules, including alcohol consumption.
