= Maria Agafonova =

Russian artistic gymnast

- Мария Агафонова
- Born: October 3, 2005 (age 20)

Gymnastics career
- Discipline: Women's artistic gymnastics
- Country represented: Russia

Maria Agafonova (Russian: Мария Романовна Агафонова; off. sp.: Mariia Agafonova; born 3 October 2005) is a Russian artistic gymnast. She is the 2025 Russian national bronze medalist in the all-around.
