= 2008 European Men's Artistic Gymnastics Championships =

28th European Men's Artistic Gymnastics Championships
- Location: Lausanne, Switzerland
- Dates: 8 May to 11 May 2008
- Nations: Members of the European Union of Gymnastics

The 28th European Men's Artistic Gymnastics Championships held from 8 May to 11 May 2008 in Lausanne.

== Oldest and youngest competitors ==
| Senior | Name | Country | Date of birth | Age |
|---|---|---|---|---|
| Youngest | Tomi Tuuha | Finland | 28/11/89 | 18 years |
| Oldest | Espen Jansen | Norway | 13/12/68 | 39 years |

| Junior | Name | Country | Date of birth | Age |
|---|---|---|---|---|
| Youngest | Sergei Poznyakovs | Latvia | 30/12/93 | 14 years |
| Oldest | Christian Bazan | Spain | 03/01/90 | 18 years |

== Country represented ==
| Albania; Armenia; Azerbaijan; Belgium; Bulgaria; Denmark; Germany; Finland; France; Georgia; Greece; Ireland; Iceland; Israel | Italy; Croatia; Latvia; Lithuania; Luxembourg; Moldova; Monaco; Netherlands; Norway; Austria; Poland; Portugal; Romania; Russia | Sweden; Serbia; Switzerland; Slovakia; Slovenia; Spain; Czech Republic; Turkey; Ukraine; Hungary; Great Britain; Belarus; Cyprus |

== Medallists ==
| Event | Gold | Silver | Bronze |
|---|---|---|---|
Seniors
| Team all-around | Russia; Maxim Deviatovski; Sergei Khorokhordin; Nikolai Kryukov; Yury Ryazanov; Anton Golotsutskov | Germany; Fabian Hambuechen; Philipp Boy; Marcel Nguyen; Robert Weber; Robert Juckel | Romania; Flavius Koczi; Ilie Daniel Popescu; Răzvan Șelariu; Robert Stănescu; Cosmin Malita |
| Floor exercise | (Russia) Anton Golotsutskov | (Romania) Răzvan Șelariu | (Germany) Fabian Hambüchen |
| Pommel horse | (Hungary) Krisztián Berki | (Croatia) Filip Ude | (Croatia) Robert Seligman |
| Rings | (Netherlands) Yuri van Gelder | (Bulgaria) Yordan Yovchev | (France) Danny Rodrigues |
| Vault | (Poland) Leszek Blanik | (Belarus) Dmitry Kasperovich | (Romania) Ilie Daniel Popescu |
| Parallel bars | (Slovenia) Mitja Petkovšek | (France) Yann Cucherat | (Russia) Nikolai Kryukov |
| Horizontal bar | (Germany) Fabian Hambüchen | (Greece) Vlasios Maras | (Slovenia) Aljaž Pegan (Turkey) Ümit Şamiloğlu |
Juniors
| Team all-around | Great Britain; Daniel Keatings; Daniel Purvis; Theo Seager; Sam Oldham; Reece Pearson | Russia; Igor Pakhomenko; Kirill Ignatenkov; Emin Garibov; David Belyavskiy; Matvei Petrov | Germany; Sebastian Krimmer; Philip Sorrer; Ivan Bykov; Andreas Toba; Max Wittenberg-Voges |
| Individual all-around | (United Kingdom) Daniel Keatings | (United Kingdom) Daniel Purvis | (Portugal) Gustavo Simoes |
| Floor exercise | (Greece) Eleftherios Kosmidis | (Spain) Christian Bazan | (United Kingdom) Daniel Keatings |
| Pommel horse | (United Kingdom) Daniel Keatings | (Russia) Matvei Petrov | (Ukraine) Viktor Stepanenko |
| Rings | (Spain) Christian Bazan | (Portugal) Gustavo Simoes | (Russia) Matvei Petrov |
| Vault | (France) Mathieu Jordan | (Russia) David Belyavskiy | (Spain) Christian Bazan |
| Parallel bars | (United Kingdom) Daniel Keatings | (Russia) Emin Garibov | (Spain) Christian Bazan |
| Horizontal bar | (Russia) Emin Garibov | (Germany) Max Wittenberg-Voges | (Russia) Kirill Ignatenkov |

== Senior Results ==
=== Team competition ===
Oldest and youngest competitors

| Senior | Name | Country | Date of birth | Age |
|---|---|---|---|---|
| Youngest | Mykola Kuksenkov | Ukraine | 04/06/89 | 18 years |
| Oldest | Dimitri Karbanenko | France | 19/07/73 | 34 years |

| Rank | Team | Floor (gymnastics) | Pommel horse | Rings (gymnastics) | Vault (gymnastics) | Parallel bars | Horizontal bar | Total |
|---|---|---|---|---|---|---|---|---|
| 1st place, gold medalist(s) | Russia | 45.050 | 42.575 | 45.925 | 47.650 | 46.550 | 44.700 | 272.450 |
| 1st place, gold medalist(s) | Maxim Deviatovski | 15.100 | 13.650 | 15.525 | 16.175 | 15.400 | 14.525 | 272.450 |
| 1st place, gold medalist(s) | Sergei Khorokhordin | 15.025 | - | 15.225 | - | 15.300 | 15.000 | 272.450 |
| 1st place, gold medalist(s) | Nikolai Kryukov | - | 15.150 | - | 14.975 | 15.850 | - | 272.450 |
| 1st place, gold medalist(s) | Yury Ryazanov | - | 13.775 | 15.175 | - | - | 15.175 | 272.450 |
| 1st place, gold medalist(s) | Anton Golotsutskov | 14.925 | - | - | 16.500 | - | - | 272.450 |
| 2nd place, silver medalist(s) | Germany | 44.950 | 43.550 | 42.975 | 47.275 | 45.150 | 45.675 | 269.575 |
| 2nd place, silver medalist(s) | Fabian Hambuechen | 15.250 | - | 15.000 | 16.300 | 15.775 | 15.700 | 269.575 |
| 2nd place, silver medalist(s) | Philipp Boy | 14.875 | 14.400 | - | - | 14.625 | 14.725 | 269.575 |
| 2nd place, silver medalist(s) | Marcel Nguyen | 14.825 | - | - | 15.900 | 14.750 | - | 269.575 |
| 2nd place, silver medalist(s) | Robert Weber | - | 14.750 | 14.700 | - | - | 15.250 | 269.575 |
| 2nd place, silver medalist(s) | Robert Juckel | - | 14.400 | 13.275 | 15.075 | - | - | 269.575 |
| 3rd place, bronze medalist(s) | Romania | 45.175 | 43.800 | 43.925 | 48.725 | 44.800 | 42.525 | 268.950 |
| 3rd place, bronze medalist(s) | Flavius Koczi | 14.975 | 13.800 | 14.050 | 16.450 | 15.125 | 13.875 | 268.950 |
| 3rd place, bronze medalist(s) | Ilie Daniel Popescu | 14.800 | 15.400 | 14.975 | 16.200 | - | - | 268.950 |
| 3rd place, bronze medalist(s) | Răzvan Șelariu | 15.400 | - | - | 16.075 | 14.750 | 14.475 | 268.950 |
| 3rd place, bronze medalist(s) | Robert Stănescu | - | - | 14.900 | - | 14.925 | - | 268.950 |
| 3rd place, bronze medalist(s) | Cosmin Malita | - | 14.600 | - | - | - | 14.175 | 268.950 |
| 4 | Belarus | 43.025 | 41.950 | 45.125 | 47.400 | 45.225 | 43.725 | 266.450 |
| 4 | Dzmitri Savitsky | 13.675 | 13.250 | 15.075 | 15.275 | 14.675 | 14.300 | 266.450 |
| 4 | Dmitri Kaspiarovich | 14.650 | - | 15.025 | 16.425 | 15.125 | - | 266.450 |
| 4 | Denis Savenkov | 14.700 | 14.425 | - | 15.700 | - | 14.800 | 266.450 |
| 4 | Aliaksandr Tsarevich | - | 14.275 | - | - | 15.425 | 14.625 | 266.450 |
| 4 | Uladzimir Yermakov | - | - | 15.025 | - | - | - | 266.450 |
| 5 | France | 44.475 | 39.500 | 44.750 | 48.475 | 46.775 | 42.375 | 266.350 |
| 5 | Gaël Da Silva | 15.275 | - | 14.875 | 15.925 | 15.400 | - | 266.350 |
| 5 | Dmitri Karbanenko | 14.725 | - | - | 16.125 | 15.325 | 15.025 | 266.350 |
| 5 | Raphael Wignanitz | - | 12.975 | 13.950 | 16.425 | - | 12.075 | 266.350 |
| 5 | Yann Cucherat | - | 12.850 | - | - | 16.050 | 15.275 | 266.350 |
| 5 | Danny Rodrigues | 14.475 | 13.675 | 15.925 | - | - | - | 266.350 |
| 6 | Ukraine | 42.625 | 41.600 | 45.650 | 47.550 | 45.400 | 43.050 | 265.875 |
| 6 | Mykola Kuksenkov | 14.600 | 13.700 | 14.775 | 15.350 | 14.900 | 14.900 | 265.875 |
| 6 | Roman Zozulya | 14.150 | - | 15.300 | 16.075 | 14.900 | 14.325 | 265.875 |
| 6 | Oleksandr Suprun | 13.875 | 13.500 | - | 16.125 | - | 13.825 | 265.875 |
| 6 | Valeriy Goncharov | - | 14.400 | - | - | 15.600 | - | 265.875 |
| 6 | Oleksandr Vorobiov | - | - | 15.575 | - | - | - | 265.875 |
| 7 | Switzerland | 44.575 | 42.350 | 42.450 | 47.850 | 44.800 | 42.875 | 264.900 |
| 7 | Nicolas Böschenstein | 15.075 | - | 14.550 | 15.925 | 15.300 | 14.150 | 264.900 |
| 7 | Claudio Capelli | 14.950 | 14.400 | - | 15.950 | 14.950 | 13.875 | 264.900 |
| 7 | Dennis Mannhart | 14.550 | 13.225 | 13.200 | - | 14.550 | - | 264.900 |
| 7 | Mark Ramseier | - | 14.725 | 14.700 | 15.975 | - | - | 264.900 |
| 7 | Christoph Schaerer | - | - | - | - | - | 14.850 | 264.900 |
| 8 | Italy | 43.375 | 41.900 | 44.550 | 46.475 | 43.050 | 44.125 | 263.475 |
| 8 | Enrico Pozzo | 15.100 | 14.175 | 13.575 | 15.675 | 14.475 | 14.375 | 263.475 |
| 8 | Matteo Morandi | 13.900 | - | 15.750 | 15.300 | 14.450 | - | 263.475 |
| 8 | Matteo Angioletti | 14.375 | - | 15.225 | 15.500 | - | - | 263.475 |
| 8 | Alberto Busnari | - | 14.250 | - | - | 14.125 | 14.200 | 263.475 |
| 8 | Igor Cassina | - | 13.475 | - | - | - | 15.550 | 263.475 |

=== Floor ===
Oldest and youngest competitors

| Senior | Name | Country | Date of birth | Age |
|---|---|---|---|---|
| Youngest | Kristian Thomas | United Kingdom | 14/02/89 | 19 years |
| Oldest | Enrico Pozzo | Italy | 12/02/81 | 27 years |

| Position | Gymnast | D Score | E Score | Penalty | Total |
|---|---|---|---|---|---|
| 1st place, gold medalist(s) | Anton Golotsutskov (RUS) | 6.5 | 9.200 | | 15.700 |
| 2nd place, silver medalist(s) | Răzvan Șelariu (ROU) | 6.4 | 9.250 | | 15.650 |
| 3rd place, bronze medalist(s) | Fabian Hambüchen (GER) | 6.6 | 8.875 | 0.1 | 15.375 |
| 4 | Maxim Deviatovski (RUS) | 6.0 | 9.150 | | 15.150 |
| 5 | Dzmitry Savitski (BLR) | 6.2 | 8.850 | 0.1 | 14.950 |
| 6 | Manuel Campos (POR) | 6.0 | 8.900 | | 14.900 |
| 7 | Enrico Pozzo (ITA) | 6.1 | 8.775 | | 14.875 |
| 8 | Kristian Thomas (GBR) | 6.1 | 9.050 | 0.3 | 14.850 |

=== Pommel horse ===
Oldest and youngest competitors

| Senior | Name | Country | Date of birth | Age |
|---|---|---|---|---|
| Youngest | Donna-Donny Truyens | Belgium | 31/03/89 | 19 years |
| Oldest | Nikolai Kryukov | Russia | 11/11/78 | 29 years |

| Position | Gymnast | D Score | E Score | Penalty | Total |
|---|---|---|---|---|---|
| 1st place, gold medalist(s) | Krisztián Berki (HUN) | 6.7 | 9.325 | | 16.025 |
| 2nd place, silver medalist(s) | Filip Ude (CRO) | 6.4 | 9.225 | | 15.625 |
| 3rd place, bronze medalist(s) | Robert Seligman (CRO) | 6.3 | 9.250 | | 15.550 |
| 4 | Flavius Koczi (ROU) | 6.4 | 9.050 | | 15.450 |
| 5 | Harutyun Merdinyan (ARM) | 6.1 | 9.025 | | 15.125 |
| 6 | Donna-Donny Truyens (BEL) | 6.1 | 8.875 | | 14.975 |
| 7 | Nikolai Kryukov (RUS) | 6.1 | 8.400 | | 14.500 |
| 8 | Dzmitry Savitski (BLR) | 5.7 | 8.350 | | 14.050 |

=== Still rings ===
Oldest and youngest competitors

| Senior | Name | Country | Date of birth | Age |
|---|---|---|---|---|
| Youngest | Yuri Ryazanov | Russia | 21/03/87 | 21 years |
| Oldest | Yordan Yovchev | Bulgaria | 24/02/73 | 35 years |

| Position | Gymnast | D Score | E Score | Penalty | Total |
|---|---|---|---|---|---|
| 1st place, gold medalist(s) | Yuri van Gelder (NED) | 7.3 | 9.200 | | 16.500 |
| 2nd place, silver medalist(s) | Yordan Yovchev (BUL) | 7.2 | 9.000 | | 16.200 |
| 3rd place, bronze medalist(s) | Danny Rodrigues (FRA) | 7.1 | 8.950 | | 16.050 |
| 4 | Herodotos Giorgallas (CYP) | 6.4 | 9.050 | | 15.450 |
| 5 | Eduard Gholub (ISR) | 6.7 | 8.675 | | 15.375 |
| 6 | Oleksandr Vorobiov (UKR) | 6.5 | 8.825 | | 15.325 |
| 7 | Maxim Deviatovski (RUS) | 6.3 | 8.525 | | 14.825 |
| 8 | Yury Ryazanov (RUS) | 6.4 | 8.225 | | 14.625 |

=== Vault ===
Oldest and youngest competitors

| Senior | Name | Country | Date of birth | Age |
|---|---|---|---|---|
| Youngest | Fabian Hambüchen | Germany | 25/10/87 | 20 years |
| Oldest | Leszek Blanik | Poland | 01/03/77 | 31 years |

| Rank | Gymnast | D Score | E Score | Pen. | Score 1 | D Score | E Score | Pen. | Score 2 | Total |
|---|---|---|---|---|---|---|---|---|---|---|
| 1st place, gold medalist(s) | Leszek Blanik (POL) | 7.0 | 9.600 | | 16.600 | 7.0 | 9.525 | | 16.525 | 16.562 |
| 2nd place, silver medalist(s) | Dmitri Kaspiarovich (BLR) | 7.0 | 9.350 | | 16.350 | 7.0 | 9.450 | | 16.450 | 16.400 |
| 3rd place, bronze medalist(s) | Ilie Daniel Popescu (ROU) | 7.0 | 9.250 | | 16.250 | 7.0 | 9.450 | | 16.450 | 16.350 |
| 4 | Anton Golotsutskov (RUS) | 7.0 | 9.425 | | 16.425 | 6.6 | 9.325 | | 15.925 | 16.175 |
| 5 | Răzvan Șelariu (ROU) | 6.6 | 9.350 | | 15.950 | 6.6 | 9.500 | 0.1 | 16.000 | 15.975 |
| 5 | Jeffrey Wammes (NED) | 6.6 | 9.250 | | 15.850 | 6.6 | 9.500 | | 16.100 | 15.975 |
| 5 | Fabian Hambüchen (GER) | 6.6 | 9.575 | | 16.175 | 6.2 | 9.575 | | 15.775 | 15.975 |
| 8 | Jevgēņijs Saproņenko (LAT) | 7.0 | 9.000 | 0.3 | 15.700 | 7.0 | 8.450 | 0.1 | 15.350 | 15.525 |

=== Parallel bars ===
Oldest and youngest competitors

| Senior | Name | Country | Date of birth | Age |
|---|---|---|---|---|
| Youngest | Fabian Hambüchen | Germany | 25/10/87 | 20 years |
| Oldest | Mitja Petkovšek | Slovenia | 06/02/77 | 31 years |

| Position | Gymnast | D Score | E Score | Penalty | Total |
|---|---|---|---|---|---|
| 1st place, gold medalist(s) | Mitja Petkovšek (SLO) | 6.6 | 9.425 | | 16.025 |
| 2nd place, silver medalist(s) | Yann Cucherat (FRA) | 6.7 | 9.300 | | 16.000 |
| 3rd place, bronze medalist(s) | Nikolai Kryukov (RUS) | 6.7 | 9.175 | | 15.875 |
| 4 | Valeriy Goncharov (UKR) | 6.6 | 9.175 | | 15.775 |
| 5 | Fabian Hambüchen (GER) | 6.6 | 9.100 | | 15.700 |
| 6 | Aliaksandr Tsarevich (BLR) | 6.7 | 8.875 | | 15.575 |
| 7 | Maxim Deviatovski (RUS) | 6.2 | 9.075 | | 15.275 |
| 8 | Vasileios Tsolakidis (GRE) | 6.2 | 8.275 | | 14.475 |

=== Horizontal bar ===
Oldest and youngest competitors

| Senior | Name | Country | Date of birth | Age |
|---|---|---|---|---|
| Youngest | Fabian Hambüchen | Germany | 25/10/87 | 20 years |
| Oldest | Aljaž Pegan | Slovenia | 02/06/74 | 33 years |

| Position | Gymnast | D Score | E Score | Penalty | Total |
|---|---|---|---|---|---|
| 1st place, gold medalist(s) | Fabian Hambüchen (GER) | 7.0 | 9.025 | | 16.025 |
| 2nd place, silver medalist(s) | Vlasios Maras (GRE) | 6.8 | 9.050 | | 15.850 |
| 3rd place, bronze medalist(s) | Aljaž Pegan (SLO) | 6.7 | 8.600 | | 15.300 |
| 3rd place, bronze medalist(s) | Ümit Şamiloğlu (TUR) | 6.8 | 8.500 | | 15.300 |
| 5 | Jeffrey Wammes (NED) | 6.5 | 8.250 | | 14.750 |
| 6 | Igor Cassina (ITA) | 6.3 | 8.200 | | 14.500 |
| 7 | Robert Weber (GER) | 6.4 | 7.825 | | 14.225 |
| 8 | Roman Kulesza (POL) | 5.9 | 7.750 | | 13.650 |

== Junior Results ==
=== Team competition ===
The junior team competition also served as the individual all-around and qualification to the individual event finals.

| Rank | Team | Floor (gymnastics) | Pommel horse | Rings (gymnastics) | Vault (gymnastics) | Parallel bars | Horizontal bar | Total |
|---|---|---|---|---|---|---|---|---|
| 1st place, gold medalist(s) | Great Britain | 44.075 | 45.100 | 43.200 | 47.375 | 43.875 | 41.850 | 265.475 |
| 1st place, gold medalist(s) | Daniel Keatings | 14.800 | 15.825 | 14.450 | 15.800 | 14.875 | 13.950 | 265.475 |
| 1st place, gold medalist(s) | Daniel Purvis | 14.650 | 14.300 | 14.475 | 15.725 | 14.550 | 13.900 | 265.475 |
| 1st place, gold medalist(s) | Sam Oldham | 14.275 | 14.275 | 14.275 | 14.900 | 14.150 | 14.000 | 265.475 |
| 1st place, gold medalist(s) | Theo Seager | 14.625 | - | 13.025 | 15.850 | - | 13.850 | 265.475 |
| 1st place, gold medalist(s) | Reece Pearson | - | 14.975 | - | - | 14.450 | - | 265.475 |
| 2nd place, silver medalist(s) | Russia | 42.850 | 43.700 | 43.100 | 46.800 | 43.800 | 43.050 | 263.300 |
| 2nd place, silver medalist(s) | Emin Garibov | 13.575 | 13.825 | 14.500 | 14.925 | 14.775 | 14.450 | 263.300 |
| 2nd place, silver medalist(s) | Igor Pakhomenko | 14.500 | 14.650 | 13.550 | 15.700 | 13.300 | 14.175 | 263.300 |
| 2nd place, silver medalist(s) | David Belyavskiy | 14.475 | 11.575 | 14.100 | 16.175 | 14.400 | 14.200 | 263.300 |
| 2nd place, silver medalist(s) | Kirill Ignatenkov | 13.875 | - | - | 12.750 | 14.625 | 14.400 | 263.300 |
| 2nd place, silver medalist(s) | Matvei Petrov | - | 15.225 | 14.500 | - | - | - | 263.300 |
| 3rd place, bronze medalist(s) | Germany | 42.025 | 42.975 | 41.225 | 46.400 | 43.625 | 42.225 | 258.475 |
| 3rd place, bronze medalist(s) | Andreas Toba | 13.525 | 13.850 | 14.000 | 15.700 | 14.400 | 14.200 | 258.475 |
| 3rd place, bronze medalist(s) | Philip Sorrer | 13.475 | 14.675 | 14.000 | 14.900 | 14.575 | 13.850 | 258.475 |
| 3rd place, bronze medalist(s) | Sebastian Krimmer | 14.125 | 14.450 | 13.225 | 14.950 | 14.650 | 13.500 | 258.475 |
| 3rd place, bronze medalist(s) | Ivan Bykov | 14.375 | 13.500 | - | 15.750 | 13.775 | - | 258.475 |
| 3rd place, bronze medalist(s) | Max Wittenberg-Voges | - | - | 12.250 | - | - | 14.175 | 258.475 |
| 4 | Switzerland | 43.075 | 40.525 | 41.775 | 45.850 | 42.625 | 41.425 | 255.275 |
| 4 | Silvan Honauer | 14.050 | 13.850 | 13.325 | 15.175 | 14.500 | 13.500 | 255.275 |
| 4 | Lucas Fischer | 14.675 | 12.925 | 14.225 | 15.375 | 14.300 | 11.850 | 255.275 |
| 4 | Simon Nutzi | 13.975 | 11.625 | 13.750 | 15.075 | - | 14.075 | 255.275 |
| 4 | Kevin Rossi | 14.350 | - | 13.800 | 15.300 | 13.825 | - | 255.275 |
| 4 | Mirco Stillhart | - | 13.750 | - | - | 13.350 | 13.850 | 255.275 |
| 5 | Ukraine | 41.525 | 42.750 | 42.150 | 45.700 | 42.200 | 40.750 | 255.075 |
| 5 | Petro Pakhnyuk | 13.775 | 14.500 | 14.300 | 15.675 | 13.850 | 13.925 | 255.075 |
| 5 | Horhii Petrosian | 13.250 | 13.700 | 13.770 | 14.900 | 13.775 | 13.475 | 255.075 |
| 5 | Andriy Syenichkin | 13.300 | 13.725 | - | 14.425 | 13.725 | 13.325 | 255.075 |
| 5 | Vladyslav Yaroslavtsev | 14.450 | - | 14.050 | 15.125 | - | 13.350 | 255.075 |
| 5 | Viktor Stepanenko | - | 14.525 | 13.800 | - | 14.575 | - | 255.075 |
| 6 | Spain | 42.800 | 37.900 | 43.500 | 46.600 | 41.600 | 40.575 | 252.975 |
| 6 | Christian Bazan | 14.500 | 12.275 | 15.125 | 15.825 | 14.600 | 13.625 | 252.975 |
| 6 | Ruben Lopez | 14.175 | 10.450 | 13.675 | 14.825 | 13.175 | 12.500 | 252.975 |
| 6 | Enrique Navarro | - | 12.725 | 14.700 | 15.600 | 13.025 | 13.175 | 252.975 |
| 6 | Eduardo Bermejo | 14.125 | 12.900 | 13.100 | 15.175 | 13.825 | - | 252.975 |
| 6 | Fabian Gonzalez | 14.025 | - | - | - | - | 13.775 | 252.975 |
| 7 | Greece | 43.725 | 38.500 | 42.200 | 46.350 | 41.375 | 40.750 | 252.900 |
| 7 | Stravos Kekelos | 14.750 | 11.875 | 13.275 | 15.850 | 13.850 | 13.825 | 252.900 |
| 7 | Eleftherios Kosmidis | 15.400 | 12.425 | 14.450 | 15.700 | 13.800 | 10.925 | 252.900 |
| 7 | Georgios Georgiadis | 13.050 | 12.400 | 12.700 | 14.600 | 13.400 | 13.075 | 252.900 |
| 7 | Eleftherios Petrounias | 13.575 | - | 14.475 | 14.800 | - | - | 252.900 |
| 7 | Konstantinos Karantonas | - | 13.675 | - | - | 13.725 | 13.850 | 252.900 |
| 8 | France | 41.375 | 39.050 | 39.975 | 46.875 | 42.800 | 40.875 | 250.950 |
| 8 | Axel Augis | 13.150 | 12.500 | 13.125 | 14.300 | 14.950 | 13.800 | 250.950 |
| 8 | Mauricio Lima | 13.175 | 8.200 | 12.600 | 15.600 | 13.600 | 12.850 | 250.950 |
| 8 | Jim Zona | 13.825 | 12.800 | 13.525 | 15.025 | - | 13.100 | 250.950 |
| 8 | Bastian Peter | - | 13.750 | 13.325 | - | 14.250 | 13.975 | 250.950 |
| 8 | Mathieu Jordan | 14.375 | - | - | 16.250 | 12.550 | - | 250.950 |

=== Floor exercise ===
| Position | Gymnast | D Score | E Score | Penalty | Total |
|---|---|---|---|---|---|
| 1st place, gold medalist(s) | Eleftherios Kosmidis (GRE) | 6.3 | 9.225 | | 15.525 |
| 2nd place, silver medalist(s) | Christian Bazan (ESP) | 6.1 | 9.000 | | 15.100 |
| 3rd place, bronze medalist(s) | Daniel Keatings (GBR) | 5.8 | 9.200 | | 15.000 |
| 4 | Lucas Fischer (SUI) | 5.7 | 9.175 | | 14.875 |
| 5 | Daniel Purvis (GBR) | 6.1 | 8.750 | | 14.850 |
| 6 | Vlad Cotuna (ROU) | 5.9 | 8.500 | | 14.400 |
| 7 | Igor Pakhomenko (RUS) | 5.6 | 8.100 | | 13.700 |
| 8 | Stravos Kekelos (GRE) | 5.4 | 7.475 | | 12.875 |

=== Pommel horse ===
| Position | Gymnast | D Score | E Score | Penalty | Total |
|---|---|---|---|---|---|
| 1st place, gold medalist(s) | Daniel Keatings (GBR) | 6.4 | 9.250 | | 15.650 |
| 2nd place, silver medalist(s) | Matvei Petrov (RUS) | 6.0 | 9.075 | | 15.075 |
| 3rd place, bronze medalist(s) | Viktor Stepanenko (UKR) | 6.1 | 8.750 | | 14.850 |
| 4 | Reece Pearson (GBR) | 5.8 | 8.975 | | 14.775 |
| 5 | Petro Pakhnyuk (UKR) | 5.6 | 8.975 | | 14.575 |
| 6 | Igor Pakhomenko (RUS) | 5.5 | 8.950 | | 14.450 |
| 7 | Sebastian Krimmer (GER) | 4.8 | 8.250 | | 13.050 |
| 8 | Philip Sorrer (GER) | 4.3 | 8.675 | | 12.975 |

=== Still rings ===
| Position | Gymnast | D Score | E Score | Penalty | Total |
|---|---|---|---|---|---|
| 1st place, gold medalist(s) | Christian Bazan (ESP) | 6.1 | 9.050 | | 15.150 |
| 2nd place, silver medalist(s) | Gustavo Simoes (POR) | 6.0 | 8.975 | | 14.975 |
| 3rd place, bronze medalist(s) | Matvei Petrov (RUS) | 5.4 | 9.100 | | 14.500 |
| 4 | Emin Garibov (RUS) | 5.1 | 9.300 | | 14.400 |
| 5 | Daniel Keatings (GBR) | 5.4 | 8.875 | | 14.275 |
| 6 | Daniel Purvis (GBR) | 5.4 | 8.800 | | 14.200 |
| 7 | Eleftherios Petrounias (GRE) | 5.5 | 8.575 | | 14.075 |
| 8 | Enrique Navarro (ESP) | 5.3 | 7.050 | | 12.350 |

=== Vault ===
| Rank | Gymnast | D Score | E Score | Pen. | Score 1 | D Score | E Score | Pen. | Score 2 | Total |
|---|---|---|---|---|---|---|---|---|---|---|
| 1st place, gold medalist(s) | Mathieu Jordan (FRA) | 7.0 | 9.200 | | 16.200 | 6.2 | 9.375 | 0.1 | 15.475 | 15.837 |
| 2nd place, silver medalist(s) | David Belyavskiy (RUS) | 6.6 | 9.425 | 0.1 | 15.925 | 6.2 | 9.500 | | 15.700 | 15.812 |
| 3rd place, bronze medalist(s) | Christian Bazan (ESP) | 6.6 | 8.850 | | 15.450 | 6.2 | 9.450 | | 15.650 | 15.550 |
| 4 | Eleftherios Kosmidis (GRE) | 6.2 | 9.475 | | 15.675 | 6.2 | 9.100 | | 15.300 | 15.487 |
| 5 | Theo Seager (GBR) | 6.2 | 9.475 | | 15.675 | 6.6 | 8.975 | 0.3 | 15.275 | 15.475 |
| 6 | Stravos Kekelos (GRE) | 6.6 | 9.150 | | 15.750 | 6.2 | 8.975 | | 15.175 | 15.462 |
| 7 | Ivan Bykov (GER) | 6.2 | 9.425 | | 15.625 | 5.8 | 9.350 | | 15.150 | 15.387 |
| 8 | Andrea Cingolani (ITA) | 6.2 | 9.125 | | 15.325 | 6.2 | 8.775 | 0.3 | 14.675 | 15.000 |

=== Parallel bars ===
| Position | Gymnast | D Score | E Score | Penalty | Total |
|---|---|---|---|---|---|
| 1st place, gold medalist(s) | Daniel Keatings (GBR) | 6.1 | 9.200 | | 15.300 |
| 2nd place, silver medalist(s) | Emin Garibov (RUS) | 5.9 | 9.125 | | 15.025 |
| 3rd place, bronze medalist(s) | Christian Bazan (ESP) | 5.9 | 8.675 | | 14.575 |
| 4 | Dimitris Krasias (CYP) | 5.6 | 8.875 | | 14.475 |
| 5 | Kirill Ignatenkov (RUS) | 5.7 | 8.725 | | 14.425 |
| 6 | Philip Sorrer (GER) | 5.6 | 8.775 | | 14.375 |
| 7 | Viktor Stepanenko (UKR) | 5.6 | 8.625 | | 14.225 |
| 8 | Sebastian Krimmer (GER) | 5.5 | 8.275 | | 13.775 |

=== Horizontal bar ===
| Position | Gymnast | D Score | E Score | Penalty | Total |
|---|---|---|---|---|---|
| 1st place, gold medalist(s) | Emin Garibov (RUS) | 5.8 | 8.825 | | 14.625 |
| 2nd place, silver medalist(s) | Max Wittenberg-Voges (GER) | 5.7 | 8.675 | | 14.375 |
| 3rd place, bronze medalist(s) | Kirill Ignatenkov (RUS) | 5.5 | 8.825 | | 14.325 |
| 4 | Simon Nutzi (SUI) | 5.2 | 8.900 | | 14.100 |
| 5 | Rokas Guščinas (LTU) | 4.8 | 9.175 | | 13.975 |
| 6 | Aliaksandr Pristauka (BLR) | 5.1 | 8.850 | | 13.950 |
| 7 | Andreas Toba (GER) | 5.6 | 8.300 | | 13.900 |
| 8 | Dávid Vecsernyés (HUN) | 5.5 | 7.550 | | 13.050 |

== Medal count ==
=== Combined ===
| Rank | Nation | Gold | Silver | Bronze | Total |
|---|---|---|---|---|---|
| 1 | Great Britain (GBR) | 4 | 1 | 1 | 6 |
| 2 | Russia (RUS) | 3 | 4 | 3 | 10 |
| 3 | Germany (GER) | 1 | 2 | 2 | 5 |
| 4 | Spain (ESP) | 1 | 1 | 2 | 4 |
| 5 | France (FRA) | 1 | 1 | 1 | 3 |
| 6 | Greece (GRE) | 1 | 1 | 0 | 2 |
| 7 | Slovenia (SLO) | 1 | 0 | 1 | 2 |
| 8 | Hungary (HUN) | 1 | 0 | 0 | 1 |
| 8 | Netherlands (NED) | 1 | 0 | 0 | 1 |
| 8 | Poland (POL) | 1 | 0 | 0 | 1 |
| 11 | Romania (ROU) | 0 | 1 | 2 | 3 |
| 12 | Croatia (CRO) | 0 | 1 | 1 | 2 |
| 12 | Portugal (POR) | 0 | 1 | 1 | 2 |
| 14 | Belarus (BLR) | 0 | 1 | 0 | 1 |
| 14 | Bulgaria (BUL) | 0 | 1 | 0 | 1 |
| 16 | Turkey (TUR) | 0 | 0 | 1 | 1 |
| 16 | Ukraine (UKR) | 0 | 0 | 1 | 1 |
| Totals (17 entries) | | 15 | 15 | 16 | 46 |

=== Seniors ===
| Rank | Nation | Gold | Silver | Bronze | Total |
|---|---|---|---|---|---|
| 1 | Russia (RUS) | 2 | 0 | 1 | 3 |
| 2 | Germany (GER) | 1 | 1 | 1 | 3 |
| 3 | Slovenia (SLO) | 1 | 0 | 1 | 2 |
| 4 | Hungary (HUN) | 1 | 0 | 0 | 1 |
| 4 | Netherlands (NED) | 1 | 0 | 0 | 1 |
| 4 | Poland (POL) | 1 | 0 | 0 | 1 |
| 7 | Romania (ROU) | 0 | 1 | 2 | 3 |
| 8 | Croatia (CRO) | 0 | 1 | 1 | 2 |
| 8 | France (FRA) | 0 | 1 | 1 | 2 |
| 10 | Belarus (BLR) | 0 | 1 | 0 | 1 |
| 10 | Bulgaria (BUL) | 0 | 1 | 0 | 1 |
| 10 | Greece (GRE) | 0 | 1 | 0 | 1 |
| 13 | Turkey (TUR) | 0 | 0 | 1 | 1 |
| Totals (13 entries) | | 7 | 7 | 8 | 22 |

=== Juniors ===
| Rank | Nation | Gold | Silver | Bronze | Total |
|---|---|---|---|---|---|
| 1 | Great Britain (GBR) | 4 | 1 | 1 | 6 |
| 2 | Russia (RUS) | 1 | 4 | 2 | 7 |
| 3 | Spain (ESP) | 1 | 1 | 2 | 4 |
| 4 | France (FRA) | 1 | 0 | 0 | 1 |
| 4 | Greece (GRE) | 1 | 0 | 0 | 1 |
| 6 | Germany (GER) | 0 | 1 | 1 | 2 |
| 6 | Portugal (POR) | 0 | 1 | 1 | 2 |
| 8 | Ukraine (UKR) | 0 | 0 | 1 | 1 |
| Totals (8 entries) | | 8 | 8 | 8 | 24 |
