= Leszek Blanik =

Polish artistic gymnast

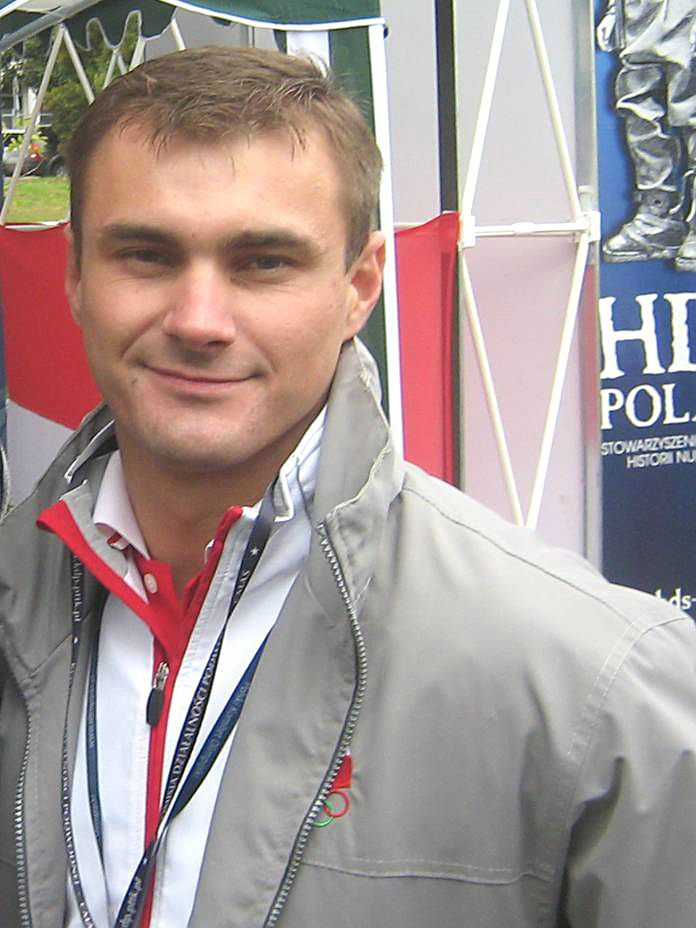

Personal information
- Full name: Leszek Robert Blanik
- Born: 1 March 1977 (age 49) Wodzisław Śląski, Poland

Gymnastics career
- Discipline: Men's artistic gymnastics
- Country represented: Poland
- Club: AZS-AWFiS Gdańsk
- Head coach: Andrey Levit
- Assistant coach: Piotr Mikolajek
Medal record
Olympic Games
| Gold medal – first place | 2008 Beijing | Vault |
| Bronze medal – third place | 2000 Sydney | Vault |
World Championships
| Gold medal – first place | 2007 Stuttgart | Vault |
| Silver medal – second place | 2002 Debrecen | Vault |
| Silver medal – second place | 2005 Melbourne | Vault |
World Cup Final
| Silver medal – second place | 2002 Stuttgart | Vault |
European Championships
| Gold medal – first place | 2008 Lausanne | Vault |
| Bronze medal – third place | 2004 Ljubljana | Vault |

Leszek Robert Blanik (born 1 March 1977 in Wodzisław Śląski) is a Polish gymnast, World and Olympic champion in vault. He was the first to perform a handspring double front vault in piked position which now has been named after him.

== Olympics ==
Blanik picked up a bronze in vault at the 2000 Summer Olympics in Sydney.

On 18 August 2008, he won the gold medal in men's vault at the Olympics in Beijing, becoming the first Polish Olympic champion in a gymnastics event.

== World championships ==
Blanik won a gold medal in vault at the 2007 World Championships in Stuttgart, earning him an individual berth to the 2008 Beijing Olympics. He also has two World silver medals, from 2002 in Debrecen, and 2005 in Melbourne.

== Awards ==
For his sport achievements, Blanik received:
Knight's Cross of the Order of Polonia Restituta (5th Class) in 2008.
Golden Cross of Merit in 2000.
