= Gymnastics at the 2008 Summer Olympics – Men's vault =

Olympic gymnastics event

Men's vault at the Games of the XXIX Olympiad
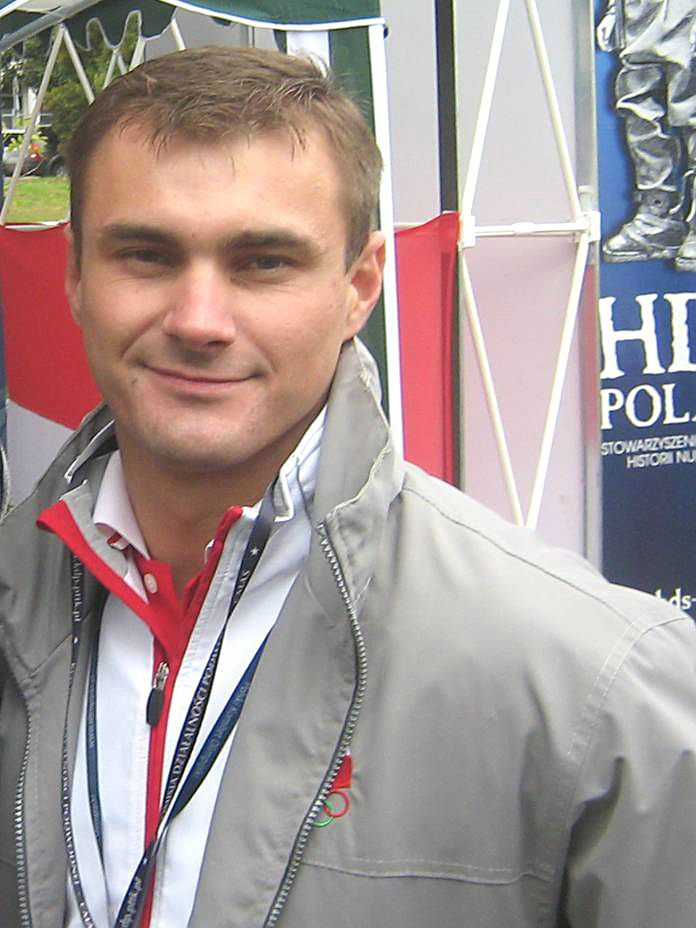
- Leszek Blanik
- Venue: Beijing National Indoor Stadium
- Dates: 9 August (qualifying); 18 August (final)
- Competitors: 16 from 13 nations
- Winning score: 16.537

Medalists
1st place, gold medalist(s)		Leszek Blanik; Poland
2nd place, silver medalist(s)		Thomas Bouhail; France
3rd place, bronze medalist(s)		Anton Golotsutskov; Russia

The men's vault competition at the 2008 Summer Olympics was held on August 9 and 18 at the Beijing National Indoor Stadium. The eight competitors (with a maximum of two per nation) with the highest scores in qualifying, among the gymnasts electing to make two vaults, proceeded to the men's vault finals. There, each gymnast performed two vaults; the scores from the final round (ignoring qualification) determined final ranking. There were 16 competitors from 13 nations that made a second vault attempt. The event was won by Leszek Blanik of Poland, the nation's first victory in the men's vault. Blanik was the seventh man to win multiple medals in the event, adding to his 2000 bronze. France earned its first medal in the event with Thomas Bouhail's silver. Anton Golotsutskov of Russia took bronze, putting the nation back on the podium after a one-Games absence.

== Background ==
This was the 22nd appearance of the event, which is one of the five apparatus events held every time there were apparatus events at the Summer Olympics (no apparatus events were held in 1900, 1908, 1912, or 1920). Two of the eight finalists from 2004 returned: bronze medalist Marian Drăgulescu of Romania and fourth-place finisher Kyle Shewfelt of Canada. Three others (two-time gold medalist Gervasio Deferr of Spain, seventh-place finisher Li Xiaopeng of China, and sixth-place finisher Róbert Gál of Hungary) competed in Beijing but did not make the two vault attempts necessary to participate in the vault event. Leszek Blanik of Poland, the 2000 bronze medalist, was the reigning (2007) world champion and 2005 runner-up; Drăgulescu had won in 2001, 2005, and 2006. Drăgulescu was favored in the event.

Yemen made its debut in the men's vault. Italy made its 18th appearance, most of any nation competing in the vault in 2008 but one behind the United States (which had male gymnasts in Beijing but none who performed two vaults in the qualifying).

== Qualification ==
Qualification for the men's artistic gymnastics in 2008 was based entirely on the 2007 World Artistic Gymnastics Championships. The top 12 teams at the world championships could send a full team of 6 gymnasts to the Olympics. The next 3 teams (#13 through #15) could send 2 gymnasts. The 3 teams after that (#16 through #18) could send 1 gymnast. The next 7 individual gymnasts (only from nations without any qualified gymnasts yet) and apparatus gold medal winners also qualified. The FIG Executive Board made invitational selections to ensure host country and continental representation and the Tripartite Commission made an invitation. The quota of 98 gymnasts was then filled through additional individual gymnasts.

== Competition format ==
The 1996 gymnastics competition had introduced the "7–6–5" format, in which each team had 7 members, designated 6 for each apparatus, and had 5 count for team scores. In 2000, this was reduced across the board to a "6–5–4" format; the 2008 competition kept this format. Further, while in 1996 all 7 team members could compete on each apparatus for individual purposes, since 2000 only the 5 designated for that apparatus competed. The 2000 competition had also eliminated the compulsory exercises; only voluntary exercises were done on each apparatus. The qualifying round scores were used for qualification for the team all-around, individual all-around, and apparatus finals. An additional complication was added in 2008: most gymnasts needed to perform only one vault exercise for the team and individual all-around qualifying, while those who wanted to compete in the vault apparatus performed two vaults (with the average of the two scores counting).

The top eight gymnasts, with a limit of two per nation, advanced to the final. Non-finalists were ranked 9th through 16th based on preliminary score. The preliminary score had no effect on the final; once the eight finalists were selected, their ranking depended only on the final exercise. For the vault, the final consisted of two attempts per gymnast, with the average score of the two counting.

Scoring in artistic gymnastics is based on two separate scores that are then combined in order to come to the final score. The A score measures the difficulty of each element (and combinations of elements) within the routine, while the B score evaluates the performance, ie, the "execution, composition and artistry" of the routine. For further information, please see the Code of Points article.

== Schedule ==
All times are China Standard Time (UTC+8)

Date	Time	Round
Saturday, 9 August 2008	12:00	Qualifying
Monday, 18 August 2008	19:00	Final

== Results ==
=== Qualifying ===
Only gymnasts performing two vaults during the qualification round were considered for the vault final. The average score of the two vaults was the preliminary score. The top 8 gymnasts, with a limit of 2 per nation, qualified for the final.

=== Final ===
The tie between Blanik and Bouhail was broken by the highest individual vault (Blanik's best was 16.600 in his first vault, Bouhail's best was 16.575 in his first vault).

Rank	Gymnast	Nation	Vault 1				Vault 2				Total
Rank	Gymnast	Nation	D Score	E Score	Pen.	Vault Score	D Score	E Score	Pen.	Vault Score	Total
1st place, gold medalist(s)	Leszek Blanik	Poland	7.000	9.600		16.600	7.000	9.475		16.475	16.537
2nd place, silver medalist(s)	Thomas Bouhail	France	7.000	9.575		16.575	7.000	9.500		16.500	16.537
3rd place, bronze medalist(s)	Anton Golotsutskov	Russia	7.000	9.500		16.500	7.000	9.450		16.450	16.475
4	Marian Drăgulescu	Romania	7.000	9.800		16.800	7.200	8.750	0.3	15.650	16.225
5	Benoît Caranobe	France	7.000	9.375	0.1	16.275	7.000	8.950	0.1	15.850	16.062
6	Dmitry Kasperovich	Belarus	7.000	9.300		16.300	7.000	8.900	0.1	15.800	16.050
7	Flavius Koczi	Romania	7.000	8.800	0.3	15.500	7.000	9.350		16.350	15.925
8	Isaac Botella	Spain	6.600	9.475		16.075	6.600	9.100	0.3	15.400	15.737

Reserves

The reserves for the vault event final were:

- Kyle Shewfelt (CAN) (6.600 A, 9.750 B)
- Fabian Hambuechen (GER) (6.600 A, 9.700 B)
- Vlasios Maras (GRE) (6.600 A, 9.425 B, 0.100 Penalty)
