= Yuri Ryazanov =

Russian artistic gymnast

- Full name: Yuri Sergeyevich Ryazanov
- Alternative name: Yury
- Born: March 21, 1987 Vladimir
- Died: October 20, 2009 (aged 22) Vorsha, Sobinsko Region; Russia
- Height: 1.72 m (5 ft 8 in)

Gymnastics career
- Discipline: Men's artistic gymnastics
- Country represented: Russia
- Club: Russian Army Sports Club
- Head coach: Yevgeny Nikolko
- Assistant coach: Igor Kalabushkin
Medal record
Men's artistic gymnastics
Representing Russia
World Championships
Silver medal – second place	2006 Aarhus	Team
Bronze medal – third place	2009 London	All-Around
European Championships
Gold medal – first place	2008 Lausanne	Team
Bronze medal – third place	2007 Amsterdam	All-Around
Bronze medal – third place	2009 Milan	All-Around
Pacific Rim Championships
Silver medal – second place	2008 San Jose	Horizontal Bar
Silver medal – second place	2008 San Jose	Rings

Yuri Sergeyevich Ryazanov (Russian: Ю́рий Серге́евич Ряза́нов; 21 March 1987 – 20 October 2009) was a Russian artistic gymnast. He was the 2009 World All-Around bronze medalist, the 2009 Russian All-Around national champion, and the 2007 & 2009 European All-Around bronze medalist. He was a member of the Russian teams that won the gold medals at the 2008 European Men's Artistic Gymnastics Championships and silver at the 2006 World Artistic Gymnastics Championships. Ryazanov competed at the 2008 Summer Olympics in Beijing, China, placing 17th in the qualifications for the individual all-around, but did not advance to the final due to the two per country rule.

== Career ==
Ryazanov became a member of the Russian senior national team in 2006.

In 2006, he finished 5th on pommel horse and 8th on rings at the Shanghai World Cup in China and then placed 16th in the all around at the 2006 World Artistic Gymnastics Championships in Aarhus, Denmark. In the team competition, he helped the Russian team to the silver medal.

He won the bronze medal in the All-Around at the 2007 European Championships in Amsterdam, and placed 13th in the all-around at the 2007 World Artistic Gymnastics Championships in Stuttgart, Germany.

Ryazanov placed third on parallel bars at the 2008 Moscow World Cup and 8th on rings at the 2008 European Men's Artistic Gymnastics Championships in Lausanne, Switzerland. He won the silver medals on rings and high bar, and placed 4th with his team at the 2008 Pacific Rim Championships in San Jose, California. He then won the bronze medal in the all-around at the 2008 Russian Cup in Lobnya, behind Maxim Devyatovsky and Sergei Khorokhordin; all three earned automatic berths onto the Olympic team. Ryazanov finished 17th in the preliminary round of the all-around at the 2008 Olympic Games in Beijing, China and did not advance to the event final. The Russian team felt Ryazanov should have competed in the all-around final over teammate Maxim Devyatovsky, who they felt purposefully held back during the team final competition. In the team competition, Russia finished sixth out of eight countries, with China, Japan, and the United States of America finishing 1-2-3.

At the 2009 Russian Artistic Gymnastics Championships in Bryansk in March, 2009, Ryazanov won the all-around and the floor exercises with a total score of 88.225. He went on to place sixth overall at the 2009 American Cup, held outside of Chicago.

In April, he won the bronze medal in the all-around at the 2009 European Artistic Gymnastics Championships in Milan, Italy behind Fabian Hambüchen of Germany and Daniel Keatings of Great Britain. At the Russian Cup in August, he won the gold medal in the all-around, the silver medal on the rings, the bronze medals on the pommel horse and high bar, and placed 7th on floor.

At the 2009 World Artistic Gymnastics Championships in October, he won the bronze medal in the all-around with a score of 88.400.

== Life and death ==
Ryazanov was born in Vladimir, Vladimir Oblast. He died in a car crash in the village Vorsha in the Sobinsko Region, about 125 miles east of Moscow, on October 20, 2009, just two days after the World Championships had concluded.

Police spokesman Oleg Kurochkin told The Associated Press that Ryazanov died at the scene after his car was involved in a head-on collision.

Natalia Kalugina, a spokesperson for the Russian Gymnastics Federation, said "This is very tragic news for Russian gymnastics. He was one of our most talented young athletes who could have achieved great things", as reported by Reuters.

Teammate Maxim Devyatovsky said some members of the junior team had noticed that the car, left at the training center, had been too low in the front.

The head of Russian men's gymnastics, Yevgeny Nikolko, told All Sport "I'm still in shock. When he told me he was going to drive home I just told him 'Please, be careful'. And now this terrible thing happened. I have no words to describe it."

Ryazanov was buried in the Ulybyshevskoe Cemetery in Vladimir on October 22.

== See also ==
- List of Olympic male artistic gymnasts for Russia
