= Ksenia Semyonova =

Russian artistic gymnast

Ksenia Semyonova Ксения Семёнова
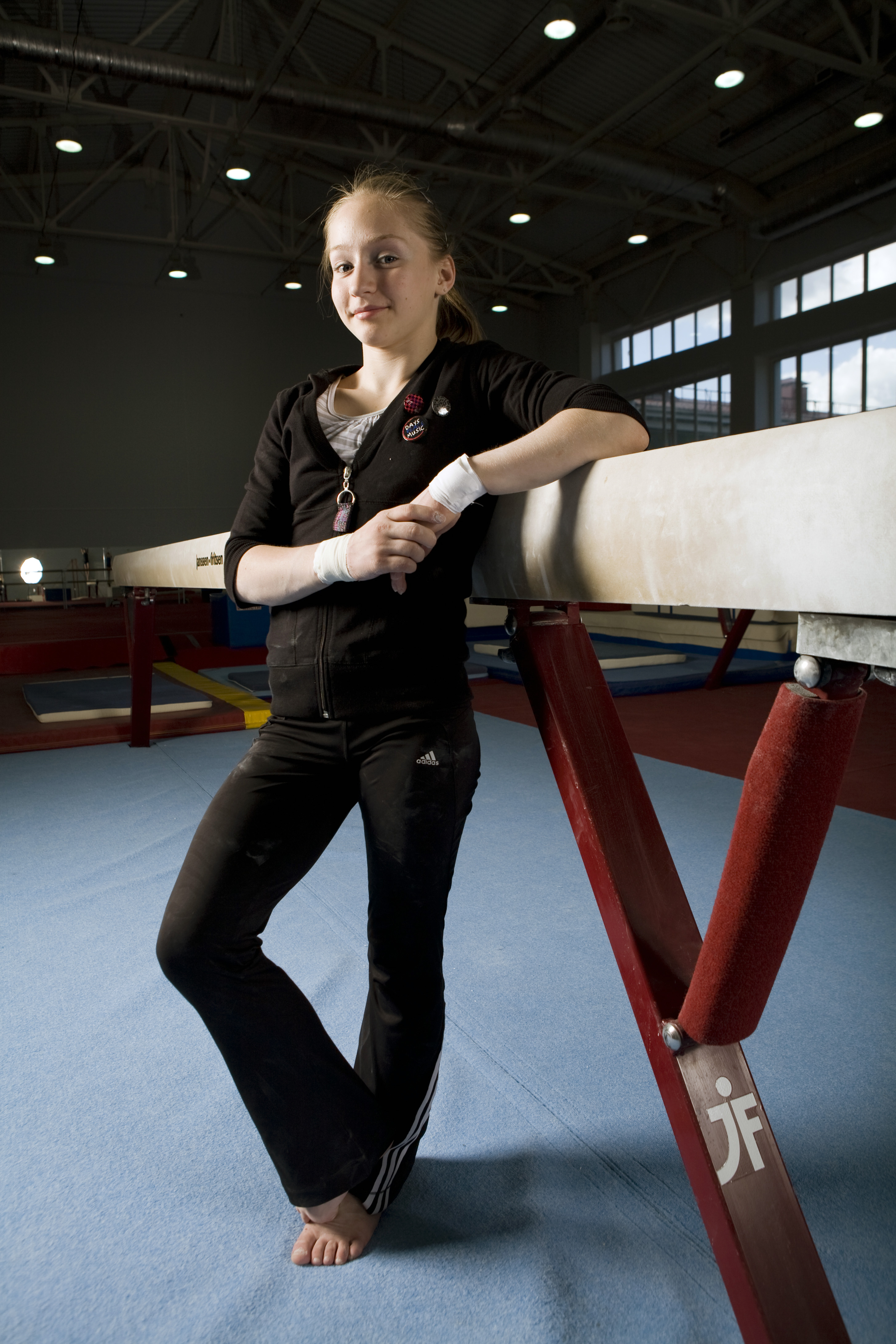
- Semyonova in 2009

Personal information
- Full name: Ksenia Andreyevna Semyonova
- Alternative name: Kseniya
- Born: 20 October 1992 (age 33) Novomoskovsk, Russia
- Height: 154 cm (5 ft 1 in)
- Spouse: Denis Ablyazin (m. 2016; div. 2018)

Gymnastics career
- Discipline: Women's artistic gymnastics
- Country represented: Russia (2006 – 2011)
- Club: CSKA Moscow
- Gym: "Lake Krugloe"
- Head coach: Marina Nazarova
- Assistant coach: Nadezhda Nabokova
- Choreographer: Olga Burova
- Music: Puttin' On The Ritz (2008), Tango Colegiales/Murga Tango(2009-2010), Clubbed To Death (2010-2011)
- Eponymous skills: Beam: Full turn with leg held in back attitude Floor: Double turn with leg held in back attitude
- Retired: 2012
Medal record
Event	1st	2nd	3rd
World Championships	2	0	0
European Championships	4	2	1
Representing Russia
World Championships
Gold medal – first place	2007 Stuttgart	Uneven Bars
Gold medal – first place	2010 Rotterdam	Team
European Championships
Gold medal – first place	2008 Clermont	Uneven Bars
Gold medal – first place	2008 Clermont	Balance Beam
Gold medal – first place	2009 Milan	All-Around
Gold medal – first place	2010 Birmingham	Team
Silver medal – second place	2008 Clermont	Team
Silver medal – second place	2009 Milan	Uneven Bars
Bronze medal – third place	2009 Milan	Floor Exercise

Ksenia Andreyevna Semyonova (Russian: Ксения Андреевна Семёнова; born 20 October 1992) is a retired Russian artistic gymnast. She is the 2007 world champion on the uneven bars, the 2008 European champion on the uneven bars and the balance beam, and the 2009 European all-around champion. She also won a gold medal with the Russian team at the 2010 World Artistic Gymnastics Championships. She represented Russia at the 2008 Summer Olympics where she finished fourth in the team competition, fourth in the all-around, and sixth in the uneven bars final.

== Personal life ==
Semyonova was born on 20 October 1992 in Novomoskovsk, Russia. In September 2016, she married Russian gymnast Denis Ablyazin and on 21 January 2017, she gave birth to their son, Yaroslav Ablyazin. Semyonova and Ablyazin divorced in 2018, with Semyonova having full custody of their son.

== Career ==
=== 2007 ===
Semyonova's initial international success was at the WOGA Classic in January, where she placed first on uneven bars and balance beam. She continued her success as part of the Russian team at the Gymnix International in Montreal, scoring an exceptional 15.95 on uneven bars, blowing away the rest of the field with her world leading start value of 7.2. She also won balance beam with a 15.85 and placed 3rd in floor exercise. In March at the Russian National Championships, she helped the Central region to victory in the team competition, won the uneven bars with 15.975 and took 3rd on beam. Semyonova was unable to compete at the European championships in April but returned to win the uneven bars competition at the Russian Cup in July. Her main competition of the year came at the 2007 World Championships in September, where she succeeded in becoming world champion on the uneven bars, scoring 16.35 over Nastia Liukin and Yang Yilin, making her the first Russian world champion in gymnastics since Svetlana Khorkina in 2003.

=== 2008 ===
Semyonova's first major meet came in April with the European championships, where she helped Russia take silver in the team competition and secured gold in both the uneven bars and the balance beam, with scores of 15.9 and 15.95 respectively. In May she competed at the Moscow Stars World Cup, where she won another gold on the bars, scoring 16.075. Her success continued in June when she finished 2nd at the Dutch Open, behind Anna Pavlova, the two of them leading an all Russian sweep of places first to sixth. Semyonova had problems during the Russian Cup in July, where she fell on beam in qualifications and on vault in the all around final, but she still managed to take silver behind her teammate Afanasyeva.

==== 2008 Summer Olympics ====
Aged just 15, Semyonova represented Russia at the 2008 Summer Olympics and placed fourth in the all-around, just out of medal contention. Semyonova's team was considered to be one of the top four competitive teams (along with China, the USA, and Romania), but narrowly missed an opportunity to medal in Beijing, trailing the third place Romanian team by less than a full point. Semyonova also placed sixth in the uneven bars competition. In the team preliminaries, she placed eighth overall on balance beam; her excellent scores almost qualified her to compete in the balance beam finals. However, only two athletes from each country may compete in the event finals. Her teammates Pavlova and Afanasyeva qualified in sixth and seventh place, edging her out of the competition. Semyonova and Afanasyeva both earned a score of 15.775, but the tie-breaking rules gave the advantage to Afanasyeva. Semyonova competed in the uneven bars finals, placing a respectable 6th, but was left behind the front runners Nastia Liukin, Yang Yilin, He Kexin and Beth Tweddle because of a deficit in start value, which Semyonova had little time to upgrade due to her determination to excel in the all-around competition. Semyonova ended the season with a wrist injury that prevented her from competing at the World Cup finals in Madrid.

=== 2009 ===
Semyonova started her season at the Russian National Championships, where she placed second in the all around to junior Aliya Mustafina. She won the uneven bars and floor exercise to book her place on the European championships squad. Semyonova placed first in the all-around competition at the 2009 European Championships in Milan, Italy, just ahead of her teammate Afanasyeva. In the event finals, she was second on the uneven bars behind Beth Tweddle of the United Kingdom and third on floor, behind Tweddle and the 2006 World Champion, the Italian Vanessa Ferrari. Semyonova also qualified for the balance beam final and finished in fifth place with an uncharacteristically shaky routine. In July she suffered a minor injury to her wrist, keeping her out of the Russian Cup, but was confirmed to the Russian team for the world championships in October along with Yekaterina Kurbatova, Anna Myzdrikova and Afanasyeva, who eventually withdrew due to an injury. After a qualifying round marred by wobbles and a fall on her floor routine, she was 10th going into the all-around but failed to make any event finals. Another fall from the uneven bars during the first rotation prevented her from a better placement and she finished 13th overall.

=== 2010 ===
The season was marred by injuries for Semyonova, who had to sit out the earlier competitions to rest a back injury. Nevertheless, she competed at the European championships in Brussels on floor and beam and qualified for the floor final, from which she eventually gave up her spot to let her teammate Myzdrikova (who went on to win the silver medal) compete. She also contributed to Russia's gold medal in the team final. Semyonova was selected to compete at the World Championships in Rotterdam, again only competing in two events. Whereas her beam routine in the qualifying round was steady and well-executed, she counted two falls in her floor exercise on her opening pass (double layout) and on her double pike. Another steady beam routine helped her team to win Russia's first team world title in history and earned Semyonova her second world title. She retired after the competition due to injuries and growth spurts.

=== Post-competitive career ===
Semyonova has become a meet judge and regularly attends meets that members of the several Russian gymnastics teams compete in. She also helps coach at her old gymnastics club. In September 2016, she married fellow Russian Olympic gymnast Denis Ablyazin, but they have since divorced. They have one son, Yaroslav.

== Routines ==
As of 2009, Semyonova performed the following routines:

Apparatus	Skills	D Score
Vault	Yurchenko 1½	5.3
Uneven Bars	Glide kip cast to HS (KCHS), Stalder shoot to HB (Ray); KCHS, Pike stalder (Inbar) 1½, straddled jaegar; KCHS, Inbar ½, Inbar full, Deltchev; KCHS, Pak salto, KCHS, stadler 1/2 Toe shoot to HB; Toe-on full to piked double Arabian dismount	6.5
Balance Beam	Swing to handstand mount; switch split leap; front aerial, flip-flop, pike back salto; side somi; aerial cartwheel; full turn with leg at Horizontal; sheep jump; onodi, flip-flop, layout stepout; sissone, split jump; roundoff (RO) double pike dismount	6.0
Floor Exercise	Double Layout; 2½ twist punch layout barani; Switch ring, Split leap full; Double turn with leg in attitude (Semyonova); 1½ twist punch layout front full; Double pike dismount	5.6

== Special skills ==
Semyonova performed the "Tkatchev to immediate giant full" combination on the uneven bars and may be the first female gymnast to perform it (but the combination [toe-on] Tkatchev to immediate giant was already performed by former gymnasts like Elise Ray in 2000's or Roza Galieva in 1993). This move is usually done by men on the horizontal bar. She also performed a Deltchev salto on uneven bars, now an unusual skill in the women's sport and an uncommon piked double Arabian dismount.

=== Eponymous skill ===
Semyonova has one eponymous skill listed in the Code of Points.

Apparatus	Name	Description	Difficulty (Note: Valid for the 2025–2028 Code of Points)
Floor exercise	Semenova	2/1 turn (720°) in back attitude (knee of free leg at horizontal throughout turn)	D (0.4)

== Competitive history ==
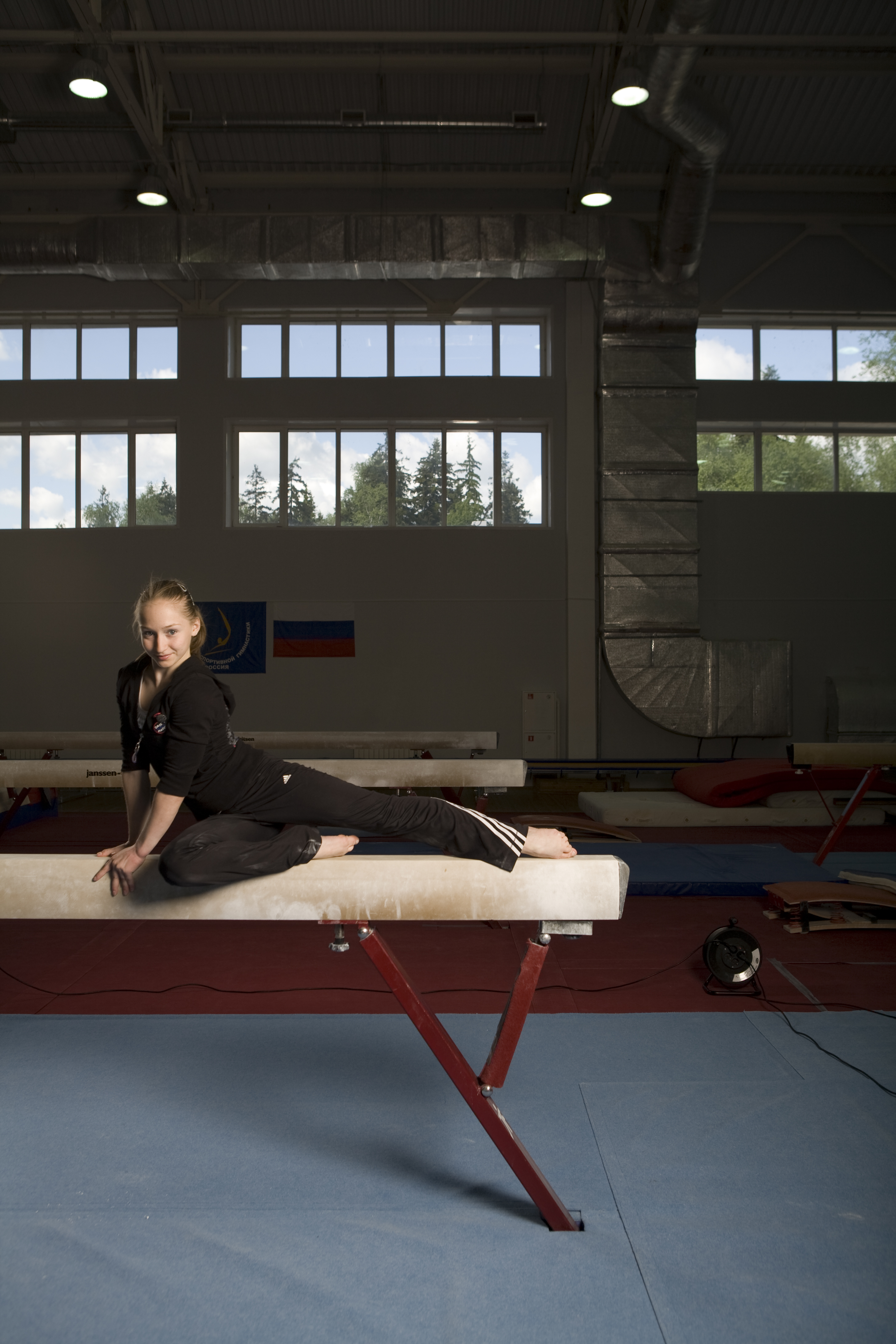
Semyonova in 2009

Year	Event	Team	AA	VT	UB	BB	FX
2007	WOGA Classic		1st	2nd	1st	1st	2nd
2007	International Gymnix				1st	1st	3rd
2007	National Championships	1st			1st	3rd	
2007	Russian Cup				1st		
2007	World Championships	8th			1st		
2008	European Championships	2nd			1st	1st	
2008	Moscow World Cup				1st	4th	
2008	Dutch Open		2nd				
2008	Russian Cup		2nd				
2008	Olympic Games	4th	4th		6th		
2009	National Championships		2nd		1st		1st
2009	European Championships		1st		2nd	5th	3rd
2009	World Championships		13th				
2009	Stuttgart World Cup					3rd	
2010	European Championships	1st					
2010	World Championships	1st					
2011	Russian Cup		9th		8th	8th	

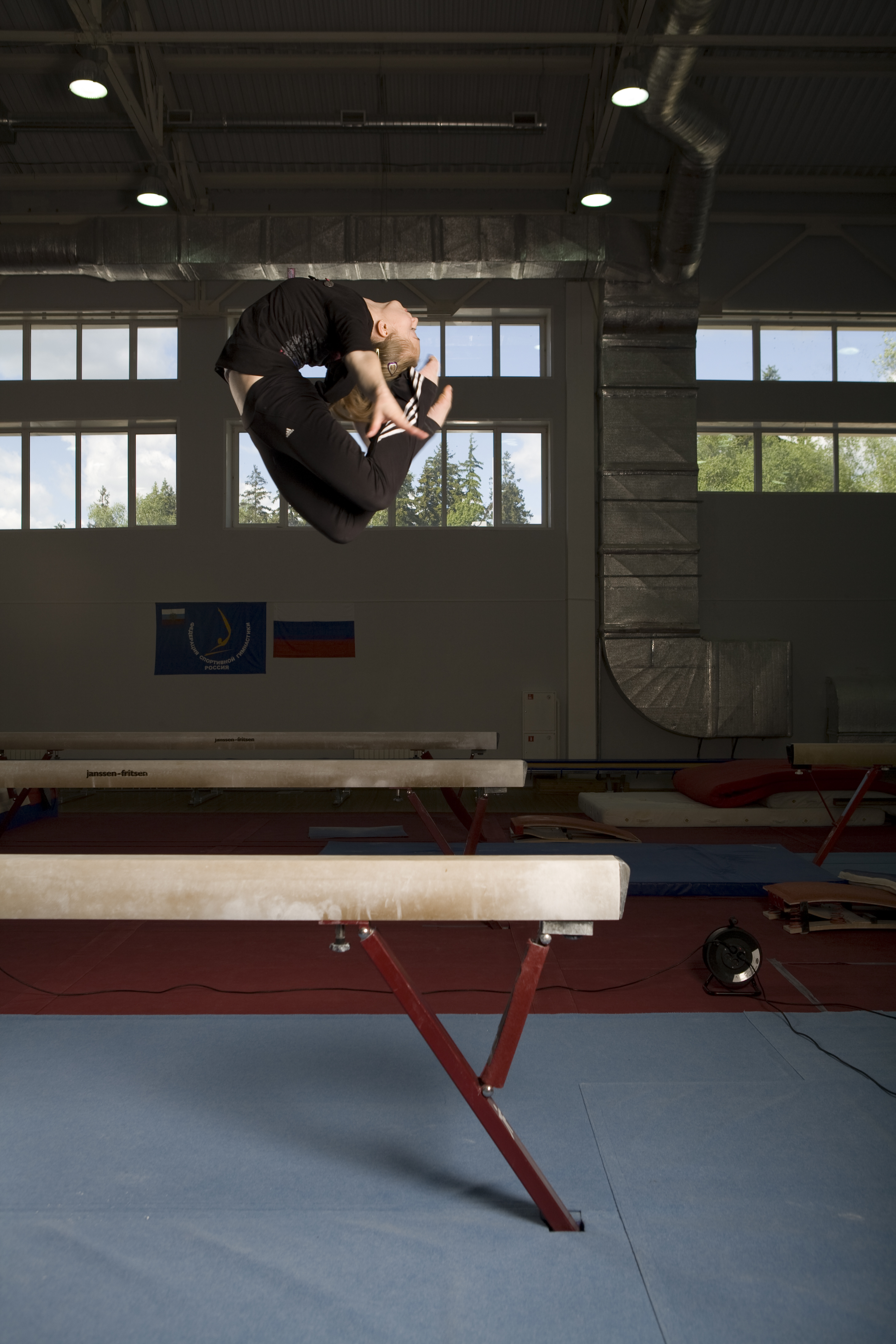
Semyonova performing a sheep jump.

Year	Competition description	Location	Apparatus	Rank-Final	Score-Final	Rank-Qualifying	Score-Qualifying
2007	World Championships	Stuttgart	Team	8	164.525	4	238.000
2007	World Championships	Stuttgart	Uneven bars	1	16.350	1	16.325
2007	World Championships	Stuttgart	Balance beam			14	15.300
2008	European Championships	Clermont-Ferrand	Team	2	179.475	2	176.425
2008	European Championships	Clermont-Ferrand	Uneven bars	1	15.900	2	15.875
2008	European Championships	Clermont-Ferrand	Balance beam	1	15.950	9	15.025
2008	European Championships	Clermont-Ferrand	Floor exercise			16	14.475
2008	Olympic Games	Beijing	Team	4	180.625	3	244.400
2008	Olympic Games	Beijing	All-around	4	61.925	4	61.475
2008	Olympic Games	Beijing	Uneven bars	6	16.325	2	16.475
2008	Olympic Games	Beijing	Balance beam			8	15.775
2008	Olympic Games	Beijing	Floor exercise			29	14.475
2009	European Championships	Milan	All-around	1	58.175	1	57.625
2009	European Championships	Milan	Uneven bars	2	15.500	8	14.425
2009	European Championships	Milan	Balance beam	5	14.125	3	14.475
2009	European Championships	Milan	Floor exercise	3	14.625	4	14.400
2009	World Championships	London	All-around	13	54.525	10	54.900
2009	World Championships	London	Uneven bars			10	14.200
2009	World Championships	London	Balance beam			11	14.075
2009	World Championships	London	Floor exercise			46	12.775
2010	World Championships	Rotterdam	Team	1	175.397	1	234.521
2010	World Championships	Rotterdam	Balance beam			13	14.458
2010	World Championships	Rotterdam	Floor exercise			116	12.566
2010	European Championships	Birmingham	Team	1	169.700	1	168.325
2010	European Championships	Birmingham	Balance beam			17	13.600
2010	European Championships	Birmingham	Floor exercise	WD		5	13.700

== See also ==
- List of Olympic female gymnasts for Russia
