= Maksim Devyatovskiy =

Russian artistic gymnast

- Full name: Maksim Igorevich Devyatovskiy
- Born: 22 April 1984 (age 42) Leninsk-Kuznetsky, Soviet Union
- Height: 166 cm (5 ft 5 in)

Gymnastics career
- Discipline: Men's artistic gymnastics
- Country represented: Russia (2002–2012)
- Club: Dynamo Sports Club
- Gym: "Lake Krugloe"
- Head coach: Igor Deviatovski
- Retired: 2012
Medal record
Men's artistic gymnastics
Representing Russia
World Championships
Silver medal – second place	2006 Aarhus	Team
European Championships
Gold medal – first place	2007 Amsterdam	All around
Gold medal – first place	2008 Lausanne	Team

Maksim Igorevich Devyatovskiy (Russian: Максим Игоревич Девятовский, born 22 April 1984) is a Russian artistic gymnast.

== Career ==
He came 24th at the World Artistic Gymnastics Championships in 2007 and 5th in 2006 in the men's all-around event. Deviatovski won the all-around title at the 2007 European Artistic Gymnastics Championships and the Russian Championships in 2008. At the 2008 Summer Olympics, he finished 6th in the individual All-Around. He won the 2010 American Cup.

== See also ==
- List of Olympic male artistic gymnasts for Russia
