= Anton Golotsutskov =

Russian gymnast (born 1985)

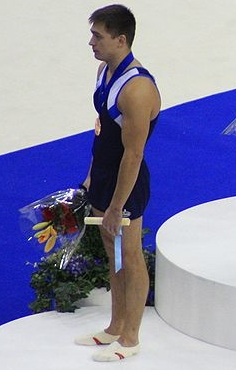

Personal information
- Full name: Anton Sergeyevich Golotsutskov
- Born: 28 July 1985 (age 41) Seversk, Tomsk Oblast, Russian SFSR, Soviet Union
- Height: 164 cm (5 ft 5 in)

Gymnastics career
- Discipline: Men's artistic gymnastics
- Country represented: Russia (2002–2012)
- Club: CSKA Moscow
- Gym: "Lake Krugloe"
- Head coach: Leonid Abramov
- Retired: 2012
Medal record
Men's artistic gymnastics
Representing Russia
Olympic Games
Bronze medal – third place	2008 Beijing	Floor
Bronze medal – third place	2008 Beijing	Vault
World Championships
Silver medal – second place	2010 Rotterdam	Vault
Silver medal – second place	2011 Tokyo	Vault
Bronze medal – third place	2009 London	Vault
European Championships
Gold medal – first place	2006 Volos	Team
Gold medal – first place	2006 Volos	Floor
Gold medal – first place	2007 Amsterdam	Vault
Gold medal – first place	2008 Lausanne	Team
Gold medal – first place	2008 Lausanne	Floor
Silver medal – second place	2012 Montpellier	Team
Bronze medal – third place	2011 Berlin	Vault
Bronze medal – third place	2011 Berlin	Floor

Anton Sergeyevich Golotsutskov (Russian: Антон Серге́евич Голоцуцков, born 28 July 1985) is a retired Russian gymnast.

He won two bronze medals (in floor and vault) at the 2008 Summer Olympics.

== Competitive history ==
Year	Event	Team	AA	FX	PH	SR	VT	PB	HB
2006	European Championships	1st	—N/a	1st			4th		
2007	European Championships	—N/a		5th			1st		
2008	European Championships	1st	—N/a	1st			4th		
2008	Olympic Games	6th		3rd			3rd		
2009
2009	World Championships	—N/a					3rd		
2010
2010	World Championships	6th					2nd		
2011	European Championships	—N/a		3rd			3rd		
2011	World Championships	4th					2nd		
2012	European Championships	2nd	—N/a	8th			7th		

== See also ==
- List of Olympic male artistic gymnasts for Russia
