= Dmitri Stolyarov =

Russian footballer

Personal information
- Full name: Dmitri Sergeyevich Stolyarov
- Date of birth: 6 September 1992 (age 34)
- Height: 1.70 m (5 ft 7 in)
- Positions: Midfielder; defender

Senior career*
Years	Team	Apps	(Gls)
2010	FC Nizhny Novgorod	1	(0)
2012	FC Dynamo Kostroma	8	(0)
2012	FC Metallurg Vyksa	19	(1)
2013–2014	FC Sever Murmansk	30	(1)
2014–2015	FC Volga Tver	29	(6)
2016	FC Shakhtyor Peshelan		
2020–2021	FC Volna Nizhny Novgorod Oblast	11	(2)
- * Club domestic league appearances and goals

Dmitri Sergeyevich Stolyarov (Russian: Дмитрий Серге́евич Столяров; born 6 September 1992) is a Russian former professional football player.

== Club career ==
He made his Russian Football National League debut for FC Nizhny Novgorod on 3 November 2010 in a game against FC Volga Nizhny Novgorod.
