= Igor Pakhomenko =

Russian gymnast

- Full name: Igor Alekseyevich Pakhomenko
- Born: June 10, 1992 (age 34) Novosibirsk, Russia
- Height: 170 cm (5 ft 7 in)

Gymnastics career
- Discipline: Men's artistic gymnastics
- Country represented: Russia

Igor Alekseyevich Pakhomenko (Russian: Игорь Алексеевич Пахоменко; born 10 June 1992) is a Russian gymnast. He competed for the national team at the 2012 Summer Olympics in the Men's artistic team all-around.

== See also ==
- List of Olympic male artistic gymnasts for Russia
