= 2010 World Artistic Gymnastics Championships – Men's qualification =

The 2010 World Artistic Gymnastics Championships was held at the Rotterdam Ahoy indoor sporting arena in the Netherlands. The men's qualification was held on 18 and 19 October 2010. In this year's championships, there was a total of 73 participating federations with 615 gymnasts (343 men and 272 women). 53 men's teams competed.

== Individual all-around ==
Rank	Gymnast	Nation	Floor (gymnastics)	Pommel horse	Rings (gymnastics)	Vault (gymnastics)	Parallel bars	Horizontal bar	Total	Qual.
1	Kōhei Uchimura	Japan	14.966	15.133	15.400	16.333	15.366	15.033	92.231	Q
2	Philipp Boy	Germany	14.766	14.200	14.566	15.800	15.258	15.566	90.156	Q
3	Lü Bo	China	14.633	14.000	14.966	15.933	15.341	14.766	89.639	Q
4	Jonathan Horton	United States	14.700	13.733	15.233	15.900	14.766	15.266	89.598	Q
5	Daniel Purvis	Great Britain	15.266	14.600	14.200	16.066	14.833	14.533	89.498	Q
6	Yoo Won-chul	South Korea	14.416	14.200	15.466	15.400	14.841	15.100	89.423	Q
7	Flavius Koczi	Romania	15.000	14.966	14.700	16.166	14.833	13.733	89.398	Q
8	Sergey Khorokhordin	Russia	14.400	14.566	14.900	15.700	15.175	14.500	89.241	Q
9	Teng Haibin	China	14.200	14.783	14.166	15.866	15.633	14.533	89.181	Q
10	Samuel Hunter	Great Britain	14.800	14.708	14.366	15.900	14.650	14.666	89.090	Q
11	Mykola Kuksenkov	Ukraine	14.366	14.100	14.600	15.866	15.133	14.766	88.831	Q
12	Danell Leyva	United States	13.900	13.900	14.433	15.658	15.233	15.633	88.757	Q
13	Koji Uematsu	Japan	13.266	14.133	14.733	15.433	15.400	15.733	88.698	Q
14	Luis Rivera	Puerto Rico	14.433	14.500	14.733	16.233	14.100	14.300	88.299	Q
15	Steven Legendre	United States	15.233	13.700	14.333	15.991	14.633	14.266	88.156	-
16	Kenya Kobayashi	Japan	14.133	13.833	15.433	14.933	15.175	14.633	88.140	-
17	Kristian Thomas	Great Britain	14.500	14.275	14.366	15.800	14.033	14.866	87.840	-
18	Maxim Devyatovskiy	Russia	14.666	13.666	14.866	14.933	15.000	14.600	87.731	Q
19	Ruslan Panteleymonov	Great Britain	14.533	13.966	14.533	15.866	14.733	14.066	87.697	-
20	Eugen Spiridonov	Germany	14.366	14.300	14.300	15.366	14.666	14.633	87.631	Q
21	Andrey Cherkasov	Russia	14.400	13.700	14.166	16.100	14.716	14.333	87.415	-
22	Cyril Tommasone	France	14.066	15.500	14.000	15.166	14.233	14.450	87.415	Q
23	Alexander Shatilov	Israel	15.308	14.466	14.066	15.666	14.700	13.133	87.339	Q
24	Tomás González	Chile	14.933	13.533	14.650	15.933	14.433	13.733	87.215	Q
25	Sergio Muñoz	Spain	14.300	14.300	14.800	16.100	13.233	14.366	87.099	Q
26	Luis Vargas Velásquez	Puerto Rico	12.916	14.500	14.400	15.566	14.900	14.700	86.982	Q
27	Dzmitry Savitski	Belarus	14.200	14.500	14.358	15.600	14.508	13.766	86.932	Q
28	Anton Fokin	Uzbekistan	13.900	14.300	14.766	15.400	15.233	13.300	86.899	Q
29	Kim Soo-myun	South Korea	14.400	14.325	13.966	16.000	14.733	13.366	86.790	Q
30	Koji Yamamuro	Japan	11.100	13.700	15.633	16.300	15.000	14.966	86.699	-
31	Ildar Valeiev	Kazakhstan	14.066	14.033	14.600	14.566	15.366	13.800	86.431	R
32	Jorge Hugo Giraldo	Colombia	13.600	13.666	14.733	15.333	14.866	14.133	86.331	R
33	David Belyavskiy	Russia	14.533	14.641	12.500	16.166	13.800	14.666	86.306	-
34	Joshua Jefferis	Australia	13.966	12.933	14.800	15.733	14.800	14.000	86.232	R
35	Nathan Gafuik	Canada	14.100	13.500	13.833	15.966	14.700	14.133	86.232	R
36	Enrico Pozzo	Italy	14.1	14.166	13.9	15.766	14.266	14.033	86.231	
37	Matteo Morandi	Italy	14.066	13.7	15.5	16.066	12.866	14	86.198	
38	Roman Kulesza	Poland	13.633	13.241	13.966	15.5	14.933	14.866	86.139	
39	Paolo Ottavi	Italy	14	13.9	14.866	15.033	14.1	14.2	86.099	
40	Roman Gisi	Switzerland	13.666	14.1	13.933	15.7	14.1	14.566	86.065	
41	Hamilton Sabot	France	14.108	14.666	14.5	14.408	13.566	14.733	85.981	
42	Jeffrey Wammes	Netherlands	14.7	12.933	14.4	16.4	12.3	15.166	85.899	
43	Claudio Capelli	Switzerland	14.033	13.266	13.9	15.991	15.241	13.266	85.697	
44	Ovidiu Buidoso	Romania	12.733	14.833	14	15.6	14.3	14.166	85.632	
45	Matthias Fahrig	Germany	13.666	13.466	13.8	16.1	14.5	14.066	85.598	
46	Sergio Sasaki Junior	Brazil	14.366	13.8	14.033	15	14.3	13.966	85.465	
47	Jayd Lukenchuk	Canada	13.966	13.166	13.766	15.9	14.433	14.133	85.364	
48	Cristian Ioan Bataga	Romania	14.333	14.341	14.366	14.233	14.266	13.733	85.272	
49	Oleg Stepko	Ukraine	14.3	14.4	13.666	16	14.5	12.366	85.232	
50	Manuel Almeida Campos	Portugal	12.9	13.833	14.433	14.933	14.666	14.333	85.098	
51	Angel Ramos Rivera	Puerto Rico	13.333	14.133	13.733	16.066	13.966	13.866	85.097	
52	Bart Deurloo	Netherlands	14.233	12.6	13.666	15.866	14.5	14.133	84.998	
53	Samuel Piasecký	Slovakia	13.433	12.8	13.366	15.3	15.366	14.666	84.931	
54	Mattia Tamiazzo	Italy	13.608	14.466	13.333	15.3	13.966	14.033	84.706	
55	Oleksandr Suprun	Ukraine	14.266	12.066	13.6	16.2	14.466	14.066	84.664	
56	Filip Ude	Croatia	14	15.5	12.733	15.466	14.075	12.766	84.54	
57	Daniel Groves	Switzerland	12.8	14.066	13.566	15.6	14.1	14.4	84.532	
58	Federico Molinari	Argentina	13.866	12.9	14.833	15.083	14.366	13.383	84.431	
59	Mosiah Brentano Rodrigues	Brazil	13.833	14.1	12.966	15.316	14.1	14.1	84.415	
60	Yernar Yerimbetov	Kazakhstan	13.633	13.2	13.433	15.516	14.366	14.066	84.214	
61	Gustavo Palma Simoes	Portugal	13.833	13.566	14.733	15.166	14.166	12.7	84.164	
62	Manuel Carballo	Spain	12.966	13.1	14.833	15.691	13.683	13.866	84.139	
63	Samuel Offord	Australia	13.833	11.966	14.8	15.433	14.133	13.9	84.065	
64	José Luis Fuentes	Venezuela	12.2	14.641	13.233	15.125	14.4	14.466	84.065	
65	Fabian Leimlehner	Austria	12.133	13.433	14.133	15.6	14.233	14.5	84.032	
66	Vid Hidvégi	Hungary	12.666	14.833	14.066	14.6	14.25	13.566	83.981	
67	Martin Konečný	Czech Republic	13.766	13.733	13.933	15.091	13.266	13.966	83.755	
68	Santiago Lopez Viana	Mexico	14.533	13.566	13.266	15.558	13.733	13.033	83.689	
69	Didier Yamit Lugo Sichaca	Colombia	14.333	11.966	14.2	15.533	14.633	12.8	83.465	
70	Seob Sin	South Korea	13.8	13.866	14.366	15.2	13	13.133	83.365	
71	Christos Lympanovnos	Greece	13.633	12.733	13.6	15.358	14.1	13.8	83.224	
72	Stepan Gorbachev	Kazakhstan	14.166	13.733	13.733	15.583	12.766	13.066	83.047	
73	Luke Wiwatowski	Australia	13.233	13.366	12.266	15.533	14.2	14.433	83.031	
74	Francisco Carlos Barretto Junior	Brazil	12.9	13.766	13.1	15.2	13.7	14.066	82.732	
75	Artsiom Bykau	Belarus	12.933	12.4	14	15.2	14.416	13.766	82.715	
76	Wai-Hung Shek	Hong Kong	13.266	13.5	12.9	14.966	14.2	13.633	82.465	
77	Patrick Peng	New Zealand	13.683	11.766	13.95	15.5	14	13.533	82.432	
78	Mohamed Sherif El Saharty	Egypt	13.666	12.933	13.533	15.666	13.433	13.2	82.431	
79	Eddie Penev	Bulgaria	15.066	11.9	13.666	16.2	12.433	12.9	82.165	
80	Michel Bletterman	Netherlands	13.866	12.933	13.15	14.566	13.9	13.7	82.115	
81	Felix Aronovich	Israel	12.7	13.933	14.2	13.7	13.958	13.466	81.957	
82	Zoltán Kállai	Hungary	12.3	14.633	13.5	14.5	13.6	13.266	81.799	
83	Joachim Hancheolsen	Norway	12.8	13.7	13.233	14.758	13.466	13.6	81.557	
84	Miguel Monreal Hernandez	Mexico	13.8	13.466	14.133	13.9	13.533	12.7	81.532	
85	Marko Brez	Croatia	13.333	13.7	13.333	14.533	12.933	13.7	81.532	
86	Mans Stenberg	Sweden	14.2	10.833	13.8	15.766	13.6	13.3	81.499	
87	Dmitrijs Trefilovs	Latvia	13.566	12.933	13.7	13.633	13.6	14.066	81.498	
88	Charalampos Kailidis	Greece	13.033	13.466	13.433	14.633	13.016	13.9	81.481	
89	Osvaldo Martínez Erazun	Argentina	13.058	11.666	14.3	14.333	14.1	13.866	81.323	
90	Csaba Nyers	Hungary	13.466	12.3	13.566	14.9	13.366	13.6	81.198	
91	James Brochero Gary	Colombia	13.6	13.6	12.633	15.275	13.9	12.133	81.141	
92	Tomas Thys	Belgium	13.85	11.933	13.333	15.5	12.8	13.633	81.049	
93	Jimmy Verbaeys	Belgium	12.533	13.4	13.266	14.933	12.866	14.008	81.006	
94	Gilles Gentges	Belgium	13.533	12.866	13.666	14.775	12.7	13.366	80.906	
95	Luke Carson	Ireland	13.266	13	13.5	14.516	13.7	12.9	80.882	
96	Petr Smejkal	Czech Republic	12.866	12.566	13.5	15.2	13.133	13.5	80.765	
97	Simao Almeida	Portugal	13.833	11.266	14.066	15.233	14.3	12.033	80.731	
98	Hadi Khenarinezhad	Iran	13.933	12.633	14.7	14.8	13.3	11.3	80.666	
99	Thomas Neuteleers	Belgium	12.366	11.466	14	14.633	14.525	13.666	80.656	
100	Rokas Guščinas	Lithuania	12.466	13.833	14.466	14.366	11.933	13.5	80.564	
101	Juan Manuel Lompizano	Argentina	13.966	12.7	12.266	15.166	13.433	12.633	80.164	
102	Heikki Niva	Finland	13.866	11.833	12.866	14.933	13.466	13.1	80.064	
103	Lukas Kranzlmueller	Austria	13.633	11.933	13.533	14.9	12.4	13.566	79.965	
104	Sascha Palgen	Luxembourg	12.966	10.016	14.533	14.933	13.866	13.633	79.947	
105	Minh Sang Truong	Vietnam	13.066	13.566	12.833	13.333	14.066	12.966	79.83	
106	Mikhail Koudinov	New Zealand	14.133	13.033	13.833	13.3	12.541	12.966	79.806	
107	Matthias Schwab	Austria	13.333	12.641	13.233	14.533	12.833	13.133	79.706	
108	Attila Vlacsil	Hungary	12.633	13.166	13.8	14.666	13.666	11.766	79.697	
109	Maciej Labutin	Poland	12.633	12.916	13.533	14.466	13.233	12.866	79.647	
110	Shakir Shikhaliyev	Azerbaijan	12.366	13.133	13.125	15.3	12.5	13.1	79.524	
111	Weena Chokpaoumpai	Thailand	13.366	11.566	13.3	15.6	13.433	12.033	79.298	
112	Michal Boltnar	Czech Republic	13.366	11.733	12.883	14.858	13.133	13.166	79.139	
113	Mahmood Alsadi	Qatar	12.6	12.7	13.1	14.833	13.333	12.533	79.099	
114	Ferhat Arıcan	Turkey	13.333	12.866	13.358	14.4	12.266	12.858	79.081	
115	Stavros Kekelos	Greece	12.4	11.633	13.525	14.4	13.566	13.533	79.057	
116	Mohammad Ramezanpour	Iran	13.533	13.8	12.4	14.533	13.2	11.533	78.999	
117	X. Veloz Perez	Venezuela	12.3	12.9	13.033	15.1	13.033	12.633	78.999	
118	Chih Yu Chen	Chinese Taipei	12.033	11.233	15.466	14.1	13.133	12.966	78.931	
119	Ümit Şamiloğlu	Turkey	13.466	12.433	12.2	15.466	12.633	12.633	78.831	
120	Jevgenij Izmodenov	Lithuania	13.266	12.633	12.966	14.5	13.066	12.166	78.597	
121	Noam Shaham	Israel	13.633	10.4	14.133	15.5	13.533	11.3	78.499	
122	Filip Borosa	Croatia	13.733	12.216	12.433	14.533	13.133	12.433	78.481	
123	Matija Baron	Croatia	13.366	13.3	12.766	14.366	11.733	12.9	78.431	
124	Szu Chieh Chen	Chinese Taipei	12.933	13.833	11.466	14.633	13.3	12.2	78.365	
125	Mohamed Sayed Srour	Egypt	12.933	11.233	13.741	15.3	13.3	11.566	78.073	
126	Woranad Kaewpanya	Thailand	12.766	11.933	11.666	15.566	13	12.333	77.264	
127	Mostafa Mohamed Khaled	Egypt	12.866	11.391	13.3	14.766	12.966	11.866	77.155	
128	Martin Barrionuevo	Argentina	13.333	11.633	13.116	14.566	12.133	12.333	77.114	
129	Amir Azami	Iran	13.033	10.733	14.066	14.6	12.466	12.166	77.064	
130	Rartchawat Kaewpanya	Thailand	12.966	11.866	12.566	14.733	13.666	11.266	77.063	
131	Xheni Dyrmishi	Austria	11.733	11.733	13.166	14.766	12.733	12.866	76.997	
132	Toni Simonen	Sweden	12.5	10.8	13.333	15.333	13.333	11.666	76.965	
133	Marcus Conradi	Norway	13.2	12.466	12.1	14.366	12.233	12.466	76.831	
134	Alexander Windfeld-Hellsten	Denmark	12.433	12.033	12.6	14.4	12.458	12.666	76.59	
135	Joachim Winther	Denmark	12.666	10.3	12.491	14.633	12.966	13.375	76.431	
136	Ivan Olushev	Uzbekistan	12.733	10.566	12.233	15.5	13.233	12.066	76.331	
137	Ozgur Sanli	Turkey	12.8	10.333	12.7	14.566	13	12.9	76.299	
138	Chenglong Zhang	China	14.1	14.366		15.9	15.466	15.766	75.598	
139	Johny Parra Marana	Venezuela	12	12.833	10.566	14.6	12.6	12.966	75.565	
140	Muhammed Akkavak	Turkey	13.033	11.5	12.366	14.666	11.566	12.4	75.531	
141	Jose Alejandro Manama Castillo	Venezuela	11.9	11.6	11.766	14.966	13.466	11.833	75.531	
142	Nam Dang	Vietnam	12.666	11.6	13.166	14.533	10.966	12.266	75.197	
143	Anthony O'Donnell	Ireland	13.141	10.133	12.4	14.433	12.408	12.583	75.098	
144	Florin Purge	Denmark	10.733	11.233	13.166	14.433	12.2	12.783	74.548	
145	Jesus Vidal de Leon de Jesus	Dominican Republic	12.5	9.933	11.966	14.833	12.133	13.1	74.465	
146	Christopher Brooks	United States	13.966	14.033		15.933	14.908	15.5	74.34	
147	Ahmed Aldayani	Qatar	10.233	11.5	12.5	13.266	13.466	13.333	74.298	
148	Ali Al Asi	Jordan	12.066	10.133	15.133	14.566	11.166	11.2	74.264	
149	Gaël Da Silva	France	14.766		14.2	15.7	14.566	14.866	74.098	
150	Michael Makings	South Africa	12.533	11	12.466	14.866	12.2	10.933	73.998	
151	Kevin Lytwyn	Canada	13.733		14.6	15.933	14.433	14.833	73.532	
152	Dzmitry Kaspiarovich	Belarus	13.966		14.433	16.333	14.733	14.033	73.498	
153	Oualid Hacib	Algeria	12.8	12.166	12.733	11.333	12.633	11.666	73.331	
154	Ivan San Miguel	Spain		13.566	15.4	16.1	14	14.2	73.266	
155	Arnaud Willig	France		14.233	14.533	15.2	14.7	14.4	73.066	
156	Javier Gómez Fuertes	Spain	14.666		14.733	15.8	14.866	12.966	73.031	
157	Changju Ha	South Korea		15	13.933	15.633	14.3	13.833	72.699	
158	Brandon Wynn	United States	13.933		15.4	15.833	13.2	14.066	72.432	
159	Hellal Metidji	Algeria	12.633	12.866	10.5	14.266	11.566	10.333	72.164	
160	Alexander Rodríguez	Puerto Rico	14.3	14.333		15.2	13.6	14.233	71.666	
161	Vitaliy Nakonechnyy	Ukraine	13.833	14.433	13.866		14.566	14.633	71.331	
162	Naser Alothman	Kuwait	11.9	11.4	10.4	14.066	12.3	10.9	70.966	
163	Danilo Nogueira	Brazil		13.566	14.4	14.8	13.908	14.066	70.74	
164	Thomas Pichler	Australia	14.825		11.833	15.733	14	14.1	70.491	
165	Jonas Toeback	Belgium	13.633		14.1	15.383	13.491	13.666	70.273	
166	Kiu Chung Ng	Hong Kong	11.566	10.433	13.166	14.433	10.3	10	69.898	
167	Adrian Bucur	Romania	14.166	14	14.8		13.966	12.966	69.898	
168	Adam Mihok	Hungary	13.666		13.4	15.3	13.733	13.733	69.832	
169	Abdullah Abdulrada	Kuwait	12.7	10.533	9.066	13.716	12.033	11.666	69.714	
170	Roberto Alejandro Fiallos Orellana	El Salvador	12	9.733	12.166	14.566	11.5	9.7	69.665	
171	Aliaksandr Dziamchykhin	Belarus	14.233	13.566	14.366	13.8	13.533		69.498	
172	Luke Wadsworth	Australia	13.333	13.166		15.666	13.7	13.425	69.29	
173	Mohammad Ali	Kuwait	12.266	9.066	10.533	13.633	12.033	11.6	69.131	
174	Eduard Shaulov	Uzbekistan	13.566	13.466		15.4	13.433	13.266	69.131	
175	Jackson Payne	Canada	13.566	12.2	14.1		14.366	14.8	69.032	
176	Mark Ramseier	Switzerland	13.133	12.433	14.3	14.466	14.266		68.598	
177	Pavel Bulauski	Belarus	14.066	12.4	13.933	15.033		13.1	68.532	
178	Arjen Butter	Netherlands	13.933	11.733	14.291	15.166	13.4		68.523	
179	Pericles Fouro da Silva	Brazil	13.733	13.866	12.566		14.366	13.766	68.297	
180	Phạm Phước Hưng	Vietnam	13.55	13	13.666		13.7	13.733	67.649	
181	Przemyslaw Lis	Poland	11.633		13.433	14.433	14	13.966	67.465	
182	Nurtas Kozhakov	Kazakhstan	12.766	13.066		14.541	13.133	13.5	67.006	
183	Alexander Khamudis	Israel	12.966		13.033	14.566	13.666	12.6	66.831	
184	James Hennin	New Zealand		11.933	13.266	14.583	13.333	13.633	66.748	
185	Ping Chien Hsu	Chinese Taipei	12.333	14	13.3		13.366	13.7	66.699	
186	Ehsan Khodadaditirkolaei	Iran	13.1		12.9	13.958	13.633	13.066	66.657	
187	Otabek Masharipov	Uzbekistan	13.633	13.5	13.3		13.3	12.916	66.649	
188	Aldo Torres Laveaga	Mexico	12.7		12.8	14.633	13.333	13.058	66.524	
189	Marius Wirum Haaverstad	Norway	12.008		12.733	14.533	13.233	13.933	66.44	
190	Abdel Rahman Sobhy	Egypt	13.5	11.933		14.516	13.366	13.066	66.381	
191	Velislav Valchev	Bulgaria	13.166	10.833	13.983	14.5		13.633	66.115	
192	Nicolás Córdoba	Argentina		11.7	13.433	14.466	12.933	13.566	66.098	
193	Cuong Hoang	Vietnam	12.3	11.333		14.833	13.333	13.2	64.999	
194	Yi Chieh Lin	Chinese Taipei	11.533	12.466	12.933	14.933	12.966		64.831	
195	Yaroslav Vovk	Bulgaria		11.291	13.6	14.333	13.7	11.766	64.69	
196	Ilkka Kuusela	Finland	12.533	13.108	12.733		12.766	13.433	64.573	
197	Kamil Hulboj	Poland	11.833	12.5		15.5	13.6	11.133	64.566	
198	Stian Skjerahaug	Norway	12.3	11.866		14.866	12.4	13.066	64.498	
199	Brandon Field	New Zealand	12.908		11.233	14.833	12.966	11.866	63.806	
200	Jarkko Harju	Finland	12.6	10.766		14.533	12.866	12.5	63.265	
201	Zhe Feng	China	14			16.433	15.866	15.266	61.565	
202	Markku Leinonen	Finland		10.933	14.525	14.466	10.233	11.4	61.557	
203	Joao Fuglsig	Denmark	11.966	11.666		13.8	12.733	10.1	60.265	
204	Theo Seager	United Kingdom	14.808		14.7	15.933		14.466	59.907	
205	Fabian Hambuechen	Germany		13.933	14.8		15.433	15.7	59.866	
206	Yibing Chen	China		14.066	15.966	16		13.633	59.665	
207	Jiří Veselý	Czech Republic	12.2		11.5	13.816	11.108	10.733	59.357	
208	Hak Seon Yang	South Korea	14.033		14.666	16.433	14.2		59.332	
209	Thomas Taranu	Germany	14.633		15.266	15.066		14	58.965	
210	Eleftherios Kosmidis	Greece	15.466		14.133	15.466	13.366		58.431	
211	Kenneth Ikeda	Canada		13.466		15.233	15.2	14.066	57.965	
212	Aleksandar Batinkov	Bulgaria	14.233			15.6	14.1	13.933	57.866	
213	Casey Sandy	Canada	14.166	14.3	13.866	15.533			57.865	
214	Pablo Braegger	Switzerland	14.133		13.566	15.666		14.333	57.698	
215	Sebastian Krimmer	Germany	13.866	13.633		15.666	14.5		57.665	
216	Rafael Morales-Casado	Puerto Rico	14.3	14.266	13.133	15.433			57.132	
217	Igor Pakhomenko	Russia		14.466	14.166		14.1	14.333	57.065	
218	Tomi Tuuha	Finland	13.866		13.666	16.266	13.133		56.931	
219	Nguyễn Hà Thanh	Vietnam	13.8			16.133	13.6	12.733	56.266	
220	Thomas Bouhail	France	14.966	12.8		16.366	12.108		56.24	
221	Mark Holyoake	New Zealand	13.766	13.533		15.2	13.566		56.065	
222	Sheng Meng Huang	Chinese Taipei			14.866	14.7	13.333	13.141	56.04	
223	Marek Lyszczarz	Poland	13.433	12.933	14	15.233			55.599	
224	Filip Yanev	Bulgaria		13.233	14.033		13.833	14.441	55.54	
225	Ravshanbek Osimov	Uzbekistan			13.333	14.633	13.966	13.533	55.465	
226	Deivy Castellanos Garcia	Colombia	13.433		13.933		14.733	13.366	55.465	
227	Oleksandr Yakubovs'Kyi	Ukraine	14.425			16.133	14.266	10.533	55.357	
228	Daulet Narmetov	Uzbekistan	12.466	14.633	13.3	14.833			55.232	
229	Isaac Botella Pérez	Spain	14.866	10.016	14.6	15.733			55.215	
230	Fabian Gonzalez	Spain	14.666	13.9			11.766	14.533	54.865	
231	Bernardo Loy Da Garcia	Portugal		13.366	12.9	14.516		13.966	54.748	
232	Javier Cervantes Quezada	Mexico	13.4	13.366	12.766	15.166			54.698	
233	Carlo van Minde	Netherlands	11.6		13.8	15.6		13.266	54.266	
234	Ricardo Martins	Portugal	12.933		13.033		13.833	13.266	53.065	
235	Adam Kierzkowski	Poland		10.633	14		15.366	12.9	52.899	
236	Diogo Lopes Romero	Portugal	13.1	12.466		14.4	12.8		52.766	
237	Lars Jorgen Fjeld	Norway	12.633	11.9	13.066	14.933			52.532	
238	Islam Mohamed Shahin	Egypt	12.866	13.6	12.833		12.9		52.199	
239	Eduard Gholub	Israel	12.666	10.7	14.133	14.366			51.865	
240	Matthew Palmer	New Zealand	13.433	11.533	13.966			12.7	51.632	
241	Ilya Kornev	Kazakhstan		11.866	13.1		13.633	13	51.599	
242	Yu Chen Tu	Chinese Taipei	11.3	11.3		15.333		12.733	50.666	
243	Jossimar Calvo	Colombia		12	12.466		12.433	13.333	50.232	
244	Espen Inge Jansen	Norway		10	12.9		13.366	13.1	49.366	
245	Younes Zeyghami	Iran	12.366	11.233			13.866	11.9	49.365	
246	Mingyong Yan	China		14.633	15.7		15		45.333	
247	Matteo Angioletti	Italy	14.1		15.366	15.866			45.332	
248	Tatsuki Nakashima	Japan	14.466	15.166		15.333			44.965	
249	Kazuhito Tanaka	Japan			15		15.066	14.7	44.766	
250	Epke Zonderland	Netherlands		13.933			15.333	15.325	44.591	
251	Alberto Busnari	Italy		15.166			14.233	14.2	43.599	
252	Marius Daniel Berbecar	Romania		12.666		15.766	15		43.432	
253	Vlasios Maras	Greece		13.666		15.491		14.166	43.323	
254	Aliaksandr Tsarevich	Belarus		14.4			14.858	13.933	43.191	
255	Ali Alsaffar	Kuwait		10.433	11.433		11.133	10.066	43.065	
256	Jihoon Kim	South Korea	14.333	13.466				15.166	42.965	
257	Pascal Bucher	Switzerland		14.1			14.333	14.5	42.933	
258	Daniel Corral Barron	Mexico		14.275	14.191		14.3		42.766	
259	Marian Drăgulescu	Romania	14.3			15.8		12.433	42.533	
260	Tommy Ramos	Puerto Rico			15.233		13.833	13.433	42.499	
261	Jorge Yesid Pena Castiblanco	Colombia	12.833	14.391		15.233			42.457	
262	Yordan Yovchev	Bulgaria	13.866		14.9		13.6		42.366	
263	Stanislav Valeiev	Kazakhstan	13.233		13.3	15.566			42.099	
264	Helge Vammen	Denmark	13.3	13.1		15.6			42	
265	Marco Baldauf	Austria		12.433		14.7		14.866	41.999	
266	Regulo Carmona	Venezuela	12.566		14.266	14.833			41.665	
267	Jindrich Pansky	Czech Republic	13.533	0	12.666	15.1			41.299	
268	Vahid Izadfar	Iran		13.5	13.133	14.466			41.099	
269	Andriy Isayev	Ukraine		10.7	14.333	16.033			41.066	
270	Luis Sosa Abarca	Mexico		13.766			13.166	13.733	40.665	
271	Hau Trung Linh	Vietnam		12.333	12.2	15.633			40.166	
272	Pavel Gofman	Israel		12.3			13.9	13.833	40.033	
273	Alexander Leidlmair	Austria	13.466		13.3		13		39.766	
274	Ahmed Adel Ibrahim	Egypt			12.666	14.4		12.633	39.699	
275	Sakari Vekki	Finland	14.033			13.8		11.7	39.533	
276	Nashwan Haidar Al-Harazi	Yemen	11.633	12.166		15.266			39.065	
277	Kieran Behan	Ireland			13.333		13.033	11.5	37.866	
278	Jiri Bomer	Czech Republic		13.533			12.066	12.2	37.799	
279	Michail Doulkeridis	Greece	10.8				14.033	12.9	37.733	
280	Anton Golotsutskov	Russia	14.033			16.55			30.583	
281	Prashanth Sellathurai	Australia		15.566	14.666				30.232	
282	Louis Smith	United Kingdom		15.3			14.266		29.566	
283	Christopher Cameron	United States		14.333	13.866				28.199	
284	Felipe Goncalves Polato	Brazil	11.966			15.566			27.532	
285	Benoit Caranobe	France	12.2					14.166	26.366	
286	Paata Nozadze	Georgia		11.966	11.766				23.732	
287	Krisztián Berki	Hungary		15.9					15.9	
288	Donna Donny Truyens	Belgium		15.416					15.416	
289	Sašo Bertoncelj	Slovenia		15.4					15.4	
290	Harutyum Merdinyan	Armenia		15.333					15.333	
291	Mitja Petkovšek	Slovenia					15.233		15.233	
292	Marijo Možnik	Croatia						15.233	15.233	
293	Robert Seligman	Croatia		15.2					15.2	
294	Wajdi Bouallègue	Tunisia				14.683			14.683	
295	Jevgēņijs Saproņenko	Latvia				14.633			14.633	
296	Irodotos Georgallas	Cyprus			14.366				14.366	
297	Mathias Lee Hansen	Denmark			14.3				14.3	
298	Jian Zhong	Hong Kong			12.7				12.7	
299	Mario Gorosito	Argentina	11.766						11.766	

== Floor exercise ==
Rank	Gymnast	Nation	D Score	E Score	Pen.	Total	Qual.
1	Eleftherios Kosmidis	Greece	6.500	8.966		15.466	Q
2	Alexander Shatilov	Israel	6.500	8.808		15.308	Q
3	Daniel Purvis	Great Britain	6.500	8.766		15.266	Q
4	Steven Legendre	United States	6.700	8.533		15.233	Q
5	Eddie Penev	Bulgaria	6.500	8.566		15.066	Q
6	Flavius Koczi	Romania	6.300	8.700		15.000	Q
7	Thomas Bouhail	France	6.100	8.866		14.966	Q
8	Kōhei Uchimura	Japan	6.500	8.466		14.966	Q
9	Tomás González	Chile	6.400	8.533		14.933	R
10	Isaac Botella	Spain	6.300	8.566		14.866	R
11	Thomas Pichler	Australia	6.100	8.725		14.825	R

== Pommel horse ==
Rank	Gymnast	Nation	D Score	E Score	Pen.	Total	Qual.
1	Krisztián Berki	Hungary	6.700	9.200		15.900	Q
2	Prashanth Sellathurai	Australia	6.600	8.966		15.566	Q
3	Cyril Tommasone	France	6.400	9.100		15.500	Q
4	Filip Ude	Croatia	6.500	9.000		15.500	Q
5	Donna-Donny Truyens	Belgium	6.500	8.916		15.416	Q
6	Sašo Bertoncelj	Slovenia	6.300	9.100		15.400	Q
7	Harutyun Merdinyan	Armenia	6.400	8.933		15.333	Q
8	Louis Smith	Great Britain	6.900	8.400		15.300	Q
9	Robert Seligman	Croatia	6.300	8.900		15.200	R
10	Tatsuki Nakashima	Japan	6.100	9.066		15.166	R
11	Alberto Busnari	Italy	6.500	8.666		15.166	R

== Rings ==
Rank	Gymnast	Nation	D Score	E Score	Pen.	Total	Qual.
1	Chen Yibing	China	6.800	9.166		15.966	Q
2	Yan Mingyong	China	6.800	8.900		15.700	Q
3	Koji Yamamuro	Japan	6.700	8.933		15.633	Q
4	Matteo Morandi	Italy	6.700	8.800		15.500	Q
5	Yoo Won-chul	South Korea	6.600	8.866		15.466	Q
6	Chen Chih-yu	Chinese Taipei	6.700	8.766		15.466	Q
7	Kenya Kobayashi	Japan	6.400	9.033		15.433	Q
8	Kōhei Uchimura	Japan	6.400	9.000		15.400	-
9	Ivan San Miguel	Spain	6.500	8.900		15.400	Q
10	Brandon Wynn	United States	6.700	8.700		15.400	R
11	Matteo Angioletti	Italy	6.400	8.966		15.366	R
12	Thomas Taranu	Germany	6.600	8.666		15.266	R

== Vault ==
Rank	Gymnast	Nation	D Score	E Score	Pen.	Score 1	D Score	E Score	Pen.	Score 2	Total	Qual.
Rank	Gymnast	Nation	Vault 1				Vault 2				Total	Qual.
1	Anton Golotsutskov	Russia	7.000	9.550		16.550	7.000	9.400		16.400	16.475	Q
2	Dzmitry Kaspiarovich	Belarus	7.000	9.333		16.333	7.000	9.533		16.533	16.433	Q
3	Thomas Bouhail	France	7.000	9.366		16.366	7.000	9.366		16.366	16.366	Q
4	Yang Hak-seon	South Korea	7.000	9.433		16.433	7.000	9.100		16.100	16.266	Q
5	Flavius Koczi	Romania	7.000	9.166		16.166	7.000	9.366		16.366	16.266	Q
6	Andriy Isayev	Ukraine	6.600	9.433		16.033	7.000	9.433		16.433	16.233	Q
7	Jeffrey Wammes	Netherlands	6.800	9.600		16.400	6.600	9.533	0.1	16.033	16.216	Q
8	Luis Rivera	Puerto Rico	6.600	9.633		16.233	6.600	9.533	0.1	16.033	16.133	Q
9	Koji Yamamuro	Japan	7.000	9.300		16.300	6.600	9.433	0.1	15.933	16.116	R
10	Oleksandr Yakubovs'kyi	Ukraine	7.000	9.233	0.1	16.133	7.000	9.133	0.1	16.033	16.083	R
11	Tomi Tuuha	Finland	6.600	9.666		16.266	6.600	9.266	0.1	15.766	16.016	R

== Parallel bars ==
Rank	Gymnast	Nation	D Score	E Score	Pen.	Total	Qual.
1	Feng Zhe	China	6.800	9.066		15.866	Q
2	Teng Haibin	China	6.400	9.233		15.633	Q
3	Zhang Chenglong	China	6.300	9.166		15.466	-
4	Fabian Hambüchen	Germany	6.300	9.133		15.433	Q
5	Koji Uematsu	Japan	6.500	8.900		15.400	Q
6	Adam Kierzkowski	Poland	6.000	9.366		15.366	Q
7	Kōhei Uchimura	Japan	6.500	8.866		15.366	Q
8	Samuel Piasecký	Slovakia	6.500	8.866		15.366	Q
9	Ildar Valeiev	Kazakhstan	6.900	8.466		15.366	Q
10	Lü Bo	China	6.300	9.041		15.341	-
11	Epke Zonderland	Netherlands	6.000	9.333		15.333	R
12	Philipp Boy	Germany	6.100	9.158		15.258	R
13	Claudio Capelli	Switzerland	6.100	9.141		15.241	R

== Horizontal bar ==
Rank	Gymnast	Nation	D Score	E Score	Pen.	Total	Qual.
1	Zhang Chenglong	China	7.300	8.466		15.766	Q
2	Koji Uematsu	Japan	7.400	8.333		15.733	Q
3	Fabian Hambüchen	Germany	6.800	8.900		15.700	Q
4	Danell Leyva	United States	7.000	8.633		15.633	Q
5	Philipp Boy	Germany	7.000	8.566		15.566	Q
6	Christopher Brooks	United States	6.600	8.900		15.500	Q
7	Epke Zonderland	Netherlands	6.800	8.525		15.325	Q
8	Jonathan Horton	United States	6.600	8.666		15.266	-
9	Feng Zhe	China	6.900	8.366		15.266	Q
10	Marijo Možnik	Croatia	6.600	8.633		15.233	R
11	Jeffrey Wammes	Netherlands	6.700	8.466		15.166	R
12	Kim Ji-hoon	South Korea	6.900	8.266		15.166	R
