= Gymnastics at the 2012 Summer Olympics – Men's artistic qualification =

Competition at the 2012 Summer Olympics

Qualifications for Men's artistic gymnastic competitions at the 2012 Summer Olympics were held at the North Greenwich Arena on July 28. The results of the qualification determined the qualifiers to the finals: 8 teams in the team final, 24 gymnasts in the all-around final, and 8 gymnasts in each of 6 apparatus finals. The competition was divided to 3 subdivisions. The first subdivision took place at 11:00 British Summer Time (UTC+1); the second and third subdivision at 15:30 BST and 20:00 BST respectively.

== Subdivisions ==
Gymnasts from nations taking part in the team all-round event were grouped together while the other gymnasts were grouped into one of six mixed groups. The groups were divided into the three subdivisions after a draw held by the Fédération Internationale de Gymnastique. The groups rotated through each of the six apparatuses together.

=== Subdivision 1 ===
- China
- France
- Great Britain
- South Korea
- Mixed Group 3
  - Artur Davtyan (ARM)
  - Federico Molinari (ARG)
  - Dmitrijs Trefilovs (LAT)
  - Kieran Behan (IRL)
  - Mohamed El Saharty (EGY)
  - Samuel Piasecký (SVK)
- Mixed Group 4
  - Tommy Ramos (PUR)
  - Filip Ude (CRO)
  - Epke Zonderland (NED)
  - Shakir Shikhaliyev (AZE)
  - Claudio Capelli (SUI)
  - Martin Konečný (CZE)

=== Subdivision 2 ===
- United States
- Japan
- Italy
- Mixed Group 1
  - Alexander Shatilov (ISR)
  - Felix Aronovich (ISR)
  - Krisztián Berki (HUN)
  - Vid Hidvégi (HUN)
  - Vasileios Tsolakidis (GRE)
  - Vlasios Maras (GRE)
  - Joshua Jefferis (AUS)
- Mixed Group 5
  - Diego Hypólito (BRA)
  - Arthur Nabarrete Zanetti (BRA)
  - Sérgio Sasaki (BRA)
  - Wai Hung Shek (HKG)
  - Fabian Leimlehner (AUT)
  - Tomás González (CHI)
  - Rokas Guščinas (LTU)
- Mixed Group 6
  - Roman Kulesza (POL)
  - Daniel Corral Barron (MEX)
  - Jimmy Verbaeys (BEL)
  - Jorge Hugo Giraldo (COL)
  - Nathan Gafuik (CAN)
  - Syque Caesar (BAN)

=== Subdivision 3 ===
- Germany
- Romania
- Russia
- Spain
- Ukraine
- Mixed Group 2
  - Stepan Gorbachev (KAZ)
  - Manuel Campos (POR)
  - Yordan Yovchev (BUL)
  - Dzmitry Kaspiarovich (BLR)
  - Phạm Phước Hưng (VIE)
  - Wajdi Bouallègue (TUN)

== Qualification results ==
Team/Gymnast	Nation	Floor (gymnastics)		Pommel horse		Rings (gymnastics)		Vault (gymnastics)		Parallel bars		Horizontal bar		Total (All-around)	
Team/Gymnast	Nation	Score	Rank	Score	Rank	Score	Rank	Score	Rank	Score	Rank	Score	Rank	Score	Rank
United States		46.165	1	43.965	3	45.332	3	48.000	4	45.182	5	46.698	1	275.342	1
Jacob Dalton	United States	15.633	4	—	—	15.100	12	15.900; 15.333	14	—	—	—	—	46.633	
Jonathan Horton	United States	—	—	12.700	56	15.166	10	—	—	13.133	68	15.566	5	56.565	
Danell Leyva	United States	15.100	18	14.866	10	14.600	31	15.500	—	15.333	12	15.866	3	91.265	1
Samuel Mikulak	United States	15.366	12	14.333	20	—	—	16.300; 16.083	4	15.316	13	14.033	43	74.348	
John Orozco	United States	15.166	16	14.766	12	15.066	14	15.800	—	14.533	41	15.266	10	90.597	4
Russia		45.066	6	43.466	4	45.799	1	48.166	3	45.666	3	44.432	5	272.595	2
Denis Ablyazin	Russia	15.433	8	—	—	15.500	5	16.300; 16.366	1	0.000	71	13.733	49	60.966	
Aleksandr Balandin	Russia	—	—	13.733	38	15.666	3	—	—	14.766	26	—	—	44.165	
David Belyavskiy	Russia	15.100	18	14.900	7	14.366	43	16.300	—	15.300	14	14.866	19	90.832	2
Emin Garibov	Russia	14.533	34	14.233	23	14.633	30	15.233	—	15.600	4	15.566	6	89.798	8
Igor Pakhomenko	Russia	14.066	48	14.333	19	—	—	15.566	—	—	—	14.000	44	57.965	
Great Britain		45.832	2	44.833	1	44.199	8	48.333	2	44.024	8	45.199	4	272.420	3
Sam Oldham	Great Britain	14.700	28	—	—	14.600	31	15.533	—	14.666	35	15.100	11	74.599	
Daniel Purvis	Great Britain	15.200	15	13.400	45	15.033	16	16.100	—	14.733	30	14.733	23	89.199	10
Louis Smith	Great Britain	—	—	15.800	1	—	—		—	—	—	13.033	64	28.833	
Kristian Thomas	Great Britain	15.366	11	14.133	25	14.566	35	16.200; 15.983	5	14.625	37	15.366	9	90.256	5
Max Whitlock	Great Britain	15.266	14	14.900	8	14.133	49	16.033	—	13.900	54	—	—	74.232	
Germany		45.332	5	43.266	5	44.766	7	46.533	11	45.758	2	45.233	3	270.888	4
Philipp Boy	Germany	14.766	26	14.333	21	14.166	47	15.700	—	14.933	23	13.800	47	87.698	17
Fabian Hambüchen	Germany	15.133	17	14.100	28	14.766	28	15.833	—	15.300	15	15.633	4	90.765	3
Sebastian Krimmer	Germany	—	—	14.833	11	—	—		—	14.633	36	14.600	26	44.066	
Marcel Nguyen	Germany	15.433	7	13.900	33	15.100	13	14.875	—	15.525	6	15.000	15	89.833	7
Andreas Toba	Germany	13.133	65	—	—	14.900	21	15.000	—	—	—	—	—	43.033	
Japan		45.632	3	41.199	9	45.099	6	47.683	7	47.124	1	43.766	8	270.503	5
Ryohei Kato	Japan	15.433	9	14.333	21	—	—	15.900	—	—	—	—	—	45.666	
Kazuhito Tanaka	Japan	13.666	61	12.200	62	15.100	11	15.750	—	15.725	2	14.400	30	86.841	22
Yusuke Tanaka	Japan	—	—	—	—	15.033	17	—	—	15.866	1	14.200	36	45.099	
Kōhei Uchimura	Japan	15.766	2	12.466	60	14.966	19	16.033	—	15.533	5	15.000	16	89.764	9
Koji Yamamuro	Japan	14.433	41	14.400	15	14.900	23	15.333; 14.266	17	14.200	50	14.366	32	87.632	18
China		44.932	7	40.865	10	45.124	5	47.633	8	44.965	6	46.466	2	269.985	6
Chen Yibing	China	—	—	14.466	14	15.858	1	—	—	12.900	69	—	—	43.224	
Feng Zhe	China	14.433	40	—	—	14.866	24	16.100	—	15.633	3	15.000	14	76.032	
Guo Weiyang	China	12.266	70	13.266	47	14.400	42	15.300	—	13.966	53	14.933	18	84.131	29
Zhang Chenglong	China	14.666	31	13.133	48	—	—	16.233	—	15.366	9	15.933	2	75.331	
Zou Kai	China	15.833	1	12.533	58	—	—	15.200	—	—	—	15.533	7	59.099	
Ukraine		44.599	9	44.233	2	45.166	4	48.515	1	43.765	9	43.532	9	269.810	7
Mykola Kuksenkov	Ukraine	14.533	34	14.900	9	15.000	18	15.766	—	15.066	22	14.666	25	89.931	6
Vitalii Nakonechnyi	Ukraine	14.066	47	14.933	6	—	—	—	—	14.133	51	14.800	21	57.932	
Igor Radivilov	Ukraine	—	—	—	—	15.300	9	16.266; 15.799	8	—	—	—	—	31.566	
Oleg Stepko	Ukraine	15.033	20	14.400	16	14.866	26	15.916	—	13.366	66	13.466	59	87.047	20
Oleg Verniaiev	Ukraine	15.033	21	14.366	18	14.600	34	16.333; 15.549	11	14.566	40	14.066	41	88.964	13
France		44.333	10	42.932	6	43.165	10	45.765	12	45.366	4	44.198	6	265.759	8
Pierre-Yves Bény	France	14.433	39	13.566	41	14.266	45	14.933	—	14.700	32	—	—	71.898	
Yann Cucherat	France	—	—	—	—	—	—	—	—	14.900	24	14.366	31	29.266	
Gaël Da Silva	France	15.400	10	—	—	14.366	44	15.366	—	—	—	14.966	17	60.098	
Hamilton Sabot	France	—	—	14.033	30	14.533	36	—	—	15.366	9	14.866	20	58.798	
Cyril Tommasone	France	14.500	37	15.333	2	14.166	46	15.466	—	15.100	20	14.133	37	88.698	14
Spain		44.699	8	42.566	7	42.899	11	47.958	5	43.632	10	43.833	7	265.587	9
Isaac Botella Pérez	Spain	14.033	52	12.900	51	—	—	15.866; 15.833	7	—	—	—	—	42.799	
Javier Gómez Fuertes	Spain	14.833	23	13.833	35	13.900	58	15.958	—	15.066	21	14.533	27	88.123	16
Fabián González	Spain	15.266	13	14.733	13	14.033	53	16.000	—	13.333	67	15.000	13	88.365	15
Rubén López	Spain	—	—	—	—	14.900	22	—	—	14.733	29	14.300	34	43.933	
Sergio Muñoz	Spain	14.600	32	14.000	31	13.966	56	16.000	—	13.833	55	13.266	61	85.665	26
Romania		45.348	4	39.899	11	43.899	9	47.332	9	44.832	7	41.257	11	262.567	10
Cristian Bățagă	Romania	14.666	29	12.700	55	14.833	27	15.766	—	—	—	—	—	57.965	
Marius Berbecar	Romania	—	—	12.733	54	14.466	38	15.433	—	15.233	16	13.700	51	71.565	
Ovidiu Budoso	Romania	14.366	42	13.766	36	—	—	—	—	14.733	28	14.066	40	56.931	
Vlad Cotuna	Romania	15.016	22	—	—	14.400	41	15.500	—	14.866	25	13.491	58	73.273	
Flavius Koczi	Romania	15.666	3	13.400	46	14.600	33	16.066; 15.949	6	13.500	62	12.633	66	85.865	25
Italy		43.165	11	42.391	8	45.698	2	46.799	10	43.366	11	40.666	12	262.085	11
Matteo Angioletti	Italy	14.033	50	—	—	15.066	15	15.566; 15.583	10	—	—	—	—	44.665	
Alberto Busnari	Italy	—	—	15.058	4	—	—	—	—	13.766	56	12.100	67	40.924	
Matteo Morandi	Italy	14.133	46	0.000	69	15.766	2	15.633	—	14.500	43	0.000	70	60.032	41
Paolo Ottavi	Italy	14.266	43	13.700	39	14.866	24	14.933	—	14.500	44	14.066	39	86.331	24
Enrico Pozzo	Italy	14.766	24	13.633	40	14.033	53	15.600	—	14.366	46	14.500	29	86.698	21
South Korea		41.765	12	38.666	12	41.932	12	47.865	6	42.433	12	42.666	10	255.327	12
Kim Hee-Hoon	South Korea	12.933	67	12.100	66	14.166	48	15.966	—	13.700	58	—	—	68.865	
Kim Ji-Hoon	South Korea	12.900	69	13.100	49	—	—	—	—	—	—	15.500	8	41.500	
Kim Seung-Il	South Korea	—	—	12.133	64	12.666	68	14.533	—	14.033	52	13.233	62	66.598	
Kim Soo-Myun	South Korea	14.766	27	13.433	43	13.833	59	15.666; 14.412	16	14.700	33	13.933	45	86.331	23
Yang Hak-Seon	South Korea	14.066	49	—	—	13.933	57	16.233; 16.333	2	11.966	70	11.233	68	67.431	
Sergio Sasaki	Brazil	14.533	36	14.033	29	14.633	29	16.200	—	15.200	17	14.533	28	89.132	11
Alexander Shatilov	Israel	15.633	4	14.133	27	14.033	55	15.533	—	14.700	31	15.000	12	89.032	12
Claudio Capelli	Switzerland	14.766	25	14.133	26	14.133	49	15.200	—	14.600	38	14.766	22	87.598	19
Joshua Jefferis	Australia	13.800	58	13.433	42	14.533	37	15.500	—	14.566	39	13.766	48	85.598	27
Roman Kulesza	Poland	13.933	54	12.966	50	13.466	63	14.900	—	14.700	34	14.733	24	84.698	28
Stepan Gorbachev	Kazakhstan	13.900	55	13.733	37	13.533	62	15.666	—	13.433	63	13.666	53	83.931	30
Jimmy Verbaeys	Belgium	14.500	38	10.866	67	14.066	52	15.266	—	14.533	42	14.333	33	83.564	31
Felix Aronovich	Israel	14.033	51	13.433	44	14.100	51	13.900	—	14.233	48	13.500	56	83.199	32
Jorge Giraldo	Colombia	13.400	64	12.166	63	14.933	20	15.466	—	13.633	60	13.500	57	83.098	33
Martin Konečný	Czech Republic	14.266	44	12.900	51	13.166	66	14.866	—	13.733	57	14.100	38	83.031	34
Manuel Campos	Portugal	14.166	45	12.500	59	14.433	39	14.200	—	14.400	45	13.200	63	82.899	35
Artur Davtyan	Armenia	13.800	57	13.900	33	13.400	64	14.166; 14.833	15	14.233	47	13.366	60	82.865	36
Mohamed El-Saharty	Egypt	13.900	55	12.600	57	13.566	61	15.466; 15.483	12	13.400	65	13.666	52	82.598	37
Dmitrijs Trefilovs	Latvia	12.900	68	14.233	24	13.133	67	14.733	—	13.533	61	14.033	43	82.565	38
Fabian Leimlehner	Austria	12.966	66	12.100	65	13.633	60	14.966	—	14.200	49	13.533	54	81.398	39
Shakir Shikhaliyev	Azerbaijan	14.600	33	12.866	53	13.166	65	15.433	—	13.666	59	10.633	69	80.364	40
Syque Caesar	Bangladesh	14.666	29	—	—	—	—	15.116	—	14.766	27	13.700	50	58.248	
Shek Wai Hung	Hong Kong	13.408	63	10.833	68	—	—	16.033; 15.466	13	—	—	13.533	55	52.674	
Tomás González	Chile	15.533	6	—	—	—	—	16.433; 16.149	3	—	—	—	—	31.966	
Epke Zonderland	Netherlands	—	—	—	—	—	—	—	—	15.133	18	15.966	1	31.099	
Phạm Phước Hưng	Vietnam	—	—	—	—	14.433	39	—	—	15.133	19	—	—	29.566	
Federico Molinari	Argentina	13.433	62	—	—	15.333	7		—	—	—	—	—	28.766	
Samuel Piasecký	Slovakia	—	—	—	—	—	—	—	—	15.358	11	12.666	65	28.024	
Kieran Behan	Ireland	13.966	53	—	—	—	—	13.933	—	—	—	—	—	27.899	
Daniel Corral	Mexico	—	—	12.333	61	—	—	—	—	15.433	8	—	—	27.766	
Vlasios Maras	Greece	—	—	—	—	—	—	—	—	13.400	64	14.300	35	27.700	
Dzmitry Kaspiarovich	Belarus	—	—	—	—	—	—	16.333; 15.666	9	—	—	—	—	16.333	
Arthur Zanetti	Brazil	—	—	—	—	15.616	4	—	—	—	—	—	—	15.616	
Tommy Ramos	Puerto Rico	—	—	—	—	15.500	5	—	—	—	—	—	—	15.500	
Vasileios Tsolakidis	Greece	—	—	—	—	—	—	—	—	15.466	7	—	—	15.466	
Yordan Yovchev	Bulgaria	—	—	—	—	15.308	8	—	—	—	—	—	—	15.308	
Vid Hidvégi	Hungary	—	—	15.100	3	—	—	—	—	—	—	—	—	15.100	
Krisztián Berki	Hungary	—	—	15.033	5	—	—	—	—	—	—	—	—	15.033	
Rokas Guščinas	Lithuania	—	—	14.366	17	—	—	—	—	—	—	—	—	14.366	
Filip Ude	Croatia	—	—	13.933	32	—	—	—	—	—	—	—	—	13.933	
Nathan Gafuik	Canada	—	—	—	—	—	—	—	—	—	—	13.866	46	13.866	
Diego Hypólito	Brazil	13.766	59	—	—	—	—	—	—	—	—	—	—	13.766	
Wajdi Bouallègue	Tunisia	13.708	60	—	—	—	—	—	—	—	—	—	—	13.708	

=== Individual All-Around Event Qualifiers ===
Position	Gymnast	Nation	Floor (gymnastics)	Pommel horse	Rings (gymnastics)	Vault (gymnastics)	Parallel bars	Horizontal bar	Total
1st	Danell Leyva	United States	15.100	14.866	14.600	15.500	15.333	15.666	91.265
2nd	David Belyavskiy	Russia	15.100	14.900	14.366	16.300	15.300	14.866	90.832
3rd	Fabian Hambüchen	Germany	15.133	14.100	14.766	15.833	15.300	15.633	90.765
4th	John Orozco	United States	15.166	14.766	15.066	15.800	14.533	15.266	90.597
5th	Kristian Thomas	Great Britain	15.366	14.133	14.566	16.200	15.625	15.366	90.256
6th	Mykola Kuksenkov	Ukraine	14.533	14.900	15.000	15.766	15.066	14.666	89.931
7th	Marcel Nguyen	Germany	14.433	13.900	15.100	14.875	15.535	15.000	89.833
8th	Emin Garibov	Russia	14.533	14.233	14.633	15.233	15.600	15.566	89.798
9th	Kōhei Uchimura	Japan	15.766	12.466	14.966	16.033	15.533	15.000	89.764
10th	Daniel Purvis	Great Britain	15.200	13.400	15.033	16.100	14.733	14.733	89.199
11th	Sergio Sasaki	Brazil	14.533	14.033	14.633	16.200	15.200	14.533	89.132
12th	Alexander Shatilov	Israel	15.633	14.133	14.033	15.533	14.700	15.000	89.032
13th	Oleg Verniaiev	Ukraine	15.033	14.366	14.600	16.333	14.566	14.066	88.964
14th	Cyril Tommasone	France	14.500	15.333	14.166	15.466	15.100	14.133	88.698
15th	Fabián González	Spain	15.266	14.733	14.033	16.000	13.333	15.000	88.365
16th	Javier Gómez Fuertes	Spain	14.833	13.833	13.900	15.958	15.066	14.544	88.123
18th	Koji Yamamuro	Japan	14.433	14.400	14.900	15.333	14.200	14.366	87.632
19th	Claudio Capelli	Switzerland	14.766	14.133	14.133	15.200	14.600	14.766	87.598
21st	Enrico Pozzo	Italy	14.766	13.633	14.033	15.600	14.366	14.500	86.898
23rd	Kim Soo-Myun	South Korea	14.766	13.433	13.833	15.666	14.700	13.933	86.331
24th	Paolo Ottavi	Italy	14.266	13.700	14.866	14.933	14.500	14.066	86.331
25th	Flavius Koczi	Romania	15.666	13.400	14.600	16.066	13.500	12.633	85.865
27th	Joshua Jefferis	Australia	13.800	13.433	14.533	15.500	14.566	13.766	85.598
28th	Roman Kulesza	Poland	13.933	12.966	13.466	14.900	14.700	14.733	84.698

==== Reserves ====
The reserves for the individual all-around event final were

- Guo Weiyang (CHN)
- Stephen Gorbachev (KAZ)
- Jimmy Verbaeys (BEL)
- Felix Aronovich (ISR)

Only two gymnasts from each country may advance to the All Around Final. Therefore, in some cases, a third gymnast placed high enough to qualify, but did not advance to the final because of the quota. Gymnasts who did not advance to the Final, but had high enough scores to do so were:

- Philipp Boy (GER) (17th place)
- Oleg Stepko (UKR) (20th place)
- Kazuhito Tanaka (JPN) (22nd place) (ended up replacing Yamamuro, who was injured after the Team Final)
- Sergio Muñoz (ESP) (26th place)

=== Floor event qualifiers ===
Rank	Gymnast	Nation	D Score	E Score	Pen.	Total	Qual.
1	Zou Kai	China	6.900	8.933		15.833	Q
2	Kōhei Uchimura	Japan	6.700	9.066		15.766	Q
3	Flavius Koczi	Romania	6.700	8.966		15.666	Q
4	Jacob Dalton	United States	6.600	9.033		15.633	Q
4	Alexander Shatilov	Israel	6.600	9.033		15.633	Q
6	Tomás González	Chile	6.500	9.033		15.533	Q
7	Marcel Nguyen	Germany	6.500	8.933		15.433	Q
8	Denis Ablyazin	Russia	6.900	8.833	0.3	15.433	Q

==== Reserves ====
The reserves for the floor event final were

- Ryohei Kato (JPN)
- Gaël Da Silva (FRA)
- Alex Watters (CAN)

=== Men's Pommel Horse Qualifiers ===
Rank	Gymnast	Nation	D Score	E Score	Pen.	Total	Qual.
1	Louis Smith	Great Britain	6.900	8.900		15.800	Q
2	Cyril Tommasone	France	6.500	8.833		15.333	Q
3	Vid Hidvégi	Hungary	6.300	8.800		15.100	Q
4	Alberto Busnari	Italy	6.600	8.458		15.058	Q
5	Krisztián Berki	Hungary	6.400	8.633		15.033	Q
6	Vitalii Nakonechnyi	Ukraine	6.300	8.633		14.933	Q
7	David Belyavskiy	Russia	6.300	8.600		14.900	Q
8	Max Whitlock	Great Britain	6.400	8.500		14.900	Q

==== Reserves ====
The reserves for the pommel horse event final were

- Mykola Kuksenkov (UKR)
- Danell Leyva (USA)
- Sebastian Krimmer (GER)

=== Men's Still Rings qualifiers ===
Rank	Gymnast	Nation	D Score	E Score	Pen.	Total	Qual.
1	Chen Yibing	China	6.800	9.058		15.858	Q
2	Matteo Morandi	Italy	6.800	8.966		15.766	Q
3	Aleksandr Balandin	Russia	6.700	8.966		15.666	Q
4	Arthur Zanetti	Brazil	6.500	9.116		15.616	Q
5	Denis Ablyazin	Russia	6.600	8.900		15.500	Q
6	Tommy Ramos	Puerto Rico	6.800	8.700		15.500	Q
7	Federico Molinari	Argentina	6.700	8.633		15.333	Q
8	Yordan Yovchev	Bulgaria	6.600	8.708		15.308	Q

At 39 years old, Yordan Yovchev was the oldest of all the competitors in the artistic gymnastics events at the 2012 Summer Olympics. He and Oksana Chusovitina share the record for competing at the greatest number of Olympic Games – for both artistic gymnasts, the 2012 Summer Olympics in London was their 6th time as Olympians.

==== Reserves ====
The reserves for the still rings event final were:

- Igor Radivilov (UKR)
- Jonathan Horton (USA)
- Kazuhito Tanaka (JPN)

=== Vault qualifiers ===
Rank	Gymnast	Nation	Vault 1				Vault 2				Total
Rank	Gymnast	Nation	A Score	B Score	Pen.	Vault Score	A Score	B Score	Pen.	Vault Score	Total
1	Denis Ablyazin	Russia	7.000	9.300		16.300	7.200	9.233		16.433	16.366
2	Yang Hak Seon	South Korea	7.000	9.233		16.233	7.000	9.433		16.433	16.333
3	Tomas González Sepúlveda	Chile	7.000	9.433		16.433	6.600	9.366	0.10	15.866	16.149
4	Samuel Mikulak	United States	7.000	9.300		16.300	6.600	9.266		15.866	16.083
5	Kristian Thomas	Great Britain	7.000	9.300	0.10	16.200	6.600	9.166		15.766	15.983
6	Flavius Koczi	Romania	7.000	9.166	0.10	16.066	7.000	8.933	0.10	15.833	15.949
7	Isaac Botella Pérez	Spain	6.600	9.266		15.866	6.600	9.200		15.800	15.833
8	Igor Radivilov	Ukraine	7.000	9.266		16.266	7.000	8.633	0.30	15.333	15.799

==== Reserves ====
The reserves for the vault event final were

- Dzmitry Kaspiarovich (BLR)
- Matteo Angioletti (ITA)
- Oleg Verniaiev (UKR)

=== Parallel Bars qualifiers ===
Rank	Gymnast	Nation	D Score	E Score	Pen.	Total	Qual.
1	Yusuke Tanaka	Japan	6.400	9.466		15.866	Q
2	Kazuhito Tanaka	Japan	6.700	9.025		15.725	Q
3	Feng Zhe	China	7.000	8.633		15.633	Q
4	Emin Garibov	Russia	6.500	9.100		15.600	Q
5	Marcel Nguyen	Germany	6.400	8.633		15.033	Q
6	Vasileios Tsolakidis	Greece	6.500	8.966		15.466	Q
7	Daniel Corral	Mexico	6.600	8.833		15.433	Q
8	Hamilton Sabot	France	6.500	8.866		15.366	Q
8	Zhang Chenglong	China	6.500	8.866		15.366	Q

==== Reserves ====
The reserves for the parallel bars event final were

- Samuel Piasecký (SVK)
- Danell Leyva (USA)

=== Horizontal Bar qualifiers ===
Rank	Gymnast	Nation	D Score	E Score	Pen.	Total	Qual.
1	Epke Zonderland	Netherlands	7.500	8.466		15.966	Q
2	Zhang Chenglong	China	7.500	8.433		15.933	Q
3	Danell Leyva	United States	7.200	8.666		15.866	Q
4	Fabian Hambüchen	Germany	7.000	8.633		15.633	Q
5	Jonathan Horton	United States	6.800	8.766		15.566	Q
6	Emin Garibov	Russia	7.300	8.266		15.566	Q
7	Zou Kai	China	7.400	8.133		15.533	Q
8	Kim Ji-Hoon	South Korea	7.300	8.200		15.500	Q

==== Reserves ====
The reserves for the horizontal bars event final were

- Kristian Thomas (GBR)
- Sam Oldham (GBR)
- Alexander Shatilov (ISR)
