= Gymnastics at the 2012 Summer Olympics – Men's artistic individual all-around =

Men's artistic individual all-around at the Games of the XXX Olympiad
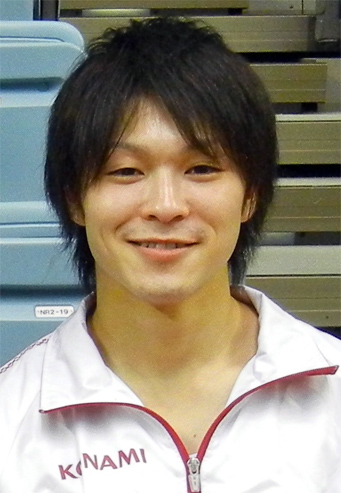
- Gold medalist Kōhei Uchimura (2011)
- Venue: North Greenwich Arena 1
- Dates: 28 July – 1 August
- Competitors: 41 from 27 nations

Medalists
1st place, gold medalist(s)		Kōhei Uchimura	Japan
2nd place, silver medalist(s)		Marcel Nguyen	Germany
3rd place, bronze medalist(s)		Danell Leyva	United States

The men's artistic gymnastics individual all-around competition at the 2012 Summer Olympics was held at the North Greenwich Arena on 28 July and 1 August 2012. It included 41 competitors from 27 nations.

Kōhei Uchimura of Japan won the gold medal, his nation's first victory in the men's all-around since 1984 and its fifth overall. (At that point, Japan was second to the Soviet Union, whose gymnasts won the event six times; Uchimura would win again in 2016, bringing the two nations even.) Uchimura was the 14th man to earn multiple all-around medals, adding to his silver from 2008.

Germany's Marcel Nguyen earned silver, the first men's all-around medal for a German gymnast (including the United Team of Germany, East Germany, and West Germany) since the 1936 Games in Berlin. Danell Leyva of the United States took bronze.

== Background ==
This was the 26th appearance of the men's individual all-around in the Olympics. The event was first held in 1900 and has been included in every Games since then.

Two of the top 10 gymnasts from the 2008 Games returned in 2012: Uchimura and seventh-place finisher Fabian Hambüchen of Germany. Uchimura had won the past three World Championships and was the favorite coming into the Games.

Azerbaijan made its debut in the event. France made its 24th appearance, the most of any nation.

== Qualification process ==
Qualification for the 2012 Olympics was based primarily on the 2011 World Artistic Gymnastics Championships. The top 8 teams at the world championships could send a full team of 5 gymnasts to the Olympics. The teams ranked 9th through 16th competed in the 2012 Gymnastics Olympic Test Event, where the top 4 finishers also qualified full teams for the Olympics.

The individual apparatus medalists from the World Championships also qualified, if their nation had not already qualified a team. The FIG Executive Board made invitational selections to ensure host country and continental representation, and the Tripartite Commission made an invitation. The remainder of the quota of 98 gymnasts was filled through the individual all-around rankings at the Test Event, with only one gymnast per nation able to qualify in that manner.

At the Games, the top 24 competitors in the qualification phase (with a limit of two per country), based on combined scores on all six apparatuses, advanced to the individual all-around final. The finalists performed on each apparatus again. Qualification scores were then ignored, with only final-round scores counting.

== Results ==
=== Qualifying ===
Rank	Gymnast	Nation	Floor (gymnastics)	Pommel horse	Rings (gymnastics)	Vault (gymnastics)	Parallel bars	Horizontal bar	Total	Notes
1	Danell Leyva	United States	15.100	14.866	14.600	15.500	15.333	15.666	91.265	Q
2	David Belyavskiy	Russia	15.100	14.900	14.366	16.300	15.300	14.866	90.832	Q
3	Fabian Hambüchen	Germany	15.133	14.100	14.766	15.833	15.300	15.633	90.765	Q
4	John Orozco	United States	15.166	14.766	15.066	15.800	14.533	15.266	90.597	Q
5	Kristian Thomas	Great Britain	15.366	14.133	14.566	16.200	15.625	15.366	90.256	Q
6	Nikolai Kuksenkov	Ukraine	14.533	14.900	15.000	15.766	15.066	14.666	89.931	Q
7	Marcel Nguyen	Germany	14.433	13.900	15.100	14.875	15.535	15.000	89.833	Q
8	Emin Garibov	Russia	14.533	14.233	14.633	15.233	15.600	15.566	89.798	Q
9	Kōhei Uchimura	Japan	15.766	12.466	14.966	16.033	15.533	15.000	89.764	Q
10	Daniel Purvis	Great Britain	15.200	13.400	15.033	16.100	14.733	14.733	89.199	Q
11	Sérgio Sasaki	Brazil	14.533	14.033	14.633	16.200	15.200	14.533	89.132	Q
12	Alexander Shatilov	Israel	15.633	14.133	14.033	15.533	14.700	15.000	89.032	Q
13	Oleg Verniaiev	Ukraine	15.033	14.366	14.600	16.333	14.566	14.066	88.964	Q
14	Cyril Tommasone	France	14.500	15.333	14.166	15.466	15.100	14.133	88.698	Q
15	Fabián González	Spain	15.266	14.733	14.033	16.000	13.333	15.000	88.365	Q
16	Javier Gómez Fuertes	Spain	14.833	13.833	13.900	15.958	15.066	14.544	88.123	Q
17	Philipp Boy	Germany	14.766	14.333	14.166	15.700	14.933	13.800	87.698	2 per NOC
18	Koji Yamamuro	Japan	14.433	14.400	14.900	15.333	14.200	14.366	87.632	Q, withdrew
19	Claudio Capelli	Switzerland	14.766	14.133	14.133	15.200	14.600	14.766	87.598	Q
20	Oleg Stepko	Ukraine	15.033	14.400	14.866	15.916	13.366	13.466	87.047	2 per NOC
21	Enrico Pozzo	Italy	14.766	13.633	14.033	15.600	14.366	14.500	86.898	Q
22	Kazuhito Tanaka	Japan	13.666	12.200	15.100	15.750	15.725	14.400	86.841	Q
23	Kim Soo-myun	South Korea	14.766	13.433	13.833	15.666	14.700	13.933	86.331	Q
24	Paolo Ottavi	Italy	14.266	13.700	14.866	14.933	14.500	14.066	86.331	Q
25	Flavius Koczi	Romania	15.666	13.400	14.600	16.066	13.500	12.633	85.865	Q
26	Sergio Muñoz	Spain	14.600	14.000	13.966	16.000	13.833	13.266	85.665	2 per NOC
27	Joshua Jefferis	Australia	13.800	13.433	14.533	15.500	14.566	13.766	85.598	Q
28	Roman Kulesza	Poland	13.933	12.966	13.466	14.900	14.700	14.733	84.698	Q
29	Guo Weiyang	China	12.266	13.266	14.400	15.300	13.966	14.933	84.131	
30	Stepan Gorbachev	Kazakhstan	13.900	13.733	13.533	15.666	13.433	13.666	83.931	
31	Jimmy Verbaeys	Belgium	14.500	10.866	14.066	15.266	14.533	14.333	83.564	
32	Felix Aronovich	Israel	14.033	13.433	14.100	13.900	14.233	13.500	83.199	
33	Jorge Hugo Giraldo	Colombia	13.400	12.166	14.933	15.466	13.633	13.500	83.098	
34	Martin Konečný	Czech Republic	14.266	12.900	13.166	14.866	13.733	14.100	83.031	
35	Manuel Campos	Portugal	14.166	12.500	14.433	14.200	14.400	13.200	82.899	
36	Artur Davtyan	Armenia	13.800	13.900	13.400	14.166	14.233	13.366	82.865	
37	Mohamed El-Saharty	Egypt	13.900	12.600	13.566	15.466	13.400	13.666	82.598	
38	Dmitrijs Trefilovs	Latvia	12.900	14.233	13.133	14.733	13.533	14.033	82.565	
39	Fabian Leimlehner	Austria	12.966	12.100	13.633	14.966	14.200	13.533	81.398	
40	Shakir Shikhaliyev	Azerbaijan	14.600	12.866	13.166	15.433	13.666	10.633	80.364	
41	Matteo Morandi	Italy	14.133	0.000	15.766	15.633	14.500	0.000	60.032	

Only two gymnasts per country were allowed to advance to the all-around final. The following gymnasts finished in the top 24 in the qualifying round but did not advance because of the two-per-country rule:

- Philipp Boy (GER) (17th place)
- Oleg Stepko (UKR) (20th place)
- Sergio Muñoz (ESP) (26th place)

Kazuhito Tanaka (22nd place) was initially excluded by the two-per-country rule as well, but advanced to the final after his teammate Koji Yamamuro was injured on vault during the men's team competition.

=== Final ===
Rank	Gymnast	Nation	Floor (gymnastics)	Pommel horse	Rings (gymnastics)	Vault (gymnastics)	Parallel bars	Horizontal bar	Total
1st place, gold medalist(s)	Kōhei Uchimura	Japan	15.100 (8)	15.066 (2)	15.333 (2)	16.266 (1)	15.325 (7)	15.600 (2)	92.690
2nd place, silver medalist(s)	Marcel Nguyen	Germany	15.300 (5)	13.666 (17)	15.366 (1)	15.666 (9)	15.833 (=1)	15.200 (4)	91.031
3rd place, bronze medalist(s)	Danell Leyva	United States	15.366 (4)	13.500 (19)	14.733 (14)	15.566 (10)	15.833 (=1)	15.700 (1)	90.698
4	Nikolai Kuksenkov	Ukraine	14.633 (11)	14.600 (5)	15.200 (=3)	15.533 (=11)	15.400 (=4)	15.066 (6)	90.432
5	David Belyavskiy	Russia	14.466 (15)	14.866 (3)	14.833 (9)	16.200 (3)	15.166 (10)	14.766 (12)	90.297
6	Kazuhito Tanaka	Japan	14.166 (18)	13.433 (20)	15.200 (=3)	15.533 (=11)	15.500 (3)	15.575 (3)	89.407
7	Kristian Thomas	Great Britain	15.566 (2)	14.566 (6)	14.633 (15)	14.908 (20)	14.733 (=17)	15.000 (7)	89.406
8	John Orozco	United States	15.433 (3)	12.566 (23)	15.200 (=3)	15.900 (8)	15.266 (8)	14.966 (=8)	89.331
9	Fabián González	Spain	14.600 (12)	14.733 (4)	13.966 (23)	16.133 (4)	14.400 (=21)	15.166 (5)	88.998
10	Sérgio Sasaki	Brazil	14.233 (17)	14.366 (=7)	14.233 (17)	16.100 (5)	15.200 (9)	14.833 (=10)	88.965
11	Oleg Verniaiev	Ukraine	14.533 (13)	13.966 (14)	14.866 (=7)	16.233 (2)	15.033 (12)	14.300 (17)	88.931
12	Alexander Shatilov	Israel	15.600 (1)	14.266 (=9)	14.200 (=18)	15.133 (18)	14.400 (=21)	14.833 (=10)	88.432
13	Daniel Purvis	Great Britain	15.166 (7)	14.266 (=9)	14.800 (=10)	16.000 (=6)	13.600 (24)	14.500 (=13)	88.332
14	Emin Garibov	Russia	14.475 (14)	14.233 (11)	14.866 (=7)	14.833 (21)	15.366 (6)	14.233 (18)	88.006
15	Fabian Hambüchen	Germany	15.200 (6)	13.266 (21)	14.800 (=10)	14.766 (22)	15.400 (=4)	14.333 (16)	87.765
16	Cyril Tommasone	France	13.500 (22)	15.333 (1)	14.400 (16)	15.358 (16)	15.000 (13)	14.066 (20)	87.657
17	Claudio Capelli	Switzerland	14.866 (9)	14.366 (=7)	14.166 (20)	14.566 (23)	14.850 (15)	14.500 (=13)	87.314
18	Enrico Pozzo	Italy	14.700 (10)	13.900 (15)	14.000 (=21)	15.466 (=13)	14.533 (20)	14.433 (15)	87.032
19	Joshua Jefferis	Australia	14.066 (19)	13.533 (18)	14.800 (=10)	15.433 (15)	14.900 (14)	14.133 (19)	86.865
20	Kim Soo-myun	South Korea	12.266 (24)	13.700 (16)	14.200 (=18)	16.000 (=6)	14.641 (19)	14.966 (=8)	85.773
21	Jimmy Verbaeys	Belgium	13.933 (20)	14.033 (=12)	14.000 (=21)	15.266 (17)	14.833 (16)	13.166 (23)	85.231
22	Paolo Ottavi	Italy	12.466 (23)	14.033 (=12)	15.016 (6)	15.000 (19)	14.100 (23)	14.033 (21)	84.648
23	Javier Gómez Fuertes	Spain	14.266 (16)	12.433 (24)	14.800 (=10)	15.466 (=13)	14.733 (=17)	12.733 (24)	84.431
24	Roman Kulesza	Poland	13.866 (21)	13.000 (22)	13.866 (24)	14.400 (24)	15.100 (11)	13.933 (22)	84.165

Number in brackets indicates rank in the event.
