= 2011 World Artistic Gymnastics Championships – Men's qualification =

The men's qualification round at the 2011 World Artistic Gymnastics Championships was held on 9 October 2011.

== Individual all-around ==
Rank	Gymnast	Nation	Floor (gymnastics)	Pommel horse	Rings (gymnastics)	Vault (gymnastics)	Parallel bars	Horizontal bar	Total	Qual.
1	Kōhei Uchimura	Japan	15.466	15.433	15.233	15.200	15.391	15.533	92.256	Q
2	John Orozco	United States	14.300	15.000	15.033	15.900	15.033	15.266	90.532	Q
3	Danell Leyva	United States	14.800	14.633	14.483	16.100	15.366	14.466	89.848	Q
4	Koji Yamamuro	Japan	14.533	14.700	15.533	16.400	14.066	14.533	89.765	Q
5	Jonathan Horton	United States	14.900	13.308	15.366	16.083	14.966	15.066	89.689	-
6	Daniel Purvis	Great Britain	15.200	14.566	14.100	15.900	15.133	14.233	89.132	Q
7	Philipp Boy	Germany	14.300	13.366	14.466	16.066	15.233	15.266	88.697	Q
8	Emin Garibov	Russia	14.433	14.466	14.366	15.433	15.033	14.933	88.664	Q
9	Mykola Kuksenkov	Ukraine	14.900	14.400	14.200	15.816	14.666	14.666	88.648	Q
10	Marcel Nguyen	Germany	14.466	13.733	15.033	15.833	15.133	14.266	88.464	Q
11	Rafael Martínez	Spain	14.633	14.333	14.233	16.041	14.566	14.500	88.306	Q
12	Cyril Tommasone	France	14.433	15.300	14.066	15.566	14.633	14.233	88.231	Q
13	Luis Rivera	Puerto Rico	14.300	14.600	14.733	15.766	14.366	14.066	87.831	Q
14	Flavius Koczi	Romania	15.400	14.900	12.733	16.366	14.400	13.933	87.732	Q
15	Anton Fokin	Uzbekistan	14.766	14.400	13.900	15.866	15.166	13.600	87.698	Q
16	David Belyavskiy	Russia	15.033	14.100	14.166	16.133	14.100	14.100	87.632	Q
17	Kim Seung-il	South Korea	14.533	14.433	14.466	15.566	14.466	14.166	87.630	Q
18	Teng Haibin	China	13.933	15.300	14.133	15.600	15.100	13.533	87.599	Q
19	Fabian Hambüchen	Germany	14.675	11.933	14.733	15.566	15.100	15.500	87.507	-
20	Kim Soo-myun	South Korea	14.633	14.800	14.125	15.900	14.341	13.600	87.399	Q
21	Marian Drăgulescu	Romania	15.566	12.500	13.800	16.400	14.433	14.333	87.032	Q
22	Alexander Shatilov	Israel	15.500	13.866	13.400	15.500	14.466	14.000	86.732	Q
23	Tomás González	Chile	15.400	13.233	14.533	15.533	14.366	13.600	86.665	Q
24	Steven Legendre	United States	15.433	13.433	14.066	15.233	14.133	14.300	86.598	-
25	Oleg Stepko	Ukraine	14.600	13.966	14.100	15.833	14.766	13.300	86.565	Q
26	Andrei Likhovitsky	Belarus	14.333	15.000	14.133	15.133	14.608	13.333	86.540	Q
27	Pascal Bucher	Switzerland	13.900	14.100	13.900	15.500	14.800	14.266	86.466	Q
28	Nathan Gafuik	Canada	14.600	13.733	14.125	15.966	14.900	13.133	86.457	R
29	Vitaly Nakonechny	Ukraine	14.333	13.733	14.066	15.600	14.566	14.033	86.331	-
30	Eugen Spiridonov	Germany	14.666	13.900	14.000	15.400	14.516	13.666	86.148	-
31	Javier Gómez Fuertes	Spain	14.100	13.200	14.400	15.800	14.633	13.991	86.124	R
32	Sergio Muñoz	Spain	13.700	14.333	14.466	16.066	13.500	13.800	85.865	-
33	Manuel Almeida Campos	Portugal	14.300	13.833	14.200	14.966	14.200	14.333	85.832	R
34	Fabian Gonzalez	Spain	14.766	13.233	13.766	15.933	14.133	13.833	85.664	-
35	Claudio Capelli	Switzerland	14.400	12.950	13.866	15.533	14.700	13.933	85.382	R

== Floor exercise ==
Rank	Gymnast	Nation	D Score	E Score	Pen.	Total	Qual.
1	Zou Kai	China	6.900	8.800		15.700	Q
2	Marian Drăgulescu	Romania	6.700	8.866		15.566	Q
3	Alexander Shatilov	Israel	6.700	8.800		15.500	Q
4	Diego Hypólito	Brazil	6.800	8.700		15.500	Q
5	Kōhei Uchimura	Japan	6.500	8.966		15.466	Q
6	Steven Legendre	United States	6.800	8.633		15.433	Q
7	Tomás González	Chile	6.500	8.900		15.400	Q
8	Flavius Koczi	Romania	6.600	8.800		15.400	Q
9	Jacob Dalton	United States	6.600	8.766		15.366	R
10	Eleftherios Kosmidis	Greece	6.700	8.766	0.1	15.366	R
11	Brandon O'Neill	Canada	6.400	8.933		15.333	R

== Pommel horse ==
Rank	Gymnast	Nation	D Score	E Score	Pen.	Total	Qual.
1	Krisztián Berki	Hungary	6.700	9.166		15.866	Q
2	Louis Smith	Great Britain	6.900	8.700		15.600	Q
3	Prashanth Sellathurai	Australia	6.600	8.966		15.566	Q
4	Sašo Bertoncelj	Slovenia	6.500	9.000		15.500	Q
5	Kōhei Uchimura	Japan	6.300	9.133		15.433	Q
6	Teng Haibin	China	6.400	8.900		15.300	Q
7	Cyril Tommasone	France	6.400	8.900		15.300	Q
8	Vid Hidvegi	Hungary	6.400	8.866		15.266	Q
9	Alexander Naddour	United States	6.200	9.033		15.233	R
10	Donna-Donny Truyens	Belgium	6.300	8.933		15.233	R
11	Kenya Kobayashi	Japan	6.300	8.900		15.200	R

== Rings ==
Rank	Gymnast	Nation	D Score	E Score	Pen.	Total	Qual.
1	Chen Yibing	China	6.800	8.900		15.700	Q
2	Arthur Zanetti	Brazil	6.500	9.033		15.533	Q
3	Koji Yamamuro	Japan	6.700	8.833		15.533	Q
4	Yuri van Gelder	Netherlands	6.500	8.883		15.383	Q
5	Jonathan Horton	United States	6.700	8.666		15.366	Q
6	Matteo Morandi	Italy	6.800	8.566		15.366	Q
7	Regulo Carmona	Venezuela	6.700	8.633		15.333	Q
8	Kōhei Uchimura	Japan	6.500	8.733		15.233	Q
9	Yusuke Tanaka	Japan	6.200	8.958		15.158	-
10	Denis Ablyazin	Russia	6.600	8.533		15.133	R
11	Nikita Ignatyev	Russia	6.300	8.800		15.100	R
12	Kazuhito Tanaka	Japan	6.000	9.033		15.033	-
13	John Orozco	United States	6.200	8.833		15.033	R

== Vault ==
Rank	Gymnast	Nation	D Score	E Score	Pen.	Score 1	D Score	E Score	Pen.	Score 2	Total	Qual.
Rank	Gymnast	Nation	Vault 1				Vault 2				Total	Qual.
1	Thomas Bouhail	France	7.000	9.608		16.608	7.000	9.633		16.633	16.620	Q
2	Makoto Okiguchi	Japan	7.000	9.266		16.266	7.000	9.433		16.433	16.349	Q
3	Marian Drăgulescu	Romania	7.000	9.400		16.400	7.200	9.066		16.266	16.333	Q
4	Shek Wai-hung	Hong Kong	6.600	9.508		16.108	7.000	9.366		16.366	16.237	Q
5	Anton Golotsutskov	Russia	7.000	9.266		16.266	7.000	9.300	0.1	16.200	16.233	Q
6	Yang Hak-seon	South Korea	7.000	9.433		16.433	7.000	9.100	0.1	16.000	16.216	Q
7	Dzmitry Kaspiarovich	Belarus	7.000	9.333		16.333	7.000	9.066		16.066	16.199	Q
8	Jeffrey Wammes	Netherlands	6.800	9.433		16.233	6.600	9.500		16.100	16.166	Q
9	Denis Ablyazin	Russia	7.000	9.400		16.400	6.400	9.491		15.891	16.145	R
10	Ha Thanh Nguyen	Vietnam	6.600	9.066		15.666	7.000	9.600		16.600	16.133	R
11	Diego Hypólito	Brazil	6.600	9.375		15.975	6.800	9.400		16.200	16.087	R

== Parallel bars ==
Rank	Gymnast	Nation	D Score	E Score	Pen.	Total	Qual.
1	Feng Zhe	China	6.800	8.708		15.508	Q
2	Yann Cucherat	France	6.400	9.033		15.433	Q
3	Zhang Chenglong	China	6.500	8.900		15.400	Q
4	Kōhei Uchimura	Japan	6.400	8.991		15.391	Q
5	Marius Berbecar	Romania	6.400	8.966		15.366	Q
6	Danell Leyva	United States	6.400	8.966		15.366	Q
7	Kahuhito Tanaka	Japan	6.800	8.566		15.366	Q
8	Vasileios Tsolakidis	Greece	6.500	8.800		15.300	Q
9	Guo Weiyang	China	6.300	8.941		15.241	-
10	Philipp Boy	Germany	6.300	8.933		15.233	R
11	Yusuke Tanaka	Japan	6.400	8.766		15.166	-
12	Anton Fokin	Uzbekistan	6.500	8.666		15.166	R
13	Adam Kierzowski	Poland	6.500	8.666		15.166	R

== Horizontal bar ==
Rank	Gymnast	Nation	D Score	E Score	Pen.	Total	Qual.
1	Yusuke Tanaka	Japan	7.000	8.600		15.600	Q
2	Kōhei Uchimura	Japan	6.700	8.833		15.533	Q
3	Fabian Hambüchen	Germany	7.400	8.100		15.500	Q
4	John Orozco	United States	6.400	8.866		15.266	Q
5	Philipp Boy	Germany	7.400	7.866		15.266	Q
6	Zou Kai	China	7.300	7.866		15.166	Q
7	Epke Zonderland	Netherlands	7.000	8.133		15.133	Q
8	Zhang Chenglong	China	7.100	8.033		15.133	Q
9	Jonathan Horton	United States	6.800	8.266		15.066	R
10	Marijo Možnik	Croatia	6.800	8.133		14.933	R
11	Emin Garibov	Russia	7.100	7.833		14.933	R
