= Gymnastics at the 2012 Summer Olympics – Men's vault =

Olympic gymnastics event

Men's vault at the Games of the XXX Olympiad
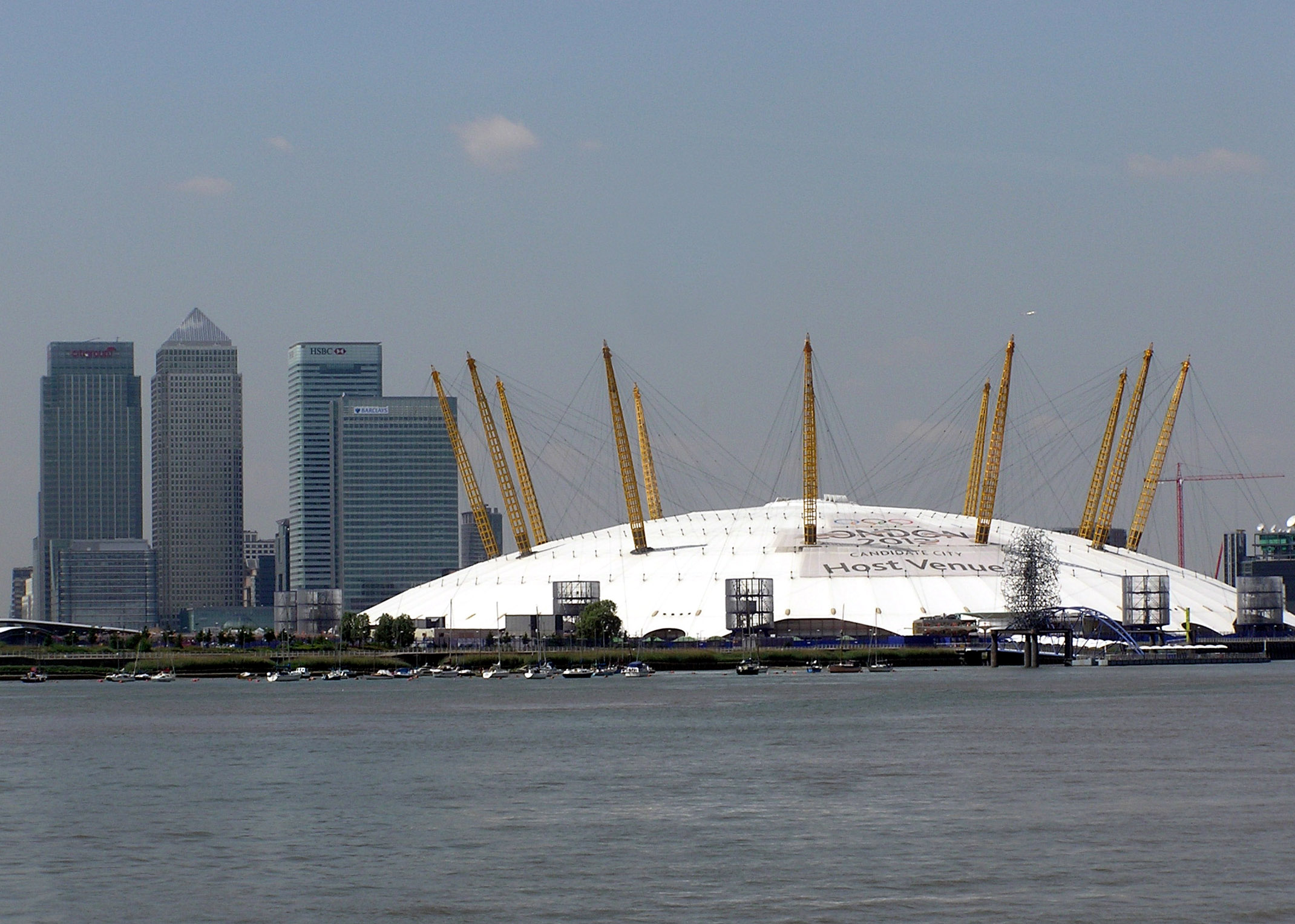
- Canary wharf and dome London
- Venue: North Greenwich Arena 1
- Dates: 28 July (qualifying); 6 August (final)
- Competitors: 17 from 14 nations
- Winning score: 16.533

Medalists
1st place, gold medalist(s)		Yang Hak-seon; South Korea
2nd place, silver medalist(s)		Denis Ablyazin; Russia
3rd place, bronze medalist(s)		Igor Radivilov; Ukraine

The men's vault competition at the 2012 Summer Olympics was held at the North Greenwich Arena on 6 August. It included 17 competitors from 14 nations.

Yang Hak-seon of South Korea won the gold, his nation's first victory in the event and first medal since 1996. Denis Ablyazin of Russia took silver, while Igor Radivilov earned Ukraine's first medal in the event as an independent nation.

== Background ==
This was the 23rd appearance of the event at the Olympics. Two of the eight finalists from 2008 returned: seventh-place finisher Flavius Koczi of Romania and eighth-place finisher Isaac Botella of Spain. Yang Hak-seon of South Korea was the 2011 world champion and the favorite, particularly with the 2010 world champion, Thomas Bouhail of France, injured and unable to compete.

Chile and Hong Kong made their debuts in the men's vault competition. The United States made its 20th appearance, the most of any nation.

== Competition format ==
The top eight vaulters in the qualification phase (with a limit of two per country) advanced to the apparatus final, with only those gymnasts who performed two vaults eligible to advance. The two scores were averaged to determine rankings.

Qualification scores were then ignored, with only final-round scores counting.

== Qualification results ==
Rank	Gymnast	Vault 1				Vault 2				Total	Notes
Rank	Gymnast	D	E	Pen.	Vault Score	D	E	Pen.	Vault Score	Total	Notes
1	Denis Ablyazin (RUS)	7.000	9.300		16.300	7.200	9.233		16.433	16.366	Q
2	Yang Hak-seon (KOR)	7.000	9.233		16.233	7.000	9.433		16.433	16.333	Q
3	Tomás González (CHI)	7.000	9.433		16.433	6.600	9.366	0.1	15.866	16.149	Q
4	Sam Mikulak (USA)	7.000	9.300		16.300	6.600	9.266		15.866	16.083	Q
5	Kristian Thomas (GBR)	7.000	9.300	0.1	16.200	6.600	9.166		15.766	15.983	Q
6	Flavius Koczi (ROM)	7.000	9.166	0.1	16.066	7.000	8.933	0.1	15.833	15.949	Q
7	Isaac Botella (ESP)	6.600	9.266		15.866	6.600	9.200		15.800	15.833	Q
8	Igor Radivilov (UKR)	7.000	9.266		16.266	7.000	8.633	0.3	15.333	15.799	Q
9	Dmitry Kasperovich (BLR)	7.000	9.333		16.333	7.000	8.300	0.3	15.000	15.666	R1
10	Matteo Angioletti (ITA)	7.000	8.866	0.3	15.566	6.600	9.000		15.600	15.583	R2
11	Oleg Verniaiev (UKR)	7.000	9.333		16.333	6.600	8.466	0.3	14.766	15.549	R3
12	Mohamed El-Saharty (EGY)	6.200	9.266		15.466	6.200	9.300		15.500	15.483	
13	Shek Wai Hung (HKG)	6.600	8.400	0.1	14.900	7.000	9.033		16.033	15.466	
14	Jake Dalton (USA)	7.000	9.200	0.3	15.900	6.600	8.266	0.1	14.766	15.333	
15	Artur Davtyan (ARM)	6.200	8.266	0.3	14.166	6.200	9.300		15.500	14.833	
16	Kim Soo-myun (KOR)	6.600	9.066		15.666	4.200	8.958		13.158	14.412	
17	Koji Yamamuro (JPN)	7.000	8.633	0.3	15.333	4.200	9.000		13.200	14.266	

== Final results ==
Rank	Gymnast	Nation	Vault 1				Vault 2				Total
Rank	Gymnast	Nation	D Score	E Score	Pen.	Vault Score	D Score	E Score	Pen.	Vault Score	Total
1st place, gold medalist(s)	Yang Hak-seon	South Korea	7.400	9.066		16.466	7.000	9.600		16.600	16.533
2nd place, silver medalist(s)	Denis Ablyazin	Russia	7.000	9.433		16.433	7.200	9.166		16.366	16.399
3rd place, bronze medalist(s)	Igor Radivilov	Ukraine	7.000	9.400		16.400	7.000	9.233		16.233	16.316
4	Tomás González	Chile	7.000	9.400		16.400	6.600	9.366		15.966	16.183
5	Sam Mikulak	United States	7.000	9.100		16.100	6.600	9.400		16.000	16.050
6	Isaac Botella	Spain	6.600	9.300		15.900	6.600	9.233		15.833	15.866
7	Flavius Koczi	Romania	7.000	9.200	0.1	16.100	6.200	9.066	0.1	15.166	15.633
8	Kristian Thomas	Great Britain	7.000	9.366		16.366	6.600	8.200	0.1	14.700	15.533
