= Aronov =

Aronov (Cyrillic: Аро́нов) and Aronoff are Slavic (Russian or Soviet) Jewish family names. Notable persons with these names include:

== Aronov ==
- Arkady Aronov (1934–1994), Russian-Israeli theoretical condensed matter physicist
- Boris Aronov (born 1963), American computer scientist
- Michael Aronov (born 1962), American actor and playwright
- Raisa Aronova (1920–1982), Soviet aviator and KGB agent

== Aronoff ==
- Kenny Aronoff (born 1953), American musician
- Mark Aronoff (born 1949), Canadian-American morphologist, linguist, and professor
- Stan Aronoff (1932–2024), American politician

== See also ==
- Shara L. Aranoff, Chairman of the U.S. International Trade Commission from 2005 to 2014
- Aronoff Center, performing arts center in downtown Cincinnati
- Aronow, surname
- Bishop v. Aronov, lawsuit
