= Aronow =

Aronow is a surname. Notable people with the surname include:

- Abraham Aronow (born 1940), American physician and photographer
- Donald Aronow (1927–1987), American boat designer, builder, and racer

== See also ==
- Aronow v. United States
- Aronov
