= Aronovich =

Aronovich is a surname

- Felix Aronovich, Israeli artistic gymnast
- Lola Aronovich (born 1967), Argentine-Brazilian feminist blogger and educator
- Ricardo Aronovich (born 1930), Argentinian cinematographer

== See also ==
- Aaronovich
- Arnovich
- Aronowicz
