= Aaronovich =

Aaronovich, Aaronovitch or Aharonovich (Russian: Ааронович) is a Russian-Jewish patronymic surname literally meaning "son of Aaron". Notable people with the surname include:

- Igor Aharonovich (born 1982), Australian physicist
- Yitzhak Aharonovich (born 1950), Israeli politician
- Sam Aaronovitch (1919–1998), economist and British communist activist and his sons:
  - David Aaronovitch (born 1954), English journalist, broadcaster, and author
  - Owen Aaronovitch (born 1956), English actor
  - Ben Aaronovitch (born 1964), English writer

== See also ==
- Aronowicz
- Aronov
- Aronin
- Aaronovitch
- Arnovich
- Aronovich
