= Aronowicz =

Aronowitz or Aronovitz is a Jewish patronymic surname literally meaning "son of Aaron". Notable people with the surname include:

== Aronowitz ==
- Alfred "Al" Gilbert Aronowitz (1928–2005), American rock journalist
- Cecil Aronowitz (1916–1978), British violist
- Milton Aronowitz, American college football head coach
- Robert Allan Aronowitz (born 1953), American physician
- Stanley Aronowitz (1933–2021), professor of sociology

== Aronovitz ==
- Abraham "Abe" Aronovitz (1899–1960), Jewish American lawyer and mayor
- Sidney Aronovitz (1920–1997), American lawyer and United States federal judge
  - Sidney M. Aronovitz United States Courthouse

== Aronowicz ==
- Ike Aronowicz (1923–2009), Israeli sailor and captain of the immigrant ship SS Exodus

== See also ==
- Aronovitz Business News
- Aaronovitch
- Arnovich
- Aronovich
- Arno (disambiguation)
