= Bishop v. Aronov =

1991 legal case

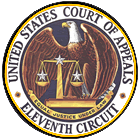
- Court: United States Court of Appeals for the Eleventh Circuit
- Full case name: Phillip A. Bishop v. Aaron M. Aronov, Winton M. Blount, O.H. Delchamps, Jr., Sandrall Hullett, Guy Hunt, William Henry Mitchell, John T. Oliver, Jr., Thomas E. Rast, Yetta G. Samford, Jr., Martha H. Simms, Wayne Teague, Cleophus Thomas, Jr., George S. Shirley, Cordell Wynn, all in their official capacities as members of the Board of Trustees of the University of Alabama
- Decided: March 15, 1991
- Citations: 926 F.2d 1066; 59 U.S.L.W. 2583; 65 Ed. Law Rep. 1109

Case history
- Prior history: District Court ruled in favor of Bishop

Court membership
- Judges sitting: Emmett Ripley Cox, Stanley F. Birch, Jr., Floyd R. Gibson

Case opinions
- The University of Alabama can restrict a professor’s religious expressions during instructional time to prevent the appearance of endorsing religion, without violating First Amendment rights
- Majority: Gibson

Bishop v. Aronov, 926 F.2d 1066 (11th Cir. 1991), is a significant case concerning the balance between academic freedom and the Establishment Clause within public universities. The United States Court of Appeals for the Eleventh Circuit addressed whether a public university could restrict a professor’s religious expressions during instructional time without infringing upon First Amendment rights.

== Background ==
Phillip A. Bishop, an assistant professor of exercise physiology at the University of Alabama, occasionally shared his Christian beliefs during class sessions, framing them as his personal “bias.” In April 1987, he organized an optional after-class lecture titled “Evidences of God in Human Physiology,” which discussed the complexity of the human body and suggested divine creation over evolutionary processes. Attendance was voluntary and did not influence students’ grades. However, some students expressed concerns about potential coercion, given the timing of the lecture before final exams.

In response to these concerns, Carl Westerfield, Head of the Health, Physical Education, and Recreation Department, issued a memorandum instructing Bishop to cease interjecting religious beliefs during instructional periods and to stop holding optional classes presenting a “Christian perspective” on academic topics.

The university’s administration upheld these directives, emphasizing the need to prevent any appearance of endorsing religion, in line with the Establishment Clause.

== District Court proceedings ==
Bishop filed a lawsuit against the university’s Board of Trustees, claiming that the restrictions violated his First Amendment rights to free speech and free exercise of religion. The United States District Court for the Northern District of Alabama ruled in favor of Bishop, granting summary judgment and enjoining the university from enforcing the restrictions.

== Appeal and Eleventh Circuit decision ==
The university appealed the decision to the Eleventh Circuit. The appellate court reversed the district court’s ruling, holding that the university’s actions did not violate Bishop’s constitutional rights. The court reasoned that during instructional time, the university classroom is not an open forum; therefore, the university has the authority to determine appropriate curriculum content and limit discussions to relevant subject matter. The court emphasized that the university’s directives aimed to avoid the appearance of endorsing religion, thereby adhering to Establishment Clause requirements.
