= Raisa Aronova =

Soviet aviator (1920-1982); Hero of the Soviet Union

Raisa Yermolayevna Aronova
- Раиса Ермолаевна Аронова
- Born: 10 January 1920; Saratov, Russian SFSR
- Died: 20 December 1982 (aged 62); Moscow, Soviet Union
- Military career
- Allegiance: Soviet Union
- Branch: Soviet Air Force
- Service years: 1941–1962
- Rank: Major
- Unit: 46th Guards Night Bomber Regiment
- Conflicts: World War II
- Awards: Hero of the Soviet Union
- Other work: Author

Raisa Yermolayevna Aronova (Russian: Раиса Ермолаевна Аронова; 10 January 1920 – 20 December 1982) was a Soviet Polikarpov Po-2 navigator and pilot of the 588th Night Bomber Regiment, later renamed 46th Guards Night Bomber Regiment during World War II. She received the title of Hero of the Soviet Union on 15 May 1946 for completing 914 night bombing missions against Axis forces.

== Early life ==
Aronova was born in 1920 to a Russian peasant family; her father, who was a railway employee, abandoned the family in 1936. Her mother worked as a washerwoman and was poorly educated, but Aronova went on to complete secondary school in 1938, and became a recipient of the Voroshilov Sharpshooter badge. She then applied to the air force, but was rejected. She was eventually accepted into the Saratov Institute of Agriculture and studied at the local OSOAVIAKhIM aeroclub in her spare time before moving to Moscow, after which she continued flight training at the Moscow aeroclub until the German invasion of the Soviet Union in 1941. She became a member of the Communist Party in 1942.

== World War II ==
Several months after Germany invaded the Soviet union with the launch of Operation Barbarossa, Marina Raskova was granted permission to form three women's aviation regiments. After joining the military in October 1941 she began navigation training at Engels Military Aviation School, and in May 1942 she was deployed to the Southern front with the 588th Night Bomber Regiment, which was later honored with the guards designation and renamed to the 46th Guards Night Bomber Aviation Regiment. Throughout the war she saw combat throughout the Eastern front including on the Ukrainian and Byelorussian Fronts as well as the Battle of the Caucasus, Crimea, Kuban, Kerch, Poland, and Germany, gaining 1,148 flight hours at night and flying 914 combat sorties. During a bombing mission on 28 March 1943 over the village of Kievskaya in Krasnodar she was wounded by a shell fragment fired by ground-based anti-aircraft artillery. Despite her injury she continued navigating so the plane could land safely. When she went to the hospital seventeen shrapnel fragments were removed from her body, but she returned to flying in May less than two months later. That same year she attended an accelerated piloting course and became certified to fly as a pilot on the Po-2 and soon began flying missions as a pilot. Her bombing missions destroyed an estimated four artillery batteries, three searchlights, three ferries, two warehouses of fuel and ammunition, and eight cars.

== Later life ==
From May to October 1945 Aronova remained in Poland where her regiment was assigned until it was disbanded in October 1945, but Aronova remained in the military until 1962. After graduating from the Military Institute of Foreign Languages in 1952 she held various positions in the Communist party and the Soviet government, becoming a senior officer in the Ministry of Internal Affairs in May 1953. She later worked for the KGB starting in 1954 where she encrypted agency correspondence, attaining the rank of Major in 1960 before retiring in 1961. After retiring from the military she wrote a book about her experiences in the war titled Ночные ведьмы ("Night Witches") which was published in 1969. She died in December 1982 and was buried in the Kuntsevo Cemetery.

== Awards ==
- Hero of the Soviet Union (15 May 1946)
- Order of Lenin (15 May 1946)
- Two Orders of the Red Banner (25 October 1943 and 22 May 1945)
- Order of the Red Star (9 September 1942)
- Medal "For Battle Merit" (19 November 1951)

== See also ==
- List of female Heroes of the Soviet Union
- Polina Gelman
- Natalya Meklin
