= Rokas Guščinas =

Lithuanian artistic gymnast (born 1991)

- Born: 6 January 1991 (age 35) Kaunas, Lithuania
- Height: 172 cm (5 ft 8 in)

Gymnastics career
- Discipline: Men's artistic gymnastics
- Country represented: Lithuania

Rokas Guščinas (born 6 January 1991) is a Lithuanian artistic gymnast. He represented Lithuania at the 2012 Summer Olympics.

== Gymnastics career ==
Guščinas began gymnastics when he was five years old. He competed at his first World Championships in 2007 and finished 121st in the all-around during the qualification round. At the 2008 Junior European Championships, he qualified for the horizontal bar final and finished fifth.

Guščinas finished 100th in the all-around qualifications at the 2010 World Championships. He competed at the 2012 Olympic Test Event and finished 42nd in the all-around, earning a berth for the 2012 Summer Olympics. At the Olympic Games, he only competed on the pommel horse and finished 17th in the qualification round, missing the final by 0.534 points.

At the 2013 World Championships, Guščinas finished 25th in the all-around qualification round and was the first reserve for the final. Then at the 2014 World Championships, he finished 57th in the all-around qualification round. He advanced to the all-around final at the 2015 European Championships and finished 14th. He then represented Lithuania at the 2015 European Games and qualified for the all-around final, finishing eighth. Additionally, he was the first reserve for the rings final. He then finished 59th in the all-around qualifications at the 2015 World Championships.

Guščinas was unable to compete for qualification to the 2016 Summer Olympics due to a wrist injury. He had a total of five surgeries on his wrist and missed multiple years of competition. He announced his retirement after the 2019 World Championships due to the injuries.

== Post-gymnastics ==
Since his retirement from gymnastics, Guščinas has competed in ultramarathons. He has opened multiple gymnastics clubs in Lithuania.
