= Jihoon Kim =

South Korean operatic bass

Jihoon Kim 김지훈
- Born: South Korea
- Education: Seoul National University; Conservatorio Giuseppe Verdi
- Occupation: Opera singer
- Instrument: Bass
- Years active: 2011–present
- Website: www.jihoonkimbass.com

Jihoon Kim (Korean: 김지훈) is a South Korean operatic bass based in the United Kingdom. He was a Principal Artist at the Royal Opera House, Covent Garden.

== Education ==
Kim studied voice at Seoul National University in South Korea and continued his training at the Conservatorio Giuseppe Verdi in Italy. From 2011 to 2013, he was a member of the Jette Parker Young Artists Programme at the Royal Opera House.

== Career ==
Following the Jette Parker programme, Kim sang with The Royal Opera as a Principal Artist (2014–2015). During his tenure with the company, he performed 25 roles in over 200 performances.

His work with the Royal Opera includes filmed productions, such as the Ghost of Hector in David McVicar's production of Les Troyens and appearances in Robert le Diable.

In concert, he has performed as a bass soloist in works such as Verdi's Requiem and Berlioz's L'enfance du Christ.

== Critical reception ==
Kim's performances have been reviewed by international critics. In 2016, a review in Bachtrack highlighted his appearance as the Old Hebrew in Samson et Dalila at the Palau de les Arts Reina Sofía in Valencia, describing his singing as "the finest performance of the evening" and noting his "rare quality of true legato."

Opera Today reviewed his performance in Robert le Diable at Covent Garden, noting his stage presence.

In 2015, a review in Bachtrack regarding his performance as Silva in Verdi's Ernani with the Chelsea Opera Group described his singing as "pure magic."

A 2017 WhatsOnStage review of La bohème highlighted his performance as Colline.

== Repertoire ==
His operatic repertoire includes roles in Italian, German, and French opera.

Opera

- Verdi: Filippo II (Don Carlo), Banco (Macbeth), Silva (Ernani), Ferrando (Il trovatore)
- Gounod: Méphistophélès (Faust)
- Mozart: Leporello (Don Giovanni), Sarastro (Die Zauberflöte)
- Puccini: Colline (La bohème), Timur (Turandot)
- Saint-Saëns: The Old Hebrew (Samson et Dalila)
- Rossini: Don Basilio (Il barbiere di Siviglia)
- Berlioz: Ghost of Hector (Les Troyens)

Concert & Oratorio

- Verdi: Requiem
- Mozart: Requiem
- Beethoven: Symphony No. 9
- Rossini: Petite messe solennelle
- Berlioz: Hérode (L'enfance du Christ)
- Shostakovich: Symphony No. 14
