= Abraham Aronow =

American physician and photographer

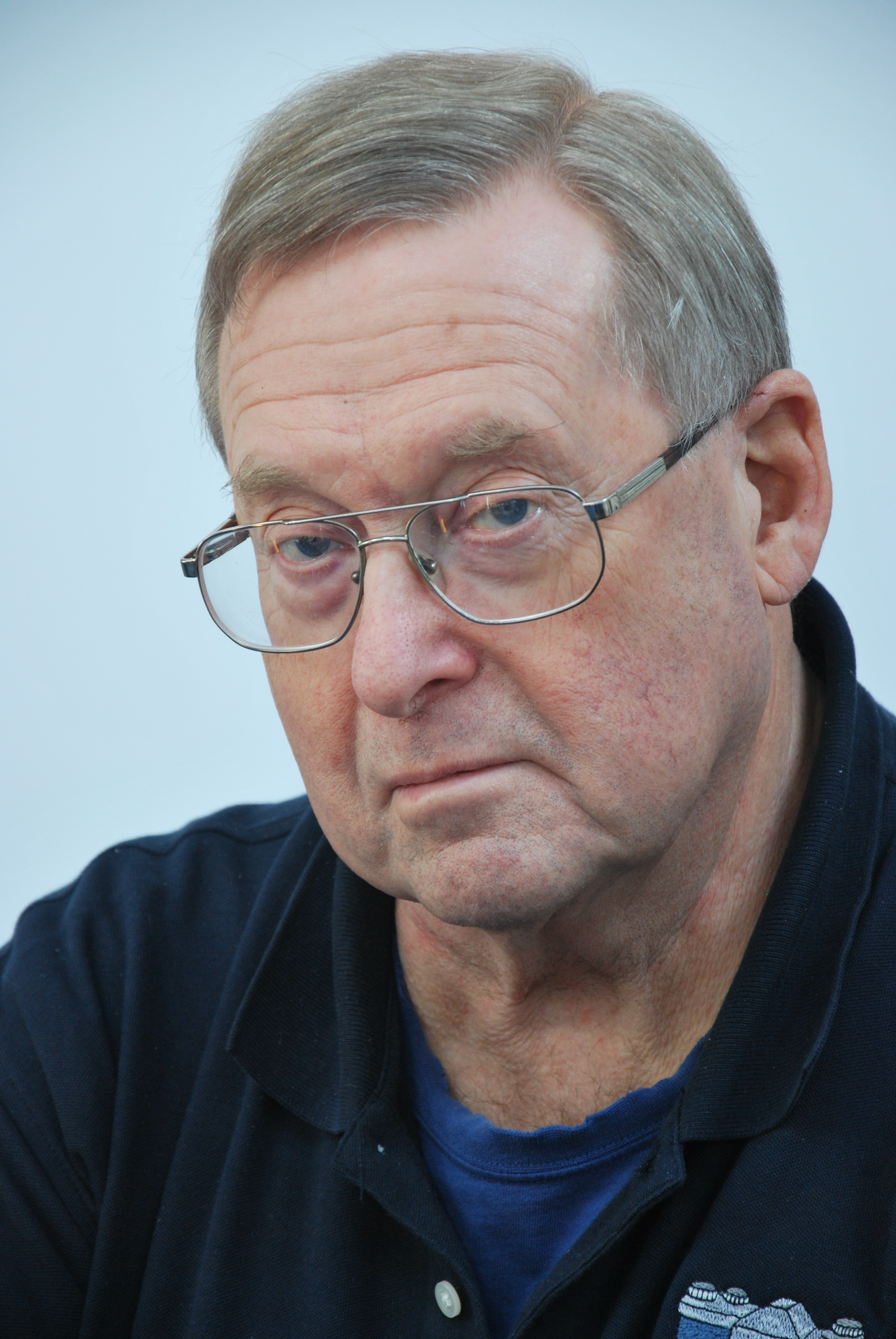
- Born: June 3, 1940 (age 86); Brooklyn, New York City, U.S.
- Education: MIT; Harvard Medical School
- Occupation: Physician
- Known for: Monochrome portraits of prominent photographers

Abraham "Abe" Aronow (born June 3, 1940) is an American physician and photographer best known for his monochrome portraits of prominent photographers.

== Biography ==
Abraham Aronow was born in Brooklyn, New York City and grew up in New Haven, Connecticut. He graduated from James Hillhouse High School, received his BS at the MIT School of Humanities, Arts, and Social Sciences, and his MD at Harvard Medical School. He served as an intern at New York's Bellevue Hospital, and as a commissioned officer in the United States Public Health Service for two years. In 1969 he testified before the Senate Committee on the District of Columbia, recommending the establishment of Federal centers, similar to methadone clinics, to freely distribute narcotics, stating "Most addicts, if assured of a regular supply of drugs, would not be motivated to commit violent crimes."

That year he and his wife Alice moved to San Francisco, where they have lived ever since. He served as a clinical instructor and assistant clinical professor at the UCSF School of Medicine in the 1970s. Aronow continued to work as a physician until his retirement in 2007.

== Photography ==
Aronow's father was an amateur photographer and instructed him in the art at an early age. In 1981, while working at Ralph K. Davies Medical Center, one of his patients was the famous landscape photographer Ansel Adams. The two talked extensively, and Adams later invited Aronow to a filming session attended by the surviving members of Group f/64 and other photographers such as Beaumont Newhall.

This was the start of a decades-long project in which Abe Aronow made portraits of prominent photographers and other figures. He initially took many of these using artificial lights and strobes, and transitioned to mostly natural lighting in the 2000s. His collection currently consists of over 1,200 such photographs, including portraits of Edmund Teske, Oliver Gagliani, Morley Baer, Ernst Haas, Aaron Siskind, Ruth Bernhard, André Kertész, Roy DeCarava, Barbara Morgan, and Yousuf Karsh.

In 2007, Aronow's photographs were featured in the documentary film Black White + Gray: A Portrait of Sam Wagstaff and Robert Mapplethorpe. Many of his prints are housed in the photographic collections of university libraries – 196 at the Harry Ransom Center at the University of Texas at Austin, 185 at Stanford University Libraries, and over 500 at Yale University's Beinecke Rare Book & Manuscript Library.
