= Robert Aronowitz =

American physician and medical historian (born 1953)

- Born: December 12, 1953 (age 72); Brooklyn
- Education: University of Michigan; Columbia University Teachers College; Yale Medical School
- Occupations: Professor, University of Pennsylvania
- Title: Chair, Department of History and Sociology of Science

Robert Alan Aronowitz (born December 12, 1953) is an American physician and medical historian based at the University of Pennsylvania. He is the author of Making Sense of Illness, and Unnatural History: Breast Cancer and American Society.

== Personal life ==
Aronowitz was born in Brooklyn New York City in 1953 to Nat and Eve Aronowitz. He grew up with his older brother and sister. He attended Samuel J. Tilden High School, until he graduated at the age of 16. He currently resides in Lower Merion where he lives with his wife of 30 years and his two children.

== Education and professional life ==
Aronowitz studied linguistics before receiving his M.D. from Yale. After a residency in Internal Medicine, he received training in the history of medicine as a Robert Wood Johnson Foundation Clinical Scholar. He taught at the Robert Wood Johnson Medical School and practiced medicine at Cooper Hospital before arriving at Penn in 1999. At Penn, Dr. Aronowitz also holds a joint appointment in the Department of Family Practice and Community Medicine. He was the founding director of the Health and Societies Program, and co-directs the Robert Wood Johnson Foundation Health & Society Scholars Program, a post-doctoral and research program focused on population health. He is currently in the midst of a project on the history of health risks in American medicine and society, for which he is the recipient of an Investigator Award in Health Policy from the Robert Wood Johnson Foundation.

== Books ==
Aronowitz’s first book, Making Sense of Illness: Science, Society, and Disease (Cambridge University Press, 1998) explores changing disease definitions and meanings in the 20th century. The Washington Post's review said: "Making Sense of Illness succeeds as both a medical monograph and a book for the lay reader because it speaks to such deep matters of health and health care delivery, and accomplishes its task in relatively jargon-free language. This is a book for the thinking reader".

His second book, Unnatural History: Breast Cancer and American Society was published in October 2007 by Cambridge University Press. The publisher offers this summary: In the early 19th century in the United States, cancer in the breast was a rare disease. Now it seems that breast cancer is everywhere. Written by a medical historian who is also a doctor, Unnatural History tells how and why this happened. Rather than there simply being more disease, breast cancer has entered the bodies of so many American women and the concerns of nearly all the rest, mostly as a result of how we have detected, labeled, and responded to the disease. The book traces changing definitions and understandings of breast cancer, the experience of breast cancer sufferers, clinical and public health practices, and individual and societal fears.
