= Paolo Ottavi =

Italian artistic gymnast

- Born: 7 January 1986 (age 40) Fermo, Italy
- Height: 1.7 m (5 ft 7 in)

Gymnastics career
- Discipline: Men's artistic gymnastics
- Country represented: Italy
- Club: Aeronautica Militare
- Head coach: Marco Fortuna
Medal record
Men's artistic gymnastics
Mediterranean Games
Gold medal – first place	2009 Pescara	Team
Silver medal – second place	2013 Mersin	Team

Paolo Ottavi (born 7 January 1986) is an Italian artistic gymnast. He represented Italy at the 2012 Summer Olympics, finishing 22nd in the individual all-around competition.

Ottavi was born in Fermo and began his gymnastics training at the age of six. He has been a member of Italian Senior National Team and the Centro Sportivo Aeronautica Militare since 2008.
