= Samuel Piasecký =

Slovak gymnast (born 1984)

- Born: 31 October 1984 (age 41) Košice, Czechoslovakia
- Height: 1.73 m (5 ft 8 in)

Gymnastics career
- Discipline: Men's artistic gymnastics
- Country represented: Slovakia
- Club: Dukla Banská Bystrica

Samuel Piasecký (born 31 October 1984) is a Slovak gymnast. He competed at the 2012 Summer Olympics.
