= Steven Legendre =

American artistic gymnast

- Full name: Steven Michael Legendre
- Born: May 5, 1989 (age 37) Port Jefferson, New York, U.S.
- Height: 5 ft 7 in (170 cm)

Gymnastics career
- Discipline: Men's artistic gymnastics
- Country represented: United States; (2008–2017)
- College team: Oklahoma Sooners
- Gym: Bart Conner Gymnastics Academy; Team Hilton Honors; World Olympic Gymnastics Academy
- Head coach: Mark Williams
- Assistant coaches: Rustam Sharipov, Daniel Furney
Medal record
Men's artistic gymnastics
Representing United States
Event	1st	2nd	3rd
World Championships	0	1	1
Pan American Games	1	0	0
Pacific Rim Championships	1	0	1
Total	2	1	2
World Championships
Silver medal – second place	2013 Antwerp	Vault
Bronze medal – third place	2011 Tokyo	Team
Pan American Games
Gold medal – first place	2015 Toronto	Team
Pacific Rim Championships
Gold medal – first place	2010 Melbourne	Team
Bronze medal – third place	2010 Melbourne	Floor
- Awards: Nissen-Emery Award (2011)

Steven Michael Legendre (born May 5, 1989) is a retired American gymnast who competed for the University of Oklahoma Sooners men's gymnastics team from 2008 to 2011 and was a member of the United States men's national artistic gymnastics team.

== Early life and education ==
Steven was born to Raymond and Lisa Legendre, and has 2 sisters (Jaime and Jessica) and one brother, Michael. Jessica played softball for the University of Oklahoma. He attended Earl L. Vandermeulen High School in Port Jefferson, New York, where he competed on the wrestling team, and then Spring Creek Academy in Plano, Texas, when he began training under Yuri Kartsev at the World Olympic Gymnastics Academy. On leaving high school he was recruited by the University of Minnesota, the University of Illinois, and Ohio State University; he ultimately decided to attend the University of Oklahoma.

== Gymnastics career ==
=== NCAA career ===
During his collegiate career, Legendre won 12 All-America honors and 6 NCAA titles. In 2008, he became the first Sooner men's gymnast to win 2 NCAA event titles (floor and vault). In 2009, he won the all-around, floor, and vault titles – the highest number of titles by a gymnast that year. In 2010, he claimed his 3rd consecutive floor title - tying him with Jonathan Horton's Oklahoma gymnastics record. In 2011, Legendre won the Nissen Award (the "Heisman" of men's gymnastics).

=== International career ===
Legendre joined the Senior National Team in 2008 and was chosen to compete in the 2009 World Artistic Gymnastics Championships in London, England. He made the floor final where he placed 8th. The following year he traveled to Melbourne where he was part of the gold medal team in the Pacific Rim Championships, also winning the bronze medal for the floor exercise. Later he traveled to the 2010 World Artistic Gymnastics Championships in Rotterdam where he helped the team to a 4th-place finish in the team competition and again came 8th in the floor finals. In 2011 he was part of the bronze medal-winning team at the 2011 World Artistic Gymnastics Championships. He again competed in the floor final, where he managed to improve on his previous rankings at past world competitions, finishing in 5th place behind bronze medalists Alexander Shatilov and Diego Hypólito. In 2013, he competed at the 2013 World Artistic Gymnastics Championships in Antwerp, Belgium. He tied with Hypolito for 5th place once again in the floor final and earned his first individual world medal, a silver on the vault behind Yang Hak Seon and ahead of Kristian Thomas.

== Personal life ==
On April 27, 2013, he married Alaina Williams. It was announced that he would serve as an assistant coach for the Oklahoma Sooners men's gymnastics team.
