= Roman Kulesza =

Polish gymnast (born 1983)

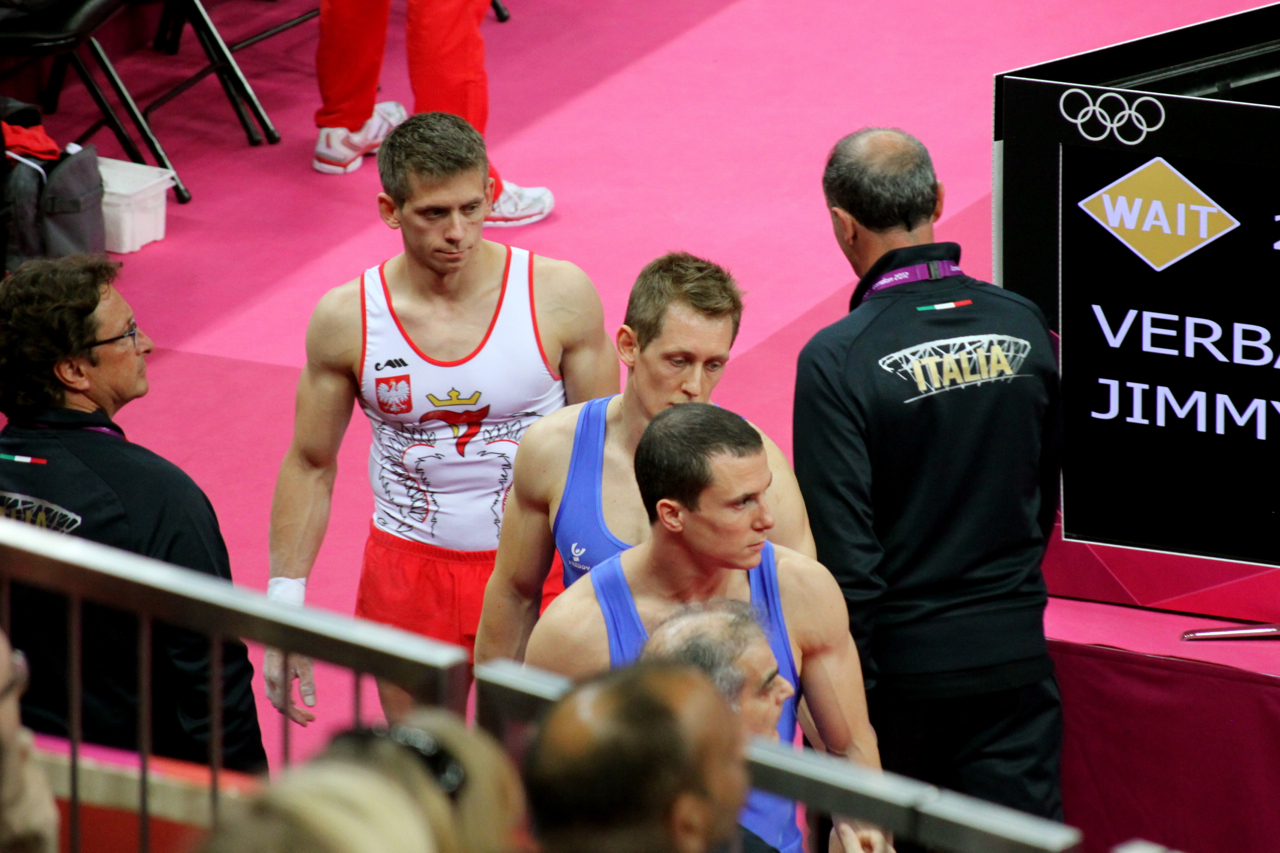
- Kulesza at the 2012 Summer Olympics

Personal information
- Born: 2 March 1983 (age 43) Gdańsk, Polish People's Republic
- Height: 1.70 m (5 ft 7 in)
- Spouse: Marta Pihan-Kulesza

Gymnastics career
- Discipline: Men's artistic gymnastics
- Country represented: Poland
- Club: AZS AWF Biala Podlaska

Roman Kulesza (born 2 March 1983) is a Polish gymnast. He competed at the 2012 Summer Olympics, where he finished 24th in the all around.
