= Shakir Shikhaliyev =

Azerbaijani gymnast (born 1990)

- Şakir Şıxəliyev
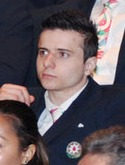
- Shikhaliyev in 2012

Personal information
- Born: 19 November 1990 (age 35) Baku, Azerbaijan

Gymnastics career
- Discipline: Men's artistic gymnastics
- Country represented: Azerbaijan

Shakir Shikhaliyev (born 19 November 1990) is an Azerbaijani gymnast. He competed at the 2012 Summer Olympics.
