= Jimmy Verbaeys =

Belgian artistic gymnast

- Born: 26 August 1993 (age 33) Uccle, Belgium
- Height: 1.63 m (5 ft 4 in)

Gymnastics career
- Discipline: Men's artistic gymnastics
- Country represented: Belgium

Jimmy Verbaeys (Brussels, born 26 August 1993) is a Belgian gymnast.

Verbaeys represented his country at the 2012 Summer Olympics in London, during which he qualified for the individual all-around finals and finished in 21st position with a total score of 85.231 points.

== Gymnastics career ==
=== 2010 ===
- 93rd at the 2010 European Men's Artistic Gymnastics Championships all-round (81,006 points)
- 5th at the 2010 European Men's Artistic Gymnastics Championships pommel horse (13.125 points)

=== 2011 ===
- 67th at the 2011 World Artistic Gymnastics Championships all-round (82,832 points)
- 37th at the 2011 European Artistic Gymnastics Championships all-round (79,650 points)
- 33rd at the 2011 European Artistic Gymnastics Championships pommel horse (13,375 points)

=== 2012 ===
- 21st at the 2012 Summer Olympics in the men's artistic individual all-around finals (85.231 points)
- 2nd in Belgian championship all-round (82,850 points)
