= Dmitrijs Trefilovs =

Latvian gymnast (born 1987)

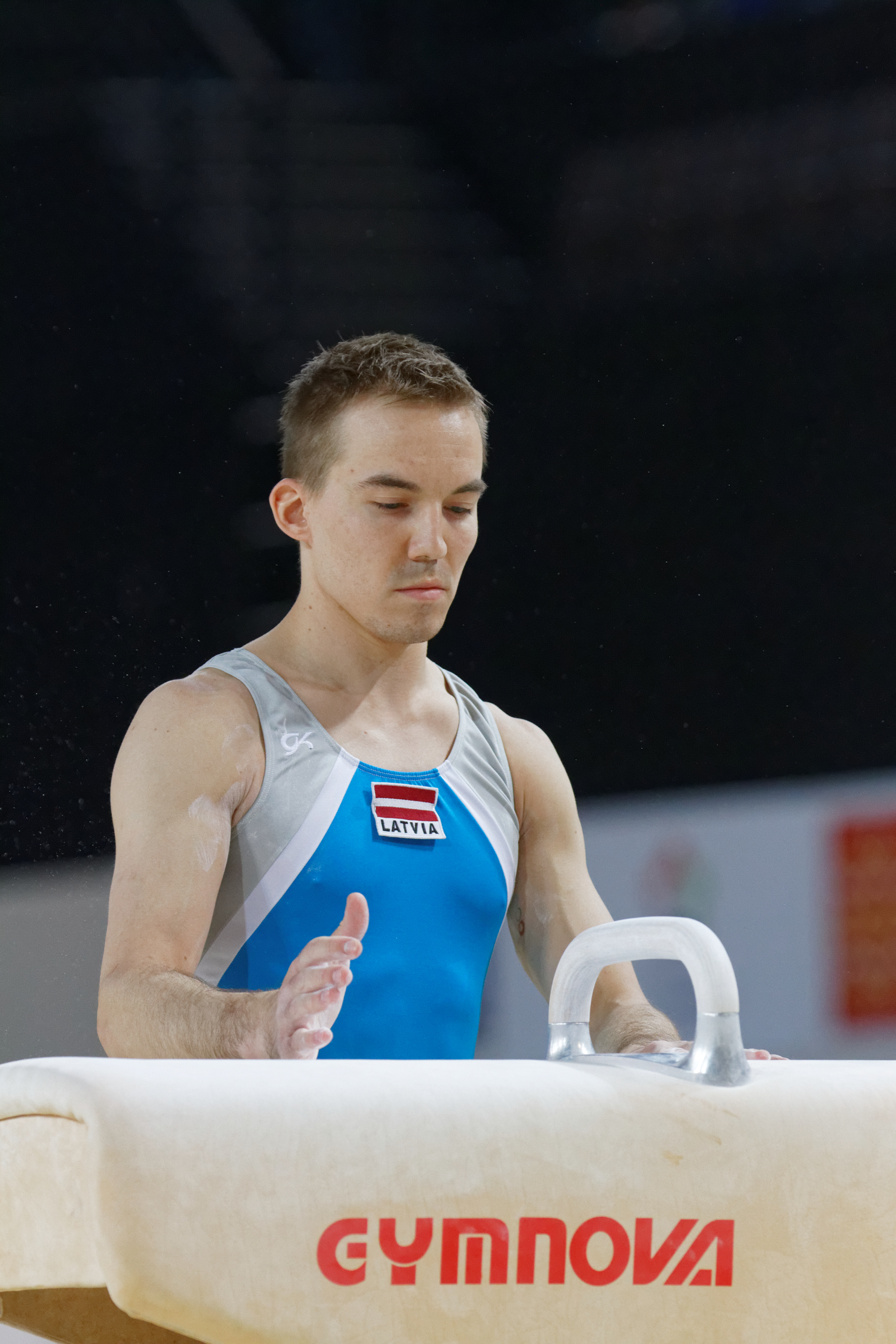
- Dmitrijs Trefilovs at the 2015 European Championships in Montpellier, France.

Personal information
- Born: 13 May 1987 (age 39) Riga, Latvian SSR, USSR (now Latvia)
- Height: 1.70 m (5 ft 7 in)

Gymnastics career
- Discipline: Men's artistic gymnastics
- Country represented: Latvia

Dmitrijs Trefilovs (born 13 May 1987) is a Latvian gymnast. He represented Latvia at 2012 Summer Olympics. Trefilovs was 12th in individual all-around at European Championships 2010.
