= Isaac Botella =

Spanish artistic gymnast

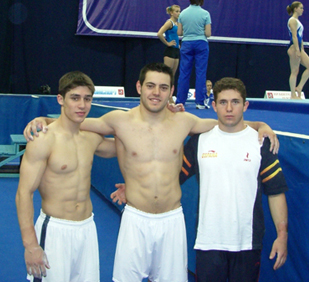

Personal information
- Full name: Isaac Botella Pérez de Landazabal
- Born: June 12, 1984 (age 42) Elche, Alicante, Spain

Gymnastics career
- Discipline: Men's artistic gymnastics
- Country represented: Spain (2012)

Isaac Botella Pérez de Landazabal (born 12 June 1984, in Elche, Alicante) is a Spanish male artistic gymnast and part of the national team. He participated at the 2008 Summer Olympics and 2012 Summer Olympics.
