= Fabián González =

Spanish artistic gymnast

- Born: 8 May 1992 (age 34) Palma de Mallorca, Spain
- Height: 1.75 m (5 ft 9 in)

Gymnastics career
- Discipline: Men's artistic gymnastics
- Country represented: Spain
- Last updated on: 8 February 2019.

Fabián González (born 8 May 1992) is a Spanish artistic gymnast. He represented Spain at the 2012 Summer Olympics, finishing 9th in the individual all-around competition. In 2015, he announced that he was taking a break from competitive gymnastics for personal and health reasons.
