= Fabian Leimlehner =

Austrian artistic gymnast (born 1987)

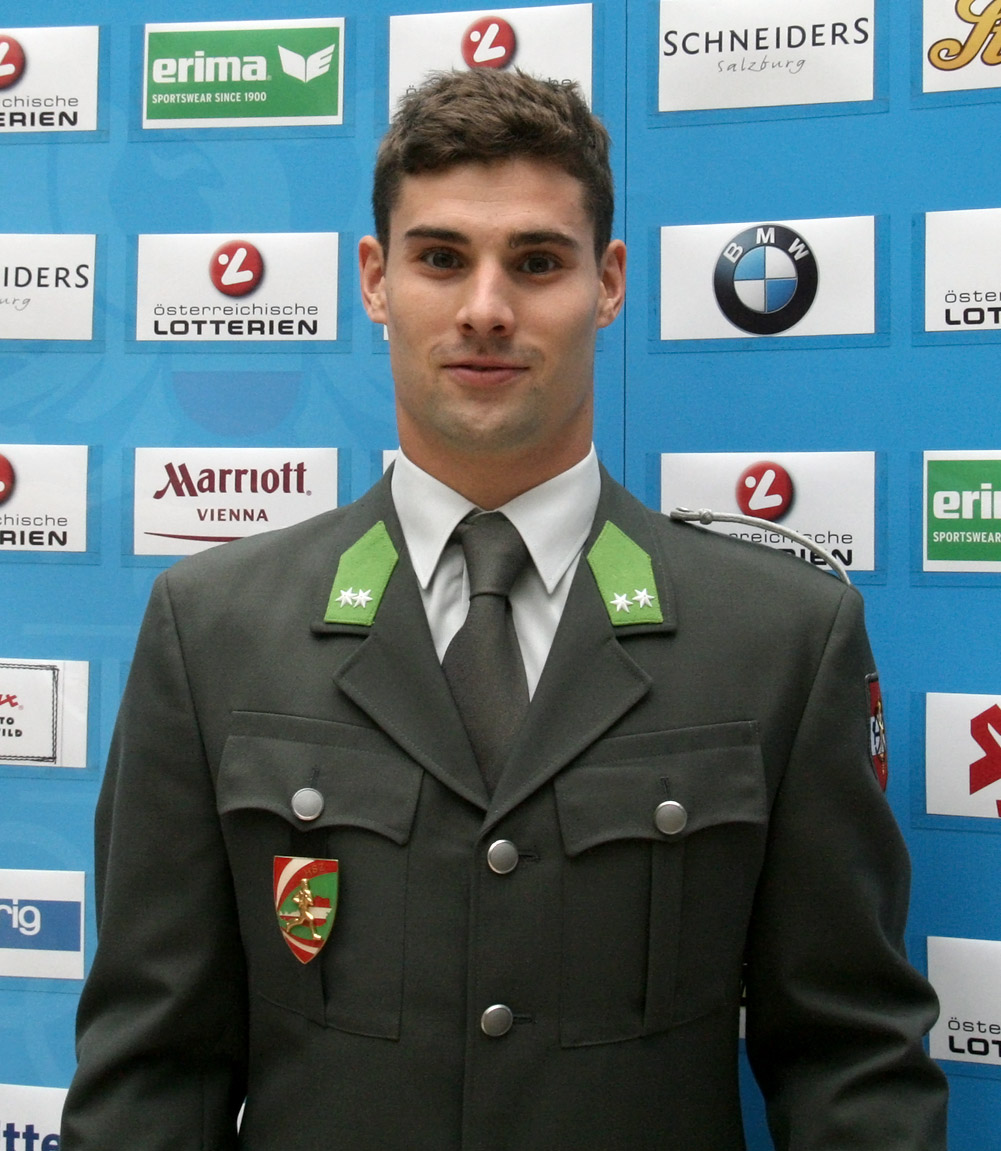
- Leimlehner in 2012

Personal information
- Born: 17 September 1987 (age 38) Liestal, Switzerland

Gymnastics career
- Discipline: Men's artistic gymnastics
- Country represented: Austria

Fabian Leimlehner (born 17 September 1987) is an Austrian male artistic gymnast and part of the national team. He participated at the 2012 Summer Olympics in London, United Kingdom. Leimlehner was part of the 2011 World Championships. In 2012 he competed at the European Artistic Gymnastics Team Championships. He also participated in the 2013, 2014, and 2015 World Championships.
