= Claudio Capelli =

Swiss artistic gymnast

- Born: 16 November 1986 (age 39) Bern, Switzerland

Gymnastics career
- Discipline: Men's artistic gymnastics
- Country represented: Switzerland (2015)

Claudio Capelli (born 16 November 1986, Bern) is a Swiss male artistic gymnast and part of the national team. He represented his country at the 2008 and 2012 Summer Olympics. He also participated at the 2015 World Artistic Gymnastics Championships in Glasgow. He now coaches the Swiss senior national men's gymnastics team.
