= Javier Gómez Fuertes =

Spanish gymnast

- Born: 5 December 1986 (age 39) Mataró, Spain
- Height: 1.62 m (5 ft 4 in)

Gymnastics career
- Discipline: Men's artistic gymnastics
- Country represented: Spain

Javier Gómez Fuertes (born 5 December 1986) is a Spanish gymnast. He finished 23rd in the all around at the 2012 Summer Olympics. He won the individual all-around competition at the Mediterranean Games in Mersin. He is 1.62 m tall and weighs 60 kg.
