= Felix Aronovich =

Israeli artistic gymnast

- 'פליקס אהרונוביץ
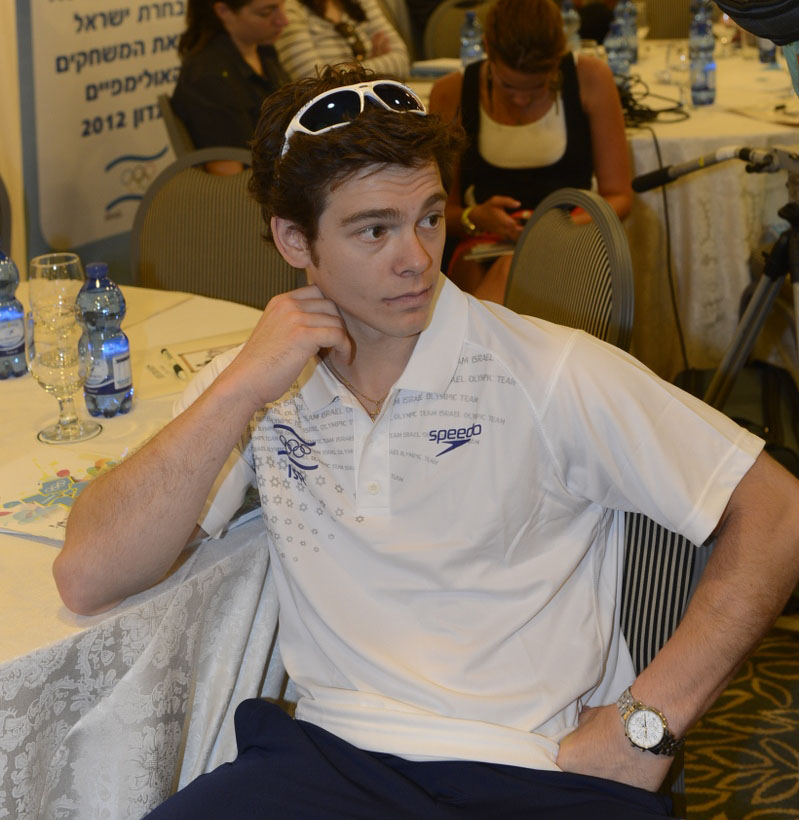
- Felix Aronovich at a consolidation event of the Olympic Committee of Israel in Eilat, 2012

Personal information
- Full name: Felix Aronovich
- Born: July 18, 1988 (age 38) Odesa, Ukraine
- Height: 168 cm (5.51 ft)

Gymnastics career
- Discipline: Men's artistic gymnastics
- Country represented: Israel
- College team: Penn State
- Club: Maccabi Tel Aviv
- Head coach: Sergei Vaisburg (Tel Aviv) Randy Jepson (Penn State)
- Assistant coach: Slava Boiko (Penn State) Kevin Tan (Penn State)

Felix Aronovich (Hebrew: פליקס אהרונוביץ') is an Israeli artistic gymnast who excels in floor exercise, pommel horse, still rings, vault and parallel bars.

== Early life ==
Aronovich was born on July 18, 1988, in Odesa, Ukraine to parents Leonid and Sofia. He has an older sister, Vicky. When he was 2-years-old, the family immigrated to Israel and settled in Kiryat Bialik. Aronovich attended ORT Kiryat Bialik, graduating in 2006. He majored in engineering science and intends to pursue a master's degree in the field of renewable energy at Penn State.

== Career ==
=== 2006 ===
He competed in his first competition at the 2006 World Artistic Gymnastics Championships and finished in the 113th place in the all-around.

=== 2009 ===
He finished third in the all-around at the 2009 Maccabiah Games.

=== 2010-11 ===
He competed at the 2010 World Artistic Gymnastics Championships but didn't not place well. He finished in 69th place on the pommel horse, 75th place on the rings, 81st place in the all-out, 109th place on the parallel bars, 131st place on the horizontal bar, 189th place in the floor exercise and the 238th place on the vault.

In 2010 he started training at Pennsylvania State University and made a tremendous impact as a freshman, developing into one of the team's strongest and most consistent performers by the end of the season. He was named Big Ten Co-Freshman of the Year, Penn State's first winner of the conference award since 1997 and won the "Big Ten Freshman of the Week" honors twice. He recorded Penn State's highest scores of the season in the pommel horse (15.100), parallel bars (14.850), and all-around (84.800).

In 2011 he was in the "Academic All-Big Ten" and was named "National Gymnast of the Week" after capturing two first-place finishes (parallel bars and all-around) and a third place (high bar) versus Ohio State. He set career highs in five events (floor exercise, pommel horse, still rings, vault, and parallel bars) and the all-around. Once again he recorded Penn State's highest scores of the season in the pommel horse (15.100), parallel bars (15.400), and the all-around (87.150) and was nationally ranked No. 10 (parallel bars), No. 14 (high bar), and No. 16 (still rings) at the end of the season.

=== 2012 ===
At the 2012 European Men's Artistic Gymnastics Championships he qualified for the all-around final in 11th place. This achievement allowed him to compete for Israel at the 2012 Summer Olympics after the Israeli Olympic Committee required him to fulfill extra criteria beyond the Olympic qualification process (finishing 12th or higher in the all-around at the European Championships or qualifying for an event final there) before they would send him to the Olympics. He also finished 38th place on the parallel bars, 39th place on the rings, 46th place on the horizontal bar, 52nd place in the floor exercise and the 80th place on the pommel horse.

At the 2012 Summer Olympics he finished 32nd place in the all-around qualifiers, 4 places short of qualifying for the final. He also finished 44th place on the pommel horse, 48th place on the parallel bars, 51st place on the rings and in the floor exercise, 56th place on the horizontal bar and the 68th place on the vault.

=== 2013 ===
In 2013, in college he earned All-America honors in the all-around and on the high bar, was named first team All-Big Ten, earned College Gymnastics Association All-America Scholar-Athlete honors (with a GPA over 3.70), and was named Academic All-Big Ten. He was named Big Ten Gymnast of the Week twice, earned College Gymnastics Association National Gymnast of the Week three times. He graduated from Penn Stated in 2013 with a Bachelor of Science in Engineering Science.

== See also ==
- Gymnastics in Israel
- List of Pennsylvania State University Olympians
