= Manuel Campos (gymnast) =

Portuguese gymnast (born 1981)

- Full name: Manuel Jorge Almeida Campos
- Born: 12 July 1981 (age 45) Porto, Portugal
- Height: 1.63 m (5 ft 4 in)

Gymnastics career
- Discipline: Men's artistic gymnastics
- Country represented: Portugal
- Club: Boavista F.C.

Manuel Jorge Almeida Campos (born 12 July 1981) is a Portuguese gymnast. He competed at the 2012 Summer Olympics.
