= Sergio Muñoz (gymnast) =

Spanish gymnast (born 1989)

Sergio Munoz
- Born: 30 August 1989 (age 37) Soria

Gymnastics career
- Discipline: Men's artistic gymnastics
- Country represented: Spain; (2011)

Sergio Munoz (born 30 August 1989 in Soria) is a Spanish male artistic gymnast and part of the national team. He participated at the 2008 Summer Olympics and 2012 Summer Olympics. He also competed at world championships, including the 2011 World Artistic Gymnastics Championships in Tokyo, Japan.
