= Flavius Koczi =

Romanian artistic gymnast

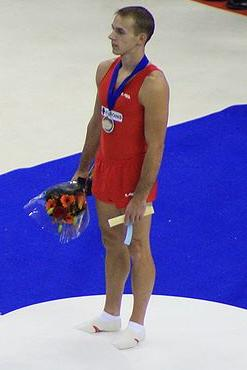

Personal information
- Born: 26 August 1987 (age 39) Reșița

Gymnastics career
- Discipline: Men's artistic gymnastics
- Country represented: Romania
- Club: CS Dinamo
- Head coach: Nicusor Pascu
- Former coach: Danuţ Grecu
Medal record
World Championships
Silver medal – second place	2009 London	Vault
European Championships
Gold medal – first place	2006 Volos	Pommel Horse
Gold medal – first place	2011 Berlin	Floor
Gold medal – first place	2012 Montpellier	Vault
Silver medal – second place	2006 Volos	Team
Silver medal – second place	2009 Milan	Vault
Silver medal – second place	2011 Berlin	All-around
Silver medal – second place	2013 Moscow	Vault
Bronze medal – third place	2007 Amsterdam	Pommel Horse
Bronze medal – third place	2008 Lausanne	Team
Bronze medal – third place	2010 Birmingham	Vault
Bronze medal – third place	2012 Montpellier	Team
Universiade
Gold medal – first place	2009 Belgrade	Vault
Gold medal – first place	2011 Shenzhen	Floor
Gold medal – first place	2011 Shenzhen	Vault
Bronze medal – third place	2009 Belgrade	Parallel Bars
Bronze medal – third place	2011 Shenzhen	Team
Bronze medal – third place	2011 Shenzhen	Pommel Horse

Flavius Koczi (born 26 August 1987 in Reșița, Romania) is a Romanian artistic gymnast. He is a world silver medalist on vault and a ten-time European medalist (all around, pommel horse, vault, floor, and team). Koczi is the 2006 European champion on pommel horse, the 2011 European Champion on floor, 2012 European Champion on Vault and was one of the vault, team, and all around finalists at the 2008 Olympic Games and finalist at the floor and vault at the 2012 Olympic Games.
