= Koji Yamamuro =

Japanese artistic gymnast

- Born: January 17, 1989 (age 37) Koga, Ibaraki
- Height: 159 cm (5 ft 3 in)

Gymnastics career
- Discipline: Men's artistic gymnastics
- Country represented: Japan
- Club: KONAMI
- Head coach: Hiroyuki Kato
- Assistant coaches: Yoghiaki Hatakeda, Koji Gushiken
- Former coach: Naoya Tsukahara
Medal record
Representing Japan
Olympic Games
| Gold medal – first place | 2016 Rio de Janeiro | Team |
| Silver medal – second place | 2012 London | Team |
World Championships
| Silver medal – second place | 2010 Rotterdam | Team |
| Silver medal – second place | 2011 Tokyo | Team |
| Bronze medal – third place | 2011 Tokyo | All-around |
| Bronze medal – third place | 2011 Tokyo | Rings |

Koji Yamamuro (山室 光史, Yamamuro Kōji; born January 17, 1989 in Koga, Ibaraki) is a Japanese gymnast. He has won two Olympic medals in the men's artistic team all-around – silver in 2012 (London) and gold in 2016 (Rio de Janeiro).

== Career ==
Yamamuro won the bronze medal in men's all-around at the 2011 World Championships.

Yamamuro competed for the national team at the 2012 Summer Olympics in the men's artistic team all-around. In the team final, he injured his ankle on the vault event and had to be helped off. Although he had qualified for the individual all-around final, he had to withdraw because of his injury and was replaced by his teammate Kazuhito Tanaka, who had ranked behind Yamamuro and Kōhei Uchimura and had not qualified due to the 2-per-country rule.

Yamamuro also participated in the 2012 American Cup.

At the 2016 Summer Olympics in Rio de Janeiro, Yamamuro won a gold medal as part of the Japanese men's team. In the event finals, Yamamuro competed on pommel horse and still rings with scores of 13.900 and 14.866 respectively.
