= 2005–2006 FIG Artistic Gymnastics World Cup series =

International gymnastics competition series

The 2005–2006 FIG Artistic Gymnastics World Cup series was a series of stages where events in men's and women's artistic gymnastics were contested. The series was a two-year long competition culminating at a final event, the World Cup Final in 2006. A number of qualifier stages were held. The top 3 gymnast in each apparatus at the qualifier events would receive medals and prize money. Gymnasts who finished in the top 8 would also receive points that would be added up to a ranking which would qualify individual gymnasts for the biennial World Cup Final.

== Stages ==
Year	Event	Location
2005	American Cup (World Cup qualifier)	New York City, United States
2005	World Cup qualifier	Cottbus, Germany
2005	World Cup qualifier	São Paulo, Brazil
2005	World Cup qualifier	Ghent, Belgium
2005	World Cup qualifier	Paris, France
2005	World Cup qualifier	Stuttgart, (Germany)
2005	World Cup qualifier	Glasgow, Scotland
2005	World Cup qualifier	Maribor, Slovenia
2006	World Cup qualifier (Men's only)	Tehran Iran
2006	World Cup qualifier	Lyon, France
2006	World Cup qualifier	Cottbus, (Germany)
2006	World Cup qualifier	Ghent, Belgium
2006	World Cup qualifier	Moscow, Russia
2006	World Cup qualifier	Maribor, Slovenia
2006	World Cup qualifier	Stuttgart, (Germany)
2006	World Cup qualifier	Glasgow, Scotland
2006	World Cup Final	São Paulo, Brazil

== Medalists ==
=== Men ===
Competition	Event	Gold	Silver	Bronze
New York (2005)	Floor exercise	(Netherlands) Jeffrey Wammes	(United States) Alexander Artemev	(Puerto Rico) Luis Rivera
New York (2005)	Pommel horse	(United States) Alexander Artemev	(Japan) Hisashi Mizutori	(Croatia) Robert Seligman
New York (2005)	Rings	(Netherlands) Yuri van Gelder	(Bulgaria) Yordan Yovchev	(United States) Eric La Morte
New York (2005)	Vault	(Netherlands) Jeffrey Wammes	(Philippines) Roel Ramirez	(Puerto Rico) Luis Rivera
New York (2005)	Parallel bars	(Japan) Kazuya Ueda	(Puerto Rico) Luis Vargas	(Spain) Manuel Carballo
New York (2005)	Horizontal bar	(France) Yann Cucherat	(Japan) Hisashi Mizutori (United States) Justin Spring	—N/a
Cottbus (2005)	Floor exercise	(Switzerland) Patrick Dominguez	(Netherlands) Jeffrey Wammes	(China) Zou Kai
Cottbus (2005)	Pommel horse	(Romania) Marius Urzică	(Italy) Alberto Busnari (United States) Alexander Artemev	—N/a
Cottbus (2005)	Rings	(Netherlands) Yuri van Gelder	(Kazakhstan) Ildar Valeyev	(Russia) Alexander Safoshkin
Cottbus (2005)	Vault	(China) Lu Bin	(Switzerland) Patrick Dominguez	(Hungary) Róbert Gál
Cottbus (2005)	Parallel bars	(Romania) Marius Urzică	(France) Johan Mounard	(Bulgaria) Andrey Lipinski
Cottbus (2005)	Horizontal bar	(Japan) Isao Yoneda	(Switzerland) Christoph Schärer (Russia) Sergey Khorokhordin	—N/a
São Paulo (2005)	Floor exercise	(Hungary) Róbert Gál	(Netherlands) Jeffrey Wammes	(Puerto Rico) Alexander Rodríguez
São Paulo (2005)	Pommel horse	(China) Dong Zhendong	(Hungary) Krisztián Berki	(Brazil) Mosiah Rodrigues
São Paulo (2005)	Rings	(China) Chen Yibing	(Netherlands) Yuri van Gelder	(Kazakhstan) Ildar Valeyev
São Paulo (2005)	Vault	(Hungary) Róbert Gál	(Germany) Matthias Fahrig	(Puerto Rico) Luis Rivera
São Paulo (2005)	Parallel bars	(Slovenia) Mitja Petkovšek	(China) Dong Zhendong	(Spain) Manuel Carballo
São Paulo (2005)	Horizontal bar	(Spain) Manuel Carballo	(Brazil) Mosiah Rodrigues	(Germany) Robert Juckel
Ghent (2005)	Floor exercise	(Canada) Brandon O'Neil	(Hungary) Róbert Gál	(Romania) Marian Drăgulescu
Ghent (2005)	Pommel horse	(Croatia) Robert Seligman	(Romania) Ioan Silviu Suciu	(Hungary) Krisztián Berki
Ghent (2005)	Rings	(Netherlands) Yuri van Gelder	(Bulgaria) Yordan Yovchev	(Kazakhstan) Timur Kurbanbayev
Ghent (2005)	Vault	(Romania) Răzvan Șelariu	(Switzerland) Patrick Dominguez	(Romania) Marian Drăgulescu
Ghent (2005)	Parallel bars	(Spain) Andreu Vivó	(Uzbekistan) Anton Fokin	(Kazakhstan) Yernar Yerimbetov
Ghent (2005)	Horizontal bar	(Kazakhstan) Yernar Yerimbetov	(Czech Republic) Martin Konečný	(Romania) Răzvan Șelariu
Paris (2005)	Floor exercise	(Romania) Marian Drăgulescu	(France) Dimitri Karbanenko	(Greece) Konstantinos Barmpakis
Paris (2005)	Pommel horse	(Romania) Marius Urzică	(France) Eric Casimir	(Hungary) Krisztián Berki
Paris (2005)	Rings	(Netherlands) Yuri van Gelder (Venezuela) Regulo Carmona	—N/a	(Italy) Matteo Morandi
Paris (2005)	Vault	(Romania) Marian Drăgulescu	(Kazakhstan) Yernar Yerimbetov	(Romania) Ilie Daniel Popescu
Paris (2005)	Parallel bars	(France) Johan Mounard	(Slovenia) Mitja Petkovšek	(Japan) Shun Kuwahara
Paris (2005)	Horizontal bar	(Italy) Igor Cassina	(Spain) Rafael Martínez	(Greece) Vlasios Maras
Stuttgart (2005)	Floor exercise	(Canada) Brandon O'Neil	(Switzerland) Patrick Dominguez	(Hungary) Róbert Gál
Stuttgart (2005)	Pommel horse	(Russia) Nikolai Kryukov	(China) Zhang Hongtao	(Spain) Víctor Cano
Stuttgart (2005)	Rings	(Russia) Alexander Safoshkin	(Netherlands) Yuri van Gelder	(Italy) Matteo Angioletti
Stuttgart (2005)	Vault	(Russia) Anatoly Vasilyev	(Romania) Alin Jivan	(Hungary) Róbert Gál
Stuttgart (2005)	Parallel bars	(Slovenia) Mitja Petkovšek	(China) Feng Zhe	(Greece) Vasileios Tsolakidis
Stuttgart (2005)	Horizontal bar	(Slovenia) Aljaž Pegan (Greece) Vlasios Maras	—N/a	(Switzerland) Christoph Schärer
Glasgow (2005)	Floor exercise	(Canada) Brandon O'Neill	(Netherlands) Jeffrey Wammes	(Hungary) Róbert Gál
Glasgow (2005)	Pommel horse	(Hungary) Krisztián Berki	(Romania) Marius Urzică	(United Kingdom) Louis Smith
Glasgow (2005)	Rings	(Netherlands) Yuri van Gelder	(Russia) Alexander Safoshkin	(Finland) Olli Torkkel
Glasgow (2005)	Vault	(Poland) Leszek Blanik	(China) Feng Zhe	(Hungary) Róbert Gál
Glasgow (2005)	Parallel bars	(China) Li Dezhi	(China) Feng Zhe	(Romania) Marius Urzică
Glasgow (2005)	Horizontal bar	(Australia) Philippe Rizzo	(Slovenia) Aljaž Pegan	(Russia) Anatoly Vasilyev
Maribor (2005)	Floor exercise	(Romania) Marian Drăgulescu	(Hungary) Róbert Gál	(Belarus) Denis Savenkov
Maribor (2005)	Pommel horse	(Hungary) Krisztián Berki	(Spain) Víctor Cano	(Puerto Rico) Luis Vargas
Maribor (2005)	Rings	(Netherlands) Yuri van Gelder	(Finland) Olli Torkkel	(Cyprus) Irodotos Georgallas
Maribor (2005)	Vault	(Romania) Marian Drăgulescu	(Bulgaria) Filip Yanev	(Romania) Alin Jivan
Maribor (2005)	Parallel bars	(Slovenia) Mitja Petkovšek	(Spain) Manuel Carballo	(Puerto Rico) Luis Vargas
Maribor (2005)	Horizontal bar	(Slovenia) Aljaž Pegan	(Switzerland) Christoph Schärer	(Spain) Manuel Carballo
Tehran (2006)	Floor exercise	(Netherlands) Jeffrey Wammes	(Armenia) Vahagn Stepanyan	(Croatia) Ivica Bago
Tehran (2006)	Pommel horse	(Armenia) Harutyun Merdinyan	(Uzbekistan) Anton Fokin	(Armenia) Vahagn Stepanyan
Tehran (2006)	Rings	(Netherlands) Yuri van Gelder	(Finland) Olli Torkkel	(Armenia) Vahagn Stepanyan
Tehran (2006)	Vault	(Netherlands) Jeffrey Wammes	(Jordan) Ali Al-Asi	(Austria) Marco Mayr
Tehran (2006)	Parallel bars	(Slovenia) Mitja Petkovšek	(Uzbekistan) Anton Fokin	(Armenia) Vahagn Stepanyan
Tehran (2006)	Horizontal bar	(Netherlands) Epke Zonderland	(Slovenia) Aljaž Pegan	(Austria) Marco Baldauf
Lyon (2006)	Floor exercise	(Romania) Marian Drăgulescu	(Brazil) Diego Hypólito	(China) Zou Kai
Lyon (2006)	Pommel horse	(Romania) Ilie Daniel Popescu	(Armenia) Harutyun Merdinyan	(Hungary) Krisztián Berki
Lyon (2006)	Rings	(Russia) Alexander Safoshkin	(China) Yang Wei	(Hungary) Krisztián Berki
Lyon (2006)	Vault	(Romania) Marian Drăgulescu	(Ukraine) Andriy Isayev	(Brazil) Diego Hypólito
Lyon (2006)	Parallel bars	(Slovenia) Mitja Petkovšek	(Russia) Sergey Khorokhordin	(France) Yann Cucherat
Lyon (2006)	Horizontal bar	(United States) Yewki Tomita	(China) Zou Kai	(Japan) Ryota Suzuki
Cottbus (2006)	Floor exercise	(Brazil) Diego Hypólito	(Canada) Brandon O'Neill	(Ukraine) Ievgenii Bogonosiuk
Cottbus (2006)	Pommel horse	(Hungary) Krisztián Berki	(Germany) Thomas Andergassen	(Canada) Ken Ikeda
Cottbus (2006)	Rings	(Netherlands) Yuri van Gelder	(Ukraine) Roman Zozulya	(China) Chen Yibing
Cottbus (2006)	Vault	(Canada) Brandon O'Neill	(Germany) Fabian Hambüchen	(Kazakhstan) Yernar Yerimbetov
Cottbus (2006)	Parallel bars	(Slovenia) Mitja Petkovšek	(China) Feng Zhe	(Greece) Vasileios Tsolakidis
Cottbus (2006)	Horizontal bar	(Greece) Vlasios Maras	(Germany) Fabian Hambüchen	(Japan) Hitoshi Aoyama (Japan) Kensuke Murata
Ghent (2006)	Floor exercise	(Ukraine) Ievgenii Bogonosiuk	(Russia) Anton Golotsutskov	(Croatia) Filip Ude
Ghent (2006)	Pommel horse	(China) Xiao Qin	(Hungary) Krisztián Berki	(Algeria) Sid Ali Ferdjani
Ghent (2006)	Rings	(Italy) Matteo Angioletti	(Cyprus) Irodotos Georgallas	(Egypt) Walid Said El-Dariny
Ghent (2006)	Vault	(Russia) Anton Golotsutskov	(Venezuela) Pablo Capote	(Spain) Isaac Botella
Ghent (2006)	Parallel bars	(China) Huang Xu	(Slovenia) Mitja Petkovšek	(Japan) Hiroyuki Tomita
Ghent (2006)	Horizontal bar	(Slovenia) Aljaž Pegan	(Ukraine) Ievgenii Bogonosiuk	(Belarus) Aliaksandr Tsarevich
Moscow (2006)	Floor exercise	(Croatia) Filip Ude	(Russia) Dmitry Gogotov	(Czech Republic) David Vyoral
Moscow (2006)	Pommel horse	(China) Zhang Hongtao	(Hungary) Krisztián Berki	(Ukraine) Mykola Kuksenkov
Moscow (2006)	Rings	(Russia) Alexander Safoshkin	(China) Chen Yibing	(China) Yan Mingyong
Moscow (2006)	Vault	(Russia) Anton Lobachev	(United States) Sean Golden	(Chile) Tomás González
Moscow (2006)	Parallel bars	(Slovenia) Mitja Petkovšek	(Ukraine) Roman Zozulya	(Ukraine) Andriy Isayev
Moscow (2006)	Horizontal bar	(Germany) Brian Gladow	(Ukraine) Mykola Kuksenkov	(Slovenia) Aljaž Pegan
Maribor (2006)	Floor exercise	(Croatia) Filip Ude	(Latvia) Ivans Gorbunovs	(Ukraine) Maksym Buryak
Maribor (2006)	Pommel horse	(Croatia) Robert Seligman	(Hungary) Krisztián Berki	(Latvia) Denis Zbickis
Maribor (2006)	Rings	(Venezuela) Regulo Carmona	(Ukraine) Oleksandr Vorobiov	(Cyprus) Irodotos Georgallas
Maribor (2006)	Vault	(Jordan) Jad Mazahreh	(Slovenia) Žiga Šilc	(Serbia) Miloš Paunović
Maribor (2006)	Parallel bars	(Slovakia) Samuel Piasecký	(Poland) Adam Kierzkowski	(Latvia) Denis Zbickis
Maribor (2006)	Horizontal bar	(Slovenia) Aljaž Pegan	(Greece) Vlasios Maras	(Switzerland) Christoph Schärer
Stuttgart (2006)	Floor exercise	(Germany) Fabian Hambüchen	(Canada) Brandon O'Neill	(Tunisia) Wajdi Bouallègue
Stuttgart (2006)	Pommel horse	(Hungary) Krisztián Berki	(Russia) Nikolai Kryukov	(United Kingdom) Louis Smith
Stuttgart (2006)	Rings	(Netherlands) Yuri van Gelder	(Venezuela) Regulo Carmona	(United States) Kai Wen Tan
Stuttgart (2006)	Vault	(Ukraine) Andriy Isayev	(France) Thomas Bouhail	(Romania) Ilie Daniel Popescu
Stuttgart (2006)	Parallel bars	(China) Li Xiaopeng	(Japan) Hiroyuki Tomita	(Russia) Nikolai Kryukov
Stuttgart (2006)	Horizontal bar	(Slovenia) Aljaž Pegan	(Japan) Eiichi Sekiguchi	(Switzerland) Christoph Schärer
Glasgow (2006)	Floor exercise	(Germany) Matthias Fahrig	(Tunisia) Wajdi Bouallègue	(France) Gaël Da Silva
Glasgow (2006)	Pommel horse	(United Kingdom) Louis Smith	(Hungary) Vid Hidvégi	(Croatia) Robert Seligman
Glasgow (2006)	Rings	(Russia) Alexander Safoshkin	(Ukraine) Oleksandr Vorobiov	(Finland) Olli Torkkel
Glasgow (2006)	Vault	(Germany) Matthias Fahrig	(Greece) Eleftherios Kosmidis	(Russia) Anton Golotsutskov
Glasgow (2006)	Parallel bars	(France) Yann Cucherat	(Poland) Roman Kulesza	(United States) Sean Townsend
Glasgow (2006)	Horizontal bar	(France) Yann Cucherat	(Netherlands) Epke Zonderland	(United Kingdom) David Eaton
São Paulo (2006 World Cup Final)	Floor exercise	(Brazil) Diego Hypólito	(Canada) Kyle Shewfelt	(Canada) Brandon O'Neill
São Paulo (2006 World Cup Final)	Pommel horse	(China) Xiao Qin	(Hungary) Krisztián Berki	(China) Teng Haibin
São Paulo (2006 World Cup Final)	Rings	(Venezuela) Regulo Carmona	(Ukraine) Oleksandr Vorobyov	(Italy) Matteo Angioletti
São Paulo (2006 World Cup Final)	Vault	(Romania) Marian Drăgulescu	(Russia) Anton Golotsutskov	(Brazil) Diego Hypólito
São Paulo (2006 World Cup Final)	Parallel bars	(China) Li Xiaopeng	(China) Huang Xu	(Ukraine) Valeriy Honcharov
São Paulo (2006 World Cup Final)	Horizontal bar	(Greece) Vlasios Maras	(Australia) Philippe Rizzo	(Slovenia) Aljaž Pegan

=== Women ===
Competition	Event	Gold	Silver	Bronze
New York (2005)	Vault	(United States) Alicia Sacramone	(United States) Melanie Sinclair	(China) Cheng Fei
New York (2005)	Uneven bars	(United States) Chellsie Memmel	(China) Liu Juan	(Spain) Tania Gener
New York (2005)	Balance beam	(China) Zhang Nan (United States) Nastia Liukin	—N/a	(United States) Chellsie Memmel
New York (2005)	Floor exercise	(Spain) Patricia Moreno	(United States) Alicia Sacramone	(United Kingdom) Beth Tweddle
Cottbus (2005)	Vault	(Brazil) Laís Souza	(Russia) Anna Pavlova	(China) Wang Tiantian
Cottbus (2005)	Uneven bars	(China) Fan Ye	(Russia) Yulia Lozhechko	(Spain) Tania Gener
Cottbus (2005)	Balance beam	(Russia) Yulia Lozhechko	(Russia) Anna Pavlova	(China) Fan Ye
Cottbus (2005)	Floor exercise	(Spain) Monica Mesalles	(Brazil) Laís Souza	(Switzerland) Linda Stämpfli
São Paulo (2005)	Vault	(Uzbekistan) Oksana Chusovitina	(Brazil) Laís Souza	(Spain) Tania Gener
São Paulo (2005)	Uneven bars	(China) Yufei Zhang	(Spain) Tania Gener	(Brazil) Camila Comin
São Paulo (2005)	Balance beam	(China) Lili Wang	(China) Pang Panpan	(Spain) Patricia Moreno
São Paulo (2005)	Floor exercise	(Brazil) Daiane dos Santos	(Spain) Patricia Moreno	(China) Xia Lin
Ghent (2005)	Vault	(United States) Alicia Sacramone	(United States) Anne Diluzio	(China) Cheng Fei
Ghent (2005)	Uneven bars	(United Kingdom) Beth Tweddle	(Spain) Laura Campos	(Czech Republic) Jana Šikulová
Ghent (2005)	Balance beam	(Romania) Cătălina Ponor	(Netherlands) Suzanne Harmes	(China) Zhang Nan
Ghent (2005)	Floor exercise	(United States) Alicia Sacramone	(Romania) Cătălina Ponor	(Netherlands) Suzanne Harmes
Paris (2005)	Vault	(United States) Alicia Sacramone	(Brazil) Laís Souza	(Belgium) Aagje Vanwalleghem
Paris (2005)	Uneven bars	(France) Émilie Le Pennec	(United Kingdom) Beth Tweddle	(Ukraine) Dariya Zgoba
Paris (2005)	Balance beam	(France) Marine Debauve	(Greece) Stefani Bismpikou	(Ukraine) Olga Sherbatykh
Paris (2005)	Floor exercise	(Brazil) Daiane dos Santos	(France) Isabelle Severino	(Brazil) Laís Souza
Stuttgart (2005)	Vault	(Brazil) Laís Souza	(Poland) Joanna Skowrońska	(Australia) Monette Russo
Stuttgart (2005)	Uneven bars	(China) Zhou Zhuoru	(China) Huang Lu	(Russia) Polina Miller
Stuttgart (2005)	Balance beam	(Romania) Cătălina Ponor	(China) Lili Wang	(France) Marine Debauve
Stuttgart (2005)	Floor exercise	(Brazil) Daiane dos Santos	(France) Katheleen Lindor	(United Kingdom) Imogen Cairns
Glasgow (2005)	Vault	(Uzbekistan) Oksana Chusovitina	(Australia) Monette Russo	(United Kingdom) Imogen Cairns
Glasgow (2005)	Uneven bars	(United Kingdom) Beth Tweddle	(China) Huang Lu	(Russia) Polina Miller
Glasgow (2005)	Balance beam	(China) Lili Wang	(China) Zhou Zhuoru	(United Kingdom) Beth Tweddle
Glasgow (2005)	Floor exercise	(United Kingdom) Beth Tweddle	(Ukraine) Alina Kozich	(United Kingdom) Imogen Cairns
Maribor (2005)	Vault	(Czech Republic) Jana Komrsková	(Canada) Alyssa Brown	(Austria) Sandra Mayer
Maribor (2005)	Uneven bars	(Czech Republic) Jana Šikulová	(Canada) Rebecca Simbhudas	(Netherlands) Suzanne Harmes
Maribor (2005)	Balance beam	(Romania) Cătălina Ponor	(Netherlands) Suzanne Harmes	(Romania) Alexandra Eremia
Maribor (2005)	Floor exercise	(Netherlands) Suzanne Harmes	(Croatia) Tina Erceg	(Romania) Florica Leonida
Lyon (2006)	Vault	(China) Cheng Fei	(Czech Republic) Jana Komrsková	(United States) Kassandra Price
Lyon (2006)	Uneven bars	(Czech Republic) Jana Šikulová	(United States) Kassandra Price	(United States) Ashley Priess
Lyon (2006)	Balance beam	(United States) Ashley Priess	(Switzerland) Ariella Käslin	(Romania) Sandra Izbașa
Lyon (2006)	Floor exercise	(China) Cheng Fei	(Romania) Sandra Izbașa	(Ukraine) Olga Sherbatykh
Cottbus (2006)	Vault	(United States) Jana Bieger	(Uzbekistan) Oksana Chusovitina	(Czech Republic) Jana Komrsková
Cottbus (2006)	Uneven bars	(China) Li Ya	(Russia) Irina Isayeva	(United States) Jana Bieger
Cottbus (2006)	Balance beam	(Russia) Irina Isayeva	(United States) Jana Bieger	(Brazil) Laís Souza
Cottbus (2006)	Floor exercise	(Russia) Irina Isayeva	(Spain) Lenika de Simone	(Brazil) Laís Souza
Ghent (2006)	Vault	(Uzbekistan) Oksana Chusovitina	(United States) Alicia Sacramone	(Poland) Joanna Skowrońska
Ghent (2006)	Uneven bars	(China) Li Ya	(Russia) Svetlana Klyukina	(Spain) Tania Gener
Ghent (2006)	Balance beam	(Spain) Lenika de Simone	(United States) Ashley Priess	(United States) Hillary Mauro
Ghent (2006)	Floor exercise	(Spain) Lenika de Simone	(Spain) Patricia Moreno	(United States) Ashley Priess
Moscow (2006)	Vault	(Uzbekistan) Oksana Chusovitina	(Czech Republic) Jana Komrsková	(Brazil) Laís Souza
Moscow (2006)	Uneven bars	(Czech Republic) Jana Šikulová	(Ukraine) Dariya Zgoba	(Russia) Yulia Lozhechko
Moscow (2006)	Balance beam	(Russia) Yulia Lozhechko	(Russia) Anna Pavlova	(Uzbekistan) Oksana Chusovitina
Moscow (2006)	Floor exercise	(Brazil) Daiane dos Santos	(Brazil) Laís Souza	(United States) Natasha Kelley
Maribor (2006)	Vault	(Czech Republic) Jana Komrsková	(Hungary) Laura Gombas	(Croatia) Tina Erceg
Maribor (2006)	Uneven bars	(Czech Republic) Jana Šikulová	(Croatia) Tina Erceg	(Greece) Stefani Bismpikou
Maribor (2006)	Balance beam	(Greece) Stefani Bismpikou	(Slovenia) Adela Šajn	(Czech Republic) Jana Komrsková
Maribor (2006)	Floor exercise	(Hungary) Laura Gombas	(Slovenia) Adela Šajn	(Greece) Stefani Bismpikou
Stuttgart (2006)	Vault	(Russia) Anna Pavlova	(Uzbekistan) Oksana Chusovitina	(Russia) Elena Zamolodchikova
Stuttgart (2006)	Uneven bars	(United States) Jana Bieger	(Russia) Polina Miller	(Uzbekistan) Oksana Chusovitina
Stuttgart (2006)	Balance beam	(Australia) Hollie Dykes	(Ukraine) Iryna Krasnianska	(Ukraine) Dariya Zgoba
Stuttgart (2006)	Floor exercise	(United States) Jana Bieger	(Australia) Daria Joura	(Russia) Anna Pavlova
Glasgow (2006)	Vault	(Russia) Anna Pavlova	(Russia) Elena Zamolodchikova	(Czech Republic) Jana Komrsková
Glasgow (2006)	Uneven bars	(United Kingdom) Beth Tweddle	(Ukraine) Dariya Zgoba	(Australia) Daria Joura
Glasgow (2006)	Balance beam	(Romania) Steliana Nistor	(Ukraine) Dariya Zgoba	(Russia) Anna Pavlova
Glasgow (2006)	Floor exercise	(Romania) Sandra Izbașa	(Russia) Elena Zamolodchikova	(Romania) Steliana Nistor
São Paulo (2006 World Cup Final)	Vault	(China) Cheng Fei	(Brazil) Laís Souza	(Russia) Elena Zamolodchikova
São Paulo (2006 World Cup Final)	Uneven bars	(United Kingdom) Beth Tweddle	(China) Li Ya	(Ukraine) Dariya Zgoba
São Paulo (2006 World Cup Final)	Balance beam	(China) Li Ya	(Brazil) Daniele Hypólito	(Spain) Lenika de Simone
São Paulo (2006 World Cup Final)	Floor exercise	(Brazil) Daiane dos Santos	(United Kingdom) Beth Tweddle	(Brazil) Laís Souza

== See also ==
- 2005–2006 FIG Rhythmic Gymnastics World Cup series
