= 2006 World Artistic Gymnastics Championships =

Gymnastics competition

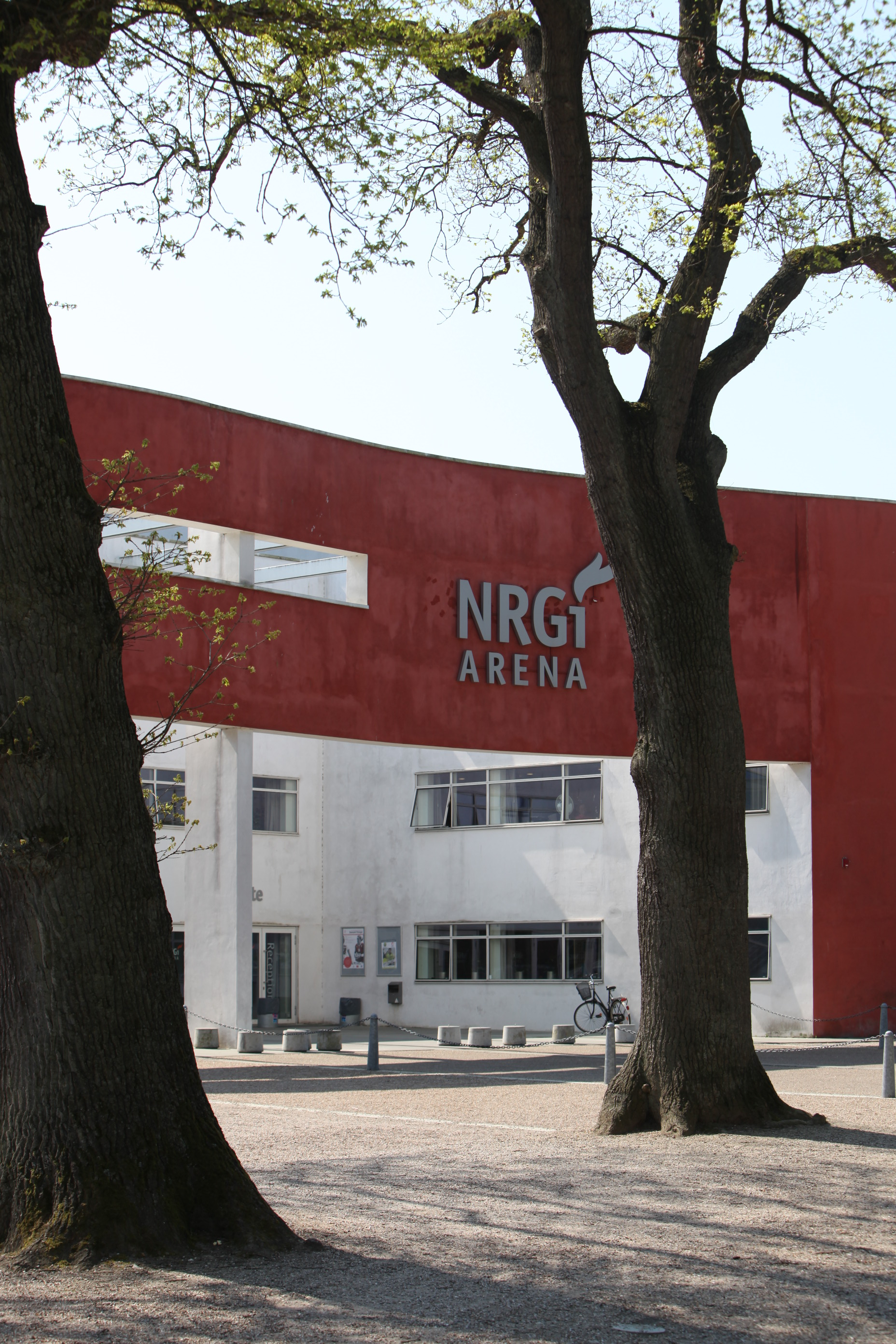
- NRGi Arena, where the competition was held.
- Venue: NRGi Arena
- Location: Aarhus, Denmark
- Start date: October 13, 2006
- End date: October 21, 2006

The 39th World Artistic Gymnastics Championships were held in Aarhus, Denmark, from October 13 to October 21, 2006.

The International Gymnastics Federation, which celebrated its 125th anniversary in 2006, introduced a new Code of Points at the World Championships, removing the "perfect 10" in favor of an open-ended code with separate scores for the difficulty and execution of a routine.

Vanessa Ferrari won the first female gold medal for Italy in the individual all-around.

== Results ==
| Event | Gold | Silver | Bronze |
|---|---|---|---|
Men
| Team all-around | China; Chen Yibing; Feng Jing; Liang Fuliang; Xiao Qin; Yang Wei; Zou Kai | Russia; Maxim Deviatovski; Dimitri Gogotov; Sergei Khorokhordin; Nikolai Kryukov; Yury Ryazanov; Alexander Safoshkin | Japan; Hisashi Mizutori; Takehito Mori; Takuya Nakase; Eichi Sekiguchi; Hiroyuki Tomita; Naoya Tsukahara |
| Individual all-around | Yang Wei (CHN) | Hiroyuki Tomita (JPN) | Fabian Hambüchen (GER) |
| Floor | Marian Drăgulescu (ROU) | Diego Hypólito (BRA) | Kyle Shewfelt (CAN) |
| Pommel horse | Xiao Qin (CHN) | Prashanth Sellathurai (AUS) | Alexander Artemev (USA) |
| Rings | Chen Yibing (CHN) | Yordan Yovchev (BUL) | Yuri van Gelder (NED) |
| Vault | Marian Drăgulescu (ROU) | Dmitry Kasperovich (BLR) | Fabian Hambüchen (GER) |
| Parallel bars | Yang Wei (CHN) | Hiroyuki Tomita (JPN); Yoo Won-chul (KOR) | none awarded |
| Horizontal bar | Philippe Rizzo (AUS) | Aljaž Pegan (SLO) | Vlasios Maras (GRE) |
Women
| Team all-around | China; Zhou Zhuoru; Zhang Nan; Cheng Fei; Pang Panpan; He Ning; Li Ya | United States; Jana Bieger; Chellsie Memmel; Alicia Sacramone; Nastia Liukin; Natasha Kelley; Ashley Priess | Russia; Anna Grudko; Svetlana Klyukina; Polina Miller; Anna Pavlova; Kristina Pravdina; Elena Zamolodchikova |
| Individual all-around | Vanessa Ferrari (ITA) | Jana Bieger (USA) | Sandra Izbașa (ROU) |
| Vault | Cheng Fei (CHN) | Alicia Sacramone (USA) | Oksana Chusovitina (GER) |
| Uneven bars | Beth Tweddle (GBR) | Nastia Liukin (USA) | Vanessa Ferrari (ITA) |
| Balance beam | Iryna Krasnianska (UKR) | Sandra Izbașa (ROU) | Elyse Hopfner-Hibbs (CAN) |
| Floor | Cheng Fei (CHN) | Jana Bieger (USA) | Vanessa Ferrari (ITA) |

== Men ==
=== Qualification ===
| Rank | Team | Floor (gymnastics) | Pommel horse | Rings (gymnastics) | Vault (gymnastics) | Parallel bars | Horizontal bar | Total |
|---|---|---|---|---|---|---|---|---|
| 1 | Hiroyuki Tomita (JPN) | 15.4 | 15.375 | 15.975 | 15.15 | 16 | 15.625 | 93.525 Q |
| 2 | Yang Wei (CHN) | 13.95 | 15.4 | 16.375 | 16.55 | 16.1 | 14.225 | 92.600 Q |
| 3 | Chen Yibing (CHN) | 15.025 | 14.925 | 16.525 | 16.375 | 15.075 | 14.55 | 92.475 Q |
| 4 | Feng Jing (CHN) | 14.9 | 15.5 | 15.1 | 15.85 | 15.525 | 14.85 | 91.725 |
| 5 | Fabian Hambüchen (GER) | 15.45 | 14.5 | 14.675 | 16.3 | 15.125 | 15.025 | 91.075 Q |
| 6 | Takuya Nakase (JPN) | 15.175 | 14.375 | 15.7 | 15.025 | 15.35 | 15.2 | 90.825 Q |
| 7 | Roman Zozulya (UKR) | 14.85 | 14.775 | 15.85 | 15.825 | 15.55 | 13.925 | 90.775 Q |
| 8 | Dan Potra (ROM) | 14.875 | 15.125 | 15.375 | 15.6 | 15.1 | 14.65 | 90.725 Q |
| 9 | Sergei Khorokhordin (RUS) | 14.95 | 14.7 | 14.9 | 15.65 | 15.45 | 14.6 | 90.250 Q |
| 10 | Rafael Martínez (ESP) | 15.15 | 15.075 | 14.65 | 15.35 | 15.05 | 14.875 | 90.150 Q |
| 11 | Adam Wong (CAN) | 15.225 | 14.575 | 14.85 | 15.7 | 15.1 | 14.675 | 90.125 Q |
| 12 | Flavius Koczi (ROM) | 15.4 | 15.7 | 13.6 | 15.9 | 14.825 | 14.525 | 89.950 Q |
| 13 | Maksim Devyatovskiy (RUS) | 13.85 | 14.225 | 15.125 | 16.2 | 15.5 | 15.05 | 89.950 Q |
| 14 | Hisashi Mizutori (JPN) | 13.275 | 14.675 | 15.125 | 15.725 | 15.675 | 15.35 | 89.825 |
| 15 | Mykola Kuksenkov (UKR) | 14.825 | 15.125 | 14.175 | 15.475 | 15.025 | 15.15 | 89.775 Q |
| 16 | Joshua Jefferis (AUS) | 14.975 | 14.125 | 15.025 | 15.55 | 15.25 | 14.75 | 89.675 Q |
| 17 | Yury Ryazanov (RUS) | 14.875 | 14 | 15.15 | 15.775 | 14.95 | 14.9 | 89.65 |
| 18 | Nathan Gafuik (CAN) | 15.1 | 14.575 | 14 | 16 | 14.925 | 15 | 89.600 Q |
| 19 | Yang Tae-Young (KOR) | 14.475 | 13.75 | 15.2 | 15.5 | 16.125 | 14.525 | 89.575 Q |
| 20 | Dimitri Karbanenko (FRA) | 15.25 | 14.55 | 14.375 | 16.025 | 14.225 | 15.05 | 89.475 Q |
| 21 | Andriy Isayev (UKR) | 14.925 | 14.3 | 15.05 | 15.9 | 14.975 | 14.125 | 89.275 |
| 22 | Christos Lympanovnos (GRE) | 14.95 | 14.45 | 15.125 | 15.55 | 15 | 14 | 89.075 Q |
| 23 | Claudio Capelli (SUI) | 15.3 | 14.55 | 13.875 | 16 | 14.875 | 14.4 | 89.000 Q |
| 24 | Luis Vargas (PUR) | 14.525 | 15.075 | 14.65 | 15.65 | 15.2 | 13.775 | 88.875 Q |
| 25 | Răzvan Șelariu (ROM) | 14.95 | 14.8 | 14.675 | 15.275 | 14.925 | 14.2 | 88.825 |
| 26 | Dimitri Savitski (BLR) | 14.875 | 14.35 | 14.125 | 15.75 | 15.025 | 14.675 | 88.800 Q |
| 27 | Guillermo Alvarez (USA) | 15.1 | 14.075 | 14.525 | 15.775 | 14.625 | 14.55 | 88.650 Q |
| 28 | Kim Dae-Eun (KOR) | 14.45 | 14.375 | 15.3 | 15.375 | 15.675 | 13.45 | 88.625 Q |
| 29 | Alexander Artemev (USA) | 14.525 | 15.45 | 14.45 | 15.55 | 14.975 | 13.675 | 88.625 Q |
| 30 | Eugen Spiridonov (GER) | 15.05 | 14.375 | 14.5 | 15.25 | 15.225 | 14.225 | 88.625 R |
| 31 | Andreas Schweizer (SUI) | 14.6 | 14.025 | 15.175 | 15.55 | 14.7 | 14.425 | 88.475 R |
| 32 | Philipp Boy (GER) | 14.325 | 14.8 | 14.45 | 15.5 | 14.525 | 14.875 | 88.475 |
| 33 | Ilie Daniel Popescu (ROM) | 14.75 | 14.575 | 14.65 | 16.375 | 14.85 | 13.125 | 88.325 |
| 34 | Vlasios Maras (GRE) | 14.4 | 14.3 | 13.175 | 15.7 | 14.85 | 15.85 | 88.275 R |
| 35 | Luis Rivera (PUR) | 15.125 | 14.9 | 14.475 | 15.725 | 13.575 | 14.45 | 88.250 R |
| 36 | Pavel Gofman (ISR) | 14.25 | 14.35 | 15 | 15.2 | 14.65 | 14.725 | 88.175 |
| 37 | Matteo Morandi (ITA) | 14.05 | 14.15 | 15.9 | 15.375 | 14.475 | 14.175 | 88.125 |
| 38 | Vahagn Stepanyan (ARM) | 14.375 | 14.5 | 15.2 | 15.2 | 14.775 | 13.525 | 87.575 |
| 39 | Kim Soo-Myun (KOR) | 14.7 | 14.625 | 13.475 | 15.575 | 14.725 | 14.375 | 87.475 |
| 40 | Paolo Ottavi (ITA) | 14.75 | 13.8 | 14.875 | 15.175 | 14.525 | 14.3 | 87.425 |
| 41 | Anton Fokin (UZB) | 13.725 | 13.075 | 14.45 | 15.525 | 15.8 | 14.65 | 87.225 |
| 42 | Filip Yanev (BUL) | 14.85 | 13.575 | 13.475 | 16.125 | 14.1 | 15.1 | 87.225 |
| 43 | Kim Seung-Il (KOR) | 14.475 | 13.525 | 13.825 | 15.225 | 14.7 | 15.45 | 87.2 |
| 44 | Samuel Offord (AUS) | 14.125 | 13.7 | 14.975 | 15.275 | 14.425 | 14.55 | 87.05 |
| 45 | Jorge Hugo Giraldo (COL) | 14.525 | 13.025 | 14.475 | 15.25 | 15.275 | 14.45 | 87 |
| 46 | Epke Zonderland (NED) | 13.775 | 13.975 | 14.575 | 15.775 | 15.1 | 13.675 | 86.875 |
| 47 | Huang Yi-Hsueh (TPE) | 14.3 | 14.25 | 14.15 | 16.525 | 14.125 | 13.475 | 86.825 |
| 48 | Ross Brewer (GBR) | 13.925 | 14.3 | 14.4 | 14.95 | 14.825 | 14.375 | 86.775 |
| 49 | Adam Cox (GBR) | 14.5 | 14.45 | 13.55 | 15.65 | 14.175 | 14.425 | 86.75 |
| 50 | Alexander Shatilov (ISR) | 15.65 | 13.95 | 13.575 | 15.575 | 14.025 | 13.875 | 86.65 |
| 51 | Victor Rosa (BRA) | 14.475 | 13.925 | 13.65 | 15.65 | 14.5 | 14.225 | 86.425 |
| 52 | Sergio Muñoz (ESP) | 14.6 | 13.225 | 14.225 | 15.8 | 14.225 | 14.2 | 86.275 |
| 53 | Ildar Valeyev (KAZ) | 14.225 | 12.95 | 14.75 | 15.35 | 14.675 | 14.15 | 86.1 |
| 54 | Konstantinos Barmpakis (GRE) | 15.225 | 12.725 | 13.825 | 15.8 | 14.45 | 13.95 | 85.975 |
| 55 | Danny Lawrence (GBR) | 13.525 | 14.025 | 14.4 | 15.55 | 14 | 14.325 | 85.825 |
| 56 | Alexander Rodríguez (PUR) | 13.575 | 14.6 | 12.825 | 15.675 | 14.5 | 14.475 | 85.65 |
| 57 | Jevgēņijs Saproņenko (LAT) | 14.175 | 13.65 | 13.55 | 16.35 | 14 | 13.825 | 85.55 |
| 58 | Daniel Corral (MEX) | 14.675 | 14.3 | 13.85 | 15.5 | 14.625 | 12.475 | 85.425 |
| 59 | Marcell Hetrovics (HUN) | 13.725 | 13.6 | 15 | 14.825 | 14.95 | 13.275 | 85.375 |
| 60 | Raphaël Wignanitz (FRA) | 14.6 | 13.225 | 14.275 | 15.8 | 12.95 | 14.475 | 85.325 |
| 61 | Stepan Gorbachev (KAZ) | 14.85 | 13.025 | 14.025 | 15.525 | 13.65 | 14.025 | 85.1 |
| 62 | Kamil Hulboj (POL) | 14.175 | 13.975 | 13.45 | 14.65 | 15.325 | 13.475 | 85.05 |
| 63 | Denis Zbickis (LAT) | 13.775 | 14.525 | 13.5 | 15.2 | 13.85 | 14.175 | 85.025 |
| 64 | Ümit Şamiloğlu (TUR) | 14.8 | 13.475 | 13.425 | 15.475 | 13.125 | 14.7 | 85 |
| 65 | Roman Kulesza (POL) | 13.85 | 13.325 | 12.925 | 15.525 | 15.225 | 14.025 | 84.875 |
| 66 | Filip Ude (CRO) | 13.775 | 14.125 | 13.85 | 15.525 | 13.3 | 14.125 | 84.7 |
| 67 | Sam Simpson (AUS) | 14.75 | 14.2 | 12.55 | 15.55 | 13.175 | 14.375 | 84.6 |
| 68 | Helge Vammen (DEN) | 13.875 | 14.325 | 13.2 | 15.65 | 13.65 | 13.825 | 84.525 |
| 69 | Jonathan Horton (USA) | 15.425 | 12.675 | 15.175 | 15.775 | 12.725 | 12.725 | 84.5 |
| 70 | Fernando Fuentes (VEN) | 13.95 | 13.475 | 13.3 | 15.725 | 14.05 | 13.925 | 84.425 |
| 71 | Jani Tanskanen (FIN) | 13.45 | 14.225 | 13.175 | 14.8 | 13.725 | 14.9 | 84.275 |
| 72 | Luis Sosa (MEX) | 13.875 | 13.825 | 13.975 | 15.3 | 13.175 | 14.075 | 84.225 |
| 73 | Samuel Piasecký (SVK) | 13.75 | 13.575 | 12.25 | 15.4 | 14.35 | 14.575 | 83.9 |
| 74 | Anthony van Assche (NED) | 14.125 | 14.15 | 13.975 | 14.7 | 13.275 | 13.625 | 83.85 |
| 75 | Herre Zonderland (NED) | 14.125 | 12.525 | 13.575 | 15.075 | 14.3 | 14.225 | 83.825 |
| 76 | Mark Holyoake (NZL) | 14.45 | 14.575 | 12.95 | 15.1 | 13.625 | 13.05 | 83.75 |
| 77 | Bjorn Slanvall (SWE) | 13.875 | 13.5 | 13.85 | 14.8 | 13.7 | 14 | 83.725 |
| 78 | Vid Hidvégi (HUN) | 13.975 | 15.175 | 13 | 13.95 | 14.05 | 13.55 | 83.7 |
| 79 | Riku Koivunen (FIN) | 13.7 | 14.4 | 13.875 | 13.65 | 14.15 | 13.85 | 83.625 |
| 80 | Jeppe Villekjaer (DEN) | 14.175 | 12.55 | 14.05 | 15.275 | 14.05 | 13.475 | 83.575 |
| 81 | Günther Couckhuyt (BEL) | 14.425 | 13.75 | 13.925 | 13.925 | 14.4 | 12.9 | 83.325 |
| 82 | Jimmy Boström (SWE) | 14.525 | 13.525 | 13.2 | 15.45 | 13.875 | 12.55 | 83.125 |
| 83 | Daniel Good (NZL) | 14.85 | 12.4 | 14.45 | 14.65 | 13.825 | 12.675 | 82.85 |
| 84 | Viktor Kristmannsson (ISL) | 14.1 | 13.725 | 13.175 | 14.6 | 13.9 | 12.7 | 82.2 |
| 85 | Marco Baldauf (AUT) | 13.675 | 13.325 | 13.4 | 14.575 | 13.625 | 13.55 | 82.15 |
| 86 | Mario Rauscher (AUT) | 14.225 | 13.425 | 13.075 | 14.5 | 13.175 | 13.65 | 82.05 |
| 87 | Sado Batsiyev (KAZ) | 13.525 | 13.375 | 12.1 | 15.325 | 14.3 | 13.375 | 82 |
| 88 | Xenofon Kosmidis (GRE) | 14.1 | 13.1 | 12.775 | 14.65 | 14.025 | 13.25 | 81.9 |
| 89 | Espen Jansen (NOR) | 13.05 | 12.925 | 13.875 | 14.725 | 13.475 | 13.8 | 81.85 |
| 90 | Carlos Carbonell (VEN) | 13 | 13.275 | 13.55 | 15.425 | 13.925 | 12.625 | 81.8 |
| 91 | Cristian Brezeanu (RSA) | 13.1 | 13.175 | 13.875 | 15.5 | 13.4 | 12.725 | 81.775 |
| 92 | Arve Jorgensen (NOR) | 13.9 | 13.4 | 13.85 | 14.575 | 13 | 12.975 | 81.7 |
| 93 | Pedro Almeida (POR) | 14.5 | 13.2 | 11.575 | 14.95 | 13.5 | 13.925 | 81.65 |
| 94 | Huang Tai-I (TPE) | 12.8 | 13.425 | 14.1 | 14.3 | 14.025 | 12.925 | 81.575 |
| 95 | Karim Aly Mohamed (EGY) | 13.725 | 13.15 | 12.85 | 15.45 | 13.425 | 12.95 | 81.55 |
| 96 | Walid Said Eldariny (EGY) | 11.85 | 13.5 | 15.475 | 13.525 | 14.1 | 12.975 | 81.425 |
| 97 | Troy Sender (RSA) | 12.8 | 13.6 | 13.45 | 14.325 | 13.95 | 13.275 | 81.4 |
| 98 | Sergio Restrepo (COL) | 13.625 | 13.525 | 12.35 | 13.675 | 14.4 | 13.775 | 81.35 |
| 99 | Constantinos Aristotelous (CYP) | 13.3 | 13.05 | 12.675 | 14.475 | 13.95 | 13.825 | 81.275 |
| 100 | Eduard Gholub (ISR) | 13.775 | 11.3 | 14.225 | 14.75 | 13.45 | 13.575 | 81.075 |
| 101 | Mohamed Serour (EGY) | 13.4 | 12.725 | 13.975 | 16.5 | 12.95 | 11.325 | 80.875 |
| 102 | Johnny Parra (VEN) | 13.625 | 13.3 | 11.35 | 15.225 | 14.05 | 13.25 | 80.8 |
| 103 | Sascha Palgen (LUX) | 12.775 | 14.25 | 13.275 | 13.925 | 14.475 | 12.1 | 80.8 |
| 104 | Michal Boltnar (CZE) | 13.975 | 11.2 | 13.55 | 14.55 | 13.85 | 13.575 | 80.7 |
| 105 | Evgeni Zorins (LAT) | 13.225 | 10.275 | 13.675 | 14.75 | 14.15 | 14.4 | 80.475 |
| 106 | Sebastian Straus (SLO) | 13.475 | 12.775 | 13.55 | 14.725 | 14.05 | 11.9 | 80.475 |
| 107 | Manuel Aleman (MEX) | 12.775 | 11.825 | 14.7 | 14.2 | 14.15 | 12.725 | 80.375 |
| 108 | Martin Vlk (CZE) | 14.05 | 13.225 | 13.075 | 14.25 | 13.575 | 12.125 | 80.3 |
| 109 | Sami Aalto (FIN) | 13.025 | 12.775 | 12.25 | 14.85 | 13.5 | 13.9 | 80.3 |
| 110 | Runar Alexandersson (ISL) | 13.05 | 11.1 | 14.35 | 14.5 | 13.925 | 13.15 | 80.075 |
| 111 | Chang Che-Wei (TPE) | 13.25 | 12.6 | 13.375 | 13.6 | 13.95 | 13.3 | 80.075 |
| 112 | Tamer Ragab (EGY) | 13.05 | 13.975 | 12 | 14.65 | 12.825 | 13.475 | 79.975 |
| 113 | Felix Aronovich (ISR) | 12.6 | 13.075 | 12.725 | 14.35 | 13.95 | 13.275 | 79.975 |
| 114 | Klemen Rutar (SLO) | 13.15 | 12.6 | 12.475 | 14.55 | 13.85 | 13.3 | 79.925 |
| 115 | Petr Smejkal (CZE) | 13.675 | 10.5 | 13.55 | 14.65 | 13.65 | 13.725 | 79.75 |
| 116 | Tyrone Morris (RSA) | 13 | 13.325 | 12.575 | 14.2 | 13.65 | 12.975 | 79.725 |
| 117 | Florin Purge (DEN) | 12.85 | 13.35 | 14 | 13.65 | 12.225 | 13.6 | 79.675 |
| 118 | Jevgenij Izmodenov (LTU) | 13.6 | 13.7 | 12.675 | 14.325 | 12.175 | 13.15 | 79.625 |
| 119 | Joachim Hanche Olsen (NOR) | 11.675 | 12.95 | 13.1 | 14.425 | 13.625 | 13.625 | 79.4 |
| 120 | Sukdee Thitipong (THA) | 13.525 | 14.525 | 13.975 | 13.425 | 13.425 | 10.225 | 79.1 |
| 121 | George Foo (SWE) | 12.65 | 11.475 | 13.825 | 14.625 | 13.7 | 12.425 | 78.7 |
| 122 | Fabian Leimlehner (AUT) | 14.05 | 13.05 | 13.45 | 14.1 | 13.375 | 10 | 78.025 |
| 123 | Maximilian Fingerhuth (CHI) | 13.05 | 10.875 | 12.825 | 15.4 | 12.9 | 12.45 | 77.5 |
| 124 | Kaewpanya Rartchawat (THA) | 12.525 | 12.7 | 12.25 | 15.15 | 13.475 | 10.95 | 77.05 |
| 125 | Nikolai Kryukov (RUS) | 14.475 | 15.675 | | 16.275 | 15.15 | 15.475 | 77.05 |
| 126 | Manuel Pasten (CHI) | 13.5 | 10.925 | 12.175 | 14.825 | 12.375 | 12.825 | 76.625 |
| 127 | Yordan Yovchev (BUL) | 15.45 | | 16.25 | 15.75 | 14.6 | 14.45 | 76.5 |
| 128 | Oussama Lafri (ALG) | 13.075 | 13.625 | 12.7 | 14.175 | 11.875 | 11 | 76.45 |
| 129 | Robert Kristmannsson (ISL) | 12.425 | 11.5 | 12.875 | 14.775 | 12.625 | 12.225 | 76.425 |
| 130 | Islam Shahin (EGY) | 13 | 13.9 | 12.325 | 13.75 | 12.9 | 10.075 | 75.95 |
| 131 | Dimitri Kaspiarovich (BLR) | 14.75 | | 15.375 | 16.55 | 14.925 | 14.325 | 75.925 |
| 132 | Bjarki Asgeirsson (ISL) | 11.7 | 13.45 | 12.9 | 13.675 | 12.775 | 11.225 | 75.725 |
| 133 | Nicolas Boeschenstein (SUI) | 15.175 | | 14.6 | 16.125 | 15.35 | 14.2 | 75.45 |
| 134 | Liang Fuliang (CHN) | 15.25 | 13.875 | 14.925 | 16.125 | 15.175 | | 75.35 |
| 135 | Gaël Da Silva (FRA) | 15.45 | | 14.725 | 15.6 | 15.15 | 14.05 | 74.975 |
| 136 | David Sender (USA) | 15.225 | | 14.9 | 16.05 | 14.275 | 14.3 | 74.75 |
| 137 | Robert Juckel (GER) | 13.85 | 15.25 | 14.575 | 15.55 | | 15.125 | 74.35 |
| 138 | Emilio Cubillos (CHI) | 12.65 | 10.675 | 10.775 | 14.225 | 13.05 | 12.875 | 74.25 |
| 139 | David Kikuchi (CAN) | 14.1 | 14.575 | 15.575 | | 15.325 | 14.625 | 74.2 |
| 140 | Diego Hypólito (BRA) | 16.025 | 13.5 | 13.925 | 16.3 | 14.375 | | 74.125 |
| 141 | José Luis Fuentes (VEN) | | 15.1 | 14.125 | 15.525 | 15 | 14.275 | 74.025 |
| 142 | Daniel Groves (SUI) | 14.6 | 14.575 | | 14.875 | 14.7 | 15.225 | 73.975 |
| 143 | Ivan San Miguel (ESP) | | 13.95 | 15.475 | 16.15 | 13.825 | 14.425 | 73.825 |
| 144 | Juan Pablo González (CHI) | 11.825 | 10.45 | 11.4 | 15.45 | 12.4 | 12.25 | 73.775 |
| 145 | Yann Rayepin (FRA) | 14.875 | 14.025 | 14.025 | 16.4 | | 14.425 | 73.75 |
| 146 | Matas Macaitis (LTU) | 12.075 | 9.9 | 12.9 | 13.45 | 12.675 | 12.1 | 73.1 |
| 147 | Yernar Yerimbetov (KAZ) | | 13.725 | 13.975 | 16.15 | 14.425 | 14.825 | 73.1 |
| 148 | Enzo Bernardoni (ITA) | 14.45 | 13.525 | | 15.875 | 14.525 | 14.675 | 73.05 |
| 149 | Gustavo Simoes (POR) | 14.5 | 14.1 | 14.725 | 15.375 | 14.2 | | 72.9 |
| 150 | Denis Savenkov (BLR) | 14.8 | 13.525 | | 15.725 | 14.3 | 14.525 | 72.875 |
| 151 | Víctor Cano (ESP) | 13.975 | 15.275 | 14.125 | | 14.425 | 14.925 | 72.725 |
| 152 | Vitali Nakonechny (UKR) | 15.15 | 14.775 | 13.6 | 15.35 | | 13.825 | 72.7 |
| 153 | Mosiah Rodrigues (BRA) | 13.775 | 13.875 | | 15.65 | 14.425 | 14.975 | 72.7 |
| 154 | Michel Conceição (BRA) | 15.075 | | 14.2 | 15.75 | 13.8 | 13.5 | 72.325 |
| 155 | Sam Hunter (GBR) | 15.025 | 13.825 | | 15.125 | 13.6 | 14.425 | 72 |
| 156 | Thomas Pichler (AUS) | 15.15 | 13 | 13.825 | 15.5 | | 14.425 | 71.9 |
| 157 | Luis Araújo (POR) | 14.475 | | 13.8 | 15.775 | 13.625 | 13.55 | 71.225 |
| 158 | Ivan Gorbunovs (LAT) | 14.25 | 14.25 | 14 | 14.55 | 14.15 | | 71.2 |
| 159 | Filipe Bezugo (POR) | 14.475 | 14.5 | 14.15 | | 14.65 | 13.3 | 71.075 |
| 160 | Luke Carson (IRL) | 12.2 | 10.175 | 10.55 | 13.875 | 12.55 | 11.35 | 70.7 |
| 161 | Levente Fekete (HUN) | | 14.125 | 14.85 | 13.975 | 14.25 | 13.2 | 70.4 |
| 162 | Ken Ikeda (CAN) | | 15.05 | 10.8 | 15.575 | 15.475 | 13 | 69.9 |
| 163 | Marek Lyszczarz (POL) | 13.6 | 13.55 | 14.65 | 15.55 | | 12.525 | 69.875 |
| 164 | Igor Cassina (ITA) | | 12.35 | 14.225 | 15.175 | 14.45 | 13.5 | 69.7 |
| 165 | Przemysław Lis (POL) | 13.475 | 12.55 | | 15.525 | 14.3 | 13.45 | 69.3 |
| 166 | Aleksandar Batinkov (BUL) | 14.125 | | 11.95 | 15.4 | 13.875 | 13.475 | 68.825 |
| 167 | Ángel Ramos (PUR) | 14.35 | 13.5 | | 15.7 | 10.375 | 14.8 | 68.725 |
| 168 | Henrik Kraemmer (DEN) | 13.775 | 13.35 | | 14.8 | 12.575 | 13.9 | 68.4 |
| 169 | Bogomil Kuyumdzhiev (BUL) | 14 | 13.25 | 14.15 | 14.175 | 12.675 | | 68.25 |
| 170 | Csaba Horváth (HUN) | 13.15 | 13.8 | 13 | 14.725 | | 13.4 | 68.075 |
| 171 | Timo Niemelä (FIN) | 13.6 | | 13.45 | 14.9 | 13.6 | 12.375 | 67.925 |
| 172 | Bernardo Graça (POR) | | 13.625 | 13.4 | 14.25 | 14.175 | 12.45 | 67.9 |
| 173 | Jeroen Hardon (NED) | 13.45 | 12.625 | | 15.575 | 13.45 | 12.725 | 67.825 |
| 174 | Ibrahim Bulut (TUR) | 14.3 | 13.525 | | 14.7 | 13.175 | 12.025 | 67.725 |
| 175 | Abdelkader Guettaf (ALG) | 12.8 | | 14.95 | 14.675 | 12.1 | 12.95 | 67.475 |
| 176 | Caio Costa (BRA) | 14.05 | 13.875 | 12.8 | 14 | | 12.725 | 67.45 |
| 177 | Cumhur Zorba (TUR) | 13.45 | 12.35 | 13.25 | 15.075 | | 12.725 | 66.85 |
| 178 | Sid Ali Ferdjani (ALG) | | 14.3 | 11.9 | 13.6 | 12.9 | 13.975 | 66.675 |
| 179 | Teymur Shahlamazov (AZE) | 12.35 | 11.375 | 10.875 | 12.95 | 9.975 | 8.975 | 66.5 |
| 180 | Ross Ferguson (RSA) | 13.9 | | 12.825 | 14.75 | 13.525 | 11.425 | 66.425 |
| 181 | Ilkka Kuusela (FIN) | 12.275 | 13.875 | 12.75 | 13.65 | 13.7 | | 66.25 |
| 182 | Karim Guezgouz (ALG) | 13.05 | 12.05 | 12.925 | 15.325 | | 12.825 | 66.175 |
| 183 | Kerem Venedik (TUR) | 13.7 | 13.325 | 13.125 | | 12.6 | 13.15 | 65.9 |
| 184 | Huang Che-Kuei (TPE) | 12.675 | 14.45 | 10.85 | 13.625 | | 14.225 | 65.825 |
| 185 | Fatih Yıldız (TUR) | 13.25 | | 12.775 | 14.65 | 13.1 | 12.025 | 65.8 |
| 186 | Ziga Britovsek (SLO) | 13.175 | 12.875 | 12.3 | 14.525 | 12.575 | | 65.45 |
| 187 | Yousef Sebti (ALG) | 10.325 | 13.275 | | 14.525 | 12.675 | 14.275 | 65.075 |
| 188 | Martin Růžička (CZE) | 14 | 11.9 | | 13.975 | 12.175 | 12.4 | 64.45 |
| 189 | Werner Grobler (RSA) | 13.25 | 12.6 | | 13.95 | 11.6 | 12.975 | 64.375 |
| 190 | Marian Drăgulescu (ROM) | 16.25 | | 16.2 | | 15.025 | 15.5 | 62.975 |
| 191 | Takehito Mori (JPN) | | 14.85 | | 16.075 | 15.7 | 15.45 | 62.075 |
| 192 | Ivan Ivankov (BLR) | | 14.575 | 16.25 | | 15.775 | 15.4 | 62 |
| 193 | Xiao Qin (CHN) | | 16.175 | | 15.775 | 15.675 | 14.25 | 61.875 |
| 194 | Yoo Won-Chul (KOR) | 14.275 | | 15.125 | 15.75 | 15.75 | | 60.9 |
| 195 | Isaac Botella Pérez (ESP) | 15.525 | 13.875 | 15.125 | 15.85 | | | 60.375 |
| 196 | Dimitri Gogotov (RUS) | 15.225 | 14.2 | | 15.75 | | 14.95 | 60.125 |
| 197 | Kyle Shewfelt (CAN) | 15.475 | | 13.95 | 15.75 | | 14.8 | 59.975 |
| 198 | Thomas Bouhail (FRA) | 15.275 | 14.55 | | 16.475 | 13.525 | | 59.825 |
| 199 | Marcel Nguyen (GER) | 14.075 | | | 15.75 | 15.375 | 14.425 | 59.625 |
| 200 | Gervasio Deferr (ESP) | 15.75 | | | 15.4 | 14.525 | 13.925 | 59.6 |
| 201 | Yann Cucherat (FRA) | | 14.45 | 14.55 | | 15.325 | 15.25 | 59.575 |
| 202 | Naoya Tsukahara (JPN) | 14.9 | 13.6 | 15.375 | | 15.675 | | 59.55 |
| 203 | Mark Ramseier (SUI) | | 14.525 | 14.775 | 16 | 14 | | 59.3 |
| 204 | Manuel Campos (POR) | 14.825 | 14.725 | | 15.175 | | 14.5 | 59.225 |
| 205 | Aliaksandr Tsarevich (BLR) | 14.2 | 14.675 | | | 15.225 | 14.925 | 59.025 |
| 206 | Matteo Angioletti (ITA) | 13.65 | | 16.1 | 15.85 | | 13.35 | 58.95 |
| 207 | Oleksandr Yakubovsky (UKR) | 15.4 | | | 15.15 | 13.575 | 14.6 | 58.725 |
| 208 | Roger Sager (SUI) | 14.6 | 14.3 | 14.85 | | | 14.825 | 58.575 |
| 209 | Luke Folwell (GBR) | 14.175 | 14.05 | 14.225 | 15.55 | | | 58 |
| 210 | István Szalontai (HUN) | 14.325 | | | 15.7 | 14.25 | 13.7 | 57.975 |
| 211 | Santiago López (MEX) | 14.6 | | 13.55 | 15.65 | 14.125 | | 57.925 |
| 212 | Andrea Coppolino (ITA) | 14.025 | 13.75 | 16.225 | | 13.65 | | 57.65 |
| 213 | Jeffrey Wammes (NED) | | 13.15 | 14.35 | | 14.575 | 15.35 | 57.425 |
| 214 | Vasileios Tsolakidis (GRE) | 14.325 | 12.15 | | 15.075 | 15.775 | | 57.325 |
| 215 | Kai Wen Tan (USA) | | 14.075 | 13.175 | | 15.325 | 14.6 | 57.175 |
| 216 | Tommy Ramos (PUR) | | 13.475 | 14.95 | 0 | 14.15 | 14.525 | 57.1 |
| 217 | Eiichi Sekiguchi (JPN) | 14.175 | | 14.65 | 13.975 | | 14.1 | 56.9 |
| 218 | Luiz Dos Anjos (BRA) | | 13.05 | 14.325 | | 14.025 | 14.725 | 56.125 |
| 219 | Dimitri Trefilovs (LAT) | 13.575 | 13.775 | | | 14.5 | 14.225 | 56.075 |
| 220 | Maxim Petrishko (KAZ) | 13.9 | 14.8 | | | 14.425 | 12.925 | 56.05 |
| 221 | Joaquín Ramírez (MEX) | 14.65 | 12.95 | | 15.475 | | 12.45 | 55.525 |
| 222 | Tore Samuelsen (NOR) | 13.5 | | 14.65 | 14.575 | | 12.575 | 55.3 |
| 223 | Aleksandar Markov (BUL) | | 13.675 | 13.8 | | 14.025 | 13.35 | 54.85 |
| 224 | Ivan Tovar (VEN) | 12.875 | 13.425 | | | 14.5 | 13.85 | 54.65 |
| 225 | Miguel Monreal (MEX) | | 13.775 | 13.625 | | 12.95 | 14.175 | 54.525 |
| 226 | Krzysztof Muchorski (POL) | | 12.6 | 14.875 | | 14.3 | 12.7 | 54.475 |
| 227 | Daniel Larsen (NOR) | 13.425 | 12.4 | | 14.7 | 13.45 | | 53.975 |
| 228 | Sébastian Boesch (AUT) | 13.225 | | 12.85 | 14.725 | | 13.15 | 53.95 |
| 229 | Gabriel Rossi (AUT) | 13.65 | 13.275 | | | 13.175 | 13.4 | 53.5 |
| 230 | Uladzimir Yermakov (BLR) | 12.95 | 11.25 | 14.4 | 14.775 | | | 53.375 |
| 231 | Mans Stenberg (SWE) | 13.9 | | 12.475 | 14.45 | | 12.525 | 53.35 |
| 232 | Elof Tehler (SWE) | | 11.775 | | 15.3 | 12.975 | 13.075 | 53.125 |
| 233 | Ersin Şafak (TUR) | | 13.35 | 12.6 | 14.725 | 12.425 | | 53.1 |
| 234 | Fatah Ait Saada (ALG) | 13.6 | 13 | 13.625 | | 12.85 | | 53.075 |
| 235 | Alen Dimic (SLO) | | 14.25 | 12.625 | | 11.2 | 14.75 | 52.825 |
| 236 | Patrik Hagelin (SWE) | 13.025 | 12.825 | 13.325 | | 13.175 | | 52.35 |
| 237 | Blaz Puljic (SLO) | | 12.95 | 12.675 | 14.425 | 12.2 | | 52.25 |
| 238 | Daniel Rexa (CZE) | | 13.825 | 13.475 | | 11.35 | 12.6 | 51.25 |
| 239 | Andreas Höller (AUT) | | 11.8 | 10.8 | 14.875 | 13.2 | | 50.675 |
| 240 | Clayton Strother (USA) | 15.275 | 14.875 | | 15.625 | | | 45.775 |
| 241 | Thomas Andergassen (GER) | | 15.125 | 15.425 | | 15.05 | | 45.6 |
| 242 | Brandon O'Neill (CAN) | 15.45 | | | 16.2 | 13.9 | | 45.55 |
| 243 | Prashanth Sellathurai (AUS) | | 15.7 | 15.675 | | 13.825 | | 45.2 |
| 244 | Regulo Carmona (VEN) | 13.425 | | 16.075 | 15.65 | | | 45.15 |
| 245 | Philippe Rizzo (AUS) | 14.075 | | | 0 | 14.975 | 15.875 | 44.925 |
| 246 | Sain Autalipov (KAZ) | 14.15 | | 14.275 | 16.025 | | | 44.45 |
| 247 | Leszek Blanik (POL) | 14.225 | | 13.875 | 16.25 | | | 44.35 |
| 248 | Igors Vihrovs (LAT) | | | 14.2 | 15.65 | | 14.4 | 44.25 |
| 249 | Róbert Gál (HUN) | | 14.15 | 14.375 | | 14.5 | | 43.025 |
| 250 | Huang Sheng-Meng (TPE) | | | 14.8 | 14.75 | 13.15 | | 42.7 |
| 251 | David Vyoral (CZE) | 13.475 | | 13.5 | 15.575 | | | 42.55 |
| 252 | Nashwan Al-Harazi (YEM) | 14.05 | 12.9 | | 15.125 | | | 42.075 |
| 253 | Oleksandr Suprun (UKR) | | 14.525 | 14.2 | | 13.225 | | 41.95 |
| 254 | Oliver Kneen (GBR) | | | 13.95 | | 13.4 | 13.65 | 41 |
| 255 | Kristian Solem (NOR) | | 13.475 | | | 13.65 | 12.425 | 39.55 |
| 256 | Ingvar Jochumsson (ISL) | | | 11.625 | 13.725 | 12.95 | | 38.3 |
| 257 | Anton Heidar Thorolfsson (ISL) | 12.725 | 11.45 | | | | 11.95 | 36.125 |
| 258 | Yuri van Gelder (NED) | | | 16.275 | 14.9 | | | 31.175 |
| 259 | Zou Kai (CHN) | 15.75 | | 0 | | | 15.375 | 31.125 |
| 260 | Aleksandr Safoshkin (RUS) | | | 16.475 | | 14.55 | | 31.025 |
| 261 | Kasper Fardan (DEN) | 14.65 | | | 15.95 | | | 30.6 |
| 262 | Ng Shu Wai (MAS) | 14.1 | | | 16.225 | | | 30.325 |
| 263 | Robert Stănescu (ROM) | | 14.475 | 15.1 | | | | 29.575 |
| 264 | Lin Hsiang-Wei (TPE) | 14.525 | 15.025 | | | | | 29.55 |
| 265 | Dimosthenis Tampakos (GRE) | | | 16 | | | 13.425 | 29.425 |
| 266 | Kim Ji-Hoon (KOR) | | 15.025 | | | | 14.325 | 29.35 |
| 267 | Ivelin Ivanov (BUL) | | 13.975 | | 14.3 | | | 28.275 |
| 268 | Waldo Cottle (RSA) | | 13.3 | 14.55 | | | | 27.85 |
| 269 | Christian Bruno (CHI) | | | 11.425 | | 12.6 | | 24.025 |
| 270 | Aljaž Pegan (SLO) | | | | | | 15.675 | 15.675 |
| 271 | Robert Seligman (CRO) | | 15.425 | | | | | 15.425 |
| 271 | Wajdi Bouallègue (TUN) | 15.425 | | | | | | 15.425 |
| 273 | Marijo Možnik (CRO) | | | | | | 15.2 | 15.2 |
| 274 | Jari Monkkonen (FIN) | | | | | | 15.075 | 15.075 |
| 275 | Irodotos Georgallas (CYP) | | | 14.975 | | | | 14.975 |
| 276 | Merdinyan Harutyun (ARM) | | 14.65 | | | | | 14.65 |
| 277 | Mathias Lee Hansen (DEN) | | | 14.625 | | | | 14.625 |
| 278 | Arfaoui Sabeur (TUN) | | 13.925 | | | | | 13.925 |
| 279 | Reinaldo Oquendo (PUR) | | | 13.1 | | | | 13.1 |

=== Team Final ===
| Rank | Team | Floor (gymnastics) | Pommel horse | Rings (gymnastics) | Vault (gymnastics) | Parallel bars | Horizontal bar | Total |
|---|---|---|---|---|---|---|---|---|
| 1st place, gold medalist(s) | China | 44.575 (6) | 44.775 (2) | 47.625 (1) | 48.900 (1) | 47.125 (1) | 44.775 (3) | 277.775 |
| 1st place, gold medalist(s) | Yang Wei | | 13.600 | 16.150 | 16.575 | 16.100 | | 277.775 |
| 1st place, gold medalist(s) | Feng Jing | | 15.100 | 14.975 | | 15.400 | 15.125 | 277.775 |
| 1st place, gold medalist(s) | Chen Yibing | 15.200 | | 16.500 | 16.250 | | | 277.775 |
| 1st place, gold medalist(s) | Xiao Qin | | 16.075 | | | 15.625 | 15.050 | 277.775 |
| 1st place, gold medalist(s) | Liang Fuliang | 15.325 | | | 16.075 | | | 277.775 |
| 1st place, gold medalist(s) | Zou Kai | 14.050 | | | | | 14.600 | 277.775 |
| 2nd place, silver medalist(s) | Russia | 44.125 (8) | 45.350 (1) | 46.325 (4) | 47.900 (4) | 46.900 (2) | 44.800 (2) | 275.400 |
| 2nd place, silver medalist(s) | Maksim Devyatovskiy | 14.150 | 15.000 | 14.850 | 16.175 | 15.400 | | 275.400 |
| 2nd place, silver medalist(s) | Nikolai Kryukov | | 15.600 | | 15.975 | 15.775 | 15.425 | 275.400 |
| 2nd place, silver medalist(s) | Sergei Khorokhordin | 14.800 | 14.750 | | | 15.725 | 14.950 | 275.400 |
| 2nd place, silver medalist(s) | Yury Ryazanov | | | 15.075 | 15.750 | | | 275.400 |
| 2nd place, silver medalist(s) | Dimitri Gogotov | 15.175 | | | | | 14.425 | 275.400 |
| 2nd place, silver medalist(s) | Aleksandr Safoshkin | | | 16.400 | | | | 275.400 |
| 3rd place, bronze medalist(s) | Japan | 44.425 (7) | 44.775 (2) | 47.150 (2) | 47.175 (7) | 46.225 (3) | 45.050 (1) | 274.800 |
| 3rd place, bronze medalist(s) | Hiroyuki Tomita | 14.575 | 15.350 | 15.975 | | 15.500 | 13.850 | 274.800 |
| 3rd place, bronze medalist(s) | Eichi Sekiguchi | 15.050 | | | 16.050 | | 15.700 | 274.800 |
| 3rd place, bronze medalist(s) | Naoya Tsukahara | | 14.675 | 15.575 | | 15.500 | | 274.800 |
| 3rd place, bronze medalist(s) | Hisashi Mizutori | | 14.750 | | 15.275 | | 15.500 | 274.800 |
| 3rd place, bronze medalist(s) | Takehito Mori | | | | 15.850 | 15.225 | | 274.800 |
| 3rd place, bronze medalist(s) | Takuya Nakase | 14.800 | | 15.600 | | | | 274.800 |
| 4 | Romania | 46.175 (1) | 44.700 (4) | 45.175 (6) | 48.500 (3) | 44.975 (5) | 42.700 (8) | 272.225 |
| 4 | Marian Drăgulescu | 15.850 | | | 16.500 | 14.775 | 15.125 | 272.225 |
| 4 | Flavius Koczi | 15.050 | 14.800 | | 15.675 | | 14.550 | 272.225 |
| 4 | Ilie Daniel Popescu | | 15.575 | | 16.325 | 14.900 | | 272.225 |
| 4 | Dan Potra | | 14.325 | 15.400 | | 15.300 | | 272.225 |
| 4 | Răzvan Șelariu | 15.275 | | 14.925 | | | 13.025 | 272.225 |
| 4 | Robert Stănescu | | | 14.850 | | | | 272.225 |
| 5 | Belarus | 45.325 (3) | 44.125 (6) | 46.450 (3) | 47.000 (8) | 46.100 (4) | 43.050 (7) | 272.050 |
| 5 | Ivan Ivankov | | 14.450 | 15.975 | | 15.875 | 15.225 | 272.050 |
| 5 | Dimitri Kaspiarovich | 14.975 | | 15.375 | 15.600 | 15.150 | | 272.050 |
| 5 | Dimitri Savitski | 15.025 | 14.625 | 15.100 | 15.725 | | | 272.050 |
| 5 | Denis Savenkov | 15.325 | | | 15.675 | | 14.700 | 272.050 |
| 5 | Aliaksandr Tsarevich | | 15.050 | | | 15.075 | 13.125 | 272.050 |
| 6 | Canada | 46.050 (2) | 42.725 (8) | 44.575 (7) | 48.825 (2) | 44.725 (7) | 43.450 (5) | 270.350 |
| 6 | Nathan Gafuik | | 14.675 | 14.075 | 16.275 | | 14.200 | 270.350 |
| 6 | Brandon O'Neill | 15.375 | | | 16.300 | 15.050 | | 270.350 |
| 6 | Kyle Shewfelt | 15.600 | | | 16.250 | | 14.675 | 270.350 |
| 6 | David Kikuchi | | 14.500 | 15.500 | | | 14.575 | 270.350 |
| 6 | Adam Wong | 15.075 | | 15.000 | | 14.350 | | 270.350 |
| 6 | Ken Ikeda | | 13.550 | | | 15.325 | | 270.350 |
| 7 | Germany | 44.625 (5) | 44.450 (5) | 45.300 (5) | 47.375 (6) | 44.975 (5) | 43.300 (6) | 270.025 |
| 7 | Fabian Hambüchen | 15.475 | | 15.025 | 16.225 | 15.350 | 14.600 | 270.025 |
| 7 | Thomas Andergassen | | 15.000 | 15.450 | | 14.575 | | 270.025 |
| 7 | Robert Juckel | | 14.600 | 14.825 | | | 15.000 | 270.025 |
| 7 | Philipp Boy | 14.400 | | | 15.600 | | 13.700 | 270.025 |
| 7 | Marcel Nguyen | | | | 15.550 | 15.050 | | 270.025 |
| 7 | Eugen Spiridonov | 14.750 | 14.850 | | | | | 270.025 |
| 8 | Switzerland | 44.750 (4) | 42.875 (7) | 44.550 (8) | 47.675 (5) | 43.875 (8) | 44.300 (4) | 268.025 |
| 8 | Claudio Capelli | 15.175 | 14.675 | | 15.800 | 14.525 | 13.975 | 268.025 |
| 8 | Nicolas Boeschenstein | 14.925 | | | 15.875 | 15.325 | | 268.025 |
| 8 | Mark Ramseier | | 14.475 | 14.675 | 16.000 | | | 268.025 |
| 8 | Roger Sager | 14.650 | | 14.850 | | | 15.250 | 268.025 |
| 8 | Andreas Schweizer | | | 15.025 | | 14.025 | | 268.025 |
| 8 | Daniel Groves | | 13.725 | | | | 15.075 | 268.025 |

=== All-around ===
| Rank | Gymnast | Floor (gymnastics) | Pommel horse | Rings (gymnastics) | Vault (gymnastics) | Parallel bars | Horizontal bar | Total |
|---|---|---|---|---|---|---|---|---|
| 1st place, gold medalist(s) | Yang Wei (CHN) | 15.125 | 15.350 | 16.450 | 16.625 | 16.000 | 14.850 | 94.400 |
| 2nd place, silver medalist(s) | Hiroyuki Tomita (JPN) | 15.275 | 14.975 | 15.900 | 15.850 | 15.725 | 15.450 | 93.175 |
| 3rd place, bronze medalist(s) | Fabian Hambüchen (GER) | 15.725 | 14.575 | 15.250 | 16.400 | 15.350 | 15.675 | 92.975 |
| 4 | Chen Yibing (CHN) | 15.225 | 14.925 | 16.500 | 16.200 | 15.050 | 14.725 | 92.625 |
| 5 | Maksim Devyatovskiy (RUS) | 15.250 | 15.250 | 15.375 | 16.225 | 15.550 | 14.900 | 92.550 |
| 6 | Takuya Nakase (JPN) | 15.525 | 14.475 | 15.700 | 15.350 | 15.175 | 15.425 | 91.650 |
| 7 | Yang Tae-Young (KOR) | 15.300 | 14.650 | 15.050 | 14.975 | 15.900 | 14.825 | 90.700 |
| 8 | Răzvan Șelariu (ROU) | 15.250 | 14.375 | 15.400 | 16.175 | 14.700 | 14.700 | 90.600 |
| 9 | Adam Wong (CAN) | 15.225 | 14.650 | 15.125 | 15.625 | 14.975 | 14.725 | 90.325 |
| 9 | Rafael Martínez (ESP) | 15.150 | 15.300 | 15.025 | 15.025 | 15.050 | 14.775 | 90.325 |
| 11 | Dmitri Savitski (BLR) | 14.650 | 15.050 | 15.150 | 15.775 | 14.975 | 14.500 | 90.100 |
| 12 | Joshua Jefferis (AUS) | 14.875 | 14.075 | 15.175 | 15.500 | 14.925 | 14.700 | 89.250 |
| 13 | Roman Zozulya (UKR) | 15.050 | 13.625 | 15.950 | 15.325 | 15.225 | 13.925 | 89.100 |
| 14 | Dan Potra (ROU) | 15.200 | 14.225 | 15.575 | 15.825 | 13.600 | 14.575 | 89.000 |
| 15 | Dmitri Karbonenko (FRA) | 15.400 | 14.475 | 14.575 | 15.300 | 15.050 | 14.125 | 88.925 |
| 16 | Yury Ryazanov (RUS) | 14.525 | 13.725 | 14.925 | 15.725 | 14.975 | 15.025 | 88.900 |
| 17 | Nathan Gafuik (CAN) | 15.150 | 13.925 | 14.325 | 16.150 | 14.350 | 14.350 | 88.250 |
| 18 | Guillermo Alvarez (USA) | 15.375 | 13.775 | 14.550 | 15.725 | 14.525 | 14.225 | 88.175 |
| 19 | Christos Lympanovnos (GRE) | 14.850 | 14.475 | 15.025 | 15.625 | 14.000 | 14.025 | 88.000 |
| 20 | Luis Vargas (PUR) | 15.125 | 13.625 | 14.300 | 15.650 | 15.225 | 13.525 | 87.450 |
| 21 | Mykola Kuksenkov (UKR) | 14.225 | 14.775 | 14.350 | 15.700 | 14.950 | 13.425 | 87.425 |
| 22 | Alexander Artemev (USA) | 15.075 | 14.475 | 14.250 | 15.750 | 15.525 | 12.150 | 87.225 |
| 23 | Claudio Capelli (SUI) | 14.650 | 12.525 | 14.100 | 15.875 | 13.875 | 14.225 | 85.250 |

=== Floor Exercise ===
| Rank | Gymnast | A Score | B Score | Pen. | Total |
|---|---|---|---|---|---|
| 1st place, gold medalist(s) | Marian Drăgulescu (ROU) | 6.9 | 9.350 | | 16.250 |
| 2nd place, silver medalist(s) | Diego Hypólito (BRA) | 6.7 | 9.450 | | 16.150 |
| 3rd place, bronze medalist(s) | Kyle Shewfelt (CAN) | 6.2 | 9.500 | | 15.700 |
| 4 | Gervasio Deferr (ESP) | 6.2 | 9.475 | | 15.675 |
| 5 | Yordan Yovchev (BUL) | 6.1 | 9.500 | | 15.600 |
| 6 | Zou Kai (CHN) | 6.5 | 9.050 | | 15.550 |
| 7 | Alexander Shatilov (ISR) | 6.2 | 9.325 | | 15.525 |
| 8 | Isaac Botella Pérez (ESP) | 6.0 | 8.600 | | 14.600 |

=== Pommel Horse ===
| Rank | Gymnast | A Score | B Score | Pen. | Total |
|---|---|---|---|---|---|
| 1st place, gold medalist(s) | Xiao Qin (CHN) | 6.3 | 9.725 | | 16.025 |
| 2nd place, silver medalist(s) | Prashanth Sellathurai (AUS) | 6.4 | 9.350 | | 15.750 |
| 3rd place, bronze medalist(s) | Alexander Artemev (USA) | 5.9 | 9.600 | | 15.500 |
| 4 | Nikolai Kryukov (RUS) | 6.1 | 9.350 | | 15.450 |
| 5 | Feng Jing (CHN) | 6.1 | 9.275 | | 15.375 |
| 6 | Flavius Koczi (ROU) | 6.2 | 9.150 | | 15.350 |
| 7 | Hiroyuki Tomita (JPN) | 5.9 | 9.325 | | 15.225 |
| 8 | Robert Seligman (CRO) | 6.2 | 8.550 | | 14.750 |

=== Rings ===
| Rank | Gymnast | A Score | B Score | Pen. | Total |
|---|---|---|---|---|---|
| 1st place, gold medalist(s) | Chen Yibing (CHN) | 7.0 | 9.525 | | 16.525 |
| 2nd place, silver medalist(s) | Yordan Yovchev (BUL) | 7.1 | 9.225 | | 16.325 |
| 3rd place, bronze medalist(s) | Yuri van Gelder (NED) | 6.9 | 9.400 | | 16.300 |
| 4 | Yang Wei (CHN) | 7.1 | 9.275 | | 16.275 |
| 5 | Ivan Ivankov (BLR) | 6.9 | 9.325 | | 16.225 |
| 6 | Aleksandr Safoshkin (RUS) | 7.0 | 8.850 | | 15.850 |
| 7 | Andrea Coppolino (ITA) | 7.0 | 8.625 | | 15.625 |
| 8 | Matteo Angioletti (ITA) | 6.6 | 8.900 | | 15.500 |

=== Vault ===
| Position | Gymnast | D Score | E Score | Penalty | Score 1 | D Score | E Score | Penalty | Score 2 | Total |
|---|---|---|---|---|---|---|---|---|---|---|
| 1st place, gold medalist(s) | Marian Drăgulescu (ROU) | 7.0 | 9.500 | | 16.500 | 7.0 | 9.475 | | 16.475 | 16.487 |
| 2nd place, silver medalist(s) | Dmitri Kaspiarovich (BLR) | 7.0 | 9.275 | | 16.275 | 7.0 | 9.350 | | 16.350 | 16.312 |
| 3rd place, bronze medalist(s) | Fabian Hambüchen (GER) | 6.6 | 9.475 | | 16.075 | 6.2 | 9.375 | | 15.575 | 15.825 |
| 4 | Yernar Yerimbetov (KAZ) | 6.6 | 9.450 | 0.1 | 15.950 | 7.0 | 8.575 | 0.1 | 15.475 | 15.712 |
| 5 | Diego Hypólito (BRA) | 6.6 | 9.550 | | 16.150 | 6.6 | 8.875 | 0.3 | 15.175 | 15.662 |
| 6 | Leszek Blanik (POL) | 7.0 | 8.900 | 0.1 | 15.800 | 7.0 | 8.500 | | 15.500 | 15.650 |
| 7 | Jevgēņijs Saproņenko (LAT) | 7.0 | 8.150 | 0.3 | 14.850 | 7.0 | 8.975 | | 15.975 | 15.412 |
| 8 | Raphael Wignanitz (FRA) | 7.0 | 8.000 | 0.3 | 14.700 | 6.6 | 9.175 | | 15.775 | 15.237 |

=== Parallel Bars ===
| Rank | Gymnast | A Score | B Score | Pen. | Total |
|---|---|---|---|---|---|
| 1st place, gold medalist(s) | Yang Wei (CHN) | 6.6 | 9.475 | | 16.075 |
| 2nd place, silver medalist(s) | Hiroyuki Tomita (JPN) | 6.3 | 9.650 | | 15.950 |
| 2nd place, silver medalist(s) | Yoo Won-Chul (KOR) | 6.4 | 9.550 | | 15.950 |
| 4 | Vasileios Tsolakidis (GRE) | 6.4 | 9.525 | | 15.925 |
| 5 | Ivan Ivankov (BLR) | 6.5 | 9.350 | | 15.850 |
| 6 | Yang Tae-Young (KOR) | 6.6 | 9.125 | | 15.725 |
| 7 | Takehito Mori (JPN) | 6.2 | 9.500 | | 15.700 |
| 8 | Anton Fokin (UZB) | 6.4 | 9.050 | | 15.450 |

=== Horizontal Bar ===
| Rank | Gymnast | A Score | B Score | Pen. | Total |
|---|---|---|---|---|---|
| 1st place, gold medalist(s) | Philippe Rizzo (AUS) | 6.6 | 9.525 | | 16.125 |
| 2nd place, silver medalist(s) | Aljaž Pegan (SLO) | 6.5 | 9.400 | | 15.900 |
| 3rd place, bronze medalist(s) | Vlasios Maras (GRE) | 6.2 | 9.600 | | 15.800 |
| 4 | Hiroyuki Tomita (JPN) | 6.2 | 9.350 | | 15.550 |
| 5 | Nikolai Kryukov (RUS) | 6.0 | 9.525 | | 15.525 |
| 6 | Takehito Mori (JPN) | 6.1 | 8.775 | | 14.875 |
| 7 | Kim Seung-Il (KOR) | 5.9 | 8.475 | | 14.375 |
| 8 | Marian Drăgulescu (ROU) | 4.0 | 7.325 | | 11.325 |

== Women ==
=== Qualification ===
| Rank | Team | Vault | Uneven bars | Balance beam | Floor (gymnastics) | Total |
|---|---|---|---|---|---|---|
| 1 | Chellsie Memmel (USA) | 14.95 | 15.825 | 15.225 | 15.35 | 61.350 Q |
| 2 | Vanessa Ferrari (ITA) | 14.65 | 15.7 | 15.375 | 15.375 | 61.100 Q |
| 3 | Jana Bieger (USA) | 14.75 | 15.5 | 15.125 | 15.25 | 60.625 Q |
| 4 | Beth Tweddle (GBR) | 14.4 | 15.675 | 14.8 | 15.1 | 59.975 Q |
| 5 | Laís Souza (BRA) | 14.95 | 14.55 | 15.225 | 15.15 | 59.875 Q |
| 6 | Steliana Nistor (ROM) | 14.85 | 15.2 | 15.475 | 14.325 | 59.850 Q |
| 7 | Sandra Izbașa (ROM) | 15 | 14.225 | 15.55 | 15.05 | 59.825 Q |
| 8 | Zhou Zhuoru (CHN) | 14.475 | 15.15 | 15.275 | 14.6 | 59.500 Q |
| 9 | Ashley Priess (USA) | 14.675 | 15.45 | 14.25 | 14.7 | 59.075 |
| 10 | Oksana Chusovitina (GER) | 15.025 | 14.8 | 14.85 | 14.4 | 59.075 Q |
| 11 | Natasha Kelley (USA) | 14.6 | 14.95 | 14.45 | 14.975 | 58.975 |
| 12 | Pang Panpan (CHN) | 14.025 | 15.125 | 15.3 | 14.325 | 58.775 Q |
| 13 | Isabelle Severino (FRA) | 14.6 | 14.025 | 15.2 | 14.925 | 58.750 Q |
| 14 | Daria Joura (AUS) | 14.425 | 15.275 | 14.525 | 14.275 | 58.500 Q |
| 15 | Anna Pavlova (RUS) | 14.85 | 14.35 | 15.525 | 13.7 | 58.425 Q |
| 16 | Hollie Dykes (AUS) | 14.075 | 14.875 | 14.85 | 14.475 | 58.275 Q |
| 17 | Zhang Nan (CHN) | 14.6 | 12.95 | 16.075 | 14.625 | 58.25 |
| 18 | Dariya Zgoba (UKR) | 13.425 | 14.975 | 15.3 | 14.4 | 58.100 Q |
| 19 | Ariella Käslin (SUI) | 14.525 | 14.125 | 15.075 | 14.3 | 58.025 Q |
| 20 | He Ning (CHN) | 13.6 | 14.775 | 15.075 | 14.425 | 57.875 |
| 21 | Kristina Pravdina (RUS) | 13.75 | 14.55 | 15.25 | 14.3 | 57.850 Q |
| 22 | Daniele Hypólito (BRA) | 13.95 | 14.075 | 15.05 | 14.725 | 57.800 Q |
| 23 | Laura Campos (ESP) | 14.85 | 14.6 | 14.2 | 14.1 | 57.750 Q |
| 24 | Elena Zamolodchikova (RUS) | 15.075 | 14.175 | 13.775 | 14.675 | 57.7 |
| 25 | Mayu Kuroda (JPN) | 13.4 | 15.175 | 15.075 | 13.675 | 57.325 Q |
| 26 | Lenika de Simone (ESP) | 13.825 | 13.925 | 15.025 | 14.375 | 57.150 Q |
| 27 | Hong Su-jong (PRK) | 15.525 | 13.5 | 14.25 | 13.675 | 56.950 Q |
| 28 | Katheleen Lindor (FRA) | 14.525 | 13.975 | 14.7 | 13.75 | 56.950 Q |
| 29 | Alina Kozich (UKR) | 14.25 | 13.95 | 14.975 | 13.625 | 56.800 Q |
| 30 | Elyse Hopfner-Hibbs (CAN) | 13.925 | 13.725 | 15.375 | 13.725 | 56.750 R |
| 31 | Melody Hernandez (AUS) | 13.8 | 14.625 | 14.325 | 13.95 | 56.7 |
| 32 | Jana Komrsková (CZE) | 14.375 | 13.975 | 14.65 | 13.625 | 56.625 R |
| 33 | Elsa García (MEX) | 14.375 | 14.975 | 13.325 | 13.85 | 56.525 R |
| 34 | Kyoko Oshima (JPN) | 13.775 | 13.85 | 14.325 | 14.525 | 56.475 R |
| 35 | Monica Bergamelli (ITA) | 13.825 | 13.575 | 14.7 | 14.025 | 56.125 |
| 36 | Hong Un-jong (PRK) | 14.65 | 14.15 | 13.9 | 13.375 | 56.075 |
| 37 | Maryna Proskurina (UKR) | 14.45 | 14.45 | 13.525 | 13.65 | 56.075 |
| 38 | Daniela Druncea (ROM) | 14.75 | 12.7 | 14.3 | 14.25 | 56 |
| 39 | Aisling Williams (GBR) | 13.775 | 13.95 | 14.475 | 13.7 | 55.9 |
| 40 | Loes Linders (NED) | 13.775 | 13.35 | 14.525 | 14.15 | 55.8 |
| 41 | Stefani Bismpikou (GRE) | 13.425 | 13.5 | 15.075 | 13.75 | 55.75 |
| 42 | Alyssa Brown (CAN) | 14.225 | 13.475 | 14.475 | 13.55 | 55.725 |
| 43 | Lynette Lisle (GBR) | 13.875 | 14.025 | 13.95 | 13.825 | 55.675 |
| 44 | Manami Ishizaka (JPN) | 14.1 | 14.225 | 13.25 | 14.075 | 55.65 |
| 45 | Viktoria Karpenko (BUL) | 13.525 | 13.825 | 14.425 | 13.85 | 55.625 |
| 46 | Carina Hasenöhrl (AUT) | 14.55 | 13.925 | 12.875 | 14.2 | 55.55 |
| 47 | Marta Pihan (POL) | 13.8 | 14.3 | 14.75 | 12.675 | 55.525 |
| 48 | Miki Uemura (JPN) | 13.8 | 14.45 | 14.275 | 12.95 | 55.475 |
| 49 | Verona van de Leur (NED) | 13.975 | 13.35 | 14.275 | 13.85 | 55.45 |
| 50 | Marci Bernholtz (CAN) | 13.725 | 14.375 | 13.6 | 13.675 | 55.375 |
| 51 | Mélodie Pulgarín (ESP) | 13.9 | 13.875 | 13.75 | 13.775 | 55.3 |
| 52 | Berber van den Berg (NED) | 14.375 | 13.85 | 13.175 | 13.725 | 55.125 |
| 53 | Marisela Cantú (MEX) | 13.825 | 13.75 | 13.825 | 13.55 | 54.95 |
| 54 | Lindsay Lindor (FRA) | 14.175 | 12.6 | 14.05 | 13.875 | 54.7 |
| 55 | Pyon Kwang-sun (PRK) | 13.6 | 14.525 | 14.65 | 11.875 | 54.65 |
| 56 | Jelena Zanevskaja (LTU) | 13.2 | 13.8 | 13.85 | 13.625 | 54.475 |
| 57 | Aagje Vanwalleghem (BEL) | 14.225 | 13.325 | 13.35 | 13.475 | 54.375 |
| 58 | Crystal Gilmore (CAN) | 13.675 | 13.5 | 14.2 | 12.975 | 54.35 |
| 59 | Kim Myong-bok (PRK) | 14.275 | 14.175 | 13.475 | 12.375 | 54.3 |
| 60 | Tina Erceg (CRO) | 13.425 | 12.875 | 14.15 | 13.825 | 54.275 |
| 61 | Kim Bui (GER) | 13.625 | 13.975 | 12.675 | 13.85 | 54.125 |
| 62 | Veronica Wagner (SWE) | 13.8 | 12.35 | 14.525 | 13.4 | 54.075 |
| 63 | Vered Finkel (ISR) | 13.35 | 12.7 | 14.05 | 13.925 | 54.025 |
| 64 | Nikolina Tankoucheva (BUL) | 13.9 | 13.15 | 13.225 | 13.675 | 53.95 |
| 65 | Heike Gunne (GER) | 13.375 | 14.4 | 12.775 | 13.35 | 53.9 |
| 66 | Hanneke Hoefnagel (NED) | 13.075 | 13.525 | 13.975 | 13.275 | 53.85 |
| 67 | Joanna Skowrońska (POL) | 14.35 | 12.9 | 12.825 | 13.65 | 53.725 |
| 68 | Daria Bijak (GER) | 13.85 | 13.625 | 12.425 | 13.375 | 53.275 |
| 69 | Viktoria Makshtarova (BLR) | 12.85 | 13.5 | 13.925 | 13 | 53.275 |
| 70 | Carina Fürst (SUI) | 13.325 | 12.625 | 14.025 | 13.2 | 53.175 |
| 71 | Fanny Briceño (VEN) | 13.65 | 13.225 | 13.575 | 12.725 | 53.175 |
| 72 | Yeo Su-jung (KOR) | 13.425 | 13.85 | 13.325 | 12.525 | 53.125 |
| 73 | Sif Palsdóttir (ISL) | 13.775 | 13.55 | 13.15 | 12.525 | 53 |
| 74 | Jana Šikulová (CZE) | 13.7 | 13.725 | 12.45 | 13.075 | 52.95 |
| 75 | Bibiana Vélez (COL) | 13.85 | 13.575 | 12.6 | 12.875 | 52.9 |
| 76 | Vasiliki Millousi (GRE) | 12.825 | 13.45 | 13.45 | 13.1 | 52.825 |
| 77 | Chloé Henry (BEL) | 13.35 | 13.325 | 13.275 | 12.775 | 52.725 |
| 78 | Aylen González (ARG) | 13.4 | 12.175 | 13.375 | 13.725 | 52.675 |
| 79 | Kim Hyo-bin (KOR) | 12.4 | 13.9 | 12.9 | 13.25 | 52.45 |
| 80 | Yu Han-sol (KOR) | 13.2 | 12.85 | 13.15 | 13.1 | 52.3 |
| 81 | Joanna Litewka (POL) | 13.925 | 12.975 | 12.2 | 13.075 | 52.175 |
| 82 | Nastassia Marachkouskaya (BLR) | 13.575 | 11 | 13.4 | 14.175 | 52.15 |
| 83 | Göksu Üçtaş (TUR) | 13.875 | 11.225 | 12.725 | 14.25 | 52.075 |
| 84 | Jessica Gil Ortiz (COL) | 14.225 | 12.525 | 11.475 | 13.85 | 52.075 |
| 85 | Annamari Maaranen (FIN) | 13.325 | 12.85 | 12.45 | 13.275 | 51.9 |
| 86 | Fanni Helminen (FIN) | 13.275 | 13.075 | 13.275 | 12.2 | 51.825 |
| 87 | Charlotte Buer (NOR) | 13.05 | 11.9 | 13.35 | 13.275 | 51.575 |
| 88 | Silvia Georgieva (BUL) | 13.05 | 12.275 | 13.225 | 13.025 | 51.575 |
| 89 | Marta Tajdus (POL) | 13.225 | 12.125 | 12.725 | 13.375 | 51.45 |
| 90 | Candice Cronje (RSA) | 13.75 | 11.3 | 13.2 | 13.1 | 51.35 |
| 91 | Laura Moreno (MEX) | 13.825 | 12.8 | 11.875 | 12.775 | 51.275 |
| 92 | Sandra Mayer (AUT) | 13.125 | 12.275 | 13 | 12.875 | 51.275 |
| 93 | Tatyana Gayfulina (UZB) | 13.025 | 11.925 | 13.6 | 12.475 | 51.025 |
| 94 | Yeny Ibarra (MEX) | 13.925 | 12.25 | 11.95 | 12.9 | 51.025 |
| 95 | Sol Poliandri (ARG) | 13.65 | 11.975 | 11.85 | 13.5 | 50.975 |
| 96 | Nadir Domeneghini (ARG) | 12.925 | 11.9 | 12.775 | 13.3 | 50.9 |
| 97 | Bae Mul-eum (KOR) | 13.6 | 13 | 12.15 | 12.15 | 50.9 |
| 98 | Rinette Whelpton (RSA) | 12.875 | 11.75 | 13 | 13.225 | 50.85 |
| 99 | Tanja Delladio (CRO) | 13.4 | 13.275 | 13.05 | 11.075 | 50.8 |
| 100 | Viktoria Tsakalidou (GRE) | 13.65 | 11.675 | 12.375 | 12.9 | 50.6 |
| 101 | Krisztina Szarka (HUN) | 13.55 | 10.975 | 12.725 | 13.15 | 50.4 |
| 102 | Tal Liak (ISR) | 13.075 | 13.4 | 12.075 | 11.8 | 50.35 |
| 103 | Martina Castro (CHI) | 13.325 | 11.05 | 13.375 | 12.55 | 50.3 |
| 104 | Agostina Fratantueno (ARG) | 13.225 | 11.175 | 12.85 | 13 | 50.25 |
| 105 | Ivet Rojas (VEN) | 12.95 | 13 | 12.625 | 11.65 | 50.225 |
| 106 | Dora Sarpaneva (FIN) | 12.975 | 12.15 | 12.075 | 12.8 | 50 |
| 107 | Annika Urvikko (FIN) | 13.65 | 12 | 11.575 | 12.675 | 49.9 |
| 108 | Natalia Paulíčková (SVK) | 13.675 | 11.775 | 11.325 | 12.875 | 49.65 |
| 109 | Mária Homolová (SVK) | 12.45 | 11 | 13.5 | 12.675 | 49.625 |
| 110 | Simona Castro (CHI) | 13.5 | 10.5 | 13.325 | 12.125 | 49.45 |
| 111 | Volha Shakots (BLR) | 13.225 | 11.35 | 11.725 | 13.125 | 49.425 |
| 112 | Diana Bludova (LTU) | 12.525 | 12.1 | 12.425 | 12.35 | 49.4 |
| 113 | Laura Gombás (HUN) | 13.525 | 11.125 | 12.15 | 12.475 | 49.275 |
| 114 | Caroline Dolen (NOR) | 13.775 | 10.9 | 12.025 | 12.55 | 49.25 |
| 115 | Sandra Ostad (NOR) | 12.725 | 11.625 | 12.475 | 12.35 | 49.175 |
| 116 | Leysha López (PUR) | 13.25 | 11.35 | 12.7 | 11.85 | 49.15 |
| 117 | Veneta Hristova (BUL) | 13 | 10.875 | 12.475 | 12.6 | 48.95 |
| 118 | Margrét Karlsdóttir (ISL) | 12.225 | 11.3 | 13.275 | 12.1 | 48.9 |
| 119 | Karlyann Santiago (PUR) | 12.425 | 10.55 | 12.9 | 13 | 48.875 |
| 120 | Kathrine Hansson (NOR) | 13.425 | 12.425 | 11.425 | 11.6 | 48.875 |
| 121 | Tijana Tkalčec (CRO) | 13.55 | 11.325 | 11.9 | 11.825 | 48.6 |
| 122 | Maciel Peña (VEN) | 13.6 | 11.875 | 12.975 | 10.125 | 48.575 |
| 123 | Agneta Ergle (LAT) | 11.975 | 12.375 | 11.95 | 12.275 | 48.575 |
| 124 | Tal Scheck (ISR) | 12.625 | 12.45 | 11.375 | 11.9 | 48.35 |
| 125 | Mette Hulgaard (DEN) | 13.075 | 11.225 | 12.275 | 11.6 | 48.175 |
| 126 | Carmen Horvat (SLO) | 13.275 | 9.8 | 13 | 11.925 | 48 |
| 127 | Hera Jóhannesdóttir (ISL) | 12.625 | 10.55 | 12.325 | 12.4 | 47.9 |
| 128 | Nourhan Ahmed Saad (EGY) | 13.05 | 9.25 | 12.1 | 13.175 | 47.575 |
| 129 | Emma Lindevall (SWE) | 12.9 | 12.3 | 10.025 | 12.15 | 47.375 |
| 130 | Yarimar Medina (VEN) | 13 | 10.05 | 12.075 | 12.25 | 47.375 |
| 131 | Carolina Alarcón (CHI) | 13.15 | 10.1 | 12.025 | 11.85 | 47.125 |
| 132 | Josefine Backe (SWE) | 12.775 | 11.45 | 11.65 | 11.2 | 47.075 |
| 133 | Chen Chun-Min (TPE) | 12.6 | 10.125 | 11.8 | 12.5 | 47.025 |
| 134 | Makarena Pinto (CHI) | 13.575 | 11.25 | 11.475 | 10.525 | 46.825 |
| 135 | Miriam Offersgaard (DEN) | 13.275 | 8.775 | 12.6 | 12.15 | 46.8 |
| 136 | Melany Cabrera (CHI) | 11.6 | 10.1 | 12.85 | 12.175 | 46.725 |
| 137 | Jekaterina Appel (EST) | 12.9 | 9.175 | 12.8 | 11.675 | 46.55 |
| 138 | Catalina Escobar (COL) | 13.15 | 9.8 | 12.7 | 10.775 | 46.425 |
| 139 | Michelle Lauritsen (DEN) | 12.975 | 10.7 | 11.425 | 10.75 | 45.85 |
| 140 | Alicia Sacramone (USA) | 15.55 | | 15.175 | 14.875 | 45.6 |
| 141 | Olga Shcherbatykh (UKR) | 14.425 | | 15.4 | 14.9 | 44.725 |
| 142 | Svetlana Klyukina (RUS) | | 14.675 | 15.325 | 14.625 | 44.625 |
| 143 | Yashira López (PUR) | 13 | 10.85 | 9.975 | 10.6 | 44.425 |
| 144 | Daiane Dos Santos (BRA) | 14.575 | 14.7 | | 15.05 | 44.325 |
| 145 | Grainne Johnston (IRL) | 12.675 | 10.05 | 11.75 | 9.725 | 44.2 |
| 146 | Sarah Hopkins (IRL) | 12.425 | 8.85 | 11.5 | 11.125 | 43.9 |
| 147 | Karen Nguyen (AUS) | 13.6 | 14.675 | 14.9 | | 43.175 |
| 148 | Thais Escolar (ESP) | 14.025 | | 14.375 | 14.5 | 42.9 |
| 149 | Olivia Vivian (AUS) | | 15.15 | 13.95 | 13.775 | 42.875 |
| 150 | Polina Miller (RUS) | 14.375 | 14.875 | | 13.55 | 42.8 |
| 151 | Elena Chiric (ROM) | 13.95 | | 14.75 | 14 | 42.7 |
| 152 | Carlotta Giovannini (ITA) | 14.8 | 14.375 | | 13.375 | 42.55 |
| 153 | Patricia Moreno (ESP) | | 13.05 | 14.65 | 14.775 | 42.475 |
| 154 | Maryna Kostiuchenko (UKR) | 13.6 | 14.15 | | 14.6 | 42.35 |
| 155 | Federica Macrì (ITA) | 14.525 | 13.575 | 14.175 | | 42.275 |
| 156 | Erika Morel (FRA) | 13.775 | | 14.325 | 14.05 | 42.15 |
| 157 | Julie Martinez (FRA) | 13.8 | 14.325 | | 13.825 | 41.95 |
| 158 | Bruna da Costa (BRA) | 13.9 | | 13.6 | 14.35 | 41.85 |
| 159 | Loredana Sucar (ROM) | 14 | 13.375 | | 14.175 | 41.55 |
| 160 | Olivia Bryl (GBR) | | 13.35 | 13.75 | 13.725 | 40.825 |
| 161 | Danielle Englert (SUI) | 13.975 | 14.725 | 12 | | 40.7 |
| 162 | Danila Koster (NED) | 13.475 | | 14.275 | 12.95 | 40.7 |
| 163 | Paschalina Mitrakou (GRE) | 12.6 | | 14.525 | 13.325 | 40.45 |
| 164 | Sara Bradaschia (ITA) | 13.85 | | 12.625 | 13.875 | 40.35 |
| 165 | Camila Comin (BRA) | 13.95 | 12.775 | 13.35 | | 40.075 |
| 166 | Martina Strnadová (CZE) | 13.65 | 13.25 | 13.15 | | 40.05 |
| 167 | Leigh Rogers (GBR) | 13.55 | 12.775 | 13.625 | | 39.95 |
| 168 | Ericka García (MEX) | | 13.85 | 12.675 | 13.375 | 39.9 |
| 169 | Aksana Novikava (BLR) | 13.65 | 13.3 | | 12.525 | 39.475 |
| 170 | Adéla Pavouková (CZE) | 13.625 | 13.2 | | 12.55 | 39.375 |
| 171 | Nicole Pechancová (CZE) | | 13 | 12.825 | 13.525 | 39.35 |
| 172 | Veronika Ožanová (CZE) | 13.9 | | 11.8 | 13.4 | 39.1 |
| 173 | Juliana Chaves Santos (BRA) | | 13.225 | 13.05 | 12.2 | 38.475 |
| 174 | Liudmila Dmitranitsa (BLR) | 12.9 | 12.3 | 12.25 | | 37.45 |
| 175 | Eugenia Ficosecco (ARG) | | 12.125 | 12.725 | 12.4 | 37.25 |
| 176 | Sabina Flückiger (SUI) | 13.35 | 11.575 | | 12.075 | 37 |
| 177 | Mariana Stankova (BUL) | 12.6 | | 11.925 | 12.275 | 36.8 |
| 178 | Paula Koza (POL) | 13.1 | 12.425 | 10.6 | | 36.125 |
| 179 | Marie Jaeger (DEN) | 12.45 | | 12.5 | 11.1 | 36.05 |
| 180 | Bernice Martínez (PUR) | 12.9 | 2.125 | 9.475 | 11.45 | 35.95 |
| 181 | Stephanie Pizzignacco (SWE) | 13.175 | 10.35 | | 12.275 | 35.8 |
| 182 | Malin Hvetlander (SWE) | 12.75 | | 11.775 | 11.25 | 35.775 |
| 183 | Julie Hansson (NOR) | 13.025 | 11.95 | 10 | | 34.975 |
| 184 | Gabriella Sanguineti (PUR) | | 8.975 | 11.5 | 11.275 | 31.75 |
| 185 | Cheng Fei (CHN) | 16.075 | | | 15.475 | 31.55 |
| 186 | Iryna Krasnianska (UKR) | | 15.725 | 15.775 | | 31.5 |
| 187 | Tania Gener (ESP) | 14.375 | 14.225 | | | 28.6 |
| 188 | Li Ya (CHN) | | 14.45 | 13.975 | | 28.425 |
| 189 | Georgia Bonora (AUS) | 13.925 | | | 14.2 | 28.125 |
| 190 | Emma White (GBR) | 13.85 | | | 14.05 | 27.9 |
| 191 | Florica Leonida (ROM) | | 13.25 | 14.375 | | 27.625 |
| 192 | Rebecca Simbhudas (CAN) | 13.575 | 14.05 | | | 27.625 |
| 193 | Cha Yong-hwa (PRK) | 13.3 | 14.275 | | | 27.575 |
| 194 | Jenny Kohler (FRA) | | 13.575 | 13.95 | | 27.525 |
| 195 | Melanie Marti (SUI) | | 13.875 | 13.575 | | 27.45 |
| 196 | Vasiliki Georgakopoulou (GRE) | | 13.225 | 14.125 | | 27.35 |
| 197 | Linda Stämpfli (SUI) | | | 13.775 | 13.525 | 27.3 |
| 198 | Brittnee Habbib (CAN) | | | 13.425 | 13.775 | 27.2 |
| 199 | Ayaka Sahara (JPN) | | | 13.75 | 13.4 | 27.15 |
| 200 | Lorena Coza (ITA) | | 13.7 | 13.35 | | 27.05 |
| 201 | Theresa Sporer (GER) | 14.475 | | | 12.425 | 26.9 |
| 202 | Svenja Hickel (GER) | | 13.85 | 12.85 | | 26.7 |
| 203 | Erika Mizoguchi (JPN) | 13.6 | 12.975 | | | 26.575 |
| 204 | Evgenia Zafeiraki (GRE) | 13.75 | 12.65 | | | 26.4 |
| 205 | Adela Šajn (SLO) | | | 13.55 | 12.85 | 26.4 |
| 206 | Kang Ji-na (KOR) | 12.9 | 13.475 | | | 26.375 |
| 207 | Han Eun-bi (KOR) | | | 13.85 | 12.5 | 26.35 |
| 208 | Kim Un-hyang (PRK) | | | 13.75 | 12.425 | 26.175 |
| 209 | Siiri Lehtio (FIN) | 12.9 | | 12.575 | | 25.475 |
| 210 | Kiira Kokko (FIN) | | 11.225 | | 12.275 | 23.5 |
| 211 | Inga Gunnarsdóttir (ISL) | | 11.35 | 11.75 | | 23.1 |
| 212 | Alina Sycheuskaya (BLR) | | | 10.025 | 13.05 | 23.075 |
| 213 | Maria Majtorp (SWE) | | 10.975 | 9.05 | | 20.025 |
| 214 | Nastia Liukin (USA) | | 16.2 | | | 16.2 |
| 215 | Anna Grudko (RUS) | 14.875 | | 0 | | 14.875 |
| 216 | Lichelle Wong (NED) | | 13.85 | | | 13.85 |
| 217 | Marisela Arizmendi (MEX) | 13.475 | | | | 13.475 |
| 218 | Gergana Ivanova (BUL) | | 13 | | | 13 |
| 219 | Tatiana Potochnik (ARG) | 12.9 | | | | 12.9 |
| 220 | Anna Turczyńska (POL) | | | | 12.55 | 12.55 |
| 221 | Heba Moustafa Abou (EGY) | | 11.375 | 0 | | 11.375 |
| 222 | Genesis Monsalve (VEN) | | 11.075 | 0 | | 11.075 |
| 223 | Ditte Valsgaard (DEN) | | 9.025 | | | 9.025 |

=== Team Final ===
| Rank | Team | Vault (gymnastics) | Uneven bars | Balance beam | Floor (gymnastics) | Total |
|---|---|---|---|---|---|---|
| 1st place, gold medalist(s) | China | 44.250 (4) | 45.300 (1) | 46.775 (1) | 45.875 (2) | 182.200 |
| 1st place, gold medalist(s) | Pang Panpan | | 15.150 | 15.550 | 15.425 | 182.200 |
| 1st place, gold medalist(s) | Zhang Nan | 14.525 | | 15.950 | 14.800 | 182.200 |
| 1st place, gold medalist(s) | Cheng Fei | 15.275 | | | 15.650 | 182.200 |
| 1st place, gold medalist(s) | He Ning | | 15.000 | 15.275 | | 182.200 |
| 1st place, gold medalist(s) | Zhou Zhuoru | 14.450 | 15.150 | | | 182.200 |
| 1st place, gold medalist(s) | Li Ya | | | | | 182.200 |
| 2nd place, silver medalist(s) | United States | 44.600 (2) | 45.275 (2) | 45.575 (3) | 45.900 (1) | 181.350 |
| 2nd place, silver medalist(s) | Chellsie Memmel | 15.075 | 14.475 | 15.050 | 15.500 | 181.350 |
| 2nd place, silver medalist(s) | Jana Bieger | 13.950 | 15.100 | 15.175 | 15.150 | 181.350 |
| 2nd place, silver medalist(s) | Alicia Sacramone | 15.575 | | 15.350 | 15.250 | 181.350 |
| 2nd place, silver medalist(s) | Nastia Liukin | | 15.700 | | | 181.350 |
| 2nd place, silver medalist(s) | Ashley Priess | | | | | 181.350 |
| 2nd place, silver medalist(s) | Natasha Kelley | | | | | 181.350 |
| 3rd place, bronze medalist(s) | Russia | 45.325 (1) | 42.300 (7) | 45.750 (2) | 43.950 (5) | 177.325 |
| 3rd place, bronze medalist(s) | Anna Pavlova | 15.100 | | 15.375 | 14.225 | 177.325 |
| 3rd place, bronze medalist(s) | Kristina Pravdina | | 13.675 | 15.075 | 14.600 | 177.325 |
| 3rd place, bronze medalist(s) | Elena Zamolodchikova | 15.125 | | | 15.125 | 177.325 |
| 3rd place, bronze medalist(s) | Svetlana Klyukina | | 14.825 | 15.300 | | 177.325 |
| 3rd place, bronze medalist(s) | Anna Grudko | 15.100 | | | | 177.325 |
| 3rd place, bronze medalist(s) | Polina Miller | | 13.800 | | | 177.325 |
| 4 | Romania | 44.450 (3) | 41.550 (8) | 45.225 (4) | 44.225 (3) | 175.450 |
| 4 | Sandra Izbașa | 15.225 | 14.400 | 15.275 | 15.425 | 175.450 |
| 4 | Steliana Nistor | 14.700 | 14.100 | 15.375 | 14.450 | 175.450 |
| 4 | Daniela Druncea | 14.525 | 13.050 | | 14.350 | 175.450 |
| 4 | Elena Chiric | | | 14.575 | | 175.450 |
| 4 | Loredana Sucar | | | | | 175.450 |
| 4 | Florica Leonida | | | | | 175.450 |
| 5 | Ukraine | 42.800 (7) | 43.950 (3) | 44.325 (5) | 43.175 (6) | 174.250 |
| 5 | Olga Shcherbatykh | 14.325 | | 14.650 | 13.850 | 174.250 |
| 5 | Iryna Krasnianska | | 15.125 | 15.550 | | 174.250 |
| 5 | Dariya Zgoba | | 15.200 | 14.125 | | 174.250 |
| 5 | Alina Kozich | 13.725 | | | 14.750 | 174.250 |
| 5 | Marina Proskurina | 14.750 | 13.625 | | | 174.250 |
| 5 | Marina Kostiuchenko | | | | 14.575 | 174.250 |
| 6 | Australia | 43.050 (6) | 43.550 (5) | 43.875 (6) | 42.750 (7) | 173.225 |
| 6 | Daria Joura | 14.725 | 14.500 | 14.875 | 14.175 | 173.225 |
| 6 | Hollie Dykes | 14.325 | 14.150 | 14.500 | 14.300 | 173.225 |
| 6 | Georgia Bonora | 14.000 | | | 14.275 | 173.225 |
| 6 | Olivia Vivian | | 14.900 | | | 173.225 |
| 6 | Karen Nguyen | | | 14.500 | | 173.225 |
| 6 | Melody Hernandez | | | | | 173.225 |
| 7 | Brazil | 43.650 (5) | 42.800 (6) | 42.425 (7) | 44.100 (4) | 172.975 |
| 7 | Laís Souza | 15.000 | 14.625 | 14.400 | 14.375 | 172.975 |
| 7 | Daniele Hypólito | 13.950 | 13.850 | 15.100 | 14.700 | 172.975 |
| 7 | Daiane dos Santos | 14.700 | 14.325 | | 15.025 | 172.975 |
| 7 | Bruna da Costa | | | 12.925 | | 172.975 |
| 7 | Camila Comin | | | | | 172.975 |
| 7 | Juliana Chaves Santos | | | | | 172.975 |
| 8 | Spain | 42.450 (8) | 43.900 (4) | 42.025 (8) | 42.100 (8) | 170.475 |
| 8 | Thais Escolar | 14.100 | | 15.200 | 14.500 | 170.475 |
| 8 | Lenika de Simone | | 14.750 | 14.275 | 14.300 | 170.475 |
| 8 | Laura Campos | 14.650 | 14.575 | 12.550 | | 170.475 |
| 8 | Tania Gener | 13.700 | 14.575 | | | 170.475 |
| 8 | Patricia Moreno | | | | 13.300 | 170.475 |
| 8 | Mélodie Pulgarín | | | | | 170.475 |

=== All-around ===
| Rank | Gymnast | Vault (gymnastics) | Uneven bars | Balance beam | Floor (gymnastics) | Total |
|---|---|---|---|---|---|---|
| 1st place, gold medalist(s) | Vanessa Ferrari (ITA) | 14.800 | 15.825 | 14.900 | 15.500 | 61.025 |
| 2nd place, silver medalist(s) | Jana Bieger (USA) | 14.725 | 15.350 | 15.300 | 15.375 | 60.750 |
| 3rd place, bronze medalist(s) | Sandra Izbașa (ROM) | 15.025 | 14.225 | 15.475 | 15.525 | 60.250 |
| 4 | Steliana Nistor (ROM) | 14.275 | 15.275 | 15.800 | 14.600 | 59.950 |
| 5 | Daria Joura (AUS) | 14.500 | 15.100 | 15.000 | 15.275 | 59.875 |
| 6 | Pang Panpan (CHN) | 14.025 | 15.425 | 14.800 | 15.425 | 59.675 |
| 7 | Hollie Dykes (AUS) | 14.350 | 14.975 | 15.625 | 14.550 | 59.500 |
| 8 | Beth Tweddle (GBR) | 14.550 | 14.700 | 14.950 | 15.250 | 59.450 |
| 9 | Oksana Chusovitina (GER) | 15.000 | 14.700 | 14.375 | 14.875 | 58.950 |
| 10 | Ashley Priess (USA) | 14.450 | 15.425 | 15.325 | 13.600 | 58.800 |
| 11 | Isabelle Severino (FRA) | 14.600 | 14.100 | 14.925 | 15.000 | 58.625 |
| 12 | Zhou Zhuoru (CHN) | 14.300 | 15.150 | 14.425 | 14.700 | 58.575 |
| 13 | Alina Kozich (UKR) | 14.500 | 13.875 | 15.175 | 14.650 | 58.200 |
| 14 | Laura Campos (ESP) | 14.825 | 14.550 | 14.575 | 14.150 | 58.100 |
| 15 | Mayu Kuroda (JPN) | 13.400 | 15.550 | 15.100 | 13.925 | 57.975 |
| 16 | Elyse Hopfner-Hibbs (CAN) | 13.950 | 14.325 | 15.125 | 14.300 | 57.700 |
| 16 | Lenika de Simone (ESP) | 13.725 | 14.900 | 14.650 | 14.425 | 57.700 |
| 18 | Ariella Käslin (SUI) | 13.575 | 14.675 | 15.075 | 14.350 | 57.675 |
| 19 | Anna Pavlova (RUS) | 14.925 | 13.900 | 14.225 | 14.575 | 57.625 |
| 20 | Katheleen Lindor (FRA) | 14.450 | 14.125 | 14.725 | 14.300 | 57.600 |
| 21 | Daniele Hypólito (BRA) | 13.750 | 14.150 | 14.575 | 14.700 | 57.175 |
| 22 | Dariya Zgoba (UKR) | 13.650 | 15.600 | 14.075 | 13.600 | 56.925 |
| 23 | Hong Su-jong (PRK) | 15.700 | 13.350 | 13.275 | 13.750 | 56.075 |
| 24 | Kristina Pravdina (RUS) | 13.675 | 13.275 | 14.850 | 13.725 | 55.525 |

=== Vault ===
| Position | Gymnast | D Score | E Score | Penalty | Score 1 | D Score | E Score | Penalty | Score 2 | Total |
|---|---|---|---|---|---|---|---|---|---|---|
| 1st place, gold medalist(s) | Cheng Fei (CHN) | 5.8 | 9.625 | | 15.425 | 6.5 | 9.500 | | 16.000 | 15.712 |
| 2nd place, silver medalist(s) | Alicia Sacramone (USA) | 6.3 | 9.175 | | 15.475 | 5.8 | 9.375 | | 15.175 | 15.325 |
| 3rd place, bronze medalist(s) | Oksana Chusovitina (GER) | 6.3 | 8.975 | | 15.275 | 5.7 | 9.225 | | 14.925 | 15.100 |
| 4 | Laís Souza (BRA) | 5.8 | 9.325 | | 15.125 | 5.6 | 9.250 | | 14.850 | 14.987 |
| 5 | Anna Pavlova (RUS) | 5.8 | 9.300 | | 15.100 | 5.6 | 9.250 | | 14.850 | 14.975 |
| 6 | Elena Zamolodchikova (RUS) | 5.8 | 9.300 | | 15.100 | 5.6 | 9.225 | | 14.825 | 14.962 |
| 7 | Hong Su-jong (PRK) | 6.5 | 8.250 | | 14.750 | 6.5 | 8.150 | 0.1 | 14.550 | 14.650 |
| 8 | Sandra Izbașa (ROM) | 5.8 | 9.150 | | 14.950 | 5.0 | 9.175 | | 14.175 | 14.562 |

=== Uneven Bars ===
| Rank | Gymnast | A Score | B Score | Pen. | Total |
|---|---|---|---|---|---|
| 1st place, gold medalist(s) | Beth Tweddle (GBR) | 6.9 | 9.300 | | 16.200 |
| 2nd place, silver medalist(s) | Nastia Liukin (USA) | 6.9 | 9.150 | | 16.050 |
| 3rd place, bronze medalist(s) | Vanessa Ferrari (ITA) | 6.7 | 9.075 | | 15.775 |
| 4 | Mayu Kuroda (JPN) | 6.4 | 9.000 | | 15.400 |
| 5 | Jana Bieger (USA) | 6.4 | 8.150 | | 14.550 |
| 6 | Daria Joura (AUS) | 6.3 | 8.075 | | 14.375 |
| 7 | Steliana Nistor (ROM) | 6.8 | 7.175 | | 13.975 |
| 8 | Iryna Krasnianska (UKR) | 5.8 | 7.675 | | 13.475 |

=== Balance Beam ===
| Rank | Gymnast | A Score | B Score | Pen. | Total |
|---|---|---|---|---|---|
| 1st place, gold medalist(s) | Iryna Krasnianska (UKR) | 6.5 | 9.075 | | 15.575 |
| 2nd place, silver medalist(s) | Sandra Izbașa (ROM) | 6.4 | 9.100 | | 15.500 |
| 3rd place, bronze medalist(s) | Elyse Hopfner-Hibbs (CAN) | 6.3 | 9.175 | | 15.475 |
| 4 | Anna Pavlova (RUS) | 6.2 | 9.075 | | 15.275 |
| 4 | Zhang Nan (CHN) | 6.2 | 9.075 | | 15.275 |
| 6 | Vanessa Ferrari (ITA) | 6.3 | 8.375 | | 14.675 |
| 7 | Steliana Nistor (ROM) | 6.3 | 8.275 | | 14.575 |
| 8 | Olga Shcherbatykh (UKR) | 6.3 | 8.025 | | 14.325 |

=== Floor Exercise ===
| Rank | Gymnast | A Score | B Score | Pen. | Total |
|---|---|---|---|---|---|
| 1st place, gold medalist(s) | Cheng Fei (CHN) | 6.4 | 9.475 | | 15.875 |
| 2nd place, silver medalist(s) | Jana Bieger (USA) | 6.3 | 9.250 | | 15.550 |
| 3rd place, bronze medalist(s) | Vanessa Ferrari (ITA) | 6.1 | 9.350 | | 15.450 |
| 4 | Daiane dos Santos (BRA) | 6.4 | 9.025 | | 15.425 |
| 4 | Beth Tweddle (GBR) | 6.0 | 9.425 | | 15.425 |
| 6 | Sandra Izbașa (ROM) | 6.3 | 9.275 | 0.2 | 15.375 |
| 7 | Natasha Kelley (USA) | 6.1 | 9.200 | | 15.300 |
| 8 | Laís Souza (BRA) | 6.0 | 9.050 | 0.3 | 14.750 |

== Medal count ==
=== Overall ===
| Rank | Nation | Gold | Silver | Bronze | Total |
|---|---|---|---|---|---|
| 1 | China | 8 | 0 | 0 | 8 |
| 2 | Romania | 2 | 1 | 1 | 4 |
| 3 | Australia | 1 | 1 | 0 | 2 |
| 4 | Italy | 1 | 0 | 2 | 3 |
| 5 | Great Britain | 1 | 0 | 0 | 1 |
| 5 | Ukraine | 1 | 0 | 0 | 1 |
| 7 | United States | 0 | 5 | 1 | 6 |
| 8 | Japan | 0 | 2 | 1 | 3 |
| 9 | Russia | 0 | 1 | 1 | 2 |
| 10 | Belarus | 0 | 1 | 0 | 1 |
| 10 | Brazil | 0 | 1 | 0 | 1 |
| 10 | Bulgaria | 0 | 1 | 0 | 1 |
| 10 | Slovenia | 0 | 1 | 0 | 1 |
| 10 | South Korea | 0 | 1 | 0 | 1 |
| 15 | Germany | 0 | 0 | 3 | 3 |
| 16 | Canada | 0 | 0 | 2 | 2 |
| 17 | Greece | 0 | 0 | 1 | 1 |
| 17 | Netherlands | 0 | 0 | 1 | 1 |
| Totals (18 entries) | | 14 | 15 | 13 | 42 |

=== Men ===
| Rank | Nation | Gold | Silver | Bronze | Total |
|---|---|---|---|---|---|
| 1 | China | 5 | 0 | 0 | 5 |
| 2 | Romania | 2 | 0 | 0 | 2 |
| 3 | Australia | 1 | 1 | 0 | 2 |
| 4 | Japan | 0 | 2 | 1 | 3 |
| 5 | Belarus | 0 | 1 | 0 | 1 |
| 5 | Brazil | 0 | 1 | 0 | 1 |
| 5 | Bulgaria | 0 | 1 | 0 | 1 |
| 5 | Russia | 0 | 1 | 0 | 1 |
| 5 | Slovenia | 0 | 1 | 0 | 1 |
| 5 | South Korea | 0 | 1 | 0 | 1 |
| 11 | Germany | 0 | 0 | 2 | 2 |
| 12 | Canada | 0 | 0 | 1 | 1 |
| 12 | Greece | 0 | 0 | 1 | 1 |
| 12 | Netherlands | 0 | 0 | 1 | 1 |
| 12 | United States | 0 | 0 | 1 | 1 |
| Totals (15 entries) | | 8 | 9 | 7 | 24 |

=== Women ===
| Rank | Nation | Gold | Silver | Bronze | Total |
|---|---|---|---|---|---|
| 1 | China | 3 | 0 | 0 | 3 |
| 2 | Italy | 1 | 0 | 2 | 3 |
| 3 | Great Britain | 1 | 0 | 0 | 1 |
| 3 | Ukraine | 1 | 0 | 0 | 1 |
| 5 | United States | 0 | 5 | 0 | 5 |
| 6 | Romania | 0 | 1 | 1 | 2 |
| 7 | Canada | 0 | 0 | 1 | 1 |
| 7 | Germany | 0 | 0 | 1 | 1 |
| 7 | Russia | 0 | 0 | 1 | 1 |
| Totals (9 entries) | | 6 | 6 | 6 | 18 |
