= Canada men's national artistic gymnastics team =

Canada men's national gymnastics team
- Continental union: PAGU
- National federation: Gymnastics Canada

Olympic Games
- Appearances: 6

World Championships

Junior World Championships
- Appearances: 3

Commonwealth Games
- Appearances: 11
- Medals: Gold: 1978, 1990, 1994, 2006, 2026; Silver: 2002, 2018, 2022; Bronze: 1998, 2010, 2014

Pan American Championships
- Medals: Gold: 2026; Silver: 2010, 2023, 2025; Bronze: 2005, 2022

The Canada men's national artistic gymnastics team represents Canada in FIG international competitions.

== History ==
Canada has participated in the Olympic Games men's team competition six times, finishing as high as seventh place in 1984.

== Current roster ==
Name	Birthdate and age	Hometown
Matteo Bardana	17 August 2006 (age 20)	Kingston, Ontario
Jordan Carroll	25 January 2006 (age 20)	Saskatoon, Saskatchewan
Addyson Cheladyn	2000	New Westminster, British Columbia
René Cournoyer	23 April 1997 (age 29)	Repentigny, Quebec
Félix Dolci	5 May 2002 (age 24)	Laval, Quebec
William Émard	17 March 2000 (age 26)	Laval, Quebec
Owen Fielding		
Evan Huber	2006	Toronto, Ontario
Ethan Ikeda	November 23, 2004 (age 21)	
Chris Kaji	January 31, 2000 (age 26)	Oakville, Ontario
Aidan Li	December 22, 2002 (age 23)	Ottawa, Ontario
Xavier Olasz	December 5, 2005 (age 20)	Kingston, Ontario
Sam Rakita		
Jayson Rampersad	July 31, 2003 (age 23)	Mississauga, Ontario
Sam Zakutney	October 6, 1998 (age 28)	Ottawa, Ontario

== Team competition results ==
=== Olympic Games ===
Year	Position	Squad
1968	16th place	Barry Brooker, Roger Dion, Sid Jensen, Gilbert Larose, Steve Mitruk
1984	7th place	Warren Long, Allan Reddon, Brad Peters, Frank Nutzenberger, Philippe Chartrand, Daniel Gaudet
1988	9th place	Curtis Hibbert, Brad Peters, Lorne Bobkin, Alan Nolet, James Rozon, Philippe Chartrand
2004	11th place	Grant Golding, Ken Ikeda, Sasha Jeltkov, David Kikuchi, Kyle Shewfelt, Adam Wong
2008	9th place	Grant Golding, David Kikuchi, Kyle Shewfelt, Adam Wong, Brandon O'Neill, Nathan Gafuik
2024	8th place	Zachary Clay, René Cournoyer, Félix Dolci, William Émard, Samuel Zakutney

=== World Championships ===
Year	Position	Squad
2003	9th place	Grant Golding, Ken Ikeda, Richard Ikeda, Alexander Jeltkov, David Kikuchi, Casey Sandy, Kyle Shewfelt
2006	6th place	Nathan Gafuik, Ken Ikeda, David Kikuchi, Brandon O'Neill, Kyle Shewfelt, Adam Wong
2007	11th place	Nathan Gafuik, Grant Golding, Ken Ikeda, David Kikuchi, Brandon O'Neill, Casey Sandy
2010	14th place	Nathan Gafuik, Ken Ikeda, Jayd Lukenchuk, Kevin Lytwyn, Jackson Payne, Casey Sandy, Jay Hugh Smith
2011	12th place	Nathan Gafuik, Ken Ikeda, Jayd Lukenchuk, Kevin Lytwyn, Brandon O'Neill, Jackson Payne, Casey Sandy
2014	14th place	Zachary Clay, Ken Ikeda, Kevin Lytwyn, Scott Morgan, Jackson Payne, Jay Hugh Smith, Robert Watson
2015	15th place	René Cournoyer, Ken Ikeda, Anderson Loran, Kevin Lytwyn, Scott Morgan, Jay Hugh Smith
2018	18th place	Zachary Clay, René Cournoyer, Scott Morgan, Cory Paterson, Samuel Zakutney
2019	17th place	René Cournoyer, William Émard, Cory Paterson, Jackson Payne, Samuel Zakutney
2022	10th place	Zachary Clay, Félix Dolci, William Émard, Chris Kaji, Samuel Zakutney
2023	7th place	Zachary Clay, René Cournoyer, Félix Dolci, William Émard, Jayson Rampersad
2026	13th place	Jordan Carroll, René Cournoyer, Félix Dolci, Xavier Olasz, Samuel Zakutney, Ethan Ikeda

=== Junior World Championships ===
Year	Position	Squad
2019	5th place	Ioannis Chronopoulos, Félix Dolci, Evgeny Siminiuc
2023	13th place	Matteo Bardana, Victor Canuel, Xavier Olasz
2025	27th place	Aiden Gonzalez, Alec Ikeda, Edouard Nadeau

== Most decorated gymnasts ==
This list includes all Canadian male artistic gymnasts who have won a medal at the Olympic Games or the World Artistic Gymnastics Championships.

Rank	Gymnast	Team	AA	FX	PH	SR	VT	PB	HB	Olympic Total	World Total	Total
1	Kyle Shewfelt			2004; 2003; 2006			2003			1	3	4
2	Curtis Hibbert						1992		1987	0	2	2
3	Alexander Jeltkov								1999	0	1	1
3	Brandon O'Neill			2005						0	1	1

== See also ==
- Canada women's national artistic gymnastics team
