= Melody Hernandez =

Melody Hernandez may refer to:

- Melody Hernandez (gymnast)
- Melody Hernandez (politician)
