= Ashley Priess =

American artistic gymnast

- Full name: Ashley Elizabeth Priess–Johnston
- Born: March 8, 1990 (age 36)
- Height: 5 ft 3 in (160 cm)

Gymnastics career
- Discipline: Women's artistic gymnastics
- Country represented: United States
- College team: Alabama Crimson Tide
- Club: Cincinnati Gymnastics Academy
- Head coach: Mary Lee Tracy
Medal record
Representing the United States
World Championships
Silver medal – second place	2006 Aarhus	Team
Representing Alabama Crimson Tide
NCAA National Championships
Gold medal – first place	2012 Duluth	Team
Silver medal – second place	2009 Lincoln	Team
Bronze medal – third place	2010 Gainesville	Team
Bronze medal – third place	2013 Los Angeles	Team

Ashley Priess
Current position
- Title: Head coach
- Team: Alabama Crimson Tide
- Conference: SEC

Biographical details
- Education: University of Alabama

Coaching career (HC unless noted)
- 2018: Illinois Fighting Illini (Asst.)
- 2019–2021: Auburn Tigers (Asst.)
- 2022: Auburn Tigers (Associate HC)
- 2023–Present: Alabama Crimson Tide

Ashley Elizabeth Priess–Johnston (born March 8, 1990) is an American former artistic gymnast and the current head coach of the Alabama Crimson Tide gymnastics team. She won a silver medal with the American team at the 2006 World Championships. She competed for the Alabama Crimson Tide, winning two NCAA Championship team titles and receiving ten All-America honors.

== Gymnastics career ==
Priess began gymnastics at the age of three because her mother and sister were both gymnasts. She became age-eligible for senior elite competitions in 2006. At the 2006 Lyon World Cup, she won a gold medal on the balance beam and also won a bronze medal on the uneven bars. Then at the Ghent World Cup, she won a silver medal on the balance beam and a bronze medal on the floor exercise. She tied with Natasha Kelley for the all-around title at the 2006 U.S. Classic.

Priess was selected to compete at the 2006 World Championships. After falling off the balance beam in the qualification round, head coach Márta Károlyi removed her from the lineups in the team final. The United States won a silver medal in the team competition. Individually, she competed in the all-around final after teammate Chellsie Memmel withdrew and finished tenth.

Priess withdrew from the 2008 U.S. Championships and retired from elite competition due to ongoing back injuries. She joined the Alabama Crimson Tide women's gymnastics team for the 2009 season, following her older sister, who was also a member of the team. That year, she helped Alabama win the SEC Championships and place second at the 2009 NCAA Championships, where she individually finished third on the balance beam. At the 2010 NCAA Championships, she injured her ankle on the vault. She had surgery on both ankles and missed the 2011 season, where Alabama won its first NCAA gymnastics team title since 2002. She returned to competition for the 2012 season and helped Alabama successfully defend its NCAA title. She used a redshirt year to return for a fifth season in 2013, helping Alabama finish third at the 2013 NCAA Championships.

== Coaching career ==
Priess returned to Cincinnati Gymnastics Academy to begin her coaching career. She spent the 2018 season as an assistant coach for the Illinois Fighting Illini. She was then hired by the Auburn Tigers for the 2019 season. She spent four seasons at Auburn, including Auburn's 2022 fourth-place NCAA finish. On May 23, 2022, she was named Head Coach of Alabama Gymnastics.
