= Bobkin =

Bobkin is a surname. East Slavic feminine form: Bobkina. Notable people with the surname include:

- Lorne Bobkin, Canadian Olympic gymnast
- Leonid Bobkin, Soviet general
- Natalia Bobkina, Russian sumo female wrestler
- Oleksandr Bobkin, Ukrainian hockey player
