= Casey Sandy =

Canadian artistic gymnast

- Born: 21 May 1984 (age 42) Montreal, Quebec, Canada

Gymnastics career
- Discipline: Men's artistic gymnastics
- Country represented: Canada
- College team: Penn State Nittany Lions (2006–2009)
- Awards: Nissen-Emery Award (2009)

Casey Sandy (born 21 May 1984) is a Canadian gymnast who competed for Penn State from 2006 to 2009. In 2007, Sandy participated in the World Championships. In 2008, Sandy was the NCAA all-around national champion. He was discouraged by Canada from trying for a place on its 2008 Olympic team. In 2009, Sandy was the Canadian national champion. In that year, he also was awarded the Nissen-Emery award (the "Heisman" of men's gymnastics).

== Personal ==
Sandy was born in Montreal, Quebec, and has a sister. He is black.
