= Yevhen Bohonosiuk =

Ukrainian gymnast (born 1982)

- Євген Васильович Богоносюк
- Full name: Yevhen Vasylovych Bohonosiuk
- Alternative name: Ievgenii Bogonosiuk
- Born: 18 January 1982 (age 44) Kyiv, Ukrainian SSR, Soviet Union
- Height: 1.70 m (5 ft 7 in)

Gymnastics career
- Discipline: Men's artistic gymnastics
- Country represented: Ukraine
- Club: Ukraïna Kyiv

Yevhen Vasylovych Bohonosiuk (born 18 January 1982) is a Ukrainian gymnast. He competed at the 2004 Summer Olympics.

His son is United States junior national team member Sasha Bogonosiuk.
