= Adam Wong =

Canadian artistic gymnast

- Born: 29 March 1985 (age 41)

Gymnastics career
- Discipline: Men's artistic gymnastics
- Country represented: Canada

Adam Wong (born 29 March 1985) is a Canadian male artistic gymnast, representing his nation at international competitions. He participated at the 2004 Summer Olympics in Athens, Greece and at the 2008 Summer Olympics in Beijing, China. In the 2006 Commonwealth Games, he took first for floor. He participated in the 2006 World Championship finishing tied for ninth. He competed for Bonavista Energy Corp. and earned a silver medal in the team Obstacle Course at the 2018 Calgary Corporate Challenge.
