= Christoph Schärer =

Swiss artistic gymnast

Christoph Scharer
- Born: 14 August 1980 (age 46)

Gymnastics career
- Discipline: Men's artistic gymnastics
- Country represented: Switzerland (2001-2008)

Christoph Scharer (born 14 August 1980) is a Swiss male artistic gymnast, representing his nation at international competitions. He participated at the 2004 Summer Olympics and 2008 Summer Olympics He also competed at world championships, including the 2001 World Artistic Gymnastics Championships and 2005 World Artistic Gymnastics Championships.
