= Melody Hernandez (gymnast) =

Australian artistic gymnast

- Born: 30 October 1990 (age 35) Wollongong

Gymnastics career
- Discipline: Women's artistic gymnastics
- Country represented: Australia

Melody Hernandez (born 30 October 1990) is an Australian former artistic gymnast who competed at the 2006 World Artistic Gymnastics Championships.

== Biography ==
Hernandez started gymnastics in December 1996 and trained at Albion Park Oak Flats and the Australian Institute of Sport. She made the Australian team for the 2006 World Artistic Gymnastics Championships in Aarhus, Denmark. She suffered a serious leg injury 12 months prior to the World Championships. She was given the Athlete Award of Distinction by Gymnastics Australia.

In 2007, Melody placed 4th overall in the Australian Championships, after 3 top-ranked Australian gymnasts, one of which placed 5th overall at the 2006 world championships. After suffering a horrible injury on both her legs in 2005, Melody came back strongly and is currently still going strong, hoping to make the 2008 Beijing Olympics Team.
