= Marisela Arizmendi =

Mexican gymnast

Marisela Arizmedi Torres is a Mexican gymnast who won the bronze medal of artistic gymnastics at the 2007 Pan American Games in Brazil, but had it taken away after it was established that she had the certification for a gymnastics official rather than for a competitor.
