= Natasha Kelley =

American artistic gymnast

- Born: January 1, 1990 (age 36)

Gymnastics career
- Discipline: Women's artistic gymnastics
- Country represented: United States
- Club: Cypress Gymnastics
Medal record
Women's artistic gymnastics
Representing United States
World Championships
Silver medal – second place	2006 Aarhus	Team
American Cup
Silver medal – second place	2007 Jacksonville	All-Around

Natasha Kelley (born January 1, 1990, in Baton Rouge, Louisiana) is a former American artistic gymnast. Kelley was a member of the silver-medal-winning U.S. team at the 2006 World Championships, along with Chellsie Memmel, Alicia Sacramone, Jana Bieger, Nastia Liukin, and Ashley Priess.

== Early gymnastics and junior career ==
Kelley began her gymnastics career at Elite Gymnastics in Baton Rouge. She competed there for many years before moving to Brown's Gymnastics in Houston, Texas. She then moved again to Stars Gymnastics, also in Houston. She became a junior international elite in February 2004. In June of that year, she was named to the junior national team after finishing seventh at the Visa National Championships. In July, she made her international debut at the Olympiad Elite meet in Ensenada, Mexico, where she won the all-around competition. She went on to represent the United States at the Pan American Games, where she won gold medals on the vault, on the balance beam, and in the team competition, as well as a bronze in the all-around.

In 2005, Kelley won the junior national title in the all-around, on the balance beam, and on the floor exercise. She was invited to the biennial Japan Junior International competition in Yokohama, where she won the all-around and balance beam titles.

== Senior career ==
Kelley became a senior international elite in 2006. In her first major domestic competition as a senior, the U.S. Classic, she tied for first with Priess. At the 2006 National Championships, she finished second to Liukin in the all-around, on the uneven bars, and on the balance beam, securing her spot on the U.S. team for the World Championships in Aarhus, Denmark. There, she won a silver medal with the team and placed seventh in the floor exercise final, where she replaced an injured Memmel.

In 2007, Kelley was selected to compete at the American Cup, where she fell from the uneven bars but earned the highest balance beam score of the competition, ultimately finishing second behind U.S. teammate Shawn Johnson. She placed 10th at the National Championships while struggling with injuries and was subsequently left off the World Championships team. Shortly after nationals, she relocated to another Houston gym, Cypress Academy of Gymnastics. In November, she announced on her personal website that she had signed a letter of intent to compete for the University of Oklahoma beginning in the 2008-09 academic year.

Kelley's final elite competition was the 2007 Glasgow Grand Prix World Cup, where she tied for fifth place on the balance beam. Shortly before the 2008 National Championships, she announced her retirement from elite gymnastics.

== NCAA career ==
Kelley competed for the University of Oklahoma in the 2010 and 2011 seasons. She missed the 2009 season because of an Achilles tendon rupture. In 2010, despite suffering an anterior cruciate ligament injury in preseason training, she finished second with her team at the NCAA Women's Gymnastics Championships and was named Big 12 Newcomer of the Year. In 2011, she shared the Big 12 balance beam title with teammate Megan Ferguson and went on to earn first team All-America honors on that event at the NCAA Championship, where Oklahoma placed third.

Shortly after the start of the 2012 season, Kelley announced her retirement from collegiate gymnastics, citing a second Achilles tendon injury sustained in preseason training.
