= Ken Ikeda =

Canadian gymnast

- Full name: Kenneth Ikeda
- Born: 24 February 1982 (age 44) Kamloops, British Columbia, Canada

Gymnastics career
- Discipline: Men's artistic gymnastics
- Country represented: Canada

Kenneth Ikeda (born 24 February 1982) is a Canadian former gymnast. He competed in the team final at the 2004 Summer Olympics.
