= Brandon O'Neill (gymnast) =

Canadian artistic gymnast

- Born: 21 December 1984 (age 41)

Gymnastics career
- Discipline: Men's artistic gymnastics
- Country represented: Canada (2005)
Medal record
Men's artistic gymnastics
Representing Canada
World Championships
Silver medal – second place	2005 Melbourne	Floor exercise
World Cup Final
Bronze medal – third place	2006 São Paulo	Floor exercise
Pan American Games
Gold medal – first place	2003 Santo Domingo	Floor exercise
Pan American Championships
Gold medal – first place	2005 Rio de Janeiro	Floor exercise
Summer Universiade
Gold medal – first place	2005 İzmir	Floor exercise

Brandon O'Neill (born 21 December 1984) is a Canadian male artistic gymnast who represented his nation at international competitions. He competed at world championships, including the 2005 World Artistic Gymnastics Championships in Melbourne.
