= Gymnastics at the 2004 Summer Olympics – Men's artistic qualification =

These are the results of the men's qualification round, the preliminary round which decided the finalists for all eight events for men in artistic gymnastics at the 2004 Summer Olympics in Athens. The qualification round took place on August 14 at the Olympic Indoor Hall.

The top twelve teams from the 2003 World Artistic Gymnastics Championships completed for places in the team final. Each team was allowed to bring up to six gymnasts. During qualification, each team could have up to five gymnasts compete on each apparatus, and could count the four highest scores for the team total. The eight teams with the highest scores in the qualification round advanced to the team final.

Individual gymnasts, including those who were not part of a team, competed for places in the all-around and apparatus finals. The twenty-four gymnasts with the highest scores in the all-around advanced to that final, except that each country could only send two gymnasts to the all-around final. The eight gymnasts with the highest scores on each apparatus advanced to those finals, except that each country could only send two gymnasts to each apparatus final.

In total, 98 gymnasts from 32 countries competed in the qualification round.

== Results ==
Gymnast	Country	Floor Exercise		Pommel Horse		Rings		Vault		Parallel Bars		Horizontal Bar		Total (All-around)	
Gymnast	Country	Score	Rank	Score	Rank	Score	Rank	Score	Rank	Score	Rank	Score	Rank	Score	Rank
Japan		38.325	3	38.699	2	38.725	2	38.412	2	38.924	1	39.049	1	232.134	1
Hiroyuki Tomita	Japan	8.987	62	9.750	4	9.750	5	9.650	7	9.787	2	9.725	13	57.649	3
Isao Yoneda	Japan	9.725	4	8.450	76	9.625	27	9.637	10	9.687	15	9.800	1	56.924	10
Naoya Tsukahara	Japan	9.725	4	9.687	12	9.700	13	9.425	38	9.650	21	—	—	48.187	48
Takehiro Kashima	Japan	9.150	53	9.812	1	—	—	9.625	13	9.475	40	9.737	6	47.799	49
Hisashi Mizutori	Japan	—	—	9.450	35	9.650	23	9.500	26	—	—	9.737	6	38.337	68
Daisuke Nakano	Japan	9.725	4	—	—	9.012	65	—	—	9.800	1	9.775	2	38.312	69
United States		38.850	1	37.874	4	38.274	6	38.099	5	38.836	2	38.486	5	230.419	2
Paul Hamm	United States	9.725	4	9.737	6	9.512	44	9.575	18	9.762	4	9.750	4	58.061	1
Brett McClure	United States	9.437	36	9.000	61	9.037	64	9.512	23	9.675	19	9.662	25	56.323	19
Guard Young	United States	9.700	9	9.212	50	9.612	33	9.450	36	9.637	23	—	—	47.611	50
Blaine Wilson	United States	9.700	9	—	—	9.625	27	9.512	23	9.687	15	8.862	67	47.386	53
Morgan Hamm	United States	9.725	4	9.700	11	—	—	9.500	26	—	—	9.737	6	38.662	67
Jason Gatson	United States	—	—	9.225	49	9.525	43	—	—	9.712	10	9.337	49	37.799	73
Romania		38.574	2	38.474	3	38.249	7	38.261	3	38.312	6	38.149	7	230.019	3
Marian Drăgulescu	Romania	9.762	1	9.325	43	9.475	49	9.762	3	9.562	33	9.550	34	57.436	4
Ioan Silviu Suciu	Romania	9.650	17	9.712	9	9.487	48	9.637	10	9.500	39	9.412	46	57.398	6
Dan Potra	Romania	9.537	27	9.300	44	9.500	45	9.362	51	9.550	34	8.500	72	55.749	25
Răzvan Şelariu	Romania	9.625	22	—	—	9.700	13	9.500	26	9.150	56	9.512	40	47.487	52
Marius Urzică	Romania	—	—	9.812	1	—	—	—	—	9.700	12	9.675	24	29.187	80
Ilie Daniel Popescu	Romania	—	—	9.625	19	9.562	40	—	—	—	—	—	—	19.187	93
China		37.524	9	38.712	1	37.461	11	38.437	1	38.612	3	38.761	2	229.507	4
Yang Wei	China	9.412	40	9.525	27	9.712	10	9.550	19	9.625	24	9.550	34	57.374	7
Xing Aowei	China	9.637	19	9.650	16	8.925	68	9.600	16	—	—	9.687	20	47.499	51
Xiao Qin	China	9.125	56	9.337	41	—	—	9.237	58	9.525	38	9.750	4	46.974	55
Teng Haibin	China	9.350	44	9.800	3	—	—	9.487	31	6.775	81	9.687	20	45.099	64
Huang Xu	China	—	—	9.737	6	9.712	10	—	—	9.675	19	9.637	27	38.761	66
Li Xiaopeng	China	—	—	—	—	9.112	61	9.800	2	9.787	2	—	—	28.699	84
Ukraine		38.112	4	37.749	7	38.449	4	37.862	7	38.461	4	37.749	9	228.382	5
Roman Zozulya	Ukraine	9.487	31	9.562	25	9.725	9	9.337	53	9.712	10	9.450	45	57.273	8
Ruslan Myezyentsev	Ukraine	9.650	17	9.425	37	9.687	18	9.475	32	9.437	43	9.037	64	56.711	13
Vadym Kuvakin	Ukraine	9.475	32	9.337	41	9.600	35	9.500	26	8.912	65	—	—	46.824	56
Andriy Mykaylichenko	Ukraine	9.337	45	8.650	71	—	—	9.550	19	9.575	32	8.300	74	45.412	63
Yevhen Bohonosyuk	Ukraine	9.500	30	—	—	9.437	52	8.962	74	—	—	9.525	38	37.424	74
Valeriy Honcharov	Ukraine	—	—	9.425	37	—	—	—	—	9.737	7	9.737	6	28.899	81
Russia		37.636	8	36.824	11	38.799	1	38.199	4	38.386	5	38.136	8	227.980	6
Aleksei Bondarenko	Russia	9.662	15	8.650	71	9.662	22	9.825	1	9.537	35	9.600	31	56.936	9
Georgy Grebenkov	Russia	9.562	25	8.300	79	9.712	10	9.400	46	9.687	15	9.487	42	56.148	20
Maxim Deviatovski	Russia	8.950	65	9.237	47	9.675	19	8.975	73	9.462	41	9.312	52	55.611	26
Anton Golotsutskov	Russia	9.462	34	9.487	30	9.625	27	9.762	3	7.737	80	—	—	46.073	61
Aleksei Nemov	Russia	—	—	9.450	35	—	—	—	—	9.700	12	9.737	6	28.887	82
Aleksandr Safoshkin	Russia	—	—	—	—	9.750	5	9.212	60	—	—	—	—	18.962	95
South Korea		36.512	11	37.761	6	38.650	3	38.099	6	38.274	7	38.674	3	227.970	7
Yang Tae-Young	South Korea	9.700	9	9.625	19	9.625	27	9.650	7	9.587	30	9.737	6	57.924	2
Kim Dae-Eun	South Korea	9.437	36	9.537	26	9.700	13	9.600	16	9.075	61	9.462	44	56.811	11
Kim Seung-Il	South Korea	8.775	73	8.800	66	—	—	9.437	37	9.612	26	9.700	16	46.324	59
Kim Dong-Hwa	South Korea	—	—	9.462	33	9.700	13	9.325	54	—	—	9.525	38	38.012	70
Lee Sun-Sung	South Korea	—	—	9.137	55	9.625	27	—	—	9.425	45	9.712	15	37.899	71
Cho Seong-Min	South Korea	8.600	76	—	—	9.612	33	9.412	41	9.650	21	—	—	37.274	76
Germany		37.874	6	37.799	5	37.799	9	37.324	11	37.711	9	38.473	6	226.98	8
Fabian Hambüchen	Germany	9.637	19	9.075	59	8.537	74	9.475	32	9.600	28	9.737	6	56.061	21
Sergei Pfeifer	Germany	9.400	42	9.575	24	9.587	36	9.150	64	9.150	56	9.125	59	55.987	23
Sven Kwiatkowski	Germany	9.362	43	9.087	58	9.075	63	9.462	35	9.362	48	9.487	42	55.835	24
Robert Juckel	Germany	9.175	51	9.425	37	9.550	41	9.237	58	—	—	9.687	20	47.074	54
Matthias Fahrig	Germany	9.475	32	—	—	—	—	9.000	71	9.212	54	9.562	32	37.249	77
Thomas Andergassen	Germany	—	—	9.712	9	9.587	36	—	—	9.537	35	—	—	28.836	83
France		36.948	10	37.199	9	37.736	10	37.712	8	38.075	8	38.561	4	226.231	9
Benoît Caranobe	France	9.287	49	9.162	53	9.587	36	9.612	15	9.450	42	9.537	36	56.635	15
Dimitri Karbanenko	France	9.612	23	8.375	78	9.012	65	9.475	32	8.550	73	9.537	36	54.561	39
Florent Marée	France	9.212	50	—	—	9.387	53	9.375	48	9.150	56	9.687	20	46.811	57
Johan Mounard	France	8.525	77	9.050	60	—	—	9.187	61	9.725	8	9.637	27	46.124	60
Yann Cucherat	France	—	—	9.512	28	8.912	69	—	—	9.750	6	9.700	16	37.874	72
Pierre Yves Bény	France	8.837	68	9.475	31	9.750	5	9.250	57	—	—	—	—	37.312	75
Spain		38.049	5	37.537	8	38.237	8	37.586	9	36.124	12	35.762	12	223.295	10
Rafael Martínez	Spain	9.562	25	8.962	62	9.675	19	9.412	41	9.325	49	9.700	16	56.636	14
Alejandro Barrenechea	Spain	9.412	40	8.912	64	9.362	54	9.162	62	8.975	63	9.275	53	55.098	30
Oriol Combarros	Spain	9.325	46	9.650	16	9.625	27	9.375	48	8.637	72	8.050	77	54.662	37
Víctor Cano	Spain	9.150	53	9.750	4	9.575	39	9.087	68	8.475	74	7.950	78	53.987	40
Jesús Carballo	Spain	—	—	9.175	52	—	—	—	—	9.187	55	8.737	69	27.099	87
Gervasio Deferr	Spain	9.750	2	—	—	—	—	9.637	10	—	—	—	—	19.387	91
Canada		37.749	7	36.811	12	36.824	12	36.886	12	36.636	10	36.999	10	221.905	11
Adam Wong	Canada	9.325	46	9.237	47	9.112	61	9.137	65	9.262	53	9.087	61	55.160	29
Grant Golding	Canada	9.512	28	9.262	45	9.650	23	9.125	66	8.962	64	8.500	72	55.011	31
Alexander Jeltkov	Canada	9.175	51	7.600	81	8.562	72	8.900	77	8.787	68	9.625	29	52.649	45
David Kikuchi	Canada	8.825	69	9.412	40	9.500	45	—	—	9.625	24	9.075	62	46.437	58
Kyle Shewfelt	Canada	9.737	3	—	—	8.112	76	9.687	5	—	—	9.212	57	36.748	78
Ken Ikeda	Canada	—	—	8.900	65	—	—	8.937	75	8.687	70	—	—	26.524	89
Italy		36.036	12	37.174	10	38.374	5	37.386	10	36.349	11	36.112	11	221.431	12
Igor Cassina	Italy	8.650	75	9.600	21	9.162	58	8.987	72	8.675	71	9.775	2	54.849	34
Matteo Morandi	Italy	8.962	64	8.750	69	9.775	3	9.412	41	8.375	75	8.700	70	53.974	41
Enrico Pozzo	Italy	9.450	35	8.787	68	7.850	77	9.325	54	9.100	59	8.300	74	52.812	44
Alberto Busnari	Italy	8.812	70	9.637	18)	—	—	8.762	79	8.987	62	9.337	49	45.535	62
Matteo Angioletti	Italy	8.812	70	—	—	9.675	21	9.662	6	—	—	8.212	76	36.361	79
Jury Chechi	Italy	—	—	9.150	54	9.762	4	—	—	9.587	30	—	—	28.499	85
Yernar Yerimbetov	Kazakhstan	9.687	13	9.675	13	9.300	55	9.537	22	9.725	8	9.500	41	57.424	5
Pavel Gofman	Israel	9.437	36	9.475	31	9.462	50	9.375	48	9.612	26	9.362	47	56.723	12
Luis Felipe Vargas	Puerto Rico	9.037	60	9.675	13	9.500	45	9.425	38	9.325	49	9.625	29	56.587	16
Igors Vihrovs	Latvia	9.662	15	9.462	33	9.225	57	9.425	38	9.287	52	9.362	47	56.423	17
Eric López Ríos	Cuba	9.062	59	9.500	29	9.637	25	9.400	46	9.687	15	9.112	60	56.398	18
Ilia Giorgadze	Georgia	9.437	36	9.100	57	9.450	51	9.350	52	9.600	28	9.075	62	56.012	22
Andreas Schweizer	Switzerland	8.787	72	9.200	51	9.737	8	9.100	67	9.387	47	9.225	55	55.436	27
Abel Driggs Santos	Cuba	8.875	67	9.600	21	9.550	41	9.012	70	9.425	45	8.812	68	55.274	28
Jorge Giraldo	Colombia	9.137	55	8.437	77	9.237	56	9.412	41	9.437	43	9.337	49	54.997	32
Mosiah Rodrigues	Brazil	9.075	58	9.600	21	8.600	71	9.262	56	8.800	67	9.562	32	54.899	33
Rúnar Alexandersson	Iceland	8.700	74	9.737	6	9.162	58	8.887	78	9.312	51	9.000	65	54.798	35
Vlasios Maras	Greece	8.950	65	8.650	71	8.775	70	9.512	23	9.087	60	9.725	13	54.699	36
Ng Shu Wai	Malaysia	9.300	48	9.250	46	9.162	58	9.412	41	8.300	78	9.225	55	54.649	38
Denis Savenkov	Belarus	9.512	28	8.800	66	9.637	25	9.500	26	8.875	66	7.300	79	53.624	42
Filipe Bezugo	Portugal	8.987	62	8.525	75	8.962	67	8.925	76	8.262	79	9.262	54	52.923	43
Filip Yanev	Bulgaria	9.012	61	8.300	79	8.137	75	9.625	13	8.375	75	9.137	58	52.586	46
Wajdi Bouallègue	Tunisia	9.112	57	8.950	63	8.562	72	9.025	69	8.350	77	8.512	71	52.511	47
Ivan Ivankov	Belarus	—	—	9.675	13	9.700	13	—	—	9.762	4	9.700	16	38.837	65
Philippe Rizzo	Australia	—	—	8.700	70	—	—	—	—	9.700	12	8.950	66	27.350	86
Christoph Schärer	Switzerland	—	—	8.650	71	—	—	—	—	8.737	69	9.650	26	27.037	88
Yordan Yovchev	Bulgaria	9.700	9	—	—	9.812	2	—	—	—	—	—	—	19.512	90
Jevgēņijs Saproņenko	Latvia	9.637	19	—	—	—	—	9.650	7	—	—	—	—	19.287	92
Róbert Gál	Hungary	9.587	24	—	—	—	—	9.550	19	—	—	—	—	19.137	94
Ri Jong-Song	North Korea	9.675	14	—	—	—	—	9.162	62	—	—	—	—	18.837	96
Kim Hyon-Il	North Korea	—	—	9.112	56	—	—	—	—	9.537	35	—	—	18.649	97
Dimosthenis Tampakos	Greece	—	—	—	—	9.850	1	—	—	—	—	—	—	9.850	98

== Finalists ==
=== Team all-around ===
Rank	Team	Floor Exercise	Pommel Horse	Rings	Vault	Parallel Bars	Horizontal Bar	Total
1	Japan	38.325	38.699	38.725	38.412	38.924	39.049	232.134
2	United States	38.850	37.874	38.274	38.099	38.836	38.486	230.419
3	Romania	38.574	38.474	38.249	38.261	38.312	38.149	230.019
4	China	37.524	38.712	37.461	38.437	38.612	38.761	229.507
5	Ukraine	38.112	37.749	38.449	37.862	38.461	37.749	228.382
6	Russia	37.636	36.824	38.799	38.199	38.386	38.136	227.980
7	South Korea	36.512	37.761	38.650	38.099	38.274	38.674	227.970
8	Germany	37.874	37.799	37.799	37.324	37.711	38.473	226.980

=== Individual all-around ===
Rank	Gymnast	Floor Exercise	Pommel Horse	Rings	Vault	Parallel Bars	Horizontal Bar	Total
1	Paul Hamm (USA)	9.725	9.737	9.512	9.575	9.762	9.750	58.061
2	Yang Tae-Young (KOR)	9.700	9.625	9.625	9.650	9.587	9.737	57.924
3	Hiroyuki Tomita (JPN)	8.987	9.750	9.750	9.650	9.787	9.725	57.649
4	Marian Drăgulescu (ROU)	9.762	9.325	9.475	9.762	9.562	9.550	57.436
5	Yernar Yerimbetov (KAZ)	9.687	9.675	9.300	9.537	9.725	9.500	57.424
6	Ioan Silviu Suciu (ROU)	9.650	9.712	9.487	9.637	9.500	9.412	57.398
7	Yang Wei (CHN)	9.412	9.525	9.712	9.550	9.625	9.550	57.374
8	Roman Zozulya (UKR)	9.487	9.562	9.725	9.337	9.712	9.450	57.273
9	Aleksei Bondarenko (RUS)	9.662	8.650	9.662	9.825	9.537	9.600	56.936
10	Isao Yoneda (JPN)	9.725	8.450	9.625	9.637	9.687	9.800	56.924
11	Kim Dae-Eun (KOR)	9.437	9.537	9.700	9.600	9.075	9.462	56.811
12	Pavel Gofman (ISR)	9.437	9.475	9.462	9.375	9.612	9.362	56.723
13	Ruslan Myezyentsev (UKR)	9.650	9.425	9.687	9.475	9.437	9.037	56.711
14	Rafael Martínez (ESP)	9.562	8.962	9.675	9.412	9.325	9.700	56.636
15	Benoît Caranobe (FRA)	9.287	9.162	9.587	9.612	9.450	9.537	56.635
16	Luis Felipe Vargas (PUR)	9.037	9.675	9.500	9.425	9.325	9.625	56.587
17	Igors Vihrovs (LAT)	9.662	9.462	9.225	9.425	9.287	9.362	56.423
18	Eric López Ríos (CUB)	9.062	9.500	9.637	9.400	9.687	9.112	56.398
19	Brett McClure (USA)	9.437	9.000	9.037	9.512	9.675	9.662	56.323
20	Georgy Grebenkov (RUS)	9.562	8.300	9.712	9.400	9.687	9.487	56.148
21	Fabian Hambüchen (GER)	9.637	9.075	8.537	9.475	9.600	9.737	56.061
22	Ilia Giorgadze (GEO)	9.437	9.100	9.450	9.350	9.600	9.075	56.012
23	Sergei Pfeifer (GER)	9.400	9.575	9.587	9.150	9.150	9.125	55.987
27	Andreas Schweizer (SUI)	8.787	9.200	9.737	9.100	9.387	9.225	55.436

=== Floor ===
Rank	Gymnast	Score
1	Marian Drăgulescu (ROU)	9.762
2	Gervasio Deferr (ESP)	9.750
3	Kyle Shewfelt (CAN)	9.737
4	Daisuke Nakano (JPN)	9.725
4	Isao Yoneda (JPN)	9.725
4	Morgan Hamm (USA)	9.725
4	Paul Hamm (USA)	9.725
8	Yordan Yovchev (BUL)	9.700

=== Pommel horse ===
Rank	Gymnast	Score
1	Takehiro Kashima (JPN)	9.812
1	Marius Urzică (ROU)	9.812
3	Teng Haibin (CHN)	9.800
4	Víctor Cano (ESP)	9.750
4	Hiroyuki Tomita (JPN)	9.750
6	Huang Xu (CHN)	9.737
6	Rúnar Alexandersson (ISL)	9.737
6	Paul Hamm (USA)	9.737

=== Rings ===
Rank	Gymnast	Score
1	Dimosthenis Tampakos (GRE)	9.850
2	Yordan Yovchev (BUL)	9.812
3	Matteo Morandi (ITA)	9.775
4	Jury Chechi (ITA)	9.762
5	Pierre Yves Bény (FRA)	9.750
5	Hiroyuki Tomita (JPN)	9.750
5	Aleksandr Safoshkin (RUS)	9.750
8	Andreas Schweizer (SUI)	9.737

=== Vault ===
Rank	Gymnast	Score
1	Aleksei Bondarenko (RUS)	9.825
2	Li Xiaopeng (CHN)	9.800
3	Marian Drăgulescu (ROU)	9.762
5	Kyle Shewfelt (CAN)	9.687
7	Jevgēņijs Saproņenko (LAT)	9.650
10	Gervasio Deferr (ESP)	9.637
13	Filip Yanev (BUL)	9.625
19	Róbert Gál (HUN)	9.550

=== Parallel bars ===
Rank	Gymnast	Score
1	Daisuke Nakano (JPN)	9.800
2	Li Xiaopeng (CHN)	9.787
2	Hiroyuki Tomita (JPN)	9.787
4	Ivan Ivankov (BLR)	9.762
4	Paul Hamm (USA)	9.762
6	Yann Cucherat (FRA)	9.750
7	Valeri Goncharov (UKR)	9.737
8	Yernar Yerimbetov (KAZ)	9.725

=== Horizontal bar ===
Rank	Gymnast	Score
1	Isao Yoneda (JPN)	9.800
2	Igor Cassina (ITA)	9.775
2	Daisuke Nakano (JPN)	9.775
4	Xiao Qin (CHN)	9.750
4	Paul Hamm (USA)	9.750
6	Fabian Hambüchen (GER)	9.737
6	Yang Tae-Young (KOR)	9.737
6	Aleksei Nemov (RUS)	9.737
6	Valeri Goncharov (UKR)	9.737
6	Morgan Hamm (USA)	9.737
