= 1999–2000 FIG Artistic Gymnastics World Cup series =

International gymnastics competition series

The 1999–2000 FIG Artistic Gymnastics World Cup series was a series of stages where events in men's and women's artistic gymnastics were contested. The series was a two-year long competition culminating at a final event, the World Cup Final in 2000. A number of qualifier stages were held. The top 3 gymnast in each apparatus at the qualifier events would receive medals and prize money. Gymnasts who finished in the top 8 would also receive points that would be added up to a ranking which would qualify individual gymnasts for the biennial World Cup Final.

== Stages ==
For the first time, the World Championships was part of the World Cup series. One extra event was held in December 2000, the Stuttgart World Cup, after the World Cup Final in Glasgow; this extra stage, however, was officially considered part of the 2001–2002 FIG Artistic Gymnastics World Cup series.

Year	Event	Location
1999	World Cup qualifier	Busan, South Korea
1999	World Championships / World Cup qualifier	Tianjin, China
1999	World Cup qualifier	Glasgow, Scotland
1999	World Cup qualifier	Zürich, Switzerland
1999	World Cup qualifier	Stuttgart, Germany
2000	World Cup qualifier	Montreux, France
2000	World Cup qualifier	Cottbus, (Germany)
2000	World Cup qualifier	Glasgow, Scotland
2000	World Cup qualifier (MAG only)	Ljubljana, Slovenia
2000	World Cup Final	Glasgow, Scotland

== Medalists ==
=== Men ===
Competition	Event	Gold	Silver	Bronze
Busan (1999)	Floor exercise	(China) Xiao Junfeng	(Spain) Gervasio Deferr	(Belarus) Vitaly Rudnitski
Busan (1999)	Pommel horse	(China) Xing Aowei	(Russia) Nikolai Kryukov	(Germany) Valery Belenky
Busan (1999)	Rings	(Hungary) Szilveszter Csollány	(Germany) Valery Belenky	(Russia) Alexei Bondarenko
Busan (1999)	Vault	(Poland) Leszek Blanik	(South Korea) Yeo Hong-chul	(Kazakhstan) Sergei Fedorchenko
Busan (1999)	Parallel bars	(Russia) Alexei Bondarenko	(South Korea) Lee Joo-hyung	(China) Huang Xu
Busan (1999)	Horizontal bar	(Ukraine) Alexander Beresch	(Finland) Jani Tanskanen	(South Korea) Kim Dong-hua
Tianjin (1999 World Championships)	Floor exercise	(Russia) Alexei Nemov	(Spain) Gervasio Deferr	(China) Xing Aowei
Tianjin (1999 World Championships)	Pommel horse	(Russia) Alexei Nemov	(Romania) Marius Urzică	(Russia) Nikolai Kryukov
Tianjin (1999 World Championships)	Rings	(China) Dong Zhen	(Hungary) Szilveszter Csollány	(Greece) Dimosthenis Tampakos
Tianjin (1999 World Championships)	Vault	(China) Li Xiaopeng	(Latvia) Jevgēņijs Saproņenko	(Switzerland) Dieter Rehm
Tianjin (1999 World Championships)	Parallel bars	(South Korea) Lee Joo-hyung	(Russia) Alexei Bondarenko (Japan) Naoya Tsukahara	—N/a
Tianjin (1999 World Championships)	Horizontal bar	(Spain) Jesús Carballo	(Canada) Alexander Jeltkov	(China) Yang Wei
Glasgow (1999)	Floor exercise	(Bulgaria) Yordan Yovchev	(Spain) Gervasio Deferr	(Romania) Marian Drăgulescu
Glasgow (1999)	Pommel horse	(Romania) Marius Urzică	(Hungary) Zoltán Supola	(United Kingdom) Lee McDermott
Glasgow (1999)	Rings	(Hungary) Szilveszter Csollány	(Bulgaria) Yordan Yovchev	(Germany) Andreas Wecker
Glasgow (1999)	Vault	(Spain) Gervasio Deferr	(Kazakhstan) Sergei Fedorchenko	(Romania) Marian Drăgulescu
Glasgow (1999)	Parallel bars	(Spain) Jesús Carballo	(Slovenia) Aljaž Pegan	(Russia) Alexei Bondarenko
Glasgow (1999)	Horizontal bar	(Spain) Jesús Carballo	(Slovenia) Aljaž Pegan	(Ukraine) Alexander Beresch
Zurich (1999)	Floor exercise	(Russia) Alexei Nemov	(Spain) Gervasio Deferr	(Denmark) Kasper Fardan
Zurich (1999)	Pommel horse	(Russia) Alexei Nemov	(Ukraine) Alexander Beresch	(Germany) Andreas Wecker
Zurich (1999)	Rings	(Hungary) Szilveszter Csollány	(Bulgaria) Yordan Yovchev	(China) Yang Wei
Zurich (1999)	Vault	(Russia) Alexei Bondarenko	(Latvia) Jevgēņijs Saproņenko	(Poland) Leszek Blanik
Zurich (1999)	Parallel bars	(Switzerland) Dieter Rehm	(South Korea) Lee Joo-hyung	(China) Xing Aowei
Zurich (1999)	Horizontal bar	(Ukraine) Alexander Beresch	(Germany) Andreas Wecker	(Bulgaria) Christian Ivanov
Stuttgart (1999)	Floor exercise	(Russia) Aleksei Nemov	(Latvia) Igors Vihrovs	(Spain) Gervasio Deferr
Stuttgart (1999)	Pommel horse	(Romania) Marius Urzică	(Russia) Alexei Nemov	(Ukraine) Alexander Beresch
Stuttgart (1999)	Rings	(Hungary) Szilveszter Csollány	(Bulgaria) Yordan Yovchev	(Germany) Andreas Wecker
Stuttgart (1999)	Vault	(Spain) Gervasio Deferr	(Russia) Nikolai Kryukov	(Russia) Alexei Bondarenko
Stuttgart (1999)	Parallel bars	(South Korea) Lee Joo-hyung	(Slovenia) Mitja Petkovšek	(Slovenia) Aljaž Pegan (Russia) Alexei Bondarenko
Stuttgart (1999)	Horizontal bar	(Germany) Andreas Wecker	(Slovenia) Aljaž Pegan	(China) Yang Wei
Montreux (2000)	Floor exercise	(Bulgaria) Yordan Yovchev (Russia) Alexei Nemov	—N/a	(Belarus) Vitaly Rudnitski
Montreux (2000)	Pommel horse	(Romania) Marius Urzică	(France) Eric Casimir	(Belarus) Ivan Ivankov
Montreux (2000)	Rings	(Belarus) Ivan Ivankov	(Hungary) Szilveszter Csollány	(Bulgaria) Yordan Yovchev
Montreux (2000)	Vault	(China) Xiao Junfeng	(Spain) Gervasio Deferr	(Poland) Leszek Blanik
Montreux (2000)	Parallel bars	(China) Huang Xu	(Kazakhstan) Aleksey Dmitrienko	(Belarus) Ivan Ivankov
Montreux (2000)	Horizontal bar	(Italy) Alberto Busnari	(Russia) Alexei Nemov	(Finland) Jani Tanskanen
Cottbus (2000)	Floor exercise	(Belarus) Vitaly Rudnitski	(Romania) Marian Drăgulescu	(Russia) Alexei Nemov
Cottbus (2000)	Pommel horse	(Romania) Marius Urzică	(Belarus) Ivan Ivankov	(France) Eric Poujade
Cottbus (2000)	Rings	(Hungary) Szilveszter Csollány	(Belarus) Ivan Ivankov	(Greece) Dimosthenis Tampakos
Cottbus (2000)	Vault	(Latvia) Jevgēņijs Saproņenko	(China) Xiao Junfeng	(Spain) Gervasio Deferr
Cottbus (2000)	Parallel bars	(Germany) Andreas Wecker	(Slovenia) Mitja Petkovšek	(Slovenia) Aljaž Pegan
Cottbus (2000)	Horizontal bar	(Canada) Alexander Jeltkov	(Ukraine) Alexander Beresch	(Belarus) Ivan Ivankov
Glasgow (2000)	Floor exercise	(Russia) Alexei Nemov	(Bulgaria) Yordan Yovchev	(Canada) Kyle Shewfelt
Glasgow (2000)	Pommel horse	(Romania) Marius Urzică	(Iceland) Rúnar Alexandersson	(France) Eric Poujade
Glasgow (2000)	Rings	(Hungary) Szilveszter Csollány	(Belarus) Ivan Ivankov	(Bulgaria) Yordan Yovchev
Glasgow (2000)	Vault	(China) Xiao Junfeng	(Poland) Leszek Blanik	(Ukraine) Valeri Pereshkura
Glasgow (2000)	Parallel bars	(Slovenia) Mitja Petkovšek (Belarus) Ivan Ivankov	—N/a	(China) Huang Xu
Glasgow (2000)	Horizontal bar	(Belarus) Ivan Ivankov	(Slovenia) Aljaž Pegan	(Hungary) Zoltán Supola
Ljubljana (2000)	Floor exercise	(Latvia) Igors Vihrovs	(Spain) Gervasio Deferr	(Ukraine) Valeri Pereshkura
Ljubljana (2000)	Pommel horse	(Iceland) Rúnar Alexandersson	(Spain) Víctor Cano	(Hungary) Zoltán Supola
Ljubljana (2000)	Rings	(Hungary) Szilveszter Csollány	(Germany) Marius Tobă	(Switzerland) Andreas Schweizer
Ljubljana (2000)	Vault	(Latvia) Jevgēņijs Saproņenko	(Ukraine) Valeri Pereshkura	(Denmark) Daniel Aunvig
Ljubljana (2000)	Parallel bars	(Slovenia) Mitja Petkovšek	(Bulgaria) Christian Ivanov	(Ukraine) Valeri Pereshkura
Ljubljana (2000)	Horizontal bar	(Canada) Alexander Jeltkov	(Slovenia) Aljaž Pegan	(Bulgaria) Christian Ivanov
Glasgow (2000 World Cup Final)	Floor exercise	(Spain) Gervasio Deferr	(Canada) Kyle Shewfelt (Bulgaria) Yordan Yovchev	—N/a
Glasgow (2000 World Cup Final)	Pommel horse	(Romania) Marius Urzică	(Belarus) Ivan Ivankov	(China) Xing Aowei
Glasgow (2000 World Cup Final)	Rings	(Hungary) Szilveszter Csollány	(Bulgaria) Yordan Yovchev	(Belarus) Ivan Ivankov
Glasgow (2000 World Cup Final)	Vault	(Romania) Marian Drăgulescu	(Spain) Gervasio Deferr	(Latvia) Jevgēņijs Saproņenko
Glasgow (2000 World Cup Final)	Parallel bars	(Slovenia) Mitja Petkovšek	(Russia) Alexei Bondarenko	(Slovenia) Aljaž Pegan (South Korea) Lee Joo-hyung
Glasgow (2000 World Cup Final)	Horizontal bar	(Ukraine) Alexander Beresch	(Slovenia) Aljaž Pegan	(Canada) Alexander Jeltkov

=== Women ===
Competition	Event	Gold	Silver	Bronze
Busan (1999)	Vault	(Russia) Elena Produnova	(Romania) Simona Amânar	(Romania) Andreea Răducan
Busan (1999)	Uneven bars	(China) Ling Jie	(Russia) Svetlana Khorkina	(Romania) Simona Amânar
Busan (1999)	Balance beam	(China) Dong Fangxiao	(China) Ling Jie	(Ukraine) Tatiana Yarosh
Busan (1999)	Floor exercise	(Russia) Svetlana Khorkina	(Romania) Andreea Răducan	(China) Huang Mandan
Tianjin (1999 World Championships)	Vault	(Russia) Elena Zamolodchikova	(Romania) Simona Amânar	(Romania) Maria Olaru
Tianjin (1999 World Championships)	Uneven bars	(Russia) Svetlana Khorkina	(China) Huang Mandan	(China) Ling Jie
Tianjin (1999 World Championships)	Balance beam	(China) Ling Jie	(Romania) Andreea Răducan	(Ukraine) Olga Roschupkina
Tianjin (1999 World Championships)	Floor exercise	(Romania) Andreea Răducan	(Romania) Simona Amânar	(Russia) Svetlana Khorkina
Glasgow (1999)	Vault	(Russia) Elena Zamolodchikova	(Romania) Simona Amânar	(Russia) Elena Produnova
Glasgow (1999)	Uneven bars	(Russia) Svetlana Khorkina	(Russia) Elena Produnova	(Ukraine) Viktoria Karpenko
Glasgow (1999)	Balance beam	(Romania) Andreea Răducan	(Ukraine) Viktoria Karpenko	(Russia) Elena Produnova
Glasgow (1999)	Floor exercise	(Russia) Elena Produnova	(Romania) Simona Amânar	(Romania) Andreea Răducan
Zurich (1999)	Vault	(Romania) Simona Amânar	(Romania) Andreea Răducan	(Russia) Elena Produnova
Zurich (1999)	Uneven bars	(Russia) Svetlana Khorkina	(Ukraine) Viktoria Karpenko	(Romania) Andreea Răducan (Australia) Allana Slater (Russia) Elena Produnova
Zurich (1999)	Balance beam	(Russia) Elena Produnova	(Ukraine) Viktoria Karpenko	(Romania) Andreea Răducan
Zurich (1999)	Floor exercise	(Romania) Andreea Răducan	(Romania) Simona Amânar	(Russia) Elena Produnova
Stuttgart (1999)	Vault	(Russia) Elena Zamolodchikova	(Russia) Elena Produnova	(United Kingdom) Lisa Mason
Stuttgart (1999)	Uneven bars	(Russia) Svetlana Khorkina	(Ukraine) Viktoria Karpenko	(China) Ling Jie
Stuttgart (1999)	Balance beam	(Ukraine) Viktoria Karpenko	(Russia) Svetlana Khorkina	(Australia) Trudy McIntosh
Stuttgart (1999)	Floor exercise	(Russia) Svetlana Khorkina (Ukraine) Viktoria Karpenko	—N/a	(Germany) Lisa Brüggemann
Montreux (2000)	Vault	(Russia) Elena Zamolodchikova	(Mexico) Denisse López	(Australia) Trudy McIntosh
Montreux (2000)	Uneven bars	(Russia) Svetlana Khorkina	(Ukraine) Viktoria Karpenko	(France) Elvire Teza
Montreux (2000)	Balance beam	(China) Liu Xuan	(Romania) Andreea Răducan	(Ukraine) Olga Roschupkina
Montreux (2000)	Floor exercise	(Russia) Svetlana Khorkina	(Romania) Andreea Răducan	(Romania) Simona Amânar
Cottbus (2000)	Vault	(Mexico) Denisse López	(Romania) Simona Amânar	(Russia) Elena Produnova
Cottbus (2000)	Uneven bars	(Ukraine) Viktoria Karpenko	(Russia) Svetlana Khorkina	(China) Liu Xuan
Cottbus (2000)	Balance beam	(Russia) Svetlana Khorkina	(Romania) Andreea Răducan	(Ukraine) Viktoria Karpenko
Cottbus (2000)	Floor exercise	(Russia) Elena Produnova	(Romania) Simona Amânar	(Belarus) Alena Polozkova
Glasgow (2000)	Vault	(Russia) Elena Produnova	(Czech Republic) Jana Komrsková	(Kazakhstan) Irina Evdokimova
Glasgow (2000)	Uneven bars	(Ukraine) Viktoria Karpenko	(China) Huang Mandan	(Russia) Elena Produnova
Glasgow (2000)	Balance beam	(Russia) Svetlana Khorkina	(Australia) Trudy McIntosh	(Australia) Allana Slater
Glasgow (2000)	Floor exercise	(Russia) Elena Produnova	(China) Dong Fangxiao	(Russia) Svetlana Khorkina
Glasgow (2000 World Cup Final)	Vault	(Russia) Elena Zamolodchikova	(Romania) Simona Amânar	(Poland) Joanna Skowrońska
Glasgow (2000 World Cup Final)	Uneven bars	(China) Ling Jie	(Australia) Allana Slater	(Romania) Andreea Răducan
Glasgow (2000 World Cup Final)	Balance beam	(Romania) Andreea Răducan	(Romania) Simona Amânar	(China) Ling Jie
Glasgow (2000 World Cup Final)	Floor exercise	(Romania) Andreea Răducan	(Russia) Elena Zamolodchikova	(China) Dong Fangxiao (Romania) Simona Amânar

=== Medal table ===
==== Overall ====
Rank	Nation	Gold	Silver	Bronze	Total
1	Russia	30	12	15	57
2	Romania	13	18	11	42
3	China	12	5	14	31
4	Hungary	8	3	2	13
5	Ukraine	7	8	10	25
6	Spain	6	8	2	16
7	Belarus	4	4	7	15
8	Slovenia	3	8	3	14
9	Latvia	3	3	1	7
10	Bulgaria	2	7	4	13
11	Germany	2	3	5	10
12	South Korea	2	3	2	7
13	Canada	2	2	2	6
14	Poland	1	1	3	5
15	Iceland	1	1	0	2
15	Mexico	1	1	0	2
17	Switzerland	1	0	2	3
18	Italy	1	0	0	1
19	Australia	0	2	4	6
20	Kazakhstan	0	2	2	4
21	France	0	1	3	4
22	Finland	0	1	1	2
23	Czech Republic	0	1	0	1
23	Japan	0	1	0	1
25	Denmark	0	0	2	2
25	Great Britain	0	0	2	2
25	Greece	0	0	2	2
Totals (27 entries)		99	95	99	293

==== Men ====
Rank	Nation	Gold	Silver	Bronze	Total
1	Russia	9	6	6	21
2	Hungary	8	3	2	13
3	Romania	7	2	2	11
4	China	7	1	8	16
5	Spain	6	8	2	16
6	Belarus	4	4	6	14
7	Slovenia	3	8	3	14
8	Ukraine	3	3	5	11
9	Latvia	3	3	1	7
10	Bulgaria	2	7	4	13
11	Germany	2	3	4	9
12	South Korea	2	3	2	7
13	Canada	2	2	2	6
14	Poland	1	1	2	4
15	Iceland	1	1	0	2
16	Switzerland	1	0	2	3
17	Italy	1	0	0	1
18	Kazakhstan	0	2	1	3
19	France	0	1	2	3
20	Finland	0	1	1	2
21	Japan	0	1	0	1
22	Denmark	0	0	2	2
22	Greece	0	0	2	2
24	Great Britain	0	0	1	1
Totals (24 entries)		62	60	60	182

==== Women ====
Rank	Nation	Gold	Silver	Bronze	Total
1	Russia	21	6	9	36
2	Romania	6	16	9	31
3	China	5	4	6	15
4	Ukraine	4	5	5	14
5	Mexico	1	1	0	2
6	Australia	0	2	4	6
7	Czech Republic	0	1	0	1
8	Belarus	0	0	1	1
8	France	0	0	1	1
8	Germany	0	0	1	1
8	Great Britain	0	0	1	1
8	Kazakhstan	0	0	1	1
8	Poland	0	0	1	1
Totals (13 entries)		37	35	39	111

== See also ==
- 1999–2000 FIG Rhythmic Gymnastics World Cup series
