= 2003–2004 FIG Artistic Gymnastics World Cup series =

International gymnastics competition series

The 2003–2004 FIG Artistic Gymnastics World Cup series was a series of stages where events in men's and women's artistic gymnastics were contested. The series was a two-year long competition culminating at a final event, the World Cup Final in 2004. A number of qualifier stages were held. The top 3 gymnast in each apparatus at the qualifier events would receive medals and prize money. Gymnasts who finished in the top 8 would also receive points that would be added up to a ranking which would qualify individual gymnasts for the biennial World Cup Final.

== Stages ==
Year	Event	Location
2003	World Cup qualifier	Thessaloniki, Greece
2003	World Cup qualifier	Paris, France
2003	World Cup qualifier	Cottbus, Germany
2003	World Cup qualifier	Glasgow, Scotland
2003	World Cup qualifier	Stuttgart, (Germany)
2004	World Cup qualifier	Cottbus, (Germany)
2004	World Cup qualifier	Lyon, France
2004	World Cup qualifier	Rio de Janeiro, Brazil
2004	World Cup qualifier	La Serena, Chile
2004	World Cup qualifier	Glasgow, Scotland
2004	World Cup qualifier	Ghent, Belgium
2004	World Cup qualifier	Stuttgart, (Germany)
2004	World Cup Final	Birmingham, England

== Medalists ==
=== Men ===
Competition	Event	Gold	Silver	Bronze
Thessaloniki (2003)	Floor exercise	(Bulgaria) Yordan Yovchev	(Latvia) Jevgēņijs Saproņenko	(Ukraine) Roman Zozulya
Thessaloniki (2003)	Pommel horse	(Romania) Marius Urzică	(Russia) Nikolai Krykov	(Hungary) Levente Fekete
Thessaloniki (2003)	Rings	(Greece) Dimosthenis Tampakos	(Bulgaria) Yordan Yovchev	(Italy) Matteo Morandi
Thessaloniki (2003)	Vault	(Latvia) Jevgēņijs Saproņenko	(Denmark) Kasper Fardan	(Greece) Ioannis Melissanidis
Thessaloniki (2003)	Parallel bars	(Romania) Marius Urzică	(Ukraine) Roman Zozulya	(China) Li Dezhi
Thessaloniki (2003)	Horizontal bar	(Ukraine) Alexander Beresh	(Slovenia) Aljaž Pegan	(Greece) Vlasios Maras
Paris (2003)	Floor exercise	(Bulgaria) Yordan Yovchev	(United States) Guard Young	(Latvia) Igors Vihrovs
Paris (2003)	Pommel horse	(Romania) Marius Urzică	(France) Éric Casimir	(Romania) Ioan Silviu Suciu
Paris (2003)	Rings	(Netherlands) Yuri van Gelder	(Bulgaria) Yordan Yovchev	(Italy) Andrea Coppolino
Paris (2003)	Vault	(Romania) Ioan Silviu Suciu	(Hungary) Róbert Gál	(Belarus) Dmitry Kasperovich
Paris (2003)	Parallel bars	(Romania) Marius Urzică (Slovenia) Mitja Petkovšek	—N/a	(Kazakhstan) Yernar Yerimbetov
Paris (2003)	Horizontal bar	(Australia) Philippe Rizzo (Ukraine) Alexander Beresh	—N/a	(Russia) Alexei Bondarenko
Cottbus (2003)	Floor exercise	(Hungary) Róbert Gál	(Ukraine) Roman Zozulya	(Romania) Ioan Silviu Suciu
Cottbus (2003)	Pommel horse	(Romania) Marius Urzică	(China) Liang Fuliang	(Romania) Ioan Silviu Suciu
Cottbus (2003)	Rings	(Bulgaria) Yordan Yovchev	(Ukraine) Roman Zozulya	(Greece) Dimosthenis Tampakos
Cottbus (2003)	Vault	(Egypt) Raouf Abdelraouf	(Russia) Anton Golotsutskov	(Ukraine) Ruslan Mezentsev
Cottbus (2003)	Parallel bars	(France) Yann Cucherat	(Kazakhstan) Yernar Yerimbetov	(China) Liang Fuliang
Cottbus (2003)	Horizontal bar	(Slovenia) Aljaž Pegan	(France) Cédric Guille	(Austria) Marco Baldauf
Glasgow (2003)	Floor exercise	(Canada) Kyle Shewfelt	(Latvia) Igors Vihrovs	(Romania) Marian Drăgulescu
Glasgow (2003)	Pommel horse	(Romania) Marius Urzică	(Japan) Takehiro Kashima (Romania) Ioan Silviu Suciu	—N/a
Glasgow (2003)	Rings	(Kazakhstan) Timur Kurbanbayev	(Bulgaria) Yordan Yovchev (Netherlands) Yuri van Gelder (China) Dong Zheng	—N/a
Glasgow (2003)	Vault	(Poland) Leszek Blanik	(Romania) Marian Drăgulescu	(China) Lu Bin
Glasgow (2003)	Parallel bars	(Slovenia) Mitja Petkovšek	(Japan) Takehiro Kashima	(France) Florent Marée
Glasgow (2003)	Horizontal bar	(Canada) Alexander Jeltkov	(Kazakhstan) Yernar Yerimbetov	(Japan) Takehiro Kashima (France) Florent Marée
Stuttgart (2003)	Floor exercise	(Canada) Kyle Shewfelt	(Japan) Isao Yoneda	(Romania) Ioan Silviu Suciu
Stuttgart (2003)	Pommel horse	(China) Li Di	(Romania) Marius Urzică	(Romania) Ioan Silviu Suciu
Stuttgart (2003)	Rings	(Russia) Alexander Safoshkin	(Bulgaria) Yordan Yovchev	(Italy) Andrea Coppolino
Stuttgart (2003)	Vault	(Romania) Marian Drăgulescu	(Poland) Leszek Blanik	(Canada) Kyle Shewfelt
Stuttgart (2003)	Parallel bars	(Slovenia) Mitja Petkovšek	(Australia) Philippe Rizzo	(Ukraine) Valeriy Honcharov
Stuttgart (2003)	Horizontal bar	(Japan) Ryota Suzuki	(Australia) Philippe Rizzo	(Slovenia) Aljaž Pegan
Cottbus (2004)	Floor exercise	(Latvia) Igors Vihrovs	(Romania) Ioan Silviu Suciu	(Kazakhstan) Yernar Yerimbetov
Cottbus (2004)	Pommel horse	(Spain) Víctor Cano	(China) Lu Bin	(Romania) Ioan Silviu Suciu
Cottbus (2004)	Rings	(Greece) Dimosthenis Tampakos	(Netherlands) Yuri van Gelder	(China) Dong Zheng
Cottbus (2004)	Vault	(Poland) Leszek Blanik	(China) Lu Bin	(Bulgaria) Filip Yanev
Cottbus (2004)	Parallel bars	(Greece) Vasileios Tsolakidis	(Slovenia) Mitja Petkovšek	(Japan) Takehiro Kashima
Cottbus (2004)	Horizontal bar	(Slovenia) Aljaž Pegan	(Kazakhstan) Yernar Yerimbetov	(Kazakhstan) Stepan Gorbachev
Lyon (2004)	Floor exercise	(Belarus) Dzianis Savenkov	(Netherlands) Jeffrey Wammes	(Canada) Brandon O'Neil
Lyon (2004)	Pommel horse	(Romania) Marius Urzică	(China) Li Di	(Romania) Ioan Silviu Suciu
Lyon (2004)	Rings	(Russia) Aleksandr Safoshkin	(Netherlands) Yuri van Gelder	(Greece) Dimosthenis Tampakos
Lyon (2004)	Vault	(Poland) Leszek Blanik	(Romania) Marian Drăgulescu	(Cuba) Erick López
Lyon (2004)	Parallel bars	(Kazakhstan) Yernar Yerimbetov	(France) Yann Cucherat	(Slovenia) Mitja Petkovšek
Lyon (2004)	Horizontal bar	(Greece) Vlasios Maras	(France) Dimitri Karbanenko	(United States) Dan Gill
Rio de Janeiro (2004)	Floor exercise	(Brazil) Diego Hypólito	(United States) Morgan Hamm	(Bulgaria) Yordan Yovchev
Rio de Janeiro (2004)	Pommel horse	(Hungary) Krisztián Berki	(Brazil) Mosiah Rodrigues	(Sweden) Michael Hjorth
Rio de Janeiro (2004)	Rings	(Bulgaria) Yordan Yovchev	(Kazakhstan) Timur Kurbanbayev	(United States) Raj Bhavsar (Netherlands) Yuri van Gelder
Rio de Janeiro (2004)	Vault	(Brazil) Diego Hypólito	(Kazakhstan) Yernar Yerimbetov	(Puerto Rico) Luis Rivera
Rio de Janeiro (2004)	Parallel bars	(United States) Brett McClure	(Kazakhstan) Yernar Yerimbetov	(United States) Raj Bhavsar
Rio de Janeiro (2004)	Horizontal bar	(United States) Morgan Hamm	(Kazakhstan) Yernar Yerimbetov	(Puerto Rico) Tommy Ramos
La Serena (2004)	Floor exercise	(Brazil) Diego Hypólito	(Hungary) Róbert Gál	(Chile) Tomás González
La Serena (2004)	Pommel horse	(Hungary) Krisztián Berki	(Puerto Rico) Luis Vargas	(Slovakia) Samuel Piasecký
La Serena (2004)	Rings	(Netherlands) Yuri van Gelder	(Venezuela) Regulo Carmona	(Hungary) Levente Fekete
La Serena (2004)	Vault	(Bulgaria) Filip Yanev	(Hungary) Róbert Gál	(Brazil) Diego Hypólito
La Serena (2004)	Parallel bars	(Slovakia) Samuel Piasecký	(Puerto Rico) Luis Vargas	(Hungary) Róbert Gál
La Serena (2004)	Horizontal bar	(Slovenia) Aljaž Pegan	(Slovakia) Samuel Piasecký	(Finland) Jani Tanskanen
Glasgow (2004)	Floor exercise	(Brazil) Diego Hypólito	(Chile) Tomás González	(Romania) Marian Drăgulescu
Glasgow (2004)	Pommel horse	(China) Xiao Qin	(Romania) Marius Urzică	(Japan) Hiroyuki Tomita
Glasgow (2004)	Rings	(China) Huang Xu	(Netherlands) Yuri van Gelder	(Japan) Hiroyuki Tomita
Glasgow (2004)	Vault	(Bulgaria) Filip Yanev	(Romania) Marian Drăgulescu	(Chile) Tomás González
Glasgow (2004)	Parallel bars	(Slovenia) Mitja Petkovšek	(Romania) Marius Urzică	(China) Huang Xu
Glasgow (2004)	Horizontal bar	(Slovenia) Aljaž Pegan	(Japan) Hiroyuki Tomita	(Australia) Philippe Rizzo
Ghent (2004)	Floor exercise	(Brazil) Diego Hypólito	(Romania) Ioan Silviu Suciu	(Netherlands) Jeffrey Wammes
Ghent (2004)	Pommel horse	(China) Xiao Qin	(Romania) Marius Urzică	(Belgium) Günther Couckhuyt
Ghent (2004)	Rings	(Netherlands) Yuri van Gelder	(Algeria) Fateh Ait Saada	(Latvia) Erics Revelinsh
Ghent (2004)	Vault	(Romania) Marian Drăgulescu	(Latvia) Jevgēņijs Saproņenko	(Brazil) Diego Hypólito
Ghent (2004)	Parallel bars	(Slovenia) Mitja Petkovšek	(China) Huang Xu	(Kazakhstan) Yernar Yerimbetov
Ghent (2004)	Horizontal bar	(Kazakhstan) Yernar Yerimbetov	(Czech Republic) Martin Konečný	(China) Xiao Qin
Stuttgart (2004)	Floor exercise	(Germany) Fabian Hambüchen	(Romania) Răzvan Șelariu	(Tunisia) Wajdi Bouallègue
Stuttgart (2004)	Pommel horse	(Romania) Marius Urzică	(Romania) Ioan Silviu Suciu	(Hungary) Krisztián Berki
Stuttgart (2004)	Rings	(Netherlands) Yuri van Gelder	(Italy) Matteo Morandi	(Belarus) Dmitri Savitski
Stuttgart (2004)	Vault	(Romania) Răzvan Șelariu	(Germany) Matthias Fahrig	(Kazakhstan) Yernar Yerimbetov
Stuttgart (2004)	Parallel bars	(Slovenia) Mitja Petkovšek	(France) Yann Cucherat	(Ukraine) Valeriy Honcharov
Stuttgart (2004)	Horizontal bar	(Germany) Fabian Hambüchen	(Canada) Alexander Jeltkov	(Japan) Kensuke Murata
Birmingham (2004 World Cup Final)	Floor exercise	(Brazil) Diego Hypólito	(Japan) Isao Yoneda	(Hungary) Róbert Gál
Birmingham (2004 World Cup Final)	Pommel horse	(China) Xiao Qin	(Romania) Marius Urzică	(Romania) Ioan Silviu Suciu
Birmingham (2004 World Cup Final)	Rings	(Netherlands) Yuri van Gelder	(Japan) Hiroyuki Tomita	(Italy) Matteo Morandi
Birmingham (2004 World Cup Final)	Vault	(China) Lu Bin	(Latvia) Jevgēņijs Saproņenko	(Bulgaria) Filip Yanev
Birmingham (2004 World Cup Final)	Parallel bars	(Slovenia) Mitja Petkovšek	(China) Huang Xu	(Romania) Marius Urzică
Birmingham (2004 World Cup Final)	Horizontal bar	(Ukraine) Valeriy Honcharov	(Japan) Isao Yoneda	(Greece) Vlasios Maras

=== Women ===
Competition	Event	Gold	Silver	Bronze
Thessaloniki (2003)	Vault	(Russia) Natalia Ziganshina	(Ukraine) Alona Kvasha	(Uzbekistan) Oksana Chusovitina
Thessaloniki (2003)	Uneven bars	(Russia) Svetlana Khorkina	(Ukraine) Alina Kozich	(Belgium) Aagje Vanwalleghem
Thessaloniki (2003)	Balance beam	(Romania) Oana Ban	(Italy) Ilaria Colombo	(China) Zhang Nan
Thessaloniki (2003)	Floor exercise	(Romania) Florica Leonida	(Russia) Svetlana Khorkina	(Romania) Oana Ban
Paris (2003)	Vault	(Russia) Anna Pavlova	(France) Coralie Chacon	(Russia) Elena Zamolodchikova
Paris (2003)	Uneven bars	(Russia) Svetlana Khorkina	(United Kingdom) Beth Tweddle	(France) Gaelle Richard
Paris (2003)	Balance beam	(Russia) Anna Pavlova	(Romania) Florica Leonida	(France) Émilie Le Pennec
Paris (2003)	Floor exercise	(Spain) Elena Gómez	(Brazil) Daniele Hypólito	(Romania) Florica Leonida
Cottbus (2003)	Vault	(Uzbekistan) Oksana Chusovitina	(Russia) Anna Pavlova	(Romania) Monica Roșu
Cottbus (2003)	Uneven bars	(United Kingdom) Beth Tweddle	(Ukraine) Alina Kozich	(Spain) Elena Gómez
Cottbus (2003)	Balance beam	(Russia) Anna Pavlova	(Romania) Oana Ban	(Spain) Elena Gómez
Cottbus (2003)	Floor exercise	(Russia) Anna Pavlova	(Spain) Elena Gómez	(Brazil) Daiane dos Santos
Glasgow (2003)	Vault	(Russia) Elena Zamolodchikova	(Uzbekistan) Oksana Chusovitina	(Ukraine) Alina Kozich
Glasgow (2003)	Uneven bars	(United Kingdom) Beth Tweddle	(Ukraine) Alina Kozich	(Ukraine) Inna Teslenko
Glasgow (2003)	Balance beam	(Russia) Anna Pavlova	(Russia) Elena Zamolodchikova	(United Kingdom) Beth Tweddle
Glasgow (2003)	Floor exercise	(Russia) Aleksandra Shevchenko	(Australia) Allana Slater	(Ukraine) Alina Kozich
Stuttgart (2003)	Vault	(Russia) Elena Zamolodchikova	(Uzbekistan) Oksana Chusovitina	(Russia) Svetlana Khorkina
Stuttgart (2003)	Uneven bars	(France) Émilie Le Pennec	(United Kingdom) Beth Tweddle	(Russia) Svetlana Khorkina
Stuttgart (2003)	Balance beam	(Romania) Cătălina Ponor	(Romania) Oana Ban	(Russia) Svetlana Khorkina
Stuttgart (2003)	Floor exercise	(Brazil) Daiane dos Santos	(Russia) Svetlana Khorkina	(Romania) Cătălina Ponor
Cottbus (2004)	Vault	(Uzbekistan) Oksana Chusovitina	(United States) Sarah Shire	(United States) Melanie Sinclair
Cottbus (2004)	Uneven bars	(United Kingdom) Beth Tweddle	(Romania) Florica Leonida	(China) Liu Juan
Cottbus (2004)	Balance beam	(Romania) Cătălina Ponor	(Romania) Florica Leonida	(United States) Melanie Sinclair
Cottbus (2004)	Floor exercise	(Brazil) Daiane dos Santos	(Romania) Cătălina Ponor	(Ukraine) Alina Kozich
Lyon (2004)	Vault	(Uzbekistan) Oksana Chusovitina	(Brazil) Daiane dos Santos	(Cuba) Leyanet González
Lyon (2004)	Uneven bars	(United Kingdom) Beth Tweddle	(France) Marine Debauve	(Romania) Florica Leonida
Lyon (2004)	Balance beam	(Russia) Ludmila Ezhova	(Romania) Cătălina Ponor	(France) Soraya Chaouch
Lyon (2004)	Floor exercise	(Brazil) Daiane dos Santos	(Romania) Cătălina Ponor	(Cuba) Leyanet González
Rio de Janeiro (2004)	Vault	(Uzbekistan) Oksana Chusovitina	(United States) Alicia Sacramone	(Belgium) Aagje Vanwalleghem
Rio de Janeiro (2004)	Uneven bars	(United States) Allyse Ishino	(Brazil) Daniele Hypólito	(Uzbekistan) Oksana Chusovitina
Rio de Janeiro (2004)	Balance beam	(Brazil) Daniele Hypólito	(Brazil) Camila Comin	(Argentina) Celeste Carnevale
Rio de Janeiro (2004)	Floor exercise	(Brazil) Daiane dos Santos	(United States) Allyse Ishino	(Brazil) Camila Comin
La Serena (2004)	Vault	(United States) Carly Janiga	(United States) Marcia Newby	(Brazil) Merly de Jesus
La Serena (2004)	Uneven bars	(Netherlands) Laura van Leeuwen	(Brazil) Daniele Hypólito	(United States) Elizabeth Tricase
La Serena (2004)	Balance beam	(Slovakia) Zuzana Sekerová	(United States) Carly Janiga	(Brazil) Daniele Hypólito
La Serena (2004)	Floor exercise	(United States) Carly Janiga	(Brazil) Daniele Hypólito	(United States) Marcia Newby
Glasgow (2004)	Vault	(Russia) Elena Zamolodchikova	(Russia) Anna Pavlova	(China) Cheng Fei
Glasgow (2004)	Uneven bars	(China) Li Ya	(United Kingdom) Beth Tweddle	(Czech Republic) Jana Šikulová
Glasgow (2004)	Balance beam	(Romania) Cătălina Ponor	(Brazil) Daniele Hypólito	(China) Li Ya
Glasgow (2004)	Floor exercise	(Romania) Cătălina Ponor	(China) Cheng Fei	(United Kingdom) Beth Tweddle
Ghent (2004)	Vault	(Romania) Monica Roșu	(United States) Alicia Sacramone	(Russia) Anna Pavlova
Ghent (2004)	Uneven bars	(China) Li Ya	(United States) Melanie Sinclair	(Brazil) Daniele Hypólito
Ghent (2004)	Balance beam	(Romania) Cătălina Ponor	(Russia) Anna Pavlova	(China) Zhang Nan
Ghent (2004)	Floor exercise	(Romania) Cătălina Ponor	(Brazil) Daniele Hypólito	(Romania) Monica Roșu
Stuttgart (2004)	Vault	(Russia) Anna Pavlova	(Russia) Elena Zamolodchikova	(Brazil) Laís Souza
Stuttgart (2004)	Uneven bars	(Russia) Ludmila Ezhova	(Czech Republic) Jana Šikulová	(Brazil) Daiane dos Santos
Stuttgart (2004)	Balance beam	(Romania) Alexandra Eremia	(Russia) Ludmila Ezhova	(Netherlands) Suzanne Harmes
Stuttgart (2004)	Floor exercise	(Netherlands) Suzanne Harmes	(Romania) Alexandra Eremia	(Brazil) Daiane dos Santos
Birmingham (2004 World Cup Final)	Vault	(United States) Alicia Sacramone	(Romania) Monica Roșu	(Russia) Anna Pavlova
Birmingham (2004 World Cup Final)	Uneven bars	(United States) Chellsie Memmel	(United Kingdom) Beth Tweddle	(China) Li Ya
Birmingham (2004 World Cup Final)	Balance beam	(Romania) Cătălina Ponor	(China) Li Ya (Romania) Alexandra Eremia	—N/a
Birmingham (2004 World Cup Final)	Floor exercise	(Brazil) Daiane dos Santos	(Romania) Cătălina Ponor	(China) Cheng Fei

=== Medal table ===
==== Overall ====
Rank	Nation	Gold	Silver	Bronze	Total
1	Romania	23	25	17	65
2	Russia	17	10	7	34
3	Brazil	12	9	10	31
4	Slovenia	11	2	2	15
5	China	8	9	13	30
6	United States	7	9	7	23
7	Netherlands	7	5	3	15
8	Bulgaria	6	4	3	13
9	Great Britain	4	4	2	10
10	Uzbekistan	4	2	2	8
11	Greece	4	0	5	9
12	Ukraine	3	7	8	18
13	Kazakhstan	3	7	5	15
14	Hungary	3	3	5	11
15	Canada	3	1	2	6
16	Poland	3	1	0	4
17	France	2	7	5	14
18	Latvia	2	4	2	8
19	Spain	2	1	2	5
20	Slovakia	2	1	1	4
21	Germany	2	1	0	3
22	Japan	1	7	5	13
23	Australia	1	3	1	5
24	Belarus	1	0	2	3
25	Egypt	1	0	0	1
26	Italy	0	2	4	6
27	Puerto Rico	0	2	2	4
28	Czech Republic	0	2	1	3
29	Chile	0	1	2	3
30	Algeria	0	1	0	1
30	Denmark	0	1	0	1
30	Venezuela	0	1	0	1
33	Belgium	0	0	3	3
33	Cuba	0	0	3	3
35	Argentina	0	0	1	1
35	Austria	0	0	1	1
35	Finland	0	0	1	1
35	Sweden	0	0	1	1
35	Tunisia	0	0	1	1
Totals (39 entries)		132	132	129	393

==== Men ====
Rank	Nation	Gold	Silver	Bronze	Total
1	Romania	12	13	11	36
2	Slovenia	11	2	2	15
3	China	6	7	6	19
4	Bulgaria	6	4	3	13
5	Brazil	6	1	2	9
6	Netherlands	5	5	2	12
7	Greece	4	0	5	9
8	Kazakhstan	3	7	5	15
9	Hungary	3	3	5	11
10	Ukraine	3	3	4	10
11	Canada	3	1	2	6
12	Poland	3	1	0	4
13	Latvia	2	4	2	8
14	United States	2	2	3	7
15	Russia	2	2	1	5
16	Germany	2	1	0	3
17	Japan	1	7	5	13
18	France	1	5	2	8
19	Australia	1	2	1	4
20	Slovakia	1	1	1	3
21	Belarus	1	0	2	3
22	Egypt	1	0	0	1
22	Spain	1	0	0	1
24	Puerto Rico	0	2	2	4
25	Italy	0	1	4	5
26	Chile	0	1	2	3
27	Algeria	0	1	0	1
27	Czech Republic	0	1	0	1
27	Denmark	0	1	0	1
27	Venezuela	0	1	0	1
31	Austria	0	0	1	1
31	Belgium	0	0	1	1
31	Cuba	0	0	1	1
31	Finland	0	0	1	1
31	Sweden	0	0	1	1
31	Tunisia	0	0	1	1
Totals (36 entries)		80	79	78	237

==== Women ====
Rank	Nation	Gold	Silver	Bronze	Total
1	Russia	15	8	6	29
2	Romania	11	12	6	29
3	Brazil	6	8	8	22
4	United States	5	7	4	16
5	Great Britain	4	4	2	10
6	Uzbekistan	4	2	2	8
7	China	2	2	7	11
8	Netherlands	2	0	1	3
9	France	1	2	3	6
10	Spain	1	1	2	4
11	Slovakia	1	0	0	1
12	Ukraine	0	4	4	8
13	Czech Republic	0	1	1	2
14	Australia	0	1	0	1
14	Italy	0	1	0	1
16	Belgium	0	0	2	2
16	Cuba	0	0	2	2
18	Argentina	0	0	1	1
Totals (18 entries)		52	53	51	156

== See also ==
- 2003–2004 FIG Rhythmic Gymnastics World Cup series
