= 2000 European Men's Artistic Gymnastics Championships =

24th European Men's Artistic Gymnastics Championships
- Location: Bremen, Germany
- Start date: 25 May 2000
- End date: 28 May 2000

The 24th European Men's Artistic Gymnastics Championships were held in Bremen, Germany from 25 May to 28 May 2000. This event was for male gymnasts in both senior and junior levels.

== Medalists ==
Event	Gold	Silver	Bronze
Senior
Team	Russia (RUS)	Romania (ROU)	Ukraine (UKR)
All-around	Alexander Beresch (UKR)	Ivan Ivankov (BLR)	Marian Drăgulescu (ROU)
Floor	Marian Drăgulescu (ROU)	Gervasio Deferr (ESP)	Alexei Bondarenko (RUS)
Pommel horse	Marius Urzică (ROU)	Eric Poujade (FRA)	Alexander Beresch (UKR)
Rings	Dimosthenis Tampakos (GRE)	Szilvester Csollany (HUN)	Ivan Ivankov (BLR)
Vault	Ioan Silviu Suciu (ROU)	Dmitri Karbonenko (FRA)	Alexander Svetlitchni (UKR)
Parallel bars	Mitja Petkovšek (SLO)	Ivan Ivankov (BLR)	Alexei Bondarenko (RUS)
Horizontal bar	Alexander Beresch (UKR)	Ivan Ivankov (BLR)	Aljaž Pegan (SLO)
Junior
Team	Russia (RUS)	France (FRA)	Germany (GER)
All-around	Georgi Grebenkov (RUS)	Dmitri Drevin (RUS)	Vlasios Maras (GRE)
Floor	Evgeny Bogonosyuk (UKR)	Sergei Gusevs (LAT)	Antal Ashurkou (BLR)
Pommel horse	Ilie Daniel Popescu (ROU)	Damien Millot (FRA)	Pavel Shyshou (BLR)
Rings	Dmitri Drevin (RUS)	Jose Luis Fernandez (ESP)	Yuri Van Gelber (NED)
Vault	Filip Ianev (BUL)	Yaroslav Basenko (UKR)	Kim Holmen (NOR)
Parallel bars	Waidemar Eichhorn (GER)	Dzanis Savenkov (BLR)	Dmitri Drevin (RUS)
Horizontal bar	Georgi Grebenkov (RUS)	Jose Luis Fernandez (ESP)	Tiberiu Cizmadia (ROU)

=== Medal table ===
==== Combined ====
Rank	Nation	Gold	Silver	Bronze	Total
1	Russia (RUS)	5	1	3	9
2	Romania (ROU)	4	1	2	7
3	Ukraine (UKR)	3	1	3	7
4	Germany (GER)	1	0	1	2
4	Greece (GRE)	1	0	1	2
4	Slovenia (SLO)	1	0	1	2
7	Bulgaria (BUL)	1	0	0	1
8	Belarus (BLR)	0	4	3	7
9	France (FRA)	0	4	0	4
10	Spain (ESP)	0	3	0	3
11	Hungary (HUN)	0	1	0	1
11	Latvia (LAT)	0	1	0	1
13	Netherlands (NED)	0	0	1	1
13	Norway (NOR)	0	0	1	1
Totals (14 entries)		16	16	16	48

==== Seniors ====
Rank	Nation	Gold	Silver	Bronze	Total
1	Romania (ROU)	3	1	1	5
2	Ukraine (UKR)	2	0	3	5
3	Russia (RUS)	1	0	2	3
4	Slovenia (SLO)	1	0	1	2
5	Greece (GRE)	1	0	0	1
6	Belarus (BLR)	0	3	1	4
7	France (FRA)	0	2	0	2
8	Hungary (HUN)	0	1	0	1
8	Spain (ESP)	0	1	0	1
Totals (9 entries)		8	8	8	24

==== Juniors ====
Rank	Nation	Gold	Silver	Bronze	Total
1	Russia (RUS)	4	1	1	6
2	Ukraine (UKR)	1	1	0	2
3	Germany (GER)	1	0	1	2
3	Romania (ROU)	1	0	1	2
5	Bulgaria (BUL)	1	0	0	1
6	France (FRA)	0	2	0	2
6	Spain (ESP)	0	2	0	2
8	Belarus (BLR)	0	1	2	3
9	Latvia (LAT)	0	1	0	1
10	Greece (GRE)	0	0	1	1
10	Netherlands (NED)	0	0	1	1
10	Norway (NOR)	0	0	1	1
Totals (12 entries)		8	8	8	24

== Senior results ==
Full results of men's senior competition.

=== Teams ===
Rank	Team	Apparatus						Total
Rank	Team	F	PH	R	V	PB	HB	Total
1st place, gold medalist(s)	Russia (RUS)	28.887	28.787	28.212	28.125	28.686	28.374	171.071
2nd place, silver medalist(s)	Romania (ROU)	28.111	28.949	28.049	28.762	28.474	28.499	170.844
3rd place, bronze medalist(s)	Ukraine (UKR)	28.537	28.150	28.099	28.861	28.462	28.499	170.608
4	France (FRA)	28.149	28.149	26.925	27.899	28.337	28.424	167.883
5	Germany (GER)	28.074	26.800	28.774	27.974	27.661	28.549	167.832
6	Bulgaria (BUL)	28.224	28.374	27.387	27.761	27.825	27.787	167.358
7	Spain (ESP)	27.387	27.736	28.112	27.461	28.374	28.262	167.332
8	Belarus (BLR)	26.325	27.862	28.662	26.874	27.637	28.512	165.872
9	Latvia (LAT)	28.125	26.937	27.562	28.362	27.411	26.525	164.922
10	Switzerland (SUI)	26.374	27.649	27.887	27.887	26.550	28.086	164.433
11	Hungary (HUN)	26.799	27.287	28.137	27.562	26.562	28.074	164.421
12	Great Britain (GBR)	27.149	27.124	27.950	27.674	26.487	26.825	163.209
13	Italy (ITA)	25.025	27.549	28.125	26.799	26.225	27.287	161.010
14	Greece (GRE)	26.237	26.786	27.811	27.311	27.762	25.099	161.006
15	Finland (FIN)	25.700	27.549	25.624	26.550	26.499	26.687	158.609
16	Czech Republic (CZE)	26.099	26.162	24.875	27.025	27.262	26.850	158.273
17	Slovakia (SVK)	26.037	25.237	26.475	25.961	25.774	27.362	156.846
18	Poland (POL)	24.025	25.912	25.950	27.887	26.575	26.449	156.798
19	Norway (NOR)	25.525	26.625	25.300	27.437	25.162	25.737	155.786
20	Denmark (DEN)	26.299	22.700	25.775	27.374	24.387	27.199	153.734
21	Austria (AUT)	24.830	26.987	23.725	27.300	24.049	25.199	152.110
22	Portugal (POR)	26.062	26.637	20.900	26.699	26.300	24.650	151.248
23	Croatia (CRO)	24.962	25.962	22.212	26.200	24.737	25.900	149.973
24	Turkey (TUR)	25.125	23.612	21.900	27.161	23.825	24.612	146.235
25	Slovenia (SLO)	23.561	17.450	14.200	25.712	27.025	25.187	133.135
26	Cyprus (CYP)	23.649	23.812	24.424	17.400	22.100	18.725	130.110

=== All-around ===
Rank	Athlete	Nation	Apparatus						Total
Rank	Athlete	Nation	F	PH	R	V	PB	HB	Total
1st place, gold medalist(s)	Alexander Beresch	Ukraine (UKR)	9.650	9.700	9.500	9.650	9.687	9.700	57.787
2nd place, silver medalist(s)	Ivan Ivankov	Belarus (BLR)	9.462	9.687	9.662	9.375	9.737	9.675	57.587
3rd place, bronze medalist(s)	Marian Drăgulescu	Romania (ROU)	9.625	9.537	9.387	9.712	9.562	9.625	57.448
4	Alexei Bondarenko	Russia (RUS)	9.525	9.662	9.612	9.625	9.637	9.025	57.086
5	Alexei Nemov	Russia (RUS)	9.525	9.675	9.262	9.587	9.612	9.262	56.923
6	Igor Vichrov	Latvia (LAT)	9.562	9.137	9.375	9.462	9.500	9.312	56.348
7	Yordan Yovchev	Bulgaria (BUL)	9.662	9.500	9.700	9.312	9.375	8.775	56.324
8	Alexander Svetlitchni	Ukraine (UKR)	8.825	9.600	9.225	9.637	9.637	9.362	56.286
9	Ilia Giorgadze	Georgia (GEO)	9.350	9.300	9.437	9.050	9.475	9.587	56.199
10	Víctor Cano	Spain (ESP)	9.225	9.112	9.250	9.037	9.537	9.475	55.636
11	Sergei Pfeifer	Germany (GER)	8.662	8.987	9.650	9.125	9.587	9.425	55.436
12	Runnar Alexandersson	Iceland (ISL)	8.962	9.437	9.150	8.962	9.525	9.400	55.436
13	Pavel Gofman	Israel (ISR)	9.337	9.287	9.312	9.237	9.100	9.012	55.285
14	Flemming Solberg	Norway (NOR)	8.875	9.225	8.725	9.375	9.412	9.500	55.112
15	Yann Cucherat	France (FRA)	8.862	8.737	9.487	8.850	9.550	9.600	55.086
16	Craig Heap	Great Britain (GBR)	9.150	9.200	9.475	8.625	9.212	9.187	54.849
17	Timur Kuzmin	Croatia (CRO)	9.312	8.950	8.950	9.275	9.200	9.137	54.824
18	Thomas Zimmermann	Austria (AUT)	8.525	9.375	8.275	9.487	8.962	8.837	53.461
19	Jani Tanskanen	Finland (FIN)	8.912	8.700	8.725	8.812	8.587	9.625	53.361
20	Erik Revelinsh	Latvia (LAT)	8.650	8.612	8.375	8.950	9.300	8.712	52.599
21	Georgios Elissiadis	Greece (GRE)	8.387	9.162	9.337	7.800	9.025	8.550	52.261
22	Jiri Firt	Czech Republic (CZE)	7.950	9.075	8.225	9.012	8.825	9.000	52.087
23	Anders Pettersson	Sweden (SWE)	8.562	9.250	8.262	9.300	7.925	8.250	51.549
24	Stanislav Micheller	Slovakia (SVK)	8.837	9.312	7.875	9.125	8.675	6.975	50.799

=== Floor ===
Rank	Gymnast	Total
1st place, gold medalist(s)	Marian Drăgulescu (ROU)	9.687
2nd place, silver medalist(s)	Gervasio Deferr (ESP)	9.675
3rd place, bronze medalist(s)	Alexei Bondarenko (RUS)	9.587
3rd place, bronze medalist(s)	Igor Vichrov (LAT)	9.587
5	Kasper Fardan (DEN)	9.487
6	Alexander Beresch (UKR)	9.387
7	Alexander Pereschkura (UKR)	9.362
8	Alexei Nemov (RUS)	8.887

=== Pommel horse ===
Rank	Gymnast	Total
1st place, gold medalist(s)	Marius Urzică (ROU)	9.762
2nd place, silver medalist(s)	Eric Poujade (FRA)	9.750
3rd place, bronze medalist(s)	Alexander Beresch (UKR)	9.662
4	Dorin Petcu (ROU)	9.625
5	Runnar Alexandersson (ISL)	9.612
6	Alexei Nemov (RUS)	9.600
7	Alexei Bondarenko (RUS)	9.475
8	Ivan Ivankov (BLR)	9.287

=== Rings ===
Rank	Gymnast	Total
1st place, gold medalist(s)	Dimosthenis Tampakos (GRE)	9.737
2nd place, silver medalist(s)	Szilvester Csollany (HUN)	9.675
3rd place, bronze medalist(s)	Ivan Ivankov (BLR)	9.650
4	Yordan Yovchev (BUL)	9.625
5	Marius Tobă (GER)	9.525
6	Omar Cortes Gonzales (ESP)	9.337
7	Andreas Kousios (CYP)	9.162
8	Georgius Tvauri (GEO)	9.062

=== Vault ===
Rank	Gymnast	Total
1st place, gold medalist(s)	Ioan Suciu (ROU)	9.631
2nd place, silver medalist(s)	Dmitri Karbonenko (FRA)	9.625
3rd place, bronze medalist(s)	Alexander Svetlitchni (UKR)	9.606
4	Gervasio Deferr (ESP)	9.537
5	Dieter Rehm (SUI)	9.459
6	Marian Drăgulescu (ROU)	9.481
7	Rene Tschernitschek (GER)	9.343
8	Kanukai Jackson (GBR)	9.174

=== Parallel bars ===
Rank	Gymnast	Total
1st place, gold medalist(s)	Mitja Petkovšek (SLO)	9.800
2nd place, silver medalist(s)	Ivan Ivankov (BLR)	9.775
3rd place, bronze medalist(s)	Alexei Bondarenko (RUS)	9.725
4	Alexander Beresch (UKR)	9.700
5	Dmitri Karbonenko (FRA)	9.637
6	Alexander Svetlitchni (UKR)	9.662
7	Sergej Pfeifer (GER)	9.600
8	Marius Urzică (ROU)	9.200

=== Horizontal bar ===
Rank	Gymnast	Total
1st place, gold medalist(s)	Alexander Beresch (UKR)	9.737
2nd place, silver medalist(s)	Ivan Ivankov (BLR)	9.725
3rd place, bronze medalist(s)	Aljaž Pegan (SLO)	9.687
4	Yann Cucherat (FRA)	9.637
5	Dmitri Nonin (GER)	9.600
6	Dieter Rehm (SUI)	9.587
7	Zoltan Supola (HUN)	9.550
8	Ilia Giorgadze (GEO)	7.762

== Junior results ==
Full results of men's junior competition.

=== Team ===
Rank	Nation	Apparatus						Total
Rank	Nation	F	PH	R	V	PB	HB	Total
1st place, gold medalist(s)	Russia (RUS)	26.387	27.012	28.187	27.749	26.374	27.612	162.321
2nd place, silver medalist(s)	France (FRA)	25.337	26.500	25.437	27.274	25.662	27.687	157.897
3rd place, bronze medalist(s)	Germany (GER)	26.362	26.337	25.237	26.786	26.112	26.662	157.496
4	Belarus (BLR)	26.624	27.325	25.675	25.774	24.774	26.437	156.609
5	Greece (GRE)	26.475	25.512	24.812	26.724	26.336	26.512	156.371
6	Spain (ESP)	25.987	26.249	24.274	26.425	26.287	26.549	155.771
7	Ukraine (UKR)	25.074	25.075	24.349	27.750	25.324	26.987	154.559
8	Great Britain (GBR)	25.150	26.125	24.175	27.524	25.037	25.049	153.060
9	Romania (ROU)	25.025	26.900	21.912	27.187	24.175	26.274	151.473
10	Italy (ITA)	25.812	24.925	23.500	26.087	25.511	25.062	150.897
11	Switzerland (SUI)	25.737	24.250	23.099	26.024	25.562	25.537	150.209
12	Latvia (LAT)	25.387	24.800	24.087	25.536	23.812	23.850	147.472
13	Netherlands (NED)	24.400	23.675	24.962	25.549	23.200	24.350	146.136
14	Slovakia (SVK)	24.299	24.462	20.637	25.475	24.837	24.900	144.610
15	Czech Republic (CZE)	24.887	20.850	24.037	25.537	23.249	25.424	143.984
16	Israel (ISR)	24.712	22.875	22.450	25.324	24.450	23.912	143.723
17	Hungary (HUN)	24.950	22.525	22.025	25.912	23.987	24.012	143.411
18	Poland (POL)	23.975	23.225	21.125	25.129	24.712	23.637	141.823
19	Austria (AUT)	22.687	19.575	21.000	26.050	21.700	23.550	133.562
20	Armenia (ARM)	24.012	22.750	19.900	24.687	22.037	19.075	132.461
21	Turkey (TUR)	23.012	16.375	20.637	25.061	22.212	23.912	131.209

=== All-around ===
Rank	Athlete	Nation	Apparatus						Total
Rank	Athlete	Nation	F	PH	R	V	PB	HB	Total
1st place, gold medalist(s)	Georgy Grebenkov	Russia (RUS)	9.350	9.412	8.975	9.200	9.512	9.300	55.749
2nd place, silver medalist(s)	Dmitri Drevin	Russia (RUS)	9.000	9.312	9.275	9.025	9.400	8.950	54.962
3rd place, bronze medalist(s)	Vlasios Maras	Greece (GRE)	9.237	9.125	8.350	8.987	9.400	9.250	54.349
4	Salvatore Parisi	Italy (ITA)	9.050	8.687	8.725	9.150	9.237	9.050	53.899
5	Denis Savenkov	Belarus (BLR)	9.462	9.312	8.525	9.100	8.500	8.775	53.674
6	Jose Luis Fernandez	Spain (ESP)	8.750	8.800	8.800	8.975	8.375	9.562	53.262
7	Martin Konecny	Czech Republic (CZE)	8.850	8.650	8.287	8.737	9.125	8.375	52.024
8	James Evans	Great Britain (GBR)	8.887	8.475	8.275	9.362	8.625	8.250	51.874
9	Edik Golob	Israel (ISR)	8.275	8.762	8.725	8.737	8.475	8.800	51.774
10	Sergei Gusevs	Latvia (LAT)	9.450	8.750	7.975	8.425	8.050	8.462	51.112
11	Denys Gref	Ukraine (UKR)	8.137	8.625	7.762	8.925	8.550	9.025	51.024
12	Richard Kemko	Slovakia (SVK)	8.175	8.112	7.900	8.812	8.712	9.075	50.786
13	Raphael Wignanitz	France (FRA)	7.525	8.650	7.825	8.925	8.900	8.850	50.675
14	Alexander Benko	Slovakia (SVK)	8.450	8.675	8.150	8.637	8.550	8.162	50.624
15	Filip Yanev	Bulgaria (BUL)	9.012	6.950	7.925	9.235	8.462	8.200	49.874
16	Ivo Bennenk	Netherlands (NED)	8.287	8.612	7.950	8.562	8.275	8.100	49.786
17	Haluk Coskun	Turkey (TUR)	8.362	7.700	8.075	8.650	8.612	8.362	49.761
18	Niki Boschentstein	Switzerland (SUI)	8.887	7.875	7.825	8.362	7.975	8.250	49.174
19	Jerker Taudien	Sweden (SWE)	8.450	7.800	7.725	8.912	7.487	8.125	48.499
20	Bogdan Orzata	Romania (ROU)	7.925	8.575	6.275	8.750	7.900	9.037	48.462
21	Roman Kulesza	Poland (POL)	8.575	7.175	7.100	8.600	8.450	7.575	47.475
22	Tamas Szeremi	Hungary (HUN)	8.287	8.250	6.925	8.387	8.175	7.200	47.224
23	Jimmy Bostrom	Sweden (SWE)	8.787	8.562	5.550	8.900	7.925	7.087	46.811
24	Pierre Frere	Belgium (BEL)	8.475	7.925	7.375	8.637	7.075	6.850	46.337

=== Floor ===
Rank	Gymnast	Total
1st place, gold medalist(s)	Evgeny Bogonosyuk (UKR)	9.512
2nd place, silver medalist(s)	Sergei Gusevs (LAT)	9.300
3rd place, bronze medalist(s)	Antal Ashurkou (BLR)	9.225
4	Peter Feusi (SUI)	9.125
5	Marcel Niess (GER)	8.625
6	Konstandinos Barbakis (GRE)	8.450
7	Georgi Grebenkov (RUS)	8.112
8	Denis Savenkov (BLR)	7.795

=== Pommel horse ===
Rank	Gymnast	Total
1st place, gold medalist(s)	Ilie Daniel Popescu (ROU)	9.625
2nd place, silver medalist(s)	Damien Millot (FRA)	9.525
3rd place, bronze medalist(s)	Pavel Shyshou (BLR)	9.387
4	Denis Savenkov (BLR)	9.325
5	Francisco Maria (ESP)	9.287
6	Dmitri Drevin (RUS)	9.250
6	Sergej Erjutin (GER)	9.250
8	Bruce Dennison (GBR)	9.200

=== Rings ===
Rank	Gymnast	Total
1st place, gold medalist(s)	Dmitri Drevin (RUS)	9.425
2nd place, silver medalist(s)	Jose Luis Fernandez (ESP)	9.187
3rd place, bronze medalist(s)	Yuri van Gelder (NED)	9.012
4	Georgi Grebenkov (RUS)	8.987
5	Kyril Bondarenko (UKR)	8.825
6	Raphael Wignanitz (GER)	8.687
7	Edik Golob (ISR)	8.487
8	Vladimir Novotny (CZE)	7.700

=== Vault ===
Rank	Gymnast	Total
1st place, gold medalist(s)	Filip Yanev (BUL)	9.939
2nd place, silver medalist(s)	Yaroslav Basenko (UKR)	9.318
3rd place, bronze medalist(s)	Kim Holmen (NOR)	9.156
4	Vladimir Virsky (RUS)	9.000
5	James Evans (GBR)	8.987
6	Cristian Stefanescu (ROU)	8.931
7	Georgi Grebenkov (RUS)	8.631
8	Konstandinos Barbakis (GRE)	4.012

=== Parallel bars ===
Rank	Gymnast	Total
1st place, gold medalist(s)	Waidemar Eichhorn (GER)	9.450
2nd place, silver medalist(s)	Denis Savenkov (BLR)	9.362
3rd place, bronze medalist(s)	Dmitri Drevin (RUS)	9.350
4	Georgi Grebenkov (RUS)	9.262
5	Roman Kulesza (POL)	9.075
6	Vlasios Maras (GRE)	9.062
7	Mathieu Tixier (FRA)	8.637
8	Francisco Maria (ESP)	8.325

=== Horizontal bar ===
Rank	Gymnast	Total
1st place, gold medalist(s)	Georgi Grebenkov (RUS)	9.625
2nd place, silver medalist(s)	Jose Luis Fernandez (ESP)	9.550
3rd place, bronze medalist(s)	Tiberiu Cizmadia (ROU)	9.537
4	Benjamin Poiret (FRA)	9.512
4	Vlasios Maras (GRE)	9.512
6	Marcel Niess (GER)	9.287
7	Dmitri Drevin (RUS)	8.562
8	Alexandros Nakos (GRE)	8.475
