= 2004 FIG Artistic Gymnastics World Cup final =

International gymnastics competition

The 2004 Artistic Gymnastics World Cup Final was held in Birmingham, England in 2004. This was the fourth edition of the World Cup Final. From 2003 to 2004, a series of qualifying events were held, culminating in a final event, the World Cup Final. The different stages, sometimes referred to as World Cup Qualifiers, mostly served the purpose of awarding points to individual gymnasts and groups according to their placements. These points would be added up over the two-year period to qualify a limited number of athletes to the biennial World Cup Final event.

== Medal winners ==
| Event | Gold | Silver | Bronze | Ref. |
| Men's floor exercise | (Brazil) Diego Hypólito | (Japan) Isao Yoneda | (Hungary) Róbert Gál | |
| Men's pommel horse | (China) Xiao Qin | (Romania) Marius Urzică | (Romania) Ioan Silviu Suciu | |
| Men's still rings | (Netherlands) Yuri van Gelder | (Japan) Hiroyuki Tomita | (Italy) Matteo Morandi | |
| Men's vault | (China) Lu Bin | (Latvia) Jevgēņijs Saproņenko | (Bulgaria) Filip Yanev | |
| Men's parallel bars | (Slovenia) Mitja Petkovšek | (China) Huang Xu | (Romania) Marius Urzică | |
| Men's horizontal bar | (Ukraine) Valeriy Honcharov | (Japan) Isao Yoneda | (Greece) Vlasios Maras | |
| Women's vault | (United States) Alicia Sacramone | (Romania) Monica Roșu | (Russia) Anna Pavlova | |
| Women's uneven bars | (United States) Chellsie Memmel | (United Kingdom) Beth Tweddle | (China) Li Ya | |
| Women's balance beam | (Romania) Cătălina Ponor | (China) Li Ya (Romania) Alexandra Eremia | None awarded | |
| Women's floor exercise | (Brazil) Daiane dos Santos | (Romania) Catalina Ponor | (China) Cheng Fei | |
