= 2000 FIG Artistic Gymnastics World Cup final =

International gymnastics competition

The 2000 Artistic Gymnastics World Cup Final was held in Glasgow, Scotland in 2000. This was the second edition of the World Cup Final. From 1999 to 2000, a series of qualifying events were held, culminating in a final event, the World Cup Final. The different stages, sometimes referred to as World Cup Qualifiers, mostly served the purpose of awarding points to individual gymnasts and groups according to their placements. These points would be added up over the two-year period to qualify a limited number of athletes to the biennial World Cup Final event.

== Medal winners ==
Event	Gold	Silver	Bronze	Ref.
Men's floor exercise	(Spain) Gervasio Deferr	(Canada) Kyle Shewfelt (Bulgaria) Yordan Yovchev	None awarded	
Men's pommel horse	(Romania) Marius Urzică	(Belarus) Ivan Ivankov	(China) Xing Aowei	
Men's still rings	(Hungary) Szilveszter Csollány	(Bulgaria) Yordan Yovchev	(Belarus) Ivan Ivankov	
Men's vault	(Romania) Marian Drăgulescu	(Spain) Gervasio Deferr	(Latvia) Jevgēņijs Saproņenko	
Men's parallel bars	(Slovenia) Mitja Petkovšek	(Russia) Alexei Bondarenko	(Slovenia) Aljaž Pegan (South Korea) Lee Joo-hyung	
Men's horizontal bar	(Ukraine) Alexander Beresch	(Slovenia) Aljaž Pegan	(Canada) Alexander Jeltkov	
Women's vault	(Russia) Elena Zamolodchikova	(Romania) Simona Amânar	(Poland) Joanna Skowrońska	
Women's uneven bars	(China) Ling Jie	(Australia) Allana Slater	(Romania) Andreea Răducan	
Women's balance beam	(Romania) Andreea Răducan	(Romania) Simona Amânar	(China) Ling Jie	
Women's floor exercise	(Romania) Andreea Răducan	(Russia) Elena Zamolodchikova	(China) Dong Fangxiao (Romania) Simona Amânar	
