= 2000 European Artistic Gymnastics Championships =

The 2000 European Artistic Gymnastics Championships consisted of the following competitions:

- 2000 European Men's Artistic Gymnastics Championships, held in Bremen, Germany, from 25 May to 28 May 2000;
- 2000 European Women's Artistic Gymnastics Championships, held in Paris, France, from 12 to 14 May 2000.
