= Yernar Yerimbetov =

Kazakhstani artistic gymnast

- Full name: Yernar Saparbekovich Yerimbetov
- Alternative name: Ernar Erimbetov
- Born: 15 February 1980 (age 46) Almaty, Kazakh SSR
- Height: 170 cm (5 ft 7 in)

Gymnastics career
- Discipline: Men's artistic gymnastics
- Country represented: Kazakhstan
- Club: CSKA Almaty
- Head coach: Vladimir Espanov
Medal record
Representing Kazakhstan
Asian Games
Bronze medal – third place	2006 Doha	Vault
Asian Championships
Gold medal – first place	2003 Guangzhou	Floor exercise
Gold medal – first place	2003 Guangzhou	Horizontal bar
Silver medal – second place	2003 Guangzhou	Vault
World University Games
Gold medal – first place	2003 Daegu	Vault
Gold medal – first place	2003 Daegu	Parallel bars
Silver medal – second place	2003 Daegu	All-around
Silver medal – second place	2005 Izmir	Parallel bars
Bronze medal – third place	2005 Izmir	Vault
FIG World Cup
Event / 1st / 2nd / 3rd; Apparatus World Cup / 0 / 0 / 0

Yernar Saparbekovich Yerimbetov (born 15 February 1980) is a Kazakhstani artistic gymnast. He is the 2006 Asian Games vault bronze medalist and the 2003 Summer Universiade vault and parallel bars champion and all-around silver medalist. He represented Kazakhstan at the 2004 Summer Olympics, finishing 14th in the all-around and eighth in the parallel bars final.

== Career ==
Yerimbetov first competed internationally at age 17 in the 1997 Junior International and finished 24th in the all-around.

=== 2000–2002 ===
He began competing in senior competitions in 2000 and won a silver medal on the parallel bars behind Aljaž Pegan at the 2001 Cottbus World Cup. At the 2001 World Championships, he was the leader in the all-around final at the halfway point of the competition, but a mistake in the fourth rotation caused him to fall to sixth place. He also qualified for the floor exercise and vault finals, finishing seventh and fifth, respectively.

Yerimbetov represented Kazakhstan at the 2002 Asian Games and finished fourth on the vault, parallel bars, and horizontal bar. He then won a bronze medal on the vault at the 2002 Glasgow World Cup. He placed sixth in the vault final at the 2002 World Championships.

=== 2003 ===
Yerimbetov began the 2003 season with a bronze medal on the parallel bars at the Paris World Cup. He then won a silver medal on the horizontal bar at the Glasgow World Cup. At the 2003 Asian Championships, he won gold medals on the floor exercise and the horizontal bar and a silver medal on the vault. He won the silver medal in the all-around at the 2003 Summer Universiade behind South Korea's Yang Tae-young. In the event finals, he tied with Yang for the parallel bars title, and he tied with Latvia's Jevgēņijs Saproņenko for the vault title. At the 2003 World Championships, he placed fourth in the all-around and was less than two-tenths of a point away from a medal.

=== 2004 ===
Yerimbetov won a silver medal on the horizontal bar and a bronze medal on the floor exercise at the 2004 Cottbus World Cup. Then at the World Cup in Lyon, he won the gold medal on the parallel bars. He won three silver medals at the Rio de Janeiro World Cup- vault, parallel bars, and horizontal bar. He then competed 2004 Summer Olympics and placed 14th in the all-around final after placing fifth in the qualification round. In the parallel bars final, he finished eighth. After the Olympic Games, he won a gold medal on the horizontal bar and a bronze medal on the parallel bars at the Ghent World Cup. He then won a bronze medal on the vault at the Stuttgart World Cup.

=== 2005–2009 ===
Yerimbetov won a gold medal on the horizontal bar at 2005 Ghent World Cup. He then won a silver medal on the vault behind Marian Drăgulescu at the Paris World Cup. Then at the 2005 Summer Universiade, he won a silver medal on the parallel bars and a bronze medal on the vault. He finished 17th in the all-around final at the 2005 World Championships.

Yerimbetov won bronze medals on the vault at both the 2006 Cottbus World Cup and the 2006 Asian Games. He then finished fourth in the vault final at the 2006 World Championships.

In 2007, Yerimbetov seriously injured his shoulder, causing him to miss the 2008 Summer Olympics, but he returned to competition at the end of 2008. He competed on the vault, parallel bars, and horizontal bar at the 2009 World Championships but did not advance past the qualification round.

=== 2010–2011 ===
Yerimbetov represented Kazakhstan at the 2010 Asian Games and helped his team finish fourth. Individually, he finished fourth in the vault final and fifth in the horizontal bar final. He competed in the all-around at the 2010 World Championships and placed 60th in the qualification round.

Yerimbetov won a silver medal on the parallel bars at the 2011 Doha World Cup. His final major competition was the 2011 World Championships, and he helped Kazakhstan place 24th as a team.

== Personal life ==
Yerimbetov married a former gymnast, and in 2003, their son Malik was born.
