= Aljaž Pegan =

Slovenian gymnast (born 1974)

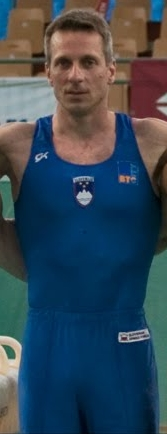
- Pegan in 2010

Personal information
- Born: 2 June 1974 (age 52)

Gymnastics career
- Discipline: Men's artistic gymnastics
- Country represented: Slovenia
- Head coach: Joze Mesl
Medal record
World Championships
Gold medal – first place	2005 Melbourne	Horizontal bar
Silver medal – second place	2002 Debrecen	Horizontal bar
Silver medal – second place	2006 Aarhus	Horizontal bar
Silver medal – second place	2007 Stuttgart	Horizontal bar
European Championships
Gold medal – first place	1994 Prague	Horizontal bar
Gold medal – first place	2004 Ljubljana	Horizontal bar
Silver medal – second place	2007 Amsterdam	Horizontal bar
Bronze medal – third place	2000 Bremen	Horizontal bar
Bronze medal – third place	2008 Lausanne	Horizontal bar
Mediterranean Games
Silver medal – second place	1993 Agde	Horizontal bar
Silver medal – second place	2009 Pescara	Horizontal bar
Bronze medal – third place	1993 Agde	Team
Bronze medal – third place	2001 Tunis	Horizontal bar

Aljaž Pegan (born 2 June 1974) is a Slovenian former artistic gymnast. He was primarily a horizontal bar specialist and won gold at the 2005 World Championships. He is also a three-time World silver medalist (2002, 2006, 2007) and the 2004 European champion on the horizontal bar. His international career spanned more than two decades, but he never participated in the Olympic Games.

== Gymnastics career ==
Pegan began gymnastics when she was six years old, and he worked with coach Joze Mesl from the age of 13 until the end of his career. He made his first World Championships appearance in 1989.

=== 1994–1999 ===
Pegan advanced to his first World Championships final in 1994 and finished sixth with a score of 9.275. Then at the 1996 World Championships, he finished fourth, only 0.012 points behind the bronze medalist Vitaly Scherbo.

In 1998, Pegan received a one-month ban after testing positive for ephedrine. He competed at the 1998 Paris World Cup and won the horizontal bar gold medal. At the 1999 Glasgow World Cup, he won silver medals on both the parallel bars and the horizontal bar. Then at the Stuttgart World Cup, he won a bronze medal on the parallel bars and a silver medal on the horizontal bar.

=== 2000–2002 ===
At the 2000 European Championships, Pegan won the bronze medal on the horizontal bar behind Oleksandr Beresch and Ivan Ivankov. He also won the bronze medal at the 2001 Mediterranean Games. He then won a gold medal at the 2001 Paris World Cup on the horizontal bar. He won both the parallel bars and the horizontal bar at the 2001 Cottbus World Cup.

Pegan finished fourth in the horizontal bar final at the 2002 European Championships. Then at the 2002 World Championships, he tied with Ivan Ivankov for the silver medal with a score of 9.700. He won the gold medal on the horizontal bar at the 2002 World Cup final.

=== 2003–2005 ===
At the 2003 Cottbus World Cup, Pegan won the horizontal bar gold medal. He did not advance to the final at the 2003 World Championships. He tied with Vlasios Maras for the horizontal bar title at the 2004 European Championships.

Pegan won the gold medal on the horizontal bar at the 2005 World Championships with a score of 9.662. The same day, Mitja Petkovšek won the gold medal on the parallel bars, and they became the first Slovenian world champions in gymnastics since Miroslav Cerar won the pommel horse title in 1970.

=== 2006–2009 ===
At the 2006 World Championships, Pegan won the silver medal behind Australia's Philippe Rizzo. Then at the 2007 European Championships, he won a silver medal behind Germany's Fabian Hambüchen. He also won the silver medal on the horizontal bar at the 2007 World Championships, once again behind Hambüchen. He did not qualify for the 2008 Summer Olympics because only the world championships gold medalists earned berths.

Pegan tied with Turkey's Ümit Şamiloğlu for the bronze medal at the 2008 European Championships. He then won the silver medal at the 2009 Mediterranean Games behind Italy's Enrico Pozzo. He finished fifth at the 2009 World Championships.

=== 2010–2013 ===
Pegan finished eighth in the horizontal bar final at the 2010 European Championships. He won gold medals at both the 2010 Maribor and Moscow World Cups.

Pegan announced his retirement in 2013 and was honored at the Ljubljana World Challenge Cup.

== Post-gymnastics ==
After retiring from the sport at the age of 39, Pegan began coaching, including coaching his former competitor Ümit Şamiloğlu. In 2017, he was elected to a four-year term as the men's artistic gymnastics representative on the International Gymnastics Federation (FIG) Athletes' Commission. At the end of his term, he ran and was elected to be President of the FIG Athletes’ Commission.
