= Gymnastics at the 2010 Asian Games – Men's horizontal bar =

Men's horizontal bar at the 2010 Asian Games
- Venue: Asian Games Town Gymnasium
- Date: 13–17 November 2010
- Competitors: 61 from 16 nations

Medalists
gold medal	Zhang Chenglong	China
silver medal	Shun Kuwahara	Japan
bronze medal	Teng Haibin	China

The men's horizontal bar competition at the 2010 Asian Games in Guangzhou, China was held on 13 and 17 November 2010 at the Asian Games Town Gymnasium.

== Schedule ==
All times are China Standard Time (UTC+08:00)

Date	Time	Event
Saturday, 13 November 2010	09:30	Qualification
Wednesday, 17 November 2010	21:00	Final

== Results ==
=== Qualification ===
Rank	Athlete	Score
1	Zhang Chenglong (CHN)	16.100
2	Kim Ji-hoon (KOR)	15.900
3	Hisashi Mizutori (JPN)	15.750
4	Shun Kuwahara (JPN)	15.700
5	Teng Haibin (CHN)	14.450
6	Feng Zhe (CHN)	15.400
7	Kyoichi Watanabe (JPN)	15.200
8	Kim Soo-myun (KOR)	15.100
9	Lü Bo (CHN)	15.000
10	Ryosuke Baba (JPN)	14.750
11	Takuya Nakase (JPN)	14.700
12	Anton Fokin (UZB)	14.600
13	Stepan Gorbachev (KAZ)	14.450
14	Ildar Valeyev (KAZ)	14.400
15	Yernar Yerimbetov (KAZ)	14.300
16	Shek Wai Hung (HKG)	14.250
17	Chen Yibing (CHN)	14.200
18	Hsu Ping-chien (TPE)	13.800
19	Kittipong Yudee (THA)	13.700
20	Ravshanbek Osimov (UZB)	13.650
21	Lum Wan Foong (MAS)	13.650
22	Phạm Phước Hưng (VIE)	13.650
23	Rartchawat Kaewpanya (THA)	13.550
24	Mahmood Al-Sadi (QAT)	13.500
25	Eduard Shaulov (KAZ)	13.450
26	Hoàng Cường (VIE)	13.450
27	Yoo Won-chul (KOR)	13.450
28	Otabek Masharipov (UZB)	13.400
29	Ehsan Khodadadi (IRI)	13.400
30	Ahmed Al-Dyani (QAT)	13.400
31	Lu Yan-ting (TPE)	13.300
32	Trương Minh Sang (VIE)	13.200
33	Weena Chokpaoumpai (THA)	13.050
34	Sin Seob (KOR)	13.000
35	Nguyễn Hà Thanh (VIE)	12.950
36	Chen Chih-yu (TPE)	12.900
37	Mohammad Ramezanpour (IRI)	12.900
38	Younes Zeighami (IRI)	12.900
39	Ashish Kumar (IND)	12.900
40	Rakesh Kumar Patra (IND)	12.750
41	Đặng Nam (VIE)	12.700
42	Huang Che-kuei (TPE)	12.650
43	Ganbatyn Erdenebold (MGL)	12.500
44	Mayank Srivastava (SRI)	12.500
45	Hadi Khanarinejad (IRI)	12.350
46	Timur Kurbanbayev (KAZ)	11.900
47	Ivan Olushev (UZB)	11.900
48	Amir Azami (IRI)	11.900
49	Tu Yu-chen (TPE)	11.800
50	Kim Hee-hoon (KOR)	11.750
51	Shinoj Muliyil (IND)	11.700
52	Alok Ranjan (IND)	11.650
53	Woranad Kaewpanya (THA)	11.400
54	Suriyen Chanduang (THA)	11.150
55	Ng Kiu Chung (HKG)	10.800
56	Tharindu Pathmaperuma (SRI)	10.700
57	Nadika Cooray (SRI)	10.400
58	Abdulaziz Al-Johani (KSA)	9.350
59	Habib Al-Swailah (KSA)	9.100
60	Ali Al-Khwaher (KSA)	5.550
61	Jasem Gazwi (KSA)	1.850

=== Final ===
Rank	Athlete	Score
1st place, gold medalist(s)	Zhang Chenglong (CHN)	16.225
2nd place, silver medalist(s)	Shun Kuwahara (JPN)	15.725
3rd place, bronze medalist(s)	Teng Haibin (CHN)	15.450
4	Kim Soo-myun (KOR)	15.125
5	Hisashi Mizutori (JPN)	14.775
5	Yernar Yerimbetov (KAZ)	14.775
7	Kim Ji-hoon (KOR)	14.150
8	Stepan Gorbachev (KAZ)	13.325
