= Igor Cassina =

Italian gymnast (born 1977)

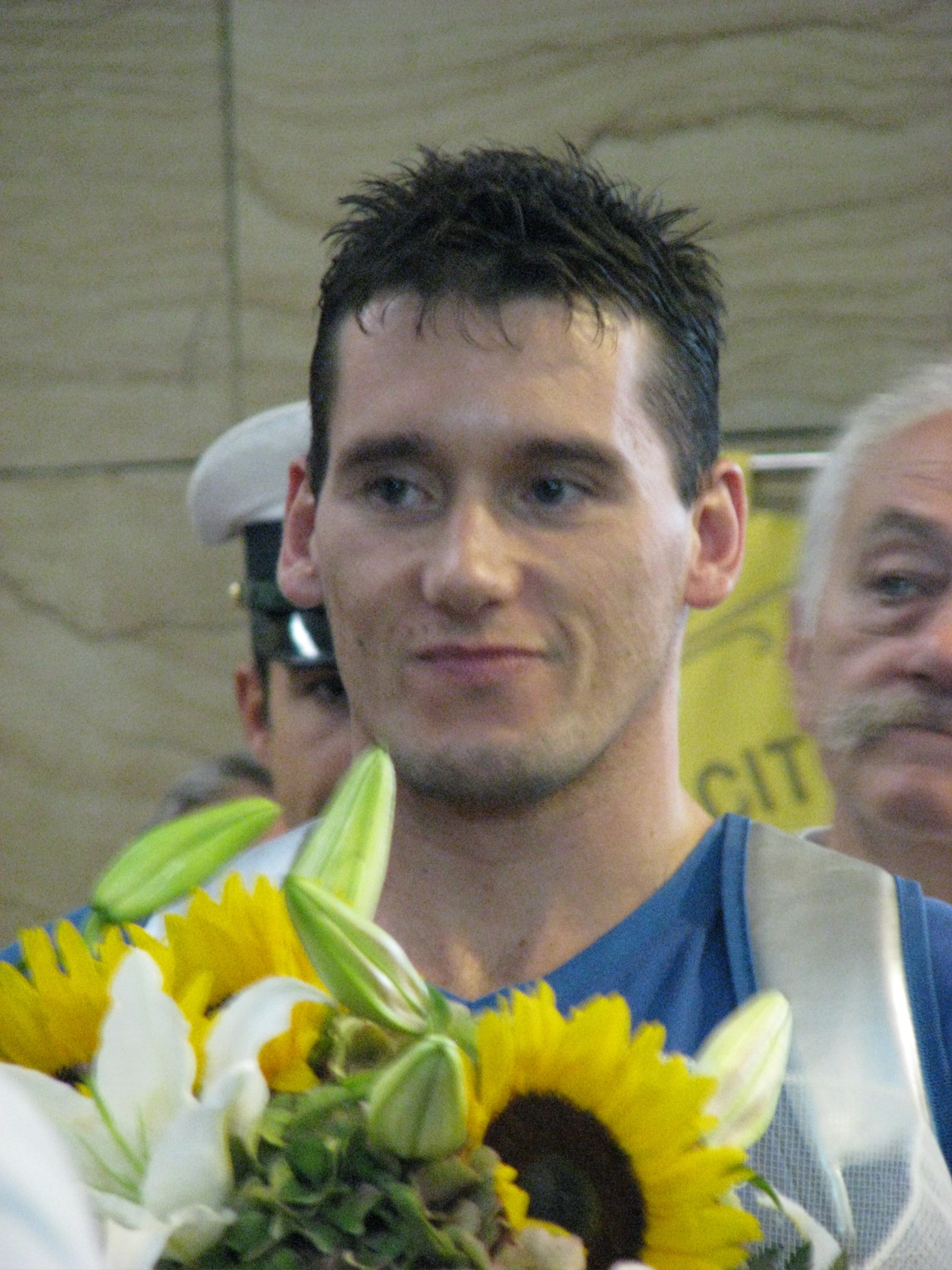
- Cassina in 2008

Personal information
- Born: 15 August 1977 (age 49) Seregno, Italy
- Height: 180 cm (5 ft 11 in)

Gymnastics career
- Discipline: Men's artistic gymnastics
- Country represented: Italy; (1994–2011)
- Eponymous skills: Cassina
Medal record
Olympic Games
Gold medal – first place	2004 Athens	Horizontal bar
World Championships
Silver medal – second place	2003 Anaheim	Horizontal bar
Bronze medal – third place	2009 London	Horizontal bar
European Championships
Silver medal – second place	2005 Debrecen	Horizontal bar
Bronze medal – third place	2002 Patras	Horizontal bar
Bronze medal – third place	2007 Amsterdam	Horizontal bar
Mediterranean Games
Silver medal – second place	2001 Tunis	Team
Bronze medal – third place	2001 Tunis	Pommel horse

Igor Cassina (Italian pronunciation: [ˈiːɡor kasˈsiːna]; born 15 August 1977) is an Italian gymnast. He is a three-time Olympian and won gold in the men's horizontal bar at the 2004 Summer Olympics in Athens.

== Biography ==
At the 2004 Summer Olympics, his competition saw a crowd protest over a low score for a routine by Alexei Nemov of Russia, which lasted for fifteen minutes until the score was raised. Despite this atmosphere, Cassina performed his exercise without major error, and he took the gold medal over Paul Hamm of the U.S., even though they tied. This gold was also the 500th Italian medal at the Summer Olympics. At the 2008 Summer Olympics he was 4th in the man's horizontal bar.

At the World Gymnastics Championships, he won the silver medal in Anaheim 2003 and the bronze in London 2009. At the European Gymnastics Championships, he won silver in Patras 2002 and Debrecen 2005 and bronze in Amsterdam 2007, always on the horizontal bar. Before winning the Olympic gold, Cassina had already made gymnastics history as the first to perform a giant Kovacs straight with 1/1 turn (also known as a Kõlman in the straight position), which the International Gymnastics Federation named Cassina after him as of 2002.

== Eponymous skills ==
Apparatus	Name	Description	Difficulty	Added to Code of Points
Horizontal bar	Cassina	Kovacs straight with 1/1 turn	G	2002 World Championships
