= Dmitri Drevin =

Russian artistic gymnast

- Full name: Dmitri Nikolayevich Drevin
- Born: 10 January 1982 (age 44) Cheboksary, RSFSR, USSR

Gymnastics career
- Discipline: Men's artistic gymnastics
- Country represented: Russia
Medal record
Representing Russia
Olympic Games
Bronze medal – third place	2000 Sydney	Team

Dmitri Nikolayevich Drevin (Russian: Дмитрий Николаевич Древин; born 10 January 1982) is a former Olympic gymnast who competed for Russia in the 2000 Olympic Games in Sydney, Australia, winning a bronze medal in the team competition.

== See also ==
- List of Olympic male artistic gymnasts for Russia
