= Khristian Ivanov =

Bulgarian gymnast (born 1977)

- Христиан Иванов
- Born: 24 January 1977 (age 49) Sofia, Bulgaria

Gymnastics career
- Discipline: Men's artistic gymnastics
- Country represented: Bulgaria

Khristian Ivanov (Bulgarian: Християн Иванов) (born 24 January 1977) is a Bulgarian gymnast. He competed at the 2000 Summer Olympics.
