= Carly Janiga =

American artistic gymnast

Carly Janiga', now Carly Reardon, (born October 19, 1988) is an American former gymnast. She attended and competed for Stanford University. She has won gold medals in FIG Artistic Gymnastics World Cup competition and was NCAA champion in the uneven bars in 2010. She was named the Pacific-10 Conference Scholar Athlete of the Year in 2010.

== USA Gymnastics ==
Janiga trained at the Desert Devils Gymnastics club in Mesa, Arizona under coach Geoff Eaton. She qualified for the Olympic trials in Anaheim, California in June 2004 at age 15. She finished ninth, qualifying for the final selection camp, but was not selected for the six-member team for the Athens Games. Her best event was floor exercise, featuring four 'E' element tumbling passes: a double layout, double Arabian tucked, piked full-in, and whip through to triple full.

NBC commentator Tim Daggett said of Janiga, "I don't pick the team, (national team coordinator) Marta Karolyi does, and Marta Karolyi likes her a lot". In late 2004, Janiga represented the United States in FIG Artistic Gymnastics World Cup competition. In September, Janiga competed at the Copa La Serena, held in La Serena, Chile, earning gold medals on vault and floor exercise and a silver medal on beam.

== NCAA Gymnastics ==
Janiga entered Stanford University in fall 2006 and competed in NCAA Women's Gymnastics championship each year until her graduation in 2010.

In 2007, Janiga was named first team All-American in the all-around, vault and floor exercise. She placed fourth in the all-around competition at the 2007 NCAA Women's Gymnastics Championships. She was also named Pacific-10 Conference 2007 Freshman of the Year.

Janiga also won five individual conference titles at Stanford: balance beam in 2008 and 2009, all-around and uneven bars in 2009 and floor exercise in 2010.

Janiga was the all-around champion at the South Central Regional Championships in 2009. She ended her Stanford career with a 2010 NCAA title on the uneven bars with a score of 9.9375, only the second NCAA individual title in Stanford's history. Stanford coach Kristen Smyth said, "Tonight, Carly was what she's been for Stanford for four years -- amazing and an absolute rock for our team and our program. She is going to be impossible to replace. I can't think of a better way for her to cap off her career than she did tonight."

== Personal life ==
Janiga graduated with a BA in psychology from Stanford University in 2010, and an MA in education in 2011 through the Stanford Teacher Education Program.
