= Mitja Petkovšek =

Slovenian gymnast (born 1977)

- Born: 6 February 1977 (age 49) Ljubljana, Slovenia
- Height: 167 cm (5 ft 6 in)

Gymnastics career
- Discipline: Men's artistic gymnastics
- Country represented: Slovenia
Medal record
Men's artistic gymnastics
Representing Slovenia
World Championships
Gold medal – first place	2005 Melbourne	Parallel bars
Gold medal – first place	2007 Stuttgart	Parallel bars
Silver medal – second place	2002 Debrecen	Parallel bars
European Championships
Gold medal – first place	2000 Bremen	Parallel bars
Gold medal – first place	2006 Volos	Parallel bars
Gold medal – first place	2007 Amsterdam	Parallel bars
Gold medal – first place	2008 Lausanne	Parallel bars
Silver medal – second place	1998 Saint Petersburg	Parallel bars
Silver medal – second place	2002 Patras	Parallel bars
Silver medal – second place	2009 Milan	Parallel bars
Bronze medal – third place	2005 Debrecen	Parallel bars
Bronze medal – third place	2012 Montpellier	Parallel bars
Summer Universiade
Bronze medal – third place	1997 Sicily	Parallel bars
Mediterranean Games
Gold medal – first place	2005 Almería	Parallel bars
Bronze medal – third place	2001 Tunis	Parallel bars

Mitja Petkovšek (born 6 February 1977) is a Slovenian former artistic gymnast. He was a specialist on the parallel bars and won two World titles on that apparatus (2005, 2007). He is also a four-time European parallel bars champion (2000, 2006–2008). He won a total of 12 World and European medals. He competed at the 2000 Summer Olympics and 2008 Summer Olympics.

== Gymnastics career ==
Petkovšek began gymnastics when he was six years old.

=== 1997–2000 ===
Petkovšek competed at his first World Championships in 1997 and finished 29th in the all-around final. He also qualified for the parallel bars final and finished fifth. He won his first European medal in 1998 when he finished second to Russia's Alexei Bondarenko on the parallel bars. He then won a parallel bars bronze medal at the 1998 Vancouver World Cup.

Petkovšek won the parallel bars titles at both the 2000 Glasgow and Ljubljana World Cups. He also won the parallel bars title at the 2000 European Championships with a score of 9.800. He represented Slovenia at the 2000 Summer Olympics and was favored to win a medal, but he fell off the parallel bars in the qualification round and did not advance to the final.

=== 2001–2004 ===
Petkovšek won the parallel bars bronze medal at the 2001 Mediterranean Games. He also won the bronze medal at the 2001 Cottbus World Cup. At the 2002 European Championships, he won the parallel bars silver medal behind Greece's Vasileios Tsolakidis. Then at the 2002 World Championships, he won the silver medal behind China's Li Xiaopeng.

Petkovšek won gold medals at the 2003 Paris, Glasgow, and Stuttgart World Cups. He advanced to the parallel bars final at the 2003 World Championships and finished eighth. He finished fifth at the 2004 European Championships after a mistake that lowered his start-value to a 9.800.

=== 2005–2007 ===
At the 2005 European Championships, Petkovšek won the parallel bars bronze medal behind Manuel Carballo and Yann Cucherat despite competing with an arm injury. He then won the gold medal at the 2005 Mediterranean Games. He won the gold medal on the parallel bars at the 2005 World Championships with a score of 9.700. The same day, Aljaž Pegan won the gold medal on the horizontal bar, and they became the first Slovenian World champions in gymnastics since Miroslav Cerar won the pommel horse title in 1970.

Petkovšek won the parallel bars title at the 2006 European Championships with a score of 16.025 under the new scoring system. He successfully defended his title at the 2007 European Championships. He then tied with South Korea's Kim Dae-eun for the title at the 2007 World Championships. His World title also earned him a berth for the 2008 Summer Olympics.

=== 2008–2012 ===
Petkovšek won the parallel bars European title for the third year in a row. He then represented Slovenia at the 2008 Summer Olympics and finished fifth in the parallel bars final after wobbling on two handstands. At the 2009 European Championships, he won the silver medal on the parallel bars behind France's Yann Cucherat by 0.025 points. He competed at the 2009 World Championships but did not advance to the final. He also did not advance to the final at the 2010 World Championships.

Petkovšek qualified for the parallel bars final at the 2011 European Championships but fell and finished eighth. He won the gold medal at the 2012 Osijek World Challenge Cup. Then at the 2012 European Championships, he won the bronze medal behind Marcel Nguyen and Oleg Verniaiev.

=== 2013–2015 ===
Petkovšek finished 13th in the qualification round at the 2013 World Championships, making him the second reserve for the final. He won the parallel bars bronze medal at the 2014 Cottbus World Cup. He then fell and finished seventh at the 2014 European Championships.

Petkovšek withdrew from the 2015 European Championships due to a back injury. He announced his retirement in October 2015 at the age of 38.

== Personal life ==
Petkovšek is married to Mojca Rode, a Slovenian rhythmic gymnast. They have two daughters together, named Gaja and Asja.
