= Georgy Grebenkov =

Russian gymnast (born 1982)

- Born: 8 January 1982 (age 44) Leningrad, Russian SFSR, Soviet Union
- Height: 172 cm (5 ft 8 in)

Gymnastics career
- Discipline: Men's artistic gymnastics
- Country represented: Russia
- Club: Dynamo St. Petersburg

Georgy Grebenkov (born 8 January 1982) is a Russian gymnast. He competed at the 2004 Summer Olympics. In 1998, he won the silver medal in the men's junior all-around event at the 1998 European Men's Artistic Gymnastics Championships held in Saint Petersburg, Russia.

== See also ==
- List of Olympic male artistic gymnasts for Russia
