= Andreas Schweizer =

Swiss gymnast

- Born: 26 September 1979 (age 47) Wetzikon, Switzerland
- Height: 1.72 m (5 ft 8 in)

Gymnastics career
- Discipline: Men's artistic gymnastics
- Country represented: Switzerland
- Gym: Sport- und Turnverein Wetzikon

Andreas Schweizer (born 26 September 1979) is a Swiss former gymnast. He competed at the 2004 Summer Olympics where he finished eighth in the still rings final and twenty-fourth in the all around final.
