= Li Ya =

Chinese artistic gymnast (born 1988)

- Full name: Li Ya
- Born: June 13, 1988 (age 38) Bengbu, Anhui
- Height: 156 cm (5 ft 1 in)

Gymnastics career
- Discipline: Women's artistic gymnastics
- Country represented: China
- Head coaches: Liu Guicheng, He Hua
- Choreographer: Ou Yangqin
- Music: Duez-Bond
- Eponymous skills: "Li Ya salto" and "Li Ya dismount"(uneven bars)
- Retired: 2008
Medal record
World Championships
Gold medal – first place	2006 Aarhus	Team
World Cup Final
Gold medal – first place	2006 São Paulo	Balance Beam
Silver medal – second place	2006 São Paulo	Uneven Bars
Silver medal – second place	2004 Birmingham	Balance Beam
Bronze medal – third place	2004 Birmingham	Uneven Bars

Li Ya (simplified Chinese: 李娅; traditional Chinese: 李婭; pinyin: Lǐ Yà; born June 13, 1988, in Bengbu, Anhui) is a former Chinese gymnast. She was a member of the Chinese team that won the team competition at the 2006 World Championships and competed in the World Championships in Anaheim and was also a member of the 2004 Olympic Team. During her career, she was an uneven bars and balance beam specialist.

Li Ya has two moves named after her in the Code of Points: the "Li Ya salto", which is a straddled Jaeger 1/2 release (which she usually connected to a straddled Jaeger), and the "Li Ya dismount", which is an Arabian double-front in a piked position. Li retired from the national team in 2008.

== Biography ==
Li Ya is the 2004 National Champion on the uneven bars as well as the 2004 National All Around Silver Medalist. She had a great deal of success in the 2004 World Cup Circuit despite a bad showing at the 2004 Olympics. In the team final in the 2004 Summer Olympics in Athens she fell twice on beam scoring an 8.300 (once on her front flip and then underrotated on her double back dismount and put her hands down). Then in the event finals, she fell again on her front flip and scored a 9.050 (ranking 7th). She won the uneven bars title at the Glasgow and Ghent World Cup Qualifiers. She also won a bronze medal at the 2004 Glasgow World Cup Qualifier. In December 2004 Li Ya qualified to the World Cup Final in Birmingham. She was the most successful Chinese female gymnast at the World Cup Final. She won a bronze medal on the uneven bars and a silver medal on the balance beam.

Li was briefly injured in 2005, but recovered in time to win silver medals at the 2005 Chinese National Championships and the 2005 Britain vs China Dual Meet on the uneven bars. In October, she competed at the National Games but did not win any medals. A few weeks later, she was part of China's winning team at the East Asia Games in Macau, where she also won a gold medal on the uneven bars. She was not selected for the 2005 World Championships in Melbourne.

She competed in the 2006 Tournament of Masters in Cottbus, a world cup event, and won the gold medal on the uneven bars. In this event, she pioneered a difficult release-release combination, a Jaeger with a half turn directly into a Jaeger. The Jaegar with 1/2 turn release was later named for her. Li also qualified for the beam final and finished in fourth place, due to a mistake on her first skill.

She competed at the 2006 World Championships in Aarhus, Denmark where she was a member of the Chinese team that won the gold medal in the women's team event.

After this competition, Li Ya was not named to the team for the 2006 Asian Games in Doha, Qatar. However, she had one more chance, having qualified for bars and beam in the World Cup Finals in Brazil, held in December. She hit her routines at this competition, winning silver on bars behind world champion Beth Tweddle, and winning gold on the balance beam.

In 2007, Li Ya competed in the Maribor World Cup where she placed 2nd on balance beam and 1st on the uneven bars.

She announced her retirement in 2008.

== Eponymous Skills ==
Li has an uneven bars release move and a dismount named after her in the Code of Points.

Apparatus	Name	Description	Difficulty (Note: Valid for the 2025–2028 Code of Points)
Uneven bars	Li Ya	Jaeger salto straddled with ½ turn (180°) to hang on high bar	D (0.4)
Uneven bars	Giovannini-Li Ya	Swing forward with ½ turn (180°) to double salto forward piked	E (0.5)

== Competitive history ==
=== 2007 season ===
Year	Competition Description	Location	Apparatus	Rank-Final	Score-Final	Rank-Qualifying	Score-Qualifying
2007	World Cup/Series	Maribor	Balance Beam	2	14.350	8	14.000
2007	World Cup/Series	Maribor	Uneven Bar	1	16.025	1	15.500

=== 2006 season ===
Year	Competition Description	Location	Apparatus	Rank-Final	Score-Final	Rank-Qualifying	Score-Qualifying
2006	World Championships	Aarhus	All Around			188	28.425
2006	World Championships	Aarhus	Balance Beam			65	13.975
2006	World Championships	Aarhus	Team	1	182.200	2	239.525
2006	World Championships	Aarhus	Uneven Bars			32	14.450
2006	World Cup/Series	Cottbus	Balance Beam	4	14.800		
2006	World Cup/Series	Cottbus	Uneven Bars	1	15.800		
2006	World Cup/Series	Ghent	Uneven Bar	1	15.725		
2006	World Cup/Series	Shanghai	Balance Beam	2	15.450		
2006	World Cup/Series	São Paulo	Balance Beam	1	15.625		
2006	World Cup/Series	São Paulo	Uneven Bar	2	16.225		

=== 2004 season ===
Year	Competition Description	Location	Apparatus	Rank-Final	Score-Final	Rank-Qualifying	Score-Qualifying
2004	Olympic Games	Athens	All Around			65	28.412
2004	Olympic Games	Athens	Balance Beam	7	9.050	6	9.600
2004	Olympic Games	Athens	Team	7	110.008	3	151.085
2004	Olympic Games	Athens	Uneven Bars	5	9.562	3	9.675
2004	World Cup/Series Final	Birmingham	Balance Beam	2	9.612		
2004	World Cup/Series Final	Birmingham	Uneven Bar	3	9.600		
2004	World Cup/Series	Glasgow	Balance Beam	3	9.325		
2004	World Cup/Series	Glasgow	Uneven Bar	1	9.500		
2004	World Cup/Series	Ghent	Balance Beam	4	9.375		
2004	World Cup/Series	Ghent	Uneven Bar	1	9.712		

=== 2003 season ===
Year	Competition Description	Location	Apparatus	Rank-Final	Score-Final	Rank-Qualifying	Score-Qualifying
2003	World Championships	Anaheim	Balance Beam	4	9.450		
2003	World Championships	Anaheim	Team	4	110.259	1	148.671

== Floor Music ==
- 2004-2006 "Duel" by Bond
