= Pavel Gofman =

Israeli gymnast

- לבאפ ןמפוג
- Born: 26 November 1979 (age 46) Voroshilovgrad, Ukrainian SSR, Soviet Union
- Height: 1.65 m (5 ft 5 in)

Gymnastics career
- Discipline: Men's artistic gymnastics
- Country represented: Israel

Pavel Gofman (Hebrew: פבל גופמן; born 26 November 1979) is a USSR-born Israeli gymnast. He competed at the 2004 Summer Olympics where he finished nineteenth in the all-around final.
