= Gervasio Deferr =

Spanish gymnast (born 1980)

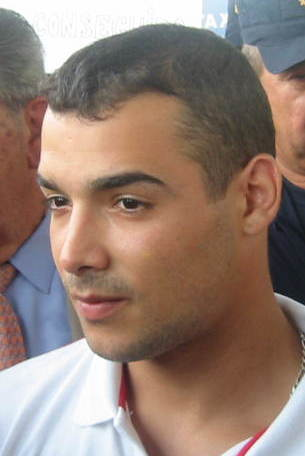
- Deferr arriving home from the 2004 Summer Olympics

Personal information
- Full name: Gervasio Deferr Ángel
- Born: 7 November 1980 (age 46) Premià de Mar, Barcelona, Spain
- Height: 166 cm (5 ft 5 in)

Gymnastics career
- Discipline: Men's artistic gymnastics
- Country represented: Spain
- Retired: 2011
Medal record
Olympic Games
Gold medal – first place	2000 Sydney	Vault
Gold medal – first place	2004 Athens	Vault
Silver medal – second place	2008 Beijing	Floor exercise
World Championships
Silver medal – second place	1999 Tianjin	Floor exercise
Silver medal – second place	2007 Stuttgart	Floor exercise
Disqualified	2002 Debrecen	Floor exercise
World Cup
Gold medal – first place	2000 Glasgow	Floor Exercise
Silver medal – second place	2000 Glasgow	Vault
European Championships
Silver medal – second place	2000 Bremen	Floor exercise

Gervasio Deferr Ángel (born 7 November 1980) is a Spanish former artistic gymnast who competed at three Olympic Games. He is a two-time Olympic champion on the vault (2000, 2004) and an Olympic silver medalist on the floor exercise (2008). He is also the 1999 and 2007 World silver medalist on the floor exercise.

== Gymnastics career ==
Deferr competed at the 1997 World Championships and finished seventh in the floor exercise final. Then at the 1999 World Championships, he won the silver medal behind Russia's Alexei Nemov. Later that same year, he won the vault competitions at the Glasgow and Stuttgart World Cups. He won the silver medal on the floor exercise at the 2000 Ljubljana World Cup.

Deferr won the floor exercise silver medal at the 2000 European Championships, behind Marian Drăgulescu. He then represented Spain at the 2000 Summer Olympics and won the vault gold medal, becoming Spain's first Olympic medalist in artistic gymnastics. Later that year, he won another vault gold medal at the World Cup final, where he also won the floor exercise silver medal.

At the 2001 Paris World Cup, Deferr won the gold medal in the floor exercise. He initially won the silver medal on the floor exercise at the 2002 World Championships, but the medal was stripped after he tested positive for cannabis.

At the 2004 Summer Olympics, Deferr successfully defended his vault title, and he also placed fourth in the floor exercise final. He competed on the vault at the 2005 World Championships but did not advance to the finals. He did advance into the floor exercise final at the 2006 World Championships and placed fourth.

Deferr won the silver medal on the floor exercise at the 2007 World Championships, behind Diego Hypólito. He then represented Spain at the 2008 Summer Olympics and won the floor exercise silver medal, behind Zou Kai.

In January 2011, Deferr announced his retirement.
