= Isao Yoneda =

Japanese artistic gymnast

- Full name: Isao Yoneda
- Born: August 20, 1977 (age 49) Hamburg, Germany
- Height: 173 cm (5 ft 8 in)

Gymnastics career
- Discipline: Men's artistic gymnastics
- Country represented: Japan
- Club: Tokushukai Gymnastics Club
- Head coach: Yasunori Tachibana
- Retired: July 2008
Medal record
Representing Japan
Olympic Games
Gold medal – first place	2004 Athens	Team
Bronze medal – third place	2004 Athens	Horizontal bar
Asian Games
Bronze medal – third place	1998 Bangkok	Team

Isao Yoneda (米田 功); (born August 20, 1977, in Hamburg, Germany) is a Japanese gymnast. He was raised in Tokyo. He is the 2004 Summer Olympics gold medalist in the team event and the bronze medalist in the high bar.
