= Oleksandr Beresch =

Ukrainian artistic gymnast (1977–2004)

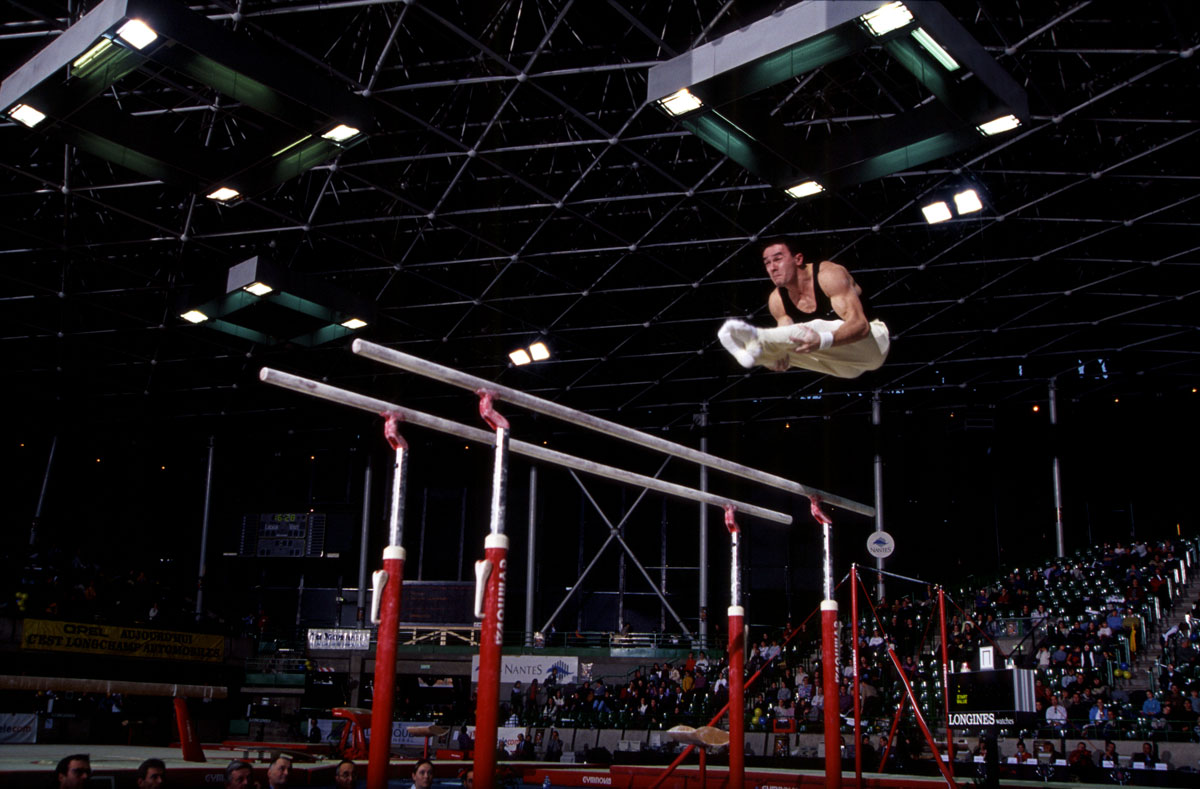
- Born: 12 October 1977 Pervomaisk, Ukrainian SSR, Soviet Union
- Died: 29 February 2004 (aged 26) Kyiv, Ukraine

Gymnastics career
- Discipline: Men's artistic gymnastics
- Country represented: Ukraine
Medal record
Olympic Games
Silver medal – second place	2000 Sydney	Team competition
Bronze medal – third place	2000 Sydney	All-around
World Championships
Silver medal – second place	2001 Ghent	Horizontal Bar
Bronze medal – third place	1997 Lausanne	Horizontal Bar
Bronze medal – third place	2001 Ghent	Pommel Horse
Bronze medal – third place	2001 Ghent	Team competition
World Cup Final
Gold medal – first place	2000 Glasgow	Horizontal Bar
European Championships
Gold medal – first place	2000 Bremen	All-around
Gold medal – first place	2000 Bremen	Horizontal Bar
Bronze medal – third place	2000 Bremen	Pommel Horse
Bronze medal – third place	2000 Bremen	Team
European Team Championships
Silver medal – second place	2001 Riesa	Team
Silver medal – second place	2003 Moscow	Team
Summer Universiade
Gold medal – first place	1999 Mallorca	All-Around

Oleksandr Beresch (Ukrainian: Олександр Береш; 12 October 1977, Pervomaisk – 29 February 2004, Kyiv) was a gymnast from Ukraine and Olympic medallist at the 2000 Sydney Games.

Coached by former Soviet World Champion Igor Korobchinsky, Beresch began competing internationally for Ukraine in 1997, winning a bronze medal on the high bar at his first World Championships. Over the next several years he became the preeminent male gymnast on the Ukrainian team, medalling at the World Cup several times.

Beresch's breakout year was 2000; in this year he was the European all-around and high bar champion, as well as the bronze all-around medalist at the 2000 Olympics. His contributions to the Ukrainian team helped them win their first team medal, a silver, in Sydney. He continued to turn in strong performances after the Olympics, winning three medals at the 2001 World Artistic Gymnastics Championships and winning the high bar gold at the 2000 World finals in Paris.

== Accident ==
In February 2004, when Beresch was driving through Kyiv, his Peugeot was struck by a speeding car travelling at over 150 kilometres per hour. He was killed; his passenger, teammate Sergei Vyaltsev, survived with critical injuries.

Beresch's death was met with shock and sorrow by the international gymnastics community. Former Ukrainian Gymnastics Federation president Ludmilla Tourischeva issued a public statement, saying "there are no words to express our grief." Several memorials to Beresch were held, including an emotional video tribute at the 2004 European Championships.

== Sources ==
- Profile at International Gymnast
- "Romanian men Europe's best" Inside Gymnastics magazine, 16 April 2004
- "Beresch loses life" Inside Gymnastics magazine, 1 March 2004
