= Ivan Ivankov =

Belarusian artistic gymnast (born 1975)

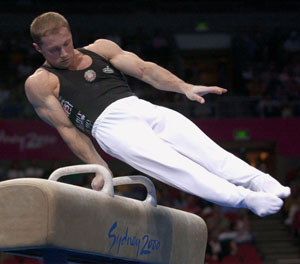
- Ivankov at the 2000 Sydney Olympics

Personal information
- Born: 10 April 1975 (age 51) Minsk, Byelorussian SSR, Soviet Union
- Height: 167 cm (5 ft 6 in)

Gymnastics career
- Discipline: Men's artistic gymnastics
- Country represented: Belarus
- Former countries represented: Soviet Union
- Head coaches: Vladimir Vatkin; Viktor Doylidov; Yuri Koval
- Retired: 2006
Medal record
World Championships
Gold medal – first place	1994 Brisbane	All-around
Gold medal – first place	1997 Lausanne	All-around
Gold medal – first place	2001 Ghent	Team
Silver medal – second place	1997 Lausanne	Team
Silver medal – second place	2001 Ghent	All-around
Silver medal – second place	2002 Debrecen	High bar
Bronze medal – third place	1993 Birmingham	Still rings
Bronze medal – third place	1994 Brisbane	High bar
Bronze medal – third place	1997 Lausanne	Still rings
Bronze medal – third place	1999 Tianjin	Team
Bronze medal – third place	2001 Ghent	Parallel bars
World Cup Final
Gold medal – first place	1998 Sabae	High bar
Silver medal – second place	1998 Sabae	Still rings
Bronze medal – third place	2000 Glasgow	Still rings
Bronze medal – third place	2000 Glasgow	High bar
European Championships
Gold medal – first place	1994 Prague	All-around
Gold medal – first place	1994 Prague	Team
Gold medal – first place	1996 Copenhagen	All-around
Silver medal – second place	1994 Prague	Floor exercise
Silver medal – second place	1996 Copenhagen	Floor exercise
Silver medal – second place	1996 Copenhagen	Pommel horse
Silver medal – second place	2000 Bremen	All-around
Silver medal – second place	2000 Bremen	High bar
Silver medal – second place	2000 Bremen	Parallel bars
Bronze medal – third place	1996 Copenhagen	Team
Bronze medal – third place	2000 Bremen	Still rings
Bronze medal – third place	2006 Volos	Team
Bronze medal – third place	2006 Volos	Parallel bars
European Team Championships
Gold medal – first place	1997 Paris	Team
Summer Universiade
Gold medal – first place	1999 Palma de Mallorca	Rings

Ivan Aleksandrovich Ivankov (Note: Russian: Ива́н Алекса́ндрович Иванко́в; Belarusian: Іван Аляксандравіч Іванкоў, Łacinka: Ivan Aliaksandravič Ivankoŭ) (born 10 April 1975) is a retired Belarusian artistic gymnast. He became one of the most decorated Belarusian gymnasts while competing internationally between 1990 and 2006. Ivankov was the all-around World Champion in 1994 and 1997, and the all-around European Champion in 1994 and 1996. He won a total of eleven medals at the World Championships. He also represented Belarus at three Olympics (1996, 2000, and 2004), though he never won an Olympic medal. Since his retirement from competition, he has worked as a coach in the United States. Ivankov was inducted into the International Gymnastics Hall of Fame in 2019.

== Early life ==
Ivankov was born in Minsk, Soviet Belarus, on 10 April 1975. He began gymnastics at the age of 6, and by the time he was 14, was a member of the Soviet national junior team, training at the prestigious Round Lake national gymnastics center.

== Gymnastics career ==
Ivankov established himself as a top up-and-coming gymnast at the 1991 Junior European Championships in Greece, where he won the all-around, pommel horse, high bar, vault and rings titles, and earned a silver medal on floor.

=== 1992–1996 ===
Following the breakup of the Soviet Union, Ivankov began representing Belarus. He competed at both the 1992 Junior European Championships, where he helped the Belarusian team to a gold medal finish, and the senior European Championships in Budapest, where he placed 13th in the all-around. He competed in his first World Championships in 1993, where he won a bronze medal on the rings.

1994 was Ivankov's breakout year. At the 1994 World Championships in Brisbane, he won the all-around gold, defeating reigning Olympic champion and teammate Vitaly Scherbo in the process. The same year, Ivankov won his first all-around senior European Championships title and placed well in other international competitions.

Competing on the vault in Brisbane, Ivankov suffered an injury to his Achilles tendon. The injury forced him to miss the 1995 World Championships in Sabae, but he recovered sufficiently to win his second European Championships in 1996 and was considered to be a major medal threat for the 1996 Olympics in Atlanta. However, after arriving in Atlanta, Ivankov's Achilles snapped as he was walking across a parking lot, ending his Olympic bid.

=== 1997–2004 ===
Ivankov's Achilles injury required serious rehabilitation, reconstructive surgery and muscle grafts, and months of physical therapy. His condition was considered to be career-ending; however, only a year after rupturing his Achilles, Ivankov returned to win his second all-around gold medal at the 1997 World Championships. One year later, he won the all-around at the Goodwill Games in New York City.

In 2000, Ivankov competed in the 2000 Olympics where he finished 4th in the all-around, and 5th in the individual parallel bars and still rings event finals.

In 2001, Ivankov led the Belarusian team to the gold medal at the World Championships in Ghent, Belgium. Individually, he finished second all-around, just shy of an unprecedented third world all-around title.

Two years later, Belarus finished 13th at the World Championships in Anaheim, failing to qualify a full team to the 2004 Olympics in Athens. Ivankov competed in Athens as an individual.

After competing at the 2005 and 2006 World Championships, Ivankov decided to retire from international competition. He still performs in exhibitions worldwide.

=== Post-gymnastics career ===
Ivankov resided in Oklahoma and coached at the Bart Conner Gymnastics Academy. In 2009, he accepted a coaching job for the Illinois Fighting Illini men's gymnastics team. In 2012, he was awarded the National Assistant Coach of the Year award as the Fighting Illini won the 2012 NCAA Men's Gymnastics Championship. As of 2019, he is also now a coach for Champions Gymnastics Academy in Katy, TX.

In 2019, he was inducted into the International Gymnastics Hall of Fame, which described him as "the prototype of the ideal gymnast."

In December 2025, he visited his former gymnastics school in Minsk, Belarus. In an interview, he said that Belarusian athletes having to compete under the title of Individual Neutral Athletes is a "humiliation," and that it was because international sporting federations were "putting a spoke in the wheels."

== Personal life ==
In 2001, Ivankov married Suzyanna, an aerobics instructor and Belarusian television personality. They divorced in 2007, and he remarried the same year. In 2001, Ivankov was named godfather to Alexei Nemov's son. Ivankov has a son and is currently married to his second wife, Valentina.
