= Gymnastics at the 2000 Summer Olympics – Men's artistic individual all-around =

Olympic gymnastics event

Men's artistic individual all-around at the Games of the XXVII Olympiad
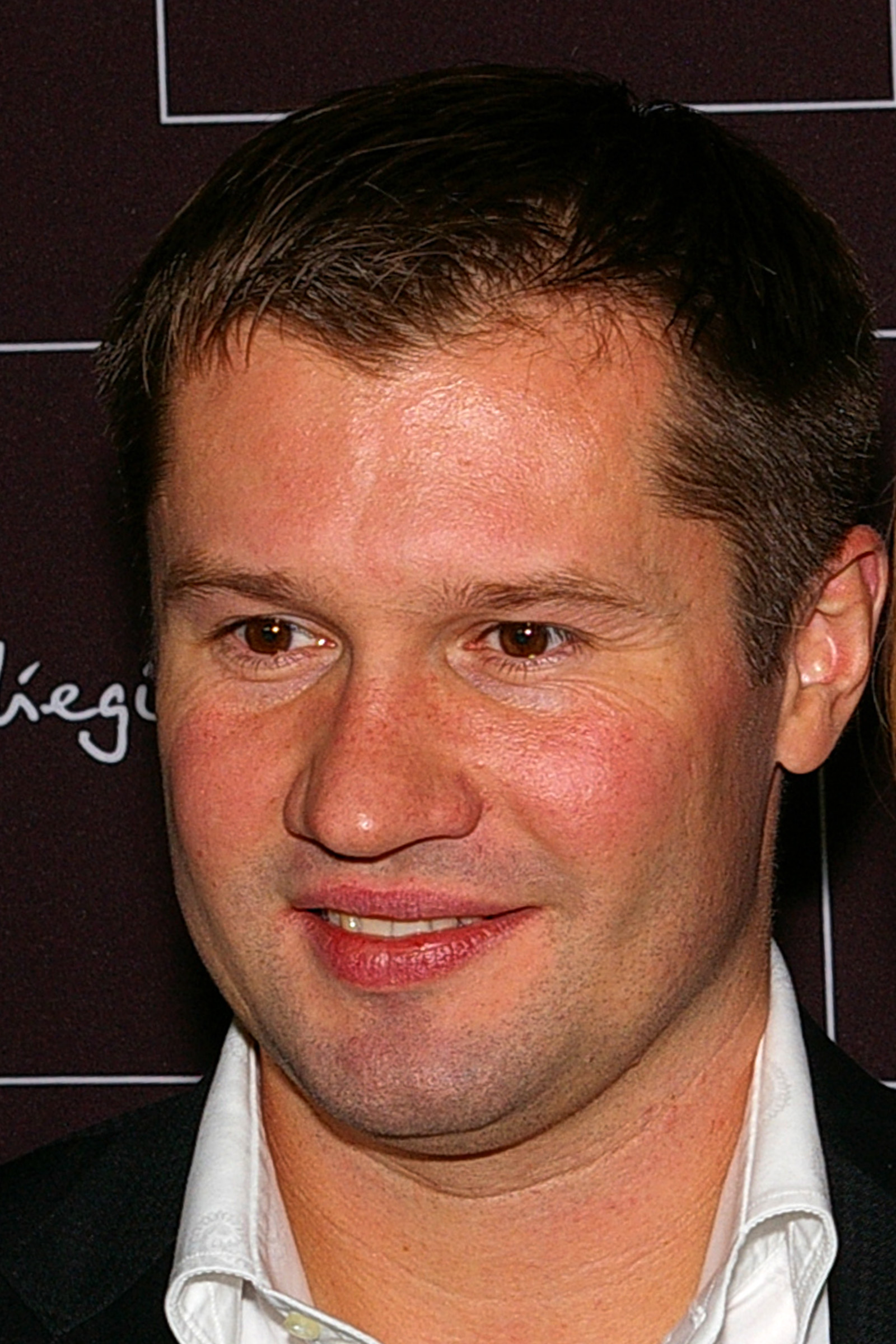
- Gold medalist Alexei Nemov
- Venue: Sydney Super Dome
- Dates: 16–20 September 2000
- Competitors: 97 from 32 nations
- Winning score: 58.474

Medalists
1st place, gold medalist(s)		Alexei Nemov; Russia
2nd place, silver medalist(s)		Yang Wei; China
3rd place, bronze medalist(s)		Oleksandr Beresch; Ukraine

The men's individual all-around competition was one of eight events for male competitors in artistic gymnastics at the 2000 Summer Olympics in Sydney. The qualification and final rounds took place on September 16 and 20 at the Sydney SuperDome. There were 97 competitors from 32 nations. Each nation could enter a team of 6 gymnasts (returning to the longstanding team size after one Games of teams of 7 in 1996) or up to 2 individual gymnasts. The event was won by Alexei Nemov of Russia, the nation's first victory in the event. Nemov, with a silver medal in 1996, became the 12th man to earn multiple medals in the all-around. Yang Wei of China took silver. Oleksandr Beresch earned bronze, Ukraine's first medal in the event.

== Background ==
This was the 23rd appearance of the men's individual all-around. The first individual all-around competition had been held in 1900, after the 1896 competitions featured only individual apparatus events. A men's individual all-around has been held every Games since 1900.

Three of the top 10 gymnasts from the 1996 Games returned: silver medalist Alexei Nemov of Russia, seventh-place finisher John Roethlisberger of the United States, and tenth-place finisher Blaine Wilson of the United States. Russia's Nikolai Kryukov was the reigning (1999) World Champion; Ivan Ivankov of Belarus had won the 1997 World Championship.

Latvia made its debut in the event. France made its 21st appearance, most among nations.

== Competition format ==
Major changes to the competition format were implemented in 2000. The competition continued to use a preliminary (qualifying) round and a final round, with scores cleared between rounds (no carryover). However, the preliminary round now used only one optional exercise for each apparatus rather than requiring both a compulsory and optional exercise. The team event scoring used a 6–5–4 format (each team had 6 gymnasts, selected 5 per apparatus, with 4 scores counting), a reduced version of the 1996 7–6–5 system, which reduced the number of gymnasts competing in every apparatus. Total scores and an overall rank were still used for all gymnasts, however. 2000 was also the year where the tie-breaking rules came into effect, which resulted in far less tie rankings or duplicate of medals than at the Games before that. Each exercise was scored from 0 to 10; thus the total preliminary score was from 0 to 60. The final total, with six exercises, was from 0 to 60.

== Schedule ==
All times are Australian Eastern Standard Time (UTC+10)

Date	Time	Round
Saturday, 16 September 2000	10:30	Qualifying
Wednesday, 20 September 2000	19:00	Final

== Results ==
There were 97 gymnasts that competed during the qualification round on September 16, though only 52 competed on each apparatus. Fifty-three gymnasts competed in the all-around during the qualification round. The thirty-six highest scoring gymnasts advanced to the final on September 16. Each country was limited to three competitors in the final.

Rank	Gymnast	Nation	Prelim	Floor (gymnastics)	Pommel horse	Rings (gymnastics)	Vault (gymnastics)	Parallel bars	Horizontal bar	Total
1st place, gold medalist(s)	Alexei Nemov	Russia	58.361	9.800	9.775	9.687	9.650	9.775	9.787	58.474
2nd place, silver medalist(s)	Yang Wei	China	57.449	9.700	9.750	9.712	9.712	9.750	9.737	58.361
3rd place, bronze medalist(s)	Oleksandr Beresch	Ukraine	58.049	9.675	9.762	9.550	9.675	9.750	9.800	58.212
4	Ivan Ivankov	Belarus	56.949	9.575	9.725	9.762	9.500	9.700	9.762	58.024
5	Oleksandr Svetlichny	Ukraine	57.286	9.600	9.675	9.525	9.725	9.725	9.700	57.950
6	Blaine Wilson	United States	56.861	9.700	9.587	9.612	9.800	9.712	9.525	57.936
7	Alexei Bondarenko	Russia	57.812	9.637	9.725	9.712	9.400	9.675	9.775	57.924
8	Yordan Yovchev	Bulgaria	57.599	9.550	9.737	9.750	9.475	9.675	9.700	57.887
9	Lihui Zheng	China	57.311	9.612	9.650	9.575	9.612	9.675	9.350	57.474
10	Lee Joo-Hyung	South Korea	55.986	9.237	9.650	9.600	9.525	9.750	9.700	57.462
11	Rareș Orzața	Romania	56.560	9.312	9.612	9.637	9.662	9.462	9.700	57.385
12	Yoshihiro Saito	Japan	56.487	9.512	9.600	9.662	9.437	9.425	9.725	57.361
13	Marian Drăgulescu	Romania	57.349	9.637	9.300	9.562	9.562	9.487	9.550	57.098
14	Paul Hamm	United States	57.436	9.675	9.612	9.550	9.587	9.750	8.875	57.049
15	Dimitri Karbanenko	France	56.424	9.450	9.125	9.425	9.612	9.712	9.637	56.961
16	Yann Cucherat	France	56.323	9.262	9.662	9.575	9.212	9.612	9.600	56.923
17	Eric López	Cuba	56.574	8.662	9.600	9.675	9.687	9.612	9.575	56.811
18	Naoya Tsukahara	Japan	56.985	9.362	8.425	9.650	9.562	9.662	9.762	56.423
19	Maxim Aleshin	Russia	56.274	9.325	9.000	9.412	9.412	9.550	9.700	56.399
20	Benjamin Varonian	France	56.161	9.500	8.887	9.550	8.987	9.725	9.712	56.361
21	Dimitrij Nonin	Germany	56.049	8.937	9.437	9.587	9.012	9.587	9.750	56.310
22	Cho Seong-Min	South Korea	56.937	9.262	9.250	9.550	9.600	9.662	8.900	56.224
23	Aleksei Sinkevich	Belarus	56.622	8.750	9.587	9.500	9.137	9.575	9.512	56.061
24	Dimitar Lountchev	Bulgaria	54.948	9.037	9.562	9.075	9.375	9.437	9.525	56.011
25	Kenichi Fujita	Japan	56.560	9.512	9.637	9.600	9.575	8.750	8.800	55.874
26	Omar Cortés	Spain	55.061	8.112	9.675	9.550	9.325	9.537	9.650	55.849
27	Roman Zozulya	Ukraine	55.923	8.812	9.625	9.687	9.162	8.925	9.600	55.811
28	Ioan Suciu	Romania	56.773	8.712	9.725	9.325	9.212	9.400	9.412	55.786
29	Philippe Rizzo	Australia	54.123	9.350	9.637	8.775	9.087	9.187	9.750	55.786
30	Lazaro Lamelas	Cuba	55.722	8.775	9.262	9.437	9.262	9.275	9.575	55.586
31	Víctor Cano	Spain	55.748	9.087	9.650	9.462	8.825	8.875	9.662	55.561
32	Craig Heap	Great Britain	54.511	9.112	9.262	9.450	9.037	9.275	9.212	55.348
33	Ivan Pavlovsky	Belarus	56.374	8.925	9.500	9.312	9.437	8.375	9.362	54.911
34	Alejandro Barrenechea	Spain	54.911	8.162	8.612	9.575	9.237	9.587	9.237	54.410
35	Alberto Busnari	Italy	54.686	8.300	9.550	8.400	8.362	9.537	9.662	53.811
36	Igor Cassina	Italy	54.111	7.837	9.350	8.412	9.175	8.812	9.687	53.373
37	Ilia Giorgadze	Georgia	56.948	DNS						
38	Jeong Jin-su	South Korea	56.574	DNS						
39	Andreas Wecker	Germany	56.011	DNS						
40	Igors Vihrovs	Latvia	56.186	DNS						
41	Stephen McCain	United States	55.686	DNS						
42	Florentin Pescaru	Romania	55.823	Did not advance—3 per nation rule						
43	Yevgeny Podgorny	Russia	56.273	Did not advance—3 per nation rule						
44	Dieter Rehm	Switzerland	54.423	Did not advance—3 per nation rule						
45	Saúl Cofiño	Spain	54.286	Did not advance—3 per nation rule						
46	Flemming Solberg	Norway	53.975	Did not advance						
47	Damian Istria	Australia	53.973	Did not advance						
48	Kim Dong-hwa	South Korea	53.124	Did not advance						
48	Diego Lizardi	Puerto Rico	52.261	Did not advance						
50	Rúnar Alexandersson	Iceland	52.149	Did not advance						
51	Lin Yung-hsi	Chinese Taipei	51.674	Did not advance						
52	David Phillips	New Zealand	49.461	Did not advance						
53	Pae Gil-su	North Korea	48.411	Did not advance						
54	Li Xiaopeng	China	47.962	Did not advance						
55	Xing Aowei	China	47.574	Did not advance						
56	Nikolay Kryukov	Russia	47.336	Did not advance						
57	Morgan Hamm	United States	47.262	Did not advance						
58	Mutsumi Harada	Japan	46.974	Did not advance						
59	Valeriy Honcharov	Ukraine	46.611	Did not advance						
60	Jan-Peter Nikiferow	Germany	46.587	Did not advance						
61	Sergej Pfeifer	Germany	46.549	Did not advance						
62	Deyan Yordanov	Bulgaria	44.274	Did not advance						
63	Florent Marée	France	44.087	Did not advance						
64	Vasil Vetsev	Bulgaria	43.362	Did not advance						
65	Sean Townsend	United States	38.337	Did not advance						
66	Akihiro Kasamatsu	Japan	38.311	Did not advance						
67	Valeriy Pereshkura	Ukraine	38.236	Did not advance						
68	Huang Xu	China	37.999	Did not advance						
69	Aleksandr Shostak	Belarus	37.973	Did not advance						
70	Xiao Junfeng	China	37.712	Did not advance						
71	Andreu Vivó	Spain	37.612	Did not advance						
72	Zoltán Supola	Hungary	37.586	Did not advance						
73	Vitaly Rudnitsky	Belarus	37.399	Did not advance						
74	Marius Tobă	Germany	37.337	Did not advance						
75	Aleksandr Kruzhilov	Belarus	37.224	Did not advance						
76	Khristian Ivanov	Bulgaria	37.211	Did not advance						
77	Rene Tschernitschek	Germany	36.998	Did not advance						
78	Leszek Blanik	Poland	36.325	Did not advance						
79	Mladen Stefanov	Bulgaria	36.286	Did not advance						
80	Raouf Abdelraouf	Egypt	35.212	Did not advance						
81	Sergey Fedorchenko	Kazakhstan	29.162	Did not advance						
82	Marius Urzică	Romania	29.049	Did not advance						
83	Lee Jang-hyeong	South Korea	28.849	Did not advance						
84	Éric Casimir	France	28.837	Did not advance						
85	Yeo Hong-cheol	South Korea	28.762	Did not advance						
86	Norimasa Iwai	Japan	28.699	Did not advance						
87	Ruslan Mezentsev	Ukraine	28.462	Did not advance						
88	John Roethlisberger	United States	28.412	Did not advance						
89	Kyle Shewfelt	Canada	19.150	Did not advance						
90	Gervasio Deferr	Spain	19.087	Did not advance						
91	Dimosthenis Tambakos	Greece	18.574	Did not advance						
92	Sasha Jeltkov	Canada	17.699	Did not advance						
93	Éric Poujade	France	9.787	Did not advance						
94	Szilveszter Csollány	Hungary	9.775	Did not advance						
95	Ioannis Melissanidis	Greece	9.737	Did not advance						
96	Dmitry Drevin	Russia	9.225	Did not advance						
97	Mitja Petkovšek	Slovenia	8.687	Did not advance						
