= Gymnastics at the 2000 Summer Olympics – Men's artistic qualification =

Olympic qualification event

These are the results of the men's qualification round, the preliminary round which decided the finalists for all eight events for men in artistic gymnastics at the 2000 Summer Olympics in Sydney. The qualification round took place on September 16 at the Sydney SuperDome.

The top twelve teams from the 1999 World Artistic Gymnastics Championships completed for places in the team final. Each team was allowed to bring up to six gymnasts. During qualification, each team could have up to five gymnasts compete on each apparatus, and could count the four highest scores for the team total. The six teams with the highest scores in the qualification round advanced to the team final.

Individual gymnasts competed for places in the all-around and apparatus finals. The twenty-four gymnasts with the highest scores in the all-around advanced to that final, except that each country could only send three gymnasts to the all-around final. The eight gymnasts with the highest scores on each apparatus advanced to those finals, except that each country could only send two gymnasts to each apparatus final.

In total, 97 gymnasts from 32 countries competed in the qualification round.

== Results ==
Team/Gymnast	Nation	Floor Exercise		Pommel Horse		Rings		Vault		Parallel Bars		Horizontal Bar		Total (All-around)	
Team/Gymnast	Nation	Score	Rank	Score	Rank	Score	Rank	Score	Rank	Score	Rank	Score	Rank	Score	Rank
Russia		38.187	2	38.374	6	38.312	2	38.649	1	37.662	9	38.949	1	230.133	1
Alexei Nemov	Russia	9.800	1	9.787	3	9.600	14	9.712	6	9.675	6	9.787	2	58.361	1
Alexei Bondarenko	Russia	9.475	18	9.712	13	9.600	16	9.750	3	9.525	28	9.750	5	57.812	3
Maxim Aleshin	Russia	9.287	34	9.100	62	9.575	19	9.575	25	8.950	65	9.787	3	56.274	24
Yevgeni Podgorny	Russia	9.625	6	9.125	61	9.462	43	9.387	37	9.512	29	9.162	64	56.273	25
Nikolai Kryukov	Russia	—	—	9.750	7	9.537	26	9.612	21	8.812	70	9.625	29	47.336	56
Dmitri Drevin	Russia	9.225	38	—	—	—	—	—	—	—	—	—	—	9.225	96
China		38.424	1	38.774	2	38.175	6	37.649	7	38.562	2	38.412	6	229.996	2
Yang Wei	China	9.612	7	9.687	17	9.650	7	9.675	13	9.225	53	9.600	35	57.449	5
Zheng Lihui	China	9.587	11	9.675	22	9.575	18	9.512	32	9.550	25	9.412	53	57.311	8
Li Xiaopeng	China	9.725	2	—	—	9.600	17	9.225	57	9.762	3	9.650	27	47.962	54
Xing Aowei	China	9.500	15	9.725	11	—	—	9.237	55	9.575	19	9.537	44	47.574	55
Huang Xu	China	—	—	9.687	18	9.012	66	—	—	9.675	7	9.625	30	37.999	68
Xiao Junfeng	China	9.475	17	9.675	20	9.350	51	9.212	60	—	—	—	—	37.712	70
Ukraine		37.636	5	38.824	1	38.187	5	38.336	4	37.899	6	38.774	3	229.656	3
Oleksandr Beresch	Ukraine	9.612	9	9.775	5	9.550	24	9.675	12	9.650	10	9.787	1	58.049	2
Oleksandr Svitlychniy	Ukraine	9.225	36	9.712	14	9.562	23	9.512	33	9.575	22	9.700	13	57.286	9
Roman Zozulya	Ukraine	8.687	62	9.637	28	9.650	8	9.562	29	8.800	71	9.587	36	55.923	32
Valeriy Honcharov	Ukraine	—	—	9.550	38	9.337	52	9.537	31	9.162	57	9.025	69	53.987	59
Valeriy Pereshkura	Ukraine	9.462	20	—	—	—	—	9.562	27	9.512	30	9.700	13	38.236	67
Ruslan Mezentsev	Ukraine	9.337	32	9.700	15	9.425	45	—	—	—	—	—	—	28.462	87
United States		37.662	4	38.024	10	38.211	4	38.500	2	38.175	5	38.636	5	229.208	4
Paul Hamm	United States	9.475	16	9.562	37	9.512	33	9.700	9	9.575	21	9.612	32	57.436	6
Blaine Wilson	United States	9.025	50	9.462	49	9.612	13	9.800	1	9.312	45	9.650	25	56.861	14
Stephen McCain	United States	9.225	39	8.850	69	9.462	39	8.987	72	9.500	31	9.662	23	55.686	36
Morgan Hamm	United States	9.612	7	9.400	52	9.425	47	9.350	39	9.475	34	—	—	47.262	57
Sean Townsend	United States	9.350	27	—	—	—	—	9.650	17	9.625	13	9.712	12	38.337	65
John Roethlisberger	United States	—	—	9.600	32	9.625	11	—	—	—	—	9.187	63	28.412	88
Japan		37.112	7	38.411	5	38.374	1	38.498	3	36.999	12	38.687	4	228.081	5
Naoya Tsukahara	Japan	9.162	43	9.637	30	9.625	12	9.612	22	9.200	54	9.750	6	56.986	10
Kenichi Fujita	Japan	9.425	24	9.587	34	9.487	38	9.662	15	8.812	69	9.587	37	56.560	18
Yoshihiro Saito	Japan	9.150	44	9.525	41	9.575	21	9.562	28	8.975	63	9.700	13	56.487	20
Mutsumi Harada	Japan	9.175	41	9.450	50	9.487	37	—	—	9.262	49	9.600	33	46.974	58
Akihiro Kasamatsu	Japan	9.350	26	9.662	24	—	—	9.662	14	—	—	9.637	28	38.311	66
Norimasa Iwai	Japan	—	—	—	—	9.687	5	9.450	35	9.562	23	—	—	28.699	86
Romania		37.324	6	38.586	3	37.874	9	38.211	6	38.274	4	37.411	11	227.680	6
Marian Drăgulescu	Romania	9.700	3	9.500	42	9.575	20	9.637	18	9.625	13	9.312	56	57.349	7
Ioan Silviu Suciu	Romania	9.437	23	9.712	12	9.425	46	9.350	44	9.612	16	9.237	60	56.773	15
Rareș Orzața	Romania	9.337	30	9.500	45	9.637	10	9.637	19	9.162	56	9.287	58	56.560	19
Florentin Pescaru	Romania	8.850	59	9.562	36	9.237	59	9.587	24	9.375	41	9.212	61	55.823	33
Marius Urzică	Romania	—	—	9.812	1	—	—	—	—	9.662	8	9.575	40	29.049	82
Dorin Petcu	Romania	—	—	—	—	—	—	—	—	—	—	—	—	—	—
South Korea		36.487	9	38.562	4	37.574	10	38.262	5	38.825	1	37.636	9	227.346	7
Cho Seong-min	South Korea	9.350	29	9.675	21	9.512	32	9.700	9	9.675	5	9.025	70	56.937	13
Jung Jin-soo	South Korea	8.850	58	9.500	46	9.512	31	9.650	16	9.775	2	9.287	57	56.574	17
Lee Joo-hyung	South Korea	8.712	61	9.650	26	9.050	65	9.012	70	9.800	1	9.762	4	55.986	31
Kim Dong-hwa	South Korea	8.112	73	9.300	55	8.187	75	9.225	56	9.250	50	9.050	68	53.124	48
Lee Jang-hyung	South Korea	—	—	9.737	8	—	—	—	—	9.575	20	9.537	45	28.849	83
Yeo Hong-chul	South Korea	9.575	13	—	—	9.500	34	9.687	11	—	—	—	—	28.762	85
Belarus		37.799	3	37.999	11	38.161	7	37.137	9	37.823	7	38.336	7	227.255	8
Ivan Ivankov	Belarus	8.925	56	9.625	31	9.675	6	9.350	42	9.662	9	9.712	11	56.949	11
Aleksey Sinkevich	Belarus	9.462	19	9.587	35	9.462	40	9.312	47	9.287	47	9.512	46	56.622	16
Ivan Pavlovsky	Belarus	9.350	28	9.325	54	9.337	53	9.350	42	9.462	35	9.550	43	56.374	22
Aleksandr Shostak	Belarus	—	—	9.462	48	9.537	28	—	—	9.412	39	9.562	41	37.973	69
Vitaly Rudnitsky	Belarus	9.525	14	—	—	9.487	36	9.125	64	9.262	48	—	—	37.399	73
Aleksandr Kruzhilov	Belarus	9.462	22	9.237	54	—	—	9.025	69	—	—	9.500	48	37.224	75
France		38.574	12	38.474	8	38.249	11	38.261	12	38.312	3	38.149	2	225.469	9
Dimitri Karbanenko	France	9.600	10	9.050	64	9.300	56	9.275	53	9.537	26	9.662	22	56.424	21
Yann Cucherat	France	8.512	66	9.550	38	9.537	28	9.312	48	9.712	4	9.700	13	56.323	23
Benjamin Varonian	France	9.287	35	9.100	63	9.525	30	8.987	71	9.525	27	9.737	8	56.161	27
Florent Marée	France	8.550	64	—	—	9.162	61	9.050	66	9.650	11	7.675	79	44.087	63
Eric Casimir	France	—	—	9.725	10	—	—	—	—	9.425	38	9.687	18	28.837	84
Eric Poujade	France	—	—	9.787	3	—	—	—	—	—	—	—	—	9.787	93
Germany		37.636	10	36.824	7	38.799	3	38.199	11	38.386	8	38.136	8	225.282	10
Dimitrij Nonin	Germany	8.900	57	9.500	43	9.550	25	8.975	73	9.437	37	9.687	18	56.049	29
Andreas Wecker	Germany	8.962	54	9.675	19	9.250	58	8.912	75	9.550	24	9.662	21	56.011	30
Jan-Peter Nikiferow	Germany	8.962	55	9.700	16	—	—	9.625	20	8.975	64	9.325	55	46.587	60
Sergej Pfeifer	Germany	9.137	45	9.200	59	9.600	15	—	—	9.600	17	9.012	71	46.549	61
Marius Tobă	Germany	—	—	9.375	53	9.700	4	9.187	62	9.075	60	—	—	37.337	74
Rene Tschernitschek	Germany	9.037	49	—	—	9.362	50	9.212	59	—	—	9.387	54	36.998	77
Spain		36.787	8	38.161	9	37.936	8	37.549	8	37.062	11	37.399	12	224.894	11
Víctor Cano	Spain	8.725	60	9.737	9	9.337	54	9.037	68	9.412	39	9.500	48	55.748	34
Omar Cortés	Spain	8.237	70	9.125	60	9.537	27	9.350	39	9.300	46	9.512	47	55.061	37
Alejandro Barrenechea	Spain	9.225	37	8.912	66	9.562	22	9.212	58	8.750	73	9.250	59	54.911	39
Saúl Cofiño	Spain	9.462	21	9.637	29	9.175	60	9.275	51	7.600	81	9.137	66	54.286	43
Andreu Vivó	Spain	—	—	9.662	23	9.550	35	—	—	9.600	18	8.850	72	37.612	71
Gervasio Deferr	Spain	9.375	25	—	—	—	—	9.712	6	—	—	—	—	19.087	90
Bulgaria		36.074	11	36.674	12	36.999	12	37.024	10	37.473	10	37.486	10	221.730	12
Yordan Yovchev	Bulgaria	9.650	5	9.587	33	9.775	2	9.350	41	9.612	15	9.625	30	57.599	4
Dimitar Lunchev	Bulgaria	9.012	51	8.725	71	9.075	64	9.337	45	9.312	44	9.487	50	54.948	38
Deyan Yordanov	Bulgaria	8.200	72	9.237	57	—	—	8.950	74	9.237	52	8.650	74	44.274	62
Vasil Vetsev	Bulgaria	8.325	68	8.875	67	8.325	73	—	—	9.150	58	8.687	73	43.362	64
Khristian Ivanov	Bulgaria	—	—	—	—	9.312	55	8.900	76	9.312	43	9.687	20	37.211	76
Mladen Stefanov	Bulgaria	9.087	48	8.975	65	8.837	69	9.387	38	—	—	—	—	36.286	79
Individuals															
Ilia Giorgadze	Georgia	9.337	31	9.525	40	9.450	44	9.262	54	9.637	12	9.737	7	56.948	12
Igors Vihrovs	Latvia	9.662	4	8.462	74	9.375	49	9.587	23	9.500	32	9.600	34	56.186	26
Erick López	Cuba	8.975	53	9.500	47	9.637	9	9.537	30	9.062	61	9.412	52	56.123	28
Lazaro Lamelas	Cuba	9.137	47	9.437	51	9.387	48	9.312	46	8.887	67	9.562	42	55.722	35
Alberto Busnari	Italy	9.162	42	9.650	27	8.362	72	8.637	78	9.175	55	9.700	17	54.686	40
Craig Heap	Great Britain	9.137	46	8.800	70	9.462	41	8.825	77	9.075	59	9.212	62	54.511	41
Dieter Rehm	Switzerland	8.025	75	8.587	72	8.862	67	9.725	5	9.487	33	9.737	9	54.423	42
Philippe Rizzo	Australia	9.312	33	9.225	58	8.837	68	9.037	67	9.237	51	8.475	76	54.123	44
Igor Cassina	Italy	8.387	67	9.500	44	8.537	71	9.300	49	8.737	74	9.650	25	54.111	45
Flemming Solberg	Norway	8.300	69	8.875	68	8.625	70	9.400	36	9.325	42	9.450	51	53.975	46
Damian Istria	Australia	9.012	52	8.175	77	9.462	42	9.275	52	8.937	66	9.112	67	53.973	47
Diego Lizardi	Puerto Rico	8.537	65	8.000	78	9.162	62	9.137	63	8.275	79	9.150	64	52.261	49
Rúnar Alexandersson	Iceland	8.225	71	7.975	79	8.312	74	8.600	79	9.462	36	9.575	39	52.149	50
Lin Yung-Hsi	Chinese Taipei	9.225	40	8.387	75	8.150	76	9.287	50	8.650	76	7.975	77	51.675	51
David Phillips	New Zealand	8.650	63	6.725	80	7.962	77	9.087	65	8.450	77	8.587	75	49.461	52
Pae Gil-su	North Korea	7.550	76	9.762	6	6.375	78	8.537	80	8.237	80	7.950	78	48.411	53
Zoltán Supola	Hungary	—	—	9.787	2	—	—	9.187	61	9.025	62	9.587	38	37.586	72
Leszek Blanik	Poland	—	—	8.575	73	9.275	57	9.700	8	8.775	72	—	—	36.325	78
Raouf Abdelraouf	Egypt	—	—	8.300	76	9.100	63	9.462	34	8.350	78	—	—	35.212	80
Sergey Fedorchenko	Kazakhstan	—	—	9.662	24	—	—	9.775	2	—	—	9.725	10	29.162	81
Kyle Shewfelt	Canada	9.575	12	—	—	—	—	9.575	26	—	—	—	—	19.150	89
Dimosthenis Tampakos	Greece	—	—	—	—	9.762	3	—	—	8.812	68	—	—	18.574	91
Alexander Jeltkov	Canada	8.037	74	—	—	—	—	—	—	—	—	9.662	24	17.699	92
Szilveszter Csollány	Hungary	—	—	—	—	9.775	1	—	—	—	—	—	—	9.775	94
Ioannis Melissanidis	Greece	—	—	—	—	—	—	9.737	4	—	—	—	—	9.737	95
Mitja Petkovšek	Slovenia	—	—	—	—	—	—	—	—	8.687	75	—	—	8.687	97

== Finalists ==
=== Team all-around ===
Rank	Team	Total
1	Russia	230.133
2	China	229.996
3	Ukraine	229.656
4	United States	229.208
5	Japan	228.081
6	Romania	227.680

=== Individual all-around ===
Rank	Gymnast	Total
1	Alexei Nemov (RUS)	58.361
2	Oleksandr Beresh (UKR)	58.049
3	Alexei Bondarenko (RUS)	57.812
4	Yordan Yovchev (BUL)	57.599
5	Yang Wei (CHN)	57.449
6	Paul Hamm (USA)	57.436
7	Marian Drăgulescu (ROU)	57.349
8	Zheng Lihui (CHN)	57.311
9	Oleksandr Svetlichny (UKR)	57.286
10	Naoya Tsukahara (JPN)	56.986
11	Ivan Ivankov (BLR)	56.949
12	Ilia Giorgadze (GEO)	56.948
13	Cho Seong-Min (KOR)	56.937
14	Blaine Wilson (USA)	56.861
15	Ioan Suciu (ROU)	56.773
16	Aleksei Sinkevich (BLR)	56.622
17	Jung Jin-Soo (KOR)	56.574
18	Kenichi Fujita (JPN)	56.560
19	Rareș Orzața (ROU)	56.560
20	Yoshihiro Saito (JPN)	56.487
21	Dimitri Karbanenko (FRA)	56.424
22	Ivan Pavlovski (BLR)	56.374
23	Yann Cucherat (FRA)	56.323
24	Maxim Alechine (RUS)	56.274
26	Igor Vihrovs (LAT)	56.186
27	Benjamin Varonian (FRA)	56.161
28	Erick López (CUB)	56.123
29	Dimitrij Nonin (GER)	56.049
30	Andreas Wecker (GER)	56.011
31	Lee Joo-Hyung (KOR)	55.986
32	Roman Zozulya (UKR)	55.923
34	Víctor Cano (ESP)	55.748
35	Lazaro Lamelas (CUB)	55.722
36	Stephen McCain (USA)	55.686
37	Omar Cortes (ESP)	55.061
38	Dimitar Lountchev (BUL)	54.948

=== Floor ===
Rank	Gymnast	Score
1	Alexei Nemov (RUS)	9.800
2	Li Xiaopeng (CHN)	9.725
3	Marian Drăgulescu (ROU)	9.700
4	Igors Vihrovs (LAT)	9.662
5	Yordan Yovchev (BUL)	9.650
6	Yevgeni Podgorny (RUS)	9.625
7	Yang Wei (CHN)	9.612
7	Morgan Hamm (USA)	9.612

=== Pommel horse ===
Rank	Gymnast	Score
1	Marius Urzică (ROU)	9.812
2	Zoltán Supola (HUN)	9.787
3	Alexei Nemov (RUS)	9.787
3	Eric Poujade (FRA)	9.787
5	Oleksandr Beresh (UKR)	9.775
6	Pae Kil-Su (PRK)	9.762
7	Nikolai Kryukov (RUS)	9.750
8	Lee Jang-Hyung (KOR)	9.737

=== Rings ===
Rank	Gymnast	Score
1	Szilveszter Csollány (HUN)	9.775
2	Yordan Yovchev (BUL)	9.775
3	Dismosthenis Tampakos (GRE)	9.762
4	Marius Tobă (GER)	9.700
5	Norimasa Iwai (JPN)	9.687
6	Ivan Ivankov (BLR)	9.675
7	Yang Wei (CHN)	9.650
8	Roman Zozulya (UKR)	9.650

=== Vault ===
Rank	Gymnast	Score
1	Blaine Wilson (USA)	9.800
2	Sergei Fedorchenko (KAZ)	9.775
3	Alexei Bondarenko (RUS)	9.750
4	Ioannis Melissaanidis (GRE)	9.737
5	Dieter Rehm (SUI)	9.725
6	Gervasio Deferr (ESP)	9.712
6	Alexei Nemov (RUS)	9.712
8	Leszek Blanik (POL)	9.700

=== Parallel bars ===
Rank	Gymnast	Score
1	Lee Joo-Hyung (KOR)	9.800
2	Jung Jin-Soo (KOR)	9.775
3	Li Xiaopeng (CHN)	9.762
4	Yann Cucherat (FRA)	9.712
6	Alexei Nemov (RUS)	9.675
7	Huang Xu (CHN)	9.675
8	Marius Urzică (ROU)	9.662
9	Ivan Ivankov (BLR)	9.662

=== Horizontal bar ===
Rank	Gymnast	Score
1	Oleksandr Beresh (UKR)	9.787
2	Alexei Nemov (RUS)	9.787
3	Maxim Alechine (RUS)	9.787
4	Lee Joo-Hyung (KOR)	9.762
6	Naoya Tsukahara (JPN)	9.750
7	Ilia Giorgadze (GEO)	9.737
8	Benjamin Varonian (FRA)	9.737
9	Dieter Rehm (SUI)	9.737
