= Gymnastics at the 2000 Summer Olympics – Men's artistic team all-around =

Men's artistic team all-around at the Games of the XXVII Olympiad
- Venue: Sydney SuperDome
- Date: 16 September 2000 (qualifying); 18 September 2000 (final)
- Competitors: 71 from 12 nations
- Winning time: 231.919

Medalists
1st place, gold medalist(s)		Huang Xu, Li Xiaopeng, Xiao Junfeng, Xing Aowei, Yang Wei, and Zheng Lihui	China
2nd place, silver medalist(s)		Oleksandr Beresh, Valeri Goncharov, Ruslan Myezyentsev, Valeri Pereshkura, Olexander Svitlichni, and Roman Zozulya	Ukraine
3rd place, bronze medalist(s)		Maxim Aleshin, Alexei Bondarenko, Dmitri Drevin, Nikolai Kryukov, Alexei Nemov, and Yevgeni Podgorny	Russia

These are the results of the men's team all-around competition, one of eight events for male competitors in artistic gymnastics at the 2000 Summer Olympics in Sydney. The qualification and final rounds took place on 16–18 September 2000 at the Sydney SuperDome.

== Results ==
=== Qualification ===
Twelve national teams composed by six gymnasts competed in the team all-around event in the artistic gymnastics qualification round on September 16. The six highest scoring teams advanced to the final on September 18.

=== Final ===
Rank	Team	Floor Exercise	Pommel Horse	Still Rings	Vault	Parallel Bars	Horizontal Bar	Total
Gold medal	China	38.524 (1)	38.874 (1)	38.487 (1)	38.574 (4)	38.849 (2)	38.611 (3)	231.919
Gold medal	Yang Wei	9.575	9.687	9.687	9.700	9.637	9.762	58.048
Gold medal	Zheng Lihui	9.675	9.725	9.600	9.600	9.337	9.437	57.374
Gold medal	Li Xiaopeng	9.687		9.550	9.712	9.775	9.675	48.399
Gold medal	Xing Aowei	9.587	9.750		9.487	9.700	9.737	48.261
Gold medal	Huang Xu		9.712	9.650		9.737	9.275	38.374
Gold medal	Xiao Junfeng		8.387	6.825	9.562			24.774
Silver medal	Ukraine	37.750 (4)	38.811 (2)	38.249 (4)	38.461 (5)	38.261 (4)	38.774 (2)	230.306
Silver medal	Alexander Beresch	9.175	9.762	9.537	9.687	9.662	9.787	57.610
Silver medal	Olexander Svitlichni	9.112	9.737	9.350	9.687	9.662	9.675	57.223
Silver medal	Roman Zozulya	9.425	9.575	9.650	9.325	9.500	9.625	57.223
Silver medal	Valeri Goncharov		9.587	9.512	9.550	8.575	9.587	46.811
Silver medal	Valery Pereshkura	9.700			9.537	9.437	9.687	38.361
Silver medal	Ruslan Myezyentsev	9.450	9.725	9.550				28.725
Bronze medal	Russia	38.037 (2)	37.974 (6)	38.487 (2)	38.736 (1)	38.411 (3)	38.374 (4)	230.019
Bronze medal	Alexei Nemov	9.800	9.787	9.637	9.737	9.775	9.687	58.423
Bronze medal	Maxim Aleshin	9.237	9.050	9.600	9.600	9.462	9.575	56.474
Bronze medal	Alexei Bondarenko	9.250	9.150	9.675	9.687	9.537	8.700	55.999
Bronze medal	Nikolai Kryukov		9.737	9.562	9.712	9.637	9.650	48.298
Bronze medal	Yevgeni Podgorny	9.637	9.300		9.450	9.462	9.512	47.361
Bronze medal	Dmitri Drevin	9.350		9.575				18.925
4	Japan	37.849 (3)	38.324 (3)	38.425 (3)	38.724 (2)	37.711 (6)	38.824 (1)	229.857
4	Naoya Tsukahara	9.500	9.637	9.650	9.662	9.537	9.712	57.698
4	Yoshihiro Saito	9.312	9.550	9.575	9.437	9.512	9.762	57.148
4	Kenichi Fujita	9.325	9.525	9.525	9.712	9.212	9.700	56.999
4	Mutsumi Harada	9.212	8.350	9.350		9.450	9.650	46.012
4	Akihiro Kasamatsu	9.712	9.612		9.650		9.637	38.611
4	Norimasa Iwai			9.675	9.700	8.787		28.162
5	United States	37.600 (5)	38.099 (5)	38.111 (5)	37.937 (6)	39.024 (1)	38.212 (5)	228.983
5	Blaine Wilson	9.450	9.587	9.587	9.700	9.775	9.050	57.149
5	Paul Hamm	9.600	9.600	9.525	9.725	9.762	8.462	56.674
5	Stephen McCain	9.125	9.325	9.462	9.050	9.700	9.725	56.387
5	John Roethlisberger		9.587	9.537		9.425	9.737	38.286
5	Sean Townsend	9.425			9.200	9.787	9.700	38.112
5	Morgan Hamm	8.787	9.125	9.425	9.312			36.649
6	Romania	37.386 (6)	38.299 (4)	37.836 (6)	38.661 (3)	37.999 (5)	37.362 (6)	227.543
6	Marian Drăgulescu	9.387	9.387	9.537	9.737	9.587	9.550	57.185
6	Ioan Silviu Suciu	9.212	9.637	9.362	9.600	9.650	9.375	56.836
6	Rareș Orzața	9.237	9.425	9.575	9.637	8.962	9.650	56.486
6	Florentin Pescaru	9.550	9.450	9.362	9.687	9.050	8.687	55.786
6	Marius Urzică		9.787			9.712	8.787	28.286
6	Dorin Petcu							0.000
