= 1998 European Men's Artistic Gymnastics Championships =

23rd European Men's Artistic Gymnastics Championships
- Location: Saint Petersburg, Russia
- Start date: 30 April 1998
- End date: 3 May 1998

The 23rd European Men's Artistic Gymnastics Championships were held in Saint Petersburg, Russia from 30 April to 3 May 1998. This event was for male gymnasts in both senior and junior levels.

== Medalists ==
Event	Gold	Silver	Bronze
Senior
Team	France (FRA); Thiérry Aymes; Éric Casimir; Samuel Dumont; Dimitri Karbanenko; Éric Poujade	Russia (RUS); Alexei Nemov; Alexei Bondarenko; Dmitri Lvov; Maxim Aleshin; Nikolai Kryukov	Germany (GER); Valeri Belenki; Sergey Kharkov; Jan-Peter Nikiferow; Daniel Farago; Dimitrij Nonin
All-around	Alexei Bondarenko (RUS)	Dmitri Karbanenko (FRA)	Alexei Nemov (RUS)
Floor	Alexei Nemov (RUS)	Ioannis Melissanidis (GRE)	Alexei Bondarenko (RUS)
Pommel horse	Eric Poujade (FRA)	Alexei Bondarenko (RUS)	Nikolai Kryukov (RUS)
Rings	Szilveszter Csollány (HUN)	Valeri Belenki (GER)	Dimosthenis Tampakos (GRE)
Vault	Ioannis Melissanidis (GRE)	Leszek Blanik (POL)	Dieter Rehm (SUI)
Parallel bars	Alexei Bondarenko (RUS)	Mitja Petkovšek (SLO)	Andreu Vivó (ESP)
Horizontal bar	Jesus Carballo (ESP)	Jari Monkkonen (FIN)	Dmitri Nonin (GER)
Junior
Team	France (FRA)	Russia (RUS)	Romania (ROU)
All-around	Florent Marée (FRA)	Georgi Grebenkov (RUS)	Andriy Mykhailychenko (UKR)

== Senior results ==
Full results of men's senior competition.

=== Team ===
Rank	Team	Floor (gymnastics)	Pommel horse	Rings (gymnastics)	Vault (gymnastics)	Parallel bars	Horizontal bar	Total
1st place, gold medalist(s)	France	26.750	28.725	26.537	27.762	27.200	27.849	164.823
2nd place, silver medalist(s)	Russia	27.199	27.875	28.237	28.024	27.175	26.299	164.809
3rd place, bronze medalist(s)	Germany	26.324	27.062	28.362	26.962	27.449	27.874	164.033
4	Bulgaria	28.425	26.087	27.950	26.962	27.062	26.674	163.160
5	Ukraine	27.062	27.486	26.775	28.049	26.162	27.599	163.133
6	Spain	25.762	26.737	27.987	26.649	27.150	28.374	162.659
7	Hungary	26.912	26.224	27.524	27.612	26.725	27.536	162.533
8	Romania	26.787	27.687	25.075	28.699	27.037	26.312	161.597

=== All-around ===
Rank	Athlete	Nation	Apparatus						Total
Rank	Athlete	Nation	F	PH	R	V	PB	HB	Total
1st place, gold medalist(s)	Alexei Bondarenko	Russia (RUS)	9.512	9.562	9.512	9.587	9.550	9.175	56.898
2nd place, silver medalist(s)	Dmitri Karbanenko	France (FRA)	9.475	9.462	9.050	9.625	9.425	9.475	56.512
3rd place, bronze medalist(s)	Alexei Nemov	Russia (RUS)	9.725	9.612	9.387	9.662	9.350	8.737	56.473
4	Roman Zozulya	Ukraine (UKR)	9.150	9.412	9.500	9.000	9.162	9.000	55.224
5	Oleksandr Beresch	Ukraine (UKR)	8.962	9.612	9.187	9.050	9.025	9.050	54.886
6	Jesús Carballo	Spain (ESP)	8.750	8.650	9.225	8.837	9.437	9.687	54.586
7	Flemming Solberg	Norway (NOR)	8.787	9.350	8.275	9.475	9.075	8.937	53.899
8	Dorin Petcu	Romania (ROM)	8.725	9.475	8.250	9.100	9.100	8.925	53.575
9	Jani Tanskanen	Finland (FIN)	9.037	9.100	8.887	8.787	7.850	9.487	53.148
10	Yordan Yovchev	Bulgaria (BUL)	8.450	9.050	9.537	8.987	8.837	8.100	52.961
11	Alexander Shostak	Belarus (BLR)	8.362	9.012	9.162	8.950	8.975	8.287	52.748
12	Cristian Ivanov	Bulgaria (BUL)	8.937	8.737	9.237	8.850	7.450	9.412	52.623
13	Leszek Blanik	Poland (POL)	8.462	8.387	9.187	9.450	8.687	8.400	52.573
14	Giovanni d'Innocenzo	Italy (ITA)	8.687	8.950	8.587	8.825	8.687	8.662	52.398
15	Jari Monkkonen	Finland (FIN)	8.500	9.025	8.000	8.887	8.400	9.562	52.374
16	Dieter Rehm	Switzerland (SUI)	8.150	8.512	7.975	9.450	8.912	9.350	52.349
16	Omar Cortés	Spain (ESP)	8.037	9.175	9.000	8.787	8.150	9.200	52.349
18	Dejan Locnikar	Slovenia (SLO)	7.900	9.050	7.925	8.837	9.187	8.950	51.849
19	Andrew Atherton	Great Britain (GBR)	8.212	8.750	8.912	9.075	8.112	8.537	51.598
20	Tor Einar Refsnes	Norway (NOR)	8.662	7.800	8.000	9.200	8.350	8.100	50.112
21	Jevgēņijs Saproņenko	Latvia (LAT)	8.687	8.200	8.362	8.987	8.375	7.150	52.261
22	Sergei Kharkov	Germany (GER)	8.450	-	-	-	-	-	8.450
23	Georgios Ellissiadis	Greece (GRE)	7.150	-	-	-	-	-	7.150

=== Floor ===
Rank	Gymnast	Total
1st place, gold medalist(s)	Alexei Nemov (RUS)	9.625
2nd place, silver medalist(s)	Ioannis Melissanidis (GRE)	9.575
3rd place, bronze medalist(s)	Alexei Bondarenko (RUS)	9.500
4	Ivan Ivanov (BUL)	9.462
5	Yordan Yovchev (BUL)	9.450
6	Vitaly Rudnitsky (BLR)	9.125
7	Thiérry Aymes (FRA)	9.025
8	Kasper Fardan (DEN)	8.550

=== Pommel horse ===
Rank	Gymnast	Total
1st place, gold medalist(s)	Éric Poujade (FRA)	9.687
2nd place, silver medalist(s)	Alexei Bondarenko (RUS)	9.650
3rd place, bronze medalist(s)	Nikolai Kryukov (RUS)	9.625
4	Eric Casimir (FRA)	9.587
5	Zoltán Supola (HUN)	9.550
6	Valeri Belenki (GER)	9.537
7	Ioan Silviu Suciu (ROM)	9.512
8	Dorin Petcu (ROM)	9.050

=== Rings ===
Rank	Gymnast	Total
1st place, gold medalist(s)	Szilveszter Csollány (HUN)	9.675
2nd place, silver medalist(s)	Valeri Belenki (GER)	9.600
3rd place, bronze medalist(s)	Dimosthenis Tampakos (GRE)	9.587
4	Alexei Bondarenko (RUS)	9.525
5	Yordan Yovchev (BUL)	9.487
6	Riku Koivunen (FIN)	9.462
7	Dmitri Nonin (GER)	9.100
8	Nikolai Kryukov (RUS)	8.687

=== Vault ===
Rank	Gymnast	Total
1st place, gold medalist(s)	Ioannis Melissanidis (GRE)	9.556
2nd place, silver medalist(s)	Leszek Blanik (POL)	9.549
3rd place, bronze medalist(s)	Dieter Rehm (SUI)	9.475
4	Dmitri Karbanenko (FRA)	9.424
4	Vasile Cioana (ROM)	9.424
6	Alexei Nemov (RUS)	9.299
7	Ioan Silviu Suciu (ROM)	9.125
8	Czesław Słodkowski (POL)	8.999

=== Parallel bars ===
Rank	Gymnast	Total
1st place, gold medalist(s)	Alexei Bondarenko (RUS)	9.525
2nd place, silver medalist(s)	Mitja Petkovšek (SLO)	9.373
3rd place, bronze medalist(s)	Andreu Vivó (ESP)	9.300
4	Alexander Svetlitchni (UKR)	9.187
5	Dmitri Karbonenko (FRA)	9.162
6	Valeri Belenki (GER)	8.775
7	Florin Popa (ROM)	8.662
8	Ilia Giorgadze (GEO)	6.500

=== Horizontal bar ===
Rank	Gymnast	Total
1st place, gold medalist(s)	Jesús Carballo (ESP)	9.650
2nd place, silver medalist(s)	Jari Monkkonen (FIN)	9.537
3rd place, bronze medalist(s)	Dmitri Nonin (GER)	9.462
4	Cristian Ivanov (BUL)	9.350
5	Zoltán Supola (HUN)	9.287
6	Kasper Fardan (DEN)	9.025
7	Jani Tanskanen (FIN)	8.850
8	Aljaž Pegan (SLO)	8.762

== Junior results ==
Full results of men's junior competition.
