= Gymnastics at the 2000 Summer Olympics – Men's rings =

Olympic gymnastics event

Men's rings at the Games of the XXVII Olympiad
- Artistic gymnastics pictogram
- Venue: Sydney Super Dome
- Dates: 16 September 2000 (qualifying); 24 September 2000 (final)
- Competitors: 78 from 29 nations
- Winning score: 9.850

Medalists
1st place, gold medalist(s)		Szilveszter Csollány; Hungary
2nd place, silver medalist(s)		Dimosthenis Tampakos; Greece
3rd place, bronze medalist(s)		Yordan Yovchev; Bulgaria

The men's rings competition was one of eight events for male competitors in artistic gymnastics at the 2000 Summer Olympics in Sydney. The qualification and final rounds took place on September 16 and 24 at the Sydney Super Dome. There were 78 competitors from 29 nations; nations competing in the team event could have up to 5 gymnasts in the vault, while other nations could have up to 2 gymnasts. The event was won by Szilveszter Csollány of Hungary, the nation's first victory in the rings. Csollány, who had taken silver in 1996, became the eighth man to win multiple medals in the event. The silver this time went to Dimosthenis Tampakos of Greece—the first medal in the event for a Greek gymnast since 1896. Yordan Yovchev earned Bulgaria's first rings medal since 1960 with his bronze.

== Background ==
This was the 20th appearance of the event, which is one of the five apparatus events held every time there were apparatus events at the Summer Olympics (no apparatus events were held in 1900, 1908, 1912, or 1920). Five of the eight finalists from 1996 returned: silver medalist Szilveszter Csollány of Hungary, fourth-place finisher Yordan Yovchev of Bulgaria, fifth-place finisher Andreas Wecker of Germany, and seventh-place finishers Marius Toba of Germany and Blaine Wilson of the United States. The "Lord of the Rings," defending Olympic champion and five-time world champion, Jury Chechi of Italy was injured and unable to compete; reigning world champion Dong Zhen of China was also not competing. In their absence, Csollány (silver at both 1997 and 1999 world championships as well as at Athens 1996) was the favorite to finally win a global championship.

Latvia made its debut in the men's rings. The United States made its 18th appearance, most of any nation; the Americans had missed only the inaugural 1896 rings and the boycotted 1980 Games.

== Competition format ==
The 1996 gymnastics competition had introduced the "7–6–5" format, in which each team had 7 members, designated 6 for each apparatus, and had 5 count for team scores. In 2000, this was reduced across the board to a "6–5–4" format. Further, while in 1996 all 7 team members could compete on each apparatus for individual purposes, in 2000 only the 5 designated for that apparatus competed. The 2000 competition also eliminated the compulsory exercises; only voluntary exercises were done on each apparatus. The qualifying round scores were used for qualification for the team all-around, individual all-around, and apparatus finals.

The top eight gymnasts, with a limit of two per nation, advanced to the final. Non-finalists were ranked 9th through 78th based on preliminary score. The preliminary score had no effect on the final; once the eight finalists were selected, their ranking depended only on the final exercise.

== Schedule ==
All times are Australian Eastern Standard Time (UTC+10)

Date	Time	Round
Saturday, 16 September 2000		Qualifying
Sunday, 24 September 2000	18:15	Final

== Results ==
=== Qualifying ===
Seventy-eight gymnasts competed in the rings event during the qualification round on September 16. The eight highest scoring gymnasts advanced to the final on September 24. Each country was limited to two competitors in the final.

=== Final ===
Rank	Gymnast	Nation	Score
1st place, gold medalist(s)	Szilveszter Csollány	Hungary	9.850
2nd place, silver medalist(s)	Dimosthenis Tampakos	Greece	9.762
3rd place, bronze medalist(s)	Yordan Yovchev	Bulgaria	9.737
4	Yang Wei	China	9.712
5	Ivan Ivankov	Belarus	9.700
6	Marius Toba	Germany	9.675
7	Norimasa Iwai	Japan	9.662
8	Roman Zozulya	Ukraine	9.637
