= Gymnastics at the 2000 Summer Olympics – Men's horizontal bar =

Men's horizontal bar at the Games of the XXVII Olympiad
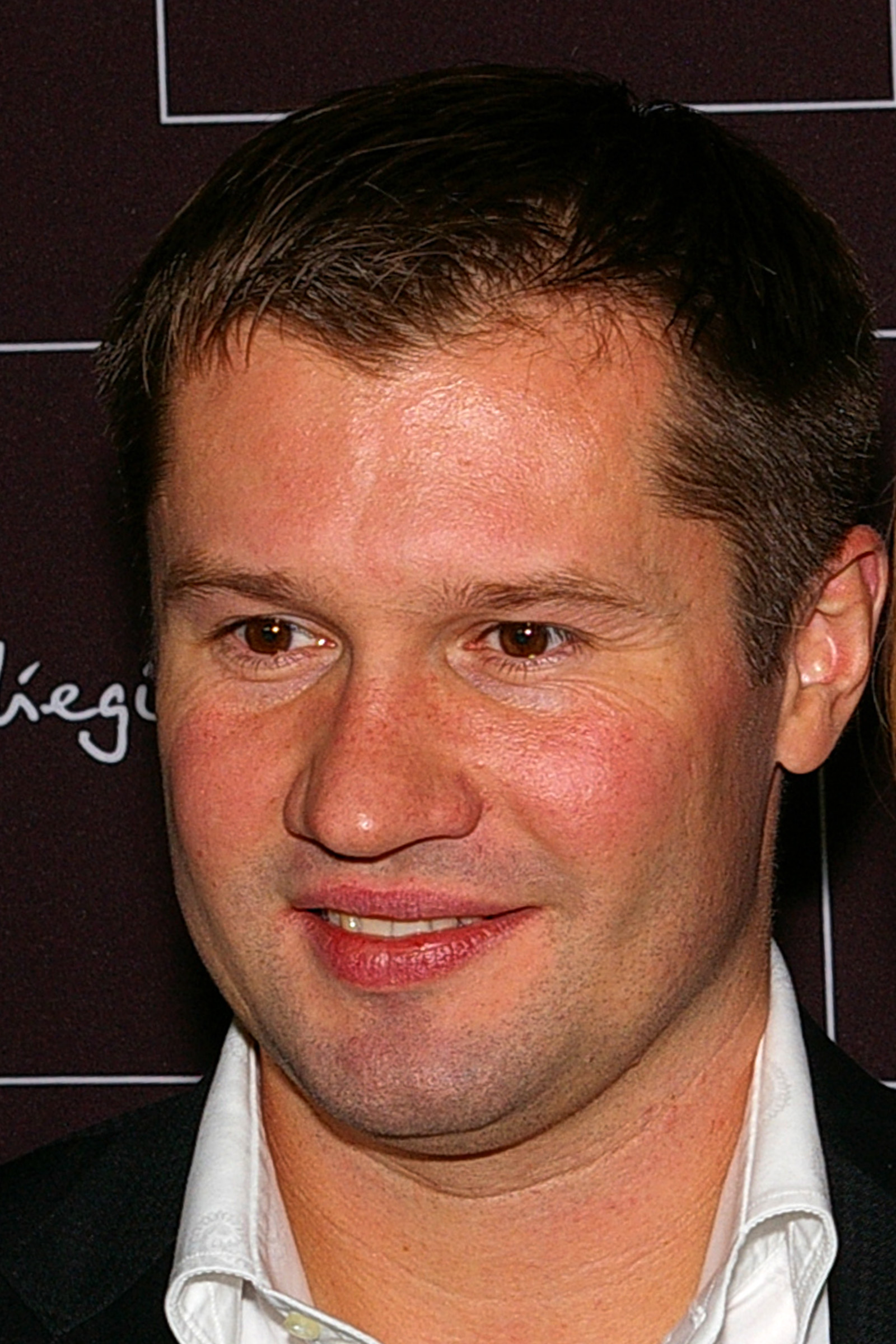
- Alexei Nemov (2009)
- Venue: Sydney Super Dome
- Dates: 16 September 2000 (qualifying); 25 September 2000 (final)
- Competitors: 79 from 28 nations
- Winning score: 9.787

Medalists
1st place, gold medalist(s)		Alexei Nemov; Russia
2nd place, silver medalist(s)		Benjamin Varonian; France
3rd place, bronze medalist(s)		Lee Joo-Hyung; South Korea

The men's horizontal bar competition was one of eight events for male competitors in artistic gymnastics at the 2000 Summer Olympics in Sydney. The qualification and final rounds took place on September 16 and 25 at the Sydney Super Dome. There were 79 competitors from 28 nations; nations competing in the team event could have up to 5 gymnasts in the vault, while other nations could have up to 2 gymnasts. The event was won by Alexei Nemov of Russia, the nation's first post-Soviet victory in the horizontal bar. Nemov, a bronze medalist in 1996, was the 10th man to win multiple medals in the horizontal bar. Benjamin Varonian earned France's first medal in the event since 1976 with his silver. Lee Joo-Hyung won South Korea's first medal in the event with his bronze.

== Background ==
This was the 20th appearance of the event, which is one of the five apparatus events held every time there were apparatus events at the Summer Olympics (no apparatus events were held in 1900, 1908, 1912, or 1920). Three of the eight finalists from 1996 returned: gold medalist (and 1992 silver medalist) Andreas Wecker of Germany, bronze medalist Alexei Nemov of Russia, and seventh-place finisher Lee Joo-Hyung of South Korea. Neither of the recent world champions (Jani Tanskanen of Finland in 1997, Jesús Carballo of Spain in 1999) competed in Sydney.

Latvia made its debut in the men's horizontal bar. The United States made its 18th appearance, most of any nation; the Americans had missed only the inaugural 1896 event and the boycotted 1980 Games.

== Competition format ==
The 1996 gymnastics competition had introduced the "7–6–5" format, in which each team had 7 members, designated 6 for each apparatus, and had 5 count for team scores. In 2000, this was reduced across the board to a "6–5–4" format. Further, while in 1996 all 7 team members could compete on each apparatus for individual purposes, in 2000 only the 5 designated for that apparatus competed. The 2000 competition also eliminated the compulsory exercises; only voluntary exercises were done on each apparatus. The qualifying round scores were used for qualification for the team all-around, individual all-around, and apparatus finals.

The top eight gymnasts, with a limit of two per nation, advanced to the final. Non-finalists were ranked 9th through 79th based on preliminary score. The preliminary score had no effect on the final; once the eight finalists were selected, their ranking depended only on the final exercise.

== Schedule ==
All times are Australian Eastern Standard Time (UTC+10)

Date	Time	Round
Saturday, 16 September 2000		Qualifying
Monday, 25 September 2000	18:12	Final

== Results ==
=== Qualifying ===
Seventy-nine gymnasts competed in the horizontal bar event during the qualification round on September 16. The eight highest scoring gymnasts advanced to the final on September 25. Each country was limited to two competitors in the final.

=== Final ===
The tie for gold was broken by execution score.

Rank	Gymnast	Nation	Score
1st place, gold medalist(s)	Alexei Nemov	Russia	9.787
2nd place, silver medalist(s)	Benjamin Varonian	France	9.787
3rd place, bronze medalist(s)	Lee Joo-Hyung	South Korea	9.775
4	Alexei Bondarenko	Russia	9.762
5	Oleksandr Beresch	Ukraine	9.750
6	Ilia Giorgadze	Georgia	9.625
7	Dieter Rehm	Switzerland	8.925
8	Naoya Tsukahara	Japan	8.825
