= Gymnastics at the 2000 Summer Olympics – Men's vault =

Olympic gymnastics event

Men's vault at the Games of the XXVII Olympiad
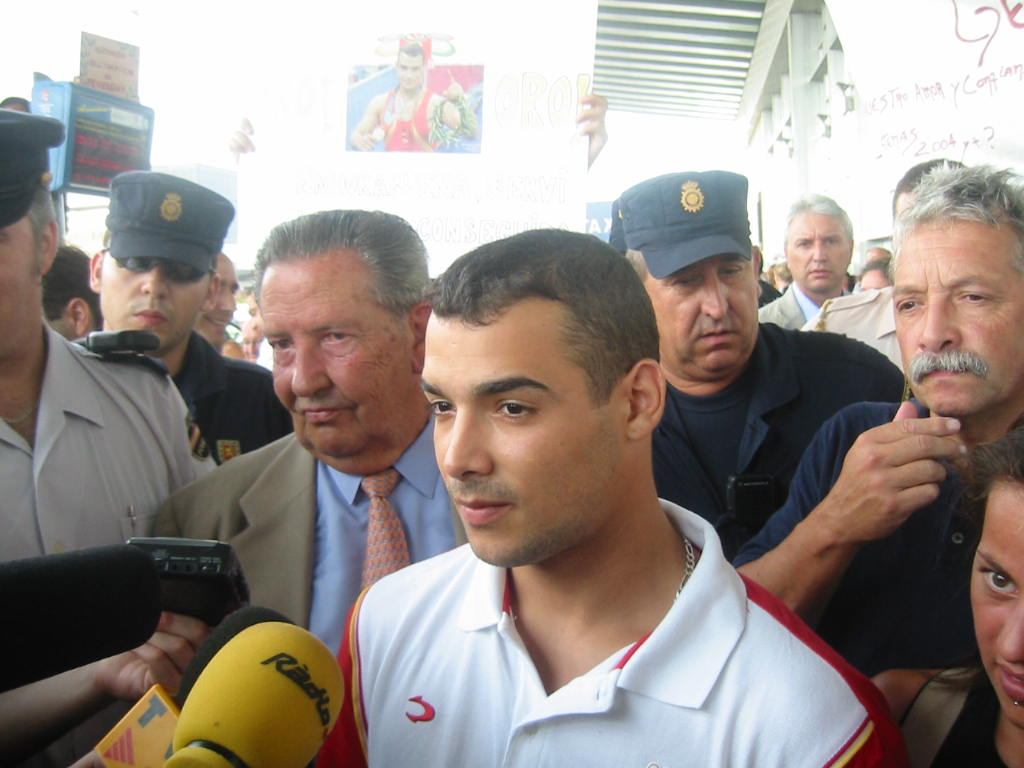
- Gervasio Deferr (2004)
- Venue: Sydney SuperDome
- Dates: 16–25 September 2000
- Competitors: 80 from 31 nations
- Winning score: 9.712

Medalists
1st place, gold medalist(s)		Gervasio Deferr	Spain
2nd place, silver medalist(s)		Alexei Bondarenko	Russia
3rd place, bronze medalist(s)		Leszek Blanik	Poland

The men's vault competition was one of eight events for male competitors in artistic gymnastics at the 2000 Summer Olympics in Sydney. The qualification and final rounds took place on September 16 and 25 at the Sydney SuperDome. There were 80 competitors from 31 nations; nations competing in the team event could have up to 5 gymnasts in the vault, while other nations could have up to 2 gymnasts. The event was won by Gervasio Deferr of Spain, the nation's first medal in the men's vault. Poland also earned its first medal in the event, with Leszek Blanik's bronze. Silver went to Alexei Bondarenko of Russia.

== Background ==
This was the 20th appearance of the event, which is one of the five apparatus events held every time there were apparatus events at the Summer Olympics (no apparatus events were held in 1900, 1908, 1912, or 1920). Three of the eight finalists from 1996 returned: gold medalist Alexei Nemov of Russia, silver medalist Yeo Hong-Chul of South Korea, and eighth-place finisher Ivan Pavlovski of Belarus. Li Xiaopeng of China was the reigning (1999) world champion; Sergey Fedorchenko had been world champion in 1997.

Latvia made its debut in the men's vault. The United States made its 18th appearance, most of any nation; the Americans had missed only the inaugural 1896 vault and the boycotted 1980 Games.

== Competition format ==
The event used a "vaulting horse" aligned parallel to the gymnast's run (rather than the modern "vaulting table" in use since 2004). The 1996 gymnastics competition had introduced the "7–6–5" format, in which each team had 7 members, designated 6 for each apparatus, and had 5 count for team scores. In 2000, this was reduced across the board to a "6–5–4" format. Further, while in 1996 all 7 team members could compete on each apparatus for individual purposes, in 2000 only the 5 designated for that apparatus competed. The 2000 competition also eliminated the compulsory exercises; only voluntary exercises were done on each apparatus. The qualifying round scores were used for qualification for the team all-around, individual all-around, and apparatus finals.

The top eight gymnasts, with a limit of two per nation, advanced to the final. Non-finalists were ranked 9th through 80th based on preliminary score. The preliminary score had no effect on the final; once the eight finalists were selected, their ranking depended only on the final exercise. For the vault, the final consisted of two attempts per gymnast, with the average score of the two counting.

== Schedule ==
All times are Australian Eastern Standard Time (UTC+10)

Date	Time	Round
Saturday, 16 September 2000		Qualifying
Monday, 25 September 2000	15:38	Final

== Results ==
=== Qualifying ===
Eighty gymnasts competed in the vault event during the qualification round on September 16. The eight highest scoring gymnasts advanced to the final on September 25. Each country was limited to two competitors in the final.

=== Final ===
Rank	Gymnast	Nation	Vault 1	Vault 2	Average
1st place, gold medalist(s)	Gervasio Deferr	Spain	9.800	9.625	9.712
2nd place, silver medalist(s)	Alexei Bondarenko	Russia	9.600	9.575	9.587
3rd place, bronze medalist(s)	Leszek Blanik	Poland	9.225	9.725	9.475
4	Alexei Nemov	Russia	9.262	9.650	9.456
5	Sergey Fedorchenko	Kazakhstan	9.212	9.587	9.399
6	Blaine Wilson	United States	9.425	9.300	9.362
7	Ioannis Melissanidis	Greece	9.212	9.312	9.262
8	Dieter Rehm	Switzerland	9.212	8.800	9.006
