= List of men's artistic gymnasts =

Men's Artistic Gymnasts are men who participate in the sport of gymnastics, specifically artistic gymnastics. Men first competed in Gymnastics at the Summer Olympics in 1896. This list is of those who are considered to be notable in men's artistic gymnastics. See gymnasium (ancient Greece) for the origin of the word gymnast from gymnastikos.

== A ==
Armenia
Gymnast	Dates	FIG listing
Albert Azaryan (Note: Albert Azaryan has represented Armenia and the USSR)	11 February 1929	Albert Azaryan
Artur Davtyan	8 August 1992	Artur Davtyan
Vahagn Davtyan	18 August 1988	Vahagn Davtyan
Hamlet Manukyan	22 August 2007	Hamlet Manukyan
Harutyun Merdinyan	16 August 1984	Harutyun Merdinyan

Australia
Gymnast	Dates	FIG listing
Philippe Rizzo	9 February 1981	Philippe Rizzo
Joshua Jefferis	29 August 1985	Joshua Jefferis
Damian Istria	24 August 1982	Damian Istria

== B ==
Belarus
Gymnast	Dates	FIG listing
Ivan Ivankov	10 April 1975	Ivan Ivankov
Vitaly Scherbo	13 January 1972	Vitaly Scherbo
Ivan Pavlovsky	2 December 1976	

Brazil
Gymnast	Dates	FIG listing
Diego Hypólito	19 June 1986	Diego Hypólito
Arthur Mariano	18 September 1993	Arthur Mariano
Arthur Zanetti	16 April 1990	Arthur Zanetti

Bulgaria
Gymnast	Dates	FIG listing
Yordan Yovchev	24 February 1973	Yordan Yovchev

== C ==
Canada
Gymnast	Dates	FIG listing
Zachary Clay	5 July 1995	Zachary Clay
René Cournoyer	23 April 1997	René Cournoyer
Félix Dolci	5 May 2002	Félix Dolci
William Émard	17 March 2000	William Émard
Jayson Rampersad	31 July 2003	Jayson Rampersad
Kyle Shewfelt	6 May 1982	Kyle Shewfelt
Samuel Zakutney	6 October 1998	Samuel Zakutney

China
Gymnast	Dates	FIG listing
Chen Yibing	19 December 1984	Chen Yibing
Li Ning	10 March 1963	Li Ning
Li Xiaopeng	27 Jul5 1981	Li Xiaopeng
Lou Yun	1964	Lou Yun
Xiao Qin	1 January 19853	Xiao Qin
Yang Wei	8 February 1980	Yang Wei
Zou Kai	25 February 1988	Zou Kai

== E ==
Egypt
Gymnast	Dates	FIG listing
Mohamed Afify	10 November 2001	Mohamed Afify
Omar Mohamed	10 February 1999	Omar Mohamed
Mahmoud Safwat	16 November 1929	

== F ==
France
Gymnast	Dates	FIG listing
Louis Ségura	23 July 1889 (Note: "Louis Ségura Olympic medals and stats". databaseOlympics.com.)–1963	Louis Ségura
Marco Torrès	22 January 1888 – 15 January 1963	Marco Torrès

Finland
Gymnast	Dates	FIG listing
Paavo Aaltonen	11 December 1919 – 9 September 1962	Paavo Aaltonen
Veikko Huhtanen	5 June 1919 – 29 January 1976	Veikko Huhtanen
Heikki Savolainen	1907 (Note: Heikki Savolainen's date of birth in his FIG record conflicts with his stated age of 44 at the 1952 Olympics); 7 September 1928–29 November 1997	Heikki Savolainen

== G ==
Germany
Gymnast	Dates	FIG listing
Valery Belenky (Note: Valery Belenky represented Germany and the USSR)	5 September 1969	Valery Belenky
Philipp Boy	23 July 1987	Philipp Boy
Andreas Bretschneider	4 August 1989	Andreas Bretschneider
Roland Brückner (Note: Roland Brückner represented East Germany)	14 December 1955	Roland Brückner
Lukas Dauser	15 June 1993	Lukas Dauser
Nils Dunkel	20 February 1997	Nils Dunkel
Konrad Frey (Note: Konrad Frey represented Germany before it was divided into East and West Germany after World War II)	24 April 1909	Konrad Frey
Eberhard Gienger	21 July 1951	Eberhard Gienger
Fabian Hambüchen	25 October 1987	Fabian Hambüchen
Philipp Herder	21 October 1992	Philipp Herder
Sylvio Kroll (Note: Sylvio Kroll represented East Germany)	29 April 1965	Sylvio Kroll
Marcel Nguyen	8 September 1987	Marcel Nguyen
Sven Tippelt (Note: Sven Tippelt represented East Germany)	3 June 1965	Sven Tippelt
Andreas Toba	7 October 1990	Andreas Toba
Andreas Wecker	2 January 1970	Andreas Wecker

Great Britain
Gymnast	Dates	FIG listing
Brinn Bevan	16 June 1997	Brinn Bevan
Daniel Keatings	4 January 1990	Daniel Keatings
Sam Oldham	17 February 1993	Sam Oldham
Daniel Purvis	13 November 1990	Daniel Purvis
Giarnni Regini-Moran	2 August 1998	Giarnni Regini-Moran
Louis Smith	24 April 1989	Louis Smith
Kristian Thomas	14 February 1989	Kristian Thomas
Max Whitlock	13 January 1993	Max Whitlock
Nile Wilson	17 January 1996	Nile Wilson

Greece
Gymnast	Dates	FIG listing
Vlasios Maras	31 March 1983	Vlasios Maras

== H ==
Hungary
Gymnast	Dates	FIG listing
Szilveszter Csollány	13 April 1970	Szilveszter Csollány
Zoltán Supola	25 September 1970	Zoltán Supola

== I ==
Italy
Gymnast	Dates	FIG listing
Alberto Braglia	1883	Alberto Braglia
Igor Cassina	15 August 1977	Igor Cassina
Yuri Chechi	11 October 1969	Yuri Chechi
Franco Menichelli	1941	Franco Menichelli
Romeo Neri	1903	Romeo Neri
Giorgio Zampori	1887	Giorgio Zampori

== J ==
Japan
Gymnast	Dates	FIG listing
Takehiro Kashima	6 July 1980	Takehiro Kashima
Sawao Kato	11 October 1946	Sawao Kato
Ryohei Kato	9 September 1993	Ryohei Kato
Hisashi Mizutori	27 July 1980	Hisashi Mizutori
Akinori Nakayama	1943	Akinori Nakayama
Takashi Ono	1931	Takashi Ono
Kenzo Shirai	24 August 1996	Kenzo Shirai
Masao Takemoto	29 September 1919	Masao Takemoto
Yusuke Tanaka	29 November 1989	Yusuke Tanaka
Mitsuo Tsukahara	22 December 1947	Mitsuo Tsukahara
Naoya Tsukahara	25 June 1977	Naoya Tsukahara
Hiroyuki Tomita	21 November 1980	Hiroyuki Tomita
Kōhei Uchimura	3 January 1989	Kōhei Uchimura
Isao Yoneda	20 August 1977	Isao Yoneda

== L ==
Latvia
Gymnast	Dates	FIG listing
Evgeni Sapronenko	11 November 1978	Evgeni Sapronenko
Igors Vihrovs	6 June 1978	Igors Vihrovs

== Luxembourg ==
- Mathias Logelin, two-time Olympian (1928, 1936), and medalist at the 1934 World Artistic Gymnastics Championships.

== M ==
Mexico
Gymnast	Dates	FIG listing
Daniel Corral	25 January 1990	Daniel Corral

== N ==
Netherlands
Gymnast	Dates	FIG listing
Yuri van Gelder	20 April 1993	Yuri van Gelder (Note: Yuri van Gelder's FIG revord is in his given name of Lambertus van Gelder)
Jeffrey Wammes	24 April 1987	Jeffrey Wammes
Epke Zonderland	16 April 1986	Epke Zonderland

North Korea
Gymnast	Dates	FIG listing
Pae Gil-su	4 March 1972	Pae Gil-su
Ri Se-gwang	21 January 1985	Ri Se-gwang

== R ==
Romania
Gymnast	Dates	FIG listing
Marian Drăgulescu	18 December 1980	Marian Drăgulescu
Ioan Silviu Suciu	24 November 1977	Ioan Silviu Suciu
Marius Urzică	30 September 1975	Marius Urzică

Russia
Gymnast	Dates	FIG listing
Denis Ablyazin	3 August 1992	Denis Ablyazin
Nikolai Andrianov (Note: Nikolai Andrianov has represented Russia and the USSR)	14 October 1952 – 21 March 2011	Nikolai Andrianov
Aleksandr Balandin	20 June 1989	Aleksandr Balandin
David Belyavskiy	23 February 1992	David Belyavskiy
Dmitry Bilozerchev (Note: Dmitry Bilozerchev has represented Russia and the USSR)	22 December 1966	Dmitry Bilozerchev
Alexei Bondarenko	23 August 1978	Alexei Bondarenko
Yuri Busse	16 July 2001	Yuri Busse
Artur Dalaloyan	26 April 1996	Artur Dalaloyan
Emin Garibov	9 August 1990	Emin Garibov
Anton Golotsutskov	28 July 1985	Anton Golotsutskov
Nikita Ignatyev	21 June 1992	Nikita Ignatyev
Yuri Korolev (Note: Yuri Korolev has represented Russia and the USSR)	28 August 1962	Yuri Korolev
Nikolai Kryukov	11 November 1978	Nikolai Kryukov
Nikolai Kuksenkov	2 June 1989	Nikolai Kuksenkov
Valeri Liukin (Note: Valeri Liukin has represented Russia and the USSR)	5 September 1969	Valeri Liukin
Andrey Makolov	12 June 1998	Andrei Makolov
Nikita Nagornyy	12 February 1997	Nikita Nagornyy
Sergei Naidin	11 July 2001	Sergei Naidin
Alexei Nemov	28 April 1976	Alexei Nemov
Yuri Ryazanov	21 March 1987 – 20 October 2009	Yuri Ryazanov
Ivan Stretovich	6 October 1996	Ivan Stretovich
Boris Shakhlin (Note: Boris Chakhline appears to show Boris Shakhlin, but representing Ukraine)	27 January 1932 – 27 May 2008	Boris Chakhline
Yuri Titov (Note: Yuri Titov has represented Russia and the USSR)	27 November 1935	Yuri Titov
Aleksandr Tkachyov (Note: Aleksandr Tkachyov has represented Russia and the USSR.)	4 October 1957	Alexander Tkachyov
Mikhail Voronin (Note: Mikhail Voronin has represented Russia and the USSR)	26 March 1945 – 22 May 2004	Mikhail Voronin

== S ==
Slovenia
Gymnast	Dates	FIG listing
Mitja Petkovšek	16 February 1977	Mitja Petkovšek
Miro Cerar	28 October 1939	Miro Cerar
Aljaž Pegan	2 June 1974	Aljaž Pegan
Leon Štukelj	12 November 1898	Leon Štukelj

South Korea
Gymnast	Dates	FIG listing
Kim Dae-eun	17 September 1984	Kim Dae-eun
Yang Hak-seon	6 December 1992	Yang Hak-seon
Park Min-soo	21 November 1994	Park Min-soo
Yang Tae-young	8 July 1980	Yang Tae-young

USSR
Gymnast	Dates	FIG listing
Nikolai Andrianov	14 October 1952	Nikolai Andrianov
Albert Azaryan	30 November 1993	Albert Azaryan
Valery Belenky	5 September 1969	Valery Belenky
Dmitry Bilozerchev	22 December 1966	Dmitry Bilozerchev
Viktor Chukarin	9 November 1921 – 1984	Viktor Chukarin
Alexander Dityatin	7 August 1957	Alexander Dityatin
Yuri Korolev	28 August 1962	Yuri Korolev
Valeri Liukin	5 September 1969	Valeri Liukin
Boris Shakhlin	27 January 1932 – 27 May 2008	Boris Chakhline
Yuri Titov	27 November 1935	Yuri Titov
Aleksandr Tkachyov	4 October 1957	Alexander Tkachyov
Mikhail Voronin	26 March 1945 – 22 May 2004	Mikhail Voronin

Spain
Gymnast	Dates	FIG listing
Joaquín Blume	21 June 1933 – 29 April 1959	
Gervasio Deferr	7 November 1980	Gervasio Deferr
Rafael Martinez	10 December 1983	Rafael Martinez

Switzerland
Gymnast	Dates	FIG listing
Eugen Mack	21 September 1907–29 October 1978	Daniel Keatings

== U ==
Ukraine
Gymnast	Dates	FIG listing
Alexander Beresch	12 October 1977 – 29 February 2004	Alexander Beresch
Valeri Goncharov	19 September 1977	Valeri Goncharov
Illia Kovtun	10 August 2003	Illia Kovtun
Igor Radivilov	19 October 1992	Igor Radivilov
Oleg Stepko	15 March 1994	Oleg Stepko
Oleg Verniaiev	29 September 1993	Oleg Verniaiev

USA
Gymnast	Dates	FIG listing
Alexander Artemev	29 August 1985	Alexander Artemev
Raj Bhavsar	7 September 1980	Raj Bhavsar
Brandon Briones	29 April 2001	Brandon Briones
Chris Brooks	19 December 1986	Chris Brooks
Bart Conner	3 March 1958	Bart Conner
Tim Daggett	22 April 1965	Tim Daggett
Jacob Dalton	19 August 1991	Jacob Dalton
George Eyser	31 August 1870, death unknown	George Eyser
Mitch Gaylord	10 March 1961	Mitch Gaylord
Morgan Hamm	24 September 1982	Morgan Hamm
Paul Hamm	24 September 1982	Paul Hamm
Anton Heida	1878	
Jonathan Horton	31 December 1985	Jonathan Horton
Danell Leyva	30 October 1991	Danell Leyva
Brody Malone	7 January 2000	Brody Malone
Sam Mikulak	13 October 1992	Sam Mikulak
Yul Moldauer	26 August 1996	Yul Moldauer
Alexander Naddour	4 March 1991	Alexander Naddour
Stephen Nedoroscik	28 October 1998	Stephen Nedoroscik
John Orozco	30 December 1992	John Orozco
Paul Ruggeri	12 November 1988	Paul Ruggeri
Justin Spring	11 March 1984	Justin Spring
Kevin Tan	24 September 1981	Kevin Tan
Kurt Thomas	29 March 1956	Kurt Thomas
Peter Vidmar	3 June 1961	Peter Vidmar
Donnell Whittenburg	18 August 1994	Donnell Whittenburg
Blaine Wilson	3 August 1974	Blaine Wilson
Shane Wiskus	1 October 1998	Shane Wiskus
Brandon Wynn	4 November 1988	Brandon Wynn
Alec Yoder	21 January 1997	Alec Yoder

== See also ==
- List of gymnasts
- International Gymnastics Hall of Fame
- List of Olympic medalists in gymnastics (men)
