= Gymnastics at the 1996 Summer Olympics – Men's floor =

Men's floor at the Games of the XXVI Olympiad
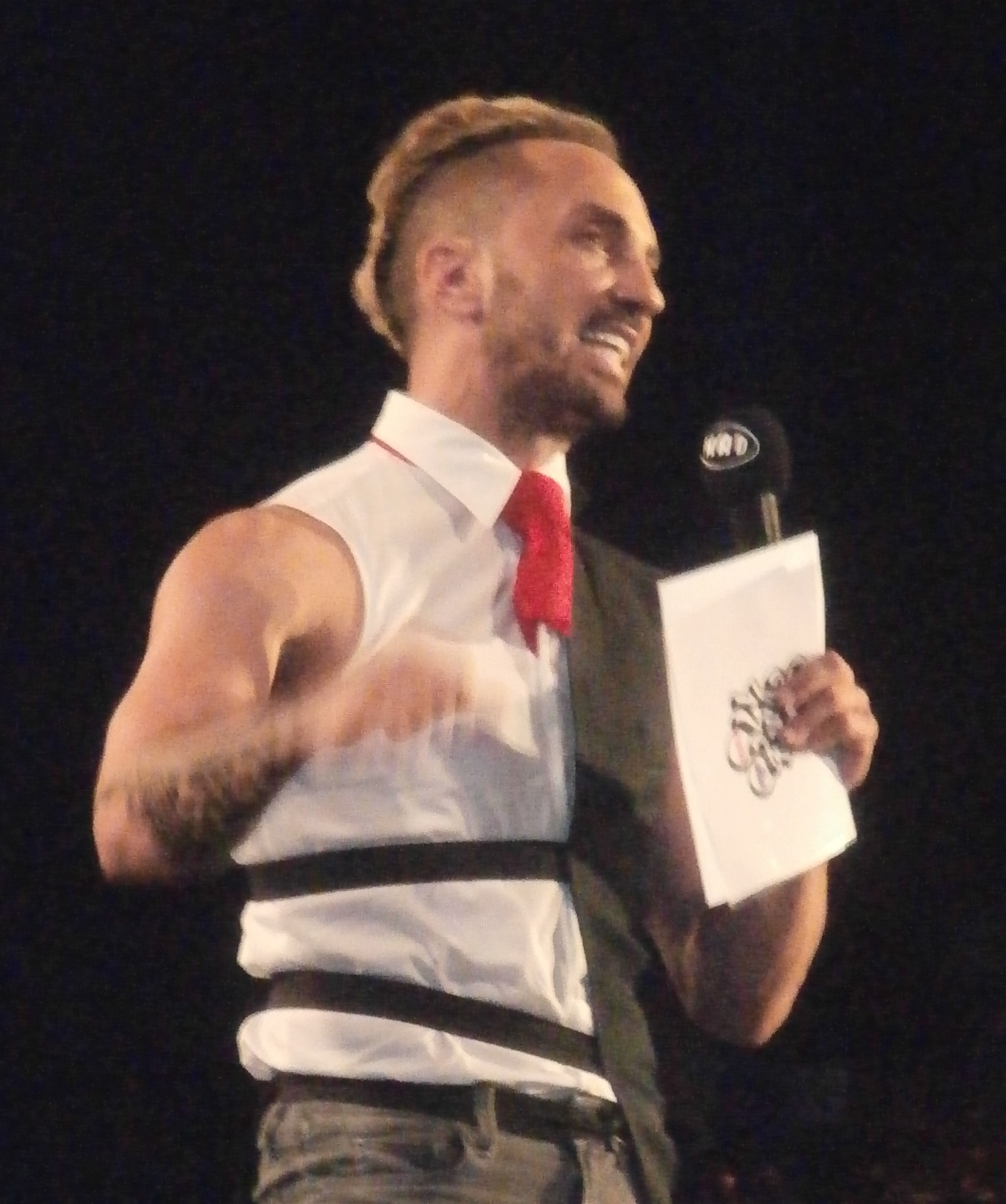
- Gold medalist Ioannis Melissanidis (2017)

Medalists
1st place, gold medalist(s)		Ioannis Melissanidis	Greece
2nd place, silver medalist(s)		Li Xiaoshuang	China
3rd place, bronze medalist(s)		Alexei Nemov	Russia

These are the results of the men's floor competition, one of eight events for male competitors in artistic gymnastics at the 1996 Summer Olympics in Atlanta. The qualification and final rounds took place on July 20, 22 and 28th at the Georgia Dome.

== Results ==
=== Qualification ===
Ninety-three gymnasts competed in the floor event during the compulsory and optional rounds on July 20 and 22. The eight highest scoring gymnasts advanced to the final on July 28. Each country was limited to two competitors in the final.

Rank	Gymnast	Score
1	Yevgeni Podgorny (RUS)	19.549
2	Vitaly Scherbo (BLR)	19.462
3	Alexei Nemov (RUS)	19.450
4	Ioannis Melissanidis (GRE)	19.375
5	Grigory Misutin (UKR)	19.362
6	Li Xiaoshuang (CHN)	19.350
8	Ivan Ivanov (BUL)	19.324
8	Thierry Aymes (FRA)	19.324

=== Final ===
Rank	Gymnast	Score
Gold medal	Ioannis Melissanidis (GRE)	9.850
Silver medal	Li Xiaoshuang (CHN)	9.837
Bronze medal	Alexei Nemov (RUS)	9.800
4	Ivan Ivanov (BUL)	9.750
4	Thierry Aymes (FRA)	9.750
6	Yevgeni Podgorny (RUS)	9.550
7	Vitaly Scherbo (BLR)	9.275
8	Grigory Misutin (UKR)	9.100
