= 1998 European Artistic Gymnastics Championships =

The 1998 European Artistic Gymnastics Championships consisted of the following competitions held in Saint Petersburg, Russia, from 30 April to 3 May 1998:

- 1998 European Men's Artistic Gymnastics Championships;
- 1998 European Women's Artistic Gymnastics Championships.
