= Pescaru =

Pescaru is a Romanian-language surname derived from the occupation of fisherman (Romanian: pescar). Notable people with this surname include:

- Nicolae Pescaru, Romanian footballer
- Florentin Pescaru, Romanian gymnast
