= Gymnastics at the 2000 Summer Olympics – Men's floor =

Men's floor at the Games of the XXVII Olympiad

Medalists
1st place, gold medalist(s)		Igors Vihrovs	Latvia
2nd place, silver medalist(s)		Alexei Nemov	Russia
3rd place, bronze medalist(s)		Yordan Yovchev	Bulgaria

Men's floor was one of eight events for male competitors in artistic gymnastics at the 2000 Summer Olympics in Sydney. The qualification round took place on September 17, with 76 gymnasts taking part. The eight highest scoring gymnasts competed in the final on September 24 at the Sydney SuperDome. The event was won by Igors Vihrovs, becoming the first Olympic gold medalist for independent Latvia.

== Results ==
=== Qualification ===
Seventy-six gymnasts competed in the floor event during the qualification round on September 16. The eight highest scoring gymnasts advanced to the final on September 24. Each country was limited to two competitors in the final.

=== Final ===
Rank	Gymnast	Score
Gold medal	Igors Vihrovs (LAT)	9.812
Silver medal	Alexei Nemov (RUS)	9.800
Bronze medal	Yordan Yovchev (BUL)	9.787
4	Yang Wei (CHN)	9.750
5	Li Xiaopeng (CHN)	9.737
6	Marian Drăgulescu (ROU)	9.712
7	Morgan Hamm (USA)	9.262
8	Yevgeni Podgorny (RUS)	8.550
