= Gymnastics at the 2000 Summer Olympics – Men's pommel horse =

Olympic gymnastics event

Men's pommel horse at the Games of the XXVII Olympiad
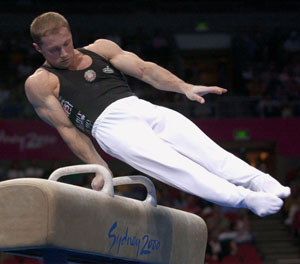
- Pommel horse competition (Ivan Ivankov in the qualifying round)
- Venue: Sydney SuperDome
- Dates: 16 September 2000 (qualifying); 24 September 2000 (final)
- Competitors: 80 from 29 nations
- Winning score: 9.862

Medalists
1st place, gold medalist(s)		Marius Urzică; Romania
2nd place, silver medalist(s)		Eric Poujade; France
3rd place, bronze medalist(s)		Alexei Nemov; Russia

The men's pommel horse competition was one of eight events for male competitors in artistic gymnastics at the 2000 Summer Olympics in Sydney. The qualification and final rounds took place on September 16 and 24 at the Sydney SuperDome. There were 80 competitors from 29 nations; nations competing in the team event could have up to 5 gymnasts in the vault, while other nations could have up to 2 gymnasts. The event was won by Marius Urzică of Romania, the nation's first victory in the men's pommel horse. France earned its first medal in the event, with Eric Poujade's silver. Bronze went to Alexei Nemov of Russia, his second consecutive bronze medal in the event. Urzică (silver medalist in 1996) and Nemov were the eighth and ninth men to win multiple medals in the pommel horse.

== Background ==
This was the 20th appearance of the event, which is one of the five apparatus events held every time there were apparatus events at the Summer Olympics (no apparatus events were held in 1900, 1908, 1912, or 1920). Four of the eight finalists from 1996 returned: silver medalist Marius Urzică of Romania, bronze medalist Alexei Nemov of Russia, and fourth-place finisher Patrice Casimir and seventh-place finisher Eric Poujade of France. Nemov was the reigning (1999) world champion, with Urzică the runner-up.

Latvia made its debut in the men's pommel horse. The United States made its 18th appearance, most of any nation; the Americans had missed only the inaugural 1896 pommel horse and the boycotted 1980 Games.

== Competition format ==
The 1996 gymnastics competition had introduced the "7–6–5" format, in which each team had 7 members, designated 6 for each apparatus, and had 5 count for team scores. In 2000, this was reduced across the board to a "6–5–4" format. Further, while in 1996 all 7 team members could compete on each apparatus for individual purposes, in 2000 only the 5 designated for that apparatus competed. The 2000 competition also eliminated the compulsory exercises; only voluntary exercises were done on each apparatus. The qualifying round scores were used for qualification for the team all-around, individual all-around, and apparatus finals.

The top eight gymnasts, with a limit of two per nation, advanced to the final. Non-finalists were ranked 9th through 80th based on preliminary score. The preliminary score had no effect on the final; once the eight finalists were selected, their ranking depended only on the final exercise.

== Schedule ==
All times are Australian Eastern Standard Time (UTC+10)

Date	Time	Round
Saturday, 16 September 2000		Qualifying
Sunday, 24 September 2000	16:48	Final

== Results ==
=== Qualifying ===
Eighty gymnasts competed in the pommel horse event during the qualification round on September 16. The eight highest scoring gymnasts advanced to the final on September 24. Each country was limited to two competitors in the final.

=== Final ===
Rank	Gymnast	Nation	Score
1st place, gold medalist(s)	Marius Urzică	Romania	9.862
2nd place, silver medalist(s)	Eric Poujade	France	9.825
3rd place, bronze medalist(s)	Alexei Nemov	Russia	9.800
4	Lee Jang-hyung	South Korea	9.775
5	Pae Gil-Su	North Korea	9.762
6	Zoltán Supola	Hungary	9.762
7	Oleksandr Beresch	Ukraine	9.712
8	Nikolai Kryukov	Russia	9.700
