= Igors Vihrovs =

Latvian artistic gymnast (born 1978)

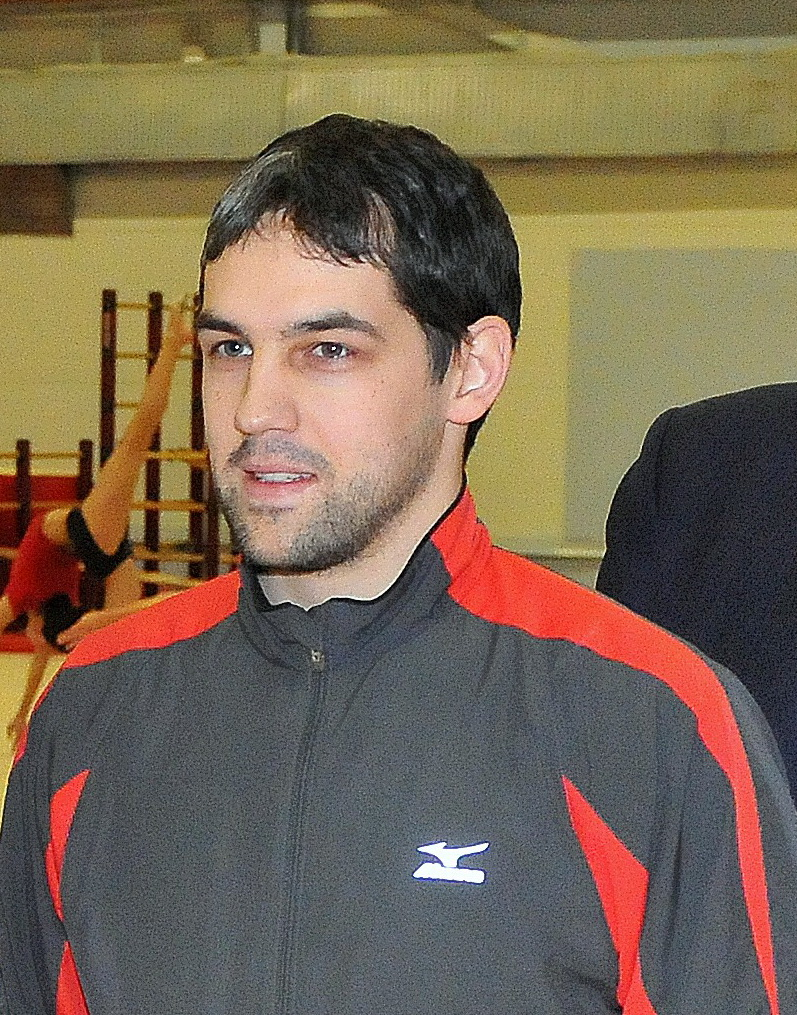
- Vihrovs in 2011

Personal information
- Born: 6 June 1978 (age 48) Riga, Latvia
- Height: 165 cm (5 ft 5 in)

Gymnastics career
- Discipline: Men's artistic gymnastics
- Country represented: Latvia
Medal record
Olympic Games
| Gold medal – first place | 2000 Sydney | Floor exercise |
World Championships
| Bronze medal – third place | 2001 Ghent | Floor exercise |
Summer Universiade
| Silver medal – second place | 2001 Beijing | Floor exercise |

Igors Vihrovs (born 6 June 1978) is a Latvian former artistic gymnast. He won the gold medal on the floor exercise at the 2000 Summer Olympics, becoming the first Olympic gold medalist for independent Latvia. He is the 2001 World Championships floor exercise bronze medalist.

== Gymnastics career ==
Vihrovs competed at the 1997 World Championships and finished 23rd in the all-around final. He won a silver medal on the floor exercise at the 1999 Stuttgart World Cup, behind Russia's Alexei Nemov. He then won a gold medal on the floor exercise at the 2000 Ljubljana World Cup.

Vihrovs represented Latvia at the 2000 Summer Olympics and qualified for the floor exercise final in fourth place with a score of 9.662. In the final, he won the gold medal with a score of 9.812 to defeat the favored Nemov by 0.012 points. This marked the first time Latvia won an Olympic gold medal as an independent country. After the Olympic Games, he competed at the 2000 Stuttgart World Cup and won another floor exercise gold medal.

At the 2001 Summer Universiade, Vihrovs won the silver medal on the floor exercise behind China's Liang Fuliang. He then placed sixth in the floor exercise final at the 2001 Goodwill Games. He went on to win the bronze medal in the floor exercise final at the 2001 World Championships, behind Marian Drăgulescu and Yordan Yovchev. He also qualified for the vault final and finished eighth. After the World Championships, he competed at the Stuttgart World Cup and won the silver medal on the floor exercise behind teammate Jevgēņijs Saproņenko. He then won the gold medal over Saproņenko at the Glasgow World Cup.

Vihrovs won a bronze medal on the floor exercise at the 2003 Paris World Cup. He finished sixth in the floor exercise final at the 2003 World Championships. Then at the 2003 Glasgow World Cup, he won a floor exercise silver medal behind Canada's Kyle Shewfelt.

Vihrovs won a gold medal on the floor exercise at the 2004 Cottbus World Cup. At the 2004 European Championships, he finished ninth in the all-around final and seventh in the floor exercise final. He then represented Latvia at the 2004 Summer Olympics and advanced to the all-around final, finishing in 18th place.

Vihrovs only competed on the horizontal bar at the 2005 World Championships and did not advance to the final. He then competed on the still rings, vault, and horizontal bar at the 2006 World Championships and did not advance into any finals.

== Personal life ==
Vihrovs coached his daughter, Elīna Vihrova, who went on to compete for Pennsylvania State University's gymnastics team.
