= Thiérry Aymes =

French gymnast

- Born: 15 October 1973 (age 52) Ollioules, France

Gymnastics career
- Discipline: Men's artistic gymnastics
- Country represented: France
Medal record
Representing France
European Championships
Gold medal – first place	1998 Saint Petersburg	Team

Thiérry Aymes (born 15 October 1973) is a French former gymnast. He tied for fourth place in the floor final at the 1996 Summer Olympics.

== Biography ==
He competed in the 1996 Summer Olympics, finishing fourth in the floor exercise, and won the gold medal in the team competition at the 1998 European Championships in Saint Petersburg.

He has been a coach with Étoile de Monaco.
