= Makare Desilets =

American volleyball player (born 1976)

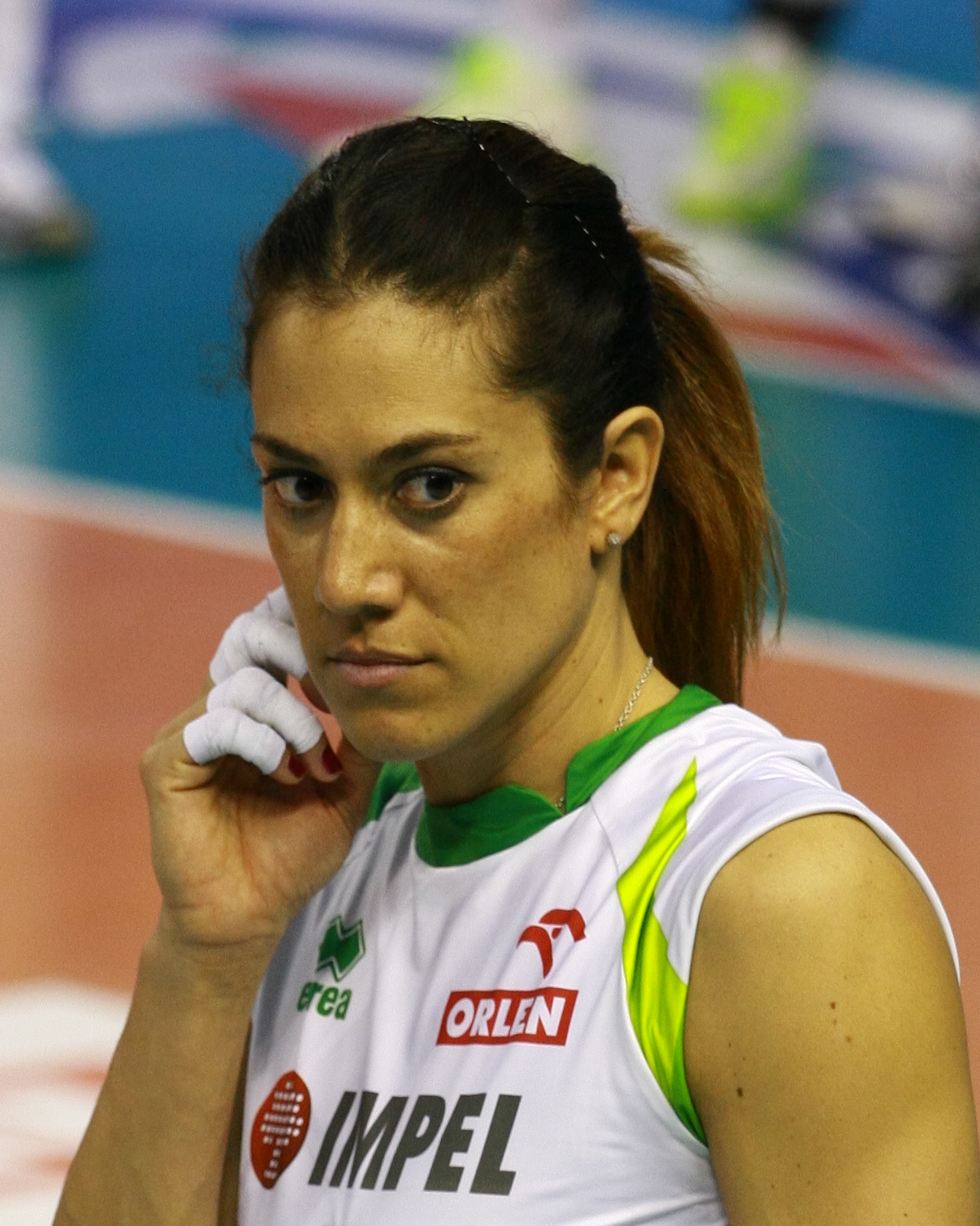

Personal information
- Nationality: American
- Born: June 26, 1976 (age 50)
- Height: 6 ft 2 in (188 cm)
- Spike: 127 in (323 cm)
- Block: 121 in (307 cm)

Volleyball information
- Number: 3 (national team)

National team
1998	United States

Makare Desilets (born June 26, 1976) is a retired American female volleyball player. She was part of the United States women's national volleyball team at the 1998 FIVB Volleyball Women's World Championship in Japan.
