= Vasil Vetsev =

Bulgarian gymnast (born 1974)

- Васил Вецев
- Born: 21 January 1974 (age 52) Sofia, Bulgaria

Gymnastics career
- Discipline: Men's artistic gymnastics
- Country represented: Bulgaria

Vasil Vetsev (Bulgarian: Васил Вецев) (born 21 January 1974) is a Bulgarian gymnast. He competed at the 1996 Summer Olympics and the 2000 Summer Olympics.
