= Valeriy Pereshkura =

Ukrainian gymnast (born 1977)

- Валерій Валерійович Перешкура
- Full name: Valeriy Valeriyovych Pereshkura
- Born: 20 September 1977 (age 48) Krasnoyarsk, Ukrainian SSR, Soviet Union
- Height: 1.67 m (5 ft 6 in)

Gymnastics career
- Discipline: Men's artistic gymnastics
- Country represented: Ukraine
- Club: Dynamo Cherkasy
Medal record
Men's artistic gymnastics
Representing Ukraine
Olympic Games
Silver medal – second place	2000 Sydney	Team
European Championships
Bronze medal – third place	2000 Bremen	Team
European Team Championships
Bronze medal – third place	1997 Paris	Team

Valeriy Valeriyovych Pereshkura (born 20 September 1977) is a Ukrainian gymnast. He competed at the 2000 Summer Olympics winning a silver medal in the men's artistic team all-around event.
