= Xiao Junfeng =

Chinese artistic gymnast (born 1979)

- Born: 12 July 1979 (age 47) Xi'an, Shaanxi, China

Gymnastics career
- Discipline: Men's artistic gymnastics
- Country represented: China
Medal record
Olympics
Gold medal – first place	2000 Sydney	Team
World Championships
Gold medal – first place	1997 Lausanne	Team

Xiao Junfeng (Chinese: 肖俊峰; pinyin: Xiào Jùnfēng; born July 12, 1979, in Xi'an, Shaanxi) is a male Chinese gymnast. Xiao was part of the Chinese team that won the gold medal in the team event at the 2000 Summer Olympics in Sydney.

== Major performances ==
- 1995 National Inter-city Games - 3rd vaulting horse
- 1997 World Championships - 1st team
- 1997 National Games - 1st vaulting horse
- 1999 National Championships - 1st team
- 1999 National Champions Tournament - 1st vaulting horse
- 2000 World Cup Series Switzerland leg - 1st vaulting horse
- 2000 International Gymnastics Grand Prix - 1st vaulting horse
- 2000 National Championships - 1st vaulting horse
