= Jung Jin-soo =

South Korean gymnast (born 1972)

- 정진수
- Alternative name: Jeong Jin-su
- Born: 15 August 1972 (age 54)
- Height: 1.60 m (5 ft 3 in)

Gymnastics career
- Discipline: Men's artistic gymnastics
- Country represented: South Korea
- Club: Daegu Bank; Chunbuk Provincial Office
Medal record
Representing South Korea
Asian Games
Silver medal – second place	1994 Hiroshima	Team
Silver medal – second place	1994 Hiroshima	Parallel Bars
Bronze medal – third place	1990 Beijing	Team

Jung Jin-soo (born 15 August 1972) is a South Korean gymnast. He competed at the 1992 Summer Olympics, the 1996 Summer Olympics and the 2000 Summer Olympics.
