= Raouf Abdelraouf =

Egyptian gymnast (born 1978)

- رؤوف عبدالكريم عبد الرؤوف
- Full name: Raouf Abdelkarim Abdelraouf
- Alternative names: Raouf Abdel Karim; Raouf Ali
- Born: 23 January 1978 (age 48) Cairo, Egypt
- Height: 1.67 m (5 ft 6 in)

Gymnastics career
- Discipline: Men's artistic gymnastics
- Country represented: Egypt
- Club: Cairo Club
Medal record
Men's artistic gymnastics
Representing Egypt
Mediterranean Games
Gold medal – first place	1997 Bari	Vault
Bronze medal – third place	2001 Tunis	Vault
African Games
Gold medal – first place	2003 Abuja	Vault
Silver medal – second place	1995 Harare	Floor
Silver medal – second place	1995 Harare	Parallel bars
Bronze medal – third place	2003 Abuja	Rings

Raouf Abdelkarim Abdelraouf OLY (Egyptian Arabic: رؤوف عبد الرؤوف, born 23 January 1978 in Cairo) is an Egyptian gymnast. He competed in the 2000 Summer Olympics.

He was the first African gymnast to win a World Cup in history. He also won two medals on vault at the Mediterranean Games - a gold at 1997 Bari and a bronze at 2001 Tunis.
