= Dimitrij Nonin =

German gymnast (born 1979)

- Born: 5 April 1979 (age 47) Dnipropetrovsk, Ukrainian SSR, Soviet Union
- Height: 1.71 m (5 ft 7 in)

Gymnastics career
- Discipline: Men's artistic gymnastics
- Country represented: Germany
- Club: Sportclub Berlin
Medal record
Men's artistic gymnastics
Representing Germany
European Championships
Bronze medal – third place	1998 Saint Petersburg	Team
Bronze medal – third place	1998 Saint Petersburg	Horizontal bar

Dimitrij Nonin (born 5 April 1979) is a German gymnast. He finished 21st in the all around at the 2000 Summer Olympics.
