= Zheng Lihui =

Chinese artistic gymnast

- 鄭 李輝
- Born: 4 May 1978 (age 48) Xiantao, Hubei, China

Gymnastics career
- Discipline: Men's artistic gymnastics
- Country represented: China
Medal record
Men's artistic gymnastics
Representing China
Olympic Games
Gold medal – first place	2000 Sydney	Team

Zheng Lihui (simplified Chinese: 郑李辉; traditional Chinese: 鄭李輝; pinyin: Zhèng Lǐhuī; born 1980 in Xiantao, Hubei) is a male Chinese gymnast. Xiao was part of the Chinese team that won the gold medal in the team event at the 2000 Summer Olympics in Sydney.

== Major performances ==
- 1996 National Championships - 1st team
- 1997 Catania World University Games - 1st individual all-around & team
- 1998 National Championships - 1st team (226.925pts)
- 1999 National Championships - 2nd team
- 1999 National Champions Tournament - 2nd individual all-around
- 2000 National Championships & Olympic Selective Trials - 4th individual all-around 2000 Sydney Olympic Games - 1st team
