= Benjamin Varonian =

French-Armenian gymnast

- Full name: Benjamin Gabriel Jean Varonian
- Born: 15 June 1980 (age 46) Nice, France
- Height: 5 ft 6 in (168 cm)

Gymnastics career
- Discipline: Men's artistic gymnastics
- Country represented: France
- Club: O.A.J.L.P. Antibes
Medal record
Olympic Games
Silver medal – second place	2000 Sydney	Horizontal bar

Benjamin Varonian (born 15 June 1980 in Nice, France) is a French-Armenian Olympic gymnast.

Varonian won two gold medals in the parallel bars and team all-around at the 1998 European Junior Gymnastics Championships. He competed at the 2000 Summer Olympics and won an Olympic silver medal in the horizontal bar. Varonian and Éric Poujade both became the first-ever French gymnasts to win Olympic medals in gymnastics in a non-boycotted Olympics.
