= Rene Tschernitschek =

German gymnast

- Born: 30 March 1977 (age 49) Halle, East Germany
- Height: 1.79 m (5 ft 10 in)

Gymnastics career
- Discipline: Men's artistic gymnastics
- Country represented: Germany
- Club: Sportverein Halle

Rene Tschernitschek (born 30 March 1977) is a German gymnast. He competed in at the 2000 Summer Olympics.
