= Ioannis Melissanidis =

Greek artistic gymnast

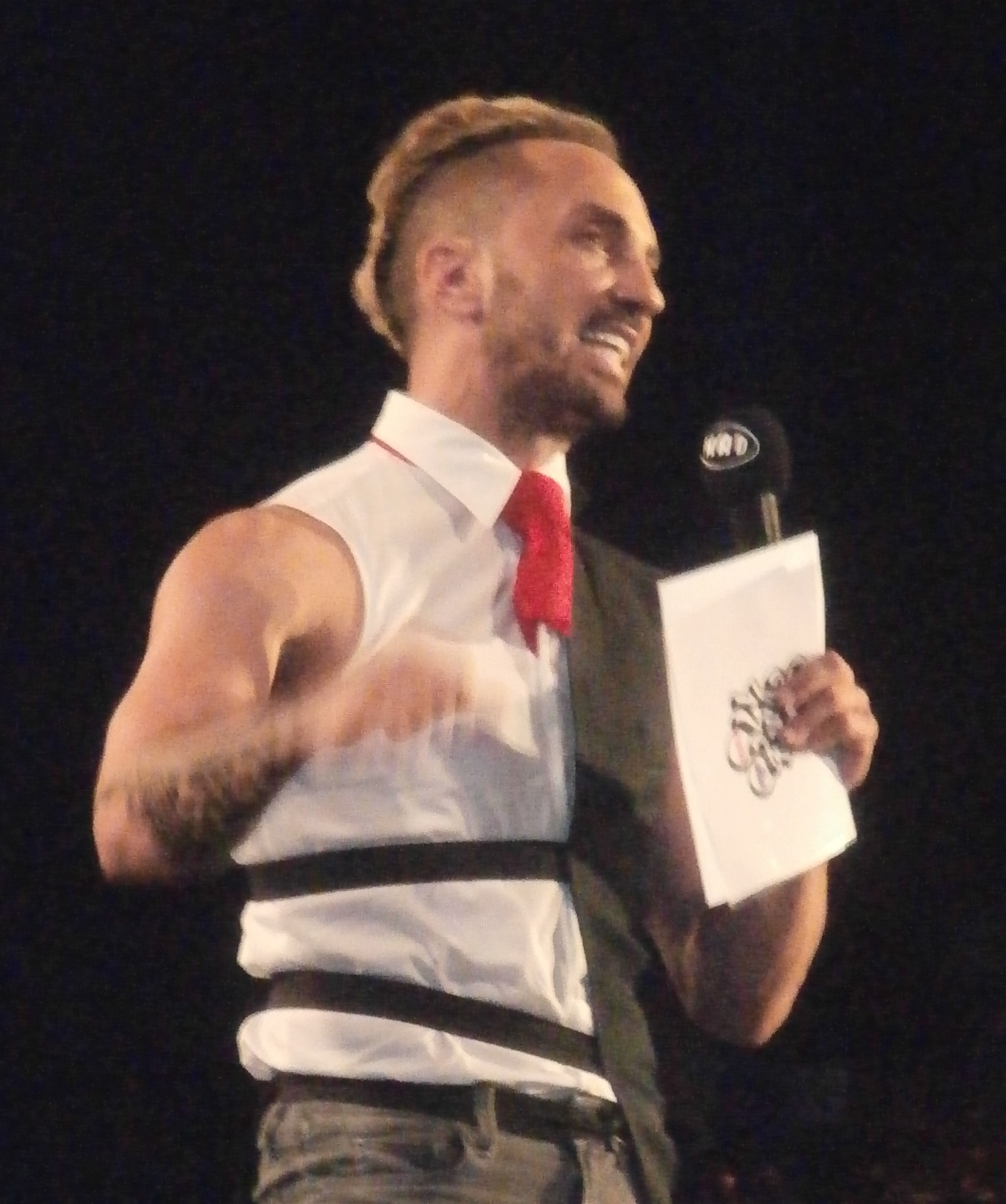
- Ioannis Melissanidis in 2017

Personal information
- Full name: Ioannis Melissanidis
- Born: 27 March 1977 (age 49) Dachau, Bavaria, West Germany

Gymnastics career
- Discipline: Men's artistic gymnastics
- Country represented: Greece
- Club: Spartacus
- Eponymous skills: Melissanidis vault
Medal record
Artistic Gymnastics
Olympic Games
| Gold medal – first place | 1996 Atlanta | Floor Exercise |
World Championships
| Silver medal – second place | 1994 Brisbane | Floor exercise |
European Championships
| Gold medal – first place | 1998 St. Petersburg | Vault |
| Silver medal – second place | 1998 St. Petersburg | Floor exercise |
European Team Championships
| Bronze medal – third place | 1999 Patras | Team |

Ioannis Melissanidis (Greek: Ιωάννης Μελισσανίδης; born 27 March 1977) is a retired Greek artistic gymnast and the 1996 Olympic champion on the floor exercise. He was also the first Greek gymnast ever to medal at the World Championships. He was named one of the 1996 Greek Male Athletes of the Year.

== Early life ==
Melissanidis was born in Dachau, Bavaria, West Germany, to parents Evangelos and Ekaterini, Greek nationals who were working in Germany. He hails from the village of Vyronia, Serres, and has two older siblings, Spiros and Maria. When Melissanidis was 2 years old, his family returned to Thessaloniki, which he considers his hometown.

Melissanidis began training in gymnastics and classical ballet at the age of 9 and a half. His parents were not originally supportive of the idea, and, according to Melissanidis, only relented and took him to the Spartakos Thessaloniki gymnastics club after he refused to eat for two days.

== Gymnastics career ==
At his first Junior European Championships in 1991, Melissanidis placed 18th in the all-around, but earned a bronze medal on the floor exercise, placing ahead of future World Champions Ivan Ivankov and Yordan Yovchev. Two years later, in 1993, he won the floor title at Junior Europeans and placed third on the vault.

In 1994, defended his floor exercise title at the 1994 Junior European Championships in Prague, marking his third time medaling as a junior on this apparatus. 1994 was also his first year competing as a senior, and at age 17, he tied with Great Britain's Neil Thomas for the silver medal on floor at the 1994 World Championships. With this medal, Melissanidis became the first Greek gymnast, male or female, to medal at the World Championships.

Although Melissanidis competed at the 1995 and 1996 World Championships, he did not qualify for an apparatus final. However, at the 1996 Olympics in Atlanta, Melissanidis won the floor exercise gold medal with a score of 9.850. The win marked the first Olympic gymnastics medal for Greece since the 1906 Intercalated Games (and in the official Games since 1896, after 100 years).

Melissanidis continued competing after 1996, winning the vault title at the 1998 European Championships in Saint Petersburg. He represented Greece at the 2000 Summer Olympics in Sydney, but, struggling with injury, competed only on vault and high bar.

== Skills ==
The hallmark of Melissanidis' floor exercises was two specific kinds of combinations: (a) backward saltos out of a whipback and (b) front tuck saltos (with or without a full twist) rebounding forward out of the landing of a backward salto. He often did both types of combinations in the same series, e.g., whip + double layout + rebound front tuck.

Melissanidis has one vault named after him in the Code of Points; the Yurchenko double back in tuck position. In the current Code of Points, his vault carries a D-score (difficulty rating) of 5.2. For some time, the piked version was also credited to him, but it is now credited to Yang Wei, who debuted it in 2002.

== Personal life ==
In 1996, Melissanidis publicly came out as a gay man.

In recent years, Melissanidis has been active in various social and athletic causes. He is a supporter of Greenpeace, and, in 2003, publicly supported the Melina Mercouri Foundation's campaign to return the Parthenon sculptures in the British Museum to Greece. A gymnastics hall in his hometown of Thessaloníki has been named in his honor. He was also one of the torchbearers in the 2004 Summer Olympics Opening Ceremony in Athens.

As of 2008, he was a student at the American Academy of Dramatic Arts in Los Angeles. He was also an invited guest of the 2008 Olympic competition in China and toured Chinese universities as an International Olympic representative.

In 2017, Melissanidis was selected by ANT1 to be a judge on the show So You Think You Can Dance.
