= Alejandro Barrenechea =

Spanish gymnast

- Full name: Alejandro Barrenechea Jayo
- Born: 30 March 1976 (age 50) Bilbao, Spain
- Height: 1.64 m (5 ft 5 in)

Gymnastics career
- Discipline: Men's artistic gymnastics
- Country represented: Spain
- Club: Club Nervión

Alejandro Barrenechea Jayo (Note: In this Spanish name, the first or paternal surname is Barrenechea and the second or maternal family name is Jayo.) (born 30 March 1976) is a Spanish gymnast. He competed at the 2000 Summer Olympics and the 2004 Summer Olympics.
