= Jan-Peter Nikiferow =

German gymnast (born 1971)

- Born: 8 November 1971 (age 54) Magdeburg, East Germany
- Height: 1.63 m (5 ft 4 in)

Gymnastics career
- Discipline: Men's artistic gymnastics
- Country represented: Germany
- Club: Sportclub Berlin
Medal record
Men's artistic gymnastics
Representing Germany
World Championships
Bronze medal – third place	1991 Indianapolis	Team
European Championships
Bronze medal – third place	1998 Saint Petersburg	Team

Jan-Peter Nikiferow (born 8 November 1971) is a German gymnast. He competed at the 1996 Summer Olympics and the 2000 Summer Olympics.
