= Mladen Stefanov =

Bulgarian gymnast (born 1977)

- Младен Стефанов
- Born: 15 September 1977 (age 48) Popovo, Bulgaria

Gymnastics career
- Discipline: Men's artistic gymnastics
- Country represented: Bulgaria

Mladen Stefanov (Bulgarian: Младен Стефанов; born 15 September 1977) is a Bulgarian gymnast. He competed at the 2000 Summer Olympics.
