= Saúl Cofiño =

Spanish gymnast

- Full name: Saúl Cofiño Arena
- Born: 12 July 1978 (age 48) Barcelona, Spain
- Height: 1.73 m (5 ft 8 in)

Gymnastics career
- Discipline: Men's artistic gymnastics
- Country represented: Spain
- Club: Covadonga

Saúl Cofiño Arena (born 12 July 1978) is a Spanish gymnast. He competed at the 2000 Summer Olympics.
