= Cho Seong-min =

South Korean gymnast (born 1976)

- 조성민
- Born: 5 January 1976 (age 50) Jeollabuk-do, South Korea
- Height: 1.61 m (5 ft 3 in)

Gymnastics career
- Discipline: Men's artistic gymnastics
- Country represented: South Korea
- Club: Kyunghee University; Chunbuk Provincial Office
Medal record
Representing South Korea
Asian Games
| Silver medal – second place | 1998 Bangkok | Team |

Korean name
- Hangul: 조성민
- RR: Jo Seongmin
- MR: Cho Sŏngmin

Cho Seong-min (born 5 January 1976) is a South Korean gymnast. He competed at the 1996 Summer Olympics, the 2000 Summer Olympics and the 2004 Summer Olympics.
