= Ruslan Mezentsev =

Ukrainian gymnast (born 1981)

- Руслан Володимирович Мезенцев
- Full name: Ruslan Volodymyrovych Mezentsev
- Born: 24 June 1981 (age 45) Kirovohrad, Ukrainian SSR, Soviet Union
- Height: 1.68 m (5 ft 6 in)

Gymnastics career
- Discipline: Men's artistic gymnastics
- Country represented: Ukraine
- Club: Dynamo Luhansk
Medal record
Men's artistic gymnastics
Representing Ukraine
Olympic Games
Silver medal – second place	2000 Sydney	Team
World Championships
Bronze medal – third place	2001 Ghent	Team
European Championships
Bronze medal – third place	2000 Bremen	Team
European Team Championships
Silver medal – second place	1999 Patras	Team
Summer Universiade
Silver medal – second place	2003 Daegu	Team
World Youth Games
Gold medal – first place	1998 Moscow	Parallel bars
Silver medal – second place	1998 Moscow	Team
Bronze medal – third place	1998 Moscow	Rings

Ruslan Volodymyrovych Mezentsev (also written Myezyentsev; Ukrainian: Руслан Володимирович Мезенцев; born 24 June 1981) is a Ukrainian gymnast. He competed at the 2000 Summer Olympics and the 2004 Summer Olympics, winning a silver medal at the 2000 Olympics.
