= Dimitar Lunchev =

Bulgarian gymnast (born 1977)

- Димитър Лунчев
- Born: 22 June 1977 (age 49) Ruse, Bulgaria

Gymnastics career
- Discipline: Men's artistic gymnastics
- Country represented: Bulgaria

Dimitar Lunchev (Bulgarian: Димитър Лунчев) (born 22 June 1977) is a Bulgarian gymnast. He competed at the 1996 Summer Olympics and the 2000 Summer Olympics.
