= Maxim Aleshin =

Russian gymnast (born 1979)

- Born: 7 May 1979 (age 47) Ulyanovsk, Russia
- Height: 1.66 m (5 ft 5 in)

Gymnastics career
- Discipline: Men's artistic gymnastics
- Country represented: Russia
Medal record
Representing Russia
Olympic Games
Bronze medal – third place	2000 Sydney	Team
World Championships
Silver medal – second place	1999 Tianjin	Team

Maxim Aleshin (Russian: Максим Алёшин; born 7 May 1979 in Ulyanovsk) is a Russian acrobat and former gymnast who won a bronze medal at the 2000 Summer Olympics in Sydney. He toured with the Moscow State Circus in the United Kingdom in 2008.

== See also ==
- List of Olympic male artistic gymnasts for Russia
