= Roman Zozulya (gymnast) =

Ukrainian artistic gymnast (born 1979)

- Full name: Roman Volodymyrovych Zozulya
- Born: 22 June 1979 (age 47) Moscow, Soviet Union
- Height: 164 cm (5 ft 5 in)

Gymnastics career
- Discipline: Men's artistic gymnastics
- Country represented: Ukraine
- Former countries represented: Russia
- Retired: 14 January 2012
Medal record
Representing Ukraine
Olympic Games
Silver medal – second place	2000 Sydney	Team
World Championships
Bronze medal – third place	2001 Ghent	Team
European Championships
Gold medal – first place	2004 Ljubljana	Parallel Bars
European Team Championships
Silver medal – second place	2003 Moscow	Team
Summer Universiade
Silver medal – second place	2003 Daegu	Team
Bronze medal – third place	2003 Daegu	Rings

Roman Volodymyrovych Zozulya (Ukrainian: Роман Володимирович Зозуля; born 22 June 1979) is a retired Ukrainian gymnast who last represented Ukraine at both the 2000 and 2004 Summer Olympics.

== Sports career ==
At the Sydney 2000 Olympic Games, he won the silver medal in the team competition, behind China and ahead of the United States, with his teammates being Valeri Goncharov, Ruslan Mezentsev, Valeri Pereshkura, Olexander Svitlichni and Alexander Beresh.
