= Szilveszter Csollány =

Hungarian gymnast (1970–2022)

- Born: 13 April 1970 Sopron, Hungarian People's Republic
- Died: 24 January 2022 (aged 51) Budapest, Hungary

Gymnastics career
- Discipline: Men's artistic gymnastics
- Country represented: Hungary
Medal record
Men's artistic gymnastics
Representing Hungary
Olympic Games
Gold medal – first place	2000 Sydney	Rings
Silver medal – second place	1996 Atlanta	Rings
World Championships
Gold medal – first place	2002 Debrecen	Rings
Silver medal – second place	1992 Paris	Rings
Silver medal – second place	1996 San Juan	Rings
Silver medal – second place	1997 Lausanne	Rings
Silver medal – second place	1999 Tianjin	Rings
Silver medal – second place	2001 Ghent	Rings
European Championships
Gold medal – first place	1998 Saint Petersburg	Rings
Silver medal – second place	2000 Bremen	Rings
Bronze medal – third place	1990 Lausanne	Rings
Bronze medal – third place	1992 Budapest	Rings
Bronze medal – third place	1994 Prague	Rings
Bronze medal – third place	2002 Patras	Rings

Szilveszter Csollány (Hungarian: [ˈsilvɛstɛr ˈt͡ʃollaːɲ]; 13 April 1970 – 24 January 2022) was a Hungarian gymnast who won gold in the men's rings at the 2000 Summer Olympics in Sydney.

== Gymnatsics career ==
Csollány won gold in the men's rings at the 2000 Summer Olympics in Sydney with a score of 9.85. This achievement earned him the title 2000 Hungarian Sportsman of the Year. He was again chosen as Sportsman of the Year in 2002 after winning a gold medal at that year's World Artistic Gymnastics Championships.

== Post-gymnastics career ==
Csollány moved to Iceland in 2011 and became a gymnastics coach at Grótta.

In November 2021, Csollány contracted an undisclosed variant of SARS-CoV-2. According to his doctor, he was given the Janssen COVID-19 vaccine two weeks before he fell ill. This vaccine requires only one dose. Csollány had previously been critical of vaccination, but finally decided to get vaccinated because of a job abroad. He was hospitalised with COVID-19 in mid-November 2021 and put on a ventilator. His condition became more serious in late November and he was transported from Sopron in Western Hungary to a hospital in the Hungarian capital Budapest.

== Achievements ==
- Olympic Games
  - 6th place 1992 Barcelona men's rings
  - Silver medal 1996 Atlanta men's rings
  - Gold medal 2000 Sydney men's rings
- World Championships
  - Gold medal 2002 Debrecen men's rings
  - Silver medal 1992 Paris, 1996 San Juan, 1997 Lausanne, 1999 Tianjin, 2001 Ghent men's rings
- European Championships
  - Gold medal 1998 men's rings
  - Silver medal 2000 men's rings
  - Bronze medal 1990, 1992, 1994, 2002 men's rings
- Awards and decorations
  - Outstanding Youth Sportsman (1989)
  - Golden Cross of Merit of the Republic of Hungary (1996)
  - Hungarian Gymnast of the Year (1996, 1997, 1998, 1999, 2000, 2001, 2002)
  - Hungarian Sportsman of the Year (2000, 2002)
  - Officer's Cross of the Order of Merit of the Republic of Hungary (2000)
  - Dunaferr Award (2000)
  - Immortal of Hungarian Gymnastics (2009)
  - Hungarian Tolerance Award (2011)

Awards
Preceded by Gábor Balogh	Hungarian Sportsman of the Year; 2000	Succeeded by Gábor Balogh
Preceded by Gábor Balogh	Hungarian Sportsman of the Year; 2002	Succeeded by Adrián Annus
