= Kenichi Fujita =

Japanese gymnast

- 藤田 健一
- Born: 14 April 1975 (age 51) Osaka Prefecture, Japan
- Height: 1.67 m (5 ft 6 in)

Gymnastics career
- Discipline: Men's artistic gymnastics
- Country represented: Japan
- Gym: Tokushukai Gymnastics Club

Kenichi Fujita (藤田健一, Fujita Ken'ichi; born 14 April 1975) is a Japanese gymnast. He finished in 25th place in the all around at the 2000 Summer Olympics.
