= Omar Cortés =

Spanish gymnast

- Full name: Omar Cortés González
- Born: 14 June 1977 (age 49) Madrid, Spain
- Height: 1.66 m (5 ft 5 in)

Gymnastics career
- Discipline: Men's artistic gymnastics
- Country represented: Spain
- Club: Universidad Las Palmas
Medal record
Representing Spain
Mediterranean Games
Silver medal – second place	1997 Bari	Team

Omar Cortés González (born 14 June 1977) is a Spanish former gymnast. He finished 26th in the all around at the 2000 Summer Olympics. He also won a silver medal with the Spanish team at the 1997 Mediterranean Games.
