= Rareș Orzața =

Romanian gymnast

- Full name: Rareș Iulian Orzața
- Born: 16 February 1977 (age 49) Brașov, Socialist Republic of Romania
- Height: 1.70 m (5 ft 7 in)

Gymnastics career
- Discipline: Men's artistic gymnastics
- Country represented: Romania
- Club: CS Dinamo București

Rareș Iulian Orzața (born 16 February 1977) is a Romanian gymnast. He finished eleventh in the all around at the 2000 Summer Olympics.
