= Marius Tobă =

Romanian-born German artistic gymnast

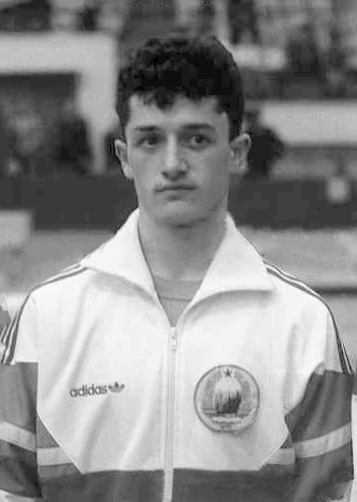
- Tobă in 1988

Personal information
- Full name: Marius Eugen Tobă
- Nickname: Mister Powerman
- Born: 9 January 1968 (age 58) Reșița, Socialist Republic of Romania
- Height: 1.58 m (5 ft 2 in)
- Relatives: Andreas Toba (son)

Gymnastics career
- Discipline: Men's artistic gymnastics
- Country represented: Germany
- Former countries represented: Romania
- Club: SC Reșița; Turn-Klubb zu Hannover 1858
- Head coach: Ioan Albu
Medal record
Men's artistic gymnastics
Representing Germany
European Championships
Silver medal – second place	1996 Broendby	Rings
Bronze medal – third place	1994 Prague	Team

Marius Eugen Tobă (born 9 January 1968) is a retired Romanian-born German artistic gymnast who competed for Romania at the 1988 Olympics and for Germany at the 1996 and 2000 Games. His best individual result in the Olympics or World Championships was sixth place on rings in 2000. At the European Championships, he won two medals for Germany in 1994–1996. He is the 1988 Gold medalist in the All Around at the American Cup.

Tobă never considered himself a brilliant gymnast, but was known for his consistency and reliability. He has a daughter and son, Andreas Toba, from his past marriage, which ended in divorce in 2006. Andreas also took up gymnastics, coached by his father, and competed at the 2012 and 2016 Olympics.

== See also ==
- Nationality changes in gymnastics
