= Éric Poujade =

French gymnast (1972–2024)

Eric Poujade
- Born: 8 August 1972 Aix-en-Provence, Bouches-du-Rhône, France
- Died: 1 July 2024 (aged 51) Marseille, France

Gymnastics career
- Discipline: Men's artistic gymnastics
- Country represented: France
Medal record
Men's artistic gymnastics
Representing France
Olympics
Silver medal – second place	2000 Sydney	Pommel horse
World Championships
Silver medal – second place	1994 Brisbane	Pommel horse
Silver medal – second place	1997 Lausanne	Pommel horse
European Championships
Silver medal – second place	1994 Prague	Pommel horse
Gold medal – first place	1998 Saint Petersburg	Pommel horse
Gold medal – first place	1998 Saint Petersburg	Team
Silver medal – second place	2000 Bremen	Pommel horse

Éric Poujade (8 August 1972 – 1 July 2024) was a French gymnast who competed in the 1996 Summer Olympics and in the 2000 Summer Olympics. Poujade died in Marseille on 1 July 2024, at the age of 51.
