= Flemming Solberg =

Norwegian gymnast

- Full name: Flemming Bjarne Solberg
- Born: 20 August 1973 (age 53) Drammen, Norway
- Height: 1.68 m (5 ft 6 in)

Gymnastics career
- Discipline: Men's artistic gymnastics
- Country represented: Norway
- Gym: Drammens TF

Flemming Bjarne Solberg (born 20 August 1973) is a Norwegian gymnast. He competed at the 1996 Summer Olympics and the 2000 Summer Olympics.
