= Florentin Pescaru =

Romanian gymnast

- Full name: Florentin Dănuț Pescaru
- Born: 25 March 1977 (age 49) Caracal, Socialist Republic of Romania
- Height: 1.70 m (5 ft 7 in)

Gymnastics career
- Discipline: Men's artistic gymnastics
- Country represented: Romania
- Club: CSS Resita

Florentin Dănuț Pescaru (born 24 March 1977) is a Romanian gymnast. He competed at the 2000 Summer Olympics.
