= Norimasa Iwai =

Japanese gymnast

- 岩井 則賢
- Born: 12 March 1973 (age 53) Matsumoto, Nagano, Japan
- Height: 1.57 m (5 ft 2 in)
- Relatives: Jun Iwai (son)

Gymnastics career
- Discipline: Men's artistic gymnastics
- Country represented: Japan

Norimasa Iwai (岩井則賢, Iwai Norimasa; born 12 March 1973) is a Japanese gymnast. He competed at the 2000 Summer Olympics, where he placed seventh in the still rings final.
