= Ilia Giorgadze =

Georgian artistic gymnast (born 1978)

- Born: 12 January 1978 (age 48) Kutaisi, Georgian SSR, Soviet Union
- Height: 168 cm (5 ft 6 in)

Gymnastics career
- Discipline: Men's artistic gymnastics
- Country represented: (Georgia (country)) Georgia

Ilia Giorgadze (born 12 January 1978) is a Georgian artistic gymnast that has represented Georgia at the 1996, 2000, 2004 and 2008 Summer Olympics.
