= Blaine Wilson =

American gymnast (born 1974)

- Wilson in 2026

Personal information
- Full name: Blaine Carew Wilson
- Born: August 3, 1974 (age 52) Columbus, Ohio, U.S.
- Height: 5 ft 4 in (163 cm)
- Spouse: Aliane Baquerot (m. 2008); Makare Desilets (m. 2001, divorced)

Gymnastics career
- Discipline: Men's artistic gymnastics
- Country represented: United States; (1994–2005, 2008)
- College team: Ohio State Buckeyes
- Gym: USOTC; Team Chevron; Team Texaco
- Retired: May 22, 2008
- Awards: Nissen-Emery Award (1997)
Medal record
Men's artistic gymnastics
Representing United States
Event	1st	2nd	3rd
Olympic Games	0	1	0
World Championships	0	1	0
Total	0	2	0
Olympic Games
Silver medal – second place	2004 Athens	Team
World Championships
Silver medal – second place	2003 Anaheim	Team

Blaine Carew Wilson (born August 3, 1974) is a retired American gymnast who was a member of the United States men's national artistic gymnastics team. He is a five-time U.S. national champion (1996-2000), a three-time Olympian (1996, 2000, 2004), and an Olympic silver medalist in the team competition at the 2004 Olympic Games.

== Early life and education ==
Blaine Wilson was born in Columbus, Ohio. He comes from a sports-minded family and is named after baseball great Rod Carew and former Dallas Cowboys guard Blaine Nye. Wilson's father started him in gymnastics at age four because he was so energetic. Wilson competed in college for Ohio State University, where he was coached by 1976 bronze-medal winner Peter Kormann. In 1997, Wilson won the 1997 Big Ten Athlete of the Year award as well as the Nissen Award (the "Heisman" of men's gymnastics).

== Gymnastics career ==
Wilson won his first national all-around title at the 1996 Coca-Cola National Championships and won the next four consecutive national titles. Wilson was the first man to win five consecutive national all-around titles since USA Gymnastics was named the sport's national governing body, and the third man to win five consecutive U.S. all-around titles (or more) in gymnastics history.

Wilson won the silver medal with the U.S. team in the team competition at the 2004 Olympics. He also placed fifth with the U.S. team at the 1996 and 2000 Olympics. At the 1999 World Championships, he placed fourth in the all-around and sixth in the team competition. In 1995, in his first World Championship appearance, he was the highest U.S. all-around finisher (25th).

Wilson won his first World Championship medal at the 2003 World Championships where he helped the U.S. team win the silver medal. Months later, at the 2004 Visa American Cup, Wilson tore his left biceps tendon and vowed to return for the 2004 Olympic Games. His hard work and determination earned him a spot on his third Olympic team. Wilson and the U.S. team went on to win the silver medal in Athens.

On May 22, 2008, during the first night of competition at the Men's USA Championships, Wilson announced his retirement from gymnastics competition.

In 2013, he was inducted into the International Sports Hall of Fame.

== Personal life ==
Wilson married professional volleyball player Makare Desilets on March 28, 2001, whom he met at the United States Olympic Training Center in Colorado Springs, Colorado. They celebrated the birth of their first living child, a daughter, on October 4, 2002, after suffering the loss of a son. Blaine and Makare divorced in 2006. Wilson married rhythmic gymnast Aliane Baquerot. The couple was both performing on The Tour of Gymnastics Superstars and, after their stop in Sacramento, traveled to Reno, Nevada, and married there. Blaine and Aliane have two sons, Jackson and Bodhi.

Blaine currently resides in Columbus, where he owns and manages his own gymnastics, cheerleading, and volleyball training facility, Integrity Athletics, in Plain City, Ohio.
