= Alexei Bondarenko =

Russian gymnast

- Born: August 23, 1978 (age 48) Kostanay, Kazakh SSR, Soviet Union

Gymnastics career
- Discipline: Men's artistic gymnastics
- Country represented: Russia (1996–2008)
- Retired: 2008
Medal record
Olympic Games
Silver medal – second place	2000 Sydney	Vault
Bronze medal – third place	2000 Sydney	Team
World Championships
Silver medal – second place	1997 Lausanne	All-around
Silver medal – second place	1999 Tianjin	Parallel bars
Silver medal – second place	1999 Tianjin	Team
Bronze medal – third place	1997 Lausanne	Team
European Team Championships
Gold medal – first place	1999 Patras	Team
Gold medal – first place	2003 Moscow	Team

Alexei Bondarenko (born August 23, 1978) is a gymnast who competed for Russia from 1996 to 2004. He won two medals at the 2000 Summer Olympics – silver on the vault and bronze in the team event.

== Personal life ==
Bondarenko was born August 23, 1978, in Kostanay, Kazakh SSR, Soviet Union.

== Career ==
Bondarenko started gymnastics in 1987 at age 9. During his career, he was coached by Valery Alfosov at Dynamo Moscow.

=== 1996–2000 ===
Bondarenko made his international debut in the 1996 European Junior Championships at 17 where he won the gold medal in the all-around. The next year, in 1996, he ranked sixth in the all-around in the Russian Championships but he was not selected to compete in the 1996 Olympics. In the 1997 Russian Championships, he ranked second in the all-around and first in the pommel horse, still rings and vault, although Alexei Nemov was not in this competition. He then qualified to the World Championships team where he helped Russia obtain a bronze in the all-around, and where he won a silver in the all-around, and ranked fifth in the vault finals.

In the 1998 Goodwill Games, Bondarenko won another silver in the all-around, and the pommel horse and still rings, and a bronze on floor exercise. The 1998 European Championships in St. Petersburg was a successful competition for Bondarenko where he won the gold in the all-around and on parallel bars, a silver on pommel horse and a bronze on floor exercise, as well as a silver on the team competition.

In the 1999 World Championships, Bondarenko contributed to the silver medal in the team competition for Russia. He won a silver on parallel bars, and was 10th in the all around and 8th on floor exercise.

Bondarenko was fourth in the all-around at the 2000 European Championships leading into the 2000 Olympics and was considered a good contender for several medals in the Olympics. During the 2000 Olympic Games, Bondarenko was part of the silver medal Russian men's team. He was seventh in the all-around and won a silver on vault.

=== 2000–2004 ===
Bondarenko won a silver in the all-around in the 2000 American Cup and the 2000 World Stars in Moscow. He was seventh in the all-around in the 2001 Brisbane Goodwill Games, and won a bronze medal on floor exercise, and was a finalist on pommel horse, still rings, vault and parallel bars. During the World Championships in 2001, however, Bondarenko was 18th in the all-around and did not medal in the other event finals where he qualified, on floor exercise and on the vault. He won the all-around in the 2004 Russian Cup in Moscow leading into the Olympics.

Bondarenko entered the 2004 Olympics with a fledgling Russian men's team that did not have the depth of the 1996 gold medal-winning team. However, he was one of the anchors of the team together with Alexei Nemov. The Russian men's team ranked sixth on the team competition and Bondarenko qualified for the vault finals.

=== Injury at the 2004 Olympics ===
The men's vault finals of the 2004 Olympics was held on August 23, 2004, Bondarenko's 26th birthday. He entered the competition as the reigning Olympic silver medalist and was expected to be a medal contender.

As the first competitor on the vault, Bondarenko fell on his landing after the first vault, a Tsukahara double pike, and was clearly in pain after the attempt. On his second vault, a double front half twist, he landed on his side. Afterwards, he was in severe pain and was seen receiving medical treatment for what appeared to be serious injuries. He was carried off the stadium on a stretcher.

NBC was criticized for not giving any coverage of Bondarenko's injury, and not even broadcasting Bondarenko's vaults. Instead of beginning the broadcast with Bondarenko's attempts, NBC went on to broadcast China's Li Xiaopeng's attempts and then showing the attempts of the three eventual medalists, who were Latvia's Yevgeny Sapronenko (the silver medalist), Spain's Gervasio Deferr (the reigning 2000 Olympic gold medalist and the eventual gold medalist of the competition, and Romania's Marian Drăgulescu (the bronze medalist). It was said that not only did NBC not show the Russian's two falls, viewers were not given any kind of indication that they had happened, and that at no point did the network's gymnastics commentators or studio hosts say that Bondarenko had been injured and taken to the hospital.

Bondarenko's attempts however, were covered in other broadcasts, including the Australian broadcast covered by Simon Reeve and Liz Chetkovich.

=== 2005 to present ===
Bondarenko recovered from his back injury and continued to compete. He was sixth in the Russian Championships on 2005 and was seventh on vault at the DTB World Cup in Stuttgart. He was sixth in the Russian Cup in the same year. At the 2007 Russian Cup, he won silver on vault and gold on high bar. Bondarenko was a member of the 2006 men's team in the World Championships. Bondarenko tried out for the 2008 Olympic team, but, like Yelena Zamolodchikova for the women, did not make the cut at the Olympic trials.

== See also ==
- List of Olympic male artistic gymnasts for Russia

== Sources ==
- Video on YouTube
- "GYMmedia INTERNATIONAL - be a partner of the worldwide leading GYMnastics News Service!". Archived from the original on 2008-05-04.
- Former champion Zamolodchikova misses out
