= Dieter Rehm =

Swiss gymnast

- Born: 29 January 1974 (age 52) Zürich, Switzerland
- Height: 1.64 m (5 ft 5 in)

Gymnastics career
- Discipline: Men's artistic gymnastics
- Country represented: Switzerland
- Gym: Turnverein Samstagern
Medal record
World Championships
| Bronze medal – third place | 1999 Tianjin | Vault |
European Championships
| Silver medal – second place | 1996 Brøndby | Vault |

Dieter "Didi" Rehm (born 29 January 1974) is a Swiss gymnast. He finished in eighth in the vault final and seventh in the horizontal bar final at the 2000 Summer Olympics.
