= Yevgeni Podgorny =

Russian gymnast

- Full name: Yevgeni Anatolyevich Podgorny
- Born: July 9, 1977 (age 49) Novosibirsk, Russia

Gymnastics career
- Discipline: Men's artistic gymnastics
- Country represented: Russia
Medal record
Representing Russia
Artistic Gymnastics
Olympic Games
| Gold medal – first place | 1996 Atlanta | Team |
| Bronze medal – third place | 2000 Sydney | Team |
World Championships
| Silver medal – second place | 1999 Tianjin | Team |
European Team Championships
| Gold medal – first place | 2001 Riesa | Team |

Yevgeni Anatolyevich Podgorny (Russian: Евгений Анатольевич Подгорный; born 9 July 1977 in Novosibirsk) is a former Olympic gymnast who competed for Russia in the two Olympic Games. He won a gold medal in the 1996 and a bronze medal in the 2000 Olympic Games.

== See also ==
- List of Olympic male artistic gymnasts for Russia
