= Yordan Yovchev =

Bulgarian artistic gymnast

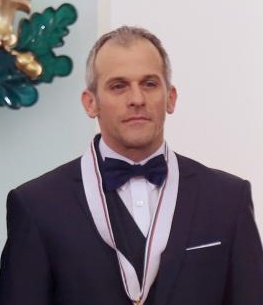

Personal information
- Alternative names: Iordan Iovtchev; Jordan Jovtchev
- Born: 24 February 1973 (age 53) Plovdiv, Bulgaria
- Height: 1.60 m (5 ft 3 in)

Gymnastics career
- Discipline: Men's artistic gymnastics
- Country represented: Bulgaria
- Retired: 2013
Medal record
Representing Bulgaria
Olympic Games
| Silver medal – second place | 2004 Athens | Rings |
| Bronze medal – third place | 2000 Sydney | Floor exercise |
| Bronze medal – third place | 2000 Sydney | Rings |
| Bronze medal – third place | 2004 Athens | Floor exercise |
World Championships
| Gold medal – first place | 2001 Ghent | Floor |
| Gold medal – first place | 2001 Ghent | Rings |
| Gold medal – first place | 2003 Anaheim | Floor |
| Gold medal – first place | 2003 Anaheim | Rings |
| Silver medal – second place | 1996 San Juan | Rings |
| Silver medal – second place | 2002 Debrecen | Floor |
| Silver medal – second place | 2002 Debrecen | Rings |
| Silver medal – second place | 2006 Aarhus | Rings |
| Silver medal – second place | 2009 London | Rings |
| Bronze medal – third place | 1995 Sabae | Rings |
| Bronze medal – third place | 1999 Tianjin | All Around |
| Bronze medal – third place | 2001 Ghent | All Around |
| Bronze medal – third place | 2007 Stuttgart | Rings |
European Championships
| Gold medal – first place | 2002 Patras | Rings |
| Silver medal – second place | 2002 Patras | All Around |
| Silver medal – second place | 2002 Patras | Floor |
| Silver medal – second place | 2004 Ljubljana | Floor |
| Silver medal – second place | 2006 Volos | Rings |
| Silver medal – second place | 2007 Amsterdam | Rings |
| Silver medal – second place | 2008 Lausanne | Rings |
| Bronze medal – third place | 2009 Milan | Rings |
| Bronze medal – third place | 2010 Birmingham | Rings |
European Team Championships
| Silver medal – second place | 1997 Paris | Team |
Goodwill Games
| Gold medal – first place | 2001 Brisbane | Floor |
| Gold medal – first place | 2001 Brisbane | Rings |

Yordan Yovchev Yovchev (Bulgarian: Йордан Йовчев Йовчев; born February 24, 1973), also spelled Jordan Jovtchev, is a retired Bulgarian gymnast. He took part in six consecutive Olympic Games, more than any other Bulgarian athlete in Olympic history. He was named the 2003 Bulgarian Sportsperson of the Year. He was also named the 2003 BTA Best Balkan Athlete of the Year. He is president of the Bulgarian Gymnastics Federation and also serves as a sports commentator.

== Early life and gymnastics career ==
Yovchev was born in Plovdiv, Bulgaria. He won silver in the men's rings at the 2004 Summer Olympics in Athens with a score of 9.850. In the same Olympic Games, Yovchev won bronze in the men's floor exercise with a score of 9.775. In the 2000 Olympics in Sydney, Australia, he won the bronze on both floor exercise and still rings with 9.787 and 9.762, respectively. He also won two World Championship Bronze medals in the all-around (1999, 2001).

Yovchev made his fifth Olympic team for the Beijing Olympics in 2008, and qualified again for the Rings exercise. He qualified second with a score of 16.275 under the new scoring system, but missed a handstand and finished the final in last place with a score of 15.525.

He, Krasimir Dunev, and Ivan Ivankov moved to the United States after the 1996 Summer Olympics, staying in Detroit, Michigan as they wanted to compete professionally in the United States. During his career, he turned down proposals to change his sporting allegiance and compete for the United States.

He coached and trained in Norman, Oklahoma, and Houston, Texas, before moving back to Bulgaria in 2007. He and his wife, Boriana, have a son, Yordan Jr.

In 2009, he was elected president of the Bulgarian Gymnastics Federation.

Yordan Yovchev qualified and participated in the 2012 Summer Olympics in London, which was his 6th appearance at the Olympic Games, a record at that time for a gymnast, along with Oksana Chusovitina who also made her 6th Olympic appearance in 2012 (she now holds the record alone, having competed in her 8th Olympics in 2021). He was also his country's flagbearer during the opening ceremony. Yovchev officially retired from the sport in February 2013.

== Awards and honors ==
In 2016, he was inducted in the International Gymnastics Hall of Fame.

== Personal life ==
He has competed in many SASUKE tournaments, reaching the final stage in the 8th competition; he did not pass the spider climb in the first 15 seconds, so the walls spread apart and he fell. He is the only competitor to not pass the spider climb in this version of the final stage, other than Shingo Yamamoto, who did not complete it due to injury, but his early failure could be attributed to the heavy rain during the entire competition. Since then, he has not passed the third stage.

== Results on SASUKE ==
- 8th competition (59): Failed Spider Climb - Final Stage
- 12th competition (99): Failed Cliff Hanger Kai - Third Stage
- 14th competition (91): Failed Cliff Hanger Kai - Third Stage
- 15th competition (97): Failed Warped Wall - First Stage
- 16th competition (95): Failed Cliff Hanger Kai - Third Stage
- 20th competition (1993)*: Failed Warped Wall - First Stage
- 23rd competition (79): Failed Rope Ladder - First Stage
- *In the 20th competition, the numbering system for the contestants ran from 1901–2000 to indicate that 2000 competitors have attempted SASUKE. Instead of being number 93, Yovchev's number was 1993.

Olympic Games
| Preceded by Petar Stoychev | Flagbearer for Bulgaria; London 2012 | Succeeded by Ivet Lalova-Collio |
