= European Artistic Gymnastics Championships – Men's team all-around =

The European Men's Artistic Gymnastics Championships have been staged since 1955, but the men's team all-around has only been staged since 1994. Russia are the most successful nation with seven titles, Great Britain have four titles, and Romania, Ukraine, with two each, are the only other multiple champions.

== Medalists ==
Year	Location	Gold	Silver	Bronze
1994	(Czech Republic) Prague	Belarus; Vitaly Scherbo; Ivan Ivankov; Andrei Kan; Vitaly Rudnitski; Aleksandr Shostak	Russia; Yevgeny Shabayev; Alexei Nemov; Dmitry Vasilenko; Dmitri Trush	Germany; Valery Belenky; Andreas Wecker; Marius Toba; Ralf Buchner; Maik Krahberg
1996	(Denmark) Copenhagen	Russia; Aleksey Voropayev; Dmitri Karbanenko; Sergey Kharkov; Yevgeni Podgorny; Dmitri Trush	Ukraine; Hrihoriy Misyutin; Oleh Kosiak; Oleksandr Svitlychniy; Rustam Sharipov; Yuriy Yermakov	Belarus; Vitaly Scherbo; Ivan Ivankov; Andrei Kan; Vitaly Rudnitski; Aleksandr Shostak
1998	(Russia) Saint Petersburg	France; Thierry Aymes; Éric Casimir; Samuel Dumont; Dmitri Karbanenko; Éric Poujade	Russia; Alexei Nemov; Alexei Bondarenko; Dmitri Lvov; Maxim Aleshin; Nikolay Kryukov	Germany; Valeri Belenki; Sergei Kharkov; Jan-Peter Nikiferow; Daniel Farago; Dimitrij Nonin
2000	(Germany) Bremen	Russia; Alexei Bondarenko; Alexei Nemov; Evgeni Podgorni; Yuri Tikhonovsky; Maxim Aleshin	Romania; Marian Drăgulescu; Marius Urzică; Dorin Petcu; Ioan Suciu; Rareș Orzața	Ukraine; Alexander Beresch; Alexander Svetlitchni; Roman Zozulya; Valeriy Pereshkura; Ruslan Mezentsev
2002	(Greece) Patras	Romania; Dan Potra; Marian Drăgulescu; Marius Urzică; Ioan Silviu Suciu; Constantin Covaci	Russia; Alexei Bondarenko; Evgueni Podgorni; Alexei Nemov; Nikolai Krukov; Evgeni Krylov	Belarus; Denis Savenkov; Alexander Kruzhylov; Alexei Sinkevich; Dmitri Kaspiarovich; Vitali Valynchuk
2004	(Slovenia) Ljubljana	Romania; Marian Drăgulescu; Ioan Silviu Suciu; Marius Urzică; Razvan Dorin Selariu; Dan Potra	Belarus; Denis Savenkov; Alexander Kruzhylov; Ivan Ivankov; Dimitri Savitski; Alexander Kruzhylov; Alexei Sinkevich	France; Yann Cucherat; Florent Marée; Dimitri Karbanenko; Benoît Caranobe; Pierre-Yves Bény
2006	(Greece) Volos	Russia; Alexander Safoshkin; Sergei Khorokhordin; Maxim Deviatovski; Anatoli Vasiliev; Anton Golotsutskov	Romania; Marian Drăgulescu; Răzvan Șelariu; Ilie Daniel Popescu; Alin Jivan; Flavius Koczi	Belarus; Ivan Ivankov; Dzianiz Savenkov; Dimitri Savitski; Dmitri Kaspiarovich; Viachaslav Volkav
2008	(Switzerland) Lausanne	Russia; Maxim Deviatovski; Sergei Khorokhordin; Nikolai Kryukov; Yury Ryazanov; Anton Golotsutskov	Germany; Fabian Hambuechen; Philipp Boy; Marcel Nguyen; Robert Weber; Robert Juckel	Romania; Flavius Koczi; Ilie Daniel Popescu; Răzvan Șelariu; Robert Stănescu; Cosmin Malita
2010	(United Kingdom) Birmingham	Germany; Philipp Boy; Matthias Fahrig; Fabian Hambüchen; Marcel Nguyen; Evgenij Spiridonov	Great Britain; Daniel Keatings; Louis Smith; Samuel Hunter; Daniel Purvis; Kristian Thomas	France; Hamilton Sabot; Cyril Tommasone; Samir Aït Saïd; Yannick Rayepin Moutoussamy; Yann Cucherat
2012	(France) Montpellier	Great Britain; Ruslan Panteleymonov; Louis Smith; Daniel Purvis; Kristian Thomas; Max Whitlock	Russia; Denis Ablyazin; Emin Garibov; David Belyavskiy; Anton Golotsutskov; Aleksandr Balandin	Romania; Flavius Koczi; Marius Berbecar; Ovidiu Buidoso; Vlad Bogdan Cotuna; Cristian Ioan Bataga
2014	(Bulgaria) Sofia	Russia; Denis Ablyazin; Nikolai Kuksenkov; Nikita Ignatyev; Aleksandr Balandin; David Belyavskiy	Great Britain; Daniel Purvis; Daniel Keatings; Sam Oldham; Kristian Thomas; Max Whitlock	Ukraine; Oleg Verniaiev; Igor Radivilov; Maksym Semiankiv; Andrii Sienichkin; Volodymyr Okachev
2016	(Switzerland) Bern	Russia; Denis Ablyazin; David Belyavskiy; Nikita Ignatyev; Nikolai Kuksenkov; Nikita Nagornyy	Great Britain; Daniel Purvis; Louis Smith; Kristian Thomas; Courtney Tulloch; Nile Wilson	Switzerland; Christian Baumann; Pablo Brägger; Benjamin Gischard; Oliver Hegi; Eddy Yusof
2018	(Scotland) Glasgow	Russia; David Belyavskiy; Artur Dalaloyan; Nikolai Kuksenkov; Dmitriy Lankin; Nikita Nagornyy	Great Britain; Joe Fraser; James Hall; Max Whitlock; Courtney Tulloch; Dominick Cunningham	France; Cyril Tommasone; Julien Gobaux; Axel Augis; Loris Frasca; Edgar Boulet
2020	(Turkey) Mersin	Ukraine; Vladyslav Hryko; Petro Pakhniuk; Igor Radivilov; Roman Vashchenko; Yevhen Yudenkov	Turkey; Ferhat Arıcan; İbrahim Çolak; Abdelrahman Elgamal; Ahmet Önder; Ümit Şamiloğlu	Hungary; Szabolcs Bátori; Balázs Kiss; Krisztofer Mészáros; Benedek Tomcsányi; Dávid Vecsernyés
2022	(Germany) Munich	Great Britain; Joe Fraser; Giarnni Regini-Moran; Jake Jarman; James Hall; Courtney Tulloch	Italy; Nicola Bartolini; Matteo Levantesi; Lorenzo Minh Casali; Yumin Abbadini; Andrea Cingolani	Turkey; Ferhat Arıcan; Ahmet Önder; Kerem Sener; Adem Asil; Mehmet Ayberk Kosak
2023	(Turkey) Antalya	Italy; Yumin Abbadini; Lorenzo Minh Casali; Matteo Levantesi; Marco Lodadio; Mario Macchiati	Turkey; Ferhat Arıcan; Adem Asil; Mehmet Koşak; Ahmet Önder; Kerem Şener	Great Britain; Jake Jarman; Joshua Nathan; Adam Tobin; Courtney Tulloch; Luke Whitehouse
2024	(Italy) Rimini	Ukraine; Nazar Chepurnyi; Illia Kovtun; Igor Radivilov; Radomyr Stelmakh; Oleg Verniaiev	Great Britain; Joe Fraser; James Hall; Harry Hepworth; Jake Jarman; Courtney Tulloch	Italy; Yumin Abbadini; Lorenzo Minh Casali; Matteo Levantesi; Marco Lodadio; Mario Macchiati
2025	(Germany) Leipzig	Great Britain; Harry Hepworth; Jake Jarman; Jamie Lewis; Jonas Rushworth; Luke Whitehouse	Switzerland; Luca Giubellini; Matteo Giubellini; Florian Langenegger; Ian Raubal; Noe Seifert	Italy; Yumin Abbadini; Nicola Bartolini; Lorenzo Minh Casali; Edoardo de Rosa; Mario Macchiati
2026	(Croatia) Zagreb	(United Kingdom) Great Britain; Joe Fraser; Harry Hepworth; Sol Scott; Jonas Rushworth; Courtney Tulloch	Arsenii Dukhno; Mukhammadzhon Iakubov; Daniel Marinov; Savelii Sieedin; Ilia Zaika	Switzerland; Matteo Giubellini; Florian Langenegger; Mattia Piffaretti; Noe Seifert; Dominic Tamsel

== Medal table ==
Rank	Nation	Gold	Silver	Bronze	Total
1	Russia (RUS)	7	4	0	11
2	Great Britain (GBR)	4	5	1	10
3	Romania (ROU)	2	2	2	6
4	Ukraine (UKR)	2	1	2	5
5	Belarus (BLR)	1	1	3	5
6	Germany (GER)	1	1	2	4
6	Italy (ITA)	1	1	2	4
8	France (FRA)	1	0	3	4
9	Turkey (TUR)	0	2	1	3
10	Switzerland (SUI)	0	1	2	3
–	World Gymnastics 2	0	1	0	1
11	Hungary (HUN)	0	0	1	1
Totals (11 entries)		19	19	19	57

Notes

- Does not include medals won in 2026 by World Gymnastics 2, the designation under which Russian gymnasts were allowed to compete at those championships.
