= Gymnastics at the 2008 Summer Olympics – Men's artistic individual all-around =

Olympic gymnastics event

Men's artistic individual all-around at the Games of the XXIX Olympiad
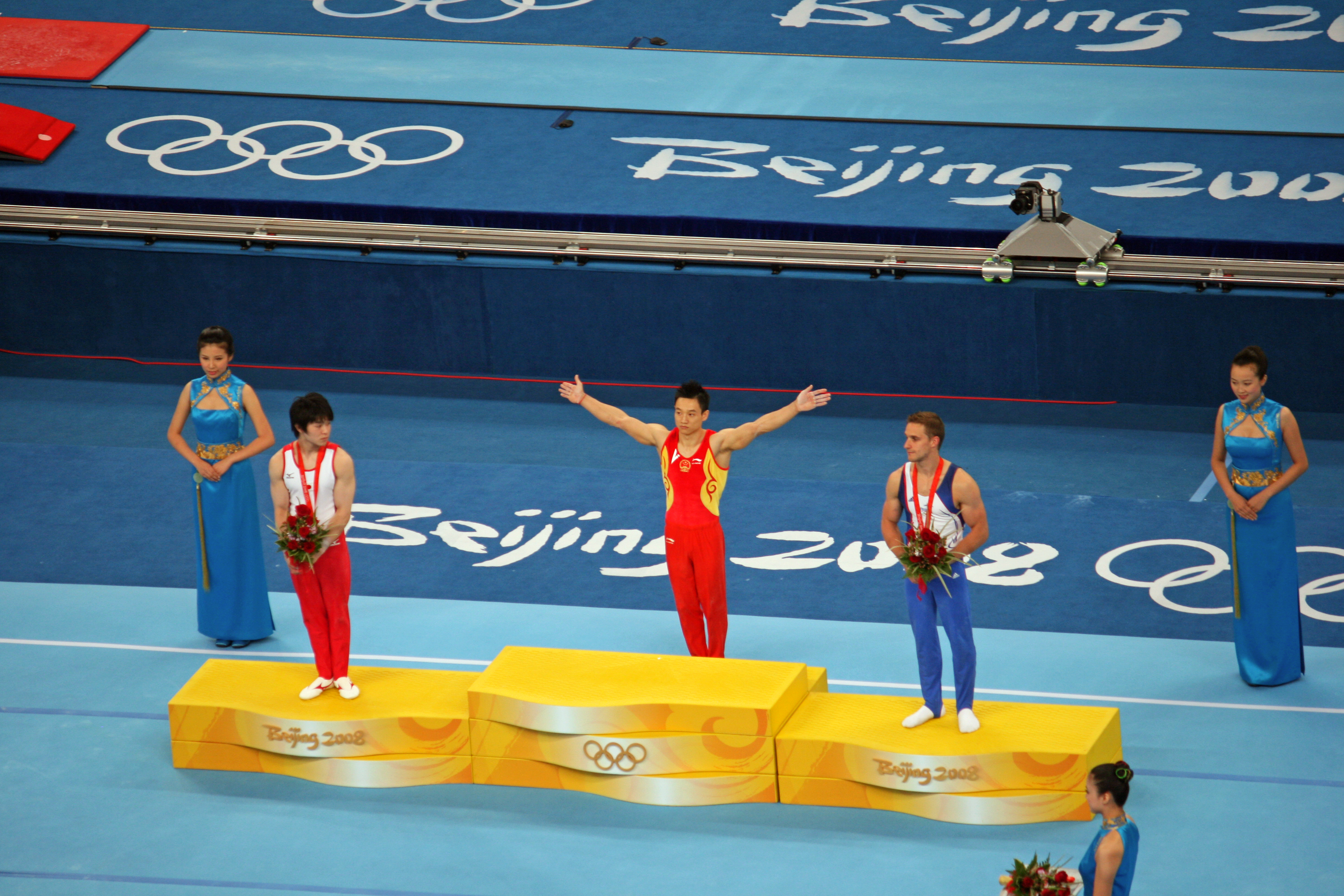
- Medal ceremony
- Venue: Beijing National Indoor Stadium
- Dates: 9–14 August
- Competitors: 98 from 35 nations
- Winning score: 94.575

Medalists
1st place, gold medalist(s)		Yang Wei; China
2nd place, silver medalist(s)		Kōhei Uchimura; Japan
3rd place, bronze medalist(s)		Benoît Caranobe; France

The men's artistic individual all-around competition at the 2008 Summer Olympics was held at the Beijing National Indoor Stadium on August 9 and 14. There were 98 competitors from 35 nations. The event was won by Yang Wei of China, the nation's first victory in the event since 1996 and second overall. Yang, who had earned silver in 2000, was the 13th man to receive multiple medals in the individual all-around (and the first to do so in non-consecutive Games). Japan's Kōhei Uchimura took silver; it was the first medal in the event for Japan since 1984, the last of a four-decade stretch where the nation reached the podium every time it competed (7 of 8 Games from 1956 to 1984, with Japan boycotting the 1980 Games). Benoît Caranobe of France took bronze, the first men's all-around medal for that nation since 1920.

== Background ==
This was the 25th appearance of the men's individual all-around. The first individual all-around competition had been held in 1900, after the 1896 competitions featured only individual apparatus events. A men's individual all-around has been held every Games since 1900.

Six of the top 10 gymnasts from the 2004 Games returned: silver medalist Kim Dae-Eun and bronze medalist Yang Tae Young of South Korea, fifth-place finisher Rafael Martínez of Spain, sixth-place finisher Hiroyuki Tomita of Japan, seventh-place finisher (and 2000 silver medalist) Yang Wei of China, and eighth-place finisher Marian Drăgulescu of Romania. Tomita had won the World Championship in 2005; Yang Wei had won the next two in 2006 and 2007 (the first repeat champion since the 1920s) and was the heavy favorite coming into the Games.

Uzbekistan, Venezuela, and Yemen each made their debut in the event. France made its 23rd appearance, most among nations.

== Qualification ==
Qualification for the men's artistic gymnastics in 2008 was based entirely on the 2007 World Artistic Gymnastics Championships. The top 12 teams at the world championships could send a full team of 6 gymnasts to the Olympics. The next 3 teams (#13 through #15) could send 2 gymnasts. The 3 teams after that (#16 through #18) could send 1 gymnast. The next 7 individual gymnasts (only from nations without any qualified gymnasts yet) and apparatus gold medal winners also qualified. The FIG Executive Board made invitational selections to ensure host country and continental representation and the Tripartite Commission made an invitation. The quota of 98 gymnasts was then filled through additional individual gymnasts.

== Competition format ==
In the third straight Games with a significant format change, the Code of Points was implemented. Rather than exercise scores being scored on a 0 to 10 scale (the "perfect 10" system), scoring was now based on two separate scores that were then combined in order to come to the final score. The A score measured the difficulty of each element (and combinations of elements) within the routine, while the B score evaluated the performance, ie, the "execution, composition and artistry" of the routine. There was no longer a theoretical top score.

The rest of the format remained the same as before. There was a preliminary round and a final. All gymnasts were ranked based on the sum of their exercise scores for all six apparatus, which gave an all-around qualification score. (Gymnasts that did not compete on every apparatus, of course, having significantly lower scores than those who did.) The top 24 competitors moved on to the individual all-around final, though nations were limited to two competitors each even if more qualified.

In the individual all-around final, each gymnast competed on each apparatus again. Only scores from the final were used to determine final rankings.

== Schedule ==
All times are China Standard Time (UTC+8)

Date	Time	Round
Saturday, 9 August 2008	12:00	Qualifying
Thursday, 14 August 2008	11:00	Final

== Results ==
The twenty-four competitors with the highest scores in qualifying proceed to the men's artistic individual all-around finals.

Rank	Gymnast	Nation	Prelim	Floor (gymnastics)	Pommel horse	Rings (gymnastics)	Vault (gymnastics)	Parallel bars	Horizontal bar	Total
1st place, gold medalist(s)	Yang Wei	China	93.875	15.250	15.275	16.625	16.550	16.100	14.775	94.575
2nd place, silver medalist(s)	Kohei Uchimura	Japan	92.050	15.825	13.275	15.200	16.300	15.975	15.400	91.975
3rd place, bronze medalist(s)	Benoit Caranobe	France	90.925	15.350	14.875	15.175	16.600	15.050	14.875	91.925
4	Hiroyuki Tomita	Japan	91.900	15.100	15.425	13.850	16.200	16.000	15.675	91.750
5	Sergey Khorokhordin	Russia	91.800	15.150	15.100	15.400	15.300	15.700	15.050	91.700
6	Maxim Devyatovskiy	Russia	90.350	15.225	15.200	15.625	15.225	15.325	15.100	91.700
7	Fabian Hambüchen	Germany	92.425	15.625	14.375	15.025	15.975	15.275	15.400	91.675
8	Yang Tae-young	South Korea	89.300	15.225	14.300	14.900	16.075	16.350	14.750	91.600
9	Jonathan Horton	United States	91.650	15.600	13.675	15.575	16.100	15.275	15.350	91.575
10	Rafael Martínez	Spain	90.800	15.450	15.000	14.375	15.575	15.525	15.575	91.500
11	Kim Dae-eun	South Korea	92.400	15.225	13.650	15.400	15.625	16.000	14.875	90.775
12	Alexander Artemev	United States	89.725	14.625	15.525	14.275	15.975	15.200	15.075	90.675
13	Philipp Boy	Germany	89.475	15.075	14.875	14.825	15.400	15.050	15.450	90.675
14	Luis Rivera Rivera	Puerto Rico	90.600	15.250	15.025	15.225	16.025	14.375	14.275	90.175
15	Adam Wong	Canada	89.125	14.325	14.550	15.050	15.700	15.350	14.825	89.800
16	Anton Fokin	Uzbekistan	89.275	14.525	15.150	14.700	15.575	16.125	13.675	89.750
17	Nathan Gafuik	Canada	89.725	15.325	13.475	14.375	16.175	15.275	15.000	89.625
18	Flavius Koczi	Romania	90.175	14.900	15.425	14.550	16.450	13.525	14.725	89.575
19	Enrico Pozzo	Italy	88.675	15.250	14.625	13.850	15.600	14.600	15.450	89.375
20	Daniel Keatings	Great Britain	88.950	14.850	15.700	14.000	15.800	14.425	14.225	89.000
21	Thomas Bouhail	France	88.550	15.200	13.400	13.650	15.850	14.425	14.475	87.000
22	José Luis Fuentes	Venezuela	90.325	14.175	13.650	13.900	15.250	15.175	14.150	86.300
23	Dmitry Savitski	Belarus	90.650	13.725	13.750	15.300	15.900	13.400	10.100	82.175
24	Chen Yibing	China	91.600	—	13.750	16.650	15.900	14.950	12.975	74.225
25	Koki Sakamoto	Japan	91.950	Did not advance—2 per nation rule						
26	Yuri Ryazanov	Russia	90.125	Did not advance—2 per nation rule						
27	Kim Su-myeon	South Korea	89.900	Did not advance—2 per nation rule						
28	Dimitri Karbanenko	France	88.500	Did not advance						
29	Aleksandr Shatilov	Israel	87.800	Did not advance						
30	Hamilton Sabot	France	87.750	Did not advance						
31	Matteo Morandi	Italy	87.575	Did not advance						
32	Daniel Popescu	Romania	87.300	Did not advance						
33	Denis Savenkov	Belarus	87.025	Did not advance						
34	Kim Seung-il	South Korea	87.000	Did not advance						
35	Claudio Capelli	Switzerland	86.550	Did not advance						
36	Adrian Bucur	Romania	86.475	Did not advance						
37	Sascha Palgen	Luxembourg	86.075	Did not advance						
38	Răzvan Şelariu	Romania	85.975	Did not advance						
39	Sam Simpson	Australia	85.625	Did not advance						
40	Sergio Muñoz	Spain	85.500	Did not advance						
41	Louis Smith	Great Britain	85.325	Did not advance						
42	Jorge Hugo Giraldo	Colombia	84.650	Did not advance						
43	Koen Van Damme	Belgium	84.625	Did not advance						
44	Mohamed Srour	Egypt	81.200	Did not advance						
45	Li Xiaopeng	China	78.500	Did not advance						
46	Xiao Qin	China	76.700	Did not advance						
47	Dmitry Kasperovich	Belarus	76.225	Did not advance						
48	Takuya Nakase	Japan	76.025	Did not advance						
49	Marcel Nguyen	Germany	75.825	Did not advance						
50	Joey Hagerty	United States	75.650	Did not advance						
51	Justin Spring	United States	75.650	Did not advance						
52	Raj Bhavsar	United States	75.350	Did not advance						
53	Eugen Spiridonov	Germany	75.000	Did not advance						
54	David Kikuchi	Canada	74.300	Did not advance						
55	Iván San Miguel	Spain	73.925	Did not advance						
56	Robert Juckel	Germany	73.925	Did not advance						
57	Anton Golotsutskov	Russia	73.850	Did not advance						
58	Manuel Carballo	Spain	72.325	Did not advance						
59	Andrea Coppolino	Italy	71.425	Did not advance						
60	Nikolay Kryukov	Russia	62.275	Did not advance						
61	Takehiro Kashima	Japan	61.100	Did not advance						
62	Kim Ji-hun	South Korea	60.325	Did not advance						
63	Kyle Shewfelt	Canada	60.050	Did not advance						
64	Matteo Angioletti	Italy	59.950	Did not advance						
65	Grant Golding	Canada	59.700	Did not advance						
66	Isaac Botella	Spain	59.525	Did not advance						
67	Gervasio Deferr	Spain	59.225	Did not advance						
68	Aleksandr Tsarevich	Belarus	58.775	Did not advance						
69	Alberto Busnari	Italy	57.650	Did not advance						
70	Igor Kozlov	Belarus	56.900	Did not advance						
71	Marian Drăgulescu	Romania	47.350	Did not advance						
72	Zou Kai	China	47.000	Did not advance						
73	Huang Xu	China	46.675	Did not advance						
74	Brandon O'Neill	Canada	45.975	Did not advance						
75	Thomas Andergassen	Germany	45.100	Did not advance						
76	Kevin Tan	United States	44.250	Did not advance						
77	Igor Cassina	Italy	43.925	Did not advance						
78	George Stănescu	Romania	43.875	Did not advance						
79	Konstantin Pluzhnikov	Russia	43.675	Did not advance						
80	Danny Rodrigues	France	43.400	Did not advance						
81	Nashwan Al-Harazi	Yemen	41.175	Did not advance						
82	Róbert Gál	Hungary	39.550	Did not advance						
83	Diego Hypólito	Brazil	32.050	Did not advance						
84	Yann Cucherat	France	31.850	Did not advance						
85	Yoo Won-chul	South Korea	31.725	Did not advance						
86	Makoto Okiguchi	Japan	31.025	Did not advance						
87	Filip Ude	Croatia	30.250	Did not advance						
88	Vlasis Maras	Greece	29.900	Did not advance						
89	Valeriy Honcharov	Ukraine	29.850	Did not advance						
90	Ilia Giorgadze	Georgia	29.775	Did not advance						
91	Christoph Schärer	Switzerland	28.500	Did not advance						
92	Aleksey Ignatovich	Belarus	28.075	Did not advance						
93	Martin Konečný	Czech Republic	26.775	Did not advance						
94	Leszek Blanik	Poland	16.700	Did not advance						
95	Yordan Yovchev	Bulgaria	16.275	Did not advance						
96	Oleksandr Vorobiov	Ukraine	16.250	Did not advance						
97	Mitja Petkovšek	Slovenia	16.125	Did not advance						
98	Epke Zonderland	Netherlands	15.750	Did not advance						
