= 2002 European Men's Artistic Gymnastics Championships =

25th European Men's Artistic Gymnastics Championships
- Venue: Dimitris Tofalos Arena
- Location: Patras, Greece
- Start date: 18 April 2002
- End date: 21 April 2002

The 25th European Men's Artistic Gymnastics Championships were held in Patras, Greece from 18 to 21 April 2002. This event was for male gymnasts in senior and junior levels.

== Medalists ==
Event	Gold	Silver	Bronze
Senior men
Team	Romania (ROU); Dan Potra; Marian Drăgulescu; Marius Urzică; Ioan Silviu Suciu; Constantin Covaci	Russia (RUS); Alexei Bondarenko; Evgueni Podgorni; Alexei Nemov; Nikolai Krukov; Evgeni Krylov	Belarus (BLR); Denis Savenkov; Alexander Kruzhylov; Alexei Sinkevich; Dmitri Kaspiarovich; Vitali Valynchuk
All-around	Dan Potra (ROU)	Yordan Yovchev (BUL)	Alexei Bondarenko (RUS)
Floor	Alexei Nemov (RUS)	Yordan Yovchev (BUL)	Marian Drăgulescu (ROU)
Pommel horse	Marius Urzică (ROU)	Ioan Silviu Suciu (ROU)	Alberto Busnari (ITA)
Rings	Yordan Yovchev (BUL)	Dimosthenis Tampakos (GRE)	Szilveszter Csollány (HUN)
Vault	Dmitry Kasperovich (BLR); Marian Drăgulescu (ROU)	none awarded	Kanukai Jackson (GBR)
Parallel bars	Vasileios Tsolakidis (GRE)	Mitja Petkovšek (SLO)	Alexei Sinkevich (BLR)
Horizontal bar	Vlasios Maras (GRE)	Florent Marée (FRA)	Igor Cassina (ITA)
Junior men
Team	Russia (RUS)	Switzerland (SUI)	Germany (GER)
All-around	Maxim Deviatovski (RUS)	Anton Golotsutskov (RUS)	Rene Piephardt (GER)
Floor	Adrian Ionescu (ROU)	Georgios Tsiopoulos (GRE)	Patrick Dominguez (SUI)
Pommel horse	Aliaksei Ihnatovich (BLR)	Krisztián Berki (HUN)	Luca Forte (ITA)
Rings	Mark Freeman (GBR)	Anton Golotsutskov (RUS)	Ciprian Veres (ROU)
Vault	Georgios Tsiopoulos (GRE)	Martin Konecny (CZE)	Jeffrey Wammes (NED)
Parallel bars	Fabian Hambüchen (GER)	Raphael Wignanitz (FRA)	Waldemar Eichhorn (GER)
Horizontal bar	Martin Konecny (CZE)	Waldemar Eichhorn (GER)	Mario Volta (ITA)

=== Medal table ===
==== Combined ====
Rank	Nation	Gold	Silver	Bronze	Total
1	Romania (ROU)	4	2	2	8
2	Russia (RUS)	3	3	1	7
3	Greece (GRE)	3	2	0	5
4	Belarus (BLR)	2	0	2	4
5	Bulgaria (BUL)	1	2	0	3
6	Germany (GER)	1	1	3	5
7	Czech Republic (CZE)	1	1	0	2
8	Great Britain (GBR)	1	0	1	2
9	France (FRA)	0	2	0	2
10	Hungary (HUN)	0	1	1	2
10	Switzerland (SUI)	0	1	1	2
12	Slovenia (SLO)	0	1	0	1
13	Italy (ITA)	0	0	4	4
14	Netherlands (NED)	0	0	1	1
Totals (14 entries)		16	16	16	48

==== Seniors ====
Rank	Nation	Gold	Silver	Bronze	Total
1	Romania (ROU)	3	2	1	6
2	Greece (GRE)	2	1	0	3
3	Bulgaria (BUL)	1	2	0	3
4	Russia (RUS)	1	1	1	3
5	Belarus (BLR)	1	0	2	3
6	France (FRA)	0	1	0	1
6	Slovenia (SLO)	0	1	0	1
8	Italy (ITA)	0	0	2	2
9	Great Britain (GBR)	0	0	1	1
9	Hungary (HUN)	0	0	1	1
Totals (10 entries)		8	8	8	24

==== Juniors ====
Rank	Nation	Gold	Silver	Bronze	Total
1	Russia (RUS)	2	2	0	4
2	Germany (GER)	1	1	3	5
3	Czech Republic (CZE)	1	1	0	2
3	Greece (GRE)	1	1	0	2
5	Romania (ROU)	1	0	1	2
6	Belarus (BLR)	1	0	0	1
6	Great Britain (GBR)	1	0	0	1
8	Switzerland (SUI)	0	1	1	2
9	France (FRA)	0	1	0	1
9	Hungary (HUN)	0	1	0	1
11	Italy (ITA)	0	0	2	2
12	Netherlands (NED)	0	0	1	1
Totals (12 entries)		8	8	8	24

== Senior results ==
Full results of the men's senior competition.

=== Team ===
Rank	Athlete	Apparatus						Total
Rank	Athlete	F	PH	R	V	PB	HB	Total
1st place, gold medalist(s)	Romania (ROU)	27.999	28.812	28.124	28.674	27.824	26.737	168.170
2nd place, silver medalist(s)	Russia (RUS)	28.212	27.037	27.950	28.537	27.975	27.387	167.098
3rd place, bronze medalist(s)	Belarus (BLR)	27.900	28.062	27.511	28.349	27.936	26.824	166.582
4	France (FRA)	27.437	27.187	27.849	27.912	28.175	27.950	166.510
5	Germany (GER)	27.586	27.311	27.511	28.061	26.962	27.794	165.405
6	Ukraine (UKR)	26.787	27.637	26.837	28.312	26.312	27.774	163.659
7	Spain (ESP)	27.112	28.511	26.462	27.999	26.499	26.562	163.145
8	Italy (ITA)	27.012	27.250	27.624	27.337	25.299	28.012	162.534
9	Switzerland (SUI)	26.687	27.799	27.437	28.074	26.262	26.224	162.483
10	Greece (GRE)	25.737	27.249	26.537	27.949	27.137	26.962	161.571
11	Latvia (LAT)	27.137	26.912	27.599	27.925	25.699	25.500	160.772
12	Hungary (HUN)	26.824	27.249	27.661	27.036	25.849	24.824	159.443
13	Bulgaria (BUL)	26.850	24.375	27.649	27.924	26.200	25.011	158.009
14	Great Britain (GBR)	25.687	25.387	24.987	28.636	25.912	25.287	155.896
15	Czech Republic (CZE)	26.125	25.025	24.899	26.811	26.149	25.600	154.609
16	Portugal (POR)	26.000	24.800	24.250	26.812	25.387	25.574	152.823
17	Sweden (SWE)	26.287	24.350	24.837	26.962	24.700	24.775	151.911
18	Armenia (ARM)	26.600	24.675	24.249	26.137	24.512	23.975	150.148
19	Finland (FIN)	25.874	22.400	25.475	26.536	25.012	24.425	149.722
20	Austria (AUT)	25.162	25.000	24.249	26.687	23.912	24.637	149.637
21	Netherlands (NED)	25.462	23.850	25.424	26.887	23.875	23.949	149.447
22	Turkey (TUR)	25.974	24.350	24.187	26.674	24.512	23.012	148.709
23	Belgium (BEL)	25.274	24.537	24.412	26.949	23.487	23.899	148.558
24	Denmark (DEN)	25.861	20.750	24.387	27.174	23.824	25.412	147.408
25	Slovakia (SVK)	24.024	23.475	25.749	26.012	24.312	22.175	145.747
26	Israel (ISR)	23.525	23.187	24.737	23.937	23.862	23.737	142.985
27	Cyprus (CYP)	23.424	18.200	26.912	26.499	21.125	22.087	138.247

=== All-around ===
Rank	Athlete	Nation	Apparatus						Total
Rank	Athlete	Nation	F	PH	R	V	PB	HB	Total
1st place, gold medalist(s)	Dan Potra	Romania (ROU)	8.787	9.400	9.512	9.337	9.262	9.412	55.710
2nd place, silver medalist(s)	Yordan Yovchev	Bulgaria (BUL)	9.700	8.875	9.712	9.337	9.187	8.812	55.623
3rd place, bronze medalist(s)	Alexei Bondarenko	Russia (RUS)	9.600	8.775	9.225	9.512	9.150	9.350	55.612
4	Evgueni Podgorni	Russia (RUS)	9.375	9.050	9.212	8.975	9.287	9.462	55.361
5	Erik Revelinsh	Latvia (LAT)	9.150	9.462	9.512	9.312	8.675	8.950	55.061
6	Vlasios Maras	Greece (GRE)	9.100	8.887	8.250	9.487	8.975	9.700	54.399
7	Víctor Cano	Spain (ESP)	9.150	9.450	9.100	9.250	8.387	8.237	53.574
8	Runar Alexandersson	Iceland (ISL)	8.425	9.625	8.912	8.862	8.675	8.625	53.124
9	Vahag Stepanyan	Armenia (ARM)	8.612	9.275	8.650	8.987	8.862	8.437	52.823
10	Manuel Campos	Portugal (POR)	9.175	8.350	8.337	9.000	8.437	9.275	52.574
11	Sven Kwiatkowski	Germany (GER)	7.950	9.350	8.900	9.300	8.662	8.262	52.424
12	Alexander Tvauri	Georgia (GEO)	8.412	8.112	9.525	9.100	8.587	8.587	52.323
13	Rasmus Brandtoft	Denmark (DEN)	8.725	8.587	8.325	9.100	8.275	9.062	52.074
14	Kanukai Jackson	Great Britain (GBR)	8.400	8.587	8.600	9.487	8.237	8.537	51.848
15	Martin Vlk	Czech Republic (CZE)	8.737	8.537	8.325	8.962	8.300	8.612	51.473
16	Daniel Rexa	Czech Republic (CZE)	8.050	9.175	8.112	8.837	8.700	8.350	51.224
17	Eduard Gholub	Israel (ISR)	8.475	8.212	8.750	9.025	8.312	8.412	51.186
18	Anders Pettersson	Sweden (SWE)	8.337	8.200	8.412	9.075	8.500	8.387	50.911
19	Michael Hjorth	Sweden (SWE)	8.600	8.862	8.300	8.937	7.550	7.825	50.074
20	Filipe Bezugo	Portugal (POR)	8.950	8.037	8.400	8.937	8.012	7.400	49.736
21	Ümit Şamiloğlu	Turkey (TUR)	9.012	6.500	7.900	8.712	8.437	8.550	49.111
22	Sami Aalto	Finland (FIN)	7.950	7.100	8.550	8.912	8.037	8.237	48.786
-	Roman Zozulia	Ukraine (UKR)	Withdrew due to medical reasons						

=== Floor ===
Rank	Gymnast	Total
1st place, gold medalist(s)	Alexei Nemov (RUS)	9.825
2nd place, silver medalist(s)	Yordan Yovchev (BUL)	9.762
3rd place, bronze medalist(s)	Marian Drăgulescu (ROU)	9.687
4	Denis Savenkov (BLR)	9.500
5	Alexander Kruzhylov (BLR)	9.412
6	Alejandro Barrenechea (ESP)	9.200
7	Róbert Gál (HUN)	9.100
8	Dan Potra (ROU)	8.637

=== Pommel horse ===
Rank	Gymnast	Total
1st place, gold medalist(s)	Marius Urzică (ROU)	9.812
2nd place, silver medalist(s)	Ioan Silviu Suciu (ROU)	9.662
3rd place, bronze medalist(s)	Alberto Busnari (ITA)	9.637
4	Víctor Cano (ESP)	9.562
5	Denis Savenkov (BLR)	9.375
6	Nikolai Krukov (RUS)	9.087
7	Vlasios Maras (GRE)	8.875
8	Runar Alexandersson (ISL)	8.175

=== Rings ===
Rank	Gymnast	Total
1st place, gold medalist(s)	Yordan Yovchev (BUL)	9.750
2nd place, silver medalist(s)	Dimosthenis Tampakos (GRE)	9.737
3rd place, bronze medalist(s)	Szilveszter Csollany (HUN)	9.725
4	Andrea Coppolino (ITA)	9.712
5	Sergei Vialtsev (UKR)	9.650
6	Herodotos Giorgallas (CYP)	9.625
7	Evgueni Krylov (RUS)	9.462
8	Dan Potra (ROU)	9.275

=== Vault ===
Rank	Gymnast	Total
1st place, gold medalist(s)	Dimitri Kasparovich (BLR)	9.656
1st place, gold medalist(s)	Marian Drăgulescu (ROU)	9.656
3rd place, bronze medalist(s)	Kanukai Jackson (GBR)	9.581
4	Ioan Silviu Suciu (ROU)	9.499
5	Leszek Blanik (POL)	9.412
5	Alexei Bondarenko (RUS)	9.412
7	Gerrard Darren (GBR)	9.143
8	Evgeni Sapronenko (LAT)	9.125

=== Parallel bars ===
Rank	Gymnast	Total
1st place, gold medalist(s)	Vasileios Tsolakidis (GRE)	9.837
2nd place, silver medalist(s)	Mitja Petkovšek (SLO)	9.750
3rd place, bronze medalist(s)	Alexei Sinkevich (BLR)	9.637
4	Alexei Nemov (RUS)	9.612
5	Yann Cucherat (FRA)	9.425
6	Andreu Vivó (ESP)	9.375
7	Marius Urzică (ROU)	9.337
8	Florent Marée (FRA)	9.250

=== Horizontal bars ===
Rank	Gymnast	Total
1st place, gold medalist(s)	Vlasios Maras (GRE)	9.812
2nd place, silver medalist(s)	Florent Marée (FRA)	9.712
3rd place, bronze medalist(s)	Igor Cassina (ITA)	9.687
4	Aljaž Pegan (SLO)	9.612
5	Dimitri Karbanenko (FRA)	9.500
6	Tom Neubert (GER)	9.437
7	Marius Urzică (ROU)	9.425
8	Enrico Pozzo (ITA)	7.750

== Junior results ==
Full results of the men's junior competition.

=== Team ===
Rank	Nation	Apparatus						Total
Rank	Nation	F	PH	R	V	PB	HB	Total
1st place, gold medalist(s)	Russia (RUS)	24.925	26.812	26.850	27.650	26.850	26.012	159.099
2nd place, silver medalist(s)	Switzerland (SUI)	26.761	25.949	25.062	26.987	26.224	26.437	157.420
3rd place, bronze medalist(s)	Germany (GER)	26.737	26.612	24.662	25.687	27.299	26.350	157.347
4	France (FRA)	25.587	25.512	25.424	26.700	26.637	26.237	156.097
5	Greece (GRE)	26.175	26.475	24.774	27.624	25.750	25.099	155.897
6	Romania (ROU)	26.187	27.274	24.162	27.536	25.475	23.775	154.409
7	Belarus (BLR)	24.612	27.749	24.599	26.762	25.300	25.287	154.309
8	Italy (ITA)	25.350	26.149	24.387	27.049	25.387	25.799	154.121
9	Ukraine (UKR)	26.649	26.050	23.137	26.025	25.925	24.987	152.773
10	Great Britain (GBR)	25.900	25.237	24.862	26.674	24.275	25.025	151.973
11	Hungary (HUN)	24.250	25.836	24.162	25.887	24.937	24.887	149.959
12	Poland (POL)	25.125	24.849	23.162	26.662	24.975	25.099	149.872
13	Croatia (CRO)	25.749	24.750	23.237	26.212	24.412	24.650	149.010
14	Spain (ESP)	25.337	23.500	24.350	26.987	23.025	24.625	147.824
15	Czech Republic (CZE)	24.075	23.387	23.050	26.449	24.237	25.962	147.160
16	Netherlands (NED)	24.862	23.075	23.212	26.237	24.750	24.050	146.186
17	Latvia (LAT)	24.387	24.574	21.962	25.712	24.450	23.312	144.397
18	Slovenia (SLO)	23.725	24.924	22.537	25.937	23.850	23.062	144.035
19	Belgium (BEL)	24.812	22.299	22.674	26.161	23.750	21.575	141.271
20	Finland (FIN)	22.975	22.399	22.075	25.574	21.175	23.375	137.573
21	Austria (AUT)	22.500	20.675	21.412	24.636	23.725	23.175	136.123
22	Bulgaria (BUL)	23.975	21.512	20.937	25.012	22.275	22.150	135.861
23	Turkey (TUR)	22.525	20.824	20.574	24.462	22.325	21.050	131.760
24	Portugal (POR)	22.500	17.225	21.412	25.287	21.725	20.925	129.074
25	Denmark (DEN)	23.675	18.862	19.974	25.674	18.750	21.450	128.385
26	Iceland (ISL)	22.250	19.000	17.287	24.837	19.375	20.575	123.324

=== All-around ===
Rank	Athlete	Nation	Apparatus						Total
Rank	Athlete	Nation	F	PH	R	V	PB	HB	Total
1st place, gold medalist(s)	Maxim Deviatovski	Russia (RUS)	9.350	9.187	9.012	9.225	9.050	9.037	54.861
2nd place, silver medalist(s)	Anton Golotsutskov	Russia (RUS)	8.937	9.125	9.237	9.250	8.875	8.762	54.186
3rd place, bronze medalist(s)	Rene Piephardt	Germany (GER)	8.775	9.362	8.462	8.937	8.925	9.112	53.573
4	Dimitri Savitski	Belarus (BLR)	9.125	8.612	8.662	9.275	8.850	9.037	53.561
5	Luca Forte	Italy (ITA)	8.775	9.225	7.975	9.187	8.562	9.087	52.811
6	Martin Konecny	Czech Republic (CZE)	9.200	8.450	8.550	9.337	8.825	8.300	52.662
7	Fabian Hambüchen	Germany (GER)	9.400	8.175	8.387	9.337	8.650	8.350	52.399
8	Christos Lympanovnos	Greece (GRE)	8.537	8.825	8.787	8.375	8.925	8.850	52.299
9	Mark Ramseier	Switzerland (SUI)	8.650	8.775	8.837	9.225	8.587	8.000	52.074
10	Gaetan Joubert	France (FRA)	8.837	8.700	8.450	8.962	8.387	8.712	52.048
11	Marcell Hetrovics	Hungary (HUN)	8.612	8.825	8.600	8.925	8.325	7.900	51.187
12	Ivan San Miguel	Spain (ESP)	8.512	8.500	7.875	9.325	8.250	8.712	51.174
13	Jeffrey Wammes	Netherlands (NED)	8.362	8.087	8.137	9.312	8.225	8.550	50.673
14	Alexander Benko	Slovakia (SVK)	8.262	8.075	8.500	8.912	8.550	8.325	50.624
15	Sascha Palgen	Luxembourg (LUX)	8.137	7.862	8.462	9.225	8.225	8.525	50.436
16	Denys Kucher	Ukraine (UKR)	7.262	9.337	8.175	8.425	8.537	8.500	50.236
17	Filip Ude	Croatia (CRO)	8.100	8.325	7.550	9.337	8.250	8.187	49.749
18	Kamil Hulboj	Poland (POL)	8.412	7.525	8.012	8.912	7.025	9.012	48.898
19	Ryan Bradley	Great Britain (GBR)	8.425	6.350	7.975	9.087	8.475	8.375	48.687
20	Andrejs Grigorovs	Latvia (LAT)	8.212	6.950	7.800	8.450	8.025	8.325	47.762
21	Tomislav Markovic	Croatia (CRO)	8.362	7.125	7.887	8.462	7.275	8.350	47.461
22	Mario Rauscher	Austria (AUT)	8.412	7.887	8.100	8.362	7.862	6.550	47.173
23	Krysztof Muchorski	Poland (POL)	8.462	5.250	8.125	8.612	8.425	8.125	46.999
24	Nicolas Boeschenstein	Switzerland (SUI)	8.375	Withdrew					8.375

=== Floor ===
Rank	Gymnast	Total
1st place, gold medalist(s)	Adrian Ionescu (ROU)	9.200
2nd place, silver medalist(s)	Georgios Tsiopoulos (GRE)	9.162
3rd place, bronze medalist(s)	Patrick Dominguez (SUI)	9.050
4	Jeffrey Wammes (NED)	8.912
5	Dmytro Deyneko (UKR)	8.712
6	Denys Kucher (UKR)	8.675
7	Fabian Hambüchen (GER)	8.462
8	Filip Ude (CRO)	8.337

=== Pommel horse ===
Rank	Gymnast	Total
1st place, gold medalist(s)	Aliaksei Ihnatovich (BLR)	9.575
2nd place, silver medalist(s)	Krisztián Berki (HUN)	9.537
3rd place, bronze medalist(s)	Luca Forte (ITA)	9.050
4	Rene Piephardt (GER)	9.025
5	Alexander Benko (SVK)	8.937
6	Dimitri Savitski (BLR)	8.562
7	Iulian Ion-Radutiu (ROU)	8.550
8	Cosmin Popescu (ROU)	8.462

=== Rings ===
Rank	Gymnast	Total
1st place, gold medalist(s)	Mark Freeman (GBR)	9.237
2nd place, silver medalist(s)	Anton Golotsutskov (RUS)	9.162
3rd place, bronze medalist(s)	Ciprian Veres (ROU)	9.150
4	Gaël Da Silva (FRA)	9.025
5	Christos Lympanovnos (GRE)	8.775
6	Maxim Deviatoski (RUS)	8.750
7	Ivan San Miguel (ESP)	8.712
8	Fabian Hambüchen (GER)	8.450

=== Vault ===
Rank	Gymnast	Total
1st place, gold medalist(s)	Georgios Tsiopoulos (GRE)	9.400
2nd place, silver medalist(s)	Martin Konecny (CZE)	9.312
3rd place, bronze medalist(s)	Jeffrey Wammes (NED)	9.181
4	Ivan San Miguel (ESP)	9.162
5	Dmitri Savitski (BLR)	9.150
6	Patrick Dominguez (SUI)	9.031
7	Adrian Ionescu (ROU)	8.768
8	Anatoli Vasilyev (RUS)	8.687

=== Parallel bars ===
Rank	Gymnast	Total
1st place, gold medalist(s)	Fabian Hambüchen (GER)	9.262
2nd place, silver medalist(s)	Raphael Wignanitz (FRA)	9.175
2nd place, silver medalist(s)	Waldemar Eichhorn (GER)	9.175
4	Jazi Timofeev (RUS)	9.112
5	Maxim Deviatoski (RUS)	8.987
6	Christos Lympanovnos (GRE)	8.950
7	Patrick Dominguez (SUI)	8.525
8	Martin Konecny (CZE)	8.375

=== Horizontal bar ===
Rank	Gymnast	Total
1st place, gold medalist(s)	Martin Konecny (CZE)	9.187
2nd place, silver medalist(s)	Waldemar Eichhorn (GER)	9.125
3rd place, bronze medalist(s)	Mario Volta (ITA)	9.087
3rd place, bronze medalist(s)	Maxim Deviatovski (RUS)	9.087
5	Aliaksandr Tsarevich (BLR)	8.887
6	Gaetan Joubert (FRA)	8.875
7	Mark Ramseier (SUI)	8.250
8	Rene Piephardt (GER)	8.225
