= 2004 European Men's Artistic Gymnastics Championships =

26th European Men's Artistic Gymnastics Championships
- Venue: Tivoli Hall
- Location: Ljubljana, Slovenia
- Start date: 15 April 2004
- End date: 18 April 2004

The 26th European Men's Artistic Gymnastics Championships were held in Ljubljana, Slovenia from 15 to 18 April 2004. This event was for male gymnasts in senior and junior levels.

== Medalists ==
Event	Gold	Silver	Bronze
Senior
Team	Romania (ROU); Marian Drăgulescu; Ioan Silviu Suciu; Marius Urzică; Razvan Dorin Selariu; Dan Potra	Belarus (BLR); Denis Savenkov; Alexander Kruzhylov; Ivan Ivankov; Dimitri Savitski; Alexander Kruzhylov; Alexei Sinkevich	France (FRA); Yann Cucherat; Florent Marée; Dimitri Karbanenko; Benoît Caranobe; Pierre-Yves Bény
All-around	Marian Drăgulescu (ROU)	Rafael Martínez (ESP)	Denis Savenkov (BLR)
Floor	Marian Drăgulescu (ROU)	Yordan Yovchev (BUL)	Rafael Martínez (ESP)
Pommel horse	Ioan Silviu Suciu (ROU)	Alberto Busnari (ITA)	Krisztián Berki (HUN)
Rings	Dimosthenis Tampakos (GRE); Alexander Safoshkin (RUS)	none awarded	Matteo Morandi (ITA)
Vault	Marian Drăgulescu (ROU)	Evgeni Sapronenko (LAT)	Leszek Blanik (POL)
Parallel bars	Roman Zozulia (UKR)	Valeri Goncharov (UKR)	Yann Cucherat (FRA)
Horizontal bar	Vlasios Maras (GRE); Aljaž Pegan (SLO)	none awarded	Christoph Schaerer (SUI)
Junior
Team	Russia (RUS)	Germany (GER)	Ukraine (UKR)
All-around	Evgeny Vasiliev (RUS)	Dmitri Barkalov (RUS)	Fabian Hambüchen (GER)
Floor	Fabian Hambüchen (GER)	Filip Ude (CRO)	Dmitri Barkalov (RUS)
Pommel horse	Louis Smith (GBR)	Vid Hidvégi (HUN)	Cosmin Popescu (ROU)
Rings	Timofei Lazarev (RUS)	Evgeny Vasiliev (RUS)	Samir Aït Saïd (FRA)
Vault	Fabian Hambüchen (GER)	Oleksander Suprun (UKR)	Dmitri Barkalov (RUS)
Parallel bars	Evgeny Vasiliev (RUS)	Dmitri Barkalov (RUS)	Andrey Isayev (UKR)
Horizontal bar	Fabian Hambüchen (GER)	Epke Zonderland (NED)	Waldemar Eichorn (GER)

=== Medal table ===
==== Combined ====
Rank	Nation	Gold	Silver	Bronze	Total
1	Romania (ROU)	5	0	1	6
2	Russia (RUS)	4	4	2	10
3	Germany (GER)	3	1	3	7
4	Greece (GRE)	2	0	0	2
5	Ukraine (UKR)	1	2	2	5
6	Great Britain (GBR)	1	0	0	1
7	Belarus (BLR)	0	1	1	2
7	Hungary (HUN)	0	1	1	2
7	Italy (ITA)	0	1	1	2
7	Spain (ESP)	0	1	1	2
11	Bulgaria (BUL)	0	1	0	1
11	Croatia (CRO)	0	1	0	1
11	Latvia (LAT)	0	1	0	1
11	Netherlands (NED)	0	1	0	1
11	Slovenia (SLO)	0	1	0	1
16	France (FRA)	0	0	3	3
17	Poland (POL)	0	0	1	1
Totals (17 entries)		16	16	16	48

==== Seniors ====
Rank	Nation	Gold	Silver	Bronze	Total
1	Romania (ROU)	5	0	0	5
2	Greece (GRE)	2	0	0	2
3	Ukraine (UKR)	1	1	0	2
4	Belarus (BLR)	0	1	1	2
4	Italy (ITA)	0	1	1	2
4	Spain (ESP)	0	1	1	2
7	Bulgaria (BUL)	0	1	0	1
7	Latvia (LAT)	0	1	0	1
7	Russia (RUS)	0	1	0	1
7	Slovenia (SLO)	0	1	0	1
11	France (FRA)	0	0	2	2
12	Germany (GER)	0	0	1	1
12	Hungary (HUN)	0	0	1	1
12	Poland (POL)	0	0	1	1
Totals (14 entries)		8	8	8	24

==== Juniors ====
Rank	Nation	Gold	Silver	Bronze	Total
1	Russia (RUS)	4	3	2	9
2	Germany (GER)	3	1	2	6
3	Great Britain (GBR)	1	0	0	1
4	Ukraine (UKR)	0	1	2	3
5	Croatia (CRO)	0	1	0	1
5	Hungary (HUN)	0	1	0	1
5	Netherlands (NED)	0	1	0	1
8	France (FRA)	0	0	1	1
8	Romania (ROU)	0	0	1	1
Totals (9 entries)		8	8	8	24

== Senior results ==
Full results of the men's senior competition.

=== All-around ===
Rank	Athlete	Nation	Apparatus						Total
Rank	Athlete	Nation	F	PH	R	V	PB	HB	Total
1st place, gold medalist(s)	Marian Drăgulescu	Romania (ROU)	9.712	9.525.	9.412	9.762	9.162	9.225	56.798
2nd place, silver medalist(s)	Rafael Martínez	Spain (ESP)	9.612	9.662	8.950	9.325	9.625	9.537	56.711
3rd place, bronze medalist(s)	Denis Savenkov	Belarus (BLR)	9.550	8.912	9.437	9.262	9.475	9.525	56.161
4	Roman Zozulia	Ukraine (UKR)	9.050	9.075	9.625	8.850	9.637	9.612	55.849
5	Vlasios Maras	Greece (GRE)	8.737	9.212	8.512	9.325	9.350	9.762	54.898
6	Martin Konecny	Czech Republic (CZE)	8.987	9.387	9.200	9.025	8.550	9.712	54.861
7	Niki Boeschenstein	Switzerland (SUI)	9.425	8.150	9.112	9.425	9.275	9.412	54.799
8	Pavel Gofman	Israel (ISR)	9.150	9.050	9.375	9.000	8.600	9.137	54.312
9	Igors Vihrovs	Latvia (LAT)	9.425	7.837	9.050	9.425	9.187	9.350	54.274
10	Guenther Couckhuyt	Belgium (BEL)	9.150	9.587	8.287	8.925	9.025	8.562	53.536
11	Thomas Andergassen	Germany (GER)	9.087	8.912	9.350	9.325	7.900	8.800	53.374
12	Ross Brewer	Great Britain (GBR)	8.862	9.362	8.612	8.937	8.687	8.900	53.360
13	Jani Tanskanen	Finland (FIN)	8.975	8.900	8.125	8.962	8.487	9.612	53.061
14	Linas Gaveika	Lithuania (LTU)	8.800	9.375	8.312	8.237	8.875	9.450	53.049
15	Nikolai Kryukov	Russia (RUS)	8.800	9.675	8.525	9.525	8.300	8.125	52.950
16	Sami Aalto	Finland (FIN)	8.950	9.212	8.337	8.937	8.800	8.562	52.798
17	Sascha Palgen	Luxembourg (LUX)	9.012	9.225	8.312	9.275	8.162	8.587	52.573
18	Vahag Stepanyan	Armenia (ARM)	8.687	9.400	8.750	9.125	8.487	8.000	52.449
19	Samuel Piasecký	Slovakia (SVK)	8.250	8.287	8.287	8.525	9.137	9.312	51.798
20	Artyom Avetyan	Armenia (ARM)	8.575	9.150	8.512	9.087	8.612	7.787	51.723
21	Jan Petrovic	Slovakia (SVK)	8.925	8.187	8.700	9.325	8.475	7.825	51.437
22	Filipe Bezugo	Portugal (POR)	9.212	7.550	7.350	8.637	9.050	8.937	50.736
23	Blaz Puljic	Slovenia (SLO)	8.525	8.025	8.200	8.600	8.550	8.475	50.375
24	Runar Alexandersson	Iceland (ISL)	8.950	8.900	8.200	8.600	7.925	7.500	50.075

=== Floor ===
Rank	Gymnast	Total
1st place, gold medalist(s)	Marian Drăgulescu (ROU)	9.775
2nd place, silver medalist(s)	Yordan Yovchev (BUL)	9.737
3rd place, bronze medalist(s)	Rafael Martínez (ESP)	9.675
4	Róbert Gál (HUN)	9.500
5	David Vyoral (CZE)	9.475
6	Ioan Silviu Suciu (ROU)	9.450
7	Igors Vihrovs (LAT)	9.400
8	Denis Savenkov (BLR)	8.825

=== Pommel horse ===
Rank	Gymnast	Total
1st place, gold medalist(s)	Ioan Silviu Suciu (ROU)	9.725
2nd place, silver medalist(s)	Alberto Busnari (ITA)	9.712
3rd place, bronze medalist(s)	Krisztián Berki (HUN)	9.700
4	Thomas Andergassen (GER)	9.675
5	Alexander Kruzhylov (BLR)	9.637
5	Denis Savenkov (BLR)	9.637
5	Nikolai Kryukov (RUS)	9.637
8	Marius Urzică (ROU)	9.625

=== Rings ===
Rank	Gymnast	Total
1st place, gold medalist(s)	Dimosthenis Tampakos (GRE)	9.975
1st place, gold medalist(s)	Alexander Safoshkin (RUS)	9.975
3rd place, bronze medalist(s)	Matteo Morandi (ITA)	9.750
4	Yordan Yovchev (BUL)	9.712
5	Yuri Van Gelder (NED)	9.700
6	Andreas Schweizer (SUI)	9.650
6	Roman Zozulia (UKR)	9.650
8	Yuri Chechi (ITA)	9.600

=== Vault ===
Rank	Gymnast	Total
1st place, gold medalist(s)	Marian Drăgulescu (ROU)	9.756
2nd place, silver medalist(s)	Evgeni Sapronenko (LAT)	9.662
3rd place, bronze medalist(s)	Leszek Blanik (POL)	9.643
4	Filip Yanev (BUL)	9.568
5	Darren Gerrard (GBR)	9.468
6	Róbert Gál (HUN)	9.418
7	Ioan Silviu Suciu (ROU)	9.350
8	Martin Konecny (CZE)	9.093

=== Parallel bars ===
Rank	Gymnast	Total
1st place, gold medalist(s)	Roman Zozulia (UKR)	9.775
2nd place, silver medalist(s)	Valeri Goncharov (UKR)	9.725
3rd place, bronze medalist(s)	Yann Cucherat (FRA)	9.712
4	Nikolai Kryukov (RUS)	9.675
5	Mitja Petkovšek (SLO)	9.537
6	Marius Urzică (ROU)	9.512
7	Thomas Andergassen (GER)	9.500
8	Denis Savenkov (BLR)	9.462

=== Horizontal bar ===
Rank	Gymnast	Total
1st place, gold medalist(s)	Vlasios Maras (GRE)	9.787
1st place, gold medalist(s)	Aljaž Pegan (SLO)	9.787
3rd place, bronze medalist(s)	Christoph Schaerer (SUI)	9.687
4	Jesus Carballo (ESP)	9.662
5	Yann Cucherat (FRA)	9.650
6	Linas Gaveika (LTU)	9.525
7	Valeri Goncharov (UKR)	8.737
8	Enrico Pozzo (ITA)	7.725

== Junior results ==
Full results of the men's junior competition.

=== All-around ===
Rank	Athlete	Nation	Apparatus						Total
Rank	Athlete	Nation	F	PH	R	V	PB	HB	Total
1st place, gold medalist(s)	Evgeny Vasiliev	Russia (RUS)	8.925	9.612	9.412	8.825	9.525	8.875	55.174
2nd place, silver medalist(s)	Dmitri Barkalov	Russia (RUS)	8.787	9.525	9.437	9.362	9.550	8.162	54.823
3rd place, bronze medalist(s)	Fabian Hambüchen	Germany (GER)	9.437	7.800	8.525	9.487	9.387	9.637	54.273
4	Epke Zonderland	Netherlands (NED)	8.975	9.462	8.412	9.025	8.437	9.462	53.773
5	Filip Ude	Croatia (CRO)	9.350	9.562	8.275	9.337	8.362	8.125	53.011
6	Dimitrios Markousis	Greece (GRE)	9.087	8.412	8.487	9.212	8.937	8.837	52.972
7	Claudio Capelli	Switzerland (SUI)	9.287	9.287	8.350	8.900	8.100	8.737	52.661
8	Yann Rayepin	France (FRA)	8.262	9.200	8.325	9.287	9.000	8.487	52.561
9	Andrey Isayev	Ukraine (UKR)	9.225	8.237	8.612	9.037	8.937	8.275	52.323
10	Paolo Ottavi	Italy (ITA)	8.362	8.737	8.537	9.025	8.562	8.875	52.098
11	Flavius Koczi	Romania (ROU)	9.262	9.500	8.350	8.550	8.475	7.750	51.887
12	Roland Haeuptli	Switzerland (SUI)	9.137	8.100	8.312	8.750	8.675	8.912	51.886
13	Javier Gómez Fuertes	Spain (ESP)	8.350	8.362	8.387	8.762	8.775	8.725	51.361
14	Marek Lyszczarz	Poland (POL)	8.762	8.087	8.725	9.100	8.312	7.875	50.861
15	Cristian Guillen	Spain (ESP)	8.725	8.425	8.150	9.025	8.062	8.225	50.612
16	Rene Kratochvil	Czech Republic (CZE)	8.437	8.737	8.162	8.450	8.337	8.300	50.423
17	Adam Cox	Great Britain (GBR)	8.587	8.125	7.375	9.000	8.125	9.175	50.387
18	Tomislav Markovic	Croatia (CRO)	9.137	7.825	8.100	8.712	8.050	8.375	50.199
19	Koen Van Damme	Belgium (BEL)	8.375	8.312	8.287	8.950	8.037	8.212	50.173
20	Helge Vammen	Denmark (DEN)	8.500	7.900	7.925	9.400	8.200	8.225	50.150
21	Carlos Jesus	Portugal (POR)	8.550	8.237	7.962	9.050	8.125	7.675	49.599
22	Sebastian Straus	Slovenia (SLO)	8.462	7.912	6.975	8.637	8.587	7.825	48.398
23	Przemyslaw Lis	Poland (POL)	8.837	6.275	8.175	8.350	9.062	7.600	48.299
24	Lukas Razim	Czech Republic (CZE)	8.012	8.112	6.875	8.150	—N/a	8.462	39.611

=== Floor ===
Rank	Gymnast	Total
1st place, gold medalist(s)	Fabian Hambüchen (GER)	9.587
2nd place, silver medalist(s)	Filip Ude (CRO)	9.437
3rd place, bronze medalist(s)	Dmitri Barkalov (RUS)	9.262
4	Dmitri Petrowski (FRA)	9.225
5	Roland Haeuptli (SUI)	8.962
6	Oleksander Yakubovsky (UKR)	8.950
7	Waldemar Eichorn (GER)	8.862
8	Paolo Ottavi (ITA)	8.687

=== Pommel horse ===
Rank	Gymnast	Total
1st place, gold medalist(s)	Louis Smith (GBR)	9.575
2nd place, silver medalist(s)	Vid Hidvégi (HUN)	9.550
3rd place, bronze medalist(s)	Cosmin Popescu (ROU)	9.500
4	Dmitri Barkalov (RUS)	9.487
5	Konstyantyn Panchenko (UKR)	9.475
6	Robert Seligman (CRO)	8.625
7	Evgeny Vasiliev (RUS)	8.575
8	Andrey Isayev (UKR)	8.362

=== Rings ===
Rank	Gymnast	Total
1st place, gold medalist(s)	Timofei Lazarev (RUS)	0.000
2nd place, silver medalist(s)	Evgeny Vasiliev (RUS)	0.000
3rd place, bronze medalist(s)	Samir Aït Saïd (FRA)	0.000
4	Thomas Taranu (GER)	0.000
5	Assaf Zoor (ISR)	0.000
6	Mark Lyszczarz (POL)	0.000
7	Uladzimir Yermakov (BLR)	0.000
8	Paolo Ottavi (ITA)	0.000

=== Vault ===
Rank	Gymnast	Total
1st place, gold medalist(s)	Fabian Hambüchen (GER)	9.356
2nd place, silver medalist(s)	Oleksander Suprun (UKR)	9.312
3rd place, bronze medalist(s)	Dmitri Barkalov (RUS)	9.256
4	Vlaschaslav Volkav (BLR)	9.212
5	Martin Gordon (GBR)	9.087
6	Dmitrios Markousis (GRE)	9.012
7	Alessandro Di Quinzio (ITA)	8.806
8	Adam Cox (GBR)	8.718

=== Parallel bars ===
Rank	Gymnast	Total
1st place, gold medalist(s)	Evgeny Vasiliev (RUS)	0.000
2nd place, silver medalist(s)	Dmitri Barkalov (RUS)	0.000
3rd place, bronze medalist(s)	Andrey Isayev (UKR)	0.000
4	Oleksander Yakubovsky (UKR)	0.000
5	Waldemar Eichorn (GER)	0.000
6	Fabian Hambüchen (GER)	0.000
7	Attila Racz (HUN)	0.000
8	Claudio Capelli (ITA)	0.000

=== Horizontal bar ===
Rank	Gymnast	Total
1st place, gold medalist(s)	Fabian Hambüchen (GER)	0.000
2nd place, silver medalist(s)	Epke Zonderland (NED)	0.000
3rd place, bronze medalist(s)	Waldemar Eichorn (GER)	0.000
4	Oleksander Yakubovsky (UKR)	0.000
5	Manuel Rickli (SUI)	0.000
6	Aliaksandr Tsarevich (BLR)	0.000
7	Ovidiu Buidoso (ROU)	0.000
8	Andrey Likhovitsky (RUS)	0.000
