= Belarus at the World Artistic Gymnastics Championships =

- Flag of Belarus
- IOC code: BLR
- Medals: Gold 14 Silver 7 Bronze 11 Total 32

Belarusian gymnasts first competed at the 1993 World Championships, after the fall of the Soviet Union. They immediately achieved great success as both Vitaly Scherbo and Elena Piskun won gold that year. The Belarusian men's team won their first team gold medal at the 2001 World Championships. Scherbo holds the record for most World Championships medals won by a male artistic gymnast with 23, 15 of which were won while competing for Belarus.

== Medalists ==
Medal	Name	Year	Event
Gold	Vitaly Scherbo	(United Kingdom) 1993 Birmingham	Men's all-around
Silver	Vitaly Scherbo	(United Kingdom) 1993 Birmingham	Men's floor exercise
Gold	Elena Piskun	(United Kingdom) 1993 Birmingham	Women's vault
Bronze	Ivan Ivankov	(United Kingdom) 1993 Birmingham	Men's rings
Gold	Vitaly Scherbo	(United Kingdom) 1993 Birmingham	Men's vault
Gold	Vitaly Scherbo	(United Kingdom) 1993 Birmingham	Men's parallel bars
Gold	Ivan Ivankov	(Australia) 1994 Brisbane	Men's all-around
Bronze	Vitaly Scherbo	(Australia) 1994 Brisbane	Men's all-around
Gold	Vitaly Scherbo	(Australia) 1994 Brisbane	Men's floor exercise
Gold	Vitaly Scherbo	(Australia) 1994 Brisbane	Men's vault
Gold	Vitaly Scherbo	(Australia) 1994 Brisbane	Men's horizontal bar
Bronze	Ivan Ivankov	(Australia) 1994 Brisbane	Men's horizontal bar
Silver	Vitaly Scherbo	(Japan) 1995 Sabae	Men's all-around
Gold	Vitaly Scherbo	(Japan) 1995 Sabae	Men's floor exercise
Bronze	Vitaly Scherbo	(Japan) 1995 Sabae	Men's vault
Gold	Vitaly Scherbo	(Japan) 1995 Sabae	Men's parallel bars
Gold	Vitaly Scherbo	(Puerto Rico) 1996 San Juan	Men's floor exercise
Gold	Elena Piskun	(Puerto Rico) 1996 San Juan	Women's uneven bars
Silver	Vitaly Scherbo	(Puerto Rico) 1996 San Juan	Men's parallel bars
Bronze	Vitaly Scherbo	(Puerto Rico) 1996 San Juan	Men's horizontal bar
Silver	Ivan Ivankov, Vitaly Rudnitsky, Dmitry Kasperovich, Aleksandr Shostak, Ivan Pavlovski, Alexei Sinkevich	(Switzerland) 1997 Lausanne	Men's team
Gold	Ivan Ivankov	(Switzerland) 1997 Lausanne	Men's all-around
Bronze	Ivan Ivankov	(Switzerland) 1997 Lausanne	Men's rings
Bronze	Ivan Ivankov, Alexander Kruzhylov, Dmitry Kasperovich, Aleksandr Shostak, Vitaly Rudnitsky, Ivan Pavlovski	(China) 1999 Tianjin	Men's team
Gold	Ivan Ivankov, Alexei Sinkevich, Dmitry Kasperovich, Vitali Valinchuk, Aleksandr Kruzhilov, Denis Savenkov	(Belgium) 2001 Ghent	Men's team
Silver	Ivan Ivankov	(Belgium) 2001 Ghent	Men's all-around
Bronze	Ivan Ivankov	(Belgium) 2001 Ghent	Men's parallel bars
Bronze	Alexei Sinkevich	(Hungary) 2002 Debrecen	Men's parallel bars
Silver	Ivan Ivankov	(Hungary) 2002 Debrecen	Men's horizontal bar
Bronze	Denis Savenkov	(Australia) 2005 Melbourne	Men's all-around
Silver	Dmitry Kasperovich	(Denmark) 2006 Aarhus	Men's vault
Bronze	Dmitry Kasperovich	(Netherlands) 2010 Rotterdam	Men's vault

== Medal tables ==
=== By gender ===
Gender	Gold	Silver	Bronze	Total
Men	12	7	11	30
Women	2	0	0	2

=== By event ===
Event	Gold	Silver	Bronze	Total
Men's individual all-around	3	2	2	7
Men's floor exercise	3	1	0	4
Men's parallel bars	2	1	2	5
Men's vault	2	1	2	5
Men's horizontal bar	1	1	2	4
Men's team	1	1	1	3
Women's uneven bars	1	0	0	1
Women's vault	1	0	0	1
Men's rings	0	0	2	2
Men's pommel horse	0	0	0	0
Women's balance beam	0	0	0	0
Women's floor exercise	0	0	0	0
Women's individual all-around	0	0	0	0
Women's team	0	0	0	0
