= Rúnar Alexandersson =

Icelandic artistic gymnast (born 1977)

- Alternative name: Ruslan Ovchinnikov
- Born: 28 March 1977 (age 49) Smolensk, Russia
- Height: 171 cm (5 ft 7 in)

Gymnastics career
- Discipline: Men's artistic gymnastics
- Country represented: Iceland
- Former countries represented: Estonia

Rúnar Alexandersson (born 28 March 1977) is an Icelandic former artistic gymnast. He represented Iceland at the 1996, 2000 and 2004 Summer Olympics.

== Career ==
Rúnar Alexandersson, born Ruslan Ovtšinnikov, won 17 Estonian national titles between 1988 and 1994. He left Estonia for Iceland in 1994 and began competing internationally for his new country. He represented Iceland at the 1996 Summer Olympics and finished 68th in the all-around qualification round, failing to advance into any finals.

Alexandersson won the all-around title at the 1997 Games of the Small States of Europe. He won a silver medal on the pommel horse at the 2000 Glasgow World Cup behind Romania's Marius Urzică. He then won the pommel horse gold medal at the Ljubljana World Cup. He competed at the 2000 Summer Olympics and finished 50th in the all-around during the qualification round and did not advance into any finals.

At the 2002 European Championships, Alexandersson finished eighth in both the all-around and pommel horse finals. He then competed at the 2002 World Championships and qualified for the parallel bars final, finishing eighth. He finished 32nd in the all-around qualification round at the 2003 World Championships and did not advance to the final.

Alexandersson finished 24th in the all-around final at the 2004 European Championships. He then represented Iceland at the 2004 Summer Olympics and qualified for the pommel horse final, where he finished in seventh place. Additionally, he finished 35th in the all-around qualification round.

Alexandersson only competed on the pommel horse at the 2005 World Championships but did not advance into the final.
