= 2002 European Artistic Gymnastics Championships =

The 2002 European Artistic Gymnastics Championships consisted of the following competitions held at Dimitris Tofalos Arena in Patras, Greece, from 18 to 21 April 2002:

- 2002 European Men's Artistic Gymnastics Championships;
- 2002 European Women's Artistic Gymnastics Championships.
