= 2004 European Artistic Gymnastics Championships =

The 2004 European Artistic Gymnastics Championships consisted of the following competitions:

- 2004 European Men's Artistic Gymnastics Championships, held from 15 to 18 April 2004 in Ljubljana, Slovenia;
- 2004 European Women's Artistic Gymnastics Championships, held from 29 April to 2 May 2004 in Amsterdam, Netherlands.
