= Romanian Golden Team =

The Romanian Golden Team is a group led by former Romanian gymnast Marius Urzică and founded in March 2006. Their shows were organized in Romania and abroad.

Among members there are some former artistic gymnasts stars (such as Oana Ban, Sabina Cojocar, Andreea Isărescu, Corina Ungureanu, Floarea Leonida, Alexandra Eremia, Silvia Stroescu) and Bogdan Orzata as well as rhythmic gymnasts. The involved aerobic/acrobatic gymnasts are Luminița Brad, Elena Bustiuc, Simona Georgescu, Andreea Stefan, Andreea Vladoi, Dorel and Mariana Mois and Alexandra Badescu

After a series of performances in the country (including a presentment at Callatis Festival in July 2007), the group made its debut abroad in 2008, when they held two shows at the inauguration of the modern gym in the French city of Angers
