= Ioan Silviu Suciu =

Romanian artistic gymnast

Ioan Suciu
- Full name: Ioan Silviu Suciu
- Born: 24 November 1977 (age 48) Sibiu, Romania

Gymnastics career
- Discipline: Men's artistic gymnastics
- Country represented: Romania
Medal record
Olympic Games
| Bronze medal – third place | 2004 Athens | Team competition |
World Championships
| Silver medal – second place | 2005 Melbourne | Pommel Horse |
European Championships
| Gold medal – first place | 2000 Bremen | Vault |
| Gold medal – first place | 2002 Patras | Team |
| Gold medal – first place | 2004 Ljubljana | Pommel Horse |
| Gold medal – first place | 2004 Ljubljana | Team |
| Silver medal – second place | 2000 Bremen | Team |
| Silver medal – second place | 2002 Patras | Pommel Horse |

Ioan Silviu Suciu (born 24 November 1977 in Sibiu) is the president of the Romanian Gymnastics Federation and a retired artistic gymnast.

== Gymnastics career ==
His best event was the pommel horse. One of his closest rivals was his teammate and pommel horse Olympic champion Marius Urzică, who was defeated by Suciu in Ljubljana, 2004, when the latter won the title while Urzică took 8th place. Suciu is an Olympic bronze medalist with the team, a silver world medalist on pommel horse and a six-time European medalist (pommel horse, vault and team). Suciu was one of the key team members of the Romanian gymnastics team for several years contributing to the 2004 Olympic team bronze medal and three continental team medals (two gold and one silver). He also placed fourth all around at the 2004 Olympic Games.

== Post-competitive career ==
In 2020, Suciu ran for the presidency of the Romanian Gymnastics Federation and lost to Carmencita Constantin. He ran again in 2025 and was elected to a four-year term.
