= Marian Drăgulescu =

Romanian artistic gymnast (born 1980)

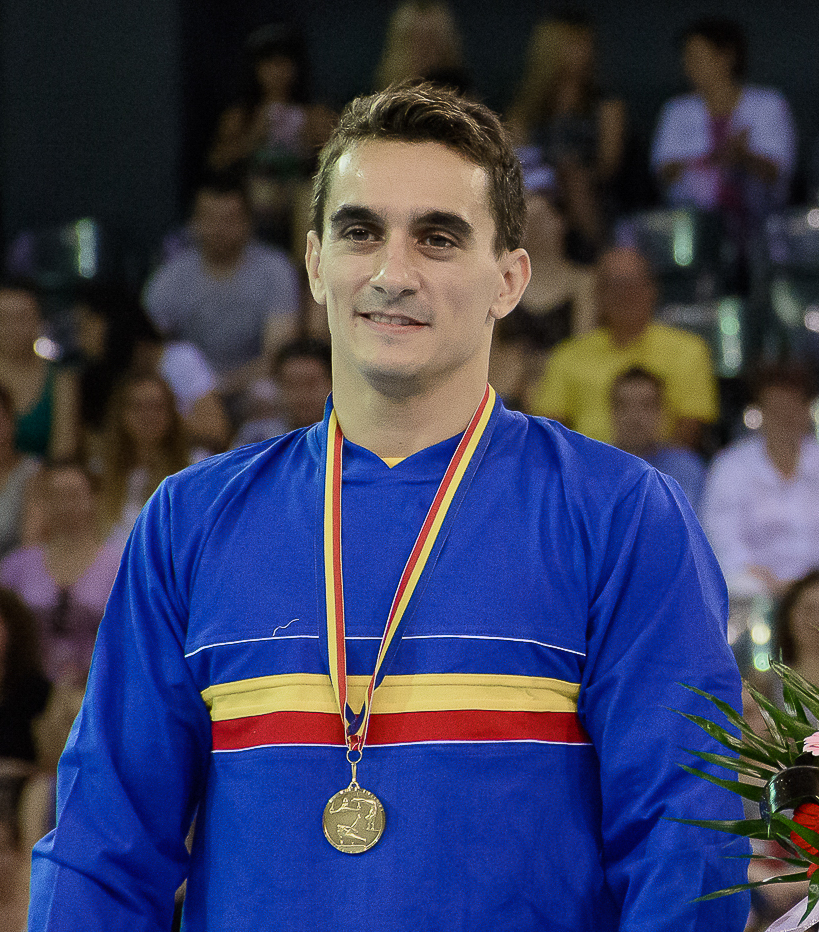
- Drăgulescu in 2016

Personal information
- Full name: Marian Drăgulescu
- Nickname: The Moroccan
- Born: 18 December 1980 (age 45) Bucharest, Romania

Gymnastics career
- Discipline: Men's artistic gymnastics
- Country represented: Romania
- Gym: CSA Steaua București
- Head coach: Dănuț Grecu
- Assistant coach: Stefan Gal
- Eponymous skills: Drăgulescu (vault)
Medal record
| Event | 1st | 2nd | 3rd |
|---|---|---|---|
| Olympic Games | 0 | 1 | 2 |
| World Championships | 8 | 2 | 0 |
| European Championships | 10 | 6 | 2 |
| Total | 18 | 9 | 4 |
Representing Romania
Olympic Games
| Silver medal – second place | 2004 Athens | Floor Exercise |
| Bronze medal – third place | 2004 Athens | Team |
| Bronze medal – third place | 2004 Athens | Vault |
World Championships
| Gold medal – first place | 2001 Ghent | Floor Exercise |
| Gold medal – first place | 2001 Ghent | Vault |
| Gold medal – first place | 2002 Debrecen | Floor Exercise |
| Gold medal – first place | 2005 Melbourne | Vault |
| Gold medal – first place | 2006 Aarhus | Floor Exercise |
| Gold medal – first place | 2006 Aarhus | Vault |
| Gold medal – first place | 2009 London | Floor Exercise |
| Gold medal – first place | 2009 London | Vault |
| Silver medal – second place | 2003 Anaheim | Vault |
| Silver medal – second place | 2015 Glasgow | Vault |
European Championships
| Gold medal – first place | 2000 Bremen | Floor Exercise |
| Gold medal – first place | 2002 Patras | Team |
| Gold medal – first place | 2002 Patras | Vault |
| Gold medal – first place | 2004 Ljubljana | Team |
| Gold medal – first place | 2004 Ljubljana | All-Around |
| Gold medal – first place | 2004 Ljubljana | Floor Exercise |
| Gold medal – first place | 2004 Ljubljana | Vault |
| Gold medal – first place | 2005 Debrecen | Floor Exercise |
| Gold medal – first place | 2006 Volos | Vault |
| Gold medal – first place | 2017 Cluj-Napoca | Floor Exercise |
| Silver medal – second place | 2000 Bremen | Team |
| Silver medal – second place | 2006 Volos | Team |
| Silver medal – second place | 2006 Volos | Floor Exercise |
| Silver medal – second place | 2016 Bern | Floor Exercise |
| Silver medal – second place | 2016 Bern | Vault |
| Silver medal – second place | 2017 Cluj-Napoca | Vault |
| Bronze medal – third place | 2000 Bremen | All-Around |
| Bronze medal – third place | 2002 Patras | Floor Exercise |

Marian Drăgulescu (born 18 December 1980 in Bucharest) is a former Romanian artistic gymnast. During his senior gymnastics career he won 31 medals at Olympic Games at World and European Championships, of which eight are gold medals at the World Championships and ten are gold medals at European Championships. Drăgulescu's strongest events were vault and floor, on which he was a multiple world champion and Olympic medalist. The handspring double front somersault with ½ turn is named after him in the Code of Points. In the all-around, Drăgulescu was the European champion (2004) and bronze medalist (2000) and placed 8th at the 2004 Olympic Games. He was named the BTA Best Balkan Athlete of the Year in 2005.

== Early life and career ==
As a young boy, Drăgulescu only attended gymnastics lessons because they were an excuse to get out of karate classes. However, as training became more intense he decided to switch to swimming because it was free. His father was not aware that he was not at gymnastics, but he soon went back to the gym as swimming was no longer free after three months. Drăgulescu's debut as a junior at a major international competition was in 1998 European Championships in St. Petersburg. There, he won gold on pommel horse, silver on vault, and bronze on floor and in the team event, and he placed eight in the individual all-around.

== Senior career ==
=== 1999–2003 ===
Drăgulescu's first participation as a senior at a major event was at the 1999 World Championships, where he placed fourth on vault, eight on high bar and 26th all around. One year later he won an all-around bronze, a gold on floor and a silver with the team at the 2000 European championships in Bremen ahead of the Sydney Games. His debut at the Olympic Games in 2000 was rather modest, coming sixth on the floor and 13th in the all-around. He soon overcame the disappointment suffered in Sydney at the world championships at Ghent in Belgium the following year, where he was in top form, winning gold on the floor and on vault. In 2002 he added three more gold medals to his collection on two on vault and with the team and a bronze on floor at the 2002 Europeans and at the 2002 Worlds. For his achievements he was awarded the "Gymnast of the Year Award" (2002) by the International Press Association. He received this award during the 2003 World Championships in Anaheim. Here he won silver on vault, placed fourth on floor in a final in which silver was not awarded, sixth all around and fourth with the team.

=== 2004 and the Olympic Games ===
The 2004 European Championships in Ljubljana were an especially successful meet for Drăgulescu. He helped his team to defend their title previously won in 2002. Additionally, Marian won the all around title, and gold medals on floor and on vault. The only other gymnast to win four gold medals at a European Championships was Nadia Comăneci, who captured four gold medals at the 1975 European Championships.

At the 2004 Olympic Games Drăgulescu helped his team to a bronze medal and was a forerunner in the all around event until a mistake on the high bar, after which he still thrilled the crowd with a difficult routine. He won silver in the men's floor only after a tiebreaker was needed with gold medalist Kyle Shewfelt. On the men's vault he performed the exceptionally difficult vault that bears his name (a handspring double front with half turn) and received a 9.9, the highest score awarded in World or Olympic competition since 1995. It seemed he needed only to land his second vault to take gold, but he fell. However Drăgulescu was still awarded the bronze, a controversial decision because the disparity between the judges scores was greater than is permitted and therefore some or all of them should have been altered. They were not, and Shewfelt was pushed into fourth place. The Canadian federation filed a protest, but the result stood. In 2005 the judges involved were suspended for one year.

=== Post Athens and the 2008 Olympic Games ===
Drăgulescu announced his retirement mid-2005, but has since returned and in the world championships in Melbourne in 2005 he won the vault title. He had long been hampered by the lack of a strong second vault, but debuted a new one being a round-off with half twist entry on platform into forward two and a half twist off.

Since then Drăgulescu has dominated that event, retaining his title at the 2006 World Championships in Aarhus, Denmark and winning the floor title as well. Drăgulescu no longer competed in all six events, which had given him more time to focus on those he still trained.

In 2007, Drăgulescu participated in the European Championships which turned to be an unfortunate event for him. On floor exercise, he did not manage to complete his routine. After a hard landing to the back of his head on a layout Thomas salto, he twice attempted to run into his final tumbling pass. Instead of tumbling, he stopped and walked off the podium. That afternoon Drăgulescu competed in the vault final, but missed his second vault (round-off, half-on, 2-1/2 twisting front), landing improperly and injuring his back. Romanian doctors then advised Drăgulescu to immediately stop training and undergo a detailed investigation in the United States to assess the seriousness of his injury. Hence, he missed the 2007 world championships and resumed training only several months prior to the 2008 Olympic Games.

Although Drăgulescu made the vault finals at the 2008 Beijing Olympic Games, history repeated itself and, as in Athens 2004, he fell on his second vault after an almost faultless first vault (which scored a 16.800), losing his chance to win his first Olympic Gold Medal. However, unlike in Athens, Drăgulescu did not medal on any event, placing fourth on vault with seventh on team and floor.

=== Post Beijing ===
Drăgulescu was very disappointed when he failed to medal at the Beijing Olympics, saying "my soul broke" after he fell on the landing of his second vault attempt. He announced his retirement and his intention to become a gymnastic coach. However, he reconsidered retirement and went to compete in Germany for Fabian Hambüchen's club, KTV Straubenhardt. In the club's first three competitions, Drăgulescu competed on floor and vault, obtaining the league's top scores on the latter event: 16.500 in the first two competitions, and 16.300 in the third one. The club won the second place in December 2008. After competing in the German league Dragulescu formally announced his retirement. He went to coach gymnastics alongside his former team colleagues Marius Urzică and Dan Potra at Dinamo Club Bucharest. He declared that his goal is to create a gymnast better than himself.

=== 2009 ===
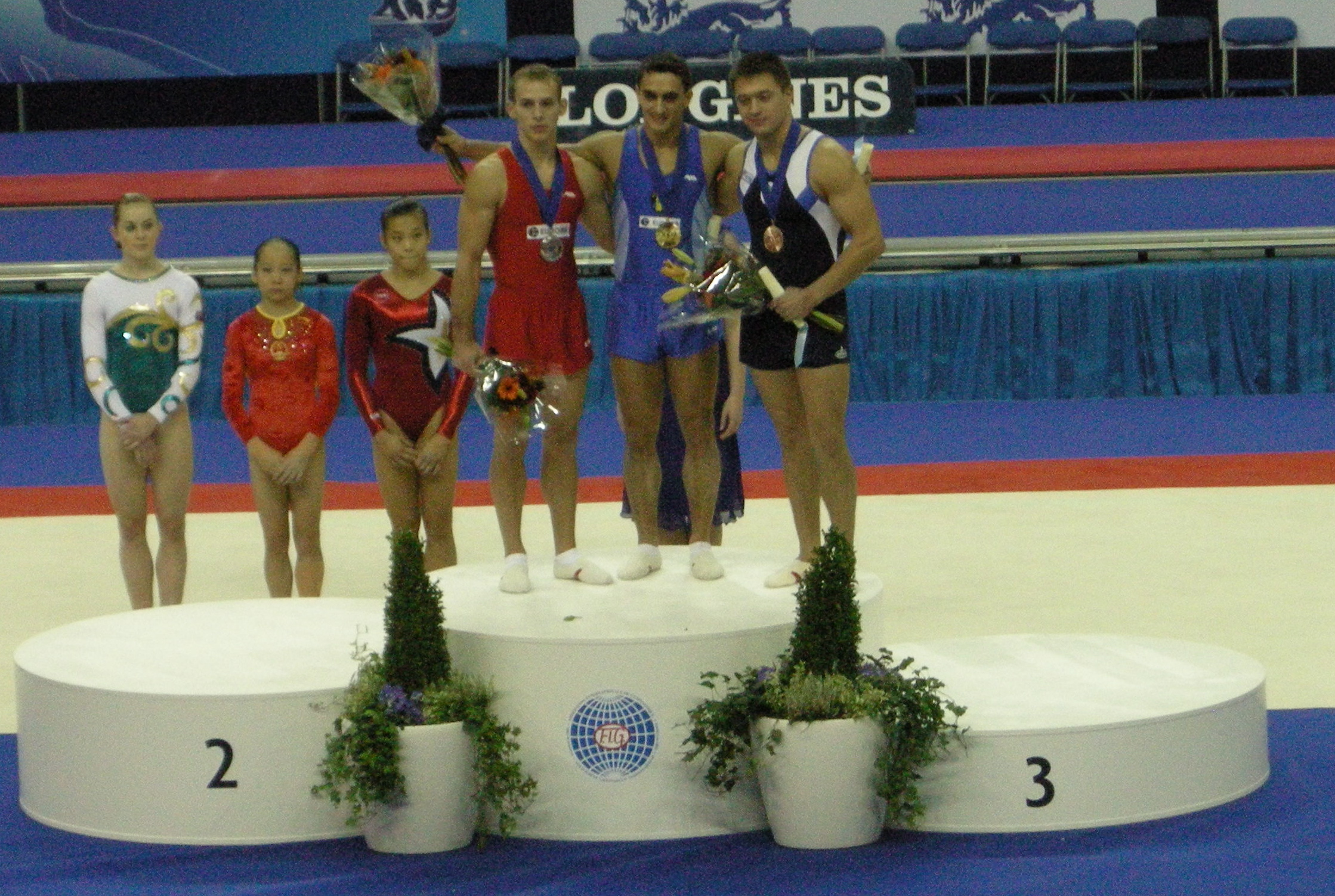
Marian Drăgulescu, Flavius Koczi and Anton Golotsutskov at the 2009 World Championships

In 2009, Drăgulescu once again reconsidered his retirement from gymnastics. He had a very successful comeback winning the floor and the vault titles at the 2009 World Artistic Gymnastics Championships.

=== 2010–2011 ===
In 2010, Drăgulescu skipped the European Championships and Romanian Nationals but was a member of the Romanian team at the World Championships. There, he only competed on vault, floor and high bar, but did not qualify for the team or any individual final. After skipping 2011's spring competition season, Drăgulescu made another comeback in the Romanian Nationals at the end of August. This competition marked his comeback as an all-around gymnast after a break of seven years. In October, he joined the team at the 2011 World Championships and competed in the preliminary rounds, helping them qualify for the 2012 Olympics. Individually, he made the all-around, floor and vault finals giving him a chance to regain his titles, but due to injury, he could not compete and withdrew from all three finals.

=== 2015 ===
Drăgulescu participated in the 2015 Israel Cup winning gold in vault. Meanwhile, he has been training a new skill, potentially the "Drăgulescu 2", which is a Drăgulescu with a full twist instead of ½.

On 1 November 2015 Drăgulescu participated in the 2015 World Championships held in Glasgow, Scotland, and won the silver medal in the individual vault event final with an average combined score of 15.400. His two vaults were the "Drăgulescu" or front handspring double (tucked) somersault with ½ twist, his own skill, and "Li Xiaopeng" or a "half on–2½ off" with D-scores 6.0 and 6.2. Ri Se Gwang of North Korea won gold (15.450) with own D-score 6.4 vaults, the "Ri Se Gwang 1" and "2". It was noted that the 34-year-old Drăgulescu was the oldest individual vault finalist at these championships.

=== 2016 ===
Drăgulescu (age 36) participated in the 2016 European Championships held in Bern, Switzerland in May 2016, tying Armenian Artur Davtian for silver on vault with a score of 15.316 and also winning silver on floor with a score of 15.333.

At the 2016 Olympic Games in Rio de Janeiro that August, Drăgulescu participated in and qualified for the event final on vault. In the conclusion of the event, his average combined score was tied for the bronze medal with Japanese teenager Kenzo Shirai, but after applying the Olympic tiebreak rules to both scores, Drăgulescu was relegated to fourth place due to Shirai's massive combined score on his first vault, which was brought on by the total of his scores in two parts, the final's highest execution score of 9.466 and second highest difficulty score of 6.4, for the successful completion of the now officially named "Shirai 2" or 3½-twisting Yurchenko on vault, a new and an extremely difficult skill, in competition. In Drăgulescu's best Olympic performance of the same two vaults he had been using for many years now, and they were once again the "Drăgulescu" (a handspring double front tucked with ½ twist to land; D-score – 6.0) and "Li Xiaopeng" (Yurchenko, ½ twist on with 2½ twists in layout off; D-score – 6.2). However, he still lost. This was also the second time that the tiebreak had not worked in favour of Drăgulescu at the Olympics. The first time happened at the 2004 Summer Olympics in Athens where he missed out on the gold medal and settled for silver when he tied for the highest score with 9.787 in the individual floor exercise apparatus finals. After applying the tiebreak, Kyle Shewfelt of Canada ranked ahead in first with Drăgulescu relegating to second place.

=== 2017 ===
In 2017, Drăgulescu was once again selected to represent the host Romanian team at the 2017 European Championships. He won gold in the floor exercise event final, his first victory at the European Championships in 11 years. He followed up his success at the championships in vault the next day, winning the silver medal.

At the 2017 Artistic Gymnastics World Championships, Drăgulescu finished the individual vault final in fourth place with an average combined score of 14.716. He had simplified his second vault to the "½ on–double full off" instead of his usual, the "Li Xiao Peng". Kenzō Shirai of Japan, the man Drăgulescu tied for the third highest final score in the individual vault final at the 2016 Summer Olympics in Rio de Janeiro, won the gold medal with a score of 14.900. Drăgulescu was again the oldest individual vault finalist at 36 years, 9 months and 20 days old.

=== 2019 ===
At the 2019 Artistic Gymnastics World Championships, Drăgulescu repeated his 2017 performance by placing fourth again in the individual vault final with an average combined score of 14.624. He had also stayed with the same simplified second vault he competed at these championships in 2017. Once more, he was the oldest individual vault finalist, this time at 38 years, 9 months and 25 days old.

=== 2020/2021 ===
Drăgulescu had previously qualified for the 2020 Summer Olympics in Tokyo as a specialist in the opening rounds of two individual events—floor exercise and vault—but he ultimately chose to not compete the individual floor exercise apparatus and fully focus only on vault. His qualification scores on vault were 13.466 and 14.533 to average 13.999 and place 16, which did not qualify him for the finals. Competing in individual vault qualifications, Drăgulescu was 40 years, 7 months and 6 days old.

== Competitive history ==
| Year | Competition | Team | Individual events | | | | | | |
| Year | Competition | Team | AA | FX | PH | SR | VT | PB | HB |
|---|---|---|---|---|---|---|---|---|---|
1999
| 1999 | World Championships | | 26 | | | | 4 | | 8 |
2000
| 2000 | European Championships | 2nd place, silver medalist(s) | 3rd place, bronze medalist(s) | 1st place, gold medalist(s) | | | | | |
| 2000 | Olympic Games | 6 | 13 | 6 | | | | | |
2001
| 2001 | World Championships | | | 1st place, gold medalist(s) | | | 1st place, gold medalist(s) | | |
| 2002 | | | | 1st place, gold medalist(s) | | | | | |
| 2002 | World Championships | | | 1st place, gold medalist(s) | | | 7 | | |
| 2002 | European Championships | 1st place, gold medalist(s) | | 3rd place, bronze medalist(s) | | | 1st place, gold medalist(s) | | |
2003
| 2003 | World Championships | 4 | 6 | 4 | | | 2nd place, silver medalist(s) | | |
2004
| 2004 | European Championships | 1st place, gold medalist(s) | | | | | 1st place, gold medalist(s) | | |
| 2004 | Olympic Games | 3rd place, bronze medalist(s) | 8 | 2nd place, silver medalist(s) | | | 3rd place, bronze medalist(s) | | |
2005
| 2005 | European Championships | —N/a | | 1st place, gold medalist(s) | | | | | |
| 2005 | World Championships | | | | | | 1st place, gold medalist(s) | | |
| 2006 | | | | | | | 1st place, gold medalist(s) | | |
| 2006 | European Championships | 2nd place, silver medalist(s) | | 2nd place, silver medalist(s) | | | 1st place, gold medalist(s) | | |
| 2006 | World Championships | | | 1st place, gold medalist(s) | | | 1st place, gold medalist(s) | | |
| 2007 | | | | | | | 1st place, gold medalist(s) | | |
| 2007 | European Championships | | | 7 | | | 5 | | |
| 2007 | World Championships | Did not compete due to injury | | | | | | | |
2008
| 2008 | Olympic Games | 7 | | 7 | | | 4 | | |
2009
| 2009 | World Championships | —N/a | | 1st place, gold medalist(s) | | | 1st place, gold medalist(s) | | |
2010
| 2010 | World Championships | | 259^{2} | | | | | | |
2011
| 2011 | World Championships | | 21st^{1} | 2nd^{1} | | | 3rd^{1} | | |
2015
| 2015 | World Championships | | | | | | 2nd place, silver medalist(s) | | |
| 2016 | | | | | | | 2nd place, silver medalist(s) | | |
| 2016 | European Championships | | | 2nd place, silver medalist(s) | | | 2nd place, silver medalist(s) | | |
| 2016 | Olympic Games | | | | | | 4 | | |
2017
| 2017 | European Championships | | | 1st place, gold medalist(s) | | | 2nd place, silver medalist(s) | | |
| 2017 | World Championships | —N/a | | | | | 4 | | |
| 2019 | | | | | | | 4 | | |
| 2019 | World Championships | | | | | | 4 | | |
2020
| 2020 | Olympic Games | | | Q^{3} | | | 16 | | |

^{1}Drăgulescu qualified for individual finals of the AA (21st), FX (2nd) and VT (3rd), but due to being injured, he could not compete in any final, withdrawing from all events at the championships.
^{2}Even Drăgulescu was documented under the individual AA event, he qualified for Romania's national squad as a member of the team event only, contributing on FX, VT and HB to team total.
^{3}Drăgulescu had earlier qualified to compete in the opening rounds of the individual FX event as an apparatus specialist, but chose not to do so to focus just on the individual VT event instead.

== Awards ==
- Gymnast of the Year (2002); he shared the title with gymnast Elena Gómez.
- To honour his past achievements the Romanian Sporting Press awarded him the sportsman of the year award (2005) in a Sports Gala; he shared the award with fencer Mihai Covaliu.
- BTA Best Balkan Athlete of the Year in 2005.
- Romanian Sportsman of the Year (2009); he shared the title with boxer Lucian Bute.
