= Gymnastics at the 2004 Summer Olympics – Men's pommel horse =

Olympic gymnastics event

Men's pommel horse at the Games of the XXVIII Olympiad
- O.A.C.A. Olympic Indoor Hall
- Venue: O.A.C.A. Olympic Indoor Hall
- Dates: 14 August 2004 (qualifying); 22 August 2004 (final)
- Competitors: 81 from 30 nations
- Winning score: 9.837

Medalists
1st place, gold medalist(s)		Teng Haibin; China
2nd place, silver medalist(s)		Marius Urzică; Romania
3rd place, bronze medalist(s)		Takehiro Kashima; Japan

The men's pommel horse competition was one of eight events for male competitors of the artistic gymnastics discipline contested in the gymnastics at the 2004 Summer Olympics in Athens. The qualification and final rounds took place on August 14 and August 22 at the Olympic Indoor Hall. There were 80 competitors from 31 nations, with nations competing in the team event having up to 5 gymnasts and other nations having up to 2 gymnasts. The event was won by Teng Haibin of China, the nation's first victory in the pommel horse since 1984 and second overall. Marius Urzică of Romania took silver to become the first man to win three medals on the pommel horse (silver in 1996, gold in 2000). Takehiro Kashima put Japan back on the pommel horse podium for the first time since 1988 with his bronze.

== Background ==
This was the 21st appearance of the event, which is one of the five apparatus events held every time there were apparatus events at the Summer Olympics (no apparatus events were held in 1900, 1908, 1912, or 1920). Two of the eight finalists from 2000 returned: gold medalist (and 1996 silver medalist) Marius Urzică of Romania and two-time bronze medalist Alexei Nemov of Russia. Urzică had won the 2001 and 2002 world championships, but placed fifth in 2003. The reigning world champions were Teng Haibin of China and Takehiro Kashima of Japan, who tied for the lead in 2003.

Colombia, Malaysia, and Tunisia each made their debut in the men's pommel horse. The United States made its 19th appearance, most of any nation; the Americans had missed only the inaugural 1896 pommel horse and the boycotted 1980 Games.

== Competition format ==
The 1996 gymnastics competition had introduced the "7–6–5" format, in which each team had 7 members, designated 6 for each apparatus, and had 5 count for team scores. In 2000, this was reduced across the board to a "6–5–4" format; the 2004 competition kept this format. Further, while in 1996 all 7 team members could compete on each apparatus for individual purposes, in 2000 and 2004 only the 5 designated for that apparatus competed. The 2000 competition had also eliminated the compulsory exercises; only voluntary exercises were done on each apparatus. The qualifying round scores were used for qualification for the team all-around, individual all-around, and apparatus finals.

The top eight gymnasts, with a limit of two per nation, advanced to the final. Non-finalists were ranked 9th through 80th based on preliminary score. The preliminary score had no effect on the final; once the eight finalists were selected, their ranking depended only on the final exercise.

== Schedule ==
All times are Greece Standard Time (UTC+2)

Date	Time	Round
Saturday, 14 August 2004		Qualifying
Sunday, 22 August 2004	22:39	Final

== Results ==
=== Qualifying ===
Eighty-one gymnasts competed in the pommel horse event in the artistic gymnastics qualification round on August 14. The eight highest scoring gymnasts advanced to the final on August 22.

=== Final ===
Rank	Gymnast	Nation	Start Value	Ukraine	Bulgaria	Greece	South Korea	Georgia	France	Penalty	Total
1st place, gold medalist(s)	Teng Haibin	China	10.00	9.85	~~9.90~~	9.85	~~9.80~~	9.80	9.85	—	9.837
2nd place, silver medalist(s)	Marius Daniel Urzică	Romania	10.00	~~9.85~~	9.85	9.85	~~9.80~~	9.80	9.80	—	9.825
3rd place, bronze medalist(s)	Takehiro Kashima	Japan	10.00	~~9.80~~	~~9.75~~	9.75	9.80	9.80	9.80	—	9.787
4	Huang Xu	China	10.00	~~9.80~~	~~9.75~~	9.75	9.80	9.80	9.75	—	9.775
5	Víctor Cano	Spain	10.00	~~9.80~~	9.80	9.80	9.70	~~9.65~~	9.75	—	9.762
6	Paul Hamm	United States	10.00	~~9.75~~	9.75	9.75	9.65	~~9.70~~	9.75	—	9.737
7	Rúnar Alexandersson	Iceland	10.00	~~9.65~~	~~9.75~~	9.75	9.70	9.70	9.75	—	9.725
8	Hiroyuki Tomita	Japan	9.80	~~9.00~~	9.05	~~9.10~~	9.10	9.10	9.00	—	9.062
