= Aleksei Ignatovich =

Belarusian artistic gymnast (born 1986)

- Full name: Aleksei Aliaksandravich Ignatovich
- Alternative name: Aliaksei Ihnatovich
- Born: 12 May 1986 (age 40) Minsk, Byelorussian SSR, Soviet Union
- Height: 167 cm (5 ft 6 in)

Gymnastics career
- Discipline: Men's artistic gymnastics
- Country represented: Belarus
- Club: SK FPB Minsk
Medal record
Men's artistic gymnastics
Representing Belarus
Summer Universiade
Gold medal – first place	2003 Daegu	Pommel horse
Silver medal – second place	2005 İzmir	Pommel horse

Aleksei Aliaksandravich Ignatovich (Belarusian: Аляксей Аляксандравіч Ігнатовіч; Łacinka: Aliaksiej Ihnatovič; born 12 May 1986) is a Belarusian former artistic gymnast. He competed primarily as a pommel horse specialist and was a two-time World Championships finalist. He won the pommel horse title at the 2003 Summer Universiade and the silver medal at the 2005 Summer Universiade. He competed at the 2008 Summer Olympics.

== Gymnastics career ==
Ignatovich won the pommel horse title at the 2002 Junior European Championships in Patras with a score of 9.575. He also won the pommel horse title at the 2003 Summer Universiade, and at the 2005 Summer Universiade, he won the silver medal behind Croatia's Robert Seligman.'

Ignatovich placed fourth in the pommel horse final at the 2005 World Championships in Melbourne with a score of 9.650, only 0.037 points behind the bronze-medalist Takehiro Kashima. At the 2007 World Championships in Stuttgart, Ignatovich helped Belarus place 12th in the qualifications and qualify for the 2008 Summer Olympics. Additionally, he advanced into the pommel horse final in fifth place. He ultimately placed eighth in the apparatus final with a score of 14.700.

Ignatovich injured his arm while training on the horizontal bar right before the 2008 Summer Olympics. He still competed and placed 12th on the pommel horse in the qualifications, making him the third reserve for the apparatus final. Additionally, Belarus placed 10th in the team competition with Ignatovich contributing scores on the pommel horse and horizontal bar.
