= Dmitri Savitski =

Soviet-born Russian-French writer and poet (1944–2019)

- Born: Dmitri Petrovich Savitski; 25 January 1944; Moscow, Soviet Union
- Died: 11 April 2019 (aged 75); Paris, France
- Occupations: Writer; poet
- Writing career
- Pen name: ДС; DS; Alexandre Dimov; Dimitri Savitski-Dimov
- Website: dsavicky.narod.ru

Dmitri Petrovich Savitski (Russian: Дми́трий Петро́вич Савицкий; 25 January 1944 – 11 April 2019) was a Soviet-born Russian-French writer and poet.

== List of works ==
=== Novels ===
His only work translated into English was the novel Waltz for K. (published in Evergreen magazine, No. 98, Grove Press, NY, 1986. Translated by Kingsley Shorter. Broadcast by the BBC in 1986). It was adapted for film by Roman Balayan in 2008.

His first two books were written in Russian but were never published in the original language, because, as Savitski explained, they were addressed to Western audiences. These two novels were edited under the pen names Alexandre Dimov and Dimitri Savitski-Dimov:

- Les hommes doubles. – Paris: J.C.Lattès, 1979. Translated by Florence Benoit. Extracts were published in Paris Match magazine (1980).
- L'anti guide de Moscou. – Paris: Ramsay, 1980. – ISBN 2-85956-154-4. Translated by Jacqueline Lahana. 2nd ed. – Paris: Ramsay, 1988.

His next books were published both in Russian and French:

- Waltz for K. (Вальс для К.)
  - In French: Valse pour K. Paris: J.C.Lattès, 1985. Translated by Geneviève Leibrich. Adapted to broadcast play at France Culture in 1987.
  - In English: Waltz for K. in Evergreen magazine, Grove-Press, N-Y. 1986. No. 98. Translated by Kingsley Shorter. Broadcast by the BBC in 1986.
  - In Russian in the collection 'Six stories' (Шесть рассказов) (Paris, 1987) and 'From Nowhere with Love' (Ниоткуда с любовью) (Moscow., 1990, Saint-Petersburg., 1995), look beneath.
- From Nowhere with Love (Ниоткуда с любовью).
  - In Russian: in N-Y: Third Wave ed., 1987. Also in a collection of novels and stories Ниоткуда с любовью. Moscow, Raduga ed., 1990.
  - In French: Bons baisers de nulle part. Paris: Albin-Michel. 1980. Translated by Geneviève Leibrich.
  - In Italian: Mille baci da nessun' luogo. Milan: Grazanti. 1988. Translated by Emanuela Guercetti.
- Theme without variations: Passé décomposé, futur simple (Тема без вариаций: Passé décomposé, futur simple).
  - In Russian: Saint-Petersburg: Khimera ed., 1998.
  - In French: Passé décomposé, futur simple. Paris: Du Rocher, 2002.

== Short stories ==
- In Russian:
  - In a collection, Six Stories (Шесть рассказов) Paris: Syntax ed. 1987. (Contense: Waltz for K., Peter the Terrible, Music in pills, West site of Cocytus, Lora, Baudler, p. 31)
  - in a collection of novels and short stories From Nowhere with Love (Ниоткуда с любовью). Contence: the same stories as above plus Low Summer Stars (Низкие звезды лета).
- In Czech: Laura, Petr Hrozný, Západní břeh Styxu, Ludwig van u pilulkách in Revolver Revue, 15, 1991, březen. S. 177–221. Translated by Alena Bláhová.
