= Vlasios Maras =

Greek gymnast (born 1983)

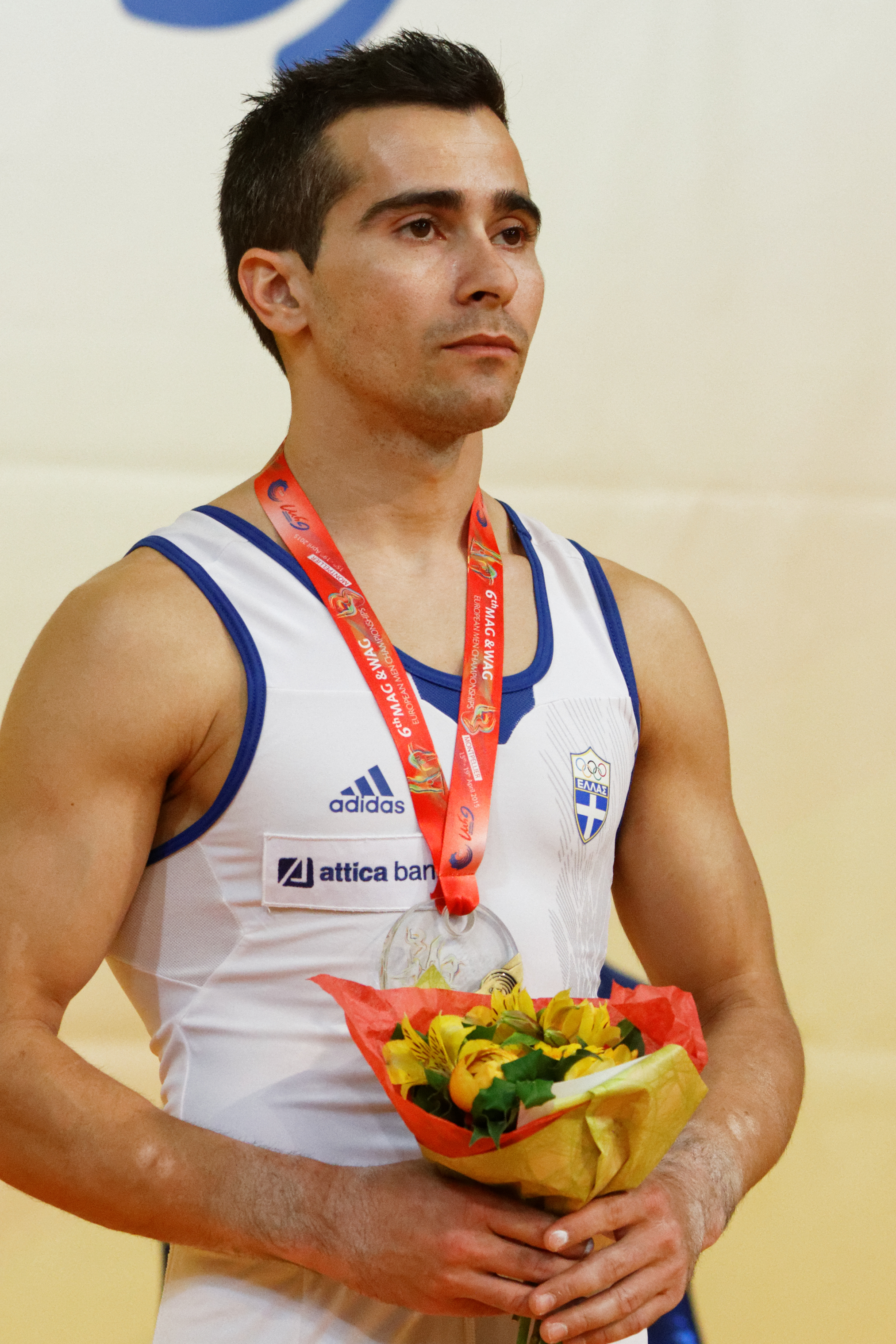
- Maras with his bronze medal from the 2015 European Championships

Personal information
- Born: 31 March 1983 (age 43)
- Height: 160 cm (5 ft 3 in)

Gymnastics career
- Country represented: Greece
Medal record
Men's artistic gymnastics
Representing Greece
World Championships
Gold medal – first place	2001 Ghent	Horizontal Bar
Gold medal – first place	2002 Debrecen	Horizontal Bar
Bronze medal – third place	2006 Aarhus	Horizontal Bar
European Games
Silver medal – second place	2015 Baku	Horizontal Bar
European Championships
Gold medal – first place	2002 Patras	Horizontal Bar
Gold medal – first place	2004 Ljubljana	Horizontal Bar
Gold medal – first place	2006 Volos	Horizontal Bar
Gold medal – first place	2009 Milan	Horizontal Bar
Gold medal – first place	2010 Birmingham	Horizontal Bar
Silver medal – second place	2008 Lausanne	Horizontal Bar
Bronze medal – third place	2012 Montpellier	Horizontal Bar
Bronze medal – third place	2015 Montpellier	Horizontal Bar

Vlasios Maras (Greek: Βλάσης Μάρας, born 31 March 1983 in Cholargos), Athens, is a Greek gymnast.

In the 2004 Summer Olympics, he was a favorite in the horizontal bar competition but failed to qualify for the final after finishing 13th in the qualification round. He competed in the horizontal bar event at the 2016 Summer Olympics in Rio de Janeiro as well, but finished in 38th place in qualifying and did not advance to the final.

Maras is a two-time world champion on horizontal bar and a five-time European champion. He was named the 2009 Greek Male Athlete of the Year.
