= Florent Marée =

French gymnast

- Born: 17 November 1980 (age 45) Saint-Louis, Réunion
- Height: 1.67 m (5 ft 6 in)

Gymnastics career
- Discipline: Men's artistic gymnastics
- Country represented: France
- Gym: Avenir Gym
Medal record
Men's artistic gymnastics
Representing France
European Championships
Silver medal – second place	2002 Patras	Horizontal bar
Bronze medal – third place	2004 Ljubljana	Team

Florent Marée (born 17 November 1980) is a French gymnast. He competed at the 2000 Summer Olympics and the 2004 Summer Olympics. In 1998, he won the gold medal in the men's junior all-around event at the 1998 European Men's Artistic Gymnastics Championships held in Saint Petersburg, Russia.
