= Filip Ude =

Croatian artistic gymnast (born 1986)

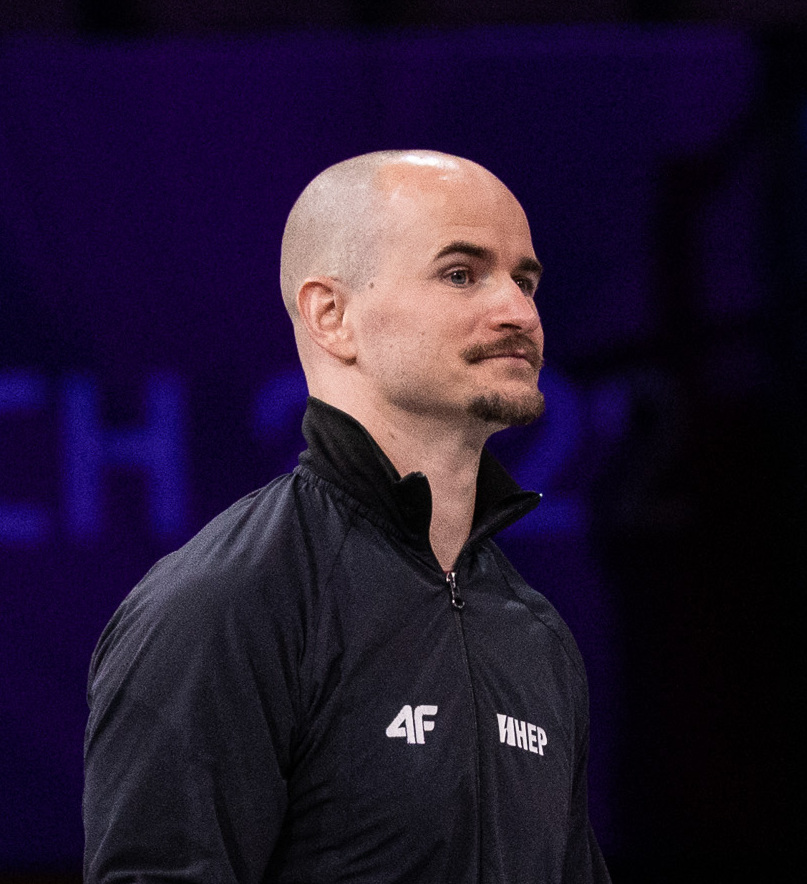
- Ude at the 2022 European Championships

Personal information
- Nickname: Fico
- Born: 3 June 1986 (age 40) Čakovec, SR Croatia, SFR Yugoslavia

Gymnastics career
- Discipline: Men's artistic gymnastics
- Country represented: Croatia
- Club: GK Marijan Zadravec Macan
- Head coach: Igor Kriajimski
- Assistant coaches: Mario Vukoja; Tatiana Goverdovskaia
Medal record
Representing Croatia
Olympic Games
Silver medal – second place	2008 Beijing	Pommel horse
World Championships
Silver medal – second place	2014 Nanning	Pommel horse
European Championships
Silver medal – second place	2008 Lausanne	Pommel horse
Silver medal – second place	2020 Mersin	Pommel horse
Mediterranean Games
Silver medal – second place	2009 Pescara	Floor exercise

Filip Ude (born 3 June 1986) is a Croatian artistic gymnast. He primarily competes as a pommel horse specialist and is the 2008 Olympic and the 2014 World silver medalist on the apparatus. Additionally, he is a two-time pommel horse silver medalist at the European Championships. He also competed at the 2012 and 2016 Summer Olympics.

== Gymnastics career ==
Ude started gymnastics at the age of six after being recruited by a coach at his school. He won a silver medal on the floor exercise at the 2004 Junior European Championships. He finished sixth on both the floor exercise and the pommel horse at the 2006 European Championships.

At the 2007 European Championships, Ude finished seventh in the pommel horse final. He advanced into the all-around final and the 2007 World Championships, finishing 22nd and earning a berth to the 2008 Summer Olympics. He won a silver medal on the pommel horse at the 2008 European Championships, behind Hungary's Krisztián Berki. He then represented Croatia at the 2008 Summer Olympics and advanced to the pommel horse final, where he won the silver medal after winning an execution score tiebreaker over Louis Smith. He became Croatia's first Olympic medalist in gymnastics.

Ude won a silver medal on the floor exercise at the 2009 Mediterranean Games, behind Eleftherios Kosmidis. He had surgery on his shoulder in September 2009 and did not compete at the 2009 World Championships. He advanced into the pommel horse final at the 2010 World Championships, finishing fifth. He then finished 19th in the all-around final at the 2011 European Championships.

Ude placed 16th in the all-around at the 2012 Olympic Test Event and qualified to represent Croatia at the 2012 Summer Olympics. There, he only competed on the pommel horse but fell and placed 32nd in the qualifications. He did advance into the pommel horse final at the 2013 European Championships and finished eighth. He won the pommel horse title at the 2014 Osijek World Challenge Cup. At the 2014 World Championships, he won a silver medal in the pommel horse final, behind Krisztián Berki.

Ude finished 33rd in the all-around qualifications at the 2015 World Championships, making him the fourth reserve for the final. As a result, he advanced to the 2016 Olympic Test Event. There, he finished 15th in the all-around and earned a berth to the 2016 Summer Olympics. At the Olympics, he only competed on the pommel horse but fell in the qualifications and did not advance into the final. He was the first reserve for the pommel horse final at the 2017 World Championships. He missed the 2019 World Championships due to a knee injury that required surgery.

At the 2020 European Championships, Ude won the second European medal of his career– a silver on the pommel horse, behind Matvei Petrov by 0.033 points. He won the pommel horse bronze medals at the 2021 World Challenge Cup stages in Koper and Mersin. He then competed at the 2021 World Championships and qualified for the final, but he fell and finished seventh.

Ude won the pommel horse title at the 2022 Cottbus World Cup. He then finished seventh in the pommel horse final at the 2022 European Championships after a mistake that threw off the rhythm of the routine. He also made the final at the 2022 World Championships but fell and finished eighth in an attempt to increase his difficulty score. He won a silver medal on the pommel horse at the 2024 Osijek World Challenge Cup.
