= Dan Potra =

Romanian artistic gymnast (born 1979)

- Full name: Dan Nicolae Potra
- Born: 28 July 1979 (age 47) Timișoara, Romania
- Height: 173 cm (5 ft 8 in)

Gymnastics career
- Discipline: Men's artistic gymnastics
- Country represented: Romania
- Club: Dinamo Bucharest
Medal record
Olympic Games
Bronze medal – third place	2004 Athens	Team
European Championships
Gold medal – first place	2002 Patras	All-around
Gold medal – first place	2002 Patras	Team
Gold medal – first place	2004 Ljubljana	Team

Dan Nicolae Potra (born 28 July 1979) is a Romanian former artistic gymnast. He is the 2002 European all-around champion and a two-time European team champion (2002, 2004). He also competed at the 2004 Summer Olympics and won a team bronze medal

== Early life ==
Potra was born on 28 July 1979 in Timișoara, Romania. He began artistic gymnastics at the age of five and was a member of the junior national team from 1992 until 1996. He moved to Bucharest in 1998 for his training.

== Gymnastics career ==
Potra joined the senior national team in 2000. He competed at the 2001 American Team Cup, where Romania finished third behind the United States and China. After winning the 2001 Romanian all-around title, he was selected to compete at the 2001 World Championships. There, he helped Romania place sixth in the team final, and he placed fourth in the individual all-around final.

At the 2002 European Championships, Potra competed with the Romanian team that won the gold medal. He then won the gold medal in the all-around final despite a mistake on the floor exercise.

Potra competed at the 2003 American Cup and placed fifth. He competed with the Romanian team that finished fifth at the 2003 World Championships. He placed 26th in the all-around qualifications and did not advance into the final.

Potra won a silver medal on the parallel bars at the 2004 Romanian International. He won a gold medal with the Romanian team at the 2004 European Championships. He then represented Romania at the 2004 Summer Olympics, where the team won the bronze medal behind Japan and the United States. Individually, he placed 26th in the all-around qualifications and did not advance into the final.
