= Koen van Damme =

Belgian gymnast (born 1987)

- Born: 29 April 1987 (age 39)

Gymnastics career
- Discipline: Men's artistic gymnastics
- Country represented: Belgium (2007–2010)

Koen van Damme (born 29 April 1987) is a Belgian male artistic gymnast, representing his nation at international competitions. He participated at the 2008 Summer Olympics in Beijing, China.
