= Filipe Bezugo =

Portuguese gymnast (born 1980)

- Full name: Filipe Rúben Mendonça Bezugo
- Born: 10 November 1980 (age 45) Funchal, Portugal
- Height: 1.64 m (5 ft 5 in)

Gymnastics career
- Discipline: Men's artistic gymnastics
- Country represented: Portugal
- Club: C.D. Nacional

Filipe Rúben Mendonça Bezugo (born 10 November 1980) is a Portuguese gymnast. He competed at the 2004 Summer Olympics.
