= Ovidiu Buidoso =

Romanian gymnast

- Born: 13 July 1987 (age 39) Bosca, Moldavian SSR, Soviet Union
- Height: 1.77 m (5 ft 10 in)

Gymnastics career
- Discipline: Men's artistic gymnastics
- Country represented: Romania
- Club: C.S.S Resita

Ovidiu Buidoso (born 13 July 1987) is a Romanian gymnast. He competed at the 2012 Summer Olympics.
