= Denis Savenkov =

Belarusian gymnast (born 1983)

- Born: 17 September 1983 (age 42) Gomel, Belarus

Gymnastics career
- Discipline: Men's artistic gymnastics
- Country represented: Belarus
Medal record
Representing Belarus
World Championships
Gold medal – first place	2001 Ghent	Team
Bronze medal – third place	2005 Melbourne	All-Around
European Championships
Silver medal – second place	2004 Ljubljana	Team
Bronze medal – third place	2002 Patras	Team
Bronze medal – third place	2004 Ljubljana	All-Around
Bronze medal – third place	2005 Debrecen	All-Around
Bronze medal – third place	2006 Volos	Team

Denis Savenkov (born 17 September 1983) is a Belarusian gymnast. He competed at the 2004 Summer Olympics and the 2008 Summer Olympics.
