= Dmitry Kasperovich =

Belarusian gymnast

- Дзмітрый Леанідавіч Каспяровіч
- Full name: Dmitry Leonidovich Kasperovich
- Born: 15 October 1977 (age 48) Minsk, Byelorussian SSR, USSR

Gymnastics career
- Discipline: Men's artistic gymnastics
- Country represented: Belarus

Dmitry Leanidavich Kasperovich (Belarusian: Дзмітрый Леанідавіч Каспяровіч; born 15 October 1977) is a Belarusian gymnast. He competed at the 2008 Summer Olympics and the 2012 Summer Olympics. He is affiliated with SKA Minsk. Kasperovich is a vault specialist.

Kasperovich grew up in Minsk and started to train in gymnastics at the age of six. Since 1995, he was competing internationally, and in 1997, he won a silver medal in the team competition at the 1997 World Artistic Gymnastics Championships. In 2000, he qualified in the vault competition at the Olympics but was injured just before the Olympics and did not compete. In 2004, Belarus did not qualify for the Olympics.

At the 2008 Olympics, Kasperovich had the fourth-highest score on the vault in the qualifying round and advanced to the final. He finished in sixth place. He also competed in the floor exercise, rings, parallel bars, and horizontal bar in Beijing, with less success. In 2012, competing only on the vault, he had the ninth-best score in qualifying, just missing the eight-man final by 0.133 points.

On the vault, he earned a silver medal at a stage of the 2005–2006 FIG Artistic Gymnastics World Cup series and a bronze medal at the Paris event during the 2011 FIG Artistic Gymnastics World Cup series. He won the 2002 European Men's Artistic Gymnastics Championships in the vault and was the silver medalist in 2008.

He was a member of the 2001 World Artistic Gymnastics Championships gold medal team and the 1997 World Artistic Gymnastics Championships silver medal team. Kasperovich won a bronze medal in the floor exercise at the 2001 Summer Universiade.

In 2010, at the age 33 and the only member of the 2001 World Champion team still competing at that point, Kasperovich won the Belarusian championship in the vault. However, he was not alone among aging Belarusian sportspeople at the time; he was among the examples cited of the 2012 Olympic cohort being filled with older competitors with no apparent replacements.

In 2012, Kasperovich decided to retire from competitions and applied to Cirque du Soleil. He was accepted and spent a year in Canada, but subsequently returned to Minsk and started to work as a coach.
