= Martin Konečný =

Czech artistic gymnast

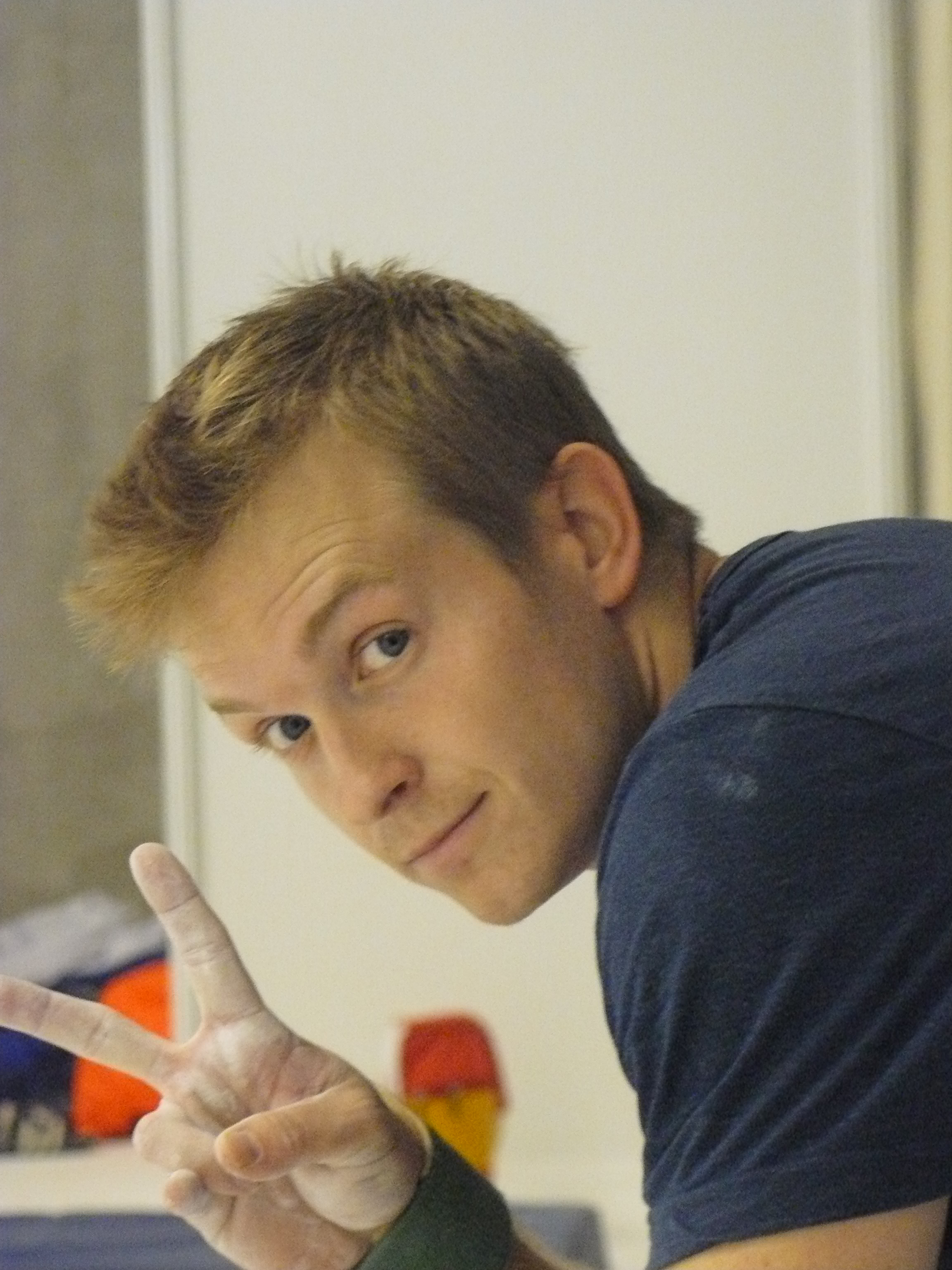
- Martin Konečný

Personal information
- Born: 6 August 1984 (age 42) Prague, Czechoslovakia

Gymnastics career
- Discipline: Men's artistic gymnastics
- Country represented: Czech Republic (2012)
Medal record
European Championships
Bronze medal – third place	2006 Volos	floor

Martin Konečný (born 6 August 1984) is a Czech male artistic gymnast and part of the national team. He is 2006 European championships floor exercise bronze medalist.

He participated at the 2012 Summer Olympics in London, United Kingdom.
