= Yann Cucherat =

French gymnast

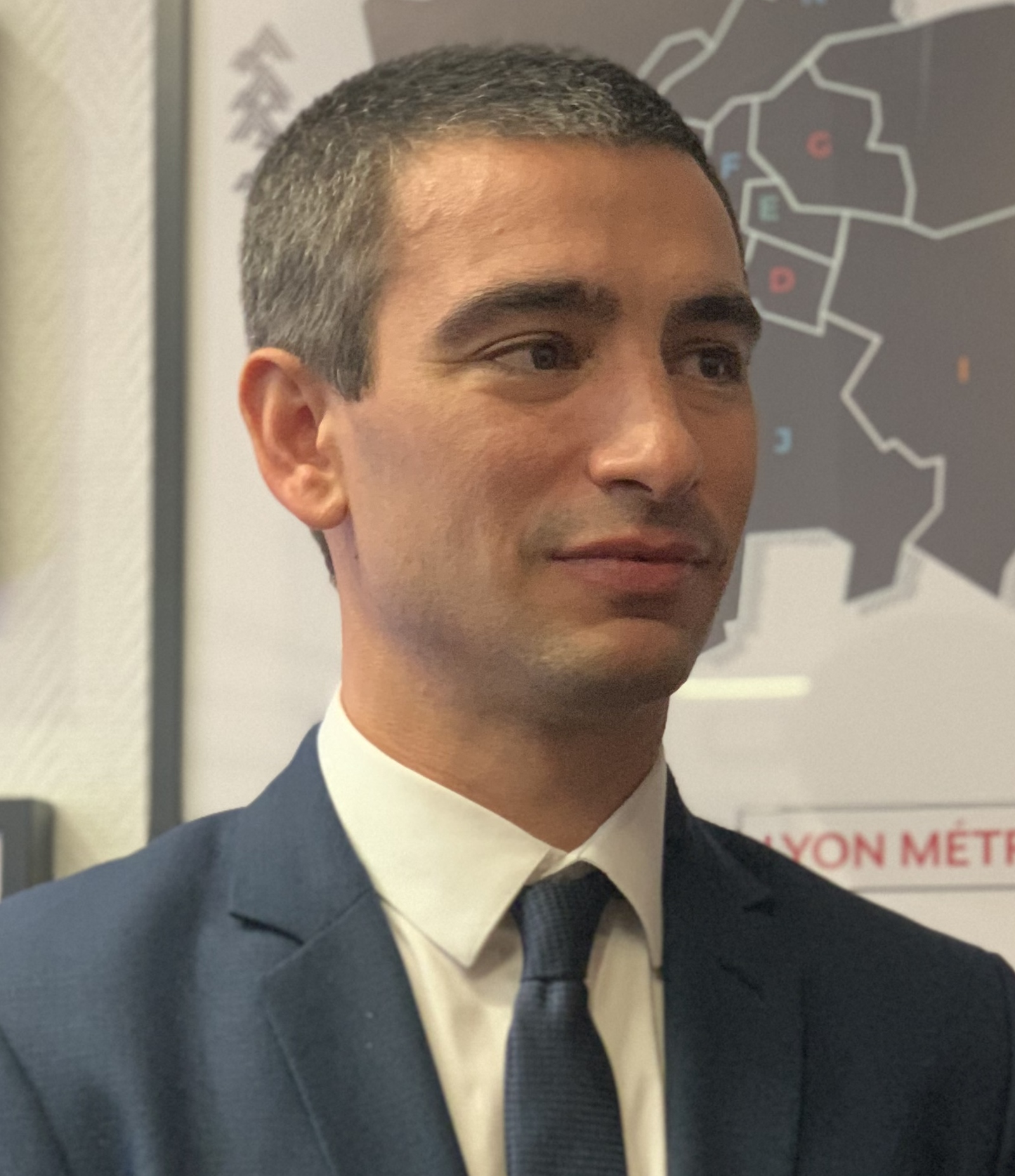

Personal information
- Born: 2 October 1979 (age 47) Lyon, France
- Height: 171 cm (5 ft 7 in)

Gymnastics career
- Discipline: Men's artistic gymnastics
- Country represented: France
Medal record
Representing France
World Championships
Silver medal – second place	2005 Melbourne	Horizontal bar
Bronze medal – third place	2005 Melbourne	Parallel bars
European Championships
Gold medal – first place	2009 Milan	Parallel bars
Gold medal – first place	2010 Birmingham	Parallel bars
Silver medal – second place	2006 Volos	Parallel bars
Silver medal – second place	2008 Lausanne	Parallel bars
Silver medal – second place	2009 Milan	Horizontal bar
Bronze medal – third place	2004 Ljubljana	Team
Bronze medal – third place	2004 Ljubljana	Parallel bars
Bronze medal – third place	2010 Birmingham	Team

Yann Cucherat (born 2 October 1979) is a French gymnast. He won a bronze medal in parallel bars at the 2005 World Artistic Gymnastics Championships. He competed at the 2000, 2004, 2008, and 2012 Summer Olympics.
