= Aleksandr Tsarevich =

Belarusian artistic gymnast (born 1986)

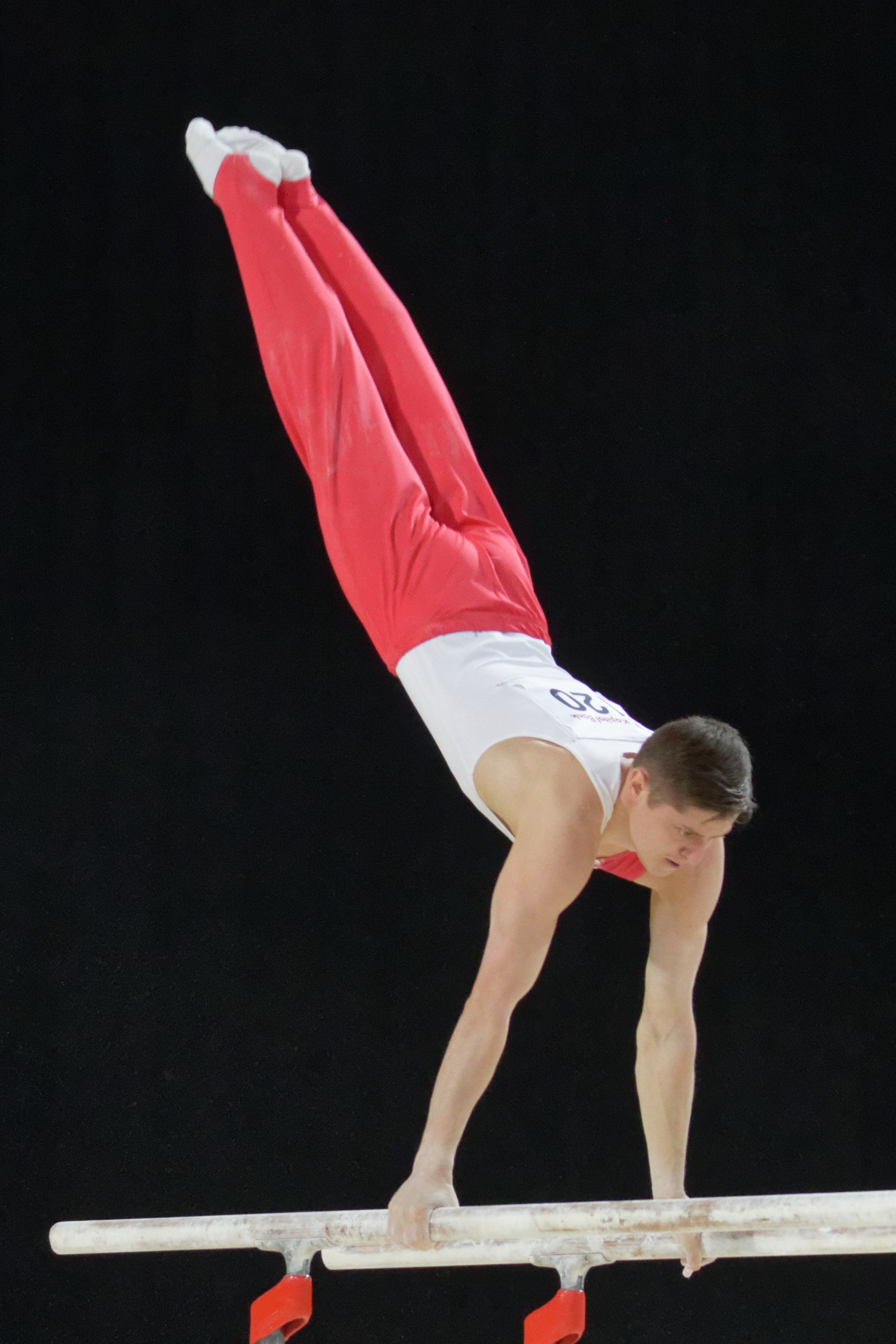
- Aliaksandr Tsarevich at the 2015 European Artistic Gymnastics Championships.

Personal information
- Full name: Aliaksandr Tsarevich
- Born: 13 December 1986 (age 39)

Gymnastics career
- Discipline: Men's artistic gymnastics
- Country represented: Belarus (2006-present)
Medal record
European Championships
Bronze medal – third place	2006 Volos	Team
Bronze medal – third place	2013 Moscow	Horizontal bar

Aleksandr Tsarevich (Belarusian: Аляксандр Царэвіч; Łacinka: Aliaksandr Carevič; born 13 December 1986) is a Belarusian male artistic gymnast. He is the 2013 European horizontal bar bronze medalist. He also competed at the 2008 Summer Olympics in Beijing and at multiple world championships, including in 2006, 2007 and 2009.
