= Aleksey Sinkevich =

Belarusian gymnast (born 1977)

- Born: 10 June 1977 (age 49) Vitebsk, Byelorussian SSR, Soviet Union

Gymnastics career
- Discipline: Men's artistic gymnastics
- Country represented: Belarus
Medal record
Men's artistic gymnastics
Representing Belarus
World Championships
Bronze medal – third place	2002 Debrecen	Parallel bars
European Championships
Bronze medal – third place	2002 Patras	Parallel bars
Universiade
Bronze medal – third place	2001 Beijing	Parallel bars

Aleksey Sinkevich (born 10 June 1977) is a Belarusian gymnast. He competed at the 1996 Summer Olympics and the 2000 Summer Olympics.
