= Dmitry Savitski =

Belarusian artistic gymnast (born 1984)

- Born: 22 February 1984 (age 42)

Gymnastics career
- Discipline: Men's artistic gymnastics
- Country represented: Belarus (2010)

Dmitry Savitski (Belarusian: Дзмітрый Савіцкі; Łacinka: Dmitryj Savicki; born 22 February 1984) is a Belarusian male artistic gymnast. He competed at the 2008 Summer Olympics in Beijing and at multiple world championships, including the 2010 World Artistic Gymnastics Championships in Rotterdam, Netherlands.
