= Marius Urzică =

Romanian gymnast

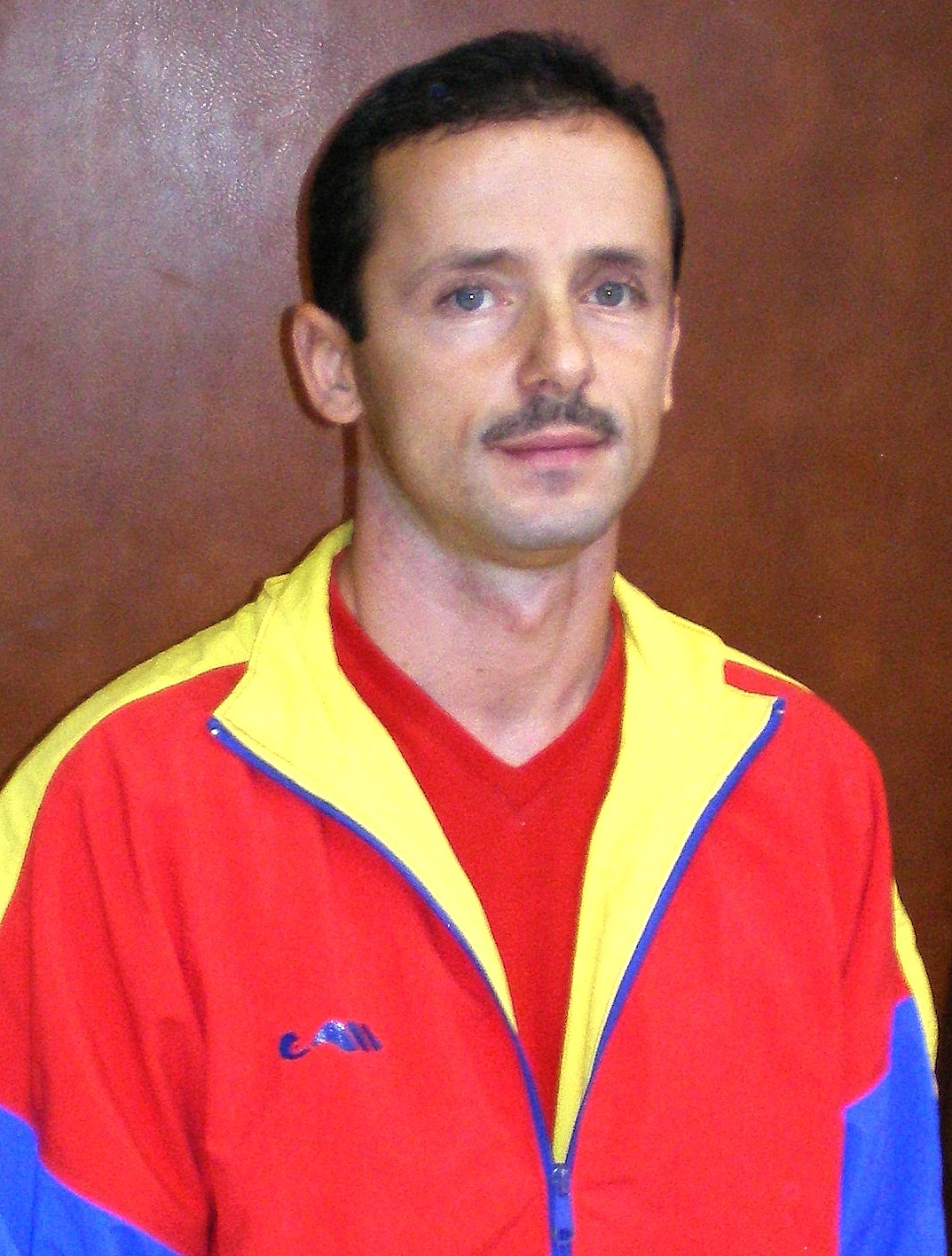

Personal information
- Born: 30 September 1975 (age 50) Toplița, Harghita County, Romania

Gymnastics career
- Discipline: Men's artistic gymnastics
- Country represented: Romania
- Club: C.S. Dinamo Bucharest
- Head coach: József Ferencz
- Assistant coach: Dan Grecu
- Eponymous skills: Urzică (pommel horse), Urzică (parallel bars)
Medal record
Event	1st	2nd	3rd
Olympic Games	1	2	1
World Championships	3	1	1
European Championships	5	2	0
Summer Universiade	0	1	0
Total	9	6	2
Representing Romania
Olympic Games
Gold medal – first place	2000 Sydney	Pommel Horse
Silver medal – second place	1996 Atlanta	Pommel Horse
Silver medal – second place	2004 Athens	Pommel Horse
Bronze medal – third place	2004 Athens	Team
World Championships
Gold medal – first place	1994 Brisbane	Pommel horse
Gold medal – first place	2001 Ghent	Pommel horse
Gold medal – first place	2002 Debrecen	Pommel horse
Silver medal – second place	1999 Tianjin	Pommel horse
Bronze medal – third place	1995 Sabae	Team
European Championships
Gold medal – first place	1994 Prague	Pommel horse
Gold medal – first place	2000 Bremen	Pommel horse
Gold medal – first place	2002 Patras	Team
Gold medal – first place	2002 Patras	Pommel horse
Gold medal – first place	2004 Ljublijana	Team
Silver medal – second place	2000 Bremen	Team
Silver medal – second place	2005 Debrecen	Pommel horse
Universiade
Silver medal – second place	1995 Fukuoka	Pommel horse

Marius Daniel Urzică (born 30 September 1975 in Toplița, Romania) is a Romanian gymnast. Urzică is an Olympic champion, a three-time world champion and a three-time European champion on pommel horse. He competed at three Olympic Games, medaling each time on pommel horse (gold Sydney 2000, silver Atlanta 1996 and silver Athens 2004) and contributed to the team bronze in Athens 2004. His unique technique and style of performance have won him the recognition as one of the greatest masters on this piece of apparatus ever, together with Miroslav Cerar and Zoltán Magyar. Known as "The King of the Pommels" in 2001 he achieved the maximum score of 10.00 on this piece of apparatus at the Glasgow Grand Prix. Two elements in artistic gymnastics, one on pommel horse and one on parallel bars are named after him.

He was the founder of Romanian Golden Team.

== Skills ==
Urzică had difficult routines, which he always tried to execute without fault. Among his skills on the pommel horse was a super E element called "the four Russians on one handle" and a move named after him rated C in the Code of points. On parallel bars he was known for his eponymous salto forward to 1/1 turn to upper arm hang rated E.
