= 2001–2002 FIG Artistic Gymnastics World Cup series =

International gymnastics competition series

The 2001–2002 FIG Artistic Gymnastics World Cup series was a series of stages where events in men's and women's artistic gymnastics were contested. The series was a two-year long competition culminating at a final event, the World Cup Final in 2002. A number of qualifier stages were held. The top 3 gymnast in each apparatus at the qualifier events would receive medals and prize money. Gymnasts who finished in the top 8 would also receive points that would be added up to a ranking which would qualify individual gymnasts for the biennial World Cup Final.

== Stages ==
Besides specific World Cup stages, the 2001 World Championships was also part of the 2001–2002 World Cup series.

Year	Event	Location
2000	World Cup qualifier	Stuttgart, Germany
2001	World Cup qualifier	Paris, France
2001	World Cup qualifier	Cottbus, (Germany)
2001	World Championships / World Cup qualifier	Ghent, Belgium
2001	World Cup qualifier	Stuttgart, (Germany)
2001	World Cup qualifier	Glasgow, Scotland
2002	World Cup qualifier	Cottbus, (Germany)
2002	World Cup qualifier	Glasgow, Scotland
2002	World Cup qualifier	Paris, France
2002	World Cup Final	Stuttgart, (Germany)

== Medalists ==
=== Men ===
Competition	Event	Gold	Silver	Bronze
Stuttgart (2000)	Floor exercise	(Latvia) Igors Vihrovs	(Ukraine) Alexander Beresch	(Spain) Gervasio Deferr
Stuttgart (2000)	Pommel horse	(Romania) Marius Urzică	(Ukraine) Alexander Beresch	(Belarus) Ivan Ivankov
Stuttgart (2000)	Rings	(Hungary) Szilveszter Csollány	(Germany) Marius Tobă	(Belarus) Ivan Ivankov
Stuttgart (2000)	Vault	(Latvia) Jevgēņijs Saproņenko	(Russia) Alexei Bondarenko	(Spain) Gervasio Deferr
Stuttgart (2000)	Parallel bars	(Belarus) Ivan Ivankov	(Ukraine) Alexander Beresch	(Switzerland) Dieter Rehm
Stuttgart (2000)	Horizontal bar	(Ukraine) Alexander Beresch	(Germany) Sergey Piper	(Belarus) Ivan Ivankov
Paris (2001)	Floor exercise	(Spain) Gervasio Deferr	(Romania) Marian Drăgulescu	(Bulgaria) Yordan Yovchev
Paris (2001)	Pommel horse	(Romania) Marius Urzică	(Finland) Jari Mönkönnen	(Belarus) Alexei Sinkevich
Paris (2001)	Rings	(Hungary) Szilveszter Csollány	(Bulgaria) Yordan Yovchev	(United States) Sean Townsend
Paris (2001)	Vault	(Romania) Marian Drăgulescu	(Hungary) Róbert Gál	(Bulgaria) Filip Ianev
Paris (2001)	Parallel bars	(France) Yann Cucherat	(United States) Sean Townsend	(Spain) Alejandro Barrenechea
Paris (2001)	Horizontal bar	(Slovenia) Aljaž Pegan	(France) Dimitri Karbanenko	(Finland) Jari Mönkönnen
Cottbus (2001)	Floor exercise	(Latvia) Jevgēņijs Saproņenko	(Bulgaria) Yordan Yovchev	(Bulgaria) Filip Ianev
Cottbus (2001)	Pommel horse	(Romania) Marius Urzică	(Germany) Sven Kwiatkowski	(Italy) Alberto Busnari
Cottbus (2001)	Rings	(Hungary) Szilveszter Csollány	(Bulgaria) Yordan Yovchev	(Italy) Andrea Coppolino
Cottbus (2001)	Vault	(China) Lu Bin	(Poland) Leszek Blanik	(Ukraine) Valeri Pereshkura
Cottbus (2001)	Parallel bars	(Slovenia) Aljaž Pegan	(Kazakhstan) Yernar Yerimbetov	(Slovenia) Mitja Petkovšek
Cottbus (2001)	Horizontal bar	(Slovenia) Aljaž Pegan	(Switzerland) Martin Fuchs	(Italy) Igor Cassina
Ghent (2001 World Championships)	Floor exercise	(Bulgaria) Yordan Yovchev (Romania) Marian Drăgulescu	—N/a	(Latvia) Igors Vihrovs
Ghent (2001 World Championships)	Pommel horse	(Romania) Marius Urzică	(China) Xiao Qin	(Ukraine) Alexander Beresh
Ghent (2001 World Championships)	Rings	(Bulgaria) Yordan Yovchev	(Hungary) Szilveszter Csollány	(Italy) Andrea Coppolino
Ghent (2001 World Championships)	Vault	(Romania) Marian Drăgulescu	(Latvia) Jevgēņijs Saproņenko	(Cuba) Charles Tamayo
Ghent (2001 World Championships)	Parallel bars	(United States) Sean Townsend	(Cuba) Erick López	(Belarus) Ivan Ivankov
Ghent (2001 World Championships)	Horizontal bar	(Greece) Vlasios Maras	(Ukraine) Alexander Beresh (Australia) Philippe Rizzo	—N/a
Stuttgart (2001)	Floor exercise	(Latvia) Jevgēņijs Saproņenko	(Latvia) Igors Vihrovs	(Kazakhstan) Stepan Gorbachev
Stuttgart (2001)	Pommel horse	(Romania) Ioan Silviu Suciu	(Romania) Marius Urzică	(Belarus) Ivan Ivankov
Stuttgart (2001)	Rings	(Belarus) Ivan Ivankov (China) Huang Xu	—N/a	(Finland) Olli Torrkel
Stuttgart (2001)	Vault	(Poland) Leszek Blanik	(Romania) Marian Drăgulescu	(China) Lu Bin
Stuttgart (2001)	Parallel bars	(Belarus) Ivan Ivankov	(Russia) Alexei Nemov	(Belarus) Alexei Sinkevich
Stuttgart (2001)	Horizontal bar	(Australia) Philippe Rizzo	(Russia) Alexei Nemov	(Canada) Alexander Jeltkov
Glasgow (2001)	Floor exercise	(Latvia) Igors Vihrovs	(Latvia) Jevgēņijs Saproņenko	(Bulgaria) Yordan Yovchev
Glasgow (2001)	Pommel horse	(Romania) Marius Urzică	(France) Dimitri Karbanenko	(Ukraine) Alexander Beresch
Glasgow (2001)	Rings	(Bulgaria) Yordan Yovchev	(Finland) Olli Torrkel	(Germany) Stephan Zapf
Glasgow (2001)	Vault	(France) Dimitri Karbanenko (Latvia) Jevgēņijs Saproņenko	—N/a	(Romania) Ioan Silviu Suciu
Glasgow (2001)	Parallel bars	(Spain) Andreu Vivó	(United States) Sean Townsend	(Bulgaria) Yordan Yovchev
Glasgow (2001)	Horizontal bar	(Finland) Jari Mönkönnen	(Spain) Andreu Vivó	(Canada) Alexander Jeltkov
Cottbus (2002)	Floor exercise	(Latvia) Jevgēņijs Saproņenko	(Bulgaria) Yordan Yovchev	(Romania) Ioan Silviu Suciu
Cottbus (2002)	Pommel horse	(Romania) Marius Urzică	(Italy) Alberto Busnari	(Romania) Ioan Silviu Suciu
Cottbus (2002)	Rings	(Bulgaria) Yordan Yovchev	(Hungary) Szilveszter Csollány	(Egypt) Said El-Deriny Walid
Cottbus (2002)	Vault	(Cuba) Charles Tamayo	(Romania) Ioan Silviu Suciu	(Canada) Kyle Shewfelt
Cottbus (2002)	Parallel bars	(France) Yann Cucherat	(Belarus) Ivan Ivankov	(Bulgaria) Yordan Yovchev
Cottbus (2002)	Horizontal bar	(Australia) Philippe Rizzo	(Italy) Igor Cassina	(Slovenia) Aljaž Pegan
Glasgow (2002)	Floor exercise	(Canada) Kyle Shewfelt	(Romania) Ioan Silviu Suciu	(Hungary) Róbert Gál
Glasgow (2002)	Pommel horse	(China) Lu Bin (Romania) Ioan Silviu Suciu	—N/a	(Romania) Marius Urzică
Glasgow (2002)	Rings	(China) Lu Bin	(China) Huang Xu	(Belarus) Ivan Ivankov
Glasgow (2002)	Vault	(Romania) Marian Drăgulescu	(Canada) Kyle Shewfelt	(Kazakhstan) Yernar Yerimbetov
Glasgow (2002)	Parallel bars	(China) Li Xiaopeng	(Romania) Marius Urzică	(Belarus) Alexei Sinkevich
Glasgow (2002)	Horizontal bar	(Canada) Alexander Jeltkov (Russia) Alexei Bondarenko	—N/a	(Slovenia) Aljaž Pegan
Paris (2002)	Floor exercise	(Romania) Marian Drăgulescu	(Bulgaria) Yordan Yovchev	(France) Dimitri Karbanenko
Paris (2002)	Pommel horse	(Romania) Ioan Silviu Suciu	(China) Huang Xu	(Hungary) Levente Fekete
Paris (2002)	Rings	(Bulgaria) Yordan Yovchev	(Italy) Andrea Coppolino	(China) Huang Xu (Hungary) Szilveszter Csollány (Kazakhstan) Timur Kurbanbayev
Paris (2002)	Vault	(Poland) Leszek Blanik	(Romania) Marian Drăgulescu	(Canada) Kyle Shewfelt
Paris (2002)	Parallel bars	(China) Huang Xu	(China) Li Xiaopeng	(France) Yann Cucherat
Paris (2002)	Horizontal bar	(United States) Paul Hamm	(Italy) Igor Cassina	(Canada) Alexander Jeltkov
Stuttgart (2002 World Cup Final)	Floor exercise	(Romania) Marian Drăgulescu	(Canada) Kyle Shewfelt	(Bulgaria) Yordan Yovchev
Stuttgart (2002 World Cup Final)	Pommel horse	(Romania) Marius Urzică	(Romania) Ioan Silviu Suciu	(China) Huang Xu
Stuttgart (2002 World Cup Final)	Rings	(Bulgaria) Yordan Yovchev	(Italy) Andrea Coppolino	(Hungary) Szilveszter Csollány (United States) Sean Townsend
Stuttgart (2002 World Cup Final)	Vault	(China) Lu Bin	(Poland) Leszek Blanik	(Romania) Marian Drăgulescu
Stuttgart (2002 World Cup Final)	Parallel bars	(China) Li Xiaopeng	(China) Huang Xu	(United States) Sean Townsend
Stuttgart (2002 World Cup Final)	Horizontal bar	(Slovenia) Aljaž Pegan	(Australia) Philippe Rizzo	(Germany) Sven Kwiatkowski

=== Women ===
Competition	Event	Gold	Silver	Bronze
Stuttgart (2000)	Vault	(Russia) Elena Zamolodchikova	(Poland) Joanna Skowrońska	(Ukraine) Viktoria Karpenko
Stuttgart (2000)	Uneven bars	(Australia) Allana Slater	(Russia) Elena Zamolodchikova (Czech Republic) Jana Komrsková	—N/a
Stuttgart (2000)	Balance beam	(Russia) Elena Zamolodchikova	(Uzbekistan) Oksana Chusovitina	(Ukraine) Viktoria Karpenko
Stuttgart (2000)	Floor exercise	(Russia) Elena Zamolodchikova	(Australia) Allana Slater	(Germany) Birgit Schweigert
Paris (2001)	Vault	(Russia) Elena Zamolodchikova	(Czech Republic) Jana Komrsková	(Uzbekistan) Oksana Chusovitina
Paris (2001)	Uneven bars	(Netherlands) Verona van de Leur	(China) Sun Xiaojiao	(France) Estelle Courivaud
Paris (2001)	Balance beam	(China) Sun Xiaojiao	(Russia) Elena Zamolodchikova	(Spain) Esther Moya
Paris (2001)	Floor exercise	(Russia) Elena Zamolodchikova	(Russia) Ekaterina Lobazniouk	(Uzbekistan) Oksana Chusovitina
Cottbus (2001)	Vault	(Russia) Elena Zamolodchikova	(Uzbekistan) Oksana Chusovitina	(Czech Republic) Jana Komrsková
Cottbus (2001)	Uneven bars	(Russia) Svetlana Khorkina	(Russia) Elena Zamolodchikova	(Germany) Birgit Schweigert
Cottbus (2001)	Balance beam	(China) Bai Chunyue	(Russia) Ekaterina Lobazniouk	(Ukraine) Olga Roschupkina
Cottbus (2001)	Floor exercise	(Netherlands) Verona van de Leur	(Russia) Ekaterina Lobazniouk	(Germany) Lisa Brüggemann
Ghent (2001 World Championships)	Vault	(Russia) Svetlana Khorkina	(Uzbekistan) Oksana Chusovitina	(Romania) Andreea Răducan
Ghent (2001 World Championships)	Uneven bars	(Russia) Svetlana Khorkina	(Netherlands) Renske Endel	(United States) Katie Heenan
Ghent (2001 World Championships)	Balance beam	(Romania) Andreea Răducan	(Russia) Ludmila Ezhova	(China) Sun Xiaojiao
Ghent (2001 World Championships)	Floor exercise	(Romania) Andreea Răducan	(Brazil) Daniele Hypólito	(Russia) Svetlana Khorkina
Stuttgart (2001)	Vault	(Russia) Elena Zamolodchikova	(Uzbekistan) Oksana Chusovitina	(Czech Republic) Jana Komrsková
Stuttgart (2001)	Uneven bars	(Australia) Jacqui Dunn	(Italy) Monica Bergamelli	(Netherlands) Renske Endel
Stuttgart (2001)	Balance beam	(China) Sun Xiaojiao	(Romania) Andrea Ulmeanu	(Belarus) Tatiana Zharganova
Stuttgart (2001)	Floor exercise	(Uzbekistan) Oksana Chusovitina	(Romania) Andrea Ulmeanu	(Germany) Lisa Brüggemann
Glasgow (2001)	Vault	(Uzbekistan) Oksana Chusovitina	(Netherlands) Verona van de Leur	(Czech Republic) Jana Komrsková
Glasgow (2001)	Uneven bars	(Uzbekistan) Oksana Chusovitina	(Netherlands) Verona van de Leur	(Bulgaria) Evgeniya Kuznetsova
Glasgow (2001)	Balance beam	(United States) Ashley Postell	(Netherlands) Verona van de Leur	(Uzbekistan) Oksana Chusovitina
Glasgow (2001)	Floor exercise	(Netherlands) Verona van de Leur	(United States) Ashley Postell	(Bulgaria) Evgeniya Kuznetsova
Cottbus (2002)	Vault	(Uzbekistan) Oksana Chusovitina	(Netherlands) Verona van de Leur	(Czech Republic) Jana Komrsková
Cottbus (2002)	Uneven bars	(United Kingdom) Beth Tweddle	(Australia) Jacqui Dunn	(Italy) Monica Bergamelli
Cottbus (2002)	Balance beam	(Brazil) Daniele Hypólito	(Spain) Elena Gómez	(Netherlands) Verona van de Leur
Cottbus (2002)	Floor exercise	(Australia) Allana Slater	(Spain) Elena Gómez	(Netherlands) Suzanne Harmes
Glasgow (2002)	Vault	(Russia) Elena Zamolodchikova	(Uzbekistan) Oksana Chusovitina	(Russia) Natalia Ziganshina
Glasgow (2002)	Uneven bars	(Romania) Oana Petrovschi	(Australia) Allana Slater	(Russia) Elena Zamolodchikova
Glasgow (2002)	Balance beam	(Romania) Andreea Răducan	(China) Zhang Nan	(China) Sun Xiaojiao
Glasgow (2002)	Floor exercise	(China) Zhang Nan	(Romania) Andreea Răducan	(Russia) Natalia Ziganshina
Paris (2002)	Vault	(Romania) Oana Petrovschi	(Poland) Joanna Skowrońska	(Russia) Elena Zamolodchikova
Paris (2002)	Uneven bars	(Romania) Oana Petrovschi	(Russia) Elena Zamolodchikova	(Belarus) Tatiana Zharganova
Paris (2002)	Balance beam	(Romania) Andreea Răducan	(Australia) Allana Slater	(Uzbekistan) Oksana Chusovitina
Paris (2002)	Floor exercise	(Russia) Natalia Ziganshina	(Romania) Oana Petrovschi	(Romania) Andreea Răducan
Stuttgart (2002 World Cup Final)	Vault	(Russia) Elena Zamolodchikova (Uzbekistan) Oksana Chusovitina	—N/a	(Netherlands) Verona van de Leur
Stuttgart (2002 World Cup Final)	Uneven bars	(Romania) Oana Petrovschi	(Australia) Jacqui Dunn	(Netherlands) Verona van de Leur
Stuttgart (2002 World Cup Final)	Balance beam	(China) Sun Xiaojiao	(Russia) Elena Zamolodchikova	(Uzbekistan) Oksana Chusovitina
Stuttgart (2002 World Cup Final)	Floor exercise	(Netherlands) Verona van de Leur	(China) Zhang Nan	(Australia) Allana Slater

=== Medal table ===
==== Overall ====
Rank	Nation	Gold	Silver	Bronze	Total
1	Romania	24	12	7	43
2	Russia	14	12	5	31
3	China	13	8	5	26
4	Latvia	7	3	1	11
5	Bulgaria	6	5	9	20
6	Australia	5	7	1	13
7	Uzbekistan	5	5	5	15
8	Netherlands	4	5	5	14
9	Slovenia	4	0	3	7
10	Hungary	3	3	4	10
10	United States	3	3	4	10
12	France	3	2	3	8
13	Belarus	3	1	11	15
14	Poland	2	4	0	6
15	Spain	2	3	4	9
16	Canada	2	2	5	9
17	Ukraine	1	4	6	11
18	Finland	1	2	2	5
19	Cuba	1	1	1	3
20	Brazil	1	1	0	2
21	Great Britain	1	0	0	1
21	Greece	1	0	0	1
23	Italy	0	6	5	11
24	Germany	0	3	6	9
25	Czech Republic	0	2	4	6
26	Kazakhstan	0	1	3	4
27	Switzerland	0	1	1	2
28	Egypt	0	0	1	1
Totals (28 entries)		106	96	101	303

==== Men ====
Rank	Nation	Gold	Silver	Bronze	Total
1	Romania	16	8	5	29
2	China	8	5	3	16
3	Latvia	7	3	1	11
4	Bulgaria	6	5	7	18
5	Slovenia	4	0	3	7
6	Hungary	3	3	4	10
7	France	3	2	2	7
8	Belarus	3	1	9	13
9	Canada	2	2	5	9
10	United States	2	2	3	7
11	Australia	2	2	0	4
11	Poland	2	2	0	4
13	Spain	2	1	3	6
14	Ukraine	1	4	3	8
15	Russia	1	3	0	4
16	Finland	1	2	2	5
17	Cuba	1	1	1	3
18	Greece	1	0	0	1
19	Italy	0	5	4	9
20	Germany	0	3	2	5
21	Kazakhstan	0	1	3	4
22	Switzerland	0	1	1	2
23	Egypt	0	0	1	1
Totals (23 entries)		65	56	62	183

==== Women ====
Rank	Nation	Gold	Silver	Bronze	Total
1	Russia	13	9	5	27
2	Romania	8	4	2	14
3	Uzbekistan	5	5	5	15
4	China	5	3	2	10
5	Netherlands	4	5	5	14
6	Australia	3	5	1	9
7	United States	1	1	1	3
8	Brazil	1	1	0	2
9	Great Britain	1	0	0	1
10	Czech Republic	0	2	4	6
11	Spain	0	2	1	3
12	Poland	0	2	0	2
13	Italy	0	1	1	2
14	Germany	0	0	4	4
15	Ukraine	0	0	3	3
16	Belarus	0	0	2	2
16	Bulgaria	0	0	2	2
18	France	0	0	1	1
Totals (18 entries)		41	40	39	120

== See also ==
- 2001–2002 FIG Rhythmic Gymnastics World Cup series
