= Guard Young =

American artistic gymnast

- Full name: Guard Wayne Young
- Born: June 3, 1977 (age 49) State College, Pennsylvania, U.S.
- Height: 160 cm (5 ft 3 in)

Gymnastics career
- Discipline: Men's artistic gymnastics
- Country represented: United States (1998–2005)
- College team: BYU Cougars
- Gym: Team Chevron; Team Texaco; Bart Conner Gymnastics Academy
- Head coach: Mark Williams
- Former coach: Makoto Sakamoto
Medal record
Men's artistic gymnastics
Representing United States
| Event | 1st | 2nd | 3rd |
|---|---|---|---|
| Olympic Games | 0 | 1 | 0 |
| World Championships | 0 | 1 | 0 |
| Pan American Championships | 0 | 1 | 0 |
| Total | 0 | 3 | 0 |
Olympic Games
| Silver medal – second place | 2004 Athens | Team |
World Championships
| Silver medal – second place | 2001 Ghent | Team |
Pan American Championships
| Silver medal – second place | 2001 Cancún | Team |

Guard Wayne Young (born June 3, 1977 in State College, Pennsylvania) is a retired American gymnast. He was a member of the United States men's national artistic gymnastics team and was named three-times to the World Championships team, and contributed to a silver medal in the men's team competition in 2001. Three years later, at the 2004 Summer Olympics in Athens, Young helped his U.S. squad to earn a silver medal in the same program, a best finish since 1984. Young earned six All-American and two NCAA titles in the men's vault during his college career. In 2010, Young was inducted into the BYU Cougars Hall of Fame.

== Early life and education ==
Young was born in State College, Pennsylvania, the son of a former gymnast and 1976 U.S. Olympic team captain Wayne Young. He started gymnastics at the age of ten, coached by his father. When his family moved to Norman, Oklahoma at the age of 12, Young trained under head coach Mark Williams, first at Oklahoma Gold and then later moving with Williams to the Bart Conner Gymnastics Academy. Because of his coach's guidance, he became a junior national champion in 1996, and later a full-fledged member of the U.S. senior gymnastics team.

Young attended his father's alma mater Brigham Young University in Provo, Utah, where he competed for the BYU Cougars gymnastics team. During his college career, he received a total of six All-American titles and became a double vault champion and all-around runner-up at the NCAA Gymnastics Championships. At the end of his junior year, the men's gymnastics program at BYU was cut. He missed a spot on the 2000 U.S. squad, finishing tenth in the all-around at the trials. In 2001, Young graduated from the University with a Bachelor of Arts degree in communications major in broadcast journalism.

== Career ==
=== 2001–2003 ===
Young made his official debut at the 2001 World Artistic Gymnastics Championships in Ghent, Belgium, where he earned a silver medal for the U.S. gymnastics team in the men's team competition with a total score of 166.845. He however did not contribute to the team score in the team final. While continuing to train at the Olympic level, Young accepted a position as an assistant coach for the University of Oklahoma gymnastics team, reuniting with his junior coach, Mark Williams. Young helped the Sooners to three NCAA team titles before leaving for another position in Northern California in 2005.

=== 2004 Summer Olympics ===
Young competed for the United States, as a 27-year-old, at the 2004 Summer Olympics in Athens by earning a spot in the men's gymnastics team from the Olympic trials in Boston. On the first day of the Games, Young qualified for floor exercise final with a score of 9.700 in the prelims, but was prohibited from advancing due to the two per-country rule, with teammates Paul and Morgan Hamm ranking above him. In the team all-around, Young ended a 20-year-old drought to capture a silver for the U.S. men's best medal finish, joining on top of the podium by Jason Gatson, Paul Hamm, Morgan Hamm, Blaine Wilson, and Brett McClure. During the competition, Young performed a floor (9.700), rings (9.475), and vault (9.350) to sum up the team's total to 172.933, trailing Japan by almost a full point.

== Life after gymnastics ==
Shortly after the Olympics, Young announced his retirement from competitive gymnastics to further continue his career as an assistant coach. After leaving Oklahoma in 2005 he coached in Northern California and eventually opened several preschool gyms in the state, calling his business Youngsters. In 2011, he returned to Oklahoma to rejoin Mark Williams as an assistant coach for the Sooners. With Young's help, the Oklahoma men's gymnastics team won the 2015 NCAA National Team Championship.

Because of a full commitment and dedication to his sporting accomplishments, Young was inducted to the Hall of Fame by the Brigham Young University in 2010.

Since 1999, Young is married to school teacher Alisha Tolman, and the couple currently reside with their three children in Norman, Oklahoma. The family are devout Mormons.

Guard was named the Head Coach of the Brigham Young University women's gymnastics team on May 14, 2015.
