= Brett McClure =

American artistic gymnast

- Full name: Brett Dallas McClure
- Born: February 19, 1981 (age 45) Yakima, Washington, U.S.
- Height: 167 cm (5 ft 6 in)
- Spouse: Jaycie Phelps (m. 2005; div. 2008)

Gymnastics career
- Discipline: Men's artistic gymnastics
- Country represented: United States; (1999–2006)
- Gym: USOTC; Team Chevron; Team Texaco
- Head coach: Vitaly Marinich
- Retired: 2006
Medal record
Men's artistic gymnastics
Representing United States
| Event | 1st | 2nd | 3rd |
|---|---|---|---|
| Olympic Games | 0 | 1 | 0 |
| World Championships | 0 | 2 | 0 |
| Goodwill Games | 0 | 0 | 1 |
| Pacific Alliance Championships | 1 | 2 | 0 |
| Total | 1 | 5 | 1 |
Olympic Games
| Silver medal – second place | 2004 Athens | Team |
World Championships
| Silver medal – second place | 2001 Ghent | Team |
| Silver medal – second place | 2003 Anaheim | Team |
Goodwill Games
| Bronze medal – third place | 2001 Brisbane | Pommel horse |
Pacific Alliance Championships
| Gold medal – first place | 2002 Vancouver | Team |
| Silver medal – second place | 2002 Vancouver | All-around |
| Silver medal – second place | 2002 Vancouver | Pommel horse |

Brett Dallas McClure (born February 19, 1981) is a retired American gymnast. He was a member of the United States men's national artistic gymnastics team and won a bronze medal in the pommel horse at the 2001 Goodwill Games in Brisbane, Australia. He helped his U.S. gymnastics team earn a silver in the team competition at the 2004 Summer Olympics in Athens. During his sporting career, he collected two more silver medals in the same program at the World Artistic Gymnastics Championships (2001 and 2003). McClure is currently the high performance Director with USA men's gymnastics.

== Early life and education ==
McClure was born in Yakima, Washington, the son of Les and Judy McClure. He started gymnastics at the age of nine under the influence of his father, who pushed him to train and perform ten pushups from a handstand position against the wall. When his family later resided in Mill Creek, Washington, he spent two years at Henry M. Jackson High School and finished early at Chrysalis School in Woodinville, during which time he trained at Cascade Elite Gymnastics in Mountlake Terrace, WA. In 1999, McClure moved to Colorado Springs, Colorado, to work and train as a full-time resident athlete at the U.S. Olympic Training Center, under head coach Vitaly Marinich.

== Career ==
=== 2001–2003 ===
McClure made his official worldwide debut at the 2001 Goodwill Games in Brisbane, Australia, where he received an average score of 9.362 to bring home the bronze medal in the pommel horse, finishing behind China's Huang Xu and Romania's Marius Urzică. On that same year, he added a silver to his annual hardware in the men's team all-around competition (a total of 166.845) at the World Artistic Gymnastics Championships in Ghent, Belgium.

At the 2003 World Artistic Gymnastics Championships in Anaheim, California, McClure scored highest for the United States in team qualification on the pommel horse and horizontal bar to give the team a second straight silver in the men's team all-around competition. His team received a composite score of 171.121, which trailed China by nearly eight-tenths of a point (0.8).

=== 2004 Summer Olympics ===
McClure competed for the United States at the 2004 Summer Olympics in Athens by earning a spot in the men's gymnastics team from the Olympic trials in Boston. On the first day of the Games, McClure joined with his teammate Paul Hamm in the individual all-around final from the prelim stage, finishing nineteenth with an entry score of 56.323. In the team all-around, McClure ended a 20-year-old drought to capture a silver for the U.S. men's best medal finish, joining on top of the podium by Jason Gatson, Paul Hamm, Morgan Hamm, Blaine Wilson, and Guard Young. During the competition, McClure performed a pommel horse (9.650) and horizontal bar (9.412) to sum up the team's total to 172.933, trailing Japan by almost a full point. In his final event, the individual all-around, McClure finished outside the medals in ninth place with a score of 57.248, just six-tenths of a point behind his teammate Hamm.

== Life after gymnastics ==
McClure married Jaycie Phelps in February 2005 at Olowalu, Hawaii. The two divorced in 2008.

On May 25, 2006, McClure announced his retirement from competitive gymnastics to pursue other opportunities and spend time with his family in Colorado. He was later named assistant coach of the Air Force Falcons gymnastics team at the United States Air Force Academy near Colorado Springs, Colorado. In June 2013 he took a coaching position at UC Berkeley for Cal Men's Gymnastics team. In 2015, he led the Bears to their first appearance in NCAA team finals since 2012. As of May 1, 2017, McClure is the high performance director with USA men's gymnastics.
