= 2001 World Artistic Gymnastics Championships =

Gymnastics competition

- Venue: Flanders Sports Arena
- Location: Ghent, Belgium
- Start date: October 24, 2001
- End date: November 4, 2001

The 35th Artistic Gymnastics World Championships were held in Ghent, Belgium, in 2001 at the Flanders Sports Arena. This was the first Worlds at which the 6-3-3—six athletes per team, three compete, all three scores count—format was used in team finals. 2001 Worlds was also the last World Championships in which three gymnasts per country were permitted to advance to the all-around finals.

== Results ==
Event	Gold	Silver	Bronze
Men
Team all-around	Belarus; Ivan Ivankov; Alexei Sinkevich; Dmitry Kasperovich; Vitali Valinchuk; Aleksandr Kruzhilov; Denis Savenkov	United States; Sean Townsend; Stephen McCain; Guard Young; Raj Bhavsar; Brett McClure; Paul Hamm	Ukraine; Alexander Beresh; Sergei Vyaltsev; Roman Zozulya; Andrei Lipsky; Ruslan Mezentsev; Andrei Mikhailichenko
Individual all-around	(China) Feng Jing	(Belarus) Ivan Ivankov	(Bulgaria) Yordan Yovchev
Floor	(Bulgaria) Yordan Yovchev (Romania) Marian Drăgulescu	none awarded	(Latvia) Igors Vihrovs
Pommel horse	(Romania) Marius Urzică	(China) Xiao Qin	(Ukraine) Alexander Beresh
Rings	(Bulgaria) Yordan Yovchev	(Hungary) Szilveszter Csollány	(Italy) Andrea Coppolino
Vault	(Romania) Marian Drăgulescu	(Latvia) Jevgēņijs Saproņenko	(Cuba) Charles Tamayo
Parallel bars	(United States) Sean Townsend	(Cuba) Erick López	(Belarus) Ivan Ivankov
Horizontal bar	(Greece) Vlasios Maras	(Ukraine) Alexander Beresh (Australia) Philippe Rizzo	none awarded
Women
Team all-around	Romania; Andreea Răducan; Sabina Cojocar; Andreea Ulmeanu; Silvia Stroescu; Carmen Ionescu; Loredana Boboc	Russia; Svetlana Khorkina; Natalia Ziganshina; Ludmila Ezhova; Maria Zasypkina; Elena Zamolodchikova	United States; Tasha Schwikert; Ashley Miles; Tabitha Yim; Rachel Tidd; Mohini Bhardwaj; Katie Heenan
Individual all-around	(Russia) Svetlana Khorkina	(Russia) Natalia Ziganshina	(Romania) Andreea Răducan
Vault	(Russia) Svetlana Khorkina	(Uzbekistan) Oksana Chusovitina	(Romania) Andreea Răducan
Uneven bars	(Russia) Svetlana Khorkina	(Netherlands) Renske Endel	(United States) Katie Heenan
Balance beam	(Romania) Andreea Răducan	(Russia) Ludmila Ezhova	(China) Sun Xiaojiao
Floor	(Romania) Andreea Răducan	(Brazil) Daniele Hypólito	(Russia) Svetlana Khorkina

== Medal table ==
=== Overall ===
Rank	Nation	Gold	Silver	Bronze	Total
1	Romania (ROU)	6	0	2	8
2	Russia (RUS)	3	3	1	7
3	Bulgaria (BUL)	2	0	1	3
4	United States (USA)	1	1	2	4
5	Belarus (BLR)	1	1	1	3
5	China (CHN)	1	1	1	3
7	Greece (GRE)	1	0	0	1
8	Ukraine (UKR)	0	1	2	3
9	Cuba (CUB)	0	1	1	2
9	Latvia (LAT)	0	1	1	2
11	Australia (AUS)	0	1	0	1
11	Brazil (BRA)	0	1	0	1
11	Hungary (HUN)	0	1	0	1
11	Netherlands (NED)	0	1	0	1
11	Uzbekistan (UZB)	0	1	0	1
16	Italy (ITA)	0	0	1	1
Totals (16 entries)		15	14	13	42

=== Men ===
Rank	Nation	Gold	Silver	Bronze	Total
1	Romania	3	0	0	3
2	Bulgaria	2	0	1	3
3	Belarus	1	1	1	3
4	China	1	1	0	2
4	United States	1	1	0	2
6	Greece	1	0	0	1
7	Ukraine	0	1	2	3
8	Cuba	0	1	1	2
8	Latvia	0	1	1	2
10	Australia	0	1	0	1
10	Hungary	0	1	0	1
12	Italy	0	0	1	1
Totals (12 entries)		9	8	7	24

=== Women ===
Rank	Nation	Gold	Silver	Bronze	Total
1	Russia	3	3	1	7
2	Romania	3	0	2	5
3	Brazil	0	1	0	1
3	Netherlands	0	1	0	1
3	Uzbekistan	0	1	0	1
6	United States	0	0	2	2
7	China	0	0	1	1
Totals (7 entries)		6	6	6	18

== Men ==
=== Team Final ===
Rank	Team	Floor (gymnastics)	Pommel horse	Rings (gymnastics)	Vault (gymnastics)	Parallel bars	Horizontal bar	Total
1st place, gold medalist(s)	Belarus	27.562	28.075	28.625	28.061	28.762	28.537	169.622
1st place, gold medalist(s)	Ivan Ivankov	-	9.275	9.700	-	9.725	9.600	169.622
1st place, gold medalist(s)	Dmitri Kasperovich	9.450	-	9.375	9.512	9.312	-	169.622
1st place, gold medalist(s)	Alexei Sinkevich	-	9.400	-	9.262	9.725	-	169.622
1st place, gold medalist(s)	Denis Savenkov	9.162	9.400	-	-	-	9.500	169.622
1st place, gold medalist(s)	Aleksandr Kruzhilov	8.950	-	-	9.287	-	9.437	169.622
1st place, gold medalist(s)	Vitali Kalinchuk	-	-	9.550	-	-	-	169.622
2nd place, silver medalist(s)	United States	26.974	26.924	28.062	28.175	27.849	28.861	166.845
2nd place, silver medalist(s)	Paul Hamm	8.925	8.412	9.350	9.425	-	9.737	166.845
2nd place, silver medalist(s)	Brett McClure	-	9.350	-	9.350	9.425	9.612	166.845
2nd place, silver medalist(s)	Sean Townsend	8.662	-	9.475	-	9.637	9.512	166.845
2nd place, silver medalist(s)	Raj Bhavsar	-	9.162	9.237	-	8.787	-	166.845
2nd place, silver medalist(s)	Stephen McCain	9.387	-	-	9.400	-	-	166.845
2nd place, silver medalist(s)	Guard Young	-	-	-	-	-	-	166.845
3rd place, bronze medalist(s)	Ukraine	26.962	27.712	27.049	27.674	27.412	28.674	165.483
3rd place, bronze medalist(s)	Alexander Beresch	8.662	-	9.475	-	9.637	9.512	165.483
3rd place, bronze medalist(s)	Ruslan Mezentsev	8.400	8.925	8.150	9.025	-	-	165.483
3rd place, bronze medalist(s)	Andrei Lipski	9.312	-	-	-	9.175	9.512	165.483
3rd place, bronze medalist(s)	Andrei Mikhailichenko	-	9.275	-	9.462	9.125	-	165.483
3rd place, bronze medalist(s)	Roman Zozulya	-	-	9.337	-	9.112	9.387	165.483
3rd place, bronze medalist(s)	Sergei Vyaltsev	-	-	9.562	-	-	-	165.483
4	France	26.974	28.211	27.112	27.637	27.775	27.574	165.283
4	Florent Marée	9.275	-	8.325	9.225	9.200	9.187	165.283
4	Cedric Guille	9.212	-	-	9.312	-	9.437	165.283
4	Yann Cucherat	-	-	-	9.100	9.350	8.950	165.283
4	Johan Mounard	8.487	9.312	-	-	9.225	-	165.283
4	François Ruffier	-	9.537	9.312	-	-	-	165.283
4	Sebastien Tayac	-	9.362	9.475	-	-	-	165.283
5	China	27.187	27.374	27.000	28.212	28.125	27.362	165.260
5	Feng Jing	9.050	8.362	8.625	-	9.525	9.537	165.260
5	Deng Weiwei	8.875	-	-	9.387	9.050	8.900	165.260
5	Liu Jinyu	-	-	9.125	9.400	-	8.925	165.260
5	Li Rongjie	9.262	8.200	-	9.425	-	-	165.260
5	Zhang Shangwu	-	-	9.250	-	9.550	-	165.260
5	Xiao Qin	-	9.812	-	-	-	-	165.260
6	Romania	26.911	28.311	27.624	28.650	25.162	26.262	162.920
6	Marian Drăgulescu	8.787	-	9.137	9.675	8.625	-	162.920
6	Dan Potra	9.212	9.312	9.500	-	7.925	-	162.920
6	Marius Urzică	-	9.762	-	-	8.612	9.500	162.920
6	Ioan Suciu	8.912	9.237	-	9.575	-	-	162.920
6	Rareș Orzața	-	-	-	9.400	-	9.437	162.920
6	Razvan Selariu	-	-	8.987	-	-	7.325	162.920
7	Russia	26.999	25.312	27.237	28.275	26.812	26.286	160.921
7	Alexei Bondarenko	8.487	-	8.562	9.450	8.925	8.537	160.921
7	Alexei Nemov	9.475	-	-	9.375	9.437	9.062	160.921
7	Gregory Grebenkov	9.037	8.425	9.200	-	-	8.687	160.921
7	Evgeny Krylov	-	-	9.475	9.450	-	-	160.921
7	Nikolai Kryukov	-	9.550	-	-	8.450	-	160.921
7	Yury Tikhonovsky	-	7.337	-	-	-	-	160.921
8	South Korea	25.600	27.862	18.687	28.149	26.662	26.962	153.922
8	Yang Tae-Young	8.775	8.775	9.212	9.587	9.125	9.187	153.922
8	Lee Jang-Hyung	8.300	9.437	-	9.412	-	8.850	153.922
8	You Won-Kil	8.525	-	9.475	9.150	8.837	-	153.922
8	Shing Hyung-Ook	-	9.650	-	-	8.700	8.925	153.922
8	Kim Dong-Hwa	-	-	-	-	-	-	153.922

=== All-around ===
Rank	Gymnast	Floor (gymnastics)	Pommel horse	Rings (gymnastics)	Vault (gymnastics)	Parallel bars	Horizontal bar	Total
1st place, gold medalist(s)	Feng Jing (CHN)	9.287	9.425	9.125	9.300	9.612	9.462	56.211
2nd place, silver medalist(s)	Ivan Ivankov (BLR)	9.000	8.825	9.612	9.400	9.687	9.600	56.124
3rd place, bronze medalist(s)	Yordan Yovchev (BUL)	9.687	8.837	9.787	9.337	9.150	9.287	56.085
4	Dan Potra (ROU)	9.412	9.550	9.575	9.325	9.112	8.925	55.899
5	Erick López (CUB)	8.562	9.087	9.687	9.462	9.687	9.237	55.722
6	Yernar Yerimbetov (KAZ)	8.937	9.200	9.125	9.587	9.387	9.350	55.586
7	Paul Hamm (USA)	9.425	9.312	9.362	9.337	9.112	8.787	55.335
8	Sean Townsend (USA)	9.687	8.862	9.437	9.387	9.650	8.250	55.273
9	Marian Drăgulescu (ROU)	9.637	9.550	9.175	9.762	7.775	9.325	55.224
10	Roman Zozulya (UKR)	9.312	8.725	9.350	8.950	9.187	9.425	54.949
11	Ioan Suciu (ROU)	9.425	9.650	8.787	9.637	8.500	8.625	54.624
12	Pavel Gofman (ISR)	8.975	9.150	9.062	9.150	8.950	9.150	54.437
13	Yang Tae-Young (KOR)	8.487	8.787	9.287	9.562	8.862	9.287	54.272
14	Johan Mounard (FRA)	9.025	9.287	8.637	9.187	9.112	8.975	54.223
15	Andrei Mikhailichenko (UKR)	9.025	9.300	8.575	9.462	9.075	8.525	53.962
16	Stephan Zapf (GER)	9.025	9.025	9.237	9.150	8.637	8.712	53.786
17	Igor Cassina (ITA)	8.537	8.725	8.762	9.237	8.562	9.437	53.260
18	Alexei Bondarenko (RUS)	9.675	8.312	9.150	9.212	8.237	8.637	53.223
19	Sven Kwiatkowski (GER)	8.412	9.312	8.375	9.162	8.825	9.075	53.161
20	Dominik Daeppen (SUI)	8.800	8.387	8.975	9.062	8.937	8.975	53.136
21	Charles Tamayo (CUB)	9.262	7.512	9.562	9.550	9.337	7.675	52.898
22	Grant Golding (CAN)	8.687	8.950	8.987	9.162	9.025	7.925	52.736
23	Liu Jinyu (CHN)	8.812	7.587	8.925	9.437	8.912	9.012	52.685
24	Florent Marée (FRA)	9.200	8.500	8.475	8.925	7.987	9.537	52.624
25	Victor Cano (ESP)	8.800	9.050	9.200	9.250	8.150	8.150	52.600
26	Roman Schweizer (SUI)	8.237	8.262	8.800	9.475	8.800	9.000	52.574
27	Abel Driggs Santos (CUB)	8.487	8.837	8.900	9.425	9.012	7.800	52.461
28	Stephen McCain (USA)	8.975	7.187	9.100	9.400	8.912	8.712	52.286
29	Matteo Morandi (ITA)	8.850	8.525	9.625	8.950	7.625	8.625	52.200
30	Erik Revelinsh (LAT)	8.500	8.387	8.825	8.837	8.237	9.187	51.973
31	Christoph Schaerer (SUI)	8.225	8.800	8.487	9.025	8.250	9.000	51.787

=== Floor Exercise ===
Rank	Gymnast	Total
1st place, gold medalist(s)	Marian Drăgulescu (ROU)	9.550
1st place, gold medalist(s)	Yordan Yovchev (BUL)	9.550
3rd place, bronze medalist(s)	Igors Vihrovs (LAT)	9.425
4	Stephen McCain (USA)	9.312
5	Jevgēņijs Saproņenko (LAT)	8.962
6	Alexei Bondarenko (RUS)	8.937
7	Yernar Yerimbetov (KAZ)	8.712
8	Alexander Beresh (UKR)	7.862

=== Pommel Horse ===
Rank	Gymnast	Total
1st place, gold medalist(s)	Marius Urzică (ROU)	9.800
2nd place, silver medalist(s)	Xiao Qin (CHN)	9.775
3rd place, bronze medalist(s)	Alexander Beresh (UKR)	9.662
4	Nikolai Kryukov (RUS)	9.650
5	Alberto Busnari (ITA)	9.562
6	François Ruffier (FRA)	8.987
7	Feng Jing (CHN)	8.837
8	Ioan Suciu (ROU)	8.775

=== Rings ===
Rank	Gymnast	Total
1st place, gold medalist(s)	Yordan Yovchev (BUL)	9.775
2nd place, silver medalist(s)	Szilveszter Csollány (HUN)	9.712
3rd place, bronze medalist(s)	Andrea Coppolino (ITA)	9.650
4	Demosthenes Tampakos (GRE)	9.600
5	Ivan Ivankov (BLR)	9.575
6	Walid el Deriny (EGY)	9.562
7	You Won-Kil (KOR)	9.500
8	Herodotos Giorgallas (CYP)	9.100

=== Vault ===
Rank	Gymnast	Total
1st place, gold medalist(s)	Marian Drăgulescu (ROU)	9.668
2nd place, silver medalist(s)	Jevgēņijs Saproņenko (LAT)	9.643
3rd place, bronze medalist(s)	Charles Tamayo (CUB)	9.624
4	Alexei Bondarenko (RUS)	9.456
5	Yernar Yerimbetov (KAZ)	9.450
6	Leszek Blanik (POL)	9.212
7	Tue Lodahl (DEN)	9.156
8	Igors Vihrovs (LAT)	9.075

=== Parallel Bars ===
Rank	Gymnast	Total
1st place, gold medalist(s)	Sean Townsend (USA)	9.700
2nd place, silver medalist(s)	Eric Lopez (CUB)	9.675
3rd place, bronze medalist(s)	Ivan Ivankov (BLR)	9.637
4	Feng Jing (CHN)	9.537
5	Alexei Sinkevich (BLR)	9.525
6	Zhang Shangwu (CHN)	9.512
7	Vasileios Tsolakidis (GRE)	9.500
8	Marius Urzică (ROU)	9.375

=== Horizontal Bar ===
Rank	Gymnast	Total
1st place, gold medalist(s)	Vlasios Maras (GRE)	9.737
2nd place, silver medalist(s)	Alexander Beresh (UKR)	9.725
2nd place, silver medalist(s)	Philippe Rizzo (AUS)	9.725
4	Igor Cassina (ITA)	9.550
5	Andrei Lipski (UKR)	9.525
6	Christoph Schaerer (SUI)	8.812
7	Jari Monkkonen (FIN)	8.737
8	Ivan Ivankov (BLR)	7.300

== Women ==
=== Team Final ===
Rank	Team	Vault (gymnastics)	Uneven bars	Balance beam	Floor (gymnastics)	Total
1st place, gold medalist(s)	Romania	28.061 (1)	25.874 (5)	28.462 (1)	27.812 (1)	110.209
1st place, gold medalist(s)	Andreea Răducan	9.425	8.525	9.675	9.562	110.209
1st place, gold medalist(s)	Sabina Cojocar	9.399	8.587		9.175	110.209
1st place, gold medalist(s)	Andreea Ulmeanu	9.237			9.075	110.209
1st place, gold medalist(s)	Silvia Stroescu		8.762	9.400		110.209
1st place, gold medalist(s)	Carmen Ionescu			9.387		110.209
1st place, gold medalist(s)	Loredana Boboc					110.209
2nd place, silver medalist(s)	Russia	27.024 (6)	27.325 (1)	27.487 (2)	27.187 (5)	109.023
2nd place, silver medalist(s)	Svetlana Khorkina	8.656	9.700	8.862	9.250	109.023
2nd place, silver medalist(s)	Natalia Ziganshina	9.056	8.400	9.175	8.950	109.023
2nd place, silver medalist(s)	Ludmila Ezhova		9.225	9.450	8.987	109.023
2nd place, silver medalist(s)	Maria Zasypkina	9.312				109.023
2nd place, silver medalist(s)	Elena Zamolodchikova					109.023
3rd place, bronze medalist(s)	United States	27.729 (2)	26.712 (2)	26.324 (3)	27.749 (2)	108.514
3rd place, bronze medalist(s)	Tasha Schwikert		9.087	9.237	9.350	108.514
3rd place, bronze medalist(s)	Ashley Miles	9.174	8.625		8.987	108.514
3rd place, bronze medalist(s)	Tabitha Yim			8.937	9.412	108.514
3rd place, bronze medalist(s)	Rachel Tidd	9.168		8.150		108.514
3rd place, bronze medalist(s)	Mohini Bhardwaj	9.387				108.514
3rd place, bronze medalist(s)	Katie Heenan		9.000			108.514
4	Spain	27.117 (4)	25.787 (6)	26.049 (4)	27.625 (3)	106.578
4	Sara Moro	9.043	8.950	9.262	9.200	106.578
4	Elena Gómez		8.237	9.062	9.500	106.578
4	Marta Cusidó	9.043			8.925	106.578
4	Esther Moya	9.031		7.725		106.578
4	Alba Planas		8.600			106.578
4	Ana Parera					106.578
5	Netherlands	27.286 (3)	26.249 (4)	25.674 (6)	27.286 (4)	106.495
5	Verona van de Leur	9.212	9.387	8.450	9.087	106.495
5	Gabriëlla Wammes	9.131	7.762	8.337	9.162	106.495
5	Rikst Valentijn			8.887	9.037	106.495
5	Renske Endel		9.100			106.495
5	Monique Nuijten	8.943				106.495
5	Kimberly Viola					106.495
6	Ukraine	26.817 (8)	26.262 (3)	25.975 (5)	25.262 (8)	104.316
6	Natalia Sirobaba	9.099	8.250	9.100	7.550	104.316
6	Alona Kvasha	8.981		8.625	9.012	104.316
6	Tatiana Yarosh	8.737	9.050		8.700	104.316
6	Irina Yarotska		8.962	8.250		104.316
6	Olga Roschupkina					104.316
6	Nataliya Horodniy					104.316
7	Australia	27.104 (5)	24.200 (8)	24.524 (8)	27.049 (6)	102.877
7	Allana Slater	9.037	9.000	7.525	9.437	102.877
7	Alexandra Croak	8.874		8.362	9.037	102.877
7	Jacqui Dunn		6.475	8.637		102.877
7	Allison Johnston	9.193				102.877
7	Jessica Zarnay		8.725			102.877
7	Kylie Tanner				8.575	102.877
8	Germany	26.825 (7)	25.074 (7)	25.437 (7)	25.512 (7)	102.848
8	Lisa Brüggemann	9.000	8.712	8.250	8.625	102.848
8	Birgit Schweigert	8.875	8.037	8.587	8.387	102.848
8	Gabi Weller	8.950				102.848
8	Katja Abel			8.600		102.848
8	Gritt Hofmann				8.500	102.848
8	Conny Schütz		8.325			102.848

=== All Around Final ===
Svetlana Khorkina won her second title, only the fifth female gymnast to achieve this feat. At age 22, she became the oldest women's all-around champion since Nellie Kim in 1979, the last time the event had been won by a gymnast in her 20s. Daniele Hypólito became the first Latin American gymnast to ever place in the top five.

As of 2026, this is the most recent Women's All Around final where none of the medals were won by an American gymnast.

Rank	Gymnast	Vault (gymnastics)	Uneven bars	Balance beam	Floor (gymnastics)	Total
1st place, gold medalist(s)	Svetlana Khorkina (RUS)	9.368	9.537	9.237	9.475	37.617
2nd place, silver medalist(s)	Natalia Ziganshina (RUS)	9.343	9.200	9.375	9.387	37.305
3rd place, bronze medalist(s)	Andreea Răducan (ROU)	9.350	8.862	9.475	9.262	36.949
4	Daniele Hypólito (BRA)	9.056	8.912	9.375	9.562	36.905
5	Tasha Schwikert (USA)	9.231	8.950	9.350	9.350	36.881
6	Sabina Cojocar (ROU)	9.356	8.625	9.337	9.462	36.780
7	Tabitha Yim (USA)	9.143	8.950	9.125	9.462	36.680
8	Sara Moro (ESP)	8.675	9.225	9.475	9.287	36.662
9	Verona van de Leur (NED)	9.093	9.400	8.550	9.350	36.393
10	Sun Xiaojiao (CHN)	8.868	8.875	9.487	9.062	36.292
11	Silvia Stroescu (ROU)	9.031	8.575	9.387	9.225	36.218
12	Marta Cusidó (ESP)	9.043	8.837	8.925	9.112	35.917
13	Gabriëlla Wammes (NED)	9.124	8.562	9.025	9.137	35.848
14	Holly Murdock (GBR)	8.918	8.750	8.862	9.012	35.524
15	Evgeniya Kuznetsova (BUL)	9.025	8.787	8.937	8.625	35.374
16	Kate Richardson (CAN)	8.968	8.662	8.687	8.975	35.292
17	Elena Gómez (ESP)	8.818	8.425	8.837	9.200	35.280
18	Mohini Bhardwaj (USA)	9.362	8.487	8.275	8.912	35.036
19	Oksana Chusovitina (UZB)	9.362	8.237	8.387	9.037	35.023
20	Alona Kvasha (UKR)	8.812	8.312	8.725	9.112	34.961
21	Olga Roschupkina (UKR)	8.731	8.662	9.075	8.487	34.955
22	Allana Slater (AUS)	8.868	9.050	8.212	8.812	34.942
23	Delphine Regease (FRA)	8.962	8.312	8.800	8.850	34.924
24	Elizabeth Tweddle (GBR)	8.918	8.937	8.362	8.675	34.892
25	Janerky de la Peña (CUB)	8.937	8.800	8.562	8.525	34.824
26	Ludmila Ezhova (RUS)	6.900	9.312	9.587	8.975	34.774
27	Birgit Schweigert (GER)	9.049	8.537	8.587	8.462	34.635
28	Rikst Valentijn (NED)	8.756	8.700	8.475	8.662	34.593
29	Jacqui Dunn (AUS)	8.737	8.837	8.387	8.325	34.286
30	Tatiana Zharganova (BLR)	8.449	8.137	8.787	8.550	33.923
31	Tatiana Yarosh (UKR)	8.562	7.762	8.175	8.950	33.449
32	Ashley Peckett (CAN)	8.718	8.550	7.125	8.850	33.243

=== Vault Final ===
Rank	Gymnast	Vault 1	Vault 2	Total
1st place, gold medalist(s)	Svetlana Khorkina (RUS)	9.350	9.475	9.412
2nd place, silver medalist(s)	Oksana Chusovitina (UZB)	9.287	9.412	9.349
3rd place, bronze medalist(s)	Andreea Răducan (ROU)	9.125	9.362	9.243
4	Jana Komrsková (CZE)	9.237	9.175	9.206
5	Andreea Ulmeanu (ROU)	9.287	8.950	9.118
6	Verona van de Leur (NED)	9.375	8.850	9.112
7	Mohini Bhardwaj (USA)	9.375	8.700	9.037
8	Ashley Miles (USA)	9.312	8.225	8.768

=== Uneven Bars Final ===
Rank	Gymnast	S.V.	Total
1st place, gold medalist(s)	Svetlana Khorkina (RUS)	9.8	9.437
2nd place, silver medalist(s)	Renske Endel (NED)	10.0	9.425
3rd place, bronze medalist(s)	Katie Heenan (USA)	9.8	9.212
4	Sara Moro (ESP)	9.8	8.850
5	Tatiana Zharganova (BLR)	9.8	8.825
6	Ludmila Ezhova (RUS)	9.9	8.625
6	Jacqui Dunn (AUS)	9.8	8.625
8	Verona van de Leur (NED)	9.4	8.412

=== Balance Beam Final ===
Rank	Gymnast	S.V.	Total
1st place, gold medalist(s)	Andreea Răducan (ROU)	10.0	9.662
2nd place, silver medalist(s)	Ludmila Ezhova (RUS)	10.0	9.650
3rd place, bronze medalist(s)	Sun Xiaojiao (CHN)	10.0	9.575
4	Sabina Cojocar (ROU)	9.9	9.475
5	Tasha Schwikert (USA)	9.9	9.350
6	Elena Gómez (ESP)	9.6	9.025
7	Esther Moya (ESP)	9.6	8.975
8	Rachel Tidd (USA)	9.5	8.375

=== Floor Exercise Final ===
Rank	Gymnast	S.V	pen.	Total
1st place, gold medalist(s)	Andreea Răducan (ROU)	9.9		9.550
2nd place, silver medalist(s)	Daniele Hypólito (BRA)	9.9		9.487
3rd place, bronze medalist(s)	Svetlana Khorkina (RUS)	9.8		9.375
4	Allana Slater (AUS)	9.9		9.337
5	Daiane dos Santos (BRA)	9.8		9.325
6	Tabitha Yim (USA)	9.7		9.187
7	Silvia Stroescu (ROU)	9.6		9.012
8	Tasha Schwikert (USA)	9.6	0.1	8.900
