= Gymnastics at the 2004 Summer Olympics – Men's artistic team all-around =

Men's artistic team all-around at the Games of the XXVIII Olympiad
- Venue: Olympic Indoor Hall
- Date: 14 – 16 August 2004
- Competitors: 72 from 12 nations

Medalists
1st place, gold medalist(s)		Takehiro Kashima, Hisashi Mizutori, Daisuke Nakano, Hiroyuki Tomita, Naoya Tsukahara and Isao Yoneda	Japan
2nd place, silver medalist(s)		Jason Gatson, Morgan Hamm, Paul Hamm, Brett McClure, Blaine Wilson and Guard Young	United States
3rd place, bronze medalist(s)		Marian Drăgulescu, Ilie Daniel Popescu, Dan Nicolae Potra, Răzvan Dorin Șelariu, Ioan Silviu Suciu and Marius Daniel Urzică	Romania

These are the results of the men's artistic team all-around competition, one of eight events for male competitors of the artistic gymnastics discipline contested in the gymnastics at the 2004 Summer Olympics in Athens. The qualification and final rounds took place on August 14 and August 16 at the Olympic Indoor Hall.

== Results ==
=== Qualification ===
Twelve national teams composed by six gymnasts competed in the team all-around event in the artistic gymnastics qualification round on August 14. The eight highest scoring teams advanced to the final on August 16.

=== Final ===
Rank	Team	Floor Exercise	Pommel Horse	Rings	Vault	Parallel Bars	Horizontal Bar	Total
Gold medal	Japan	28.311 (3)	29.075 (3)	29.124 (1)	28.837 (2)	29.012 (3)	29.462 (1)	173.821
Gold medal	Takehiro Kashima		9.750		9.600	9.737	9.825	38.912
Gold medal	Hisashi Mizutori			9.625				9.625
Gold medal	Daisuke Nakano	9.412						9.412
Gold medal	Hiroyuki Tomita		9.675	9.787	9.687	9.700	9.850	48.699
Gold medal	Naoya Tsukahara	9.312	9.650	9.712		9.575		38.249
Gold medal	Isao Yoneda	9.587			9.550		9.787	28.924
Silver medal	United States	29.137 (1)	29.050 (4)	28.237 (7)	28.599 (4)	29.274 (1)	28.636 (5)	172.933
Silver medal	Jason Gatson			9.125		9.825		18.950
Silver medal	Morgan Hamm	9.712	9.650		9.637		9.762	38.761
Silver medal	Paul Hamm	9.725	9.750		9.612	9.737	9.462	48.286
Silver medal	Brett McClure		9.650				9.412	19.062
Silver medal	Blaine Wilson			9.637		9.712		19.349
Silver medal	Guard Young	9.700		9.475	9.350			28.525
Bronze medal	Romania	28.724 (2)	29.249 (2)	28.962 (6)	29.025 (1)	28.462 (5)	27.962 (8)	172.384
Bronze medal	Marian Drăgulescu	9.562			9.825	9.200		28.587
Bronze medal	Ilie Daniel Popescu		9.687	9.650				19.337
Bronze medal	Daniel Nicolae Potra			9.587		9.537		19.124
Bronze medal	Răzvan Dorin Șelariu	9.475		9.725	9.525		8.912	37.637
Bronze medal	Ioan Silviu Suciu	9.687	9.737		9.675		9.275	38.374
Bronze medal	Marius Daniel Urzică		9.825			9.725	9.775	29.325
4	South Korea	28.137 (4)	28.637 (5)	29.099 (2)	28.562 (5)	28.737 (4)	28.675 (4)	171.847
4	Cho Seong-Min							
4	Kim Dae-Eun	8.862		9.712	9.562	9.525		37.661
4	Kim Dong-Hwa			9.750			9.575	19.325
4	Kim Seung-Il	9.600	9.600		9.425	9.525	9.575	47.725
4	Lee Sun-Sung		9.587				9.525	19.112
4	Yang Tae-Young	9.675	9.450	9.637	9.575	9.687		48.024
5	China	27.311 (7)	29.299 (1)	29.011 (5)	28.825 (3)	28.274 (7)	28.537 (7)	171.257
5	Huang Xu		9.675	9.712			9.687	29.074
5	Li Xiaopeng			9.662	9.700	9.812		29.174
5	Teng Haibin	8.662	9.762			8.737	9.125	36.286
5	Xiao Qin		9.862					9.862
5	Xing Aowei	9.087			9.400		9.725	28.212
5	Yang Wei	9.562		9.637	9.725	9.725		38.649
6	Russia	27.362 (6)	27.661 (7)	29.050 (4)	28.324 (7)	28.412 (6)	28.999 (2)	169.808
6	Aleksei Bondarenko		9.112		9.325	9.225	9.737	37.399
6	Maxim Deviatovski	9.325	9.512	9.625				28.462
6	Anton Golotsutskov	8.975			9.737			18.712
6	Georgi Grebenkov	9.062		9.675		9.662	9.512	37.911
6	Aleksei Nemov		9.037			9.525	9.750	28.312
6	Aleksander Safoshkin			9.750	9.262			19.012
7	Ukraine	27.661 (5)	26.049 (8)	29.062 (3)	27.849 (8)	29.061 (2)	28.562 (6)	168.244
7	Evgeni Bogonosyuk	9.512					9.450	18.962
7	Valeri Goncharov		8.412			9.787	9.737	27.936
7	Vadym Kuvakin			9.625	9.562			19.187
7	Ruslan Myezyentsev	9.612	8.100	9.712	9.362			36.786
7	Andrei Mykaylichenko				8.925	9.562	9.375	27.862
7	Roman Zozulya	8.537	9.537	9.725		9.712		37.511
8	Germany	26.512 (8)	27.762 (6)	28.024 (8)	28.362 (6)	28.012 (8)	28.700 (3)	167.372
8	Thomas Andergassen		9.625	9.237		9.225		28.087
8	Matthias Fahrig	8.400			9.562		9.225	27.187
8	Fabian Hambüchen	8.837			9.425	9.512	9.775	37.549
8	Robert Juckel		9.437	9.612			9.700	28.749
8	Sven Kwiatkowski				9.375	9.275		18.650
8	Sergei Pfeifer	9.275	8.700	9.175				27.150
