= Carmen Ionescu =

Carmen Ionescu may refer to:

- Carmen Ionescu (gymnast) (born 1985), retired Romanian artistic gymnast
- Carmen Ionesco (birth name Ionescu; born 1951), Canadian discus thrower and shot putter of Romanian descent
