= 2002 FIG Artistic Gymnastics World Cup final =

International gymnastics competition

The 2002 Artistic Gymnastics World Cup Final was held in Stuttgart, Germany in 2002. This was the third edition of the World Cup Final. From 2001 to 2002, a series of qualifying events were held, culminating in a final event, the World Cup Final. The different stages, sometimes referred to as World Cup Qualifiers, mostly served the purpose of awarding points to individual gymnasts and groups according to their placements. These points would be added up over the two-year period to qualify a limited number of athletes to the biennial World Cup Final event.

== Medal winners ==
Event	Gold	Silver	Bronze	Ref.
Men's floor exercise	(Romania) Marian Drăgulescu	(Canada) Kyle Shewfelt	(Bulgaria) Yordan Yovchev	
Men's pommel horse	(Romania) Marius Urzică	(Romania) Ioan Silviu Suciu	(China) Huang Xu	
Men's still rings	(Bulgaria) Yordan Yovchev	(Italy) Andrea Coppolino	(Hungary) Szilveszter Csollány (United States) Sean Townsend	
Men's vault	(China) Lu Bin	(Poland) Leszek Blanik	(Romania) Marian Drăgulescu	
Men's parallel bars	(China) Li Xiaopeng	(China) Huang Xu	(United States) Sean Townsend	
Men's horizontal bar	(Slovenia) Aljaž Pegan	(Australia) Philippe Rizzo	(Germany) Sven Kwiatkowski	
Women's vault	(Russia) Elena Zamolodchikova (Uzbekistan) Oksana Chusovitina	None awarded	(Netherlands) Verona van de Leur	
Women's uneven bars	(Romania) Oana Petrovschi	(Australia) Jacqui Dunn	(Netherlands) Verona van de Leur	
Women's balance beam	(China) Sun Xiaojiao	(Russia) Elena Zamolodchikova	(Uzbekistan) Oksana Chusovitina	
Women's floor exercise	(Netherlands) Verona van de Leur	(China) Zhang Nan	(Australia) Allana Slater	
