= Rachel Tidd =

American gymnast

- Full name: Rachel Michelle Tidd
- Born: May 20, 1984 (age 42) Escondido, California, U.S.
- Height: 5 ft 2 in (157 cm)

Gymnastics career
- Discipline: Women's artistic gymnastics
- Country represented: United States
- College team: Utah Gymnastics
- Club: Southern California Elite Gymnastics Academy
- Head coaches: Kathy Strate, Tim Garrison, Meredith Paulicivic
- Retired: 2006
Medal record
Women's artistic gymnastics
Representing the United States
World Championships
Bronze medal – third place	2001 Ghent	Team

Rachel Tidd (born May 20, 1984) is an American gymnast. She attended the 2001 World Gymnastics Championships where she received the bronze medal along with her team. She is an NCAA three time All American.

== Personal life ==
Rachel Tidd is one of 10 children born to Susan and Michael Tidd. Her siblings are Mikala, Samantha, Olivia, Ashley, Holly, Nicole, Steven, Taylor and Brian.

== Injury and retirement ==
Tidd originally developed back pain during the 2004-2005 holiday break. She originally had thought that the back pain was just spasms. Doctors did many tests and procedures and were unable to determine what was causing Tidd's pain. Rehabilitation therapy helped briefly and delayed Tidd's decision to retire from gymnastics. Tidd made the choice to accept a medical scholarship which would not allow her to return to an athletic scholarship and retired in 2006.

== NCAA Career Highlights ==
Event	Score	Vs.	Date
All-Around	39.675	Brigham Young	Mar. 19, 2004
Vault	10.0	Brigham Young	Mar. 19, 2004
Uneven Bars	9.95	Utah State	Feb. 27, 2004
	9.95	UCLA	Jan. 7, 2005
	9.95	Michigan	Jan. 28, 2005
	9.95	Brigham Young	Feb. 11, 2005
	9.95	NCAA Championships	Apr. 22, 2005
Beam	9.90	Nebraska	Jan. 16, 2004
	9.90	Brigham Young	Mar. 19, 2004
	9.90	Brigham Young	Mar. 26, 2005
Floor	9.925	Arizona State/Air Force	Feb. 20, 2004
