= Oksana Chusovitina =

Multinational artistic gymnast (born 1975)

- Оксана Чусовитина
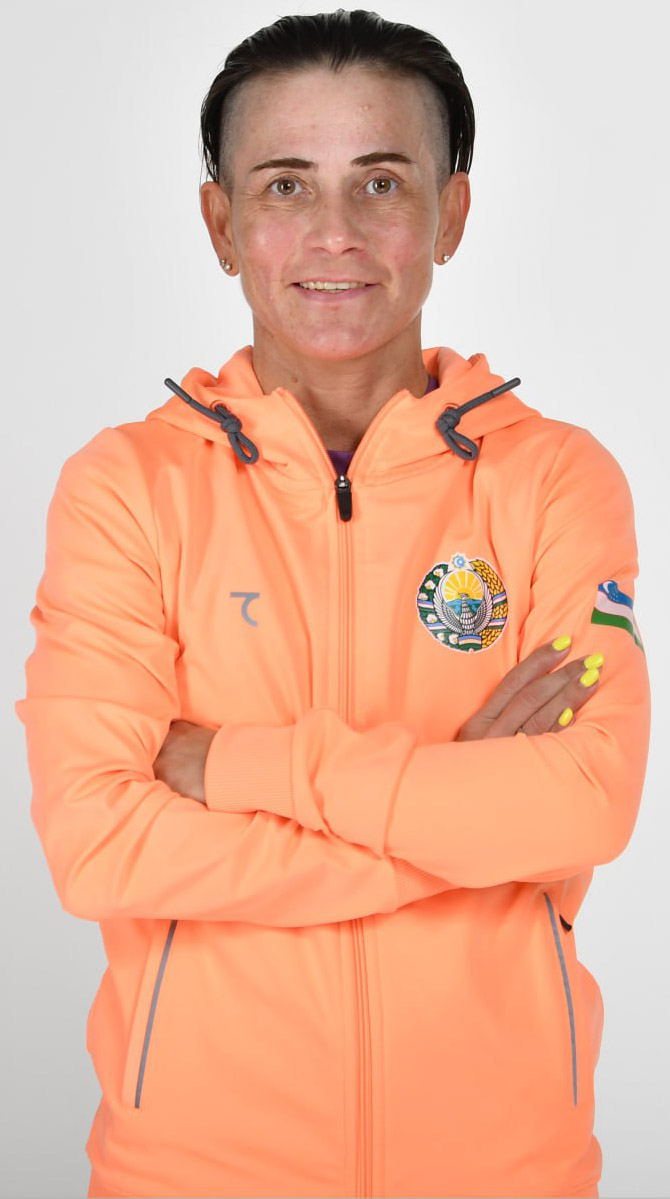
- Chusovitina in 2024

Personal information
- Full name: Oksana Aleksandrovna Chusovitina
- Born: 19 June 1975 (age 51) Bukhara, Uzbek SSR, Soviet Union
- Height: 1.53 m (5 ft 0 in)

Gymnastics career
- Discipline: Women's artistic gymnastics
- Country represented: Uzbekistan; (2013–present)
- Former countries represented: Germany (2006–2012); Uzbekistan (1993–2006); Unified Team (1992); CIS (1992); Soviet Union (until 1991)
- Club: Turnteam Toyota Köln
- Head coaches: Svetlana Boguinskaya (personal); Shanna Polyakova
- Former coach: Svetlana Kuznetsova
- Eponymous skills: Hop-full pirouette, full out dismount (uneven bars); layout-full out (floor exercise)
Medal record
Women's artistic gymnastics
Event	1st	2nd	3rd
Olympic Games	1	1	0
World Championships	3	4	4
World Cup Final	1	0	1
Asian Games	2	4	2
Asian Championships	0	4	1
European Championships	1	2	1
Islamic Solidarity Games	2	1	0
Total	10	16	9
Olympic Games
Representing Unified Team
Gold medal – first place	1992 Barcelona	Team
Representing Germany
Silver medal – second place	2008 Beijing	Vault
World Championships
Representing the Soviet Union
Gold medal – first place	1991 Indianapolis	Team
Gold medal – first place	1991 Indianapolis	Floor exercise
Silver medal – second place	1991 Indianapolis	Vault
Representing CIS
Bronze medal – third place	1992 Paris	Vault
Representing Uzbekistan
Gold medal – first place	2003 Anaheim	Vault
Silver medal – second place	2001 Ghent	Vault
Silver medal – second place	2005 Melbourne	Vault
Bronze medal – third place	1993 Birmingham	Vault
Bronze medal – third place	2002 Debrecen	Vault
Representing Germany
Silver medal – second place	2011 Tokyo	Vault
Bronze medal – third place	2006 Aarhus	Vault
Goodwill Games
Representing the Soviet Union
Gold medal – first place	1990 Seattle	Team
Gold medal – first place	1990 Seattle	Vault
Representing Uzbekistan
Silver medal – second place	2001 Brisbane	Vault
World Cup Final
Representing Uzbekistan
Gold medal – first place	2002 Stuttgart	Vault
Bronze medal – third place	2002 Stuttgart	Balance beam
Asian Games
Representing Uzbekistan
Gold medal – first place	2002 Busan	Vault
Gold medal – first place	2002 Busan	Floor exercise
Silver medal – second place	2002 Busan	All-around
Silver medal – second place	2002 Busan	Balance beam
Silver medal – second place	2014 Incheon	Vault
Silver medal – second place	2018 Jakarta	Vault
Bronze medal – third place	1994 Hiroshima	Vault
Bronze medal – third place	1994 Hiroshima	Uneven bars
Asian Championships
Representing Uzbekistan
Silver medal – second place	1996 Changsha	Vault
Silver medal – second place	1996 Changsha	Uneven bars
Silver medal – second place	1996 Changsha	Floor exercise
Silver medal – second place	2023 Singapore	Vault
Bronze medal – third place	1996 Changsha	All-around
Islamic Solidarity Games
Representing Uzbekistan
Gold medal – first place	2017 Baku	Vault
Gold medal – first place	2021 Konya	Vault
Silver medal – second place	2021 Konya	Team
European Championships
Representing Germany
Gold medal – first place	2008 Clermont	Vault
Silver medal – second place	2011 Berlin	Vault
Silver medal – second place	2012 Brussels	Vault
Bronze medal – third place	2007 Amsterdam	Vault

Oksana Aleksandrovna Chusovitina (Russian: Оксана Александровна Чусовитина; born 19 June 1975) is an Uzbekistani artistic gymnast who previously represented the Soviet Union and Germany.

Chusovitina's career as an elite gymnast has spanned more than three decades. She won the USSR Junior Nationals in 1988 and began competing at the international level in 1989 before many of her current rivals were even born. She is the only gymnast ever to compete in eight Olympic Games, and is one of only two female gymnasts to compete at the Olympics under three different national teams: the Unified Team in 1992; Uzbekistan in 1996, 2000, 2004, 2016 and 2020; and Germany in 2008 and 2012. She is one of the 18 Olympians and 6 female Olympians to participate in 8 different Olympics. Chusovitina's longevity and consistency as an elite gymnast is exceptionally unusual; the skillset and wear and tear typical of the sport mean elite female gymnasts have often retired in their early twenties and a gymnast in her late twenties would be considered a seasoned veteran.

Chusovitina has also competed in 16 World Championships, six Asian Games, and three Goodwill Games. Chusovitina holds the record for the most individual world championship medals in a single event (nine, on the vault). Chusovitina is one of the few female gymnasts to return to international competitions after becoming a mother. In 2017, she was inducted into the International Gymnastics Hall of Fame.

== Soviet Union ==
Chusovitina began gymnastics in 1982. In 1988, at the age of 13, she won the all-around title at the USSR National Championships in the junior division.

By 1990, Chusovitina was competing internationally and winning medals as a member of the Soviet team. She was the vault gold medalist at the 1990 Goodwill Games and nearly swept the 1990 World Sports Fair in Japan, winning the all-around and every event except the uneven bars. The following year, she won the floor exercise at the 1991 World Artistic Gymnastics Championships, tied with Cristina Bontaș, and placed second on the vault, tied with Henrietta Ónodi.

In 1992, Chusovitina competed at the Olympics with the Unified Team, where she shared in the team gold medal and placed seventh in the floor final. She also won her second World Championships vault medal, a bronze.

== Uzbekistan ==
After the 1992 Olympics, when the former Soviet gymnasts returned to their home republics, Chusovitina began competing for Uzbekistan and continued training with Uzbekistan head coach Svetlana Kuznetsova, also her personal coach. Conditions at the national training facility in Tashkent were far worse than the Soviet Round Lake training center, so Chusovitina practiced on antiquated, and in some cases, unsafe equipment. In spite of this setback, she was able to consistently produce world-class routines.

Chusovitina represented Uzbekistan from 1993 to 2006, and competed for them at the 1996, 2000, and 2004 Olympics, the 1994, 1998, and 2002 Asian Games, and the 1994 and 2001 Goodwill Games. During this era, she was the strongest gymnast on the Uzbekistan national team, earning more than 70 medals in international competitions and qualifying to the Olympics three times.

By 1996, at age 20, Chusovitina was considered an "older" gymnast; her changes in personal style and participation in professional meets to gain experience for international competition were assumed to be preparations for her retirement. She said in an interview that while she could not recommend a particular strategy to other "older" gymnasts in general, "if you really want to do it, you can do it at any age".

For her contributions to gymnastics, Chusovitina was granted the title of "Honored Athlete of the Republic of Uzbekistan" by the Uzbekistan Ministry of Cultural and Sports Affairs. In 2001, she was named as the first WAG (women's artistic gymnastics) representative to the International Gymnastics Federation (FIG)'s Athletes' Commission. In addition, Chusovitina graduated from the Sports University in Tashkent.

In late 1997, Chusovitina married Uzbek Olympic wrestler Bakhodir Kurbanov, whom she first met at the 1994 Asian Games in Hiroshima. The couple's son, Alisher, was born in November 1999.

== Germany ==
In 2002, Chusovitina's three year old son, Alisher, was diagnosed with acute lymphocytic leukemia (ALL). Seeking advanced medical treatment for their son, Chusovitina and her husband accepted an offer of help from Shanna and Peter Brüggemann, head coaches of the Toyota Cologne club, and moved to Germany. With prize money earned from gymnastics competitions, along with the help of the Brüggemanns and members of the international gymnastics community who fundraised and donated to the cause, Chusovitina was able to secure treatment for Alisher at the University of Cologne's hospital. While Alisher underwent treatment in Cologne, Chusovitina trained with the German team.

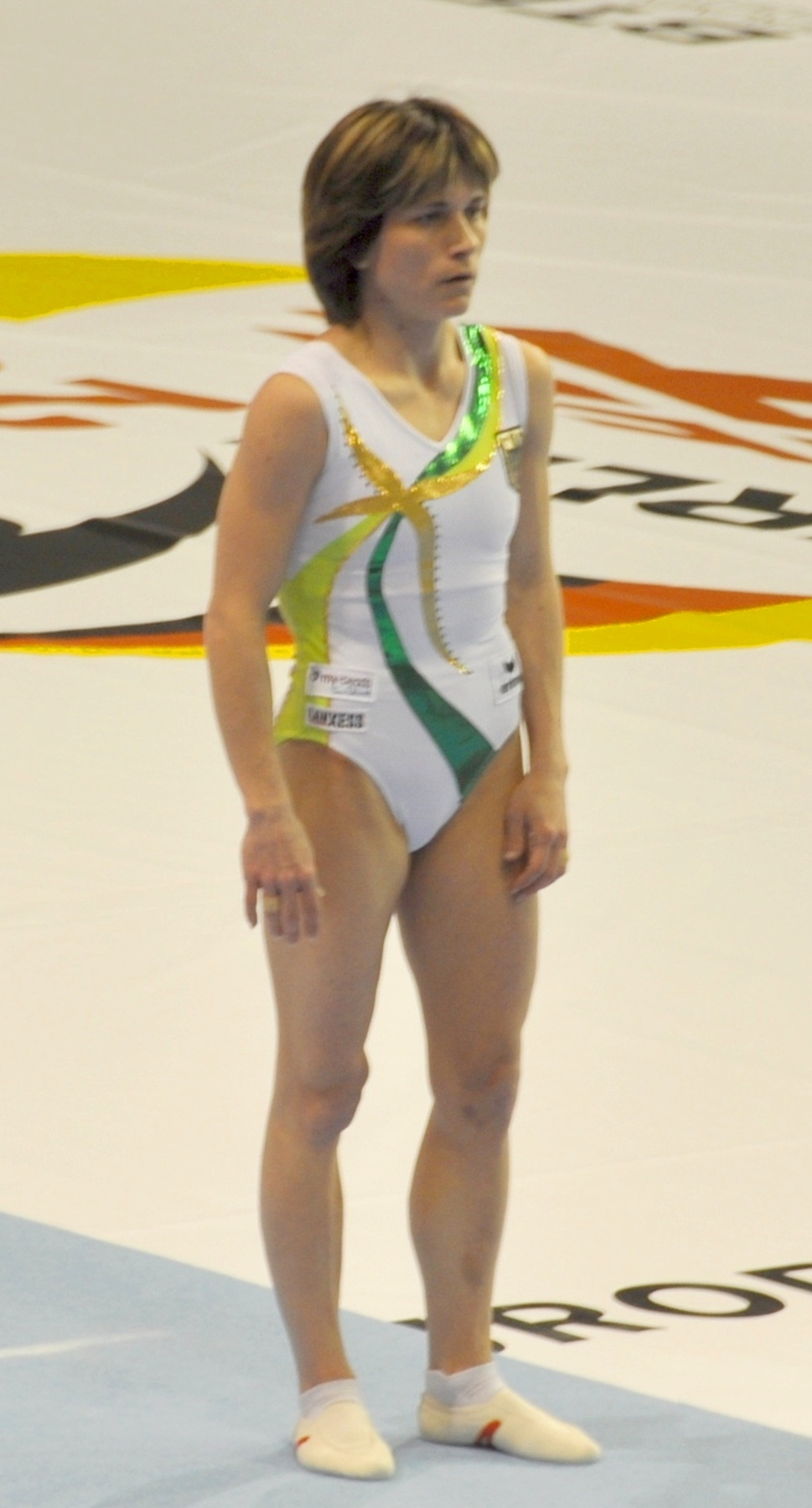
Oksana Chusovitina in 2011

Uzbekistan released Chusovitina to compete for Germany in 2003. However, due to rules requiring three years of residency, she was unable to gain German citizenship immediately. From 2003 to 2006 she trained in Germany but continued to compete for Uzbekistan, representing her native country at the 2003 and 2005 World Championships and the 2004 Olympics. In 2003, 12 years after her world championships debut, Chusovitina won the gold medal on the vault at that year's world championships in Anaheim.

In 2006, Chusovitina obtained German citizenship. Her first competition for Germany was the 2006 World Championships, where she won a bronze medal on the vault and placed ninth in the all-around.

In July 2007, she won the all-around title at the 2007 German National Championships. At her first European Championships, she placed second on the vault. At the 2007 World Championships in Stuttgart, Chusovitina helped the German squad to a 10th-place finish in the preliminary round, which qualified them to send a full team to the 2008 Olympics in Beijing, where she was the oldest female competitor in her discipline. She qualified for the vault event final where she finished in 2nd place, thus earning the first individual Olympic medal of her career. Chusovitina competed on three events at the 2008 Women's European Championships in Clermont-Ferrand, France, helping the German team to a seventh-place finish in the team finals. In the vault event final, she defeated reigning European champion Carlotta Giovannini to win the gold medal.

At the 2008 Olympics, the German team placed 12th in the qualifying round of competition. Chusovitina qualified to the individual all-around final, where she placed ninth overall. She also qualified in fourth place for the vault final. In the vault final, she won the silver medal with a score of 15.575.

Despite earlier claims that she would attempt to compete in the London 2012 Summer Olympics, Chusovitina announced in April 2009 that she intended to only participate in the 2009 World Gymnastics Championships in October, and that she would not continue. The championships, she stated, are "enough."

However, she returned to compete in some competitions in 2010 (including the 2010 Houston National Invitational). She won the silver medal on vault at the 2011 European Championships, the 2011 World Championships and the 2012 European Championships.

Chusovitina competed at the 2012 Summer Olympics for Germany. The games were a remarkable sixth Olympics for Chusovitina, who qualified for the vault final where she placed in fifth behind her German teammate, Janine Berger. Afterward Chusovitina declared she would retire as a gymnast and concentrate on coaching.

However, instead of retiring, Chusovitina switched back to competing for Uzbekistan. She competed at the 2016 and 2020 Olympics. She has stated her goal is to win an Olympic medal on vault for Uzbekistan, because she’s already won medals for the Unified Team and Germany, but not for her home country.

== Recent years ==
Despite her statements about retirement in 2012, Chusovitina returned to gymnastics the following year and announced plans to continue competing through the Rio 2016 Summer Olympics. In April 2016, she qualified an individual place for Uzbekistan at a qualifying event in Rio de Janeiro. Upon competing in Rio, she set a record as the oldest gymnast to ever compete at the Olympic Games at the age of 41 and 2 months. She also became the first and only gymnast to compete in seven consecutive Olympiads, surpassing the record of six she set in 2012 with Yordan Yovchev of Bulgaria. Following the 2016 Olympics, Chusovitina announced that she intended to compete in the 2020 Olympics in Tokyo.

In 2017, she was elected to serve once again as the WAG athlete representative for the FIG athlete's commission, serving through 2021.

After competing solely on vault for several years, Chusovitina announced in 2018 that she would begin competing all-around again.

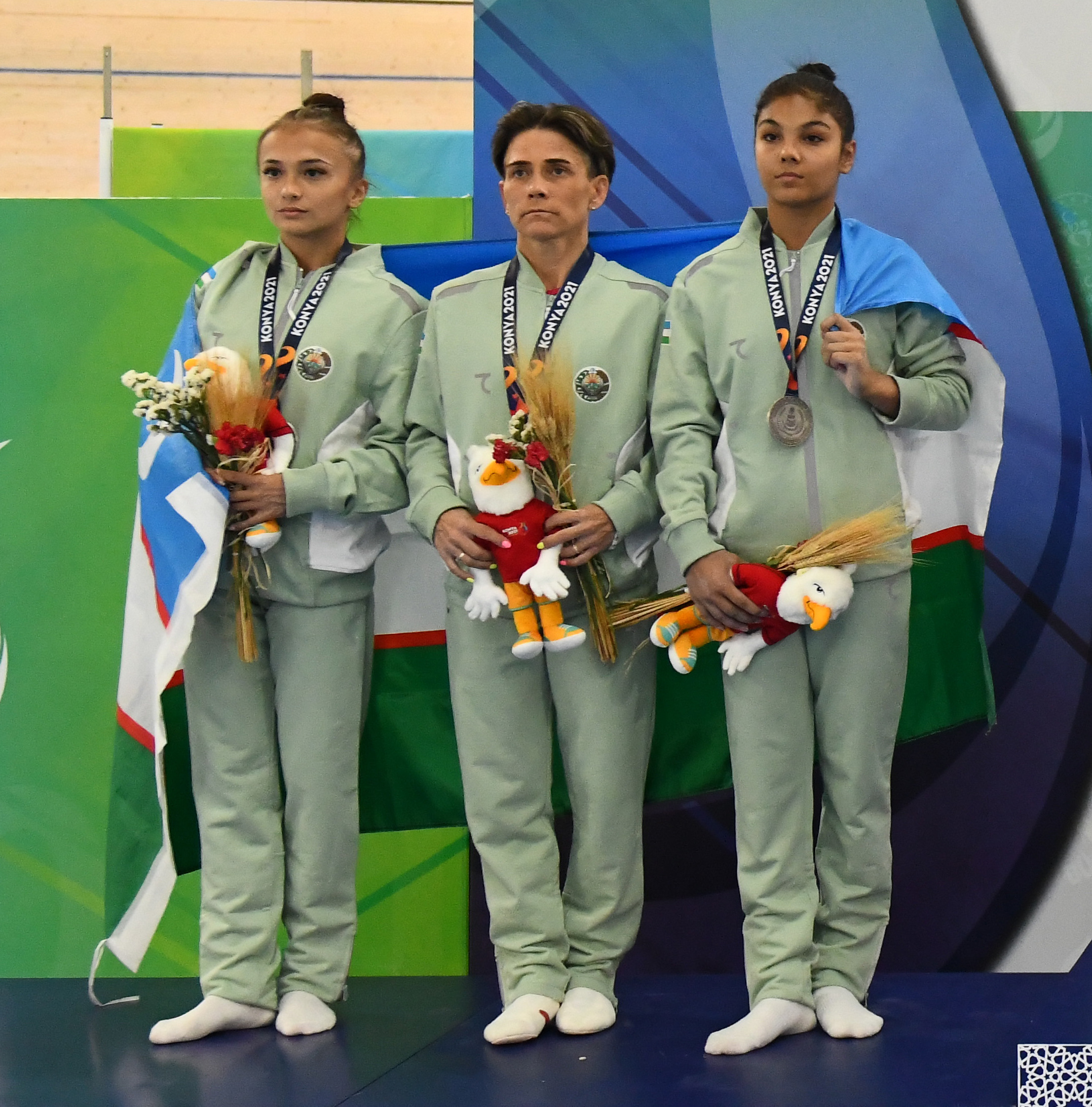
Chusovitina (center) and team Uzbekistan at the 2021 Islamic Solidarity Games

Chusovitina competed at the 2019 World Artistic Gymnastics Championships in order to qualify for Tokyo. During qualifications, she fell on her second vault and on balance beam. Despite these errors, she ranked high enough in the all-around standings to secure one of the last all-around berths to the Olympics from that event. She was selected as a flag bearer for Uzbekistan at the 2020 Summer Olympics opening ceremony, but was replaced just few hours before the ceremony. She then went on to compete in the vault finals, though she didn’t place.

Despite initially stating that she would retire following the delayed 2020 Olympic Games, Chusovitina later stated she would return to training for the 2022 Asian Games, which was postponed indefinitely due to the COVID-19 pandemic. She then won a gold medal on vault at 2022 Doha World Cup Event and the 2022 Uzbekistan National Championships. When asked how the postponement of the Asian games would influence her training plans, she stated that her goal was to continue training and compete in the 2024 Olympic Games in Paris, France. Chusovitina competed at the postponed Islamic Solidarity Games in 2022 alongside Dildora Aripova and Ominakhon Khalilova. They finished second as a team behind Turkey. Chusovitina won gold on vault. Having medaled in three of four World Cups in 2022, Chusovitina earned the World Cup series title on Vault, a feat she repeated in 2023. In March 2024, she competed in two World Cup championships, first placing 23rd on vault, which disqualified her from being selected as an apparatus specialist for the 2024 Olympics, meaning she would have to qualify through her all-around score at the Asian Gymnastics Championships in late May. Later in the month, she placed second on vault behind Tjaša Kysselef. In April, she claimed the Uzbekistan national title in the all-around competition. On 23 May, Chusovitina announced she was withdrawing from competition following an injury that occurred during training.

In March 2024, Chusovitina "opened a combination school and gymnastics academy in Tashkent ... that she said is free for children."

In 2026, Chusovitina made headlines after making the finals of the 2026 Asian Games at the age of 51. She announced her intention to try to qualify for the 2028 Summer Olympics

== Eponymous skills ==
Chusovitina has five eponymous skills in the Code of Points.

Apparatus	Name	Description	Difficulty (Note: Valid for the 2025–2028 Code of Points)
Vault	Chusovitina	Handspring forward on - piked salto forward with 1/1 turn (360°) off	4.4
Vault	Chusovitina (Note: Also referred to as a Rudi)	Handspring forward on - stretched salto forward with 1½ turn (540°) off	5.4
Uneven bars	Chusovitina	Giant circle backward to handstand with hop 1/1 turn (360°) in handstand phase	D (0.4)
Uneven bars	Chusovitina	Swing forward to double salto backward tucked with 1/1 turn (360°) in second salto	D (0.4)
Floor exercise	Chusovitina-Touzhikova	Double salto backward stretched with 1/1 turn (360°)	H (0.8)

== Competitive history ==
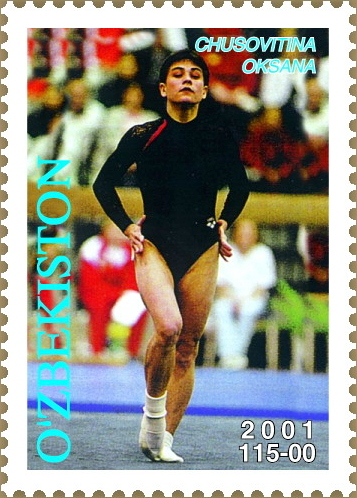
Chusovitina on a 2001 Uzbek stamp

Competitive history of Oksana Chusovitina
Year	Event	Team	AA	VT	UB	BB	FX
1988	USSR Championships (junior)		1st place, gold medalist(s)				
1989	Cottbus International		9				2nd place, silver medalist(s)
1990	Goodwill Games	1st place, gold medalist(s)		1st place, gold medalist(s)			
1990	World Sports Fair		1st place, gold medalist(s)	1st place, gold medalist(s)		1st place, gold medalist(s)	1st place, gold medalist(s)
1990	USSR Cup			1st place, gold medalist(s)			1st place, gold medalist(s)
1990	USSR Championships		6				
1991
1991	World Championships	1st place, gold medalist(s)		2nd place, silver medalist(s)			1st place, gold medalist(s)
1991	Chunichi Cup		8				
1991	USSR Championships		4				
1991	Blume Memorial		8				
1992	World Stars		15	1st place, gold medalist(s)	3rd place, bronze medalist(s)	2nd place, silver medalist(s)	
1992	World Championships			3rd place, bronze medalist(s)			7
1992	Olympic Games	1st place, gold medalist(s)					7
1993	DTB Cup			4	2nd place, silver medalist(s)	3rd place, bronze medalist(s)	1st place, gold medalist(s)
1993	Kosice International		2nd place, silver medalist(s)				
1993	Massilia Gym Cup		2nd place, silver medalist(s)				
1993	World Championships		18	3rd place, bronze medalist(s)	8		
1994	Swiss Cup			3rd place, bronze medalist(s)	6	1st place, gold medalist(s)	5
1994	Goodwill Games		5	5	5		4
1994	Asian Games		4	3rd place, bronze medalist(s)	3rd place, bronze medalist(s)	4	
1995	Cottbus International			5	2nd place, silver medalist(s)	5	5
1995	DTB Cup			4	2nd place, silver medalist(s)	5	4
1995	World Championships		19	6			
1995	Arthur Gander Memorial		3rd place, bronze medalist(s)				
1995	Swiss Cup			2nd place, silver medalist(s)	3rd place, bronze medalist(s)	2nd place, silver medalist(s)	1st place, gold medalist(s)
1996	American Cup		3rd place, bronze medalist(s)				
1996	International Mixed Pairs	2nd place, silver medalist(s)					
1996	Cottbus International			4	5	7	1st place, gold medalist(s)
1996	DTB Cup			1st place, gold medalist(s)	4	4	1st place, gold medalist(s)
1996	Arthur Gander Memorial		3rd place, bronze medalist(s)				
1996	Swiss Cup			1st place, gold medalist(s)	2nd place, silver medalist(s)	3rd place, bronze medalist(s)	1st place, gold medalist(s)
1996	Olympic Games		10				
1997	American Cup		4				
1997	World Stars			2nd place, silver medalist(s)	3rd place, bronze medalist(s)	3rd place, bronze medalist(s)	6
1997	Cottbus International			2nd place, silver medalist(s)	1st place, gold medalist(s)	1st place, gold medalist(s)	1st place, gold medalist(s)
1998
1998	Asian Games	4		8			6
1998	Arthur Gander Memorial		1st place, gold medalist(s)				
2000	DTB Cup			4		2nd place, silver medalist(s)	4
2000	Olympic Games		45	25			
2001	World Stars			2nd place, silver medalist(s)	2nd place, silver medalist(s)	2nd place, silver medalist(s)	3rd place, bronze medalist(s)
2001	Cottbus World Cup			2nd place, silver medalist(s)			5
2001	DTB Cup			2nd place, silver medalist(s)	7	4	1st place, gold medalist(s)
2001	Arthur Gander Memorial		1st place, gold medalist(s)				
2001	Goodwill Games		4	2nd place, silver medalist(s)	1st place, gold medalist(s)		2nd place, silver medalist(s)
2001	World Championships		19	2nd place, silver medalist(s)			
2002	American Cup		4				
2002	WOGA Classic		1st place, gold medalist(s)	1st place, gold medalist(s)	2nd place, silver medalist(s)	1st place, gold medalist(s)	2nd place, silver medalist(s)
2002	Cottbus World Cup			1st place, gold medalist(s)	5		6
2002	Arthur Gander Memorial		2nd place, silver medalist(s)				
2002	Asian Games	5	2nd place, silver medalist(s)	1st place, gold medalist(s)	4	2nd place, silver medalist(s)	1st place, gold medalist(s)
2002	World Championships			3rd place, bronze medalist(s)		8	6
2002	World Cup Final			1st place, gold medalist(s)	5	3rd place, bronze medalist(s)	4
2003	Cottbus World Cup			1st place, gold medalist(s)	4	4	5
2003	DTB Cup			2nd place, silver medalist(s)		6	6
2003	Arthur Gander Memorial		3rd place, bronze medalist(s)				
2003	Swiss Cup		2nd place, silver medalist(s)				
2003	World Championships			1st place, gold medalist(s)			
2004	Cottbus World Cup			1st place, gold medalist(s)			6
2004	Olympic Games			23			
2005	Glasgow World Cup			1st place, gold medalist(s)	7	6	
2005	São Paulo World Cup			1st place, gold medalist(s)	7	5	
2005	World Championships	—N/a		2nd place, silver medalist(s)			
2006	Arthur Gander Memorial		3rd place, bronze medalist(s)				
2006	Stuttgart World Cup			2nd place, silver medalist(s)	3rd place, bronze medalist(s)		
2006	Moscow World Cup			1st place, gold medalist(s)		3rd place, bronze medalist(s)	
2006	Ghent World Cup			1st place, gold medalist(s)	4	5	
2006	Cottbus World Cup			2nd place, silver medalist(s)			
2006	World Championships		9	3rd place, bronze medalist(s)			
2006	Swiss Cup		1st place, gold medalist(s)				
2007
2007	European Championships		6	2nd place, silver medalist(s)			6
2007	German Championships		1st place, gold medalist(s)				
2007	World Championships			6			
2007	Stuttgart World Cup			1st place, gold medalist(s)			
2007	Moscow World Cup			1st place, gold medalist(s)			
2007	Cottbus World Cup			1st place, gold medalist(s)			
2007	Swiss Cup		2nd place, silver medalist(s)				
2008
2008	European Championships	7		1st place, gold medalist(s)			6
2008	German Championships		1st place, gold medalist(s)				
2008	Doha World Cup			1st place, gold medalist(s)			6
2008	Cottbus World Cup			1st place, gold medalist(s)		3rd place, bronze medalist(s)	
2008	Olympic Games		9	2nd place, silver medalist(s)			
2010	Cottbus World Cup			1st place, gold medalist(s)			
2010	Moscow World Cup			2nd place, silver medalist(s)		3rd place, bronze medalist(s)	
2010	European Championships			12			
2010	SUI-GER-ROU Friendly	2nd place, silver medalist(s)					
2010	World Championships						
2011	Cottbus World Cup			1st place, gold medalist(s)			
2011	SUI-GER-ROU Friendly	2nd place, silver medalist(s)					
2011	European Championships			2nd place, silver medalist(s)			
2011	World Championships	6		2nd place, silver medalist(s)			
2012	German Championships		16	2nd place, silver medalist(s)		1st place, gold medalist(s)	
2012	European Championships	8		2nd place, silver medalist(s)			
2012	Olympic Games			5			
2012	Stuttgart World Cup	3rd place, bronze medalist(s)					
2012	Toyota International			4		6	4
2012	GER-GBR-ROU Friendly	2nd place, silver medalist(s)					
2013	Internationaux de France			3rd place, bronze medalist(s)			
2013	La Roche-sur-Yon World Cup			1st place, gold medalist(s)			
2013	Cottbus World Cup			1st place, gold medalist(s)			
2013	Gym Festival Trnava		1st place, gold medalist(s)	1st place, gold medalist(s)		2nd place, silver medalist(s)	
2013	Anadia World Cup			2nd place, silver medalist(s)			
2013	World Championships	—N/a		5			
2013	Mexican Open		3rd place, bronze medalist(s)				
2014
2014	Asian Games	5		2nd place, silver medalist(s)			
2014	Joaquin Blume Memorial		5				
2014	Mexican Open		3rd place, bronze medalist(s)	1st place, gold medalist(s)	8	4	4
2015	Houston National Invitational		2nd place, silver medalist(s)	1st place, gold medalist(s)	2nd place, silver medalist(s)		
2015	Cottbus World Cup			1st place, gold medalist(s)			
2015	Ljubljana World Cup			1st place, gold medalist(s)			
2015	Varna World Cup			1st place, gold medalist(s)	8	4	
2015	World Championships			13			
2015	Toyota International			7	5	6	
2016	Houston National Invitational		2nd place, silver medalist(s)	1st place, gold medalist(s)			
2016	WOGA Classic			3rd place, bronze medalist(s)			
2016	Baku World Challenge Cup			1st place, gold medalist(s)		8	
2016	Cottbus World Challenge Cup			1st place, gold medalist(s)	6	4	
2016	Olympic Test Event		45	2nd place, silver medalist(s)			
2016	Mersin World Challenge Cup			1st place, gold medalist(s)	4	2nd place, silver medalist(s)	
2016	Olympic Games			7			
2016	2nd Bundesliga (3rd League)		1st place, gold medalist(s)	1st place, gold medalist(s)	5	1st place, gold medalist(s)	1st place, gold medalist(s)
2016	Mexican Open		3rd place, bronze medalist(s)	1st place, gold medalist(s)			
2017	International Gymnix			2nd place, silver medalist(s)		6	
2017	Baku World Cup			1st place, gold medalist(s)			
2017	Doha World Cup			1st place, gold medalist(s)			8
2017	Islamic Solidarity Games			1st place, gold medalist(s)			5
2017	Szombathely Challenge Cup			6			
2017	Paris Challenge Cup			4			
2017	World Championships	—N/a		5			
2017	2nd Bundesliga (2nd League)			1st place, gold medalist(s)		2nd place, silver medalist(s)	1st place, gold medalist(s)
2017	Cottbus World Cup			1st place, gold medalist(s)			
2017	Voronin Cup			1st place, gold medalist(s)			
2018	Houston National Invitational		1st place, gold medalist(s)	1st place, gold medalist(s)		2nd place, silver medalist(s)	1st place, gold medalist(s)
2018	Baku World Cup			1st place, gold medalist(s)		3rd place, bronze medalist(s)	
2018	Doha World Cup			1st place, gold medalist(s)			
2018	Osijek Challenge Cup			1st place, gold medalist(s)			
2018	Asian Games			2nd place, silver medalist(s)			
2018	Paris Challenge Cup			1st place, gold medalist(s)			
2018	World Championships			4			
2018	Arthur Gander Memorial			1st place, gold medalist(s)			8
2018	Swiss Cup	5					
2018	Cottbus World Cup			5			
2019	Melbourne World Cup			2nd place, silver medalist(s)		8	
2019	Baku World Cup			2nd place, silver medalist(s)			
2019	Doha World Cup			5			
2019	Zhaoqing Challenge Cup			2nd place, silver medalist(s)			
2019	Korea Cup			2nd place, silver medalist(s)		4	
2019	Paris Challenge Cup			1st place, gold medalist(s)			
2019	World Championships			12			
2021	Varna Challenge Cup			3rd place, bronze medalist(s)			
2021	Doha World Cup			1st place, gold medalist(s)			
2021	Olympic Games			14			
2022	Doha World Cup			1st place, gold medalist(s)			
2022	Cairo World Cup			2nd place, silver medalist(s)			
2022	Baku World Cup			1st place, gold medalist(s)			
2022	Asian Championships	6		5			
2022	Islamic Solidarity Games	2nd place, silver medalist(s)		1st place, gold medalist(s)		9	
2023	Cottbus World Cup			3rd place, bronze medalist(s)			
2023	Doha World Cup			3rd place, bronze medalist(s)			
2023	Baku World Cup			2nd place, silver medalist(s)			
2023	Cairo World Cup			8			
2023	Asian Championships	7	16	2nd place, silver medalist(s)			
2023	Mersin Challenge Cup			1st place, gold medalist(s)			
2023	Asian Games			4			
2024	Cottbus World Cup			6			
2024	Antalya Challenge Cup			2nd place, silver medalist(s)			
2024	Doha World Cup			5			
2025	Cottbus World Cup			3rd place, bronze medalist(s)			
2025	Baku World Cup			1st place, gold medalist(s)			
2025	Antalya World Cup			5			
2025	Doha World Cup			6			
2025	Cairo World Cup			6			
2025	Asian Championships			DNF			
2025	Tashkent World Challenge Cup			2nd place, silver medalist(s)			
2026	Cottbus World Cup			7			
2026	Baku World Cup			7			
2026	Antalya World Cup			4			
2026	Tashkent World Challenge Cup			4			
2026	Asian Championships	6		8			
2026	Asian Games			5			

== Floor music ==
Year	Music Title
1996–2000	Phantom of the Opera
2006, 2008	Pirates of the Caribbean
2007	The Godfather Theme

== See also ==
- List of top medalists at the World Artistic Gymnastics Championships
- List of Olympic female artistic gymnasts for Uzbekistan
- List of Olympic female artistic gymnasts for Germany
- List of female artistic gymnasts with the most appearances at Olympic Games
- List of athletes with the most appearances at Olympic Games
- Nationality changes in gymnastics
