= Zhang Shangwu =

Chinese gymnast

- Born: 14 November 1983 (age 42) Baoding, Hebei, China
- Height: 1.54 m (5 ft 1 in)

Gymnastics career
- Country represented: (1995–2005 (CHN))
- Retired: 2005
Medal record
Representing China
Men's Artistic Gymnastics
Universiade
Gold medal – first place	2001 Beijing	Rings
Gold medal – first place	2001 Beijing	Team

Zhang Shangwu (Chinese: 张尚武; pinyin: Zhāng Shàngwǔ; born: 14 November 1983) is a Chinese former artistic gymnast and member of the national gymnastics team. He gained much attention in the 2010s after it was discovered that his life had turned to stealing and begging on the streets.

== Gymnastics career ==
=== Junior career ===
In 1988, five-year-old Zhang Shangwu entered the amateur sports school in Baoding, Hebei, after his family was convinced that sports would open opportunities for him. In 1995, at the age of 12, he was selected to become a member of the national gymnastics team.

=== Senior career ===
Zhang made his international debut at the 2001 Summer Universiade in Beijing, where he was able to win gold medals in rings and in the team event. Zhang, though was less than 18 years old at the time, not a college student, and thus, in order to participate in the competition, the leadership let him pretend to be a freshman at Beijing Sports University. In response to media questions about academic qualifications, the national gymnastics team responded that Zhang, a student at Beijing Sports University, was later dealt with by the national team for serious disciplinary violations. Later the same year, he competed in the 35th World Artistic Gymnastics Championships in Ghent, Belgium. Zhang finished sixth in the parallel bars event with a score of 9.550 and ninth in rings with a score of 9.220.

In early 2002, Zhang ruptured his Achilles tendon in both legs during training. He was forced by his coach to continue practicing, but was ultimately taken off the team for the 2004 Summer Olympics. After ten months of rest, he decided to return to the Hebei provincial team in 2003. Zhang hoped to enter a sports school as a way to retire from competitive gymnastics, but his requests were denied by sports officials and his coach. In June 2005, at the age of 21, he voluntarily retired from competition after receiving compensation and old-age insurance payments totaling RMB 38,000.

== Life in the streets ==
Zhang returned to his hometown after retiring. He was a caregiver for only about a month because of back pain from his training. He was a restaurant waiter but was often ridiculed by the staff because of his height. Due to desperation, he resorted to stealing, and in early 2007, he was arrested by Tianjin police for theft and sentenced to two months in prison. After being released, Zhang moved to Beijing to wander the streets and internet cafés. In July, he stole laptops, mobile phones, and cash from an athlete's apartment at the Beijing Sports University. The Criminal Investigation Branch of the Beijing Xuanwu Public Security Bureau managed to obtain camera footage of the crime, and Zhang was sentenced to prison for three years and ten months.

=== Public discovery ===
After being released from prison in May 2011, he stayed in Beijing to beg. He would perform handstands for commuters and display photos and medals from his competitive years, and ended up selling one of his Universiade gold medals for 150 RMB.

In July of the same year, a user posted a video on Sina Weibo showing Zhang begging in a public area then getting expelled by the police. After Zhang Shangwu's situation caught the attention of the general public in China as well as western media, many people were quick to reach out for help as well as criticize the sports system in China. Chen Guangbiao, a philanthropist, welcomed Zhang to work in his company in Nanjing. Subsequently, on 28 July 2011, Zhang was officially hired as "Deputy Minister of Public Welfare of Love" and "Ambassador Spokesperson of Public Interest Image" of Jiangsu Huangpu Renewable Resources Utilization Co., Ltd., with a monthly salary of more than 11,000 RMB in addition to an 80,000 RMB bailout. After working for Chen for about three months, he resigned due to disputed issues. Some stated that it was because he felt he was used as a publicity figure for Chen and others stated that it was because of incidents where he was mocked by others for his high salary.

Zhang moved to Shanghai in 2019 and was later jailed for a third time for pick-pocketing in July of that year. After being released from prison in March 2020, he announced on social media the creation of a charity, the "Bird's Nest Project", which aimed to donate 20,000 masks to health workers in their fight against the COVID-19 pandemic. With little success from the charity, he returned to perform on the streets and continues to do so today.
