= Johan Mounard =

French gymnast

- Born: 14 June 1979 (age 47) Lyon, France
- Height: 1.72 m (5 ft 8 in)

Gymnastics career
- Discipline: Men's artistic gymnastics
- Country represented: France
- Gym: Convention Gymnique de Lyon
Medal record
Men's artistic gymnastics
Representing France
Mediterranean Games
Gold medal – first place	2001 Tunis	Team

Johan Mounard (born 14 June 1979) is a French gymnast. He competed at the 2004 Summer Olympics.
