= Andreea Ulmeanu =

Romanian gymnast

Andrea Ulmeanu
- Born: 15 May 1984 (age 42) Timișoara

Gymnastics career
- Discipline: Women's artistic gymnastics
- Country represented: Romania
- Club: CSS Timișoara
- Head coach: Octavian Belu
- Assistant coach: Mariana Bitang
- Retired: 2002
Medal record
World Championships
Gold medal – first place	2001 Ghent	Team competition

Andrea Elena Ulmeanu (born 15 May 1984) is a retired Romanian artistic gymnast. She is a gold world medalist with the team (2001).
