= Carmen Ionescu (gymnast) =

Romanian artistic gymnast

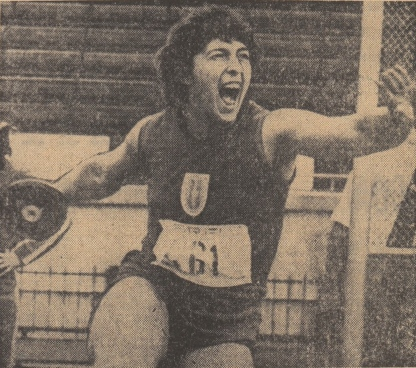
- Born: 22 November 1985 (age 40) Bucharest

Gymnastics career
- Discipline: Women's artistic gymnastics
- Country represented: Romania
- Head coach: Octavian Belu
- Assistant coach: Mariana Bitang
- Retired: 2002
Medal record
World Championships
| Gold medal – first place | 2001 Ghent | Team competition |

Carmen Ionescu (born 22 November 1985 in Bucharest, Romania) is a retired Romanian artistic gymnast. She is a gold world medalist with the team (2001).

Carmen was among the first gymnasts to compete a three-and-a-half twisting back somersault on the floor exercise.
