= Katie Heenan =

American artistic gymnast

- Full name: Katherine Elaine Heenan
- Born: November 26, 1985 (age 40) Indianapolis, Indiana, U.S.
- Height: 5 ft 3 in (160 cm)

Gymnastics career
- Discipline: Women's artistic gymnastics
- Country represented: United States; (1998-2004)
- College team: Georgia Gymdogs
- Club: Capital Gymnastics Training Center
- Head coach: Tatiana Periskaia
Medal record
World Championships
Bronze medal – third place	2001 Ghent	Team
Bronze medal – third place	2001 Ghent	Uneven Bars
Pan American Championships
Gold medal – first place	2001 Cancún	Team
Silver medal – second place	2001 Cancún	Uneven Bars

Katherine Elaine "Katie" Heenan (born November 26, 1985, in Indianapolis, Indiana) is an American former artistic gymnast. She was a seven-time national gymnast and four-time team NCAA champion with the Georgia Gym Dogs.

== Early life ==
Heenan began gymnastics as a toddler and was encouraged by her younger brother, David. Katie quickly rose to the elite level in 1997, at the age of 11. She competed in her first national championships in 1998 and placed sixth on the beam in the junior division. She sat out the 1999 season due to an injury but came back in 2000 to place fourth on bars and ninth in the all-around at the junior national U.S. Championships.

== Senior career ==
Heenan burst into the senior elite spotlight by coming in fourth in the all-around and first on bars at U.S. Classic. At the U.S. National Championships, she continued her success by placing sixth in the all-around and first on bars. Heenan earned a spot on the 2001 U.S. World Championship team and helped the team earn a bronze medal, the first medal since 1995. She then went on to earn a bronze medal on bars, ending the individual medal drought for the U.S.

A string of injuries hampered Heenan in 2002 and 2003. She did manage to compete in the 2003 nationals, coming in 7th place, but injuries kept her out of the international scene.

In 2004, she became the American Classic champion, won gold with her team and on bars at the Pacific Alliance Championships, and competed at the 2004 Olympic Trials. An injury during the trials prevented her from finishing, but she was asked to become the athlete representative at the final Olympic selection camp.

== NCAA career ==
Heenan received a full scholarship with the Georgia Gym Dogs and throughout her time at the university stood out as an all-arounder.

Heenan won the 2005 SEC Championship all-around title as a freshman, making her the second Georgia gymnast with two SEC all-around titles. In 2007, Heenan was named Southeastern Conference Gymnast of the Year and made All-SEC first team. Heenan also tied for first in the all-around with fellow Gym Dog Courtney Kupets at the SEC Championship. In 2008, Heenan received the Honda Sports Award as the nation's top collegiate gymnast.
