= Morgan Hamm =

American Olympic artistic gymnast (born 1982)

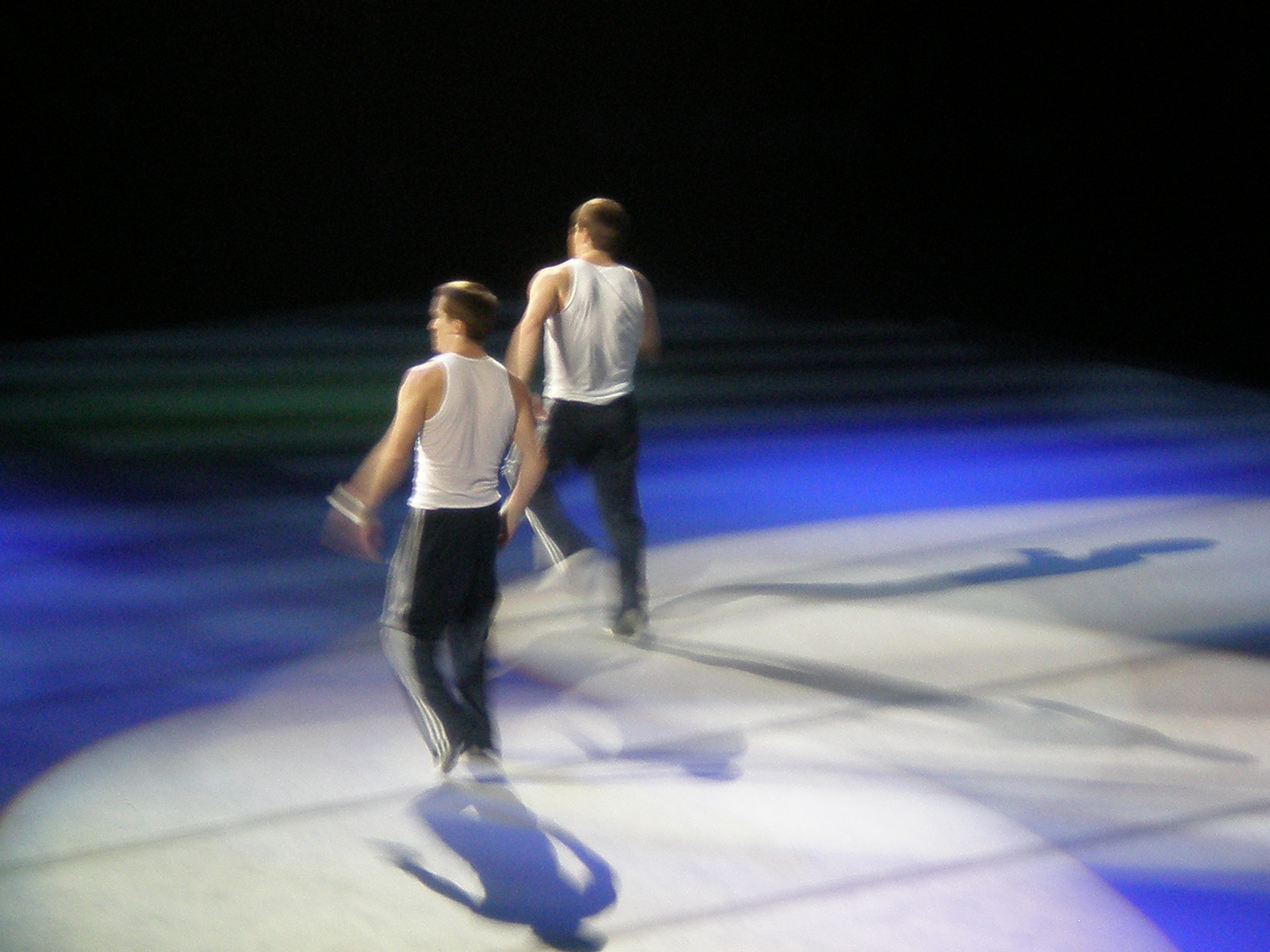
- Morgan and his twin-brother Paul performing in 2008 on The Tour of Gymnastics Superstars

Personal information
- Full name: Morgan Carl Hamm
- Born: September 24, 1982 (age 44) Washburn, Wisconsin, U.S.
- Height: 165 cm (5 ft 5 in)

Gymnastics career
- Discipline: Men's artistic gymnastics
- Country represented: United States; (2000–2005, 2008)
- Gym: Team Chevron; Team Texaco; Swiss Turners
- Head coaches: Miles Avery; Arnold Kvetenadze
- Assistant coach: Doug Stibel
Medal record
Men's artistic gymnastics
Representing United States
Event	1st	2nd	3rd
Olympic Games	0	1	0
World Championships	0	1	0
Pacific Alliance Championships	2	0	1
Total	2	2	1
Olympic Games
Silver medal – second place	2004 Athens	Team
World Championships
Silver medal – second place	2003 Anaheim	Team
Pacific Alliance Championships
Gold medal – first place	2004 Honolulu	Team
Gold medal – first place	2004 Honolulu	Floor
Bronze medal – third place	2004 Honolulu	Pommel horse

Morgan Carl Hamm (born September 24, 1982, in Washburn, Wisconsin) is an American retired artistic gymnast and former member of the United States men's national artistic gymnastics team. He is an Olympic silver medalist in the team competition at the 2004 Olympics and a two-time Olympian (2000, 2004). He was a member of the silver medal-winning team at the 2003 World Championships. Hamm was named to the 2008 Olympic team but withdrew from it due to injury.

== Early life ==
Hamm was born September 24, 1982, in Washburn, Wisconsin, to Sandy and Cecily Hamm. His twin brother, Paul Hamm, is the 2004 Olympic All-Around Champion. His older sister, Elizabeth (Betsy), is a former member of the USA Gymnastics Senior National Team. He was raised in Waukesha, Wisconsin and attended Waukesha South High School.

== Gymnastics career ==
Hamm competed at the 2000 Olympics in Sydney at age 17, and the 2004 Summer Olympics in Athens, alongside his twin brother Paul. At the 2004 Olympics, he won the silver medal with the U.S. team in the team competition. Morgan's contribution to this medal-winning performance was vital as he performed on four of the six apparatuses and was the highest scorer for the team on the vault and horizontal bar. He also competed in the floor and horizontal bar finals and only a tie-breaker kept him from winning the bronze medal in the latter event. Morgan was also a member of the U.S. team at the 2003 World Championships that won a silver medal in the team competition.

In February 2007, Hamm announced that he would return to competitive gymnastics. He competed at the 2007 Visa National Championships, on floor and pommel horse. He competed at the 2008 National Championships and the 2008 Olympic Trials. He was warned by the United States Anti-Doping Agency in July for testing positive for glucocorticosteroid, which is not performance-enhancing or banned but only allowed if proper paperwork is filed to document that the drug is used for therapeutic reasons. Hamm received the substance through an anti-inflammatory shot to his injured ankle but failed to file the paperwork and his results at the May 24 National Championships were thrown out. Hamm claimed that he had a legitimate medical need for the drug. He was ultimately selected for the 2008 Olympic team. However, Hamm withdrew from the Olympics on August 7, 2008, due to an ankle injury. Alexander Artemev replaced him on the team.

=== Airflare ===
Morgan Hamm was the first person to officially introduce the B-Boy maneuver Airflare to gymnastics.

== Personal life ==
Morgan Hamm also competed alongside his brother, Paul Hamm, in the two 2005 Sasuke competitions (#14, #15,). In the 14th competition, he timed out before he attempted the "Rope Climb" in the First Stage. In the 15th competition, he made it to the third stage and ultimately failed on the "Curtain Cling" obstacle. Unlike his brother, he did not compete in the 16th competition.

In 2010, Hamm enrolled at Concordia University Wisconsin to study pharmacology. In 2014, he completed his studies and earned his Doctor of Pharmacy degree. He worked as a pharmacist in Milwaukee.

== Competitive history ==
=== 2008 season ===
Year	Competition Description	Location	Apparatus	Rank-Final	Score-Final	Rank-Qualifying	Score-Qualifying
2008	U.S. Championships	Houston	Floor Exercise	1			
2008	U.S. Championships	Houston	Vault	3 (tie)			
2008	U.S. Championships	Houston	Horizontal bar	3			
2008	U.S. Championships	Houston	Pommel horse	8			

=== 2007 season ===
Year	Competition Description	Location	Apparatus	Rank-Final	Score-Final	Rank-Qualifying	Score-Qualifying
2007	U.S. Championships	San Jose	Pommel horse	9 (tie)			

=== 2004 season ===
Year	Competition Description	Location	Apparatus	Rank-Final	Score-Final	Rank-Qualifying	Score-Qualifying
2004	Olympic Games	Athens	All Around			67	38.662
2004	Olympic Games	Athens	Floor Exercise	8	9.650		
2004	Olympic Games	Athens	Horizontal Bar	4	9.787		
2004	Olympic Games	Athens	Team	2	172.933	2	230.419
2004	World Cup/Series	Rio de Janeiro	Floor Exercise	2	9.637	1	9.612
2004	World Cup/Series	Rio de Janeiro	Horizontal Bar	1	9.550	4	9.275
2004	U.S. Championships	Nashville	Vault	2			
2004	U.S. Championships	Nashville	Horizontal Bar	2			
2004	U.S. Championships	Nashville	All-Around	3			
2004	U.S. Championships	Nashville	Floor Exercise	3			

=== 2003 season ===
Year	Competition Description	Location	Apparatus	Rank-Final	Score-Final	Rank-Qualifying	Score-Qualifying
2003	World Championships	Anaheim	Team	2	171.121	1	227.743
2003	U.S. Championships	Milwaukee	Floor Exercise	1			
2003	U.S. Championships	Milwaukee	All-Around	4			

=== 2002 season ===
Year	Competition Description	Location	Apparatus	Rank-Final	Score-Final	Rank-Qualifying	Score-Qualifying
2002	U.S. Championships	Cleveland	Floor Exercise	1			
2002	U.S. Championships	Cleveland	All-Around	4			

=== 2001 season ===
Year	Competition Description	Location	Apparatus	Rank-Final	Score-Final	Rank-Qualifying	Score-Qualifying
2001	World Championships	Ghent	Team	2	166.845	2	221.420

=== 2000 season ===
Year	Competition Description	Location	Apparatus	Rank-Final	Score-Final	Rank-Qualifying	Score-Qualifying
2000	Olympic Games	Sydney	Floor Exercise	7	9.262	7	9.612
2000	Olympic Games	Sydney	Team	5	228.983	4	229.208
