= Jason Gatson =

American artistic gymnast

- Born: June 25, 1980 (age 46) Mesa, Arizona, U.S.
- Height: 5 ft 5 in (165 cm)

Gymnastics career
- Discipline: Men's artistic gymnastics
- Country represented: United States (1997–2000, 2002–2007)
- Gym: USOTC; Team Chevron
- Eponymous skills: Gatson 1 (Parallel bars); Gatson 2 (Parallel bars)
Medal record
Men's artistic gymnastics
Representing United States
Event	1st	2nd	3rd
Olympic Games	0	1	0
World Championships	0	1	0
Pacific Alliance Championships	1	1	0
Total	1	3	0
Olympic Games
Silver medal – second place	2004 Athens	Team
World Championships
Silver medal – second place	2003 Anaheim	Team
Pacific Alliance Championships
Gold medal – first place	2004 Honolulu	Team
Silver medal – second place	2004 Honolulu	Rings

Jason Gatson (born June 25, 1980) is a retired American gymnast. He was a member of the United States men's national artistic gymnastics team and won an Olympic silver medal at the 2004 Summer Olympics.

== Gymnastics career ==
Gatson competed in his first World Championship in 1997 at 17 years old, placing 5th in the team all-around and 22nd in the individual all-around. Many considered him the next champion for the US team, but injuries and other struggles cost him a chance on the 2000 Olympic team.

Injuries continued to be a problem for Gatson, but in 2003 he finished second in the US national championships and qualified for the World Championship team, where he and his fellow team members won a silver medal in the team competition. He also competed in the all-around final and still rings final, finishing 8th and 7th, respectively.

Gatson battled a back injury heading into the 2004 Olympic trials. Still, he was able to make the Olympic team despite not competing in all of the events. At the 2004 Summer Olympics, Gatson and his team won a silver medal behind Japan. In team finals, Gatson scored 9.825 on his parallel bars routine, the highest score of the day on that apparatus.

== Personal life ==
His knee injuries were featured on the season 2 8th episode on Impact: Stories of Survival, titled "Pentagon Survivor".

Jason's younger brother, Brandon Gatson, is a professional wrestler.

== Eponymous skills ==
Gatson has two named elements on the parallel bars.

Gymnastics elements named after Jason Gatson
Apparatus	Name	Description	Difficulty (Note: Valid for the 2025–2028 Code of Points)	Added to Code of Points
Parallel bars	Gatson 1	"Swing bwd. with 1/1 t. hop to handstand."	E, 0.5	1997
Parallel bars	Gatson 2	"Gatson 1 with ¼ t to handstand on 1 rail and ¼ t. handstand on 2 rails."	E, 0.5	2003
