= Sean Townsend =

American artistic gymnast

- Full name: Sean Lanier Townsend
- Born: January 20, 1979 (age 47) Temple, Texas, U.S.
- Height: 161 cm (5 ft 3 in)

Gymnastics career
- Discipline: Men's artistic gymnastics
- Country represented: United States; (1998–2008)
- Gym: Houston Gymnastics Academy; Team Chevron; Team Gattaca; Team Texaco
- Head coach: Kevin Mazeika
- Retired: 2008
Medal record
Men's artistic gymnastics
Representing United States
Event	1st	2nd	3rd
World Championships	1	1	0
Pacific Alliance Championships	1	0	1
Total	2	1	1
World Championships
Gold medal – first place	2001 Ghent	Parallel bars
Silver medal – second place	2001 Ghent	Team
Pacific Alliance Championships
Gold medal – first place	2002 Vancouver	Team
Bronze medal – third place	2002 Vancouver	Rings

Sean Lanier Townsend (born January 20, 1979, in Temple, Texas) is an American artistic gymnast. He was a member of the United States men's national artistic gymnastics team and competed at the 2000 Summer Olympics in Sydney, Australia and 1999 World Artistic Gymnastics Championships. He was part of the 2001 World Artistic Gymnastics Championships team where he became world champion on Parallel Bars and helped his team win a silver medal in the Team final. He also qualified for the men's individual all-around final where he placed 8th.

In 2001, he was a finalist for the James E. Sullivan Award.
