= Paul Hamm =

American artistic gymnast (born 1982)

- Hamm in 2010

Personal information
- Full name: Paul Elbert Hamm
- Born: September 24, 1982 (age 44) Washburn, Wisconsin, U.S.
- Height: 165 cm (5 ft 5 in)

Gymnastics career
- Discipline: Men's artistic gymnastics
- Country represented: United States; (2000–2005, 2007–2009)
- Gym: Team Chevron; Team Texaco; Swiss Turners
- Head coaches: Miles Avery; Arnold Kvetenadze
- Assistant coach: Doug Stibel
Medal record
Men's artistic gymnastics
Representing United States
Event	1st	2nd	3rd
Olympic Games	1	2	0
World Championships	2	2	1
Pacific Rim Championships	12	2	4
Total	15	6	5
Olympic Games
Gold medal – first place	2004 Athens	All-around
Silver medal – second place	2004 Athens	Team
Silver medal – second place	2004 Athens	Horizontal bar
World Championships
Gold medal – first place	2003 Anaheim	All-around
Gold medal – first place	2003 Anaheim	Floor
Silver medal – second place	2001 Ghent	Team
Silver medal – second place	2003 Anaheim	Team
Bronze medal – third place	2002 Debrecen	Floor
Pacific Rim Championships
Gold medal – first place	2002 Vancouver	Team
Gold medal – first place	2002 Vancouver	All-around
Gold medal – first place	2002 Vancouver	Vault
Gold medal – first place	2002 Vancouver	Horizontal bar
Gold medal – first place	2004 Honolulu	Team
Gold medal – first place	2004 Honolulu	All-around
Gold medal – first place	2004 Honolulu	Vault
Gold medal – first place	2004 Honolulu	Horizontal bar
Gold medal – first place	2008 San Jose	Team
Gold medal – first place	2008 San Jose	All-around
Gold medal – first place	2008 San Jose	Pommel horse
Gold medal – first place	2008 San Jose	Parallel bars
Silver medal – second place	2004 Honolulu	Floor
Silver medal – second place	2008 San Jose	Floor
Bronze medal – third place	2002 Vancouver	Floor
Bronze medal – third place	2004 Honolulu	Pommel horse
Bronze medal – third place	2004 Honolulu	Parallel bars
Bronze medal – third place	2008 San Jose	Horizontal bar

Paul Elbert Hamm (born September 24, 1982) is an American retired artistic gymnast and member of the United States men's national artistic gymnastics team. He is the 2004 Olympic all-around champion, a three-time Olympic medalist, and the 2003 World all-around champion. Hamm is the most decorated U.S. male gymnast in history, one of only two American gymnasts (along with Simone Biles) to win the all-around title at both the Olympics and the World Championships, and the only male American gymnast to do so.

== Early life ==
Hamm was born September 24, 1982, in Washburn, Wisconsin, to Sandy and Cecily Hamm. His twin brother, Morgan Hamm, is also a gymnast and Olympic medalist. His older sister, Elizabeth (Betsy), is a former member of the USA Gymnastics Senior National Team. He was raised in Waukesha, Wisconsin and attended Waukesha South High School.

== Gymnastics career ==
Hamm is a three-time, consecutive U.S. National all-around champion, winning the titles from 2002 to 2004. In 2003, he became the first American man to win the all-around title at a World Championships. At the 2000 Summer Olympics in Sydney, Hamm competed alongside his twin brother Morgan Hamm and finished 5th in the team competition and 14th in the individual all-around competition.

=== 2004 Summer Olympics ===
Hamm competed at the 2004 Summer Olympics in Athens once again with his twin brother Morgan Hamm. He won the silver medal in the team competition and won the gold medal in the all-around. He also nearly won the gold medal on the horizontal bar but was awarded the silver medal after a tiebreaker.

In the all-around competition, Hamm took a disastrous fall on the vault in the fourth rotation, nearly falling into the judges' bench, and had a judge and the bench not been able to break Hamm's fall, he might have fallen from the podium and sustained injury. However, numerous faults by the other gymnasts, combined with Hamm's performance on the parallel bars, returned him to fourth place after the fifth rotation. His horizontal bar routine in the final rotation earned a score of 9.837, winning him the gold medal by a margin of .012, the closest in Olympic gymnastics history. His scores on the six disciplines were:

- Floor: 9.725 (1st)
- Pommel Horse: 9.700 (4th)
- Rings: 9.587 (8th)
- Vault: 9.137 (12th)
- Parallel Bars: 9.837 (1st)
- Horizontal bar: 9.837 (1st)
- Overall: 57.823 (1st)

==== Gold medal controversy ====
Almost immediately after the competition, Hamm's gold medal in the all-around was called into doubt due to a scoring issue.

The International Gymnastics Federation (FIG) ruled that South Korean bronze medalist Yang Tae Young was incorrectly given a start value of 9.9 instead of 10.0 in the parallel bars event during the all-around final. The 0.100 point omitted from Yang's start value in parallel bars, determined by the difficulty of the routine, was because the judges believed Yang had performed a move called a "morisue" instead of a "belle" during his routine. The difference in difficulty between those two moves—the 0.100 point—was the difference between third place and first, and, therefore, between the bronze medal and the gold medal. The FIG suspended three judges but said the results would not be changed.

Adding to the news headlines, when the FIG ruled Yang's start value was incorrect, the crowd began booing the judges for about ten minutes.

The USOC also argued that changing scores after the fact was a violation of the rules of the competition (under which gymnastic scores must be disputed immediately—before the gymnasts move to the next piece of equipment, and certainly before the medals are awarded) and that second-guessing scores set a harmful precedent in that the judges at the event had to make the decisions and nothing would ever be finalized if second-guessing and video review of entire competitions after they ended were permitted. Hamm also pointed out that Yang's routine included 4 'hangs' instead of the 3 allowed, an error that, if caught, would have resulted in a penalty of .2 points, removing Yang from medal contention.

Others argued that this deduction had not been taken when other gymnasts had exceeded the required number and therefore ought not to apply in this case. Hamm supporters also contended that Hamm had earned the right to be the last gymnast to compete based on his performance on the initial night of the competition and knowing what he needed to earn a gold, silver, or bronze medal, he had adjusted his horizontal bar routine accordingly. If Yang Tae Young had been awarded an additional 0.100 point, Hamm would have been able to adjust his routine to take account of that fact, and might have earned a higher score on the horizontal bar, the final piece of equipment.

Eventually, Bruno Grandi, President of the FIG, stated that the FIG would not change the results of the all-around. However, the FIG sent a letter to Hamm in care of the United States Olympic Committee, stating:

If, (according to you [sic] declarations to the press), you would return your medal to the Korean if the FIG requested it, then such an action would be recognised as the ultimate demonstration of Fair-play by the whole world. The FIG and the IOC would highly appreciate the magnitude of this gesture.

In the letter, Grandi stated that Yang Tae Young was the "true winner" of the competition.

For the complete text, see this link.

The USOC was outraged by the FIG's request and refused to deliver the letter. In a response letter to the FIG, the USOC stated:

The USOC views this letter as a blatant and inappropriate attempt on the part of FIG to once again shift responsibility for its own mistakes and instead pressure Mr. Hamm into resolving what has become an embarrassing situation for the Federation. The USOC finds this request to be improper, outrageous and so far beyond the bounds of what is acceptable that it refuses to transmit the letter to Mr. Hamm.

In the letter, the USOC also noted that the International Olympic Committee ("IOC") and its president, Jacques Rogge, opposed FIG's efforts to pressure Hamm in this manner, in direct contradiction to an implication made in the FIG's letter.

For the complete text of the USOC's response, see this link.

Yang then filed an official appeal with the Court of Arbitration for Sport (CAS), seeking to have his score changed and be awarded the gold medal. On September 27, 2004, Hamm and the USOC appeared before the court in Lausanne, Switzerland during a hearing that lasted eleven and one-half hours. Nearly one month later, on October 21, 2004, a three-judge CAS panel announced that the results from the Olympics would remain and that Paul Hamm would get to keep the gold medal. The verdict was final and could not be appealed. (See this link for the complete text of the decision.)

When asked whether or not he still deserved the gold medal by a news reporter, Hamm replied that he "shouldn't even be dealing with this." He later said, "I do understand and feel the disappointment that Yang Tae Young has been subjected to and I hope he understands what I have been through as well."

=== Effects of controversy ===
Immediately following the Olympics, General Mills announced which U.S. Olympians would appear on individual boxes of Wheaties cereal: swimmer Michael Phelps, gymnast Carly Patterson, and sprinter Justin Gatlin. Hamm was in talks to appear on a box, but the talks were dropped after the controversy.

=== Sullivan Award ===
Hamm was the James E. Sullivan Award winner for 2004 as the outstanding amateur athlete in the United States. He was the second gymnast to receive this honor after Kurt Thomas.

=== Comeback attempt for 2008 Olympics ===
Paul and Morgan Hamm took some time off after the 2004 Olympics to focus on school at Ohio State University. They announced in February 2007 that they would return to competitive gymnastics, starting at the 2007 U.S. Championships, also known as the Visa Championships, after their title sponsor. In March 2008, Paul won the American Cup held in New York City. This was the first time he won this competition and performed with a strong showing.

On May 22, Paul competed on the first day of the 2008 U.S. Championships but was forced to withdraw after day one after injuring his hand. During his routine on the parallel bars, he fractured the fourth metacarpal of his right hand. Orthopedic surgery five days later placed a titanium plate and nine screws in his hand and Paul was not cleared to return to gymnastics until July 3. After sitting out the Olympic Trials, he was named to the 2008 Olympic Team on a provisional basis depending on his recovery. On July 19 he secured his spot on the 2008 team by participating in an intersquad meet and performed in all six events, only slightly modifying his routines to prevent aggravation of his injury.

On July 28, Paul announced his withdrawal from the United States Olympic gymnastics team due to persistent pain in his right hand and a new injury to his left shoulder from his accelerated recovery efforts. He was replaced on the team by Raj Bhavsar. He indicated that he would permanently retire from the sport.

=== Comeback attempt for 2012 Olympics ===
Paul Hamm attempted to come back for the 2012 Olympic team, but eventually ceased training and once again announced his retirement. He stated, "The years of training have taken a toll on my body and training at an Olympic level is no longer sustainable."

== Accolades ==
On December 15, 2015, it was announced that Hamm had been inducted into the 2016 class of the USA Gymnastics Hall of Fame.

== Coaching career ==
Hamm was an assistant coach for the Ohio State Buckeyes men's gymnastics team from June 6, 2011, to September 9, 2011. He was fired after being charged with assault stemming from a taxi cab incident.

== Personal life ==
Hamm also competed on the popular Japanese television show, Sasuke (in America/UK: Ninja Warrior). He and his brother Morgan took part in three tournaments (#14, 15, and 16). Paul made it to the second stage of the 14th competition but missed completing it by inches (he cleared the last obstacle, the "Wall Lifting", but forgot to hit the red button before time ran out). In the 15th competition, he was unable to pass the First Stage obstacle, the "Warped Wall". In the 16th competition, he made it to the second stage again but failed on the obstacle known as the "Metal Spin".

On September 3, 2011, Hamm was accused of assaulting an Ohio taxi driver, damaging that taxi's window and refusing to pay his fare. He was arrested, and while in custody threatened the arresting officers. Hamm was charged with assault and two other misdemeanors. On September 9, Hamm was fired from his coaching position at Ohio State.

On Thursday, February 23, 2012, Hamm pleaded no contest to a reduced set of two misdemeanor charges in an Upper Arlington court in suburban Columbus. A misdemeanor assault charge was dismissed.

A magistrate suspended a sentence of 90 days in custody on each count, provided that Hamm completes a year of probation, pay the cab fare, plus court fees, and must sit with a counselor for an alcohol assessment.

== Competitive history ==
=== 2008 season ===
Year	Competition Description	Location	Apparatus	Rank-Final	Score-Final	Rank-Qualifying	Score-Qualifying
2008	Winter Cup Challenge	Las Vegas	All Around	1			
2008	Winter Cup Challenge	Las Vegas	Floor Exercise	1			
2008	Winter Cup Challenge	Las Vegas	Parallel bars	1			
2008	Winter Cup Challenge	Las Vegas	Pommel Horse	2			
2008	Winter Cup Challenge	Las Vegas	Horizontal Bar	2			
2008	American Cup	New York	All Around	1			
2008	Pacific Rim Championships	San Jose	Team	1			
2008	Pacific Rim Championships	San Jose	All Around	1			
2008	Pacific Rim Championships	San Jose	Pommel horse	1			
2008	Pacific Rim Championships	San Jose	Parallel bars	1 (tie)			
2008	Pacific Rim Championships	San Jose	Floor Exercise	2			
2008	Pacific Rim Championships	San Jose	Horizontal Bar	3			
2008	Pacific Rim Championships	San Jose	Still Rings	5			

=== 2007 season ===
Year	Competition Description	Location	Apparatus	Rank-Final	Score-Final	Rank-Qualifying	Score-Qualifying
2007	U.S. Championships	San Jose	Floor Exercise	1			
2007	U.S. Championships	San Jose	Pommel horse	4			

=== 2004 season ===
Year	Competition Description	Location	Apparatus	Rank-Final	Score-Final	Rank-Qualifying	Score-Qualifying
2004	Olympic Games	Athens	All Around	1	57.823	1	58.061
2004	Olympic Games	Athens	Floor Exercise	5	9.712		
2004	Olympic Games	Athens	Horizontal Bar	2	9.813		
2004	Olympic Games	Athens	Parallel Bars	7	9.737		
2004	Olympic Games	Athens	Pommel Horse	6	9.737		
2004	Olympic Games	Athens	Team	2	172.933	2	230.419
2004	World Cup/Series	Lyon	Horizontal Bar	4	9.400	3	9.587
2004	World Cup/Series	Lyon	Parallel Bars	7	7	9.550	
2004	U.S. Championships	Nashville	All Around	1			
2004	U.S. Championships	Nashville	Floor Exercise	1			
2004	U.S. Championships	Nashville	Horizontal Bar	1			
2004	U.S. Championships	Nashville	Pommel horse	2			
2004	U.S. Championships	Nashville	Parallel bar	2 (tie)			
2004	Pacific Alliance Championships	Honolulu	Team	1			
2004	Pacific Alliance Championships	Honolulu	All Around	1			
2004	Pacific Alliance Championships	Honolulu	Vault	1			
2004	Pacific Alliance Championships	Honolulu	Horizontal Bar	1			
2004	Pacific Alliance Championships	Honolulu	Floor Exercise	2			
2004	Pacific Alliance Championships	Honolulu	Pommel Horse	3 (tie)			
2004	Pacific Alliance Championships	Honolulu	Parallel bar	3			
2004	American Cup	New York	Still Rings	2			
2004	American Cup	New York	All Around	3			
2004	American Cup	New York	Vault	3 (tie)			
2004	American Cup	New York	Parallel bars	3			

=== 2003 season ===
Year	Competition Description	Location	Apparatus	Rank-Final	Score-Final	Rank-Qualifying	Score-Qualifying
2003	World Championships	Anaheim	All Around	1	57.774	2	56.848
2003	World Championships	Anaheim	Floor Exercise	1	9.762		
2003	World Championships	Anaheim	Team	2	171.121	1	227.743
2003	U.S. Championships	Milwaukee	All Around	1			
2003	U.S. Championships	Milwaukee	Pommel horse	1			
2003	U.S. Championships	Milwaukee	Horizontal bar	1			
2003	U.S. Championships	Milwaukee	Floor Exercise	2			
2003	U.S. Championships	Milwaukee	Parallel bar	2			

=== 2002 season ===
Year	Competition Description	Location	Apparatus	Rank-Final	Score-Final	Rank-Qualifying	Score-Qualifying
2002	World Championships	Debrecen	Floor Exercise	3	9.625	4	9.612
2002	World Championships	Debrecen	Horizontal Bar	7	8.887	3	9.625
2002	World Championships	Debrecen	Pommel Horse	8	9.050	7	9.587
2002	U.S. Championships	Cleveland	All Around	1			
2002	U.S. Championships	Cleveland	Pomel horse	1			
2002	U.S. Championships	Cleveland	Vault	1			
2002	U.S. Championships	Cleveland	Floor Exercise	2			
2002	U.S. Championships	Cleveland	Parallel bar	3			
2002	U.S. Championships	Cleveland	Still Rings	6 (tie)			
2002	Pacific Alliance Championships	Vancouver	Team	1			
2002	Pacific Alliance Championships	Vancouver	All Around	1			
2002	Pacific Alliance Championships	Vancouver	Vault	1			
2002	Pacific Alliance Championships	Vancouver	Horizontal Bar	1 (tie)			
2002	Pacific Alliance Championships	Vancouver	Floor Exercise	3			
2002	American Cup	Orlando	All Around	2			

=== 2001 season ===
Year	Competition Description	Location	Apparatus	Rank-Final	Score-Final	Rank-Qualifying	Score-Qualifying
2001	World Championships	Ghent	All Around	7	55.335	4	55.561

=== 2000 season ===
Year	Competition Description	Location	Apparatus	Rank-Final	Score-Final	Rank-Qualifying	Score-Qualifying
2000	Olympic Games	Sydney	All Around	14	57.049	6	57.436
2000	Olympic Games	Sydney	Floor Exercise			16	9.475
2000	Olympic Games	Sydney	Team	5	228.983	4	229.208
2000	Olympic Games	Sydney	Vault			9	9.700
