= Sven Kwiatkowski =

German gymnast

- Born: 14 April 1977 (age 49) Freiberg, East Germany
- Height: 1.71 m (5 ft 7 in)

Gymnastics career
- Discipline: Men's artistic gymnastics
- Country represented: Germany
- Gym: Kunstturnverein Chemnitz

Sven Kwiatkowski (born 14 April 1977) is a German gymnast. He competed in the team final at the 2004 Summer Olympics.
