= Gymnastics at the 2010 Asian Games – Women's artistic individual all-around =

Women's individual all-around at the 2010 Asian Games
- Venue: Asian Games Town Gymnasium
- Date: 14–15 November 2010
- Competitors: 37 from 12 nations

Medalists
gold medal	Sui Lu	China
silver medal	Huang Qiushuang	China
bronze medal	Rie Tanaka	Japan

The women's artistic individual all-around competition at the 2010 Asian Games in Guangzhou, China was held on 14 and 15 November 2010 at the Asian Games Town Gymnasium.

== Schedule ==
All times are China Standard Time (UTC+08:00)

Date	Time	Event
Sunday, 14 November 2010	09:30	Qualification
Monday, 15 November 2010	19:30	Final

== Results ==
=== Qualification ===
Rank	Athlete	Vault (gymnastics)	Uneven bars	Balance beam	Floor (gymnastics)	Total
1	Huang Qiushuang (CHN)	15.300	15.850	13.950	13.900	59.000
2	Sui Lu (CHN)	13.700	14.050	15.300	14.500	57.550
3	Yang Yilin (CHN)	14.950	14.950	13.800	13.600	57.300
4	Rie Tanaka (JPN)	14.750	14.350	14.000	13.350	56.450
5	Jiang Yuyuan (CHN)	14.850	14.400	13.450	13.050	55.750
6	Kyoko Oshima (JPN)	13.950	14.150	13.500	13.000	54.600
7	Koko Tsurumi (JPN)	13.850	14.450	13.900	11.950	54.150
8	Darya Elizarova (UZB)	13.700	13.550	13.600	13.300	54.150
9	Luiza Galiulina (UZB)	13.300	13.300	14.250	12.950	53.800
10	Jo Hyun-joo (KOR)	14.750	12.650	12.150	12.800	52.350
11	Đỗ Thị Ngân Thương (VIE)	13.650	11.950	12.700	13.250	51.550
12	Park Ji-yeon (KOR)	13.750	13.450	13.050	11.150	51.400
13	Park Eun-kyung (KOR)	13.750	13.200	12.500	11.850	51.300
14	Lim Heem Wei (SIN)	13.550	12.550	13.200	11.900	51.200
15	Tracie Ang (MAS)	12.550	11.750	13.700	12.000	50.000
16	Irina Volodchenko (UZB)	13.550	12.050	12.800	11.350	49.750
17	Asal Saparbaeva (UZB)	12.900	11.850	12.200	12.350	49.300
18	Kim Ye-eun (KOR)	13.700	12.500	12.000	10.800	49.000
19	Angel Wong (HKG)	13.400	10.600	12.450	11.050	47.500
20	Đỗ Thị Thu Huyền (VIE)	13.650	8.600	12.750	12.050	47.050
21	Krystal Khoo (SIN)	12.750	8.900	10.700	10.400	42.750
22	Al-Jazy Al-Habshi (QAT)	12.800	8.150	10.700	10.650	42.300
23	Mananchaya Senklang (THA)	12.650	9.150	11.100	9.400	42.300
24	Mai Yamagishi (JPN)	14.200		14.350	13.350	41.900
25	Phan Thị Hà Thanh (VIE)	14.000		13.050	12.500	39.550
26	Moon Eun-mee (KOR)	13.100		13.550	12.050	38.700
27	Momoko Ozawa (JPN)	15.050	11.350		11.650	38.050
28	Dipa Karmakar (IND)	13.850		11.700	10.900	36.450
29	Meenakshi (IND)	12.150		11.500	9.350	33.000
30	Priti Das (IND)	11.150		11.100	8.250	30.500
31	He Kexin (CHN)		16.100		13.700	29.800
32	Deng Linlin (CHN)	14.350		14.650		29.000
33	Yuko Shintake (JPN)		14.200	14.250		28.450
34	Yuliya Goreva (UZB)	13.200			11.800	25.000
35	Diana Karimdjanova (UZB)		11.750	12.400		24.150
36	Frances Audrey Muñoz (PHI)			10.400	9.300	19.700
37	Eum Eun-hui (KOR)		11.850			11.850

=== Final ===
Rank	Athlete	Vault (gymnastics)	Uneven bars	Balance beam	Floor (gymnastics)	Total
1st place, gold medalist(s)	Sui Lu (CHN)	14.100	14.150	15.350	14.800	58.400
2nd place, silver medalist(s)	Huang Qiushuang (CHN)	15.150	14.150	14.250	14.500	58.050
3rd place, bronze medalist(s)	Rie Tanaka (JPN)	14.550	13.700	13.100	13.500	54.850
4	Darya Elizarova (UZB)	13.800	13.550	13.350	13.800	54.500
5	Luiza Galiulina (UZB)	12.850	13.200	13.650	13.200	52.900
6	Kyoko Oshima (JPN)	13.600	12.900	13.400	12.450	52.350
7	Park Ji-yeon (KOR)	12.700	13.350	13.050	13.050	52.150
8	Đỗ Thị Ngân Thương (VIE)	13.850	11.650	12.750	13.450	51.700
9	Kim Ye-eun (KOR)	13.900	12.000	12.950	12.550	51.400
10	Tracie Ang (MAS)	13.800	12.250	12.400	12.700	51.150
11	Angel Wong (HKG)	14.050	10.800	11.150	12.700	48.700
12	Lim Heem Wei (SIN)	13.250	12.350	9.500	12.350	47.450
13	Mananchaya Senklang (THA)	12.700	9.550	12.050	11.350	45.650
14	Al-Jazy Al-Habshi (QAT)	12.550	8.900	10.200	10.250	41.900
15	Krystal Khoo (SIN)	11.550	9.400	9.550	10.900	41.400
