= Gymnastics at the 2010 Asian Games – Women's uneven bars =

Women's uneven bars at the 2010 Asian Games
- Venue: Asian Games Town Gymnasium
- Date: 14–16 November 2010
- Competitors: 28 from 10 nations

Medalists
gold medal	He Kexin	China
silver medal	Huang Qiushuang	China
bronze medal	Koko Tsurumi	Japan

The women's uneven bars competition at the 2010 Asian Games in Guangzhou, China was held on 14 and 16 November 2010 at the Asian Games Town Gymnasium.

== Schedule ==
All times are China Standard Time (UTC+08:00)

Date	Time	Event
Sunday, 14 November 2010	09:30	Qualification
Tuesday, 16 November 2010	21:00	Final

== Results ==
=== Qualification ===
Rank	Athlete	Score
1	He Kexin (CHN)	16.100
2	Huang Qiushuang (CHN)	15.850
3	Yang Yilin (CHN)	14.950
4	Koko Tsurumi (JPN)	14.450
5	Jiang Yuyuan (CHN)	14.400
6	Rie Tanaka (JPN)	14.350
7	Yuko Shintake (JPN)	14.200
8	Kyoko Oshima (JPN)	14.150
9	Sui Lu (CHN)	14.050
10	Darya Elizarova (UZB)	13.550
11	Park Ji-yeon (KOR)	13.450
12	Luiza Galiulina (UZB)	13.300
13	Park Eun-kyung (KOR)	13.200
14	Jo Hyun-joo (KOR)	12.650
15	Lim Heem Wei (SIN)	12.550
16	Kim Ye-eun (KOR)	12.500
17	Irina Volodchenko (UZB)	12.050
18	Đỗ Thị Ngân Thương (VIE)	11.950
19	Eum Eun-hui (KOR)	11.850
20	Asal Saparbaeva (UZB)	11.850
21	Diana Karimdjanova (UZB)	11.750
22	Tracie Ang (MAS)	11.750
23	Momoko Ozawa (JPN)	11.350
24	Angel Wong (HKG)	10.600
25	Mananchaya Senklang (THA)	9.150
26	Krystal Khoo (SIN)	8.900
27	Đỗ Thị Thu Huyền (VIE)	8.600
28	Al-Jazy Al-Habshi (QAT)	8.150

=== Final ===
Rank	Athlete	Score
1st place, gold medalist(s)	He Kexin (CHN)	16.425
2nd place, silver medalist(s)	Huang Qiushuang (CHN)	15.825
3rd place, bronze medalist(s)	Koko Tsurumi (JPN)	14.300
4	Darya Elizarova (UZB)	13.750
5	Park Ji-yeon (KOR)	13.400
6	Rie Tanaka (JPN)	13.075
7	Park Eun-kyung (KOR)	12.775
8	Lim Heem Wei (SIN)	12.300
