= Gymnastics at the 2010 Asian Games – Women's balance beam =

Women's balance beam at the 2010 Asian Games
- Venue: Asian Games Town Gymnasium
- Date: 14–17 November 2010
- Competitors: 33 from 12 nations

Medalists
| gold medal | Sui Lu | China |
| silver medal | Deng Linlin | China |
| bronze medal | Luiza Galiulina | Uzbekistan |

The women's balance beam competition at the 2010 Asian Games in Guangzhou, China was held on 14 and 17 November 2010 at the Asian Games Town Gymnasium.

== Schedule ==
All times are China Standard Time (UTC+08:00)

| Date | Time | Event |
|---|---|---|
| Sunday, 14 November 2010 | 09:30 | Qualification |
| Wednesday, 17 November 2010 | 19:30 | Final |

== Results ==
=== Qualification ===
| Rank | Athlete | Score |
|---|---|---|
| 1 | Sui Lu (CHN) | 15.300 |
| 2 | Deng Linlin (CHN) | 14.650 |
| 3 | Mai Yamagishi (JPN) | 14.350 |
| 4 | Yuko Shintake (JPN) | 14.250 |
| 5 | Luiza Galiulina (UZB) | 14.250 |
| 6 | Rie Tanaka (JPN) | 14.000 |
| 7 | Huang Qiushuang (CHN) | 13.950 |
| 8 | Koko Tsurumi (JPN) | 13.900 |
| 9 | Yang Yilin (CHN) | 13.800 |
| 10 | Tracie Ang (MAS) | 13.700 |
| 11 | Darya Elizarova (UZB) | 13.600 |
| 12 | Moon Eun-mee (KOR) | 13.550 |
| 13 | Kyoko Oshima (JPN) | 13.500 |
| 14 | Jiang Yuyuan (CHN) | 13.450 |
| 15 | Lim Heem Wei (SIN) | 13.200 |
| 16 | Park Ji-yeon (KOR) | 13.050 |
| 17 | Phan Thị Hà Thanh (VIE) | 13.050 |
| 18 | Irina Volodchenko (UZB) | 12.800 |
| 19 | Đỗ Thị Thu Huyền (VIE) | 12.750 |
| 20 | Đỗ Thị Ngân Thương (VIE) | 12.700 |
| 21 | Park Eun-kyung (KOR) | 12.500 |
| 22 | Angel Wong (HKG) | 12.450 |
| 23 | Diana Karimdjanova (UZB) | 12.400 |
| 24 | Asal Saparbaeva (UZB) | 12.200 |
| 25 | Jo Hyun-joo (KOR) | 12.150 |
| 26 | Kim Ye-eun (KOR) | 12.000 |
| 27 | Dipa Karmakar (IND) | 11.700 |
| 28 | Meenakshi (IND) | 11.500 |
| 29 | Priti Das (IND) | 11.100 |
| 30 | Mananchaya Senklang (THA) | 11.100 |
| 31 | Krystal Khoo (SIN) | 10.700 |
| 32 | Al-Jazy Al-Habshi (QAT) | 10.700 |
| 33 | Frances Audrey Muñoz (PHI) | 10.400 |

=== Final ===
| Rank | Athlete | Score |
|---|---|---|
| 1st place, gold medalist(s) | Sui Lu (CHN) | 15.425 |
| 2nd place, silver medalist(s) | Deng Linlin (CHN) | 15.200 |
| 3rd place, bronze medalist(s) | Luiza Galiulina (UZB) | 14.350 |
| 4 | Mai Yamagishi (JPN) | 13.450 |
| 5 | Yuko Shintake (JPN) | 13.075 |
| 6 | Moon Eun-mee (KOR) | 12.325 |
| 7 | Tracie Ang (MAS) | 11.950 |
| 8 | Darya Elizarova (UZB) | 11.650 |
