= Gymnastics at the Asian Games =

- Dates: Artistic: 1974-present Rhythmic: 1994-present Trampoline: 2006-present
- Competitors: OCA member competitors from OCA member nations

Gymnastics events have been contested at every Asian Games since 1974 Asian Games in Tehran.

== Editions ==
Games	Year	Host city	Events (men / women)	Winner of the artistic gymnastics medal table	Winner of the rhythmic gymnastics medal table	Winner of the trampoline medal table
VII	1974	(Iran) Tehran	8 / 6	China (CHN)	—N/a	—N/a
VIII	1978	(Thailand) Bangkok	8 / 6	China (CHN)	—N/a	—N/a
IX	1982	(India) New Delhi	8 / 6	China (CHN)	—N/a	—N/a
X	1986	(South Korea) Seoul	8 / 6	China (CHN)	—N/a	—N/a
XI	1990	(China) Beijing	8 / 6	China (CHN)	—N/a	—N/a
XII	1994	(Japan) Hiroshima	8 / 7	China (CHN)	Japan (JPN)	—N/a
XIII	1998	(Thailand) Bangkok	8 / 8	China (CHN)	China (CHN)	—N/a
XIV	2002	(South Korea) Busan	8 / 8	China (CHN)	China (CHN)	—N/a
XV	2006	(Qatar) Doha	9 / 9	China (CHN)	Kazakhstan (KAZ)	China (CHN)
XVI	2010	(China) Guangzhou	9 / 9	China (CHN)	Kazakhstan (KAZ)	China (CHN)
XVII	2014	(South Korea) Incheon	9 / 9	China (CHN)	South Korea (KOR)	China (CHN)
XVIII	2018	(Indonesia) Jakarta–Palembang	9 / 9	China (CHN)	Kazakhstan (KAZ)	China (CHN)
XIX	2022	(China) Hangzhou	9 / 9	China (CHN)	Uzbekistan (UZB)	China (CHN)
XX	2026	(Japan) Aichi–Nagoya	9 / 9	China (CHN)	China (CHN)	China (CHN)

== Events ==
=== Artistic ===
Event	74	78	82	86	90	94	98	02	06	10	14	18	22	26	Years
Men's team	X	X	X	X	X	X	X	X	X	X	X	X	X	X	14
Men's individual all-around	X	X	X	X	X	X	X	X	X	X	X	X	X	X	14
Men's floor	X	X	X	X	X	X	X	X	X	X	X	X	X	X	14
Men's pommel horse	X	X	X	X	X	X	X	X	X	X	X	X	X	X	14
Men's rings	X	X	X	X	X	X	X	X	X	X	X	X	X	X	14
Men's vault	X	X	X	X	X	X	X	X	X	X	X	X	X	X	14
Men's parallel bars	X	X	X	X	X	X	X	X	X	X	X	X	X	X	14
Men's horizontal bar	X	X	X	X	X	X	X	X	X	X	X	X	X	X	14
Women's team	X	X	X	X	X	X	X	X	X	X	X	X	X	X	14
Women's individual all-around	X	X	X	X	X	X	X	X	X	X	X	X	X	X	14
Women's vault	X	X	X	X	X	X	X	X	X	X	X	X	X	X	14
Women's uneven bars	X	X	X	X	X	X	X	X	X	X	X	X	X	X	14
Women's balance beam	X	X	X	X	X	X	X	X	X	X	X	X	X	X	14
Women's floor	X	X	X	X	X	X	X	X	X	X	X	X	X	X	14
Total	14	14	14	14	14	14	14	14	14	14	14	14	14	14	196

=== Rhythmic ===
Event	74	78	82	86	90	94	98	02	06	10	14	18	22	26	Years
Women's team							X	X	X	X	X	X	X		7
Women's individual all-around						X	X	X	X	X	X	X	X	X	9
Women's group all-around														X	1
Total	0	0	0	0	0	1	2	2	2	2	2	2	2	2	

=== Trampoline ===
Event	74	78	82	86	90	94	98	02	06	10	14	18	22	26	Years
Men's individual									X	X	X	X	X	X	6
Women's individual									X	X	X	X	X	X	6
Total	0	0	0	0	0	0	0	0	2	2	2	2	2	2	

== Medal table ==
Updated after the 2026 Asian Games

Rank	Nation	Gold	Silver	Bronze	Total
1	China (CHN)	159	96	50	305
2	Japan (JPN)	23	50	59	132
3	South Korea (KOR)	22	19	37	78
4	North Korea (PRK)	19	24	28	71
5	Uzbekistan (UZB)	6	12	8	26
6	Kazakhstan (KAZ)	6	9	16	31
7	Chinese Taipei (TPE)	3	1	11	15
8	Hong Kong (HKG)	2	0	1	3
8	Philippines (PHI)	2	0	1	3
10	Thailand (THA)	1	0	0	1
11	Iran (IRI)	0	3	0	3
12	Vietnam (VIE)	0	2	3	5
13	Indonesia (INA)	0	1	1	2
13	Malaysia (MAS)	0	1	1	2
15	India (IND)	0	0	1	1
Totals (15 entries)		243	218	217	678

== Best results by event and nation ==
Event		(China) CHN	(Hong Kong) HKG	(Indonesia) INA	(India) IND	(Iran) IRI	(Japan) JPN	(Kazakhstan) KAZ	(South Korea) KOR	(Malaysia) MAS	(Philippines) PHI	(North Korea) PRK	(Thailand) THA	(Chinese Taipei) TPE	(Uzbekistan) UZB	(Vietnam) VIE
M A G
M A G	Team	1st place, gold medalist(s)					1st place, gold medalist(s)		2nd place, silver medalist(s)			3rd place, bronze medalist(s)		3rd place, bronze medalist(s)		
M A G	Individual All-Around	1st place, gold medalist(s)					1st place, gold medalist(s)		2nd place, silver medalist(s)			3rd place, bronze medalist(s)				
M A G	Floor exercise	1st place, gold medalist(s)			3rd place, bronze medalist(s)		1st place, gold medalist(s)	2nd place, silver medalist(s)	1st place, gold medalist(s)		1st place, gold medalist(s)	2nd place, silver medalist(s)				
M A G	Pommel Horse	1st place, gold medalist(s)				2nd place, silver medalist(s)	1st place, gold medalist(s)	3rd place, bronze medalist(s)	1st place, gold medalist(s)			1st place, gold medalist(s)		1st place, gold medalist(s)	1st place, gold medalist(s)	
M A G	Rings	1st place, gold medalist(s)					2nd place, silver medalist(s)	3rd place, bronze medalist(s)	1st place, gold medalist(s)			1st place, gold medalist(s)	1st place, gold medalist(s)	3rd place, bronze medalist(s)		2nd place, silver medalist(s)
M A G	Vault	1st place, gold medalist(s)	1st place, gold medalist(s)	3rd place, bronze medalist(s)		2nd place, silver medalist(s)	1st place, gold medalist(s)	3rd place, bronze medalist(s)	1st place, gold medalist(s)	2nd place, silver medalist(s)	1st place, gold medalist(s)	1st place, gold medalist(s)		3rd place, bronze medalist(s)		
M A G	Parallel Bars	1st place, gold medalist(s)					1st place, gold medalist(s)	2nd place, silver medalist(s)	1st place, gold medalist(s)			2nd place, silver medalist(s)			2nd place, silver medalist(s)	3rd place, bronze medalist(s)
M A G	Horizontal Bar	1st place, gold medalist(s)					1st place, gold medalist(s)	3rd place, bronze medalist(s)	1st place, gold medalist(s)		3rd place, bronze medalist(s)	1st place, gold medalist(s)		1st place, gold medalist(s)		
W A G
W A G	Team	1st place, gold medalist(s)					2nd place, silver medalist(s)	3rd place, bronze medalist(s)	2nd place, silver medalist(s)			2nd place, silver medalist(s)			3rd place, bronze medalist(s)	
W A G	Individual All-Around	1st place, gold medalist(s)					1st place, gold medalist(s)	2nd place, silver medalist(s)	3rd place, bronze medalist(s)			3rd place, bronze medalist(s)			2nd place, silver medalist(s)	
W A G	Vault	1st place, gold medalist(s)					1st place, gold medalist(s)	3rd place, bronze medalist(s)	1st place, gold medalist(s)			1st place, gold medalist(s)			1st place, gold medalist(s)	3rd place, bronze medalist(s)
W A G	Uneven Bars	1st place, gold medalist(s)					2nd place, silver medalist(s)		1st place, gold medalist(s)			1st place, gold medalist(s)			3rd place, bronze medalist(s)	
W A G	Balance Beam	1st place, gold medalist(s)					1st place, gold medalist(s)	3rd place, bronze medalist(s)	1st place, gold medalist(s)			1st place, gold medalist(s)		3rd place, bronze medalist(s)	2nd place, silver medalist(s)	2nd place, silver medalist(s)
W A G	Floor exercise	1st place, gold medalist(s)		2nd place, silver medalist(s)			1st place, gold medalist(s)	3rd place, bronze medalist(s)	2nd place, silver medalist(s)			1st place, gold medalist(s)			1st place, gold medalist(s)	
R G
R G	Individual All-Around	1st place, gold medalist(s)					1st place, gold medalist(s)	1st place, gold medalist(s)	1st place, gold medalist(s)			2nd place, silver medalist(s)			1st place, gold medalist(s)	
R G	Team	1st place, gold medalist(s)					2nd place, silver medalist(s)	1st place, gold medalist(s)	2nd place, silver medalist(s)						1st place, gold medalist(s)	
T R	Men's Individual	1st place, gold medalist(s)					3rd place, bronze medalist(s)	2nd place, silver medalist(s)								
T R	Women's Individual	1st place, gold medalist(s)					2nd place, silver medalist(s)	3rd place, bronze medalist(s)							3rd place, bronze medalist(s)	

== See also ==
- Asian Gymnastics Championships
