= Gymnastics at the 2010 Asian Games – Women's floor =

Women's floor at the 2010 Asian Games
- Venue: Asian Games Town Gymnasium
- Date: 14–17 November 2010
- Competitors: 33 from 12 nations

Medalists
gold medal	Sui Lu	China
silver medal	Mai Yamagishi	Japan
bronze medal	Jo Hyun-joo	South Korea

The women's floor competition at the 2010 Asian Games in Guangzhou, China was held on 14 and 17 November 2010 at the Asian Games Town Gymnasium.

== Schedule ==
All times are China Standard Time (UTC+08:00)

Date	Time	Event
Sunday, 14 November 2010	09:30	Qualification
Wednesday, 17 November 2010	20:20	Final

== Results ==
=== Qualification ===
Rank	Athlete	Score
1	Sui Lu (CHN)	14.500
2	Huang Qiushuang (CHN)	13.900
3	He Kexin (CHN)	13.700
4	Yang Yilin (CHN)	13.600
5	Rie Tanaka (JPN)	13.350
6	Mai Yamagishi (JPN)	13.350
7	Darya Elizarova (UZB)	13.300
8	Đỗ Thị Ngân Thương (VIE)	13.250
9	Jiang Yuyuan (CHN)	13.050
10	Kyoko Oshima (JPN)	13.000
11	Luiza Galiulina (UZB)	12.950
12	Jo Hyun-joo (KOR)	12.800
13	Phan Thị Hà Thanh (VIE)	12.500
14	Asal Saparbaeva (UZB)	12.350
15	Moon Eun-mee (KOR)	12.050
16	Đỗ Thị Thu Huyền (VIE)	12.050
17	Tracie Ang (MAS)	12.000
18	Koko Tsurumi (JPN)	11.950
19	Lim Heem Wei (SIN)	11.900
20	Park Eun-kyung (KOR)	11.850
21	Yuliya Goreva (UZB)	11.800
22	Momoko Ozawa (JPN)	11.650
23	Irina Volodchenko (UZB)	11.350
24	Park Ji-yeon (KOR)	11.150
25	Angel Wong (HKG)	11.050
26	Dipa Karmakar (IND)	10.900
27	Kim Ye-eun (KOR)	10.800
28	Al-Jazy Al-Habshi (QAT)	10.650
29	Krystal Khoo (SIN)	10.400
30	Mananchaya Senklang (THA)	9.400
31	Meenakshi (IND)	9.350
32	Frances Audrey Muñoz (PHI)	9.300
33	Priti Das (IND)	8.250

=== Final ===
Rank	Athlete	Score
1st place, gold medalist(s)	Sui Lu (CHN)	14.700
2nd place, silver medalist(s)	Mai Yamagishi (JPN)	13.625
3rd place, bronze medalist(s)	Jo Hyun-joo (KOR)	13.450
4	Rie Tanaka (JPN)	13.400
5	Huang Qiushuang (CHN)	12.975
6	Luiza Galiulina (UZB)	12.800
7	Đỗ Thị Ngân Thương (VIE)	12.650
8	Darya Elizarova (UZB)	12.400
