= Gymnastics at the 2010 Asian Games =

- Venue: Asian Games Town Gymnasium
- Dates: 13–26 November 2010
- Competitors: 172 from 24 nations

Gymnastics at the 2010 Asian Games was held at the Asian Games Town Gymnasium in Guangzhou, China from November 13 to 26, 2010.

== Schedule ==
Q	Qualification	F	Final

Event↓/Date →	13th Sat	14th Sun	15th Mon	16th Tue	17th Wed	18th Thu	19th Fri	20th Sat	21st Sun	22nd Mon	23rd Tue	24th Wed	25th Thu	26th Fri
Artistic
Men's team	F													
Men's individual all-around	Q		F											
Men's floor	Q			F										
Men's pommel horse	Q			F										
Men's rings	Q			F										
Men's vault	Q				F									
Men's parallel bars	Q				F									
Men's horizontal bar	Q				F									
Women's team		F												
Women's individual all-around		Q	F											
Women's vault		Q		F										
Women's uneven bars		Q		F										
Women's balance beam		Q			F									
Women's floor		Q			F									
Rhythmic
Women's team													F	
Women's individual all-around													Q	F
Trampoline
Men's individual									Q	F				
Women's individual									Q	F				

== Medalists ==
=== Men's artistic ===
Event	Gold	Silver	Bronze
Team	China; Chen Yibing; Feng Zhe; Lü Bo; Teng Haibin; Yan Mingyong; Zhang Chenglong	Japan; Ryosuke Baba; Ryotaka Deguchi; Shun Kuwahara; Hisashi Mizutori; Takuya Nakase; Kyoichi Watanabe	South Korea; Kim Hee-hoon; Kim Ji-hoon; Kim Soo-myun; Sin Seob; Yang Hak-seon; Yoo Won-chul
Individual all-around	Teng Haibin; China	Lü Bo; China	Hisashi Mizutori; Japan
Floor	Zhang Chenglong; China	Shared gold	Ashish Kumar; India
Floor	Kim Soo-myun; South Korea	Shared gold	Ashish Kumar; India
Pommel horse	Teng Haibin; China	Yan Mingyong; China	Huang Che-kuei; Chinese Taipei
Rings	Chen Yibing; China	Yan Mingyong; China	Chen Chih-yu; Chinese Taipei
Vault	Yang Hak-seon; South Korea	Feng Zhe; China	Stanislav Valiyev; Kazakhstan
Parallel bars	Feng Zhe; China	Anton Fokin; Uzbekistan	Ildar Valeyev; Kazakhstan
Horizontal bar	Zhang Chenglong; China	Shun Kuwahara; Japan	Teng Haibin; China

=== Women's artistic ===
Event	Gold	Silver	Bronze
Team	China; Deng Linlin; He Kexin; Huang Qiushuang; Jiang Yuyuan; Sui Lu; Yang Yilin	Japan; Kyoko Oshima; Momoko Ozawa; Yuko Shintake; Rie Tanaka; Koko Tsurumi; Mai Yamagishi	Uzbekistan; Darya Elizarova; Luiza Galiulina; Yuliya Goreva; Diana Karimdjanova; Asal Saparbaeva; Irina Volodchenko
Individual all-around	Sui Lu; China	Huang Qiushuang; China	Rie Tanaka; Japan
Vault	Huang Qiushuang; China	Rie Tanaka; Japan	Momoko Ozawa; Japan
Uneven bars	He Kexin; China	Huang Qiushuang; China	Koko Tsurumi; Japan
Balance beam	Sui Lu; China	Deng Linlin; China	Luiza Galiulina; Uzbekistan
Floor	Sui Lu; China	Mai Yamagishi; Japan	Jo Hyun-joo; South Korea

=== Rhythmic ===
Event	Gold	Silver	Bronze
Team	Kazakhstan; Anna Alyabyeva; Mizana Ismailova; Madina Mukanova; Marina Petrakova	Uzbekistan; Djamila Rakhmatova; Zamirajon Sanokulova; Ulyana Trofimova	Japan; Riko Anakubo; Natsuki Konishi; Yuria Onuki; Runa Yamaguchi
Individual all-around	Anna Alyabyeva; Kazakhstan	Ulyana Trofimova; Uzbekistan	Son Yeon-jae; South Korea

=== Trampoline ===
Event	Gold	Silver	Bronze
Men's individual	Dong Dong; China	Tu Xiao; China	Tetsuya Sotomura; Japan
Women's individual	Huang Shanshan; China	He Wenna; China	Ekaterina Khilko; Uzbekistan

== Medal table ==
Rank	Nation	Gold	Silver	Bronze	Total
1	China (CHN)	15	9	1	25
2	South Korea (KOR)	2	0	3	5
3	Kazakhstan (KAZ)	2	0	2	4
4	Japan (JPN)	0	5	6	11
5	Uzbekistan (UZB)	0	3	3	6
6	Chinese Taipei (TPE)	0	0	2	2
7	India (IND)	0	0	1	1
Totals (7 entries)		19	17	18	54

== Participating nations ==
A total of 172 athletes from 24 nations competed in gymnastics at the 2010 Asian Games:

- Athletes from Kuwait (8)
- China (20)
- Chinese Taipei (6)
- Hong Kong (4)
- India (9)
- Iran (6)
- Iraq (1)
- Japan (19)
- Kazakhstan (11)
- Kyrgyzstan (3)
- Lebanon (1)
- Malaysia (4)
- Mongolia (1)
- Nepal (4)
- Philippines (2)
- Qatar (6)
- Saudi Arabia (5)
- Singapore (4)
- South Korea (16)
- Sri Lanka (2)
- Thailand (11)
- Uzbekistan (18)
- Vietnam (9)
- Yemen (2)
