= Gymnastics at the 2010 Asian Games – Women's artistic team =

2010 Asian Games event

Women's team at the 2010 Asian Games
- Venue: Asian Games Town Gymnasium
- Date: 14 November 2010
- Competitors: 24 from 4 nations

Medalists
gold medal	China; Deng Linlin, He Kexin, Huang Qiushuang, Jiang Yuyuan, Sui Lu, Yang Yilin
silver medal	Japan; Kyoko Oshima, Momoko Ozawa, Yuko Shintake, Rie Tanaka, Koko Tsurumi, Mai Yamagishi
bronze medal	Uzbekistan; Darya Elizarova, Luiza Galiulina, Yuliya Goreva, Diana Karimdjanova, Asal Saparbaeva, Irina Volodchenko

The women's artistic team competition at the 2010 Asian Games in Guangzhou, China was held on 14 November 2010 at the Asian Games Town Gymnasium. The competition also served as qualification for the individual event finals.

== Schedule ==
All times are China Standard Time (UTC+08:00)

Date	Time	Event
Sunday, 14 November 2010	09:30	Final

== Results ==
Rank	Team	Vault (gymnastics)	Uneven bars	Balance beam	Floor (gymnastics)	Total
1st place, gold medalist(s)	China (CHN)	59.450	61.300	57.700	55.700	234.150
	Deng Linlin	14.350		14.650		
	He Kexin		16.100		13.700	
	Huang Qiushuang	15.300	15.850	13.950	13.900	
	Jiang Yuyuan	14.850	14.400	~~13.450~~	~~13.050~~	
	Sui Lu	~~13.700~~	~~14.050~~	15.300	14.500	
	Yang Yilin	14.950	14.950	13.800	13.600	
2nd place, silver medalist(s)	Japan (JPN)	57.950	57.150	56.500	51.650	223.250
	Kyoko Oshima	13.950	14.150	~~13.500~~	13.000	
	Momoko Ozawa	15.050	~~11.350~~		~~11.650~~	
	Yuko Shintake		14.200	14.250		
	Rie Tanaka	14.750	14.350	14.000	13.350	
	Koko Tsurumi	~~13.850~~	14.450	13.900	11.950	
	Mai Yamagishi	14.200		14.350	13.350	
3rd place, bronze medalist(s)	Uzbekistan (UZB)	53.750	50.750	53.050	50.400	207.950
	Darya Elizarova	13.700	13.550	13.600	13.300	
	Luiza Galiulina	13.300	13.300	14.250	12.950	
	Yuliya Goreva	13.200			11.800	
	Diana Karimdjanova		~~11.750~~	12.400		
	Asal Saparbaeva	~~12.900~~	11.850	~~12.200~~	12.350	
	Irina Volodchenko	13.550	12.050	12.800	~~11.350~~	
4	South Korea (KOR)	55.950	51.800	51.250	47.850	206.850
	Eum Eun-hui		~~11.850~~			
	Jo Hyun-joo	14.750	12.650	12.150	12.800	
	Kim Ye-eun	13.700	12.500	~~12.000~~	~~10.800~~	
	Moon Eun-mee	~~13.100~~		13.550	12.050	
	Park Eun-kyung	13.750	13.200	12.500	11.850	
	Park Ji-yeon	13.750	13.450	13.050	11.150	
