= Gymnastics at the 2012 Summer Olympics – Women's artistic team all-around =

Women's Artistic Gymnastics Team All-Around at the Games of the XXX Olympiad
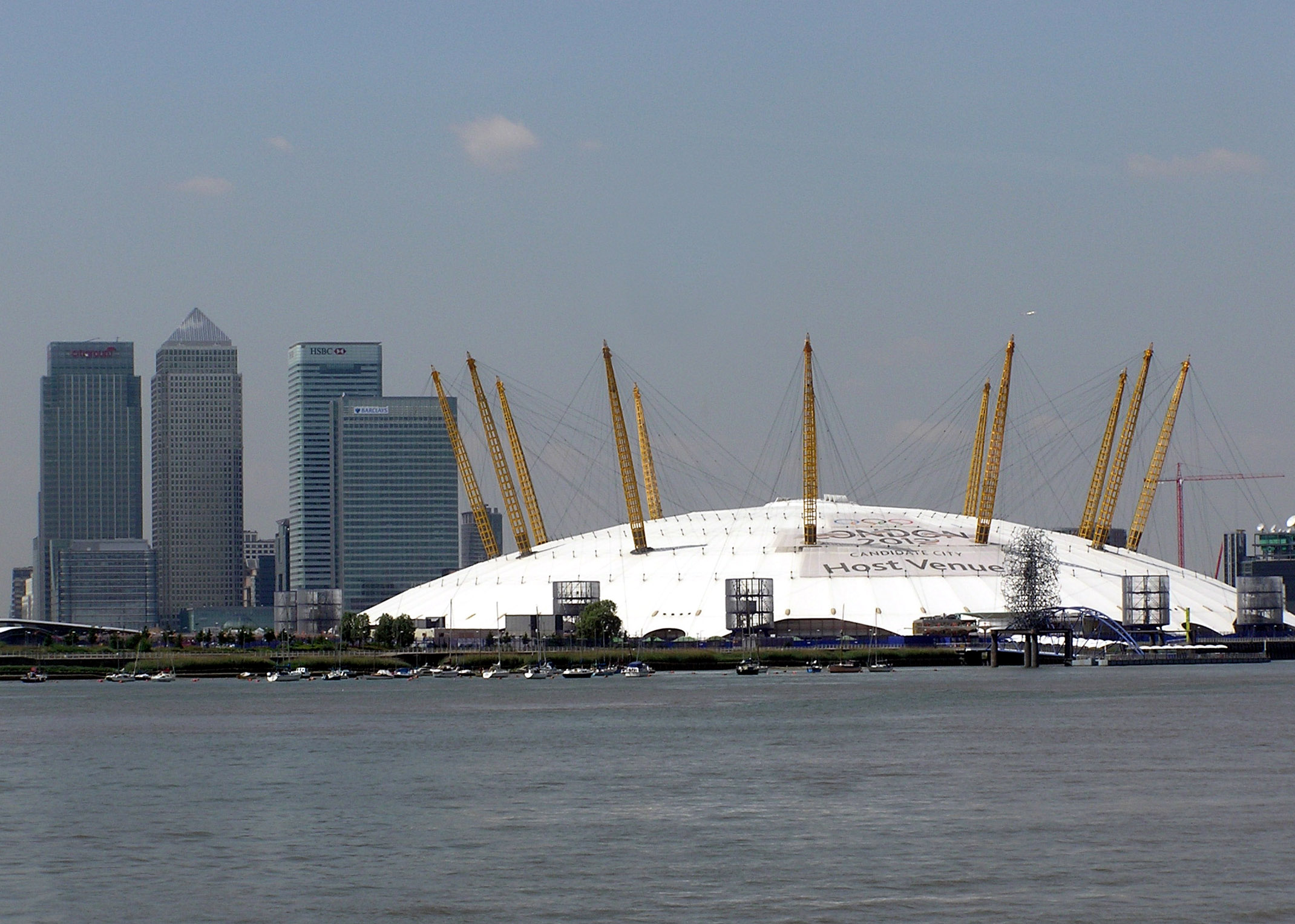
- The Canary Wharf in London

Medalists
1st place, gold medalist(s)		Jordyn Wieber; Gabby Douglas; Aly Raisman; Kyla Ross; McKayla Maroney	United States
2nd place, silver medalist(s)		Aliya Mustafina; Viktoria Komova; Ksenia Afanasyeva; Anastasia Grishina; Maria Paseka	Russia
3rd place, bronze medalist(s)		Cătălina Ponor; Larisa Iordache; Diana Bulimar; Sandra Izbașa; Diana Chelaru	Romania

The final of the women's artistic team all-around competition at the 2012 Summer Olympics was held at the North Greenwich Arena in London on 31 July 2012. Eight teams qualified for the final, from a total of twelve that competed in the qualification round.

Each team was composed of five gymnasts. In the final, each team selected three gymnasts to compete on each apparatus. All three scores on each apparatus were summed to give a final team score.

The United States team known as the Fierce Five won the gold medal in the final, the first Olympic title for the American women's gymnastics team since 1996. Russia won the silver, and Romania won the bronze. It was Romania's 10th consecutive Olympic medal in the event, a streak that started in 1976.

The medals were presented by Habib Macki of Oman, Aïcha Garad Ali of Djibouti, Angela Ruggiero of the United States, and members of the International Olympic Committee. The medalists' bouquets were presented by Slava Corn of Canada, the vice president of the Fédération Internationale de Gymnastique (FIG); Walter Nyffeler of Switzerland; Zobeira Hernandez Delgado of Canada; and members of the FIG Executive Committee.

== Participating teams ==
The following teams qualified for the Olympics by finishing in the top 8 at the 2011 World Artistic Gymnastics Championships:

- United States
- Russia
- China
- Romania
- Japan
- Australia
- Germany
- Great Britain

The following teams qualified by finishing in the top 4 at the 2012 Olympic Test Event, which was open to the teams that had finished 9th through 16th at the 2011 World Championships:

- Italy
- Canada
- France
- Brazil

== Qualification results ==
The top 8 teams in the initial round of competition on 29 July qualified to the team final on 31 July:

Position	Country	Vault (gymnastics)	Uneven bars	Balance beam	Floor (gymnastics)	Total
1	United States	47.633	45.032	45.441	43.757	181.863
2	Russia	46.299	45.566	45.232	43.332	180.429
3	China	43.566	46.998	44.432	41.641	176.637
4	Romania	45.733	41.833	44.699	43.999	176.264
5	Great Britain	43.333	45.158	39.632	42.533	170.656
6	Japan	42.033	44.232	42.765	41.166	170.196
7	Italy	42.466	40.974	42.124	42.833	168.397
8	Canada	43.599	42.699	38.832	42.566	167.696

== Results ==
Rank	Country	Vault (gymnastics)	Uneven bars	Balance beam	Floor (gymnastics)	Total
1st place, gold medalist(s)	United States	48.132 (1)	44.799 (3)	45.299 (1)	45.366 (1)	183.596
1st place, gold medalist(s)	Gabby Douglas	15.966	15.200	15.233	15.066	183.596
1st place, gold medalist(s)	Jordyn Wieber	15.933	14.666		15.000	183.596
1st place, gold medalist(s)	Aly Raisman			14.933	15.300	183.596
1st place, gold medalist(s)	Kyla Ross		14.933	15.133		183.596
1st place, gold medalist(s)	McKayla Maroney	16.233				183.596
2nd place, silver medalist(s)	Russia	46.366 (2)	46.166 (2)	44.399 (3)	41.599 (6)	178.530
2nd place, silver medalist(s)	Aliya Mustafina	15.233	15.700	14.533	14.800	178.530
2nd place, silver medalist(s)	Viktoria Komova	15.833	15.766	15.033		178.530
2nd place, silver medalist(s)	Ksenia Afanasyeva			14.833	14.333	178.530
2nd place, silver medalist(s)	Anastasia Grishina		14.700		12.466	178.530
2nd place, silver medalist(s)	Maria Paseka	15.300				178.530
3rd place, bronze medalist(s)	Romania	45.000 (3)	41.465 (8)	45.249 (2)	44.700 (2)	176.414
3rd place, bronze medalist(s)	Cătălina Ponor	15.100		15.416	14.800	176.414
3rd place, bronze medalist(s)	Larisa Iordache	14.800	13.766	15.300		176.414
3rd place, bronze medalist(s)	Diana Bulimar		14.066	14.533	14.700	176.414
3rd place, bronze medalist(s)	Sandra Izbașa	15.100			15.200	176.414
3rd place, bronze medalist(s)	Diana Chelaru		13.633			176.414
4	China	44.266 (5)	46.399 (1)	42.932 (4)	40.833 (7)	174.430
4	Huang Qiushuang	15.033	15.100	13.800	12.500	174.430
4	Deng Linlin	14.900		13.766	13.733	174.430
4	Sui Lu			15.366	14.600	174.430
4	Yao Jinnan	14.333	15.533			174.430
4	He Kexin		15.766			174.430
5	Canada	44.499 (4)	42.332 (6)	41.199 (6)	42.774 (3)	170.804
5	Ellie Black	15.233		14.266	14.208	170.804
5	Dominique Pegg	14.400		13.500	13.966	170.804
5	Brittany Rogers	14.866	14.466			170.804
5	Victoria Moors		13.700		14.600	170.804
5	Kristina Vaculik		14.166	13.433		170.804
6	Great Britain	43.965 (6)	44.599 (4)	39.199 (8)	42.732 (4)	170.495
6	Hannah Whelan		14.000	13.866	14.200	170.495
6	Jennifer Pinches	14.833		11.833	14.366	170.495
6	Beth Tweddle		15.833		14.166	170.495
6	Rebecca Tunney	14.866	14.766			170.495
6	Imogen Cairns	14.266		13.500		170.495
7	Italy	42.366 (8)	41.666 (7)	41.999 (5)	41.899 (5)	167.930
7	Vanessa Ferrari	14.333	14.166	14.800	13.566	167.930
7	Carlotta Ferlito	14.300		14.366	14.100	167.930
7	Erika Fasana	13.733	13.600		14.233	167.930
7	Giorgia Campana		13.900			167.930
7	Elisabetta Preziosa			12.833		167.930
8	Japan	42.882 (7)	42.999 (5)	40.599 (7)	40.166 (8)	166.646
8	Asuka Teramoto	14.700	14.200	14.233	13.900	166.646
8	Rie Tanaka	14.416	14.333		12.833	166.646
8	Kōko Tsurumi	13.766	14.466			166.646
8	Yuko Shintake			13.266	13.433	166.646
8	Yu Minobe			13.100		166.646
