= Gymnastics at the 2010 Asian Games – Women's vault =

Women's vault at the 2010 Asian Games
- Venue: Asian Games Town Gymnasium
- Date: 14–16 November 2010
- Competitors: 14 from 10 nations

Medalists
gold medal	Huang Qiushuang	China
silver medal	Rie Tanaka	Japan
bronze medal	Momoko Ozawa	Japan

The women's vault competition at the 2010 Asian Games in Guangzhou, China was held on 14 and 16 November 2010 at the Asian Games Town Gymnasium.

== Schedule ==
All times are China Standard Time (UTC+08:00)

Date	Time	Event
Sunday, 14 November 2010	09:30	Qualification
Tuesday, 16 November 2010	20:10	Final

== Results ==
=== Qualification ===
Rank	Athlete	Vault 1	Vault 2	Total
1	Huang Qiushuang (CHN)	15.300	14.500	14.900
2	Jo Hyun-joo (KOR)	14.750	14.600	14.675
3	Rie Tanaka (JPN)	14.750	14.200	14.475
4	Phan Thị Hà Thanh (VIE)	14.000	14.650	14.325
5	Momoko Ozawa (JPN)	15.050	13.500	14.275
6	Angel Wong (HKG)	13.400	14.150	13.775
7	Đỗ Thị Ngân Thương (VIE)	13.650	13.800	13.725
8	Dipa Karmakar (IND)	13.850	13.300	13.575
9	Lim Heem Wei (SIN)	13.550	13.550	13.550
10	Yuliya Goreva (UZB)	13.200	13.600	13.400
11	Tracie Ang (MAS)	12.550	13.600	13.075
12	Mananchaya Senklang (THA)	12.650	12.300	12.475
13	Meenakshi (IND)	12.150	11.700	11.925
14	Priti Das (IND)	11.150	12.100	11.625

=== Final ===
Rank	Athlete	Vault 1	Vault 2	Total
1st place, gold medalist(s)	Huang Qiushuang (CHN)	15.200	14.375	14.787
2nd place, silver medalist(s)	Rie Tanaka (JPN)	14.500	13.975	14.237
3rd place, bronze medalist(s)	Momoko Ozawa (JPN)	14.450	13.775	14.112
4	Jo Hyun-joo (KOR)	13.300	14.500	13.900
5	Phan Thị Hà Thanh (VIE)	13.500	14.050	13.775
6	Angel Wong (HKG)	13.425	14.000	13.712
7	Đỗ Thị Ngân Thương (VIE)	13.725	13.425	13.575
8	Dipa Karmakar (IND)	13.750	13.050	13.400
