= 2008 Asian Artistic Gymnastics Championships =

International gymnastics competition

- Host city: Doha, Qatar
- Dates: 15–18 November 2008
- Main venue: Aspire Dome

The 2008 Asian Artistic Gymnastics Championships were the 4th edition of the Asian Artistic Gymnastics Championships, and were held in Doha, Qatar from November 15 to November 18, 2008.

== Medal summary ==
=== Men ===
Event	Gold	Silver	Bronze
Team	Japan; Naoyuki Terao; Koji Yamamuro; Yosuke Hoshi; Shoichi Yamamoto; Ryosuke Baba; Go Tagashira	South Korea; Kim Soo-myun; Ha Chang-ju; Shin Hyung-ok; Lee Sang-wook; Kim Sang-woo; Yoo Jin-wook	North Korea; Ro Chol-jin; Kim Jin-hyok; Ri Se-gwang; Kim Kyong-hak; Ri Chol-jin
Individual all-around	Koji Yamamuro; Japan	Yosuke Hoshi; Japan	Kim Soo-myun; South Korea
Floor	Kim Soo-myun; South Korea	Koji Yamamuro; Japan	Ha Chang-ju; South Korea
Pommel horse	Ha Chang-ju; South Korea	Kim Soo-myun; South Korea	Yosuke Hoshi; Japan
Rings	Timur Kurbanbayev; Kazakhstan	Koji Yamamuro; Japan	Ali Al-Asi; Jordan
Vault	Ri Se-gwang; North Korea	Go Tagashira; Japan	Stanislav Valiyev; Kazakhstan
Parallel bars	Yosuke Hoshi; Japan	Shared gold	Kim Jin-hyok; North Korea
Parallel bars	Ildar Valeyev; Kazakhstan	Shared gold	Kim Jin-hyok; North Korea
Horizontal bar	Yosuke Hoshi; Japan	Ryosuke Baba; Japan	Ro Chol-jin; North Korea

=== Women ===
Event	Gold	Silver	Bronze
Team	Japan; Koko Tsurumi; Miki Uemura; Yu Minobe; Rie Tanaka; Kyoko Oshima; Yuko Shintake	South Korea; Park Eun-kyung; Han Byul; Jo Hyun-joo; Park Ha-yan; Han Eun-bi; Kim Da-eun	Singapore; Lim Heem Wei; Nicole Tay; Tabitha Tay; Sarah Ng
Individual all-around	Koko Tsurumi; Japan	Kim Un-hyang; North Korea	Miki Uemura; Japan
Vault	Kang Yong-mi; North Korea	Angel Wong; Hong Kong	Phan Thị Hà Thanh; Vietnam
Uneven bars	Koko Tsurumi; Japan	Kim Un-hyang; North Korea	Miki Uemura; Japan
Balance beam	Park Eun-kyung; South Korea	Yu Minobe; Japan	Kim Un-hyang; North Korea
Floor	Koko Tsurumi; Japan	Kim Un-hyang; North Korea	Yuko Shintake; Japan
Floor	Koko Tsurumi; Japan	Kim Un-hyang; North Korea	Kang Yong-mi; North Korea

== Medal table ==
Rank	Nation	Gold	Silver	Bronze	Total
1	Japan	8	6	4	18
2	South Korea	3	3	2	8
3	North Korea	2	3	5	10
4	Kazakhstan	2	0	1	3
5	Hong Kong	0	1	0	1
6	Jordan	0	0	1	1
6	Singapore	0	0	1	1
6	Vietnam	0	0	1	1
Totals (8 entries)		15	13	15	43

== Participating nations ==
129 athletes from 20 nations competed.

- Chinese Taipei (8)
- Hong Kong (4)
- India (12)
- Iran (6)
- Iraq (5)
- Japan (12)
- Jordan (3)
- Kazakhstan (7)
- Kuwait (3)
- Malaysia (4)
- North Korea (8)
- Qatar (2)
- Saudi Arabia (2)
- Singapore (4)
- South Korea (12)
- Sri Lanka (11)
- Syria (6)
- Thailand (10)
- Uzbekistan (4)
- Vietnam (6)
