= Gymnastics at the 2010 Asian Games – Men's vault =

Women's vault at the 2010 Asian Games
- Venue: Asian Games Town Gymnasium
- Date: 13–17 November 2010
- Competitors: 26 from 16 nations

Medalists
gold medal	Yang Hak-seon	South Korea
silver medal	Feng Zhe	China
bronze medal	Stanislav Valiyev	Kazakhstan

The men's vault competition at the 2010 Asian Games in Guangzhou, China was held on 13 and 17 November 2010 at the Asian Games Town Gymnasium.

== Schedule ==
All times are China Standard Time (UTC+08:00)

Date	Time	Event
Saturday, 13 November 2010	09:30	Qualification
Wednesday, 17 November 2010	19:30	Final

== Results ==
=== Qualification ===
Rank	Athlete	Vault 1	Vault 2	Total
1	Yang Hak-seon (KOR)	16.400	16.600	16.500
2	Stanislav Valiyev (KAZ)	16.400	16.050	16.225
3	Feng Zhe (CHN)	16.400	15.700	16.050
4	Yernar Yerimbetov (KAZ)	16.400	15.600	16.000
5	Zhang Chenglong (CHN)	16.050	15.900	15.975
6	Kim Hee-hoon (KOR)	16.050	15.750	15.900
7	Shek Wai Hung (HKG)	16.050	15.650	15.850
8	Đặng Nam (VIE)	15.900	15.750	15.825
9	Mohammad Ramezanpour (IRI)	15.950	15.300	15.625
10	Nashwan Al-Harazi (YEM)	15.600	15.550	15.575
11	Ryosuke Baba (JPN)	15.800	15.300	15.550
12	Nguyễn Hà Thanh (VIE)	15.350	15.750	15.550
13	Ashish Kumar (IND)	16.100	14.900	15.500
14	Nasser Al-Hamad (QAT)	15.100	15.650	15.375
15	Rartchawat Kaewpanya (THA)	15.750	14.750	15.250
16	Ganbatyn Erdenebold (MGL)	15.100	15.400	15.250
17	Mayank Srivastava (IND)	15.200	15.200	15.200
18	Hầu Trung Linh (VIE)	14.700	15.250	14.975
19	Ng Kiu Chung (HKG)	15.650	13.900	14.775
20	Ali Saadi (IRQ)	14.700	14.800	14.750
21	Lum Wan Foong (MAS)	14.800	13.850	14.325
22	Mohammed Sharif (YEM)	15.200	13.250	14.225
23	Ismail Shabi (KSA)	14.450	13.300	13.875
24	Ali Al-Khwaher (KSA)	14.050	12.900	13.475
25	Jasem Gazwi (KSA)	13.650	12.900	13.275
26	Mohamad Ibrahim Shami (LIB)	15.400	0.000	7.700

=== Final ===
Rank	Athlete	Vault 1	Vault 2	Total
1st place, gold medalist(s)	Yang Hak-seon (KOR)	16.400	16.400	16.400
2nd place, silver medalist(s)	Feng Zhe (CHN)	15.525	16.175	15.850
3rd place, bronze medalist(s)	Stanislav Valiyev (KAZ)	16.000	15.600	15.800
4	Yernar Yerimbetov (KAZ)	15.525	15.525	15.525
5	Kim Hee-hoon (KOR)	15.875	15.050	15.462
6	Zhang Chenglong (CHN)	15.250	15.600	15.425
6	Shek Wai Hung (HKG)	15.850	15.000	15.425
8	Đặng Nam (VIE)	15.150	14.700	14.925
