= Gymnastics at the 2010 Asian Games – Women's trampoline =

Women's individual at the 2010 Asian Games
- Venue: Asian Games Town Gymnasium
- Date: 21–22 November 2010
- Competitors: 5 from 3 nations

Medalists
gold medal	Huang Shanshan	China
silver medal	He Wenna	China
bronze medal	Ekaterina Khilko	Uzbekistan

The women's individual trampoline competition at the 2010 Asian Games in Guangzhou, China was held on 21 and 22 November 2010 at the Asian Games Town Gymnasium.

== Schedule ==
All times are China Standard Time (UTC+08:00)

Date	Time	Event
Sunday, 21 November 2010	11:00	Qualification
Monday, 22 November 2010	16:00	Final

== Results ==
=== Qualification ===
Rank	Athlete	Score
1	He Wenna (CHN)	71.80
2	Huang Shanshan (CHN)	71.40
3	Ekaterina Khilko (UZB)	69.60
4	Ayana Yamada (JPN)	66.40
5	Anna Savkina (UZB)	59.60

=== Final ===
Rank	Athlete	Score
1st place, gold medalist(s)	Huang Shanshan (CHN)	41.40
2nd place, silver medalist(s)	He Wenna (CHN)	40.90
3rd place, bronze medalist(s)	Ekaterina Khilko (UZB)	39.50
4	Anna Savkina (UZB)	39.20
5	Ayana Yamada (JPN)	37.10
