= Gymnastics at the 2010 Asian Games – Men's trampoline =

Men's individual at the 2010 Asian Games
- Venue: Asian Games Town Gymnasium
- Date: 21–22 November 2010
- Competitors: 9 from 6 nations

Medalists
gold medal	Dong Dong	China
silver medal	Tu Xiao	China
bronze medal	Tetsuya Sotomura	Japan

The men's individual trampoline competition at the 2010 Asian Games in Guangzhou, China was held on 21 and 22 November 2010 at the Asian Games Town Gymnasium.

== Schedule ==
All times are China Standard Time (UTC+08:00)

Date	Time	Event
Sunday, 21 November 2010	11:00	Qualification
Monday, 22 November 2010	16:00	Final

== Results ==
Legend

- DNF — Did not finish

=== Qualification ===
Rank	Athlete	Score
1	Dong Dong (CHN)	76.20
2	Tu Xiao (CHN)	75.90
3	Masaki Ito (JPN)	74.90
4	Tetsuya Sotomura (JPN)	73.90
5	Marat Mustafin (UZB)	66.70
6	Faraj Al-Hamad (QAT)	63.80
7	Yernur Syzdyk (KAZ)	39.20
8	Saleh Al-Khadheir (IOC)	23.00
—	Yousef Al-Qattan (IOC)	DNF

=== Final ===
Rank	Athlete	Score
1st place, gold medalist(s)	Dong Dong (CHN)	44.50
2nd place, silver medalist(s)	Tu Xiao (CHN)	43.80
3rd place, bronze medalist(s)	Tetsuya Sotomura (JPN)	42.40
4	Masaki Ito (JPN)	41.90
5	Yernur Syzdyk (KAZ)	37.10
6	Faraj Al-Hamad (QAT)	34.80
7	Saleh Al-Khadheir (IOC)	22.50
8	Marat Mustafin (UZB)	11.80
