= Luiza Galiulina =

Uzbekistani artistic gymnast (born 1992)

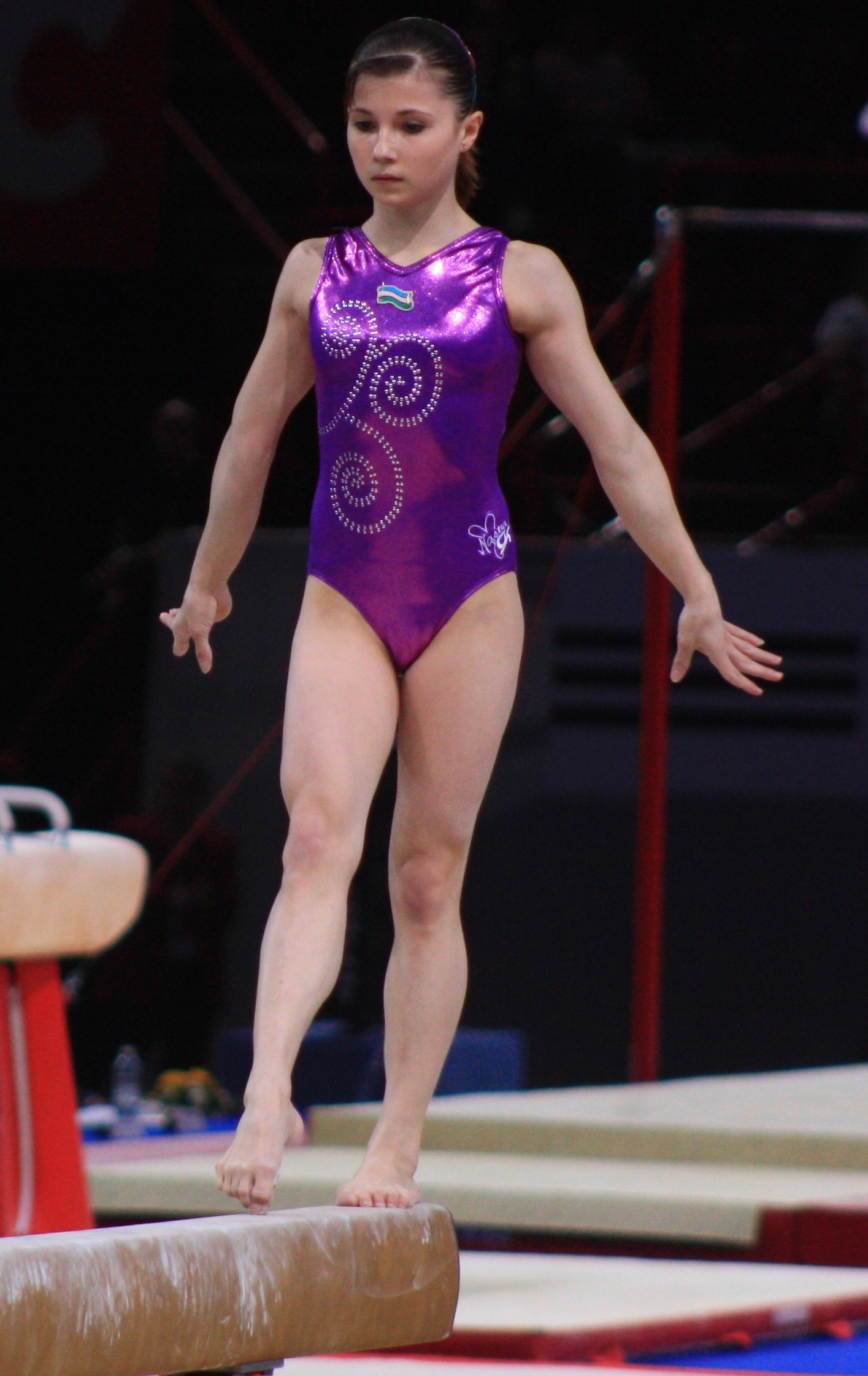
- Galiulina on the balance beam in 2010

Personal information
- Alternative name: Luisa Galiulina
- Born: 23 June 1992 (age 34) Tashkent, Uzbekistan
- Height: 1.45 m (4 ft 9 in)

Gymnastics career
- Discipline: Women's artistic gymnastics
- Country represented: Uzbekistan
- Retired: 2012
Medal record
Representing Uzbekistan
Asian Games
Bronze medal – third place	2010 Guangzhou	Team
Bronze medal – third place	2010 Guangzhou	Balance beam

Luiza Galiulina (Russian: Луиза Галиулина; born 23 June 1992) is an Uzbek former artistic gymnast. She won two bronze medals at the 2010 Asian Games and represented Uzbekistan at the 2008 Summer Olympics. She was banned from international competition for two years after testing positive for furosemide during the 2012 Summer Olympics.

== Gymnastics career ==
Galiulina competed at her first World Championships in 2007 and finished 87th in the all-around qualifications. She represented Uzbekistan at the 2008 Summer Olympics and placed 59th in all-around qualifications. She placed 44th in the all-around qualifications at the 2009 World Championships.

Galiulina won a gold medal on the balance beam at the 2010 Moscow World Cup. She then helped Uzbekistan place 24th in the team competition at the 2010 World Championships, and individually, she placed 45th in the all-around. She then represented Uzbekistan at the 2010 Asian Games, helping the team win the bronze medal. Galiulina won another bronze medal in the balance beam final, behind Sui Lu and Deng Linlin.

At the 2011 Ghent World Challenge Cup, Galiulina tied with Stefani Bismpikou for the bronze medal on the balance beam. She then competed at the 2011 World Championships and finished 60th in the all-around qualifications.

Galiulina won a silver medal on the floor exercise at the 2012 Cottbus World Cup, behind Diana Chelaru. She competed at the 2012 Olympic Test Event and finished 52nd in the all-around, earning Uzbekistan an Olympic berth that could go to her or Darya Elizarova.

=== Doping and ban ===
Galiulina was selected to represent Uzbekistan at the 2012 Summer Olympics and traveled to London. However, on 25 July, during pre-competition doping testing, she tested positive for the banned diuretic drug furosemide. As a result, she was provisionally suspended. After her B sample also tested positive, the International Olympic Committee officially excluded her from the Olympic Games. The International Gymnastics Federation initially banned her from competition for six months; however, the World Anti-Doping Agency (WADA) appealed this decision. The Court of Arbitration for Sport upheld WADA's appeal and imposed a 2-year competition ban effective 1 August 2012.

Galiulina did not return to competition after her ban ended.

== See also ==
- List of Olympic female artistic gymnasts for Uzbekistan
