= Deng Linlin =

Chinese artistic gymnast

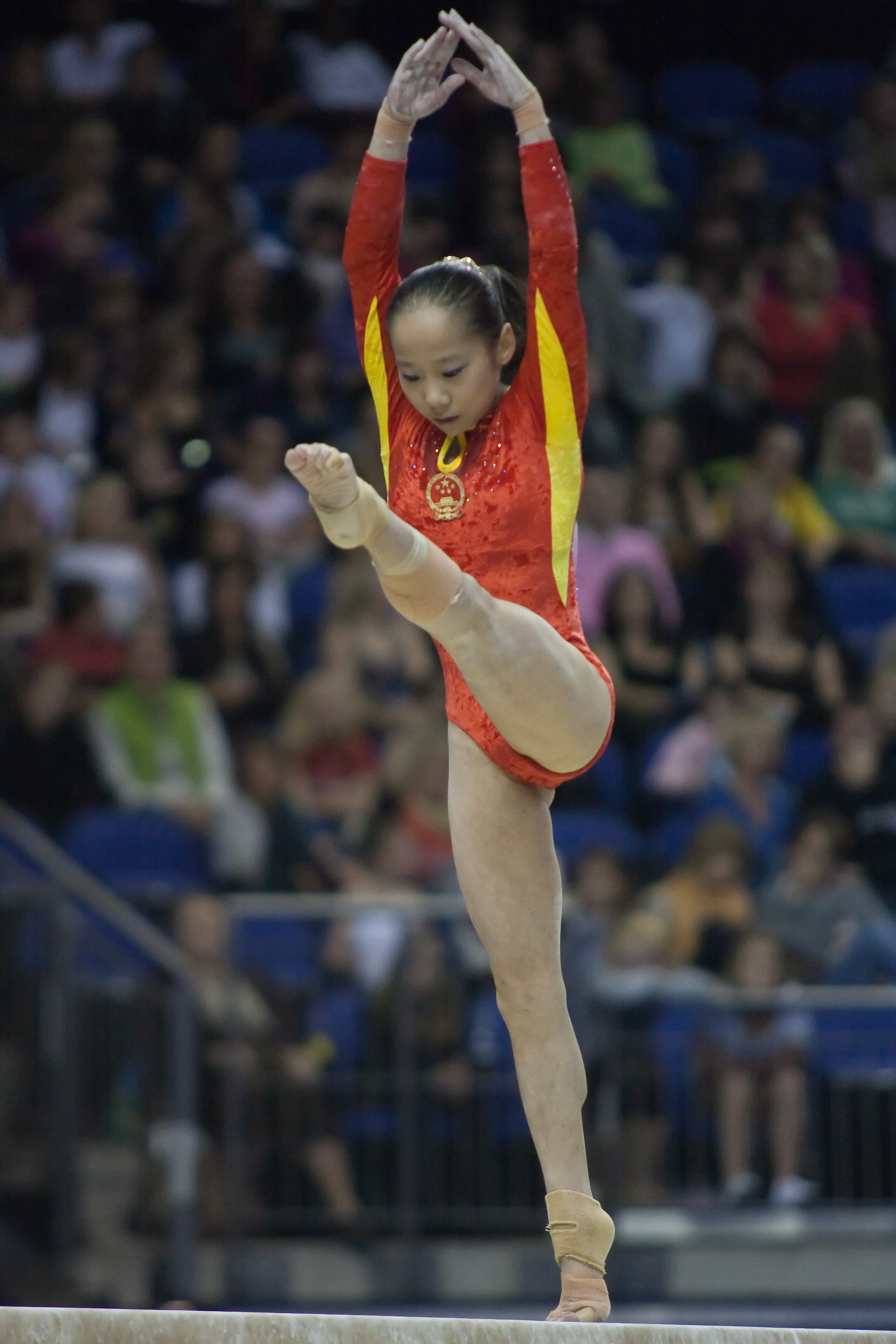
- Linlin at the Artistic Gymnastics World Championships in 2009

Personal information
- Full name: Deng Linlin
- Born: April 21, 1992 (age 34) Lixin, Anhui, China
- Height: 146 cm (4 ft 9 in)

Gymnastics career
- Discipline: Women's artistic gymnastics
- Country represented: China
- Head coach: Xiong Jingbin
- Assistant coach: Zhang Xia
- Retired: September 6, 2013
Medal record
Women's artistic gymnastics
Representing China
Event	1st	2nd	3rd
Olympic Games	2	0	0
World Championships	1	1	1
Asian Games	1	1	0
National Games	1	0	2
Total	5	2	3
Olympic Games
Gold medal – first place	2008 Beijing	Team
Gold medal – first place	2012 London	Balance Beam
World Championships
Gold medal – first place	2009 London	Balance Beam
Silver medal – second place	2010 Rotterdam	Balance Beam
Bronze medal – third place	2010 Rotterdam	Team
Asian Games
Gold medal – first place	2010 Guangzhou	Team
Silver medal – second place	2010 Guangzhou	Balance Beam
National Games
Gold medal – first place	2009 Jinan	All-Around
Bronze medal – third place	2009 Jinan	Floor Exercise
Bronze medal – third place	2013 Dalian	All-Around

Deng Linlin (simplified Chinese: 邓琳琳; traditional Chinese: 鄧琳琳; pinyin: Dèng Línlín; pronounced [də̂ŋ lǐnlǐn]; born April 21, 1992) is a Chinese retired gymnast. She was a member of the Chinese team that won the team gold medal at the 2008 Olympic Games in Beijing, People's Republic of China, and is a three-time World Cup gold medalist. She is the 2009 World and 2012 Olympic champion on balance beam.

== Gymnastics career ==
Deng Linlin began her gymnastics career in Fuyang, Anhui (her family moved from Lixin to Fuyang in 1998), at the Anhui Fuyang Sports School and later attended the Anhui Provincial Sports School. She was selected to the Chinese national team in 2004.

=== 2008 ===
Deng made her international competitive debut in 2008, when she competed in several events on the World Cup circuit. At the World Cup meet in Doha in March, she won the gold medal on the balance beam and placed second on floor exercise behind her teammate Jiang Yuyuan. At the World Cup in Moscow, Deng won gold medals on both beam and floor.

At the 2008 Chinese National Championships, Deng finished in third place in the all-around, behind Jiang Yuyuan and Yang Yilin and also placed third on vault.

==== 2008 Olympics ====
Deng was a member of the Chinese team at the 2008 Olympic Games and participated in the preliminary and team final rounds of competition. In the preliminary team competition, Deng performed on all four apparatuses. She was ranked ninth overall after the preliminary round; however, Deng did not advance to the individual all-around final because no more than two gymnasts may represent each country in the all-around competition.

For the team final, Chinese coaches decided to replace Jiang with Deng on vault only 20 minutes before the competition. Deng performed solidly on three events in the team final, sticking a double twisting Yurchenko vault and receiving a 15.250. Deng also performed on balance beam and floor exercise, scoring 15.925 a 15.150, respectively. She was one of two Chinese gymnasts who performed on three apparatuses in the team final, the other being Cheng Fei.

Deng and Jiang, along with and national teammate Nai Ruoyu, were featured in a documentary about the lead-up to the Beijing Olympics titled 筑梦 2008 (pinyin: Zhù Mèng; released internationally as Dream Weavers: Beijing 2008) which premiered at the China Film Archive in July 2008.

=== 2009 ===
In 2009, after a seven-month-long knee recovery, Deng started to prepare for the 11th Chinese National Games held in September. During the competition, she surprisingly won the gold in the all-around final from the second group (7th in qualification) of the 24 finalists. After posting three solid routine on bars, beam and floor, she took a shot on vault by attempting the double twisting Yurchenko and succeeded with a clean landing to guarantee the win over Yang Yilin and Sui Lu from Guangdong and Shanghai, respectively. In the floor final, she got a bronze medal with a clean but relatively simple routine.

Later the same month, she became the world champion on balance beam in London. During the beam event final, she obtained the highest values in both D and E scores with 6.4 and 8.6, respectively. She became the fourth beam world champion of Chinese team, after Mo Huilan, Ling Jie and Fan Ye. In addition, she finished seventh on the floor exercise and eleventh in the all-around competition, after an uncharacteristic fall on her own strong event, balance beam.

=== 2010 ===
Deng struggled with her sciatic injury throughout 2010, which forced her to only compete on vault and beam. Even so, she continued her international success in 2010, garnering a team bronze medal at the 2010 World Championships with the Chinese team as well as an individual silver medal in the balance beam final. During the team final, the judges devalued her back layout somersault (an E level element) to a whip (a C level element), which resulted her 0.7 valued back flip + back flip + back layout series to only a 0.3, and the shown 15.10 score replaced with 14.70 after a call made from the Russian senior judge. In the beam final, she held the highest D value, a 6.6, of all the competitors. She was also chosen to compete in the 2010 Asian Games, where she won a gold with the team and an individual silver on the balance beam behind her teammate, Sui Lu.

=== 2011 ===
In 2011, Deng did not make the team for the 2011 World Championships in Tokyo due to injury. In November, she won an all-round title in the Chinese Winner Champions held in Hong Kong over her younger teammates. During this competition, she performed a 1.1 valued series of back flip + back flip + layout full (G level) + Korbut flip, which included a 0.4 connective bonus value; under AB/DE COPS, this is the highest value generated by one move on beam.

=== 2012 ===
In 2012, despite injuries, Deng regained the ability to vault a double twisting Yurchenko which was urgently needed for the Chinese team. With the winning of the all-around title at the Chinese National Championships, Deng made herself a member of the Chinese gymnastic team going to the 2012 Olympic Games. Due to Deng being declared the fourth member of the team, her long term teammate He Kexin was chosen as the final member because of her bars specialty.

==== 2012 Olympics ====
Deng was the captain of the Chinese team at the 2012 Summer Olympics. She helped qualify the team in third place, as well as to the all-around in fifth and the balance beam final in fourth. The Chinese team did not perform well in the team final, counting multiple major mistakes (including a fall by Deng off the balance beam) and finished in a disappointing fourth, completely off the podium. After finishing sixth in the individual all-around final, Deng rebounded and won the women's beam gold medal with a score of 15.600. She posted the highest marks for both the difficult score (6.6) and execution score (9.0) in the final, which was also the highest beam score in the entire Olympics. Her score was one tenth higher than that of her teammate Sui Lu, who was the reigning world champion at that time and had posted the top score (15.400) in the qualifying round. This is the second Olympic gymnastics gold medal of her career and the second Olympic balance beam gold medal for China.

== Competitive history ==
Year	Competition Description	Location	Apparatus	Rank-Final	Score-Final	Rank-Qualifying	Score-Qualifying
2012	Olympic Games	London	Team	4	174.430	3	176.637
2012	Olympic Games	London	Individual All-Around	6	58.399	6	57.998
2012	Olympic Games	London	Balance Beam	1	15.600	4	15.166
2010	World Championships	Rotterdam	Team	3	174.781	2	233.778
2010	World Championships	Rotterdam	Balance Beam	2	15.233	4	15.100
2009	World Championships	London	All-Around	11	55.250	4	56.350
2009	World Championships	London	Balance Beam	1	15.000	3	14.450
2009	World Championships	London	Floor	7	13.825	7	14.000
2008	Olympic Games	Beijing	Team	1	188.900	1	248.275

== Floor Music ==
- 2007 "Rise" by Safri Duo
- 2008 "Colette shows him the ropes" from "Ratatouille" soundtrack

== See also ==
- Age controversies in gymnastics
- Fédération Internationale de Gymnastique
- Gymnastics at the 2008 Summer Olympics – Women's artistic team all-around
