= Angel Wong (gymnast) =

Hong Kong artistic gymnast

Angel Wong Hiu Ying
- 黃曉盈
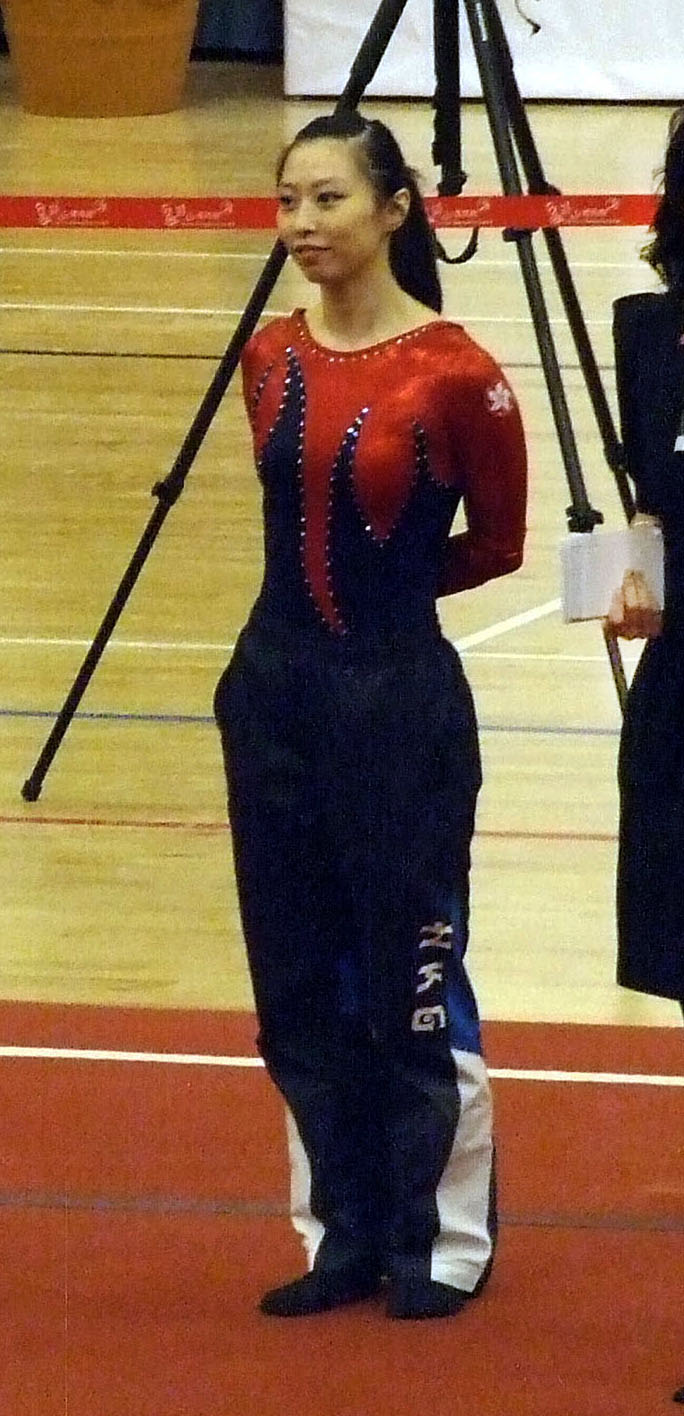
- Wong in 2011

Personal information
- Nickname: Ang
- Born: 11 May 1987 (age 39) British Hong Kong
- Height: 153 cm (5 ft 0 in)

Gymnastics career
- Discipline: Women's artistic gymnastics
- Country represented: Hong Kong; (1998-present)
- Club: GAHK
- Head coach: Poon King Hung
- Assistant coach: Zhong Jian
Medal record
Representing Hong Kong
Summer Universiade
Bronze medal – third place	2011 Shenzhen	Vault
Pacific Rim Championships
Silver medal – second place	2012 Everett	Vault
Asian Championships
Silver medal – second place	2008 Doha	Vault
- Education: Hong Kong Polytechnic University

Angel Wong Hiu Ying (Chinese: 黃曉盈; Jyutping: wong4 hiu2 jing4) is a Hong Kong artistic gymnast. On the vault, she is the 2008 Asian silver medalist and the 2011 Summer Universiade bronze medalist. She competed at the 2012 Summer Olympics, becoming Hong Kong's first Olympian in gymnastics. She has competed as a balance beam specialist since a major knee injury in 2015 and won a medal on that apparatus at a FIG World Cup event.

== Gymnastics career ==
=== 2007–2011: Early career ===
Wong competed on the vault and the balance beam at the 2007 World Championships and did not advance into the apparatus finals. She advanced to the vault final at the 2008 Pacific Rim Championships and finished sixth. At the 2008 Asian Championships, she won the silver medal in the vault final. She finished 58th in the all-around qualifications at the 2009 World Championships.

At the 2010 Pacific Rim Championships, Wong finished 13th in the all-around and sixth in the vault final. She won a bronze medal on the vault at the 2010 Doha World Cup, behind Jennifer Khwela and Tijana Tkalcek. Then at the Ghent World Cup, she won the vault gold medal. She represented Hong Kong at the 2010 Asian Games and qualified for the all-around final, finishing 11th. She also qualified for the vault final and finished sixth. At the 2011 Summer Universiade, she won a bronze medal in the vault final, behind Jo Hyun-joo and Anna Myzdrikova. She then finished 84th in the all-around qualifications at the 2011 World Championships.

=== 2012–2014: Olympian ===
At the 2012 Pacific Rim Championships, Wong won a silver medal on the vault. She finished 59th in the all-around at the 2012 Olympic Test Event and qualified for the 2012 Summer Olympics as one of the top 24 gymnasts not already qualified for the Olympics. Wong and Shek Wai Hung became Hong Kong's first Olympians in the sport of gymnastics. Her best result was on the vault, where she finished 13th in the qualifications.

Wong finished fourth in the vault final at the 2013 Cottbus World Cup. She only competed on the vault at the 2013 World Championships but did not advance to the apparatus final. She won a bronze medal on the vault at the 2014 Doha World Cup, behind Larisa Iordache and Teja Belak. She competed at the 2014 Asian Games and finished seventh in the vault final. At the 2014 Toyota International, she won the silver medal in the vault final, behind Mai Murakami.

=== 2015–present: Injuries and comebacks ===
At the 2015 Sao Paolo World Cup, Wong finished eighth in the vault final and sixth in the balance beam final. She was scheduled to compete at the 2015 Summer Universiade, but the national team coach withdrew Hong Kong due to the MERS outbreak. While training on the uneven bars for the 2015 Asian Championships, she severely injured her knee, tearing all four of the major ligaments. She had three surgeries to repair the ligaments and began training and competing only on the balance beam. She returned to competition at the 2017 Hong Kong Open Championships and competed a balance beam routine with only five skills but still won the gold medal. She tore her meniscus while training in 2018 and had another surgery.

Wong competed at the 2021 World Championships, her first World Championships since 2014. She only competed on the balance beam and finished 53rd. She advanced to the balance beam final at the 2022 Doha World Cup, her first time advancing to a FIG World Cup final since the last competition before her knee injuries in 2015. She then won the bronze medal in the final, her first FIG World Cup medal since 2014. She qualified for the 2022 World Championships with her results on the FIG World Cup series. She represented Hong Kong at the 2022 Asian Games but fell off the balance beam twice in the qualification round. As of 2026, she is still competing on the balance beam at international competitions.

=== Eponymous skill ===
Wong has a balance beam mount named after her in the Code of Points.

Apparatus	Name	Description	Difficulty (Note: Valid for the 2025–2028 Code of Points)	Added to the Code of Points
Balance beam	Wong	Salto forward tucked with 1/2 turn mount	F (0.6)	2012 Olympic Games

== Personal life ==
Wong was born in Hong Kong but grew up in Australia, which is where she started gymnastics. Her older sister also competed in gymnastics until a training accident in 2008 left her paraplegic. She graduated from Hong Kong Polytechnic University with a degree in fashion design. She worked as a commentator during the 2016 and 2020 Summer Olympics.
