= Lim Heem Wei =

Singaporean artistic gymnast

- Born: 12 April 1989 (age 37) Singapore
- Height: 151 cm (4 ft 11 in)

Gymnastics career
- Discipline: Women's artistic gymnastics
- Country represented: Singapore
- Gym: High Performance Training Centre
- Head coaches: Yuan Kexia & Zhao Qun
Medal record
Representing Singapore
Commonwealth Games
| Silver medal – second place | 2010 Delhi | Balance Beam |
Asian Championships
| Bronze medal – third place | 2008 Doha | Team |
Southeast Asian Games
| Gold medal – first place | 2005 Manila | Team |
| Gold medal – first place | 2007 Thailand | Team |
| Gold medal – first place | 2011 Palembang | Team |
| Silver medal – second place | 2003 Hanoi | Team |
| Silver medal – second place | 2003 Hanoi | Balance beam |
| Silver medal – second place | 2011 Palembang | Floor exercise |
| Bronze medal – third place | 2011 Palembang | All-around |

Lim Heem Wei (born 12 April 1989) is a Singapore former artistic gymnast. She is the 2010 Commonwealth Games balance beam silver medalist and a 2008 Asian Championships team bronze medalist. She competed at the 2012 Summer Olympics, becoming Singapore's first Olympian in gymnastics.

== Gymnastics career ==
Lim was the final member of the team selected to compete at the 2001 SEA Games, when she was 12 years old. She won a silver medal with the team at the 2003 SEA Games and also won a silver medal on the balance beam. At the 2005 SEA Games, she helped Singapore win the team title for the first time. She advanced into the all-around final at the 2006 Asian Games, finishing ninth. She also advanced into the vault and floor exercise finals, finishing seventh and eighth, respectively. She helped Singapore defend their team title at the 2007 SEA Games. At the 2007 World Championships, she finished 117th in the all-around qualifications. She was a member of the team that won the bronze medal at the 2008 Asian Championships.

Lim missed most of the 2009 season due to an ankle injury that required surgery. She returned for the 2010 season and placed 11th in the all-around at the Pacific Rim Championships. At the 2010 Commonwealth Games, she won the silver medal in the balance beam final, behind Lauren Mitchell. She then competed at the 2010 Asian Games and placed 12th in the all-around final. She helped Singapore win another team title at the 2011 SEA Games, and she won the all-around bronze medal, behind Phan Thị Hà Thanh and Đỗ Thị Ngân Thương. She also won a silver medal in the balance beam final.

Lim finished 103rd in the all-around qualifications at the 2011 World Championships and advanced into the 2012 Olympic Test Event. There, she finished 63rd in the all-around. As one of the top 24 gymnasts not already qualified for the Olympics, she earned a berth to the 2012 Summer Olympics. This marked the first time a gymnast from Singapore qualified for the Olympic Games. In London, she finished 45th in the all-around qualifications with a personal best score on the uneven bars.

Lim finished 17th in the all-around final at the 2013 Summer Universiade. At the 2013 World Championships, she finished 59th in the all-around qualifications. She represented Singapore at the 2014 Commonwealth Games and was the flagbearer in the opening ceremonies. She advanced into the all-around final and finished 19th. She also advanced into the all-around final at the 2014 Asian Games and finished 14th.

== Post-gymnastics career ==
Lim retired from the sport in December 2014. She was a judge for the gymnastics competition at the 2017 SEA Games in Kuala Lumpur. She was the Chef de Mission for Singapore at the 2022 Commonwealth Games. As of 2026, she is a coach for Singapore's national gymnastics team and is a member of the Commonwealth Games Athletes Commission.
