= Kōko Tsurumi =

Japanese artistic gymnast

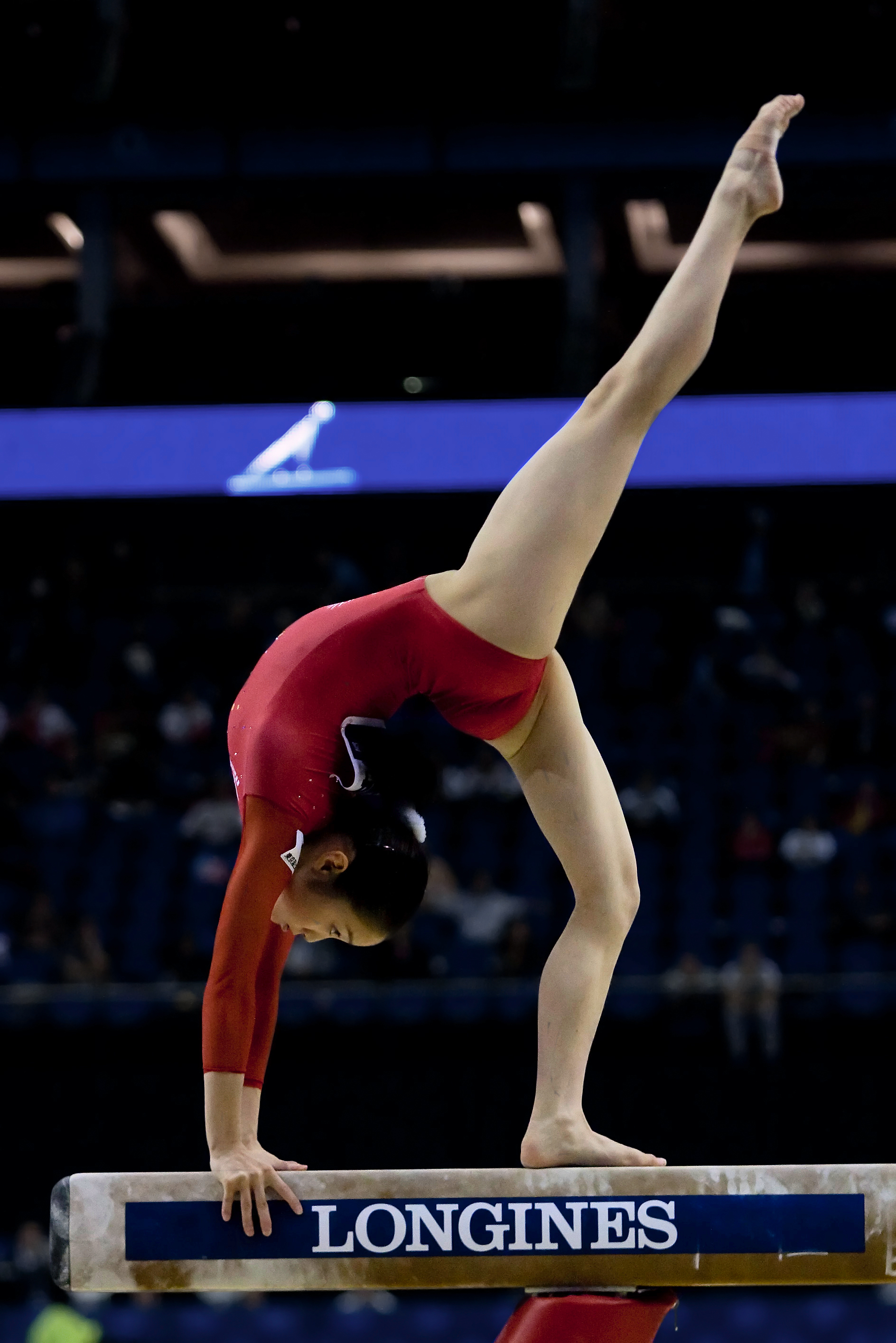
- Tsurumi at the 2009 World Championships

Personal information
- Full name: Kōko Tsurumi
- Alternative name: 鶴見 虹子
- Born: September 28, 1992 (age 34) Tokyo, Japan

Gymnastics career
- Discipline: Women's artistic gymnastics
- Country represented: Japan; (2006–2012)
- Club: Asahi Seimei Gymnastic Club
- Head coach: Sergei Butsula
- Former coach: Chieko Tsukahara
- Choreographer: Alina Kozich
- Retired: 2015
Medal record
Representing Japan
World Championships
| Silver medal – second place | 2009 London | Uneven Bars |
| Bronze medal – third place | 2009 London | All-Around |
World Cup Final
| Bronze medal – third place | 2008 Madrid | Uneven Bars |
Asian Games
| Silver medal – second place | 2010 Guangzhou | Team |
| Bronze medal – third place | 2010 Guangzhou | Uneven Bars |
Asian Championships
| Gold medal – first place | 2008 Doha | Team |
| Gold medal – first place | 2008 Doha | All-Around |
| Gold medal – first place | 2008 Doha | Uneven Bars |
| Gold medal – first place | 2008 Doha | Floor Exercise |

Kōko Tsurumi (鶴見虹子, Tsurumi Kōko; born September 28, 1992) is a retired Japanese artistic gymnast. She is the 2009 World all-around bronze medalist, uneven bars silver medalist, and a two-time Olympian (2008, 2012).

== Gymnastics career ==
Tsurumi was a member of the 2008 Japanese Olympic Team. The women's gymnastics team placed 5th in team competition. Individually, Tsurumi placed 17th in the all-around final and 8th in the balance beam event final.

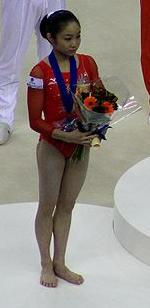
Tsurumi at the 2009 World Championships

Tsurumi competed at the 2009 American Cup and placed 7th all-around.

At the 2009 World Championships in London, Koko Tsurumi competed a historic performance to win the individual all-around bronze medal. During event finals, Tsurumi won the silver medal on uneven bars and placed 6th on balance beam. Tsurumi is the first Japanese woman gymnast to win a World Championships medal in 43 years.

Koko competed at the 2010 Japan Cup and placed second all-around behind Ksenia Afanasyeva. At that competition, Tsurumi scored a 15.400 on uneven bars. She debuted a new bars routine with an ono turn to half turn connected to a Tkachev and an ono turn connected to a Jaegar. At the 2010 World Artistic Gymnastics Championships, Tsurumi experienced problems with consistency and failed to make any event finals and placed 21st in the All Around, behind countrywoman Rie Tanaka.

At the 2011 Japan Cup, Koko placed 2nd place with the Japanese team in the team competition and won the gold medal in the all around competition. She placed 0.100 higher than 2nd-place finisher, Chinese gymnast Sui Lu. Later that year she placed seventh on Uneven Bars at the World Championships and seventh with the team.

In 2012, Koko was part of Japan's Olympic team in London, where she placed seventh in the bars final and eighth with the team.

She made her elite comeback at the 2015 WOGA Classic in Plano, Texas, scoring 15.000 on bars and 13.850 on beam.

At the NHK Cup, Tsurumi suffered an achilles tendon injury and was out for the remainder of the 2015 season. She retired in 2015.

== Away from gymnastics ==
Tsurumi joined SASUKE 39 at 28 December 2021. She was given number 81 and failed Stage 1 at Fish Bone .

== Competitive history ==
=== Senior ===
| Year | Event | Team | AA | VT | UB | BB | FX |
|---|---|---|---|---|---|---|---|
2007
| 2007 | World Championships | | 15 | | | | |
2008
| 2008 | Asian Championships | 1st place, gold medalist(s) | 1st place, gold medalist(s) | | 1st place, gold medalist(s) | 4 | 1st place, gold medalist(s) |
| 2008 | Olympic Games | 5 | 17 | | | 8 | |
| 2008 | World Cup Final | | | | 3rd place, bronze medalist(s) | | 7 |
| 2009 | American Cup | | 7 | | | | |
| 2009 | World Championships | | 3rd place, bronze medalist(s) | | 2nd place, silver medalist(s) | 6 | |
| 2010 | Japan Cup | | 2nd place, silver medalist(s) | | | | |
| 2010 | National Championships | | 1st place, gold medalist(s) | | | | |
| 2010 | World Championships | 5 | 21 | | | | |
| 2010 | Asian Games | 2nd place, silver medalist(s) | 7 | | 3rd place, bronze medalist(s) | | |
| 2011 | Japan Cup | 2nd place, silver medalist(s) | 1st place, gold medalist(s) | | | | |
| 2011 | NHK Cup | | 1st place, gold medalist(s) | | | | |
| 2011 | World Championships | 7 | 15 | | 7 | | |
| 2012 | National Championships | | 7 | | | | |
| 2012 | Olympic Games | 8 | | | 7 | | |
| 2014 | National Championships | 1st place, gold medalist(s) | | | | | |
| 2015 | WOGA Classic | | | | 2nd place, silver medalist(s) | | |
| 2015 | National Championships | | 5 | | | | |

Kōko Tsurumi

Japanese name
- Kanji: 鶴見 虹子
- Hiragana: つるみ こうこ
Transcriptions
- Romanization: TSURUMI Kōko
