= Yuko Shintake =

Japanese artistic gymnast

- Born: 20 April 1991 (age 35) Osaka, Japan
- Height: 1.54 m (5 ft 1 in)

Gymnastics career
- Country represented: Japan
- Club: Hagoromo University of International Studies
- Head coach: Toshiko Ioka
Medal record
Women's gymnastics
Representing Japan
Asian Games
Silver medal – second place	2010 Guangzhou	Team
East Asian Games
Silver medal – second place	2013 Tianjin	Team
Silver medal – second place	2013 Tianjin	Balance Beam

Yuko Shintake (新竹 優子, Shintake Yūko; born 20 April 1991) is a Japanese former artistic gymnast. She competed for the national team at the 2008 and 2012 Summer Olympics, and she won a team silver medal at the 2010 Asian Games.

== Gymnastics career ==
Shintake started gymnastics at the age of three and made the national team in 2007. She was selected to represent Japan at the 2008 Summer Olympics and competed on the vault, balance beam, and floor exercise in the team final, where Japan finished fifth. After the Olympics, she competed at the 2008 Asian Championships and won a gold medal with the team. Individually, she tied with North Korea's Kang Yong-mi for the bronze medal on the floor exercise.

Shintake competed at a 2009 dual meet against the United States and had the highest score of the meet on the uneven bars. She only competed on the balance beam at the 2009 World Championships and did not advance into the apparatus final. She won the gold medal on the balance beam at the 2009 Toyota International.

At the 2010 World Championships, Shintake competed on the uneven bars and the balance beam in the team final to help Japan finish fifth. She then represented Japan at the 2010 Asian Games and won a silver medal in the team competition. Individually, she advanced to the balance beam final and finished fifth.

Shintake finished third in the all-around at the 2011 All-Japan Championships. At the 2011 World Championships, she competed with the Japanese team that finished fifth in the team final and earned a berth to the 2012 Summer Olympics.

Shintake placed sixth in the all-around at the 2012 All-Japan Championships. She then finished fifth at the NHK Trophy and was selected to represent Japan at the 2012 Summer Olympics. There, she fell off the balance beam in the team final, where Japan finished eighth. At the 2013 East Asian Games, she helped Japan win the silver medal, behind China. She then won a silver medal in the balance beam final, behind Tan Sixin. This was the final competition of her career. She retired from gymnastics to attend graduate school at the University of Tsukuba. As of 2017, she is an assistant professor at Juntendo University, where she also coaches the gymnastics team.
