= Asal Saparbaeva =

Uzbekistani artistic gymnast

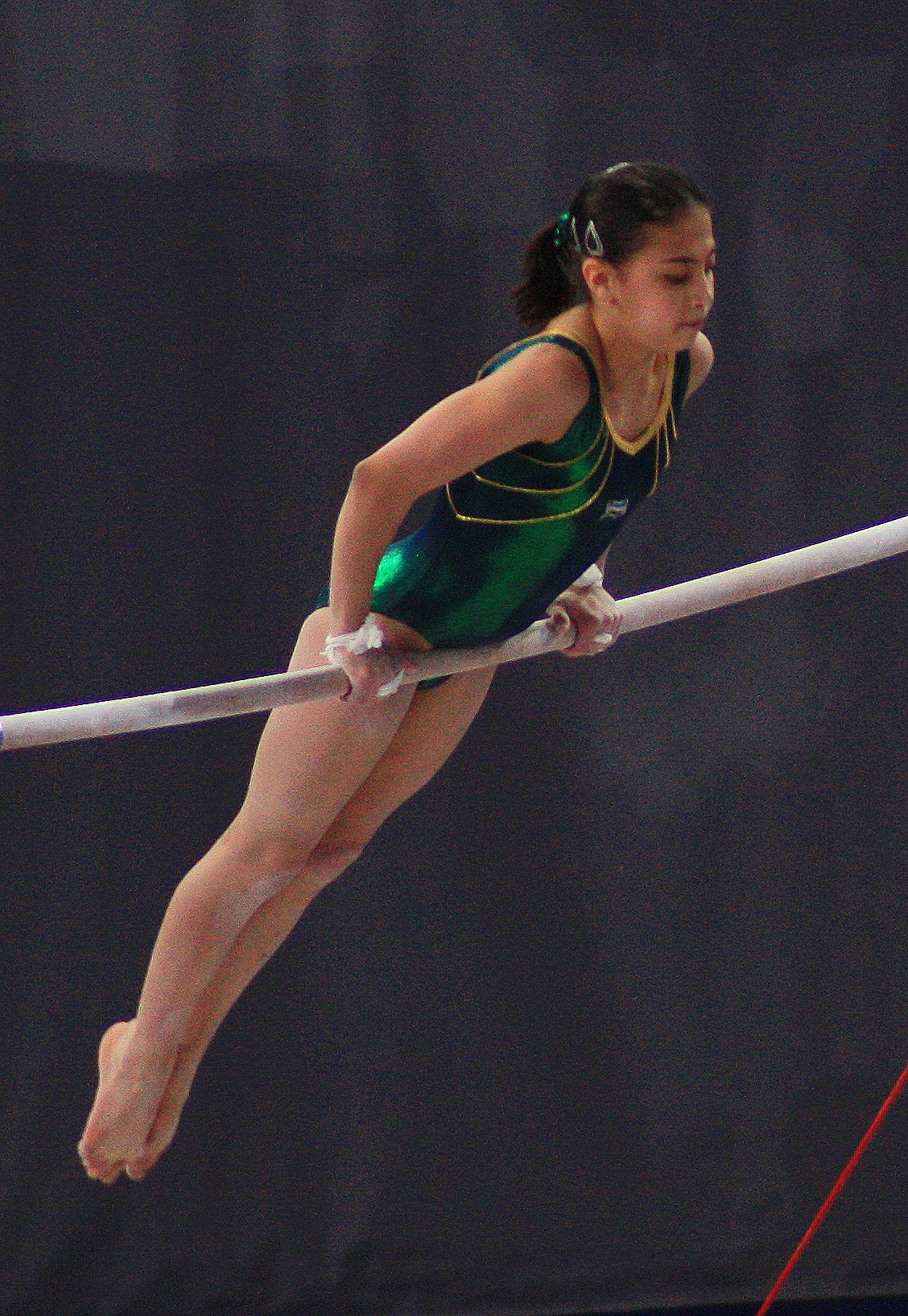

Personal information
- Full name: Saparbaeva Asal Saparbaevna
- Nickname: Littos
- Born: February 7, 1994 (age 32) Samarkand
- Height: 153 cm (5 ft 0 in)
- Spouse: Nikolenko Yaroslav

Gymnastics career
- Discipline: Women's artistic gymnastics
- Country represented: Uzbekistan
- Head coach: Oksana Chusovitina
- Retired: 2015
Medal record
Asian Games
Bronze medal – third place	2010 Guangzhou	Team
Representing Uzbekistan
South Central Asian Championships
Gold medal – first place	2011 Dhaka	Floor
Gold medal – first place	2011 Dhaka	Balance Beam
FIG World Cup
Event / 1st / 2nd / 3rd; World Challenge Cup / 0 / 0 / 1

Asal Saparbaeva (uzb: Asal Saparboeva, cycrillic: Асал Сапарбаева born February 7, 1994) is an Uzbek former artistic gymnast and member of the national Olympic team of Uzbekistan. Bronze medalist of Asian Games in 2014 and at FIG World Cup in 2014 in Portugal. She has competed at the Asian Games 2010 2014, South Central Asian Gymnastics Championships Dhaka 2011 and bronze medalist at the Artistic Gymnastics World Challenge cup in 2014

== Gymnastics career ==
From the age of 5 to 21 she was professionally engaged in gymnastic. Since 2007 she has been a member of the national team of Uzbekistan. From that moment on, she began to travel abroad to major international competitions and represent her country. multiple champion of Uzbekistan, bronze medalist of the Asian Games in China, Guangzhou in 2010, Champion of Central and South Asia Dhaka in 2011 and bronze medalist of the World Cup in Portugal in 2014.

2010 Asian Games Guangzhou, China.

Medal	Name	Sport	Event	Date
Bronze	Asal Saparbaeva	Artistic Gymnastics	Women's artistic	17 November

2011 4th Central South Asian Artistic Gymnastics Championships

Medal	Name	Sport	Event	Date
(gold) Gold	Asal Saparbaeva	Artistic Gymnastics	Women's artistic	30 October

2014 FIG Artistic Gymnastics World Cup

Medal	Name	Sport	Event	Date
Bronze	Asal Saparbaeva	Artistic Gymnastics	Women's artistic	1 June

== Personal life ==
Asal Saparbaeva is married.

=== Education ===
- 2005–2013 Studied at the Republican College of Olympic Reserve
- 2013–2017 Uzbek State Institute of Physical Culture

Degree

- Title: Master of Sports in International Class in artistic gymnastics
