= Huang Qiushuang =

Chinese gymnast (born 1992)

Personal information
- Full name: 黄秋爽 (Huang Qiushuang)
- Born: May 28, 1992 (age 34) Xiangfan, Hubei
- Height: 154 cm (5 ft 1 in)

Gymnastics career
- Discipline: Women's artistic gymnastics
- Country represented: China (2008–12 (CHN))
- Head coach: Lu Shanzhen
- Music: Jack Sparrow, Pirates of the Caribbean
- Eponymous skills: stalder forward in L-grip with full turn to handstand, initiated on one arm before handstand (uneven bars)
- Retired: 2013
Medal record
Representing China
World Championships
Bronze medal – third place	2010 Rotterdam	Team
Bronze medal – third place	2011 Tokyo	Team
Bronze medal – third place	2011 Tokyo	Uneven Bars
Asian Games
Gold medal – first place	2010 Guangzhou	Team
Gold medal – first place	2010 Guangzhou	Vault
Silver medal – second place	2010 Guangzhou	All-Around
Silver medal – second place	2010 Guangzhou	Uneven Bars
Pacific Rim Championships
Gold medal – first place	2010 Melbourne	Uneven Bars
Silver medal – second place	2008 San Jose	Balance beam
Silver medal – second place	2010 Melbourne	Team
Bronze medal – third place	2008 San Jose	Team
National Games
Silver medal – second place	2009 Jinan	Team

Huang Qiushuang (Chinese: 黄秋爽; pinyin: Huáng Qiūshuǎng), born on 28 May 1992, is a Chinese gymnast. She is an individual all-arounder known for her clean form and artistry. She was a part of the Chinese team for the London 2012 Olympic Games.

== Gymnastics career ==
Huang started gymnastics training at the age of 5. In junior competition during 2005 and 2006, Huang won championship titles at the Chinese national level in vault, uneven bars, balance beam, all-around, and with her team. Huang represented the province of Guangdong in a national-level competition. At the 2008 national championships, she obtained gold with the team.

At the international level, Huang represented China at the 2009 Japan Cup in July 2009. She won gold in the individual all-around ahead of Russian soon-to-be stars Aliya Mustafina and Tatiana Nabieva, and gold in the team event with teammates He Kexin, Xiao Sha and Zhang Jing.

At the 11th Chinese national games in September 2009, Huang participated as part of the Guangdong team, despite a lower leg injury. She received a silver in the team event, where Guangdong was narrowly defeated by 0.125 points by the Shanghai team led by Sui Lu. In the individual events, Huang qualified first in the all-around, second on the floor and third on the uneven bars. However, she did not earn any medals on the floor (6th) and in the all-around (5th) due to errors, or on the uneven bars, having forfeited her uneven bars finals position to Guangdong teammate Wu Liufang.

Huang did not attend the 2009 World Championships in London because of her injury.

She participated in the 2010 Doha World Cup, where she won gold on uneven bars and silver on floor.

At the 2010 World Championships, Huang won a bronze medal with the team and came fourth in the all-around. She qualified in second for the uneven bars final, but came sixth due to a fall.

At the 2010 Asian Games in Guangzhou, Huang won gold medals with the team and on vault, and silver medals in the all-around and on uneven bars.

At the 2011 World Championships, Huang won a bronze medal with the team and came fifth in the all-around. She also won her first individual World Championships medal on uneven bars by coming third in the event final.

At the 2012 Olympic Games, Huang was seventh on uneven bars in qualification, but did not qualify due to the two-per-country rule. She qualified in 10th place in the AA final. In the finals, she helped the Chinese team to a fourth-place finish. During the floor competition in the team final she fell on her 2.5 punch front scoring a 12.500 and placed seventh in the all-around final. She retired shortly after the London Olympics.

== Competitive history ==
Year	Competition Description	Location	Apparatus	Rank-Final	Score-Final	Rank-Qualifying	Score-Qualifying
2012	Olympic Games	London	Team	4	174.430	3	176.637
2012	Olympic Games	London	All-Around	7	58.115	10	57.707
2012	Olympic Games	London	Uneven Bars			7	15.266
2012	Olympic Games	London	Balance Beam			28	13.866
2012	Olympic Games	London	Floor			38	13.575
2011	World Championships	Tokyo	Team	3	172.820	3	230.370
2011	World Championships	Tokyo	All-Around	5	57.432	7	56.932
2011	World Championships	Tokyo	Uneven Bars	3	14.833	4	14.900
2011	World Championships	Tokyo	Balance Beam			8	14.666
2011	World Championships	Tokyo	Floor			87	12.766
2010	Asian Games	Guangzhou	Team	1	234.150	-	-
2010	Asian Games	Guangzhou	All-Around	2	58.050	1	59.000
2010	Asian Games	Guangzhou	Vault	1	14.787	1	14.900
2010	Asian Games	Guangzhou	Uneven Bars	2	15.825	2	15.850
2010	Asian Games	Guangzhou	Floor	5	12.975	2	13.900
2010	World Championships	Rotterdam	Team	3	174.781	2	233.778
2010	World Championships	Rotterdam	All-Around	4	58.366	5	58.065
2010	World Championships	Rotterdam	Uneven Bars	6	14.400	2	15.666
2010	World Cup	Doha	Uneven Bars	1	15.025	1	15.250
2010	World Cup	Doha	Balance Beam	7	12.600	4	13.325
2010	World Cup	Doha	Floor	2	13.850	1	13.575
