= Yang Yilin =

Chinese artistic gymnast

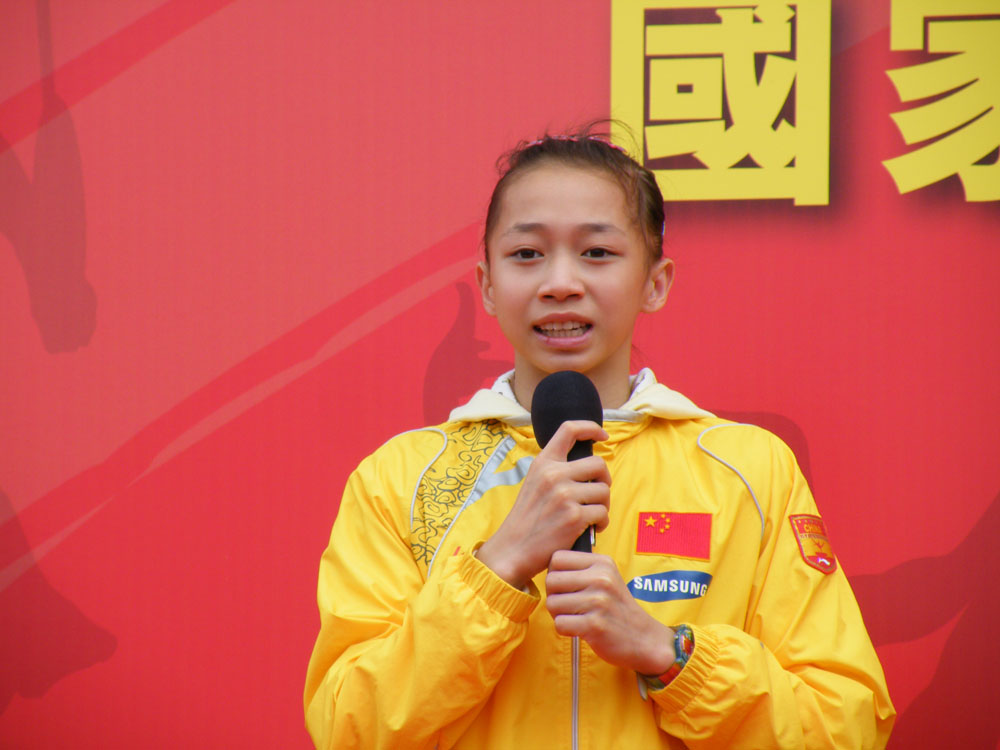
- Yang in 2008

Personal information
- Born: 26 August 1992 (age 34) Huadu, Guangzhou, Guangdong
- Height: 161 cm (5 ft 3 in)

Gymnastics career
- Discipline: Women's artistic gymnastics
- Country represented: China; (2007–2010)
- Head coach: Lu Shanzhen
- Assistant coach: Liu Qunlin
Medal record
Representing China
Olympic Games
Gold medal – first place	2008 Beijing	Team
Bronze medal – third place	2008 Beijing	All-around
Bronze medal – third place	2008 Beijing	Uneven bars
World Championships
Silver medal – second place	2007 Stuttgart	Team
Bronze medal – third place	2007 Stuttgart	Uneven bars
Bronze medal – third place	2010 Rotterdam	Team
Asian Games
Gold medal – first place	2010 Guangzhou	Team
National Games
Silver medal – second place	2009 Jinan	Team
Silver medal – second place	2009 Jinan	All-around
Silver medal – second place	2009 Jinan	Uneven bars

Yang Yilin
- Traditional Chinese: 楊伊琳
- Simplified Chinese: 杨伊琳
Transcriptions
Standard Mandarin
- Hanyu Pinyin: Yáng Yīlín
Yue: Cantonese
- Jyutping: Yeung4 Yi1 Lam4

Yang Yilin (born 26 August 1992) is a Chinese retired artistic gymnast. At the 2008 Summer Olympics, she won a gold medal with the Chinese team and individual bronze medals in the all-around and on the uneven bars. She is also the 2007 World team silver medalist and uneven bars bronze medalist, and the 2010 Asian Games team champion.

== Gymnastic career ==
Yang's first major international competition was the 2007 World Championships, where she helped China win the team silver medal behind the United States. Individually, she placed sixth in the all-around final, and she won a bronze medal in the uneven bars final behind Ksenia Semyonova and Nastia Liukin. At the 2008 Tianjin World Cup, she won a gold medal on the uneven bars, and she won a silver medal on the floor exercise behind Cheng Fei.

Yang was selected to represent China at the 2008 Summer Olympics. During the team final, she competed on the vault and the uneven bars to help China win its first-ever Olympic team gold medal in women's artistic gymnastics. She then competed in the all-around final where she won the bronze medal behind Americans Nastia Liukin and Shawn Johnson. She won another bronze medal in the uneven bars final, behind He Kexin and Liukin. Yang's eligibility for the games was questioned based on age discrepancies. This prompted an investigation by the International Gymnastics Federation (FIG), who found no fault with the officially-reported birthdates of Yang and her teammates.

After the Olympic Games, Yang competed at the 2008 Stuttgart World Cup and won bronze medals on the balance beam and floor exercise, both behind Cheng Fei and Lauren Mitchell. She competed at the 2009 World Championships and finished sixth in the all-around final after falling on her uneven bars dismount. She also advanced to the balance beam final, but she fell and finished eighth.

At the 2010 Ghent World Cup, Yang won the balance beam silver medal behind Romania's Ana Porgras, and she placed fourth on the uneven bars. She then helped the Chinese team win the bronze medal at the 2010 World Championships. Prior to competing at the 2010 Asian Games, she was part of the torch relay in her hometown, Guangzhou. She went on to help China win the gold medal in the team event.

Yang officially ended her gymnastics career in 2013 due to a back injury.

== Personal life ==
As of 2024, Yang is a student at the University of Macau studying for a Doctor of Public Administration. She has two children.

== Competitive history ==
Competitive history of Yang Yilin
Year	Event	Team	AA	VT	UB	BB	FX
2007
2007	World Championships	2nd place, silver medalist(s)	6		3rd place, bronze medalist(s)		
2008	Tianjin World Cup				1st place, gold medalist(s)		2nd place, silver medalist(s)
2008	Olympic Games	1st place, gold medalist(s)	3rd place, bronze medalist(s)		3rd place, bronze medalist(s)		
2008	Stuttgart World Cup					3rd place, bronze medalist(s)	3rd place, bronze medalist(s)
2009
2009	World Championships		6			8	
2010	Ghent World Cup				4	2nd place, silver medalist(s)	
2010	World Championships	3rd place, bronze medalist(s)					
2010	Asian Games	1st place, gold medalist(s)					
