= Sui Lu =

Chinese gymnast

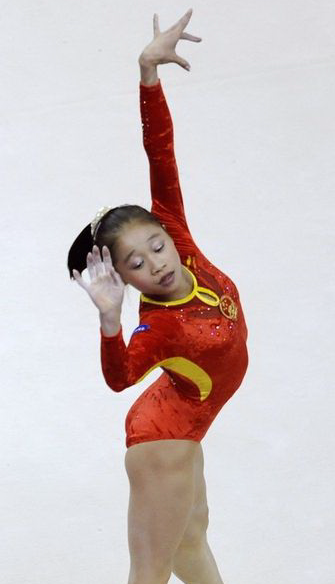
- Lu in 2009

Personal information
- Full name: 眭禄 (Sui Lu)
- Born: 1 April 1992 (age 34) Zhuzhou, Hunan
- Height: 1.51 m (4 ft 11 in)

Gymnastics career
- Discipline: Women's artistic gymnastics
- Country represented: China; (2007–2013)
- Head coach: 陸善真 (Lu Shanzhen)
- Assistant coach: 王群策 (Wang Qunce)、徐惊雷 (Xu Jinglei)
- Retired: 2013
Medal record
Representing China
Olympic Games
Silver medal – second place	2012 London	Balance Beam
World Championships
Gold medal – first place	2011 Tokyo	Balance Beam
Silver medal – second place	2011 Tokyo	Floor Exercise
Bronze medal – third place	2009 London	Floor Exercise
Bronze medal – third place	2010 Rotterdam	Team
Bronze medal – third place	2011 Tokyo	Team
Asian Games
Gold medal – first place	2010 Guangzhou	Team
Gold medal – first place	2010 Guangzhou	All-Around
Gold medal – first place	2010 Guangzhou	Balance Beam
Gold medal – first place	2010 Guangzhou	Floor Exercise
National Games
Gold medal – first place	2009 Jinan	Team
Gold medal – first place	2009 Jinan	Floor Exercise
Gold medal – first place	2013 Liaoning	Team
Silver medal – second place	2013 Liaoning	Balance Beam
Silver medal – second place	2013 Liaoning	Floor Exercise
Bronze medal – third place	2009 Jinan	All-Around
Bronze medal – third place	2009 Jinan	Balance Beam

Sui Lu (Chinese: 眭禄; pinyin: Suī Lù, born 1 April 1992) is a retired Chinese gymnast. She started competing at the senior international level in 2008, and won a silver medal at the 2012 Olympics. Her strongest events were the balance beam, where she was the 2011 world champion and 2012 Olympic silver medalist, and the floor exercise, where she won two world championships medals.

== Gymnastics career ==
=== Early career ===
Sui Lu started training gymnastics at the age of 3, and was selected into the Shanghai team in 2000. In Chinese national level competition, Sui has made many achievements for the Shanghai team.

Being a beam and floor specialist, Sui was one of the hopefuls to be selected to the Beijing Olympic team, which would later win China's first women's team gold medal. However, her inconsistent performances at the World Cup series in 2008 prevented her from making the final squad.

=== 2009 ===
At the 11th Chinese national games in 2009, Sui led the Shanghai team as their key gymnast. She competed and successfully executed on all 4 apparatus in the team final. Her final spectacular floor performance allowed the trailing Shanghai team to upset the Guangdong team by 0.125 points and take the gold. She also achieved bronze in the all-around, gold on floor and bronze on balance beam, receiving a total of four medals at the 11th national games.

Since 2009, Sui has established herself as a strong Chinese beam and floor specialist and won many national and international titles.

Sui debuted at the senior international level at the 2009 World Championships in London. Here she received a bronze on floor exercise. She also placed 8th on balance beam after a fall in qualifications, but could not participate in the final as teammates Deng Linlin and Yang Yilin qualified ahead of her, and only 2 competitors per nation are allowed in finals.

In 2009, Sui Lu also won medals in a number of World Cups, including gold for floor at the Cottbus World Cup, gold for beam and floor at the Osijek World Cup, and gold for floor at the Stuttgart World Cup.

=== 2010 ===
At the 2010 World Championships, Sui won a bronze medal with team China and finished 5th in the floor exercise final. She failed to make the beam final after a fall in the preliminary stage.

At the 2010 Asian Games in Guangzhou, Sui won a total of 4 gold medals (in team, all-around, beam and floor), more than any other gymnast and athlete at these games.

=== 2011 ===
At the 2011 World Championships, Sui contributed in the team final on beam and floor, helping the team earn a bronze medal. Sui won the gold on balance beam after a performance that left her with a margin of more than 0.5 points over the silver medalist, teammate Yao Jinnan. Sui scored 15.866 during the final, which became the highest scoring beam routine in the entire London Olympic period (2009–2012). She immediately followed it with a strong performance in the floor final, winning the silver medal with a score of 15.066, behind Russian gymnast Ksenia Afanasyeva.

=== 2012 ===
Sui revealed in a subsequent interview that she considered retiring after being left off the Olympics Team in 2008, but that these 4 years of hard work had been worth it, and that she was glad she persisted after encouragement from her coaches.

Sui was named to the Chinese women's artistic gymnastics team for the 2012 Olympic Games, where she helped her team to a fourth-place finish in the team final, contributing the highest scores for her team on beam (15.366) and floor (14.6). She additionally qualified in first place to the balance beam event final (15.4), where she finished with the silver medal (15.5) behind gold medalist and teammate Deng Linlin.

== Retirement ==
Sui Lu retired from gymnastics after the 2013 National Games. As of January 2022, she is working as a physical education teacher in Shanghai.

== Competitive history ==
Year	Competition Description	Location	Apparatus	Rank-Final	Score-Final	Rank-Qualifying	Score-Qualifying
2012	Olympic Games	London	Team	4	174.43	3	176.637
2012	Olympic Games	London	Balance Beam	2	15.500	1	15.400
2012	National Championships	Shanghai	Team	1	221.400		
2012	National Championships	Shanghai	Uneven Bars			7	13.550
2012	National Championships	Shanghai	Balance Beam	3	13.825	1	15.350
2012	National Championships	Shanghai	Floor	1	15.066	1	13.950
2011	World Championships	Tokyo	Team	3	172.820	3	230.370
2011	World Championships	Tokyo	All-around			147	43.533
2011	World Championships	Tokyo	Balance Beam	1	15.866	2	15.400
2011	World Championships	Tokyo	Floor	2	15.066	2	14.600
2010	Asian Games	Guangzhou	Team	1	234.150	-	-
2010	Asian Games	Guangzhou	All-around	1	58.400	2	57.550
2010	Asian Games	Guangzhou	Balance Beam	1	15.425	1	15.300
2010	Asian Games	Guangzhou	Floor	1	14.700	1	14.500
2010	World Championships	Rotterdam	Team	3	174.781	2	233.778
2010	World Championships	Rotterdam	Floor	5	14.666	4	14.633
2009	World Championships	London	Floor	3	14.300	2	14.275
2009	World Cup	Cottbus	Floor	1	14.200	1	14.150
2009	World Cup	Osijek	Balance Beam	1	13.750	1	13.775
2009	World Cup	Osijek	Floor	1	13.825	1	13.875
2009	World Cup	Stuttgart	Floor	1	14.125	1	14.075
