= Đỗ Thị Ngân Thương =

Vietnamese artistic gymnast (born 1989)

Đỗ Thị Ngân Thuơng
- Born: 10 March 1989 (age 37) Hanoi, Vietnam
- Height: 1.47 m (4 ft 10 in)

Gymnastics career
- Discipline: Women's artistic gymnastics
- Country represented: Vietnam
- Head coach: Do Thuy Giang
- Assistant coach: You Yanan
Medal record
Artistic Gymnastics
Southeast Asian Games
Gold medal – first place	2003 Hanoi	Team
Gold medal – first place	2003 Hanoi	Uneven bars
Gold medal – first place	2005 Manila	Balance beam
Gold medal – first place	2005 Manila	All-around
Gold medal – first place	2007 Nakhon Ratchasima	Balance beam
Gold medal – first place	2011 Palembang	Balance beam
Gold medal – first place	2011 Palembang	Uneven bars
Silver medal – second place	2003 Hanoi	Vault
Silver medal – second place	2005 Manila	Team
Silver medal – second place	2007 Nakhon Ratchasima	Team
Silver medal – second place	2011 Palembang	All-around
Bronze medal – third place	2003 Hanoi	All-around
Bronze medal – third place	2007 Nakhon Ratchasima	All-around
Bronze medal – third place	2007 Nakhon Ratchasima	Floor exercise

Đỗ Thị Ngân Thương (born 10 March 1989) is a Vietnamese former artistic gymnast. She represented Vietnam at the 2008 and 2012 Summer Olympics, with her 2008 results nullified due to a doping violation. Ngân Thương is the 2005 Southeast Asian Games and 2007 Southeast Asian Games champion on the balance beam and 2007 bronze medalist on the floor exercise.

== Gymnastics career ==
Ngân Thương began gymnastics when she was six years old because her mother wanted to improve her health. At the 2003 SEA Games, she won gold medals with the team and on the uneven bars. Then at the 2005 SEA Games, she won the individual all-around title and won another gold medal on the uneven bars. She won the balance beam gold medal at the 2007 SEA Games. She competed at her first World Championships in 2007 and finished 110th in the all-around qualifications.

Ngân Thương participated in the 2008 Summer Olympics, where she became the first gymnast to represent Vietnam in Olympic competition. She competed only in the preliminary round of competition, where among 82 gymnasts, she placed 15th on vault, 51st on balance beam, 79th on uneven bars, 82nd on floor exercise and 59th overall, and did not qualify for the all-around or individual event finals. On August 15, 2008, the International Olympic Committee announced that Ngân Thương had tested positive for the banned substance furosemide. IOC medical commission chairman Arne Ljungqvist stated that Ngân Thương's use of furosemide was likely to be accidental, and the result of receiving poor information on doping restrictions. Nonetheless, she was expelled from the Olympic Games and her athlete accreditation was revoked.

After returning to Vietnam, Ngân Thương admitted she took diuretics for weight loss and did not know they contained banned substances. She accepted a one-year ban on competing from the International Gymnastics Federation, and she announced her initial retirement.

Ngân Thương decided to return to competition at the conclusion of her ban. She competed on the uneven bars, balance beam, and floor exercise at the 2009 World Championships and did not advance into any finals. At the 2010 Asian Games, she finished eighth in the all-around final and seventh in the vault and floor exercise finals. Despite competing with an injured ankle, she won gold medals on the uneven bars and balance beam at the 2011 SEA Games, and she won the all-around silver medal behind teammate Phan Thị Hà Thanh.

Ngân Thương competed at the 2012 Olympic Test Event and finished 73rd in the all-around and earned the final berth to the 2012 Summer Olympics. There, she competed on the uneven bars and balance beam and finished 73rd and 70th, respectively. She announced her retirement from the sport in 2013.
