= He Kexin =

Chinese artistic gymnast

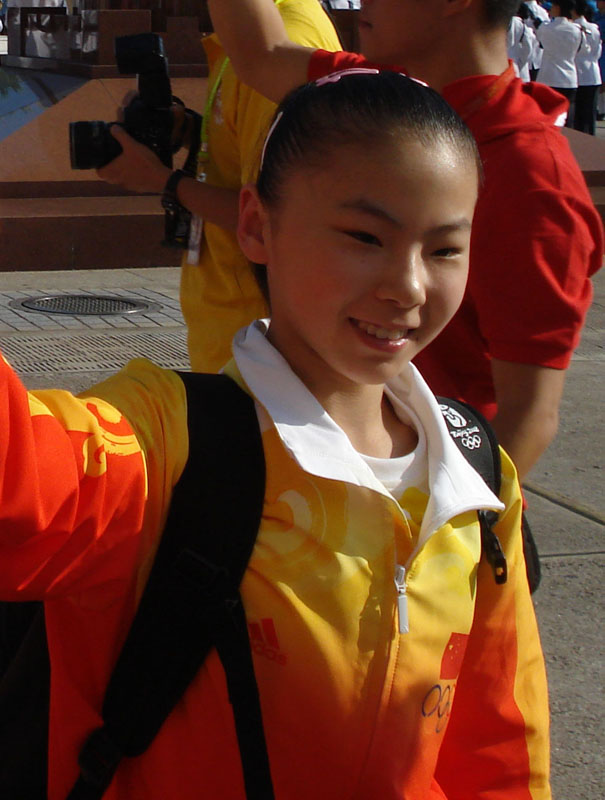
- Kexin on August 30, 2008

Personal information
- Full name: He Kexin (何可欣)
- Born: January 1, 1992 (age 34) (see Age controversy below) Beijing, China
- Height: 147 cm (4 ft 10 in)

Gymnastics career
- Discipline: Women's artistic gymnastics
- Country represented: China (2007–12 (CHN))
- Club: Beijing Gymnastics Team
- Head coaches: Liu Guicheng, He Hua
- Music: Boléro by Maurice Ravel (2010–11)
- Retired: 2013
Medal record
Women's artistic gymnastics
Representing China
Event	1st	2nd	3rd
Olympic Games	2	1	0
World Championships	1	0	2
World Cup Final	1	0	0
Asian Games	2	0	0
National Games	1	0	1
Total	7	1	3
Summer Olympics
Gold medal – first place	2008 Beijing	Team
Gold medal – first place	2008 Beijing	Uneven Bars
Silver medal – second place	2012 London	Uneven Bars
World Championships
Gold medal – first place	2009 London	Uneven Bars
Bronze medal – third place	2010 Rotterdam	Team
Bronze medal – third place	2011 Tokyo	Team
World Cup Final
Gold medal – first place	2008 Madrid	Uneven Bars
Asian Games
Gold medal – first place	2010 Guangzhou	Team
Gold medal – first place	2010 Guangzhou	Uneven Bars
National Games
Gold medal – first place	2009 Jinan	Uneven Bars
Bronze medal – third place	2009 Jinan	Team

He Kexin
- Chinese: 何可欣
Transcriptions
Standard Mandarin
- Hanyu Pinyin: Hé Kěxīn
- IPA: xɤ̌ kʰɤ̀ɕín

He Kexin (born January 1, 1992) is a Chinese former artistic gymnast who competed at the 2008 and 2012 Summer Olympics. At the 2008 Olympics in Beijing, she won gold medals on the uneven bars and as a member of the Chinese team. She was one of only a few gymnasts to score over 17.00 under the 2006–2008 Code of Points, and her 7.7 difficulty score on bars in 2008 was one of the highest in the world.

As with several of her teammates, questions were raised in the international press when earlier reports surfaced indicating she may not have been old enough to compete in the 2008 Olympics; however, an official investigation found in her favor. She continued her success in the post-Beijing Olympics period; she holds the record for the highest obtained difficulty in the entire London period. In the team final at the 2010 World Championships, she scored 16.133 with a 7.4 difficulty, one of the highest scores achieved in women's gymnastics between 2009 and 2012.

== Gymnastics career ==
He Kexin began training at the Shichahai Sports School in Beijing in 1997. She participated in China's National Games in 2006 and Intercity Games in 2007. According to China Daily, Kexin was recruited for the Chinese National Team in 2007, after her uneven bars win at the Intercity Games drew the attention of head coach Huang Yubin.

She made her international debut in 2008, participating in several events on the World Cup circuit. At her first meet, the World Cup in Doha, she scored 16.550 on the uneven bars; at her second, the Cottbus Cup, she scored 16.800. The mark was the highest uneven bars score posted at an international event under the Code of Points at the time, besting Nastia Liukin's mark of 16.65 at the 2008 Pacific Rim Championships. On May 15, 2008, He participated in the Tianjin World Cup, breaking two world records.

At the 2008 Olympics, He was a member of the gold medal-winning Chinese team. In the uneven bars final, she and Liukin both posted final marks of 16.725, and earned identical A- and B-panel scores of 7.70 and 9.025, respectively. Because He's individual B-panel marks had a lower variance, she won the gold medal as per the Olympic tiebreaker rules of the Fédération Internationale de Gymnastique (FIG).

At the 2009 World Championships in London, she defended her bars title and won a gold medal with a score of 16.000, posting a 7.1 D-score.

During the team finals in the 2010 World Artistic Gymnastics Championships, He contributed the highest score of the night to her team total, 16.133 with 7.4 difficulty. This was the highest difficulty for the entire London Olympic period on all four pieces of apparatus and her score of 16.133 on bars was the highest ever achieved at the time. However, a fall in the event final left her out of the medals. In the qualifications of the 2011 World Championships, she fell and did not make the bars event final. Although she did not compete in any event in the team final, she remained on the Chinese team, which won the bronze medal.

He was named to the 2012 Olympic team over 2008 teammate Jiang Yuyuan and 2011 World team member Tan Sixin, because her speciality was regarded as a better complement to the fourth team member, Deng Linlin. At the Olympics, she qualified in second place to the uneven bars event final. She finished in second, behind gold medalist Aliya Mustafina of Russia, with a score of 15.933, making her the only Chinese female gymnast to medal in the same event at two consecutive Olympics.

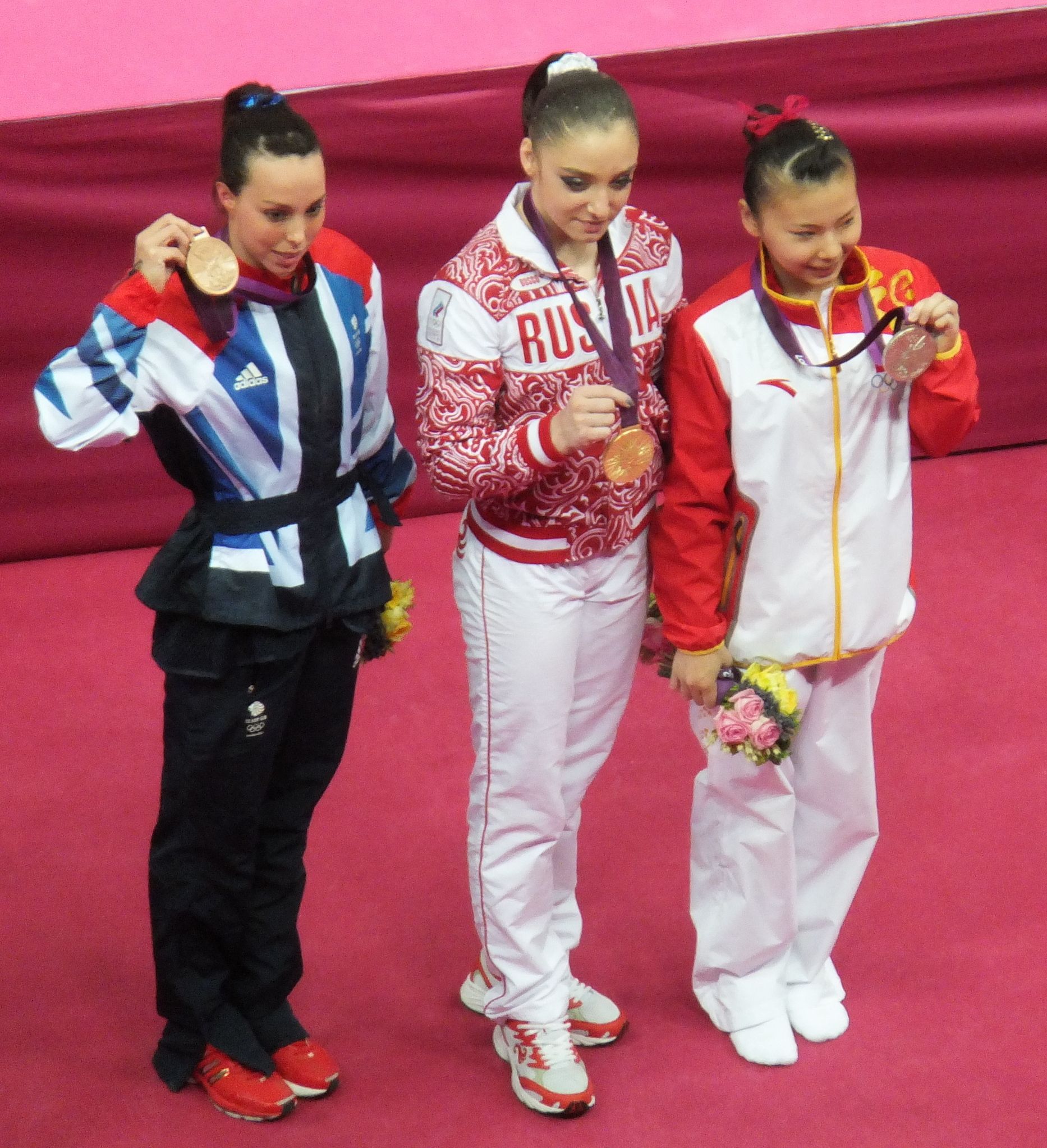
He Kexin (right) with her silver medal from the 2012 Olympic uneven bars final

She is one of only five Chinese female gymnasts to make two Olympic teams, along with Liu Xuan, Kui Yuanyuan, 2008 team captain Cheng Fei, and Deng Linlin.

== Age controversy ==
During and after the 2008 Summer Olympics, He Kexin's actual age became the subject of controversy; her passport and the Chinese Olympic Committee list her date of birth as January 1, 1992, which would make her 16 years, 220 days old during the 2008 Olympic opening ceremonies and therefore old enough to compete. However, before the 2008 Olympics, He's age was reported by the Chinese press, including the state news service, Xinhua, as 13 in 2007 and 14 in 2008 in news articles that were later taken off-line. Her birth date has also been given on several registration lists of the General Administration of Sport in China, the Chengdu Sports Bureau and other registration sources as January 1, 1994, which would have made her 14 years, 220 days old during the opening ceremonies, and therefore too young to participate. Chinese officials maintained that He was in fact old enough to compete, stating that Xinhua had not confirmed He's age before filing their news reports and attributing the discrepancies to faulty paperwork when He was transferred from Beijing to Hubei. She herself, speaking to reporters after the 2008 Olympic team final, said, "My real age is 16. I don't care what other people say." In another interview, she said, "I don't get upset because I have answered this question many times. There's no need to explain anymore." On August 2, the International Olympic Committee stated that it would not investigate the discrepancy in He's reported age because the FIG's own verification system was sufficient proof of eligibility. The FIG, in responding to the situation, said that it would not ask for additional proof of age beyond the passport already supplied by Chinese officials.

However, the matter continued to be a source of controversy among members of the gymnastics community and the media. The Times reported that a computer expert "Stryde" had recovered one of the deleted registration lists showing He's birth date as January 1, 1994, through cached pages on the search engine Baidu. On August 21, the IOC announced that it had asked the FIG to open an investigation into He and her teammates' ages. On August 22, 2008, the IOC said it had not uncovered any evidence of wrongdoing "so far" and expressed confidence that the Chinese Federation's documents were correct. However, the FIG held an emergency meeting about the situation on August 23 and requested additional documentation for every gymnast on the Chinese team, with the exception of Cheng Fei. On August 24, a Chinese official addressed the registration lists found online, stating that the discrepancy was due to an administrative error that took place when He was transferred between teams while participating in the InterCity Games in 2007.

On October 1, 2008, the FIG concluded its investigation, finding that He and her Olympic teammates were old enough to compete, although some international media outlets remained skeptical.

== Competitive history ==
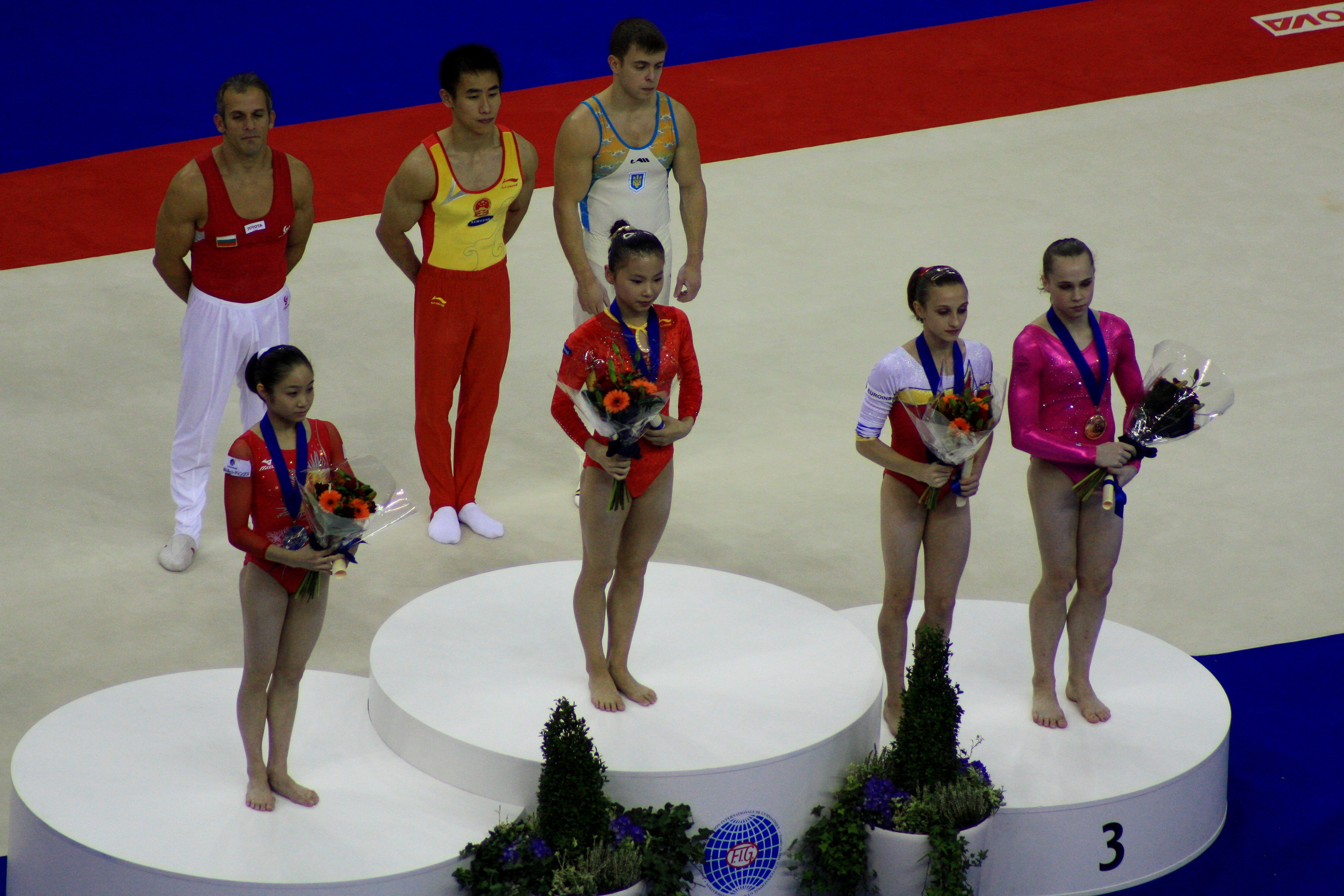
He Kexin with her gold medal on uneven bars from the 2009 World Championships

Year	Competition Description	Location	Apparatus	Rank-Final	Score-Final	Rank-Qualifying	Score-Qualifying
2012	Olympic Games	London	Team	4	174.43	3	176.637
2012	Olympic Games	London	Uneven Bars	2	15.933	2	15.966
2011	World Championships	Tokyo	Team	3	172.82	3	230.370
2011	World Championships	Tokyo	Uneven Bars			80	12.733
2010	Asian Games	Guangzhou	Team	1	234.150		
2010	Asian Games	Guangzhou	Uneven Bars	1	16.425	1	16.100
2010	World Championships	Rotterdam	Team	3	174.781	2	233.778
2010	World Championships	Rotterdam	Uneven Bars	7	13.966	1	16.066
2009	World Championships	London	Uneven Bars	1	16.000	1	15.975
2008	World Cup/Series	Cottbus	Uneven Bars	1	16.850	1	16.800
2008	World Cup/Series	Doha	Uneven Bars	1	16.550	1	16.450
2008	Olympic Games	Beijing	Team	1	188.900	1	248.275
2008	Olympic Games	Beijing	Uneven bars	1	16.725	6	15.725
2008	World Cup/Final	Madrid	Uneven Bars	1	16.250		

== Floor Music ==
- 2008 "Travel to India" (Track14) and "The Awakening" (track 16) from Jackie Chan's Movie "The Myth" soundtrack
- 2010 Aankhein Khuli by Jatin Lalit
