= Jo Hyun-joo =

South Korean artistic gymnast (born 1992)

- Born: 13 December 1992 (age 33) Ulsan, South Korea
- Height: 139 cm (4 ft 7 in)

Gymnastics career
- Discipline: Women's artistic gymnastics
- Country represented: South Korea
- Head coach: Kim Yoon-gi
- Assistant coach: Seo Jung-soo
Medal record
Representing South Korea
Asian Games
Bronze medal – third place	2010 Guangzhou	Floor exercise
Asian Championships
Silver medal – second place	2008 Doha	Team
Summer Universiade
Gold medal – first place	2011 Shenzhen	Vault

- Jo Hyun-joo
- Hangul: 조현주
- Hanja: 趙賢珠
- RR: Jo Hyeonju
- MR: Cho Hyŏnju

Jo Hyun-joo (born 13 December 1992) is a South Korean former artistic gymnast. She is the 2010 Asian Games floor exercise bronze medalist and the 2011 Summer Universiade vault champion. She represented her country at the 2008 Summer Olympics and at various World Championships from 2007 to 2011 and was the first South Korean female gymnast to compete in a World Championships apparatus final.

== Gymnastics career ==
Jo began artistic gymnastics in 2004 and joined the junior national team two years later. She competed at the 2007 World Championships and placed 62nd in the all-around qualifications. She then represented South Korea at the 2008 Summer Olympics and finished 58th in the all-around qualifications after falling off both the uneven bars and the balance beam. At the 2008 Asian Championships, she helped South Korea win the team silver medal, behind Japan.

Jo finished 45th in the all-around qualifications at the 2009 World Championships. She competed with the team that placed 20th at the 2010 World Championships, the best result for the South Korean women's national team since 1997. Individually, Jo became the first South Korean female gymnast to advance into a World Championships apparatus final by finishing sixth on the vault. At the 2010 Asian Games, she was favored to win a medal on the vault, but she fell on her first vault and finished fourth. She went on to win a bronze medal on the floor exercise instead.

Jo won a gold medal on the vault and a bronze medal on the balance beam at the 2011 Korean Cup. At the 2011 Summer Universiade, Jo fell off the uneven bars during the all-around final and landed head-first. She was taken to the hospital but was released four hours later as the injury to her neck was not severe. She returned to competition the next day in the vault final, where she won the gold medal. She withdrew from the uneven bars final but did compete in the balance beam and floor exercise finals, finishing fifth and sixth, respectively. At the 2011 World Championships, Jo finished ninth in the vault qualifications, making her the first reserve for the apparatus final. Additionally, the South Korea team placed 16th and earned a berth to the 2012 Olympic Test Event. There, the team placed sixth and did not advance to the Olympic Games, and Jo did not win the one individual berth South Korea earned.
