= Rie Tanaka (gymnast) =

Japanese artistic gymnast (born 1987)

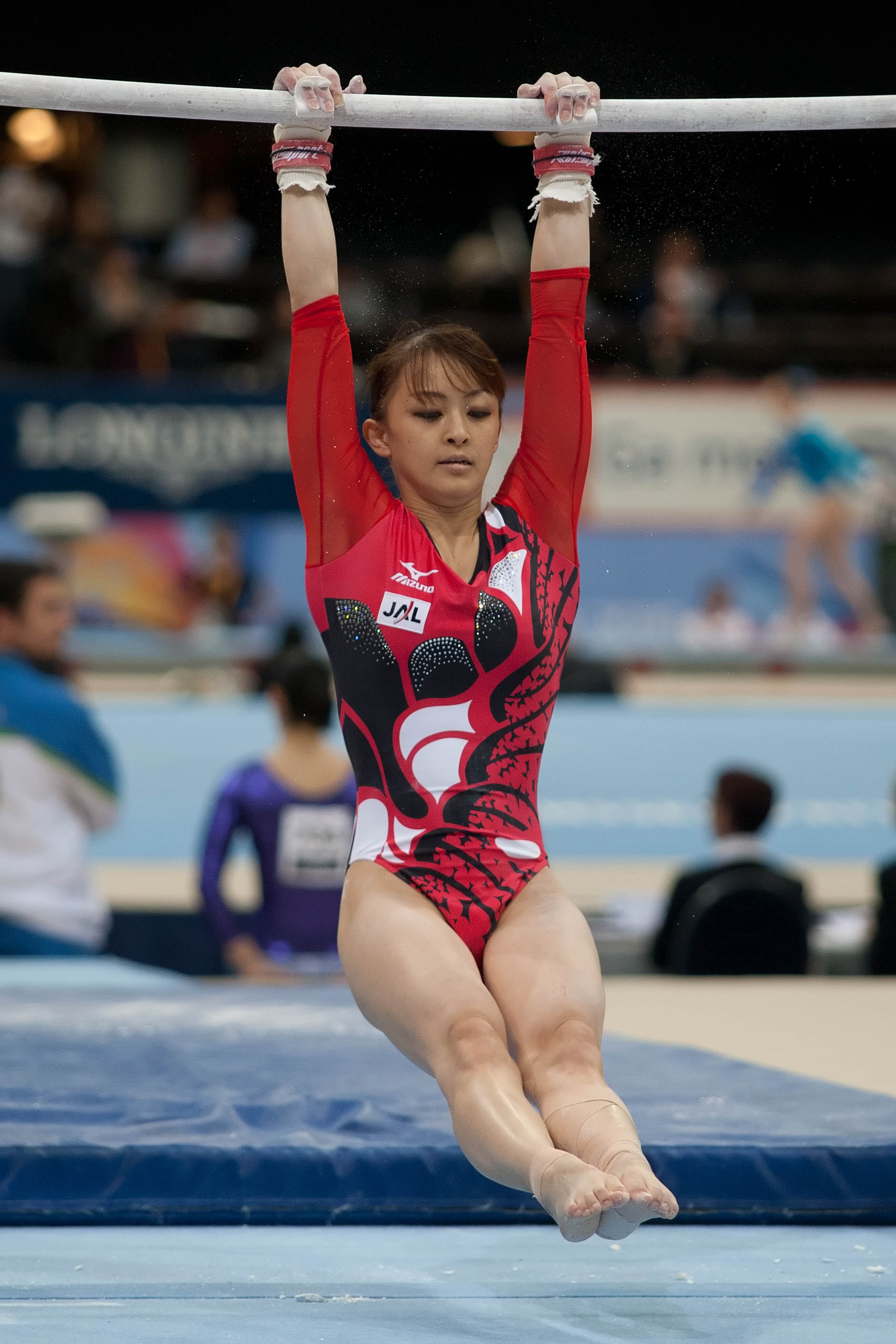
- Tanaka in 2010

Personal information
- Full name: Rie Tanaka
- Born: June 11, 1987 (age 39) Iwade, Wakayama, Japan
- Height: 1.57 m (5 ft 2 in)

Gymnastics career
- Discipline: Women's artistic gymnastics
- Country represented: Japan; (2008–2012)
- Head coach: Seo Kyoko
Medal record
Representing Japan
Asian Games
Silver medal – second place	2010 Guangzhou	Team
Silver medal – second place	2010 Guangzhou	Vault
Bronze medal – third place	2010 Guangzhou	All-Around
Universiade
Bronze medal – third place	2009 Belgrade	Team

Rie Tanaka (田中 理恵, Tanaka Rie; born 11 June 1987) is a Japanese retired artistic gymnast. She won the 2010 Longines Prize for Elegance and competed at the 2012 London Olympics. Her brothers, Kazuhito Tanaka and Yusuke Tanaka, were also Olympic artistic gymnasts.

== Career ==
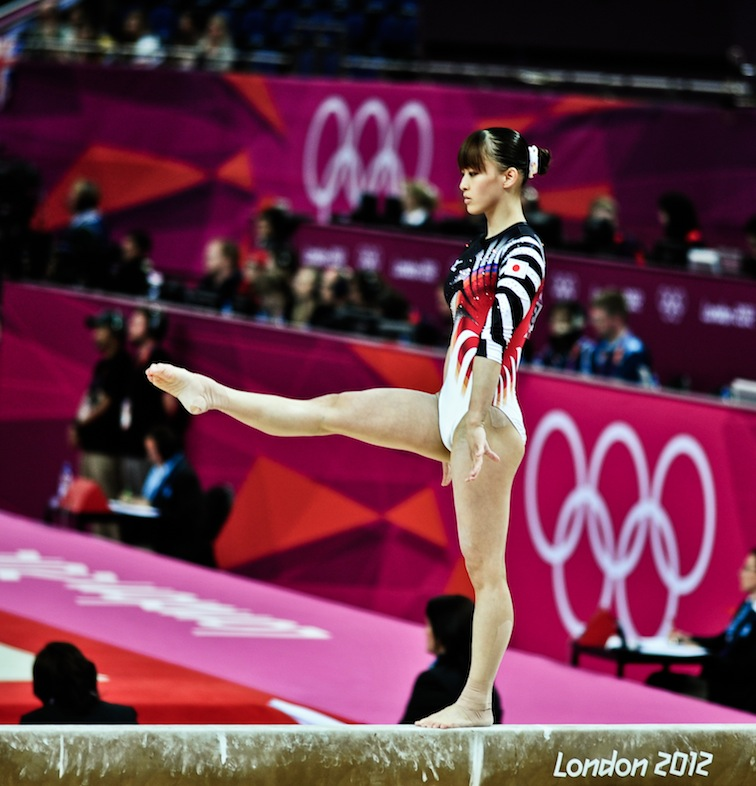
Rie Tanaka on the balance beam, London, July 2012

Tanaka was awarded the Longines Prize for Elegance at the 2010 World Championships in Rotterdam. She qualified to the all-around final in 14th place with a score of 55.699, and finished with a score of 55.332 in 17th place. She did not qualify to any event finals, but competed alongside the rest of the Japanese team in team finals, where they finished fifth with a score of 169.897.

Tanaka competed at the 2011 World Championships in Tokyo. She qualified to the all-around final in 19th place and finished 20th with a score of 54.699, but did not qualify to any event finals. In team finals, Japan finished seventh with a score of 167.122.

Tanaka won the all-around at the NHK Cup in May 2012 with a score of 55.650, securing her spot on the Olympic team.

=== 2012 London Olympics ===
Tanaka and her brothers, Kazuhito Tanaka and Yusuke Tanaka, were all selected to represent Japan in artistic gymnastics at London 2012. This was the first time three siblings competed in gymnastics at the same Olympic Games. Kazuhito and Yusuke won silver for Japan in the men's team competition.

At London 2012, Tanaka was the women's artistic gymnastics team captain. The Japanese women's team finished eighth in the team all-around with a score of 166.646. Tanaka qualified for the individual all-around, where she finished 16th with a score of 55.632: 14.166 on vault, 14.500 on uneven bars, 13.700 on balance beam and 13.266 on floor exercise.
