= 2007 World Artistic Gymnastics Championships =

Gymnastics competition

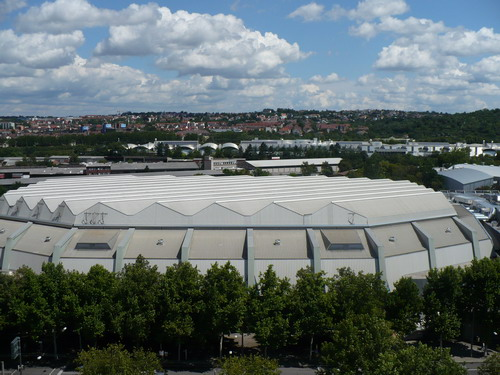
- Venue: Hanns-Martin-Schleyer-Halle
- Location: Stuttgart, Germany
- Start date: September 1, 2007
- End date: September 9, 2007

The 40th World Artistic Gymnastics Championships were held at the Hanns-Martin-Schleyer-Halle in Stuttgart, Germany, from 1 to 9 September 2007.

== Medal summary ==
Event	Gold	Silver	Bronze
Men
Team all-around	China; Yang Wei; Huang Xu; Chen Yibing; Xiao Qin; Zou Kai; Liang Fuliang	Japan; Hisashi Mizutori; Hiroyuki Tomita; Yosuke Hoshi; Makoto Okiguchi; Takuya Nakase; Shun Kuwahara	Germany; Fabian Hambüchen; Eugen Spiridonov; Robert Juckel; Marcel Nguyen; Thomas Angergassen; Philipp Boy
Individual all-around	Yang Wei (CHN)	Fabian Hambüchen (GER)	Hisashi Mizutori (JPN)
Floor	Diego Hypólito (BRA)	Gervasio Deferr (ESP)	Hisashi Mizutori (JPN)
Pommel horse	Xiao Qin (CHN)	Krisztián Berki (HUN)	Louis Smith (GBR)
Rings	Chen Yibing (CHN)	Yuri van Gelder (NED)	Yordan Yovchev (BUL)
Vault	Leszek Blanik (POL)	Ilie Daniel Popescu (ROU)	Ri Se-Gwang (PRK)
Parallel bars	Mitja Petkovšek (SLO) Kim Dae-Eun (KOR)	none awarded	Anton Fokin (UZB)
Horizontal bar	Fabian Hambüchen (GER)	Aljaž Pegan (SLO)	Hisashi Mizutori (JPN)
Women
Team all-around	United States; Shawn Johnson; Alicia Sacramone; Nastia Liukin; Shayla Worley; Samantha Peszek; Ivana Hong	China; Cheng Fei; Jiang Yuyuan; Yang Yilin; Li Shanshan; Xiao Sha; He Ning	Romania; Steliana Nistor; Sandra Izbașa; Cătălina Ponor; Daniela Druncea; Cerasela Pătrașcu; Andreea Grigore
Individual all-around	Shawn Johnson (USA)	Steliana Nistor (ROU)	Jade Barbosa (BRA) Vanessa Ferrari (ITA)
Vault	Cheng Fei (CHN)	Hong Su Jong (PRK)	Alicia Sacramone (USA)
Uneven bars	Ksenia Semenova (RUS)	Nastia Liukin (USA)	Yang Yilin (CHN)
Balance beam	Nastia Liukin (USA)	Steliana Nistor (ROU) Li Shanshan (CHN)	none awarded
Floor	Shawn Johnson (USA)	Alicia Sacramone (USA)	Cassy Vericel (FRA)

== Men's results ==
=== Qualification ===
Oldest and youngest competitors

Men	Name	Country	Date of birth	Age
Youngest	Shek Wai-Hung	Hong Kong	10/10/91	15 years
Oldest	Espen Jansen	Norway	13/12/68	38 years

Rank	Team	Floor (gymnastics)	Pommel horse	Rings (gymnastics)	Vault (gymnastics)	Parallel bars	Horizontal bar	Total
1	Yang Wei (CHN)	14.8	15.475	16.35	16.5	16.375	14.425	93.925 Q
2	Hiroyuki Tomita (JPN)	14.95	15.375	16.125	15.875	16	15.3	93.625 Q
3	Hisashi Mizutori (JPN)	15.7	14.425	14.975	16.1	15.95	15.425	92.575 Q
4	Fabian Hambüchen (GER)	15.45	14.3	14.7	16.275	15.625	16.025	92.375 Q
5	Maksim Devyatovskiy (RUS)	15	15.125	15.475	16.225	15.425	14.35	91.600 Q
6	Liang Fuliang (CHN)	15.7	15.15	15.15	16.075	15.6	13.575	91.250 Q
7	Răzvan Șelariu (ROU)	15.675	14.475	15.225	16.275	15.075	14.4	91.125 Q
8	Rafael Martínez (ESP)	15.525	14.85	14.9	16.1	14.9	14.65	90.925 Q
9	Jonathan Horton (USA)	15.475	14.15	15.325	15.375	15.5	15.075	90.900 Q
10	Philipp Boy (GER)	15.05	14.65	14.975	15.875	15.175	14.725	90.450 Q
11	Yury Ryazanov (RUS)	15.125	14.45	15.025	15.6	15.525	14.675	90.400 Q
12	Flavius Koczi (ROU)	15.075	15.35	14.4	16.5	14.65	14.175	90.150 Q
13	Yordan Yovchev (BUL)	15.35	12.625	16.575	15.825	14.95	14.4	89.725 Q
14	Claudio Capelli (SUI)	15.625	14.425	14.3	16	15.1	14.25	89.700 Q
15	Anton Fokin (UZB)	14.4	14.9	14.65	15.425	16.125	14.125	89.625 Q
16	Enrico Pozzo (ITA)	15.3	14.325	14.075	15.7	14.925	15.225	89.550 Q
17	Kim Dae-Eun (KOR)	15.5	13.975	14.75	15.175	16.025	13.95	89.375 Q
18	Vlasios Maras (GRE)	14.725	14.2	14.45	15.675	15.025	15.3	89.375 Q
19	Sergei Khorokhordin (RUS)	14.8	14.25	14.85	15.625	14.825	14.875	89.225
20	Ilie Daniel Popescu (ROU)	14.8	15.15	14.975	16.7	13.875	13.675	89.175
21	Dzmitry Savitski (BLR)	15.35	14.225	15.225	15.3	15.825	13.225	89.150 Q
22	Yang Tae-Young (KOR)	14.375	14.275	14.425	16.075	16	14	89.150 Q
23	Filip Ude (CRO)	15.4	14.775	14.075	15.725	14.575	14.225	88.775 Q
24	David Kikuchi (CAN)	14.475	14.4	15.325	15.475	15.05	14.025	88.750 Q
25	Casey Sandy (CAN)	14.675	14.675	14.625	15.5	15.1	14.15	88.725 Q
26	José Luis Fuentes (VEN)	14.075	15	14.55	15.475	15.175	14.425	88.700 Q
27	David Durante (USA)	14.225	14.5	14.625	15.625	15.075	14.625	88.675 R
28	Luis Rivera (PUR)	15.175	14.925	14.575	15.75	14.225	14	88.650 R
29	Epke Zonderland (NED)	13.8	13.2	14.8	15.7	15.575	15.45	88.525 R
30	Vadym Kuvakin (UKR)	14.55	13.8	14.75	16.175	15.025	14.225	88.525 R
31	Matteo Morandi (ITA)	14.075	14.075	15.55	15.9	15.05	13.8	88.45
32	Daniel Keatings (GBR)	14.1	15.675	13.55	15.75	15.15	14.175	88.4
33	Benoît Caranobe (FRA)	14.775	13.775	14.75	16.025	15.125	13.9	88.35
34	Jeffrey Wammes (NED)	14.825	13.25	14.825	15.975	14.15	15.225	88.25
35	Guillermo Alvarez (USA)	15.7	13.5	14.65	15.65	14.675	14	88.175
36	Diego Hypólito (BRA)	16.05	13.625	13.95	15.75	14.25	13.925	87.55
37	Roman Zozulya (UKR)	14.25	13.4	15.625	15.4	14.625	14.05	87.35
38	Sergio Muñoz (ESP)	14.75	14.275	14.1	16.075	14.175	13.95	87.325
39	Daniel Groves (SUI)	14.9	14.275	13.95	14.9	14.825	14.45	87.3
40	Denis Savenkov (BLR)	14.8	13.3	14	15.525	14.875	14.5	87
41	Alexander Rodríguez (PUR)	15	14.875	12.4	15.575	14	14.975	86.825
42	Martin Konečný (CZE)	14.8	13.9	14.325	15.15	14.55	14.1	86.825
43	Ilia Giorgadze (GEO)	14.775	13.625	14.475	15.55	15.475	12.9	86.8
44	Róbert Gál (HUN)	14.825	13.725	14.575	15.325	14.75	13.525	86.725
45	Dimitrios Markousis (GRE)	14.125	13.9	14.275	15.6	14.775	14.05	86.725
46	Koen Van Damme (BEL)	14.55	14.25	14.4	14.675	14.825	14.025	86.725
47	Victor Rosa (BRA)	15.275	12.975	13.7	15.625	14.9	14.225	86.7
48	Luis Vargas (PUR)	14.6	14.225	14.975	15.65	13.175	14.05	86.675
49	Christos Lympanovnos (GRE)	13.75	14.025	14.675	15.575	14.825	13.825	86.675
50	Sascha Palgen (LUX)	14.8	13.675	14.275	15.35	14.7	13.825	86.625
51	Sam Simpson (AUS)	15.025	14.45	14.125	15.525	14.1	13.325	86.55
52	Joshua Jefferis (AUS)	14.4	12.525	14.25	15.5	15.325	14.525	86.525
53	Alexander Shatilov (ISR)	15.825	12.875	14.05	15.725	14.1	13.875	86.45
54	Jorge Hugo Giraldo (COL)	14.175	14.475	14.625	15.45	14.525	13.175	86.425
55	Pavel Gofman (ISR)	14.95	13.525	14.375	14.7	14.975	13.475	86
56	Sami Aalto (FIN)	14.5	13.2	14.525	15.625	13.925	14.175	85.95
57	Kristian Thomas (GBR)	15.2	13.425	13.475	15.625	14.15	13.875	85.75
58	Timur Kurbanbayev (KAZ)	13.675	13.7	15.75	14.875	14.025	13.575	85.6
59	Dimitri Trefilovs (LAT)	14.075	14.75	13.725	14.8	14.525	13.725	85.6
60	Luiz Dos Anjos (BRA)	14.25	12.925	14.425	14.525	15.2	14.2	85.525
61	Manuel Campos (POR)	15.25	13.375	14.425	15.125	14.725	12.55	85.45
62	Luis Sosa (MEX)	14.525	13.875	13.875	15.475	14.525	13.15	85.425
63	Tomás González (CHI)	15.25	13.525	12.275	15.9	14.525	13.725	85.2
64	Marcell Hetrovics (HUN)	14.15	13.825	13.25	15.825	14.225	13.9	85.175
65	Samuel Offord (AUS)	13.975	13.175	14.875	15.375	13.85	13.875	85.125
66	Leszek Blanik (POL)	14.075	13.25	13.45	16.55	14.35	13.25	84.925
67	Ro Chol-Jin (PRK)	13.075	12.4	14.25	15.575	15.325	14.075	84.7
68	Alen Dimic (SLO)	12.9	13.7	13.225	15.875	14.975	13.875	84.55
69	Mohamed Serour (EGY)	14.025	13.125	13.625	15.8	13.975	13.875	84.425
70	Vahagn Stepanyan (ARM)	14.575	12.3	15.075	14.35	14.125	13.975	84.4
71	Kamil Hulboj (POL)	13.975	13.1	13.8	15.325	15.275	12.925	84.4
72	Jevgēņijs Saproņenko (LAT)	14.55	13.3	13.05	15.25	13.6	14.65	84.4
73	Federico Molinari (ARG)	13.15	13.7	14.175	14.7	14.775	13.65	84.15
74	Jani Tanskanen (FIN)	13.95	13.05	13.6	15.1	13.95	14.425	84.075
75	Wajdi Bouallègue (TUN)	13.875	13.55	13.95	15.375	14.3	13	84.05
76	Stepan Gorbachev (KAZ)	14.35	13.875	13.125	15.35	14.1	13.25	84.05
77	Helge Vammen (DEN)	13.825	13.175	13.525	15.5	14.075	13.95	84.05
78	Krzysztof Muchorski (POL)	14.125	13.3	14.325	15.15	13.975	13.15	84.025
79	Samuel Piasecký (SVK)	14.625	13.825	13.8	15.4	14.525	11.725	83.9
80	Runar Alexandersson (ISL)	14.05	13.85	14.2	14.675	14.625	12.175	83.575
81	Evgeni Zorins (LAT)	14.3	13.6	13.15	14.75	13.55	14.175	83.525
82	Herre Zonderland (NED)	13.95	12.775	13.625	15.25	14.125	13.75	83.475
83	Pedro Almeida (POR)	14.525	11.725	13.725	15.225	14.425	13.675	83.3
84	Huang Che-Kuei (TPE)	13	15.075	13.975	14.575	13	13.5	83.125
85	Fabian Leimlehner (AUT)	13.575	13.175	13.975	14.625	14.7	13.05	83.1
86	Espen Jansen (NOR)	13.525	12.725	14.025	15.175	14.125	13.3	82.875
87	Lin Hsiang-Wei (TPE)	14.475	14.275	14.1	14.25	13.35	12.325	82.775
88	Yousef Sebti (ALG)	13.775	13.4	12.825	14.75	13.775	14.225	82.75
89	Mikhail Koudinov (NZL)	14.475	13.575	13.35	14.625	14.425	12.15	82.6
90	Sid Ali Ferdjani (ALG)	12.4	14	13.975	14.5	14.525	13.175	82.575
91	Linas Gaveika (LTU)	13.1	12.925	13.375	14.55	14.275	14.3	82.525
92	Günther Couckhuyt (BEL)	13.4	14.025	13.275	14.625	14	13.025	82.35
93	Fabian Arley Mesa (COL)	13.025	14.375	11.675	14.625	14.525	14.075	82.3
94	Tamer Ragab (EGY)	13.725	13.725	12.925	14.225	14.1	13.575	82.275
95	Jeppe Villekjaer (DEN)	14.2	13.025	13.55	14.775	13.95	12.675	82.175
96	Eduard Gholub (ISR)	13.325	12.875	13.675	14.8	13.875	13.55	82.1
97	Daniel Corral (MEX)	13.175	12.925	12.85	15.625	14.6	12.825	82
98	Kaewpanya Rartchawat (THA)	12.6	13.725	12.775	15.725	13.9	13.2	81.925
99	Huang Tai-I (TPE)	13.35	13.875	13.75	14.625	13.75	12.525	81.875
100	Florin Purge (DEN)	13.25	13.65	13.425	13.775	14.025	13.725	81.85
101	Troy Sender (RSA)	13	13.775	13.225	14.35	14.15	13.25	81.75
102	Irodotos Georgallas (CYP)	12.4	13.25	15.1	15.05	13.275	12.475	81.55
103	Wei Siang Ooi (MAS)	13.175	13.55	12.4	15.35	13.55	13.325	81.35
104	Nejad Hadi Khannari (IRI)	13.75	13.175	13.5	14.6	13.475	12.725	81.225
105	Joachim Hanche Olsen (NOR)	13.525	13.25	13.05	14.7	13.225	13.4	81.15
106	Fatah Ait Saada (ALG)	13.55	12.575	14.6	14.6	13.675	12.075	81.075
107	Gabriel Rossi (AUT)	12.325	13.5	13.15	15.375	13.975	12.7	81.025
108	Viktor Kristmannsson (ISL)	13.775	12.25	13.225	14.8	13.625	13.325	81
109	Matthew Cosgrave (IRL)	13.425	13.625	12.975	14.6	13.9	12.475	81
110	Riku Koivunen (FIN)	13	12.75	13.775	14.725	12.65	14.05	80.95
111	Lucas Chiarlo (ARG)	13.275	13.325	13.05	14.05	13.2	13.8	80.7
112	Sado Batsiyev (KAZ)	14.05	13.45	13.725	15.1	13.425	10.875	80.625
113	Jevgenij Izmodenov (LTU)	13.775	11.175	13.075	14.325	14.175	14.05	80.575
114	Joaquín Ramirez (MEX)	14.175	11.8	12.675	15.725	13.35	12.8	80.525
115	Petr Smejkal (CZE)	13.075	12.575	13.35	14.8	13.4	13.3	80.5
116	Marco Baldauf (AUT)	12.375	12.75	12.4	14.05	14	14.425	80
117	Karim Aly Mohamed (EGY)	12.675	11.65	13	15.425	14.1	13.075	79.925
118	Wan Foong Lum (MAS)	12.55	12.725	12.8	15.375	13.45	12.9	79.8
119	Cristian Brezeanu (RSA)	13.875	13.025	13.85	15.5	12.85	10.575	79.675
120	Shek Wai-Hung (HKG)	13.675	11.35	12.35	15.325	14	12.95	79.65
121	Rokas Guščinas (LTU)	13.25	13.225	11.525	14.575	13.075	13.825	79.475
122	Artyom Avetyan (ARM)	13.55	11.25	13.325	15.125	12.9	13.15	79.3
123	Milos Paunovic (SRB)	12.975	12.725	13.575	14.7	12.825	12.475	79.275
124	Lars Jorgen Fjeld (NOR)	13.875	11.775	12.625	14.775	13.05	13.15	79.25
125	Aca Antic (SRB)	13.825	11.925	13.15	14.475	13.575	12.275	79.225
126	Constantinos Aristotelous (CYP)	13.125	11.65	12.725	15.575	11.4	14.15	78.625
127	Patrik Hagelin (SWE)	11.975	12.325	13.55	14.6	12.45	13.15	78.05
128	Andres Saavedra (ECU)	12.075	12.3	12.65	14.4	13.625	12.775	77.825
129	Chen Yibing (CHN)	15.075	14.75	16.6	16.025	15.025		77.475
130	Alon Hasa (ALB)	12.65	12.275	12.675	14.25	12.85	12.7	77.4
131	Xiao Qin (CHN)	14.3	16.275		15.675	15.875	15.1	77.225
132	Didier Yamit Lugo (COL)	12.875	12.225	13.425	14.45	13.175	10.95	77.1
133	Fadi Bahlawan (SYR)	12.7	12.7	13.95	12.7	12.35	12.575	76.975
134	Sabuhi Aslanov (AZE)	12.375	12	12.975	14.575	12.175	12.425	76.525
135	Alexander Artemev (USA)	14.75	15.375		15.95	15.4	14.825	76.3
136	Mohammed Abasaleh (JOR)	13.775	8.625	12	15.6	13.25	12.95	76.2
137	Mahmood Alsadi (QAT)	12.925	12.475	12.025	13.525	12.725	12.525	76.2
138	Gaël Da Silva (FRA)	15.45		14.725	16.05	15.7	14.275	76.2
139	Yosuke Hoshi (JPN)	15	14.55		15.6	16	15	76.15
140	Takuya Nakase (JPN)	15.675		15.25	15.425	14.6	15.025	75.975
141	Nicolas Boeschenstein (SUI)	15.1		14.825	16.2	15.475	14.125	75.725
142	Mohd Azzam Azmi (MAS)	13.925	11.725	11.55	14.175	12.025	12.025	75.425
143	Yoo Won-chul (KOR)	14.75	13.95	14.9	15.5	16.275		75.375
144	Roel Ramirez (PHI)	13.55	11.75	10.925	15.4	11.15	12.425	75.2
145	Osvaldo Martínez Erazun (ARG)	12.675	10.4	12.9	13.725	13.425	11.975	75.1
146	Kim Soo-Myun (KOR)	15.675		13.95	15.65	15.35	14.375	75
147	Andriy Isayev (UKR)	14.975	14.275	13.9	16.525	15.025		74.7
148	Marcel Nguyen (GER)	15		14.6	15.65	15.45	13.9	74.6
149	Robert Juckel (GER)	13.875	14.7	15.25	15.975		14.7	74.5
150	Dimitri Kaspiarovich (BLR)	15.025		15.075	16.275	15.075	13	74.45
151	Dimitri Karbanenko (FRA)	15	12.925		16.125	15.4	14.925	74.375
152	Robert Stănescu (ROU)	14.425	13.9	15.6	15.4	14.95		74.275
153	Youssef Jihad (MAR)	12.8	12.325	12.2	13.8	13.225	9.8	74.15
154	Pierre-Yves Bény (FRA)	14.775	14.45	15.225	14.575	15.1		74.125
155	Iván San Miguel (ESP)		13.975	15.3	15.425	14.325	14.8	73.825
156	Luke Carson (IRL)	12.85	11.975	10.4	14.45	13.15	10.775	73.6
157	Jad Mazahreh (JOR)	14.2	9.35	10.6	14.9	12.475	12.025	73.55
158	Evgeni Bogonosyuk (UKR)	15.575		13.325	15.825	14.65	13.875	73.25
159	Mohammad Omran Ali (KUW)	12.35	12.35	11.05	13.875	12.325	11.25	73.2
160	Arnaud Willig (FRA)	14.075	14.475	14.625	15.5		14.375	73.05
161	Nathan Gafuik (CAN)	15	13.95	13.6	16		14.225	72.775
162	Mosiah Rodrigues (BRA)	14.45	14.225		15.35	14.25	14.325	72.6
163	Danny Lawrence (GBR)	14.6		14.175	16.025	14.725	13.05	72.575
164	Manuel Carballo (ESP)	14.525	12.925	15.375		15.45	13.9	72.175
165	Igor Cassina (ITA)		14.275	14.075	14.025	14.675	15.1	72.15
166	Dennis Mannhart (SUI)	14.375	14.5	13.85		14.925	13.825	71.475
167	Alin Sandu Jivan (ROU)	14.025		15.1	15.325	14.8	12.175	71.425
168	Andrea Coppolino (ITA)	14.2	12.5	15.875	14.85	14		71.425
169	Ross Brewer (GBR)	13.7	14.175	14.65		14.85	13.825	71.2
170	Ali Al Asi (JOR)	13.5	7.875	11.625	15.575	12.425	10.025	71.025
171	Aleksandar Batinkov (BUL)	13.95		13.55	15.475	14.375	13.45	70.8
172	Luis Araujo (POR)	13.975		14	15.9	13.275	13.625	70.775
173	Filipe Bezugo (POR)	14.1	13.875	14		14.3	13.6	69.875
174	Yaroslav Vovk (BUL)		13.425	13.975	15	14.775	12.3	69.475
175	Eddie Penev (BUL)	14.425	12.225		15.5	13.725	13.3	69.175
176	Nashwan Alharazi (YEM)	14.1	12.925	10.725	15.5	12.55		65.8
177	Abdullah Abdul Reda (KUW)	13.55	12.375		13.9	12.1	12.2	64.125
178	Ken Ikeda (CAN)		14.6	2.95	15.575	14.95	14.1	62.175
179	Nikolai Kryukov (RUS)	0	14.75		16	16	14.975	61.725
180	Eugen Spiridonov (GER)	15	14.9		16.05	15.175		61.125
181	Huang Xu (CHN)		15.375	15.325		16.05	14.1	60.85
182	Brandon O'Neill (CAN)	15.525			16.15	15.675	13.3	60.65
183	Gervasio Deferr (ESP)	15.925			16.125	15	13.6	60.65
184	Isaac Botella Pérez (ESP)	15.575	13.725	15.3	15.975			60.575
185	Shun Kuwahara (JPN)		14.95	14.425		15.825	15.275	60.475
186	Makoto Okiguchi (JPN)	15.7	14.075	14.35	16.2			60.325
187	Kim Ji-Hoon (KOR)	14.85	15.325		15.65		14.2	60.025
188	Grant Golding (CAN)	15.05	14.15	15		15.525		59.725
189	Matteo Angioletti (ITA)	14.75		15.725	15.95		13.225	59.65
190	Louis Smith (GBR)		15.825		15.575	14.525	13.6	59.525
191	Aliaksandr Tsarevich (BLR)	14.475	15.025	0		15.7	14.25	59.45
192	Alberto Busnari (ITA)	13.875	15.3		15.025	14.575	58.775	
193	Kai Wen Tan (USA)		14.575	16.05		15.3	12.825	58.75
194	Michail Doulkeridis (GRE)	15.175		13.825	15.8		13.95	58.75
195	Yann Cucherat (FRA)		13.05	14.275		16.15	15.175	58.65
196	Luke Folwell (GBR)	14.45	14.275	14.2	15.65			58.575
197	Thomas Andergassen (GER)		13.975	15.375		15.025	13.95	58.325
198	Oleksandr Suprun (UKR)	15.3	14.125		14.925		13.95	58.3
199	Danilo Nogueira (BRA)		14.275	14.975		14.575	14.375	58.2
200	Jorge Portalanza Guerra (ECU)	13.05	9.225	11.45	13.225	0	11.225	58.175
201	Gustavo Simoes (POR)	14.2	13.95	14.525	15.05			57.725
202	Thomas Pichler (AUS)	15.075		13.375	15.6		13.575	57.625
203	Ildar Valeyev (KAZ)		14.125	14.35		15.45	13.675	57.6
204	Mark Ramseier (SUI)		12.825	14.975	14.775	14.95		57.525
205	Uladzimir Yermakov (BLR)	13.65	14.075	14.825	14.95	0		57.5
206	Vitali Kardashovs (LAT)	14.4		13.45	15.3		14.025	57.175
207	Anton Golotsutskov (RUS)	12.375	14.35	14.875	15.55		0	57.15
208	Bogomil Kuyumdzhiev (BUL)	14.275	13.15	14.175	15			56.6
209	Yang Tae-Seok (KOR)		14.3	13.8		13.725	14.625	56.45
210	Roman Gisi (SUI)	14.175	12.775		15.6		13.825	56.375
211	Xenofon Kosmidis (GRE)		14.2	13.725		14.7	13.6	56.225
212	Reinaldo Oquendo (PUR)	14.175	13.525	14.575		13.875		56.15
213	Ri Jong-Song (PRK)	14.075		14.575	15.825	11.55		56.025
214	Bernardo Graça (POR)		14.325		14.65	14.05	12.975	56
215	Mathew Curtis (AUS)	13.625	13.75		0	14.5	14	55.875
216	Maxim Petrishko (KAZ)	14.375	13.525			14.3	12.975	55.175
217	Aleksandar Markov] (BUL)		13.375	13.75		14.325	13.625	55.075
218	Anthony van Assche (NED)		13.425	14		14.025	13.15	54.6
219	Faisal Alothman (KUW)	14.175		11.975	14.775	12.475		53.4
220	Zou Kai (CHN)	16.275			15.725		14.875	46.875
221	Ri Se-Gwang (PRK)		14.675	15.825	16.225			46.725
222	Sean Golden (USA)	15.2		15.225	16			46.425
223	Prashanth Sellathurai (AUS)		15.2	15.375		14.5		45.075
224	Valeriy Goncharov (UKR)		14.575			15.975	14.4	44.95
225	Arthur Zanetti (BRA)	14.5		14.75	15.3			44.55
226	Vasileios Tsolakidis (GRE)	14.075	12.15		15.175	2.2		43.6
227	Tommy Ramos (PUR)			14.9		15.1	13.575	43.575
228	Stanislav Valiyev (KAZ)	14.1		13.3	16			43.4
229	Rafael Morales (PUR)	13.85	12.275		15.65			41.775
230	Mohammad Ramazanpour (IRI)	12.575	13.675		15.225			41.475
231	Sukdee Thitipong (THA)	0	14.425	13.425		12.9	0	40.75
232	Mohammad Mehdi Gaeini (IRI)	13.6			14.35		12	39.95
233	Carlo van Minde (NED)	14.225	10.95		14.625			39.8
234	Vitali Shnikers (LAT)		13.05			12.275	12.325	37.65
235	Yuri van Gelder (NED)			16.6	15.85			32.45
236	Aleksandr Safoshkin (RUS)			16.1		15.45		31.55
237	Minh Tuan Nguyen (VIE)			14.25	14.95			29.2
238	Cosmin Malita (ROU)		15.25				13.925	29.175
239	Alexei Ihnatovich (BLR)		15.5		0		13.575	29.075
240	Oscar Canas Figueroa (ESA)	12.95			13.6			26.55
241	Wayne Healy (IRL)				13.575	12.3		25.875
242	Mitja Petkovšek (SLO)					16.225		16.225
243	Regulo Carmona (VEN)			16.05				16.05
244	Krisztián Berki (HUN)		15.925					15.925
245	Aljaž Pegan (SLO)						15.45	15.45
246	Zhong Jian (HKG)			15.35				15.35
247	Robert Seligman (CRO)		15.1					15.1
248	Donna-Donny Truyens (BEL)		14.875					14.875
249	David Vyoral (CZE)	14.1						14.1
250	Ruslan Irgashev (UZB)					12.9		12.9
251	Marijo Možnik (CRO)						12.875	12.875
252	Raimonds Konchis (LAT)			12.325				12.325
253	Troy Maillis (BAH)	12.275						12.275

=== Team all-around ===
Rank	Team	Floor (gymnastics)	Pommel horse	Rings (gymnastics)	Vault (gymnastics)	Parallel bars	Horizontal bar	Total
1st place, gold medalist(s)	China	46.175 (2)	47.025 (1)	47.525 (1)	48.375 (2)	48.050 (1)	44.750 (3)	281.900
1st place, gold medalist(s)	Yang Wei		15.525	15.850	16.525	16.100		281.900
1st place, gold medalist(s)	Huang Xu		15.275	15.225		16.200	14.525	281.900
1st place, gold medalist(s)	Chen Yibing	15.150		16.450	15.825			281.900
1st place, gold medalist(s)	Xiao Qin		16.225				14.950	281.900
1st place, gold medalist(s)	Zou Kai	15.700					15.275	281.900
1st place, gold medalist(s)	Liang Fuliang	15.325			16.025			281.900
2nd place, silver medalist(s)	Japan	45.750 (6)	45.700 (2)	44.875 (6)	47.475 (6)	47.250 (3)	45.975 (1)	277.025
2nd place, silver medalist(s)	Hisashi Mizutori	15.425	15.125	14.450	15.525		15.625	277.025
2nd place, silver medalist(s)	Hiroyuki Tomita		15.500	15.675		16.025	15.550	277.025
2nd place, silver medalist(s)	Yosuke Hoshi		15.075		15.700	15.875	14.800	277.025
2nd place, silver medalist(s)	Makoto Okiguchi	15.250			16.250			277.025
2nd place, silver medalist(s)	Takuya Nakase	15.075		14.750				277.025
2nd place, silver medalist(s)	Shun Kuwahara					15.350		277.025
3rd place, bronze medalist(s)	Germany	45.975 (4)	44.000 (3)	44.450 (7)	47.925 (4)	46.150 (4)	45.025 (2)	273.525
3rd place, bronze medalist(s)	Fabian Hambüchen	15.650			16.175	15.575	16.125	273.525
3rd place, bronze medalist(s)	Eugen Spiridonov	15.250	14.600		15.775	15.125		273.525
3rd place, bronze medalist(s)	Robert Juckel		14.750	14.925	15.975		14.775	273.525
3rd place, bronze medalist(s)	Marcel Nguyen	15.075				15.450		273.525
3rd place, bronze medalist(s)	Thomas Andergassen		14.650	15.025				273.525
3rd place, bronze medalist(s)	Philipp Boy			14.500			14.125	273.525
4	United States	46.800 (1)	43.525 (6)	46.350 (2)	47.300 (7)	46.100 (5)	42.200 (6)	272.275
4	Jonathan Horton	15.625		15.150		15.400	14.875	272.275
4	Alexander Artemev		14.775		15.600	15.500	13.750	272.275
4	Sean Golden	15.575		15.375	16.100			272.275
4	Kai Wen Tan		14.525	15.825		15.200		272.275
4	Guillermo Alvarez	15.600			15.600			272.275
4	David Durante		14.225				13.575	272.275
5	South Korea	45.900 (5)	43.825 (4)	42.625 (8)	47.525 (5)	47.475 (2)	42.600 (5)	269.950
5	Yang Tae-Young	15.100	14.875	14.000	16.075	15.950	14.300	269.950
5	Yoo Won-chul			15.000	15.675	15.750		269.950
5	Kim Soo-Myun	15.375	14.650		15.775			269.950
5	Kim Dae-Eun	15.425		13.625		15.775		269.950
5	Kim Ji-Hoon		14.300				14.750	269.950
5	Yang Tae-Seok						13.550	269.950
6	Spain	46.100 (3)	43.500 (7)	45.200 (5)	48.050 (3)	44.500 (7)	42.050 (8)	269.400
6	Rafael Martínez	15.675	14.650			15.225	14.625	269.400
6	Gervasio Deferr	15.825			16.000	14.500		269.400
6	Isaac Botella Pérez	14.600		15.000	16.025			269.400
6	Sergio Muñoz		14.525		16.025		13.925	269.400
6	Manuel Carballo		14.325	15.050		14.775		269.400
6	Iván San Miguel			15.150			13.500	269.400
7	Russia	44.250 (8)	42.275 (8)	45.975 (3)	46.625 (8)	45.850 (6)	44.225 (4)	269.200
7	Yuri Ryazanov	14.150	13.100	14.700	15.775		14.700	269.200
7	Sergei Khorokhordin	14.975			15.525	15.350	14.875	269.200
7	Maksim Devyatovskiy	15.125	13.500	15.325	15.325			269.200
7	Nikolai Kryukov		15.675			15.900	14.650	269.200
7	Aleksandr Safoshkin			15.900		14.600		269.200
8	Romania	44.600 (7)	43.550 (5)	45.250 (4)	48.850 (1)	43.375 (8)	42.125 (7)	267.750
8	Răzvan Șelariu	15.200		14.950	16.025	15.125	14.150	267.750
8	Ilie Daniel Popescu	14.225	15.025	14.975	16.525	14.150		267.750
8	Flavius Koczi	15.175	14.625		16.300	14.100	14.300	267.750
8	Cosmin Malita		13.900				13.675	267.750
8	Robert Stănescu			15.325				267.750

=== All-around ===
Rank	Gymnast	Floor (gymnastics)	Pommel horse	Rings (gymnastics)	Vault (gymnastics)	Parallel bars	Horizontal bar	Total
1st place, gold medalist(s)	Yang Wei (CHN)	15.350	15.550	16.400	16.425	16.350	13.600	93.675
2nd place, silver medalist(s)	Fabian Hambüchen (GER)	15.475	14.225	14.350	16.300	15.800	16.050	92.200
3rd place, bronze medalist(s)	Hisashi Mizutori (JPN)	15.500	14.975	14.350	15.875	15.750	14.950	91.400
4	Jonathan Horton (USA)	15.625	13.975	15.250	16.075	15.450	14.825	91.200
5	Kim Dae-Eun (KOR)	15.800	14.500	14.575	15.875	16.050	14.250	91.050
6	Rafael Martínez (ESP)	15.800	14.825	14.825	15.750	15.300	14.525	91.025
7	Flavius Koczi (ROU)	15.275	15.275	14.550	16.475	15.025	14.275	90.875
8	Liang Fuliang (CHN)	15.850	14.575	14.550	16.025	15.525	14.325	90.850
8	Yang Tae-Young (KOR)	15.250	14.925	14.700	16.100	15.525	14.350	90.850
10	Razvan Selariu (ROU)	15.525	14.375	15.125	16.175	14.550	14.600	90.350
10	José Luis Fuentes (VEN)	14.600	15.325	15.075	15.525	15.300	14.525	90.350
12	Hiroyuki Tomita (JPN)	14.225	14.300	16.050	15.700	15.900	13.975	90.150
13	Yury Ryazanov (RUS)	14.400	14.625	15.075	15.900	15.400	14.475	89.875
14	Dmitri Savitski (BLR)	15.175	15.000	15.350	15.275	15.650	12.950	89.400
15	Enrico Pozzo (ITA)	15.400	14.325	14.150	15.800	14.725	14.975	89.375
16	Anton Fokin (UZB)	14.825	13.425	14.875	15.750	15.900	14.500	89.275
17	David Durante (USA)	13.700	14.750	14.875	15.725	15.300	14.475	88.825
18	Philipp Boy (GER)	14.900	14.525	14.875	14.775	15.025	14.550	88.650
19	Claudio Capelli (SUI)	14.775	14.175	14.425	16.125	14.925	13.800	88.225
20	David Kikuchi (CAN)	14.575	13.900	14.900	15.575	15.100	14.100	88.150
21	Vlasios Maras (GRE)	14.850	12.850	14.275	15.750	15.000	15.050	87.775
22	Filip Ude (CRO)	15.450	13.525	13.650	15.725	15.100	14.175	87.625
23	Casey Sandy (CAN)	14.700	13.725	14.475	15.650	15.125	13.700	87.375
24	Maxim Deviatovski (RUS)	15.275	14.925	15.525	16.100	3.725	–	65.550

=== Floor Exercise ===
Rank	Gymnast	A Score	B Score	Pen.	Total
1st place, gold medalist(s)	Diego Hypólito (BRA)	6.7	9.450		16.150
2nd place, silver medalist(s)	Gervasio Deferr (ESP)	6.5	9.450		15.950
3rd place, bronze medalist(s)	Hisashi Mizutori (JPN)	6.3	9.350		15.650
4	Guillermo Alvarez (USA)	6.3	9.300		15.600
5	Alexander Shatilov (ISR)	6.5	9.075		15.575
6	Zou Kai (CHN)	6.7	8.950	0.1	15.550
7	Liang Fuliang (CHN)	6.4	8.725		15.125
8	Makoto Okiguchi (JPN)	6.7	8.525	0.3	14.925

=== Pommel Horse ===
Rank	Gymnast	A Score	B Score	Pen.	Total
1st place, gold medalist(s)	Xiao Qin (CHN)	6.6	9.700		16.300
2nd place, silver medalist(s)	Krisztián Berki (HUN)	6.3	9.400		15.700
3rd place, bronze medalist(s)	Louis Smith (GBR)	6.5	9.100		15.600
4	Yang Wei (CHN)	6.2	9.275		15.475
5	Hiroyuki Tomita (JPN)	6.1	9.225		15.325
6	Alexander Artemev (USA)	5.7	9.475		15.175
7	Daniel Keatings (GBR)	6.5	8.250		14.750
8	Alexei Ihnatovich (BLR)	6.2	8.500		14.700

=== Rings ===
Rank	Gymnast	A Score	B Score	Pen.	Total
1st place, gold medalist(s)	Chen Yibing (CHN)	7.3	9.400		16.700
2nd place, silver medalist(s)	Yuri van Gelder (NED)	7.3	9.325		16.625
3rd place, bronze medalist(s)	Yordan Yovchev (BUL)	7.4	9.175		16.575
4	Kai Wen Tan (USA)	7.3	9.025		16.325
5	Regulo Carmona (VEN)	7.0	9.175		16.175
6	Yang Wei (CHN)	7.0	9.150		16.150
7	Aleksandr Safoshkin (RUS)	6.9	9.175		16.075
8	Hiroyuki Tomita (JPN)	6.9	9.025		15.925

=== Vault ===
Position	Gymnast	D Score	E Score	Penalty	Score 1	D Score	E Score	Penalty	Score 2	Total
1st place, gold medalist(s)	Leszek Blanik (POL)	7.0	9.450		16.450	7.0	9.575		16.575	16.512
2nd place, silver medalist(s)	Ilie Daniel Popescu (ROU)	7.0	9.675		16.675	7.0	9.325		16.325	16.500
3rd place, bronze medalist(s)	Ri Se-Gwang (PRK)	7.0	9.500		16.500	7.0	9.275		16.275	16.387
4	Ri Jong-Song (PRK)	7.0	9.200		15.600	7.0	9.525		16.525	16.362
5	Andriy Isayev (UKR)	7.0	9.075		16.075	7.0	9.425		16.425	16.250
6	Fabian Hambüchen (GER)	6.6	9.500		16.100	6.2	9.650		15.850	15.975
7	Flavius Koczi (ROU)	7.0	9.050		16.050	7.0	8.700	0.1	15.600	15.825
8	Isaac Botella Pérez (ESP)	6.6	8.375	0.1	14.875	6.6	9.300		15.900	15.387

=== Parallel Bars ===
Rank	Gymnast	A Score	B Score	Pen.	Total
1st place, gold medalist(s)	Mitja Petkovšek (SLO)	6.8	9.450		16.250
1st place, gold medalist(s)	Kim Dae-Eun (KOR)	6.8	9.450		16.250
3rd place, bronze medalist(s)	Anton Fokin (UZB)	6.7	9.500		16.200
4	Yoo Won-chul (KOR)	6.9	9.175		15.975
5	Huang Xu (CHN)	7.1	8.850		15.950
6	Yang Wei (CHN)	7.0	8.900		15.900
7	Yosuke Hoshi (JPN)	6.5	9.350		15.850
8	Yann Cucherat (FRA)	6.5	8.850		15.350

=== Horizontal Bar ===
Rank	Gymnast	A Score	B Score	Pen.	Total
1st place, gold medalist(s)	Fabian Hambüchen (GER)	7.0	9.250		16.250
2nd place, silver medalist(s)	Aljaž Pegan (SLO)	6.8	9.025		15.825
3rd place, bronze medalist(s)	Hisashi Mizutori (JPN)	6.8	8.975		15.775
4	Epke Zonderland (NED)	6.9	8.800		15.700
5	Jeffrey Wammes (NED)	6.4	8.750		15.150
5	Enrico Pozzo (ITA)	6.2	8.950		15.150
7	Vlasios Maras (GRE)	6.3	7.975		14.275
8	Hiroyuki Tomita (JPN)	5.8	7.500		13.300

== Women's results ==
=== Qualification ===
Oldest and youngest competitors

Women	Name	Country	Date of birth	Age
Youngest	Kim Da-eun	South Korea	28/12/92	14 years
Oldest	Oksana Chusovitina	Germany	19/06/75	32 years

Rank	Team	Vault (gymnastics)	Uneven bars	Balance beam	Floor (gymnastics)	Total
1	Steliana Nistor (ROU)	14.925	15.925	16.05	14.7	61.600 Q
2	Nastia Liukin (USA)	14.725	16.25	15.975	14.575	61.525 Q
3	Shawn Johnson (USA)	15.175	14.625	16.25	15.15	61.200 Q
4	Beth Tweddle (GBR)	14.525	16.075	14.925	15.25	60.775 Q
5	Vanessa Ferrari (ITA)	14.95	15.75	14.8	15.05	60.550 Q
6	Jade Barbosa (BRA)	15.95	15.25	15.6	13.725	60.525 Q
7	Sandra Izbașa (ROU)	14.575	14.775	15.85	15.15	60.350 Q
8	Shayla Worley (USA)	14.65	15	15.775	14.65	60.075
9	Yang Yilin (CHN)	14.475	16	14.9	14.325	59.700 Q
10	Hong Su-jong (PRK)	15.6	15.525	14.175	13.625	58.925 Q
11	Daria Joura (AUS)	15.075	14.65	14.25	14.475	58.450 Q
12	Xiao Sha (CHN)	14.35	14.975	14.65	14.45	58.425 Q
13	Yulia Lozhechko (RUS)	14.75	14.25	15.375	14.025	58.400 Q
14	Marie-Sophie Hindermann (GER)	14.75	15.75	13.575	14.25	58.325 Q
15	Ekaterina Kramarenko (RUS)	13.725	14.975	15.4	14.125	58.225 Q
16	Kristina Pravdina (RUS)	14.275	14.825	14.75	14.3	58.15
17	Anja Brinker (GER)	14.05	15.5	14.3	14.075	57.925 Q
18	Kōko Tsurumi (JPN)	13.775	14.85	15.175	14	57.800 Q
19	Alina Kozich (UKR)	14.65	14	14.35	14.725	57.725 Q
20	Federica Macrì (ITA)	14.775	14.2	14.25	14.35	57.575 Q
21	Valentyna Holenkova (UKR)	13.55	15.35	15.15	13.45	57.500 Q
22	Pauline Morel (FRA)	14.5	14.225	14.725	13.95	57.400 Q
23	Marine Petit (FRA)	14.5	14.2	14.275	14.35	57.325 Q
24	Svetlana Klyukina (RUS)	14.65	15.075	15.075	12.4	57.2
25	Ariella Käslin (SUI)	14.225	14.675	15.275	12.75	56.925 Q
26	Jana Komrsková (CZE)	14.3	14.3	14.875	13.45	56.925 Q
27	Lenika de Simone (ESP)	13.65	14.9	14.125	14.1	56.775 Q
28	Hong Un-jong (PRK)	14.8	14.25	13.925	13.8	56.775 R
29	Katja Abel (GER)	14.45	13.9	14.4	13.975	56.725
30	Dariya Zgoba (UKR)	13.425	15.525	14.75	12.925	56.625
31	Lichelle Wong (NED)	13.825	14.25	14.7	13.675	56.450 R
32	Monica Bergamelli (ITA)	13.825	14.075	14.725	13.825	56.45
33	Kristýna Pálešová (CZE)	13.925	15.375	13.85	13.225	56.375 R
34	Alyssa Brown (CAN)	14.6	14.025	14.425	13.125	56.175 R
35	Verona van de Leur (NED)	14.925	12.95	14.3	13.975	56.15
36	Keiko Mukumoto (JPN)	14.225	14.625	13.65	13.65	56.15
37	Lauren Mitchell (AUS)	13.45	12.9	15.45	14.3	56.1
38	Kristina Vaculik (CAN)	14.075	13.375	14.525	14.025	56
39	Daniele Hypólito (BRA)	13.7	13.825	14.375	14.075	55.975
40	Laura Campos (ESP)	13.8	13.375	14.75	14.025	55.95
41	Miki Uemura (JPN)	13.65	14.2	14.9	13.15	55.9
42	Stefani Bismpikou (GRE)	13.425	14.1	15.025	13.3	55.85
43	Sydney Sawa (CAN)	14.1	13.85	14.1	13.725	55.775
44	Mercedes Alcaide (ESP)	13.7	14.175	13.775	14.075	55.725
45	Nastassia Marachkouskaya (BLR)	14.4	12.65	14.65	13.925	55.625
46	Veronica Wagner (SWE)	14.1	13.45	14.375	13.675	55.6
47	Shona Morgan (AUS)	13.575	14.675	15.05	12.2	55.5
48	Andreea Grigore (ROU)	13.95	13.4	14.2	13.95	55.5
49	Mélodie Pulgarín (ESP)	14.05	14.125	13.85	13.425	55.45
50	Elyse Hopfner-Hibbs (CAN)	14.05	13.125	15.25	13	55.425
51	Dorina Böczögő (HUN)	13.6	14	14.2	13.35	55.15
52	Hannah Clowes (GBR)	14.325	13.625	13.325	13.825	55.1
53	Jana Šikulová (CZE)	13.55	15.1	13.3	12.95	54.9
54	Nicole Pechancová (CZE)	12.775	14.675	14.45	12.925	54.825
55	Danielle Englert (SUI)	13.325	14.975	12.925	13.375	54.6
56	Anne Tritten (NED)	13.775	14.3	13.625	12.625	54.325
57	Kim Myong-bok (PRK)	14.1	14.425	13.1	12.575	54.2
58	Nathalia Sánchez (COL)	12.925	13.85	13.875	12.975	53.625
59	Jessica Gil Ortiz (COL)	14.375	12.7	13.4	13	53.475
60	Viktoria Tsakalidou (GRE)	13.7	13.125	13.925	12.725	53.475
61	Marisela Cantú (MEX)	13.625	13.325	12.95	13.45	53.35
62	Jo Hyun-joo (KOR)	13.65	13.175	13.825	12.625	53.275
63	Marta Pihan (POL)	12.85	13.4	13.875	13.125	53.25
64	Evgenia Zafeiraki (GRE)	13.85	13.125	13.275	12.975	53.225
65	Yeny Ibarra (MEX)	13.825	13.2	13.05	13.15	53.225
66	Bibiana Vélez (COL)	13.925	13.825	12.725	12.725	53.2
67	Paula Plichta (POL)	13.675	13.3	13.5	12.675	53.15
68	Gaelle Mys (BEL)	13.65	13.175	13.625	12.7	53.15
69	Tina Erceg (CRO)	13.35	13.3	13	13.5	53.15
70	Aagje Vanwalleghem (BEL)	14.075	13.775	12.8	12.45	53.1
71	Laura Gombás (HUN)	13.475	12.575	13.4	13.575	53.025
72	Yu Han-sol (KOR)	13.025	13.025	13.875	13	52.925
73	Petra Witjes (NED)	13.55	13.875	12.725	12.7	52.85
74	Elsa García (MEX)	14.225	14.05	13.425	11.075	52.775
75	Annamari Maaranen (FIN)	13.475	13.075	13.7	12.45	52.7
76	Yessenia Estrada (MEX)	14.325	12.725	12.725	12.775	52.55
77	Ericka García (MEX)	13.65	13.3	12.775	12.725	52.45
78	Jessica López (VEN)	12.85	13.7	11.975	13.75	52.275
79	Nikolina Tankoucheva (BUL)	13.2	12.75	13.075	13.2	52.225
80	Yasmin Zimmermann (SUI)	13.675	12.525	13.175	12.825	52.2
81	Enikő Korcsmáros (HUN)	13.725	12.65	13.15	12.675	52.2
82	Ivet Rojas (VEN)	13.5	12.1	13.55	12.925	52.075
83	Vered Finkel (ISR)	13.375	12.525	12.925	13.05	51.875
84	Jelena Zanevskaja (LTU)	13.1	13.6	12.775	12.325	51.8
85	Ivana Kováčová (SVK)	13.275	13.225	13.475	11.8	51.775
86	Adela Šajn (SLO)	12.8	12.15	13.55	13.275	51.775
87	Luiza Galiulina (UZB)	12.75	12.325	14.475	12.225	51.775
88	Dinah Nagel (AUT)	13.225	12.1	13.1	13.275	51.7
89	Sidney Sanabria (PUR)	13.25	12.25	13.525	12.575	51.6
90	Frida Einarsdóttir (ISL)	13.475	11.975	13.175	12.925	51.55
91	Sherine El-Zeiny (EGY)	13.5	11.125	13.5	13.225	51.35
92	Joanna Litewka (POL)	13.95	11.875	12.825	12.7	51.35
93	Aino Aura (FIN)	13.075	12.175	13.25	12.825	51.325
94	Florencia Salomon (ARG)	13.325	11.5	13.425	13	51.25
95	Katrin Nussbacher (AUT)	12.825	12.5	12.675	13.05	51.05
96	Park Eun-kyung (KOR)	12.275	12.975	13.375	12.175	50.8
97	Zoi Lima (POR)	13.575	12.225	12.775	12.225	50.8
98	Mária Homolová (SVK)	12.3	12.65	13.25	12.4	50.6
99	Ursula Botha (RSA)	12.85	12.15	12.775	12.725	50.5
100	Natalia Paulíčková (SVK)	13.825	10.95	13.525	12.05	50.35
101	Xi Hui Tay (SIN)	13.175	12.35	13.5	11.25	50.275
102	Jia Hui Tay (SIN)	13.3	11.875	12.825	12.175	50.175
103	Aksana Novikava (BLR)	11.55	12.925	13.125	12.475	50.075
104	Tal Liak (ISR)	13.65	12.675	11.075	12.475	49.875
105	Stefanie Van Meerbeeck (BEL)	12.85	11.175	13.45	12.35	49.825
106	Jekaterina Appel (EST)	13.25	12.075	11.975	12.375	49.675
107	Catarina Martins (POR)	13.225	10.95	12.75	12.675	49.6
108	Linn Nilsson (SWE)	12.8	12.9	11.4	12.375	49.475
109	Simona Castro (CHI)	13.5	10.45	12.725	12.75	49.425
110	Đỗ Thị Ngân Thương (VIE)	12.35	11.925	12.6	12.525	49.4
111	Annika Urvikko (FIN)	13.325	11.5	12.675	11.7	49.2
112	Andrea Rührlinger (AUT)	12.925	11.7	11.925	12.55	49.1
113	Volha Shakots (BLR)	13.075	10.85	13	12.125	49.05
114	Phan Thị Hà Thanh (VIE)	13.125	10.475	13.675	11.7	48.975
115	Rita Oliveira (POR)	12.65	11.925	12.55	11.85	48.975
116	Heem Wei Lim (SIN)	13.15	11.8	12.375	11.6	48.925
117	Celeste Carnevale (ARG)	12.85	11.3	12.375	12.325	48.85
118	Johanny Sotillo (VEN)	12.8	12.45	11.025	12.55	48.825
119	Han Byul (KOR)	12.525	11.275	13.35	11.65	48.8
120	Jekaterina Kovaliova (LTU)	12.4	11.425	12.6	12.375	48.8
121	Candice Cronje (RSA)	13.275	11.45	12.3	11.775	48.8
122	Kathrine Hansson (NOR)	12.9	12.175	11.55	12.125	48.75
123	Silviya Georgieva (BUL)	12.925	11.325	12.2	12.125	48.575
124	Katarzyna Jurkowska (POL)	12.875	11.025	11.85	12.75	48.5
125	Julie Hansson (NOR)	13.175	12.775	11.25	11.125	48.325
126	Chiang Pi-Hsuan (TPE)	12.825	10.625	12.85	11.9	48.2
127	Kristjana Ólafsdóttir (ISL)	13.45	10.175	13.1	11.45	48.175
128	Carmen Horvat (SLO)	13.225	9.025	13.525	12.3	48.075
129	Emrina Abduvalieva (UZB)	12.925	11.3	11.4	12.35	47.975
130	Natthakan Khanchai (THA)	13.475	10.775	12.55	11.05	47.85
131	Karina Tapalova (KAZ)	12.725	10.825	11.925	12.125	47.6
132	Yevgeniya Gorbunova (KAZ)	13.35	10.5	11.5	12.05	47.4
133	Maja Petrova (BUL)	12.15	10.5	11.925	12.625	47.2
134	Mette Hulgaard (DEN)	12.375	11.425	11.4	12	47.2
135	Leysha López (PUR)	13.475	11.575	12.65	9.425	47.125
136	Lyubov Gnusenkova (UZB)	12.2	11.575	12.425	10.925	47.125
137	Kalina Todorova (BUL)	12.7	11.075	11.225	12.075	47.075
138	Heba Moustafa Abdelnaby (EGY)	12.975	9.775	12.2	12.05	47
139	Alicia Sacramone (USA)	15.7		15.8	15.275	46.775
140	Cheng Fei (CHN)	15.95		15.3	15.375	46.625
141	Rinette Whelpton (RSA)	12.175	9.875	12.95	11.35	46.35
142	Sema Aslan (TUR)	12.3	11.85	10.1	11.6	45.85
143	Cătălina Ponor (ROU)	14.825		16.25	14.3	45.375
144	Chen Chun-Min (TPE)	12.525	9.475	11.9	11.375	45.275
145	Irina Raimbekova (KGZ)	12.325	8.375	12.775	11.575	45.05
146	Becky Downie (GBR)	14.875	15.5	14.6		44.975
147	Jiang Yuyuan (CHN)	14.7	15.375		14.75	44.825
148	Ramona Beukes (NAM)	12.35	10.45	11.775	10.175	44.75
149	Isabelle Severino (FRA)	14.575		15.45	14.425	44.45
150	Samantha Peszek (USA)	15.05	14.875		14.5	44.425
151	Sandra Ostad (NOR)	12.85	10.9	10.75	9.825	44.325
152	Katheleen Lindor (FRA)	14.675	14.8	14.8		44.275
153	Francesca Benolli (ITA)	15.05	14.975	13.95		43.975
154	Lia Parolari (ITA)		14.975	14.4	14.525	43.9
155	Hollie Dykes (AUS)	14.3	14.5	14.875		43.675
156	Laís Souza (BRA)	14.45	14.225	14.975		43.65
157	Oksana Chusovitina (GER)	15.7	13.55	14.275	0	43.525
158	Cassy Véricel (FRA)	14.45	14.125		14.9	43.475
159	Daniela Druncea (ROU)	14.8	14.175		14.475	43.45
160	He Ning (CHN)	13.8	14.6	15.025		43.425
161	Rebecca Wing (GBR)	14.35	13.975	14.4	0	42.725
162	Li Shanshan (CHN)		11.775	16.325	14.625	42.725
163	Khiuani Dias (BRA)	14.55		14.225	13.95	42.725
164	Diana Bludova (LTU)	11.55	9.7	10.55	10.75	42.55
165	Daiane dos Santos (BRA)	14.35	13.775		14.35	42.475
166	Aisling Williams (GBR)		14.7	14.2	13.5	42.4
167	Olga Sherbatykh (UKR)	14.375		14.275	13.675	42.325
168	Maryna Proskurina (UKR)	14.525	13.525	14.175		42.225
169	Joeline Möbius (GER)	14.1		13.75	14.225	42.075
170	Chloe Sims (AUS)	14.35	13.75		13.85	41.95
171	Lucia Tacchelli (SUI)	13.8	14.675		13.15	41.625
172	Kyoko Oshima (JPN)	13.25	14.575		13.7	41.525
173	Momoko Ozawa (JPN)	13.175		14.65	13.225	41.05
174	Marrit Ewald (NED)	13.65	14.125		13.075	40.85
175	Kim Un-hyang (PRK)		13.825	13.3	13.5	40.625
176	Vasiliki Millousi (GRE)		13.875	14.25	12.45	40.575
177	Laëtitia Dugain (FRA)		14.35	12.475	13.675	40.5
178	Ana Cláudia Silva (BRA)		13.65	12.225	14.325	40.2
179	Kimberly-Ann Van Zyl (NAM)	12.875	4.925	11.275	10.7	39.775
180	Kang Yong-mi (PRK)	13.25		12.975	13.5	39.725
181	Sylvia Hitz (SUI)	13.075		13.05	12.925	39.05
182	Viktoria Makshtarova (BLR)	12.525	12.05	13.6		38.175
183	Anna Orfanou (GRE)	13.55		11.9	12.675	38.125
184	Martina Castro (CHI)	13.1		13.075	11.625	37.8
185	Kang Ji-na (KOR)	12.55	11.4	12.95		36.9
186	Sara Szczawińska (POL)	13		11.225	12.325	36.55
187	Iliana Sheytanova (BUL)		12.5	10.775	11.55	34.825
188	Aljazy Al-Habshi (QAT)	12.35	0	10.9	10.725	33.675
189	Irina Sirutz (BLR)		10.925	12.15	10.5	33.575
190	Ksenia Semenova (RUS)		16.325	15.3		31.625
191	Mayu Kuroda (JPN)		15.4	14.525		29.925
192	Elena Zamolodchikova (RUS)	15.1			14.425	29.525
193	Ivana Hong (USA)		14.8	14.325		29.125
194	Cerasela Pătrașcu (ROU)		14.225	14.875		29.1
195	Anastasia Koval (UKR)		15.5		13.575	29.075
196	Cha Yong-hwa (PRK)	13.425	15.525			28.95
197	Marci Bernholtz (CAN)		14.275	14.375		28.65
198	Marissa King (GBR)	14.4			13.925	28.325
199	Nansy Damianova (CAN)	14.525			13.7	28.225
200	Naomi Ruíz (ESP)	14.4			13.625	28.025
201	Ashleigh Brennan (AUS)			14.05	13.725	27.775
202	Vasiliki Georgakopoulou (GRE)	13.5	14.125			27.625
203	Martina Strnadová (CZE)	13.375	13.575			26.95
204	Karyna Tsimerbayeva (BLR)	13.125			12.15	25.275
205	Eva Verbová (CZE)			12.85	12.075	24.925
206	Laura Alzina (SUI)		10.85	13.55		24.4
207	Hiu Ying Angel Wong (HKG)	13.5		10.8		24.3
208	Sanne Wevers (NED)			13.8		13.8
209	Jenny Brunner (GER)		13.725			13.725
210	Patricia Moreno (ESP)			13.575		13.575
211	Silvia Zanolo (ITA)				13.525	13.525
212	Kim Da-eun (KOR)		11.775			11.775
213	Monika Frandofert (POL)		11.325			11.325
214	Saša Golob (SLO)		9.65			9.65

=== Team all-around ===
Rank	Team	Vault (gymnastics)	Uneven bars	Balance beam	Floor (gymnastics)	Total
1st place, gold medalist(s)	United States	45.950 (1)	47.325 (1)	45.800 (4)	45.325 (1)	184.400
1st place, gold medalist(s)	Shawn Johnson	15.150	15.375	15.025	15.375	184.400
1st place, gold medalist(s)	Alicia Sacramone	15.750		15.600	15.325	184.400
1st place, gold medalist(s)	Nastia Liukin		16.375	15.175		184.400
1st place, gold medalist(s)	Shayla Worley		15.575		14.625	184.400
1st place, gold medalist(s)	Samantha Peszek	15.050				184.400
1st place, gold medalist(s)	Ivana Hong					184.400
2nd place, silver medalist(s)	China	44.375 (5)	46.650 (2)	48.150 (1)	44.275 (2)	183.450
2nd place, silver medalist(s)	Cheng Fei	15.025		15.850	15.425	183.450
2nd place, silver medalist(s)	Jiang Yuyuan	14.925	15.550		15.025	183.450
2nd place, silver medalist(s)	Yang Yilin	14.425	15.825			183.450
2nd place, silver medalist(s)	Li Shanshan			16.275	13.825	183.450
2nd place, silver medalist(s)	Xiao Sha			16.025		183.450
2nd place, silver medalist(s)	He Ning		15.275			183.450
3rd place, bronze medalist(s)	Romania	44.825 (4)	44.175 (5)	45.850 (3)	43.250 (3)	178.100
3rd place, bronze medalist(s)	Steliana Nistor	14.975	15.900	14.800	13.950	178.100
3rd place, bronze medalist(s)	Sandra Izbașa		13.525	15.425	14.925	178.100
3rd place, bronze medalist(s)	Cătălina Ponor	15.000		15.625		178.100
3rd place, bronze medalist(s)	Daniela Druncea	14.850			14.375	178.100
3rd place, bronze medalist(s)	Cerasela Pătrașcu		14.750			178.100
3rd place, bronze medalist(s)	Andreea Grigore					178.100
4	Italy	44.950 (3)	44.575 (4)	43.425 (6)	42.500 (7)	175.450
4	Lia Parolari		15.275	14.675	14.475	175.450
4	Federica Macrì	14.800		14.225	14.125	175.450
4	Vanessa Ferrari	15.100	14.775			175.450
4	Francesca Benolli	15.050	14.525			175.450
4	Monica Bergamelli			14.525		175.450
4	Silvia Zanolo				13.900	175.450
5	Brazil	45.000 (2)	42.650 (7)	44.850 (5)	42.625 (6)	175.125
5	Jade Barbosa	15.925	15.000	15.625	14.675	175.125
5	Laís Souza	14.500	14.525	14.750		175.125
5	Khiuani Dias	14.575	13.125			175.125
5	Daniele Hypólito			14.475		175.125
5	Ana Cláudia Silva				14.025	175.125
5	Daiane dos Santos				13.925	175.125
6	France	43.900 (6)	43.150 (6)	43.325 (7)	43.225 (4)	173.600
6	Katheleen Lindor	14.725	14.550	14.225		173.600
6	Marine Petit	14.625		13.675	14.075	173.600
6	Isabelle Severino			15.425	14.525	173.600
6	Pauline Morel	14.550	14.275			173.600
6	Cassy Véricel				14.625	173.600
6	Laëtitia Dugain		14.325			173.600
7	United Kingdom	43.825 (7)	42.575 (8)	42.225 (8)	40.550 (8)	169.175
7	Rebecca Downie	14.900	15.125	14.625		169.175
7	Marissa King	14.700		13.675	14.100	169.175
7	Hannah Clowes	14.225		13.925	13.775	169.175
7	Aisling Williams		13.275		12.675	169.175
7	Rebecca Wing		14.175			169.175
7	Elizabeth Tweddle					169.175
8	Russia	28.850 (8)	46.175 (3)	46.450 (2)	43.050 (5)	164.525
8	Ksenia Semenova		16.325	15.675		164.525
8	Svetlana Klyukina		15.000	15.025		164.525
8	Yulia Lozhechko	13.875		15.750		164.525
8	Elena Zamolodchikova	14.975			14.350	164.525
8	Ekaterina Kramarenko	0.000	14.850		14.375	164.525
8	Kristina Pravdina				14.325	164.525

==== Vault incident ====
During the team finals, Russian team member Ekaterina Kramarenko balked on her vault attempt as a result of being off-step. To avoid injury, she did not perform her vault and slowed down before she hit the apparatus, stepping onto the springboard and touching the vault table. Thinking she would be able to perform another vault, Kramarenko walked back down the runway but was escorted off the floor. The judges immediately gave her a score of "0", which was counted as one of three scores for the team's vaulting apparatus. This score was assigned in observation of section 8.1 of the WAG Code of Points, which states that a gymnast is not allowed a second attempt if she has touched the springboard or vault itself in any way on her first attempt, and with which coaches and gymnasts are expected to be familiar.

The Russian team petitioned that Kramarenko's qualification score of 13.725 be able to carry over as a mock-compulsory score, but were refused. In another petition to have Russian team members Yulia Lozhechko and Elena Zamolodchikova's vaulting scores averaged and then counted, Russia was again refused. When asked to comment on the incident, Russian coach Andrei Rodionenko explained, "Nobody knows what happened, it was a shock for everyone."

Any team that scratched on vault would have immediately finished last in the competition, whether it be in first or last rotation.

=== All-around ===
Position	Gymnast	Vault (gymnastics)	Uneven bars	Balance beam	Floor (gymnastics)	Total
1st place, gold medalist(s)	Shawn Johnson (USA)	15.175	15.375	15.900	15.425	61.875
2nd place, silver medalist(s)	Steliana Nistor (ROU)	14.875	15.225	15.550	14.975	60.625
3rd place, bronze medalist(s)	Jade Barbosa (BRA)	15.900	14.950	15.700	14.000	60.550
3rd place, bronze medalist(s)	Vanessa Ferrari (ITA)	15.125	14.475	15.650	15.300	60.550
5	Nastia Liukin (USA)	14.750	16.100	14.575	14.675	60.100
6	Yang Yilin (CHN)	14.700	15.575	15.075	14.675	60.025
7	Xiao Sha (CHN)	14.625	14.975	15.650	14.350	59.600
8	Yulia Lozhechko (RUS)	14.700	14.150	15.625	14.775	59.250
9	Sandra Izbașa (ROU)	14.650	14.075	15.325	15.175	59.225
10	Daria Joura (AUS)	15.175	14.400	14.350	14.875	58.800
11	Elizabeth Tweddle (GBR)	14.575	15.925	13.375	14.850	58.725
12	Hong Su-jong (PRK)	15.550	14.750	14.200	13.825	58.325
13	Ekaterina Kramarenko (RUS)	14.025	15.450	14.025	14.350	57.850
14	Marie-Sophie Hindermann (GER)	14.675	15.800	13.200	14.125	57.800
15	Koko Tsurumi (JPN)	13.875	15.050	15.000	13.600	57.525
16	Marine Petit (FRA)	14.550	14.175	14.275	14.300	57.300
17	Lenika De Simone (ESP)	13.975	14.625	14.600	13.950	57.150
18	Anja Brinker (GER)	14.125	15.600	13.475	13.350	56.550
19	Federica Macrì (ITA)	14.800	13.925	13.475	14.150	56.350
20	Kristýna Pálešová (CZE)	14.200	14.675	14.625	12.750	56.250
21	Pauline Morel (FRA)	13.875	13.950	14.125	14.100	56.050
22	Ariella Käslin (SUI)	14.325	14.525	12.825	13.700	55.375
23	Hong Un-jong (PRK)	15.100	14.225	13.150	12.725	55.200
24	Valentina Holenkova (UKR)	13.500	13.600	14.550	13.500	55.150

=== Vault ===
Position	Gymnast	D Score	E Score	Penalty	Score 1	D Score	E Score	Penalty	Score 2	Total
1st place, gold medalist(s)	Cheng Fei (CHN)	6.5	9.500		16.000	6.5	9.375		15.875	15.937
2nd place, silver medalist(s)	Hong Su-jong (PRK)	6.5	9.350		15.850	6.5	9.275		15.775	15.812
3rd place, bronze medalist(s)	Alicia Sacramone (USA)	6.3	9.450		15.750	5.8	9.275		15.075	15.412
4	Hong Un-jong (PRK)	5.8	9.200		15.000	6.5	8.900		15.400	15.200
5	Jade Barbosa (BRA)	6.5	9.125		15.625	5.6	9.100		14.700	15.162
6	Oksana Chusovitina (GER)	6.3	8.125		14.425	5.7	9.250		14.950	14.687
7	Jana Komrsková (CZE)	5.2	9.250		14.450	5.0	9.375		14.375	14.412
8	Elena Zamolodchikova (RUS)	5.8	9.200		15.000	5.2	7.850	0.3	12.750	13.875

=== Uneven Bars ===
Rank	Gymnast	A Score	B Score	Pen.	Total
1st place, gold medalist(s)	Ksenia Semenova (RUS)	7.2	9.150		16.350
2nd place, silver medalist(s)	Nastia Liukin (USA)	7.1	9.200		16.300
3rd place, bronze medalist(s)	Yang Yilin (CHN)	7.0	9.150		16.150
4	Elizabeth Tweddle (GBR)	6.9	9.225		16.125
5	Marie-Sophie Hindermann (GER)	6.8	9.075		15.875
6	Steliana Nistor (ROU)	6.7	9.100		15.800
7	Hong Su-jong (PRK)	6.6	9.050		15.650
8	Vanessa Ferrari (ITA)	6.7	8.000		14.700

=== Balance Beam ===
Rank	Gymnast	A Score	B Score	Pen.	Total
1st place, gold medalist(s)	Nastia Liukin (USA)	6.6	9.425		16.025
2nd place, silver medalist(s)	Steliana Nistor (ROU)	6.7	9.200		15.900
2nd place, silver medalist(s)	Li Shanshan (CHN)	7.3	8.600		15.900
4	Cătălina Ponor (ROU)	6.6	9.200	0.1	15.700
5	Lauren Mitchell (AUS)	6.6	8.825		15.425
6	Isabelle Severino (FRA)	5.8	8.875		14.675
7	Jade Barbosa (BRA)	6.3	8.275		14.575
8	Shawn Johnson (USA)	6.8	7.675		14.475

=== Floor Exercise ===
Rank	Gymnast	A Score	B Score	Pen.	Total
1st place, gold medalist(s)	Shawn Johnson (USA)	6.2	9.150	0.1	15.250
2nd place, silver medalist(s)	Alicia Sacramone (USA)	6.1	9.125		15.225
3rd place, bronze medalist(s)	Cassy Véricel (FRA)	6.2	8.925		15.125
4	Jiang Yuyuan (CHN)	6.2	8.900		15.100
5	Cheng Fei (CHN)	6.5	8.875	0.3	15.075
6	Vanessa Ferrari (ITA)	6.3	8.750		15.050
7	Elizabeth Tweddle (GBR)	6.3	8.600		14.900
8	Sandra Izbașa (ROU)	6.0	9.025	0.5	14.525

== Medal count ==
=== Overall ===
Rank	Nation	Gold	Silver	Bronze	Total
1	China	5	2	1	8
2	United States	4	2	1	7
3	Germany	1	1	1	3
4	Slovenia	1	1	0	2
5	Brazil	1	0	1	2
6	Poland	1	0	0	1
6	Russia	1	0	0	1
6	South Korea	1	0	0	1
9	Romania	0	3	1	4
10	Japan	0	1	3	4
11	North Korea	0	1	1	2
12	Hungary	0	1	0	1
12	Netherlands	0	1	0	1
12	Spain	0	1	0	1
15	Bulgaria	0	0	1	1
15	France	0	0	1	1
15	Great Britain	0	0	1	1
15	Italy	0	0	1	1
15	Uzbekistan	0	0	1	1
Totals (19 entries)		15	14	14	43

=== Men ===
Rank	Nation	Gold	Silver	Bronze	Total
1	China	4	0	0	4
2	Germany	1	1	1	3
3	Slovenia	1	1	0	2
4	Brazil	1	0	0	1
4	Poland	1	0	0	1
4	South Korea	1	0	0	1
7	Japan	0	1	3	4
8	Hungary	0	1	0	1
8	Netherlands	0	1	0	1
8	Romania	0	1	0	1
8	Spain	0	1	0	1
12	Bulgaria	0	0	1	1
12	Great Britain	0	0	1	1
12	North Korea	0	0	1	1
12	Uzbekistan	0	0	1	1
Totals (15 entries)		9	7	8	24

=== Women ===
Rank	Nation	Gold	Silver	Bronze	Total
1	United States	4	2	1	7
2	China	1	2	1	4
3	Russia	1	0	0	1
4	Romania	0	2	1	3
5	North Korea	0	1	0	1
6	Brazil	0	0	1	1
6	France	0	0	1	1
6	Italy	0	0	1	1
Totals (8 entries)		6	7	6	19
