= Li Shanshan (gymnast) =

Chinese artistic gymnast

- Born: 22 February 1992 (age 34) Huangshi, Hubei, China
- Height: 1.45 m (4 ft 9 in)

Gymnastics career
- Discipline: Women's artistic gymnastics
- Country represented: China
- Club: Guangdong
- Retired: 2009
Medal record
Representing China
Olympic Games
Gold medal – first place	2008 Beijing	Team
World Championships
Silver medal – second place	2007 Stuttgart	Team
Silver medal – second place	2007 Stuttgart	Balance beam
World Cup Final
Bronze medal – third place	2008 Madrid	Balance beam

Li Shanshan (Chinese: 李珊珊; pinyin: Lǐ Shānshān; born 22 February 1992) is a Chinese former artistic gymnast. She won a gold medal with the Chinese team at the 2008 Summer Olympics. At the 2007 World Championships, she won silver medals in the team event and on the balance beam. She is also the 2008 World Cup Final balance beam bronze medalist.

== Gymnastics career ==
Li won a gold medal with the Guangdong provincial team at the 2005 National Games of China. At the 2006 Pacific Rim Championships, she won a bronze medal with the junior Chinese team. In the event finals, she won another bronze medal on the balance beam, behind Xiao Sha and Shawn Johnson, and she also placed seventh on the uneven bars.

Li finished sixth in the all-around final at the 2007 Chinese Championships. In the event finals, she won the balance beam title by over a full point with the highest difficulty score of the competition, and she also won a silver medal on the floor exercise. She was then selected to compete at the 2007 World Championships, where the Chinese team won the silver medal behind the United States after Li fell on the floor exercise. She also won the silver medal on the balance beam, despite falling during a full spin, because of her high difficulty score.

Li won a silver medal on the balance beam at the 2008 Cottbus World Cup. Then at the Barcelona World Cup, she won gold medals on both the balance beam and floor exercise. She was selected to represent China at the 2008 Summer Olympics alongside Cheng Fei, Deng Linlin, He Kexin, Jiang Yuyuan, and Yang Yilin. Li contributed on the balance beam in the team final to help China win its first-ever Olympic team gold medal in women's artistic gymnastics. In qualifications for the balance beam event final, she placed first. However, during the event final, she fell on a full-twisting Korbut flip and placed sixth.

After the Olympic Games, Li competed at the 2008 World Cup Final, where she won a bronze medal on the balance beam, behind Lauren Mitchell and Yulia Lozhechko. At the 2009 Chinese Championships, Li won a silver medal on the balance beam. She announced her retirement from the sport after the 2009 National Games. She participated in the 2010 Asian Games torch relay.
