= Gymnastics at the 2007 European Youth Summer Olympic Festival =

- Venue: Belgrade Fair
- Location: (Serbia) Belgrade
- Dates: 22–27 July 2007

Gymnastics at the 2007 European Youth Summer Olympic Festival (EYOF) was held from 22 to 27 July 2007. The competitions took place at the Belgrade Fair in Belgrade, Serbia. At the artistic gymnastics events 107 female juniors participated, representing 39 different European countries, including 32 complete teams (3 gymnasts).

== Medal summary ==
=== Medal table ===
==== Overall ====
Rank	Nation	Gold	Silver	Bronze	Total
1	Ukraine	4	1	0	5
2	Romania	1	1	3	5
3	Germany	1	0	1	2
4	France	0	1	1	2
5	Italy	0	1	0	1
5	Netherlands	0	1	0	1
5	Russia	0	1	0	1
8	Spain	0	0	1	1
Totals (8 entries)		6	6	6	18

=== Medal events ===
==== Girls ====
Event	Gold	Silver	Bronze
Team all-around	Ukraine; Valentyna Holenkova; Anastasia Koval; Valeriya Savelyeva	Netherlands; Wyomi Masela; Anne Tritten; Marrit Ewald	Romania; Cerasela Patrascu; Andreea Acatrinei; Gabriela Drăgoi
Individual all-around	Valentyna Holenkova; Ukraine	Cerasela Patrascu; Romania	Andreea Acatrinei; Romania
Vault	Cerasela Patrascu; Romania	Ekaterina Kurbatova; Russia	Youna Dufournet; France
Uneven bars	Valentyna Holenkova; Ukraine	Youna Dufournet; France	Joeline Möbius; Germany
Balance beam	Valentyna Holenkova; Ukraine	Elisabetta Preziosa; Italy	Cerasela Patrascu; Romania
Floor	Joeline Möbius; Germany	Valentyna Holenkova; Ukraine	Ana Maria Izurieta; Spain

== See also ==
- European Youth Olympic Festival
