= Cerasela Pătrașcu =

Romanian artistic gymnast

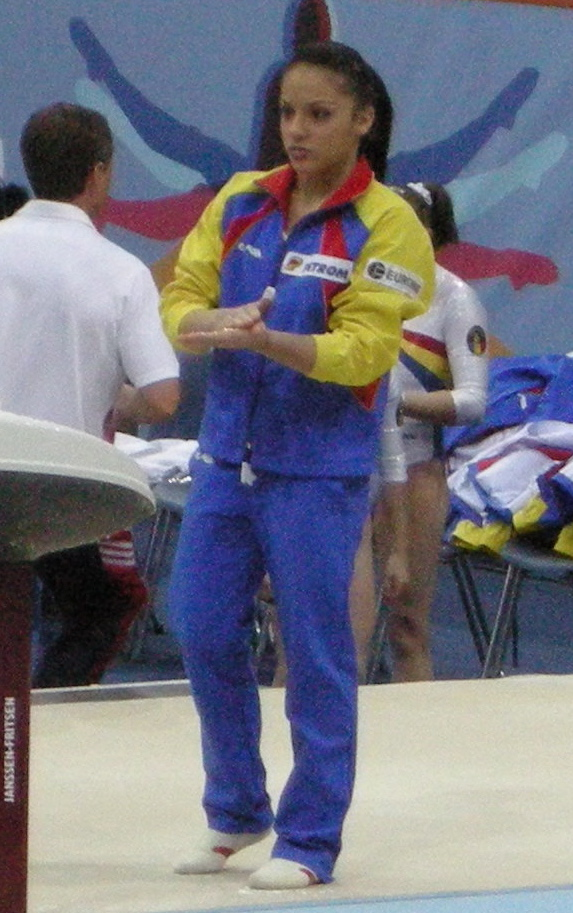

Personal information
- Full name: Cerasela Ștefania Pătrașcu
- Born: 23 December 1992 (age 33) Balș

Gymnastics career
- Discipline: Women's artistic gymnastics
- Country represented: Romania
- Club: CSS Cetate Deva
- Head coaches: Marian Bitang, Octavian Belu
- Assistant coaches: Liliana Cozma, Lucian Sandu
- Former coach: Nicolae Forminte
- Choreographer: Puia Valer
- Retired: 2010
Medal record
World Championships
Bronze medal – third place	2007 Stuttgart	Team
European Championships
Gold medal – first place	2008 Clermont Ferrand	Team
European Youth Olympic Festival
Gold medal – first place	2007 Belgrade	Vault
Silver medal – second place	2007 Belgrade	All-around
Bronze medal – third place	2007 Belgrade	Team
Bronze medal – third place	2007 Belgrade	Balance beam

Cerasela Pătrașcu (born 23 December 1992 in Balș, Olt County, Romania) is a Romanian artistic gymnast. She is a bronze world medalist and a gold European medalist with the team.

== Early life and gymnastic career ==
Cerasela was a member of the national team at Deva and had a successful junior career medaling at various competitions. She was a silver medalist with the team at the 2006 Junior European Championships. In 2007, she won the 7th Lugano International Trophy and medaled gold on vault, silver for all around and bronze on balance beam at the European Youth Olympic Festival.

== Senior career ==
=== 2007-2008 ===
Her first major senior competition was the 2007 World Championships. Here she helped the team to qualify in the third place by competing on uneven bars and beam. In the team finals she contributed to the team bronze medal by competing on uneven bars (14.750). She was also a team member at the 2008 European Championships. In the team qualifications she competed on vault (14.650) and on uneven bars (14.475) but she suffered a leg injury dismounting from bars and did not compete in the finals. She underwent knee surgery with the hope that she will make it in the Olympic team. She had a short comeback and competed in the Romanian Nationals, Romanian Open and in a three-country meet (Romania, France, Germany) without doing difficult tumbling and dismounts. However, she did not manage to make a full recovery and she needed a second knee surgery.

=== 2009-2010 ===
After being sidelined for more than a year she made a second comeback at the Romanian Nationals in September 2009. Here she competed only on beam and uneven bars. In the beginning of 2010 she participated with her team at two friendly meets in Great Britain and in France where she competed on beam, uneven bars and vault. In April she was a member of the Romanian team at the European Championships but she did not compete. Later that year she traveled with her team at a friendly meet in Great Britain. Here she won gold in balance beam and with the team and placed fourth on vault and sixth on uneven bars. In October she went with the national team in Rotterdam to compete at the 2010 World Championships. Here she helped her team qualify in the fourth place by competing on balance beam, vault and uneven bars, although she did not compete in the team final.

== Post-retirement ==
She retired after the 2010 World Championships due to health problems.

== Skills ==
Cerasela is a gymnast with gracious lines and "beautiful flexibility". A picture of her performing on the balance beam was on the cover of March 2009 International Gymnast Magazine that celebrated the range of motion and unusual gymnastics flexibility.
