= Annamari =

Annamari is a feminine given name. Notable people with the name include:

- Annamari Dancha (born 1990), Ukrainian snowboarder
- Annamari Dancs (born 1981), Romanian-Hungarian singer
- Annamari Maaranen (born 1986), Finnish artistic gymnast
