= Batinkov =

Batinkov (Bulgarian: Батинков) is a Bulgarian surname. Notable people with the surname include:

- Aleksandar Batinkov (born 1985), Bulgarian gymnast
- Slavcho Batinkov (born 1969), Bulgarian skier
