= 2008 FIG Artistic Gymnastics World Cup final =

International gymnastics competition

The 2008 Artistic Gymnastics World Cup Final was held in Madrid, Spain in December 2008. This was the last Artistic Gymnastics World Cup in which a Final event was held.

== Medal summary ==
Event	Gold	Silver	Bronze	Ref.
Men's floor exercise	(Brazil) Diego Hypólito	(Japan) Kōhei Uchimura	(Israel) Alexander Shatilov	
Men's pommel horse	(China) Zhang Hongtao	(Hungary) Krisztián Berki	(Australia) Prashanth Sellathurai	
Men's still rings	(Ukraine) Oleksandr Vorobyov	(Bulgaria) Yordan Yovchev	(Netherlands) Yuri van Gelder	
Men's vault	(France) Thomas Bouhail	(Netherlands) Jeffrey Wammes	(Spain) Isaac Botella (Russia) Anton Golotsutskov	
Men's parallel bars	(France) Yann Cucherat (China) Feng Zhe	None awarded	(Ukraine) Valeriy Honcharov	
Men's horizontal bar	(Netherlands) Epke Zonderland	(Australia) Philippe Rizzo	(Japan) Hiroyuki Tomita	
Women's vault	(China) Cheng Fei	(Switzerland) Ariella Kaeslin	(Belgium) Aagje Vanwalleghem	
Women's uneven bars	(China) He Kexin	(China) Jiang Yuyuan	(Japan) Kōko Tsurumi	
Women's balance beam	(Australia) Lauren Mitchell	(Russia) Yulia Lozhechko	(China) Li Shanshan	
Women's floor exercise	(China) Cheng Fei	(China) Jiang Yuyuan	(Romania) Sandra Izbașa	

== Women's results ==
=== Uneven bars ===
Rank	Gymnast	A Score	B Score	Pen.	Total
1st place, gold medalist(s)	He Kexin (CHN)	7.700	8.500		16.250
2nd place, silver medalist(s)	Jiang Yuyan (CHN)	7.100	8.600		15.700
3rd place, bronze medalist(s)	Koko Tsurumi (JPN)	6.800	8.450		15.250
4	Dariya Zgoba (UKR)	6.200	8.400	0.1	14.500
5	Jana Šikulová (CZE)	6.000	8.300		14.300
6	Anastasia Koval (UKR)	6.000	7.625		13.625
7	Daniele Hypólito (BRA)	5.500	6.675	0.3	11.875
	Yang Yilin (CHN)	-	-	-	-

=== Balance beam ===
Rank	Gymnast	A Score	B Score	Pen.	Total
1st place, gold medalist(s)	Lauren Mitchell (AUS)	6.600	8.650		15.250
2nd place, silver medalist(s)	Yulia Lozhechko (RUS)	6.400	8.800		15.200
3rd place, bronze medalist(s)	Li Shanshan (CHN)	6.300	8.850		15.150
4	Sandra Izbaşa (ROU)	5.900	9.025		14.925
5	Dariya Zgoba (UKR)	5.300	8.700		14.000
6	Cheng Fei (CHN)	6.400	7.525	0.1	13.825
7	Daniele Hypólito (BRA)	6.100	7.325		13.425

=== Floor exercise ===
Rank	Gymnast	A Score	B Score	Pen.	Total
1st place, gold medalist(s)	Cheng Fei (CHN)	6.300	9.075		15.375
2nd place, silver medalist(s)	Jiang Yuyan (CHN)	6.300	8.925		15.225
3rd place, bronze medalist(s)	Sandra Izbaşa (ROU)	6.200	8.800		15.000
4	Elena Zamolodchikova (RUS)	5.700	8.375		14.075
5	Naomi Ruiz Walker (ESP)	5.800	8.100		13.900
6	Daniele Hypólito (BRA)	5.300	8.400		13.700
7	Koko Tsurumi (JPN)	5.700	7.875		13.575
8	Elsa García (MEX)	6.100	7.475	0.4	13.175
9	Suzanne Harmes (NED)	5.300	7.450	0.1	12.650

== See also ==
- List of medalists at the FIG World Cup Final
