= Aagje Vanwalleghem =

Belgian artistic gymnast

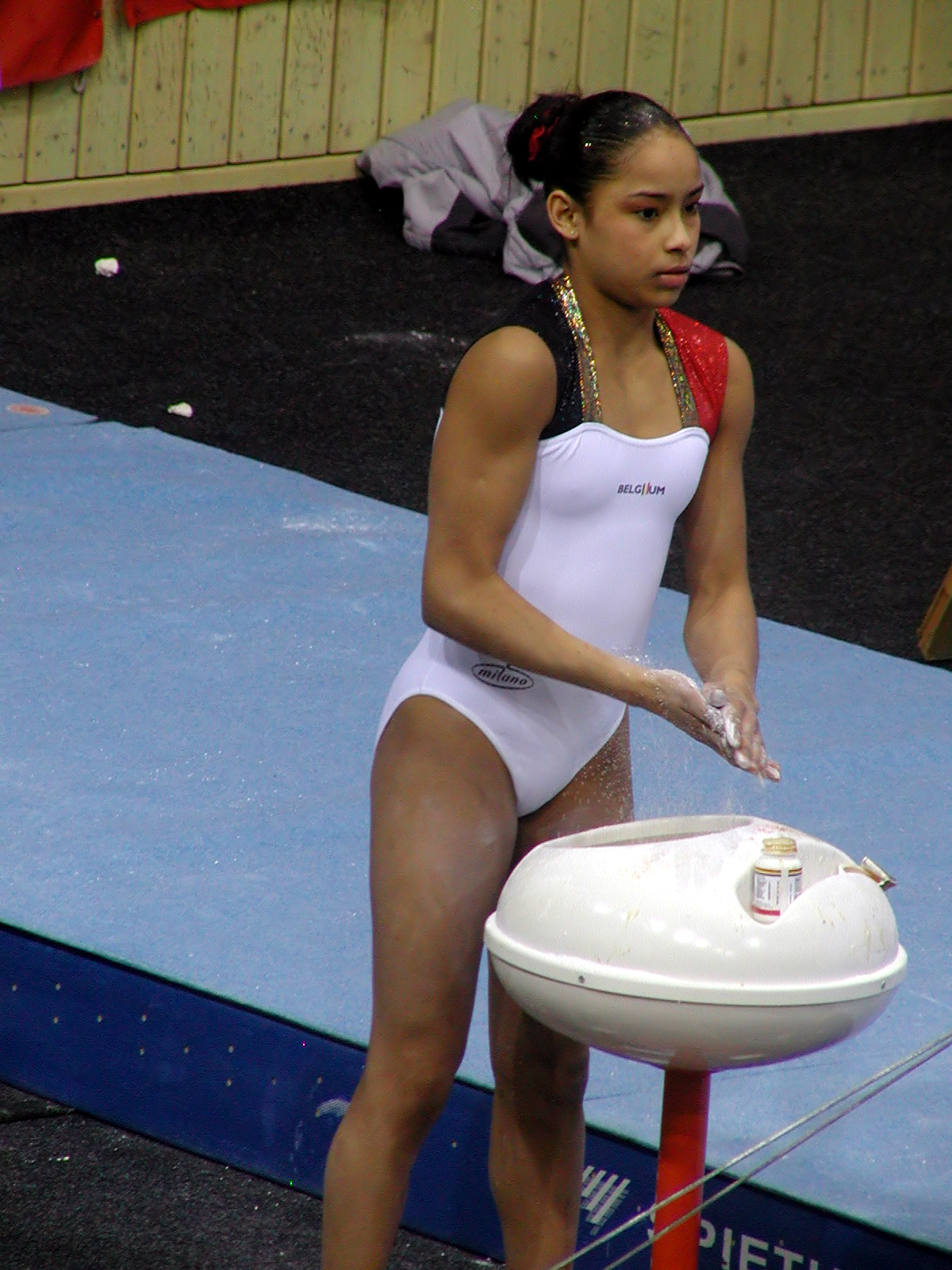
- Aagje Vanwalleghem in 2004

Personal information
- Full name: Aagje Vanwalleghem (formerly Ana Maria Pereira da Silva)
- Born: 24 October 1987 (age 39) Poção de Pedras, Brazil

Gymnastics career
- Discipline: Artistic gymnastics
- Country represented: Belgium
- Retired: 2012
Medal record
World Cup Final
Bronze medal – third place	2008 Madrid	Vault
European Championships
Bronze medal – third place	2005 Debrecen	Vault

Aagje Vanwalleghem (born 24 October 1987 in Poção de Pedras, Brazil) is a former Belgian gymnast.

Vanwalleghem competed in the 2004 Olympic games and has taken part in numerous other international competitions.

== Early life ==
Born in north-eastern Brazil, Aagje Vanwalleghem was gravely ill when, at the age of four months, she was adopted by a Belgian teacher. She was originally named Ana Maria Pereira da Silva.

At the age of seven Aagje made contact with her Brazilian family. In her Belgian family, which lived at Wevelgem in West Flanders, she grew up with two sisters, Lieke and Auke, who were born in Ethiopia and were also adopted. As Aagje reached the age of 18, three more Ethiopian girls were adopted, Aster, Ele and June.

As a child she became involved in gymnastics and for some years trained locally in Wevelgem with Hilde Masselis.

== Gymnastics career ==
In 1999 Vanwalleghem took advantage of a new programme for talented gymnasts and began to train with the Dutch coach Gerrit Beltman in North Holland. The following year she and Beltman moved to Ghent.

Vanwalleghem's first success at senior international level came in 2003 when she qualified for the all-around final at the world championships.

In 2004, she represented Belgium at the Athens Olympics, qualifying for the all-round final, which was the best result a Belgian gymnast had ever achieved at the time. Back home she was voted the most promising Belgian youngster of the year.

In 2005, she again won a World Cup bronze medal in the vault, this time in Paris. Also in 2005 she took a bronze medal in the vault at the European Championships in Debrecen. She was the first Belgian to win a medal at this level.

Further success in the World Cup came in 2008, with silver medals in the vault in Stuttgart and in Ostrava and on the uneven bars in Ostrava. In the World Cup final in Madrid Vanwalleghem won a bronze medal in the vault. However, the same year she underwent three operations on her right knee and failed to qualify for the Beijing Olympics.

Success returned in 2009 with World Cup silver medals in the vault and on the uneven bars at Cottbus. At the European Championships she ended in sixth place in the all-around final, and in fourth place in the vault final.

2011 saw her at the European Championships in Berlin, where she reached the final on the uneven bars and also the all-round final. She ended up sixth in the bars final and fourteenth in the allround final.

In January 2012 she was a member of the team which came 5th in the Olympic Test Event in London.

== Retirement ==
In early 2012 it was expected that Vanwalleghem would represent Belgium at the London Olympic Games later in the year. However, on 28 March 2012 she announced that she was retiring from gymnastics with immediate effect, saying that she could no longer cope both physically and mentally.

== Personal life ==
In 2016 Vanwalleghem married former pole-vaulter Denis Goossens.
