= Valentyna Holenkova =

Ukrainian artistic gymnast (born 1992)

- Full name: Valentyna Mykhailivna Holenkova
- Born: 7 May 1992 (age 34) Kirovohrad, Ukraine
- Height: 150 cm (4 ft 11 in)

Gymnastics career
- Discipline: Women's artistic gymnastics
- Country represented: Ukraine
- Club: Dynamo Kirvohrad
Medal record
Representing Ukraine
Women's Gymnastics
Universiade
Silver medal – second place	2011 Shenzhen	Team competition
European Youth Olympic Festival
Gold medal – first place	2007 Belgrade	Team competition
Gold medal – first place	2007 Belgrade	All-around
Gold medal – first place	2007 Belgrade	Uneven bars
Gold medal – first place	2007 Belgrade	Balance beam
Silver medal – second place	2007 Belgrade	Floor exercise

Valentyna Holenkova (born 7 May 1992) is a Ukrainian gymnast. She participated in the 2008 Olympic Games in Beijing, where her best result was finishing 37th in the women's individual all-around prelims.

== See also ==
- List of Olympic female gymnasts for Ukraine
