= Naomi Ruiz Walker =

Spanish female artistic gymnast (born 1992)

- Born: January 31, 1992 (age 34) Alcúdia, Mallorca, Spain

Gymnastics career
- Discipline: Women's artistic gymnastics
- Country represented: Spain (2007-2009)

Naomi Ruiz Walker (born 31 January 1992) is a Spanish female artistic gymnast who represented her nation at international competitions. She participated at the 2007 World Artistic Gymnastics Championships, and 2008 Artistic Gymnastics World Cup Final.
