= Joeline Möbius =

German gymnast

Joeline Moebius
- Born: 26 August 1992 (age 34)

Gymnastics career
- Discipline: Women's artistic gymnastics
- Country represented: Germany (2007-2010)
Medal record
Women's Gymnastics
Representing Germany
European Youth Olympic Festival
Gold medal – first place	2007 Belgrade	Floor exercise
Bronze medal – third place	2007 Belgrade	Uneven bars

Joeline Möbius (born 26 August 1992) is a German female artistic gymnast, representing her nation at international competitions.

She participated at the 2008 Summer Olympics in Beijing, China. She also competed at world championships, including the 2007 and 2010 World Artistic Gymnastics Championships in Rotterdam.
