= Gymnastics at the 2008 Summer Olympics – Women's balance beam =

Women's balance beam at the Games of the XXIX Olympiad
- Venue: Beijing National Indoor Stadium
- Dates: August 19
- Competitors: 8 from 5 nations

Medalists
1st place, gold medalist(s)		Shawn Johnson	United States
2nd place, silver medalist(s)		Nastia Liukin	United States
3rd place, bronze medalist(s)		Cheng Fei	China

Women's balance beam competition at the 2008 Summer Olympics was held on August 19 at the Beijing National Indoor Stadium.

The eight competitors (with a maximum of two per nation) with the highest scores in qualifying proceeded to the women's balance beam finals. There, each gymnast performed again; the scores from the final round (ignoring qualification) determined final ranking.

== Medalists ==
Gold	Silver	Bronze
Shawn Johnson (USA)	Nastia Liukin (USA)	Cheng Fei (CHN)

== Final ==
Position	Gymnast	Country	A score	B score	Penalty	Total
Gold medal	Shawn Johnson	United States	7.000	9.225		16.225
Silver medal	Nastia Liukin	United States	6.600	9.425		16.025
Bronze medal	Cheng Fei	China	6.800	9.150		15.950
4	Anna Pavlova	Russia	6.800	9.100		15.900
5	Gabriela Drăgoi	Romania	6.500	9.125		15.625
6	Li Shanshan	China	7.000	8.300		15.300
7	Ksenia Afanasyeva	Russia	5.800	9.025		14.825
8	Koko Tsurumi	Japan	6.300	8.150		14.450

== Qualified competitors ==
Position	Gymnast	A score	B score	Penalty	Total
1	Li Shanshan (CHN)	7.000	9.125		16.125
2	Nastia Liukin (USA)	6.600	9.375		15.975
3	Shawn Johnson (USA)	6.900	9.075		15.975
4	Cheng Fei (CHN)	6.700	9.275	0.100	15.875
5	Anna Pavlova (RUS)	6.700	9.125		15.825
6	Ksenia Afanasyeva (RUS)	6.600	9.175		15.775
7	Gabriela Drăgoi (ROU)	6.500	8.950		15.450
8	Koko Tsurumi (JPN)	6.500	8.925		15.425

Only two gymnasts per country may advance to an event final. The following gymnasts scored high enough to qualify, but did not do so because two gymnasts from their country had already qualified ahead of them:

- Alicia Sacramone (USA) (4th place)
- Ksenia Semenova (RUS) (8th place)
- Deng Linlin (CHN) (9th place)
- Bridget Sloan (USA) (10th place)
- Yang Yilin (CHN) (11th place)

The eventual final qualifier had the 13th highest balance beam score overall during qualification.
