= Xiao Sha =

Chinese gymnast

Personal information
- Full name: 肖莎 (Xiao Sha)
- Born: 15 June 1992 (age 34) Rongjiang, Guizhou
- Height: 140 cm (4 ft 7 in)

Gymnastics career
- Discipline: Women's artistic gymnastics
- Country represented: China
- Retired: 2009
Medal record
World Championships
Silver medal – second place	2007 Stuttgart	Team
Pacific Rim Championships
Bronze medal – third place	2006 Honolulu	Team

Xiao Sha (Chinese: 肖莎; pinyin: Xiāo Shā, born 15 June 1992) is a retired Chinese gymnast. She won a silver medal with the Chinese team at the 2007 World Championships.

== Gymnastics career ==
Xiao Sha started training in gymnastics at age 6. She medaled at the Chinese national championships, including gold for all-round in 2006, silver for all-round in 2007, gold for balance beam in 2008 and gold for all-round and balance beam in 2009. She was also the leading gymnast for the Guizhou team, competing on all four apparatus in the team events. At the 11th Chinese national games in 2009, Xiao came 7th in all-round, 8th on balance beam and 5th on floor, while the Guizhou team she led came 7th.

At the international level, Xiao was part of the Chinese team at the 2007 World Championships, where China won silver. She came 7th in the all-round final. In 2008, she won gold on balance beam and bronze on floor at the Cottbus World Cup, and repeated those results at the Ostrava World Cup later that year.

She announced her retirement in December 2009.

== Routines ==
- Bars-Clear hip, Ray, Ling, Piked Jaeger, Pak salto, Toe on shoot to HB, Healy, Straddled Jaeger, Double layout full
- Beam-Front aerial to the side of the beam, two flics to a layout, full turn with leg at horizontal, front aerial to flic to layout step-out, front tuck, split jump, sheep jump, back tuck, switch ring, switch split, round off, double pike back.
- Floor- Piked full twisting double back, 1 1/2 twist to front full, switch split, switch split 1/2, Memmel, 2 1/2 twist, double turn w/ leg at horizontal, double pike back

== Competitive history ==
Year	Competition Description	Location	Apparatus	Rank-Final	Score-Final	Rank-Qualifying	Score-Qualifying
2007	World Championships	Stuttgart	Team	2	183.450	2	241.175
2007	World Championships	Stuttgart	All-Round	7	59.600	12	58.425
2008	World Cup	Cottbus	Balance Beam	1	16.125	4	14.925
2008	World Cup	Cottbus	Floor Exercise	3	14.500	3	14.275
2008	World Cup	Tianjin	Balance Beam	4	15.425	1	16.300
2008	World Cup	Ostrava	Uneven Bars	7	12.200	4	13.650
2008	World Cup	Ostrava	Balance Beam	1	15.650	1	16.000
2008	World Cup	Ostrava	Floor Exercise	3	13.850	4	12.850
