= Annamari Maaranen =

Finnish artistic gymnast (born 1986)

- Full name: Annamari Maaranen
- Born: 24 October 1986 (age 39) Tampere, Finland

Gymnastics career
- Country represented: Finland
- College team: Denver Pioneers

Annamari Maaranen (born 24 October 1986) is a retired artistic gymnast from Finland. Maaranen was the national all-around champion for Finland in 2005 and 2006.

At the 2007 World Championships, she qualified to represent Finland at the 2008 Olympic Games in Beijing, the first female Finnish gymnast in 44 years to qualify to the Olympic Games. However, she was unable to compete in Beijing because of a knee injury suffered in January 2008.

She attended the University of Denver, where she competed for the gymnastics team. She was a graduate student at Springfield College, where she planned to be the head coach for the women's club team for 2016–2017. She is a Doctor of Psychology working for United States Air Force, has published two papers about psychology of gymnastics.

== Eponymous skill ==
Maaranen has one eponymous skill listed in the Code of Points.

Apparatus	Name	Description	Difficulty (Note: Valid for the 2025-2028 Code of Points)
Uneven bars	Maaranen	Jump with extended body to handstand on low bar also with 1/1 turn (360°) in handstand phase	D
