= Ivana Kováčová =

Slovak artistic gymnast (born 1992)

- Born: February 24, 1992 (age 34) Bratislava, Czechoslovakia

Gymnastics career
- Discipline: Women's artistic gymnastics
- Country represented: Slovakia (2008-2009)

Ivana Kováčová (born 24 February 1992) is a former Slovak female artistic gymnast and member of the national team.

She participated at the 2008 Summer Olympics. She also competed at world championships, including the 2009 World Artistic Gymnastics Championships in London, Great Britain.
