= Poção de Pedras =

Coordinates: 4°45′S 44°56′W

- Municipality
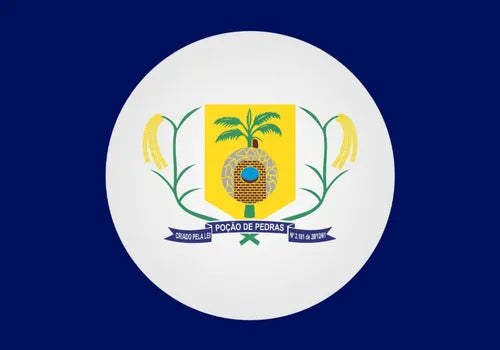
- Flag
- Interactive map of Poção de Pedras
- Country: Brazil
- Region: Nordeste
- State: Maranhão
- Mesoregion: Centro Maranhense

Population (2020)
  - Total: 17,595
- Time zone: UTC−3 (BRT)

Poção de Pedras is a municipality in the state of Maranhão in the Northeast region of Brazil.

== See also ==
- List of municipalities in Maranhão
