= Aleksandar Batinkov =

Bulgarian artistic gymnast (born 1985)

- Born: 4 December 1985 (age 40)

Gymnastics career
- Discipline: Men's artistic gymnastics
- Country represented: Bulgaria (2007–present)

Aleksandar Batinkov (Bulgarian: Александър Батинков) (born 4 December 1985) is a Bulgarian male artistic gymnast, representing his nation at international competitions. He participated at the 2015 European Games in Baku. He also competed at world championships, including the 2007 World Artistic Gymnastics Championships in Stuttgart, Germany.
