= Jiang Yuyuan =

Chinese gymnast (born 1991)

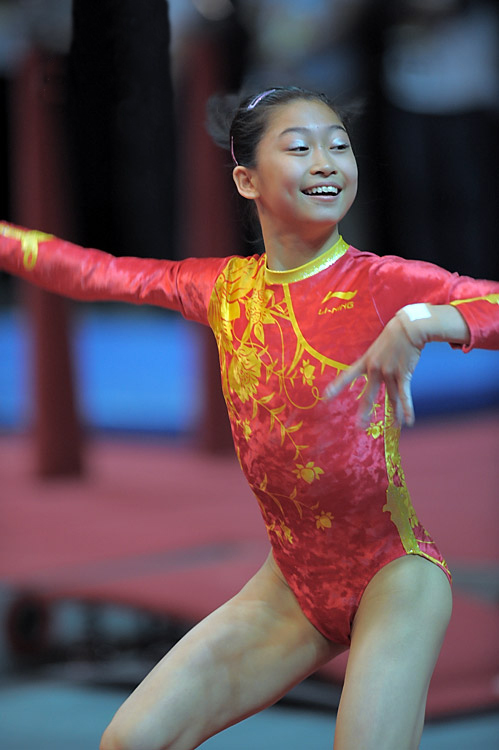
- Jiang performing her floor exercise at a show in Hong Kong

Personal information
- Nickname: Yuanyuan
- Born: Liuzhou, Guangxi
- Height: 148 cm (4 ft 10 in)

Gymnastics career
- Discipline: Women's artistic gymnastics
- Country represented: China; (2006–13 (CHN))
- Club: National team
- Head coach: Xiong Jingbin
- Assistant coach: Zhang Xia
- Music: "Lift Your Veil"
- Retired: October 2013
Medal record
Representing China
Olympic Games
Gold medal – first place	2008 Beijing	Team
World Championships
Silver medal – second place	2007 Stuttgart	Team
Silver medal – second place	2010 Rotterdam	All-Around
Bronze medal – third place	2010 Rotterdam	Team
Bronze medal – third place	2011 Tokyo	Team
World Cup Final
Silver medal – second place	2008 Madrid	Uneven Bars
Silver medal – second place	2008 Madrid	Floor Exercise
World Cup
Gold medal – first place	2007 Shanghai	Uneven Bars
Gold medal – first place	2007 Shanghai	Floor Exercise
Gold medal – first place	2008 Doha	Floor Exercise
Gold medal – first place	2008 Ostrava	Uneven Bars
Gold medal – first place	2008 Ostrava	Floor Exercise
Silver medal – second place	2008 Doha	Uneven Bars
Silver medal – second place	2008 Ostrava	Balance Beam
Silver medal – second place	2012 Doha	Uneven Bars
Bronze medal – third place	2007 Shanghai	Vault
Bronze medal – third place	2012 Doha	Floor Exercise
Asian Games
Gold medal – first place	2010 Guangzhou	Team
Summer Universiade
Gold medal – first place	2009 Belgrade	Team
Gold medal – first place	2009 Belgrade	All-Around
Gold medal – first place	2009 Belgrade	Balance Beam
Silver medal – second place	2009 Belgrade	Uneven Bars
Silver medal – second place	2009 Belgrade	Floor Exercise

Jiang Yuyuan (also Yuyan; simplified Chinese: 江钰源; traditional Chinese: 江鈺源; pinyin: Jiāng Yùyuán; born in Liuzhou, Guangxi) is a retired Chinese gymnast. She is the 2008 Chinese all-around senior national champion and a member of the gold medal-winning People's Republic of China team for the 2008 Summer Olympics. Jiang was a member of the silver medal-winning Chinese team at the 2007 World Championships, the bronze medal-winning member at the 2010 World Championships and 2011 World Championships, and the all-around gold medalist at the 2007 Good Luck Beijing Olympic test event. In 2010, she replaced Cheng Fei as the captain of the Chinese national team (due to Fei's leg injury). She won a silver medal in the all-around competition at the 2010 World Championships, which is the highest position that a Chinese woman has ever placed in the all-around competition at a world or Olympic championship.

== Personal life ==
Jiang Yuyuan is a Hakka born in Liuzhou, Guangxi with ancestry from Yunan, Guangdong. Her father is a taxi driver, and her mother is unemployed with no regular income. Jiang's family was under a lot of financial pressure when she was little.

Her hobbies include photography, digital gadgets, cars, fashion and cosmetics. She also likes listening to English songs. Team members Cheng Fei and Yang Yilin said that Jiang was responsible for teaching other female members of the national team about make-up techniques.

Jiang said in one of her interviews that she is sometimes "a little bit of a rebel". Her head coach in the Chinese national team, Lu Shanzhen, agreed that she would become rebellious occasionally and said that Jiang had the "most character" among the female gymnasts in the national team. Jiang's idol is her fellow gymnast Cheng Fei.

Jiang and her teammate, Deng Linlin, appeared in the official Olympics documentary 筑梦2008 (Dream Weavers 2008), which followed the gymnasts from 2003 until Jiang's international debut at the 2007 World Championships.

== Gymnastics career ==
Li Ning's cousin was Jiang's neighbour when she was little. After noticing that Jiang was very energetic, he suggested to her parents that they sign her up for gymnastics lessons. Her parents took his suggestion, and so Jiang was enrolled in gymnastics classes by the time she was four. She was selected by the Guangxi Provincial Team to participate in a three-month training camp, but her parents received a call from the Provincial Team asking them to bring Jiang home less than two months after the training began. Her coach at that time insisted that Jiang had talent and persuaded her parents to leave her under her care to train Jiang personally. However, it would be a dead end for a Chinese gymnast's career to not join the Provincial Team, so when the opportunity came, she transferred from Guangxi to join the Zhejiang Provincial Team.

Jiang won the 2002 Provincial Gymnastics Championships for the Zhejiang Provincial Team by winning the all-around competition and, in so doing, caught the attention of the National Team coaches. Soon thereafter, in 2003, she joined the National Training Camp for a stint before it was forced to disband due to the outbreak of the disease SARS. Jiang joined the National Team 2 in 2004, and she was selected from a list of 300 hopefuls from Team 2 to join the National Team 1 in 2006.

She made her senior international debut in 2007 as a member of the Chinese team that won the silver medal in the team competition at the 2007 World Gymnastics Championships. At the same competition, she placed 4th on floor exercise in the individual event finals. In November 2007, she won the all-around at the Good Luck Beijing Olympic Test Event.

At the 2008 Beijing Olympics, Jiang helped the Chinese team to win the team gold medal at the Olympics. Individually, she finished in 6th place in the all-around competition and finished 4th place in the floor exercise event final. Jiang competed at the Olympics with an elbow injury, specifically periosteum inflammation. Her coach disclosed that the injury greatly affected her performance at the Olympics, particularly on vault, where pain prevented her from successfully executing her 2.5-twisting Yurchenko (Amanar), which was crucial for her success in the individual all-around final. As a result of the injury, Chinese coach Lu Shanzhen also decided to pull Jiang from the vault rotation in the team finals, replacing her with Deng Linlin 20 minutes before the competition began.

In 2009, she participated in the 2009 Summer Universiade. She won a team gold medal with her teammates, Cheng Fei, He Ning, Zhou Zhuoru and Liu Nanxi.

In 2010, Jiang was selected to compete for the team of women representing China at the 2010 World Championships. The team qualified second into the team final, while Jiang herself qualified 4th into the all-around final along with teammate Huang Qiushuang. She also placed 5th on uneven bars, but she did not advance into the final due to the 'two per country rule', as her teammates He Kexin and Huang Qiushuang qualified first and second. In the team final, Jiang participated in all four events. Despite falls and mistakes made by Jiang and her teammates, the Chinese women team managed to secure a bronze medal, following Russia and the United States. In the all-around final, Jiang finished 2nd behind Russia's Aliya Mustafina, with a total score of 59.998. Jiang also competed in the Toyota Cup, winning gold on uneven bars and bronze on floor behind Aliya Mustafina and Sui Lu, who tied for gold.

She was selected as an alternate for the 2012 Summer Olympics in London.

Jiang served as the captain of the Chinese team after 2010. At the National Training Center, her responsibilities included looking after younger gymnasts at the dormitory.

== 2008 age controversy ==
In early 2008, fellow Chinese gymnast Yang Yun, admitted on national television that she was 14 years old when she competed in the 2000 Sydney Olympic Games. Consequently, there was frequent speculation that members of the Chinese women's gymnastics team were 14 years of age or under, violating the minimum age requirements of Fédération Internationale de Gymnastique (FIG), the governing body of the sport, that requires gymnasts to be 16.

The New York Times claimed that official media and some official Web sites in China, including that of the State General Administration of Sport, listed Chinese gymnasts' details which indicated that Jiang, He Kexin and Yang Yilin may have been as young as 14. Jiang was listed as being born on 1 October 1993, which would have made her too young to compete in 2008. In a 2006 article, it was stated that Jiang had given her birth year to reports as 1992. Other media through 2008, including the state broadcaster China Central Television, used this birth year as well. However, her official passport stated her birth date as being 1 November 1991.

During the Olympics, media focused their attention on Jiang, He, Yang and Deng. In response, Chinese officials claimed the discrepancies for He Kexin were caused by paperwork errors when the gymnast switched teams. Chinese authorities presented passport information to show that they were 16 years old as of 2008. Chinese coach Lu Shanzhen explained that Chinese competitors had for years all been small. "It is not just this time. It is a question of race. European and American athletes are all powerful, very robust. But Chinese athletes... are by nature that small." Sportswriter E.M. Swift criticized the IOC for "spend[ing] millions of dollars trying to ferret out drug cheats [while ignoring] allegations of institutionalized cheating" by the Chinese government.

On 22 August 2008 the International Olympic Committee (IOC) instructed the FIG to investigate the allegations that He Kexin was underage, and were asked to report back to the IOC later that day. The FIG accepted the passport ages as valid proof and declared the gymnasts eligible. On 23 August, further pressure led the FIG to request additional documentation on five of the six athletes on the Chinese team. IOC president Jacques Rogge said that FIG had demanded "birth certificates and all the documents like family books, entries in schools and things like that." While the FIG investigation was in progress, the IOC indicated reshuffling of the medals was unlikely. Having been satisfied with the proof of age received from the Chinese Gymnastics Association, the FIG ended the investigation on 1 October 2008, concluding that He and her teammates were eligible to compete. An article in the Chinese newspaper Life Daily noted that there was still suspicion that their documents were altered.

== Competitive highlights ==
Year	Competition Description	Location	Apparatus	Rank-Final	Score-Final	Rank-Qualifying	Score-Qualifying
2012	National Championships	Shanghai	All-around	2	56.100	5	53.250
2012	World Cup/Series	Doha	Uneven Bars	2	14.875	2	14.900
2012	World Cup/Series	Doha	Floor Exercise	3	14.000	3	14.050
2011	World Championships	Tokyo	Team	3	172.820	3	230.370
2011	World Championships	Tokyo	All-Around			20	55.074
2011	World Championships	Tokyo	Uneven Bars			75	12.866
2011	World Championships	Tokyo	Balance Beam			9	14.575
2011	World Championships	Tokyo	Floor			33	13.633
2011	World Cup/Series	Ghent	Uneven Bars	2	15.375	3	14.950
2011	World Cup/Series	Ghent	Balance Beam			15	13.125
2011	World Cup/Series	Ghent	Floor Exercise	8	12.050	8	13.300
2011	National Championships	Kunshan	Team	2	222.000		
2011	National Championships	Kunshan	All-around	5	54.650	7	55.450
2010	Asian Games	Guangzhou	Team	1	234.150		
2010	World Championships	Rotterdam	Team	3	174.781	2	233.778
2010	World Championships	Rotterdam	All-around	2	59.998	4	58.099
2010	World Championships	Rotterdam	Balance Beam			16	14.333
2010	World Championships	Rotterdam	Uneven Bars			5	15.200
2010	World Championships	Rotterdam	Floor Exercise			25	13.833
2009	National Games	Jinan	Team	4	164.675	4	217.550
2009	National Games	Jinan	All-Around	6	56.875		
2009	National Games	Jinan	Uneven Bars	6	14.275		
2008	World Cup/Series Final	Madrid	Floor Exercise	2	15.225		
2008	World Cup/Series Final	Madrid	Uneven Bars	2	15.700		
2008	Olympic Games	Beijing	Team	1	188.900	1	248.275
2008	Olympic Games	Beijing	All-Around	6	60.900	7	60.625
2008	Olympic Games	Beijing	Floor Exercise	4	15.350	8	15.050
2007	World Championships	Stuttgart	All-Around			147	44.825
2007	World Championships	Stuttgart	Floor Exercise	4	15.100	8	14.750
2007	World Championships	Stuttgart	Team	2	183.450	2	241.175
2007	World Championships	Stuttgart	Uneven Bars			16	15.375
2007	World Cup/Series	Shanghai	Floor Exercise	1	15.225		
2007	World Cup/Series	Shanghai	Uneven Bars	1	16.100		
2007	World Cup/Series	Shanghai	Vault	3	14.412		
