= Cheng Fei =

Chinese gymnast

- Full name: Cheng Fei
- Nickname: Fei Fei (菲菲)
- Born: May 29, 1988 (age 38) Huangshi, Hubei, China
- Height: 152 cm (5 ft 0 in)

Gymnastics career
- Discipline: Women's artistic gymnastics
- Country represented: China (2004–2012)
- Head coach: Lu Shenzhen
- Assistant coach: Liu Qun Lin
- Former coach: Yao Juying
- Eponymous skills: Vault: Yurchenko ½ on into 1½ twists off (5.6)
- Retired: June 14, 2012
Medal record
Representing China
Women's artistic gymnastics
Event	1st	2nd	3rd
Olympic Games	1	0	2
World Championships	5	1	0
World Cup Final	3	0	1
Asian Games	3	0	0
East Asian Games	2	1	0
Summer Universiade	1	1	0
Total	15	3	3
Olympic Games
Gold medal – first place	2008 Beijing	Team
Bronze medal – third place	2008 Beijing	Vault
Bronze medal – third place	2008 Beijing	Balance beam
World Championships
Gold medal – first place	2005 Melbourne	Vault
Gold medal – first place	2006 Aarhus	Team
Gold medal – first place	2006 Aarhus	Vault
Gold medal – first place	2006 Aarhus	Floor exercise
Gold medal – first place	2007 Stuttgart	Vault
Silver medal – second place	2007 Stuttgart	Team
World Cup Final
Gold medal – first place	2006 São Paulo	Vault
Gold medal – first place	2008 Madrid	Floor exercise
Gold medal – first place	2008 Madrid	Vault
Bronze medal – third place	2004 Birmingham	Floor exercise
Asian Games
Gold medal – first place	2006 Doha	Team
Gold medal – first place	2006 Doha	Vault
Gold medal – first place	2006 Doha	Floor exercise
East Asian Games
Gold medal – first place	2005 Macau	Team
Gold medal – first place	2005 Macau	Floor exercise
Silver medal – second place	2005 Macau	Vault
Summer Universiade
Gold medal – first place	2009 Belgrade	Team
Silver medal – second place	2009 Belgrade	Vault
National Games
Gold medal – first place	2005 Nanjing	Vault
Silver medal – second place	2005 Nanjing	All-around
Bronze medal – third place	2005 Nanjing	Floor exercise

Cheng Fei (Chinese: 程菲; pinyin: Chéng Fēi; born May 29, 1988) is a Chinese retired artistic gymnast. She is a three-time World Champion in the vault (2005–2007) and 2006 World Champion in floor exercise. She was a member of the gold medal-winning Chinese teams for the 2006 World Artistic Gymnastics Championships in Aarhus, Denmark and 2008 Olympic Games in Beijing, China. She was also a member of the silver medal-winning Chinese team for the 2007 World Artistic Gymnastics Championships in Stuttgart, Germany.

== Biography ==
Cheng Fei was born in central China's Hubei Province within a not very wealthy background to a father who was a shipping clerk and a mother who worked in a tire factory. Said her mother, "Our family was poor so we hoped Cheng Fei could in some way change her life...we thought maybe being a professional athlete is good for her." Her parents approached a gymnastics coach about training her by the time she was three and her father practiced calisthenics with her every morning before school. By the age of five, Cheng won her first competitive medal at a local competition. The 7-year-old Cheng was sent to Wuhan, where she joined the Wuhan Institute of Physical Education and officially entered the national sports program. Her first coach, Yao Juying, remembered her as being uniquely 'hard-working' and extraordinarily focused. At ten, Cheng was invited to join the Hubei provincial team. In late 2001, at the age of 13, she was accepted to the Chinese National Team. Her coaches are head coach Lu Shanzhen, and Liu Qun Lin.

Cheng is known for her powerful tumbling and her expressive floor routines. Sandra Izbașa has described her as a perfectionist, a great sport and a good friend.

She retired in June 2012 due rupturing her Achilles tendon while performing a tumbling pass on the floor.

== Competitive history ==
Cheng is a vaulting and floor exercise specialist. She has had national success in gymnastics as a two-time Chinese National Floor Exercise Champion (2004–2005), a two-time Chinese National Vault medalist (2003 and 2005) and the 2004 Chinese National Balance Beam Champion.

Internationally, she has been very successful as well. She competed with the Chinese team at the 2004 Olympic Games in Athens, Greece and although the team did not medal, she performed very well, scoring 9.475 on vault and 9.662 on floor. She also qualified for and competed in the floor exercise final, finishing 4th with a score of 9.412. She was the bronze medalist at the 2004 World Cup Final on floor exercise.

On 23 November 2005 Cheng made history at the 2005 World Artistic Gymnastics Championships in Melbourne, Australia, for being the first gymnast ever to successfully perform one of the most difficult vaults ever attempted by a woman. The vault, consisting of a round-off onto the springboard, a half-turn onto the vaulting horse and a 1½ somersault with a 540-degree turn in a straight body position, is now officially recognized in the FIG Code of Points as "The Cheng". It is one of the most difficult vaults in the code. During Event Finals on vault in Melbourne, Cheng scored 9.725 in her first vault (S.V: 10.0) and 9.587 in her second vault (S.V: 10.0), the "Cheng".

At the 2006 World Championships in Aarhus, Denmark, she competed on vault and floor exercise, qualifying in first position for both event finals. Her performances on those two pieces of apparatus were instrumental in securing victory for China in the team championship, but they also earned her the individual vault and floor exercise world titles. Cheng also won the gold medal on the vault at the 2006 World Cup Final in São Paulo, Brazil.

In 2007 Cheng began the year by winning the vault, balance beam and floor exercise titles at a World Cup event in Maribor, Slovenia. She was undefeated on vaulting and floor exercise in 2007 until the 2007 World Championships in Stuttgart, Germany. At those championships, Cheng was recognized as the leader for the Chinese women's team and though Cheng won her third World title on the vault, she made a serious error on the vault during the team championship where the Chinese team finished 2nd. She went on to finish 5th on floor exercise, with a score of 15.050, after stepping out of the bounds with both feet in her final tumbling series.

Cheng fulfilled her goal of competing at the 2008 Olympic Games in Beijing, China as the captain to the Chinese team. In the qualification, Cheng competed on three events, placing first on both vault and floor exercise, and fifth on balance beam. She was one of three female gymnasts to have entered 3 Olympic Event Finals in those Games, along with Nastia Liukin and Anna Pavlova. In the team final, She led the team to win China's first-ever women's gymnastics Olympic team gold medal in history. Individually, she won a bronze medal on vault (even after falling on her own "Cheng Fei vault"). She got 16.075 and 15.025 on her saltos. She won another bronze medal on balance beam (15.950) and placing 7th in the floor exercise event final (14.550), after an uncharacteristic fall. Cheng cried after the unfortunate vault and floor finals. After the Olympics, she said that she cried about her failure to capture the two gold medals she wanted most until she could cry no more. However, she received great support from both her fellow countrymen and the international gymnastics community, who acknowledged her talents and abilities as an exceptional gymnast. In a show of respect she gave the winner of the balance beam final Shawn Johnson of United States a small box with silk inside it.

After the Olympic Games, she competed in various competitions. She won three gold medals on vault, floor exercise and balance beam at the DTG World Cup in Stuttgart. Her last 2008 competition was the 14th Artistic Gymnastics World Cup in Madrid where she won two gold medals on vault and floor exercise.

In 2009, she competed at the 25th Universiade in Belgrade and won a team gold medal and a silver medal on Vault.

After taking almost two years off from competitions due to a leg injury, she competed in the 2011 Chinese National Championships in May on vault and floor exercise. She led the qualifications on vault and finished 2nd in the final. She announced her intention to compete in the University Games in August, but she was reported to be suffering from leg injury again and withdrew from the competition.

In April 2012, Cheng competed at the Zibo World Cup in her home country, qualifying second into the vault final behind the Dominican Republic's Yamilet Peña Abreu. She intended to compete floor as well but withdrew prior to the qualifying round. Cheng won the gold medal in the vault final.

Cheng injured her Achilles tendon in June 2012, taking her out of the running for the 2012 Chinese Olympic Team. In June 2012, she announced her retirement from elite artistic gymnastics and that she would be trying to switch from being an elite gymnast to a gymnastics coach.

== Skills ==
=== Eponymous skill ===
Cheng has one eponymous skill listed in the Code of Points.

Apparatus	Name	Description	Difficulty (Note: Valid for the 2025-2028 Code of Points)
Vault	Cheng	Round-off flic-flac with ½ turn (180°) on - stretched salto forward with 1½ turn (540°) off	5.6

=== Competitive routines ===
As of 2008, Cheng Fei performed the following skills on these apparatuses:

Apparatus	Skills	Score (2008 Code of Points)
Vault	1. Yurchenko 2½ (Amanar)	6.5
Vault	2. Round-off flic-flac with ½ turn on – stretched salto forward with 1½ turn off (Cheng)	6.5
Uneven bars	(Has not competed on this apparatus since 2005)	-
Balance beam	Free jump mount; full turn with leg at horizontal; flic-flac + salto bwd tucked with 1/1 twist; pike back salto; split jump + sheep jump; switch split ring leap + back tuck salto; aerial walkover + Rulfova; front tuck salto; flic-flac + flic-flac + 2.5 twist back salto	6.8
Floor exercise	Double twisting double tuck back; piked full in; triple spin; whip + triple twist 3/1; back layout 3/2 + front full 1/1; switch split ring leap + split leap; round-off + two and a half twisting dismount	6.6

== Competitive highlights ==
Year	Competition description	Location	Apparatus	Rank-final	Score-final	Rank-qualifying	Score-qualifying
2004	World Cup	Ghent	Vault	5	9.287		
2004	World Cup	Glasgow	Vault	3	9.187		
2004	World Cup	Glasgow	Floor	2	9.550		
2004	World Cup	Birmingham	Vault	5	9.362		
2004	World Cup	Birmingham	Floor	3	9.562		
2004	Olympic Games	Athens	Team	7	110.008	3	151.085
2004	Olympic Games	Athens	Vault			16	9.375
2004	Olympic Games	Athens	Floor	4	9.412	2	9.650
2004	Olympic Games	Athens	Beam			43	8.925
2005	World Cup	New York	Vault	3	9.331		
2005	World Cup	New York	Beam	5	8.937		
2005	World Cup	Ghent	Vault	3	9.312		
2005	World Championships	Melbourne	Vault	1	9.656	1	9.631
2005	World Championships	Melbourne	Floor			28	8.637
2006	World Cup	São Paulo	Vault	1	15.600		
2006	World Cup	São Paulo	Floor	5	14.625		
2006	World Cup	Shanghai	Vault	1	15.125		
2006	World Cup	Shanghai	Floor	1	15.400		
2006	World Cup	Lyon	Vault	1	14.987		
2006	World Cup	Lyon	Floor	1	14.975		
2006	World Championship	Aarhus	Team	1	182.200	2	239.525
2006	World Championship	Aarhus	Vault	1	15.712	1	15.975
2006	World Championship	Aarhus	Floor	1	15.875	1	15.475
2007	World Cup	Maribor	Vault	1	14.812	1	14.750
2007	World Cup	Maribor	Floor	1	14.825	1	15.050
2007	World Cup	Maribor	Beam	1	15.675	1	15.750
2007	World Cup	Shanghai	Vault	1	15.462		
2007	World Cup	Shanghai	Beam	1	16.150		
2007	World Championship	Stuttgart	Team	2	183.450	2	241.175
2007	World Championship	Stuttgart	Vault	1	15.937	1	15.625
2007	World Championship	Stuttgart	Floor	5	15.075	1	15.375
2007	World Championship	Stuttgart	Beam			15	15.300
2008	World Cup	Tianjin	Vault	1	14.975		
2008	World Cup	Tianjin	Floor	1	15.550		
2008	World Cup	Tianjin	Beam	1	15.925		
2008	Olympic Games	Beijing	Team	1	188.900	1	248.275
2008	Olympic Games	Beijing	Vault	3	15.562	1	15.912
2008	Olympic Games	Beijing	Floor	7	14.550	1	15.750
2008	Olympic Games	Beijing	Beam	3	15.950	4	15.875
2008	World Cup	Stuttgart	Vault	1	14.900	1	14.962
2008	World Cup	Stuttgart	Floor	1	15.250	1	14.975
2008	World Cup	Stuttgart	Beam	1	15.425	1	15.525
2008	World Cup	Madrid	Vault	1	15.050		
2008	World Cup	Madrid	Floor	1	15.375		
2008	World Cup	Madrid	Beam	6	13.825		

== Floor music ==
- 2003: Lord of the Dance from Riverdance
- 2004: Variations from Don Quixote
- 2005–2007: Mas Zarzuela
- 2008: Yellow River Concerto
