= 2007 European Youth Summer Olympic Festival =

2007 European Youth Olympic Festival
- Host city: Belgrade
- Country: Serbia
- Nations: 49
- Athletes: 3,000
- Sport: 11
- Events: 100
- Opening: July 21, 2007
- Closing: July 28, 2007
- Opened by: Snežana Samardžić-Marković; Minister of Youth and Sport
- Torch lighter: Jasna Šekarić
- Main venue: Belgrade Arena

Summer

Winter

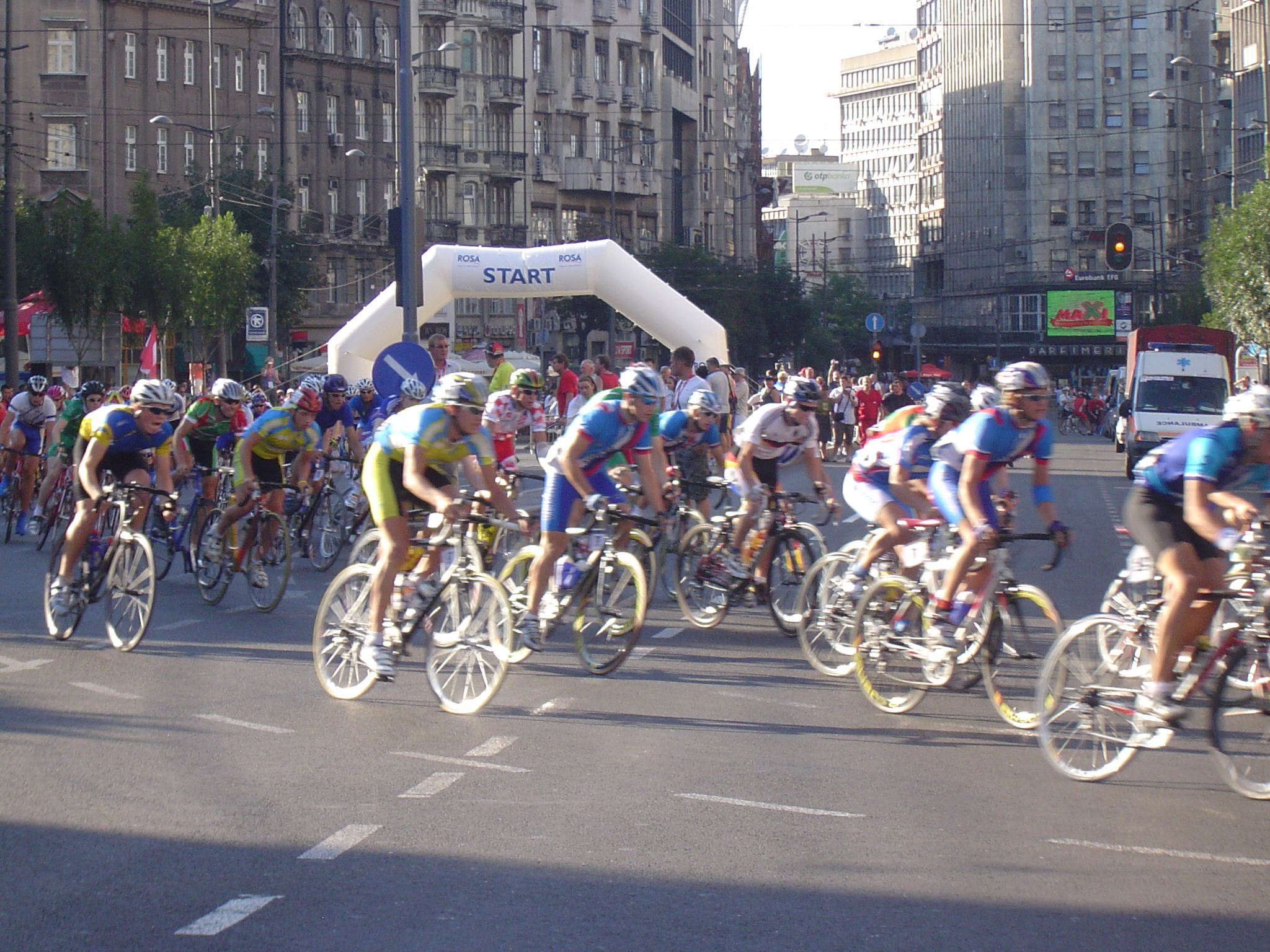
Cycling at the EYOF 2007

The 2007 European Youth Summer Olympic Festival was held in Belgrade, Serbia, from 21 until 28 July 2007.

== Sports ==
2007 European Youth Summer Olympic Festival Sports Programme
- Athletics
- Basketball
- Cycling
- Gymnastics
- Handball
- Judo
- Swimming
- Table tennis
- Tennis
- Volleyball
- Water polo

== Venues ==
Venues used:

Venue	Location	Sports
Partizan Stadium	Belgrade	Athletics
Belgrade Fair	Belgrade	Gymnastics
Palata Sportova	Belgrade	Judo
Tašmajdan Sports Centre	Belgrade	Swimming
Ledena Dvorana	Belgrade	Table tennis
Zvezdara Sport Recreation Centre	Belgrade	Tennis
Sport EKO Dvorana	Belgrade	Basketball
Banjica Sport Recreation Centre	Belgrade	Water polo
Sumice Hall	Belgrade	Volleyball
Pioneer's Hall	Belgrade	Handball
Roads of Belgrade	Belgrade	Cycling

== Participating nations ==
Participating National Olympic Committees
- Albania
- Andorra
- Armenia
- Austria
- Azerbaijan
- Belarus
- Belgium
- Bosnia and Herzegovina
- Bulgaria
- Croatia
- Cyprus
- Czech Republic
- Denmark
- Estonia (68)
- Finland
- France
- Georgia
- Germany
- Great Britain
- Greece
- Hungary
- Iceland
- Ireland
- Israel
- Italy
- Latvia
- Liechtenstein
- Lithuania
- Luxembourg
- Macedonia
- Malta
- Moldova
- Monaco
- Montenegro
- Netherlands
- Norway
- Poland
- Portugal
- Romania
- Russia
- San Marino
- Serbia
- Slovakia
- Slovenia
- Spain
- Sweden
- Switzerland
- Turkey
- Ukraine

== Medal table ==
* Host nation (Serbia)

Rank	Nation	Gold	Silver	Bronze	Total
1	Russia (RUS)	18	6	8	32
2	Great Britain (GBR)	9	7	8	24
3	Italy (ITA)	9	7	6	22
4	Germany (GER)	8	8	16	32
5	Ukraine (UKR)	8	6	4	18
6	Azerbaijan (AZE)	7	0	0	7
7	Belgium (BEL)	4	3	3	10
8	Romania (ROU)	4	1	3	8
9	Poland (POL)	3	8	5	16
10	France (FRA)	3	6	8	17
11	Netherlands (NED)	3	6	1	10
12	Hungary (HUN)	3	5	15	23
13	Serbia (SRB)*	3	3	3	9
14	Latvia (LAT)	3	2	0	5
15	Croatia (CRO)	2	4	2	8
16	Georgia (GEO)	2	2	2	6
17	Slovakia (SVK)	1	4	3	8
18	Sweden (SWE)	1	3	3	7
19	Slovenia (SLO)	1	3	2	6
20	Spain (ESP)	1	2	4	7
21	Turkey (TUR)	1	2	2	5
22	Portugal (POR)	1	1	1	3
22	Switzerland (SUI)	1	1	1	3
24	Estonia (EST)	1	1	0	2
25	Denmark (DEN)	1	0	4	5
26	Lithuania (LTU)	1	0	2	3
27	Bulgaria (BUL)	1	0	1	2
28	Ireland (IRL)	0	2	3	5
29	Austria (AUT)	0	2	1	3
30	Belarus (BLR)	0	1	2	3
30	Israel (ISR)	0	1	2	3
32	Finland (FIN)	0	1	1	2
32	Norway (NOR)	0	1	1	2
34	Bosnia and Herzegovina (BIH)	0	1	0	1
35	Czech Republic (CZE)	0	0	3	3
36	Greece (GRE)	0	0	1	1
36	Luxembourg (LUX)	0	0	1	1
Totals (37 entries)		100	100	122	322

== See also ==
- 2007 Australian Youth Olympic Festival
