= Gymnastics at the 2012 Summer Olympics – Qualification =

Qualification for gymnastics events at the 2012 Summer Olympics was based on the results of the three world gymnastics championships (rhythmic, artistic and trampoline) held in autumn 2011 and Olympic Test Events to be held in January 2012 at the North Greenwich Arena. In addition, the Fédération Internationale de Gymnastique and the IOC Tripartite Commission for Gymnastics allocated places to ensure certain minimum levels of representation.

== Qualification timeline ==
Event	Date	Venue
2011 World Rhythmic Gymnastics Championships	September 19–25, 2011	(France) Montpellier
2011 World Artistic Gymnastics Championships	October 7–16, 2011	(Japan) Tokyo
2011 Trampoline World Championships	November 17–20, 2011	(United Kingdom) Birmingham
Olympic Test Event	January 10–18, 2012	(United Kingdom) London

== Qualification summary ==
* Artistic gymnastics, NOCs with 5 entered athletes may also enter the team competition.

Nation	Artistic		Rhythmic		Trampoline		Total
Nation	Men	Women	Individual	Group	Men	Women	Total
Argentina	1	1					2
Australia	1	5	1		1		8
Austria	1	1	1				3
Armenia	1						1
Azerbaijan	1		1				2
Bangladesh	1						1
Belarus	1	1	2	6	1	1	12
Belgium	1	1					2
Brazil	3	5					8
Bulgaria	1	1	1	6			9
Canada	1	5		6	1	2	15
Chile	1	1					2
China	5	5	1		2	2	15
Colombia	1	1					2
Croatia	1	1					2
Cyprus			1				1
Czech Republic	1	1				1	3
Denmark					1		1
Dominican Republic		1					1
Egypt	1	2	1				4
Finland		1					1
France	5	5	1		1		12
Georgia						1	1
Germany	5	5	1	6	1	1	19
Greece	2	1		6			9
Great Britain	5	5	1	6		1	18
Guatemala		1					1
Hong Kong	1	1					2
Hungary	2	1					3
Ireland	1						1
Israel	2	1	1	6			10
Italy	5	5	1	6	1		18
Japan	5	5		6	2	1	19
Kazakhstan	1	1	1				3
Latvia	1						1
Lithuania	1	1					2
Mexico	1	1					2
Netherlands	1	1				1	3
Poland	1	1	1				3
Portugal	1	1			1	1	4
Puerto Rico	1	1					2
Romania	5	5					10
Russia	5	5	2	6	2	1	21
Singapore		1					1
Slovakia	1	1					2
Slovenia		1					1
Switzerland	1	1					2
South Korea	5	1	1				7
Spain	5	1	1	6			13
Sweden		1					1
Tunisia	1						1
Turkey		1					1
Ukraine	5	1	2	6	1	1	16
United States	5	5	1		1	1	13
Uzbekistan		1	1			1	3
Venezuela		1					1
Vietnam	1	2					3
Total: 58 NOCs	98	98	24	72	16	16	324

== Artistic ==
=== Men ===
Event	Criterion	Qualified
Teams (of 5)
World Championships	Team places 1–8	China; Japan; United States; Germany; Russia; South Korea; Romania; Ukraine
Olympic Test Event (teams 9-16 from WC)	Team places 1-4	Great Britain; France; Spain; Italy
TOTAL		12 (60 gymnasts)
Individuals
World Championships individual apparatus medalists	Floor	Diego Hypólito (BRA); Alexander Shatilov (ISR)
World Championships individual apparatus medalists	Pommel horse	Krisztián Berki (HUN)
World Championships individual apparatus medalists	Rings	Arthur Nabarrete Zanetti (BRA)
World Championships individual apparatus medalists	Vault	—N/a
World Championships individual apparatus medalists	Parallel bars	Vasileios Tsolakidis (GRE)
World Championships individual apparatus medalists	High bar	—N/a
FIG Executive Board invitations	Host nation	-
FIG Executive Board invitations	Africa	Egypt; Wajdi Bouallègue (TUN)
FIG Executive Board invitations	Oceania	-
Tripartite invitation		Syque Caesar (BAN)
Olympic Test Event	Individual all-around placings (max. 1 per NOC)	Canada*; Sérgio Sasaki (BRA); Puerto Rico*; Belarus*; Daniel Corral Barron (MEX); Tomás González (CHI); Wai Hung Shek (HKG); Filip Ude (CRO); Vlasios Maras (GRE); Samuel Piasecký (SVK); Fabian Leimlehner (AUT); Colombia**; Roman Kulesza (POL); Switzerland**; Epke Zonderland (NED); Australia**; Artur Davtyan (ARM); Portugal**; Stepan Gorbachev (KAZ); Rokas Guščinas (LTU); Pham Phouc Hung (VIE); Dmitrijs Trefilovs (LAT); Felix Aronovich (ISR); Vid Hidvégi (HUN); Yordan Yovchev (BUL); Federico Molinari (ARG); Jimmy Verbaeys (BEL); Martin Konečný (CZE); Kieran Behan (IRL); Shakir Shikhaliyev (AZE)
TOTAL		98

- * NOC may choose any gymnast
- ** NOC has choice between 2 gymnasts

=== Women ===
Event	Criterion	Qualified
Teams (of 5)
World Championships	Team places 1–8	United States; Russia; China; Romania; Japan; Australia; Germany; Great Britain
Olympic Test Event (teams 9-16 from WC)	Team places 1-4	Italy; Canada; France; Brazil
TOTAL		12 (60 gymnasts)
Individuals
World Championships individual apparatus medalists	Vault	Phan Thị Hà Thanh (VIE)
World Championships individual apparatus medalists	Uneven bars	—N/a
World Championships individual apparatus medalists	Balance beam	—N/a
World Championships individual apparatus medalists	Floor	—N/a
FIG Executive Board invitations	Africa	Sherine El Zeiny (EGY); Salma Mahmoud (EGY)
Olympic Test Event	Individual all-around placings (max. 1 per NOC)	Belgium*; South Korea*; Spain*; Wyomi Masela (NED); Switzerland**; Ana Sofía Gómez (GUA); Elsa García (MEX); Venezuela**; Valeriia Maksiuta (ISR); Greece**; Hungary**; Marta Pihan-Kulesza (POL); Kristýna Pálešová (CZE); Barbara Gasser (AUT); Jessica Gil Ortíz (COL); Ukraine**; Jonna Adlerteg (SWE); Tina Erceg (CRO); Valeria Pereyra (ARG); Uzbekistan**; Slovenia**; Göksu Üçtaş (TUR); Simona Castro (CHI); Laura Švilpaitė (LTU); Ralitsa Mileva (BUL); Angel Wong (HKG); Annika Urvikko (FIN); Lorena Quiñones (PUR); Mária Homolová (SVK); Lim Heem Wei (SIN); Moldir Azimbay (KAZ); Nastassia Marachkouskaya (BLR); Zoi Lima (POR); Yamilet Peña (DOM); Đỗ Thị Ngân Thương (VIE)
TOTAL		98

- * NOC may choose any gymnast
- ** NOC has choice between 2 gymnasts

== Rhythmic ==
=== Individual ===
Event	Criterion	Qualified
World Championships	Places 1-15 (max. 2 per NOC)	Russia; Russia; Belarus; Belarus; Azerbaijan; Ukraine; Bulgaria; Poland; Uzbekistan; Israel; South Korea; France; China; Italy; Austria
Olympic Test Event (24 participants, including NOCs ranked 16-24 and best 11 gymnasts not qualified to all-around final in WC)	Top 5 (max. 1 per NOC)	Kazakhstan; Ukraine; Spain; Cyprus; Germany
FIG Executive Board invitations	Host nation	Great Britain
FIG Executive Board invitations	Continents not qualified (3 places)	United States; Egypt; Australia
TOTAL		24

=== Group ===
Event	Criterion	Qualified
World Championships	All-around places 1–6	Italy; Russia; Bulgaria; Belarus; Japan; Germany
Olympic Test Event (places 7-13 from WC and host nation)	Top 4	Spain; Ukraine; Israel; Greece
FIG Executive Board invitations	Host nation	Great Britain
FIG Executive Board invitations	Continents not qualified	Canada
TOTAL		12

- Great Britain as host is entitled to send a team to compete in the Rhythmic Gymnastics Group event, British Gymnastics and the British Olympic Association (BOA) announced that team would only be sent if the team achieved a benchmark score at the test event. In the event, they narrowly failed to do so, and British Gymnastics announced it would not nominate the team to the BOA for inclusion. The GB Rhythmic Gymnastics group successfully appealed on 5 March 2012. The place offered by the BOA was subsequently taken up by British Gymnastics.

== Trampoline ==
=== Men ===
Event	Criterion	Qualified
World Championships	Top 8 (max. 2 per NOC)	China; China; Japan; Japan; Russia; Russia; France; Ukraine
Olympic Test Event (16 participants)	Top 8 (max. 1 per NOC)	Canada; Portugal; Australia; Germany; Italy; United States; Denmark; Belarus
FIG Executive Board invitations	Host nation and each continent	-
Tripartite invitation		-
TOTAL		16

=== Women ===
Event	Criterion	Qualified
World Championships	Top 8 (max. 2 per NOC)	China; China; Belarus; Canada; Canada; Germany; United States; Great Britain
Olympic Test Event (16 participants)	Top 8 (max. 1 per NOC)	Georgia; Portugal; Czech Republic; Russia; Netherlands; Ukraine; Japan; Uzbekistan
FIG Executive Board invitations	Host nation and each continent	-
Tripartite invitation		-
TOTAL		16
