= 2009 World Artistic Gymnastics Championships – Women's qualification =

The women's qualification took place at the O2 Arena on October 14, 2009.

Women	Name	Country	Date of birth	Age
Youngest	Ida Laisi	Finland	14/12/93	15 years
Oldest	Fieke Willems	Netherlands	18/10/82	26 years

== Individual all-around ==
Rank	Gymnast	Vault (gymnastics)	Uneven bars	Balance beam	Floor (gymnastics)	Total
1	Rebecca Bross (USA)	14.250	15.050	14.150	13.950	57.400
2	Ana Porgras (ROU)	13.700	14.575	14.850	14.175	57.300
3	Lauren Mitchell (AUS)	14.475	13.750	14.400	14.050	56.675
4	Deng Linlin (CHN)	14.075	13.825	14.450	14.000	56.350
5	Bridget Sloan (USA)	14.550	14.600	13.325	13.600	56.075
6	Ekaterina Kurbatova (RUS)	14.525	14.200	13.750	13.475	55.950
7	Kōko Tsurumi (JPN)	13.550	14.775	14.375	13.225	55.925
8	Yang Yilin (CHN)	14.275	13.825	14.375	13.025	55.500
9	Ariella Käslin (SUI)	15.075	13.625	13.275	13.475	55.450
10	Ksenia Semenova (RUS)	13.850	14.200	14.075	12.775	54.900
11	Ana María Izurieta (ESP)	14.600	12.600	14.025	13.525	54.750
12	Youna Dufournet (FRA)	14.000	12.850	13.900	13.625	54.375
13	Anamaria Tămârjan (ROU)	14.225	13.700	12.900	13.425	54.250
14	Elsa García (MEX)	14.025	13.375	13.500	13.325	54.225
15	Pauline Morel (FRA)	13.625	14.050	13.375	13.150	54.200
16	Kim Bùi (GER)	13.825	13.850	13.225	13.275	54.175
17	Paola Galante (ITA)	13.375	13.400	13.925	13.450	54.150
18	Brittany Rogers (CAN)	14.100	13.850	13.250	12.850	54.050
19	Rebecca Wing (GBR)	13.675	13.350	13.600	13.250	53.875
20	Becky Downie (GBR)	14.300	13.675	12.500	13.300	53.775
21	Miki Uemura (JPN)	13.525	13.700	13.200	12.900	53.325
22	Kim Un-hyang (PRK)	13.500	11.900	14.775	12.950	53.125
23	Bruna Leal (BRA)	13.750	12.875	12.975	13.250	52.850
24	Veronica Wagner (SWE)	13.600	12.900	13.800	12.450	52.750
25	Mayra Kroonen (NED)	13.600	12.525	13.150	13.375	52.650
26	Yana Demyanchuk (UKR)	13.225	13.150	12.975	13.175	52.525
27	Elisabeth Seitz (GER)	13.250	13.200	12.375	13.400	52.225
28	Charlotte Mackie (CAN)	13.650	11.950	13.675	12.700	51.975
29	Ida Jonsson (SWE)	13.500	13.125	12.900	12.325	51.850
30	Dorina Böczögő (HUN)	13.150	12.500	13.100	13.300	51.750
31	Nathalia Sánchez (COL)	13.475	13.650	13.225	11.375	51.725
32	Joy Goedkoop (NED)	13.425	12.600	12.950	12.650	51.625
33	Sydney Sawa (CAN)	13.800	13.350	11.875	12.575	51.600
34	Anna Serra (ESP)	13.175	12.725	12.800	12.900	51.600
35	Ethiene Franco (BRA)	13.400	13.300	11.300	13.450	51.450
36	Georgia Bonora (AUS)	13.400	12.900	13.250	11.825	51.375
37	Jessica López (VEN)	13.500	13.525	11.625	12.650	51.300
38	Göksu Uçtaş (TUR)	12.725	11.725	13.550	13.275	51.275
39	Marta Pihan-Kulesza (POL)	12.100	14.025	12.150	12.975	51.250
40	Emily Armi (ITA)	13.275	11.325	13.525	13.100	51.225
41	Annika Urvikko (FIN)	13.450	12.575	12.575	12.400	51.000
41	Roni Rabinovitz (ISR)	12.825	12.675	12.575	12.925	51.000
43	Erika García (MEX)	13.465	11.800	12.875	12.800	50.950
44	Luiza Galiulina (UZB)	12.775	12.350	11.875	12.850	49.850
45	Jo Hyun-joo (KOR)	13.575	11.325	12.550	12.350	49.800
46	Sherine El Zeiny (EGY)	13.400	11.175	12.800	12.250	49.625
47	Laura Gombás (HUN)	13.300	10.725	13.150	12.425	49.600
47	Lisa Ecker (AUT)	13.425	11.500	12.425	12.250	49.600
49	Valeria Maksyuta (ISR)	13.850	12.950	10.375	12.375	49.550
50	Eva Verbová (CZE)	12.700	12.500	11.850	11.850	48.900
51	Jennifer Senn (SUI)	13.075	12.950	11.050	11.575	48.650
52	Katarzyna Jurkowska (POL)	13.100	10.675	12.350	12.050	48.175
53	Ivet Rojas (VEN)	13.425	10.150	12.025	12.400	48.000
54	Iliana Sheytanova (BUL)	12.675	12.650	10.475	11.525	47.325
55	Tjaša Kysselef (SLO)	12.875	8.975	13.000	12.425	47.275
56	Ralitsa Mileva (BUL)	13.125	10.825	11.675	11.625	47.250
57	Kang Yong-mi (PRK)	12.975	11.150	12.550	10.250	46.925
58	Hiu Ying Angel Wong (HKG)	13.300	10.625	10.825	12.100	46.850
59	Jennifer Khwela (RSA)	13.250	10.825	10.275	12.300	46.650
60	Han Byul (KOR)	13.175	9.850	11.625	11.825	46.475
61	Catalina Escobar (COL)	12.400	12.000	10.975	11.025	46.400
62	Zoi Lima (POR)	12.925	9.875	11.550	12.025	46.375
63	Ayelén Tarabini (ARG)	13.075	10.475	10.125	12.525	46.200
64	Alina Sotnikava (BLR)	13.375	10.550	10.550	11.375	45.850
65	Chantel Swan (RSA)	12.750	12.250	9.350	11.425	45.775
66	Julie Hansson (NOR)	12.875	11.150	10.225	11.475	45.725
67	Hadas Koren (ISR)	12.025	9.375	12.650	10.575	44.625
68	Simona Castro (CHI)	13.375	9.650	9.125	12.400	44.550
69	Marilena Georgiou (CYP)	12.275	10.925	10.850	10.375	44.425
70	Mette Hulgaard (DEN)	12.675	9.150	10.725	11.200	43.750
71	Jekaterina Kovaliova (LTU)	12.675	9.275	11.500	10.250	43.700
72	Sandra Ostad (NOR)	12.800	9.500	10.200	10.450	42.950
73	Salma Mahmoud El Said Mohamed (EGY)	12.100	8.525	11.900	10.400	42.925
74	Anna Myzdrikova (RUS)	14.600		13.825	14.500	42.925
75	Kaisey Griffith (BER)	12.850	8.600	9.800	10.725	41.975
76	Rebecca Wallace (IRL)	10.925	8.875	9.525	12.000	41.325
77	Ružica Buzov (CRO)	11.950	9.725	9.675	9.950	41.300
78	Caitlyn Mello (BER)	12.450	7.900	9.725	11.100	41.175
79	Hong Un-jong (PRK)	15.500		12.350	12.750	40.600
80	Phan Thị Hà Thanh (VIE)	13.350		12.675	12.600	38.625
81	Viktoria Tsakalidou (GRE)	13.950	13.125	11.425		38.500
82	Priti Das (IND)	12.075	6.725	9.800	8.600	37.200
83	Meenakshi (IND)	11.175	7.125	8.575	9.475	36.350
84	Nourhan Ahmed Saad (EGY)	12.650		11.600	11.650	35.900
85	Fanni Helminen (FIN)	12.750	11.475	11.625		35.850
86	Đỗ Thị Ngân Thương (VIE)		12.425	11.700	11.500	35.625
87	Ida Laisi (FIN)	13.125	10.900	11.575		35.600
88	Giuliana Bentivegna (ARG)	12.100		10.050	11.700	33.850
89	Sarah Wedel (IRL)	11.950		9.900	10.800	32.650
90	Aimee O'Driscoll (IRL)	12.650	9.525		10.450	32.625
91	Riselda Selaj (ALB)	11.450		10.150	10.125	31.725
92	Leysha López (PUR)		7.725	11.850	10.050	29.625
93	Kayla Williams (USA)	14.825			13.900	28.725
94	Sui Lu (CHN)			14.325	14.275	28.600
95	Gabriela Drăgoi (ROU)		14.150	13.800		27.950
96	Beth Tweddle (GBR)		13.850		14.075	27.925
97	Diana Chelaru (ROU)	14.225			13.475	27.700
98	Marissa King (GBR)	14.250			13.400	27.650
99	Elisabetta Preziosa (ITA)			14.275	13.350	27.625
100	Ivana Hong (USA)		13.150	14.400		27.550
101	Vasiliki Millousi (GRE)		13.200	14.000		27.200
102	Jana Komrsková (CZE)		13.900		13.200	27.100
103	Anastasia Koval (UKR)		13.900	12.900		26.800
104	Jessica Gil Ortiz (COL)	12.700			14.050	26.750
105	Thais Escolar (ESP)			13.725	12.800	26.525
106	Yessenia Estrada (MEX)	13.800			12.650	26.450
107	Tina Erceg (CRO)			13.500	12.950	26.450
108	Priscila Domingues (BRA)	13.050			13.175	26.225
109	Valentyna Holenkova (UKR)	12.350			13.325	25.675
110	Sanne Wevers (NED)			13.600	11.800	25.400
111	Hanna Grosch (AUT)	12.725	12.650			25.375
112	Ivana Kováčová (SVK)		12.000	13.250		25.250
113	Fieke Willems (NED)	13.250	11.975			25.225
114	Michelle Lauritsen (DEN)	13.025	11.875			24.900
115	Maike Roll (GER)			12.475	12.425	24.900
116	Alina Kozich (UZB)			13.025	11.700	24.725
117	Khiuani Dias (BRA)		12.500	11.825		24.325
118	Jasmin Mader (AUT)			11.900	12.175	24.075
119	Thelma Hermannsdóttir (ISL)	12.800	0.000		10.800	23.600
120	Dipa Karmakar (IND)	13.150			10.425	23.575
121	Nikoletta Dimitriou (CYP)		12.200	11.200		23.400
122	Kyoko Oshima (JPN)		13.125		10.125	23.250
123	Maria Edner (SWE)	12.375		10.825		23.200
124	Alexandra Olsson (SWE)		11.075		11.750	22.825
125	Ornela Cuka (ALB)	12.350			10.000	22.350
126	Saša Golob (SLO)			10.150	11.700	21.850
127	Marisela Cantú (MEX)		9.225	12.450		21.675
128	Lotte Bøe (NOR)			9.550	10.950	20.500
129	Celia León (CHI)		0.000	9.400	8.650	18.050
130	Tumpa Debnath (IND)		8.125	8.950		17.075
131	Eum Eun-hui (KOR)		9.475	6.925		16.400
132	He Kexin (CHN)		15.975			15.975
133	Cha Yong-hwa (PRK)		15.025			15.025
134	Larrissa Miller (AUS)		14.650			14.650
135	Serena Licchetta (ITA)		14.200			14.200
136	Anja Brinker (GER)		13.650			13.650
137	Yuko Shintake (JPN)			13.625		13.625
138	Lucia Tacchelli (SUI)		13.350			13.350
139	Evgenia Zafeiraki (GRE)	13.000				13.000
140	Dariya Zgoba (UKR)			12.350		12.350
141	Barbara Gasser (AUT)		12.325			12.325
142	Jana Šikulová (CZE)		11.850			11.850
143	Shona Morgan (AUS)			11.025		11.025
144	Katja Bou Aram (LIB)		10.875			10.875
145	Martina Castro (CHI)				10.825	10.825
146	Hannah Kristine Buch (NOR)	0.000	9.725			9.725

== Vault ==
Rank	Gymnast	Nation	D Score	E Score	Pen.	Score 1	D Score	E Score	Pen.	Score 2	Total	Qual.
Rank	Gymnast	Nation	Vault 1				Vault 2				Total	Qual.
1	Kayla Williams	United States	6.300	8.525		14.825	5.800	9.000		14.800	14.812	Q
2	Hong Un-jong	North Korea	6.500	9.000		15.500	5.200	8.875		14.075	14.787	Q
3	Anna Myzdrikova	Russia	5.800	8.900	0.1	14.600	5.600	8.800	0.1	14.300	14.450	Q
4	Ariella Käslin	Switzerland	6.300	8.775		15.075	5.300	8.575	0.3	13.575	14.325	Q
5	Ekaterina Kurbatova	Russia	5.800	8.725		14.525	5.600	8.625	0.3	13.925	14.225	Q
6	Youna Dufournet	France	5.300	8.800	0.1	14.000	5.600	8.825		14.425	14.212	Q
7	Brittany Rogers	Canada	5.300	8.800		14.100	5.200	8.650		13.850	13.975	Q
8	Elsa García	Mexico	5.300	8.825	0.1	14.025	5.200	8.500		13.700	13.862	Q
9	Rebecca Downie	Great Britain	5.800	8.500		14.300	4.800	8.600		13.400	13.850	R
10	Marissa King	Great Britain	5.500	8.750		14.250	5.000	8.450		13.450	13.850	R
11	Jana Komrsková	Czech Republic	5.200	8.700		13.900	5.000	8.725		13.725	13.812	R

== Uneven bars ==
Rank	Gymnast	Nation	D Score	E Score	Pen.	Total	Qual.
1	He Kexin	China	7.100	8.875		15.975	Q
2	Rebecca Bross	United States	6.200	8.850		15.050	Q
3	Cha Yong-hwa	North Korea	6.500	8.525		15.025	Q
4	Koko Tsurumi	Japan	6.000	8.775		14.775	Q
5	Larrissa Miller	Australia	6.100	8.550		14.650	Q
6	Bridget Sloan	United States	5.900	8.700		14.600	Q
7	Ana Porgras	Romania	6.200	8.375		14.575	Q
8	Serena Licchetta	Italy	5.800	8.400		14.200	Q
9	Ekaterina Kurbatova	Russia	5.900	8.300		14.200	R
10	Ksenia Semenova	Russia	6.400	7.800		14.200	R
11	Gabriela Drăgoi	Romania	6.000	8.150		14.150	R

== Balance beam ==
Rank	Gymnast	Nation	D Score	E Score	Pen.	Total	Qual.
1	Ana Porgras	Romania	6.200	8.650		14.850	Q
2	Kim Un-hyang	North Korea	6.300	8.475		14.775	Q
3	Deng Linlin	China	6.400	8.150	0.1	14.450	Q
4	Ivana Hong	United States	5.900	8.500		14.400	Q
5	Lauren Mitchell	Australia	6.300	8.100		14.400	Q
6	Koko Tsurumi	Japan	5.500	8.875		14.375	Q
7	Yang Yilin	China	5.500	8.875		14.375	Q
8	Sui Lu	China	5.900	8.525	0.1	14.325	-
9	Elisabetta Preziosa	Italy	5.800	8.475		14.275	Q
10	Rebecca Bross	United States	6.200	7.950		14.150	R
11	Ksenia Semenova	Russia	5.600	8.475		14.075	R
12	Ana María Izurieta	Spain	5.700	8.325		14.025	R

== Floor exercise ==
Rank	Gymnast	Nation	D Score	E Score	Pen.	Total	Qual.
1	Anna Myzdrikova	Russia	5.900	8.600		14.500	Q
2	Sui Lu	China	5.700	8.575		14.275	Q
3	Ana Porgras	Romania	5.700	8.475		14.175	Q
4	Beth Tweddle	Great Britain	6.100	7.975		14.075	Q
5	Lauren Mitchell	Australia	5.800	8.350	0.1	14.050	Q
6	Jessica Gil Ortiz	Colombia	5.800	8.250		14.050	Q
7	Deng Linlin	China	5.400	8.600		14.000	Q
8	Rebecca Bross	United States	5.700	8.250		13.950	Q
9	Kayla Williams	United States	5.600	8.300		13.900	R
10	Youna Dufournet	France	5.600	8.025		13.625	R
11	Bridget Sloan	United States	5.700	7.900		13.600	-
12	Ana María Izurieta	Spain	5.500	8.025		13.525	R
