= Gymnastics at the 2012 Summer Olympics – Women's artistic qualification =

The qualifications round of the women's artistic gymnastics competition at the 2012 Summer Olympics was held at the North Greenwich Arena on July 29. The top 8 teams advanced to the team final, the top 24 gymnasts (with a limit of two per country) to the individual all-around final, and the top 8 gymnasts on each apparatus (with a limit of two per country) to the apparatus finals.

== Subdivisions ==
Gymnasts from nations taking part in the team all-around event were grouped together, while gymnasts competing without full teams were divided into eight "mixed groups". The groups were split among five subdivisions according to a draw held by the Fédération Internationale de Gymnastique, and rotated through the four apparatuses together.

=== Subdivision 1 ===
- Brazil
- Mixed Group 1
  - Kristýna Pálešová (CZE)
  - Yamilet Peña (DOM)
  - Wong Hiu Ying (HKG)
  - Dorina Böczögő (HUN)
- Mixed Group 2
  - Elsa García (MEX)
  - Gaelle Mys (BEL)
  - Moldir Azimbay (KAZ)
  - Göksu Üçtaş (TUR)
  - Ana Sofía Gómez (GUA)
- Mixed Group 6
  - Jonna Adlerteg (SWE)
  - Vasiliki Millousi (GRE)
  - Valeria Pereyra (ARG)
  - Annika Urvikko (FIN)
  - Heo Seon-mi (KOR)

=== Subdivision 2 ===
- Australia
- Italy
- Mixed Group 3
  - Marta Pihan-Kulesza (POL)
  - Tina Erceg (CRO)
  - Giulia Steingruber (SUI)
  - Lorena Quiñones (PUR)
  - Mária Homolová (SVK)
- Mixed Group 4
  - Đỗ Thị Ngân Thương (VIE)
  - Nataliya Kononenko (UKR)
  - Zoi Lima (POR)
  - Valeria Maksyuta (ISR)

=== Subdivision 3 ===
- Canada
- France
- Great Britain
- United States

=== Subdivision 4 ===
- China
- Germany
- Russia
- Mixed Group 7
  - Barbara Gasser (AUT)
  - Jessica Gil Ortiz (COL)
  - Nastassia Marachkouskaya (BLR)
  - Jessica López (VEN)
  - Luiza Galiulina (UZB) DSQ

=== Subdivision 5 ===
- Japan
- Romania
- Mixed Group 5
  - Phan Thị Hà Thanh (VIE)
  - Saša Golob (SLO)
  - Céline van Gerner (NED)
  - Simona Castro (CHI)
  - Salma Mohamed (EGY)
- Mixed Group 8
  - Laura Švilpaitė (LTU)
  - Lim Heem Wei (SGP)
  - Ana María Izurieta (ESP)
  - Ralitsa Mileva (BUL)
  - Sherine El-Zeiny (EGY)

== Results ==
Team/Gymnast	Vault (gymnastics)		Uneven bars		Balance beam		Floor (gymnastics)		Total (All-around)	
Team/Gymnast	Score (Note: Gymnasts who wanted to qualify for the vault final performed a second vault, with the average of the two counting for event final qualification. Only the first vault counted for individual and team all-around qualification.)	Rank	Score	Rank	Score	Rank	Score	Rank	Score	Rank
Teams
United States	47.633	1	45.032	4	45.441	1	43.757	2	181.863	1
Gabby Douglas (USA)	15.900	=1	15.333	6	15.266	3	13.766	33	60.265	3
Jordyn Wieber (USA)	15.833	3	14.833	12	14.700	=12	14.666	6	60.032	4
Aly Raisman (USA)	15.800	4	14.166	23	15.100	5	15.325	1	60.391	2
Kyla Ross (USA)			14.866	11	15.075	6	13.733	34		
McKayla Maroney (USA)	15.900	=1								
Russia	46.299	2	45.566	2	45.232	2	43.332	3	180.429	2
Viktoria Komova (RUS)	15.633	5	15.833	3	15.266	2	13.900	28	60.632	1
Aliya Mustafina (RUS)	15.133	=8	15.700	5	14.700	=12	14.433	8	59.966	5
Anastasia Grishina (RUS)	14.333	32	14.033	28	14.900	9	14.066	21	57.332	12
Ksenia Afanasyeva (RUS)					15.066	7	14.833	4		
Maria Paseka (RUS)	15.533	6	0.000	79						
China	43.566	6	46.998	1	44.432	4	41.641	8	176.637	3
Huang Qiushuang (CHN)	15.000	=12	15.266	7	13.866	28	13.575	38	57.707	10
Deng Linlin (CHN)	14.833	15	14.166	24	15.166	4	13.833	29	57.998	6
He Kexin (CHN)	13.733	=51	15.966	2						
Sui Lu (CHN)					15.400	1	14.233	13		
Yao Jinnan (CHN)	13.133	70	15.766	4	12.833	51	13.066	54	54.798	22
Romania	45.733	3	41.833	8	44.699	3	43.999	1	176.264	4
Cătălina Ponor (ROU)	15.133	=8			15.033	8	14.600	7		
Larisa Iordache (ROU)	15.100	10	14.100	26	14.800	11	13.800	32	57.800	9
Sandra Izbașa (ROU)	15.500	7	12.366	67	14.600	14	15.066	2	57.532	11
Diana Bulimar (ROU)			14.000	30	14.866	10				
Diana Chelaru (ROU)	14.666	=21	13.733	34			14.333	10		
Great Britain	43.333	7	45.158	3	39.632	10	42.533	6	170.656	5
Rebecca Tunney (GBR)	14.400	29	14.825	13	13.166	39	14.000	=23	56.391	15
Beth Tweddle (GBR)			16.133	1			14.433	9		
Hannah Whelan (GBR)	14.500	26	14.200	22	13.066	=43	13.933	25	55.699	17
Imogen Cairns (GBR)	14.433	28			13.366	37				
Jennifer Pinches (GBR)	14.366	=30	13.700	36	13.100	41	14.100	19	55.266	21
Japan	42.033	11	44.232	5	42.765	5	41.166	9	170.196	6
Asuka Teramoto (JPN)	14.600	23	14.566	15	14.466	15	14.233	12	57.865	8
Yuko Shintake (JPN)	13.633	=57			14.166	22	13.633	36		
Kōko Tsurumi (JPN)	13.800	=45	15.033	9						
Rie Tanaka (JPN)	13.000	71	14.633	14	13.400	36	13.300	46	54.333	27
Yu Minobe (JPN)			13.066	53	14.133	24	12.966	57		
Italy	42.466	10	40.974	10	42.124	6	42.833	4	168.397	7
Vanessa Ferrari (ITA)	14.366	=30	14.233	21	14.433	16	14.900	3	57.932	7
Carlotta Ferlito (ITA)	14.100	=37	13.075	52	14.425	17	13.900	26	55.500	20
Erika Fasana (ITA)	14.000	41	13.666	37	12.266	62	14.033	22	53.965	30
Elisabetta Preziosa (ITA)	13.733	=51			13.266	38	13.300	45		
Giorgia Campana (ITA)			12.766	60						
Canada	43.599	5	42.699	7	38.832	12	42.566	5	167.696	8
Ellie Black (CAN)	14.800	=16			13.966	26	14.233	15		
Dominique Pegg (CAN)	14.133	=34	13.725	35	13.566	34	14.233	14	55.657	18
Brittany Rogers (CAN)	14.666	=21	14.500	16						
Victoria Moors (CAN)			13.833	33	11.266	79	14.100	20		
Kristina Vaculik (CAN)	14.100	=37	14.366	18	11.300	78	13.800	30	53.566	32
Germany	43.966	4	43.332	6	39.333	11	40.700	11	167.331	9
Elisabeth Seitz (GER)	14.800	=16	15.166	8	12.700	54	13.800	31	56.466	14
Oksana Chusovitina (GER)	15.033	11			13.700	31				
Kim Bui (GER)			14.300	19	12.433	56	13.600	37		
Janine Berger (GER)	14.133	=34	12.866	57			13.300	47		
Nadine Jarosch (GER)	12.866	72	13.866	32	12.933	50	13.300	48	52.965	35
Australia	42.499	9	40.724	11	40.999	7	42.499	7	166.721	10
Lauren Mitchell (AUS)	13.933	=42			14.300	20	14.833	5		
Emily Little (AUS)	14.766	20	13.433	40	13.633	33	12.666	65	54.498	24
Larrissa Miller (AUS)			14.025	29			13.466	42		
Ashleigh Brennan (AUS)	13.700	=53	13.266	47	13.066	=43	14.200	16	54.232	28
Georgia Bonora (AUS)	13.800	=45	13.100	51	13.066	=43				
France	42.765	8	41.333	9	40.866	8	39.832	12	164.796	11
Youna Dufournet (FRA)	14.166	33	14.500	17	14.200	21				
Anne Kuhm (FRA)	14.466	27	13.533	38	12.566	55	13.533	39	54.098	29
Mira Boumejmajen (FRA)			13.300	43	12.966	49	12.933	60		
Aurélie Malaussena (FRA)	14.033	40	13.300	44	13.700	32	13.366	44	54.399	25
Sophia Serseri (FRA)	14.133	=34					12.933	61		
Brazil	41.765	12	38.799	12	39.966	9	40.765	10	161.295	12
Daiane dos Santos (BRA)	13.933	=42	12.966	54			14.166	17		
Daniele Hypólito (BRA)	13.766	50	12.900	56	14.166	23	11.900	80	52.732	37
Bruna Leal (BRA)	14.066	39	12.466	64	12.800	52	13.433	43	52.765	36
Ethiene Franco (BRA)	13.566	=60	12.933	55	13.000	48	13.166	50	52.665	38
Harumy de Freitas (BRA)					12.033	67				
Jessica López (VEN)	14.566	24	14.266	20	13.933	27	13.900	27	56.665	13
Ana Sofía Gómez (GUA)	14.533	25	13.266	49	14.333	19	14.000	23	56.132	16
Céline van Gerner (NED)	13.700	53	14.866	10	14.100	25	12.966	56	55.632	19
Giulia Steingruber (SUI)	14.783	19	13.266	48	13.766	29	12.900	62	54.715	23
Marta Pihan-Kulesza (POL)	13.833	44	14.033	27	12.166	64	14.333	11	54.365	26
Gaelle Mys (BEL)	13.533	=62	13.266	=45	13.733	30	13.166	51	53.698	31
Ana María Izurieta (ESP)	14.800	=16	12.600	62	12.000	69	14.133	18	53.533	33
Vasiliki Millousi (GRE)	12.800	=74	13.425	42	14.366	18	12.933	58	53.524	34
Jonna Adlerteg (SWE)	13.933	59	13.933	31	12.200	63	12.466	70	52.532	39
Tina Erceg (CRO)	13.500	65	12.833	58	12.266	60	13.466	41	52.065	40
Salma Mohamed (EGY)	13.533	=62	12.566	63	13.066	42	12.500	69	51.665	41
Jessica Gil Ortiz (COL)	13.533	=62	12.633	61	12.266	61	13.066	53	51.498	42
Simona Castro (CHI)	13.666	56	12.266	68	12.400	57	12.600	66	50.932	43
Nataliya Kononenko (UKR)	12.833	73	13.433	41	12.066	66	12.500	68	50.832	44
Lim Heem Wei (SIN)	13.333	67	12.400	66	13.033	46	12.033	77	50.799	45
Barbara Gasser (AUT)	13.700	=54	12.800	59	12.000	68	12.133	75	50.633	46
Kristýna Pálešová (CZE)	13.800	=45	14.133	25	9.700	83	12.966	55	50.599	47
Heo Seon-mi (KOR)	13.800	=45	12.166	69	11.400	76	13.233	49	50.599	48
Dorina Böczögő (HUN)	12.633	79	13.200	50	11.600	73	13.166	52	50.599	49
Laura Švilpaitė (LTU)	12.233	80	13.500	39	11.900	71	12.666	64	50.299	50
Valeria Pereyra (ARG)	13.366	66	13.266	=45	10.566	81	12.600	67	49.798	51
Wong Hiu Ying (HKG)	13.533	=62	11.866	71	11.466	75	12.800	63	49.765	52
Zoi Lima (POR)	13.566	=60	11.766	72	12.266	59	12.033	78	49.631	53
Lorena Quiñones (PUR)	13.800	=45	10.766	75	13.133	40	11.366	81	49.065	54
Annika Urvikko (FIN)	13.200	=68	12.966	65	10.933	80	12.216	73	48.815	55
Ralitsa Mileva (BUL)	13.200	=68	10.966	74	12.066	65	12.200	74	48.432	56
Mária Homolová (SVK)	12.766	77	10.458	77	11.733	72	12.066	76	47.023	57
Moldir Azimbay (KAZ)	12.800	=74	10.700	76	11.566	74	11.933	79	46.999	58
Valeria Maksyuta (ISR)	12.800	=74	9.433	78	10.533	82	12.933	59	45.699	59
Saša Golob (SLO)	0.000	81	12.066	70	13.033	47	13.500	40	38.599	60
Nastassia Marachkouskaya (BLR)	13.800	=45			13.558	35				
Yamilet Peña (DOM)	14.933	13					12.300	72		
Phan Thị Hà Thanh (VIE)	13.533	=62					12.466	71		
Elsa García (MEX)					12.400	58	13.733	35		
Sherine El-Zeiny (EGY)					12.733	53	11.000	82		
Đỗ Thị Ngân Thương (VIE)			11.466	73	11.966	70				
Göksu Üçtaş (TUR)					11.333	77				
Luiza Galiulina (UZB)	DSQ									

== Individual all-around qualifiers ==
Position	Gymnast	Vault (gymnastics)	Uneven bars	Balance beam	Floor (gymnastics)	Total
1st	Viktoria Komova (RUS)	15.633	15.833	15.266	13.900	60.632
2nd	Aly Raisman (USA)	15.800	14.166	15.100	15.325	60.391
3rd	Gabby Douglas (USA)	15.900	15.333	15.266	13.766	60.265
4th	Aliya Mustafina (RUS)	15.133	15.700	14.700	14.433	59.966
5th	Deng Linlin (CHN)	14.833	14.166	15.166	13.833	57.998
6th	Vanessa Ferrari (ITA)	14.366	14.233	14.433	14.900	57.932
7th	Asuka Teramoto (JPN)	14.600	14.566	14.466	14.233	57.865
8th	Larisa Iordache (ROU)	15.100	14.100	14.800	13.800	57.800
9th	Huang Qiushuang (CHN)	15.000	15.266	13.866	13.575	57.707
10th	Sandra Izbașa (ROU)	15.500	12.366	14.600	15.066	57.532
11th	Jessica López (VEN)	14.566	14.266	13.933	13.900	56.665
12th	Elisabeth Seitz (GER)	14.800	15.166	12.700	13.800	56.466
13th	Rebecca Tunney (GBR)	14.400	14.825	13.166	14.000	56.391
14th	Ana Sofía Gómez (GUA)	14.533	13.266	14.333	14.000	56.132
15th	Hannah Whelan (GBR)	14.500	14.200	13.066	13.933	55.699
16th	Dominique Pegg (CAN)	14.133	13.275	13.566	14.233	55.657
17th	Céline van Gerner (NED)	13.700	14.866	14.100	12.966	55.632
18th	Carlotta Ferlito (ITA)	14.100	13.075	14.425	13.900	55.500
19th	Giulia Steingruber (SUI)	14.783	13.266	13.766	12.900	54.715
20th	Emily Little (AUS)	14.766	13.433	13.633	12.666	54.498
21st	Aurélie Malaussena (FRA)	14.033	13.300	13.700	13.366	54.399
22nd	Marta Pihan-Kulesza (POL)	13.833	14.033	12.166	14.333	54.365
23rd	Rie Tanaka (JPN)	13.000	14.633	13.400	13.300	54.333
24th	Ashleigh Brennan (AUS)	13.700	13.266	13.066	14.200	54.232

Because only two competitors per country were allowed to advance to the all-around final, some gymnasts in the top 24 did not advance. They were:

- Jordyn Wieber (USA) (4th place)
- Anastasia Grishina (RUS) (12th place)
- Jennifer Pinches (GBR) (21st place)
- Yao Jinnan (CHN) (22nd place)

=== Reserves ===
The reserves for the individual all-around final were:

- Anne Kuhm (FRA)
- Gaelle Mys (BEL)
- Kristina Vaculik (CAN)
- Ana María Izurieta (ESP)

== Vault final qualifiers ==
Position	Gymnast	Vault 1				Vault 2				Total
Position	Gymnast	A Score	B Score	Penalty	Vault Score	A Score	B Score	Penalty	Vault Score	Total
1	McKayla Maroney (USA)	6.500	9.400		15.900	6.100	9.600		15.700	15.800
2	Sandra Izbașa (ROU)	6.100	9.400		15.500	5.800	9.333		15.133	15.316
3	Maria Paseka (RUS)	6.500	9.033		15.533	5.600	8.966		14.566	15.049
4	Oksana Chusovitina (GER)	6.300	8.833	0.10	15.033	5.500	9.083		14.583	14.808
5	Yamilet Peña (DOM)	7.100	7.833		14.933	5.800	8.666		14.466	14.699
6	Janine Berger (GER)	6.300	7.833		14.133	6.000	8.833		14.833	14.483
7	Brittany Rogers (CAN)	5.800	8.866		14.666	5.600	8.700		14.300	14.483
8	Ellie Black (CAN)	6.300	8.500		14.800	5.200	8.733		13.933	14.366

=== Reserves ===
- Giulia Steingruber (SUI)
- Nastassia Marachkouskaya (BLR)
- Phan Thị Hà Thanh (VIE)

== Uneven bars final qualifiers ==
Rank	Gymnast	D Score	E Score	Pen.	Total
1	Beth Tweddle (GBR)	7.000	9.133		16.133
2	He Kexin (CHN)	7.100	8.866		15.966
3	Viktoria Komova (RUS)	7.000	8.833		15.833
4	Yao Jinnan (CHN)	6.800	8.966		15.766
5	Aliya Mustafina (RUS)	7.000	8.700		15.700
6	Gabby Douglas (USA)	6.600	8.733		15.333
8	Elisabeth Seitz (GER)	6.700	8.466		15.166
9	Kōko Tsurumi (JPN)^{[Note 1]}	6.600	8.433		15.033

=== Reserves ===
- Céline van Gerner (NED)
- Kyla Ross (USA)
- Rebecca Tunney (GBR)

Notes

^{1} China's Huang Qiushuang ranked 7th with a score of 15.266, but did not qualify to the final because of the two-per-country rule. Kōko Tsurumi, ranked 9th, qualified instead. Similarly, Jordyn Wieber did not qualify as the third reserve because two other Americans ranked higher.

== Balance beam final qualifiers ==
Rank	Gymnast	D Score	E Score	Pen.	Total	Qual.
1	Sui Lu (CHN)	6.400	9.000		15.400	Q
2	Viktoria Komova (RUS)	6.400	8.866		15.266	Q
3	Gabby Douglas (USA)	6.500	8.766		15.266	Q
4	Deng Linlin (CHN)	6.500	8.666		15.166	Q
5	Aly Raisman (USA)	6.400	8.700		15.100	Q
7	Ksenia Afanasyeva (RUS)	5.900	9.166		15.066	Q
8	Cătălina Ponor (ROU)	6.400	8.633		15.033	Q
10	Diana Bulimar (ROU)^{[Note 1]}	6.100	8.766		14.866	Q

=== Reserves ===
- Asuka Teramoto (JPN)
- Vanessa Ferrari (ITA)
- Carlotta Ferlito (ITA)

Notes

^{1} The United States' Kyla Ross ranked 6th with a score of 15.075, but did not qualify to the final because of the two-per-country rule; Anastasia Grishina of Russia, who was next in line in 9th place, could not qualify for the same reason. Diana Bulimar, in 10th place, qualified instead. Also because of the two-per-country rule, Larisa Iordache (ROU), Aliya Mustafina (RUS), Jordyn Wieber (USA), and Sandra Izbașa (ROU) did not qualify as reserves.

== Floor exercise final qualifiers ==
Rank	Gymnast	D Score	E Score	Pen.	Total	Qual.
1	Aly Raisman (USA)	6.500	8.825		15.325	Q
2	Sandra Izbașa (ROU)	6.300	8.766		15.066	Q
3	Vanessa Ferrari (ITA)	6.200	8.700		14.900	Q
4	Ksenia Afanasyeva (RUS)	5.900	8.933		14.833	Q
5	Lauren Mitchell (AUS)	6.300	8.533		14.833	Q
6	Jordyn Wieber (USA)	6.000	8.766	0.10	14.666	Q
7	Cătălina Ponor (ROU)	5.900	8.700		14.600	Q
8	Aliya Mustafina (RUS)	5.900	8.633	0.10	14.433	Q

=== Reserves ===
- Beth Tweddle (GBR)
- Marta Pihan-Kulesza (POL)
- Asuka Teramoto (JPN)^{[Note 1]}

Notes

^{1} Romania's Diana Chelaru ranked 10th but did not qualify as a reserve because of the two-per-country rule.
