= Gymnastics at the 2011 Summer Universiade – Women's artistic individual all-around =

The women's artistic individual all-around at the 2011 Summer Universiade was held on August 15 at the Boa'an District Gym in Shenzhen, China.

== Results ==
Rank	Gymnast	Vault (gymnastics)	Uneven bars	Balance beam	Floor (gymnastics)	Total
1st place, gold medalist(s)	Xiao Kangjun (CHN)	13.700	15.000	14.200	13.800	56.700
2nd place, silver medalist(s)	Mai Yamagishi (JPN)	13.600	14.250	14.350	13.900	56.100
3rd place, bronze medalist(s)	Alena Polyan (RUS)	13.800	13.150	14.200	14.200	55.350
4	Yu Minobe (JPN)	13.050	13.600	14.250	13.550	54.450
5	Kristýna Pálešová (CZE)	12.600	14.050	13.650	13.100	53.400
6	Jana Šikulová (CZE)	12.550	13.850	13.300	13.350	53.050
7	Irina Sazonova (RUS)	13.500	12.600	13.350	13.550	53.000
8	Yana Demyanchuk (UKR)	12.750	12.650	13.950	13.150	52.500
9	Maria Frandofert (POL)	13.200	12.850	12.900	12.800	51.750
10	Barbara Gasser (AUT)	13.300	13.200	12.250	12.600	51.350
11	Jenna Walters (GBR)	12.850	12.650	12.900	12.200	50.600
12	Ivana Kamnikar (SLO)	12.800	13.100	12.700	11.550	50.150
12	Mária Homolová (SVK)	13.050	13.000	11.800	12.300	50.150
14	Rebecca Hall (GBR)	12.900	12.300	11.600	12.100	48.900
15	Hiu Ying Angel Wong (HKG)	13.600	9.400	12.150	13.200	48.350
15	Cha Myeong Ji (KOR)	13.400	10.550	11.700	12.700	48.350
17	Adela Sajn (SLO)	13.150	9.550	12.400	13.050	48.150
18	Liu Hsiang Han Mai (TPE)	12.350	10.600	12.400	11.800	47.150
19	Tijana Tkalcec (CRO)	13.700	10.800	9.550	11.750	45.800
20	Jo Hyun-Joo (KOR) (Note: Jo was taken out of the arena on a stretcher after falling off the uneven bars. She had a soft tissue injury in her neck.)	14.050	3.750	-	-	17.800
21	Angelina Kysla (UKR)	-	3.850	-	-	3.850
