= Austrian Rhythmic Gymnastics Championships =

The Austrian Rhythmic Gymnastics Championship is the most important national rhythmic gymnastics competition in Austria, it has been held annually by the Austrian Gymnastics Federation since 1968.

== Medalists ==
=== All-Around ===
Year	Gold	Silver	Bronze
1968	Helga Schüller	Liesl Strobl	Herta Zwolanek
1969	Helga Schüller	Friedtraud Hettfleisch	Roswitha Seidl
1970	Friedtraud Hettfleisch	Roswitha Seidl	Helga Schüller
1971	Helga Schüller	Gabriele Frank	Friedtraud Schenk
1972	Doris Kandler	Gundi Binder	Gabriele Frank
1973	unknown	unknown	unknown
1974	unknown	unknown	unknown
1975	Doris Kandler	Petra Ovcaric	Ingeborg Werther
1976	Ursula Wiklickti	Edith Haas	Monika Kreuzer
1977	Ursula Wiklickti	Monika Kreuzer	E. Strümpf
1978	Ursula Wiklickti	Monika Bachman	Birgitt Haase
1979	Ursula Wiklickti	Birgitt Haase	Petra Haase
1980	Monika Bachman / Gabi Jusek	Margareta Strümpf	Petra Haase
1981	Ursula Wiklickti	Gertrude Ramsauer	Ulli Weiss
1982	Elke Göschl	Ulli Weiss	Karin Elmer
1983	Elke Göschl	Gertrude Ramsauer	Karin Elmer
1984	Gertrude Ramsauer	Elke Nürnberger	Karin Elmer
1985	Gertrude Ramsauer	Margit Stadler	Gudrun Frick
1986	Gerlinde Hemmer	Margit Stadler	Karin Lachnit
1987	Elisabeth Bergmann	Karin Laachnit	Michaela Preininger
1988	Elisabeth Bergmann	Manuela Bayer	Elke Nürnberger
1989	Manuela Bayer	Elke Nürnberger	Claudia Vorisek
1990	Manuela Bayer	Claudia Vorisek	Petra Schmidjörg
1991	Sandra Kumhofer	Petra Schmidjörg	Claudia Vorisek
1992	Tanja Alge	Ruth Schneeberger	Sabine Michlfeit
1993	Tanja Alge	Nina Taborsky	Alexandra Rollett
1994	Birgit Schielin	Nina Taborsky	Ingrid Burian
1995	Birgit Schielin	Nina Taborsky	Kristina Hruza
1996	Birgit Schielin	Kristina Hruza	Alexandra Baer
1997	Birgit Schielin	Valerie Hackl	Alexandra Baer
1998	Julia Edelhauser	Sandra Amort	Viktoria Gusbeth
1999	Ursula Zigler	Barbara Radakovics	Viktoria Gusbeth
2000	Ursula Zigler	Julia Edelhauser	Viktoria Gusbeth
2001	Ursula Zigler	Hanna Oberhofer	Viktoria Gusbeth
2002	Hanna Oberhofer	Caroline Weber	Viktoria Gusbeth
2003	Caroline Weber	Martina Kragl	Catherine Czak
2004	Caroline Weber	Martina Kragl	Catherine Czak
2005	Caroline Weber	Catherine Czak	Valentina Baldauf
2006	Caroline Weber	Sabrina Pilhatsch	Catherine Czak
2007	Caroline Weber	Selina Pöstinger	Katharina Reitgruber
2008	Caroline Weber	Selina Pöstinger	Nicol Ruprecht
2009	Caroline Weber	Selina Pöstinger	Nicol Ruprecht
2010	Caroline Weber	Nicol Ruprecht	Selina Pöstinger
2011	Caroline Weber	Nicol Ruprecht	Selina Pöstinger
2012	Caroline Weber	Nicol Ruprecht	Sophia Lindtner
2013	Nicol Ruprecht	Natascha Wegscheider	Sophia Lindtner
2014	Nicol Ruprecht	Natascha Wegscheider	Vanessa Nachbaur
2015	Nicol Ruprecht	Natascha Wegscheider	Julia Meder
2016	Nicol Ruprecht	Natascha Wegscheider	Noelle Breuss
2017	Nicol Ruprecht	Julia Meder	Nicole Weinl
2018	Nicol Ruprecht	Lisa Hofmann	Julia Meder
2019	Nicol Ruprecht	Julia Meder	Blanka Boldizsar
2020	Nicol Ruprecht	Julia Meder	Leona Marchart
2021	Nicol Ruprecht	Valentina Domenig-Ozimic	Julia Meder
2022	Valentina Domenig-Ozimic	Franziska Herzog	Lena Möhring
2023	Julia Neumann	Valentina Domenig-Ozimic	Dina Mironskaya
2024	Serafyma Sytnikova	Julia Neumann	Dina Mironskaya
2025	Julia Neumann	Dina Mironskaya	Arina Mironskaya
2026	Maya Nickonchuk	Dina Mironskaya	Arina Mironskaya
