= 2010 FIG Artistic Gymnastics World Cup series =

International gymnastics competition series

FIG Artistic Gymnastics World Cup series
- Location: various — see locations
- Date: March 5 – November 21, 2010 see schedule

The 2010 FIG Artistic Gymnastics World Cup series was a series of stages where events in men's and women's artistic gymnastics were contested.

== World Cup stages ==
Date	Event	Location
5–7 March	Gymnix World Cup	Montreal, Canada
12–14 March	Turnier Der Meister World Cup	Cottbus, Germany
22–24 March	Doha World Cup	Doha, Qatar
10–11 April	Internationaux de France World Cup	Paris, France
7–9 May	Salamun Memorial World Cup	Maribor, Slovenia
14–15 May	Moscow World Cup	Moscow, Russia
18–20 June	Porto World Cup	Porto, Portugal
11–12 September	Ghent World Cup	Ghent, Belgium
28 September – 2 October	Ostrava World Cup	Ostrava, Czech Republic
5–7 November	Osijek World Cup	Osijek, Croatia
12–14 November	DTB-Pokal World Cup	Stuttgart, Germany
18–21 November	Glasgow World Cup	Glasgow, United Kingdom

== Medalists ==
=== Men ===
Competition	Event	Gold	Silver	Bronze
Montreal	Floor exercise	(Japan) Shunsuke Kikuchi	(Japan) Kyoichi Watanabe	(Canada) Kevin Lytwyn
Montreal	Pommel horse	(Hungary) Krisztián Berki	(Canada) Ken Ikeda	(Japan) Kohei Kameyama
Montreal	Rings	(Canada) Kevin Lytwyn	(Jordan) Ali Al-Asi	(Japan) Kohei Kameyama
Montreal	Vault	(Canada) Nathan Gafuik	(Japan) Shunsuke Kikuchi	(Finland) Tomi Tuuha
Montreal	Parallel bars	(Japan) Kyoichi Watanabe	(Canada) Ken Ikeda	(Canada) Kevin Lytwyn
Montreal	Horizontal bar	(Japan) Kohei Kameyama	(Slovenia) Aljaž Pegan	(Canada) Jackson Payne
Cottbus	Floor exercise	(Germany) Marcel Nguyen	(Greece) Stavros Kekelos	(Netherlands) Jeffrey Wammes
Cottbus	Pommel horse	(Slovenia) Sašo Bertoncelj	(Japan) Koki Sakamoto	(Russia) Matvei Petrov
Cottbus	Rings	(France) Samir Aït Saïd	(Hungary) Attila Racz	(Uzbekistan) Anton Fokin
Cottbus	Vault	(Germany) Matthias Fahrig	(Romania) Alin Sandu Jivan	(Netherlands) Jeffrey Wammes
Cottbus	Parallel bars	(Japan) Yosuke Hoshi	(Netherlands) Epke Zonderland	(Switzerland) Claudio Capelli
Cottbus	Horizontal bar	(Netherlands) Epke Zonderland	(Japan) Yosuke Hoshi	(Japan) Takuya Nijima
Doha	Floor exercise	(China) Huang Yuguo	(Japan) Hisashi Mizutori	(Netherlands) Jeffrey Wammes
Doha	Pommel horse	(Hungary) Krisztián Berki	(Germany) Sebastian Krimmer	(China) Dong Zhendong
Doha	Rings	(Jordan) Ali Al-Asi	(Japan) Kazuki Machida	(Hong Kong) Ng Kiu Chung
Doha	Rings	(Jordan) Ali Al-Asi	(Japan) Kazuki Machida	(Netherlands) Jeffrey Wammes
Doha	Vault	(China) Cao Yulong	(Latvia) Evgeni Sapronenko	(Netherlands) Jeffrey Wammes
Doha	Parallel bars	(China) Dong Zhendong	(Poland) Adam Kierzkowski	(China) Chen Xuezhang
Doha	Horizontal bar	(Netherlands) Epke Zonderland	(China) Zhang Chenglong	(Slovenia) Aljaž Pegan
Paris	Floor exercise	(Brazil) Diego Hypólito	(Greece) Eleftherios Kosmidis	(France) Gaël Da Silva
Paris	Pommel horse	(France) Cyril Tommasone	(Croatia) Robert Seligman	(Russia) Andrey Perevoznikov
Paris	Rings	(France) Samir Aït Saïd	(Japan) Kohei Uchimura	None awarded
Paris	Rings	(France) Samir Aït Saïd	(United States) Jonathan Horton	None awarded
Paris	Vault	(Spain) Isaac Botella	(Kazakhstan) Stanislav Valiyev	None awarded
Paris	Vault	(Spain) Isaac Botella	(Netherlands) Jeffrey Wammes	None awarded
Paris	Parallel bars	(Belarus) Aliaksandr Tsarevich	None awarded	(Greece) Vasileios Tsolakidis
Paris	Parallel bars	(France) Hamilton Sabot	None awarded	(Greece) Vasileios Tsolakidis
Paris	Horizontal bar	(Japan) Kohei Uchimura	(France) Yann Cucherat	(United States) Jonathan Horton
Maribor	Floor exercise	(Netherlands) Kas van Weelden	(Slovenia) Rok Klavora	(Netherlands) Carlo van Minde
Maribor	Pommel horse	(Slovenia) Sašo Bertoncelj	(Belgium) Donna-Donny Truyens	(Hungary) Zoltan Kalai
Maribor	Rings	(Slovenia) Gregor Saksida	(Slovakia) Daniel Kamenicky	(Austria) Fabian Leimlehner
Maribor	Vault	(Latvia) Evgeni Sapronenko	(Hungary) Peter Marjan	(Finland) Tomi Tuuha
Maribor	Parallel bars	(Slovakia) Samuel Piasecký	(Austria) Fabian Leimlehner	(Slovakia) Andrej Neczli
Maribor	Horizontal bar	(Slovenia) Aljaž Pegan	(Croatia) Marijo Možnik	(Slovakia) Samuel Piasecký
Moscow	Floor exercise	(Brazil) Diego Hypólito	(Russia) Anton Golotsutskov	(Netherlands) Jeffrey Wammes
Moscow	Pommel horse	(Slovenia) Sašo Bertoncelj	(United States) Alexander Naddour	(Russia) Andrey Perevoznikov
Moscow	Rings	(Russia) Aleksandr Balandin	(Russia) Konstantin Pluzhnikov	(Jordan) Ali Al-Asi
Moscow	Vault	(Russia) Anton Golotsutskov	(Brazil) Diego Hypólito	(North Korea) Ri Se-gwang
Moscow	Parallel bars	(North Korea) Kim Jin-hyok	(Uzbekistan) Anton Fokin	(United States) Tim McNeill
Moscow	Horizontal bar	(Slovenia) Aljaž Pegan	(Ukraine) Nikolai Kuksenkov	(United States) Paul Ruggeri
Porto	Floor exercise	(Romania) Flavius Koczi	(Brazil) Diego Hypólito	(Mexico) Santiago Lopez
Porto	Pommel horse	(China) Guo Weiyang	(Romania) Flavius Koczi	(Spain) Rafael Martínez
Porto	Rings	(China) Chen Yibing	(China) Liao Junlin	(Spain) Ivan San Miguel
Porto	Vault	(Romania) Flavius Koczi	(Brazil) Diego Hypólito	(Spain) Ivan San Miguel
Porto	Parallel bars	(China) Feng Zhe	(China) Guo Weiyang	(Colombia) Jorge Hugo Giraldo
Porto	Horizontal bar	(China) Feng Zhe	(Spain) Rafael Martínez	(Slovakia) Samuel Piasecký
Ghent	Floor exercise	(Greece) Eleftherios Kosmidis	(Chile) Tomás González	(Croatia) Tomislav Markovic
Ghent	Pommel horse	(China) Guo Weiyang	(United Kingdom) Louis Smith	(Italy) Alberto Busnari
Ghent	Rings	(Netherlands) Yuri van Gelder	(China) Liao Junlin	(Greece) Eleftherios Petrounias
Ghent	Vault	(Netherlands) Jeffrey Wammes	(Latvia) Evgeni Sapronenko	(Finland) Tomi Tuuha
Ghent	Parallel bars	(China) Guo Weiyang	(Poland) Roman Kulesza	(Spain) Manuel Carballo
Ghent	Horizontal bar	(China) Guo Weiyang	(Greece) Vlasios Maras	(Poland) Roman Kulesza
Ostrava	Floor exercise	(Greece) Eleftherios Kosmidis	(Belgium) Volkaert Siemon	(Slovakia) Samuel Piasecký
Ostrava	Pommel horse	(Croatia) Robert Seligman	(Belgium) Donna-Donny Truyens	(Slovenia) Sašo Bertoncelj
Ostrava	Rings	(Iran) Hadi Khenarinezhad	(Poland) Marek Lyszczarz	(Greece) Eleftherios Kosmidis
Ostrava	Vault	(Poland) Marek Lyszczarz	(Greece) Eleftherios Kosmidis	(Iran) Mohammad Ramezanpour
Ostrava	Parallel bars	(Poland) Adam Kierzkowski	(Colombia) Didier Lugo Sichaca	(Poland) Roman Kulesza
Ostrava	Horizontal bar	(Poland) Roman Kulesza	(Austria) Marco Baldauf	(Austria) Fabian Leimlehner
Osijek	Floor exercise	(Croatia) Tomislav Markovic	(Italy) Enrico Pozzo	(Finland) Sakari Vekki
Osijek	Pommel horse	(Hungary) Krisztián Berki	(Croatia) Robert Seligman	(Croatia) Filip Ude
Osijek	Rings	(Russia) Aleksandr Balandin	(Russia) Denis Ablyazin	(Italy) Matteo Angioletti
Osijek	Vault	(Canada) Nathan Gafuik	(Russia) Denis Ablyazin	(Germany) Michael Sawatzky
Osijek	Parallel bars	(Slovenia) Mitja Petkovšek	(Poland) Roman Kulesza	(Poland) Adam Kierzkowski
Osijek	Horizontal bar	(Croatia) Marijo Možnik	(Canada) Nathan Gafuik	(Canada) Jackson Payne
Stuttgart	Floor exercise	(Israel) Alexander Shatilov	(United Kingdom) Daniel Purvis	(Chile) Tomás González
Stuttgart	Floor exercise	(Israel) Alexander Shatilov	(United Kingdom) Daniel Purvis	(Greece) Eleftherios Kosmidis
Stuttgart	Pommel horse	(Hungary) Krisztián Berki	(Croatia) Robert Seligman	(Belgium) Donna-Donny Truyens
Stuttgart	Rings	(Russia) Aleksandr Balandin	(Russia) Konstantin Pluzhnikov	(France) Danny Pinheiro Rodrigues
Stuttgart	Vault	(Romania) Marius Berbecar	(Netherlands) Jeffrey Wammes	(Ukraine) Andriy Isayev
Stuttgart	Parallel bars	(Slovenia) Mitja Petkovšek	(China) Wang Guanyin	(Germany) Philipp Boy
Stuttgart	Horizontal bar	(Germany) Philipp Boy	(France) Gaël Da Silva	None awarded
Stuttgart	Horizontal bar	(Germany) Philipp Boy	(Netherlands) Jeffrey Wammes	None awarded
Glasgow	Floor exercise	(Israel) Alexander Shatilov	(Chile) Tomás González	(Netherlands) Jeffrey Wammes
Glasgow	Pommel horse	(United Kingdom) Louis Smith	(Hungary) Krisztián Berki	(Slovenia) Sašo Bertoncelj
Glasgow	Rings	(Russia) Aleksandr Balandin	(China) Liao Junlin	(Russia) Konstantin Pluzhnikov
Glasgow	Vault	(Chile) Tomás González	(United Kingdom) Theo Seager	(Netherlands) Jeffrey Wammes
Glasgow	Parallel bars	(Slovenia) Mitja Petkovšek	(Romania) Marius Berbecar	(France) Hamilton Sabot
Glasgow	Horizontal bar	(Croatia) Marijo Možnik	(Netherlands) Jeffrey Wammes	None awarded
Glasgow	Horizontal bar	(Croatia) Marijo Možnik	(Ukraine) Nikolai Kuksenkov	None awarded

=== Women ===
Competition	Event	Gold	Silver	Bronze
Montreal	Not held			
Cottbus	Vault	(Germany) Oksana Chusovitina	(Canada) Kristina Vaculik	(Hungary) Renata Toth
Cottbus	Uneven bars	(Canada) Kristina Vaculik	(Canada) Anysia Unick	(Germany) Marie-Sophie Hindermann
Cottbus	Balance beam	(Russia) Tatiana Solovyeva	(Canada) Kristina Vaculik	(Greece) Vasiliki Millousi
Cottbus	Floor exercise	(Canada) Kristina Vaculik	None awarded	(Switzerland) Jessica Diacci
Cottbus	Floor exercise	(Poland) Marta Pihan-Kulesza	None awarded	(Switzerland) Jessica Diacci
Doha	Vault	(South Africa) Jennifer Khwela	(Croatia) Tijana Tkalcek	(Hong Kong) Angel Wong
Doha	Uneven bars	(China) Huang Qiushuang	(China) Wu Liufang	(Canada) Bianca Dancose-Giambattisto
Doha	Balance beam	(China) Wu Liufang	(Croatia) Tina Erceg	(South Africa) Jennifer Khwela
Doha	Floor exercise	(China) Wu Liufang	(China) Huang Qiushuang	(Turkey) Göksu Üçtaş
Paris	Vault	(France) Youna Dufournet	(China) Jiang Tong	(Belarus) Nastassia Zaitsava
Paris	Uneven bars	(China) He Kexin	(United Kingdom) Elizabeth Tweddle	(France) Youna Dufournet
Paris	Balance beam	(China) Wu Liufang	(Russia) Aliya Mustafina	(Greece) Vasiliki Millousi
Paris	Floor exercise	(United Kingdom) Elizabeth Tweddle	(Russia) Ramilya Musina	(France) Marine Brevet
Maribor	Vault	(Slovenia) Teja Belak	(Netherlands) Mayra Kroonen	(Czech Republic) Jana Šikulová
Maribor	Uneven bars	(Czech Republic) Jana Šikulová	(Netherlands) Mayra Kroonen	(Netherlands) Marlies Ryken
Maribor	Balance beam	(Netherlands) Marlies Ryken	(Hungary) Renata Toth	(Netherlands) Mayra Kroonen
Maribor	Floor exercise	(Netherlands) Mayra Kroonen	(Hungary) Tunde Csillag	(Czech Republic) Jana Šikulová
Moscow	Vault	(North Korea) Hong Un-jong	(Germany) Oksana Chusovitina	(Russia) Tatiana Nabieva
Moscow	Uneven bars	(Russia) Tatiana Nabieva	(Venezuela) Jessica López	(Netherlands) Mayra Kroonen
Moscow	Balance beam	(Uzbekistan) Luiza Galiulina	(North Korea) Kim Un-hyang	(Germany) Oksana Chusovitina
Moscow	Balance beam	(Uzbekistan) Luiza Galiulina	(North Korea) Kim Un-hyang	(Russia) Ksenia Afanasyeva
Moscow	Floor exercise	(Russia) Ekaterina Kurbatova	(Russia) Ramilya Musina	(Netherlands) Mayra Kroonen
Porto	Vault	(Brazil) Daniele Hypólito	(Vietnam) Phan Thị Hà Thanh	(Venezuela) Jessica López
Porto	Uneven bars	(Venezuela) Jessica López	(Colombia) Nathalia Sánchez	(United Kingdom) Laura Edwards
Porto	Balance beam	(Colombia) Nathalia Sánchez	(Vietnam) Phan Thị Hà Thanh	(Venezuela) Jessica López
Porto	Floor exercise	(Brazil) Daniele Hypólito	None awarded	(United Kingdom) Hannah Whelan
Porto	Floor exercise	(Venezuela) Jessica López	None awarded	(United Kingdom) Hannah Whelan
Ghent	Vault	(Colombia) Jessica Gil Ortiz	(Romania) Diana Chelaru	(Hong Kong) Angel Wong
Ghent	Uneven bars	(China) Wu Liufang	(Romania) Ana Porgras	(Venezuela) Jessica López
Ghent	Balance beam	(Romania) Ana Porgras	(China) Yang Yilin	(China) Wu Liufang
Ghent	Floor exercise	(Romania) Sandra Izbașa	(Belgium) Julie Croket	(Israel) Roni Rabinovitz
Ostrava	Vault	(Croatia) Tijana Tkalcek	(Turkey) Göksu Üçtaş	(Slovenia) Tjaša Kysselef
Ostrava	Uneven bars	(Czech Republic) Jana Šikulová	None awarded	(Slovakia) Mária Homolová
Ostrava	Uneven bars	(Greece) Vasiliki Millousi	None awarded	(Slovakia) Mária Homolová
Ostrava	Balance beam	(Greece) Vasiliki Millousi	(Turkey) Göksu Üçtaş	(Slovakia) Mária Homolová
Ostrava	Floor exercise	(Turkey) Göksu Üçtaş	(Greece) Vasiliki Millousi	(Slovakia) Mária Homolová
Osijek	Vault	(Poland) Paula Plichta	(Poland) Gabriela Janik	(Croatia) Tijana Tkalcek
Osijek	Uneven bars	(Czech Republic) Jana Šikulová	(Austria) Barbara Gasser	(Netherlands) Marlies Ryken
Osijek	Balance beam	(Netherlands) Marlies Ryken	(Poland) Paula Plichta	(Czech Republic) Jana Šikulová
Osijek	Floor exercise	(Netherlands) Marlies Ryken	(Croatia) Tina Erceg	(Czech Republic) Jana Šikulová
Stuttgart	Vault	(United Kingdom) Imogen Cairns	(South Africa) Jennifer Khwela	(Chile) Makarena Pinto
Stuttgart	Uneven bars	(Australia) Lauren Mitchell	(Germany) Anja Brinker	(Russia) Anna Dementyeva
Stuttgart	Balance beam	(Australia) Lauren Mitchell	(Ukraine) Anastasiia Koval	(Russia) Anna Dementyeva
Stuttgart	Floor exercise	(Australia) Lauren Mitchell	(Russia) Anna Dementyeva	(Germany) Elisabeth Seitz
Glasgow	Vault	(Russia) Ekaterina Kurbatova	(United Kingdom) Imogen Cairns	(Chile) Makarena Pinto
Glasgow	Uneven bars	(China) Wu Liufang	(Venezuela) Jessica López	(Australia) Lauren Mitchell
Glasgow	Balance beam	(Australia) Lauren Mitchell	(United Kingdom) Hannah Whelan	(Venezuela) Jessica López
Glasgow	Floor exercise	(Australia) Lauren Mitchell	(Poland) Marta Pihan-Kulesza	(United Kingdom) Jennifer Pinches

== See also ==
- 2010 FIG Rhythmic Gymnastics World Cup series
