= Anne Kuhm =

French artistic gymnast

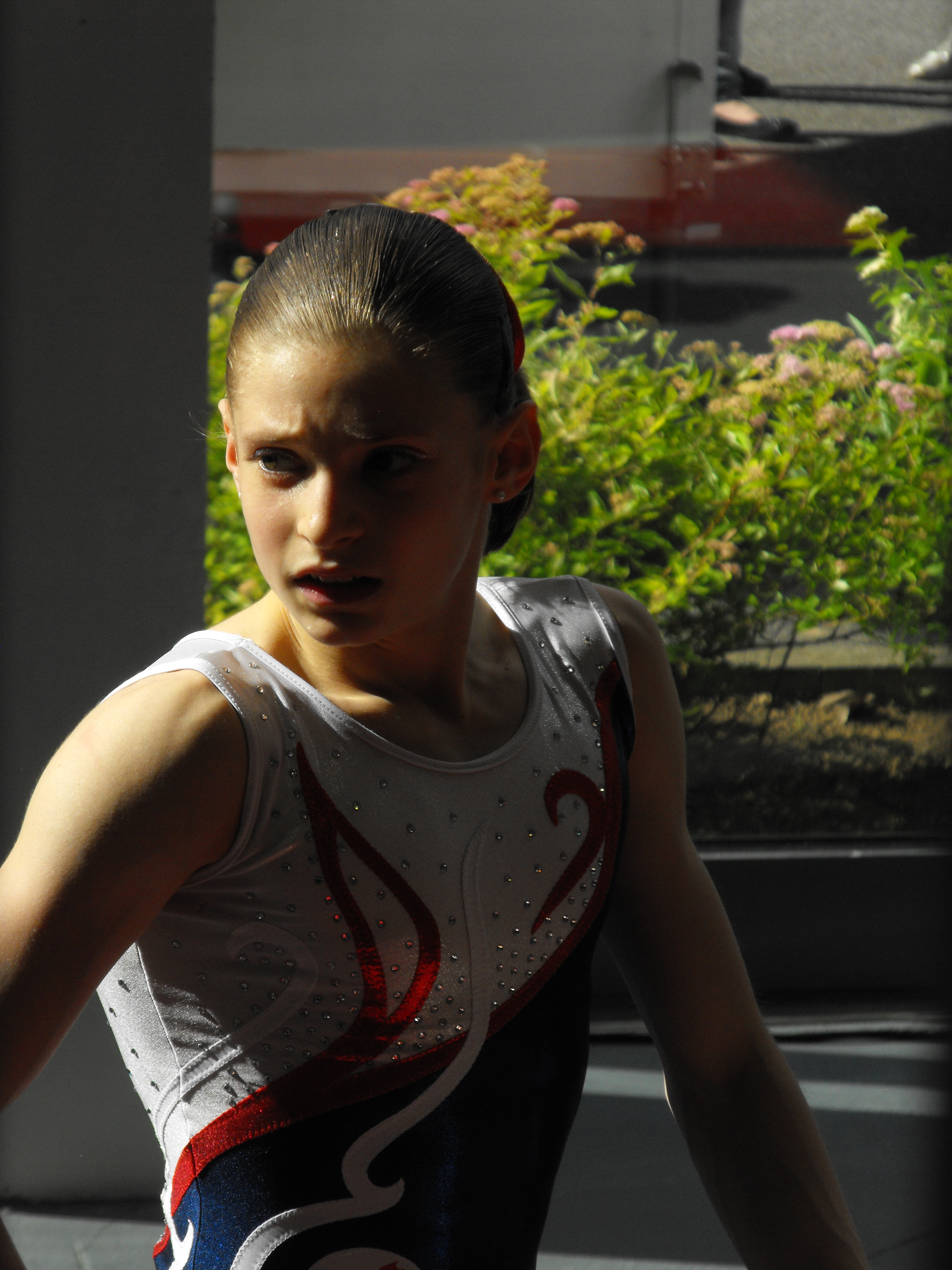
- Kuhm in 2012 at a competition in Haguenau.

Personal information
- Nickname: Nanou
- Born: December 17, 1996 (age 29) Haguenau, France
- Height: 1.46 m (4 ft 9 in)

Gymnastics career
- Discipline: Women's artistic gymnastics
- Country represented: France (2009 - 2017)
- College team: Arizona State Sun Devils
- Club: Elan Gymnique Rouennais
- Head coaches: Nellu Pop, Veronique Legras, Jianfu Ma, and Hong Ma Wang

Anne Kuhm (born December 17, 1996) is a French artistic gymnast. She represented France at the 2012 Summer Olympics, and was a reserve for the all-around final. The French team finished 11th in the qualification round, and they did not qualify into the team final. She is a 2-time national all-around champion (2011 and 2012).

She is currently attending Arizona State University where she is a member of their gymnastics team.

== Early life ==
Anne Kuhm was born on 17 December 1996 in Haguenau. She began gymnastics in 2002 when she was six years old. She trained in Brumath with coach Aude Haushalter and then with Marie-Laure Bernier who took over in 2004. In 2006, at the age of 10, she joined the training center in Haguenau where she was coached by Jany and Frank Kistler. She moved away from her parents in 2008 to train in Dijon under coaches Dominique Aubry, Jian Fu Ma and Hong Wang. She became a member of the French National Gymnastics Team in 2009.

== Junior career ==
=== 2010 ===
Kuhm was only 13 years old when she competed at the European Junior Championships in Birmingham where she finished fourth with the team and sixth in the all-around. A few months later, she was the runner-up at the French Junior National Championships in Albertville. Because of her remarkable performances, in July 2010, she joined INSEP in Paris with new coaches Eric and Cécile Demay.

=== 2011 ===
In February, Kuhm left to temporarily train at the World Olympic Gymnastics Academy in Texas. At the end of her trip, she participated in the WOGA Classic and finished seventh among the juniors and took gold in the team event. In May, Kuhm was crowned Junior French Champion in the all-around and runner-up on uneven bars. She also won the Second Division National Championships with her team from Haguenau. In July, she represented France at the European Youth Olympic Festival in Turkey. She finished fifth in the team competition, sixth in the all-around, fourth on uneven bars and fourth on beam. In November, Kuhm won the team silver medal at the Elite Gym Massilia competition. A month later, she won the National Cup in Bourges and qualified for the Olympic Test Event team.

== Senior career ==
=== 2012 ===
In March, Kuhm competed at the Cottbus World Cup and finished fifth on floor exercise. In June in Nantes, Kuhm was crowned Senior French Champion in the all-around and on beam and vault, and she was the runner-up on floor and uneven bars. This qualified her to represent France at the 2012 Summer Olympics.

In the qualification round, the French team finished eleventh and thus did not qualify for the team final. With an all-around score of 54.098, Kuhm was the first reserve for the all-around final.

=== 2013 ===
Kuhm changed clubs and joined the Elan Gymnique Rouennais where she stayed for the rest of her elite career. She had to withdraw from the National Championships due to an elbow injury. Kuhm made her return to competition in November at the Elite Gym Massilia in Marseille where she placed fourth in the team event. A few days later she won the French National Cup with a score of 55.000.

=== 2014 ===
Kuhm injured her collarbone at the beginning of the year, but she still competed in the French Championships where she won a gold medal on the floor and in the team event. However, due to her injury, she withdrew from the European Championships. In June, Anne Kuhm obtained her BAC ES (social sciences) with honors and entered the University of Paris Dauphine.

=== 2015 ===
Kuhm won the all-around at the French University Championships, she also finished sixth in the elite French National Championships. She then competed in the City of Jesolo Trophy in Italy where she finished fourth in team and seventh on the floor. Kuhm participated in the Flanders International Challenge in Belgium where France finished fourth. She then competed at the European Games in Baku where France placed fourth as a team and Kuhm will finished tenth on beam.

== NCAA career ==
In 2018, Anne Kuhm went to study in the United States and competed with the Arizona State University Sun Devils. After completing her bachelor's degree in 2019, Anne Kuhm retired from gymnastics.
