= Valentina Domenig-Ozimic =

Austrian rhythmic gymnast (born 2005)

- Born: 10 March 2005 (age 21) Graz, Austria

Gymnastics career
- Discipline: Rhythmic gymnastics
- Country represented: Austria; (2019-)
- Club: Allgemeiner Turnverein Graz
- Head coach: Luchia Egermann

Valentina Domenig-Ozimic (born 10 March 2005) is an Austrian rhythmic gymnast. She represents her country in international competitions.

== Personal life ==
Valentina took up gymnastics at age six, she now trains at the national gymnastics centre in Vienna. Her dream is to compete at the Olympic Games. She studied at the European class at the Ursulines' private high school in Graz.

== Career ==
Domenig-Ozimic debuted at the 2019 Junior World Championships in Moscow, where she ended 28th in teams,42nd with clubs final and 33rd with ribbon.

In 2021 she became a senior, at the World Cup in Sofia she was 52nd in the All-Around, 54th with hoop, 46th with ball, 52nd with clubs and 52nd with ribbon. In May she competed in Pesaro, ending 37th in the All-Around, 37th with hoop, 34th with ball, 32nd with clubs and 39th with ribbon. Valentina was then selected for the European Championships in Varna along Nicol Ruprecht, she was 54th in the All-Around, 54th with hoop, 54th with ball, 60th with clubs and 64th with ribbon. She also participated in the World Championships in Kitakyushu, ending 53rd in the All-Around, 51st with hoop, 59th with ball, 48th with clubs and 61st with ribbon.

The 2022 season started at the World Cup in Pesaro, she was 37th in the All-Around, 37th with hoop, 34th with ball, 32nd with clubs and 39th with ribbon. She then took part in the European Championships in Tel Aviv, taking 51st place in the All-Around, 49th with hoop, 46th with ball, 58th with clubs and 62nd with ribbon. In September Valentina competed at the World Championships in Sofia, finishing 54th in the All-Around, 57th with hoop, 53rd with ball, 51st with clubs and 64th with ribbon.
