= Riselda Selaj =

Albanian gymnast

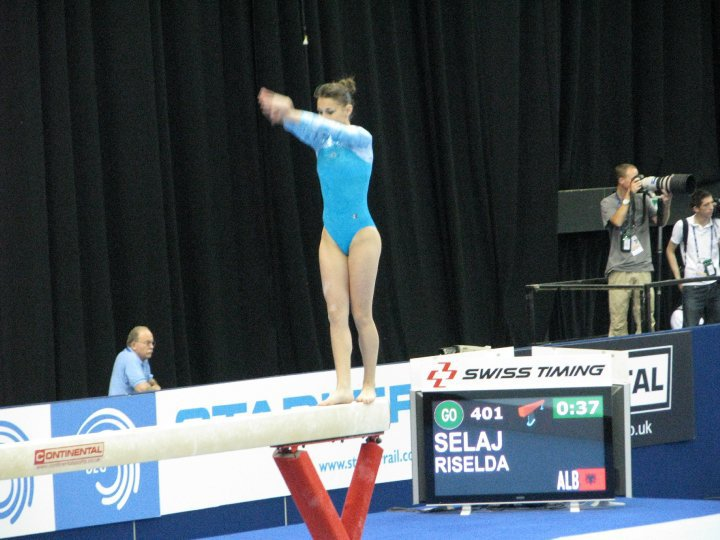
- Selaj at the 2010 European Women's Artistic Gymnastics Championships

Personal information
- Born: 7 April 1993 (age 32)
- Height: 5 ft 6.54 in (169 cm)

Gymnastics career
- Discipline: Women's artistic gymnastics
- Country represented: Albania
- Club: Klubi Sportiv Partizani
- Retired: 2014

Riselda Selaj is a former elite artistic gymnast from Albania. She is an International Champion, Olympic Competitor and All-around, Beam and Vault Balkan Champion. She is the first Albanian gymnast to win Five gold medals at an international competition and the first gymnast to win Five medals in the same international competition twice in a row.

== Career ==
She has won five medals, two gold medals, two silver medals and one bronze at Bitola International Competition, in 2006, where she also won a team bronze medal.

In 2007 she has won three medals two gold and one silver at the international artistic gymnastics tournament.

In 2008 she won 5 gold medals at the same international tournament, in all-around, beam, floor, vault and uneven bars and a team bronze medal.

In 2009 she won the all-around, beam and vault Balkan Championship in North Macedonia.

Selaj became a member of the Albanian senior team in 2008. She is a Nine time Albania all-around Champion, winning five as a junior and four as a senior.

Selaj participated in the World Artistic Gymnastics Championship 2009, in London, holding the National record for the best beam, floor and all-around finish by an Albanian gymnast in an Artistic Gymnastics World Championship.

She was also part of the Albanian team during the Mediterranean Games in Italy, where she was qualified in all-around final ranking at 13th place and ranking at 6th place at vault finals. Another national record in the history of Artistic Gymnastics of Albania.

Selaj competed at European Championships and at the European Youth Olympic Festival (EYOF).

Selaj announced her retirement from Albanian gymnastics federation in October 2014.
