= Laura Švilpaitė =

Lithuanian artistic gymnast (born 1994)

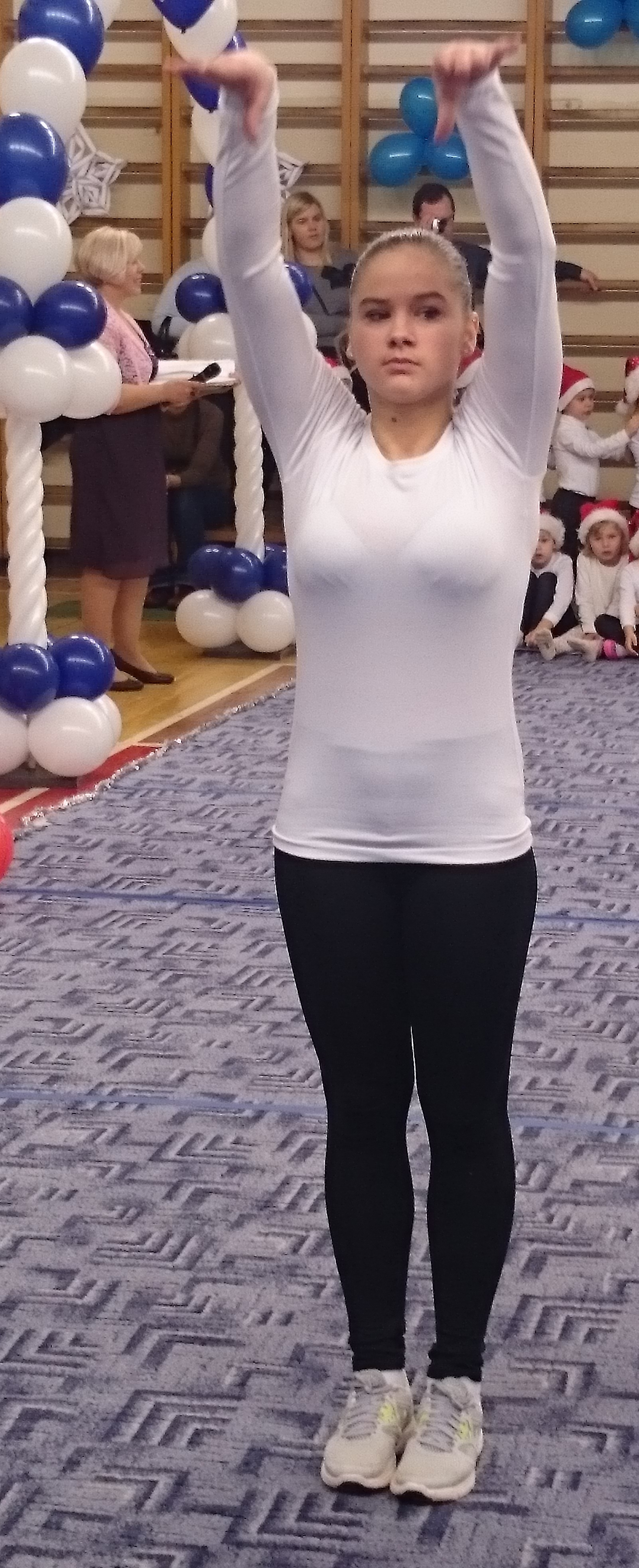
- Švilpaitė in 2015

Personal information
- Born: 7 January 1994 (age 32) Vilnius, Lithuania
- Height: 154 cm (5 ft 1 in)

Gymnastics career
- Discipline: Women's artistic gymnastics
- Country represented: Lithuania
- Head coach: Vasilij Gavrin
- Assistant coach: Irina Katinienė

Laura Švilpaitė (born 7 January 1994) is a Lithuanian artistic gymnast. She represented Lithuania at the 2012 Summer Olympics.

== Career ==
Švilpaitė competed at the 2008 Junior European Championships and finished 29th in the all-around. She won the junior all-around competition at the 2009 WOGA Classic by 0.050 points ahead of Grace McLaughlin. At the 2009 European Youth Olympic Festival, she finished eighth in the all-around final. She also qualified for the uneven bars and balance beam finals, finishing seventh and fourth, respectively.

Švilpaitė competed at her first World Championships in 2010 and finished 44th in the all-around during the qualification round. In 2011, she missed a month of training due to an illness and withdrew from the 2011 European Championships. She then only finished 125th in the all-around qualifications at the 2011 World Championships.

Švilpaitė competing on the floor exercise at the 2013 World Championships

Švilpaitė competed at the 2012 Olympic Test Event and finished 56th in the all-around, earning a berth for the 2012 Summer Olympics. She then competed at the 2012 Osijek World Challenge Cup but did not advance into any of the event finals. At the 2012 European Championships, she finished 34th in the all-around. Then at the Olympic Games, she finished 50th in the all-around during the qualification round with a total score of 50.299.

Švilpaitė only competed on the uneven bars and the balance beam at the 2013 European Championships and did not advance to either final. Then at the 2013 Scherbo Cup, she won a bronze medal on the balance beam. She competed on the vault, balance beam, and floor exercise at the 2013 World Championships and did not advance into any of the event finals.

Švilpaitė won the all-around title at the 2014 Salamunov Memorial in Ruše, Slovenia.
