= Caroline Weber (gymnast) =

Austrian rhythmic gymnast

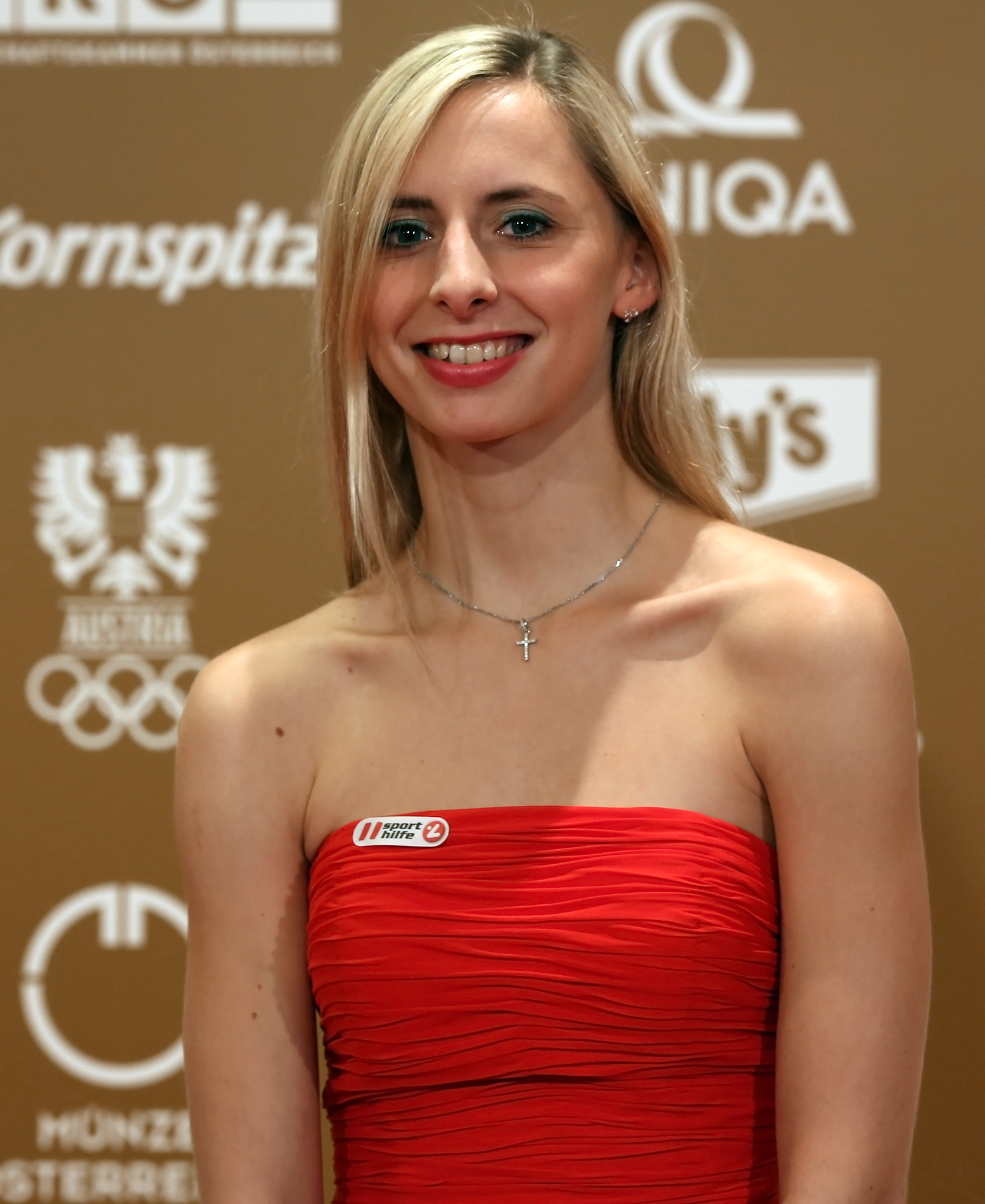
- Weber in 2013

Personal information
- Nickname: Caro
- Born: May 31, 1986 (age 40) Dornbirn, Austria
- Height: 167 cm (5 ft 6 in)

Gymnastics career
- Discipline: Rhythmic gymnastics
- Country represented: Austria
- Club: TS Dornbirn
- Head coach: Lucia Egermann
- Retired: 2013

Caroline Weber (born 31 May 1986) is an Austrian retired rhythmic gymnast. She represented Austria at the 2008 and 2012 Summer Olympics.

== Career ==
Weber competed at the 2005 World Championships and finished 36th in the all-around during the qualification round. She joined the Austrian Armed Forces in 2006 and began training at the Army High Performance Sports Center. She qualified for the all-around final at the 2007 World Championships, finishing 14th and earning a berth for the 2008 Summer Olympics. This marked the first time an Austrian rhythmic gymnast advanced to the World Championships all-around final.

Weber finished 12th in the all-around competition at the 2008 European Championships. She then competed at the 2008 Summer Olympics in Beijing, China, and she placed 17th in qualifications and did not advance to the finals.

Weber won a bronze medal in the hoop final at the 2009 Bourgas Grand Prix behind Daria Kondakova and Irina Risenzon. She then finished 18th in the all-around final at the 2009 World Championships and helped Austria finish 14th in the team competition. She then finished ninth in the all-around at the 2010 European Championships. At the 2010 World Championships, she once again qualified for the all-around final and finished 15th.

Weber qualified for the ribbon final at the 2011 European Championships and finished eighth, and she finished sixth in the team competition alongside Nicol Ruprecht. She then finished 15th in the all-around final at the 2011 World Championships and qualified for the 2012 Summer Olympics.

Weber placed 11th in the all-around at the 2012 European Championships. She then competed in the individual all-around event at the 2012 Summer Olympics, where she placed 18th in qualifications.

Weber competed at the 2013 European Championships in a home crowd in Vienna. She announced prior to the competition that she would be retiring after. She qualified for the clubs final and finished eighth, and she helped Austria finish seventh in the team competition.
