= Ana María Izurieta =

Spanish artistic gymnast (born 1993)

- Born: 13 January 1993 (age 33) Guayaquil, Ecuador

Gymnastics career
- Country represented: Spain
- Gym: Cantos Alcorcón- Madrid
- Head coach: Jesus Carballo

Ana María Izurieta (born 13 January 1993) is an artistic gymnast. Born in Ecuador, she represents Spain internationally.

== 2009 ==
At the 2009 Glasgow World Cup in Glasgow, Scotland, Izurieta tied for the gold medal on balance beam and earned the bronze on floor exercise.

Izurieta placed 4th in the women's individual all-around event at the 2009 European Artistic Gymnastics Championships in Milan in April 2009. She also tied for fourth on floor exercise.

She was unable to take part in the all-around competition of the 2009 World Artistic Gymnastics Championships in London owing to injury, despite having qualified in eleventh place in the 2009 World Artistic Gymnastics Championships – Women's qualification in October 2009.

== 2010 ==
At the 35th Memorial Joaquin Blume competition in June, Izurieta won the all-around (56.25).

She also captured the all-around title at the 2010 Spanish National Championships.

At October's 2010 World Championships in Rotterdam, the Netherlands, Izurieta injured her left ankle during the vault competition.

== 2011 ==
In May 2011, Izurieta and Spanish gymnast Beatriz Cuesta tied for the all-around title at the Spanish Cup in Madrid. Izurieta also placed first on balance beam (14.55/5.5) and second on uneven parallel bars (14.35/5.6).

At the 2011 Spanish National Championships in Seville during July, Izurieta recaptured the all-around title, with a total score of 56.417. She placed first on bars (13.80), beam (14.55) and floor (13.90), and she placed second on vault (14.167).

In an August series of meets leading up to October's 2011 World Championships, Izurieta placed second on balance beam at a Great Britain-Spain-Portugal matchup in Ipswich, England. Izurieta then won the all-around (55.35) in a dual meet between Spain and France that was held in Madrid, Spain.

In a September meet against Italy, Izurieta won balance beam (14.65) and placed second all-around (56.45) to 2006 world champion Vanessa Ferrari (56.60). In a dual meet against the Netherlands, Izurieta won floor exercise (13.75) and placed third all-around (55.10).

During the preliminary round of the 2011 World Championships in Tokyo, Japan, Izurieta placed 26th all-around (54.698), which qualified her to the all-around final when several gymnasts were eliminated due to the "two per country" rule for competition finals. The skills Izurieta performed in prelims included a Gienger and a double layout dismount on bars (13.833), a side somi and a two-and-a-half dismount on beam (13.166), and a tucked full in and a triple twist on floor (13.266).

In the women's all-around final, Izurieta placed 22nd (53.731). She scored 13.966 on vault, 13.466 on bars, 12.933 on beam and 13.366 on floor. Izurieta's floor exercise included a tucked full in, a triple twist, a 1 1/2 to double twist and a 2 1/2 twist.
