= Nicol Ruprecht =

Austrian rhythmic gymnast

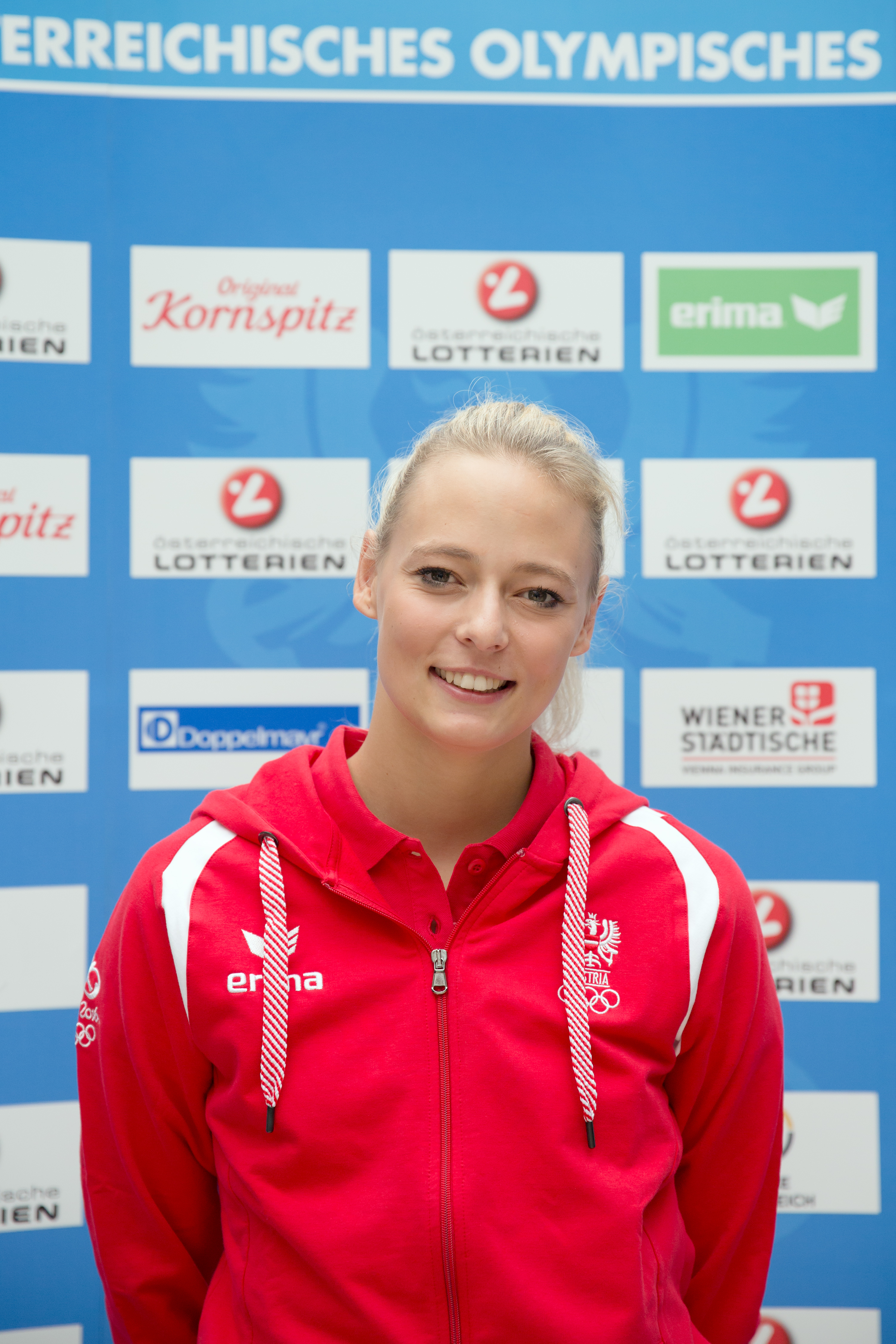
- Ruprecht in 2016

Personal information
- Nickname: Nici
- Born: October 2, 1992 (age 34) Innsbruck, Austria
- Height: 170 cm (5 ft 7 in)

Gymnastics career
- Discipline: Rhythmic gymnastics
- Country represented: Austria; (2010-2021)
- Club: VRG Worgl
- Head coach: Lucia Egermann
- Assistant coach: Petr Koudela
- Retired: yes
- World ranking: 29 WC 36 WCC (2017 Season); 31 (2016 Season); 24 (2015 Season)
Medal record
Representing Austria
Rhythmic Gymnastics
Grand Prix Final
| Bronze medal – third place | 2012 Brno | Ball |
| Bronze medal – third place | 2012 Brno | Clubs |
| Bronze medal – third place | 2014 Innsbruck | Hoop |

Nicol Ruprecht (born 2 October 1992) is an Austrian individual rhythmic gymnast. She is Austria's most successful rhythmic gymnast.

== Personal life ==
Ruprecht was born in Innsbruck. Her younger sister, Anna Ruprecht is also a rhythmic gymnast.

== Career ==
Ruprecht began rhythmic gymnastics in 2001 and has competed in numerous World Cup and Grand Prix series.

She competed in her first Worlds as member of the Austrian Team at the 2010 World Championships in Moscow and the following year at the 2011 World Championships in Montpellier. She competed in the London test event finishing 24th in all-around, she did not qualify to the 2012 London Olympics. She competed at the 2012 Grand Prix Final in Brno where she won bronze in ball and clubs; becoming the first Austrian rhythmic gymnast to win a medal at the Grand Prix Final.

In 2013, following the retirement of Caroline Weber, Ruprecht became the No.1 Austrian rhythmic gymnast. She finished 41st in All-around qualifications at the 2013 World Championships in Kyiv and 26th in All-around qualifications at the 2014 World Championships. Ruprecht finished 12th in the all-around at the 2014 European Championships behind Varvara Filiou. She competed at the 2014 Grand Prix Final in Innsbruck, she finished 5th in all-around and a bronze in hoop.

Ruprecht finished 11th in the all-around at the inaugural 2015 European Games ahead of Bulgarian Neviana Vladinova. She qualified in her first All-around Finals at the 2015 World Championships finishing 18th overall. On October 2–4, Ruprecht competed at the 2015 Aeon Cup in Tokyo Japan finishing 7th in the individual all-around finals with a total of 69.366 points.

In 2016 Season, Ruprecht began competing at the 2016 Moscow Grand Prix finishing 9th in the all-around with a total of 69.016 points and qualified to 2 apparatus finals. On March 12–13, Ruprecht competed at the MTM Tournament in Ljubljana, Slovenia finishing 5th in the all-around with a total of 70.300 points, in the apparatus finals; she won bronze ball and clubs. At the 30th Thiais Grand Prix event in Paris, she finished 11th in the all-around with a total of 70.617 points. On April 1–3, she finished 11th at the 2016 Pesaro World Cup with a total of 70.400 points. On April 21–22, Ruprecht won an Olympics license by finishing second amongst a top 8 selection of highest score for non qualified gymnasts at the 2016 Gymnastics Olympic Test Event held in Rio de Janeiro. On May 6–8, Ruprecht competed at the Brno Grand Prix finishing 7th in the all-around with a total of 70.550 points and qualified to all 4 apparatus finals. On July 1–3, Ruprecht competed at the 2016 Berlin World Cup finishing 11th in the all-around. On August 19–20, Ruprecht competed at the 2016 Summer Olympics held in Rio de Janeiro, Brazil. She finished 20th in the rhythmic gymnastics individual all-around qualifications and did not advance into the top 10 finals.

In 2017 Season, Ruprecht competed at the 2017 Grand Prix Moscow finishing 9th in the all-around and qualified to all the 4 apparatus finals. On April 7–9, Ruprecht competed at the 2017 Pesaro World Cup finishing 14th in the all-around. On May 5–7, Ruprecht competed at the 2017 Sofia World Cup finishing 21st in the all-around. On July 7–9, Ruprecht finished 11th in the all-around at the 2017 Berlin World Challenge Cup, she qualified in hoop and clubs final. Ruprecht competed at the quadrennial held 2017 World Games in Wrocław, Poland from July 20–30, however she did not advance to any of the apparatus finals. On August 30 - September 3, at the 2017 World Championships in Pesaro, Italy; Ruprecht finished 23rd in the all-around finals.

In 2018, On March 24–25, Ruprecht finished 19th in the all-around at the 2018 Thiais Grand Prix. Ruprecht then competed at the 2018 Sofia World Cup finishing 14 in the all-around. On May 16–17, she competed at the 2018 Holon Grand Prix finishing 10th in the all-around, she qualified into the hoop final.

She finished 29th in All-around Qualifications at the 2021 European Championships in Varna, Bulgaria. Next day, she announced her retirement from competitive gymnastics on her Instagram profile.

== Routine music information ==
| Year | Apparatus | Music title |
|---|---|---|
| 2021 | Hoop | |
| 2021 | Ball | Ave Maria by Franz Schubert |
| 2021 | Clubs | In The Summertime by Mungo Jerry |
| 2021 | Ribbon | SexyBack by Justin Timberlake |
| 2020 | Hoop | Carmen: Prelude To Act 1 by Alain Lombard |
| 2020 | Ball | Moonlight Sonata by William Robinson |
| 2020 | Clubs | All that Jazz by Catherine Zeta-Jones & Renee Zellweger |
| 2020 | Ribbon | SexyBack by Justin Timberlake |
| 2019 | Hoop | Carmina Burana by Carl Orff |
| 2019 | Ball | Moonlight Sonata by William Robinson |
| 2019 | Clubs | All that Jazz by Catherine Zeta-Jones & Renee Zellweger |
| 2019 | Ribbon | In The Mood, The Boogie Bumper by Glenn Miller, Big Bad Voodoo Daddy |
| 2018 | Hoop | Carmina Burana by Carl Orff |
| 2018 | Ball | Cell Block Tango by John Kander |
| 2018 | Clubs | Mein Herr by Liza Minnelli |
| 2018 | Ribbon | In The Mood, The Boogie Bumper by Glenn Miller, Big Bad Voodoo Daddy |
| 2017 | Hoop | Carmina Burana by André Rieu |
| 2017 | Ball | Cell Block Tango music from Chicago! by John Kander |
| 2017 | Clubs | Carmen: Habanera by Georges Bizet |
| 2017 | Ribbon | La Cabane de Baba Yaga Sur des Pattes de Poule, Gnomus by Modest Petrovich Mussorgsky |
| 2016 | Hoop | Tango Jalousie by Barcelona Symphony Orchestra |
| 2016 | Ball | Summertime by The Smooth Ballroom Band |
| 2016 | Clubs | Carmen: Habanera by Vienna Symphony Orchestra |
| 2016 | Ribbon | Kiss by Prince |
| 2015 | Hoop | Take Five by Dave Brubeck |
| 2015 | Ball | Summertime by The Smooth Ballroom Band |
| 2015 | Clubs | Carmen: Habanera by Georges Bizet |
| 2015 | Ribbon | Let's Twist Again by Chubby Checker |
