= Moldir Azimbay =

Kazakhstani artistic gymnast (born 1995)

- Born: 2 December 1995 (age 30) Shymkent, Kazakhstan
- Height: 162 cm (5 ft 4 in)

Gymnastics career
- Discipline: Women's artistic gymnastics
- Country represented: Kazakhstan
- Head coach: Galina Dolgopolova

Moldir Azimbay (Мөлдір Жаңабайқызы Әзімбай, born 2 December 1995) is a Kazakhstani former artistic gymnast. She competed at the 2012 Summer Olympics and at the 2011 World Championships.

== Gymnastics career ==
Azimbay began artistic gymnastics in 2004 and was coached by Galina Dolgopolova for her entire career. She represented Kazakhstan at the 2010 Summer Youth Olympics and finished 24th in the all-around qualifications. She became age-eligible for senior international competitions in 2011. That year, she competed at the World Championships and placed 117th in the all-around qualifications.

At the 2012 Olympic Test Event, Azimbay finished 64th in the all-around. As one of the top 24 gymnasts not already qualified for the Olympics, she earned a berth to the 2012 Summer Olympics. She competed on the balance beam at the 2012 Cottbus World Challenge Cup but did not advance into the final.

Azimbay represented Kazakhstan at the 2012 Summer Olympics at 16 years old, making her the youngest athlete on Kazakhstan's Olympic team. She was also the first ethnic Kazakh to compete for Kazakhstan at the Olympics in women's artistic gymnastics. She placed 58th in the all-around qualifications and did not advance into any finals. After the Olympics, she competed simplified routines at the Kazakhstan Championships and won the all-around silver medal.

Azimbay competed on the balance beam at both the 2013 Doha and Ljubljana World Cups but did not advance to the final at either. She then competed on the vault and balance beam in the qualification round at the Anadia World Challenge Cup. This was the final international competition of her career.
