= Mária Homolová =

Slovak artistic gymnast (born 1987)

- Born: 29 September 1987 (age 38) Zvolen, Czechoslovakia
- Height: 161 cm (5 ft 3 in)

Gymnastics career
- Discipline: Women's artistic gymnastics
- Country represented: Slovakia (1997–2013)

Mária Homolová (born 29 September 1987) is a Slovak former artistic gymnast. She represented Slovakia at the 2012 Summer Olympics. She is the 2004, 2005, 2006, and 2011 Slovak national all-around champion.

== Early life ==
Homolová was born on 29 September 1987 in Zvolen. Her father and brother both played professional football. She began gymnastics at six years old after quitting figure skating.

== Career ==
Homolová won the junior Slovak national all-around titles in 2000, 2001, and 2003. She competed at her first World Championships in 2003 and finished 136th in the all-around during the qualification round. She did not qualify for the 2004 Summer Olympics. She finished 109th at the 2006 World Championships and 98th at the 2007 World Championships. She missed out on qualification for the 2008 Summer Olympics by 0.300 points.

Homolová tore her Achilles tendon in the lead up to the 2008 European Championships. At the 2010 Ostrava World Cup, she won bronze medals on the uneven bars, balance beam, and floor exercise. Then at the 2010 World Championships, she finished 79th in the all-around during the qualification round.

Homolová qualified for the all-around final at the 2011 Summer Universiade and finished 12th. Then at the 2011 World Championships, she finished 93rd in the all-around qualifications and advanced to the 2012 Olympic Test Event. There, she finished 62nd in the all-around and received a berth for the 2012 Summer Olympics. She competed at the 2012 Osijek World Challenge Cup and finished seventh in the balance beam final.

Homolová withdrew from the 2012 European Championships due to a torn tendon sheath. She recovered in time to return to training for the 2012 Summer Olympics. There, she finished 57th in the all-around during the qualification round.

Homolová competed at the 2013 Gym Festival Trnava and finished eighth in the all-around and uneven bars and sixth in the balance beam. She finished 36th in the all-around during the qualification round of the 2013 Summer Universiade.
