= Mayra Kroonen =

Dutch artistic gymnast (born 1988)

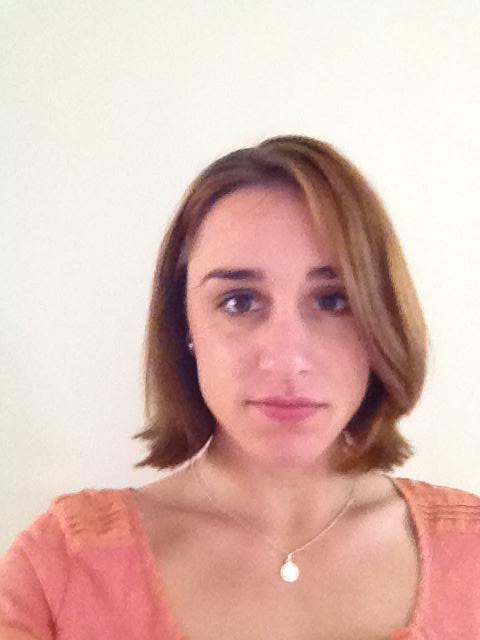
Mayra Kroonen

Mayra Kroonen (born 6 June 1988) is a former artistic gymnast. She competed at the 2009 World Artistic Gymnastics Championships.
