= Zoi Mafalda Marques de Lima =

Portuguese gymnast (born 1991)

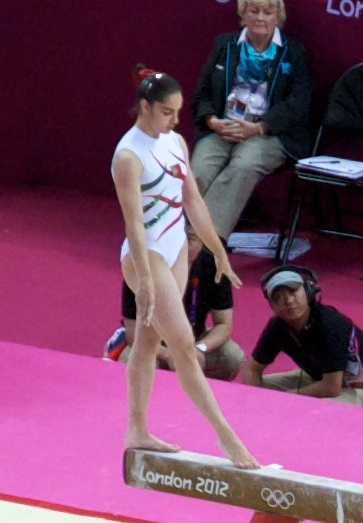
- Lima competing on the balance beam at the 2012 Summer Olympics

Personal information
- Full name: Zoi Mafalda Marques de Lima
- Born: 7 November 1991 (age 34) Toronto, Canada
- Height: 163 cm (5 ft 4 in)

Gymnastics career
- Discipline: Women's artistic gymnastics
- Country represented: Portugal
- Club: Sport Club do Porto
- Head coach: Cristina Gomes

Zoi Mafalda Marques de Lima (born 7 October 1991) is a Portuguese former artistic gymnast. She competed at the 2012 Summer Olympics. She also competed at five World Championships (2007, 2009, 2010, 2011 and 2014).

== Gymnastics career ==
Lima began gymnastics when she was six years old. She competed at the 2007 World Championships and finished 97th in the all-around qualification round.

Lima finished 62nd in the all-around during the qualification round of the 2009 World Championships. After the World Championships, she won a silver medal on the floor exercise at the 2009 Osijek World Cup behind China's Sui Lu.

Lima helped the Portuguese team finish 32nd in the qualification round of the 2010 World Championships. She finished 99th in the individual all-around qualifications at the 2011 World Championships.

Lima had surgery on her right elbow in January 2012. She recovered in time to compete at the 2012 Olympic Test Event, where she qualified for the 2012 Summer Olympics. She represented Portugal at the 2012 Summer Olympics and was the country's youngest Olympic team member. She finished 53rd in the all-around during the qualification round with a score of 49.631 after falling on the floor exercise.

Lima finished fifth on the floor exercise at the 2014 Anadia World Challenge Cup. She competed on the vault, balance beam, and floor exercise at the 2014 World Championships but did not advance to any finals. She finished eighth in the floor exercise final at the 2015 Anadia World Challenge Cup. Then at the 2015 Portuguese Championships, she won gold medals on the vault and floor exercise and a silver medal on the balance beam behind Ana Filipa Martins.
