= Nastassia Marachkouskaya =

Belarusian artistic gymnast (born 1990)

- Full name: Nastassia Iharauna Marachkouskaya
- Born: 19 September 1990 (age 35) Minsk
- Height: 164 cm (5 ft 5 in)

Gymnastics career
- Discipline: Women's artistic gymnastics
- Country represented: Belarus (2006–2012)
Medal record
Women's artistic gymnastics
Representing Belarus
FIG World Cup
Event	1st	2nd	3rd
World Challenge Cup	0	1	0

Nastassia Iharauna Marachkouskaya (Belarusian: Настасься Ігараўна Марачкоўская; Łacinka: Nastassia Maračkoŭskaja; born 19 September 1990) is a Belarusian former artistic gymnast. She competed at the 2008 and 2012 Summer Olympics and was a reserve for the vault final at both. She is a two-time European Championships vault finalist.

== Gymnastics career ==
Marachkouskaya competed at her first World Championships in 2006 and finished 82nd in the all-around qualifications, and the Belarusian team placed 24th. She advanced into the all-around final at the 2007 European Championships but withdrew midway through the final. She then finished 45th in the all-around qualifications at the 2007 World Championships. As one of the top nine athletes from a country that had not qualified through team placement, she earned a berth to the 2008 Summer Olympics.

Marachkouskaya advanced to the vault final at the 2008 European Championships and finished sixth. She then represented Belarus at the 2008 Summer Olympics and finished ninth in the vault qualifications, making her the first reserve for the vault final. Additionally, she placed 48th in the all-around qualifications.

Marachkouskaya competed with the Belarusian team that placed 25th at the 2010 World Championships. At the 2011 European Championships, she advanced into the vault final and finished eighth. She finished 40th in the all-around qualifications at the 2011 World Championships and qualified for the 2012 Olympic Test Event. There, she finished 65th in the all-around and received one of the final available Olympic berths.

At the 2012 Cottbus World Challenge Cup, Marachkouskaya won a silver medal on the vault behind Brittany Rogers. She then represented Belarus at the 2012 Summer Olympics and only competed on the vault and balance beam. She finished tenth in the vault qualifications, making her the second reserve for the final. These Olympics were the final competition of her career.
