= Jana Šikulová =

Czech artistic gymnast

- Born: 2 July 1988 (age 38) Brno, Czechoslovakia

Gymnastics career
- Discipline: Women's artistic gymnastics
- Country represented: Czech Republic
- Club: Sokol Brno I
- Head coaches: Stanislav Vyzina, Anita Vyzinová
- Retired: 2014
Medal record
Women's artistic gymnastics
Representing Czech Republic
European Championships
Silver medal – second place	2006 Volos	Uneven bars
FIG World Cup
Event	1st	2nd	3rd
Apparatus World Cup	7	2	8
World Challenge Cup	0	1	2
Total	7	3	10

Jana Šikulová (born 2 July 1988) is a Czech former artistic gymnast. She is the 2006 European Championships silver medalist on the uneven bars.

== Personal life ==
Šikulová was born in Brno on 2 July 1988. In August 2014, she graduated from the Faculty of Sports Studies of Masaryk University with a Master's degree. She wrote her diploma thesis about the Yurchenko vault.

== Career ==
Šikulová started gymnastics aged six and reached the top of the Czech gymnastics despite having a vision impairment in her left eye. She followed the steps of fellow Brno gymnast Jana Komrsková, being nicknamed "Small Jana" to distinct her from Komrsková.

Šikulová competed at her first World Championships in 2003 and finished 87th in the all-around qualifications. She won a bronze medal on the uneven bars at the 2004 Glasgow World Cup and a silver medal at the Stuttgart World Cup. At the 2006 European Championships, she won a silver medal on the uneven bars behind Beth Tweddle.

Šikulová won a gold medal on the uneven bars at the 2010 Maribor World Cup and bronze medals on the vault and floor exercise. She competed with the Czech team that finished 30th at the 2010 World Championships. She won a bronze medal on the uneven bars at the 2012 Osijek World Challenge Cup.

Šikulová competed at the 2013 La Roche-sur-Yon World Cup in France and won a bronze medal on the uneven bars. She then qualified for the all-around final at the 2013 European Championships and finished 20th. At the Ljubljana World Challenge Cup, she won a bronze medal on the uneven bars. She finished 14th in the all-around final at the 2013 Summer Universiade. She won the 2013 Sokol Grand Prix mixed pair competition together with Martin Konečný.

At the 2014 Doha World Challenge Cup, Šikulová won the uneven bars silver medal behind teammate Kristýna Pálešová. She also won the uneven bars silver medal at the Korea Cup. She then competed at the 2014 European Championships and placed 18th in the all-around. She retired from competition after the European Championships to work as a coach.
