= Lorena Quiñones =

Puerto Rican artistic gymnast

- Full name: Lorena Quiñones Moreno
- Born: 1996 (age 29–30) Humacao, Puerto Rico
- Height: 5 ft 0 in (152 cm)

Gymnastics career
- Discipline: Women's artistic gymnastics
- Country represented: Puerto Rico
- Retired: Yes

Lorena Quiñones (born 1996) is a Puerto Rican artistic gymnast who represented her country at the 2012 Summer Olympics, in London, England.

== Gymnastic career ==
Lorena Quiñones Moreno was born in Humacao, Puerto Rico in 1996. At the age of 15, and while still attending the Petra Mercado Bougart High School in Humacao, Puerto Rico, took part in the 2012 Gymnastics Olympic Test Event at The O2 Arena in London, England. This acted as one of the qualifiers for the Summer Olympics, which was to take place later that year in London.

She finished in 61st place in the women's artistic gymnastics, with a score of 49,298. This was sufficient to qualify Quiñones for the Olympics, making her the first female gymnast from Puerto Rico to do so. The only gymnasts to compete for the country were men previously, at the 2004 and 2008 Summer Games. Her score also broke the record for the highest score set by a female Puerto Rican gymnast. Upon her return, the Mayor of Humacao, Marcelo Trujillo, said that he was already discussing with the Puerto Rican Government to ensure that there is funding available to allow Quiñones' parents to attend the London Games with her.

Her parents travelled with her to the Games, where she competed but did not place on the podium. Her mother expressed the view that it was a learning experience, and that Quiñones was still young enough that she had two more Olympics yet in her.
