= Barbara Gasser =

Austrian artistic gymnast

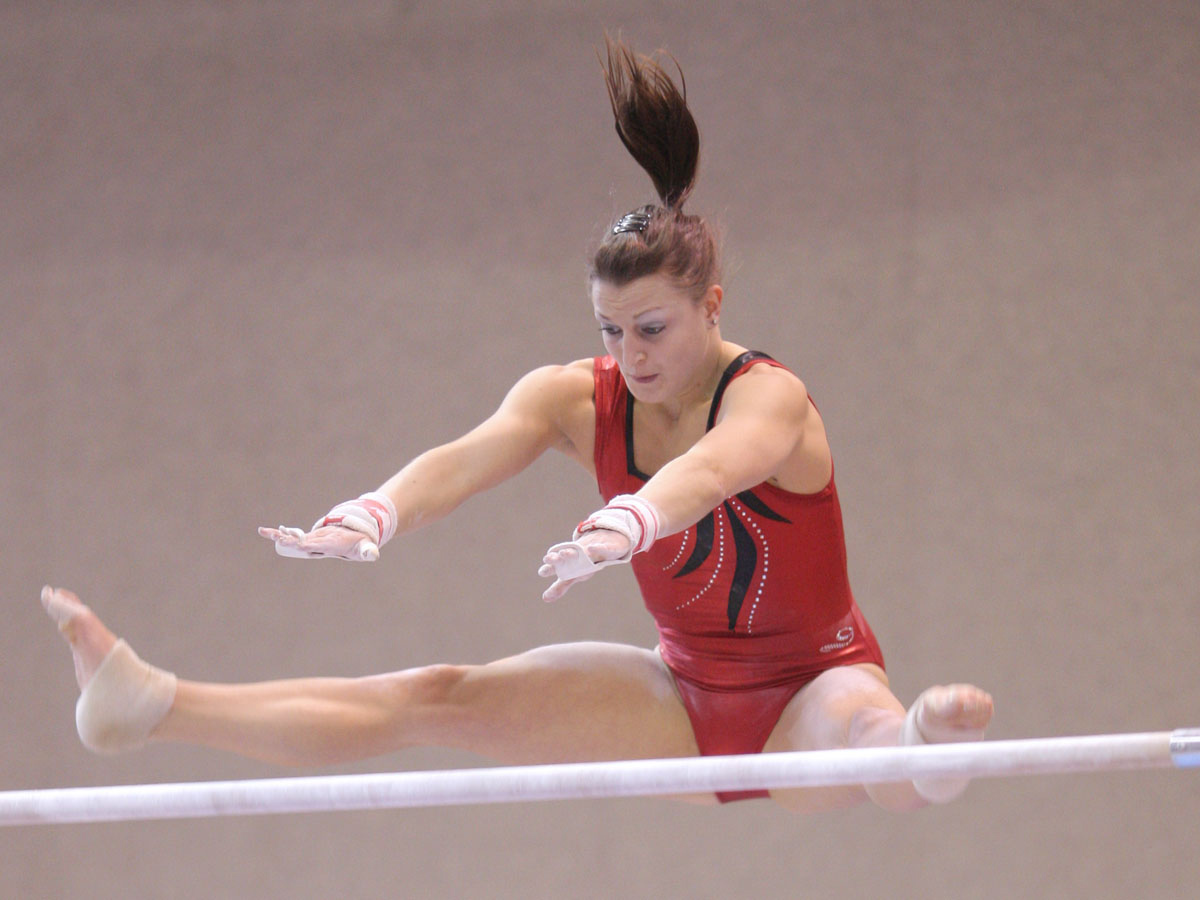

Personal information
- Nickname: Babsi
- Born: August 30, 1989 (age 37) Bregenz, Austria
- Height: 1.67 m (5 ft 6 in)

Gymnastics career
- Discipline: Women's artistic gymnastics
- Country represented: Austria
- Club: Bluewater Gymnastics
- Head coaches: Dave and Liz Brubaker

Barbara Gasser is an Austrian-Canadian former artistic gymnast. She represented Austria at the 2012 Summer Olympics. In 2012 she was the first Austrian Gymnast since 1964, 48 years, to qualify for artistic gymnastics at the Summer Olympics.

Gasser was an Artistic Gymnastics World Cup silver medal winner on the uneven bars in Osijek in 2010. She placed 7th and 11th in the overall World Cup ranking list on the uneven bars, in 2010 and 2011 respectively. Gasser is a 13-time Austrian national champion, and she has competed at 2 World Championships and 6 European Championships. She also competed in 2 World University Games and qualified for the finals.

Brought up in Lustenau, Gasser's family moved to Canada in 2003. After that she lived and trained in Sarnia, Ontario, but since she still had Austrian citizenship she continued to compete for Austria.

== Early gymnastics career ==
Gasser began training at the age of seven, originally in Lustenau. She qualified for the Vorarlberg regional team and began to train at the Vorarlberg Regional Gymnastics Training Centre in Dornbirn. Her trainer was Christine Frauenknecht. In 2010, Frauenknecht was named as the Austrian Junior Coach of the Year. Gasser won several junior gymnastics competitions, and was the junior regional champion in 2001. In 2002, she qualified to be part of the Austrian junior squad which competed in the European Junior Championships in Patras. In 2003, she was the Austrian Junior All-around champion. That year, she also won her first senior title, a regional title in the vault. That was also the year that her family moved to Canada.

== Move to Canada and early senior career ==
The family moved to Canada as her grandfather had lived there for many years. In Canada, she intensified her training, and trained twice a day at the Bluewater Gymnastics Club under trainers Dave and Liz Brubaker.

As she retained her Austrian citizenship, she continued to compete for Austria, travelling to compete in her old home country. She was part of the Austrian team at the European Youth Olympic festival in 2004.

Gasser finished high school in 2007.

In 2008, she won her first senior national all-around title, but many injuries followed. A knee reconstruction did not solve these problems and there followed further knee injuries, and associated ligament injuries. She made her comeback at the 2010 Austrian National Championships, where she won the all-around, the vault and the uneven bars.

== World Championships and Olympics ==
At the 2011 World Championships in Tokyo, Gasser's results earned the highest ranked Austrian gymnast a place at the 2012 Olympic Test Event. She was the highest ranked Austrian gymnast and competed at the Test Event where she achieved Olympic qualification. This was a historic success for an Austrian gymnast, as Gasser was the first female Austrian gymnast to qualify for an Olympic Games since Henriette Parzer (Behrendt) qualified for the 1964 Tokyo Olympics.

Gasser's strongest event is the uneven bars. It was on this apparatus that she won silver at the 2010 World Cup event in Osijek. In this event she finished in eleventh in the 2011 overall World Cup, improving to seventh in 2012.

At the 2012 Olympics, she was joined by another member of the Vorarlberg Gymnastics squad, Caroline Weber. During the qualification for the all-around and individual equipment finals at the 2012 Olympics, Gasser suffered a fall from the beam, and finished in 46th place, and did not qualify for any finals.
