= Tina Erceg =

Croatian artistic gymnast (born 1988)

- Full name: Tina Erceg
- Born: 3 May 1988 (age 38) Split, Croatia (then-SFRY)

Gymnastics career
- Discipline: Women's artistic gymnastics
- Country represented: Croatia
- Club: GK Marjan
- Head coaches: Magda Miloševic-Ilic, Miro Koncarevic, Željana Becic, Ivo Borozan
- Eponymous skills: Balance Beam
- Retired: 2012

Tina Erceg (born 3 May 1988) is a Croatian former international gymnast. The senior all-around National Champion in 2004 and 2005 and the winner of several medals on the World Cup circuit, Erceg is considered to be the Croatia's most successful international gymnast. She was also the first female gymnast ever to represent independent Croatia at the Olympic Games.

== Early life and junior career ==
Erceg was born in Split, Croatia (then the SFRY) to parents Slobodan and Anda. She began gymnastics in 1995 at Kaštela Gymnastics, with coach Magda Miloševic-Ilić. In 1998, she followed coach Miloševic-Ilić to a new club, GK Marjan. The following year, she placed first in the all-around in the youth division at the Croatian National Championships in Zagreb. In 2000, Erceg won gold medals on the vault, balance beam and uneven bars in the youth division of the Croatian Nationals, and earned a place on the Croatian national junior team. In 2002, Erceg competed at the junior European Championships, where she placed 12th in the all-around final.

== Senior career ==
Erceg entered the senior ranks in 2003. She placed 112th in the all-around at the 2003 World Championships and did not qualify for the 2004 Olympics, but continued training. In 2004, she placed 14th in the all-around at the European Championships. Erceg won her first major international medal at the 2005 Maribor World Cup, where she placed second on floor exercise. At the 2006 Maribor World Cup, Erceg won two additional medals, a silver on the uneven bars and a bronze on vault.

In 2007, Erceg competed in the World Championships in Stuttgart, where she placed 69th in the all-around in the preliminary round of competition, earning herself an individual berth to the 2008 Olympics in Beijing. She also competed at the 2007 World University Games, placing sixth on the floor in event finals.

In the spring of 2008 Erceg placed 16th in the all-around at the European Championships in Clermont-Ferrand. At the 2008 Olympics, she competed only in the team qualifying round, placing 13th on vault and 57th overall.

Erceg retired from competitive gymnastics in 2012.

== Post-gymnastics ==
After the London Olympics, Erceg obtained a M.Sc. degree in Kinesiology from the Faculty of Kinesiology in Split and worked as a coach in GK Marjan. After taking up CrossFit, Erceg switched to weightlifting and, after only several months of training, took individual gold and silver medals in the 2015 Croatian Championship.

== Skills ==
- Uneven bars: Comaneci salto; 1 1/2 piroutte-Jaeger combination; double-front dismount.
- Balance beam: 'Erceg' mount; front aerial-side flip; back handspring-layout; double twist dismount.
- Floor exercise: Triple twist; double pike.

=== Eponymous skill ===
Erceg has one eponymous skill listed in the Code of Points.

Apparatus	Name	Description	Difficulty (Note: Valid for the 2025–2028 Code of Points)
Balance beam	Erceg	Round-off at end of beam - take off backward with ½ turn (180°) tucked salto forward	G (0.7)
