= 2010 World Artistic Gymnastics Championships – Women's qualification =

== Team ==
In accordance with Olympic qualification procedure, the top 24 nations in team competition qualified to send a full team to the 2011 World Championships.

Team	Vault (gymnastics)		Uneven bars		Balance beam		Floor (gymnastics)		Total (All-around)	
Team	Score	Rank	Score	Rank	Score	Rank	Score	Rank	Score	Rank
Russia	60.099	2	58.500	2	59.057	2	56.865	2	234.521	1
Aliya Mustafina (RUS)	15.600	1	15.300	4	14.933	6	14.833	1	60.666	1
Tatiana Nabieva (RUS)	15.466	3	14.700	10	14.333	17	13.066	78	57.565	8
Ksenia Afanasyeva (RUS)	14.300	24	11.866	107	14.533	9	14.766	2	55.465	17
Anna Dementyeva (RUS)			14.200	17	15.133	3	14.200	12		
Ksenia Semenova (RUS)	14.066	32			14.458	13	12.566	116		
Ekaterina Kurbatova (RUS)	14.733	9	14.300	13						
China	57.799	4	61.615	1	58.299	3	56.065	4	233.778	2
Jiang Yuyuan (CHN)	14.733	11	15.200	5	14.333	16	13.833	25	58.099	4
Huang Qiushuang (CHN)	14.600	16	15.666	2	14.466	12	13.333	54	58.065	5
Yang Yilin (CHN)	14.566	17	14.683	11	0.000	188	13.666	31	42.915	141
Sui Lu (CHN)			13.633	38	14.400	15	14.633	4		
He Kexin (CHN)	0.000	185	16.066	1			13.933	19		
Deng Linlin (CHN)	13.900	46			15.100	4				
United States	60.398	1	58.299	3	59.164	1	55.782	5	233.643	3
Rebecca Bross (USA)	14.716	12	14.933	7	15.266	2	14.166	13	59.081	2
Aly Raisman (USA)	15.033	4	14.133	19	14.766	8	14.383	8	58.315	3
Mackenzie Caquatto (USA)	14.933	6	14.466	12	14.266	21	13.533	39	57.198	9
Mattie Larson (USA)	14.966	5	14.200	18	13.933	31	13.233	64	56.332	11
Alicia Sacramone (USA)	15.466	2			14.866	7				
Bridget Sloan (USA)			14.700	9			13.700	30		
Romania	57.899	3	56.099	5	56.999	5	57.498	1	228.495	4
Ana Porgras (ROU)	13.833	52	14.733	8	15.266	1	14.066	15	57.898	6
Raluca Haidu (ROU)	14.633	13	14.000	22	13.366	57	14.200	11	56.199	12
Sandra Izbașa (ROU)	14.833	8			14.333	18	14.766	3		
Diana Chelaru (ROU)	14.600	15	14.000	21			14.466	6		
Cerasela Pătrașcu (ROU)	13.733	67	13.300	48	14.000	28				
Gabriela Drăgoi (ROU)			13.366	45	13.400	53				
Great Britain	56.191	8	57.466	4	55.032	7	56.232	3	224.921	5
Hannah Whelan (GBR)	14.033	34	12.933	58	14.300	20	14.233	10	55.499	16
Nicole Hibbert (GBR)	13.933	41	14.000	23	13.433	52	13.200	66	54.566	28
Jennifer Pinches (GBR)	13.566	87	13.566	39	12.833	81	13.933	21	53.898	32
Becky Downie (GBR)	13.700	69	14.300	14	14.033	27				
Imogen Cairns (GBR)	14.525	19			13.266	62	14.066	16		
Beth Tweddle (GBR)			15.600	3			14.000	17		
Australia	56.798	5	55.557	7	57.098	4	55.332	6	224.785	6
Lauren Mitchell (AUS)	14.733	10	13.700	36	14.966	5	14.466	5	57.865	7
Georgia Bonora (AUS)	13.833	53	13.766	34	14.266	22	13.400	48	55.265	20
Emily Little (AUS)	14.466	21	13.791	32	13.566	41	13.200	67	55.023	23
Ashleigh Brennan (AUS)	13.766	64			14.300	19	13.833	24		
Georgia Wheeler (AUS)	13.066	139	10.766	140	13.466	49				
Larissa Miller (AUS)			14.300	15			13.633	33		
Italy	54.532	20	54.065	8	55.391	6	55.191	7	219.179	7
Vanessa Ferrari (ITA)	13.833	55	13.933	24	13.900	33	14.458	7	56.124	13
Elisabetta Preziosa (ITA)	13.666	73	12.766	68	14.525	11	13.633	32	54.590	27
Lia Parolari (ITA)	13.133	128	12.200	87	13.600	38	13.500	40	52.433	46
Serena Licchetta (ITA)	13.800	56	14.100	20			13.600	35		
Eleonora Rando (ITA)	13.233	120	13.266	49	13.366	54				
Jessica Mattoni (ITA)					13.250	63	13.433	42		
Japan	56.466	7	53.432	10	54.731	8	54.266	10	218.895	8
Rie Tanaka (JPN)	14.333	22	13.800	30	13.866	35	13.700	27	55.699	14
Koko Tsurumi (JPN)	13.900	45	12.733	70	14.166	24	13.933	20	54.732	25
Yuko Shintake (JPN)	13.666	74	13.866	28	13.366	56	12.666	106	53.564	37
Momoko Ozawa (JPN)	14.300	23	12.900	60	12.700	86	12.933	84	52.833	42
Mai Yamagishi (JPN)	13.933	44			13.333	60	13.700	28		
Kyoko Oshima (JPN)			12.866	63						
Netherlands	54.982	14	53.365	11	54.466	10	54.473	8	217.286	9
Céline van Gerner (NED)	13.800	58	14.233	16	13.100	70	14.266	9	55.399	19
Joy Goedkoop (NED)	13.866	50	13.466	42	13.133	68	13.308	55	53.773	33
Marlies Rijken (NED)	13.533	93	12.633	78	13.900	34	13.100	73	53.166	38
Suzanne Harmes (NED)	13.666	78	12.733	69	13.233	64	13.433	44	53.065	39
Sanne Wevers (NED)			12.933	56	14.200	23				
Yvette Moshage (NED)	13.650	79					13.466	41		
Brazil	56.766	6	52.799	12	53.232	14	54.333	9	217.130	10
Daniele Hypólito (BRA)	13.933	43	13.166	51	13.933	30	14.100	14	55.132	21
Jade Barbosa (BRA)	14.900	7	13.300	47	12.933	76	13.633	34	54.766	24
Priscila Domingues (BRA)	13.800	57	11.800	110	13.500	47	13.300	56	53.400	47
Bruna Leal (BRA)	14.000	37	13.500	41	12.300	105	12.300	130	52.100	54
Adrian Gomes (BRA)	13.933	42			12.866	77	13.300	57		
Ethiene Franco (BRA)			12.833	65						
France	55.298	11	53.999	9	53.899	12	53.765	11	216.961	11
Aurélie Malaussena (FRA)	14.066	33	13.900	27	13.566	40	13.566	37	55.098	22
Marine Brevet (FRA)	13.866	48	12.933	59	13.700	37	13.566	38	54.065	31
Pauline Morel (FRA)	13.700	70	13.933	25	13.333	58	12.700	101	53.666	34
Marine Petit (FRA)	13.633	82	13.233	50	13.300	61	13.400	47	53.566	36
Eva Maurin (FRA)	13.666	77	10.933	136	12.533	91	13.233	62	50.365	76
Ukraine	54.773	18	50.999	15	54.532	9	53.641	12	213.945	12
Valentyna Holenkova (UKR)	13.966	38	12.866	62	12.866	80	13.900	22	53.598	35
Alona Kaydalova (UKR)	13.966	39	12.800	66	12.500	94	12.900	88	52.166	53
Yevheniya Cherniy (UKR)	13.341	112	11.766	116	13.900	32	12.933	83	51.940	57
Anastasia Koval (UKR)	13.500	97	11.900	103	13.233	66	13.208	65	51.841	58
Yana Demyanchuk (UKR)			13.433	43	14.533	10				
Alina Fomenko (UKR)	13.133	133					13.600	35		
Canada	54.832	17	51.148	14	53.598	13	52.899	13	212.477	13
Kristina Vaculik (CAN)	13.666	75	12.900	61	14.066	25	13.433	45	54.065	30
Coralie Leblond-Chartrand (CAN)	13.800	58	11.866	104	12.033	124	13.100	71	50.799	71
Emma Willis (CAN)	13.566	91	11.533	123	13.566	39	11.900	155	50.565	73
Jessica Savona (CAN)	13.800	60	12.716	71			13.700	29		
Charlotte Mackie (CAN)	13.566	89			13.466	48	12.666	105		
Bianca Dancose-Giambattisto (CAN)			13.666	37	12.500	95				
Germany	55.407	10	55.657	6	49.465	22	51.765	19	212.294	14
Elisabeth Seitz (GER)	14.633	14	14.966	6	12.733	85	13.133	70	55.465	18
Lisa Katharina Hill (GER)	13.733	66	13.800	31	11.566	140	12.333	128	51.432	62
Pia Tolle (GER)	13.400	107	13.325	46	11.600	139	12.566	115	50.891	69
Joeline Möbius (GER)	13.641	80	12.841	64	10.033	176	13.333	52	49.848	83
Oksana Chusovitina (GER)	13.200	125			13.566	42				
Giulia Hindermann (GER)			13.566	40			12.733	99		
Belgium	55.048	13	50.565	16	52.032	15	52.132	14	209.777	15
Aagje Vanwalleghem (BEL)	13.866	49	13.833	29	13.566	43	13.066	76	54.331	29
Julie Croket (BEL)	14.016	35	13.366	45	11.600	138	13.800	26	52.782	43
Floriane Scianguetta (BEL)	13.666	76	12.000	99	13.200	67	12.633	111	51.499	61
Gaelle Mys (BEL)			11.366	126	12.966	74	12.633	110		
Lin Versonnen (BEL)	13.500	95	11.100	133	12.300	103				
Alice Canart (BEL)	13.166	127					12.400	123		
Switzerland	53.798	24	52.166	13	50.866	16	51.931	17	208.761	16
Ariella Käslin (SUI)	14.566	18	13.900	26	14.000	29	13.966	18	56.432	10
Linda Stämpfli (SUI)	13.133	129	12.633	76	12.466	96	12.866	89	51.098	67
Giulia Steingruber (SUI)	12.733	158	13.100	53	12.300	104	12.833	92	50.966	68
Jennifer Rutz (SUI)	13.366	110			12.033	122	12.266	131		
Jennifer Senn (SUI)	11.900	182	12.533	80			11.466	170		
Jessica Diacci (SUI)			12.500	82	12.100	117				
Poland	55.240	12	45.432	26	53.966	11	52.132	14	206.770	17
Marta Pihan-Kulesza (POL)	13.833	47	13.033	55	14.400	14	13.366	51	54.682	26
Gabriela Janik (POL)	14.125	28	12.066	93	12.933	75	12.833	90	51.957	56
Paula Plichta (POL)	13.766	63	7.166	184	13.100	69	12.033	148	46.065	123
Katarzyna Jurkowska (POL)	13.125	134			13.533	44	13.033	79		
Monika Frandofert (POL)			11.833	108	12.033	123	12.900	86		
Joanna Litewka (POL)	13.466	102	8.500	179						
Spain	54.399	22	50.165	17	50.665	19	51.132	21	206.361	18
Ainhoa Carmona (ESP)	13.700	71	12.333	85	13.033	73	13.266	58	52.332	49
Claudia Vila (ESP)	13.600	84	12.666	73	13.366	55	12.700	100	52.332	50
Cristiana Mironescu (ESP)	13.833	54	12.000	98	13.066	71	12.533	119	51.432	64
Cintia Rodríguez (ESP)	13.266	115	13.166	52	11.200	152	12.633	108	50.265	77
Elena Zaldívar (ESP)					10.500	171	12.433	122		
Ana María Izurieta (ESP)	12.800	154								
Greece	54.491	21	49.565	19	50.799	17	51.299	20	206.154	19
Vasiliki Millousi (GRE)	13.100	135	13.066	54	13.533	45	13.233	60	52.932	41
Stefani Bismpikou (GRE)	13.633	81	12.700	72	12.766	84	12.000	150	51.099	65
Evgenia Zafeiraki (GRE)	13.600	85	12.133	88	11.900	128	12.833	94	50.466	75
Paschalina Mitrakou (GRE)	13.400	105	10.641	143	12.300	108	13.233	61	49.574	88
Andriana Syrigou Antouniou (GRE)	13.858	51	11.666	120						
Maria Pitsikali (GRE)					12.200	111	11.300	174		
South Korea	54.699	19	48.031	20	50.698	18	51.832	18	205.260	20
Jo Hyun-joo (KOR)	14.000	36	12.666	75	13.066	72	13.266	59	52.998	40
Park Ji-yeon (KOR)	13.533	92	12.666	74	12.800	83	12.533	117	51.532	60
Park Eun-kyung (KOR)	13.433	104	12.133	89	12.466	97	12.166	138	50.198	78
Eum Eun-hui (KOR)	13.733	67	10.466	149	12.366	101	13.433	46	49.998	80
Moon Eun-mi (KOR)	12.933	145			12.200	112	12.600	112		
Seo Yi-seul (KOR)			10.566	144						
Mexico	55.565	9	47.223	22	50.290	20	50.965	22	204.043	21
Elsa García (MEX)	14.066	31	12.033	96	12.866	79	13.333	53	52.298	51
Yessenia Estrada (MEX)	14.233	25	10.466	150	13.333	59	13.066	77	51.098	66
Marisela Cantú (MEX)	12.266	177	12.066	94	12.658	89	12.666	102	49.656	87
Mitzi Unda-Sosa (MEX)	13.533	94	11.433	124	11.433	145	11.433	172	47.832	104
Alexa Moreno (MEX)	13.733	65			11.433	143	11.900	154		
Daniela de León (MEX)			11.691	119						
Venezuela	54.932	15	49.965	18	47.132	26	49.832	25	201.861	22
Jessica López (VEN)	14.500	20	13.766	33	13.466	50	13.900	23	55.632	15
Fanny Briceño (VEN)	13.033	144	12.266	86	12.300	107	12.066	145	49.665	86
Maciel Peña (VEN)	13.500	96	11.133	132	11.800	132	12.766	96	49.199	90
Yarimar Medina (VEN)	13.466	100	10.466	148	9.266	182	11.100	176	44.298	129
Johanny Sotillo (VEN)	13.466	99	12.800	67	9.566	179				
Ivet Rojas (VEN)							3.100	183		
Hungary	54.065	23	46.465	23	47.465	25	50.733	24	198.728	23
Tünde Csillag (HUN)	13.700	72	11.600	122	12.066	118	13.400	49	50.766	72
Renata Tóth (HUN)	13.766	62	11.933	100	11.266	150	12.833	93	49.798	84
Luca Divéky (HUN)	13.133	131	11.166	131	11.633	137	12.300	129	48.232	97
Hajnalka Lonai (HUN)	13.233	121	9.766	162	12.500	93	12.200	136	47.699	106
Laura Gombás (HUN)	13.366	109	11.766	115						
Szilvia Szabadfi (HUN)					10.733	166	12.033	146		
Uzbekistan	51.707	31	44.199	30	50.165	21	51.999	16	198.070	24
Luiza Galiulina (UZB)	12.633	162	12.500	83	14.066	26	13.400	49	52.599	45
Asal Saparbaeva (UZB)	12.700	159	11.866	105	11.700	135	13.100	74	49.266	89
Irina Volodchenko (UZB)	13.241	118	9.533	170	12.033	121	13.166	68	47.973	100
Diana Karimdjanova (UZB)	12.900	147	10.300	154	12.366	102	11.633	168	47.199	112
Yuliya Goreva (UZB)	12.866	150	9.433	171	8.666	186	12.333	127	43.298	138
Belarus	54.932	15	44.599	28	46.731	28	50.863	23	197.127	25
Alina Sotnikava (BLR)	13.933	40	10.833	137	12.166	113	13.433	43	50.365	75
Liliya Khaanh (BLR)	12.800	153	12.100	91	11.166	155	11.766	161	47.832	103
Yauheniya Zaitsava (BLR)	13.466	101	9.933	159	11.466	142	12.666	107	47.531	110
Nadzeya Vysotskaya (BLR)	13.433	103	8.966	176	10.066	175	11.800	158	44.265	130
Nastassia Marachkouskaya (BLR)	14.100	30			11.933	127				
Volha Makhautsova (BLR)			11.733	118			12.966	82		
Slovenia	51.932	29	46.099	24	48.865	24	49.366	30	196.162	26
Fiona Novak (SLO)	13.100	136	11.800	112	12.666	88	12.400	125	49.966	81
Teja Belak (SLO)	13.233	119	11.733	117	11.966	126	12.233	133	49.165	91
Tjaša Kysselef (SLO)	13.233	122	11.166	130	12.000	125	12.633	109	49.032	93
Ivana Kamnikar (SLO)	12.266	175	11.400	125	12.233	109	12.100	142	47.999	99
Carmen Horvat (SLO)			10.200	155	11.033	158				
Finland	52.683	26	45.432	26	46.966	27	49.431	29	194.512	27
Annika Urvikko (FIN)	13.400	106	11.900	102	11.800	131	12.833	91	49.933	82
Ida Laisi (FIN)	13.200	124	11.866	106	11.300	149	12.266	132	48.632	94
Rosanna Ojala (FIN)	13.050	140	11.933	101	11.733	134	11.300	175	48.016	98
Kaisa Chirinos (FIN)	12.600	163	9.200	173	10.466	172	12.666	103	44.932	126
Paula Tiitta (FIN)	13.033	142					11.666	167		
Reeta Pietilae (FIN)			9.733	163	12.133	114				
Israel	51.899	28	42.765	33	48.982	23	49.733	26	193.379	28
Roni Rabinovitz (ISR)	13.566	90	12.033	97	13.500	46	13.233	63	52.332	48
Valeria Maksyuta (ISR)	14.100	29	12.066	94	12.816	82	13.100	75	52.082	55
Hadas Koren (ISR)	11.933	181	11.333	127	11.366	147	11.500	169	46.132	122
Sapir Hana Cohen (ISR)	12.300	173	7.333	183	11.300	148	11.900	152	42.833	142
South Africa	52.031	27	45.665	25	45.366	32	49.266	31	192.328	29
Jennifer Khwela (RSA)	13.566	88	11.766	114	10.600	168	12.600	113	48.532	95
Nicole Szabo (RSA)	12.833	151	11.033	134	11.500	141	12.400	124	47.766	105
Chantel Swan (RSA)	12.266	176	12.066	92	10.433	173	11.666	166	46.431	120
Chanel Parsons (RSA)	12.366	170	10.800	139	11.433	144	11.766	159	46.365	121
Ashleigh Heldsinger (RSA)	13.266	116	8.266	180	11.833	130	12.500	120	45.865	124
Czech Republic	51.832	29	44.132	32	45.966	29	49.498	28	191.428	30
Jana Šikulová (CZE)	13.566	86	12.533	81	12.100	116	12.666	104	50.865	70
Nicole Pechancová (CZE)	13.166	126	8.800	177	12.866	78	13.000	80	47.832	102
Alice Jáňová (CZE)	12.500	166	9.533	169	10.100	174	11.766	160	43.899	134
Klara Hadrbolcová (CZE)	12.600	164			9.800	178	12.066	143		
Marcela Moláčková (CZE)	0.000	185	9.633	165	10.900	160	0.000	184	20.533	207
Kristýna Pálešová (CZE)			12.433	84						
Austria	52.732	25	44.598	29	44.665	33	48.599	32	190.594	31
Jasmin Mader (AUT)	13.366	111	10.933	135	10.866	164	12.533	118	47.698	107
Katharina Fa (AUT)	12.700	160	11.266	129	12.066	120	11.666	165	47.698	108
Simone Penker (AUT)	13.066	138	10.766	141	11.100	156	12.100	141	47.032	115
Lisa Ecker (AUT)	13.600	83	7.633	182	9.366	181	12.066	144	42.665	144
Lisa Maria Stöckl (AUT)	12.300	174			10.633	167	11.900	153		
Hanna Grosch (AUT)			11.633	121						
Portugal	51.007	33	44.199	30	45.599	30	49.599	27	190.404	32
Alexandra Choon (POR)	12.333	172	11.300	128	11.266	151	12.200	135	47.099	113
Ekaterina Kislinskaya (POR)	11.733	183	12.933	57	9.533	180	12.733	97	46.932	116
Rita Oliveira (POR)	12.733	156	9.766	161	10.900	161	11.900	151	45.299	125
Zoi Lima (POR)	12.900	147			12.500	92	12.766	95		
Diana Abrantes (POR)	13.041	141	9.266	172			11.800	156		
Marta Damasio (POR)			10.200	156	10.933	159				
Denmark	51.065	32	40.866	34	39.332	34	47.099	33	233.778	33
Mette Hulgaard (DEN)	12.800	152	10.800	138	10.566	169	12.566	114	46.732	117
Mia Furu (DEN)	12.733	155	9.133	174	10.500	170	11.800	157	44.166	132
Lærke Andersen (DEN)	13.066	137	9.633	166	9.100	185	11.733	162	43.532	136
Michelle Lauritsen (DEN)	12.466	167	10.533	145	9.166	183	10.000	182	42.165	145
Miriam Offersgaard (DEN)	12.400	169	9.900	160						
Louise Jensen (DEN)					8.008	187	11.000	177		
Colombia	40.399	34	47.665	21	45.499	31	37.566	34	171.129	34
Catalina Escobar (COL)	14.133	27	12.566	79	11.733	133	13.000	81	51.432	63
Melba Avendaño (COL)	13.133	129	12.133	90	12.066	119	12.433	121	49.765	85
Lizeth Ruiz (COL)	13.133	132	10.333	153	10.900	162	12.133	140	46.499	119
Nathalia Sánchez (COL)			12.633	77	10.800	165				
Jessica Gil Ortiz (COL)			0.000	187	0.000	188				
Laura Švilpaitė (LTU)	13.366	108	13.766	35	12.433	98	13.100	72	52.665	44
Ida Jonsson (SWE)	13.766	61	11.800	109	13.766	36	12.933	85	52.265	53
Göksu Üçtaş (TUR)	14.200	26	11.766	113	12.433	99	13.166	69	51.565	59
Mária Homolová (SVK)	12.916	146	11.800	111	12.666	87	12.733	98	50.115	79
Lucila Estarli (ARG)	13.266	117	10.500	146	12.366	100	12.900	87	49.032	92
Jordan Rae (NZL)	13.283	114	10.733	142	12.300	106	12.166	137	48.482	96
Ayelén Tarabini (ARG)	12.733	157	9.600	167	13.466	51	12.166	139	47.965	101
Thelma Hermannsdóttir (ISL)	13.300	113	10.333	152	12.200	110	11.733	163	47.566	109
Briana Mitchell (NZL)	12.233	178	10.500	147	12.633	90	12.033	147	47.399	111
Ralitsa Mileva (BUL)	13.225	123	10.133	158	11.366	146	12.333	126	47.057	114
Sema Fidel Aslan (TUR)	13.033	143	10.433	151	11.666	136	11.433	171	46.565	118
Holly Moon (NZL)	12.466	168	9.533	168	11.100	157	11.733	164	44.832	127
Özlem Özkan (TUR)	12.566	165	8.733	178	11.200	153	12.233	134	44.732	128
Dominiqua Belányi (ISL)	12.866	149	10.166	157	9.166	184	12.000	149	44.198	131
Aldana Carraro (ARG)	12.100	180	9.700	164	10.866	163	10.866	179	43.532	137
Chen Yu Chun (TPE)	12.133	179	7.733	181	11.866	129	11.400	173	43.132	139
Lo Yu Ju (TPE)	12.333	171	7.033	185	11.166	154	10.266	180	40.798	153
Ng Pui Sze (HKG)	10.433	184	4.266	186	9.933	177	10.166	181	34.798	170
Hiu Ying Angel Wong (HKG)	13.466	98	9.125	175	12.133	115				
Greta Nevedomskaitė (LTU)	12.633	161					10.900	178		
Veronica Wagner (SWE)					13.233	65				

== Individual all-around ==
Rank	Gymnast	Nation	Vault (gymnastics)	Uneven bars	Balance beam	Floor (gymnastics)	Total	Qual.
1	Aliya Mustafina	Russia	15.600	15.300	14.933	14.833	60.666	Q
2	Rebecca Bross	United States	14.716	14.933	15.266	14.166	59.081	Q
3	Aly Raisman	United States	15.033	14.133	14.766	14.383	58.315	Q
4	Jiang Yuyuan	China	14.733	15.200	14.333	13.833	58.099	Q
5	Huang Qiushuang	China	14.600	15.666	14.466	13.333	58.065	Q
6	Ana Porgras	Romania	13.833	14.733	15.266	14.066	57.898	Q
7	Lauren Mitchell	Australia	14.733	13.700	14.966	14.466	57.865	Q
8	Tatiana Nabieva	Russia	15.466	14.700	14.333	13.066	57.565	Q
9	Mackenzie Caquatto	United States	14.933	14.466	14.266	13.533	57.198	-
10	Ariella Käslin	Switzerland	14.566	13.900	14.000	13.966	56.432	Q
11	Mattie Larson	United States	14.966	14.200	13.933	13.233	56.332	-
12	Raluca Haidu	Romania	14.633	14.000	13.366	14.200	56.199	Q
13	Vanessa Ferrari	Italy	13.833	13.933	13.900	14.458	56.124	Q
14	Rie Tanaka	Japan	14.333	13.800	13.866	13.700	55.699	Q
15	Jessica López	Venezuela	14.500	13.766	13.466	13.900	55.632	Q
16	Hannah Whelan	Great Britain	14.033	12.933	14.300	14.233	55.499	Q
17	Ksenia Afanasyeva	Russia	14.300	11.866	14.533	14.766	55.465	-
18	Elisabeth Seitz	Germany	14.633	14.966	12.733	13.133	55.465	Q
19	Céline van Gerner	Netherlands	13.800	14.233	13.100	14.266	55.399	Q
20	Georgia Bonora	Australia	13.833	13.766	14.266	13.400	55.265	Q
21	Daniele Hypólito	Brazil	13.933	13.166	13.933	14.100	55.132	Q
22	Aurélie Malaussena	France	14.066	13.900	13.566	13.566	55.098	Q
23	Emily Little	Australia	14.466	13.791	13.566	13.200	55.023	-
24	Jade Barbosa	Brazil	14.900	13.300	12.933	13.633	54.766	Q
25	Koko Tsurumi	Japan	13.900	12.733	14.166	13.933	54.732	Q
26	Marta Pihan-Kulesza	Poland	13.883	13.033	14.400	13.366	54.682	Q
27	Elisabetta Preziosa	Italy	13.666	12.766	14.525	13.633	54.590	Q
28	Nicole Hibbert	Great Britain	13.933	14.000	13.433	13.200	54.566	Q
29	Aagje Vanwalleghem	Belgium	13.866	13.833	13.566	13.066	54.331	R
30	Kristina Vaculik	Canada	13.666	12.900	14.066	13.433	54.065	R
31	Marine Brevet	France	13.866	12.933	13.700	13.566	54.065	R
32	Jennifer Pinches	Great Britain	13.566	13.566	12.833	13.933	53.898	-
33	Joy Goedkoop	Netherlands	13.866	13.466	13.133	13.308	53.773	R
34	Pauline Morel	France	13.7	13.933	13.333	12.7	53.666	
35	Valentyna Holenkova	Ukraine	13.966	12.866	12.866	13.9	53.598	
36	Marine Petit	France	13.633	13.233	13.3	13.4	53.566	
37	Yuko Shintake	Japan	13.666	13.866	13.366	12.666	53.564	
38	Marlies Rijken	Netherlands	13.533	12.633	13.9	13.1	53.166	
39	Suzanne Harmes	Netherlands	13.666	12.733	13.233	13.433	53.065	
40	Jo Hyun-joo	South Korea	14	12.666	13.066	13.266	52.998	
41	Vasiliki Millousi	Greece	13.1	13.066	13.533	13.233	52.932	
42	Momoko Ozawa	Japan	14.3	12.9	12.7	12.933	52.833	
43	Julie Croket	Belgium	14.016	13.366	11.6	13.8	52.782	
44	Laura Švilpaitė	Lithuania	13.366	13.766	12.433	13.1	52.665	
45	Luiza Galiulina	Uzbekistan	12.633	12.5	14.066	13.4	52.599	
46	Lia Parolari	Italy	13.133	12.2	13.6	13.5	52.433	
47	Priscila Domingues	Brazil	13.8	11.8	13.5	13.3	52.4	
48	Roni Rabinovitz	Israel	13.566	12.033	13.5	13.233	52.332	
49	Ainhoa Carmona	Spain	13.7	12.333	13.033	13.266	52.332	
50	Claudia Vila	Spain	13.6	12.666	13.366	12.7	52.332	
51	Elsa García	Mexico	14.066	12.033	12.866	13.333	52.298	
52	Ida Jonsson	Sweden	13.766	11.8	13.766	12.933	52.265	
53	Alona Kaydalova	Ukraine	13.966	12.8	12.5	12.9	52.166	
54	Bruna Leal	Brazil	14	13.5	12.3	12.3	52.1	
55	Valeria Maksyuta	Israel	14.1	12.066	12.816	13.1	52.082	
56	Gabriela Janik	Poland	14.125	12.066	12.933	12.833	51.957	
57	Yevheniya Cherniy	Ukraine	13.341	11.766	13.9	12.933	51.94	
58	Anastasiia Koval	Ukraine	13.5	11.9	13.233	13.208	51.841	
59	Göksu Üçtaş	Turkey	14.2	11.766	12.433	13.166	51.565	
60	Park Ji-yeon	South Korea	13.533	12.666	12.8	12.533	51.532	
61	Floriane Scianguetta	Belgium	13.666	12	13.2	12.633	51.499	
62	Lisa Katharina Hill	Germany	13.733	13.8	11.566	12.333	51.432	
63	Catalina Escobar	Colombia	14.133	12.566	11.733	13	51.432	
64	Cristiana Mironescu	Spain	13.833	12	13.066	12.533	51.432	
65	Stefani Bismpikou	Greece	13.633	12.7	12.766	12	51.099	
66	Yessenia Estrada	Mexico	14.233	10.466	13.333	13.066	51.098	
67	Linda Stämpfli	Switzerland	13.133	12.633	12.466	12.866	51.098	
68	Giulia Steingruber	Switzerland	12.733	13.1	12.3	12.833	50.966	
69	Pia Tolle	Germany	13.4	13.325	11.6	12.566	50.891	
70	Jana Šikulová	Czech Republic	13.566	12.533	12.1	12.666	50.865	
71	Coralie Leblond-Chartrand	Canada	13.8	11.866	12.033	13.1	50.799	
72	Tünde Csillag	Hungary	13.7	11.6	12.066	13.4	50.766	
73	Emma Willis	Canada	13.566	11.533	13.566	11.9	50.565	
74	Evgenia Zafeiraki	Greece	13.6	12.133	11.9	12.833	50.466	
75	Alina Sotnikava	Belarus	13.933	10.833	12.166	13.433	50.365	
76	Eva Maurin	France	13.666	10.933	12.533	13.233	50.365	
77	Cintia Rodríguez	Spain	13.266	13.166	11.2	12.633	50.265	
78	Park Eun-kyung	South Korea	13.433	12.133	12.466	12.166	50.198	
79	Mária Homolová	Slovakia	12.916	11.8	12.666	12.733	50.115	
80	Eum Eun-hui	South Korea	13.733	10.466	12.366	13.433	49.998	
81	Fiona Novak	Slovenia	13.1	11.8	12.666	12.4	49.966	
82	Annika Urvikko	Finland	13.4	11.9	11.8	12.833	49.933	
83	Joeline Möbius	Germany	13.641	12.841	10.033	13.333	49.848	
84	Renata Tóth	Hungary	13.766	11.933	11.266	12.833	49.798	
85	Melba Avendaño	Colombia	13.133	12.133	12.066	12.433	49.765	
86	Fanny Briceño	Venezuela	13.033	12.266	12.3	12.066	49.665	
87	Marisela Cantú	Mexico	12.266	12.066	12.658	12.666	49.656	
88	Paschalina Mitrakou	Greece	13.4	10.641	12.3	13.233	49.574	
89	Asal Saparbaeva	Uzbekistan	12.7	11.866	11.7	13.1	49.366	
90	Maciel Peña	Venezuela	13.5	11.133	11.8	12.766	49.199	
91	Teja Belak	Slovenia	13.233	11.733	11.966	12.233	49.165	
92	Lucila Estarli	Argentina	13.266	10.5	12.366	12.9	49.032	
93	Tjaša Kysselef	Slovenia	13.233	11.166	12	12.633	49.032	
94	Ida Laisi	Finland	13.2	11.866	11.3	12.266	48.632	
95	Jennifer Khwela	South Africa	13.566	11.766	10.6	12.6	48.532	
96	Jordan Rae	New Zealand	13.283	10.733	12.3	12.166	48.482	
97	Luca Divéky	Hungary	13.133	11.166	11.633	12.3	48.232	
98	Rosanna Ojala	Finland	13.05	11.933	11.733	11.3	48.016	
99	Ivana Kamnikar	Slovenia	12.266	11.4	12.233	12.1	47.999	
100	Irina Volodchenko	Uzbekistan	13.241	9.533	12.033	13.166	47.973	
101	Ayelén Tarabini	Argentina	12.733	9.6	13.466	12.166	47.965	
102	Nicole Pechancová	Czech Republic	13.166	8.8	12.866	13	47.832	
103	Liliya Khaanh	Belarus	12.8	12.1	11.166	11.766	47.832	
104	Mitzi Unda-Sosa	Mexico	13.533	11.433	11.433	11.433	47.832	
105	Nicole Szabo	South Africa	12.833	11.033	11.5	12.4	47.766	
106	Hajnalka Lonai	Hungary	13.233	9.766	12.5	12.2	47.699	
107	Jasmin Mader	Austria	13.366	10.933	10.866	12.533	47.698	
108	Katharina Fa	Austria	12.7	11.266	12.066	11.666	47.698	
109	Thelma Hermannsdóttir	Iceland	13.3	10.333	12.2	11.733	47.566	
110	Yauheniya Zaitsava	Belarus	13.466	9.933	11.466	12.666	47.531	
111	Briana Mitchell	New Zealand	12.233	10.5	12.633	12.033	47.399	
112	Diana Karimdjanova	Uzbekistan	12.9	10.3	12.366	11.633	47.199	
113	Alexandra Choon	Portugal	12.333	11.3	11.266	12.2	47.099	
114	Ralitsa Mileva	Bulgaria	13.225	10.133	11.366	12.333	47.057	
115	Simone Penker	Austria	13.066	10.766	11.1	12.1	47.032	
116	Ekaterina Kislinskaya	Portugal	11.733	12.933	9.533	12.733	46.932	
117	Mette Hulgaard	Denmark	12.8	10.8	10.566	12.566	46.732	
118	Sema Fidel Aslan	Turkey	13.033	10.433	11.666	11.433	46.565	
119	Lizeth Ruiz	Colombia	13.133	10.333	10.9	12.133	46.499	
120	Chantel Swan	South Africa	12.266	12.066	10.433	11.666	46.431	
121	Chanel Parsons	South Africa	12.366	10.8	11.433	11.766	46.365	
122	Hadas Koren	Israel	11.933	11.333	11.366	11.5	46.132	
123	Paula Plichta	Poland	13.766	7.166	13.1	12.033	46.065	
124	Ashleigh Heldsinger	South Africa	13.266	8.266	11.833	12.5	45.865	
125	Rita Oliveira	Portugal	12.733	9.766	10.9	11.9	45.299	
126	Kaisa Chirinos	Finland	12.6	9.2	10.466	12.666	44.932	
127	Holly Moon	New Zealand	12.466	9.533	11.1	11.733	44.832	
128	Özlem Özkan	Turkey	12.566	8.733	11.2	12.233	44.732	
129	Yarimar Medina	Venezuela	13.466	10.466	9.266	11.1	44.298	
130	Nadzeya Vysotskaya	Belarus	13.433	8.966	10.066	11.8	44.265	
131	Dominiqua Belányi	Iceland	12.866	10.166	9.166	12	44.198	
132	Mia Furu	Denmark	12.733	9.133	10.5	11.8	44.166	
133	Sandra Izbașa	Romania	14.833		14.333	14.766	43.932	
134	Alice Jáňová	Czech Republic	12.5	9.533	10.1	11.766	43.899	
135	Anna Dementyeva	Russia		14.2	15.133	14.2	43.533	
136	Lærke Andersen	Denmark	13.066	9.633	9.1	11.733	43.532	
137	Aldana Carraro	Argentina	12.1	9.7	10.866	10.866	43.532	
138	Yuliya Goreva	Uzbekistan	12.866	9.433	8.666	12.333	43.298	
139	Yu Chun Chen	Chinese Taipei	12.133	7.733	11.866	11.4	43.132	
140	Diana Chelaru	Romania	14.6	14		14.466	43.066	
141	Yang Yilin	China	14.566	14.683	0	13.666	42.915	
142	Sapir Hana Cohen	Israel	12.3	7.333	11.3	11.9	42.833	
143	Sui Lu	China		13.633	14.4	14.633	42.666	
144	Lisa Ecker	Austria	13.6	7.633	9.366	12.066	42.665	
145	Michelle Lauritsen	Denmark	12.466	10.533	9.166	10	42.165	
146	Rebecca Downie	United Kingdom	13.7	14.3	14.033		42.033	
147	Ashleigh Brennan	Australia	13.766		14.3	13.833	41.899	
148	Imogen Cairns	United Kingdom	14.525		13.266	14.066	41.857	
149	Serena Licchetta	Italy	13.8	14.1		13.6	41.5	
150	Ksenia Semenova	Russia	14.066		14.458	12.566	41.09	
151	Cerasela Pătrașcu	Romania	13.733	13.3	14		41.033	
152	Mai Yamagishi	Japan	13.933		13.333	13.7	40.966	
153	Yu Ju Lo	Chinese Taipei	12.333	7.033	11.166	10.266	40.798	
154	Jessica Savona	Canada	13.8	12.716		13.7	40.216	
155	Adrian Gomes	Brazil	13.933		12.866	13.3	40.099	
156	Eleonora Rando	Italy	13.233	13.266	13.366		39.865	
157	Charlotte Mackie	Canada	13.566		13.466	12.666	39.698	
158	Katarzyna Jurkowska	Poland	13.125		13.533	13.033	39.691	
159	Zoi Lima	Portugal	12.9		12.5	12.766	38.166	
160	Moon Eun-mi	South Korea	12.933		12.2	12.6	37.733	
161	Jennifer Rutz	Switzerland	13.366		12.033	12.266	37.665	
162	Georgia Wheeler	Australia	13.066	10.766	13.466		37.298	
163	Alexa Moreno	Mexico	13.733		11.433	11.9	37.066	
164	Gaelle Mys	Belgium		11.366	12.966	12.633	36.965	
165	Lin Versonnen	Belgium	13.5	11.1	12.3		36.9	
166	Monika Frandofert	Poland		11.833	12.033	12.9	36.766	
167	Jennifer Senn	Switzerland	11.9	12.533		11.466	35.899	
168	Johanny Sotillo	Venezuela	13.466	12.8	9.566		35.832	
169	Lisa Maria Stöckl	Austria	12.3		10.633	11.9	34.833	
170	Pui Sze Ng	Hong Kong	10.433	4.266	9.933	10.166	34.798	
171	Hiu Ying Angel Wong	Hong Kong	13.466	9.125	12.133		34.724	
172	Klara Hadrbolcová	Czech Republic	12.6		9.8	12.066	34.466	
173	Diana Abrantes	Portugal	13.041	9.266		11.8	34.107	
174	Alicia Sacramone	United States	15.466		14.866		30.332	
175	He Kexin	China	0	16.066		13.933	29.999	
176	Elizabeth Tweddle	United Kingdom		15.6		14	29.6	
177	Ekaterina Kurbatova	Russia	14.733	14.3			29.033	
178	Deng Linlin	China	13.9		15.1		29	
179	Bridget Sloan	United States		14.7		13.7	28.4	
180	Yana Demyanchuk	Ukraine		13.433	14.533		27.966	
181	Larrissa Miller	Australia		14.3		13.633	27.933	
182	Sanne Wevers	Netherlands		12.933	14.2		27.133	
183	Yvette Moshage	Netherlands	13.65			13.466	27.116	
184	Oksana Chusovitina	Germany	13.2		13.566		26.766	
185	Gabriela Drăgoi	Romania		13.366	13.4		26.766	
186	Alina Fomenko	Ukraine	13.133			13.6	26.733	
187	Jessica Mattoni	Italy			13.25	13.433	26.683	
188	Giulia Hindermann	Germany		13.566		12.733	26.299	
189	Bianca Dancose-Giambattisto	Canada	13.666	12.5			26.166	
190	Nastassia Marachkouskaya	Belarus	14.1		11.933		26.033	
191	Alice Canart	Belgium	13.166			12.4	25.566	
192	Andriana Syrigou Antoniou	Greece	13.858	11.666			25.524	
193	Laura Gombás	Hungary	13.366	11.766			25.132	
194	Paula Tiitta	Finland	13.033			11.666	24.699	
195	Volha Makhautsova	Belarus		11.733		12.966	24.699	
196	Jessica Diacci	Switzerland		12.5	12.1		24.6	
197	Greta Nevedomskaitė	Lithuania	12.633			10.9	23.533	
198	Maria Pitsikali	Greece			12.2	11.3	23.5	
199	Nathalia Sánchez	Colombia		12.633	10.8		23.433	
200	Elena Zaldívar	Spain			10.5	12.433	22.933	
201	Szilvia Szabadfi	Hungary			10.733	12.033	22.766	
202	Miriam Offersgaard	Denmark	12.4	9.9			22.3	
203	Joanna Litewka	Poland	13.466	8.5			21.966	
204	Reeta Pietilae	Finland		9.733	12.133		21.866	
205	Carmen Horvat	Slovenia		10.2	11.033		21.233	
206	Marta Damasio	Portugal		10.2	10.933		21.133	
207	Marcela Moláčková	Czech Republic	0	9.633	10.9	0	20.533	
208	Louise Jensen	Denmark			8.008	11	19.008	
209	Veronica Wagner	Sweden			13.233		13.233	
210	Kyoko Oshima	Japan		12.866			12.866	
211	Ethiene Franco	Brazil		12.833			12.833	
212	Ana María Izurieta	Spain	12.8				12.8	
213	Kristýna Pálešová	Czech Republic		12.433			12.433	
214	Daniela de León	Mexico		11.691			11.691	
215	Hanna Grosch	Austria		11.633			11.633	
216	Seo Yi-seul	South Korea		10.566			10.566	
217	Ivet Rojas	Venezuela				3.1	3.1	
218	Jessica Gil Ortíz	Colombia		0	0		0	

== Individual Event Finals ==
=== Vault ===
Rank	Gymnast	Nation	D Score	E Score	Pen.	Score 1	D Score	E Score	Pen.	Score 2	Total	Qual.
Rank	Gymnast	Nation	Vault 1				Vault 2				Total	Qual.
1	Aliya Mustafina	Russia	6.500	9.100		15.600	6.100	8.866		14.966	15.283	Q
2	Alicia Sacramone	United States	6.300	9.166		15.466	5.800	9.266		15.066	15.266	Q
3	Jade Barbosa	Brazil	5.800	9.100		14.900	5.600	8.766		14.366	14.633	Q
4	Ekaterina Kurbatova	Russia	5.800	8.933		14.733	5.600	8.933		14.533	14.633	Q
5	Ariella Käslin	Switzerland	5.900	8.666		14.566	5.800	8.841		14.641	14.603	Q
6	Tatiana Nabieva	Russia	6.500	8.966		15.466	5.200	8.766	0.3	13.666	14.566	-
7	Jo Hyun-joo	South Korea	5.600	8.500	0.1	14.000	5.800	8.700		14.500	14.250	Q
8	Imogen Cairns	Great Britain	5.300	9.225		14.525	4.800	9.066		13.866	14.195	Q
9	Diana Chelaru	Romania	5.800	8.800		14.600	4.800	8.633		13.433	14.016	Q
10	Huang Qiushuang	China	5.800	8.800		14.600	5.200	8.233		13.433	14.016	R
11	Yessenia Estrada	Mexico	5.300	8.933		14.233	4.800	8.766		13.566	13.899	R
12	Nicole Hibbert	Great Britain	5.300	8.733	0.1	13.933	5.200	8.600		13.800	13.866	R

=== Uneven bars ===
Rank	Gymnast	Nation	D Score	E Score	Pen.	Total	Qual.
1	He Kexin	China	7.200	8.866		16.066	Q
2	Huang Qiushuang	China	7.000	8.666		15.666	Q
3	Beth Tweddle	Great Britain	6.800	8.800		15.600	Q
4	Aliya Mustafina	Russia	6.800	8.500		15.300	Q
5	Jiang Yuyuan	China	6.700	8.500		15.200	-
6	Elisabeth Seitz	Germany	6.600	8.366		14.966	Q
7	Rebecca Bross	United States	6.200	8.733		14.933	Q
8	Ana Porgras	Romania	6.200	8.533		14.733	Q
9	Bridget Sloan	United States	6.000	8.700		14.700	Q
10	Tatiana Nabieva	Russia	6.400	8.300		14.700	R
11	Yang Yilin	China	6.100	8.583		14.683	-
12	Mackenzie Caquatto	United States	5.900	8.566		14.466	-
13	Ekaterina Kurbatova	Russia	5.800	8.500		14.300	-
14	Rebecca Downie	Great Britain	5.900	8.400		14.300	R
15	Larrissa Miller	Australia	5.900	8.400		14.300	R

=== Balance beam ===
Rank	Gymnast	Nation	D Score	E Score	Pen.	Total	Qual.
1	Ana Porgras	Romania	6.400	8.866		15.266	Q
2	Rebecca Bross	United States	6.500	8.766		15.266	Q
3	Anna Dementyeva	Russia	6.300	8.833		15.133	Q
4	Deng Linlin	China	6.500	8.600		15.100	Q
5	Lauren Mitchell	Australia	6.700	8.266		14.966	Q
6	Aliya Mustafina	Russia	6.200	8.733		14.933	Q
7	Alicia Sacramone	United States	6.000	8.866		14.866	Q
8	Aly Raisman	United States	6.200	8.566		14.766	-
9	Ksenia Afanasyeva	Russia	5.900	8.633		14.533	-
10	Yana Demyanchuk	Ukraine	6.100	8.433		14.533	Q
11	Elisabetta Preziosa	Italy	5.900	8.625		14.525	R
12	Huang Qiushuang	China	6.100	8.366		14.466	R
13	Ksenia Semenova	Russia	5.800	8.658		14.458	-
14	Marta Pihan-Kulesza	Poland	6.100	8.300		14.400	R

=== Floor exercise ===
Rank	Gymnast	Nation	D Score	E Score	Pen.	Total	Qual.
1	Aliya Mustafina	Russia	5.800	9.033		14.833	Q
2	Ksenia Afanasyeva	Russia	5.800	8.966		14.766	Q
3	Sandra Izbașa	Romania	6.000	8.766		14.766	Q
4	Sui Lu	China	5.900	8.733		14.633	Q
5	Lauren Mitchell	Australia	5.800	8.766	0.1	14.466	Q
6	Diana Chelaru	Romania	5.900	8.566		14.466	Q
7	Vanessa Ferrari	Italy	5.600	8.858		14.458	Q
8	Aly Raisman	United States	5.700	8.683		14.383	Q
9	Céline van Gerner	Netherlands	5.400	8.866		14.266	R
10	Hannah Whelan	Great Britain	5.700	8.533		14.233	R
11	Raluca Haidu	Romania	5.400	8.800		14.200	-
12	Anna Dementyeva	Russia	5.700	8.500		14.200	-
13	Rebecca Bross	United States	5.600	8.566		14.166	R
