= Louise Giblin =

British sculptor

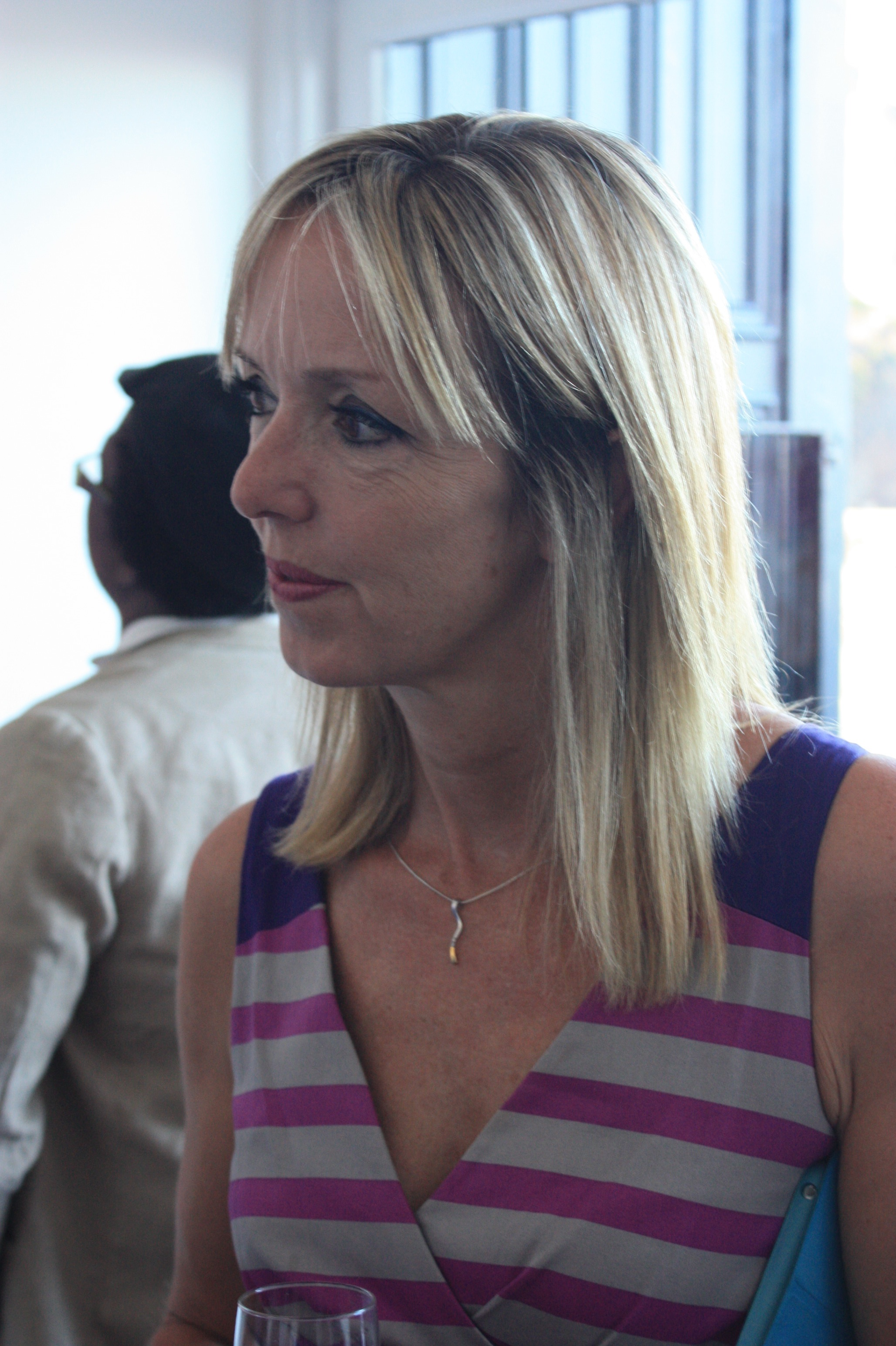
- Louise Giblin, July 2014
- Born: 1963
- Occupation: Sculptor

Louise Giblin MRSS (born 1963) is a British body-cast sculptor. She is noted in particular for her "Body-Casting Olympians" project.

== Training ==
Giblin trained under Antony Gormley and Peter Randall-Page at Brighton Polytechnic (1982–86) and at the Chelsea College of Arts (1989–93). From 1990 to 1994 she was on the Secondary Education Advisory Group within the Design Council, London. She was elected Associate of the Royal British Society of Sculptors in 2010 and was elected a full Member in 2014.

== Awards ==
Giblin was selected as the visual artist to represent the UK at the G7 of Art, part of a larger G7 of Culture in Florence, Italy.

== Olympians project ==
This project aimed to record the physiques of five British Olympians in 2011. Each subject body-cast also had a series of surface decorations pertinent to their lives. Part of the profits was donated to the Headfirst charity, which funds research into brain injuries. This project led Giblin to be called "one of the world's leading body cast sculptors".

The body-casts weigh around 10 kg and must be worn for an hour whilst setting.

The chosen subjects included Kriss Akabusi, Beth Tweddle, Kelly Holmes and Sally Gunnell.

== Living Legends project ==
This work was produced for exhibition at Gallery Different in London November 2014.

== War veterans project ==
This is an exercise in "historical memory": casting the hands and body parts of British Military personnel who have served in the many wars post World War One. The subjects include the artist's brother, Brigadier John McIntosh, who served in Bosnia. The project is planned to be exhibited until November 2018, the centenary of the last day of World War One, having begun on the centenary of the start of the war.

- 1941 WWII Wellington Bomber Flt Sgt (later Sqn Ldr) Cornelius Turner
- 1945–47 Palestine Sgt Noel Patrick
- 1951–52 Korea Gunner Bill Park
- 1970–93 Northern Ireland Maj Robbie Robertson
- 1973–75 Cold War Norway OS Lawrence Kidman
- 1976–77 Dhofar LCpl (later WO1) Julian Allerhead
- 1982 Falkland Islands Operation Corporate Mne (later Maj) David Sippitt
- 1985 Bosnia Operation Grapple (UN) Operation Resolute (NATO) Capt (later Maj) Michael Moran
- 1990–91 Gulf War Operation Granby Trooper Glenn Fitzpatrick
- 1993 Croatia Operation Hanwood Lt Col (later Maj Gen) Michael von Bertele
- 1994 Rwanda Operation Gabriel Combat Medic SSgt Nigel Partington
- 1998 Bosnia Operation Palatine Maj (later Brig) John McIntosh
- 1999 Kosovo Operation Agricola Capt (later Col) Patricia Gibson
- 2000 Sierra Leone Operation Palliser Lt Col (later Brig) Kevin Beaton
- 2005 Afghanistan Operation Fingal Capt Hitmung Gurung
- 2007 Iraq Operation Telic 10 LCoH P Smith
- 2007 Iraq SAC (T) Jon-Allan Butterworth (Paralympian Cyclist London 2012, Rio 2017)
- 2011 Libya CT (later Flt Sgt) John Kirk (Para Snow Sports Skier)

== Sources ==
- "Sport's golden girl immortalised in brass | London - ITV News". itv.com. 21 May 2012.
- "BBC News - Olympic athletes' body casts created by Louise Giblin". BBC News.
- "Olympic athletes' body casts created by Louise Giblin - Worldnews.com". article.wn.com.
- "Liverpool gymnast Beth Tweddle immortalised in bronze - Liverpool Echo". liverpoolecho.co.uk. 8 March 2013.
- "BBC News - Beth Tweddle sculpture presented to her in Liverpool". BBC News. 13 March 2013.
- "Beth Tweddle sculpture - ITV News". itv.com.
- "Paralympian cast in aluminium - ITV News". itv.com.
- "In Pictures: 'Chelsea Flower Show meets royal pregnancy' - BBC News". BBC News. 3 June 2013.
- "Olympian Series II – Beth Tweddle MBE - Museum of Liverpool, Liverpool museums". liverpoolmuseums.org.uk.
- "Arte e Polis per la X Edizione di Florence Biennale - Fermata Spettacolo" 25.10.15". 25 October 2015.
- "Ski Stars Are Cast Away - Skier and Snowboarder Magazine " 30.9.15". 30 September 2015.
- "Sculptor Louise Giblin In Bronze Hand Casts Of War Veterans – BBC News". BBC News.
- "Sculptor, Louise Giblin, has created bronze hand sculptures based on members of the British military from Sevenoaks and Tunbridge Wells - Kent Online" 13.11.14". 13 November 2014.
- "WAR VETERANS, SPORT STARS & CELEBRITIES MODEL FOR TOP BODY CAST SCULPTOR – QARANC ASSOCIATION" 5.11.14".
- "War Veterans Model For Body cast Sculptor – Army and You" 2.9.14". 2 September 2014.
- "BBC SE Today 2015 11 06 – BBC News". YouTube. 7 November 2015.
