= Gymnastics at the 2012 Summer Olympics – Women's uneven bars =

Women's uneven bars at the Games of the XXX Olympiad
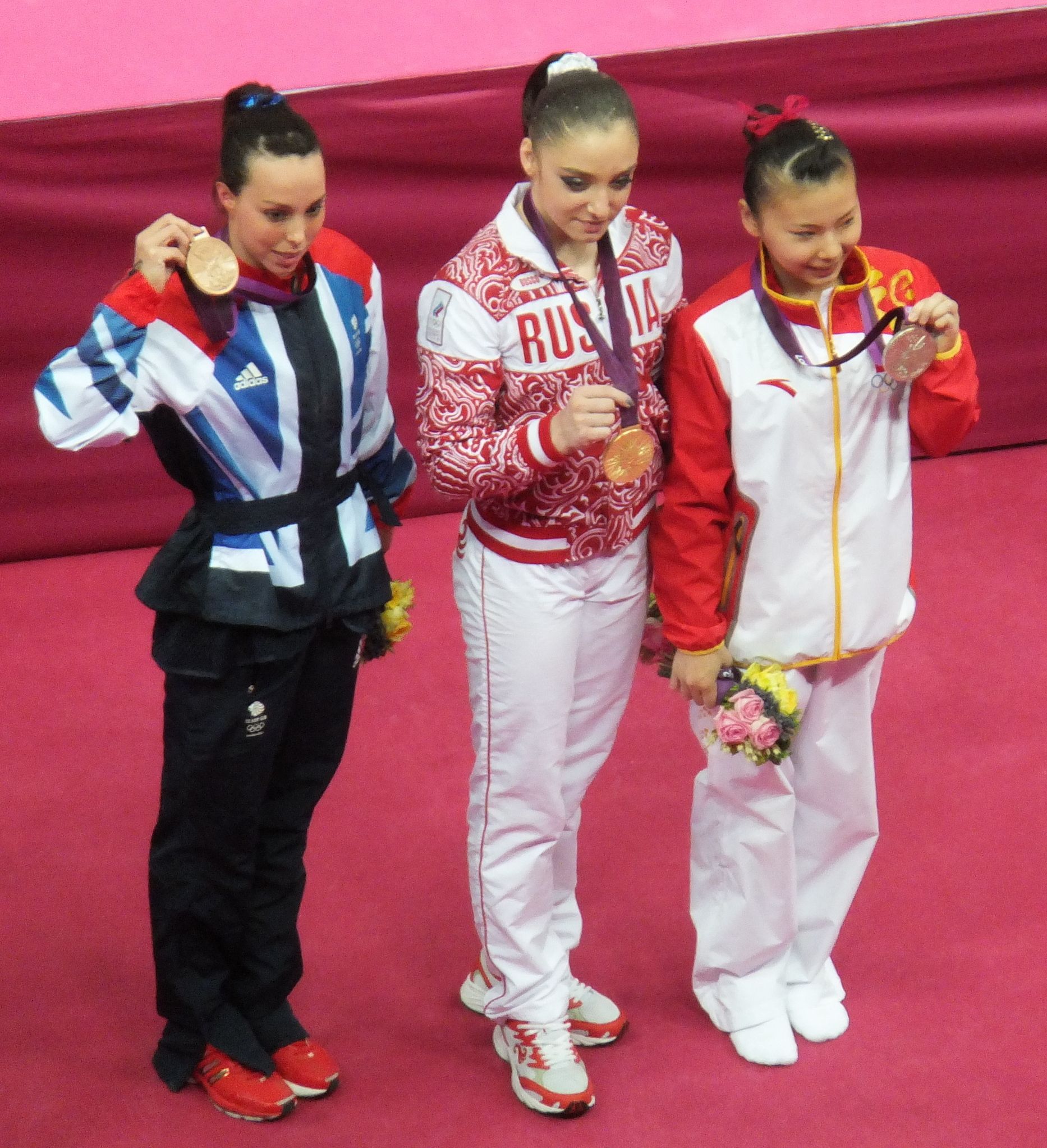
- Women's uneven bars medal ceremony (2012)
- Venue: North Greenwich Arena
- Date: 6 August
- Competitors: 8 from 6 nations
- Winning points: 16.133

Medalists
1st place, gold medalist(s)		Aliya Mustafina	Russia
2nd place, silver medalist(s)		He Kexin	China
3rd place, bronze medalist(s)		Elizabeth Tweddle	Great Britain

The women's uneven bars final at the 2012 Summer Olympics in London was held at the North Greenwich Arena on 6 August.

Aliya Mustafina of Russia won the gold medal, He Kexin of China won silver, and Beth Tweddle of Great Britain won bronze.

== Format of competition ==
The top eight competitors in the qualification phase (with a limit of two per country) advanced to the final. Qualification scores were then ignored, with only final-round scores counting.

== Qualification results ==
	Name	Country	Date of birth	Age
Youngest	Gabby Douglas	United States	31 December 1995	16 years
Oldest	Beth Tweddle	Great Britain	1 April 1985	27 years

Rank	Gymnast	Nation	D Score	E Score	Pen.	Total	Qual.
1	Beth Tweddle	Great Britain	7.000	9.133		16.133	Q
2	He Kexin	China	7.100	8.866		15.966	Q
3	Viktoria Komova	Russia	7.000	8.833		15.833	Q
4	Yao Jinnan	China	6.800	8.966		15.766	Q
5	Aliya Mustafina	Russia	7.000	8.700		15.700	Q
6	Gabby Douglas	United States	6.600	8.733		15.333	Q
7	Huang Qiushuang	China	6.600	8.666		15.266	-*
8	Elisabeth Seitz	Germany	6.700	8.466		15.166	Q
9	Kōko Tsurumi	Japan	6.600	8.433		15.033	Q
10	Céline van Gerner	Netherlands	6.200	8.666		14.866	R
11	Kyla Ross	United States	6.400	8.466		14.866	R
12	Jordyn Wieber	United States	6.400	8.433		14.833	-*
13	Rebecca Tunney	Great Britain	6.400	8.425		14.825	R

* Huang Qiushuang (CHN), ranked 7th, did not qualify to the final, and Jordyn Wieber (USA), ranked 12th, did not qualify as the 3rd reserve due to the two-per-country rule.

== Final results ==
Rank	Gymnast	Nation	D Score	E Score	Pen.	Total
1	Aliya Mustafina	Russia	7.000	9.133		16.133
2	He Kexin	China	7.100	8.833		15.933
3	Beth Tweddle	Great Britain	7.000	8.916		15.916
4	Yao Jinnan	China	6.800	8.966		15.766
5	Viktoria Komova	Russia	7.000	8.666		15.666
6	Elisabeth Seitz	Germany	6.700	8.566		15.266
7	Kōko Tsurumi	Japan	6.400	8.566		14.966
8	Gabby Douglas	United States	6.300	8.600		14.900
