= Amanda Reddin =

British gymnast and coach (born 1965)

Amanda Jayne Reddin OBE (born 6 June 1965), née Harrison, later Kirby, is a gymnastics coach, and former Olympic gymnast, for Great Britain. Personal coach of many successful gymnasts, including three-time world champion and Olympic medallist Beth Tweddle, double Olympian Hannah Whelan and Olympian Jennifer Pinches. Reddin coached for many years at the City of Liverpool Gymnastics Club. She was Head National Coach for British Gymnastics until stepping down in May 2022 just weeks before an independent review into abuse in the sport.

== Gymnastics career ==
=== 1983 World Championships ===
Harrison was a member of the Great Britain team, which placed 17th, in the 1983 World Artistic Gymnastics Championships in Budapest, Hungary.

=== 1984 Olympics ===
At age 19, Harrison competed at the 1984 Summer Olympics in Los Angeles in women's artistic gymnastics for Great Britain placing 7th in the team competition and 22nd in the all around competition.

== Coaching career ==
Kirby began her coaching career in Brighton, but soon moved to Liverpool in 1992 to coach at the City of Liverpool Gymnastics Club in Toxteth, Liverpool. Today, Reddin is a qualified FIG Brevet Coach and has coached at four Olympic Games (2000, 2004, 2008, 2012) and more than 10 World Championships.

In August 2020 Reddin agreed to temporarily step aside as Head National Coach at British Gymnastics while an investigation into claims about her conduct took place. In May 2022, she permanently stepped down.

=== Honours ===
In 2002, Kirby was named as UK Coach of the Year (jointly with Alex Stanton, coach to marathon world record holder Paula Radcliffe).

In 2004, Kirby was one of the winners in the 'Manager/Coach' category of the BBC North West Sports Awards

In 2006, Kirby was awarded the Mussabini Medal in the UK Coaching Awards.

In 2008, Kirby was nominated for the Unsung Hero award in The Sunday Times Sportswoman of the Year Awards.

She was appointed Officer of the Order of the British Empire (OBE) in the 2013 New Year Honours for services to sport.

=== The Amanda Kirby Trophy ===
In 2007, the Amanda Kirby Trophy was introduced in English Gymnastics (alongside the Beth Tweddle Trophy), in honour of her years of dedicated coaching and for producing a world champion (Beth Tweddle won the 2006 World Championships on the Asymmetric Bars). The award is made annually to the coach of the gymnast in the senior English gymnastics championships who scores the highest mark on the asymmetric bars.
