= Jennifer Pinches =

British artistic gymnast

- Full name: Jennifer Elizabeth Mary Pinches
- Nickname: Jenni
- Born: 25 May 1994 (age 32) Royal Tunbridge Wells, Kent, United Kingdom
- Height: 1.6 m (5 ft 3 in)

Gymnastics career
- Discipline: Women's artistic gymnastics
- Country represented: United Kingdom
- College team: University of California, Los Angeles
- Club: City of Liverpool
- Head coach: Valorie Kondos-Field
- Former coaches: Amanda Reddin, Claire Duffy
- Music: Paint It Black
- Retired: 2015

Jennifer Elizabeth Mary McIlveen (née Pinches) (born 25 May 1994) is a retired artistic gymnast who competed for Great Britain in the 2012 Summer Olympics in London and subsequently for the UCLA Bruins women's gymnastics team in the NCAA. In 2020, Pinches emerged as a prominent figure in the campaign against abusive coaching practices in gymnastics. becoming a co-founder of the charity Gymnasts for Change with athlete rights advocate, Claire Heafford.

== Overview ==
Pinches was born in Tunbridge Wells on 25 May 1994. She started gymnastics at six years old, attending Fromeside Gymnastics Club on the outskirts of Bristol.

Pinches began training at the Lilleshall National Sports Centre at the age of nine, and by the age of ten was ranked first in Britain in her age group.

In 2005 Pinches was the subject of an episode of the Channel 5 documentary series 'A Different Life'. "My ultimate aim is to just be in the Olympics," she said in the film.

Pinches started training at the City of Liverpool Gymnastics Club in 2006 after her family moved to the North-West of England. She received guidance there from Amanda Reddin and trained alongside Beth Tweddle and Hannah Whelan.

Pinches was a member of the British national squad throughout her elite career, competing in the World Artistic Gymnastics Championships in 2010 and 2011 and the 2012 Summer Olympics in London.

Following the Olympics, Pinches announced her retirement from elite gymnastics and completed her A level examinations at the King's School, Macclesfield. In September 2013, after a 13-month break from training, she began attending the University of California, Los Angeles and competed for the UCLA Bruins gymnastics team in the NCAA.

In 2020, Pinches began to speak out publicly against what she described as the "culture of abuse and fear" in gymnastics. In June, she drafted the first statement issued under the social media hashtag #gymnastalliance, subsequently used by many gymnasts around the world to make public statements about their own experiences of abuse in gymnastics. In December she co-founded Gymnasts for Change, a campaign to end abusive coaching and encourage the development of an 'athlete-centred' culture in gymnastics.

== Junior career ==
=== 2009 ===
In July, Pinches competed at the European Youth Olympic Festival in Tampere, Finland. She placed tenth in the all-around final with a score of 53.100.

In December, Pinches competed at the Doha Gymnasiade in Qatar, placing ninth in the all-around with a score of 52.300

== Senior career ==
=== 2010 ===
In August, Pinches competed for Great Britain against gymnasts from Switzerland in an international friendly meet in Gateshead. She placed third in the all-around competition with a score of 55.300.

In October, Pinches competed for Great Britain at the 2010 World Artistic Gymnastics Championships in Rotterdam, Netherlands. She finished 32nd in the all-around competition with a score of 53.898.

=== 2011 ===
In February, Pinches competed at the English Championships in Stoke-on-Trent. She placed second in the all-around competition with a score of 56.05.

At the beginning of April, Pinches competed at the 2011 European Artistic Gymnastics Championships in Berlin, Germany. She placed 21st all-around in qualifications.

In July, Pinches competed at the British Championships in Liverpool, placing third in the all-around competition with a score of 52.850.

In October, Pinches competed at the 2011 World Artistic Gymnastics Championships in Tokyo, Japan. She placed 37th in qualifications for the all-around competition with a score of 53.766. In the team final, she helped the British team place fifth with a balance beam score of 13.833.

=== 2012 ===
In March, Pinches won the all-around competition at the English Championships.

In May, Pinches competed at the 2012 European Women's Artistic Gymnastics Championships in Brussels, Belgium. She contributed a balance beam score of 13.000 and a floor score of 13.600 to the British team's fourth-place finish.

At the end of May, Pinches participated in the British Team Championships, which counted as the first trial for the Great Britain Olympic team. She helped her club, City of Liverpool, take first place with an all-around score of 52.850.

At the beginning of June, Pinches competed alongside other British gymnasts in an international friendly against Finland and Spain in Ipswich, which counted as the second British Olympic team trial. She placed seventh in the all-around with a score of 53.650.

At the end of June, Pinches competed at the British Championships in Liverpool. This was the third and final trial to decide which gymnasts would represent Great Britain at the Olympics. She placed second in the all-around competition with a score of 56.350. In event finals, she placed second on vault scoring 13.875, first on balance beam scoring 14.300, and seventh on floor scoring 12.500.

At the beginning of July, Pinches was selected to compete for Great Britain at the 2012 Summer Olympics.

At the end of July, Pinches competed for Great Britain at the 2012 Summer Olympics in London, United Kingdom. She helped the British team qualify to the team finals with an all-around score of 55.266. In the team final, she contributed scores of 14.833 on vault, 11.833 on balance beam, and 14.366 on floor to the British team's sixth-place finish.

In September, Pinches announced her retirement from elite gymnastics via Twitter saying, "I will no longer be doing competitive gymnastics in or for Great Britain."

== NCAA career ==
After a year away from gymnastics, during which she completed her school education and spent time in Ecuador, in September 2013 Pinches started attending the University of California, Los Angeles (UCLA) to compete for the UCLA Bruins.

Pinches had a successful freshman season during the regular season competitions, averaging to 9.731 on vault (highest at 9.80), 9.765 on floor exercise (highest at 9.875) and 9.675 on balance beam (highest at 9.675). In March 2014, Pinches competed in the 2014 Pac-12 Conference Championships. She contributed 9.775 on vault and 9.80 on floor exercise to UCLA team's 4th-place finish.

Pinches hit 31 of 32 routines during her freshman and sophomore seasons, with career-bests of 9.875 on floor and 9.85 on vault. She was a two-time scholastic All-American.

In September 2015, she medically retired due to wrist injuries. She remained on the gymnastics team as an undergraduate assistant coach for the 2016 season.

She appeared alongside many other former UCLA gymnasts in a tribute video to coach Valorie Kondos-Field (known as 'Miss Val') shown at Miss Val's final home meet as UCLA Gymnastics Head Coach in Pauley Pavilion on 16 March 2019.

== Activism ==
After watching the documentary film Athlete A, about the Larry Nassar case in the United States, Pinches co-ordinated with current and former British gymnasts to issue a statement, which she drafted, condemning abusive coaching and calling for change in the culture of gymnastics. The former British national team member Lisa Mason proposed that the statement be labelled with the hashtag #GymnastAlliance. On 29 June 2020 Pinches, along with many other British gymnasts, posted the statement on Instagram and Twitter. “We support all survivors of abuse and condemn the culture that didn’t put athlete health and wellbeing first, and allowed Nassar to act,” it said. “We stand for ethical, respectful coaching, collaborative leadership, and teamwork. Success built on trust, science and communication, not control and fearful obedience, even through pain.” Over subsequent weeks and months, current and former gymnasts in countries including Australia, Belgium, the Netherlands, the UK and the US posted statements on social media under the #gymnastalliance hashtag detailing their own experiences of mistreatment by coaches.

A week after the first #gymnastalliance post, British Gymnastics announced that there would be an independent inquiry into the allegations of abuse made against British coaches. The inquiry, headed by the barrister Anne Whyte QC and titled the Whyte Review, called for evidence in August 2020. Its interim report, published on 8 February 2021, stated that evidence had been received from nearly four hundred individuals, including 126 current and former gymnasts.

In December 2020, Pinches co-founded, with Claire Heafford, Gymnasts for Change, "a network of current and former gymnasts, as well as parents, coaches, fans and more who have come together to campaign for change, following the public revelations of widespread abuse and unsafe practices within gymnastics".

During the 2020 Olympics, she was one of many gymnasts showing their support of Simone Biles putting her health first when she pulled out of the rest of the competition after the first rotation of the Women's Team Final citing mental health reasons.

== Personal life ==
On 21 June 2021, Pinches announced that she had married her long-term boyfriend, James McIlveen, after their wedding had been delayed due to COVID-19. One of her bridesmaids was her UCLA Bruins teammate, Mikaela Gerber She appeared on the TV show "Say Yes to the Dress - Lancashire" hosted by Gok Wan selecting her wedding dress.
