= Aldana Carraro =

Argentine artistic gymnast (1994–2015)

- Full name: Aldana Huilen Carraro
- Born: 12 September 1994
- Died: 10 July 2015 (aged 20)

Gymnastics career
- Discipline: Women's artistic gymnastics
- Country represented: Argentina; (2010)

Aldana Huilen Carraro (12 September 1994 - 10 July 2015) was an Argentine female artistic gymnast and part of the national team. She participated at the 2010 World Artistic Gymnastics Championships in Rotterdam, the Netherlands.
