= Bianca Dancose-Giambattisto =

Canadian artistic gymnast

- Born: 1994 (age 31–32) Montreal, Quebec
- Height: 1.67 m (5 ft 6 in)

Gymnastics career
- Country represented: Canada (2010-12)
- College team: Florida Gators
- Club: Gym-Richelieu
- Head coach: Rhonda Faehn
- Former coaches: Michel Charron, Galina Larchina

Bianca Dancose-Giambattisto is a Canadian artistic gymnast. She was a member of the Canadian women's national gymnastics team from 2010 to 2012 and competed in college gymnastics for the University of Florida's Florida Gators gymnastics team.
