= Nadzeya Vysotskaya =

Belarusian artistic gymnast (born 1988)

Nadzeya Vsotskaya
- Full name: Nadzeya Vsotskaya
- Born: September 18, 1988 (age 37)

Gymnastics career
- Discipline: Women's artistic gymnastics
- Country represented: Belarus
- Music: Assassins Taneu

Nadzeya Vysotskaya (Belarusian: Надзея Высоцкая; born September 18, 1988) is a Belarusian artistic gymnast. She was a member of the national elite team in 2004, competing at the European Championships in Amsterdam. She competed at the 2005 World Artistic Gymnastics Championships, where she earned 21st place on the vault (8.693 points), 32nd place on balance beam (8.262), 35th place on floor exercise (8.425), and 60th place in the all-around (total of 25.749 points). The following year, in 2006, Vsotskaya competed at the European Championships in Volos, Greece. Her best single score, 13.562 on vault, placed her 16th in that event. She also earned 47th place on floor exercise (12.875) and 49th place on balance beam (13.050), and her all-around score was 39.700 placing her in 60th place once again. Vsotskaya's scores contributed to the Belarusian team's total of 157.650, which earned them 14th place.

In May 2006, at the Gymnastics World Cup in Ghent, Vsotskaya tested positive for the use of furosemide, a banned diuretic. She had placed 11th on vault and floor, and 14th on beam, but the Fédération Internationale de Gymnastique issued a ban effective May 15, 2006 through December 31, 2007.
