= Beth Tweddle =

English artistic gymnast (born 1985)

Elizabeth Tweddle MBE
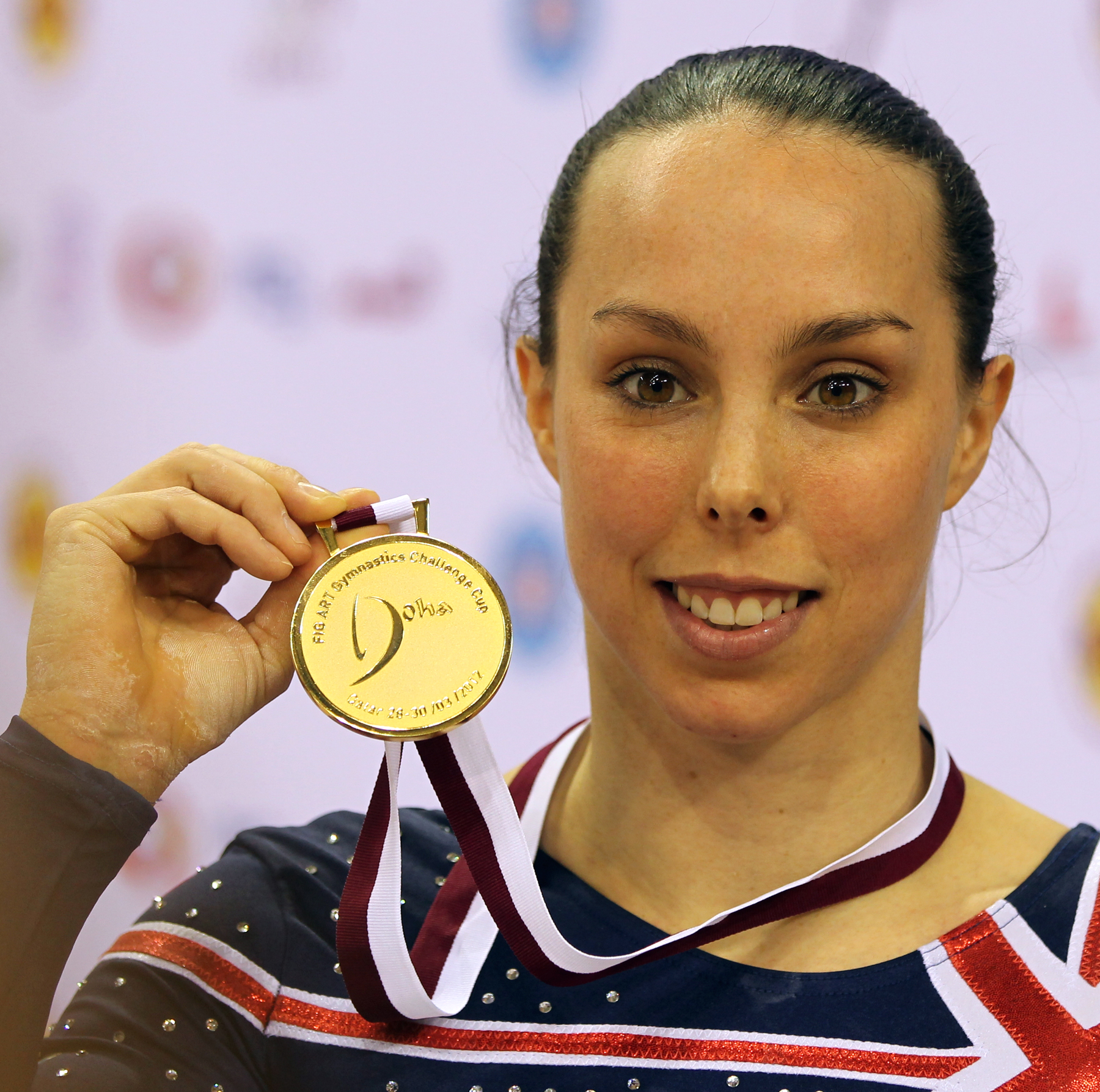
- Tweddle in March 2012

Personal information
- Full name: Elizabeth Kimberly Tweddle
- Born: 1 April 1985 (age 41) Johannesburg, South Africa
- Height: 160 cm (5 ft 3 in)

Gymnastics career
- Discipline: Women's artistic gymnastics
- Country represented: (United Kingdom) Great Britain; England (1994–2013)
- Club: City of Liverpool
- Head coach: Amanda Reddin
- Assistant coach: Zoltan Jordanov
- Choreographer: Corina Morosan, Adriana Pop
- Eponymous skills: Tweddle: sole circle backward with counter straddle hecht with 1/2 turn on high bar in mixed L-grip
- Retired: 6 August 2013
Medal record
Event	1st	2nd	3rd
Olympic Games	0	0	1
World Championships	3	0	2
European Championships	6	4	1
World Cup Final	1	2	0
Summer Universiade	3	0	2
Commonwealth Games	1	2	0
Total	14	8	6
Representing Great Britain
Olympic Games
Bronze medal – third place	2012 London	Uneven Bars
World Championships
Gold medal – first place	2006 Aarhus	Uneven Bars
Gold medal – first place	2009 London	Floor Exercise
Gold medal – first place	2010 Rotterdam	Uneven Bars
Bronze medal – third place	2003 Anaheim	Uneven Bars
Bronze medal – third place	2005 Melbourne	Uneven Bars
World Cup Final
Gold medal – first place	2006 São Paulo	Uneven Bars
Silver medal – second place	2004 Birmingham	Uneven Bars
Silver medal – second place	2006 São Paulo	Floor Exercise
European Championships
Gold medal – first place	2006 Volos	Uneven Bars
Gold medal – first place	2009 Milan	Uneven Bars
Gold medal – first place	2009 Milan	Floor Exercise
Gold medal – first place	2010 Birmingham	Uneven Bars
Gold medal – first place	2010 Birmingham	Floor Exercise
Gold medal – first place	2011 Berlin	Uneven Bars
Silver medal – second place	2004 Amsterdam	Uneven Bars
Silver medal – second place	2007 Amsterdam	Floor Exercise
Silver medal – second place	2008 Clermont	Floor Exercise
Silver medal – second place	2010 Birmingham	Team
Bronze medal – third place	2002 Patras	Uneven Bars
Summer Universiade
Gold medal – first place	2005 İzmir	Uneven Bars
Gold medal – first place	2009 Belgrade	Uneven Bars
Gold medal – first place	2009 Belgrade	Floor Exercise
Bronze medal – third place	2005 İzmir	All-Around
Bronze medal – third place	2005 İzmir	Balance Beam
Representing England
Commonwealth Games
Gold medal – first place	2002 Manchester	Uneven Bars
Silver medal – second place	2002 Manchester	Team
Silver medal – second place	2002 Manchester	All-Around

Elizabeth Kimberly Tweddle (born 1 April 1985) is a retired English artistic gymnast. Renowned for her uneven bar and floor routines, she was the first female gymnast from Great Britain to win a medal at the European Championships, World Championships, and Olympic Games. Tweddle, known for her consistency and longevity as an elite gymnast, is regarded as a pioneer of the renaissance of British gymnastics at the beginning of the twenty-first century that saw the country's gymnastics programme progress from 'also ran' to consistent global competitiveness, and along with peers such as Vanessa Ferrari of Italy and Isabelle Severino of France, helped begin a period of significant success for western European gymnasts globally.

Tweddle represented Great Britain at three Olympic Games. She is the 2012 Olympic bronze medalist on uneven bars, the 2006 and 2010 World Champion on the uneven bars, the 2009 World Champion on floor exercise, a four-time European Champion on the uneven bars, and a two-time European Champion on the floor exercise. She is a Commonwealth Games gold medalist, and a three-time champion in the Universiade.

Tweddle retired in August 2013. Following retirement, Tweddle took on a variety of media and sporting work. On 10 March 2013, she won the eighth series of Dancing on Ice along with Daniel Whiston, who won the show for the third time. In 2014, she took part in the ninth and (at the time) last series of Dancing on Ice, the "All-Stars" series, with her new skating partner Łukasz Różycki, making the final and coming third.

In 2016, Tweddle participated in the third series of Channel 4 reality contest show The Jump. However, on 7 February, two weeks into the show, Tweddle suffered a back injury and withdrew. It was reported on 8 February 2016 that she had undergone successful surgery to fuse two vertebrae. As of 2023, she remains a regular analyst on her sport for the BBC and Eurosport.

In 2025, she was inducted into the International Gymnastics Hall of Fame.

== Early life and education ==
Tweddle was born on 1 April 1985 in Johannesburg, South Africa and moved with her family to Bunbury, Cheshire, England when she was 18 months old. After trying several different sports, Tweddle began competing in gymnastics at the age of seven at Crewe and Nantwich Gymnastics Club. In 1997, she moved to the City of Liverpool Gymnastics Club to train with coach Amanda Reddin.

Tweddle attended The Queen's School, Chester and completed a foundation degree with the University of Liverpool. In 2007, she graduated from Liverpool John Moores University with a degree in sports science. She was accepted to the University of Liverpool's physiotherapy programme and began to attend after the 2012 Summer Olympics. Tweddle is also involved with Total Gymnastics. She said, "I have a sports science degree, and I'll be continuing my studies in the future – I have place at the University of Liverpool to study Physiotherapy in 2012. I've also started Total Gymnastics with the help of former Olympic swimmer Steve Parry. We go into schools and leisure centres to help give children a chance to try gymnastics – which I'm enjoying because so many gymnastics clubs are overbooked.". Tweddle is a keen football fan and is a supporter of Chester F.C. She is also a patron of Alder Hey Children's Hospital charity.

== Senior career ==
=== 2001 ===
At the end of October, Tweddle competed at the World Championships in Ghent, Belgium. She helped the British team place ninth and individually she placed twenty-fourth in the all around final with a score of 34.892.

=== 2002 ===
In April, Tweddle competed at the European Championships in Patras, Greece. She helped the British team place sixth and individually she placed fourteenth in the all around final with a score of 34.242. In event finals, she placed third on uneven bars with a score of 9.287. This was the first medal ever won by a female British gymnast at the European Championships. Tweddle said, "When I saw my name on the scoreboard in third place I just started to cry and couldn't stop. I'm just so happy."

In July, Tweddle competed for England at the 2002 Commonwealth Games in Manchester, United Kingdom. She placed second in the all around final with a score of 36.387. In event finals, she placed seventh on vault scoring 8.887 and first on uneven bars scoring 9.550.

In November, Tweddle competed at the World Championships in Debrecen, Hungary. She placed fourth on uneven bars scoring 9.312.

=== 2003 ===
In August, Tweddle competed at the World Championships in Anaheim, United States. She placed third in the uneven bars final with a score of 9.512.

In October, Tweddle competed at the World Cup event in Glasgow, United Kingdom. She placed first on uneven bars scoring 9.450 and third on balance beam scoring 8.800.

In November, Tweddle competed at the World Cup event in Stuttgart, Germany. She placed second on uneven bars with a score of 9.475.

=== 2004 ===
In March, Tweddle competed at the World Cup event in Cottbus, Germany. She placed first on uneven bars scoring 9.587.

Later in March, Tweddle competed at the World Cup event in Lyon, France. She placed first on uneven bars with a score of 9.500.

In April, Tweddle competed at the European Championships in Amsterdam, the Netherlands. She placed eleventh in the all around final with a score of 35.124 and second in the uneven bars final with a score of 9.587.

==== Athens Olympics ====
In August, Tweddle competed at the 2004 Summer Olympics in Athens, Greece. She contributed an all around score of 36.912 toward the British team's eleventh-place finish. In the all around final, Tweddle placed nineteenth with a score of 35.761.

=== 2005 ===
In February, Tweddle competed at the World Cup event in New York City, United States. She placed fourth on uneven bars scoring 9.487 and third on floor scoring 9.412.

In May, Tweddle competed at the World Cup event in Paris, France. She placed second on uneven bars scoring 9.450 and seventh on floor scoring 8.225.

In October, Tweddle competed at the World Cup event in Glasgow, United Kingdom. She placed first on uneven bars scoring 9.687, third on balance beam scoring 9.012, and first on floor scoring 9.475.

In November, Tweddle competed at the World Championships in Melbourne, Australia. She placed fourth in the all around final with a score of 36.936 and third in the uneven bars final with a score of 9.575.

=== 2006 ===
In March, Tweddle injured her right ankle and was unable to compete in the 2006 Commonwealth Games. She said, "It's a big disappointment as I was looking forward to the Games but as team captain I'll stay in Melbourne and cheer the team on. It will be difficult watching but I'll have to put the injury behind me now. We were doing podium training when I landed badly after a vault. I knew straight away that something was wrong. The injury is not too severe it is a bruised bone and the doctors have said I will be back in time for the Europeans in April. In the back of my mind I was still hoping to do bars but the doctors advised me to leave it if I wanted to be fit for the Europeans. The Beijing Olympics are still in the back of my mind but I've still not decided whether I will carry on yet."

In April, Tweddle competed at the European Championships in Volos, Greece. She won the uneven bars final with a score of 16.050. Her victory was the first at a European Championships for a British gymnast.

In July, Tweddle competed at the British Championships in Guildford, United Kingdom. She won the all around competition with a score of 60.750. In event finals, she placed first on uneven bars scoring 15.850, first on balance beam scoring 14.850, and first on floor scoring 15.350.

In October, Tweddle competed at the World Championships in Aarhus, Denmark. She placed eighth in the all around final with a score of 59.450. In event finals, she placed first on uneven bars scoring 16.200 and fourth on floor scoring 15.425. Her gold medal was the first Britain ever earned at a World Championships. Tweddle said, "I knew that I could do the routine, it was just whether I could pull it out for that moment. I went into the gym on Friday morning and did exactly the same routine as I would do that night. I went through first time and that brought my confidence back up again, and my coach knew that from then on she just had to keep me calm and let me get on with it. All my hard work has finally paid off and I'm absolutely ecstatic. A lot of people told me it would come, but I didn't think it ever actually would. It hasn't sunk in yet. I've had the bronze medal at the last two world championships and to come out today after the fall yesterday and get through it is an achievement. I didn't know if I'd win because I hadn't seen Liukin's routine, but I've seen her in training and she was pretty spectacular."

In November, Tweddle competed at the World Cup event in Glasgow, United Kingdom. She placed first on uneven bars scoring 16.025 and seventh on floor scoring 14.550.

In December, Tweddle competed at the World Cup final in São Paulo, Brazil. She placed first on uneven bars scoring 16.300 and second on floor scoring 15.200.

At the end of the year, Tweddle was nominated for, and finished in third place, for the 2006 BBC Sports Personality of the Year, the only British gymnast ever to make the short list for the award.

=== 2007 ===
In January, Tweddle had surgery on her shoulder.

In April, she competed at the European Championships in Amsterdam, the Netherlands. She placed second in the floor final with score of 15.250. Tweddle said, "It was quite hard, but it was a case of not competing at Europeans, or do a couple of events and getting back on the international stage again. Obviously, later in the year is more important than this. It wasn't worth pushing the injury, which could make it worse for later in the year."

In July, Tweddle competed at the British Championships in Guildford, United Kingdom. She won the all around competition for the seventh straight time with a score of 59.750. In event finals, she placed first on uneven bars scoring 16.350. Tweddle said, "It's a bit spooky to win my seventh title on the seventh of the seventh 2007. I was really happy with how things went today. I made the decision to alter my second floor tumble just to help my foot and make sure I didn't injure it before the Worlds, but everything else was fine."

In September, Tweddle competed at the World Championships in Stuttgart, Germany. She contributed an uneven bars score of 14.175 toward the British team's seventh-place finish, meaning that they qualified a full team to the Olympics. In event finals, she placed fourth on uneven bars scoring 16.125 and seventh on floor scoring 14.900.

In November, Tweddle competed at the World Cup event in Glasgow, United Kingdom. She placed seventh on uneven bars scoring 14.025 and first on floor scoring 14.550. Tweddle said, "I went for broke with my bars routine as I wasn't happy with my qualifying routine. I know that I would have to be perfect if I want to get gold at the Olympics next year."

=== 2008 ===
In April 2008, Tweddle competed at the European Championships in Clermont-Ferrand, France. She contributed a score of 16.075 on uneven bars toward the British team's sixth-place finish. In event finals, she placed fourth on uneven bars scoring 15.475 and second on floor scoring 15.525.

In June, Tweddle competed at the British Championships in Guildford, United Kingdom. She placed second on uneven bars with a score of 14.550 and was unable to compete on any other apparatus due to an ankle injury. She said, "I've only been able to train on the bars for the past couple of weeks so I've had to do a lot of visualisation with the other apparatus. But hopefully this week I'll be able to train on the floor, beam and vault. I've had a few ankle injuries before so it's just a case of having physio, doing lots of exercises and just keeping on top of it. It's just a case of working with it and looking after it." Afterwards, Tweddle was selected to compete for the United Kingdom at the 2008 Summer Olympics. She said, "I'm really excited and just looking forward to getting there and doing the best job I can."

==== Beijing Olympics ====
In August, Tweddle competed at the 2008 Summer Olympics in Beijing, China. She contributed scores of 15.650 on uneven bars and 14.950 on floor toward the British team's ninth-place finish. In the uneven bars final, she placed fourth with a score of 16.625. Tweddle said, "I'm going to continue, I don't see myself quitting now, although I will have some time off. I was pleased just to be in the final. My dismount is normally not a problem but I just didn't get enough height and to be honest I thought I was going to end up on my face. My dream has been to be in the final. Now I'll have to leave it to London in 2012 to get a medal. I came into this final in last place, so I just had to go out there and do it and I am pleased with my performance. It was a good result, I am not disappointed with fourth."

=== 2009 ===
After the Beijing Olympics, Tweddle decide to concentrate her training on uneven bars and floor. She said, "I thought I would retire this year but then I was so close in Beijing that there is still some unfinished business. Now I don't really know when I'll stop. To be honest 2012 is in my sights now which it wasn't this time last year. We will just have to see how my body holds up but that's the goal. As long as I'm still enjoying it and still up there challenging then I'll keep going. I want to try to prove everyone wrong and get that Olympic medal. I've been working closely with both my coach and my physio to keep my body going. My training has changed a lot and I only do bars and floor seriously now. Beam and vault are the ones which hurt my feet and I can't really upgrade enough to be up there to contend for the all around anymore. I've also changed my training partner and now I train with Hannah Whelan. The variety has given me a new lease of life."

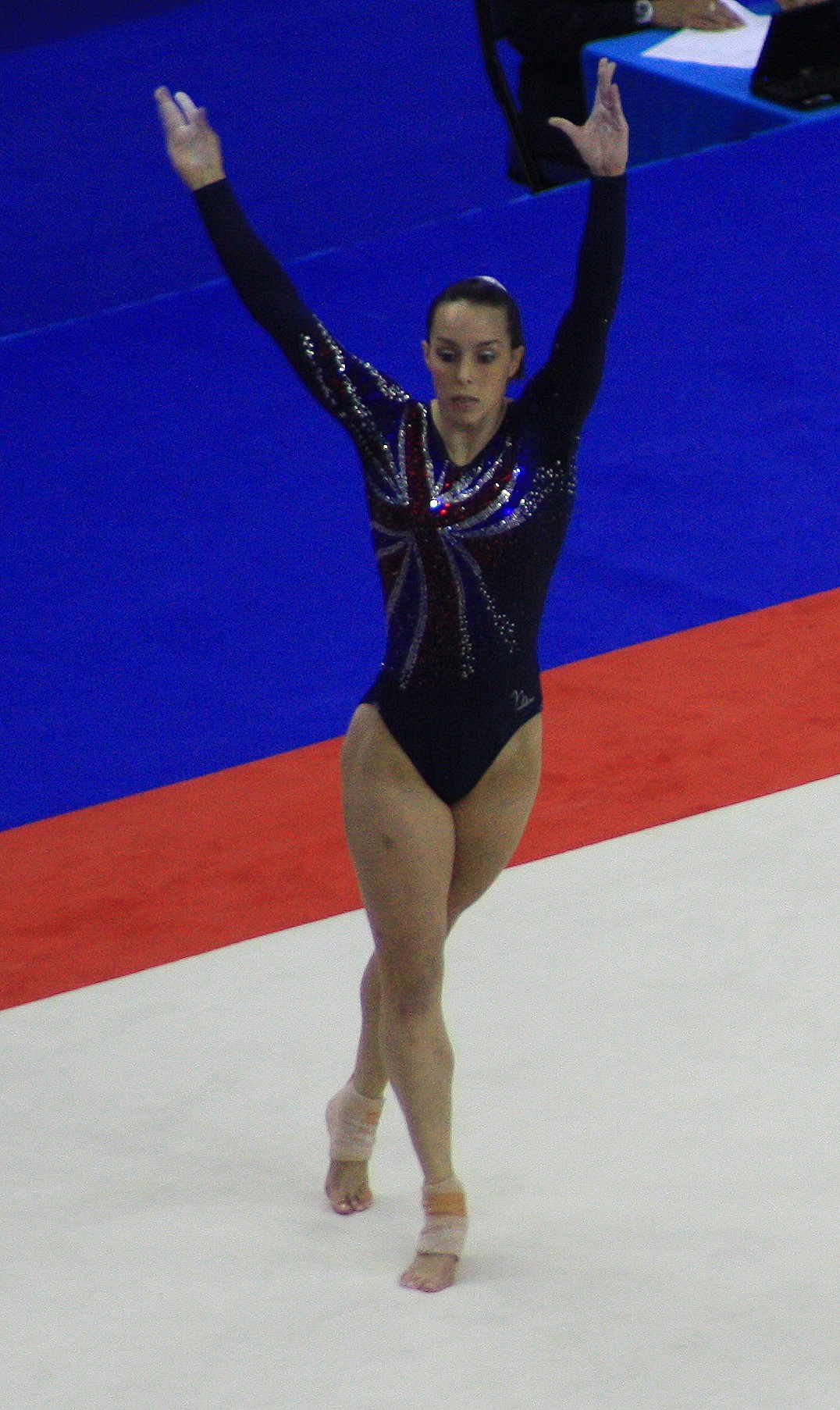
Tweddle during her win in the floor final of the 2009 World Championships

In April, Tweddle competed at the European Championships in Milan, Italy. In event finals, she placed first on uneven bars scoring 15.575 and first on floor scoring 15.150. Tweddle said, "It is nice to be back. Since 2006 I have had my share of fourth positions, and all week I have been so focused on getting everything right. I was a touch short on the Tkatchev-half, and I think it was pure determination that got me through."

In May, Tweddle competed at the World Cup event in Glasgow, United Kingdom. She placed first on uneven bars scoring 15.275 and first on floor scoring 14.900.

Later in May, Tweddle participated at the British Teams competition in Guildford, United Kingdom. She contributed scores of 15.700 on uneven bars and 15.450 on floor toward her club, City of Liverpool's, first-place finish.

In October, Tweddle competed at the World Championships in London, United Kingdom. She won the floor final with a score of 14.650. Tweddle said, "I was renowned for bars. This is my first medal in floor and it's the best feeling ever."

=== 2010 ===
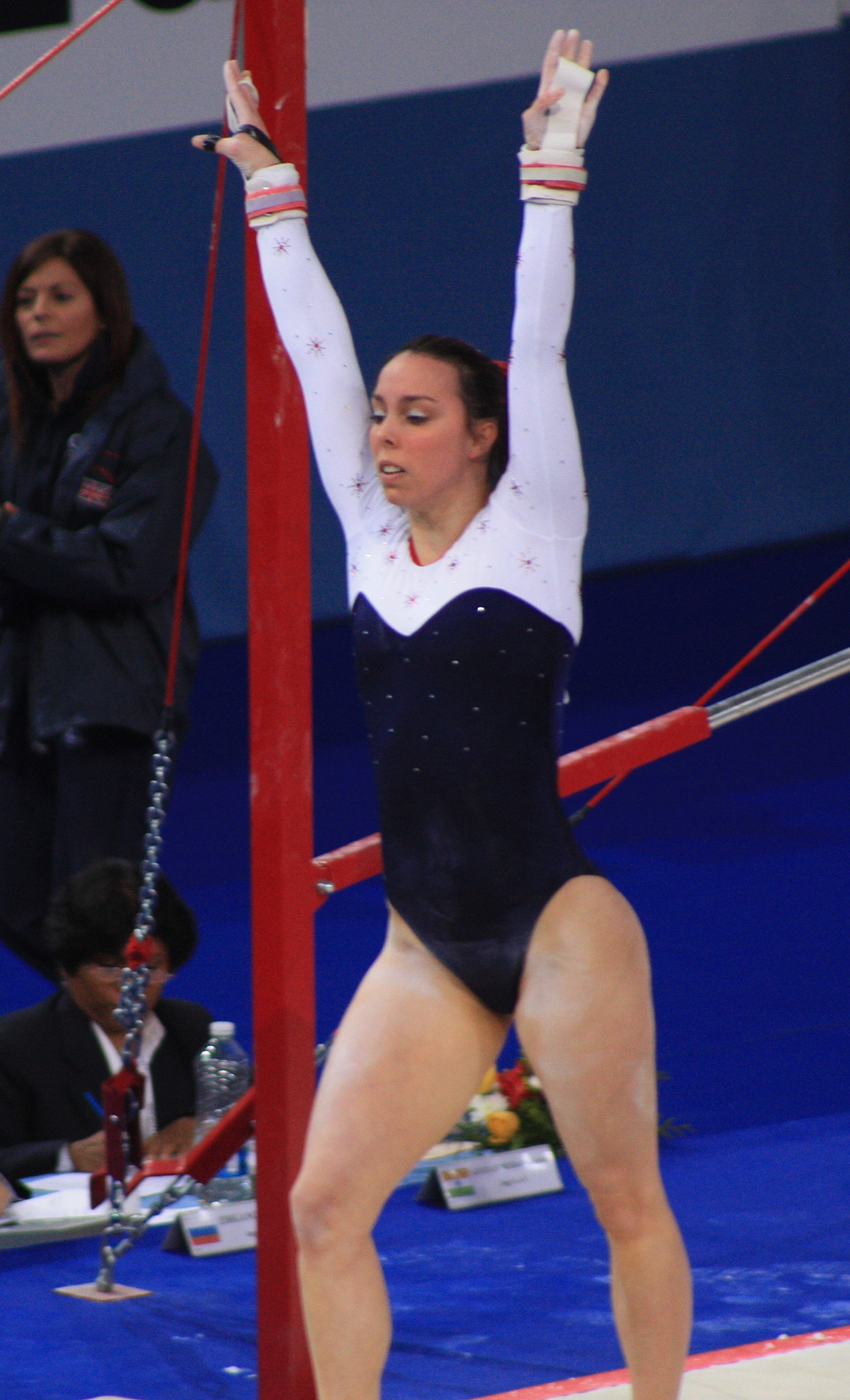
Tweddle in 2010 at the Paris World Cup

In April 2010, Tweddle competed at the World Cup event in Paris, France. She placed second on uneven bars scoring 15.650 and first on floor scoring 15.025.

In May, Tweddle competed at the European Championships in Birmingham, United Kingdom. She contributed scores of 15.850 on uneven bars and 14.925 on floor toward the British team's second-place finish. In event finals, she placed first on uneven bars scoring 15.875 and first on floor scoring 14.825.

In July, Tweddle competed at the British Championships in Guildford, United Kingdom. She placed first on uneven bars with a score of 15.000.

In October, Tweddle competed at the World Championships in Rotterdam, The Netherlands. She contributed scores of 15.733 on uneven bars and 14.666 on floor toward the British team's seventh-place finish. In event finals, she placed first on uneven bars with a score of 15.733. Tweddle said, "It means everything to me to regain the bars title. I have worked so hard day in day out in the gym for this so I'm very proud. I wasn't watching the previous routines but from the noise of the crowd I could tell the two Chinese girls ahead of me had fallen and so I tried to remain calm, but knew at that point that if I went clean I had a great chance of winning the title."

Tweddle was appointed Member of the Order of the British Empire (MBE) in the 2010 New Year Honours. She said, "It's been totally surreal to get an MBE. I didn't really believe it at first. I waited for the letter telling me I was coming to the palace before I did. I was surprisingly quite nervous before the ceremony – I was worried about tripping up when I walked in. Everyone kept saying to me 'you are not going to cartwheel in'. I train to win gymnastic medals but away from gymnastics the MBE is a massive honour."

=== 2011 ===
In April, Tweddle competed at the European Championships in Berlin, Germany despite having an injured shin. In event finals, she placed first on uneven bars scoring 15.100 and fourth on floor scoring 14.300.

In May, Tweddle participated in the British Team Championships in Guildford, United Kingdom. She contributed scores of 14.900 on uneven bars and 14.300 on floor toward her club, City of Liverpool's, first-place finish.

In July, Tweddle competed at the British Championships in Liverpool, United Kingdom. She placed first on uneven bars scoring 15.200 and first on floor scoring 15.250.

In October, Tweddle competed at the World Championships in Tokyo, Japan. She contributed scores of 15.666 on uneven bars and 14.533 on floor toward the British team's fifth-place finish. This was the team's highest placement ever and qualified a full team for the Olympics. In the floor final, Tweddle placed seventh with a score of 14.500. She said, "The week has been a great success as we achieved our number one aim and we've got the British women's team qualified for 2012 so that's now the focus."

=== 2012 ===
In March, Tweddle competed at the World Cup event in Doha, Qatar. She won the uneven bars final with a score of 15.175.

In April, Tweddle had keyhole surgery on her knee and was unable to compete at the European Championships in May. She said, "I'm disappointed not to be in a position to attend the European's but also thankful that this gives me the opportunity to get myself fully fit and ready for the rest of the season, certainly it's much better for this process to happen now rather than later in the year! I am very much still in the gym every day and will continue to work alongside the British Gymnastics medical team to ensure I manage my recovery. The line-up for the European Championship demonstrates the strength in depth that we have, and I'm sure the girls will do a great job in Brussels."

In June, Tweddle competed at the British Championships in Liverpool, United Kingdom. She won the uneven bars final with a score of 15.850.

At the beginning of July, Tweddle was selected to compete for the United Kingdom at the 2012 Summer Olympics. She said, "It is of course a massive honour to be selected to Team GB for the Olympic Games. This is my third Olympics and with it being on home soil it's definitely the most special. The build-up has been totally different and you really feel the support of the whole country. Everyone knows everything about the Games this year and people are really interested in all the events and all the team members. From Beijing to here has been a long journey. After 2008 I wasn't even sure I would carry on, but the huge support for London and the enthusiasm of the public has really motivated me and inspired me to carry on training hard. Everything about competing in the Olympic Games is exciting, the moment you get the official letter, the kitting out, the multi-sport atmosphere, it's all a huge honour to be a part of and I can't wait."

==== London Olympics ====
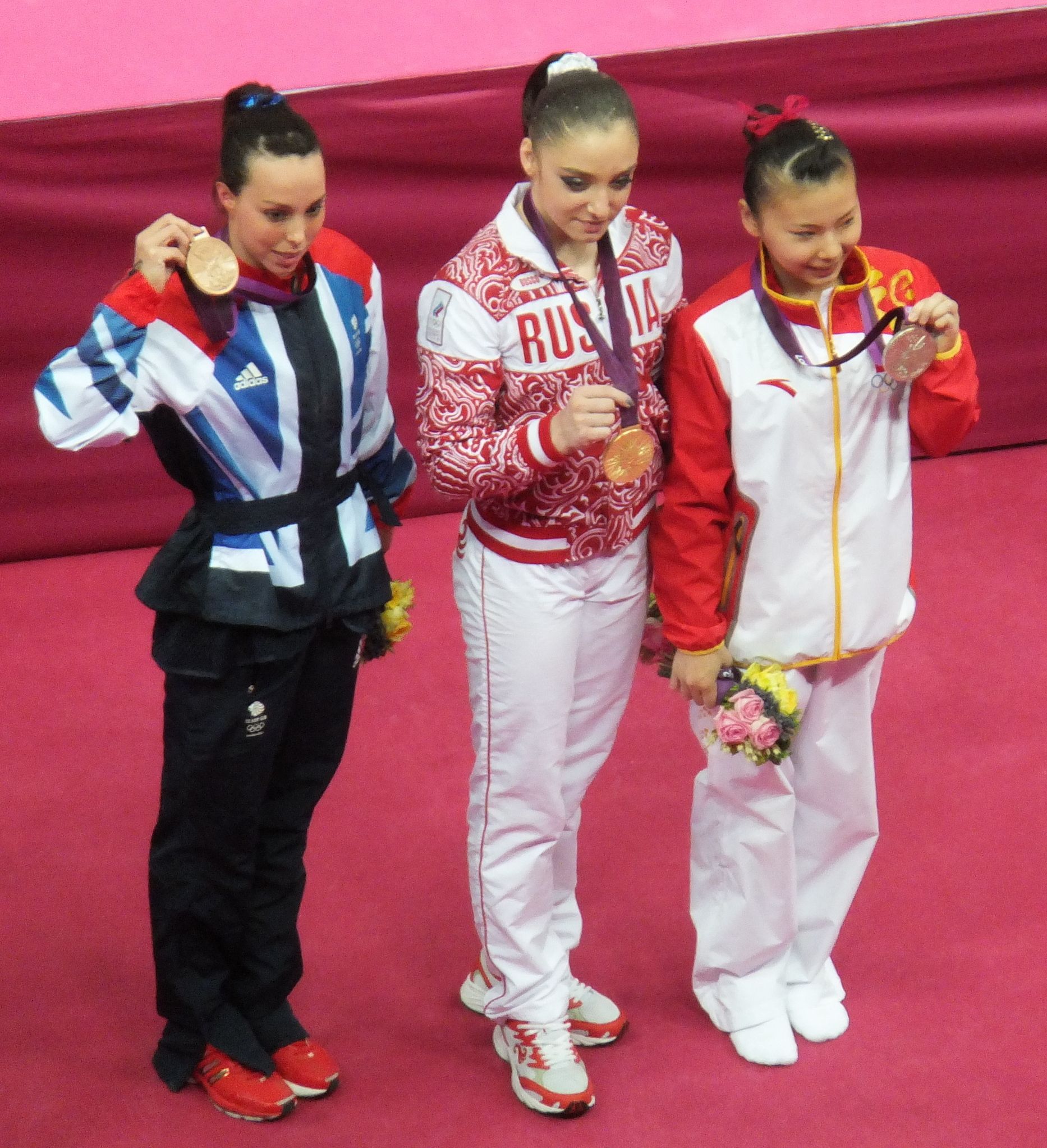
Tweddle (left) with the uneven bars medalists at the 2012 London Olympics

At the end of July, Tweddle competed at the 2012 Summer Olympics in London, United Kingdom. During qualifications Tweddle helped Great Britain advance to the team final in fifth place and individually she qualified to the uneven bars final in first place and was the first reserve for the floor exercise final.

During the team final Tweddle contributed scores of 15.833 on the uneven bars and 14.166 on floor exercise toward the British team's sixth-place finish.

In the uneven bars final, Tweddle won the bronze medal with a score of 15.916, finishing behind Aliya Mustafina of Russia and reigning Olympic champion on the event He Kexin of China. She said, "It's the best feeling in the world to win the bronze medal, there was one point today I thought I'd end in 4th like in Beijing 08, so I'm really happy. This was the one medal missing from my collection; this is the one I really wanted. I tried to keep calm and do what I do best and the crowd were amazing, as soon as I walked into the arena it was incredible. I haven't made any future plans yet, I definitely won't be in Rio but I'm happy to go home now and have a bit of a holiday and get back into the gym; if my heart's in it I will continue. I had a step on my dismount but at the end of the day I had to go for the difficult dismount to challenge for a medal. To be honest I could say 'what if' but I'm not disappointed in the slightest, any medal, any colour is what I always said I wanted, so I'm extremely happy."

=== Post-retirement ===
Tweddle retired in August 2013, saying "It's been a hard decision. Gymnastics has been and always will be a massive part of my life. Following the Olympics I've had a lot of projects on and recently I've had a bit more time to get back into the gym and decide whether I could put 100% into it. I know now deep down that I can't commit to the hours and training to remain at the very top. I don't think my achievements will ever really sink in but, when I do look back, I can be very proud of what I've done and how I've done it." Sebastian Coe labelled her "an inspiration and a role model for a generation", saying she had set a new bar for British gymnastics.

Tweddle regularly works for the BBC as an analyst for gymnastics events. She has worked on the Glasgow 2014, Gold Coast 2018 and Birmingham 2022 Commonwealth Games. In addition, she has worked on the Rio 2016, Tokyo 2020 and Paris 2024 Olympic Games. Tweddle has also worked on Gymnastics World Championships and European Gymnastics Championships for the BBC.

Following retirement, Tweddle took on a variety of media and sporting work. On 10 March 2013, she won the eighth series of Dancing on Ice along with Daniel Whiston, who won the show for the third time. In 2014, she took part in the ninth and (at the time) last series of Dancing on Ice, the "All-Stars" series, with her new skating partner Łukasz Różycki, making the final and coming third.

In 2016, Tweddle participated in the third series of Channel 4 reality contest show The Jump. However, on 7 February, two weeks into the show, Tweddle suffered a back injury and withdrew. It was reported on 8 February 2016 that she had undergone successful surgery to fuse two vertebrae.

== Competitive history ==
Results as per Tweddle's official competition record at the International Gymnastics Federation athlete profile page.

Year	Competition description	Location	Apparatus	Rank-final	Score-final	Rank-qualifying	Score-qualifying
2001	World Championships	Ghent	All Around	24	34.892	23	35.061
2001	World Championships	Ghent	Team			9	138.671
2002	World Championships	Debrecen	Uneven Bars	4	9.312	5	9.387
2002	European Championships	Patras	All Around	14	34.242	7	35.686
2002	European Championships	Patras	Balance Beam	7	8.550		
2002	European Championships	Patras	Team	6	102.772		
2002	European Championships	Patras	Uneven Bars	3	9.287		
2003	World Championships	Anaheim	Team			9	143.046
2003	World Championships	Anaheim	Uneven Bars	3	9.512		
2003	World Cup	Stuttgart	Uneven Bars	2	9.475		
2003	World Cup	Paris	Balance Beam			15	8.250
2003	World Cup	Paris	Uneven Bars	2	9.450	2	9.400
2003	World Cup	Cottbus	Uneven Bars	1	9.400	1	9.375
2003	World Cup	Glasgow	Balance Beam	3	8.800		
2003	World Cup	Glasgow	Uneven Bars	1	9.450		
2004	Olympic Games	Athens	All Around	19	35.761	19	36.912
2004	Olympic Games	Athens	Team			11	145.797
2004	European Championships	Amsterdam	All Around	11	35.124		
2004	European Championships	Amsterdam	Team	5	107.009		
2004	European Championships	Amsterdam	Uneven Bars	2	9.587		
2004	World Cup	Cottbus	Balance Beam			10	8.600
2004	World Cup	Cottbus	Uneven Bars	1	9.587	2	9.550
2004	World Cup	Lyon	Uneven Bars	1	9.500	2	9.400
2004	World Cup Final	Birmingham	Floor Exercise	5	9.550		
2004	World Cup Final	Birmingham	Uneven Bars	2	9.612		
2004	World Cup	Glasgow	Floor Exercise	3	9.475		
2004	World Cup	Glasgow	Uneven Bars	2	9.450		
2004	World Cup	Glasgow	Vault	4	8.912		
2005	World Championships	Melbourne	All Around	4	36.936	4	36.937
2005	World Championships	Melbourne	Balance Beam	18			8.800
2005	World Championships	Melbourne	Floor Exercise			5	9.425
2005	World Championships	Melbourne	Uneven Bars	3	9.575	3	9.537
2005	World Cup	Paris	Floor Exercise	7	8.225		
2005	World Cup	Paris	Uneven Bars	2	9.450		
2005	European Championships	Debrecen	All Around	24	9.175	2	36.725
2005	World Cup	Ghent	Floor Exercise	4	9.100		
2005	World Cup	Ghent	Uneven Bars	1	9.600		
2005	World Cup	New York	Floor Exercise	3	9.412		
2005	World Cup	New York	Uneven Bars	4	9.487		
2005	World Cup	Glasgow	Balance Beam	3	9.012		
2005	World Cup	Glasgow	Floor Exercise	1	9.475		
2005	World Cup	Glasgow	Uneven Bars	1	9.687		
2006	World Championships	Aarhus	All Around	8	59.450	4	59.975
2006	World Championships	Aarhus	Balance Beam			29	14.800
2006	World Championships	Aarhus	Floor Exercise	4	15.425	6	15.100
2006	World Championships	Aarhus	Team			11	226.575
2006	World Championships	Aarhus	Uneven Bars	1	16.200	5	15.675
2006	World Cup	Glasgow	Floor Exercise	7	14.550		
2006	World Cup	Glasgow	Uneven Bars	1	16.025		
2006	European Championships	Volos	All Around	98			15.850
2006	European Championships	Volos	Team	7	162.725	7	167.225
2006	European Championships	Volos	Uneven Bars	1	16.050	1	15.850
2006	World Cup Final	São Paulo	Floor Exercise	2	15.200		
2006	World Cup Final	São Paulo	Uneven Bars	1	16.300		
2007	World Championships	Stuttgart	All Around	11	58.725	4	60.775
2007	World Championships	Stuttgart	Balance Beam			25	14.925
2007	World Championships	Stuttgart	Floor Exercise	7	14.900	3	15.250
2007	World Championships	Stuttgart	Team	7	169.175	6	233.025
2007	World Championships	Stuttgart	Uneven Bars	4	16.125	3	16.075
2007	World Cup	Glasgow	Floor Exercise	1	14.550		
2007	World Cup	Glasgow	Uneven Bars	7	14.025		
2007	European Championships	Amsterdam	All Around	82			14.725
2007	European Championships	Amsterdam	Floor Exercise	2	15.250	5	14.725
2008	Olympic Games	Beijing	Team			9	232.425
2008	Olympic Games	Beijing	All Around			80	30.700
2008	Olympic Games	Beijing	Uneven Bars	4	16.625	8	15.650
2008	European Championships	Clermont-Ferrand	All Around			77	31.400
2008	European Championships	Clermont-Ferrand	Floor Exercise	2	15.525	2	15.475
2008	European Championships	Clermont-Ferrand	Team	6	174.050	5	174.050
2008	European Championships	Clermont-Ferrand	Uneven Bars	4	15.475	1	15.925
2009	European Championships	Milan					
2009	European Championships	Milan	Uneven Bars	1	15.575	1	15.275
2009	European Championships	Milan	Floor Exercise	1	15.150	1	14.975
2009	World Cup	Glasgow					
2009	World Cup	Glasgow	Uneven Bars	1	15.275	1	14.850
2009	World Cup	Glasgow	Floor Exercise	1	14.900	1	15.025
2009	World Championships	London					
2009	World Championships	London	Uneven Bars			16	13.850
2009	World Championships	London	Floor Exercise	1	14.650	4	14.075
2010	World Championships	Rotterdam	Uneven Bars	1	15.733	3	15.600
2010	World Championships	Rotterdam	Team	7	166.828	5	224.921
2010	World Championships	Rotterdam	Floor			17	14.000
2011	World Championships	Tokyo	Uneven Bars			13	14.433
2011	World Championships	Tokyo	Team	5	169.670	8	220.553
2011	World Championships	Tokyo	Floor	7	14.500	7	14.433
2012	World Cup	Doha	Uneven Bars	1	15.175	1	15.800
2012	Olympic Games	London	Uneven Bars	3	15.916	1	16.133

== Eponymous skill ==
Tweddle has one eponymous skill listed in the Code of Points.

Apparatus	Name	Description	Difficulty (Note: Valid for the 2025–2028 Code of Points)
Uneven bars	Tweddle	Pike sole circle (toe-on), counter straddle reverse hecht with half turn over high bar to catch in mixed L-grip	D (0.4)

== Artistic recognition ==
In 2012 Tweddle was one of five Olympians chosen as part of a series of body-casting artworks by Louise Giblin exhibited in London and copies being sold in aid of the charity Headfirst.

== See also ==
- List of Olympic female gymnasts for Great Britain
- List of female artistic gymnasts with the most appearances at Olympic Games
