= European Artistic Gymnastics Championships – Women's team all-around =

The team event at the European Women's Artistic Gymnastics Championships was first held in 1994.

Three medals are awarded: gold for first place, silver for second place, and bronze for third place. Tie breakers have not been used in every year. In the event of a tie between two teams, both teams are listed, and the following position (second for a tie for first, third for a tie for second) is left empty because a medal was not awarded for that position. If three teams tied for a position, the following two positions are left empty.

The teams with the most gold medals and total medals in this event are Romania and Russia. Romania has won seven golds, two silvers, and two bronzes. Russia has won five golds, five silvers, and three bronzes.

== Medalists ==
Year	Location	Gold	Silver	Bronze
1994	(Sweden) Stockholm	Romania; Simona Amânar; Gina Gogean; Lavinia Miloșovici; Nadia Hațegan	Russia; Dina Kochetkova; Svetlana Khorkina; Oksana Fabrichnova	Ukraine; Irina Bulakhova; Lilia Podkopayeva; Natalia Kalinina
1996	(United Kingdom) Birmingham	Romania; Lavinia Miloșovici; Gina Gogean; Simona Amânar; Ana Maria Bican; Andreea Cacovean	Russia; Dina Kochetkova; Svetlana Khorkina; Rozalia Galiyeva; Oksana Lyapina	Ukraine; Liubov Sheremeta; Anna Mirgorodskaya; Lilia Podkopayeva
1998	(Russia) Saint Petersburg	Romania; Simona Amânar; Claudia Presăcan; Maria Olaru; Corina Ungureanu; Alexandra Dobrescu	Russia; Svetlana Khorkina; Yevgeniya Kuznetsova; Ludmila Ezhova; Elena Zamolodchikova; Elena Dolgopolova	Ukraine; Olha Teslenko; Viktoria Karpenko; Inha Shkarupa; Halina Tyryk; Natalia Sirenko
2000	(France) Paris	Russia; Svetlana Khorkina; Elena Zamolodchikova; Yelena Produnova; Yekaterina Lobaznyuk; Yevgeniya Kuznetsova	Ukraine; Viktoria Karpenko; Olha Rozshchupkina; Tetiana Yarosh; Natalia Horodniy; Alona Kvasha	Romania; Andreea Răducan; Simona Amânar; Andreea Isărescu; Loredana Boboc
2002	(Greece) Patras	Russia; Svetlana Khorkina; Natalia Ziganshina; Ludmila Ezhova; Elena Zamolodchikova; Ekaterina Shuster	Netherlands; Verona van de Leur; Suzanne Harmes; Gabriëlla Wammes; Renske Endel; Monique Nuijten	Italy; Maria Teresa Gargano; Ilaria Colombo; Monica Bergamelli
2004	(Netherlands) Amsterdam	Romania; Nicoleta Daniela Șofronie; Cătălina Ponor; Monica Roșu; Alexandra Eremia; Silvia Stroescu	Ukraine; Alina Kozich; Irina Yarotska; Iryna Krasnianska; Olga Sherbatykh; Alona Kvasha	Russia; Svetlana Khorkina; Elena Zamolodchikova; Anna Pavlova; Polina Miller; Leysira Gabdrakmanova
2006	(Greece) Volos	Italy; Vanessa Ferrari; Lia Parolari; Monica Bergamelli; Federica Macrì; Carlotta Giovannini	Romania; Sandra Izbașa; Cătălina Ponor; Alina Stănculescu; Florica Leonida; Steliana Nistor	Russia; Yulia Lozhechko; Irina Isayeva; Polina Miller; Anna Grudko; Nadezhda Ivanova
2008	(France) Clermont-Ferrand	Romania; Steliana Nistor; Sandra Izbașa; Anamaria Tămârjan; Gabriela Drăgoi; Cerasela Pătrașcu	Russia; Ksenia Semenova; Anna Pavlova; Svetlana Klyukina; Karina Myasnikova; Ksenia Afanasyeva	France; Pauline Morel; Marine Petit; Laetitia Dugain; Cassy Vericel; Isabelle Severino
2010	(United Kingdom) Birmingham	Russia; Aliya Mustafina; Anna Myzdrikova; Ksenia Semyonova; Tatiana Nabieva; Ekaterina Kurbatova	Great Britain; Becky Downie; Nicole Hibbert; Beth Tweddle; Niamh Rippin; Jocelyn Hunt	Romania; Amelia Racea; Raluca Haidu; Ana Porgras; Diana Chelaru
2012	(Belgium) Brussels	Romania; Larisa Iordache; Cătălina Ponor; Diana Bulimar; Sandra Izbașa; Raluca Haidu	Russia; Anastasia Grishina; Aliya Mustafina; Viktoria Komova; Anastasia Sidorova; Maria Paseka	Italy; Erika Fasana; Vanessa Ferrari; Carlotta Ferlito; Francesca Deagostini; Giorgia Campana
2014	(Bulgaria) Sofia	Romania; Larisa Iordache; Diana Bulimar; Andreea Munteanu; Ștefania Stănilă; Silvia Zarzu	Great Britain; Becky Downie; Ruby Harrold; Claudia Fragapane; Rebecca Tunney; Hannah Whelan	Russia; Aliya Mustafina; Maria Kharenkova; Daria Spiridonova; Alla Sosnitskaya; Anna Rodionova
2016	(Switzerland) Bern	Russia; Angelina Melnikova; Aliya Mustafina; Seda Tutkhalyan; Daria Spiridonova; Ksenia Afanasyeva	Great Britain; Claudia Fragapane; Ruby Harrold; Ellie Downie; Gabrielle Jupp; Becky Downie	France; Oréane Léchenault; Marine Boyer; Marine Brevet; Loan His; Alison Lepin
2018	(Scotland) Glasgow	Russia; Angelina Melnikova; Angelina Simakova; Lilia Akhaimova; Irina Alexeeva; Uliana Perebinosova	France; Mélanie de Jesus dos Santos; Marine Boyer; Lorette Charpy; Coline Devillard; Juliette Bossu	Netherlands; Vera van Pol; Céline van Gerner; Tisha Volleman; Sanne Wevers; Naomi Visser
2020	(Turkey) Mersin	Ukraine; Anastasiia Bachynska; Yelyzaveta Hubareva; Anastasiia Motak; Angelina Radivilova; Diana Varinska	Romania; Antonia Duță; Larisa Iordache; Silviana Sfiringu; Ioana Stănciulescu; Daniela Trică	Hungary; Csenge Bácskay; Dorina Böczögő; Zsófia Kovács; Mirtill Makovits; Zója Székely
2022	(Germany) Munich	Italy; Angela Andreoli; Alice D'Amato; Asia D'Amato; Martina Maggio; Giorgia Villa	Great Britain; Ondine Achampong; Georgia-Mae Fenton; Jennifer Gadirova; Jessica Gadirova; Alice Kinsella	Germany; Kim Bui; Emma Malewski; Pauline Schäfer; Elisabeth Seitz; Sarah Voss
2023	(Turkey) Antalya	Great Britain; Ondine Achampong; Becky Downie; Georgia-Mae Fenton; Jessica Gadirova; Alice Kinsella	Italy; Angela Andreoli; Alice D'Amato; Asia D'Amato; Manila Esposito; Giorgia Villa	Netherlands; Eythora Thorsdottir; Vera van Pol; Sanna Veerman; Naomi Visser; Sanne Wevers
2024	(Italy) Rimini	Italy; Angela Andreoli; Alice D'Amato; Asia D'Amato; Manila Esposito; Elisa Iorio	Great Britain; Becky Downie; Ruby Evans; Georgia-Mae Fenton; Alice Kinsella; Abigail Martin	France; Marine Boyer; Lorette Charpy; Coline Devillard; Morgane Osyssek; Ming van Eijken
2025	(Germany) Leipzig	Italy; Alice D'Amato; Manila Esposito; Emma Fioravanti; Giulia Perotti; Sofia Tonelli	Germany; Helen Kevric; Janoah Mueller; Lea Marie Quaas; Karina Schoenmaier; Silja Stoehr	France; Lorette Charpy; Romane Hamelin; Djenna Laroui; Morgane Osyssek-Reimer; Ming van Eijken
2026	(Croatia) Zagreb	Russia; Alyona Glotova; Anna Kalmykova; Angelina Melnikova; Liudmila Roshchina; Elizaveta Us	Italy; Manila Esposito; Elisa Iorio; July Marano; Giulia Perotti; Anthea Sisio	France; Lorette Charpy; Lola Chassat; Elena Colas; Morgane Osyssek; Maïana Prat

== Medal table ==
Rank	Nation	Gold	Silver	Bronze	Total
1	Romania (ROU)	7	2	2	11
2	Russia (RUS)	6	5	3	14
3	Italy (ITA)	4	2	2	8
4	Great Britain (GBR)	1	5	0	6
5	Ukraine (UKR)	1	2	3	6
6	France (FRA)	0	1	5	6
7	Netherlands (NED)	0	1	2	3
8	Germany (GER)	0	1	1	2
9	Hungary (HUN)	0	0	1	1
Totals (9 entries)		19	19	19	57

Notes

- At the 2026 European Championships, the Croatian government banned the use of Russian flags and emblems despite World Gymnastics lifting the ban on Russian athletes; therefore the Russian team competed under the banner World Gymnastics 2. Their results here are attributed to Russia.
