= Gymnastics at the 2008 Summer Olympics – Women's artistic qualification =

Qualifications for Women's artistic gymnastic competitions at the 2008 Summer Olympics was held at the Beijing National Indoor Stadium on August 10. The results of the qualification determined the qualifiers to the finals: eight teams in the team final, 24 gymnasts in the all-around final, and eight gymnasts in each of four apparatus finals.

The competition was divided into four sessions, at 10:00am, 1:30pm, 5:00pm and 8:00pm.

== Qualification results ==
Gymnast	Vault (gymnastics)		Uneven bars		Balance beam		Floor (gymnastics)		Total (All-around)	
Gymnast	Score	Rank	Score	Rank	Score	Rank	Score	Rank	Score	Rank
China	61.825	2	62.650	1	63.050	2	60.750	1	248.275	1
Yang Yilin (CHN)	15.200	12	16.650	1	15.500	11	15.000	10	62.350	3
Jiang Yuyuan (CHN)	14.775	38	15.550	9	15.250	15	15.050	8	60.625	7
Deng Linlin (CHN)	15.225	10	14.725	29	15.550	9	14.950	12	60.450	9
Cheng Fei (CHN)	16.150	1			15.875	5	15.750	1	47.775	62
He Kexin (CHN)	15.250	9	15.725	6					30.975	79
Li Shanshan (CHN)					16.125	1	14.200	40	30.325	82
United States	62.225	1	61.125	3	63.400	1	60.050	2	246.800	2
Shawn Johnson (USA)	16.000	2	15.325	11	15.975	3	15.425	3	62.725	1
Nastia Liukin (USA)	15.100	16	15.950	5	15.975	2	15.350	4	62.375	2
Bridget Sloan (USA)	15.275	7	14.800	25	15.500	10	14.850	14	60.425	11
Alicia Sacramone (USA)	15.850	3			15.950	4	14.425	31	46.225	63
Chellsie Memmel (USA)			15.050	16					15.050	94
Samantha Peszek (USA)			14.800	23					14.800	96
Russia	60.850	3	61.775	2	62.000	3	59.775	3	244.400	3
Ksenia Semenova (RUS)	14.750	40	16.475	2	15.775	8	14.475	29	61.475	4
Anna Pavlova (RUS)	15.350	6	14.600	35	15.825	6	15.125	7	60.900	5
Ksenia Afanasyeva (RUS)	15.175	13	14.825	21	15.775	7	15.025	9	60.800	6
Ekaterina Kramarenko (RUS)	15.150	15	15.500	10	14.625	36	15.150	6	60.425	10
Svetlana Klyukina (RUS)	15.175	14	14.975	18			13.950	53	44.150	65
Ludmila Grebenkova (RUS)					14.600	37			14.600	97
Romania	59.725	4	58.450	9	60.950	4	59.300	4	238.425	4
Steliana Nistor (ROU)	14.900	27	15.975	4	15.075	22	14.550	24	60.500	8
Sandra Izbaşa (ROU)	15.100	20	13.575	65	15.225	16	15.475	2	59.375	13
Anamaria Tămârjan (ROU)	15.025	23	14.275	51	15.200	17	14.500	27	59.000	16
Gabriela Drăgoi (ROU)			14.225	53	15.450	12	14.250	38	43.925	66
Andreea Acatrinei (ROU)	14.350	53			14.175	52	14.775	16	43.300	71
Andreea Grigore (ROU)	14.700	43	13.975	59					28.675	88
Australia	59.450	5	59.050	6	58.625	8	58.325	6	235.450	5
Shona Morgan (AUS)	14.700	45	14.500	39	15.350	14	14.525	25	59.075	15
Georgia Bonora (AUS)	14.850	29	14.500	38	15.025	24	14.525	26	58.900	18
Ashleigh Brennan (AUS)	14.775	37	13.700	62	14.150	54	14.625	19	57.250	30
Daria Joura (AUS)	15.100	18	15.125	13	12.475	80	13.450	70	56.150	44
Lauren Mitchell (AUS)	14.725	42			14.100	57	14.650	17	43.475	68
Olivia Vivian (AUS)			14.925	20					14.925	95
France	58.825	10	58.525	8	58.975	7	57.550	8	233.875	6
Marine Petit (FRA)	14.850	31	14.325	48	14.800	29	14.375	32	58.350	20
Laetitia Dugain (FRA)	14.350	52	14.625	34	14.975	26	14.325	33	58.275	22
Pauline Morel (FRA)	14.275	55	14.800	24	13.750	69	14.625	20	57.450	29
Katheleen Lindor (FRA)	14.900	26	14.700	30	14.575	40			44.175	64
Rose-Eliandre Bellemare (FRA)	14.725	41	14.400	43			14.225	39	43.350	70
Marine Debauve (FRA)					14.625	35	14.100	49	28.725	87
Brazil	59.450	5	58.425	10	56.675	11	59.250	5	233.800	7
Jade Barbosa (BRA)	15.100	17	14.800	22	14.700	32	14.900	13	59.500	12
Ana Cláudia Silva (BRA)	14.750	39	14.550	36	13.475	73	14.800	15	57.575	28
Ethiene Franco (BRA)	14.175	61	14.100	55	14.400	42	14.275	35	56.950	36
Laís Souza (BRA)	14.800	36	14.775	26	13.575	71			43.150	73
Daniele Hypólito (BRA)			14.300	50	14.000	61	14.250	37	42.550	75
Daiane dos Santos (BRA)	14.800	35					15.275	5	30.075	83
Japan	58.050	11	58.725	7	59.900	5	56.500	11	233.175	8
Koko Tsurumi (JPN)	14.200	58	15.025	17	15.425	13	14.325	34	58.975	17
Kyoko Oshima (JPN)	14.700	43	14.450	42	14.300	47	14.175	42	57.625	27
Miki Uemura (JPN)	14.475	50	12.775	76	14.575	38	12.875	76	54.700	50
Yuko Shintake (JPN)	14.675	48			15.050	23	14.175	41	43.900	67
Yu Minobe (JPN)	14.050	68	14.525	37			13.825	59	42.400	76
Mayu Kuroda (JPN)			14.725	28	14.850	28			29.575	84
Great Britain	59.325	7	57.875	11	57.450	10	57.775	7	232.425	9
Becky Downie (GBR)	15.050	22	14.650	33	14.225	50	14.150	43	58.075	24
Imogen Cairns (GBR)	14.850	30	13.475	68	14.175	51	14.550	23	57.050	33
Marissa King (GBR)	14.875	28	13.475	69	14.325	46	13.750	62	56.425	42
Rebecca Wing (GBR)	14.550	49	14.100	56	14.575	39			43.225	72
Hannah Whelan (GBR)	13.500	79			14.325	45	14.125	46	41.950	77
Beth Tweddle (GBR)			15.650	8			14.950	11	30.600	80
Italy	59.075	9	57.375	12	58.200	9	56.625	10	231.275	10
Vanessa Ferrari (ITA)	14.825	34	14.050	58	14.775	31	14.650	18	58.300	21
Lia Parolari (ITA)	14.075	67	14.375	45	15.175	18	14.575	22	58.200	23
Carlotta Giovannini (ITA)	15.100	19	14.475	41	13.900	65	13.575	68	57.050	34
Francesca Benolli (ITA)	15.075	21	14.475	40	13.850	66	13.600	66	57.000	35
Monica Bergamelli (ITA)	13.900	71			14.350	44			28.250	89
Federica Macrì (ITA)			13.550	66			13.800	60	27.350	91
Ukraine	58.000	12	60.625	4	59.700	6	52.800	12	231.125	11
Valentyna Holenkova (UKR)	13.975	70	14.375	46	14.275	48	14.125	44	56.750	37
Alina Kozich (UKR)	14.975	24	13.625	45	15.175	19	12.000	81	55.775	45
Iryna Krasnianska (UKR)	14.200	59	14.250	52	15.025	25			43.475	69
Maryna Proskurina (UKR)	14.850	31			14.625	34	13.675	65	43.150	74
Dariya Zgoba (UKR)			15.675	7	14.875	27			30.550	81
Anastasiia Koval (UKR)			16.325	3			13.000	74	29.325	85
Germany	59.150	8	59.150	5	55.825	12	56.675	9	230.800	12
Oksana Chusovitina (GER)	15.800	4	14.725	27	14.400	43	14.450	30	59.375	14
Katja Abel (GER)	14.250	56	14.650	32	14.075	58	13.475	69	56.450	40
Daria Bijak (GER)	14.175	62	14.650	31	11.150	83	14.475	28	54.450	51
Marie-Sophie Hindermann (GER)	14.925	25	13.125	74	13.425	74	12.400	79	53.875	55
Joeline Möbius (GER)	13.675	76			13.925	64	14.275	36	41.875	78
Anja Brinker (GER)			15.125	14					15.125	93
Elyse Hopfner-Hibbs (CAN)	14.675	47	14.975	19	15.125	20	13.875	56	58.650	19
Ariella Käslin (SUI)	15.225	11	14.300	49	14.650	33	13.875	55	58.050	25
Kristýna Pálešová (CZE)	14.325	54	15.100	15	15.075	21	13.300	73	57.800	26
Gaelle Mys (BEL)	14.050	69	14.175	54	14.800	30	14.125	47	57.150	31
Suzanne Harmes (NED)	14.825	33	13.825	60	13.825	67	14.600	21	57.075	32
Nansy Damianova (CAN)	14.700	46	13.650	63	14.250	49	14.100	48	56.700	38
Stefani Bismpikou (GRE)	14.225	57	14.350	47	14.475	41	13.575	67	56.625	39
Hong Un Jong (PRK)	15.650	5	14.100	57	12.825	78	13.850	58	56.425	41
Jessica López (VEN)	14.375	51	13.800	61	14.050	60	13.950	52	56.175	43
Marta Pihan (POL)	13.625	78	14.375	44	13.525	72	14.125	45	55.650	46
Lenika de Simone (ESP)	14.100	66	13.550	67	14.100	56	13.850	57	55.600	47
Nastassia Marachkouskaya (BLR)	15.275	8	12.200	80	13.600	70	14.025	51	55.100	48
Laura Campos (ESP)	14.200	60	13.075	75	13.975	62	13.775	61	55.025	49
Dorina Böczögő (HUN)	13.375	80	13.200	72	13.950	63	13.925	54	54.450	52
Nathalia Sánchez (COL)	14.150	64	13.175	73	13.825	68	13.000	75	54.150	53
Jelena Zanevskaja (LTU)	13.875	72	13.350	70	13.375	76	13.350	72	53.950	54
Marisela Cantú (MEX)	14.175	63	12.625	78	12.700	79	14.025	50	53.525	56
Tina Erceg (CRO)	13.650	67	11.825	82	14.075	59	13.700	64	53.250	57
Jo Hyun-Joo (KOR)	14.125	65	11.875	81	13.400	75	13.375	71	52.775	58
Luiza Galiulina (UZB)	12.225	81	13.300	71	14.175	53	12.375	80	52.075	59
Nikolina Tankoucheva (BUL)	13.850	73	12.700	77	12.075	82	12.850	77	51.475	60
Sherine Ahmed el Zeiny (EGY)	13.750	74	10.600	83	13.000	77	12.650	78	50.000	61
Cha Yong Hwa (PRK)	13.750	75	15.175	12					28.925	86
Adela Šajn (SLO)					14.100	55	13.700	63	27.800	90
Ivana Kováčová (SVK)			12.500	79	12.350	81			24.850	92

== Finalists ==
=== Teams qualified ===
Position	Gymnast	Vault (gymnastics)	Uneven bars	Balance beam	Floor (gymnastics)	Total
1	China	61.825	62.650	63.050	60.750	248.275
2	United States	62.225	61.125	63.400	60.050	246.800
3	Russia	60.850	61.775	62.000	59.775	244.400
4	Romania	59.725	58.450	60.950	59.300	238.425
5	Australia	59.450	59.050	58.625	58.325	235.450
6	France	58.825	58.525	58.975	57.550	233.875
7	Brazil	59.450	58.425	56.675	59.250	233.800
8	Japan	58.050	58.725	59.900	56.500	233.175

=== All-around qualifiers ===
Position	Gymnast	Vault (gymnastics)	Uneven bars	Balance beam	Floor (gymnastics)	Total
1	Shawn Johnson (USA)	16.000	15.325	15.975	15.425	62.725
2	Nastia Liukin (USA)	15.100	15.950	15.975	15.350	62.375
3	Yang Yilin (CHN)	15.200	16.650	15.500	15.000	62.350
4	Ksenia Semenova (RUS)	14.750	16.475	15.775	14.475	61.475
5	Anna Pavlova (RUS)	15.350	14.600	15.825	15.125	60.900
6	Jiang Yuyuan (CHN)	14.825	15.550	15.250	15.050	60.675
7	Steliana Nistor (ROU)	14.900	15.975	15.075	14.550	60.500
8	Jade Barbosa (BRA)	15.100	14.800	14.700	14.900	59.500
9	Sandra Izbaşa (ROU)	15.100	13.575	15.225	15.475	59.375
10	Oksana Chusovitina (GER)	15.800	14.725	14.400	14.450	59.375
11	Shona Morgan (AUS)	14.700	14.500	15.350	14.525	59.075
12	Koko Tsurumi (JPN)	14.200	15.025	15.425	14.325	58.975
13	Georgia Bonora (AUS)	14.850	14.500	15.025	14.525	58.900
14	Elyse Hopfner-Hibbs (CAN)	14.675	14.975	15.125	13.875	58.650
15	Marine Petit (FRA)	14.850	14.325	14.800	14.375	58.350
16	Vanessa Ferrari (ITA)	14.825	14.050	14.775	14.650	58.300
17	Laetitia Dugain (FRA)	14.350	14.625	14.975	14.325	58.275
18	Lia Parolari (ITA)	14.075	14.375	15.175	14.575	58.200
19	Becky Downie (GBR)	15.050	14.650	14.225	14.150	58.075
20	Ariella Kaslin (SUI)	15.225	14.300	14.650	13.875	58.050
21	Kristýna Pálešová (CZE)	14.325	15.100	15.075	13.300	57.800
22	Kyoko Oshima (JPN)	14.700	14.450	14.300	14.175	57.625
23	Ana Silva (BRA)	14.750	14.550	13.475	14.800	57.575
24	Gaelle Mys (BEL)	14.050	14.175	14.800	14.125	57.150

Only two gymnasts per country may advance to a final. The following gymnasts scored high enough to qualify, but did not do so because two gymnasts from their country had already qualified ahead of them:

- Ksenia Afanasyeva (RUS) 60.800 (6th place)
- Deng Linlin (CHN) 60.450 (9th place)
- Ekaterina Kramarenko (RUS) 60.425 (10th place)
- Bridget Sloan (USA) 60.425 (11th place)
- Anamaria Tămârjan (ROU) 59.000 (16th place)
- Pauline Morel (FRA) 57.450 (29th place)
- Ashleigh Brennan (AUS) 57.250 (30th place)

The eventual final qualifier placed 31st overall in the all-around.

=== Vault event final (EF) qualifiers ===
Position	Gymnast	Vault 1				Vault 2				Total
Position	Gymnast	A Score	B Score	Penalty	Vault Score	A Score	B Score	Penalty	Vault Score	Total
1	Cheng Fei (CHN)	6.500	9.650		16.150	6.500	9.175		15.675	15.912
2	Hong Un Jong (PRK)	6.500	9.150		15.650	6.500	9.300		15.800	15.725
3	Alicia Sacramone (USA)	6.300	9.550		15.850	5.800	9.600		15.400	15.625
4	Oksana Chusovitina (GER)	6.300	9.500		15.800	5.700	9.550		15.250	15.525
5	Anna Pavlova (RUS)	5.800	9.550		15.350	5.600	9.600		15.200	15.275
6	Carlotta Giovannini (ITA)	5.800	9.300		15.100	5.900	9.275		15.175	15.137
7	Jade Barbosa (BRA)	5.800	9.400	0.100	15.100	5.600	9.400		15.000	15.050
8	Ariella Kaslin (SUI)	6.300	8.925		15.225	5.500	9.225		14.725	14.975

=== Uneven bars EF qualifiers ===
Position	Gymnast	A Score	B Score	Penalty	Total
1	Yang Yilin (CHN)	7.700	8.950		16.650
2	Ksenia Semenova (RUS)	7.400	9.075		16.475
3	Anastasia Koval (UKR)	7.300	9.025		16.325
4	Steliana Nistor (ROU)	7.300	8.675		15.975
5	Nastia Liukin (USA)	7.700	8.250		15.950
6	He Kexin (CHN)	7.500	8.225		15.725
7	Dariya Zgoba (UKR)	6.900	8.875	0.100	15.675
8	Beth Tweddle (GBR)	7.600	8.050		15.650

=== Balance beam EF qualifiers ===
Position	Gymnast	A Score	B Score	Penalty	Total
1	Li Shanshan (CHN)	7.000	9.125		16.125
2	Nastia Liukin (USA)	6.600	9.375		15.975
3	Shawn Johnson (USA)	6.900	9.075		15.975
4	Cheng Fei (CHN)	6.700	9.275	0.100	15.875
5	Anna Pavlova (RUS)	6.700	9.125		15.825
6	Ksenia Afanasyeva (RUS)	6.600	9.175		15.775
7	Gabriela Drăgoi (ROU)	6.500	8.950		15.450
8	Koko Tsurumi (JPN)	6.500	8.925		15.425

Only two gymnasts per country may advance to an event final. The following gymnasts scored high enough to qualify, but did not do so because two gymnasts from their country had already qualified ahead of them:

- Alicia Sacramone (USA) 15.950 (4th place)
- Ksenia Semenova (RUS) 15.775 (8th place)
- Deng Linlin (CHN) 15.550 (9th place)
- Bridget Sloan (USA) 15.500 (10th place)
- Yang Yilin (CHN) 15.500 (11th place)

The eventual final two qualifiers, Dragoi (ROU) and Tsurumi (JPN), had the 12th and 13th highest balance beam score overall during qualification.

=== Floor EF qualifiers ===
Position	Gymnast	A Score	B Score	Penalty	Total
1	Cheng Fei (CHN)	6.600	9.150		15.750
2	Sandra Izbaşa (ROU)	6.500	8.975		15.475
3	Shawn Johnson (USA)	6.300	9.125		15.425
4	Nastia Liukin (USA)	6.200	9.150		15.350
5	Daiane dos Santos (BRA)	6.400	8.975	0.100	15.275
6	Ekaterina Kramarenko (RUS)	6.100	9.050		15.150
7	Anna Pavlova (RUS)	5.900	9.225		15.125
8	Jiang Yuyuan (CHN)	6.200	8.850		15.050
