= Gymnastics at the 2005 European Youth Summer Olympic Festival =

- Venue: Latisana Indoor Stadium
- Location: (Italy) Lignano Sabbiadoro
- Dates: 3–8 July 2005

Gymnastics at the 2005 European Youth Summer Olympic Festival (EYOF) was held from 3 to 8 July 2005. The competitions took place at the Latisana Indoor Stadium in Latisana, Italy.

== Medal summary ==
=== Medal table ===
==== Overall ====
Rank	Nation	Gold	Silver	Bronze	Total
1	Russia	3	1	4	8
2	Italy	2	1	2	5
3	Romania	1	3	0	4
4	Czech Republic	0	1	0	1
Totals (4 entries)		6	6	6	18

=== Medal events ===
==== Girls ====
Event	Gold	Silver	Bronze
Team all-around	Russia; Karina Myasnikova; Ksenia Afanasyeva; Alena Donodina	Romania; Sandra Izbaşa; Andrea Stanescu; Alina Stanculescu	Italy; Vanessa Ferrari; Federica Macri; Lia Parolari
Individual all-around	Vanessa Ferrari; Italy	Karina Myasnikova; Russia	Ksenia Afanasyeva; Russia
Vault	Sandra Izbaşa; Romania	Vanessa Ferrari; Italy	Karina Myasnikova; Russia
Uneven bars	Karina Myasnikova; Russia	Kristyna Palesova; Czech Republic	Vanessa Ferrari; Italy
Balance beam	Karina Myasnikova; Russia	Alina Stanculescu; Romania	Ksenia Afanasyeva; Russia
Floor exercise	Vanessa Ferrari; Italy	Sandra Izbaşa; Romania	Ksenia Afanasyeva; Russia

== See also ==
- European Youth Olympic Festival
