= Anna Grudko =

Russian artistic gymnast

- Born: February 9, 1990 (age 36) Severodvinsk, Russian SSR, Soviet Union

Gymnastics career
- Discipline: Women's artistic gymnastics
- Country represented: Russia
Medal record
Women's artistic gymnastics
Representing Russia
World Championships
Bronze medal – third place	2006 Aarhus	Team
European Championships
Gold medal – first place	2006 Volos	Vault
Bronze medal – third place	2006 Volos	Team
Bronze medal – third place	2007 Amsterdam	Vault

Anna Grudko (Russian: Анна Грудко; born 9 February 1990) is a Russian former artistic gymnast. She is the 2006 European champion on vault, and a member of the Russian team at the 2006 World Championships that won the bronze medal. Additionally, she won bronze at the 2006 European Championships with the Russian team and at the 2007 European Championships on vault.

== Gymnastics career ==
Grudko competed at the 2004 Friendship Classic in Pottsville, Pennsylvania, and won the junior all-around silver medal behind teammate Svetlana Klyukina. She finished fourth in the all-around at the 2004 WOGA Classic. At the 2005 WOGA Classic, she finished sixth in the all-around.

Grudko became age-eligible for senior international competitions in 2006. She competed at the 2006 European Championships alongside Yulia Lozhechko, Irina Isayeva, Polina Miller, and Nadezhda Ivanova, and they won the team bronze medal behind Italy and Romania. Grudko qualified for the vault final and won the gold medal by 0.062 points ahead of Ukraine's Olga Sherbatykh. She was selected to compete at the 2006 World Championships alongside Miller, Svetlana Klyukina, Anna Pavlova, Kristina Pravdina, and Elena Zamolodchikova, and they won the team bronze medal behind China and the United States.

Grudko competed at the 2007 European Championships and won the bronze medal in the vault final behind Carlotta Giovannini and Oksana Chusovitina. She then won the vault title at the 2007 Ghent World Cup. At the 2007 World Stars in Moscow, she finished fourth in the vault final and sixth in the floor exercise final.
