= 2006 European Women's Artistic Gymnastics Championships =

26th European Women's Artistic Gymnastics Championships
- Location: Volos, Greece
- Dates: 27 to 30 April 2006
- Nations: Members of the European Union of Gymnastics

The 26th European Women's Artistic Gymnastics Championships were held from 27 April to 30 April 2006 in Volos, Greece.

Led by new senior Vanessa Ferrari, Italy became the first team besides Romania, Russia, and the Soviet Union to win the senior team title. Ferrari went on to win the All-Around gold medal for Italy at that year's world championships. Katja Abel's bronze medal on vault was the first medal for unified Germany at the European Championships.

== Timetable ==
Date	Time	Event
27 Apr	10.30 – 21.00	Seniors Qualification
29 Apr	16.00 – 18.00	Seniors Team Final
30 Apr	15.00 – 17.20	Seniors Event Final

== Medalists ==
Event	Gold	Silver	Bronze
Seniors
Team	Italy; Vanessa Ferrari; Lia Parolari; Monica Bergamelli; Federica Macrì; Carlotta Giovannini	Romania; Sandra Izbașa; Cătălina Ponor; Alina Stănculescu; Florica Leonida; Steliana Nistor	Russia; Yulia Lozhechko; Irina Isayeva; Polina Miller; Anna Grudko; Nadezhda Ivanova
Vault	(Russia) Anna Grudko	(Ukraine) Olga Sherbatykh	(Germany) Katja Abel
Uneven bars	(United Kingdom) Beth Tweddle	(Czech Republic) Jana Šikulová	(Spain) Lenika de Simone
Balance beam	(Romania) Cătălina Ponor	(Spain) Lenika de Simone	(Ukraine) Marina Proskurina (Romania) Sandra Izbașa
Floor	(Romania) Sandra Izbașa	(Italy) Vanessa Ferrari	(Romania) Cătălina Ponor
Juniors
Team	Russia; Darya Elizarova; Karina Myasnikova; Elena Kokareva; Ksenia Afanasyeva; Nadezhda Chikhireva	Romania; Aluissa Lăcusteanu; Andreea Grigore; Cerasela Pătrașcu; Alexandra Ghiță; Mădălina Guțu	Germany; Marie-Sophie Hindermann; Anja Brinker; Joeline Möbius; Dorothee Henzler; Lisa Katharina Hill
Individual all-around	(Russia) Darya Elizarova	(Russia) Karina Myasnikova	(Germany) Marie-Sophie Hindermann
Vault	(Russia) Karina Myasnikova	(Germany) Marie-Sophie Hindermann	(Luxembourg) Mandy Loes
Uneven bars	(Russia) Karina Myasnikova	(Russia) Elena Kokareva	(Germany) Marie-Sophie Hindermann
Balance beam	(Russia) Darya Elizarova	(Romania) Andreea Grigore	(Romania) Aluissa Lăcusteanu
Floor	(Romania) Aluissa Lăcusteanu	(Romania) Andreea Grigore	(Belgium) Gaelle Mys

== Seniors ==
=== Team ===
Rank	Team	Vault (gymnastics)	Uneven bars	Balance beam	Floor (gymnastics)	Total
1st place, gold medalist(s)	Italy	42.975 (2)	43.400 (3)	44.875 (2)	43.975 (2)	175.225
1st place, gold medalist(s)	Vanessa Ferrari	14.300	15.600	15.600	15.250	175.225
1st place, gold medalist(s)	Lia Parolari		14.000	14.300	14.475	175.225
1st place, gold medalist(s)	Monica Bergamelli		13.800	14.975		175.225
1st place, gold medalist(s)	Federica Macrì	14.500			14.250	175.225
1st place, gold medalist(s)	Carlotta Giovannini	14.175				175.225
2nd place, silver medalist(s)	Romania	42.700 (3)	42.825 (5)	45.125 (1)	44.475 (1)	175.125
2nd place, silver medalist(s)	Sandra Izbașa	14.825	14.275	15.100	15.500	175.125
2nd place, silver medalist(s)	Cătălina Ponor	14.325		15.175	14.600	175.125
2nd place, silver medalist(s)	Alina Stănculescu			14.850	14.375	175.125
2nd place, silver medalist(s)	Florica Leonida	13.550	13.525			175.125
2nd place, silver medalist(s)	Steliana Nistor		15.025			175.125
3rd place, bronze medalist(s)	Russia	43.525 (1)	44.025 (1)	42.100 (5)	43.725 (3)	173.375
3rd place, bronze medalist(s)	Yulia Lozhechko	14.550	15.200	14.475		173.375
3rd place, bronze medalist(s)	Irina Isayeva		13.900	14.200	14.950	173.375
3rd place, bronze medalist(s)	Polina Miller	14.400	14.925			173.375
3rd place, bronze medalist(s)	Anna Grudko	14.575			14.325	173.375
3rd place, bronze medalist(s)	Nadezhda Ivanova			13.425	14.450	173.375
4	Spain	41.600 (6)	43.800 (2)	44.000 (3)	42.000 (5)	171.400
4	Lenika de Simone	13.650	14.625	15.000	14.175	171.400
4	Thais Escolar	13.675		15.050	13.800	171.400
4	Tania Gener	14.275	14.725			171.400
4	Laura Campos		14.450	13.950		171.400
4	Patricia Moreno				14.025	171.400
5	Ukraine	42.650 (4)	42.850 (4)	42.950 (4)	42.400 (4)	170.850
5	Marina Proskurina	14.475	14.400	15.075		170.850
5	Alina Kozich	13.950		13.575	14.150	170.850
5	Dariya Zgoba		14.450	14.300		170.850
5	Maryna Kostiuchenko		14.00		14.275	170.850
5	Olga Sherbatykh	14.225			13.975	170.850
6	France	42.150 (5)	41.825 (6)	41.900 (6)	40.650 (7)	166.525
6	Rose-Eliandre Bellemare	14.300	14.575	14.100	13.675	166.525
6	Katheleen Lindor	14.025	13.600	14.025	13.825	166.525
6	Erika Morel			13.775	13.150	166.525
6	Lindsay Lindor	13.825				166.525
6	Julie Martinez		13.650			166.525
7	Great Britain	41.400 (7)	40.175 (7)	40.350 (7)	40.800 (6)	162.725
7	Melanie Roberts	13.650	13.950	14.275	13.400	162.725
7	Imogen Cairns	14.100	13.475	12.900	13.900	162.725
7	Amy Nunes	13.650	12.750	13.175	13.500	162.725
8	Netherlands	26.725 (8)	30.450 (8)	27.925 (8)	27.850 (8)	112.950
8	Loes Linders	13.275	12.850	14.200	13.850	112.950
8	Hanneke Hoefnagel		12.775	13.725		112.950
8	Suzanne Harmes				14.000	112.950
8	Verona van de Leur	13.450				112.950
8	Lichelle Wong		4.825			112.950

=== Vault ===
Rank	Gymnast	Score 1	Score 2	Total
1st place, gold medalist(s)	Anna Grudko (RUS)	14.925	13.800	14.362
2nd place, silver medalist(s)	Olga Sherbatykh (UKR)	14.275	14.325	14.300
3rd place, bronze medalist(s)	Katja Abel (GER)	14.500	13.950	14.225
4	Jana Komrsková (CZE)	14.175	14.125	14.150
5	Carlotta Giovannini (ITA)	13.900	14.350	14.125
6	Ariella Käslin (SUI)	14.050	13.950	14.000
7	Sandra Izbașa (ROU)	14.675	13.225	13.950
8	Imogen Cairns (GBR)	14.000	13.700	13.850

=== Uneven Bars ===
Rank	Gymnast	Total
1st place, gold medalist(s)	Beth Tweddle (GBR)	16.050
2nd place, silver medalist(s)	Jana Šikulová (CZE)	15.050
3rd place, bronze medalist(s)	Lenika de Simone (ESP)	14.825
4	Yulia Lozhechko (RUS)	14.625
5	Rose-Eliandre Bellemare (FRA)	14.575
6	Steliana Nistor (ROU)	14.525
7	Vanessa Ferrari (ITA)	14.300
8	Dariya Zgoba (UKR)	14.225

=== Balance Beam ===
Rank	Gymnast	Total
1st place, gold medalist(s)	Cătălina Ponor (ROU)	15.800
2nd place, silver medalist(s)	Lenika de Simone (ESP)	15.350
3rd place, bronze medalist(s)	Sandra Izbașa (ROU)	15.300
3rd place, bronze medalist(s)	Marina Proskurina (UKR)	15.300
5	Irina Isayeva (RUS)	15.050
6	Yulia Lozhechko (RUS)	14.925
7	Vanessa Ferrari (ITA)	14.875
8	Stefani Bismpikou (GRE)	14.800

=== Floor Exercise ===
Rank	Gymnast	Total
1st place, gold medalist(s)	Sandra Izbașa (ROU)	15.550
2nd place, silver medalist(s)	Vanessa Ferrari (ITA)	15.450
3rd place, bronze medalist(s)	Cătălina Ponor (ROU)	14.600
4	Irina Isayeva (RUS)	14.475
5	Maryna Kostiuchenko (UKR)	14.325
5	Rose-Eliandre Bellemare (FRA)	14.325
7	Thais Escolar (ESP)	14.300
8	Olga Sherbatykh (UKR)	13.900

== Juniors ==
=== Individual all-around ===
Rank	Gymnast	Vault (gymnastics)	Uneven bars	Balance beam	Floor (gymnastics)	Total
1st place, gold medalist(s)	Darya Elizarova (RUS)	13.700	15.150	15.525	14.875	59.250
2nd place, silver medalist(s)	Karina Myasnikova (RUS)	14.450	15.475	14.875	14.000	58.800
3rd place, bronze medalist(s)	Marie-Sophie Hindermann (GER)	14.375	14.725	14.650	14.050	57.800
4	Aluissa Lăcusteanu (ROU)	14.450	14.000	14.625	14.575	57.650
5	Andreea Grigore (ROU)	14.500	13.625	14.925	14.000	57.050
6	Gaelle Mys (BEL)	13.700	14.025	14.675	14.250	56.650
7	Tahnee Masela (NED)	13.825	14.825	13.400	13.850	55.900
8	Rebecca Downie (GBR)	13.850	14.225	13.725	13.975	55.775
9	Valentina Holenkova (UKR)	12.500	14.300	14.750	13.675	55.225
10	Dorina Böczögő (HUN)	13.425	14.525	13.600	13.475	55.025
11	Cassy Vericel (FRA)	13.675	13.100	13.950	13.900	54.625
12	Georgia Bonanni (ITA)	13.625	14.100	14.050	12.850	54.625
13	Silvia Zanolo (ITA)	13.425	13.950	13.250	13.975	54.600
14	Hannah Clowes (GBR)	13.575	13.375	14.125	13.325	54.400
15	Anne Tritten (NED)	13.200	13.800	13.775	13.425	54.200
16	Anja Brinker (GER)	13.300	14.925	12.850	13.050	54.125
17	Anastasia Koval (UKR)	12.950	14.400	13.800	12.900	54.050
18	Mercedes Alcaide (ESP)	13.175	13.650	13.575	13.625	54.025
19	Kristýna Pálešová (CZE)	13.625	13.250	12.975	13.700	53.550
20	Anna Orfanou (GRE)	12.925	13.725	13.800	13.050	53.500
21	Despoina Grigoriadou (GRE)	13.000	12.950	14.225	12.550	52.725
22	Stefanie Van Meerbeeck (BEL)	13.350	12.350	13.950	13.050	52.700
23	Eva Verbová (CZE)	13.100	13.625	12.725	13.075	52.525
24	Cloe Briand (FRA)	12.900	12.675	13.425	13.300	52.300

=== Vault ===
Rank	Gymnast	Score 1	Score 2	Total
1st place, gold medalist(s)	Karina Myasnikova (RUS)	14.425	13.925	14.175
2nd place, silver medalist(s)	Marie-Sophie Hindermann (GER)	14.550	13.225	13.887
3rd place, bronze medalist(s)	Mandy Loes (LUX)	13.925	13.550	13.737
4	Maria Parsantanian (GRE)	13.550	13.775	13.662
5	Cerasela Pătrașcu (ROU)	13.650	13.225	13.437
6	Cassy Véricel (FRA)	13.475	13.225	13.350
7	Gaelle Mys (BEL)	13.825	12.650	13.237
8	Darya Elizarova (RUS)	12.725	13.475	13.100

=== Uneven Bars ===
Rank	Gymnast	Total
1st place, gold medalist(s)	Karina Myasnikova (RUS)	15.400
2nd place, silver medalist(s)	Elena Kokareva (RUS)	15.125
3rd place, bronze medalist(s)	Marie-Sophie Hindermann (GER)	14.925
4	Anastasia Koval (UKR)	14.900
5	Tahnee Masela (NED)	14.800
6	Valentina Holenkova (UKR)	14.725
7	Anja Brinker (GER)	14.600
8	Dorina Böczögő (HUN)	14.500

=== Balance Beam ===
Rank	Gymnast	Total
1st place, gold medalist(s)	Darya Elizarova (RUS)	15.375
2nd place, silver medalist(s)	Andreea Grigore (ROU)	15.200
3rd place, bronze medalist(s)	Aluissa Lăcusteanu (ROU)	14.725
4	Valentina Holenkova (UKR)	14.700
5	Laura Jones (GBR)	14.550
6	Gaelle Mys (BEL)	13.900
7	Karina Myasnikova (RUS)	13.875
8	Marie-Sophie Hindermann (GER)	13.850

=== Floor Exercise ===
Rank	Gymnast	Total
1st place, gold medalist(s)	Aluissa Lăcusteanu (ROU)	14.650
2nd place, silver medalist(s)	Andreea Grigore (ROU)	14.150
3rd place, bronze medalist(s)	Gaelle Mys (BEL)	14.125
4	Silvia Zanolo (ITA)	13.950
5	Nadezhda Chikhireva (RUS)	13.925
6	Rebecca Downie (GBR)	13.850
7	Darya Elizarova (RUS)	13.625
8	Marie-Sophie Hindermann (GER)	13.075

== Medal Count ==
=== Combined ===
Rank	Nation	Gold	Silver	Bronze	Total
1	Russia	6	2	1	9
2	Romania	3	4	3	10
3	Italy	1	1	0	2
4	Great Britain	1	0	0	1
5	Germany	0	1	4	5
6	Spain	0	1	1	2
6	Ukraine	0	1	1	2
8	Czech Republic	0	1	0	1
9	Belgium	0	0	1	1
9	Luxembourg	0	0	1	1
Totals (10 entries)		11	11	12	34

=== Seniors ===
Rank	Nation	Gold	Silver	Bronze	Total
1	Romania	2	1	2	5
2	Italy	1	1	0	2
3	Russia	1	0	1	2
4	Great Britain	1	0	0	1
5	Spain	0	1	1	2
5	Ukraine	0	1	1	2
7	Czech Republic	0	1	0	1
8	Germany	0	0	1	1
Totals (8 entries)		5	5	6	16

=== Juniors ===
Rank	Nation	Gold	Silver	Bronze	Total
1	Russia	5	2	0	7
2	Romania	1	3	1	5
3	Germany	0	1	3	4
4	Belgium	0	0	1	1
4	Luxembourg	0	0	1	1
Totals (5 entries)		6	6	6	18
