= Polina Miller =

Polina Miller may refer to:

- Polina Miller (gymnast) (born 1988), Russian artistic gymnast
- Polina Miller (sprinter) (born 2000), Russian track sprinter
