= Federica Macrì =

Italian gymnast (born 1990)

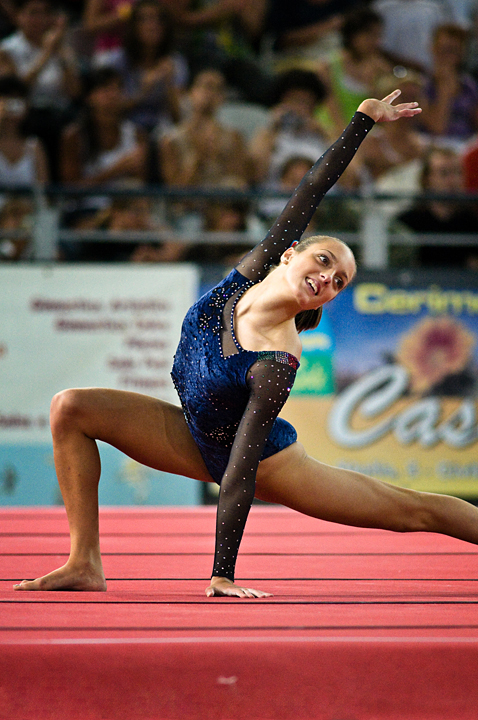
- Federica Macrì in 2008

Personal information
- Born: 22 August 1990 (age 36) Trieste, Italy
- Height: 157 cm (5 ft 2 in)

Gymnastics career
- Discipline: Women's artistic gymnastics
- Country represented: Italy (2004-2011, 2013 (ITA))
- Club: Artistica 81
- Head coaches: Diego Pecar, Teresa Macri
Medal record
Representing Italy
European Championships
| Gold medal – first place | 2006 Volos | Team |
Mediterranean Games
| Gold medal – first place | 2005 Almería | Team |
European Youth Olympic Festival
| Bronze medal – third place | 2005 Lignano Sabbiadoro | Team |

Federica Macrì (born 22 August 1990) is an Italian former artistic gymnast who competed at the 2008 Summer Olympics. She was a member of the Italian team that won the gold medal at the 2006 European Championships.

== Career ==
Macrì began gymnastics when she was three years old at the Artistica 81 club in her hometown Trieste. Her first major international competition was the 2004 Junior European Championships. The Italian team of Macrì, Vanessa Ferrari, Francesca Benolli, and Roberta Galante won the bronze medal behind Russia and Romania. Macrì also won the bronze medal on the floor exercise behind Romanian gymnasts Steliana Nistor and Sandra Izbașa.

Macrì was a part of the Italian team that won the gold medal at the 2005 Mediterranean Games. At the 2006 European Championships, the Italian team of Macrì, Vanessa Ferrari, Carlotta Giovannini, Monica Bergamelli, and Lia Parolari won the gold medal in the team competition. She also competed at the 2006 World Championships where the Italian team finished ninth in the qualification round. She finished fourteenth in the all-around at the 2007 European Championships. She also competed at the 2007 World Championships where the Italian team finished fourth, and Macrì finished nineteenth in the all-around final.

Macrì was selected to compete at the 2008 Olympic Games alongside Vanessa Ferrari, Carlotta Giovannini, Lia Parolari, Francesca Benolli, and Monica Bergamelli, and they finished tenth in the qualification round. She continued to compete after the Olympic Games. She competed at the 2010 City of Jesolo Trophy and helped the Italian team win the bronze medal. At the 2010 European Championships, the Italian team of Macrì, Vanessa Ferrari, Elisabetta Preziosa, and Paola Galante finished fifth. At the 2013 City of Jesolo Trophy, the Italian team won the silver medal, and Macrì finished thirteenth in the all-around.
