= Stănculescu =

Stănculescu is a Romanian surname. Notable people with the surname include:

- Alina Stănculescu (born 1990), Romanian artistic gymnast
- Ioana Stanciulescu (born 2004), Romanian artistic gymnast
- Silviu Stănculescu (1932–1998), Romanian actor
- Ștefan Stănculescu (1923–2013), Romanian football player and coach
- Victor Stănculescu (1928–2016), Romanian general officer and politician

== See also ==
- Stanca (disambiguation)
