= 2007 European Artistic Gymnastics Championships =

2nd Individual European Artistic Gymnastics Championships
- Location: Amsterdam, Netherlands
- Dates: April 2007
- Nations: Members of the European Union of Gymnastics

The 2nd Individual European Artistic Gymnastics Championships for both men and women took place in Amsterdam in April 2007.

== Nations ==
Participating nations included:

- Albania
- Belarus
- Belgium
- Bulgaria
- Czech Republic
- France
- Germany
- Great Britain (United Kingdom)
- Greece
- Hungary
- Iceland
- Israel
- Italy
- Lithuania
- Portugal
- Romania
- Russia
- Spain
- Sweden
- Ukraine

== Medal winners ==
Event	Gold	Silver	Bronze
Men
All-Around	Maxim Deviatovski (RUS)	Fabian Hambüchen (GER)	Yury Ryazanov (RUS)
Floor	Rafael Martínez (ESP)	Thomas Bouhail (FRA)	Matthias Fahrig (GER); Eleftherios Kosmidis (GRE)
Pommel Horse	Krisztián Berki (HUN)	Daniel Keatings (GBR)	Flavius Koczi (ROU)
Still Rings	Oleksandr Vorobiov (UKR)	Yordan Yovchev (BUL); Andrea Coppolino (ITA)	none awarded
Vault	Anton Golotsutskov (RUS)	Raphael Wignanitz (FRA)	Jeffrey Wammes (NED)
Parallel Bars	Mitja Petkovšek (SLO)	Nikolai Kryukov (RUS)	Epke Zonderland (NED)
Horizontal Bar	Fabian Hambüchen (GER)	Aljaž Pegan (SLO)	Igor Cassina (ITA)
Women
All-Around	Vanessa Ferrari (ITA)	Sandra Izbaşa (ROU)	Alina Kozich (UKR)
Vault	Carlotta Giovannini (ITA)	Oksana Chusovitina (GER)	Anna Grudko (RUS)
Uneven Bars	Dariya Zgoba (UKR)	Steliana Nistor (ROU)	Ekaterina Kramarenko (RUS)
Balance Beam	Yulia Lozhechko (RUS)	Sandra Izbaşa (ROU)	Stefani Bismpikou (GRE); Steliana Nistor (ROU)
Floor Exercise	Vanessa Ferrari (ITA)	Beth Tweddle (GBR)	Alina Kozich (UKR)

== Men's results ==
=== Individual all-around ===
Rank	Gymnast	Floor (gymnastics)	Pommel horse	Rings (gymnastics)	Vault (gymnastics)	Parallel bars	Horizontal bar	Total
1st place, gold medalist(s)	(Russia) Maxim Deviatovski	14.525	14.925	15.100	16.250	15.575	13.875	90.250
2nd place, silver medalist(s)	(Germany) Fabian Hambüchen	15.225	13.575	14.450	15.825	15.200	15.400	89.675
3rd place, bronze medalist(s)	(Russia) Yury Ryazanov	14.475	14.275	15.075	15.650	15.100	14.425	89.000
4	(Spain) Rafael Martínez	13.975	13.675	14.900	16.075	15.200	14.600	88.425
5	(Romania) Flavius Koczi	14.800	14.900	13.750	16.550	13.775	14.050	87.825
6	(Netherlands) Epke Zonderland	14.175	14.000	13.750	15.650	15.375	14.725	87.675
6	(Portugal) Manuel Campos	14.700	14.275	14.150	15.300	15.050	14.200	87.675
6	(Romania) Răzvan Șelariu	15.100	14.525	14.650	16.150	14.625	12.625	87.675
9	(Netherlands) Jeffrey Wammes	15.175	12.875	13.875	16.250	14.475	14.950	87.600
10	(Belarus) Dmitri Savitski	14.575	12.700	15.200	16.100	14.725	14.250	87.550
11	(Georgia (country)) Ilia Giorgadze	14.325	13.650	14.525	15.650	15.125	14.075	87.350
11	(Italy) Enrico Pozzo	14.875	13.925	13.950	15.625	13.825	15.150	87.350
13	(United Kingdom) Daniel Keatings	14.450	15.600	13.075	15.550	15.075	13.475	87.225
14	(Germany) Robert Juckel	14.350	14.775	14.950	14.975	13.950	14.200	87.200
15	(France) Dmitri Karbanenko	14.650	13.950	13.025	16.125	14.725	14.650	87.125
16	(Switzerland) Claudio Capelli	15.100	14.225	13.800	15.150	14.875	13.725	86.875
17	(Croatia) Filip Ude	14.500	15.200	13.575	15.500	13.925	13.975	86.675
18	(Finland) Sami Aalto	14.500	14.025	14.325	15.625	14.075	13.825	86.375
19	(Italy) Matteo Morandi	12.925	13.200	16.050	15.525	14.825	13.700	86.225
20	(Armenia) Vahagn Stepanyan	13.850	14.225	14.600	14.275	15.100	12.700	84.750
21	(Switzerland) Nicolas Böschenstein	13.725	12.525	13.800	15.850	15.175	13.500	84.575
22	(Israel) Alexander Shatilov	14.050	13.600	13.700	15.475	13.975	13.700	84.500
23	(United Kingdom) Ross Brewer	14.100	13.275	14.175	14.825	14.375	13.300	84.050
24	(Hungary) Marcell Hetrovics	13.850	13.950	13.050	15.225	14.650	12.475	83.200

=== Floor exercise ===
Rank	Gymnast	Nation	Total
1st place, gold medalist(s)	Rafael Martínez	Spain	15.550
2nd place, silver medalist(s)	Thomas Bouhail	France	15.350
3rd place, bronze medalist(s)	Matthias Fahrig	Germany	15.275
3rd place, bronze medalist(s)	Eleftherios Kosmidis	Greece	15.275
5	Anton Golotsutskov	Russia	15.175
6	Enrico Pozzo	Italy	15.125
7	Marian Drăgulescu	Romania	14.300
8	Flavius Koczi	Romania	14.250

=== Pommel horse ===
Rank	Gymnast	Nation	Total
1st place, gold medalist(s)	Krisztián Berki	Hungary	15.800
2nd place, silver medalist(s)	Daniel Keatings	Great Britain	15.450
3rd place, bronze medalist(s)	Flavius Koczi	Romania	15.325
4	Louis Smith	Great Britain	15.300
5	Nikolai Kryukov	Russia	14.975
5	Donna-Donny Truyens	Belgium	14.975
7	Filip Ude	Croatia	14.325
8	Robert Seligman	Croatia	12.425

=== Rings ===
Rank	Gymnast	Nation	Total
1st place, gold medalist(s)	Oleksandr Vorobiov	Ukraine	16.325
2nd place, silver medalist(s)	Yordan Yovchev	Bulgaria	16.200
2nd place, silver medalist(s)	Andrea Coppolino	Italy	16.200
4	Konstantin Pluzhnikov	Russia	15.800
5	Matteo Morandi	Italy	15.375
6	Thomas Andergassen	Germany	15.350
7	Dmitri Savitski	Belarus	15.025
8	Dmitri Kaspiarovich	Belarus	14.850

=== Vault ===
Rank	Gymnast	Nation	Vault 1	Vault 2	Total
1st place, gold medalist(s)	Anton Golotsutskov	Russia	16.425	16.650	16.537
2nd place, silver medalist(s)	Raphael Wignanitz	France	16.425	16.200	16.312
3rd place, bronze medalist(s)	Jeffrey Wammes	Netherlands	16.300	16.175	16.237
4	Matthias Fahrig	Germany	16.300	16.050	16.175
5	Marian Drăgulescu	Romania	16.625	15.575	16.100
6	Leszek Blanik	Poland	16.450	15.525	15.987
7	Dmitri Kaspiarovich	Belarus	16.050	15.250	15.650
8	Oleksandr Yakubovsky	Ukraine	15.725	15.300	15.512

=== Parallel bars ===
Rank	Gymnast	Nation	Total
1st place, gold medalist(s)	Mitja Petkovšek	Slovenia	15.875
2nd place, silver medalist(s)	Nikolai Kryukov	Russia	15.450
3rd place, bronze medalist(s)	Epke Zonderland	Netherlands	15.400
4	Yann Cucherat	France	15.325
5	Sergei Khorokhordin	Russia	15.175
6	Dmitri Karbanenko	France	15.075
7	Dmitri Kaspiarovich	Belarus	14.900
8	Rafael Martínez	Spain	14.750

=== Horizontal bar ===
Rank	Gymnast	Nation	Total
1st place, gold medalist(s)	Fabian Hambüchen	Germany	16.025
2nd place, silver medalist(s)	Aljaž Pegan	Slovenia	15.675
3rd place, bronze medalist(s)	Igor Cassina	Italy	15.575
4	Dmitri Karbanenko	France	15.250
4	Yann Cucherat	France	15.250
6	Roman Kulesza	Poland	14.875
7	Ümit Şamiloğlu	Turkey	14.600
8	Christoph Schärer	Switzerland	14.050

== Women's results ==
=== Individual all-around ===
Rank	Gymnast	Nation	Vault (gymnastics)	Uneven bars	Balance beam	Floor (gymnastics)	Total
1st place, gold medalist(s)	Vanessa Ferrari	Italy	14.925	15.700	15.375	15.075	61.075
2nd place, silver medalist(s)	Sandra Izbașa	Romania	14.475	14.325	15.625	15.475	59.900
3rd place, bronze medalist(s)	Alina Kozich	Ukraine	14.675	14.250	15.675	14.700	59.300
4	Steliana Nistor	Romania	14.375	15.425	14.625	14.750	59.175
5	Ekaterina Kramarenko	Russia	14.175	15.025	14.850	14.775	58.875
6	Oksana Chusovitina	Germany	14.850	14.500	14.800	14.300	58.450
7	Kristýna Pálešová	Czech Republic	14.000	15.175	14.175	14.325	57.675
8	Kristina Pravdina	Russia	14.125	13.300	14.900	14.350	56.675
9	Verona van de Leur	Netherlands	13.950	14.050	14.650	13.575	56.225
10	Anja Brinker	Germany	13.875	15.550	12.625	13.975	56.025
11	Dariya Zgoba	Ukraine	12.725	15.575	14.250	13.275	55.825
12	Stefani Bismpikou	Greece	13.675	13.450	14.900	13.725	55.750
13	Cassy Véricel	France	13.950	14.025	13.000	14.650	55.625
14	Federica Macrì	Italy	14.275	14.125	13.850	13.350	55.600
15	Patricia Moreno	Spain	13.450	13.575	15.050	13.400	55.475
16	Gaelle Mys	Belgium	13.725	12.300	14.700	14.175	54.900
17	Lichelle Wong	Netherlands	13.950	13.175	13.750	13.950	54.825
18	Viktoria Karpenko	Bulgaria	13.500	13.750	13.950	13.525	54.725
19	Veronica Wagner	Sweden	14.075	12.425	13.950	14.150	54.600
20	Hannah Clowes	Great Britain	13.850	13.825	13.950	13.775	54.550
21	Nicole Pechancová	Czech Republic	13.075	14.275	13.100	13.450	53.900
22	Jelena Zanevskaja	Lithuania	13.000	13.975	13.250	13.600	53.825
23	Mercedes Alcaide	Spain	13.400	13.075	13.150	14.050	53.675
24	Nastassia Marachkouskaya	Belarus	–	11.650	12.000	–	23.650

=== Vault ===
Rank	Gymnast	Nation	Vault 1	Vault 2	Total
1st place, gold medalist(s)	Carlotta Giovannini	Italy	15.000	14.625	14.812
2nd place, silver medalist(s)	Oksana Chusovitina	Germany	14.500	14.950	14.725
3rd place, bronze medalist(s)	Anna Grudko	Russia	15.050	14.200	14.625
4	Yulia Lozhechko	Russia	14.250	14.650	14.450
5	Jana Komrsková	Czech Republic	14.300	14.400	14.350
6	Marissa King	Great Britain	14.600	13.750	14.175
7	Enikő Korcsmáros	Hungary	14.475	13.550	14.012
8	Sandra Izbașa	Romania	14.600	13.350	13.975

=== Uneven bars ===
Rank	Gymnast	Nation	Total
1st place, gold medalist(s)	Dariya Zgoba	Ukraine	15.775
2nd place, silver medalist(s)	Steliana Nistor	Romania	15.725
3rd place, bronze medalist(s)	Ekaterina Kramarenko	Russia	15.425
4	Katheleen Lindor	France	14.700
5	Jana Šikulová	Czech Republic	14.675
6	Vanessa Ferrari	Italy	14.375
7	Anja Brinker	Germany	13.600
8	Lichelle Wong	Netherlands	12.925

=== Balance beam ===
Rank	Gymnast	Nation	Total
1st place, gold medalist(s)	Yulia Lozhechko	Russia	15.675
2nd place, silver medalist(s)	Sandra Izbașa	Romania	15.525
3rd place, bronze medalist(s)	Stefani Bismpikou	Greece	15.475
3rd place, bronze medalist(s)	Steliana Nistor	Romania	15.475
5	Alina Kozich	Ukraine	15.450
6	Kristina Pravdina	Russia	15.250
7	Iryna Krasnianska	Ukraine	15.225
8	Vanessa Ferrari	Italy	13.550

=== Floor exercise ===
Rank	Gymnast	Nation	Total
1st place, gold medalist(s)	Vanessa Ferrari	Italy	15.400
2nd place, silver medalist(s)	Beth Tweddle	Great Britain	15.250
3rd place, bronze medalist(s)	Alina Kozich	Ukraine	15.050
4	Cassy Véricel	France	14.625
5	Steliana Nistor	Romania	14.600
6	Oksana Chusovitina	Germany	14.450
7	Patricia Moreno	Spain	14.375
-	Sandra Izbașa	Romania	-

== Medal Count ==
=== Combined ===
Rank	Nation	Gold	Silver	Bronze	Total
1	Russia	3	1	3	7
2	Italy	3	1	1	5
3	Ukraine	2	0	2	4
4	Germany	1	2	1	4
5	Slovenia	1	1	0	2
6	Hungary	1	0	0	1
6	Spain	1	0	0	1
8	Romania	0	3	2	5
9	France	0	2	0	2
9	Great Britain	0	2	0	2
11	Bulgaria	0	1	0	1
12	Greece	0	0	2	2
12	Netherlands	0	0	2	2
Totals (13 entries)		12	13	13	38

=== Men ===
Rank	Nation	Gold	Silver	Bronze	Total
1	Russia	2	1	1	4
2	Germany	1	1	1	3
3	Slovenia	1	1	0	2
4	Hungary	1	0	0	1
4	Spain	1	0	0	1
4	Ukraine	1	0	0	1
7	France	0	2	0	2
8	Italy	0	1	1	2
9	Bulgaria	0	1	0	1
9	Great Britain	0	1	0	1
11	Netherlands	0	0	2	2
12	Greece	0	0	1	1
12	Romania	0	0	1	1
Totals (13 entries)		7	8	7	22

=== Women ===
Rank	Nation	Gold	Silver	Bronze	Total
1	Italy	3	0	0	3
2	Russia	1	0	2	3
2	Ukraine	1	0	2	3
4	Romania	0	3	1	4
5	Germany	0	1	0	1
5	Great Britain	0	1	0	1
7	Greece	0	0	1	1
Totals (7 entries)		5	5	6	16
