= Nadezhda Ivanova =

Nadezhda Ivanova may refer to:

- Nadezhda Ivanova (gymnast)
- Nadezhda Ivanova (footballer)
