= Monica Bergamelli =

Italian artistic gymnast

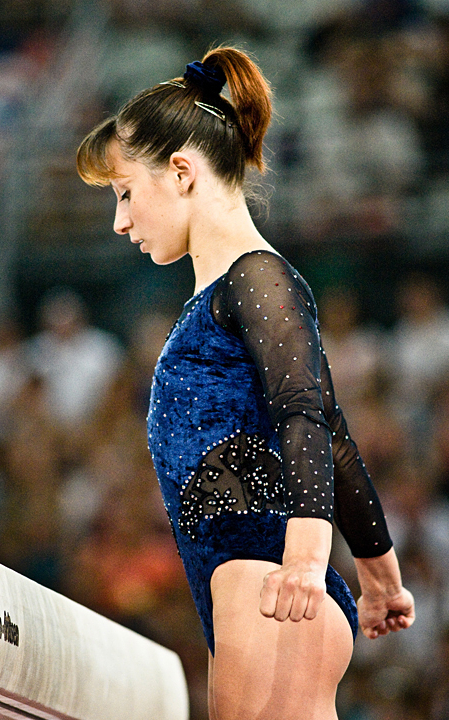
- Bergamelli in 2008

Personal information
- Full name: Monica Roberta Bergamelli
- Born: 24 May 1984 (age 42) Alzano Lombardo, Lombardy, Italy
- Height: 152 cm (5 ft 0 in)

Gymnastics career
- Discipline: Women's artistic gymnastics
- Country represented: Italy
- Club: Brixia Brescia
- Head coach: Enrico Casella
- Assistant coach: Paolo Pedrotti
- Retired: 2008
Medal record
Representing Italy
European Championships
Gold medal – first place	2006 Volos	Team
Bronze medal – third place	2002 Patras	Team
Mediterranean Games
Gold medal – first place	2005 Almería	Team
Silver medal – second place	2001 Tunis	Team
Silver medal – second place	2001 Tunis	Vault
Silver medal – second place	2001 Tunis	Uneven bars

Monica Roberta Bergamelli (born 24 May 1984 in Alzano Lombardo) is a former Italian artistic gymnast who represented Italy at the 2000, 2004, and 2008 Olympic Games. She was a member of the Italian team that won the gold medal at the 2006 European Championships.

== Career ==
Bergamelli's first major international competition was the 1998 Junior European Championships. She helped the Italian team win the bronze medal behind Ukraine and Romania, and Bergamelli won the silver medal on the balance beam behind Ukrainian gymnast Olha Rozshchupkina. She competed at the 1999 World Championships and finished thirteenth in the all-around final.

Bergamelli competed at the 2000 European Championships and helped the Italian team finish fifth. Individually, she finished eleventh in the all-around final. She was then selected to compete at the 2000 Olympic Games alongside Adriana Crisci, Martina Bremini, Irene Castelli, Alice Capitani, and Laura Trefiletti, and the team finished eleventh in the qualification round. Bergamelli qualified for the all-around final where she finished eighteenth.

Bergamelli competed at the 2001 Mediterranean Games where the Italian team won the silver medal behind Spain. Individually, she won the silver medal on vault and on the uneven bars. At the 2001 Stuttgart World Cup, she won the silver medal on the uneven bars behind Australian gymnast Jacqui Dunn. Then at the 2002 Cottbus World Cup, she won the bronze medal on the uneven bars behind Beth Tweddle and Dunn. She competed at the 2002 European Championships with Maria Teresa Gargano and Ilaria Colombo, and they won the team bronze medal behind Russia and the Netherlands. Individually, she finished twelfth in the all-around final, eighth on vault, and fifth on the uneven bars.

Bergamelli finished sixteenth in the all-around final at the 2003 World Championships. She then went to the 2004 European Championships and helped the Italian team finish sixth. She finished eleventh in the all-around final. Bergamelli won the gold medal in the all-around at the 2004 Italian Championships. Although Italy did not qualify a team to the 2004 Olympic Games, Bergamelli qualified as an individual. She competed in the qualification round and placed fifty-fourth in the all-around.

Bergamelli finished tenth in the all-around final at the 2005 European Championships. She then went to the 2005 Mediterranean Games and helped the Italian team win the gold medal. At the 2005 World Championships, she finished thirteenth in the all-around final.

At the 2006 European Championships, the Italian team of Bergamelli, Vanessa Ferrari, Carlotta Giovannini, Federica Macrì, and Lia Parolari won the gold medal in the team competition. She also competed at the 2007 World Championships where the Italian team finished fourth.

At the 2008 City of Jesolo Trophy, the Italian team won the silver medal behind the United States. Then at the 2008 European Championships, Bergamelli helped the Italian team finish fourth. She was then selected to compete at the 2008 Olympic Games alongside Vanessa Ferrari, Carlotta Giovannini, Lia Parolari, Francesca Benolli, and Federica Macrì, and they finished tenth in the qualification round. Bergamelli retired from competition after the 2008 Olympics.

== See also ==
- List of Olympic female gymnasts for Italy
