= Jelena Zanevskaja =

Lithuanian artistic gymnast (born 1987)

Jelena Zanevskaya
- Born: 2 April 1987 (age 39) Vilnius, Lithuania
- Height: 162 cm (5 ft 4 in)

Gymnastics career
- Discipline: Women's artistic gymnastics
- Country represented: Lithuania

Jelena Zanevskaya (born 2 April 1987) is a Lithuanian artistic gymnast who competed at the 2008 Summer Olympics.

== Career ==
Zanevskaya began gymnastics when he was three years old.

Zanevskaya competed at her first World Championships in 2003 and finished 98th in the all-around during the qualification round. At the 2004 European Championships, she finished 32nd in the all-around during the qualification round, missing out on the final by less than one point. She won the all-around title at the 2005 Lithuanian Championships. She then finished in 36th place at the 2005 World Championships and still did not advance to the finals.

Zanevskaya competed on the uneven bars, balance beam, and floor exercise at the 2006 European Championships and did not advance into any of the finals. She successfully defended her all-around title at the Lithuanian Championships. Then at the 2006 World Championships, she finished 56th in the all-around during the qualification round. She advanced to the all-around final at the 2007 European Championships and finished 22nd. She then finished 84th in the all-around during the qualification round at the 2007 World Championships.

Zanevskaya tied with Turkish gymnast Göksu Üçtaş Şanlı for a 20th-place finish in the all-around at the 2008 European Championships. She finished 14th in the vault qualification rankings, missing out on the final. She then represented Lithuania at the 2008 Summer Olympics and finished 54th in the all-around during the qualification round and did not advance to the final. Her best apparatus result was on the vault, where she finished 13th.

== Personal life ==
Zanevskaya studied in the Faculty of Sports and Health at Vilnius University.
