= Katja Abel =

German artistic gymnast

- Born: 8 April 1983 (age 43) East Berlin, East Germany
- Height: 1.65 m (5 ft 5 in)

Gymnastics career
- Discipline: Women's artistic gymnastics
- Country represented: Germany
- Club: SC Berlin
Medal record
Representing Germany
European Championships
Bronze medal – third place	2006 Volos	Vault

Katja Abel (born April 8, 1983) is a German artistic gymnast. She competed at the 2008 Summer Olympics. Abel helped the German team finish in 12th place. Her best individual result was 32nd place on uneven bars. Her most notable achievement is a bronze medal on vault at the 2006 European Women's Artistic Gymnastics Championships.

== Biography ==
Abel started training in gymnastics with her mother Irene Abel, an Olympic medalist in 1972. Her career was marred with injuries that stopped her from competing in the 2000 and 2004 Olympics. First she had back problems throughout 2000. Later, on 6 February 2004 she fractured bones in both forearms after falling from uneven bars. She had a long recovery, and in 2005 competed only on balance beam, with a minimum load on her arms. In 2006, she won a European bronze medal on vault, but later during the year she suffered ligament injuries in both feet and missed the world championships. Those injuries required two surgeries in 2008 and 2009 and resulted in her skipping the vault at the 2008 Olympics. In early 2007 she moved from her native Berlin to Stuttgart, seeking a team environment. In Stuttgart she trained with Marie-Sophie Hindermann and Kim Bui under the guidance of Tamara Khokhlova and Elena Dolgopolova.

She retired from competitions after the 2008 Olympics. After returning to Berlin, she moved to the Technical University of Ilmenau to study sports and biology.
