= Maryna Proskurina =

Ukrainian artistic gymnast (born 1985)

- Born: 12 August 1985 (age 41)

Gymnastics career
- Discipline: Women's artistic gymnastics
- Country represented: Ukraine (2008)
Medal record
Women's artistic gymnastics
Representing Ukraine
European Championships
Bronze medal – third place	2006 Volos	Balance beam
Summer Universiade
Silver medal – second place	2007 Bangkok	Team
Bronze medal – third place	2005 Izmir	Vault

Maryna Proskurina (born 12 August 1985) is a former Ukrainian female artistic gymnast who represented her nation at international competitions.

She participated at the 2008 Summer Olympics in Beijing, China, and the 2007 World Artistic Gymnastics Championships. Her floor was choreographed by Oksana Omelianchik.

== See also ==
- List of Olympic female artistic gymnasts for Ukraine
