= Lia Parolari =

Italian artistic gymnast

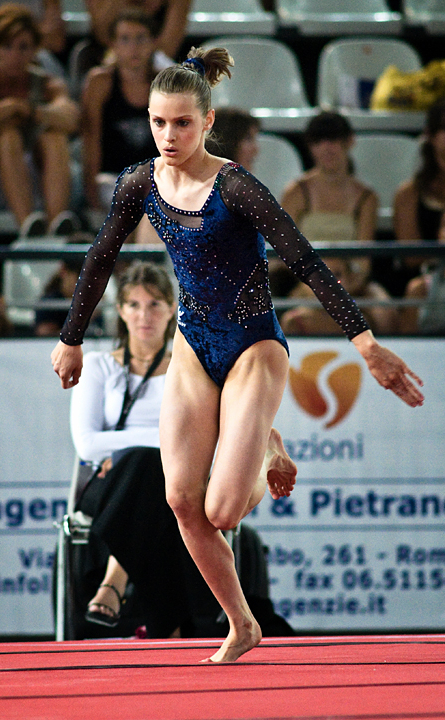
- Parolari in 2008

Personal information
- Born: 30 July 1990 (age 36) Orzinuovi, Italy
- Height: 1.60 m (5 ft 3 in)

Gymnastics career
- Discipline: Women's artistic gymnastics
- Country represented: Italy
- Club: Estate '83
- Retired: 2012
Medal record
Representing Italy
European Championships
Gold medal – first place	2006 Volos	Team

Lia Parolari (born 30 July 1990) is an Italian former artistic gymnast who represented Italy at the 2008 Summer Olympics where she finished fourteenth in the individual all-around final. Parolari was a member of the Italian team that won a gold medal at the 2006 European Championships. She is the 2008 Italian Champion in the all-around.

== Gymnastics career ==
Parolari competed alongside Vanessa Ferrari, Monica Bergamelli, Federica Macrì, and Carlotta Giovannini at the 2006 European Championships and helped Italy win their first European team gold medal by competing on the uneven bars, balance beam, and floor exercise. She also competed at the 2007 World Championships with Ferrari, Bergamelli, Macrì, Francesca Benolli, and Silvia Zanolo where the Italian team finished fourth behind the United States, China, and Romania.

Parolari won a silver medal with the Italian team at the inaugural 2008 City of Jesolo Trophy. She then competed at the 2008 European Championships where the Italian team finished fourth, and Parolari finished sixth in the uneven bars event final. She won the gold medal in the all-around at the 2008 Italian Championships with a total score of 57.700. She was then selected to compete at the 2008 Olympic Games alongside Vanessa Ferrari, Carlotta Giovannini, Monica Bergamelli, Francesca Benolli, and Federica Macrì, and they finished tenth in the qualification round. Parolari qualified for the all-around final where she finished fourteenth with a total score of 58.925.

At the 2009 City of Jesolo Trophy, Parolari won the all-around gold medal along with a team gold medal. She then competed at the 2009 European Championships and qualified for the floor exercise event final where she finished eighth after falling. Her final major international competition was the 2010 World Championships where she helped the Italian team finish eighth. She was the alternate for the Italian team at the 2011 World Championships.

Parolari announced her retirement in 2012 and began coaching at her home club, Estate '83.

== Eponymous skill ==
Parolari has an uneven bars dismount named after her in the Code of Points.

Apparatus	Name	Description	Difficulty (Note: Valid for the 2025–2028 Code of Points)
Uneven bars	Parolari	On high bar – salto backward tucked	C (0.3)

== See also ==
- List of Olympic female artistic gymnasts for Italy
