= Lenika de Simone =

Spanish artistic gymnast

Lenika De Simone
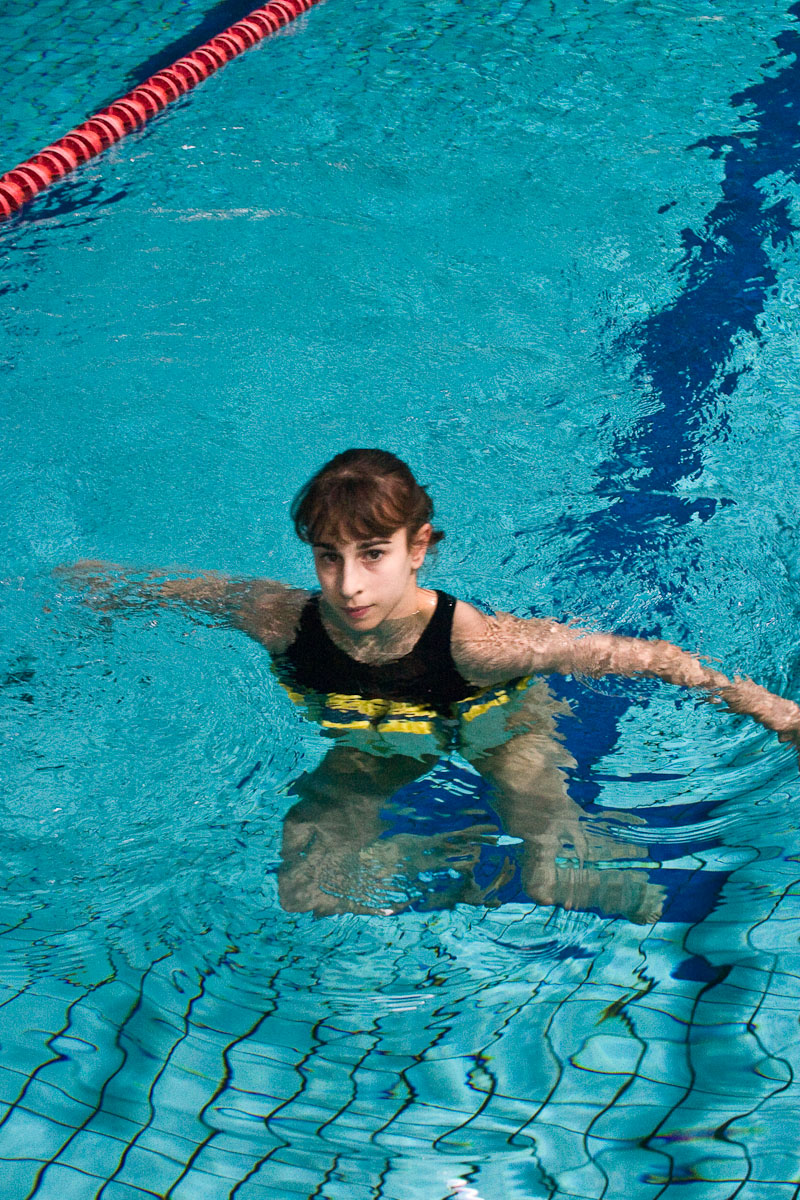

Personal information
- Full name: Lenika de Simone Blanco
- Born: 29 August 1988 (age 38) Hollywood, Florida, U.S.

Gymnastics career
- Discipline: Women's artistic gymnastics
- Country represented: Spain (2002-2008)
Medal record
Women's gymnastics
Representing Spain
European Championships
Silver medal – second place	2006 Volos	Balance beam
Bronze medal – third place	2006 Volos	Uneven bars
Mediterranean Games
Bronze medal – third place	2005 Almería	Team
Bronze medal – third place	2005 Almería	Uneven bars

Lenika De Simone (born 29 August 1988) is a Spanish former female artistic gymnast, who represented her nation at international competitions.

She participated at the 2008 Summer Olympics in Beijing, China, and the 2007 World Artistic Gymnastics Championships.
