= Alina Stănculescu =

Romanian artistic gymnast

- Full name: Alina Georgiana Stănculescu
- Born: 23 April 1990 (age 36) Bucharest, Romania

Gymnastics career
- Discipline: Women's artistic gymnastics
- Country represented: Romania
- Club: CSS 3 Steaua Bucharest
- Head coach: Nicolae Forminte
- Former coach: Octavian Bellu
Medal record
European Championships
Silver medal – second place	2006 Volos	Team

Alina Georgiana Stănculescu (born 29 April 1990) is a Romanian former artistic gymnast. She won a silver medal in the team event at the 2006 European Championships. Earlier in her career, she won the balance beam title at the 2004 Junior European Championships, and she won two silver medals at the 2005 European Youth Olympic Festival.

== Gymnastics career ==
Stănculescu placed sixth in the junior all-around at the 2004 Romanian Championships. She was selected to compete at the 2004 Junior European Championships in Amsterdam, where the Romanian team won the silver medal behind Russia. Individually, she advanced to the balance beam final and won the gold medal with a score of 9.312.

At the 2005 European Youth Olympic Festival, Stănculescu helped Romania win the silver medal in the team event alongside Sandra Izbașa and Andrea Stanescu. She also won a silver medal on the balance beam, behind Russia's Karina Myasnikova.

Stănculescu competed at the 2006 European Championships in Volos with a stress fracture in her left tibia, helping the Romanian team win the silver medal by competing on the balance beam and the floor exercise. After this competition, she had surgery to repair her damaged tibia and could not train for over a year.

After injuring her right leg two weeks before the 2008 Summer Olympics, Stănculescu retired from gymnastics.

== Personal life ==
Stănculescu graduated from the National University of Physical Education and Sport. She became a make-up artist, and in 2014, she opened her own beauty salon in Bucharest.
