= Anja Brinker =

German artistic gymnast (born 1991)

- Born: 18 January 1991 (age 35) Melle, Germany
- Height: 1.52 m (5 ft 0 in)

Gymnastics career
- Discipline: Women's artistic gymnastics
- Country represented: Germany
- Club: TV Herkenrath
- Head coach: Ulla Koch
- Assistant coach: Oleg Tchekmarov
- Former coach: Dieter Koch
Medal record
European Championships
Bronze medal – third place	2009 Milan	Uneven bars
Junior European Championships
Bronze medal – third place	2007 Amsterdam	Team

Anja Brinker (born 18 January 1991) is a retired German artistic gymnast.

Brinker started gymnastics in her hometown of Melle at age 6 before moving to Hanover for better training conditions. When she was 13, the training center there closed and she switched to a national training center in Bergisch Gladbach. She was initially coached by Dieter Koch, the husband of the German national coach Ulla Koch, and later by Oleg Tchekmarov.

In 2004, she won gold on uneven bars at the German Junior National Championships and placed third in the all-around. The next year, she became junior national champion in the all-around and on vault, and earned second place on floor and third place on bars.

In 2006, she took part in the Junior European Championships in Volos, Greece. With Marie-Sophie Hindermann, Joeline Möbius, Lisa-Katharina Hill and Dorothee Henzler, she won a bronze medal in the team competition. She placed nineteenth in the all-around and qualified for the bars event final, where she finished seventh.

2007 was Brinker's first year as a senior. She won gold on bars, silver on floor and silver in the all-around at the national championships and competed at the Ghent World Cup, where she was fourth on bars. At the 2007 European Championships in Amsterdam, she placed tenth in the all-around and sixth on bars. Later that year, she competed at the 2007 World Championships in Stuttgart, where she placed eighteenth in the all-around. The German team finished tenth, qualifying a full women's gymnastics team for the Olympics for the first time since 1992.

Despite injuries at the beginning of 2008, Brinker was named to the German team for the 2008 Olympic Games in Beijing. There, she competed only on her best event, the uneven bars. She made a mistake on her dismount and scored 15.125, missing the bars final. The team finished 12th and last in qualifications.
