= Olga Sherbatykh =

Ukrainian artistic gymnast (born 1988)

- Born: May 2, 1988 (age 38)

Gymnastics career
- Discipline: Women's artistic gymnastics
- Country represented: Ukraine (2004-2007)
Medal record
Women's artistic gymnastics
Representing Ukraine
European Championships
Silver medal – second place	2004 Amsterdam	Team
Silver medal – second place	2006 Volos	Vault
Summer Universiade
Gold medal – first place	2007 Bangkok	Vault
Silver medal – second place	2007 Bangkok	All-around
Silver medal – second place	2007 Bangkok	Team

Olga Sherbatykh (born 2 May 1988) is a Ukrainian former artistic gymnast. She participated at the 2004 Summer Olympics. She also competed at world championships, including the 2008 Artistic Gymnastics World Cup Final in Madrid, Spain.

== See also ==
- List of Olympic female artistic gymnasts for Ukraine
