= Yulia Lozhechko =

Russian artistic gymnast

- Born: December 14, 1989 (age 36) Bryansk, Russia

Gymnastics career
Medal record
Women's artistic gymnastics
Representing Russia
Event	1st	2nd	3rd
World Cup Final	0	1	0
European Championships	1	0	2
Summer Universiade	0	0	1
World Cup Final
Silver medal – second place	2008 Madrid	Balance Beam
European Championships
Gold medal – first place	2007 Amsterdam	Balance Beam
Bronze medal – third place	2005 Debrecen	All-Around
Bronze medal – third place	2006 Volos	Team
Universiade
Bronze medal – third place	2011 Shenzhen	Team

Yulia Aleksandrovna Lozhechko (Russian: Юлия Александровна Ложечко; born December 14, 1989) is a Russian artistic gymnast. She is the 2007 European champion on the balance beam.

== Personal life ==
Lozhechko was born on December 14, 1989, in Bryansk, Russia. She is the only child of Olga and Aleksandr. She collects angel figurines and loves cats.

== Career ==
Lozhechko began gymnastics at age 7, coached by her mother Olga. After her talent was noted, she was sent to train at Round Lake as part of the Russian national team.

Lozhechko competed at the 2004 Junior European Championships where she won a gold medal as part of the Russian Team. She also won a silver medal on the balance beam and a bronze medal in the All Around final. She also qualified to the floor and uneven bars finals.

In 2005, Lozhechko became age-eligible for senior competition. She won a bronze medal in the All Around at the 2005 European Championships behind Marina Debauve of France and fellow Russian Anna Pavlova. At the World Championships later that year, she qualified to the balance beam final but failed to medal after a fall left her in 7th position. At the 2006 European Championships, she was part of the Russian team which won the bronze medal. Although she did not win an individual medal, she did qualify to two event finals - uneven bars and balance beam. She was selected to compete at the 2006 World Championships, but broke fingers in training and had to withdraw.

The highlight so far of Lozhechko's career came at the 2007 European Championships where she won the Gold Medal on the balance beam with a score of 15.675. She also placed 4th in the vault final. Lozhechko was selected for the Russian Team for the 2007 World Championships. The Russian team was set to medal until an error from Ekaterina Kramarenko which nullified her vault left the Russians in 8th. Despite this, the team qualified for the 2008 Summer Olympics where Lozhechko was included in the squad but did not compete.

Lozhechko and teammate Maxim Devyatovski were banned from the national training center in Round Lake after the 2007 Worlds. During the preliminary competition, she changed her balance beam routine in order to qualify for the event final but fell. She was allowed to return in December 2007 but she and the head coach Kiryashov are still feuding. Kiryashov blamed Lozhechko's poor performance on "psychological problems. I know exactly what they are, but I don't want to talk about it. When she listened to us, the coaches, everything was fine, but as soon as she tries to do everything on her own and to her own taste she has immediate problems. We know that Lozhechko is going through hard times. But we are trying to help, and I hope soon everything will be fine again."

Lozhechko's favourite apparatus is floor and she admires Alexei Nemov, Aleksei Bondarenko and Svetlana Khorkina.

== Competitive history ==
Year	Event	Team	AA	VT	UB	BB	FX
2005	European Championships		3rd				6th
2005	World Championships					7th	
2006	European Championships	3rd			4th	6th	
2007	European Championships			4th		1st	
2007	World Championships	8th	8th				
2008	World Cup Final					2nd	
2011	Universiade	3rd					

Year	Competition description	Location	Apparatus	Rank-Final	Score-Final	Rank-Qualifying	Score-Qualifying
2008	World Cup Final	Madrid	Balance beam	2	15.200		
2007	World Championships	Stuttgart	Team	8	164.525	4	238.000
2007	World Championships	Stuttgart	All-around	8	59.250	13	58.400
2007	World Championships	Stuttgart	Unevne bars			50	14.250
2007	World Championships	Stuttgart	Balance beam			13	15.375
2007	World Championships	Stuttgart	Floor exercise			38	14.025
2007	European Championships	Amsterdam	Vault	4	14.450	4	14.212
2007	European Championships	Amsterdam	Balance beam	1	15.675	5	15.575
2007	European Championships	Amsterdam	Floor exercise			33	13.525
2006	European Championships	Volos	Team	3	173.375	1	176.150
2006	European Championships	Volos	Uneven bars	4	14.625	4	15.100
2006	European Championships	Volos	Balance beam	6	14.925	2	15.600
2005	World Championships	Melbourne	Balance beam	7	8.350	5	9.337
2005	World Championships	Melbourne	Floor exercise			22	8.812
2005	European Championships	Debrecen	All-around	3	36.749	6	36.161
2005	European Championships	Debrecen	Uneven bars			12	9.137
2005	European Championships	Debrecen	Balance beam			13	8.787
2005	European Championships	Debrecen	Floor exercise	6	8.962	5	9.150
