= 2005 European Youth Summer Olympic Festival =

2005 European Youth Olympic Festival
- Host city: Lignano Sabbiadoro
- Country: Italy
- Nations: 48
- Athletes: 3,965
- Sport: 11
- Events: 109
- Opening: 3 July 2005
- Closing: 8 July 2005
- Opened by: Riccardo Illy; President of the Region Friuli-Venezia Giulia
- Torch lighter: Cinzia Cona
- Main venue: Stadio Guido Teghil

Summer

Winter

The 2005 European Youth Summer Olympic Festival was held in Lignano Sabbiadoro, Italy.

== Sports ==
2005 European Youth Summer Olympic Festival Sports Programme
- Athletics (33)
- Basketball (1)
- Canoeing (16)
- Cycling (3)
- Football (1)
- Gymnastics (6)
- Handball (1)
- Judo (15)
- Swimming (31)
- Tennis (3)
- Volleyball (1)

== Venues ==
Venue	Location	Sports
Stadio Guido Teghil	Lignano Sabbiadoro	Athletics
Palasport Lignano	Lignano Sabbiadoro	Basketball
Bacino Nautico di Via Famula	San Giorgio di Nogaro	Canoeing
Azzano Decimo Streets	Azzano Decimo	Cycling
Stadio Comunale Latisana	Latisana	Football
Stadio Comunale San Giorgio di Nogaro	San Giorgio di Nogaro	Football
Latisana Indoor Stadium	Latisana	Gmnastics
Palazzetto dello Sport San Vito al Tagliamento	San Vito al Tagliamento	Handball
Palazzetto dello Sport San Giorgio di Nogaro	San Giorgio di Nogaro	Volleyball
Palasport Lignano	Lignano Sabbiadoro	Judo
Piscina Olimpionica Lignano	Lignano Sabbiadoro	Swimming
Lignano Tennis Club	Lignano Sabbiadoro	Tennis

== Calendar ==
OC	Opening ceremony	●	Event competitions	1	Event finals	CC	Closing ceremony

July 2005	3rd Sun	4th Mon	5th Tue	6th Wed	7th Thu	8th Fri	Gold Medals
Ceremonies	OC					CC	
Athletics		1	4	11	4	10	33
Basketball		●	●	●	●	1	1
Canoeing		●	8	●	8		16
Cycling			1	1	1		3
Football		●	●	●		1	1
Gymnastics			●		●	6	6
Handball		●	●	●	●	1	1
Judo		4	4	4	3		15
Swimming		8	7		8	8	31
Tennis		●	●	●	●	3	3
Volleyball		●	●	●	●	1	1
Total Gold Medals		13	24	16	27	31	111
Cumulative Total		13	37	53	80	111	111

== Mascot ==
The mascot for the 2005 European Youth Olympic Festival is Coki, a seagull.

== Participating nations ==
Participating National Olympic Committees
- Albania
- Andorra
- Armenia
- Austria
- Azerbaijan
- Belarus
- Belgium
- Bosnia and Herzegovina
- Bulgaria
- Croatia
- Cyprus
- Czech Republic
- Denmark
- Estonia (58)
- Finland
- FYR Macedonia
- France
- Georgia
- Germany
- Great Britain
- Greece
- Hungary
- Iceland
- Ireland
- Israel
- Italy
- Latvia
- Liechtenstein
- Lithuania
- Luxembourg
- Malta
- Moldova
- Monaco
- Netherlands
- Norway
- Poland
- Portugal
- Romania
- Russia
- San Marino
- Serbia and Montenegro
- Slovakia
- Slovenia
- Spain
- Sweden
- Switzerland
- Turkey
- Ukraine

== Medal table ==
* Host nation (Italy)

Rank	Nation	Gold	Silver	Bronze	Total
1	Russia (RUS)	15	16	12	43
2	Italy (ITA)*	14	8	14	36
3	Great Britain (GBR)	13	5	5	23
4	Germany (GER)	7	11	7	25
5	Netherlands (NED)	6	2	4	12
6	Spain (ESP)	5	7	5	17
7	Ukraine (UKR)	4	6	3	13
8	Belarus (BLR)	4	4	2	10
9	Belgium (BEL)	4	1	6	11
10	Slovenia (SLO)	4	1	2	7
11	Estonia (EST)	4	1	0	5
12	Hungary (HUN)	3	9	10	22
13	Georgia (GEO)	3	0	1	4
14	Latvia (LAT)	2	3	4	9
14	Portugal (POR)	2	3	4	9
16	Croatia (CRO)	2	2	0	4
17	Israel (ISR)	2	1	3	6
18	Austria (AUT)	2	1	2	5
19	Azerbaijan (AZE)	2	0	4	6
20	Denmark (DEN)	2	0	2	4
21	Poland (POL)	1	5	3	9
22	Romania (ROU)	1	5	2	8
23	Serbia and Montenegro (SCG)	1	2	2	5
24	Switzerland (SUI)	1	2	1	4
25	Sweden (SWE)	1	2	0	3
26	France (FRA)	1	1	8	10
27	Bulgaria (BUL)	1	1	0	2
27	Turkey (TUR)	1	1	0	2
29	Cyprus (CYP)	1	0	0	1
30	Czech Republic (CZE)	0	3	3	6
31	Moldova (MDA)	0	2	4	6
32	Ireland (IRL)	0	2	3	5
33	Norway (NOR)	0	1	2	3
34	Greece (GRE)	0	1	0	1
35	Lithuania (LTU)	0	0	5	5
36	Slovakia (SVK)	0	0	3	3
37	Armenia (ARM)	0	0	1	1
Totals (37 entries)		109	109	127	345
