= Nadezhda Ivanova (gymnast) =

Russian artistic gymnast

- Born: 3 August 1990 (age 36)

Gymnastics career
- Discipline: Women's artistic gymnastics
- Country represented: Russia (2006)

Nadezhda Ivanova (born 3 August 1990) is a retired Russian artistic gymnast.

As a junior, she won the gold medal in the junior team event at the 2004 European Women's Artistic Gymnastics Championships. Two years later, she won the bronze medal in the team event at the 2006 European Women's Artistic Gymnastics Championships.
