= Polina Miller (gymnast) =

Russian artistic gymnast

- Born: November 23, 1988 (age 37) Leningrad, Russian SFSR, Soviet Union

Gymnastics career
- Discipline: Women's artistic gymnastics
- Country represented: Russia
Medal record
Representing Russia
Artistic Gymnastics
World Championships
| Bronze medal – third place | 2006 Aarhus | Team |
European Championships
| Bronze medal – third place | 2004 Amsterdam | Team |
| Bronze medal – third place | 2006 Volos | Team |

Polina Miller (Russian: Полина Миллер, born November 23, 1988 in Saint Petersburg) is a Russian gymnast. She was a member of a team which came 3rd in the 2006 European Women's Championships as well as the 2006 World Gymnastics Championships as part of the team. At the 2005 World Gymnastics Championships she was a finalist in the uneven bars final and ended up in 6th place (9.462).

== Competitive history ==
| Year | Event | Team | AA | VT | UB | BB | FX |
|---|---|---|---|---|---|---|---|
| 2004 | European Championships | 3rd | | | | | |
| 2005 | World Championships | | | | 6th | | |
| 2006 | European Championships | 3rd | | | | | |
| 2006 | World Championships | 3rd | | | | | |

| Year | Competition Description | Location | Apparatus | Rank-Final | Score-Final | Rank-Qualifying | Score-Qualifying |
|---|---|---|---|---|---|---|---|
| 2004 | European Championships | Amsterdam | Team | 3 | 110.423 | | |
| 2005 | World Championships | Melbourne | Uneven Bars | 6 | 9.462 | 5 | 9.437 |
| 2006 | European Championships | Volos | Team | 3 | 173.375 | 1 | 176.150 |
| 2006 | European Championships | Volos | Uneven Bars | | | 24 | 13.800 |
| 2006 | World Championships | Aarhus | Team | 3 | 177.325 | 4 | 234.800 |
| 2006 | World Championships | Aarhus | Uneven Bars | | | 18 | 14.875 |
| 2006 | World Championships | Aarhus | Floor Exercise | | | 79 | 13.550 |
