= Kristýna Pálešová =

Czech artistic gymnast

- Born: 22 February 1991 (age 35) Ivančice, Czech Republic
- Height: 158 cm (5 ft 2 in)

Gymnastics career
- Discipline: Women's artistic gymnastics
- Country represented: Czech Republic (2007–2014)
- Club: Sokol Brno I
- Head coach: Kateřina Janečková
Medal record
Women's artistic gymnastics
Representing Czech Republic
FIG World Cup
Event	1st	2nd	3rd
World Challenge Cup	5	1	1

Kristýna Pálešová (born 22 February 1991) is a Czech former artistic gymnast. She competed at the 2008 and 2012 Summer Olympics. She is a five-time FIG World Cup event champion.

== Gymnastics career ==
Pálešová began gymnastics at the age of five. She made her senior international debut at the 2007 European Championships.

Pálešová represented the Czech Republic at the 2008 Summer Olympics and advanced to the all-around final, finishing 21st. She tore her ACL during podium training at the 2009 World Championships and withdrew from the competition.

At the 2011 Maribor World Challenge Cup, Pálešová won the gold medal on the uneven bars. She then won the uneven bars bronze medal at the Ostrava World Challenge Cup.

Pálešová competed at the 2012 Olympic Test Event and won a berth to the 2012 Summer Olympics. During podium training at the 2012 European Championships, she injured her foot on the balance beam and had four stitches. She was still able to compete at the Olympic Games and finished 47th in the all-around qualification. After the Olympic Games, she competed at the Ostrava World Challenge Cup and won gold medals on both the uneven bars and the balance beam.

At the 2013 Cottbus World Cup, Pálešová injured both of her elbows while competing on the uneven bars after missing a Jaeger. The injury was diagnosed as a bruised joint capsule, and she was able to return to training in time for the 2013 European Championships. She won the uneven bars gold medal at the Ljubljana World Challenge Cup. She then won the uneven bars silver medal at the Osijek World Challenge Cup, behind Ekaterina Kramarenko.

Pálešová won the uneven bars title at the 2014 Doha World Challenge Cup. She also won the uneven bars gold medal at the Korea Cup. She retired in June 2016.
