= Marie-Sophie Hindermann =

German artistic gymnast

- Born: 26 May 1991 (age 35) Tübingen, Germany
- Height: 1.75 m (5 ft 9 in)

Gymnastics career
- Discipline: Women's artistic gymnastics
- Country represented: Germany (2005–2012 (GER))
- Club: TSG Tübingen

Marie-Sophie Hindermann (born 26 May 1991) is a German former artistic gymnast.

== Career ==
Hindermann won four medals at the 2006 European Women's Artistic Gymnastics Championships in the junior category: a silver on vault and bronzes in team, all-around, and uneven bars.

At the 2007 World Artistic Gymnastics Championships, she finished 14th in the all-around and 5th on uneven bars.

At the 2008 European Women's Artistic Gymnastics Championships, Hindermann helped the German team finish 7th. She competed at the 2008 Summer Olympics in all artistic gymnastics events except for vault. In qualifications, she helped the German team finish in 12th place. Her best individual result was 55th place in the all-around.

At 5 feet 7 inches tall in 2008, Hindermann is one of the tallest female gymnasts to ever compete in the Olympic Games. Being unusually tall for a female gymnast, she required adjustments of the uneven bars during her career that caused delays at international competitions.

She retired from competitive gymnastics in December 2012.
