= Cassy Vericel =

French artistic gymnast

- Born: 10 January 1991 (age 35) Lyon, France

Gymnastics career
- Discipline: Women's artistic gymnastics
- Country represented: France
- Head coaches: Huanzong Cai and Xiaolin Ning
- Retired: 2008
Medal record
Representing France
World Championships
Bronze medal – third place	2007 Stuttgart	Floor
European Championships
Bronze medal – third place	2008 Clermont-Ferrand	Team

Cassy Vericel (born 10 January 1991 in Lyon) is a French former artistic gymnast. She won the bronze medal on floor exercise at the 2007 World Championships. Vericel was selected to participate at the 2008 Summer Olympics but pulled out due to an ankle injury.
