= Vanessa Ferrari =

Italian artistic gymnast (born 1990)

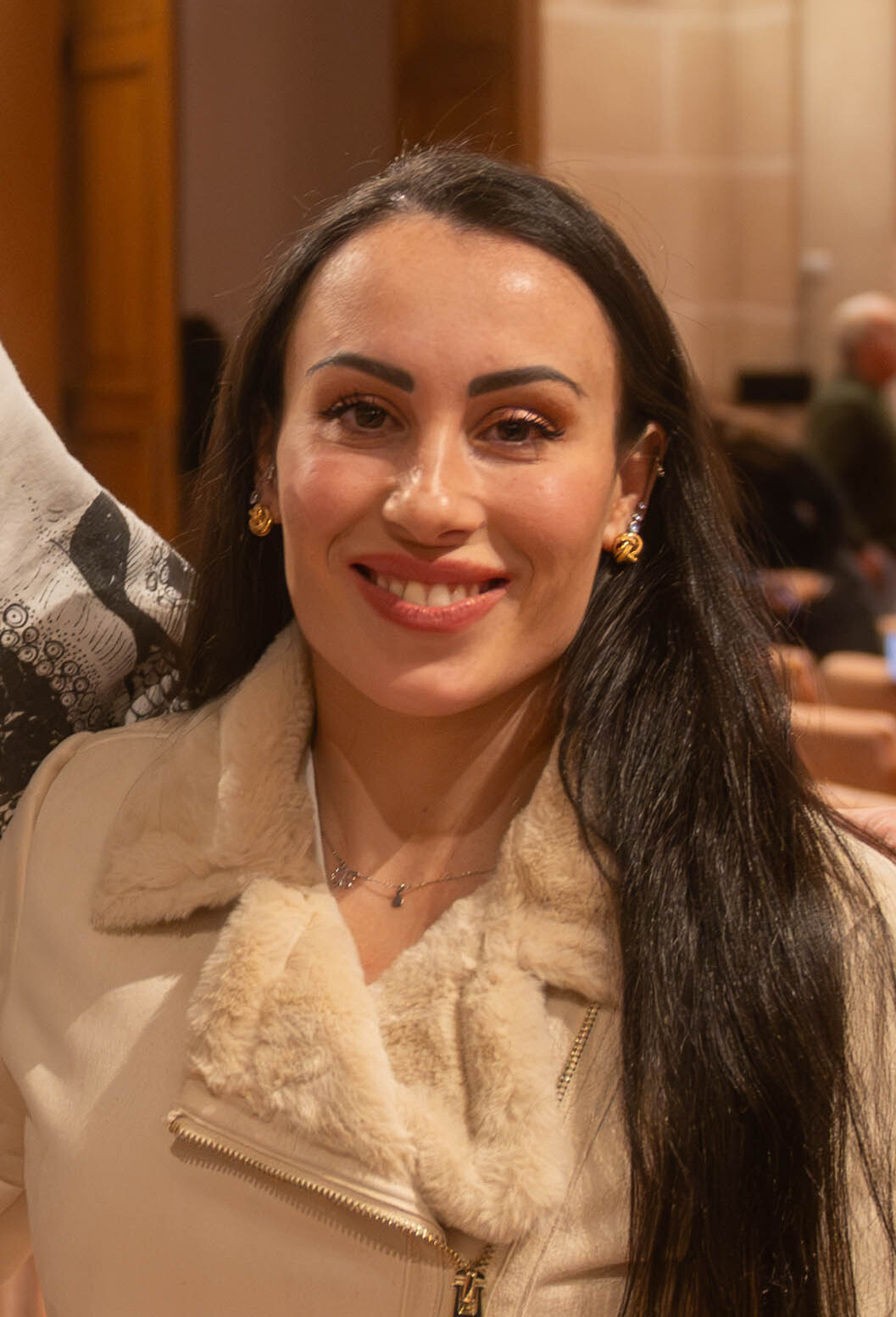
- Ferrari in 2024

Personal information
- Nicknames: The Butterfly; The Cannibal; The Lioness
- Born: 10 November 1990 (age 35) Orzinuovi, Brescia
- Height: 146 cm (4 ft 9 in)

Gymnastics career
- Discipline: Women's artistic gymnastics
- Country represented: Italy; (2002–2024)
- Club: Brixia Brescia; Centro Sportivo Esercito
- Gym: Brixia Brescia
- Head coach: Enrico Casella
- Eponymous skills: Ferrari (FX)
- Retired: October 9, 2024
Medal record
Representing Italy
Event	1st	2nd	3rd
Olympic Games	0	1	0
World Championships	1	1	3
European Championships	4	2	2
Mediterranean Games	8	1	1
European Youth Olympic Festival	2	1	2
Total	15	6	8
Olympic Games
Silver medal – second place	2020 Tokyo	Floor Exercise
World Championships
Gold medal – first place	2006 Aarhus	All-Around
Silver medal – second place	2013 Antwerp	Floor Exercise
Bronze medal – third place	2006 Aarhus	Uneven Bars
Bronze medal – third place	2006 Aarhus	Floor Exercise
Bronze medal – third place	2007 Stuttgart	All-Around
European Championships
Gold medal – first place	2006 Volos	Team
Gold medal – first place	2007 Amsterdam	All-Around
Gold medal – first place	2007 Amsterdam	Floor Exercise
Gold medal – first place	2014 Sofia	Floor Exercise
Silver medal – second place	2006 Volos	Floor Exercise
Silver medal – second place	2009 Milan	Floor Exercise
Bronze medal – third place	2012 Brussels	Team
Bronze medal – third place	2021 Basel	Floor Exercise
Mediterranean Games
Gold medal – first place	2005 Almería	Team
Gold medal – first place	2005 Almería	All-Around
Gold medal – first place	2005 Almería	Vault
Gold medal – first place	2005 Almería	Balance Beam
Gold medal – first place	2005 Almería	Floor Exercise
Gold medal – first place	2013 Mersin	Team
Gold medal – first place	2013 Mersin	All-Around
Gold medal – first place	2013 Mersin	Floor Exercise
Silver medal – second place	2005 Almería	Uneven Bars
Bronze medal – third place	2013 Mersin	Balance Beam
FIG World Cup
Event	1st	2nd	3rd
All-Around World Cup	1	0	2
Apparatus World Cup	2	2	2
World Challenge Cup	3	0	1
Total	6	2	5

Vanessa Ferrari (born 10 November 1990) is a retired Italian artistic gymnast. She was the 2006 World All-Around Champion and competed for Italy at the 2008, 2012, 2016, and 2020 Summer Olympics, winning a silver medal on floor exercise in 2020. In doing so, Ferrari became the first Italian to win an individual Olympic medal in Women's Artistic Gymnastics, and the first medallist for the Italian women's team since the 1928 Summer Olympics. She is a five-time World medallist and eight-time European medallist, and is currently the most decorated Italian gymnast of all time.

== Personal life ==
Vanessa Ferrari was born on 10 November 1990 in Orzinuovi, Brescia. Her mother, Galya Nikolova, is Bulgarian, and her father, Giovanni, is Italian. In 2006, she received the Golden Collar for sporting merit from the Italian National Olympic Committee.

== Junior career ==
=== 2004–2005 ===
Ferrari first rose to prominence as a 13-year-old at the 2004 Junior European Championships where she won the silver medal in the all-around competition with a score of 36.525 behind Steliana Nistor of Romania. She also won two bronze medals with the Italian team and on the balance beam with a score of 9.175.

Still in the junior ranks for 2005, Ferrari turned in more fine performances at the European Youth Olympics in Italy and the 2005 Mediterranean Games in Almería, Spain, winning the all around gold medal at both competitions as well. She also won vault, beam and floor at the latter as well as the silver medal on the uneven bars.

== Senior career ==
=== 2006–2008 ===
In April, Ferrari competed at the 2006 European Championships in Volos, Greece. She led the Italian team to win gold with an all-around score of 60.750. In event finals, she placed seventh on uneven bars, scoring 14.300, seventh on balance beam, scoring 14.875, and second on floor, scoring 15.450.

In October, Ferrari competed at the 2006 World Championships in Aarhus, Denmark. She won the all-around final with a score of 61.025. In event finals, she placed third on uneven bars, scoring 15.775, sixth on balance beam, scoring 14.675, and third on floor, scoring 15.450.

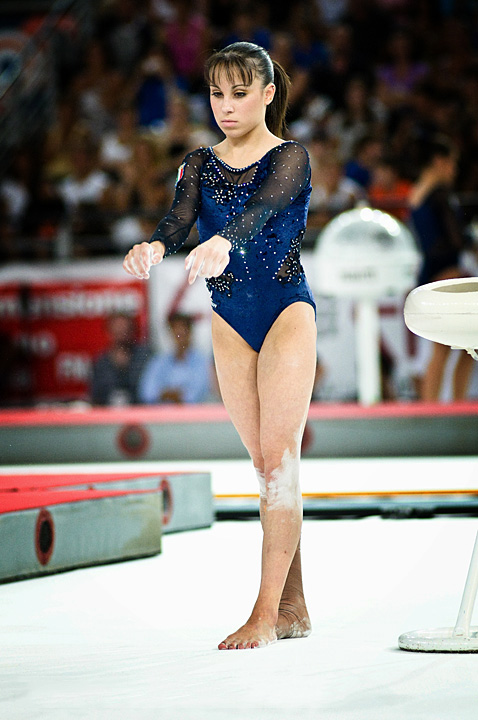
Ferrari at the 2008 Mediterraneo Gym Cup

In April 2007, Ferrari competed at the European Championships in Amsterdam, Netherlands. She won the all-around final with a score of 61.075. In event finals, she placed sixth on uneven bars, scoring 14.375, eighth on balance beam, scoring 13.550, and first on floor, scoring 15.400. In September she competed at the 2007 World Championships in Stuttgart, Germany. She contributed scores of 15.100 on vault and 14.775 on uneven bars toward the Italian team's fourth-place finish. Individually, she won the bronze medal in the all-around final with a score of 60.550. In event finals, she placed eighth on uneven bars, scoring 14.700 and sixth on floor, scoring 15.050.

Ferrari competed at the 2008 European Championships in Clermont-Ferrand, France. She contributed an all-around score of 59.400 toward the Italian team's fourth-place finish.

==== Beijing Olympics ====
In August, Ferrari competed at the 2008 Summer Olympics in Beijing, China. In qualifications, she contributed an all-around score of 58.300 to the Italian team's tenth-place finish. Individually, she qualified for the all-around final in twenty-first place. In the all around final, she placed eleventh with a score of 59.450.

=== 2009–2011 ===
In April 2009, Ferrari competed at the European Championships in Milan, Italy. She placed ninth in the all-around final with a score of 55.175 and second in the floor final with a score of 14.675. In June Ferrari underwent a bursectomy to remove excess fluid from behind her Achilles tendon and would likely miss the 2009 World Championships.

Towards the end of April 2010, Ferrari competed at the European Championships in Birmingham, United Kingdom. She contributed an all-around score of 55.525 toward the Italian team's fifth-place finish. In event finals, she placed seventh on uneven bars, scoring 14.150 and fourth on floor, scoring 13.850.

Ferrari performing on floor at the 2011 World Cup in Paris, France.

In October 2010, Ferrari competed at the World Championships in Rotterdam, The Netherlands. She contributed scores of 13.966 on vault, 14.066 on uneven bars, and 14.333 on floor toward the Italian team's eighth-place finish. Individually, she placed eleventh in the all-around final with a score of 56.165 and sixth in the floor final with a score of 14.600.

In April 2011, Ferrari competed at the European Championships in Berlin, Germany. She placed sixth in the all-around final with a score of 55.475 and eighth in the uneven bars final with a score of 12.850.

In October 2011, Ferrari competed at the World Championships in Tokyo, Japan. She contributed an all-around score of 56.198 toward the Italian team's ninth-place finish. Individually, she placed twelfth in the all-around final with a score of 55.532. She also qualified in sixth place with a score of 14.466 in the floor final but was injured and could not compete.

=== 2012 ===
In January, Ferrari competed at the London Prepares series in London, United Kingdom. She contributed an all around score of 56.532 toward the Italian team's first-place finish, which meant that they would qualify a full team to the Olympics. In event finals, she placed fourth on floor scoring 14.400.

In May, Ferrari competed at the European Championships in Brussels, Belgium. She contributed scores of 14.266 on vault, 14.466 on uneven bars, and 14.400 on floor toward the Italian team's third-place finish. In event finals, she placed first on floor, scoring 14.400.

==== London Olympics ====
At the end of July, Ferrari competed at the 2012 Summer Olympics in London, United Kingdom with Erika Fasana, Giorgia Campana, Elisabetta Preziosa and Carlotta Ferlito. In qualifications, she qualified to the all-around final in seventh place with a score of 57.932 and the floor final in third place with a score of 14.900. In the team final, she contributed an all-around score of 56.865 toward the Italian team's seventh-place finish. In the all around final, Ferrari placed eighth with a score of 57.999. In the floor final, she tied for third place with Aliya Mustafina. Both gymnasts scored 14.900, but Mustafina was awarded the bronze medal after tie-breaking procedures prioritised execution score.

=== 2013–2015 ===
In June 2013 Ferrari, with Elisabetta Preziosa, Giulia Leni, Giorgia Campana and Chiara Gandolfi, competed at the 2013 Mediterranean Games in Mersin. She contributed toward the Italian team's first-place finish; in event finals, she placed first on all-around scoring 56.132, first on floor scoring 13.900 and third on balance beam scoring 14.166. Ferrari is the most decorated Italian athlete at the Mediterranean Games with eight gold medals.

At the 2013 World Artistic Gymnastics Championships, Ferrari finished sixth in the all-around and fourth on balance beam. On floor exercise, she scored 14.633 to win the silver medal. She used an instrumental version of Caro Emerald's Tangled Up as her floor exercise music.

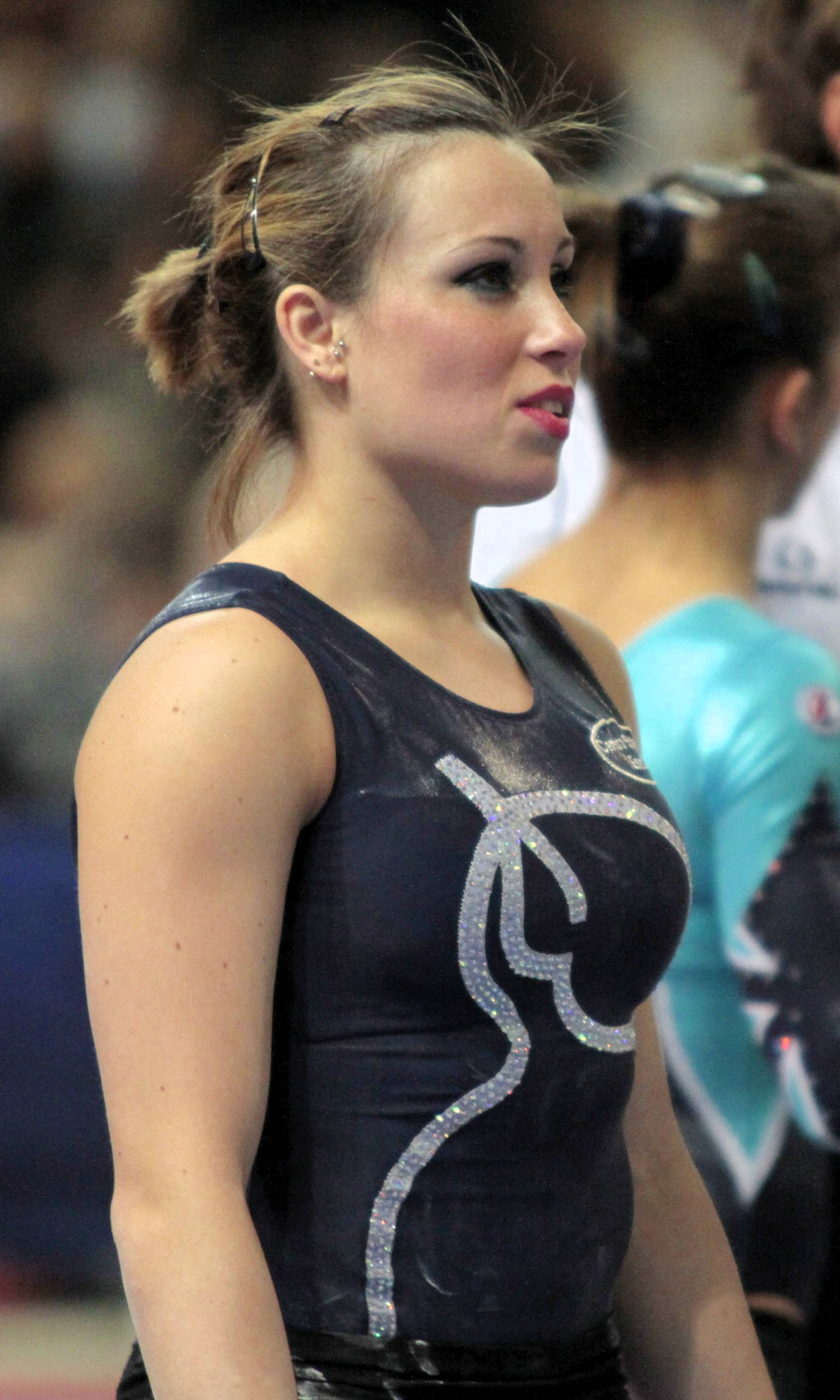
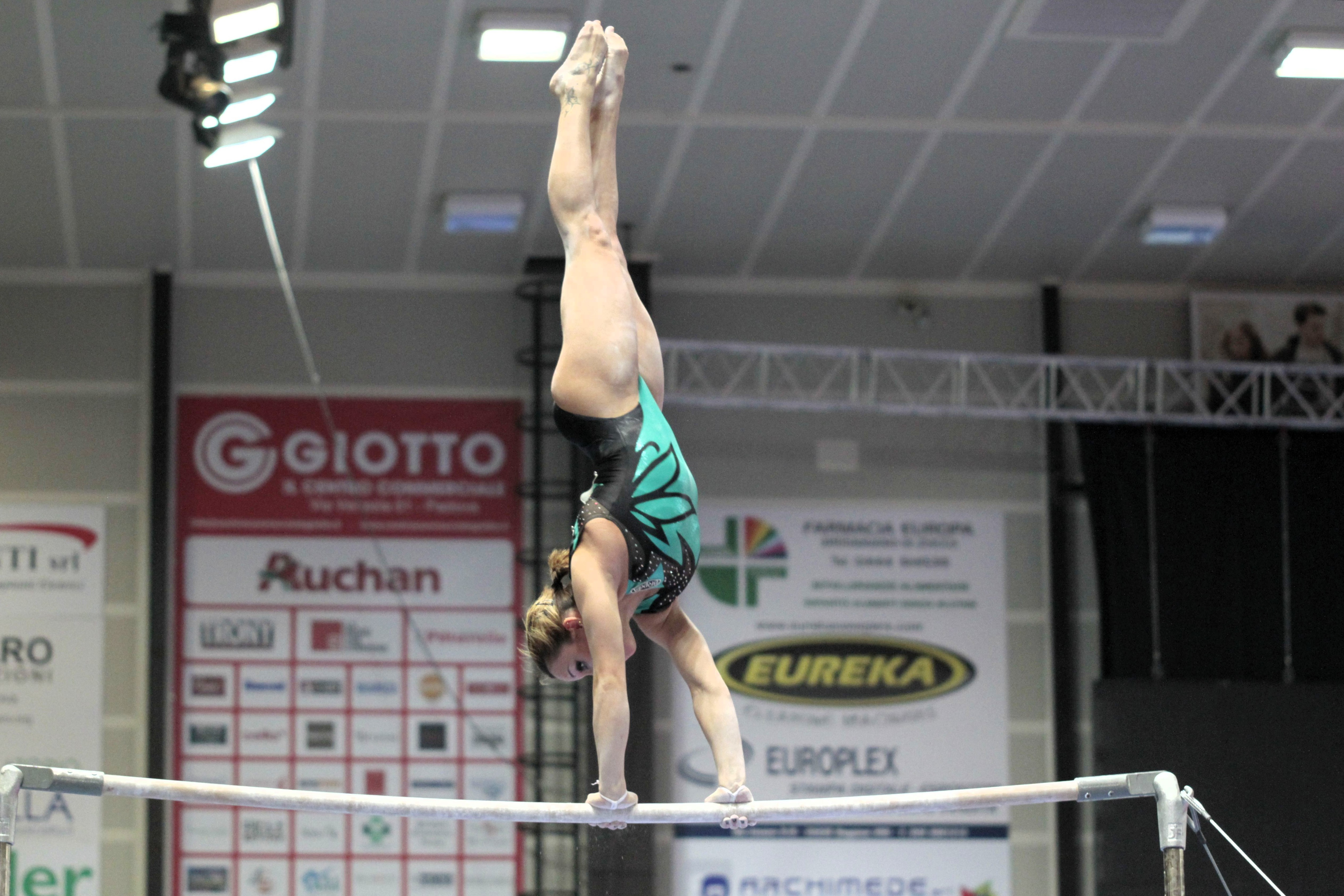
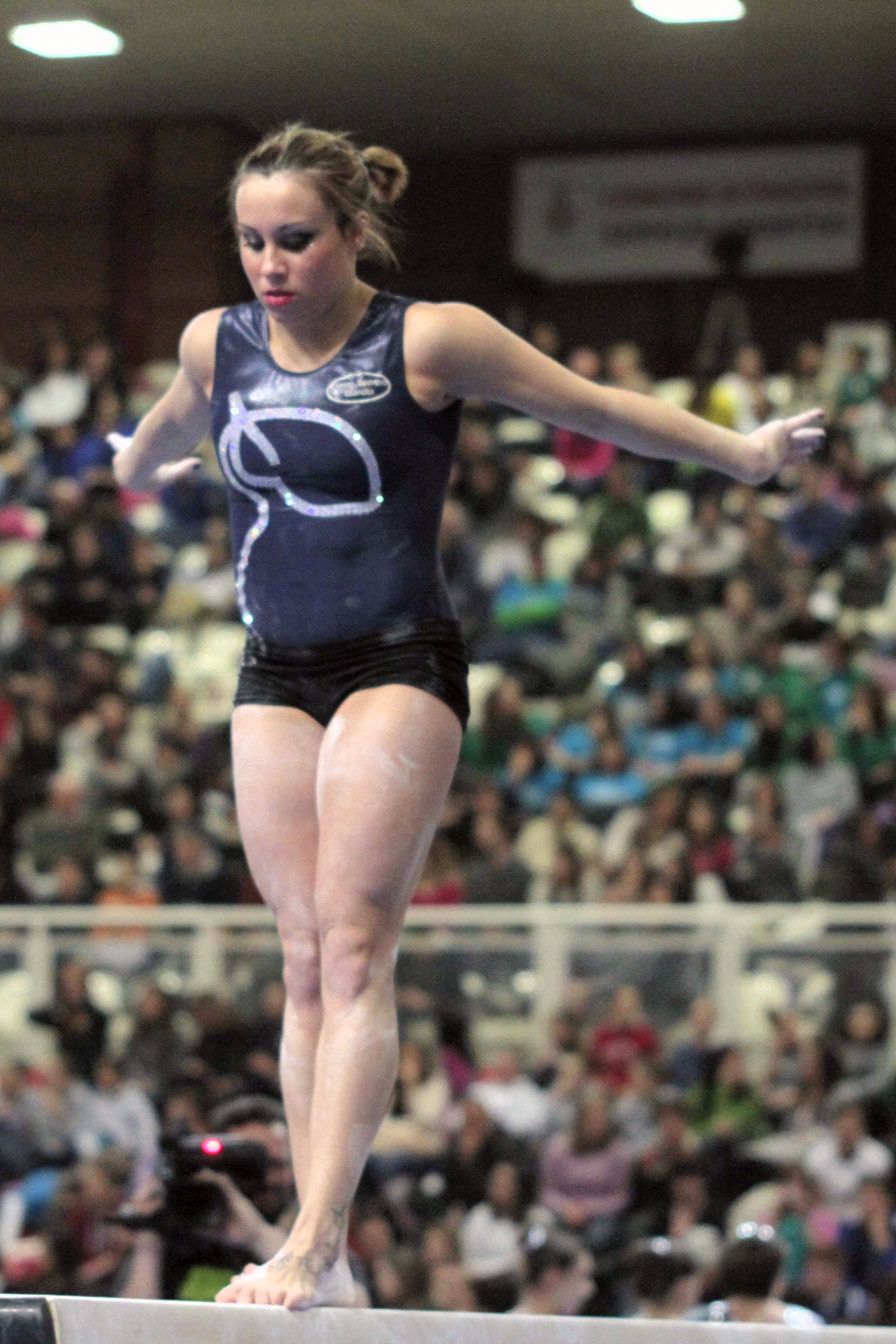
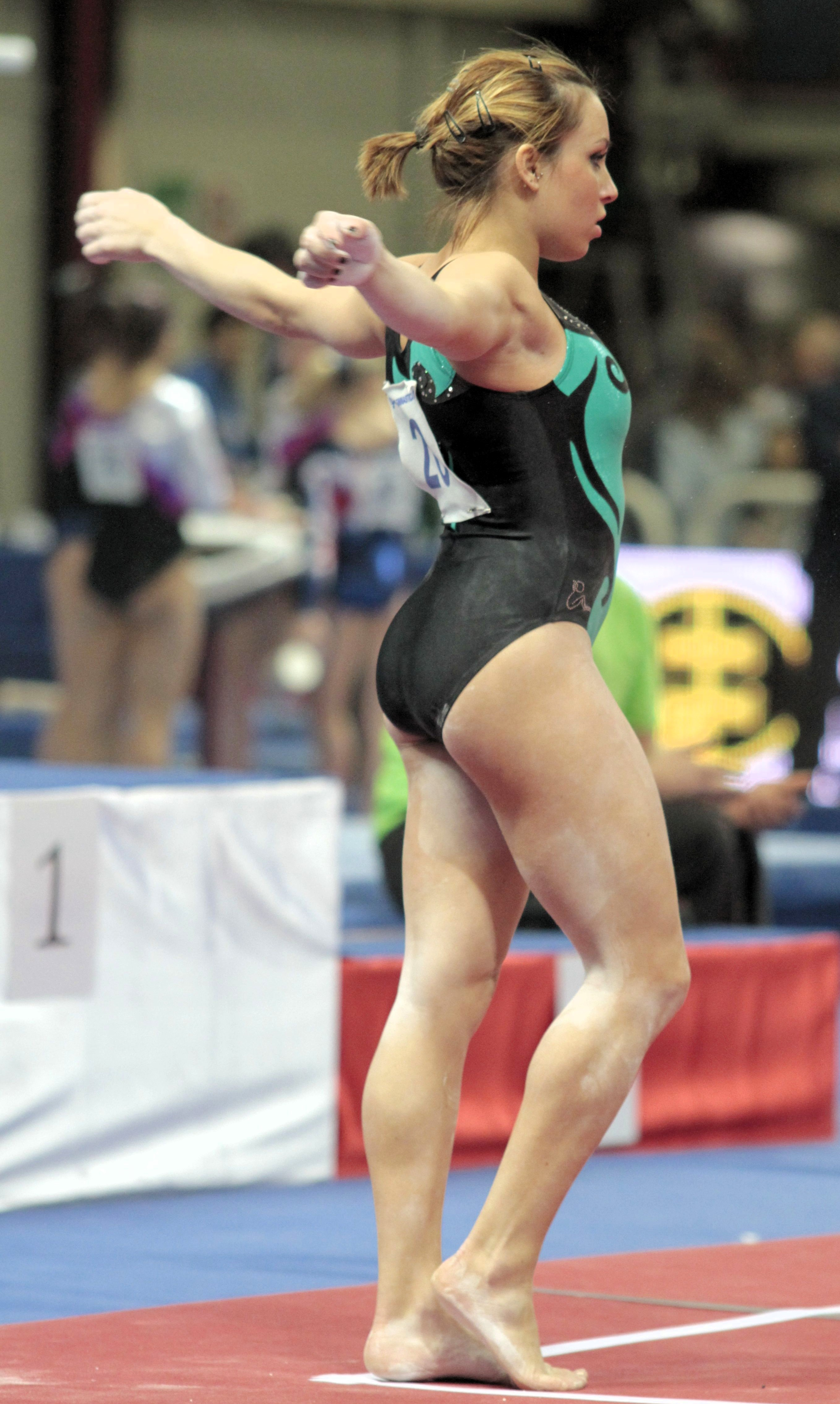
Ferrari in 2013

Ferrari began 2014 competing at the first Italian Serie A where she helped Brixia win the team gold. In March she competed at the American Cup where she finished in fifth place. In April she competed at the Tokyo World Cup where she finished in first place. At the European Championships in May, Ferrari won the gold medal on floor exercise. At the 2014 World Championships in Nanning, China, Ferrari helped Italy finish fifth in the team final. Individually, Ferrari finished sixth in the all-around and fifth on floor exercise. After the World Championships, Ferrari continued competing at the World Cup circuit. She next competed at the Stuttgart World Cup where she finished fourth despite having the flu. She finished the year off at the Glasgow World Cup, where she finished sixth.

In 2015, Ferrari competed in the first two Italian Serie A competitions. In March, she competed at the 2015 AT&T American Cup where she finished sixth. In April, she competed at the 2015 European Championships where she qualified to the all-around final in tenth place. However, she opted to withdraw from the final and allow teammate Martina Rizzelli to compete, due to the fact that she was still overcoming mononucleosis. In October, Ferrari competed at the Novara Cup, where Italy finished second in the team final, and Ferrari finished eleventh in the all-around. Later that month Ferrari competed at the 2015 World Championships. She helped Italy qualify to the team finals, and individually she qualified to the all-around final but withdrew, which allowed teammate Tea Ugrin to compete.

=== 2016 ===
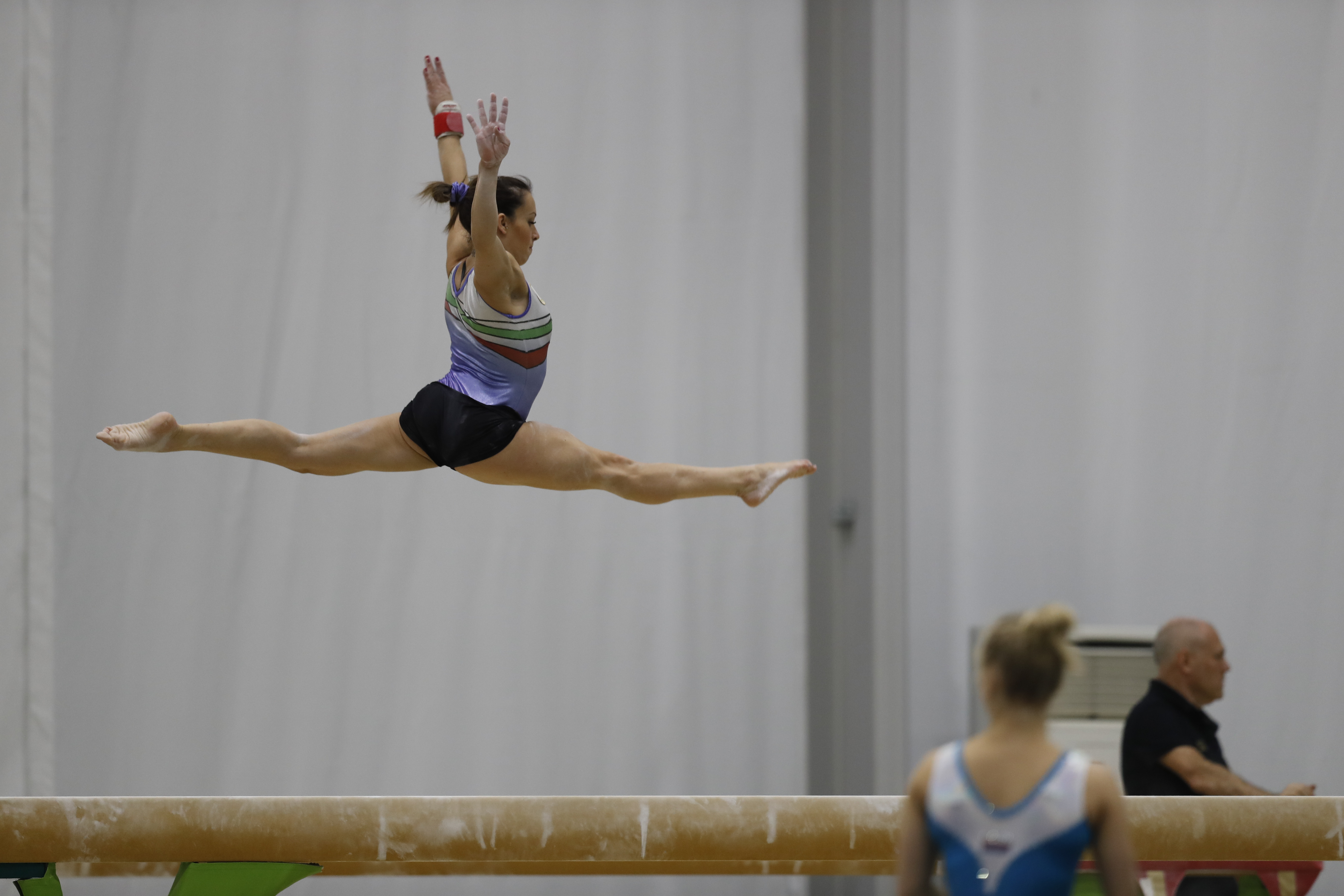
Ferrari in 2016

At the 2016 Olympic Games in Rio de Janeiro, Ferrari qualified for the individual all-around and floor finals. She finished in sixteenth place in the all-around final and fourth in the floor final, just missing the podium in the latter, as she had at the 2012 Olympics.

In September, she had surgery on her Achilles' tendons, but said she plans to continue training for more competition after a six-month rehabilitation.

=== 2017–2018 ===
Ferrari spent the majority of 2017 recovering from tendon pain. She competed at the final Italian Serie A in September where she scored second highest on floor for the senior field and was named to the team to compete at the 2017 World Championships in Montreal. During qualifications Ferrari finished 25th on beam but qualified to the floor exercise final in seventh place. During the final, Ferrari tore her Achilles tendon while performing a whip to full twisting double back. Ferrari was one of many gymnasts who were injured while warming up or competing at the 2017 World Championships, following Rebeca Andrade of Brazil, Larisa Iordache of Romania, Ragan Smith of the United States, and Kohei Uchimura of Japan.

Ferrari spent 2018 recovering from her injury sustained at the 2017 World Championships. She announced that she would try to qualify for the 2020 Olympics through the apparatus world cup circuit.

=== 2019–2020 ===
Ferrari returned to competition in February 2019 at the Melbourne World Cup. She only competed on balance beam and floor exercise; she qualified for the floor final in first place. She later won gold on floor exercise, finishing over a point ahead of second-place finisher Paula Mejias of Puerto Rico. At the Baku World Cup Ferrari qualified to the floor exercise final in third place, behind compatriot Lara Mori and American Jade Carey. In the final she once again finished third behind Carey and Mori. Directly after the Baku World Cup, Ferrari travelled to Doha for the Doha World Cup where she qualified to the floor exercise final in seventh place. In finals she once again won bronze behind Carey and Mori.

In late January, Ferrari was listed on a nominative roster that was released for the 2020 Melbourne World Cup, taking place on February 20–22. She qualified in second place to the floor exercise event finals behind Jade Carey. During event finals she once again placed second behind Carey. In March she competed at the Baku World Cup and finished second on floor exercise behind Lara Mori during qualifications and advanced to the event final. However event finals were cancelled due to the 2020 coronavirus outbreak in Azerbaijan.

=== 2021 ===
Ferrari made her return to the all-around at the 3rd Italian Serie A of 2021, over four years after her last all-around performance at the 2016 Olympic Games. She placed first in the all-around and helped Brixia place first as a team. In April Ferrari was selected to represent Italy at the European Championships in Basel alongside Alice D'Amato, Martina Maggio, and Giorgia Villa. During qualifications she finished seventh in the all-around and fourth on floor exercise, qualifying to both finals. Ferrari later withdrew from the all-around final as a precaution. On the last day of event finals she won the bronze medal on floor exercise, behind Jessica Gadirova of Great Britain and Angelina Melnikova of Russia, performing the exercise on the notes of "Bella ciao" and dedicating the medal to the Liberation Day of Italy. This medal came 7 years after her last medal in European Championships, and 15 years after her first one.

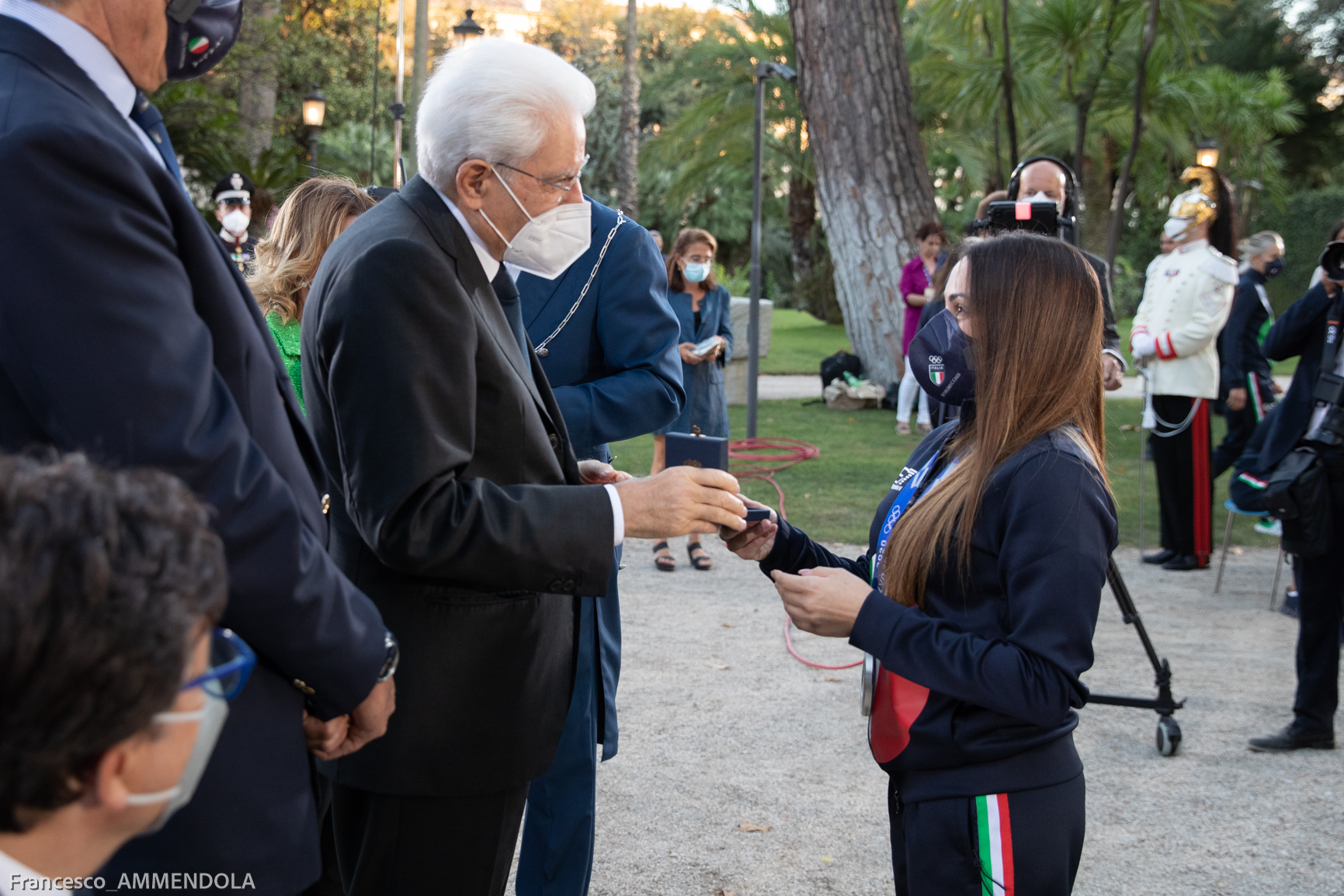
Ferrari awarded by Sergio Mattarella at Quirinale in 2021.

Ferrari competed at the Doha World Cup, where she placed first on floor exercise. As a result, she earned her nominative berth to compete at the 2020 Summer Olympics, her fourth Olympic Games. Weeks before the start of the Games, Giorgia Villa was injured and Ferrari was chosen to replace her on the four-person Italian team.

Ferrari represented Italy at the 2020 Summer Olympics in Tokyo, Japan alongside Asia D'Amato, Alice D'Amato, and Martina Maggio. The four qualified for the team finals and placed fourth with a total score of 163.638. Ferrari herself qualified in first place for the floor exercise final with a score of 14,166. She placed second in the final behind gold medallist Jade Carey of the United States and ahead of bronze medallists Mai Murakami of Japan and Angelina Melnikova of Russia (under the Russian Olympic Committee) with a score of 14,200.

In competing at her fourth Olympic Games, Ferrari became the fourth female artistic gymnast to become a four-time Olympian following four-time Olympian Olga Tass (1948–1960), eight-time Olympian Oksana Chusovitina (1992–2020), and five-time Olympian Daniele Hypólito (2000–2016).

=== 2024 ===
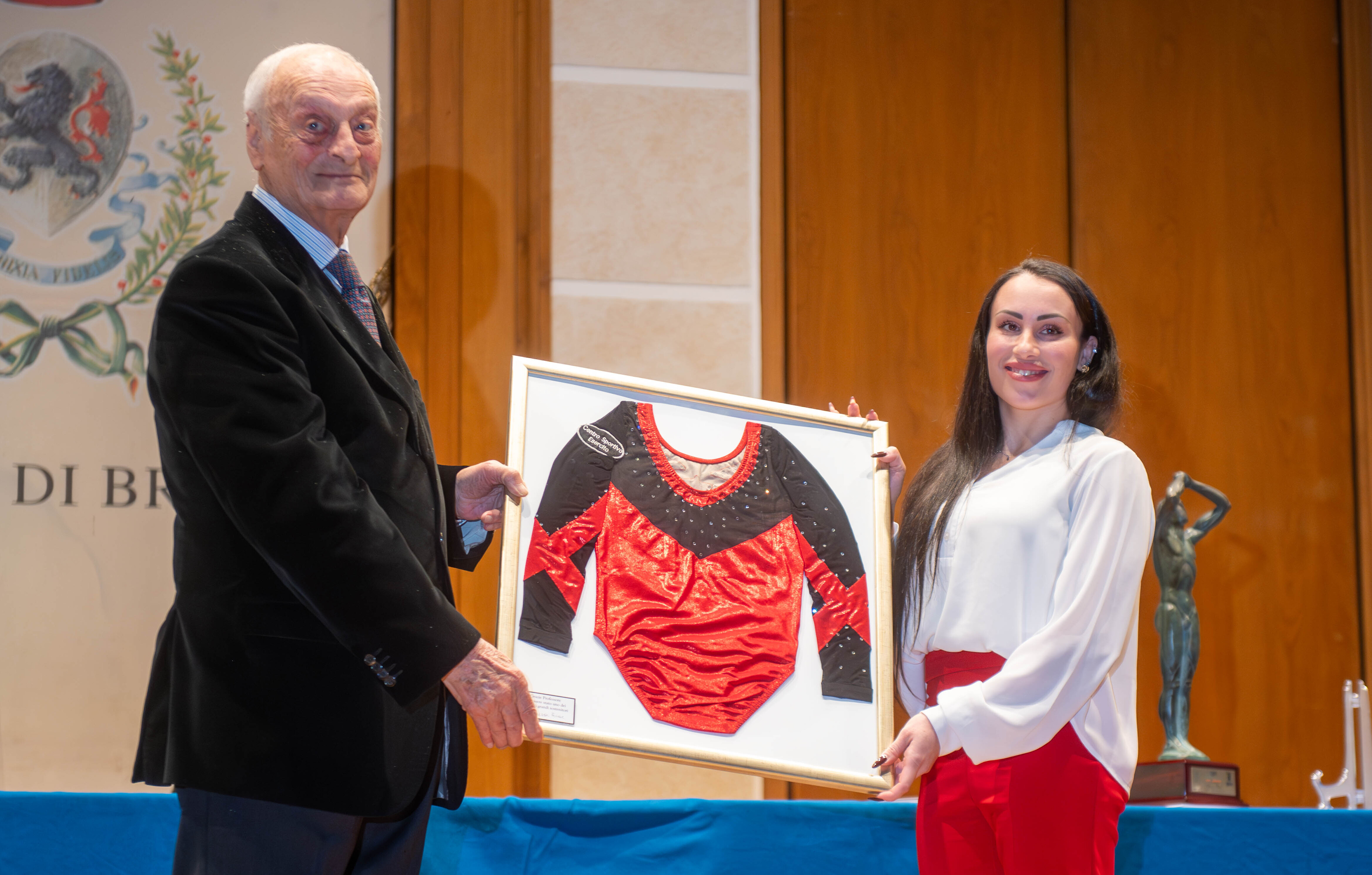
Ferrari receiving the Oscar of Brescia Sport Lifetime Achievement Award

Ferrari intended to return to competition in 2024 with the hopes of making her fifth Olympic team. However, she suffered a calf injury in the lead-up to the Italian national championships. On 9 October 2024, Ferrari announced her retirement from the sport. In December she was awarded the Lifetime Achievement Award from the Oscar of Brescia Sport.

Ferrari was inducted into the International Gymnastics Hall of Fame in 2026.

== Eponymous skill ==
Ferrari has one eponymous skill listed in the Code of Points.

Apparatus	Name	Description	Difficulty (Note: Valid for the 2025–2028 Code of Points)	Added to the Code
Floor exercise	Ferrari	Tour jeté to ring position with additional 1/2 turn (180°)	D (0.4)	2012 Olympic Games

== Competitive history ==
Competitive history of Vanessa Ferrari
Year	Event	Team	AA	VT	UB	BB	FX
2004
2004	Junior European Championships	3rd place, bronze medalist(s)	2nd place, silver medalist(s)		6	3rd place, bronze medalist(s)	
2005	European Youth Olympics Festival	3rd place, bronze medalist(s)	1st place, gold medalist(s)	2nd place, silver medalist(s)	3rd place, bronze medalist(s)	4	1st place, gold medalist(s)
2005	Mediterranean Games	1st place, gold medalist(s)	1st place, gold medalist(s)	1st place, gold medalist(s)	2nd place, silver medalist(s)	1st place, gold medalist(s)	1st place, gold medalist(s)
2006
2006	European Championships	1st place, gold medalist(s)			7	7	2nd place, silver medalist(s)
2006	World Championships		1st place, gold medalist(s)		3rd place, bronze medalist(s)	6	3rd place, bronze medalist(s)
2006	Arthur Gander Memorial		1st place, gold medalist(s)				
2007	Paris World Cup				1st place, gold medalist(s)	1st place, gold medalist(s)	1st place, gold medalist(s)
2007	European Championships		1st place, gold medalist(s)		6	8	1st place, gold medalist(s)
2007	World Championships	4	3rd place, bronze medalist(s)		8		6
2008
2008	European Championships	4				5	
2008	Olympic Games		11				
2009
2009	European Championships		9				2nd place, silver medalist(s)
2010
2010	European Championships	5			7		4
2010	World Championships	8	11				6
2010	Arthur Gander Memorial		3rd place, bronze medalist(s)				
2010	Swiss Cup	2nd place, silver medalist(s)					
2011	Paris World Cup						4
2011	European Championships		6		8		
2011	World Championships		12				WD
2012	Olympic Test Event	1st place, gold medalist(s)					1st place, gold medalist(s)
2012	Italian National Championships		1st place, gold medalist(s)		2nd place, silver medalist(s)	2nd place, silver medalist(s)	1st place, gold medalist(s)
2012	European Championships	3rd place, bronze medalist(s)					4
2012	Romanian International Friendly	2nd place, silver medalist(s)	3rd place, bronze medalist(s)				
2012	Olympic Games	7	8				4
2012	Stuttgart World Cup		5				
2012	Glasgow World Cup		4				
2013	American Cup		5				
2013	La Roche-sur-Yon World Cup					2nd place, silver medalist(s)	
2013	City of Jesolo Trophy	2nd place, silver medalist(s)					
2013	Mediterranean Games	1st place, gold medalist(s)	1st place, gold medalist(s)			3rd place, bronze medalist(s)	1st place, gold medalist(s)
2013	Germany-Italy Friendly Meet	1st place, gold medalist(s)	1st place, gold medalist(s)				
2013	World Championships		6			4	2nd place, silver medalist(s)
2013	Stuttgart World Cup		3rd place, bronze medalist(s)				
2013	Glasgow World Cup		3rd place, bronze medalist(s)				
2014	American Cup		5				
2014	Tokyo World Cup		1st place, gold medalist(s)				
2014	European Championships	5				5	1st place, gold medalist(s)
2014	Novara Cup	1st place, gold medalist(s)					
2014	Golden League	1st place, gold medalist(s)	1st place, gold medalist(s)	3rd place, bronze medalist(s)	2nd place, silver medalist(s)	2nd place, silver medalist(s)	
2014	World Championships	5	6				5
2014	Stuttgart World Cup		4				
2014	Glasgow World Cup		6				
2015	American Cup		6				
2015	European Championships		WD				
2015	Novara Cup	2nd place, silver medalist(s)	11				
2015	World Championships	7	WD				
2016	4th Italian Serie A	1st place, gold medalist(s)					
2016	Anadia World Challenge Cup					5	3rd place, bronze medalist(s)
2016	Italian Championships		1st place, gold medalist(s)		2nd place, silver medalist(s)	4	
2016	Olympic Games		16				4
2017	4th Italian Serie A					3rd place, bronze medalist(s)	2nd place, silver medalist(s)
2017	World Championships						8
2019	Melbourne World Cup						1st place, gold medalist(s)
2019	Baku World Cup						3rd place, bronze medalist(s)
2019	Doha World Cup						3rd place, bronze medalist(s)
2020	Melbourne World Cup						2nd place, silver medalist(s)
2020	Baku World Cup						2nd place, silver medalist(s)
2021	1st Italian Serie A	1st place, gold medalist(s)					
2021	3rd Italian Serie A	1st place, gold medalist(s)	1st place, gold medalist(s)				
2021	European Championships		WD				3rd place, bronze medalist(s)
2021	Doha World Cup						1st place, gold medalist(s)
2021	Olympic Games	4					2nd place, silver medalist(s)

== Floor music ==
Year	Music Title
2006–2009; 2016	Nessun dorma
2010	Así se baila el tango
2011–2012	Triangle Tango
2012	Angel and Devil
2013–2014	Tangled Up
2021	Con te partirò

Awards
Preceded by Valentina Vezzali	Italian Sportswoman of the Year; 2006	Succeeded by Valentina Vezzali
