= Karina Myasnikova =

Russian artistic gymnast

- Born: September 2, 1991 (age 35) Korolyov, Moscow Oblast RSFSR, USSR

Gymnastics career
- Discipline: Women's artistic gymnastics
- Country represented: Russia
Medal record
Representing Russia
Women's artistic Gymnastics
European Championships
Silver medal – second place	2008 Clermont	Team

Karina Myasnikova (born 2 September 1991 in Russia) is a Russian artistic gymnast.

== Career ==
Karina Myasnikova won a silver in senior team at the 2008 European Women's Artistic Gymnastics Championships.
