= Gymnastics at the 2008 Summer Olympics – Women's artistic individual all-around =

Women's artistic individual all-around at the Games of the XXIX Olympiad
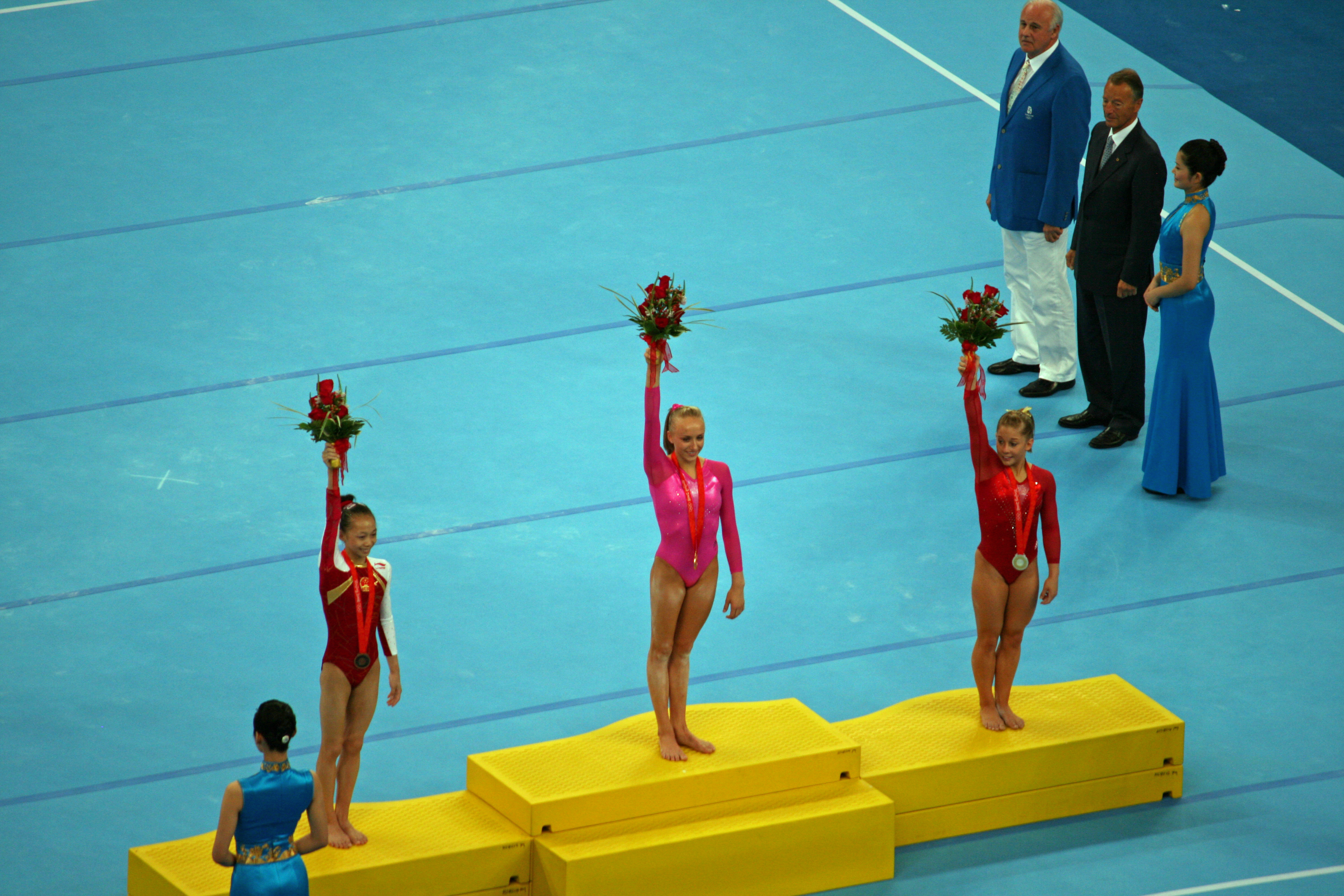
- Medal ceremony
- Venue: Beijing National Indoor Stadium
- Date: 15 August 2008
- Competitors: 24 from 14 nations

Medalists
1st place, gold medalist(s)		Nastia Liukin	United States
2nd place, silver medalist(s)		Shawn Johnson	United States
3rd place, bronze medalist(s)		Yang Yilin	China

Women's artistic individual all-around competition at the 2008 Summer Olympics was held on August 15. at the Beijing National Indoor Stadium.

For each competitor in the women's qualification, the scores for all four apparatus were summed to give an all-around qualification score. The top 24 competitors moved on to the individual all-around final, though nations were limited to two competitors each even if more qualified. In the individual all-around final, each gymnast competed on each apparatus again. Only scores from the final were used to determine final rankings.

== Final round results ==
Position	Gymnast	Country	Vault	Uneven Bars	Balance Beam	Floor	Total
1st place, gold medalist(s)	Nastia Liukin	United States	15.025 (7)	16.650 (2)	16.125 (1)	15.525 (1)	63.325
2nd place, silver medalist(s)	Shawn Johnson	United States	15.875 (1)	15.275 (10)	16.050 (2)	15.525 (1)	62.725
3rd place, bronze medalist(s)	Yang Yilin	China	15.175 (5)	16.725 (1)	15.750 (6)	15.000 (5)	62.650
4	Ksenia Semenova	Russia	14.750 (14)	16.475 (3)	15.925 (4)	14.775 (6)	61.925
5	Steliana Nistor	Romania	15.025 (7)	15.975 (4)	15.550 (8)	14.500 (10)	61.050
6	Jiang Yuyuan	China	14.825 (13)	15.875 (5)	15.425 (10)	14.775 (6)	60.900
7	Anna Pavlova	Russia	15.275 (4)	14.525 (18)	15.975 (3)	15.050 (4)	60.825
8	Sandra Izbaşa	Romania	15.075 (6)	14.300 (20)	15.875 (5)	15.500 (3)	60.750
9	Oksana Chusovitina	Germany	15.750 (2)	14.900 (14)	14.875 (16)	14.600 (8)	60.125
10	Jade Barbosa	Brazil	15.025 (7)	15.075 (12)	15.500 (9)	13.950 (20)	59.550
11	Vanessa Ferrari	Italy	14.700 (16)	15.200 (11)	15.600 (7)	13.950 (17)	59.450
12	Becky Downie	Great Britain	15.025 (7)	15.625 (6)	14.700 (17)	14.100 (16)	59.450
13	Georgia Bonora	Australia	14.850 (12)	14.625 (16)	15.100 (14)	14.375 (14)	58.950
14	Lia Parolari	Italy	13.950 (24)	15.350 (8)	15.125 (13)	14.500 (10)	58.925
15	Shona Morgan	Australia	14.650 (17)	14.625 (16)	15.100 (14)	14.425 (12)	58.800
16	Elyse Hopfner-Hibbs	Canada	14.875 (11)	15.425 (7)	14.150 (22)	13.925 (18)	58.375
17	Koko Tsurumi	Japan	14.075 (21)	14.950 (13)	15.400 (11)	13.675 (22)	58.100
18	Ariella Kaslin	Switzerland	15.350 (3)	14.275 (21)	14.425 (19)	13.950 (20)	58.000
19	Marine Petit	France	14.725 (15)	14.400 (19)	14.275 (20)	14.575 (9)	57.975
20	Kyoko Oshima	Japan	14.575 (18)	14.675 (15)	13.975 (23)	14.400 (13)	57.625
21	Kristýna Pálešová	Czech Republic	14.075 (21)	15.350 (8)	14.650 (17)	12.900 (24)	56.975
22	Ana Silva	Brazil	14.175 (20)	14.175 (23)	14.175 (21)	14.350 (15)	56.875
23	Laetitia Dugain	France	14.275 (19)	14.275 (21)	15.225 (12)	13.000 (23)	56.775
24	Gaelle Mys	Belgium	14.000 (23)	12.875 (24)	13.100 (24)	13.975 (19)	53.950

Source: The Beijing Organizing Committee for the Games of the XXIX Olympiad
