= 2008 European Women's Artistic Gymnastics Championships =

27th European Women's Artistic Gymnastics Championships
- Location: Clermont-Ferrand, France
- Dates: 3 April to 6 April 2008
- Nations: Members of the European Union of Gymnastics

The 27th European Women's Artistic Gymnastics Championships were held from 3 April to 6 April 2008 in Clermont-Ferrand.

France earned their first team medal, the bronze.

Oldest and youngest competitors

Senior	Name	Country	Date of birth	Age
Youngest	Jasmin Mader	Austria	26/12/92	15 years
Oldest	Oksana Chusovitina	Germany	19/06/75	32 years

== Country represented ==
Belgium; Bulgaria; Denmark; Germany; Finland; France; Greece; Ireland; Iceland; Israel; Italy; Croatia	Latvia; Lithuania; Luxembourg; Netherlands; Norway; Austria; Poland; Portugal; Romania; Russia; Sweden	Switzerland; Slovakia; Slovenia; Spain; Czech Republic; Turkey; Ukraine; Hungary; United Kingdom; Belarus; Cyprus

== Medal Count ==
=== Combined ===
Rank	Nation	Gold	Silver	Bronze	Total
1	Russia	4	4	1	9
2	Romania	3	3	2	8
3	France	2	2	1	5
4	Germany	1	0	0	1
5	Italy	0	1	1	2
5	Ukraine	0	1	1	2
7	Great Britain	0	1	0	1
8	Netherlands	0	0	2	2
Totals (8 entries)		10	12	8	30

=== Seniors ===
Rank	Nation	Gold	Silver	Bronze	Total
1	Romania	2	2	1	5
2	Russia	2	1	0	3
3	Germany	1	0	0	1
4	Italy	0	1	1	2
4	Ukraine	0	1	1	2
6	Great Britain	0	1	0	1
7	France	0	0	1	1
Totals (7 entries)		5	6	4	15

=== Juniors ===
Rank	Nation	Gold	Silver	Bronze	Total
1	Russia	2	3	1	6
2	France	2	2	0	4
3	Romania	1	1	1	3
4	Netherlands	0	0	2	2
Totals (4 entries)		5	6	4	15

== Medal winners ==
Event	Gold	Silver	Bronze
Seniors
Team all-around	Romania; Gabriela Drăgoi; Sandra Izbașa; Steliana Nistor; Cerasela Pătrașcu; Anamaria Tămârjan	Russia; Ksenia Afanasyeva; Svetlana Klyukina; Karina Myasnikova; Anna Pavlova; Ksenia Semenova	France; Laëtitia Dugain; Pauline Morel; Marine Petit; Isabelle Severino; Cassy Véricel
Vault	(Germany) Oksana Chusovitina	(Italy) Carlotta Giovannini	(Italy) Francesca Benolli
Uneven bars	(Russia) Ksenia Semenova	(Romania) Steliana Nistor	(Ukraine) Dariya Zgoba
Balance beam	(Russia) Ksenia Semenova	(Romania) Sandra Izbașa (Ukraine) Alina Kozich	
Floor	(Romania) Sandra Izbașa	(United Kingdom) Beth Tweddle	(Romania) Anamaria Tămârjan
Juniors
Team all-around	Russia; Anna Dementyeva; Aliya Mustafina; Tatiana Nabieva; Anastasia Novikova; Tatiana Solovyeva	France; Marine Brevet; Youna Dufournet; Marie Gaffino; Lea Kemayou; Chloé Stanic	Netherlands; Natasja Blind; Wyomi Masela; Yvette Moshage; Naoual Ouazzani-Chadi; Céline van Gerner
Vault	(France) Youna Dufournet	(Russia) Tatiana Nabieva	(Russia) Anastasia Novikova
Uneven bars	(France) Youna Dufournet	(Russia) Tatiana Nabieva	(Netherlands) Natasja Blind
Balance beam	(Romania) Ana Porgras	(Romania) Amelia Racea (Russia) Tatiana Nabieva	none awarded
Floor	(Russia) Tatiana Nabieva	(France) Youna Dufournet	(Romania) Amelia Racea

== Results ==
=== Team competition ===
Oldest and youngest competitors

	Name	Country	Date of birth	Age
Youngest	Cerasela Pătrașcu	Romania	23/12/92	15 years
Oldest	Oksana Chusovitina	Germany	19/06/75	32 years

Rank	Team	Vault (gymnastics)	Uneven bars	Balance beam	Floor (gymnastics)	Total
1st place, gold medalist(s)	Romania	44.050 (1)	45.075 (3)	46.450 (1)	45.950 (1)	181.525
1st place, gold medalist(s)	Steliana Nistor	14.750	15.700	15.525	15.075	181.525
1st place, gold medalist(s)	Sandra Izbașa	15.075		15.350	15.750	181.525
1st place, gold medalist(s)	Anamaria Tămârjan		14.775	15.575	15.125	181.525
1st place, gold medalist(s)	Gabriela Drăgoi	14.225	14.600			181.525
2nd place, silver medalist(s)	Russia	44.000 (2)	46.075 (1)	45.550 (3)	43.850 (4)	179.475
2nd place, silver medalist(s)	Ksenia Semenova		16.200	15.275	14.600	179.475
2nd place, silver medalist(s)	Anna Pavlova	15.050		14.950	15.150	179.475
2nd place, silver medalist(s)	Svetlana Klyukina		14.525	15.325		179.475
2nd place, silver medalist(s)	Karina Myasnikova	14.375	15.350			179.475
2nd place, silver medalist(s)	Ksenia Afanasyeva	14.575			14.100	179.475
3rd place, bronze medalist(s)	France	42.375 (7)	44.525 (4)	45.200 (4)	45.075 (2)	177.175
3rd place, bronze medalist(s)	Pauline Morel	13.650	15.200	15.325	15.000	177.175
3rd place, bronze medalist(s)	Marine Petit	14.525	14.550	15.200	14.900	177.175
3rd place, bronze medalist(s)	Laëtitia Dugain	14.200	14.775	14.675		177.175
3rd place, bronze medalist(s)	Cassy Véricel				15.175	177.175
4	Italy	43.700 (3)	43.575 (7)	44.525 (5)	43.975 (3)	175.775
4	Vanessa Ferrari	14.600	14.950	14.700	15.150	175.775
4	Lia Parolari		14.725	15.275	14.600	175.775
4	Carlotta Giovannini	14.875	13.900		14.225	175.775
4	Monica Bergamelli			14.550		175.775
4	Francesca Benolli	14.225				175.775
5	Ukraine	42.150 (8)	44.250 (5)	45.625 (2)	43.450 (5)	175.475
5	Anastasia Koval	13.400	14.775	15.250	14.425	175.475
5	Alina Kozich	14.425		15.275	14.700	175.475
5	Marina Proskurina	14.325		15.100		175.475
5	Valentyna Holenkova		14.575		14.325	175.475
5	Dariya Zgoba		14.900			175.475
6	Great Britain	43.450 (4)	45.475 (2)	42.025 (7)	43.100 (6)	174.050
6	Laura Jones	14.075	14.025	13.075	14.225	174.050
6	Rebecca Downie	14.750	15.375	14.850		174.050
6	Marissa King	14.625			14.500	174.050
6	Hannah Clowes			14.100	14.375	174.050
6	Beth Tweddle		16.075			174.050
7	Germany	42.700 (5)	44.125 (6)	41.375 (8)	42.650 (7)	170.850
7	Katja Abel	13.425	14.600	13.850	14.450	170.850
7	Oksana Chusovitina	14.875		14.750	14.900	170.850
7	Jenny Brunner		14.400	12.775	13.300	170.850
7	Marie-Sophie Hindermann	14.400	15.125			170.850
8	Netherlands	42.650 (6)	41.050 (8)	42.100 (6)	41.025 (8)	166.825
8	Suzanne Harmes	14.125	14.175	12.175	13.400	166.825
8	Lichelle Wong	13.700	15.050	14.950		166.825
8	Verona van de Leur	14.825			14.025	166.825
8	Anne Tritten		11.825		13.600	166.825
8	Sanne Wevers			14.975		166.825

=== Vault ===
Carlotta Giovannini was the defending champion.

==== Oldest and youngest competitors ====
	Name	Country	Date of birth	Age
Youngest	Rebecca Downie	United Kingdom	24/02/92	16 years
Oldest	Oksana Chusovitina	Germany	19/06/75	32 years

==== Final results ====
Rank	Gymnast	Nation	A Score	B Score	Pen.	Score 1	A Score	B Score	Pen.	Score 2	Total
Rank	Gymnast	Nation	Vault 1				Vault 2				Total
1st place, gold medalist(s)	Oksana Chusovitina	Germany	6.300	9.300		15.600	5.700	8.325		14.025	14.812
2nd place, silver medalist(s)	Carlotta Giovannini	Italy	5.800	9.000		14.800	5.500	9.025		14.525	14.662
3rd place, bronze medalist(s)	Francesca Benolli	Italy	5.800	9.150		14.950	5.200	8.775		13.975	14.462
4	Ariella Käslin	Switzerland	5.300	9.175		14.475	5.500	8.850	0.1	14.250	14.362
5	Anna Pavlova	Russia	5.800	8.225		14.025	5.600	9.050		14.650	14.337
6	Anastassia Marachkouskaya	Belarus	5.500	9.225		14.725	5.000	8.750		13.750	14.237
7	Enikő Korcsmáros	Hungary	5.500	9.075		14.575	4.600	9.150		13.750	14.162
8	Rebecca Downie	United Kingdom	5.500	7.925		13.425	4.800	8.775		13.575	13.500

=== Uneven bars ===
Dariya Zgoba was the defending champion.

==== Oldest and youngest competitors ====
	Name	Country	Date of birth	Age
Youngest	Anastasia Koval	Ukraine	06/11/92	15 years
Oldest	Beth Tweddle	United Kingdom	01/04/85	23 years

==== Final results ====
Rank	Gymnast	Nation	A Score	B Score	Pen.	Total
1st place, gold medalist(s)	Ksenia Semenova	Russia	7.000	8.900		15.900
2nd place, silver medalist(s)	Steliana Nistor	Romania	7.300	8.500		15.800
3rd place, bronze medalist(s)	Dariya Zgoba	Ukraine	6.900	8.825	0.1	15.625
4	Beth Tweddle	United Kingdom	6.800	8.675		15.475
5	Anastasia Koval	Ukraine	6.700	8.725		15.425
6	Lia Parolari	Italy	6.700	8.125		14.825
7	Karina Myasnikova	Russia	6.200	8.600		14.800
8	Rebecca Downie	United Kingdom	6.500	8.500	0.3	14.700

=== Balance beam ===
Yulia Lozhechko was the defending champion.

Oldest and youngest competitors

	Name	Country	Date of birth	Age
Youngest	Ksenia Semenova	Russia	20/10/92	15 years
Oldest	Marina Proskurina	Ukraine	12/08/85	22 years

Final Results

Rank	Gymnast	Nation	A Score	B Score	Pen.	Total
1st place, gold medalist(s)	Ksenia Semenova	Russia	6.700	9.250		15.950
2nd place, silver medalist(s)	Sandra Izbașa	Romania	6.500	8.950		15.450
2nd place, silver medalist(s)	Alina Kozich	Ukraine	6.700	8.750		15.450
4	Pauline Morel	France	6.600	8.700		15.300
5	Vanessa Ferrari	Italy	6.500	8.675		15.175
6	Steliana Nistor	Romania	6.700	8.375		15.075
6	Lenika de Simone	Spain	6.500	8.575		15.075
8	Marina Proskurina	Ukraine	6.300	8.350		14.650

=== Floor ===
Vanessa Ferrari was the defending champion.

Oldest and youngest competitors

	Name	Country	Date of birth	Age
Youngest	Marine Petit	France	15/11/92	15 years
Oldest	Oksana Chusovitina	Germany	19/06/75	32 years

Final Results

Rank	Gymnast	Nation	A Score	B Score	Pen.	Total
1st place, gold medalist(s)	Sandra Izbașa	Romania	6.500	9.275		15.775
2nd place, silver medalist(s)	Beth Tweddle	United Kingdom	6.400	9.125		15.525
3rd place, bronze medalist(s)	Anamaria Tămârjan	Romania	6.000	9.075	0.1	14.975
4	Marine Petit	France	6.100	8.800		14.900
5	Anna Pavlova	Russia	5.900	8.975		14.875
6	Oksana Chusovitina	Germany	5.900	8.950		14.850
7	Cassy Véricel	France	6.300	8.675	0.2	14.775
8	Alina Kozich	Ukraine	5.900	8.900	0.1	14.700

== Juniors ==
=== Team competition ===
Rank	Team	Vault (gymnastics)	Uneven bars	Balance beam	Floor (gymnastics)	Total
1st place, gold medalist(s)	Russia	43.635 (1)	46.175 (1)	46.400 (1)	44.425 (1)	180.625
1st place, gold medalist(s)	Tatiana Nabieva	14.800	15.550	15.625	14.875	180.625
1st place, gold medalist(s)	Aliya Mustafina	14.375	15.600	15.525	14.800	180.625
1st place, gold medalist(s)	Anna Dementyeva	13.675	15.025	12.400	14.750	180.625
1st place, gold medalist(s)	Tatiana Solovyeva	-	-	15.250	14.425	180.625
1st place, gold medalist(s)	Anastasia Novikova	14.450	14.125	-	-	180.625
2nd place, silver medalist(s)	France	42.150 (2)	42.675 (4)	44.150 (3)	41.525 (6)	170.500
2nd place, silver medalist(s)	Youna Dufournet	14.450	15.600	15.700	14.475	170.500
2nd place, silver medalist(s)	Chloé Stanic	13.825	13.875	14.100	13.525	170.500
2nd place, silver medalist(s)	Marine Brevet	-	13.200	14.350	13.475	170.500
2nd place, silver medalist(s)	Marie Gaffino	13.500	-	13.875	13.525	170.500
2nd place, silver medalist(s)	Lea Kemayou	13.875	12.375	-	-	170.500
3rd place, bronze medalist(s)	Netherlands	41.350 (6)	43.850 (2)	42.550 (4)	42.200 (4)	169.950
3rd place, bronze medalist(s)	Céline van Gerner	13.775	14.250	14.350	13.700	169.950
3rd place, bronze medalist(s)	Wyomi Masela	13.800	14.150	13.300	13.850	169.950
3rd place, bronze medalist(s)	Natasja Blind	-	15.025	13.825	14.200	169.950
3rd place, bronze medalist(s)	Yvette Moshage	13.200	-	13.475	14.150	169.950
3rd place, bronze medalist(s)	Naoual Ouazzani-Chadi	13.775	14.575	-	-	169.950
4	Romania	41.375 (5)	40.775 (8)	44.800 (2)	42.950 (2)	169.900
4	Amelia Racea	14.025	13.375	14.875	14.675	169.900
4	Loredana Sabău	13.700	13.950	14.750	14.200	169.900
4	Ana Porgras	13.650	13.450	15.150	14.075	169.900
4	Claudia Voicu	13.250	12.750	14.775	14.075	169.900
5	Italy	41.525 (4)	43.175 (3)	42.450 (5)	42.200 (4)	169.350
5	Paola Galante	13.800	14.500	14.325	14.000	169.350
5	Andrea La Spada	13.875	14.325	14.175	14.175	169.350
5	Elisabetta Preziosa	13.775	13.625	13.800	13.625	169.350
5	Serena Lichetta	13.850	14.350	-	14.025	169.350
5	Eleonora Rando	-	-	13.950	-	169.350
6	Great Britain	40.975 (7)	42.600 (5)	41.375 (7)	42.550 (3)	167.500
6	Jennifer Pinches	13.650	14.300	14.275	14.150	167.500
6	Niamh Rippin	13.175	14.150	13.625	14.100	167.500
6	Danusia Francis	13.600	14.150	13.475	13.725	167.500
6	Nicole Hibbert	13.725	14.100	11.900	14.300	167.500
7	Ukraine	40.100 (11)	41.725 (6)	42.350 (6)	41.000 (7)	165.175
7	Nataliya Kononenko	13.275	14.725	14.350	13.725	165.175
7	Yana Demyanchuk	12.800	13.700	14.550	13.725	165.175
7	Alina Fomenko	13.625	13.300	13.450	13.550	165.175
7	Alona Kaydalova	13.200	-	-	13.400	165.175
7	Anastasiya Gladkova	-	9.850	12.900	-	165.175
8	Belgium	41.650 (3)	39.500 (10)	40.000 (9)	41.000 (7)	162.150
8	Jolien Eggermont	13.950	13.600	13.400	13.800	162.150
8	Renate Masschelin	13.525	13.400	13.500	13.750	162.150
8	Julie Croket	14.175	-	11.975	13.100	162.150
8	Kim Vanlimbergen	-	9.100	13.100	13.450	162.150
8	Floriane Scianguetta	12.725	12.500	-	-	162.150

- The junior team competition also served as qualification for the individual event finals. The 8 highest-ranked teams are shown here; the other teams were Switzerland, Germany, Belarus, Greece, Hungary, Slovenia, Austria, Bulgaria, Finland, Turkey, Czech Republic, Portugal, Poland, Iceland, Sweden, Lithuania, Latvia, Denmark and Norway.

=== Vault ===
Final Results

Rank	Gymnast	A Score	B Score	Pen.	Score 1	A Score	B Score	Pen.	Score 2	Total
Rank	Gymnast	Vault 1				Vault 2				Total
1st place, gold medalist(s)	(France) Youna Dufournet	5.500	9.150		14.650	4.800	9.125		13.925	14.287
2nd place, silver medalist(s)	(Russia) Tatiana Nabieva	5.800	8.900		14.700	5.200	8.500		13.700	14.200
3rd place, bronze medalist(s)	(Russia) Anastasia Novikova	5.500	8.950		14.450	5.000	8.825		13.825	14.137
4	(United Kingdom) Nicole Hibbert	5.500	8.675		14.175	4.800	8.775		13.575	13.875
5	(Belgium) Jolien Eggermont	5.200	8.675		13.875	5.300	8.475		13.775	13.825
6	(Hungary) Renata Tóth	5.000	8.750		13.750	5.000	8.775		13.775	13.762
7	(Poland) Gabriela Janik	5.300	8.925		14.225	5.000	7.900		12.900	13.562
8	(Belgium) Julie Croket	0.000	0.000		0.000	5.200	8.425		13.625	6.812

=== Uneven bars ===
Final Results

Rank	Gymnast	A Score	B Score	Pen.	Total
1st place, gold medalist(s)	(France) Youna Dufournet	6.800	8.825		15.625
2nd place, silver medalist(s)	(Russia) Tatiana Nabieva	6.500	9.000		15.500
3rd place, bronze medalist(s)	(Netherlands) Natasja Blind	6.200	8.550		14.750
4	(Russia) Aliya Mustafina	6.400	8.075		14.475
5	(Italy) Paola Galante	6.900	7.075		13.975
6	(Germany) Elisabeth Seitz	5.600	8.050		13.650
7	(Netherlands) Naoual Ouazzani-Chadi	5.600	8.000		13.600
8	(Ukraine) Nataliya Kononenko	5.800	7.475		13.275

=== Balance beam ===
Final Results

Rank	Gymnast	A Score	B Score	Pen.	Total
1st place, gold medalist(s)	(Romania) Ana Porgras	6.600	9.100		15.700
2nd place, silver medalist(s)	(Romania) Amelia Racea	6.400	8.750		15.150
2nd place, silver medalist(s)	(Russia) Tatiana Nabieva	6.300	8.850		15.150
4	(Ukraine) Nataliya Kononenko	6.000	8.875		14.875
5	(France) Youna Dufournet	6.900	7.925		14.825
6	(Ukraine) Yana Demyanchuk	6.500	7.950		14.450
7	(Netherlands) Yvette Moshage	6.000	8.225	0.3	13.925
8	(France) Marine Brevet	5.200	8.675		13.875

=== Floor ===
Final Results

Rank	Gymnast	A Score	B Score	Pen.	Total
1st place, gold medalist(s)	(Russia) Tatiana Nabieva	5.900	8.900		14.800
2nd place, silver medalist(s)	(France) Youna Dufournet	6.100	8.675		14.775
3rd place, bronze medalist(s)	(Romania) Amelia Racea	5.800	8.950		14.750
4	(Russia) Aliya Mustafina	5.700	8.675		14.375
5	(Italy) Andrea La Spada	5.400	8.925		14.325
5	(United Kingdom) Nicole Hibbert	5.500	8.825		14.325
7	(Romania) Loredana Sabău	5.600	8.650		14.250
8	(Netherlands) Natasja Blind	5.400	8.075	0.5	12.975
