= Yana Demyanchuk =

Ukrainian artistic gymnast

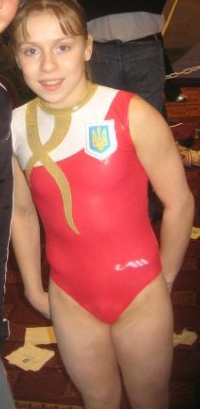
- Demyanchuk in 2009

Personal information
- Full name: Yana Vladimirovna Demyanchuk
- Born: 22 October 1993 (age 32) Ivano-Frankivsk, Ukraine

Gymnastics career
- Discipline: Women's artistic gymnastics
- Country represented: Ukraine
Medal record
European Championships
| Gold medal – first place | 2009 Milan | Balance beam |
Universiade
| Silver medal – second place | 2011 Shenzhen | Team all-around |

Yana Vladimirovna Demyanchuk (Ukrainian: Яна Дем'янчук, born 1993) is a Ukrainian artistic gymnast who won gold on the balance beam at the 2009 European Artistic Gymnastics Championships.

== Early life and training ==
Demyanchuk started gymnastics at 6 years of age. Initially, she trained in Ivano-Frankivsk, and later at the Republic Higher School of Physical Education in Kyiv.

== Gymnastics career ==
=== 2007–08 ===
Demyanchuk began her senior career in 2007 at a tri-country meet between Ukraine, Germany, and Catalonia. On vault, she competed a Yurchenko layout. On floor exercise, her tumbling passes were a double pike, a layout double twist, a front one-and-a-half twist to front layout, and a front handspring through to a layout full twist. On uneven bars, she performed a Tkatchev, a toe-on Tkatchev, a Pak salto, and a double pike dismount. On balance beam, her skills included a front tuck, back tuck, standing Arabian, roundoff–back layout, and double tuck dismount.

In 2008, she competed at the Voronin Cup in Moscow, placing 3rd in the all-around and in the vault, floor exercise, and uneven bars finals. She also competed at the Junior European Championships, where she finished 6th in the balance beam final.

=== 2009 ===
In February, Demyanchuk competed at the 2009 WOGA Classic in Frisco, Texas, where she placed 3rd in the all-around, 1st on uneven bars, 2nd on floor exercise, and 4th on the balance beam. She also competed at the Nadia Comăneci International Invitational in Oklahoma City, where she placed 2nd in the all-around (behind 2008 Olympic floor exercise champion Sandra Izbaşa of Romania), 3rd on vault, 1st on uneven bars, 4th on balance beam, and 3rd on floor exercise.

Demyanchuk had her breakout competition at the 2009 European Championships in April, winning the balance beam title ahead of Olympians Anamaria Tămârjan and Gabriela Drăgoi of Romania. She also qualified 4th into the all-around final, where she placed 12th.

At the 2009 World Artistic Gymnastics Championships in London in October, Demyanchuk competed with Ukrainian teammates Dariya Zgoba, Valentina Holenkova, and Anastasia Koval, but performed poorly. She was the second reserve for the all-around final after finishing 26th in qualifications. She was 37th on the uneven bars, 46th on beam, and 30th on floor, and did not compete in any finals.

Demyanchuk went on to compete at the Swiss Cup in Zürich, where she and Mykola Kuksenkov placed 4th, behind one Swiss pair and two German pairs, with a total score of 29.3 in the last round.

=== 2010 ===
At the 2010 World Championships in Rotterdam, Demyanchuk competed on only two events, bars and beam. She placed 10th on beam in the preliminary round and qualified to the event final, where she fell on her dismount and finished 8th with a score of 13.733.
