= Gabriela Drăgoi =

Romanian artistic gymnast

- Nickname: Gabi
- Born: August 28, 1992 (age 34)

Gymnastics career
- Discipline: Women's artistic gymnastics
- Country represented: Romania
- Club: CSS Buzău
- Head coaches: Octavian Bellu, Mariana Bitang
- Assistant coach: Liliana Cozma
- Former coaches: Nicolae Forminte, Costică Cliniciu, Gabriela Trușcă
- Choreographer: Puia Valer
Medal record
Olympic Games
Bronze medal – third place	2008 Beijing	Team
European Championships
Gold medal – first place	2008 Clermont	Team
Bronze medal – third place	2009 Milan	Balance beam
European Youth Olympic Festival
Bronze medal – third place	2007 Belgrade	Team

Gabriela Drăgoi (born August 28, 1992, in Buzău, Romania) is a Romanian artistic gymnast. She is an Olympic bronze medalist and a European gold medalist with the team. Individually, she is a European bronze medalist on balance beam.

== Early gymnastics career ==
Drăgoi began gymnastics at the age of four at CSS Buzău, training under Costică Cliniciu and 1976 Olympic silver medalist Gabriela Trușcă (now Gabriela Robu). In 2007, she placed fourth in the all-around at the 7th Lugano International Trophy and eighth all-around, sixth on vault, eighth on uneven bars and fourth on floor at the 27th International Junior Competition in Yokohama.

== Senior career ==
=== 2008 and the Olympic Games ===
Drăgoi's first major international competition was the 2008 European Championships, where she competed in the team finals after Cerasela Pătraşcu injured her foot during qualifications. Drăgoi helped the Romanian team win the gold medal by competing on vault (14.225) and uneven bars (14.600).

At the 2008 Romanian Nationals, Drăgoi placed first on beam, ahead of the more experienced Steliana Nistor. She also placed seventh in the all-around and sixth on vault, and was selected—along with Nistor, Sandra Izbaşa, Andreea Grigore, Andreea Acatrinei, and Anamaria Tămârjan—to be a member of the Romanian team at the 2008 Olympic Games.

At the Olympics, Drăgoi helped Romania qualify in fourth place to the team finals by competing on uneven bars (14.225), beam (15.450), and floor (14.250). Her score on floor was the lowest among her teammates and was not counted. However, her score on beam was the highest, and she qualified to the beam final in seventh place. In the team final, she helped Romania win the bronze medal by competing on the uneven bars (14.425). Individually, she placed fifth in the beam final with a score of 15.625.

=== 2009 ===
Struggling with health problems, Drăgoi was not at her full physical potential at the 2009 European Championships. However, she qualified to the beam finals in sixth place and was ninth on uneven bars. She won bronze in the beam finals behind her teammate Tămârjan and Ukrainian Yana Demyanchuk. In May, she competed at the Glasgow Grand Prix, where she won the bronze on balance beam and placed fifth on uneven bars and sixth on floor. Later that year, she replaced an injured Izbaşa at the 2009 World Artistic Gymnastics Championships. There, she placed 11th and 17th in the uneven bars and beam qualifications, respectively.

=== 2010 ===
In January 2010, Drăgoi underwent surgery for a torn tibia. She made a comeback in August at a friendly meet in Great Britain, where she placed first with the team and fourth on uneven bars. Later that year, she was selected to the Romanian team for the 2010 World Championships. She placed fourth with the team at Worlds.
