= Gymnastics at the 2008 Summer Olympics – Women's artistic team all-around =

Women's artistic team all-around at the Games of the XXIX Olympiad

Medalists
1st place, gold medalist(s)		Yang Yilin; Cheng Fei; Jiang Yuyuan; Deng Linlin; He Kexin; Li Shanshan	China
2nd place, silver medalist(s)		Shawn Johnson; Nastia Liukin; Chellsie Memmel; Samantha Peszek; Alicia Sacramone; Bridget Sloan	United States
3rd place, bronze medalist(s)		Andreea Acatrinei; Gabriela Drăgoi; Andreea Grigore; Sandra Izbaşa; Steliana Nistor; Anamaria Tămârjan	Romania

The women's artistic team all-around competition at the 2008 Summer Olympics was held at the Beijing National Indoor Stadium on August 13, 2008.

Teams qualified through the general artistic qualification performances. Each team was composed of six gymnasts. Five of those gymnasts performed on each of the four apparatus, and four of those scores counted towards the team total. The eight teams with the best combined scores in the qualification moved on to the team final.

In the team final, each team selected three gymnasts to compete on each apparatus. All three scores counted for the team score; the three scores on each apparatus were summed to give a final team score.

== Qualified teams ==
The eight teams with the highest scores in qualifying proceed to the women's artistic team finals.

Position	Country	Vault (gymnastics)	Uneven bars	Balance beam	Floor (gymnastics)	Total
1	China	61.825	62.650	63.050	60.750	248.275
2	United States	62.225	61.125	63.400	60.050	246.800
3	Russia	60.850	61.775	62.000	59.775	244.400
4	Romania	59.725	58.450	60.950	59.300	238.425
5	Australia	59.450	59.050	58.625	58.325	235.450
6	France	58.825	58.525	58.975	57.550	233.875
7	Brazil	59.450	58.425	56.675	59.250	233.800
8	Japan	58.050	58.725	59.900	56.500	233.175

== Final ==
Rank	Country	Vault (gymnastics)	Uneven bars	Balance beam	Floor (gymnastics)	Total
	China	46.350 (2)	49.625 (1)	47.125 (2)	45.800 (1)	188.900
	Yang Yilin	15.100	16.800			188.900
	Cheng Fei	16.000		15.150	15.450	188.900
	Jiang Yuyuan		15.975		15.200	188.900
	Deng Linlin	15.250		15.925	15.150	188.900
	He Kexin		16.850			188.900
	Li Shanshan			16.050		188.900
	United States	46.875 (1)	47.975 (2)	47.250 (1)	44.425 (3)	186.525
	Shawn Johnson	16.000	15.350	16.175	15.100	186.525
	Nastia Liukin		16.900	15.975	15.200	186.525
	Chellsie Memmel		15.725			186.525
	Samantha Peszek					186.525
	Alicia Sacramone	15.675		15.100	14.125	186.525
	Bridget Sloan	15.200				186.525
	Romania	45.275 (4)	45.000 (5)	46.175 (3)	45.075 (2)	181.525
	Andreea Acatrinei					181.525
	Gabriela Drăgoi		14.425			181.525
	Andreea Grigore					181.525
	Sandra Izbaşa	15.100		15.600	15.550	181.525
	Steliana Nistor	15.050	16.150	15.150	14.575	181.525
	Anamaria Tamarjan	15.125	14.425	15.425	14.950	181.525
4	Russia	45.425 (3)	46.950 (3)	44.900 (6)	43.350 (4)	180.625
4	Ksenia Afanasyeva	15.075	14.925		14.375	180.625
4	Svetlana Klyukina	15.150				180.625
4	Ekaterina Kramarenko		15.575		15.125	180.625
4	Anna Pavlova	15.200		15.100	13.850	180.625
4	Ksenia Semenova		16.450	15.225		180.625
4	Ludmila Ezhova			14.575		180.625
5	Japan	43.550 (8)	45.525 (4)	44.950 (5)	42.675 (8)	176.700
5	Mayu Kuroda		15.350	14.725		176.700
5	Kyoko Oshima	14.450	14.750		14.450	176.700
5	Yu Minobe					176.700
5	Miki Uemura	14.475				176.700
5	Yuko Shintake	14.625		15.000	14.025	176.700
5	Koko Tsurumi		15.425	15.225	14.200	176.700
6	Australia	44.150 (6)	43.575 (8)	45.900 (4)	42.775 (7)	176.400
6	Georgia Bonora	14.625			14.450	176.400
6	Ashleigh Brennan			15.125	14.650	176.400
6	Daria Joura		14.675			176.400
6	Lauren Mitchell	14.700		15.550	13.675	176.400
6	Shona Morgan	14.825	13.800	15.225		176.400
6	Olivia Vivian		15.100			176.400
7	France	44.050 (7)	44.175 (6)	43.725 (8)	43.325 (5)	175.275
7	Marine Debauve			13.975		175.275
7	Laetitia Dugain		14.725	14.750	13.925	175.275
7	Katheleen Lindor	14.825	14.775			175.275
7	Pauline Morel		14.675		14.625	175.275
7	Marine Petit	14.675		15.000	14.775	175.275
7	Rose-Eliandre Bellemare	14.550				175.275
8	Brazil	44.300 (5)	43.700 (7)	43.900 (7)	42.975 (6)	174.875
8	Jade Barbosa	15.025	14.725	15.300	14.325	174.875
8	Ethiene Franco			13.675		174.875
8	Laís Souza	14.600	14.350			174.875
8	Daniele Hypólito		14.625	14.925		174.875
8	Daiane dos Santos	14.675			15.275	174.875
8	Ana Cláudia Silva				13.375	174.875
