= Ksenia Afanasyeva =

Russian artistic gymnast

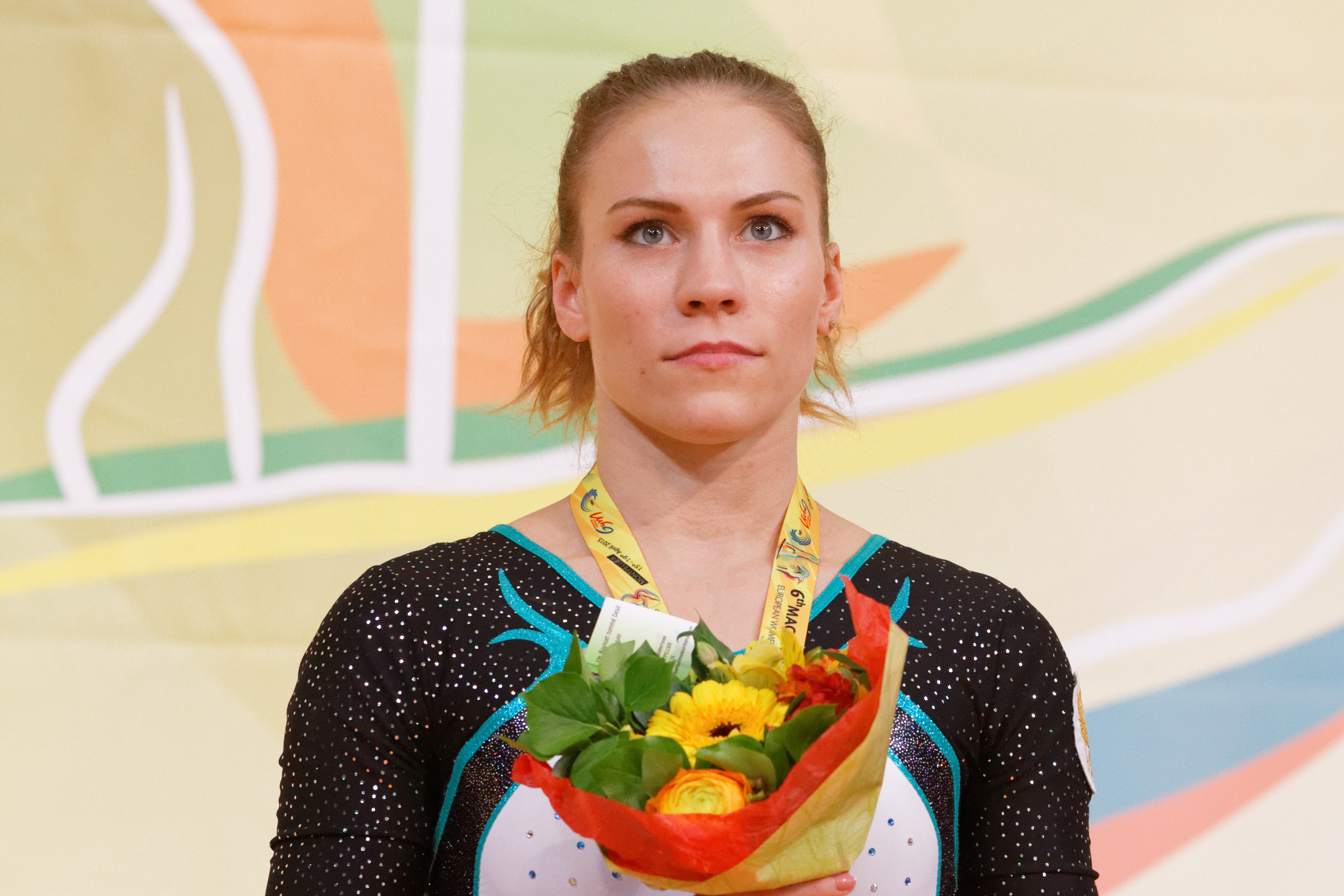
- Afanasyeva at the 2015 European Championships

Personal information
- Full name: Ksenia Dmitrievna Afanasyeva
- Born: September 13, 1991 (age 34) Tula, RSFSR, USSR, now Russia
- Height: 158 cm (5 ft 2 in)

Gymnastics career
- Discipline: Women's artistic gymnastics
- Country represented: Russia (2005–2016)
- Club: CSKA Moscow
- Gym: "Lake Krugloe"
- Head coach: Marina Vladimirovna Nazarova
- Former coach: Sergey Olegovich Gaiderov
- Choreographer: Olga Burova
- Retired: 21 July 2016
Medal record
Event	1st	2nd	3rd
Olympic Games	0	1	0
World Championships	2	2	0
European Championships	3	2	2
Pacific Rim Championships	0	0	2
Summer Universiade	3	1	0
Total	8	6	4
Representing Russia
Olympic Games
Silver medal – second place	2012 London	Team
World Championships
Gold medal – first place	2010 Rotterdam	Team
Gold medal – first place	2011 Tokyo	Floor
Silver medal – second place	2011 Tokyo	Team
Silver medal – second place	2015 Glasgow	Floor
European Championships
Gold medal – first place	2013 Moscow	Floor
Gold medal – first place	2015 Montpellier	Floor
Gold medal – first place	2016 Bern	Team
Silver medal – second place	2008 Clermont	Team
Silver medal – second place	2009 Milan	All-Around
Bronze medal – third place	2015 Montpellier	Vault
Bronze medal – third place	2016 Bern	Vault
Pacific Rim Championships
Bronze medal – third place	2010 Melbourne	All-Around
Bronze medal – third place	2010 Melbourne	Uneven bars
Summer Universiade
Gold medal – first place	2013 Kazan	Team
Gold medal – first place	2013 Kazan	Vault
Gold medal – first place	2013 Kazan	Floor
Silver medal – second place	2013 Kazan	All-Around

Ksenia Dmitrievna Afanasyeva (Russian: Ксения Дмитриевна Афанасьева; born 13 September 1991) is a retired Russian artistic gymnast who competed at the 2008 and 2012 Summer Olympics. She is the 2011 world champion on floor exercise, the 2013 and 2015 European floor champion, and the 2013 Universiade vault and floor champion. Widely regarded as one of the most original and artistic gymnasts of all time, she retired from elite gymnastics in July 2016 due to kidney disease, a month away from the 2016 Summer Olympics, for which she was the Russian team's first alternate.

== Junior career ==
=== 2005 ===
Afanasyeva competed at the European Youth Olympic Festival in Lignano Sabbiadoro, Italy, in July 2005. She won the bronze medal in the all-around competition with a total score of 36.550, behind Vanessa Ferrari of Italy (37.925) and fellow Russian Karina Myasnikova (37.000). In event finals, she placed fourth on vault and won bronze medals on balance beam and floor exercise. She also helped Russia win the team competition.

=== 2006 ===
In April, Afanasyeva competed at the European Championships in Volos, Greece, where Russia won the junior team competition. She performed on vault, uneven bars and beam.

== Senior career ==
=== 2007–08 ===
In 2007, Afanasyeva placed second on balance beam at the World Cup event in Paris, scoring 15.175.

In April 2008, she competed at the European Championships in Clermont-Ferrand, France, contributing scores of 14.575 on vault and 14.100 on floor toward the Russian team's second-place finish. The following month, at the World Cup event in Tianjin, China, she placed second on vault, scoring 14.350; third on uneven bars, scoring 15.075; and fifth on balance beam, scoring 15.275.

At the end of May, she competed at the World Cup event in Moscow. She placed seventh on vault, scoring 13.887, and second on floor, scoring 14.775.

==== Beijing Olympics ====
Afanasyeva was a member of the Russian team at the 2008 Summer Olympics in Beijing, along with Ludmilla Ezhova, Svetlana Kliukina, Ekaterina Kramarenko, Anna Pavlova, and Ksenia Semyonova. In qualifications, she placed sixth in the all-around with a score of 60.800 but did not advance to the final due to the two-per-country rule (only two gymnasts per country can advance to each final, and Pavlova and Semyonova finished ahead of her). In the team final, she contributed scores of 15.075 on vault, 14.925 on uneven bars, and 14.375 on floor toward the Russian team's fourth-place finish. In the balance beam final, she placed seventh with a score of 14.825.

=== 2009 ===
In April, Afanasyeva competed at the European Championships in Milan, Italy. She placed second in the all-around final with a score of 57.600 and fourth in the uneven bars final, scoring 14.650.

She was named to Russia's four-gymnast delegation for the 2009 World Championships in London, but was unable to compete because of a back injury.

=== 2010 ===
Afanasyeva competed at the Pacific Rim Championships in Melbourne, Australia, in April and placed third in the all-around competition with a score of 57.450. In event finals, she placed third on uneven bars, scoring 14.250; fourth on balance beam, scoring 14.525; and sixth on floor, scoring 13.675.

The following month, she competed at the World Cup event in Moscow, where she placed third on balance beam, scoring 13.500. In July, she won the all-around competition at the Japan Cup in Tokyo with a score of 58.350.

In October, at the World Championships in Rotterdam, she contributed a score of 14.800 on floor toward the Russian team's first-place finish. In the floor final, she placed eighth with a score of 12.700.

=== 2011 ===
In May, Afanasyeva competed at the World Cup event in Moscow. She placed second on balance beam, scoring 14.200, and second on floor, scoring 14.200.

At the World Championships in Tokyo in October, she contributed scores of 14.800 on vault and 14.633 on floor toward Russia's second-place finish in the team final. She placed seventh in the all-around competition with a score of 56.732 and first on floor with a score of 15.133.

=== 2012 ===
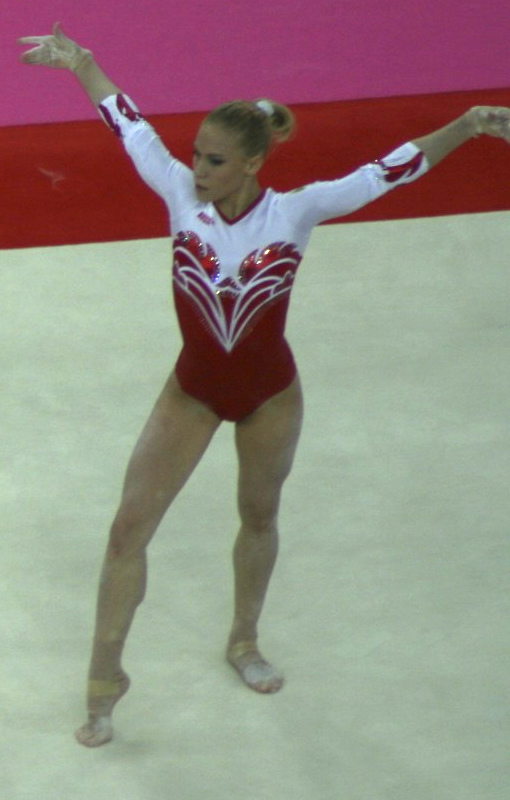
Afanasyeva performing on floor during the team final at London 2012 on 31 July.

In March, Afanasyeva competed at the Russian National Championships in Penza and placed second in the all-around with a score of 58.387. In event finals, she placed first on balance beam, scoring 14.980, and second on floor, scoring 14.180. She sustained a small leg injury but was able to return to competition in June at the Russian Cup, where she placed fourth in the all-around with a score of 56.067.

==== London Olympics ====
At the 2012 Summer Olympics in London, Afanasyeva was the captain of the Russian team, which consisted of her, Anastasia Grishina, Viktoria Komova, Aliya Mustafina, and Maria Paseka. She described herself as more nervous than the rest of the team, but said, "Gymnastics is about beauty and grace. We are strong and beautiful. Our rivals may have upgraded their routines before us, yet we represent beauty. My girls didn’t surprise me at the European Championships because I see them every day. I know what they are capable of doing."

Afanasyeva scored 15.066 on balance beam and 14.833 on floor during qualifications on 29 July. In the team final on 31 July, she contributed scores of 14.833 on balance beam and 14.333 on floor toward the Russian team's second-place finish. In event finals on 7 August, she placed fifth on balance beam, scoring 14.583, and sixth on floor after stepping out of bounds twice and scoring 14.566.

=== 2013 ===
Afanasyeva performing on floor at the 2011 Mexico Open Gymnastics in Acapulco

Afanasyeva began her year by performing at a gala called "From London to Rio", along with Paseka, Pavlova, Sandra Izbașa, Cătălina Ponor, and other gymnasts.

In March, she competed at the Russian National Championships in Penza and placed fourth in the all-around with a score of 56.850. She also contributed scores of 15.000 on vault, 12.750 on balance beam, and 14.450 on floor toward the Central team's first-place finish. In event finals, she placed third on balance beam, scoring 13.775, and first on floor, scoring 13.600.

Later in March, Afanasyeva competed at the 19th French International in La Roche-sur-Yon. She placed fourth on balance beam with a score of 13.066, and won gold on the floor exercise with a score of 14.633.

At the European Championships in Moscow in April, she placed fifth in the all-around in qualifications with a score of 55.099 but did not advance to the final due to the two-per-country rule. She won the gold medal in the floor final with a score of 15.166.

In July, she helped Russia finish first at the 2013 Summer Universiade with scores of 15.000 on vault, 12.550 on uneven bars, 14.250 on balance beam, and 14.750 on floor exercise. In doing so, she also qualified second to the all-around final behind Mustafina, fourth to the vault final, and first to the floor final. She went on to win the all-around silver medal, with Mustafina taking the gold. During the vault final, she debuted an Amanar and, in an upset over teammate Paseka, tied for first place with North Korean gymnast Hong Un-Jong with a score of 15.125. She also won the floor final.

In August, Afanasyeva was named to the Russian team for the World Championships, and did not compete at the Russian Cup to rest for Worlds. However, at the end of August, she underwent surgery for an ankle injury, and missed the World Championships as a result.

In October she appeared at the Gala de Estrellas de las Gimnasias in Mexico, a charity gala, performing her floor routine (with watered-down tumbles) and dancing on the beam to "I Will Survive", alongside gymnasts such as Izbașa, Andreea Răducan, and Diego Hypólito.

=== 2014 ===
In January Afanasyeva underwent a second ankle surgery, as the previous one had not improved her condition. In April she competed at the Russian Championships, where she performed only on the vault and the floor. She helped her team to the gold medal, but withdrew from the vault final after a fall during the team final exacerbated her ankle injury. She underwent yet another surgery, which required her to miss the World Championships for the second consecutive year.

Afanasyeva returned to international competition in late November at the Stuttgart World Cup. She debuted a new floor routine (watered down to three tumbles to help with her recovery) and performed a solid double-twisting Yurchenko vault, helping her team to a silver medal.

In December, she competed at the Voronin Cup, winning gold on floor and silver on vault.

=== 2015 ===
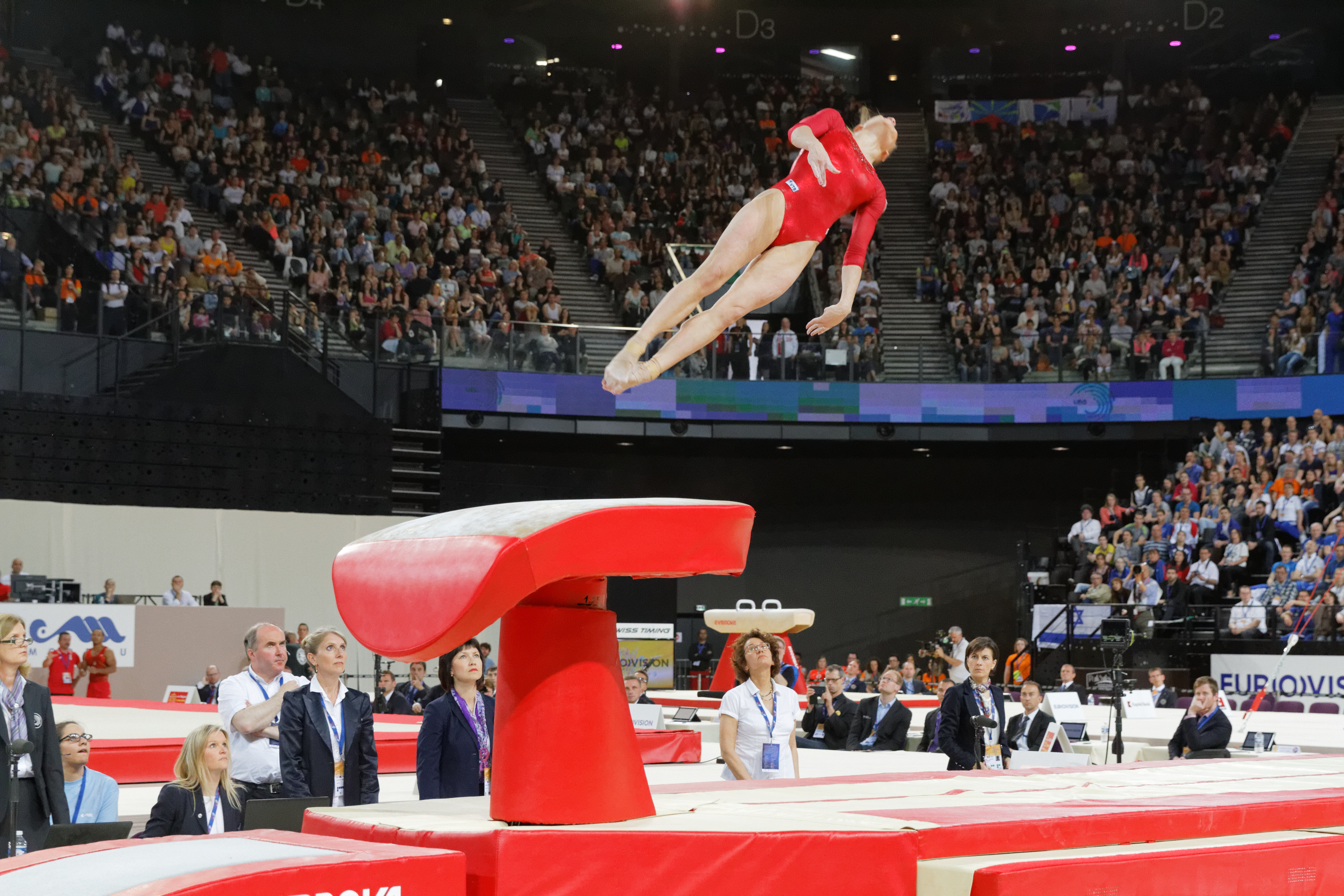
Afanasyeva on vault at the 2015 European Championships.

Afanasyeva competed at the Russian Championships in March, winning team and floor exercise gold, and placing fourth on vault.

April saw a return to her pre-injury form, when she travelled to France for the European Championships and was crowned floor champion with a score of 14.733, as well as picking up a bronze medal on the vault after competing an Amanar and a Lopez and scoring 14.866. She admitted in an interview afterward that she had only successfully performed the Amanar vault twice in her life: once when she won the vault title at the 2013 Summer Universiade, and the second time in Montpellier. "If I didn't dare to try it, I would have had no chance," she said. "Either I'd win the bronze medal or I'd fall, but nothing ventured, nothing gained." She was officially congratulated by Vladimir Gruzdev, the governor of Afanasyeva's home region, Tula Oblast, who said, "The gold medal in the floor exercise was the result of hard work, perseverance, and determination. Your countrymen are proud of your achievements. I am confident that a strong character and skill will continue to serve as collateral for your athletic success."

In August, she competed at the Batumi International.

In September she competed at the Russian Cup in preparation for the World Championships. She performed well, helping her team to the silver medal, and individually winning gold on floor (14.700), silver on beam (14.333) and bronze on vault (14.334). Following this meet, she was named to the nominative list for the 2015 World Championships.

Afanasyeva looked weak in podium training in Glasgow, and revealed that she was suffering from kidney stones and had spent a week in hospital. The Russian team performed well in qualifications, with Afanasyeva posting a 14.866 on vault and a 14.633 on floor, qualifying fourth individually into the floor final, and helping the team to qualify in second position to the team final. In the team final, the Russians started strongly on vault, with Afanasyeva improving on her qualifying score with a 15.066 for her double-twisting Yurchenko. However, with one fall on bars and three falls on beam, the Russians finished in fourth place and out of the medals, despite Afanasyeva's score of 14.500 on floor. Her final performance at the 2015 World Championships came in the floor final, where she upgraded her difficulty to a 6.4 and scored 15.100 to win the silver medal behind the USA's Simone Biles.

In December she competed at the Toyota International Cup in Japan, along with teammates Komova, Paseka, and Daria Spiridonova. She finished fifth on vault and won the floor final with a score of 14.500, ahead of Japan's Sae Miyakawa, who scored 14.450.

=== 2016 ===
Ksenia Afanasyeva's health problems continued, and in January it was announced that she was undergoing ankle surgery in Munich for the fourth time.

In April she competed at the Russian Championships. Having suffered a rip on the bottom of her foot a few days prior to the competition, she competed only a watered-down floor routine in qualifications and missed the team competition, which Russia won. She came back in event finals with an improved floor routine to share the floor title with Angelina Melnikova, and was announced as part of the Russian team for the European Championships.

Afanasyeva originally intended to compete on vault, beam and floor for the Russians in Bern, but an exacerbation of her ankle injury a few days before the beginning of podium training put paid to her plans. Seda Tutkhalyan was brought in to cover the team on beam and floor, and in the absence of vault superstar Paseka, Afanasyeva competed two vaults in the qualifying round and qualified third into the vault event final. She competed on vault in the team final, helping Russia to the gold medal ahead of Great Britain and France, and then performed again in the vault event final, winning an individual bronze medal to add to Russia's haul.

Another ankle operation beckoned, and in June Afanasyeva found herself once again in Munich. Having originally been announced as part of the Russian team for the Olympic Games in Rio, she was announced as an alternate, with Tutkhalyan taking her place on the team.

== Floor music ==
2005–2006: "Dancing With the Muse"
2007–2008: "Isadora" and "L for Love"
2009: "Ballet" and "Nuclear"
2010–2011: "The Color of the Night"
2011: "Tango in the Night"/"Infiltrado"
2012–2013: "Pulmon", "Ironside" and "Grand Guignol"
2014: "El Tango de Roxane" - José Feliciano, Ewan McGregor, Jacek Koman
2015: "Halo Theme (cover)" - Lindsey Stirling and William Joseph
2015 Worlds: "Puddit" by Al Jarreau

== Competitive history ==
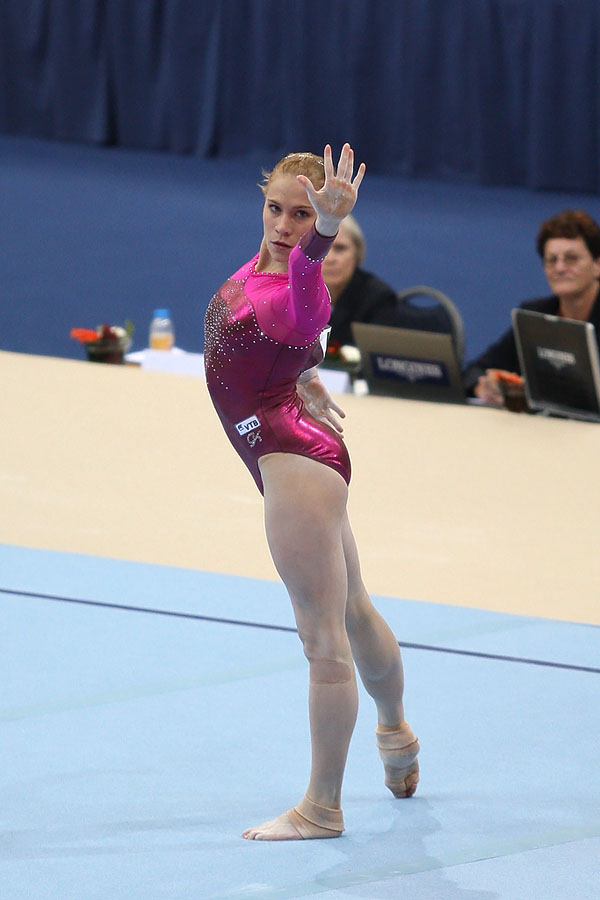
Afanasyeva on floor at the 2010 World Championships.

Afanasyeva's gymnastics include strong technique, difficult skills, and consistency. She excels especially on floor where she displays both difficult tumbling elements and difficult dance elements.

Competitive history of Ksenia Afanasyeva
Year	Event	Team	AA	VT	UB	BB	FX
2005	European Youth Olympic Festival	1st place, gold medalist(s)	3rd place, bronze medalist(s)			3rd place, bronze medalist(s)	3rd place, bronze medalist(s)
2006
2006	Junior European Championships	1st place, gold medalist(s)					
2007	Paris World Cup					2nd place, silver medalist(s)	
2008	Russian National Championships			2nd place, silver medalist(s)	4	6	4
2008	European Championships	2nd place, silver medalist(s)					
2008	Moscow World Cup			7			2nd place, silver medalist(s)
2008	Tianjin World Cup			2nd place, silver medalist(s)	3rd place, bronze medalist(s)	5	
2008	Russian Cup		1st place, gold medalist(s)				
2008	Swiss Cup	3rd place, bronze medalist(s)					
2008	Olympic Games	4				7	
2008	Arthur Gander Memorial		5		3rd place, bronze medalist(s)	8	2nd place, silver medalist(s)
2009	Russian National Championships	2nd place, silver medalist(s)	6		3rd place, bronze medalist(s)	2nd place, silver medalist(s)	6
2009	European Championships		2nd place, silver medalist(s)		4		
2009	Russian Cup		2nd place, silver medalist(s)		8	1st place, gold medalist(s)	1st place, gold medalist(s)
2010	Pacific Rim Championships		3rd place, bronze medalist(s)		3rd place, bronze medalist(s)	4	6
2010	Japan Cup	1st place, gold medalist(s)	1st place, gold medalist(s)				
2010	Russian Cup		2nd place, silver medalist(s)		5		2nd place, silver medalist(s)
2010	Holland Invitational	1st place, gold medalist(s)	2nd place, silver medalist(s)				
2010	World Championships	1st place, gold medalist(s)					8
2010	Elite Gym Massilia	1st place, gold medalist(s)	3rd place, bronze medalist(s)		3rd place, bronze medalist(s)	2nd place, silver medalist(s)	1st place, gold medalist(s)
2011	Russian Cup		4		7	7	1st place, gold medalist(s)
2011	Dinamo International		2nd place, silver medalist(s)		6	6	1st place, gold medalist(s)
2011	World Championships	2nd place, silver medalist(s)	7				1st place, gold medalist(s)
2011	Mexican Open		1st place, gold medalist(s)				
2012	Russian National Championships	2nd place, silver medalist(s)	2nd place, silver medalist(s)			1st place, gold medalist(s)	2nd place, silver medalist(s)
2012	Russian Cup	2nd place, silver medalist(s)	4		7	8	
2012	Olympic Games	2nd place, silver medalist(s)				5	6
2013	Russian National Championships	1st place, gold medalist(s)	4			3rd place, bronze medalist(s)	1st place, gold medalist(s)
2013	La Roche-sur-Yon World Cup					4	1st place, gold medalist(s)
2013	European Championships						1st place, gold medalist(s)
2013	Universiade	1st place, gold medalist(s)	2nd place, silver medalist(s)	1st place, gold medalist(s)			1st place, gold medalist(s)
2014	Russian National Championships	1st place, gold medalist(s)					
2014	Stuttgart World Cup	2nd place, silver medalist(s)					
2014	Voronin Cup			2nd place, silver medalist(s)			1st place, gold medalist(s)
2015	Russian National Championships	1st place, gold medalist(s)		4			1st place, gold medalist(s)
2015	European Championships			3rd place, bronze medalist(s)			1st place, gold medalist(s)
2015	Russian Cup	2nd place, silver medalist(s)		3rd place, bronze medalist(s)		2nd place, silver medalist(s)	1st place, gold medalist(s)
2015	World Championships	4					2nd place, silver medalist(s)
2015	Toyota International Cup			5			1st place, gold medalist(s)
2016	Russian National Championships	1st place, gold medalist(s)					1st place, gold medalist(s)
2016	European Championships	1st place, gold medalist(s)		3rd place, bronze medalist(s)			

Year	Competition Description	Location	Apparatus	Rank-Final	Score-Final	Rank-Qualifying	Score-Qualifying
2008	European Championships	Clermont-Ferrand	Team	2	179.475	2	176.425
2008	European Championships	Clermont-Ferrand	Balance Beam			14	14.700
2008	European Championships	Clermont-Ferrand	Floor Exercise			20	14.225
2008	Olympic Games	Beijing	Team	4	180.625	3	244.400
2008	Olympic Games	Beijing	All-Around			6	60.800
2008	Olympic Games	Beijing	Uneven Bars			21	14.825
2008	Olympic Games	Beijing	Balance Beam	7	14.825	7	15.775
2008	Olympic Games	Beijing	Floor Exercise			9	15.025
2009	European Championships	Milan	All-Around	2	57.600	20	54.575
2009	European Championships	Milan	Uneven Bars	4	14.650	3	14.825
2009	European Championships	Milan	Balance Beam			50	12.025
2009	European Championships	Milan	Floor Exercise			30	13.250
2010	World Championships	Rotterdam	Team	1	175.397	1	234.521
2010	World Championships	Rotterdam	All-Around			17	55.465
2010	World Championships	Rotterdam	Uneven Bars			107	11.866
2010	World Championships	Rotterdam	Balance Beam			9	14.533
2010	World Championships	Rotterdam	Floor Exercise	8	12.700	2	14.766
2011	World Championships	Tokyo	Team	2	175.329	2	231.062
2011	World Championships	Tokyo	All-Around	7	56.732	6	56.941
2011	World Championships	Tokyo	Uneven Bars			21	14.083
2011	World Championships	Tokyo	Balance Beam			28	14.100
2011	World Championships	Tokyo	Floor Exercise	1	15.133	10	14.325
2012	Olympic Games	London	Team	2	178.530	2	180.429
2012	Olympic Games	London	Balance Beam	5	14.583	7	15.066
2012	Olympic Games	London	Floor Exercise	6	14.566	4	14.833
2013	European Championships	Moscow	All-Around			5	55.099
2013	European Championships	Moscow	Uneven Bars			30	12.466
2013	European Championships	Moscow	Balance Beam			15	13.100
2013	European Championships	Moscow	Floor Exercise	1	15.166	1	14.633
2015	European Championships	Montpellier	Vault	3	14.866	3	14.533
2015	European Championships	Montpellier	Floor Exercise	1	14.733	2	14.266
2015	World Championships	Glasgow	Team	4	171.964	2	231.437
2015	World Championships	Glasgow	Floor Exercise	2	15.100	4	14.633
2016	European Championships	Bern	Team	1	175.212	2	173.261
2016	European Championships	Bern	Vault	3	14.699	3	14.753

== See also ==
- List of Olympic female gymnasts for Russia
