= Andreea Grigore =

Romanian gymnast (born 1991)

- Full name: Andreea Florentina Grigore
- Born: 11 April 1991 (age 35) Bucharest, Romania
- Height: 146 cm (4 ft 9 in)

Gymnastics career
- Discipline: Women's artistic gymnastics
- Country represented: Romania
- Club: Steaua București
- Head coach: Octavian Bellu
- Assistant coach: Mariana Bitang
- Retired: 2008
Medal record
Olympic Games
Bronze medal – third place	2008 Beijing	Team
World Championships
Bronze medal – third place	2007 Stuttgart	Team

Andreea Florentina Grigore (born 11 April 1991) is a Romanian former artistic gymnast. She competed at the 2008 Summer Olympics and won a bronze medal with Romania in the team event. Additionally, she won a team bronze medal at the 2007 World Championships. At the junior level, she won three silver medals at the 2006 European Championships.

== Gymnastics career ==
Grigore competed at the 2006 Junior European Championships and helped Romania win the team silver medal behind Russia. Individually, she finished fifth in the all-around competition. Then in the event finals, she won the silver medal on the balance beam behind Russia's Darya Elizarova, and she won the silver medal on the floor exercise behind teammate Aluissa Lăcusteanu.

Grigore competed at the 2007 American Cup and finished 13th in the qualifier round. She then competed at the 2007 European Championships and finished eighth in the all-around during the qualification round, but she did not advance into the final due to the two-per-country rule. Additionally, she was the third reserve for the uneven bars final. She was initially the alternate for the 2007 World Championships, but she was added to the team after Anamaria Tămârjan broke her leg in training. She won a bronze medal alongside the Romanian team. After the World Championships, she competed at the Good Luck Beijing International Tournament, a preview meet for the upcoming Olympic Games. There, she placed tenth in the all-around final.

Heading into the 2008 Summer Olympics, Grigore helped Romania win a friendly meet against Great Britain, and she tied with Marissa King for fifth place in the all-around. She then represented Romania at the 2008 Summer Olympics alongside Steliana Nistor, Sandra Izbașa, Anamaria Tămârjan, Gabriela Drăgoi, and Andreea Acatrinei. She contributed scores on the vault and uneven bars to help Romania qualify for the team final in fourth place. Although Grigore did not compete in the team final, she received a bronze medal.
