= 2009 European Artistic Gymnastics Championships =

3rd Individual European Artistic Gymnastics Championships
- Location: Milan, Italy
- Dates: 29 March to 5 April 2009
- Nations: Members of the European Union of Gymnastics

The 3rd Individual European Artistic Gymnastics Championships for both men and women were held in Milan, Italy, on 29 March to 5 April 2009.

== Medal winners ==
Event	Gold	Silver	Bronze
Men
All-around	Fabian Hambuechen (GER)	Daniel Keatings (GBR)	Yuri Ryazanov (RUS)
Floor	Fabian Hambuechen (GER)	Matthias Fahrig (GER)	Eleftherios Kosmidis (GRE); Alexander Shatilov (ISR)
Pommel horse	Krisztián Berki (HUN)	Louis Smith (GBR)	Daniel Keatings (GBR)
Rings	Yuri van Gelder (NED)	Olexandr Vorobiov (UKR)	Yordan Yovchev (BUL)
Vault	Thomas Bouhail (FRA)	Flavius Koczi (ROU)	Matthias Fahrig (GER)
Parallel bars	Yann Cucherat (FRA)	Mitja Petkovšek (SLO)	Fabian Hambuechen (GER)
Horizontal bar	Vlasios Maras (GRE)	Yann Cucherat (FRA)	Mykola Kuksenkov (UKR)
Women
All-around	Ksenia Semenova (RUS)	Ksenia Afanasyeva (RUS)	Ariella Käslin (SUI)
Vault	Ariella Käslin (SUI)	Yulia Berger (RUS)	Anna Kalashnyk (UKR)
Uneven bars	Beth Tweddle (GBR)	Ksenia Semenova (RUS)	Anja Brinker (GER)
Balance beam	Yana Demyanchuk (UKR)	Anamaria Tămârjan (ROU)	Gabriela Drăgoi (ROU)
Floor	Beth Tweddle (GBR)	Vanessa Ferrari (ITA)	Ksenia Semenova (RUS)

== Men's ==
=== Individual all-around ===
Position	Gymnast	Floor (gymnastics)	Pommel horse	Rings (gymnastics)	Vault (gymnastics)	Parallel bars	Horizontal bar	Total
1st place, gold medalist(s)	Fabian Hambüchen (GER)	15.500	13.850	14.750	16.025	14.225	14.825	89.175
2nd place, silver medalist(s)	Daniel Keatings (GBR)	14.475	15.475	13.425	15.550	15.000	14.350	88.275
3rd place, bronze medalist(s)	Yuri Ryazanov (RUS)	14.375	14.575	14.625	15.000	14.775	14.850	88.200
4	Philipp Boy (GER)	14.600	13.875	13.825	14.975	14.350	15.200	86.825
5	Flavius Koczi (ROU)	14.300	13.575	13.225	16.475	14.625	14.575	86.775
6	Enrico Pozzo (ITA)	14.800	13.575	13.400	15.600	14.125	14.900	86.400
7	Daniel Purvis (GBR)	14.850	13.825	13.575	15.650	14.600	13.575	86.075
8	Alexander Shatilov (ISR)	14.475	13.675	13.625	15.675	14.350	14.150	85.950
9	Niki Böschenstein (SUI)	13.975	13.250	14.125	15.775	14.825	13.800	85.750
10	Hamilton Sabot (FRA)	14.025	13.200	14.175	14.650	14.625	14.450	85.125
11	Vahagn Stepanyan (ARM)	14.100	13.950	14.225	14.850	14.375	13.100	84.600
12	Manuel Campos (POR)	14.300	13.850	13.775	15.150	14.550	12.950	84.575
13	Samuel Piasecký (SVK)	13.700	13.700	12.775	15.425	14.850	13.950	84.400
14	Sami Aalto (FIN)	13.850	13.550	13.900	15.550	13.550	13.600	84.000
15	Dimitrios Markousis (GRE)	15.050	11.600	13.950	15.550	13.925	13.475	83.550
16	Artsiom Bykau (BLR)	13.875	13.225	13.725	15.450	13.525	13.725	83.525
17	Benoît Caranobe (FRA)	14.300	10.900	14.125	15.075	14.575	14.175	83.150
18	Christos Lympanovnos (GRE)	13.250	13.025	13.550	15.475	13.775	13.750	82.825
19	Helge Vammen (DEN)	13.775	13.175	13.100	15.075	13.675	13.650	82.450
20	Dzmitry Savitski (BLR)	13.475	12.825	12.500	14.875	15.025	13.600	82.300
21	Jeffrey Wammes (NED)	14.400	11.250	12.700	16.150	12.975	14.600	82.075
22	Marius Berbecar (ROU)	13.550	13.150	13.575	15.200	13.250	13.025	81.750
23	Gustavo Simoes (POR)	14.175	12.975	13.750	15.125	12.325	12.250	80.600
24	Sergio Muñoz (ESP)	14.025	10.575	13.675	15.950	13.675	11.375	79.275

=== Finals ===
==== Floor ====
Position	Gymnast	D Score	E Score	Penalty	Total
1st place, gold medalist(s)	Fabian Hambüchen (GER)	6.3	9.150		15.450
2nd place, silver medalist(s)	Matthias Fahrig (GER)	6.4	9.000		15.400
3rd place, bronze medalist(s)	Elefterios Kosmidis (GRE)	6.5	8.850		15.350
3rd place, bronze medalist(s)	Alexander Shatilov (ISR)	6.3	9.050		15.350
5	Anton Golotsutskov (RUS)	6.2	9.000		15.200
6	Oleksandr Yakubovsky (UKR)	6.2	8.875		15.075
7	Enrico Pozzo (ITA)	6.1	8.925	0.1	14.925
8	Eddie Penev (BUL)	5.9	8.525		14.425

==== Pommel horse ====
Position	Gymnast	D Score	E Score	Penalty	Total
1st place, gold medalist(s)	Krisztián Berki (HUN)	6.7	8.900		15.600
2nd place, silver medalist(s)	Louis Smith (GBR)	6.5	9.050		15.550
3rd place, bronze medalist(s)	Daniel Keatings (GBR)	6.5	9.000		15.500
4	Andrey Perevoznikov (RUS)	6.6	8.600		15.200
5	Alberto Busnari (ITA)	6.4	8.775		15.175
6	Donna-Donny Truyens (BEL)	6.7	7.850		14.550
7	Ilie Daniel Popescu (ROU)	6.4	7.125		13.525
8	Sašo Bertoncelj (SLO)	6.0	7.150		13.150

==== Rings ====
Position	Gymnast	D Score	E Score	Penalty	Total
1st place, gold medalist(s)	Yuri van Gelder (NED)	6.6	9.150		15.750
2nd place, silver medalist(s)	Oleksandr Vorobiov (UKR)	6.8	8.800		15.600
3rd place, bronze medalist(s)	Yordan Yovchev (BUL)	6.7	8.850		15.550
4	Matteo Morandi (ITA)	6.7	8.825		15.525
5	Daniel Pinheiro (FRA)	7.0	8.425		15.425
6	Konstantin Pluzhnikov (RUS)	6.6	8.725		15.325
7	Matteo Angioletti (ITA)	6.6	8.675		15.275
8	Dimosthenis Tampakos (GRE)	6.7	8.275		14.975

==== Vault ====
Position	Gymnast	D Score	E Score	Penalty	Score 1	D Score	E Score	Penalty	Score 2	Total
Position	Gymnast	Vault 1				Vault 2				Total
1st place, gold medalist(s)	Thomas Bouhail (FRA)	7.0	9.275		16.275	7.0	9.375		16.375	16.325
2nd place, silver medalist(s)	Flavius Koczi (ROU)	7.0	9.300		16.300	7.0	9.325		16.325	16.312
3rd place, bronze medalist(s)	Matthias Fahrig (GER)	7.0	9.400		16.400	6.6	9.450		16.050	16.225
4	Marek Lyszczarz (POL)	6.6	9.375		15.975	6.6	9.300		15.900	15.937
5	Ilie Daniel Popescu (ROU)	7.0	9.325	0.1	16.225	7.0	8.900	0.3	15.600	15.912
6	Jeffrey Wammes (NED)	6.6	9.325	0.1	15.825	6.6	9.275		15.875	15.850
7	Fabian Hambüchen (GER)	6.6	9.300	0.1	15.800	6.2	9.325		15.525	15.662
8	Dimitri Kaspiarovich (BLR)	6.6	8.225		14.825	0.0	0.000		0.000	7.412

==== Parallel bars ====
Position	Gymnast	D Score	E Score	Penalty	Total
1st place, gold medalist(s)	Yann Cucherat (FRA)	6.5	9.325		15.825
2nd place, silver medalist(s)	Mitja Petkovšek (SLO)	6.5	9.300		15.800
3rd place, bronze medalist(s)	Fabian Hambüchen (GER)	6.5	8.875		15.375
4	Adam Kierzkowski (POL)	6.0	9.100		15.100
5	Samuel Piasecký (SVK)	6.2	8.875		15.075
5	Cosmin Popescu (ROU)	6.2	8.875		15.075
7	Daniel Keatings (GBR)	6.0	9.000		15.000
8	Niki Böschenstein (SUI)	6.0	8.175		14.175

==== Horizontal bar ====
Position	Gymnast	D Score	E Score	Penalty	Total
1st place, gold medalist(s)	Vlasios Maras (GRE)	6.700	8.675		15.375
2nd place, silver medalist(s)	Yann Cucherat (FRA)	6.700	8.550		15.250
3rd place, bronze medalist(s)	Mykola Kuksenkov (UKR)	6.400	8.525		14.925
4	Aliaksandr Tsarevich (BLR)	6.400	8.425		14.825
5	Epke Zonderland (NED)	7.000	7.575		14.575
6	Martin Konečný (CZE)	6.700	7.800		14.500
7	Jeffrey Wammes (NED)	6.000	8.025		14.025
8	Igor Cassina (ITA)	3.600	7.275		10.875

== Women's ==
=== Individual all-around ===
Position	Gymnast	Vault (gymnastics)	Uneven bars	Balance beam	Floor (gymnastics)	Total
1st place, gold medalist(s)	Ksenia Semenova (RUS)	14.225	14.925	14.800	14.225	58.175
2nd place, silver medalist(s)	Ksenia Afanasyeva (RUS)	14.525	14.925	13.575	14.575	57.600
3rd place, bronze medalist(s)	Ariella Käslin (SUI)	15.300	13.975	14.300	13.700	57.275
4	Ana María Izurieta (ESP)	14.850	13.175	14.300	14.000	56.325
5	Anamaria Tămârjan (ROM)	14.650	13.975	14.600	12.700	55.925
6	Aagje Vanwalleghem (BEL)	14.200	14.125	13.675	13.900	55.900
7	Marine Petit (FRA)	14.150	13.650	13.800	14.000	55.600
8	Anja Brinker (GER)	13.650	15.000	13.250	13.525	55.425
9	Vanessa Ferrari (ITA)	12.700	13.875	14.075	14.525	55.175
10	Marta Pihan-Kulesza (POL)	13.600	14.200	13.650	13.700	55.150
11	Becky Downie (GBR)	14.325	15.000	11.700	14.050	55.075
12	Yana Demyanchuk (UKR)	13.625	13.700	14.500	13.175	55.000
13	Yasmin Zimmermann (SUI)	14.100	12.925	13.500	14.000	54.525
14	Diana Chelaru (ROM)	14.675	13.525	11.900	14.400	54.500
15	Mayra Kroonen (NED)	13.975	13.500	13.325	13.675	54.475
16	Kim Bùi (GER)	14.150	14.400	11.575	14.250	54.375
17	Hannah Whelan (GBR)	13.550	13.925	13.750	13.100	54.325
18	Valentyna Holenkova (UKR)	13.600	14.400	13.325	12.825	54.150
19	Youna Dufournet (FRA)	13.700	13.700	13.875	11.750	53.025
20	Valeriia Maksiuta (ISR)	14.025	11.800	13.725	13.275	52.825
21	Wyomi Masela (NED)	14.050	12.525	12.450	13.000	52.675
22	Naomi Ruíz (ESP)	14.250	10.650	13.050	13.650	51.600
23	Laura Gombás (HUN)	13.400	10.050	11.175	13.075	47.700
24	Emily Armi (ITA)	13.625	2.000	12.925	13.825	42.375

=== Finals ===
==== Vault ====
Position	Gymnast	D Score	E Score	Penalty	Score 1	D Score	E Score	Penalty	Score 2	Total
Position	Gymnast	Vault 1				Vault 2				Total
1st place, gold medalist(s)	Ariella Käslin (SUI)	6.3	8.825		15.125	5.3	8.925	0.1	14.125	14.625
2nd place, silver medalist(s)	Yulia Berger (RUS)	5.5	8.925		14.425	5.7	8.525		14.225	14.325
3rd place, bronze medalist(s)	Anna Kalashnyk (UKR)	5.8	8.875		14.675	5.0	8.875		13.875	14.275
4	Aagje Vanwalleghem (BEL)	5.3	9.200	0.1	14.400	5.2	8.800		14.000	14.200
5	Kim Bùi (GER)	5.4	8.700		14.100	5.3	8.900		14.200	14.150
6	Becky Downie (GBR)	5.8	8.625		14.425	4.8	8.825		13.625	14.025
7	Wyomi Masela (NED)	5.3	8.800		14.100	5.0	8.800		13.800	13.950
8	Jana Komrsková (CZE)	5.2	9.125		14.325	5.0	8.525	0.1	13.425	13.875

==== Uneven bars ====
Position	Gymnast	D Score	E Score	Penalty	Total
1st place, gold medalist(s)	Beth Tweddle (GBR)	6.7	8.875		15.575
2nd place, silver medalist(s)	Ksenia Semenova (RUS)	6.5	9.000		15.500
3rd place, bronze medalist(s)	Anja Brinker (GER)	6.0	8.800		14.800
4	Ksenia Afanasyeva (RUS)	6.1	8.550		14.650
4	Youna Dufournet (FRA)	6.1	8.550		14.650
6	Becky Downie (GBR)	6.1	8.425		14.525
7	Anastasia Koval (UKR)	6.0	8.350		14.350
8	Valentyna Holenkova (UKR)	5.2	7.500		12.700

==== Balance beam ====
Position	Gymnast	D Score	E Score	Penalty	Total
1st place, gold medalist(s)	Yana Demyanchuk (UKR)	5.9	8.875		14.775
2nd place, silver medalist(s)	Anamaria Tămârjan (ROU)	6.0	8.750		14.750
3rd place, bronze medalist(s)	Gabriela Drăgoi (ROU)	5.9	8.750		14.650
4	Marine Petit (FRA)	5.5	8.650		14.150
5	Ksenia Semenova (RUS)	5.7	8.425		14.125
6	Valeriia Maksiuta (ISR)	5.7	8.075		13.725
7	Vasiliki Millousi (GRE)	5.9	7.550		13.450
8	Yasmin Zimmermann (SUI)	5.5	7.350		12.850

==== Floor ====
Position	Gymnast	D Score	E Score	Penalty	Total
1st place, gold medalist(s)	Beth Tweddle (GBR)	6.0	9.150		15.150
2nd place, silver medalist(s)	Vanessa Ferrari (ITA)	5.4	9.275		14.675
3rd place, bronze medalist(s)	Ksenia Semenova (RUS)	5.4	9.225		14.625
4	Ana María Izurieta (ESP)	5.4	8.675		14.075
4	Anamaria Tămârjan (ROU)	5.5	8.675	0.1	14.075
6	Valentyna Holenkova (UKR)	5.1	8.825		13.925
7	Sandra Izbașa (ROM)	4.9	9.000		13.900
8	Lia Parolari (ITA)	4.8	8.725		13.525

== Medal count ==
=== Men ===
Rank	Nation	Gold	Silver	Bronze	Total
1	Germany	2	1	2	5
2	France	2	1	0	3
3	Greece	1	0	1	2
4	Hungary	1	0	0	1
4	Netherlands	1	0	0	1
6	Great Britain	0	2	1	3
7	Ukraine	0	1	1	2
8	Romania	0	1	0	1
8	Slovenia	0	1	0	1
10	Bulgaria	0	0	1	1
10	Israel	0	0	1	1
10	Russia	0	0	1	1
Totals (12 entries)		7	7	8	22

=== Women ===
Rank	Nation	Gold	Silver	Bronze	Total
1	Great Britain	2	0	0	2
2	Russia	1	3	1	5
3	Switzerland	1	0	1	2
3	Ukraine	1	0	1	2
5	Romania	0	1	1	2
6	Italy	0	1	0	1
7	Germany	0	0	1	1
Totals (7 entries)		5	5	5	15

=== Overall ===
Rank	Nation	Gold	Silver	Bronze	Total
1	Great Britain	2	2	1	5
2	Germany	2	1	3	6
3	France	2	1	0	3
4	Russia	1	3	2	6
5	Ukraine	1	1	2	4
6	Greece	1	0	1	2
6	Switzerland	1	0	1	2
8	Hungary	1	0	0	1
8	Netherlands	1	0	0	1
10	Romania	0	2	1	3
11	Italy	0	1	0	1
11	Slovenia	0	1	0	1
13	Bulgaria	0	0	1	1
13	Israel	0	0	1	1
Totals (14 entries)		12	12	13	37
