= Gymnastics at the 2003 European Youth Summer Olympic Festival =

- Venue: Charléty Stadium
- Location: (France) Paris
- Dates: 29 July - 1 August 2003

Gymnastics at the 2003 European Youth Summer Olympic Festival (EYOF) was held from 29 July to 1 August 2003. The competitions took place at the Charléty Stadium in Paris, France.

== Medal summary ==
=== Medal table ===
==== Overall ====
Rank	Nation	Gold	Silver	Bronze	Total
1	Italy	2	1	0	3
1	Ukraine	2	1	0	3
3	Russia	2	0	3	5
4	Netherlands	0	3	2	5
5	Spain	0	1	0	1
6	Romania	0	0	1	1
Totals (6 entries)		6	6	6	18

=== Medal events ===
==== Girls ====
Event	Gold	Silver	Bronze
Team all-around	Ukraine	Netherlands	Russia
Individual all-around	Yulia Lozhechko; Russia	Dariya Zgoba; Ukraine	Svetlana Klyukina; Russia
Vault	Giorgia Benecchi; Italy	Loes Linders; Netherlands	Mayra Kroonen; Netherlands
Uneven bars	Dariya Zgoba; Ukraine	Giorgia Benecchi; Italy	Shalina Groenveld; Netherlands
Balance beam	Yulia Lozhechko; Russia	Loes Linders; Netherlands	Stancu Lorena; Romania
Floor	Giorgia Benecchi; Italy	Melodi Pulgarin; Spain	Yulia Lozhechko; Russia

== See also ==
- European Youth Olympic Festival
