= Gymnastics at the 2008 Summer Olympics – Women's uneven bars =

Olympic gymnastics event

Women's uneven bars at the Games of the XXIX Olympiad
- Venue: Beijing National Indoor Stadium
- Dates: 10 August 2008 (qualifying); 18 August 2008 (final)
- Competitors: 84 from 34 nations
- Winning score: 16.725

Medalists
1st place, gold medalist(s)		He Kexin	China
2nd place, silver medalist(s)		Nastia Liukin	United States
3rd place, bronze medalist(s)		Yang Yilin	China

Women's uneven bars competition at the 2008 Summer Olympics was held on August 18 at the Beijing National Indoor Stadium.

The eight competitors (with a maximum of two per nation) with the highest scores in qualifying proceeded to the women's uneven bars finals. There, each gymnast performed again; the scores from the final round (ignoring qualification) determined final ranking.

== Final ==
The final scores work as per the normal scoring procedure: the D score measures the difficulty of the routine and the E score measures how well it was executed. The E score has a maximum of 10.000 and is reduced for each deduction (for every error in the performance).

Position	Gymnast	Country	D Score	E Score	Penalty	Total
Gold medal	He Kexin	China	7.700	9.025		16.725
Silver medal	Nastia Liukin	United States	7.700	9.025		16.725
Bronze medal	Yang Yilin	China	7.700	8.950		16.650
4	Beth Tweddle	Great Britain	7.800	8.825		16.625
5	Anastasia Koval	Ukraine	7.300	9.075		16.375
6	Ksenia Semenova	Russia	7.400	8.925		16.325
7	Steliana Nistor	Romania	7.000	8.575		15.575
8	Dariya Zgoba	Ukraine	7.100	7.875	0.100	14.875

=== Tiebreaker ===
During the uneven bar finals, Nastia Liukin and He Kexin had a tied score of 16.725, which was followed by a tiebreaking procedure. In this procedure there are six judges who judge each competitor on a scale of 1-10. When all six scores are finalised, the highest and lowest are eliminated and the remaining four are averaged. The first tiebreaking procedure is determined by the E score, the execution score. Since Liukin and He tied with an E score of 9.025, the second tiebreaking procedure was required to determine a winner. In this event, the lowest score given to each competitor is dropped. Before this, the remaining scores were:

	1	2	3	4	Average
Nastia Liukin	9.1	9.0			9.025
He Kexin	9.1		9.0	8.9	9.025

When the next lowest scores were deducted, the averages became:

	1	2	3	4	Average
Nastia Liukin	9.1	9.0		9.0	9.033
He Kexin	9.1		9.0	8.9	9.066

Thus, since Nastia Liukin's average was lower after the second round of score elimination, He Kexin was declared the winner.

== Qualified competitors ==
Position	Gymnast	A Score	B Score	Penalty	Total
1	Yang Yilin (CHN)	7.700	8.950		16.650
2	Ksenia Semenova (RUS)	7.400	9.075		16.475
3	Anastasia Koval (UKR)	7.300	9.025		16.325
4	Steliana Nistor (ROU)	7.300	8.675		15.975
5	Nastia Liukin (USA)	7.700	8.250		15.950
6	He Kexin (CHN)	7.500	8.225		15.725
7	Dariya Zgoba (UKR)	6.900	8.875	0.100	15.675
8	Beth Tweddle (GBR)	7.600	8.050		15.650
