= Anamaria Tămârjan =

Romanian artistic gymnast

- Alternative names: Anamaria Tămîrjan; Ana Marija Tamarjan
- Born: 8 May 1991 (age 35) Constanţa, Romania

Gymnastics career
- Discipline: Women's artistic gymnastics
- Country represented: Romania
- Gym: Deva National Training Center/CS Petrolul Ploieşti
- Head coach: Nicolae Forminte
- Former coaches: Camelia Rădulescu, Gabriela Tavaru, Doina Olaru
Medal record
Representing Romania
Olympic Games
Bronze medal – third place	2008 Beijing	Team
European Championships
Gold medal – first place	2008 Clermont	Team
Silver medal – second place	2009 Milan	Balance Beam
Bronze medal – third place	2008 Clermont	Floor

Anamaria "Ana" Tămârjan (also spelled Tămîrjan, born 8 May 1991) is a Romanian artistic gymnast. She is a bronze Olympic medalist and a gold European medalist with the team. Individually, she is a European silver medalist on balance beam and a bronze medalist on floor. Her favorite events are the floor and the balance beam.

== Early life and career ==
She is an identical twin; her sister Adriana was also a world-class gymnast and a member of the Romanian national team, but she is now retired. Tămârjan began training in gymnastics at the age of 4 in Ploieşti with coach Camelia Rădulescu. She moved to the junior national training center in Oneşti at the age of 12 and was invited to the Deva National Training Center a few years later. During her junior career she competed at Siska Gym International (2006) where she tied for silver on floor with Ekaterina Kramarenko and placed seventh all around. She ranked sixth all around at the 2006 Romanian nationals. Although a member of the junior national team, she missed the 2006 European Championships with an elbow injury.

== Senior career ==
Tămârjan was a member of the Romanian team at the 2007 World Championships, but was replaced by alternate Andreea Grigore. She was training on the uneven bars before the competition and she slipped from the bar and broke her leg. She also missed the 2008 Romanian national championships with an injury. However, she had a good meet at the 2008 European Championships in Clermont-Ferrand, France, winning the gold medal with the team and the bronze medal on floor.

She was selected alongside Sandra Izbaşa, Steliana Nistor, Andreea Grigore, Andreea Acatrinei and Gabriela Drăgoi to be a member of the Romanian team at the 2008 Olympic Games. Here she helped her team to qualify in the fourth position in the team finals by competing on all four events vault (15.025) uneven bars (14.275), beam (15.200), and on floor (14.500). In the team final event she supported the team to win the bronze medal by improving all the scores obtained in the preliminaries: vault (15.125) uneven bars (14.425), beam (15.425), and floor (14.950). She also placed 16th in the qualification for the all around but she did not compete in the finals due to the two per country rule.

Struggling with health problems she was not at her full physical potential at the 2009 European Championships. However, she managed to qualify second all around, second on beam and fifth on floor. She failed to medal in the all around event due to a fall during the floor exercise. She placed fifth all around, won silver on balance beam and placed fourth on floor. Later that year she competed at the 2009 World Championships where she qualified only in the all around final. She ended her second world championships experience by placing ninth all around. After her return to Romania she underwent surgery to both knees with little chances of making a comeback at the 2010 European Championships. Due to health problems she retired in June 2010. She enrolled the Faculty of Physical Education and Sports in Bucharest.
