= Steliana Nistor =

Romanian artistic gymnast

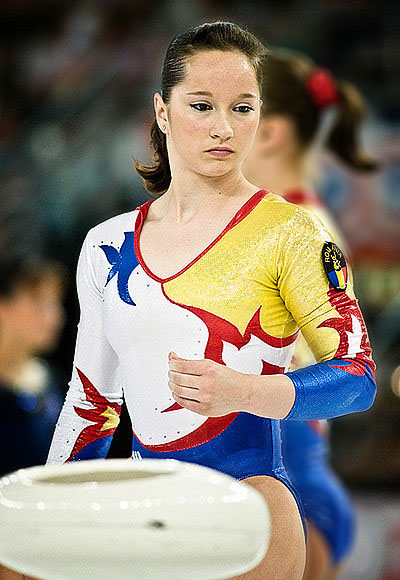
- Nistor in 2008

Personal information
- Nicknames: Stela, Steliata
- Born: 15 September 1989 (age 36) Sibiu
- Height: 149 cm (4 ft 11 in)

Gymnastics career
- Discipline: Women's artistic gymnastics
- Country represented: Romania; (2002–08 (ROU))
- Club: C.S.S. SIBIU
- Head coach: Nicolae Forminte
- Assistant coaches: Lucian Sandu, Liliana Cozma
- Former coaches: Mihaela Stănuleţ, Raluca Bugner, Octavian Serban, Livia Ponoran
- Music: "Happy Valley" by Vanessa Mae
- Retired: 2008
Medal record
Representing Romania
Olympic Games
Bronze medal – third place	2008 Beijing	Team
World Championships
Silver medal – second place	2007 Stuttgart	All-Around
Silver medal – second place	2007 Stuttgart	Balance Beam
Bronze medal – third place	2007 Stuttgart	Team
European Championships
Gold medal – first place	2008 Clermont	Team
Silver medal – second place	2006 Volos	Team
Silver medal – second place	2007 Amsterdam	Uneven Bars
Silver medal – second place	2008 Clermont	Uneven Bars
Bronze medal – third place	2007 Amsterdam	Balance Beam

Steliana Nistor (born 15 September 1989) is a Romanian former artistic gymnast. She was a key member of the Romanian team between 2006 and 2008, where she helped Romania win team bronze medals at the 2007 World Championships and the 2008 Olympics. Individually, she is the 2007 world all-around and beam silver medalist, the 2007 and 2008 European silver medalist on the uneven bars and the 2007 bronze medalist on the balance beam.

== Personal life ==
Steliana Nistor's parents Steliana Dovlecel and Dumitru Nistor divorced in 2002. She has two brothers named Bogdan and Marian and a half-brother.

She has stated to have enjoyed her time training at the Deva gymnastics camp, in comparison to a tumultuous home life.

She married Constantin Popescu in Târgu Jiu, Romania, on November 25, 2023, his birthday.

== Youth and junior career ==
Steliana began gymnastics at the age of five, at the gymnastics club CSS Sibiu, coached by former Olympic champion Mihaela Stănuleţ, and Raluca Bugner (since 1998).

In 1998, she placed first in the team event at the Gala International de gymnastique de Thorigne, an invitational friendly held in Thorigné-Fouillard, France. In 2001, Steliana Nistor competed in the Romanian championships, where she won the junior all-around title, gold on uneven bars and balance beam, and bronze on the floor exercise.

She joined the junior Romanian national team in 2002. In 2004, she won the junior all-around title again at the Romanian Championships. At the 2004 European Junior Championships in Amsterdam, Netherlands, she won gold in the all-around with a score of 37.587, ahead of Italian gymnast Vanessa Ferrari. She also won gold on floor and silver on vault and in the team event. Her final competition as a junior was at the Chunichi Cup in Nagoya, Japan, where she won gold in the all-around.

== Senior career ==
=== 2005−2006 ===
In 2005, Nistor was selected as a member of the Romanian senior national artistic gymnastics team. However, she was unable to compete in 2005 due to back and knee injuries.

She returned to international competitions in 2006, starting at the Cottbus World Cup where she finished sixth in the beam finals. At the European Championships in Volos, Greece, she won silver with the team and only competed on uneven bars in the apparatus events, where she finished sixth. She resumed competing in the all-around at the Romanian Championships that year where she won silver behind Sandra Izbaşa.

Steliana was also a member of the national team competing for the 2006 World Championships in Aarhus, Denmark. According to the team's coach, Nicolae Forminte, the 2006 team was Romania's most inexperienced generation since the time of Nadia Comăneci. Of Romania's team, only Floarea Leonida had previous world championship experience. The Romanian team placed fourth in the team competition; the first time since 1981 that the Romanian team failed to medal at a world championship. She also placed fourth all-around behind her teammate Sandra Izbaşa and seventh on beam and on uneven bars.

She ended 2006 by pairing with Marian Drăgulescu for the silver medal at the Swiss Cup, and by winning gold on beam and bronze on floor at the Glasgow Grand Prix.

=== 2007 ===
At the 16th French Internationals, Nistor placed fourth on the balance beam and 6th on the floor exercise. At Romanian Internationals, she won gold on in the all-around, on uneven bars, and balance beam, and silver in the floor exercise.

At the 2007 European Championships in Amsterdam, Netherlands, Nistor placed 4th in the all-around, won silver on uneven bars, and bronze on the balance beam. This was the first time since 1998 that a Romanian gymnast (Claudia Presecan) medalled on uneven bars at a European Championship.

At the 2007 World Championships, she scored a 60.625 in the all-around and won the silver medal behind Shawn Johnson. She also won the silver on beam behind Nastia Liukin and placed sixth in the uneven bars finals. She also contributed considerably to the team bronze medal by receiving the highest average score on the Romanian team.

Besides the European and World championships she competed at various world cup events. She won the Swiss Cup mixed pair event with Flavius Koczi, medaled gold on bars and bronze on floor at the Glasgow Grand Prix and won gold on beam and floor and bronze on bars at the Ghent World Cup

=== 2008 and the Olympics ===
In 2008, she competed at the European Championships in Clermont-Ferrand, France. She qualified second and fifth on beam and uneven bars finals, respectively and placed tenth on floor and vault. She won gold in the team event, silver on the uneven bars and after a fall, she placed 6th on beam finals. A picture of her performing on the floor exercise at these European Championships appeared on the cover of May 2008 International Gymnastics Magazine.

After the European Championships, Nistor expressed a desire to possibly retire after the 2008 Beijing Olympics.

At the 2008 Romanian Championships, Nistor medaled on every event, with gold in the all-around and all apparatuses except floor exercise where she won silver. She only competed on uneven bars at a dual meet in Italy at the Mediterraneo Gym Cup the following week, citing exhaustion from the Romanian Championships coinciding with her final exams.

At the 2008 Beijing Olympics, Nistor competed on every event in women's artistic gymnastics. In the team event, she performed on every apparatus, contributing a particularly high score of 16.150 on uneven bars to the team score. She won the team bronze alongside her teammates on the Romanian team: Sandra Izbaşa, Anamaria Tămârjan, Gabriela Drăgoi, Andreea Grigore, and Andreea Acatrinei. She placed 5th in the all-around and 7th on uneven bars, both behind Ksenia Semenova.

Following the Olympic games, Nistor went back home while the other gymnasts went to Constanta for a holiday/training camp by the seaside. A few weeks later, she formally announced on television that she would be retiring.

== Retirement ==
Nistor retired from gymnastics after a history of chronic back pain, and pain in her left hand, which was diagnosed with necrosis. With little success from kinesiotherapy, she considered the possibility of going to Canada for surgery. However, this was discouraged by Octavian Bellu, Mariana Bitang, and the doctor they referred her to (Cătălin Cârstoiu). After revealing this information, Nistor's fans began fundraising efforts which caused misinformation to spread about her financial situation. Nistor requested a stop to the fundraising and has stated that she will no longer be giving interviews about the topic for fear of misrepresentation.

After retirement from gymnastics, she declined an offer by her former coach as a junior, Livia Ponoran, to coach in the United States, stating her desire to pursue her studies. She studied physical education, sports, and coaching in her hometown of Sibiu at the Faculty of Physical Education and Sports at the Lucian Blaga University of Sibiu.

After graduation she moved to Norway to work as a gymnastics coach, first at Drammen Turn club and then at Hammer Turn club in Fjellhamar. She then briefly coached in Germany before returning to Romania.

She currently works as a sports teacher near her hometown of Sibiu, Romania, first in Rășinari, then in Cisnădie.

== Skills ==
Nistor's skills included a handspring to back full on balance beam, as well as a front flip to Arabesque. On bars, she performed a toe-on reverse Hecht (called a Ray) to a Pak salto.

== Floor music ==
2006 Ritual fire dance from "El amor brujo" by Manuel de Falla

== Awards ==
- Romanian Order of Sports Merit - 3rd Class (2008)

== Competitive history ==
Junior competitive history of Steliana Nistor

Year	Event	Team	AA	VT	UB	BB	FX
1998	Gala International de gymnastique de Thorigne	1st place, gold medalist(s)					
2001	Romanian Championships		1st place, gold medalist(s)		1st place, gold medalist(s)	1st place, gold medalist(s)	3rd place, bronze medalist(s)
2004	Romanian Championships		1st place, gold medalist(s)				
2004	European Championships	2nd place, silver medalist(s)	1st place, gold medalist(s)	2nd place, silver medalist(s)			1st place, gold medalist(s)
2004	Chunichi Cup		1st place, gold medalist(s)				

Senior competitive history of Steliana Nistor

Year	Event	Team	AA	VT	UB	BB	FX
2006	Cottbus World Cup		6		19		
2006	European Championships	2nd place, silver medalist(s)			6		
2006	Romanian Championships		2nd place, silver medalist(s)				
2006	World Championships	4	4		7	7	
2006	Swiss Cup		1st place, gold medalist(s)				
2006	Glasgow Grand Prix				5	1st place, gold medalist(s)	3rd place, bronze medalist(s)
2007	French Internationals				13	4	6
2007	Romanian Internationals		1st place, gold medalist(s)		1st place, gold medalist(s)	1st place, gold medalist(s)	2nd place, silver medalist(s)
2007	European Championships		4		2nd place, silver medalist(s)	3rd place, bronze medalist(s)	5
2007	World Championships	3rd place, bronze medalist(s)	2nd place, silver medalist(s)		6	2nd place, silver medalist(s)	
2007	Swiss Cup		1st place, gold medalist(s)				
2007	Glasgow Grand Prix				1st place, gold medalist(s)	5	3rd place, bronze medalist(s)
2007	Ghent World Cup				3rd place, bronze medalist(s)	1st place, gold medalist(s)	1st place, gold medalist(s)
2008	Romanian Championships		1st place, gold medalist(s)	1st place, gold medalist(s)	1st place, gold medalist(s)	1st place, gold medalist(s)	2nd place, silver medalist(s)
2008	Mediterraneo Gym Cup	1st place, gold medalist(s)	22				
2008	European Championships	1st place, gold medalist(s)			2nd place, silver medalist(s)	6	
2008	Olympic Games	3rd place, bronze medalist(s)	5	27	7	22	24
