= Yulia Berger =

Russian artistic gymnast

- Born: 5 August 1991 (age 35) Moscow, Russia

Gymnastics career
- Discipline: Women's artistic gymnastics
- Country represented: Russia
- Head coaches: Elena Kuznetsova, Vladimir Kuznetsov
Medal record
Representing Russia
European Championships
Silver medal – second place	2009 Milan	Vault

Yulia Berger (born 5 August 1991) is an artistic gymnast. She won the silver medal on vault at the 2009 European Championships.
