= Anna Kalashnyk =

Ukrainian artistic gymnast (born 1992)

Anna Kalashnyk (born 8 December 1992) is a Ukrainian artistic gymnast. She won the bronze medal on vault at the 2009 European Championships.
