= Carlotta Giovannini =

Italian artistic gymnast

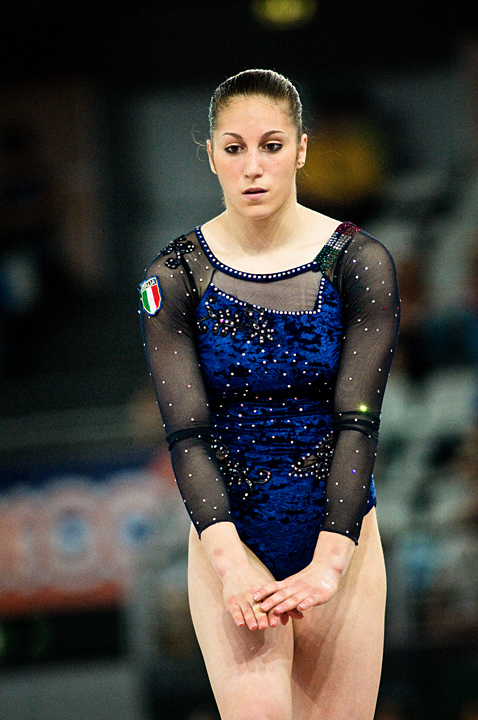

Personal information
- Born: 5 July 1990 (age 36) Castel San Pietro Terme
- Height: 157 cm (5 ft 2 in)

Gymnastics career
- Discipline: Women's artistic gymnastics
- Country represented: Italy
Medal record
Representing Italy
European Championships
Gold medal – first place	2006 Volos	Team
Gold medal – first place	2007 Amsterdam	Vault
Silver medal – second place	2008 Clermont-Ferrand	Vault

Carlotta Giovannini (born 5 July 1990) is an Italian artistic gymnast who competed at her first international competition in 2003.

== Career ==
Giovannini has had considerable success at the European Level. She was a member of the historic Gold Medal-winning Italian team at the 2006 European Championships in Volos, Greece. She followed this success by winning an individual Gold in the Vault Final at the 2007 European Championships in Amsterdam, Netherlands as well as a silver in the 2008 European Vault Final.

Giovannini competed at the 2008 Beijing Olympics as a member of the Italian Olympic Team. She progressed to the individual Vault Final, where she placed sixth.

== Eponymous skill ==
Giovanni has one eponymous uneven bars dismount listed in the Code of Points.

Apparatus	Name	Description	Difficulty (Note: Valid for the 2025–2028 Code of Points)
Uneven bars	Giovanni-Li	Swing forward with half turn to double salto forward piked	E (0.5)
