= Dariya Zgoba =

Ukrainian artistic gymnast

- Full name: Dariya Yaroslavivna Zgoba
- Alternative names: Daria, Darya, Dar'ia
- Born: 7 November 1989 (age 36) Ivano-Frankivsk, Ukrainian SSR, Soviet Union
- Height: 1.61 m (5 ft 3 in)

Gymnastics career
- Discipline: Women's artistic gymnastics
- Country represented: Ukraine
- Head coach: Oksana Khryzhnovskaya
- Retired: 2011
Medal record
Representing Ukraine
Artistic Gymnastics
European Championships
Gold medal – first place	2007 Amsterdam	Uneven bars
Bronze medal – third place	2005 Debrecen	Uneven bars
Bronze medal – third place	2008 Clermont-Ferrand	Uneven bars
Summer Universiade
Gold medal – first place	2007 Bangkok	Uneven bars
Silver medal – second place	2007 Bangkok	Team
Bronze medal – third place	2009 Belgrade	Balance beam
World Cup Final
Bronze medal – third place	2006 São Paulo	Uneven bars

Dariya Yaroslavivna Zgoba (Ukrainian: Дарина Ярославівна Згоба born 7 November 1989) is a Ukrainian retired artistic gymnast. She is the 2007 European champion and the 2005 and 2008 European bronze medalist on the uneven bars. She is the 2007 Summer Universiade uneven bars champion and team silver medalist and the 2009 Summer Universiade balance beam bronze medalist. She represented Ukraine at the 2008 Summer Olympics and finished eighth in the uneven bars final.

== Gymnastics career ==
=== 2005 ===
At the World Cup in Paris, Zgoba finished third on the uneven bars with a score of 9.375. She finished sixth in the beam final with an 8.550 Zgoba competed at the 2005 European Championships. She finished ninth in the all-around with a score of 35.274, and she won bronze on the uneven bars with a score of 9.500. At the 2005 World Championships, Zgoba scored 8.600 on bars and 8.100 on beam in the qualification round. These scores didn't qualify her into any event final.

=== 2006 ===
Zgoba competed at the World Cups in Moscow, Glasgow, and Stuttgart. In Moscow, she finished second on the uneven bars with 15.200 and fourth on beam with 14.850. In Glasgow, she won silver medals on bars and beam. In Stuttgart, she won a bronze on beam and finished eighth on bars.

At the 2006 European Championships, Zgoba finished in fifth with her team, and she finished eighth in the uneven bar final with a score of 14.225. At the 2006 World Championships, Zgoba was a part of the Ukrainian team that finished fifth. She finished 22nd in the all-around with a score of 56.925. At the World Cup Final, Zgoba finished third on the uneven bars with a score of 15.150.

=== 2007 ===
Zgoba competed at the World Cup in Paris where she won silver on bars and finished seventh on beam. At the World Cup in Ghent she won a silver on bars and a bronze on beam. At the 2006 European Championships Zgoba finished eleventh in the all-around with a score of 56.025. She won the gold medal on bars with 15.775. At the World Cup in Shanghai she won silver on bars and bronze on beam. Zgoba competed at the 2007 Summer Universiade where she won a silver medal with her team and gold on the uneven bars. At the 2007 World Championships, Zgoba was 30th in the all-around and 9th on the uneven bars during the qualification round, and she did not qualify for any event finals.

=== 2008 ===
At the 2008 European Championships, Zgoba finished fifth with her team. She won a bronze on the uneven bars with a score of 15.625.

==== Beijing Olympics ====
Zgoba represented Ukraine at the 2008 Summer Olympics. The team finished in eleventh in the qualification round, and Ukraine did not advance into the team final. Zgoba finished eighth in the uneven bars final with a score of 14.875, after coming off the bars during the routine.

=== After Beijing ===
Zgoba competed at the 2009 Summer Universiade in Belgrade, Serbia, where she won bronze on the beam.

Zgoba retired from gymnastics in 2011.

== Personal life ==
Zgoba married Oleg Zaiats in 2012. She has an older sister named Katya.

== Eponymous skill ==
Zgoba has one eponymous skill listed in the Code of Points.

Apparatus	Name	Description	Difficulty (Note: Valid for the 2025–2028 Code of Points)
Uneven bars	Zgoba	Clear pike circle backward on low bar with hecht flight to hang on high bar	C (0.3)

== See also ==
- List of Olympic female gymnasts for Ukraine
