= Anastasia Koval =

Ukrainian artistic gymnast (born 1992)

- Born: 6 November 1992 (age 33) Kyiv, Ukraine

Gymnastics career
- Discipline: Women's artistic gymnastics
- Country represented: Ukraine
- Head coach: Inna Korobchinskaya
Medal record
Universiade
Silver medal – second place	2011 Shenzhen	Team competition
European Youth Olympic Festival
Gold medal – first place	2007 Belgrade	Team competition

Anastasia Koval (Ukrainian: Анастасія Коваль; born 6 November 1992 in Kyiv) is a Ukrainian artistic gymnast. She was a member of the 2007 Ukrainian world team and competed at the 2007 World Artistic Gymnastics Championships. She also competed at the 2008 Summer Olympics in the team and uneven bars individual events.

== Competitive highlights ==
- 2007 World Artistic Gymnastics Championships team competition - 9th
- Gymnastics at the 2008 Summer Olympics – Women's uneven bars - 5th (16.375)
- 2008 FIG Artistic Gymnastics World Cup – Women's uneven bars - 6th (13.625)

== See also ==
- List of Olympic female gymnasts for Ukraine
