= Ariella Käslin =

Swiss artistic gymnast (born 1987)

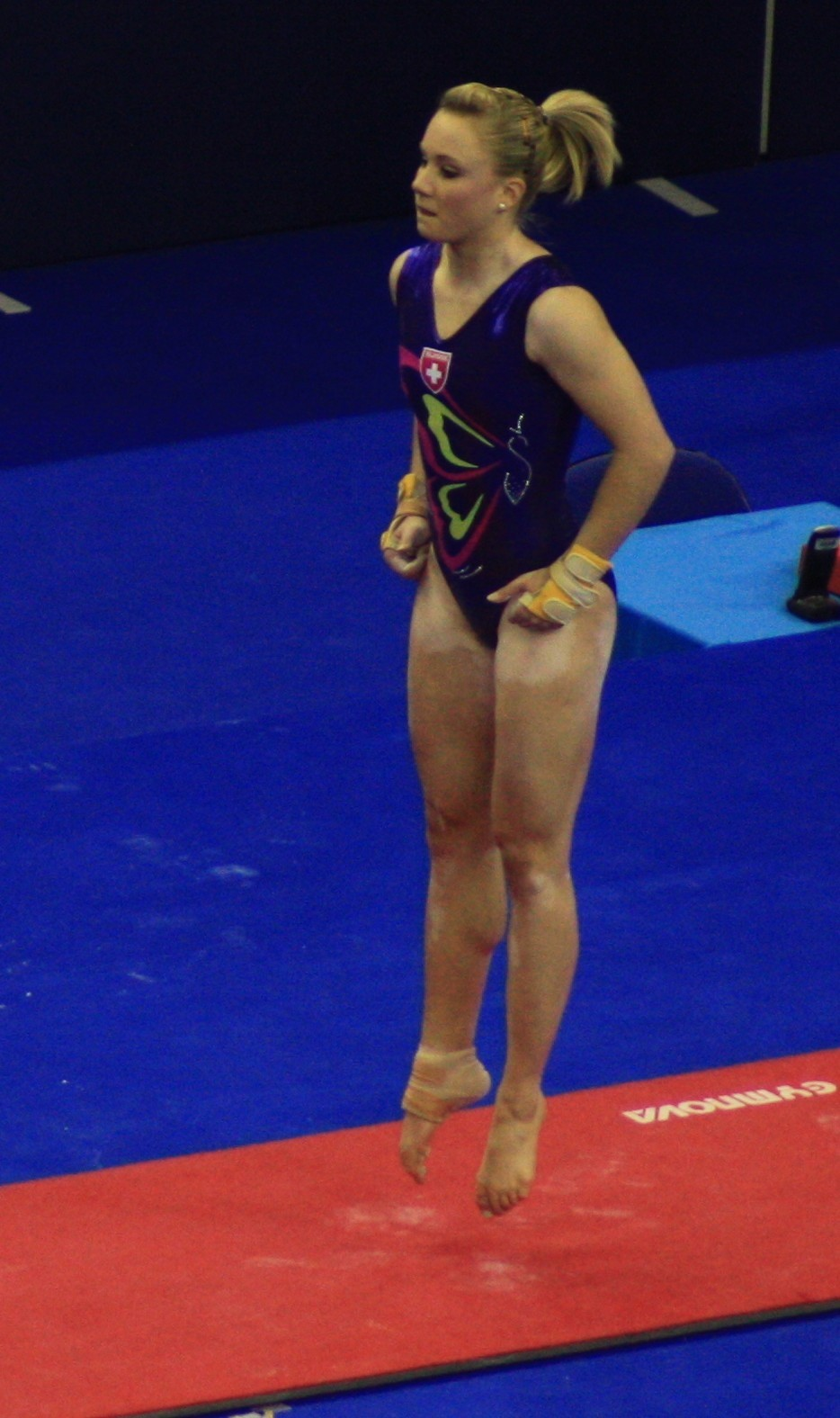
- Käslin at the 2009 World Championships

Personal information
- Full name: Ariella Käslin
- Born: 11 October 1987 (age 38) Lucerne, Switzerland

Gymnastics career
- Discipline: Women's artistic gymnastics
- Country represented: Switzerland
- Club: BTV Luzern
- Head coaches: Zoltan Jordanov, Snejana Jordanova
- Choreographer: Pascale Grossenbacher
- Retired: 11 July 2011
Medal record
Representing Switzerland
World Championships
Silver medal – second place	2009 London	Vault
World Cup Final
Silver medal – second place	2008 Madrid	Vault
European Championships
Gold medal – first place	2009 Milan	Vault
Bronze medal – third place	2009 Milan	All-Around
Bronze medal – third place	2011 Berlin	Vault

Ariella Käslin (anglicised Kaeslin; born 11 October 1987) is a Swiss former artistic gymnast. She won all five gold medals at the 2007 Swiss National Championships, represented Switzerland at the World Championships in 2007, 2006 and 2005, and was a medalist on the World Cup circuit. Käslin represented Switzerland at the 2008 Olympics, where she placed 18th in the individual all-around final and 5th in the vault event final.

== Gymnastics career ==
Käslin organized a training boycott in 2007 with three of her teammates due to abusive behavior from the national coach at the time.

In 2008, 2009 and 2010, Käslin was voted by the Swiss public as "Swiss Sportswoman of the Year"; only cyclist Tony Rominger (1992, 1993, 1994) had previously achieved three consecutive "Sportsman of the Year" awards in Switzerland.

In 2009, she became European Champion on the vault, as well as taking home a bronze medal in the all-around final. She then followed up this success with a silver medal on the vault at the 2009 World Championships.

On 11 July 2011, Käslin announced her retirement from competition.

== Personal life ==
Käslin was one of eight gymnasts quoted by name in the Magglingen Protocols, where she discussed abuse she had experienced as a gymnast.

In April 2021, Käslin came out as a lesbian. Regarding her decision to come out publicly, she remarked: "I then understood that as a public figure, I also had to come out publicly, otherwise I would never be able to live my love for a woman in complete freedom. But I'm also scared."
