= Svetlana Klyukina =

Russian artistic gymnast

- Full name: Svetlana Alekseevna Klyukina
- Born: February 10, 1989 (age 37) Severodvinsk, Russian SSR
- Height: 1.52 m (5 ft 0 in)

Gymnastics career
- Discipline: Women's artistic gymnastics
- Country represented: Russia
- Club: Dynamo Moscow
- Head coach: Tatiana Gesikova
- Choreographer: Galina Gribkova
- Retired: 2009
Medal record
Representing Russia
World Championships
Bronze medal – third place	2006 Aarhus	Team
European Championships
Silver medal – second place	2008 Clermont	Team
Summer Universiade
Silver medal – second place	2009 Belgrade	Team

Svetlana Alekseevna Klyukina (Russian: Светлана Алексеевна Клюкина; born February 10, 1989, in Severodvinsk) is a Russian artistic gymnast. She competed at the 2006 and 2007 World Artistic Gymnastics Championships as well as at the 2008 Summer Olympics in Beijing for Russia. She earned a bronze medal with the team at the 2006 World Artistic Gymnastics Championships.

== Competitive history ==
Year	Event	Team	AA	VT	UB	BB	FX
2006	World Championships	3rd					
2007	World Championships	8th					
2008	European Championships	2nd					
2008	Olympic Games	4th					

Year	Competition Description	Location	Apparatus	Rank-Final	Score-Final	Rank-Qualifying	Score-Qualifying
2008	Olympic Games	Beijing	Team	4	180.625	3	244.400
2008	Olympic Games	Beijing	Uneven Bars			18	14.975
2008	Olympic Games	Beijing	Floor Exercise			53	13.950
2008	European Championships	Clermont-Ferrand	Team	2	179.475	2	176.425
2008	European Championships	Clermont-Ferrand	Unevne Bars			13	14.600
2007	World Championships	Stuttgart	Team	8	164.525	4	238.000
2007	World Championships	Stuttgart	All-Around			24	57.200
2007	World Championships	Stuttgart	Unevne Bars			20	15.075
2007	World Championships	Stuttgart	Balance Beam			20	15.075
2007	World Championships	Stuttgart	Floor Exercise			135	12.400
2006	World Championships	Aarhus	Team	3	177.325	4	234.800
2006	World Championships	Aarhus	Uneven Bars			24	14.675
2006	World Championships	Aarhus	Balance Beam			9	15.325
2006	World Championships	Aarhus	Floor Exercise			17	14.625

== See also ==
- List of Olympic female gymnasts for Russia
