= Laetitia Dugain =

French artistic gymnast (born 1992)

Laetitia Dugain (born 27 November 1992 in Annecy) is a French former artistic gymnast. She competed at the 2008 Summer Olympics.
