= Andreea Acatrinei =

Romanian gymnast (born 1992)

- Full name: Andreea Roxana Acatrinei
- Nickname: Aca
- Born: 7 April 1992 (age 34) Braşov
- Height: 147 cm (4 ft 10 in)

Gymnastics career
- Discipline: Women's artistic gymnastics
- Country represented: Romania
- Head coach: Nicolae Forminte
- Assistant coaches: Liliana Cosma, Lucian Sandu, Raluca Bugner
- Former coaches: Ipate Mihai, Alina Stefanescu
- Choreographer: Puia Valer
Medal record
Olympic Games
Bronze medal – third place	2008 Beijing	Team
European Youth Olympic Festival
Bronze medal – third place	2007 Belgrade	Team
Bronze medal – third place	2007 Belgrade	All-around

Andreea Roxana Acatrinei (born 7 April 1992) is a Romanian artistic gymnast. She won a bronze medal with the Romanian team at the 2008 Summer Olympics.
