= Marine Petit =

French artistic gymnast

- Born: 15 November 1992 (age 33) Saint-Vallier, Saône-et-Loire, France

Gymnastics career
- Discipline: Women's artistic gymnastics
- Country represented: France
Medal record
Artistic Gymnastics
Representing France
Mediterranean Games
Gold medal – first place	2009 Pescara	Team All-Around

Marine Petit (born 15 November 1992) is a French artistic gymnast and a member of the French National Gymnastics Team. She participated in the 2007 World Artistic Gymnastics Championships, the 2008 Summer Olympics, and the 2010 World Artistic Gymnastics Championships.

== Career ==
Petit competed at the 2007 World Artistic Gymnastics Championships and helped the French team finish sixth in the team finals. Petit individually qualified for the individual all-around final where she placed sixteenth.

For the 2008 Summer Olympics in Beijing, China, Petit was selected to be a member of the French team. Petit helped the French team to finish in seventh place overall in the team all-around final. She qualified to the individual all-around final at the Olympics and placed nineteenth in the final.

After the Olympics, Petit continued her career in gymnastics at the 2010 World Artistic Gymnastics Championships. In the team event, the French team had a weak competition and finished eleventh after the qualification day, not high enough to advance them to the finals day. Petit herself did not qualify for any individual finals as well either.

Petit won the French all-around national championship title in 2011.
