= Sandra Izbașa =

Romanian artistic gymnast

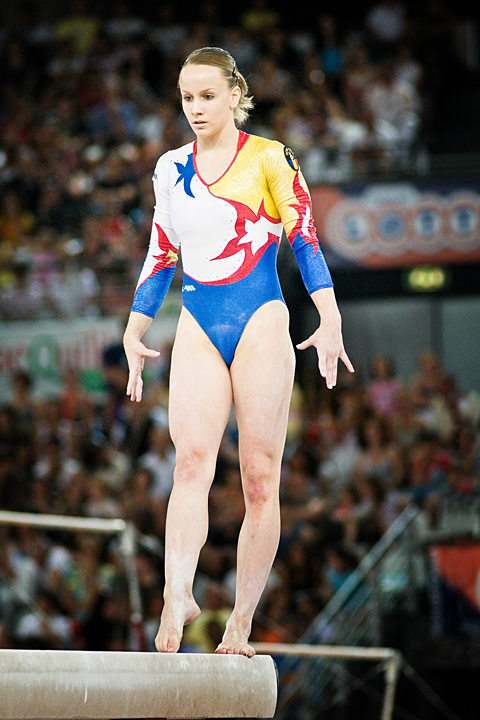
- Izbaşa on the beam in 2008

Personal information
- Full name: Sandra Raluca Izbașa
- Born: 18 June 1990 (age 36) Bucharest, Romania
- Height: 167 cm (5 ft 6 in)

Gymnastics career
- Discipline: Women's artistic gymnastics
- Country represented: Romania; (2002–2013)
- Club: CSA Steaua București
- Head coaches: Octavian Bellu, Mariana Bitang
- Former coaches: Nicolae Forminte, Livia Ponoran
- Choreographer: Puia Valer, Adriana Pop
- Retired: April 10, 2014
Medal record
Event	1st	2nd	3rd
Olympic Games	2	0	2
World Championships	0	1	2
European Championships	7	4	1
European Youth Olympic Festival	1	2	0
Total	10	7	5
Women's artistic gymnastics
Representing Romania
Olympic Games
Gold medal – first place	2008 Beijing	Floor Exercise
Gold medal – first place	2012 London	Vault
Bronze medal – third place	2008 Beijing	Team
Bronze medal – third place	2012 London	Team
World Championships
Silver medal – second place	2006 Aarhus	Balance Beam
Bronze medal – third place	2006 Aarhus	All Around
Bronze medal – third place	2007 Stuttgart	Team
European Championships
Gold medal – first place	2006 Volos	Floor Exercise
Gold medal – first place	2008 Clermont	Team
Gold medal – first place	2008 Clermont	Floor Exercise
Gold medal – first place	2011 Berlin	Vault
Gold medal – first place	2011 Berlin	Floor Exercise
Gold medal – first place	2012 Brussels	Team
Gold medal – first place	2012 Brussels	Vault
Silver medal – second place	2006 Volos	Team
Silver medal – second place	2007 Amsterdam	All Around
Silver medal – second place	2007 Amsterdam	Balance Beam
Silver medal – second place	2008 Clermont	Balance Beam
Bronze medal – third place	2006 Volos	Balance Beam

Sandra Raluca Izbașa (Romanian pronunciation: [ˈsandra izˈbaʃa]; born 18 June 1990) is a retired artistic gymnast from Romania. She is a double Olympic champion, having won the floor event at the 2008 Olympics and vault at the 2012 Olympics. She is also a winner of two Olympic bronze medals (as part of the Romanian team in 2008 and 2012) and multiple World Championship and European Championship medals.

== Senior career ==
=== 2006 ===
In April, Izbașa competed at the European Women's Artistic Gymnastics Championships in Volos, Greece, where she helped the Romanian team finish in second place. In event finals, she placed seventh on vault, scoring 13.950; third on balance beam, scoring 15.300; and first on floor, scoring 15.550.

In October, she competed at the 2006 World Artistic Gymnastics Championships in Aarhus, Denmark. She helped the Romanian team place fourth and placed third in the individual all-around with a score of 60.250. In event finals, she placed eighth on vault, scoring 14.562; second on balance beam, scoring 15.500; and sixth on floor, scoring 15.375.

In November, Izbașa competed at the Artistic Gymnastics World Cup event in Glasgow, United Kingdom. She placed third on balance beam with a score of 15.025, and first on floor with a score of 15.300.

=== 2007 ===
In March, Izbașa competed at the Artistic Gymnastics World Cup event in Paris. She placed sixth on vault, scoring 13.937; fifth on balance beam, scoring 14.950; and third on floor, scoring 14.950.

The following month, she competed at the 2007 European Artistic Gymnastics Championships in Amsterdam. She placed second in the all-around final with a score of 59.900. In event finals, she placed eighth on vault, scoring 13.975, and second on balance beam, scoring 15.525. She also qualified to the floor finals but had to withdraw due to injury.

In September, Izbașa competed at the 2007 World Artistic Gymnastics Championships in Stuttgart, Germany. She helped the Romanian team place third, and finished ninth individually with a score of 59.225. In event finals, she placed eighth on floor, scoring 14.525.

=== 2008 ===
In April, Izbașa competed at the 2008 European Women's Artistic Gymnastics Championships in Clermond-Ferrand, France. She contributed scores of 15.075 on vault, 15.350 on balance beam, and 15.750 on floor toward the Romanian team's first-place finish. In event finals, she placed second on balance beam, scoring 15.450, and first on floor, scoring 15.775.

Later in April, she competed at the Artistic Gymnastics World Cup event in Cottbus, Germany. She placed third on balance beam, scoring 15.300, and first on floor, scoring 15.300.

==== Beijing Olympics ====
In August, Izbașa competed at the 2008 Summer Olympics in Beijing. She contributed scores of 15.100 on vault, 15.600 on balance beam, and 15.550 on floor toward the Romanian team's third-place finish. Individually, she placed eighth in the all-around final with a score of 60.750, and she won the floor final with a score of 15.650.

In December, she competed at the Artistic Gymnastics World Cup final in Madrid. She placed fourth on balance beam, scoring 14.925, and third on floor, scoring 15.000.

=== 2009 ===
In March, Izbașa competed at the City of Jesolo Trophy in Italy. Shortly thereafter, she competed at the 2009 European Artistic Gymnastics Championships in Milan, Italy, where she placed seventh in the floor final with a score of 13.900. In April, she was featured on the cover of International Gymnast Magazine for her Olympic achievements.

Later in 2009, she enrolled as a student at the Faculty of Sports and Physical Education of Babeș-Bolyai University in Cluj-Napoca.

In September, Izbașa tore her right Achilles tendon and injured her hand while performing a piked full-in back-out on floor. She had surgery to repair the tendon.

=== 2010 ===
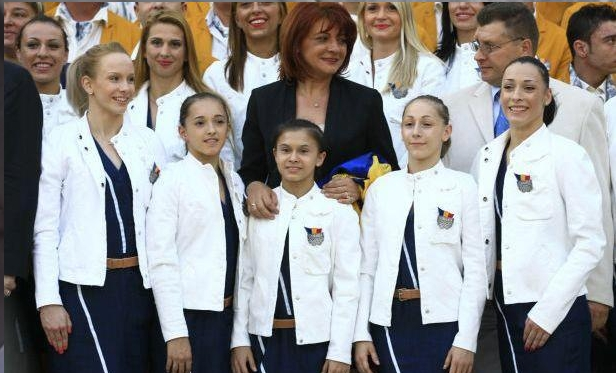
Izbașa (first on the left) in 2010

In September, Izbașa returned to competition at the Artistic Gymnastics World Cup event in Ghent, Belgium. She won the floor final with a score of 14.325. Later in September, she competed at the Romanian National Championships in Reșița, where she placed second on vault, scoring 14.400; second on balance beam, scoring 14.800; and first on floor, scoring 15.150.

In October, she competed at the 2010 World Artistic Gymnastics Championships in Rotterdam. She contributed scores of 14.700 on vault, 14.333 on balance beam, and 14.200 on floor toward the Romanian team's fourth-place finish. In event finals, she placed seventh on floor with a score of 13.983. Before the competition, she said, "I don't plan on winning any (individual) medals. For me the most important thing is to come back and help my team. The fact that I can lend a hand to help the girls in the team competition matters most. I watched several videos of the Russian and American women. The gymnasts are strong and the competition will be quite high."

=== 2011 ===
Izbașa on floor in 2011

In March, Izbașa competed at the Artistic Gymnastics World Cup event in Paris. She won the floor final with a score of 14.833.

In April, she competed at the 2011 European Artistic Gymnastics Championships in Berlin. She placed first on vault with a score of 14.525 and first on floor with a score of 14.600.

In September, Izbașa competed at an international meet against Germany and Switzerland in Erzingen, Germany. She helped Romania win the team competition with scores of 14.150 on vault, 13.200 on uneven bars, and 14.150 on balance beam.

In October, she was supposed to compete at the 2011 World Artistic Gymnastics Championships in Tokyo but injured her foot.

=== 2012 ===
In April, Izbașa competed at an international meet in Cholet, France. She helped Romania win the team competition and placed second in the individual all-around with a score of 56.600.

In May, she competed at the 2012 European Women's Artistic Gymnastics Championships in Brussels, Belgium. She contributed a vault score of 15.200 toward the Romanian team's first-place finish, and won the vault final with a score of 14.833.

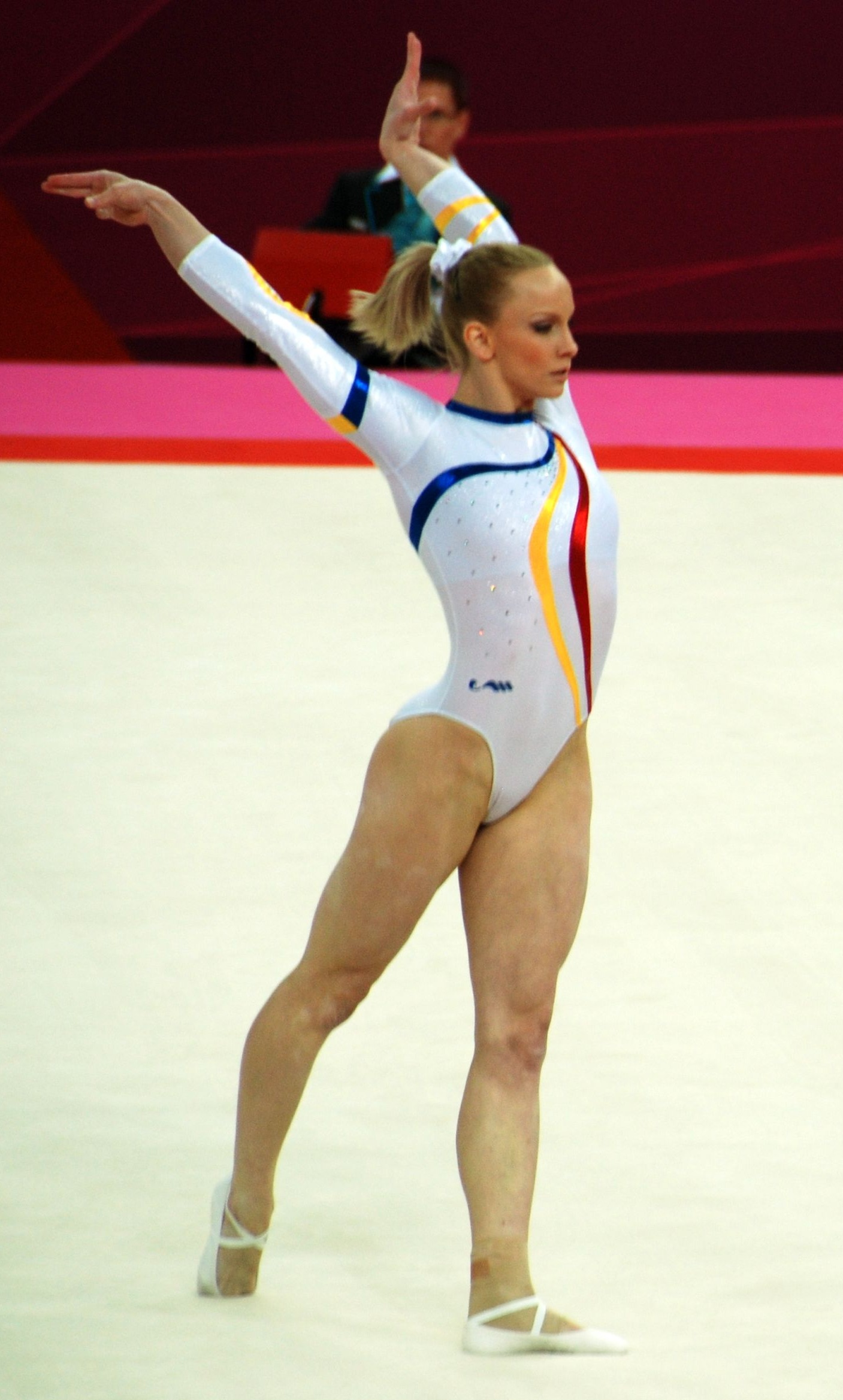
Floor exercise

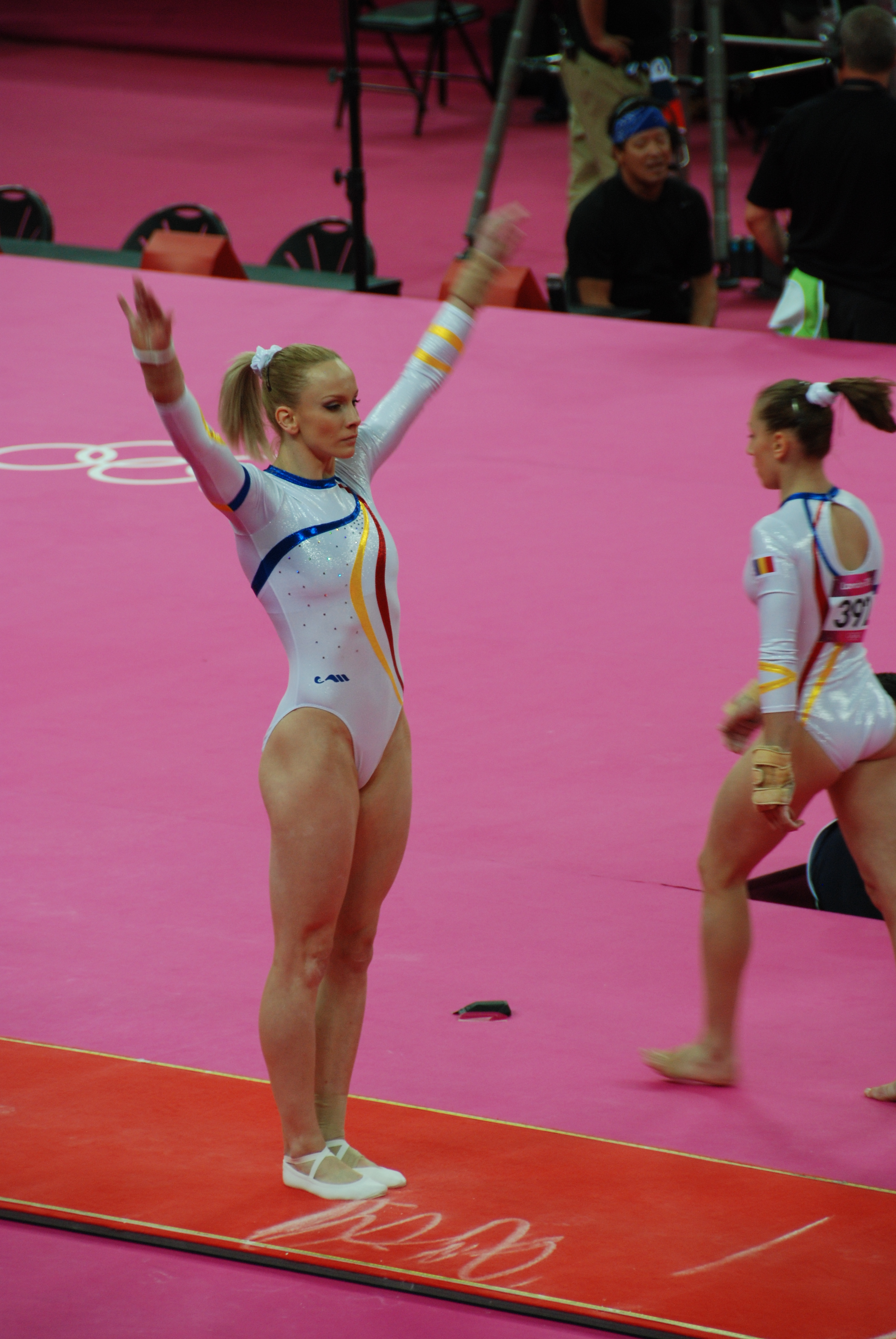
Vault

Izbașa at the 2012 Olympics

At the beginning of July, she competed at an international meet against France, Germany, and Italy in Bucharest, Romania. She helped Romania win the team competition and placed second in the all-around with a score of 59.150.

==== London Olympics ====
At the end of July, Izbașa competed at the 2012 Summer Olympics in London. She helped the Romanian team qualify in fourth place to the team final, and qualified to the individual all-around final with a score of 57.532. She qualified second to the vault final with a score of 15.316 and second to the floor final with a score of 15.066. In the team final, she contributed scores of 15.100 on vault and 15.200 on floor toward the Romanian team's third-place finish.

In the all-around final, Izbașa placed fifth with a score of 58.833. She won the vault final with a score of 15.191. "Honestly, the vault final is a war of nerves, and it showed," she said. "I can't say I feel satisfied as I have the floor final to come. It means a lot, but honestly, I didn't expect it, especially as I was competing last." She placed eighth in the floor final with a score of 13.333 after falling on her final tumbling pass. She was chosen as Romania's flag bearer for the Olympic closing ceremony.

=== 2013 ===
Izbașa performing on floor at the 2013 World Artistic Gymnastics Championships in Antwerp, Belgium.

Izbașa prepared for the 2013 European Championships in Moscow in April, but reportedly decided not to compete due to lack of training. She took a short break from training to prepare for her bachelor's degree.

In October, Izbașa competed at the 2013 World Artistic Gymnastics Championships in Antwerp. In qualifications, she placed second on floor exercise with a score of 14.733. She finished seventh in the finals with a score of 13.733 after falling out of her final pass in a series of twisting and bounding skills just like she did in the individual floor final at the 2012 Summer Olympics in London.

She initially decided to retire following the World Championships, but returned to training in 2015 in a bid to make the 2016 Olympic team. However, this effort was short-lived, as she decided she would not be ready to compete with elite-level routines in time for the Olympics.

== Competitive history ==
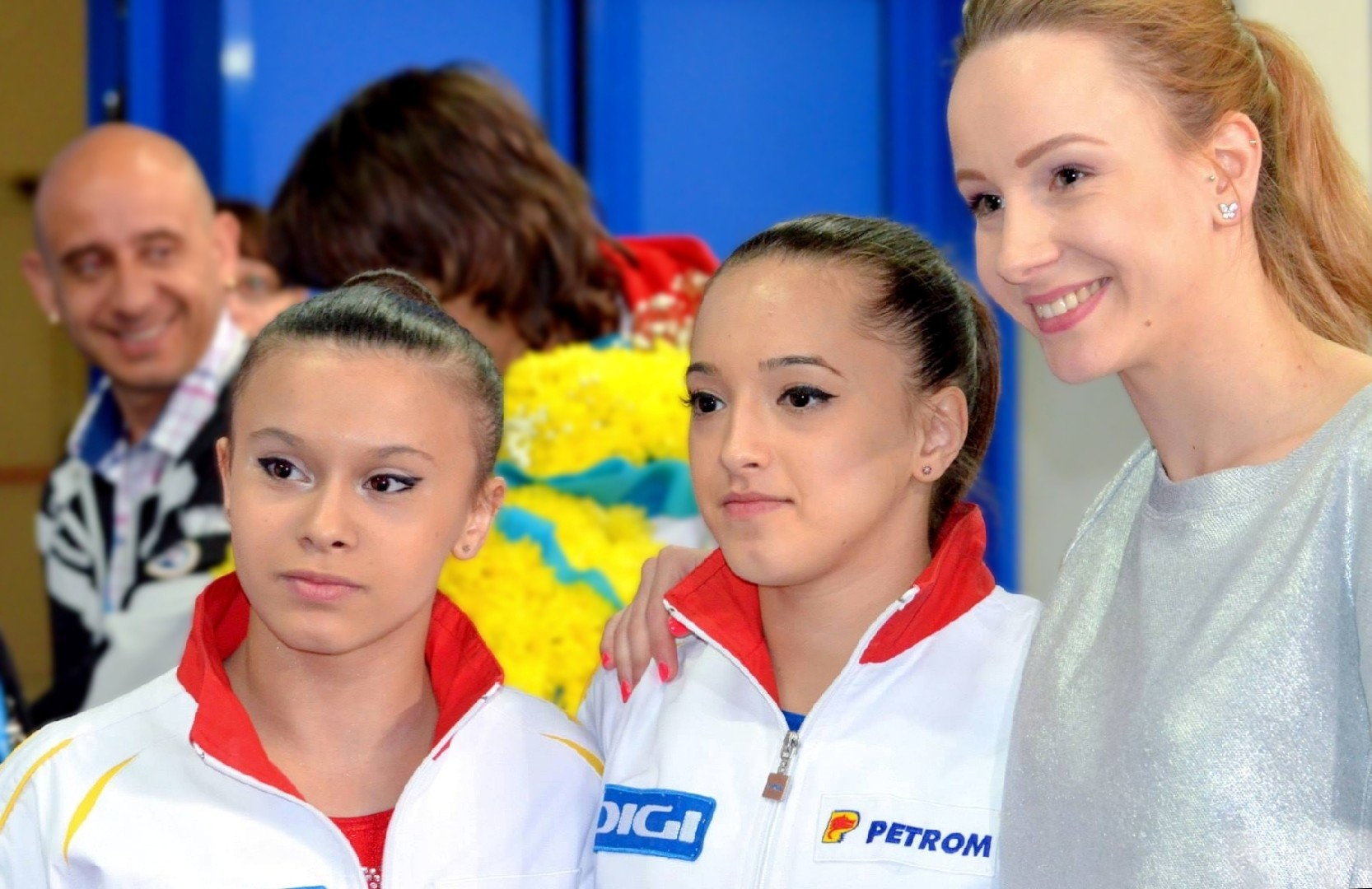
Izbașa (right) with Diana Bulimar and Larisa Iordache.

Competitive history of Sandra Izbașa at the junior level
Year	Event	Team	AA	VT	UB	BB	FX
2004
2004	Junior European Championships	2nd place, silver medalist(s)	6	5		4	2nd place, silver medalist(s)
2004	Chunichi Cup		3rd place, bronze medalist(s)				
2004	Romanian Championships		2nd place, silver medalist(s)				
2005	Arthur Gander Memorial		1st place, gold medalist(s)				
2005	Junior Japan International			1st place, gold medalist(s)			1st place, gold medalist(s)
2005	Swiss Cup Juniors		2nd place, silver medalist(s)				

Competitive history of Sandra Izbașa at the senior level
Year	Event	Team	AA	VT	UB	BB	FX
2006	Romanian Championships		1st place, gold medalist(s)	1st place, gold medalist(s)			1st place, gold medalist(s)
2006	Lyon World Cup				6	3rd place, bronze medalist(s)	2nd place, silver medalist(s)
2006	Glasgow World Cup						1st place, gold medalist(s)
2006	European Championships	2nd place, silver medalist(s)		7		3rd place, bronze medalist(s)	1st place, gold medalist(s)
2006	World Championships	4	3rd place, bronze medalist(s)	8		2nd place, silver medalist(s)	6
2007
2007	European Championships		2nd place, silver medalist(s)	8		2nd place, silver medalist(s)	
2007	World Championships	3rd place, bronze medalist(s)	9				8
2007	Paris World Cup			6		5	3rd place, bronze medalist(s)
2008
2008	European Championships	1st place, gold medalist(s)				2nd place, silver medalist(s)	1st place, gold medalist(s)
2008	Olympic Games	3rd place, bronze medalist(s)	8				1st place, gold medalist(s)
2008	Arthur Gander Memorial		1st place, gold medalist(s)				
2008	Swiss Cup	2nd place, silver medalist(s)					
2008	Toyota Cup					2nd place, silver medalist(s)	1st place, gold medalist(s)
2008	Italian Grand Prix					2nd place, silver medalist(s)	1st place, gold medalist(s)
2008	Cottbus World Cup					3rd place, bronze medalist(s)	1st place, gold medalist(s)
2008	World Cup Final					4	3rd place, bronze medalist(s)
2008	GBR-ROU Friendly	1st place, gold medalist(s)	3rd place, bronze medalist(s)			1st place, gold medalist(s)	1st place, gold medalist(s)
2009	Nadia Comăneci Invitational		1st place, gold medalist(s)				
2009	City of Jesolo Trophy	2nd place, silver medalist(s)					
2009	European Championships						7
2010	Ghent World Cup						1st place, gold medalist(s)
2010	World Championships	4					7
2010	Arthur Gander Memorial		2nd place, silver medalist(s)				
2010	SUI-GER-ROU Friendly	1st place, gold medalist(s)					
2010	Swiss Cup	4					
2011	Paris Challenge Cup						1st place, gold medalist(s)
2011	SUI-GER-ROU Friendly	1st place, gold medalist(s)					
2011	European Championships			1st place, gold medalist(s)			1st place, gold medalist(s)
2012
2012	European Championships	1st place, gold medalist(s)		1st place, gold medalist(s)			
2012	FRA-ROU Friendly	1st place, gold medalist(s)	2nd place, silver medalist(s)				
2012	Romanian International Friendly	1st place, gold medalist(s)	2nd place, silver medalist(s)				
2012	Olympic Games	3rd place, bronze medalist(s)	5	1st place, gold medalist(s)			8
2013	Dutch Invitational						2nd place, silver medalist(s)
2013	World Championships						7
2015	FRA-ROU Friendly	1st place, gold medalist(s)					

== Floor music ==
Year	Music Title
2008	Taniec Eleny
2010	Kalinka and Hava Nagila
2011	Tango Amore
2012	Shine On You Crazy Diamond
2013	Feeling Good

== See also ==
- List of Olympic female gymnasts for Romania
