= 2005 European Artistic Gymnastics Championships =

1st Individual European Artistic Gymnastics Championships
- Location: Debrecen, Hungary
- Dates: 2 June to 5 June 2005
- Nations: Members of the European Union of Gymnastics

The 1st Individual European Artistic Gymnastics Championships (European Men's and Women's Artistic Gymnastics Individual Championships) were held in Debrecen, Hungary, on 2 June to 5 June 2005. It included both men's and women's events.

== Medal winners ==
Event	Gold	Silver	Bronze
Men
All-around	Rafael Martínez (ESP)	Răzvan Șelariu (ROU)	Denis Savenkov (BLR)
Floor	Marian Drăgulescu (ROU)	Răzvan Șelariu (ROU)	Róbert Gál (HUN)
Pommel horse	Krisztián Berki (HUN)	Marius Urzică (ROU)	Nikolai Kryukov (RUS)
Rings	Andrea Coppolino (ITA); Yuri van Gelder (NED)	none awarded	Alexander Safoshkin (RUS)
Vault	Evgeni Sapronenko (LAT)	Filip Yanev (BUL)	Răzvan Șelariu (ROU); Jeffrey Wammes (NED)
Parallel bars	Manuel Carballo (ESP)	Yann Cucherat (FRA)	Mitja Petkovšek (SLO)
Horizontal bar	Fabian Hambüchen (GER)	Igor Cassina (ITA)	Valeriy Honcharov (UKR)
Women
All-around	Marine Debauve (FRA)	Anna Pavlova (RUS)	Yulia Lozhechko (RUS)
Vault	Francesca Benolli (ITA)	Anna Pavlova (RUS)	Aagje Vanwalleghem (BEL)
Uneven bars	Émilie Le Pennec (FRA)	Tania Gener (ESP)	Dariya Zgoba (UKR)
Balance beam	Cătălina Ponor (ROU)	Marine Debauve (FRA)	Anna Pavlova (RUS)
Floor	Isabelle Severino (FRA)	Suzanne Harmes (NED)	Émilie Le Pennec (FRA)

=== Medal table ===
==== Combined ====
Rank	Nation	Gold	Silver	Bronze	Total
1	France (FRA)	3	2	1	6
2	Romania (ROU)	2	3	1	6
3	Italy (ITA)	2	1	0	3
3	Spain (ESP)	2	1	0	3
5	Netherlands (NED)	1	1	1	3
6	Hungary (HUN)	1	0	1	2
7	Germany (GER)	1	0	0	1
7	Latvia (LAT)	1	0	0	1
9	Russia (RUS)	0	2	4	6
10	Bulgaria (BUL)	0	1	0	1
11	Ukraine (UKR)	0	0	2	2
12	Belarus (BLR)	0	0	1	1
12	Belgium (BEL)	0	0	1	1
12	Slovenia (SLO)	0	0	1	1
Totals (14 entries)		13	11	13	37

==== Men ====
Rank	Nation	Gold	Silver	Bronze	Total
1	Spain (ESP)	2	0	0	2
2	Romania (ROU)	1	3	1	5
3	Italy (ITA)	1	1	0	2
4	Hungary (HUN)	1	0	1	2
4	Netherlands (NED)	1	0	1	2
6	Germany (GER)	1	0	0	1
6	Latvia (LAT)	1	0	0	1
8	Bulgaria (BUL)	0	1	0	1
8	France (FRA)	0	1	0	1
10	Russia (RUS)	0	0	2	2
11	Belarus (BLR)	0	0	1	1
11	Slovenia (SLO)	0	0	1	1
11	Ukraine (UKR)	0	0	1	1
Totals (13 entries)		8	6	8	22

==== Women ====
Rank	Nation	Gold	Silver	Bronze	Total
1	France (FRA)	3	1	1	5
2	Italy (ITA)	1	0	0	1
2	Romania (ROU)	1	0	0	1
4	Russia (RUS)	0	2	2	4
5	Netherlands (NED)	0	1	0	1
5	Spain (ESP)	0	1	0	1
7	Belgium (BEL)	0	0	1	1
7	Ukraine (UKR)	0	0	1	1
Totals (8 entries)		5	5	5	15

== Men's results ==
=== Individual all-around ===
Rank	Gymnast	Floor (gymnastics)	Pommel horse	Rings (gymnastics)	Vault (gymnastics)	Parallel bars	Horizontal bar	Total
1st place, gold medalist(s)	Rafael Martínez (ESP)	9.300	9.100	9.225	8.900	9.175	9.650	55.350
2nd place, silver medalist(s)	Răzvan Șelariu (ROU)	9.475	9.187	9.025	9.550	8.950	9.050	55.237
3rd place, bronze medalist(s)	Denis Savenkov (BLR)	8.937	9.262	9.000	9.450	9.137	9.162	54.948
4	Sergei Khorokhordin (RUS)	8.100	8.962	9.137	9.662	9.112	9.437	54.410
5	Dimitri Savitski (BLR)	9.187	8.425	9.275	9.337	8.937	9.225	54.386
6	Ioan Silviu Suciu (ROU)	9.212	9.612	9.125	9.687	7.787	8.825	54.248
7	Anatoli Vasiliev (RUS)	8.537	9.137	8.437	9.537	9.087	9.225	53.960
8	Manuel Campos (POR)	9.125	9.487	8.387	9.062	9.000	8.850	53.911
9	Evgenij Spiridonov (GER)	8.812	9.275	8.650	9.187	8.937	8.450	53.311
10	Martin Konečný (CZE)	9.062	8.762	8.650	9.625	8.500	8.225	52.824
11	Jeffrey Wammes (NED)	9.450	7.900	8.375	9.587	8.112	8.912	52.336
12	Christian Berczes (GER)	7.737	8.987	9.262	9.212	8.900	8.212	52.310
13	Marcell Hetrovics (HUN)	8.462	8.687	9.050	9.350	8.925	7.750	52.224
14	Vahag Stepanyan (ARM)	8.437	8.962	9.062	9.025	8.537	8.150	52.173
15	Epke Zonderland (NED)	8.173	9.037	7.700	8.925	8.912	8.950	51.661
16	Ross Brewer (GBR)	8.387	9.137	8.375	9.112	8.462	7.887	51.360
17	Christos Lympanovnos (GRE)	8.700	8.187	8.600	8.675	8.650	8.450	51.262
18	Sami Aalto (FIN)	8.550	8.825	8.237	8.962	8.375	8.250	51.199
19	Kamil Hulboj (POL)	8.162	8.775	8.137	8.850	8.512	8.650	51.086
20	Nicolas Böschenstein (SUI)	7.875	7.987	8.750	9.362	8.737	7.887	50.598
21	Jimmu Bostrom (SWE)	8.325	8.962	8.250	8.687	8.212	7.900	50.336
22	Jeppe Villekjaer (DEN)	8.537	8.525	7.950	9.225	8.425	7.425	50.087
23	Claudio Capelli (SUI)			8.412	8.800			17.212

=== Floor exercise ===
Rank	Gymnast	Total
1st place, gold medalist(s)	Marian Drăgulescu (ROU)	9.637
2nd place, silver medalist(s)	Răzvan Șelariu (ROU)	9.487
3rd place, bronze medalist(s)	Róbert Gál (HUN)	9.387
4	Jeffrey Wammes (NED)	9.362
5	Dimitri Karbanenko (FRA)	9.287
6	Patrick Dominiguez (SUI)	9.137
7	Martin Konečný (CZE)	8.875
8	David Vyoral (CZE)	8.825

=== Pommel horse ===
Rank	Gymnast	Total
1st place, gold medalist(s)	Krisztián Berki (HUN)	9.775
2nd place, silver medalist(s)	Marius Urzică (ROU)	9.762
3rd place, bronze medalist(s)	Nikolai Kryukov (RUS)	9.650
4	Robert Seligman (CRO)	9.587
5	Ilie Daniel Popescu (ROU)	9.487
6	Eric Casimir (FRA)	9.275
7	Thomas Andergassen (GER)	9.112
8	Alberto Busnari (ITA)	9.050

=== Rings ===
Rank	Gymnast	Total
1st place, gold medalist(s)	Andrea Coppolino (ITA)	9.712
1st place, gold medalist(s)	Yuri van Gelder (NED)	9.712
3rd place, bronze medalist(s)	Alexander Safoshkin (RUS)	9.675
4	Yordan Yovchev (BUL)	9.637
5	Matteo Morandi (ITA)	9.625
6	Oleksandr Vorobiov (UKR)	9.550
7	Danny Rodrigues (FRA)	9.537
8	Herodotos Giorgallas (CYP)	9.237

=== Vault ===
Rank	Gymnast	Score 1	Score 2	Total
1st place, gold medalist(s)	Jevgēņijs Saproņenko (LAT)	9.625	9.762	9.693
2nd place, silver medalist(s)	Filip Yanev (BUL)	9.625	9.562	9.593
3rd place, bronze medalist(s)	Răzvan Șelariu (ROU)	9.587	9.550	9.568
3rd place, bronze medalist(s)	Jeffrey Wammes (NED)	9.587	9.550	9.568
5	Patrick Dominguez (SUI)	9.587	9.525	9.556
6	Alin Jivan (ROU)	9.550	9.412	9.481
7	Raphael Wignanitz (FRA)	9.512	9.437	9.474
8	Vlasios Maras (GRE)	9.025	9.375	9.200

=== Parallel bars ===
Rank	Gymnast	Total
1st place, gold medalist(s)	Manuel Carballo (ESP)	9.712
2nd place, silver medalist(s)	Yann Cucherat (FRA)	9.587
3rd place, bronze medalist(s)	Mitja Petkovšek (SLO)	9.537
4	Thomas Andergassen (GER)	9.412
5	Marius Urzică (ROU)	9.200
6	Andreu Vivó (ESP)	8.225
7	Ioan Silviu Suciu (ROU)	7.925
8	Johan Mounard (FRA)	7.850

=== Horizontal bar ===
Rank	Gymnast	Total
1st place, gold medalist(s)	Fabian Hambüchen (GER)	9.750
2nd place, silver medalist(s)	Igor Cassina (ITA)	9.737
3rd place, bronze medalist(s)	Valeri Goncharov (UKR)	9.687
4	Yann Cucherat (FRA)	9.675
5	Aljaž Pegan (SLO)	9.625
6	Jeffrey Wammes (NED)	9.050
7	Vlasios Maras (GRE)	8.937
8	Rafael Martínez (ESP)	8.900

== Women's results ==
=== Individual all-around ===
Position	Gymnast	Vault (gymnastics)	Uneven bars	Balance beam	Floor (gymnastics)	Total
1st place, gold medalist(s)	Marine Debauve (FRA)	8.962	9.487	9.487	9.162	37.098
2nd place, silver medalist(s)	Anna Pavlova (RUS)	9.450	9.037	9.462	9.125	37.074
3rd place, bronze medalist(s)	Yulia Lozhechko (RUS)	9.037	9.325	9.150	9.237	36.749
4	Suzanne Harmes (NED)	9.012	9.250	8.950	9.375	36.587
5	Francesca Benolli (ITA)	9.462	9.075	8.425	9.175	36.137
6	Aagje Vanwalleghem (BEL)	9.275	9.237	8.737	8.637	35.886
7	Florica Leonida (ROU)	9.187	9.312	8.525	8.775	35.799
8	Émilie Le Pennec (FRA)	9.200	9.637	7.325	9.475	35.637
9	Dariya Zgoba (UKR)	8.937	9.512	8.725	8.100	35.274
10	Monica Bergamelli (ITA)	8.925	9.075	8.725	8.537	35.262
11	Loes Linders (NED)	8.887	8.800	8.775	8.687	35.149
12	Laura Campos (ESP)	9.362	8.425	8.300	8.825	34.912
13	Jana Šikulová (CZE)	8.912	9.300	8.125	8.412	34.749
14	Stefani Bismpikou (GRE)	8.950	8.012	9.300	8.387	34.649
15	Melanie Marti (SUI)	9.150	8.837	7.662	8.875	34.524
16	Kateřina Marešová (CZE)	8.975	9.162	7.962	8.262	34.361
17	Joanna Skowrońska (POL)	9.275	9.012	7.425	8.612	34.324
18	Olga Sherbatykh (UKR)	9.237	8.162	8.462	8.412	34.273
19	Danielle Englert (SUI)	9.150	9.062	7.612	8.425	34.249
20	Marta Pihan-Kulesza (POL)	8.775	8.887	8.175	8.187	34.024
21	Carina Hasenöhrl (AUT)	8.987	8.725	8.250	7.875	33.837
22	Heike Gunne (GER)	8.937	8.425	8.100	8.225	33.687
23	Tina Erceg (CRO)	8.400	9.112	7.687	8.437	33.636
24	Beth Tweddle (GBR)	9.175				9.175

=== Vault ===
Rank	Gymnast	Score 1	Score 2	Total
1st place, gold medalist(s)	Francesca Benolli (ITA)	9.487	9.337	9.412
2nd place, silver medalist(s)	Anna Pavlova (RUS)	9.300	9.325	9.312
3rd place, bronze medalist(s)	Aagje Vanwalleghem (BEL)	9.312	9.075	9.193
4	Ariella Käslin (SUI)	9.150	9.162	9.156
5	Elena Zamolodchikova (RUS)	9.400	8.862	9.131
6	Olga Sherbatykh (UKR)	9.250	9.000	9.125
7	Suzanne Harmes (NED)	9.212	9.000	9.106
8	Samantha Bayley (GBR)	8.225	9.075	8.650

=== Uneven Bars ===
Rank	Gymnast	Total
1st place, gold medalist(s)	Émilie Le Pennec (FRA)	9.687
2nd place, silver medalist(s)	Tania Gener (ESP)	9.562
3rd place, bronze medalist(s)	Dariya Zgoba (UKR)	9.500
4	Marine Debauve (FRA)	9.350
5	Jana Šikulová (CZE)	9.325
6	Olga Sherbatykh (UKR)	9.137
7	Laura Campos (ESP)	8.937
8	Daniela Șofronie (ROU)	7.825

=== Balance Beam ===
Rank	Gymnast	Total
1st place, gold medalist(s)	Cătălina Ponor (ROU)	9.737
2nd place, silver medalist(s)	Marine Debauve (FRA)	9.487
3rd place, bronze medalist(s)	Anna Pavlova (RUS)	9.325
4	Ilaria Colombo (ITA)	9.212
5	Suzanne Harmes (NED)	9.087
6	Loes Linders (NED)	8.750
7	Aagje Vanwalleghem (BEL)	8.400
8	Émilie Le Pennec (FRA)	8.025

=== Floor Exercise ===
Rank	Gymnast	Total
1st place, gold medalist(s)	Isabelle Severino (FRA)	9.575
2nd place, silver medalist(s)	Suzanne Harmes (NED)	9.375
3rd place, bronze medalist(s)	Émilie Le Pennec (FRA)	9.337
4	Cătălina Ponor (ROU)	9.200
5	Francesca Benolli (ITA)	9.075
6	Yulia Lozhechko (RUS)	8.962
7	Marta Pihan-Kulesza (POL)	8.875
8	Elena Zamolodchikova (RUS)	8.475
