= 2005 World Artistic Gymnastics Championships =

Gymnastics competition

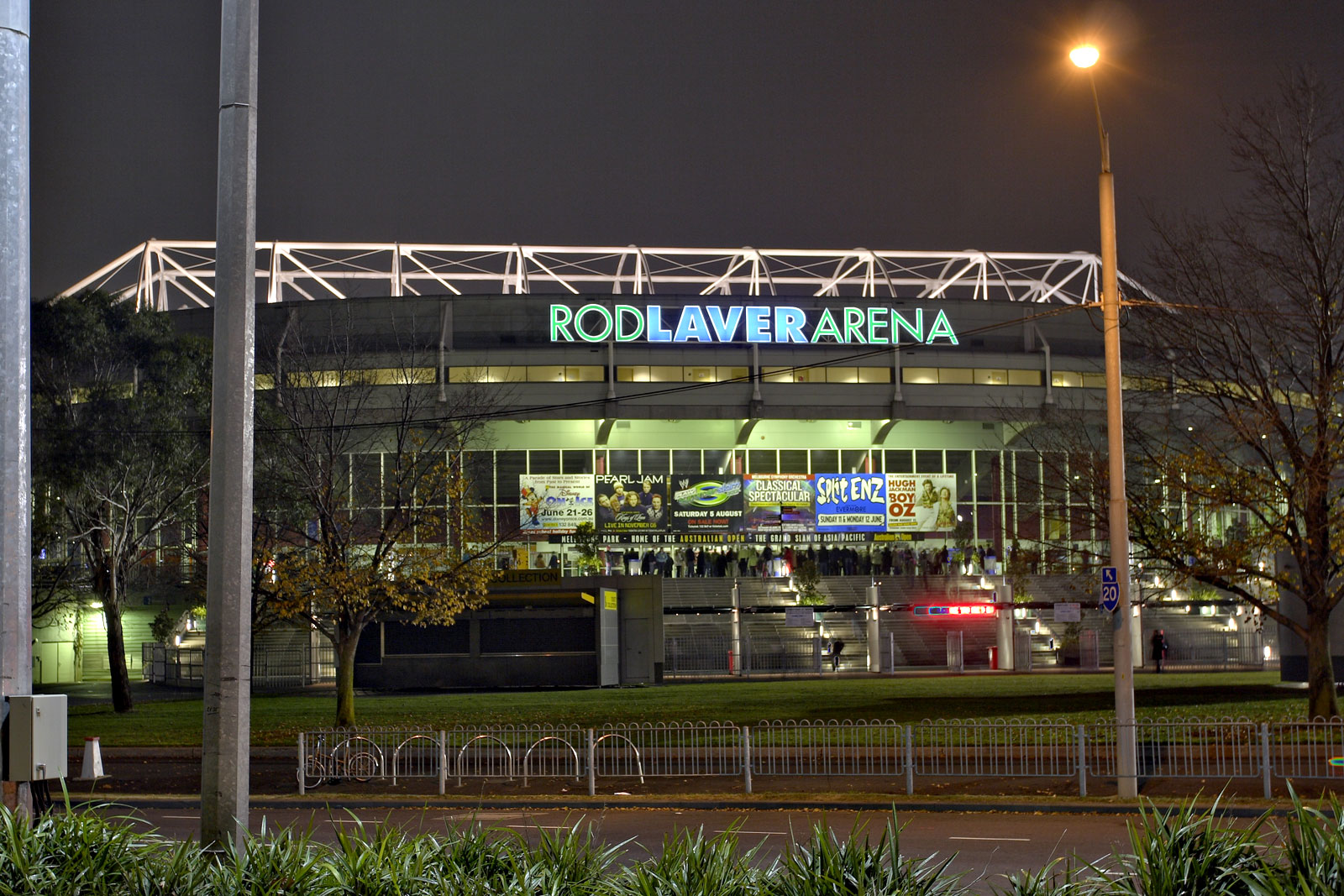
- Rod Laver Arena, where the competition took place
- Venue: Rod Laver Arena
- Location: Melbourne, Australia
- Start date: November 21, 2005
- End date: November 27, 2005

Logo

The 38th World Artistic Gymnastics Championships were held at the Rod Laver Arena in Melbourne, Australia from 21 to 27 November 2005. Only the individual all-around and event finals were contested at this meet. There was no team competition; nations were permitted to bring up to six Men's Artistic Gymnastics (MAG) and up to four Women's Artistic Gymnastics (WAG) athletes to compete.

== Results ==
Event	Gold	Silver	Bronze
Men
Individual all-around	(Japan) Hiroyuki Tomita	(Japan) Hisashi Mizutori	(Belarus) Denis Savenkov
Floor	(Brazil) Diego Hypólito	(Canada) Brandon O'Neill	(Hungary) Róbert Gál (China) Liang Fuliang
Pommel horse	(China) Xiao Qin	(Romania) Ioan Suciu	(Japan) Takehiro Kashima
Rings	(Netherlands) Yuri van Gelder	(Russia) Alexander Safoshkin	(Italy) Matteo Morandi
Vault	(Romania) Marian Drăgulescu	(Poland) Leszek Blanik	(Romania) Alin Jivan
Parallel Bars	(Slovenia) Mitja Petkovšek	(China) Li Xiaopeng	(France) Yann Cucherat
Horizontal bar	(Slovenia) Aljaž Pegan	(France) Yann Cucherat	(Ukraine) Valeri Goncharov
Women
Individual all-around	(United States) Chellsie Memmel	(United States) Nastia Liukin	(Australia) Monette Russo
Vault	(China) Cheng Fei	(Uzbekistan) Oksana Chusovitina	(United States) Alicia Sacramone
Uneven bars	(United States) Nastia Liukin	(United States) Chellsie Memmel	(United Kingdom) Beth Tweddle
Balance beam	(United States) Nastia Liukin	(United States) Chellsie Memmel	(Romania) Cătălina Ponor
Floor	(United States) Alicia Sacramone	(United States) Nastia Liukin	(Netherlands) Suzanne Harmes

== Men ==
=== Qualification ===
Rank	Team	Floor (gymnastics)	Pommel horse	Rings (gymnastics)	Vault (gymnastics)	Parallel bars	Horizontal bar	Total
1	Hiroyuki Tomita (JPN)	9.337	9.662	9.487	9.375	9.625	9.737	57.223 Q
2	Hisashi Mizutori (JPN)	9.362	9.375	9.075	9.487	9.437	8.95	55.686 Q
3	Rafael Martínez (ESP)	9.05	9.375	9.237	9.287	8.837	9.537	55.323 Q
4	Dae Eun Kim (KOR)	8.2	9.3	9.312	9.35	9.3	8.85	54.312 Q
5	Dorin Razvan Selariu (ROM)	8.65	9.037	9.325	9.425	8.437	9.375	54.249 Q
6	Dimitri Savitski (BLR)	9.1	8.937	9.112	9.375	8.625	9.025	54.174 Q
7	Yernar Yerimbetov (KAZ)	8	8.475	9.05	9.525	9.537	9.537	54.124 Q
8	Denis Savenkov (BLR)	8.837	8.437	8.962	9.262	9.225	9.35	54.073 Q
9	Shu Wai Ng (MAS)	9.05	9	9	9.187	8.55	9.225	54.012 Q
10	Nicolas Boeschenstein (SUI)	8.537	8.55	8.65	9.225	9.412	9.125	53.499 Q
11	Eugen Spiridonov (GER)	8.887	9.487	8.2	9.325	9.025	8.55	53.474 Q
12	Luis Rivera (PUR)	8.925	9.45	9.075	9.362	8.375	7.875	53.062 Q
13	Epke Zonderland (NED)	8.437	8.812	8.075	9.187	9.175	9.3	52.986 Q
14	Liang Fuliang (CHN)	9.55	8.762	8.6	9.5	7.4	8.95	52.762 Q
15	Jeffrey Wammes (NED)	9.587	7.825	8.325	9.612	7.775	9.487	52.611 Q
16	Sergei Khorokhordin (RUS)	8.025	8.375	9.112	9.287	9.05	8.425	52.274 Q
17	Joshua Jefferis (AUS)	8.537	7.375	9.225	9.137	8.85	8.925	52.049 Q
18	Ildar Valeev (KAZ)	8.212	8.837	9.3	9	8.337	8.05	51.736 Q
19	Sami Aalto (FIN)	8.625	8.962	8.5	8.987	8.375	8.175	51.624 Q
20	Anton Fokin (UZB)	7.837	7.625	8.712	9.337	9.537	8.5	51.548 Q
21	Todd Thornton (USA)	8.85	8.862	8.737	8.525	8.387	8.1	51.461 Q
22	Ross Brewer (GBR)	8.262	9.15	8.375	9.012	8.7	7.925	51.424 Q
23	Claudio Capelli (SUI)	8.912	8.325	8.412	8.925	8.3	8.55	51.424 Q
24	Mosiah Rodrigues (BRA)	7.662	8.725	7.775	9.2	8.4	9.425	51.187 Q
25	Mark Holyoake (NZL)	8.4	8.675	8.35	8.875	8.487	8.1	50.887 R
26	Jimmy Bostrom (SWE)	8.537	7.675	8.375	8.812	8.412	8.375	50.186 R
27	Martin Konečný (CZE)	8.175	7.6	8.862	9.337	8.1	8.075	50.149 R
28	Jani Tanskanen (FIN)	8.125	8.25	7.875	8.937	8.15	8.675	50.012 R
29	Bjorn Slanvall (SWE)	8.287	8.287	8.55	8.4	8.112	7.975	49.611
30	Roman Kulesza (POL)	7.9	7.95	7.675	9.162	8.937	7.8	49.424
31	Linas Gaveika (LTU)	8.275	7.675	7.55	8.775	8.175	8.9	49.35
32	Helge Vammen (DEN)	8.2	8.4	7.7	9.05	8.15	7.825	49.325
33	Marco Baldauf (AUT)	8.312	7.85	7.612	8.725	8.462	8.3	49.261
34	Jose David Ramos (PUR)	8.537	7.425	7.125	9.025	8.437	8.65	49.199
35	Eduard Gholub (ISR)	7.537	8.437	9.137	8.537	7.325	8.075	49.048
36	Daniel Rexa (CZE)	8.087	8.262	7.462	8.55	8.075	8.025	48.461
37	Espen Jansen (NOR)	8.225	7.05	8.2	8.762	7.912	8.125	48.274
38	Wei Siang Ooi (MAS)	7.975	7.4	6.7	9.187	8.375	8.6	48.237
39	Noureddine Yahouia (ALG)	7.75	7.35	8.462	8.25	8.287	7.975	48.074
40	Karim Guezgouz (ALG)	7.55	8.137	7.65	9.087	7.675	7.95	48.049
41	Mario Rauscher (AUT)	7.475	7.8	7.687	8.687	7.812	8.525	47.986
42	Viktor Kristmannsson (ISL)	6.825	7.625	7.7	8.725	8.312	7.987	47.174
43	Jeppe Nielsen (DEN)	8.25	6.75	8.15	9.212	7.15	7.55	47.062
44	Felipe Pina (CHI)	7.925	7.6	7.437	8.65	7.35	7.625	46.587
45	Oscar Anibal Canas Figueroa (ESA)	6.837	7.95	6.825	8.362	7.625	7.775	45.374
46	Dimitri Trefilovs (LAT)	6.95	7.225	7.1	8.025	7.675	8.375	45.35
47	Cristian Brezeanu (RSA)	7.975	6.7	7.537	7.5	8	7.562	45.274
48	Joachim Hanche-Olsen (NOR)	7.475	6.325	7.15	8.35	7.562	7.375	44.237
49	Kutlwano Mothibi (BOT)	6.475	6.35	7.2	9.087	7.1	7.725	43.937
50	José Luis Fuentes (VEN)	8.05	8.862	8.4		8.862	9	43.174
51	Anthony van Assche (NED)	8.187	7.85		8.712	8.525	8.325	41.599
52	Adan Santos (BRA)	6.875		8.862	9.025	8.562	7.45	40.774
53	Henrik Rasmussen (DEN)	8.212	7.2		8.625	8.237	7.675	39.949
54	Juan Pablo Gonzalez (CHI)	7.85	6.55	6.525		7.175	7.8	35.9
55	Danilo Nogueira (BRA)		8.15	9.212		8.812	8.737	34.911
56	Xiao Qin (CHN)		9.8			9.487	9.687	28.974
57	Maximilian Fingerhuth (CHI)		5.525	7.175	9.2		6.7	28.6
58	Marian Drăgulescu (ROM)	9.637			9.662		9.075	28.374
59	Fabian Hambuechen (GER)	9.062			9.637		9.6	28.299
60	Nikolai Kryukov (RUS)		9.012			9.625	9.65	28.287
61	Eichi Sekiguchi (JPN)	9.3			9.512		9.475	28.287
62	Justin Spring (USA)	8.912				9.6	9.562	28.074
63	Isaac Botella Pérez de Landazabal (ESP)	8.925		9.35	9.337			27.612
64	Brandon O'Neill (CAN)	9.512			9.362	8.737		27.611
65	Thomas Andergassen (GER)		9.562	9.162		8.6		27.324
66	Sean Golden (USA)	8.962		9.412	8.9			27.274
67	Ivan Ivankov (BLR)			9.4		9.462	8.312	27.174
68	Evgeni Bogonosyuk (UKR)	8.4			9.275		9.3	26.975
69	Anatoli Vasiliev (RUS)	8.475			8.975		9.437	26.887
70	Robert Juckel (GER)		8.55	9.162			9.162	26.874
71	Damian Istria (AUS)	7.95			9.287		9.612	26.849
72	Alin Sandu Jivan (ROM)	7.837		9.225	9.512			26.574
73	Andrey Isayev (UKR)			8.825	8.7	8.937		26.462
74	Enrico Pozzo (ITA)	8.812	8.074				9.375	26.261
75	Samuel Piasecký (SVK)	8.812				8.7	8.6	26.112
76	James Brochero (COL)	8.525		8.175	9			25.7
77	Marko Brez (CRO)			7.575	8.687		9.337	25.599
78	Tomás González (CHI)	8.587			9.375	7.512		25.474
79	Ewoudt Van Der Linde (RSA)				8.7	8.187	8.075	24.962
80	Gerhard Swiegers (RSA)	8.1			8.675		7.625	24.4
81	Troy Sender (RSA)	8.162	7.862			8		24.024
82	Mohamed Serour (EGY)		6.725		9.45		7.525	23.7
83	Valeri Goncharov (UKR)					9.7	9.675	19.375
84	Yann Cucherat (FRA)					9.687	9.65	19.337
85	Takehiro Kashima (JPN)		9.725			9.487		19.212
86	Xiaopeng Li (CHN)				9.475	9.662		19.137
87	Matteo Angioletti (ITA)			9.487	9.6			19.087
88	Róbert Gál (HUN)	9.512			9.5			19.012
89	Yewki Tomita (USA)		9.337				9.425	18.762
90	Prashanth Sellathurai (AUS)		9.662	9.087				18.749
91	Diego Hypólito (BRA)	9.3			9.362			18.662
92	Filip Yanev (BUL)				9.55		9.1	18.65
93	Ilia Giorgadze (GEO)			9.212		9.4		18.612
94	Huang Che-Kuei (TPE)		9.475				8.95	18.425
95	Patrick Dominguez (SUI)	8.875			9.375			18.25
96	Raphaël Wignanitz (FRA)	8.625			9.6			18.225
97	Kim Ji-Hoon (KOR)		9.587				8.575	18.162
98	Anton Golotsutskov (RUS)	8.587			9.537			18.124
99	Ioan Silviu Suciu (ROM)		9.637			8.4		18.037
100	Samuel Offord (AUS)			8.75	9.237			17.987
101	Manuel Carballo (ESP)					9.65	8.3	17.95
102	Lai Kuo-Cheng (TPE)			8.925	8.937			17.862
103	Marius Daniel Urzica (ROM)		9.025			8.7		17.725
104	Philippe Rizzo (AUS)					9.6	8.1	17.7
105	Igor Cassina (ITA)		8.1				9.587	17.687
106	Konstantinos Barmpakis (GRE)	8.425			8.987			17.412
107	Christoph Schaerer (SUI)		8.05				9.337	17.387
108	Ruslan Sugraliyev (KAZ)					9.087	8.25	17.337
109	Pavel Gofman (ISR)	8.7				8.625		17.325
110	Lin Hsiang-Wei (TPE)		8.475	8.775				17.25
111	Alberto Busnari (ITA)		8.725				8.45	17.175
112	Matthew Cosgrave (IRL)	8.25			8.912			17.162
113	Marcel Nguyen (GER)	7.55				9.512		17.062
114	Ivica Bago (CRO)	7.775			9.125			16.9
115	Roman Zozulia (UKR)			9.362		7.275		16.637
116	Christos Lympanovnos (GRE)		7.425	8.562	0			15.987
117	Alen Dimic (SLO)		7.225				8.5	15.725
118	Maxim Deviatovski (RUS)		8.237			7.362		15.599
119	Vasileios Tsolakidis (GRE)					9.737	9.737	
119	Mitja Petkovšek (SLO)					9.737		9.737
121	Zhang Hongtao (CHN)		9.712					9.712
121	Leszek Blanik (POL)				9.712			9.712
123	Krisztián Berki (HUN)		9.7					9.7
124	Vlasios Maras (GRE)						9.687	9.687
125	Yang Tae-Young (KOR)					9.662		9.662
125	Yuri van Gelder (NED)			9.662				9.662
127	Jason Gatson (USA)					9.65		9.65
128	Johan Mounard (FRA)					9.637		9.637
128	Alexander Safoshkin (RUS)			9.637				9.637
130	Alexei Ihnatovich (BLR)		9.625					9.625
130	Robert Seligman (CRO)		9.625					9.625
132	Víctor Cano (ESP)		9.612					9.612
132	Matteo Morandi (ITA)			9.612				9.612
132	Evgeni Sapronenko (LAT)				9.612			9.612
132	Aljaž Pegan (SLO)						9.612	9.612
136	Chen Yibing (CHN)			9.587				9.587
136	Yan Mingyong (CHN)			9.587				9.587
138	Andrea Coppolino (ITA)			9.575				9.575
139	Tatsuya Yamada (JPN)			9.55				9.55
140	Danny Rodrigues (FRA)			9.537				9.537
141	Dimosthenis Tampakos (GRE)			9.525				9.525
142	Yordan Yovchev (BUL)			9.512				9.512
142	Kai Wen Tan (USA)			9.512				9.512
142	Regulo Carmona (VEN)			9.512				9.512
145	Andreu Vivó (ESP)					9.487		9.487
145	Olexander Vorobyov (UKR)			9.487				9.487
147	Vitali Nakonechny (UKR)		9.475					9.475
148	Gervasio Deferr (ESP)				9.412			9.412
149	Irodotos Georgallas (CYP)			9.35				9.35
149	Olli Torkkel (FIN)			9.35				9.35
151	Matthias Fahrig (GER)				9.325			9.325
152	Lin Yung-Hsi (TPE)			9.312				9.312
153	Kim Seung-Il (KOR)					9.262		9.262
154	Igors Vihrovs (LAT)						9.25	9.25
155	Fatah Ait Saada (ALG)			9.212				9.212
156	Marijo Možnik (CRO)						9.1	9.1
157	Thomas Pichler (AUS)	9.05						9.05
158	Erik Revelinsh (LAT)			9.037				9.037
159	Huang Yi-Hsueh (TPE)				9			9
160	David Hirschorn (DEN)			8.987				8.987
161	Sajo Bertoncelj (SLO)		8.837					8.837
162	Louis Smith (GBR)		8.762					8.762
163	Alexei Sinkevich (BLR)				8.725			8.725
163	Walid Said Eldariny (EGY)			8.725				8.725
163	Ivan Gorbunovs (LAT)	8.725						8.725
166	David Vyoral (CZE)	8.687						8.687
167	Waldo Cottle (RSA)			8.637				8.637
168	Runar Alexandersson (ISL)		8.6					8.6
168	Min Ho-Dae (KOR)	8.6						8.6
170	Yu Hung-Pin (TPE)		8.525					8.525
171	Sin Seob (KOR)			8.425				8.425
172	Sid Ali Ferdjani (ALG)		8.175					8.175
173	Luis Vargas (PUR)		8.1					8.1
174	Jari Monkkonen (FIN)						8.025	8.025
175	Denis Zbickis (LAT)		7.575					7.575
176	Werner Grobler (RSA)		7.425					7.425
177	Riku Koivunen (FIN)		6.925					6.925

=== All-Around Final ===
Rank	Gymnast	Floor (gymnastics)	Pommel horse	Rings (gymnastics)	Vault (gymnastics)	Parallel bars	Horizontal bar	Total
1st place, gold medalist(s)	Hiroyuki Tomita (JPN)	9.137	9.612	9.562	9.500	9.550	9.337	56.698
2nd place, silver medalist(s)	Hisashi Mizutori (JPN)	9.437	8.325	9.325	9.637	9.325	9.300	55.349
3rd place, bronze medalist(s)	Denis Savenkov (BLR)	9.337	8.925	9.075	9.325	9.275	9.175	55.112
4	Rafael Martínez (ESP)	9.125	8.250	9.262	9.262	9.537	9.512	54.948
5	Sergey Khorokhordin (RUS)	8.737	9.250	9.025	9.462	9.025	9.237	54.736
6	Răzvan Șelariu (ROU)	8.325	8.962	9.400	9.562	8.900	9.287	54.436
7	Liang Fuliang (CHN)	9.512	9.162	8.212	9.362	8.850	9.150	54.248
8	Dmitri Savitski (BLR)	8.850	8.100	9.237	9.337	9.150	9.225	53.899
9	Kim Dae-eun (KOR)	9.212	7.837	9.400	8.900	8.862	9.387	53.598
10	Eugen Spiridonov (GER)	8.700	9.362	8.825	9.237	8.825	8.412	53.361
11	Epke Zonderland (NED)	8.412	8.812	8.100	9.250	9.275	9.262	53.111
12	Luis Rivera (PUR)	8.650	9.487	9.262	9.350	8.062	8.137	52.948
13	Nicolas Boeschenstein (SUI)	9.037	7.375	8.775	9.300	9.062	9.125	52.674
14	Anton Fokin (UZB)	8.512	8.250	8.325	9.400	9.387	8.400	52.274
15	Jeffrey Wammes (NED)	8.487	7.687	8.412	9.575	8.625	9.387	52.173
16	Claudio Capelli (SUI)	8.825	8.475	8.512	8.525	8.462	8.412	51.211
17	Yernar Yerimbetov (KAZ)	8.237	8.262	8.700	9.450	9.362	7.125	51.136
18	Sami Aalto (FIN)	8.562	8.750	8.550	8.912	8.262	8.087	51.123
19	Joshua Jefferis (AUS)	8.512	6.925	9.250	9.075	8.637	8.637	51.036
20	Todd Thornton (USA)	7.450	8.837	8.837	9.175	7.787	8.862	50.948
21	Ross Brewer (GBR)	8.162	9.137	8.037	8.962	7.737	8.387	50.422
22	Shu Wai Ng (MAS)	9.100	7.800	8.975	8.825	7.925	7.350	49.975
23	Mosiah Rodrigues (BRA)	8.150	7.087	7.875	9.275	8.150	9.350	49.887
24	Ildar Valeev (KAZ)	8.462	8.387	9.437	8.625	8.162	6.700	49.773

=== Floor Exercise ===
Rank	Gymnast	Total
1st place, gold medalist(s)	Diego Hypólito (BRA)	9.675
2nd place, silver medalist(s)	Brandon O'Neill (CAN)	9.625
3rd place, bronze medalist(s)	Róbert Gál (HUN)	9.587
3rd place, bronze medalist(s)	Liang Fuliang (CHN)	9.587
5	Jeffrey Wammes (NED)	9.537
6	Eichi Sekiguchi (JPN)	9.437
7	Marian Drăgulescu (ROU)	9.212
8	Hisashi Mizutori (JPN)	9.125

=== Pommel Horse ===
Rank	Gymnast	Total
1st place, gold medalist(s)	Xiao Qin (CHN)	9.850
2nd place, silver medalist(s)	Ioan Suciu (ROU)	9.700
3rd place, bronze medalist(s)	Takehiro Kashima (JPN)	9.687
4	Alexei Ihnatovich (BLR)	9.650
4	Krisztián Berki (HUN)	9.650
6	Zhang Hongtao (CHN)	9.475
7	Prashanth Sellathurai (AUS)	9.037
8	Hiroyuki Tomita (JPN)	8.637

=== Rings ===
Rank	Gymnast	Total
1st place, gold medalist(s)	Yuri van Gelder (NED)	9.725
2nd place, silver medalist(s)	Alexander Safoshkin (RUS)	9.712
3rd place, bronze medalist(s)	Matteo Morandi (ITA)	9.662
4	Tatsuya Yamada (JPN)	9.612
5	Danny Rodrigues (FRA)	9.600
6	Andrea Coppolino (ITA)	9.550
7	Yan Mingyong (CHN)	9.537
8	Chen Yibing (CHN)	9.462

=== Vault ===
Rank	Gymnast	Vault 1	Vault 2	Total
1st place, gold medalist(s)	Marian Drăgulescu (ROU)	9.750	9.637	9.693
2nd place, silver medalist(s)	Leszek Blanik (POL)	9.500	9.675	9.587
3rd place, bronze medalist(s)	Alin Jivan (ROU)	9.500	9.650	9.575
4	Anton Golotsutskov (RUS)	9.537	9.600	9.568
5	Eichi Sekiguchi (JPN)	9.412	9.537	9.474
6	Filip Yanev (BUL)	9.612	9.112	9.362
7	Evgeni Sapronenko (LAT)	9.087	9.425	9.256
8	Jeffrey Wammes (NED)	9.412	8.787	9.099

=== Parallel Bars ===
Rank	Gymnast	Total
1st place, gold medalist(s)	Mitja Petkovšek (SLO)	9.700
2nd place, silver medalist(s)	Li Xiaopeng (CHN)	9.675
3rd place, bronze medalist(s)	Yann Cucherat (FRA)	9.662
4	Valeriy Honcharov (UKR)	9.575
5	Manuel Carballo (ESP)	9.387
6	Vasileios Tsolakidis (GRE)	8.450
7	Jason Gatson (USA)	8.375
8	Yang Tae-Young (KOR)	5.987

=== Horizontal Bar ===
Rank	Gymnast	Total
1st place, gold medalist(s)	Aljaž Pegan (SLO)	9.662
2nd place, silver medalist(s)	Yann Cucherat (FRA)	9.650
3rd place, bronze medalist(s)	Valeriy Honcharov (UKR)	9.637
4	Fabian Hambuechen (GER)	9.625
5	Vlasios Maras (GRE)	9.562
6	Xiao Qin (CHN)	9.362
7	Damian Istria (AUS)	8.737
8	Hiroyuki Tomita (JPN)	8.475

== Women ==
=== Qualification ===
Rank	Team	Vault (gymnastics)	Uneven bars	Balance beam	Floor (gymnastics)	Total
1	Nastia Liukin (USA)	9.125	9.562	9.262	9.475	37.424 Q
2	Chellsie Memmel (USA)	9.3	9.55	9.2	9.362	37.412 Q
3	Monette Russo (AUS)	9.2	9.4	9.45	9.212	37.262 Q
4	Beth Tweddle (GBR)	9.175	9.537	8.8	9.425	36.937 Q
5	Isabelle Severino (FRA)	9.162	9.4	9.087	9.212	36.861 Q
6	Elena Zamolodchikova (RUS)	9.375	9.075	8.8	9.412	36.662 Q
7	Émilie Le Pennec (FRA)	9.175	8.525	9.112	9.437	36.249 Q
8	Anna Pavlova (RUS)	9.337	8.362	9.35	9.125	36.174 Q
9	Suzanne Harmes (NED)	8.912	9.15	8.562	9.225	35.849 Q
10	Kyoko Oshima (JPN)	8.712	9.237	8.975	8.9	35.824 Q
11	Zhang Yufei (CHN)	8.387	9.362	8.687	9.3	35.736 Q
12	Daria Bijak (GER)	9.125	8.925	8.825	8.725	35.600 Q
13	Monica Bergamelli (ITA)	8.875	8.975	8.575	8.962	35.387 Q
14	Florica Leonida (ROM)	8.975	9.287	8.137	8.85	35.249 Q
15	Joanna Skowrońska (POL)	9.175	8.987	8.25	8.8	35.212 Q
16	Marina Proskurina (UKR)	9.075	8.725	8.925	8.475	35.200 Q
17	Ariella Käslin (SUI)	9.125	8.875	8.337	8.737	35.074 Q
18	Daniele Hypólito (BRA)	8.412	9.275	8.187	9.087	34.961 Q
19	Marta Pihan (POL)	9	8.775	8.675	8.462	34.912 Q
20	Melanie Marti (SUI)	9.087	9.3	7.987	8.375	34.749 Q
21	Zhang Nan (CHN)	8.975	7.4	9.15	8.912	34.437 Q
22	Stefani Bismpikou (GRE)	8.7	8.862	8.225	8.625	34.412 Q
23	Loes Linders (NED)	8.875	8.575	8.9	7.875	34.225 Q
24	Shavahn Church (GBR)	9.125	9.225	7.225	8.562	34.137 Q
25	Lenika de Simone (ESP)	8.712	8.962	7.562	8.875	34.111 R
26	Daria Sarkhosh (ITA)	8.812	8.287	8.3	8.487	33.886 R
27	Olga Sherbatykh (UKR)	9.1	8.712	8.712	7.262	33.786 R
28	Kim Bui (GER)	8.912	8.587	7.662	8.437	33.598 R
29	Verona van de Leur (NED)	8.925	8.737	7.95	7.975	33.587
30	Veronica Wagner (SWE)	8.812	8.312	8.35	8.062	33.536
31	Nikolina Tankoucheva (BUL)	8.837	8.487	7.687	8.225	33.236
32	Linda Stämpfli (SUI)	8.787	8.837	7.625	7.9	33.149
33	Carina Hasenöhrl (AUT)	8.887	8.625	7.25	8.237	32.999
34	Sandra Mayer (AUT)	8.875	8.412	7.237	8.412	32.936
35	Kim Hyo-bin (KOR)	8.512	7.95	8.525	7.937	32.924
36	Jelena Zanevskaja (LTU)	8.737	8.325	7.5	8.275	32.837
37	Kateřina Marešová (CZE)	8.95	7.887	7.55	8.175	32.562
38	Vered Finkel (ISR)	8.8	8.012	8.087	7.612	32.511
39	Tina Erceg (CRO)	8.712	8.637	6.687	8.425	32.461
40	Katie Slader (IRL)	8.475	7.675	8.262	7.862	32.274
41	Annamari Maaranen (FIN)	8.687	7.925	7.537	8	32.149
42	Belinda Castles (NZL)	7.887	8.437	7.55	8.162	32.036
43	Irina Sirutz (BLR)	8.45	8.5	7.35	7.6	31.9
44	Alice Barnett (NZL)	8.837	8.137	6.75	7.962	31.686
45	Lara Marx (LUX)	9.075	7.725	6.912	7.962	31.674
46	Rinette Whelpton (RSA)	8.537	7.625	6.625	8.275	31.062
47	Irina Zenkova (LAT)	8.775	7.037	7.262	7.9	30.974
48	Mira Laitila (FIN)	8.3	7.875	6.787	7.962	30.924
49	Bae Mul-eum (KOR)	8.787	7.412	6.7	7.975	30.874
50	Zuzana Sekerová (SVK)	8.887	8.012	5.725	8.187	30.811
51	Lu Hsing-Yi (TPE)	8.337	7.975	6.6	7.062	29.974
52	Rachel Forde (IRL)	7.825	6.7	7.637	7.712	29.874
53	Simona Castro (CHI)	8.112	7.725	6.737	7.2	29.774
54	Liudmila Dmitranitsa (BLR)	8.137	7.725	5.862	7.912	29.636
55	Spidola Martinsone (LAT)	8.25	6.525	7	7.462	29.237
56	Oksana Chusovitina (UZB)	9.362	8.987	8.962		27.311
57	Alicia Sacramone (USA)	9.45		7.837	9.5	26.787
58	Manami Ishizaka (JPN)	8.312	9.112		8.687	26.111
59	Ayaka Sahara (JPN)	8.737		8.525	8.762	26.024
60	Nadzeya Vysotskaya (BLR)	9.062		8.262	8.425	25.749
61	Martina Castro (CHI)	8.562		6.937	7.237	22.736
62	Ursula Botha (RSA)		7.6	7.125	7.85	22.575
63	Fan Ye (CHN)		9.475	9.55		19.025
64	Cătălina Ponor (ROM)			9.562	9.2	18.762
65	Cheng Fei (CHN)	9.662			8.637	18.299
66	Mayu Kuroda (JPN)		9.437	8.862		18.299
67	Elyse Hopfner-Hibbs (CAN)		9.362	8.787		18.149
68	Yulia Lozhechko (RUS)			9.337	8.812	18.149
69	Imogen Cairns (GBR)	9.187			8.962	18.149
70	Lee Sul (KOR)	8.7	8.825			17.525
71	Danushka Wijerathna (SRI)	7.125		4.287	5.862	17.274
72	Marine Debauve (FRA)		8.737	8.312		17.049
73	Dariya Zgoba (UKR)		8.6	8.1		16.7
74	Camila Comin (BRA)		8.812	7.862		16.674
75	Olivia Jobsis (NZL)	8.4			7.625	16.025
76	Chiang Pi-Hsuan (TPE)			7.387	7.95	15.337
77	Veronika Adamská (SVK)		8.275	6.962		15.237
78	Sarah Miller (NZL)		8.35	6.875		15.225
79	Tal Liak (ISR)		7.7	7.462		15.162
80	Baek Hwa-seung (KOR)			7.512	7.175	14.687
81	Wu Ling-Yi (TPE)	8.8		5.862		14.662
82	Marcela Alvarez (CHI)	0	6.225		7.687	13.912
83	Carolina Alarcón (CHI)		6.15	6.212		12.362
84	Daiane dos Santos (BRA)				9.55	9.55
85	Polina Miller (RUS)		9.437			9.500
86	Jana Bieger (USA)		9.412			9.412
87	Jana Šikulová (CZE)		9.337			9.337
88	Olivia Vivian (AUS)		9.312			9.312
89	Alina Kozich (UKR)				9.137	9.137
90	Maria Apostolidi (GRE)			8.625		8.625
91	Monique Blount (AUS)			8.225		8.225
92	Tünde Pentek (HUN)				8.137	8.137
93	Bojana Vrščaj (SLO)				8.125	8.125
94	Tanja Gratt (AUT)		7.6			7.6
95	Lin Chia-Ying (TPE)		7.125			7.125

=== All-Around Final ===
Rank	Gymnast	Vault (gymnastics)	Uneven bars	Balance beam	Floor (gymnastics)	Total
1st place, gold medalist(s)	Chellsie Memmel (USA)	9.325	9.537	9.425	9.537	37.824
2nd place, silver medalist(s)	Nastia Liukin (USA)	9.137	9.587	9.587	9.512	37.823
3rd place, bronze medalist(s)	Monette Russo (AUS)	9.187	9.362	9.362	9.387	37.298
4	Beth Tweddle (GBR)	9.162	9.512	8.737	9.525	36.936
5	Émilie Le Pennec (FRA)	9.212	9.512	8.725	9.225	36.674
6	Florica Leonida (ROU)	9.050	9.375	8.975	9.075	36.475
7	Anna Pavlova (RUS)	9.350	8.600	9.362	9.075	36.387
8	Daria Bijak (GER)	9.112	8.825	8.875	8.900	35.712
9	Daniele Hypólito (BRA)	8.425	9.050	9.225	9.000	35.700
10	Suzanne Harmes (NED)	8.987	9.125	8.312	9.125	35.549
11	Marina Proskurina (UKR)	8.550	9.025	9.012	8.812	35.399
12	Melanie Marti (SUI)	8.762	9.387	8.350	8.862	35.361
13	Monica Bergamelli (ITA)	8.762	9.112	8.737	8.650	35.261
14	Lenika de Simone (ESP)	8.775	8.912	8.350	8.825	34.862
15	Stefani Bismpikou (GRE)	8.650	8.875	8.750	8.475	34.750
16	Elena Zamolodchikova (RUS)	9.350	8.150	8.350	8.812	34.662
17	Daria Sarkhosh (ITA)	8.687	8.700	8.687	8.587	34.661
18	Marta Pihan (POL)	8.987	8.800	9.175	7.587	34.549
19	Kyoko Oshima (JPN)	8.825	8.487	7.912	9.012	34.236
20	Shavahn Church (GBR)	9.112	8.925	8.112	8.062	34.211
21	Isabelle Severino (FRA)	9.112	7.350	8.800	8.887	34.149
22	Ariella Käslin (SUI)	8.987	8.937	7.962	8.125	34.001
23	Joanna Skowrońska (POL)	9.137	8.800	8.100	7.887	33.924
24	Loes Linders (NED)	8.812	8.662	8.087	7.762	33.323

=== Vault ===
Rank	Gymnast	Vault 1	Vault 2	Total
1st place, gold medalist(s)	Cheng Fei (CHN)	9.725	9.587	9.656
2nd place, silver medalist(s)	Oksana Chusovitina (UZB)	9.437	9.400	9.418
3rd place, bronze medalist(s)	Alicia Sacramone (USA)	9.387	9.437	9.412
4	Elena Zamolodchikova (RUS)	9.287	9.350	9.318
5	Anna Pavlova (RUS)	9.250	9.225	9.237
6	Olga Sherbatykh (UKR)	9.212	9.212	9.212
7	Joanna Skowrońska (POL)	9.150	9.175	9.162
8	Imogen Cairns (GBR)	9.012	8.900	8.956

=== Uneven Bars ===
Rank	Gymnast	S.V.	Total
1st place, gold medalist(s)	Nastia Liukin (USA)	10.0	9.662
2nd place, silver medalist(s)	Chellsie Memmel (USA)	10.0	9.587
3rd place, bronze medalist(s)	Beth Tweddle (GBR)	10.0	9.575
4	Mayu Kuroda (JPN)	10.0	9.525
5	Fan Ye (CHN)	10.0	9.475
6	Polina Miller (RUS)	10.0	9.462
7	Monette Russo (AUS)	10.0	9.412
8	Isabelle Severino (FRA)	8.4	6.787

=== Balance Beam ===
Rank	Gymnast	S.V.	Total
1st place, gold medalist(s)	Nastia Liukin (USA)	10.0	9.612
2nd place, silver medalist(s)	Chellsie Memmel (USA)	10.0	9.512
3rd place, bronze medalist(s)	Cătălina Ponor (ROU)	9.9	9.500
4	Zhang Nan (CHN)	9.9	9.487
5	Monette Russo (AUS)	9.9	9.462
6	Anna Pavlova (RUS)	9.8	8.762
7	Yulia Lozhechko (RUS)	9.7	8.350
8	Fan Ye (CHN)	9.2	8.025

=== Floor Exercise ===
Rank	Gymnast	S.V	pen.	Total
1st place, gold medalist(s)	Alicia Sacramone (USA)	10.0		9.612
2nd place, silver medalist(s)	Nastia Liukin (USA)	9.9		9.425
3rd place, bronze medalist(s)	Suzanne Harmes (NED)	10.0	0.1	9.212
4	Elena Zamolodchikova (RUS)	9.7		9.162
5	Monette Russo (AUS)	9.7		9.100
6	Émilie Le Pennec (FRA)	9.9		8.887
7	Daiane dos Santos (BRA)	9.8		8.837
8	Isabelle Severino (FRA)	9.6		8.625

== Medal count ==
=== Overall ===
Rank	Nation	Gold	Silver	Bronze	Total
1	United States (USA)	4	4	1	9
2	China (CHN)	2	1	1	4
3	Slovenia (SLO)	2	0	0	2
4	Romania (ROU)	1	1	2	4
5	Japan (JPN)	1	1	1	3
6	Netherlands (NED)	1	0	1	2
7	Brazil (BRA)	1	0	0	1
8	France (FRA)	0	1	1	2
9	Canada (CAN)	0	1	0	1
9	Poland (POL)	0	1	0	1
9	Russia (RUS)	0	1	0	1
9	Uzbekistan (UZB)	0	1	0	1
13	Australia (AUS)	0	0	1	1
13	Belarus (BLR)	0	0	1	1
13	Great Britain (GBR)	0	0	1	1
13	Hungary (HUN)	0	0	1	1
13	Italy (ITA)	0	0	1	1
13	Ukraine (UKR)	0	0	1	1
Totals (18 entries)		12	12	13	37

=== Men ===
Rank	Nation	Gold	Silver	Bronze	Total
1	Slovenia	2	0	0	2
2	China	1	1	1	3
2	Japan	1	1	1	3
2	Romania	1	1	1	3
5	Brazil	1	0	0	1
5	Netherlands	1	0	0	1
7	France	0	1	1	2
8	Canada	0	1	0	1
8	Poland	0	1	0	1
8	Russia	0	1	0	1
11	Belarus	0	0	1	1
11	Hungary	0	0	1	1
11	Italy	0	0	1	1
11	Ukraine	0	0	1	1
Totals (14 entries)		7	7	8	22

=== Women ===
Rank	Nation	Gold	Silver	Bronze	Total
1	United States	4	4	1	9
2	China	1	0	0	1
3	Uzbekistan	0	1	0	1
4	Australia	0	0	1	1
4	Great Britain	0	0	1	1
4	Netherlands	0	0	1	1
4	Romania	0	0	1	1
Totals (7 entries)		5	5	5	15
