= 2006 European Artistic Gymnastics Championships =

The 2006 European Artistic Gymnastics Championships can refer to either or both of the following:

- The 26th European Women's Artistic Gymnastics Championships (April 27–30, 2006)
- The 27th European Men's Artistic Gymnastics Championships (May 4–7, 2006)

The championships were held in consecutive weeks in Volos, Greece.
