= 2006 European Men's Artistic Gymnastics Championships =

27th European Men's Artistic Gymnastics Championships
- Location: Volos, Greece
- Dates: 4 to 7 May 2006
- Nations: Members of the European Union of Gymnastics

The 27th European Men's Artistic Gymnastics Championships were held from 4 May to 7 May 2006 in Volos, Greece.

== Medallists ==
Event	Gold	Silver	Bronze
Seniors
Team all-around	Russia; Alexander Safoshkin; Sergei Khorokhordin; Maxim Deviatovski; Anatoli Vasiliev; Anton Golotsutskov	Romania; Marian Drăgulescu; Răzvan Șelariu; Ilie Daniel Popescu; Alin Jivan; Flavius Koczi	Belarus; Ivan Ivankov; Dzianiz Savenkov; Dimitri Savitski; Dmitri Kaspiarovich; Viachaslav Volkav
Floor exercise	(Russia) Anton Golotsutskov	(Romania) Marian Drăgulescu	(Czech Republic) Martin Konečný
Pommel horse	(Romania) Flavius Koczi	(Germany) Eugen Spiridonov	(Ukraine) Olexander Suprun
Rings	(Russia) Alexander Safoshkin	(Bulgaria) Yordan Yovchev	(Italy) Andrea Coppolino
Vault	(Romania) Marian Drăgulescu	(Romania) Alin Jivan	(France) Raphael Wignanitz
Parallel bars	(Slovenia) Mitja Petkovšek	(France) Yann Cucherat	(Belarus) Ivan Ivankov
Horizontal bar	(Greece) Vlasios Maras	(Russia) Sergei Khorokhordin	(Switzerland) Christoph Schaerer
Juniors
Team all-around	Germany; Max Finzel; Brian Gladow; Steve Woitalla; Helge Liebrich; Andreas Bretschneider	Russia; Vladimir Olennikov; Pavel Russinyak; Kirill Ignatenkov; Matvei Petrov; Alexander Balandin	Ukraine; Mykola Kuksenkov; Maxym Ovchynnikov; Konstyantyn Panchenko; Artem Lyubanevich; Viktor Stepanenko
Individual all-around	(Ukraine) Mykola Kuksenkov	(Russia) Vladimir Olennikov	(Germany) Max Finzel
Floor exercise	(Greece) Michail Doulkeridis	(Germany) Steve Woitalla	(Russia) Vladimir Olennikov
Pommel horse	(United Kingdom) Louis Smith	(Russia) Matvei Petrov	(Russia) Vladimir Olennikov
Rings	(France) Samir Aït Saïd	(Russia) Alexandr Balandin	(Germany) Steve Woitalla
Vault	(Spain) Sergio Munoz	(Greece) Michail Doulkeridis	(United Kingdom) Kristian Thomas
Parallel bars	(Germany) Steve Woitalla	(Russia) Pavel Russinyak	(Ukraine) Mykola Kuksenkov
Horizontal bar	(Germany) Max Finzel	(Ukraine) Mykola Kuksenkov	(Russia) Matvei Petrov

=== Medal standings ===
==== Overall ====
Rank	Nation	Gold	Silver	Bronze	Total
1	Russia (RUS)	3	6	3	12
2	Germany (GER)	3	2	2	7
3	Romania (ROU)	2	3	0	5
4	Greece (GRE)	2	1	0	3
5	Ukraine (UKR)	1	1	3	5
6	France (FRA)	1	1	1	3
7	Great Britain (GBR)	1	0	1	2
8	Slovenia (SLO)	1	0	0	1
8	Spain (ESP)	1	0	0	1
10	Bulgaria (BUL)	0	1	0	1
11	Belarus (BLR)	0	0	2	2
12	Czech Republic (CZE)	0	0	1	1
12	Italy (ITA)	0	0	1	1
12	Switzerland (SUI)	0	0	1	1
Totals (14 entries)		15	15	15	45

==== Seniors ====
Rank	Nation	Gold	Silver	Bronze	Total
1	Russia (RUS)	3	1	0	4
2	Romania (ROU)	2	3	0	5
3	Greece (GRE)	1	0	0	1
3	Slovenia (SLO)	1	0	0	1
5	France (FRA)	0	1	1	2
6	Bulgaria (BUL)	0	1	0	1
6	Germany (GER)	0	1	0	1
8	Belarus (BLR)	0	0	2	2
9	Czech Republic (CZE)	0	0	1	1
9	Italy (ITA)	0	0	1	1
9	Switzerland (SUI)	0	0	1	1
9	Ukraine (UKR)	0	0	1	1
Totals (12 entries)		7	7	7	21

==== Juniors ====
Rank	Nation	Gold	Silver	Bronze	Total
1	Germany (GER)	3	1	2	6
2	Ukraine (UKR)	1	1	2	4
3	Greece (GRE)	1	1	0	2
4	Great Britain (GBR)	1	0	1	2
5	France (FRA)	1	0	0	1
5	Spain (ESP)	1	0	0	1
7	Russia (RUS)	0	5	3	8
Totals (7 entries)		8	8	8	24

== Senior results ==
=== Team competition ===
Rank	Team	Floor (gymnastics)	Pommel horse	Rings (gymnastics)	Vault (gymnastics)	Parallel bars	Horizontal bar	Total
1st place, gold medalist(s)	Russia	44.675	42.975	45.475	48.825	45.200	45.075	272.225
1st place, gold medalist(s)	Sergei Khorokhordin	15.250	14.625	–	16.125	15.400	14.900	272.225
1st place, gold medalist(s)	Maxim Deviatovski	–	14.425	14.225	16.175	14.675	15.025	272.225
1st place, gold medalist(s)	Anton Golotsutskov	15.525	13.925	15.025	16.525	–	–	272.225
1st place, gold medalist(s)	Alexander Safoshkin	–	–	16.225	–	15.125	–	272.225
1st place, gold medalist(s)	Anatoli Vasiliev	13.900	–	–	–	–	15.150	272.225
2nd place, silver medalist(s)	Romania	46.425	43.150	43.800	49.300	43.150	44.500	270.325
2nd place, silver medalist(s)	Răzvan Șelariu	15.300	13.875	15.025	16.200	14.550	14.850	270.325
2nd place, silver medalist(s)	Marian Drăgulescu	15.800	–	–	16.725	–	15.000	270.325
2nd place, silver medalist(s)	Alin Jivan	–	–	14.725	16.375	14.175	–	270.325
2nd place, silver medalist(s)	Flavius Koczi	15.325	14.225	–	–	–	14.650	270.325
2nd place, silver medalist(s)	Ilie Daniel Popescu	–	15.050	14.050	–	14.425	–	270.325
3rd place, bronze medalist(s)	Belarus	44.975	41.825	44.900	48.425	45.175	43.675	268.975
3rd place, bronze medalist(s)	Dimitri Savitski	15.150	14.600	14.125	16.300	14.950	13.050	268.975
3rd place, bronze medalist(s)	Ivan Ivankov	–	13.575	15.500	–	15.400	15.450	268.975
3rd place, bronze medalist(s)	Dimitri Kasparovich	–	–	15.275	16.200	14.825	–	268.975
3rd place, bronze medalist(s)	Dzianis Savenkov	15.250	13.650	–	–	–	15.175	268.975
3rd place, bronze medalist(s)	Viachaslav Volkav	14.575	–	–	15.925	–	–	268.975
4	Ukraine	44.100	43.725	45.450	48.400	43.500	42.600	267.775
4	Andrey Isayev	14.675	14.350	14.900	16.025	14.300	–	267.775
4	Olexander Suprun	14.300	14.725	–	16.100	14.200	13.275	267.775
4	Roman Zozulya	–	14.650	15.375	–	15.000	14.675	267.775
4	Evgeni Bogonosyuk	15.125	–	–	16.275	–	14.650	267.775
4	Sergei Vialtsev	–	–	15.175	–	–	–	267.775
5	Italy	42.375	43.400	45.850	47.325	43.275	45.475	267.600
5	Enrico Pozzo	14.625	13.650	–	16.100	14.375	15.075	267.600
5	Igor Cassina	–	14.300	14.125	–	14.200	15.625	267.600
5	Andrea Coppolino	14.300	-	15.950	15.625	–	–	267.600
5	Alberto Busnari	–	15.350	–	–	14.700	14.775	267.600
5	Matteo Angioletti	13.450	–	15.775	15.600	–	–	267.600
6	France	43.625	43.225	42.350	49.100	44.400	43.875	266.575
6	Dimitri Karbanenko	14.600	14.500	14.050	16.225	15.450	15.250	266.575
6	Raphael Wignanitz	14.750	–	13.875	16.525	13.050	–	266.575
6	Thomas Bouhail	14.275	14.200	–	16.350	–	–	266.575
6	Arnaud Willig	–	14.525	14.425	–	–	13.475	266.575
6	Yann Cucherat	–	–	–	–	15.900	15.150	266.575
7	Germany	44.650	43.750	43.175	47.700	44.200	42.350	265.825
7	Fabian Hambüchen	15.275	–	14.100	15.950	15.250	15.000	265.825
7	Eugen Spiridonov	14.750	14.275	–	16.125	14.575	–	265.825
7	Robert Juckel	14.625	14.850	–	15.625	–	12.225	265.825
7	Thomas Andergassen	–	14.625	14.400	–	14.375	–	265.825
7	Robert Weber	–	–	14.675	–	–	15.125	265.825
8	Switzerland	44.300	41.525	43.600	48.175	42.375	44.225	264.200
8	Roger Sager	14.925	12.925	14.650	16.250	13.675	14.625	264.200
8	Claude-Alain Porchet	15.075	–	14.300	15.950	–	14.400	264.200
8	Nicolas Boeschenstein	–	–	14.650	15.975	14.400	–	264.200
8	Claudia Capelli	14.300	14.600	–	–	14.300	–	264.200
8	Christoph Schaerer	–	14.000	–	–	–	15.200	264.200

=== Floor ===
Rank	Gymnast	Total
1st place, gold medalist(s)	Anton Golotsutskov (RUS)	15.600
2nd place, silver medalist(s)	Marian Drăgulescu (ROU)	15.525
3rd place, bronze medalist(s)	Martin Konečný (CZE)	15.475
4	Răzvan Șelariu (ROU)	15.375
5	Claudio Capelli (SUI)	15.050
6	Filip Ude (CRO)	14.900
7	Filip Yanev (BUL)	14.875
8	Enrico Pozzo (ITA)	14.250

=== Pommel horse ===
Rank	Gymnast	Total
1st place, gold medalist(s)	Flavius Koczi (ROU)	15.250
2nd place, silver medalist(s)	Eugen Spiridonov (GER)	14.775
3rd place, bronze medalist(s)	Olexander Suprun (UKR)	14.750
4	Krisztián Berki (HUN)	14.600
5	Ilie Daniel Popescu (ROU)	14.425
6	Filip Ude (CRO)	14.075
7	Alberto Busnari (ITA)	13.775
8	Robert Juckel (GER)	13.450

=== Still rings ===
Rank	Gymnast	Total
1st place, gold medalist(s)	Alexander Safoshkin (RUS)	16.425
2nd place, silver medalist(s)	Yordan Yovchev (BUL)	16.275
3rd place, bronze medalist(s)	Andrea Coppolino (ITA)	16.000
4	Roman Zozulya (UKR)	15.600
5	Matteo Angioletti (ITA)	15.425
6	Dimitri Kasparovich (BLR)	15.275
7	Sergei Vialtsev (UKR)	15.050
8	Thomas Andergassen (GER)	14.950

=== Vault ===
Rank	Gymnast	Vault 1	Vault 2	Total
1st place, gold medalist(s)	Marian Drăgulescu (ROU)	16.725	16.450	16.587
2nd place, silver medalist(s)	Alin Jivan (ROU)	16.275	16.500	16.387
3rd place, bronze medalist(s)	Raphael Wignanitz (FRA)	16.475	16.200	16.337
4	Anton Golotsutskov (RUS)	16.325	16.150	16.237
5	Fabian Hambüchen (GER)	16.250	16.125	16.187
6	Marek Lyszczarz (POL)	15.775	16.075	15.925
7	Isaac Botella Pérez (ESP)	16.350	15.175	15.762
8	Filip Yanev (BUL)	15.600	15.375	15.487

=== Parallel bars ===
Rank	Gymnast	Total
1st place, gold medalist(s)	Mitja Petkovšek (SLO)	16.025
2nd place, silver medalist(s)	Yann Cucherat (FRA)	15.675
3rd place, bronze medalist(s)	Ivan Ivankov (BLR)	15.550
4	Dimitri Karbanenko (FRA)	15.400
5	Dimitri Kasparovich (BLR)	15.375
6	Sergei Khorokhordin (RUS)	15.325
7	Fabian Hambüchen (GER)	15.250
8	Samuel Piasecký (SVK)	14.300

=== Horizontal bar ===
Rank	Gymnast	Total
1st place, gold medalist(s)	Vlasios Maras (GRE)	15.725
2nd place, silver medalist(s)	Sergei Khorokhordin (RUS)	15.550
3rd place, bronze medalist(s)	Christoph Schaerer (SUI)	15.525
4	Yann Cucherat (FRA)	15.150
5	Igor Cassina (ITA)	14.400
6	Epke Zonderland (NED)	14.200
7	Aljaž Pegan (SLO)	14.050
8	Roman Kulesza (POL)	11.750

== Junior results ==
=== Team competition ===
The junior team competition also served as the individual all-around and qualification to the individual event finals.

Rank	Team	Floor (gymnastics)	Pommel horse	Rings (gymnastics)	Vault (gymnastics)	Parallel bars	Horizontal bar	Total
1st place, gold medalist(s)	Germany	44.150	40.400	41.775	47.750	43.675	44.775	262.525
1st place, gold medalist(s)	Max Finzel	14.550	13.475	13.575	15.800	14.600	15.025	262.525
1st place, gold medalist(s)	Brian Gladow	14.850	13.350	13.600	15.625	14.150	15.275	262.525
1st place, gold medalist(s)	Steve Woitalla	14.750	13.050	14.125	15.700	14.925	13.400	262.525
1st place, gold medalist(s)	Helge Liebrich	13.775	13.575	–	16.250	–	14.475	262.525
1st place, gold medalist(s)	Andreas Bretschneider	–	–	14.050	–	13.225	–	262.525
2nd place, silver medalist(s)	Russia	42.775	42.525	42.725	47.625	43.425	43.150	262.225
2nd place, silver medalist(s)	Vladimir Olennikov	14.650	14.425	13.675	16.075	14.400	14.400	262.225
2nd place, silver medalist(s)	Pavel Russinyak	12.875	13.000	13.600	15.825	14.650	14.250	262.225
2nd place, silver medalist(s)	Kirill Ignatenkov	14.400	13.375	–	15.725	13.850	12.675	262.225
2nd place, silver medalist(s)	Matvei Petrov	–	14.725	14.000	–	14.375	14.500	262.225
2nd place, silver medalist(s)	Alexander Balandin	13.725	–	15.050	–	–	–	262.225
3rd place, bronze medalist(s)	Ukraine	42.600	42.775	40.975	47.350	42.675	43.000	259.375
3rd place, bronze medalist(s)	Mykola Kuksenkov	14.750	14.625	14.050	16.100	14.550	14.550	259.375
3rd place, bronze medalist(s)	Maxym Ovchynnikov	13.525	11.875	13.400	16.100	14.075	13.925	259.375
3rd place, bronze medalist(s)	Konstyantyn Panchenko	13.725	14.450	13.525	15.025	–	13.900	259.375
3rd place, bronze medalist(s)	Artem Lyubanevich	14.125	–	–	15.150	14.050	14.525	259.375
3rd place, bronze medalist(s)	Victor Stepanenko	–	13.700	12.925	–	12.975	–	259.375
4	Great Britain	42.550	42.075	39.575	47.425	41.625	42.375	255.625
4	Kristian Thomas	13.900	13.650	13.150	15.850	13.700	14.200	255.625
4	Louis Smith	14.025	14.675	12.600	15.525	13.375	13.850	255.625
4	Sam Hunter	14.150	13.550	–	15.950	13.575	14.275	255.625
4	Kieran Beham	14.375	–	11.625	15.625	–	13.900	255.625
4	Daniel Purvis	–	13.750	13.825	–	14.350	–	255.625
5	Romania	42.075	43.150	40.300	46.975	41.650	41.225	255.375
5	Cosmin Malita	13.925	14.425	13.500	15.800	14.025	13.500	255.375
5	Cristian Bățagă	14.150	13.825	13.250	15.550	13.525	11.900	255.375
5	Andrei Ursache	14.000	14.575	–	15.375	13.475	13.400	255.375
5	Andrei Muntean	11.100	–	13.550	15.625	14.100	14.325	255.375
5	Oprea Bogdan	–	14.150	12.575	–	–	–	255.375
6	Switzerland	42.525	41.800	39.375	46.850	41.850	42.800	255.200
6	Reto Heierli	13.600	13.975	13.925	15.625	14.200	14.325	255.200
6	Pascal Bucher	14.100	13.825	12.825	15.550	13.225	14.050	255.200
6	Lucas Fischer	14.500	–	–	15.675	12.925	14.425	255.200
6	Marc Barmettler	13.925	13.350	12.625	15.550	–	–	255.200
6	Jean-Philippe Hayoz	–	14.000	12.550	–	14.425	14.025	255.200
7	Greece	43.925	38.525	39.975	47.975	41.575	42.325	254.300
7	Xenofon Kosmidis	14.100	13.775	13.325	15.875	13.750	14.225	254.300
7	Michail Doulkeridis	14.850	9.550	12.900	16.300	13.750	14.475	254.300
7	Stravos Kekelos	14.300	12.200	13.300	15.800	–	13.350	254.300
7	Eleftherios Kosmidis	14.775	–	13.350	15.700	13.925	–	254.300
7	Panagiotis Tougkas	–	12.550	–	–	13.900	13.625	254.300
8	France	42.000	39.000	41.775	47.400	41.050	41.975	253.200
8	Christoph Pinto Alvez	14.025	13.350	13.625	15.850	13.525	13.850	253.200
8	Samir Aït Saïd	14.150	11.500	15.475	15.550	13.500	12.300	253.200
8	Vincent Jamet	13.725	–	11.700	15.825	13.475	13.875	253.200
8	Kevin Antoniotti	13.825	12.675	–	15.725	–	14.250	253.200
8	Jules Michel	–	12.975	12.675	–	14.025	–	253.200

=== Floor exercise ===
Rank	Gymnast	Total
1st place, gold medalist(s)	Mikhail Doulkeridis (GRE)	15.300
2nd place, silver medalist(s)	Steve Woitalla (GER)	14.950
3rd place, bronze medalist(s)	Vladimir Olennikov (RUS)	14.650
4	Eleftherios Kosmidis (GRE)	14.625
5	Brian Gladow (GER)	14.600
6	Mykola Kuksenkov (UKR)	14.525
7	Lucas Fischer (SUI)	14.450
8	Andrea Cingolani (ITA)	14.125

=== Pommel horse ===
Rank	Gymnast	Total
1st place, gold medalist(s)	Louis Smith (GBR)	14.950
2nd place, silver medalist(s)	Matvei Petrov (RUS)	14.675
3rd place, bronze medalist(s)	Vladimir Olennikov (RUS)	14.625
4	Konstyantyn Panchenko (UKR)	14.600
5	Donna-Donny Truyens (BEL)	14.550
6	Cosmin Malita (ROU)	14.200
7	Mykola Kuksenkov (UKR)	13.525
8	Andrei Ursache (ROU)	13.000

=== Still rings ===
Rank	Gymnast	Total
1st place, gold medalist(s)	Samir Aït Saïd (FRA)	15.525
2nd place, silver medalist(s)	Alexandr Balandin (RUS)	15.125
3rd place, bronze medalist(s)	Steve Woitalla (GER)	14.700
4	Gustavo Simoes (POR)	14.400
5	Mykola Kuksenkov (UKR)	14.125
6	Matvei Petrov (RUS)	14.050
7	Reto Heierli (SUI)	14.000
8	Andreas Bretschneider (GER)	12.375

=== Vault ===
Rank	Gymnast	Vault 1	Vault 2	Total
1st place, gold medalist(s)	Sergio Munoz (ESP)	16.250	16.250	16.250
2nd place, silver medalist(s)	Michail Doulkeridis (GRE)	16.150	15.800	15.975
3rd place, bronze medalist(s)	Kristian Thomas (GBR)	16.075	15.825	15.950
4	Gabor Kentner (HUN)	15.775	16.025	15.900
5	Helge Liebrich (GER)	16.150	15.575	15.862
6	Maxym Ovchynnikov (UKR)	15.850	15.400	15.625
7	Mykola Kuksenkov (UKR)	14.975	15.675	15.325
8	Vladimir Olennikov (RUS)	16.050	13.675	14.862

=== Parallel bars ===
Rank	Gymnast	Total
1st place, gold medalist(s)	Steve Woitalla (GER)	14.775
2nd place, silver medalist(s)	Pavel Russinyak (RUS)	14.600
3rd place, bronze medalist(s)	Mykola Kuksenkov (UKR)	14.500
4	Vladimir Olennikov (RUS)	14.450
5	Jean-Philippe Hayoz (SUI)	14.425
6	Max Finzel (GER)	14.275
7	Daniel Purvis (GBR)	14.200
8	Christian Bazan (ESP)	13.025

=== Horizontal bar ===
Rank	Gymnast	Total
1st place, gold medalist(s)	Max Finzel (GER)	14.975
2nd place, silver medalist(s)	Mykola Kuksenkov (UKR)	14.675
3rd place, bronze medalist(s)	Matvei Petrov (RUS)	14.400
4	F. Artur Duka (HUN)	14.375
5	Michail Doulkeridis (GRE)	14.275
6	Brian Gladow (GER)	14.025
7	Artem Lyubanevich (UKR)	13.800
8	Timo Niemela (FIN)	13.400
