= Róbert Gál =

Hungarian gymnast

- Full name: Róbert Gál
- Born: March 30, 1979 (age 47) Budapest
- Height: 166 cm (5 ft 5 in)

Gymnastics career
- Discipline: Men's artistic gymnastics
- Country represented: Hungary
- Club: KSI
- Head coach: Istvan Vereckei
Medal record
Representing Hungary
World Championships
Bronze medal – third place	2005 Melbourne	Floor exercise
European Championships
Bronze medal – third place	2005 Debrecen	Floor Exercise

Róbert Gál (born March 30, 1979, in Budapest) is a Hungarian artistic gymnast. He is the 2005 World bronze medalist on the floor exercise. He represented Hungary at the 2004 Summer Olympics, where he placed 6th in the vault event final.

He has been named to the 2008 Hungarian Olympic Team.
