= Samantha Bayley =

British artistic gymnast (born 1988)

- Born: 10 June 1988 (age 38)

Gymnastics career
- Discipline: Women's artistic gymnastics
- Country represented: Great Britain; (2005)

Samantha Bayley (born 10 June 1988) is a British female artistic gymnast. She represents her nation at international competitions. As a junior, she competed at the 2004 European Women's Artistic Gymnastics Championships. As an elite she competed at the 2005 European Artistic Gymnastics Championships where she reached the final in the vault event.
