= Francesca Benolli =

Italian artistic gymnast

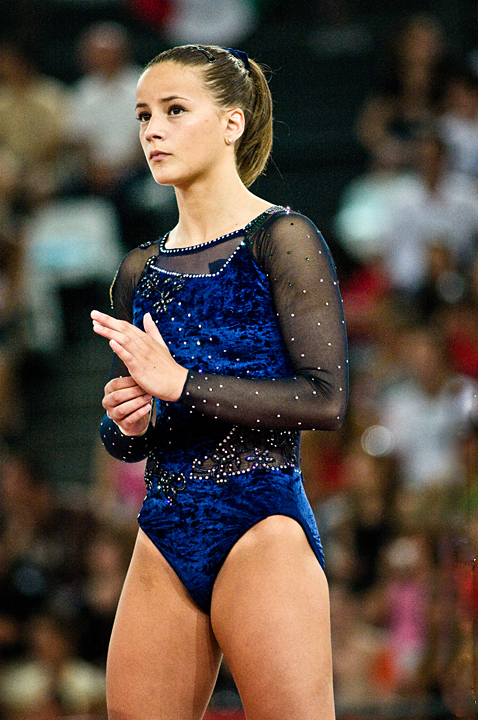

Personal information
- Born: August 26, 1989 (age 37)
- Height: 160 cm (5 ft 3 in)

Gymnastics career
- Discipline: Women's artistic gymnastics
- Country represented: Italy
Medal record
European Championships
Gold medal – first place	2005 Debrecen	Vault
Bronze medal – third place	2008 Clermont-Ferrand	Vault

Francesca Benolli (born 26 August 1989 in Trieste) is an Italian artistic gymnast who competed at her first international competition in 2003.

As a junior gymnast, Benolli was part of the Italian team which won a bronze medal at the 2004 Junior European Championships in Amsterdam. In 2005, Benolli became age eligible for Senior competition and made an immediate impact, winning the 2005 European Vault title at just fifteen as well as respectable fifth-place finishes in both the All Around and Floor exercise finals.

However, Benolli suffered serious injury after this competition, missing both the 2005 and 2006 World Championships. She came back in 2007 and was a member of the Italian team which placed in the top 12 at the World Championships, qualifying them to the 2008 Olympics. In 2008, Benolli won a bronze medal on vault at Europeans and was a member of the Italian team in Beijing.
