= Suzanne Harmes =

Dutch gymnast

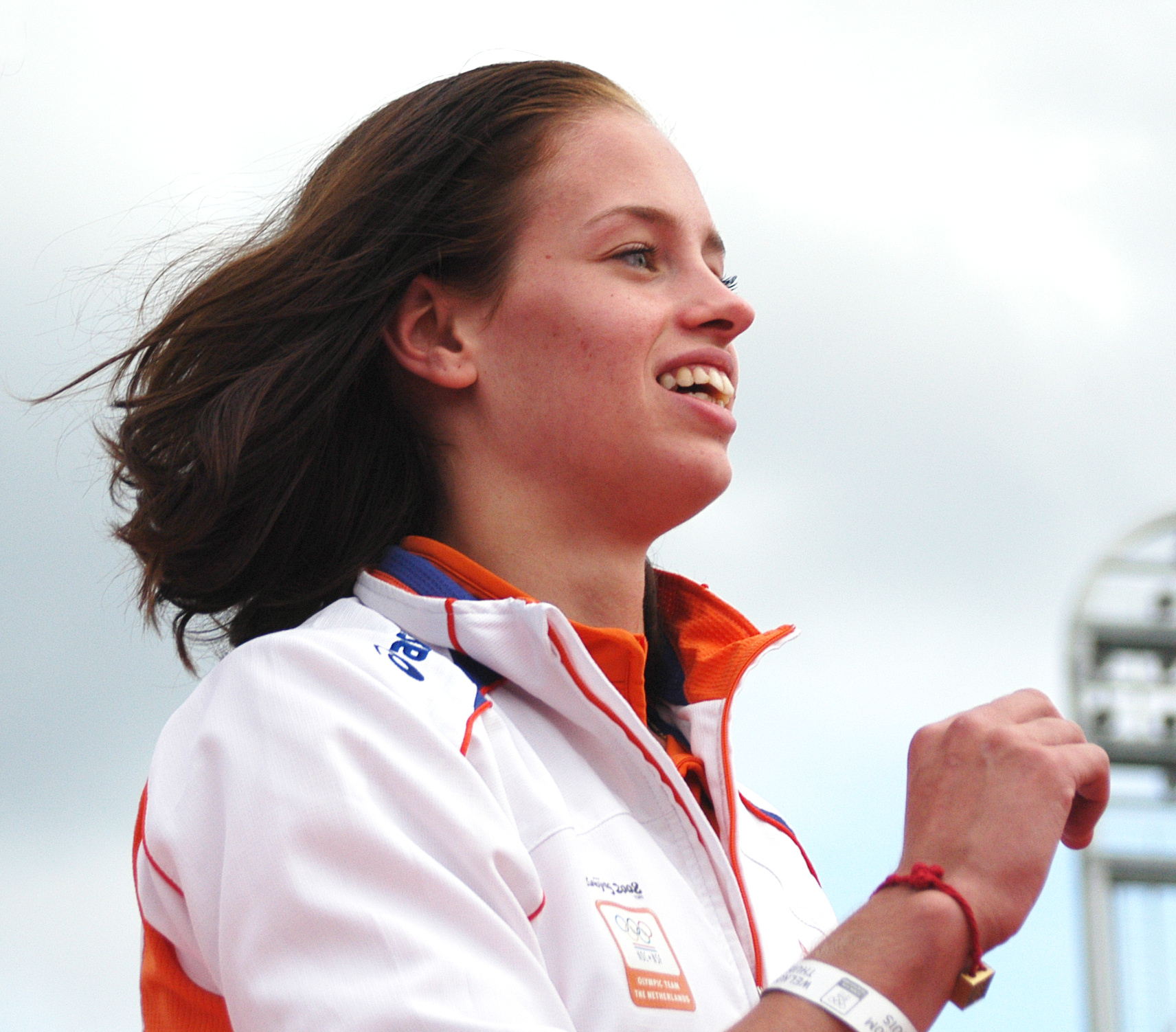
- Harmes in 2008

Personal information
- Full name: Suzanne Helena Johanna Harmes
- Born: 10 January 1986 (age 40) Zoetermeer, Netherlands
- Height: 5 ft 7 in (170 cm)

Gymnastics career
- Discipline: Women's artistic gymnastics
- Country represented: Netherlands
- Retired: 2010
Medal record
World Championships
Bronze medal – third place	2005 Melbourne	Floor
European Championships
Silver medal – second place	2005 Debrecen	Floor
Silver medal – second place	2002 Patras	Team
Summer Universiade
Silver medal – second place	2005 Izmir	All-Around

Suzanne Helena Johanna Harmes (born 10 January 1986 in Zoetermeer) is a Dutch gymnast.

In 2002, she won the silver medal at the European Championships in Patras as a part of the Dutch team alongside Verona van de Leur, Gabriella Wammes, Renske Endel and Monique Nuijten. A year later she became Dutch National Champion for the first time in her career. Harmes represented the Netherlands at the 2004 Summer Olympics. At the 2005 World Championships in Melbourne she won the bronze medal at the floor exercise, finishing behind Alicia Sacramone and Nastia Liukin. Earlier that year she won the gold medal at the Gymnastics World Cup Championships meeting in Maribor. At the same meeting she also won a silver medal at the beam and a bronze medal at vault.

She withdrew from the 2006 World Championship in Aarhus due to pregnancy. On 24 May 2007 Harmes became mother of her first child, son Lugano. She started competing in the sport again and in June 2008 she qualified herself into the Dutch Olympic team for the 2008 Summer Olympics, placing 32nd in qualifications, but did not advance to any finals.
