= Andrea Coppolino =

Italian artistic gymnast

- Born: 19 August 1979 (age 47) Cantù, Como, Italy

Gymnastics career
- Discipline: Men's artistic gymnastics
- Country represented: Italy
Medal record
Men's artistic gymnastics
Representing Italy
World Championships
Bronze medal – third place	2003 Anaheim	Rings
European Championships
Gold medal – first place	2005 Debrecen	Rings
Silver medal – second place	2007 Amsterdam	Rings
Bronze medal – third place	2006 Volos	Rings
Mediterranean Games
Silver medal – second place	2001 Tunis	Team
Silver medal – second place	2001 Tunis	Rings
Silver medal – second place	2005 Almería	Team
Silver medal – second place	2005 Almería	Rings

Andrea Coppolino (born 19 August 1979) is an Italian male artistic gymnast, representing his nation at international competitions. He participated at the 2008 Summer Olympics in Beijing, China. He also competed at world championships, including the 1999 World Artistic Gymnastics Championships, 2001 World Artistic Gymnastics Championships, 2002 World Artistic Gymnastics Championships, 2003 World Artistic Gymnastics Championships, 2005 World Artistic Gymnastics Championships, 2006 World Artistic Gymnastics Championships and 2007 World Artistic Gymnastics Championships.
