= Aleksandr Safoshkin =

Russian artistic gymnast (born 1976)

- Full name: Aleksandr Alekseyevich Safoshkin
- Alternative names: Alexandr, Alexander
- Born: 13 March 1976 (age 50) Rostov-on-Don, Russia
- Height: 155 cm (5 ft 1 in)

Gymnastics career
- Discipline: Men's artistic gymnastics
- Country represented: Russia
- Retired: 2008
Medal record
Men's artistic gymnastics
Representing Russia
World Championships
Silver medal – second place	2005 Melbourne	Rings
Silver medal – second place	2006 Aarhus	Team
European Championships
Gold medal – first place	2004 Ljubljana	Rings
Gold medal – first place	2006 Volos	Team
Gold medal – first place	2006 Volos	Rings
Bronze medal – third place	2005 Debrecen	Rings

Aleksandr Alekseyevich Safoshkin (Note: Russian: Александр Алексеевич Сафошкин) (born 13 March 1976) is a Russian former artistic gymnast. He is the 2004 and 2006 European champion and the 2005 World silver medalist on the rings. He also won a silver medal with the Russian team at the 2006 World Championships and a team gold medal at the 2006 European Championships. He represented Russia at the 2004 Summer Olympics.

== Gymnastics career ==
When he was 19 years old, Safoshkin took a seven-year break from artistic gymnastics to join the Rostov Circus. He was encouraged to return to competition by his former coach due to new rules that allowed apparatus specialists to compete at the Olympic Games. He returned to competition in 2003 and won the rings competition at the Stuttgart World Cup. At the 2004 European Championships, he tied with Dimosthenis Tampakos for the rings title. He also won the rings gold medal at the 2004 Lyon World Cup.

Safoshkin competed at the 2004 Summer Olympics with the Russian team that placed sixth. He advanced into the rings final and placed seventh with a score of 9.750. He won the rings bronze medal at the 2005 European Championships. At the 2005 World Championships, he won the silver medal on the rings by 0.013 points behind Yuri van Gelder.

Safoshkin helped Russia win the team title at the 2006 European Championships, where he also won the rings title. He won a team silver medal at the 2006 World Championships and also placed seventh in the rings final. After these World Championships, he injured his shoulder, which ultimately ended his career. He retired from the sport and began working as a coach for the junior national team.

== Personal life ==
Safoshkin's wife, Yekaterina, is a former rhythmic gymnast, and they have a son.

== See also ==
- List of Olympic male artistic gymnasts for Russia
