= Alin Jivan =

Romanian artistic gymnast

- Full name: Alin Sandu Jivan
- Born: December 2, 1983 (age 42) Reșița

Gymnastics career
- Discipline: Men's artistic gymnastics
- Country represented: Romania
- Club: C.S.A. Steaua Bucharest
- Head coach: Danuţ Grecu
- Assistant coach: Aurelian Georgescu
- Choreographer: Elena Grecu
Medal record
World Championships
Bronze medal – third place	2005 Melbourne	Vault
European Championships
Silver medal – second place	2006 Volos	Vault
Silver medal – second place	2006 Volos	Team

Alin Sandu Jivan (born December 2, 1983) is a Romanian artistic gymnast whose best event is the vault. He is a world and a European medalist on this event.
