= Stefani Bismpikou =

Greek artistic gymnast (born 1988)

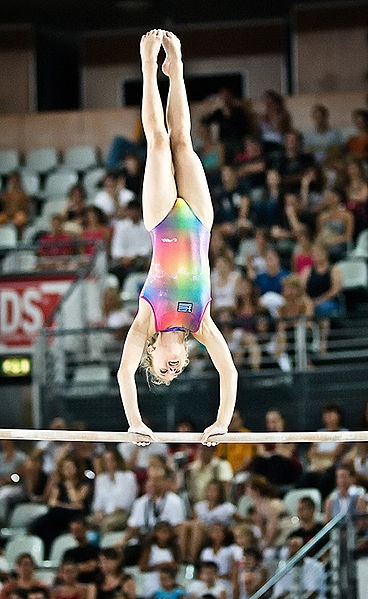
- Stefani Bismpikou at the Mediterraneo Gym Cup July 5th 2008 in Rome

Personal information
- Full name: Stefani Bismpikou
- Born: June 27, 1988 (age 38) Athens, Greece

Gymnastics career
- Discipline: Women's artistic gymnastics
- Country represented: Greece
- Club: F.S. Proteas
- Head coach: Xachizisis Kostas
- Assistant coach: Sioutis Kostas
- Choreographer: Anastasia Donti
Medal record
Representing Greece
European Championships
Bronze medal – third place	2007 Amsterdam	Balance Beam
Mediterranean Games
Bronze medal – third place	2005 Almería	All-Around

Stefani Bismpikou (also spelled Bisbikou; born June 27, 1988) is a Greek artistic gymnast who competed at the 2004 and 2008 Olympics. She is the first Greek female gymnast ever to win a medal at the European Championships, and has also won several medals on the World Cup circuit. Her best apparatus is the balance beam.

== Background ==
Bismpikou was born in Athens, Greece. She has an older sister who is a competitive diver, and two younger brothers who play tennis. Bismpikou began gymnastics in 1992. As a young gymnast, she admired Elena Zamolodchikova of Russia.

== Gymnastics career ==
As a junior, Bismpikou enjoyed a successful career on the European competitive circuit. She made her major senior Gymnastics debut at the 2003 World Championships in Anaheim, California, where she qualified to the Olympics with a score of 34.637. In early 2004, she had a strong showing at the European Championships, placing 12th in the all-around final. Bismpikou represented her country in her hometown of Athens at the 2004 Summer Olympics. There she advanced to the individual all-around where she finished a respectable 15th with a final score of 36.499, almost two full points higher than her World Championships score the year before.

Bismpikou continued to compete in 2005, winning her first World Cup medal, silver on the balance beam, at the French International in 2005. She was 14th in the all-around at European Championships that year, and also was the all-around bronze medalist at the 2005 Mediterranean Games in Almeria, Spain. She began 2006 with a strong showing at the Maribor World Cup in Slovenia, where she was the gold medalist on beam and won two bronze medals on floor exercise and the uneven bars. At the 2006 Europeans in Greece, she was a favourite to win a medal, but fell from the balance beam, handing the title to reigning Olympic Champion Cătălina Ponor.

In 2007, Bismpikou became the first senior Greek gymnast to win a medal at the European Championships when she placed third on the balance beam. This accomplishment won Bismpikou great praise in Greece and she was voted second place in the 2007 Female Greek Athlete of the year awards. Speaking in early 2008, Bismpikou said that she was touched by the award and was pleased her gymnastics efforts were being acknowledged by her fellow Greeks.

At the 2007 World Championships, Bismpikou qualified to represent Greece at the 2008 Olympics. At the Olympics, she participated in the qualifying round of competition, placing 39th overall.

Bismpikou has stated that she still loves gymnastics and hopes to continue after the Olympics. She has also indicated that she plans to pursue university studies to become a nutritionist.
