= Joanna Skowrońska =

Polish gymnast

- Born: 1 August 1982 (age 44) Kamienna Góra, Poland

Gymnastics career
- Discipline: Women's artistic gymnastics
- Country represented: Poland (1998–2006)
Medal record
Representing Poland
Women's artistic gymnastics
Event	1st	2nd	3rd
FIG World Cup Finals	0	0	1
FIG World Cup Qualifiers	0	2	0
Summer Universiade	0	1	1
Total	0	2	2
Summer Universiade
Silver medal – second place	2001 Beijing	Vault
Bronze medal – third place	2003 Daegu	Vault

Joanna Skowrońska (born 1 August 1982) is a former artistic gymnast who represented Poland in international competitions. She is a 2-time Universiade medalist from 2001 and 2003 and a 6-time Polish national all-around champion (1996, 1999-2001, 2003, 2006). She represented Poland at the 2000 Summer Olympic Games in Sydney.

She also competed at the World Artistic Gymnastics Championships in 1999, 2001, 2002, 2003, 2005, 2006
