= Răzvan Șelariu =

Romanian artistic gymnast

- Full name: Răzvan Dorin Șelariu
- Born: 2 November 1983 (age 42) Reșița, Romania

Gymnastics career
- Discipline: Men's artistic gymnastics
- Country represented: Romania
- Gym: CSS Reșița
- Head coach: Danuţ Grecu
- Assistant coach: Ștefan Gal
Medal record
Olympic Games
Bronze medal – third place	2004 Athens	Team all-around
European Championships
Gold medal – first place	2004 Ljubljana	Team all-around
Silver medal – second place	2005 Debrecen	All-around
Silver medal – second place	2005 Debrecen	Floor exercise
Silver medal – second place	2006 Volos	Team all-around
Silver medal – second place	2008 Lausanne	Floor exercise
Bronze medal – third place	2005 Debrecen	Vault
Bronze medal – third place	2008 Lausanne	Team all-around

Răzvan Dorin Șelariu (born 2 November 1983 in Reșița) is a Romanian artistic gymnast. With the Romanian team, he won the bronze medal at the team all-around. As an individual, he won five medals at several European championships.

== Awards ==
Șelariu was voted the Romanian Gymnastics Federation's Athlete of the Year 2008. He shared the title with Sandra Izbaşa.
