= Cătălina Ponor =

Romanian artistic gymnast

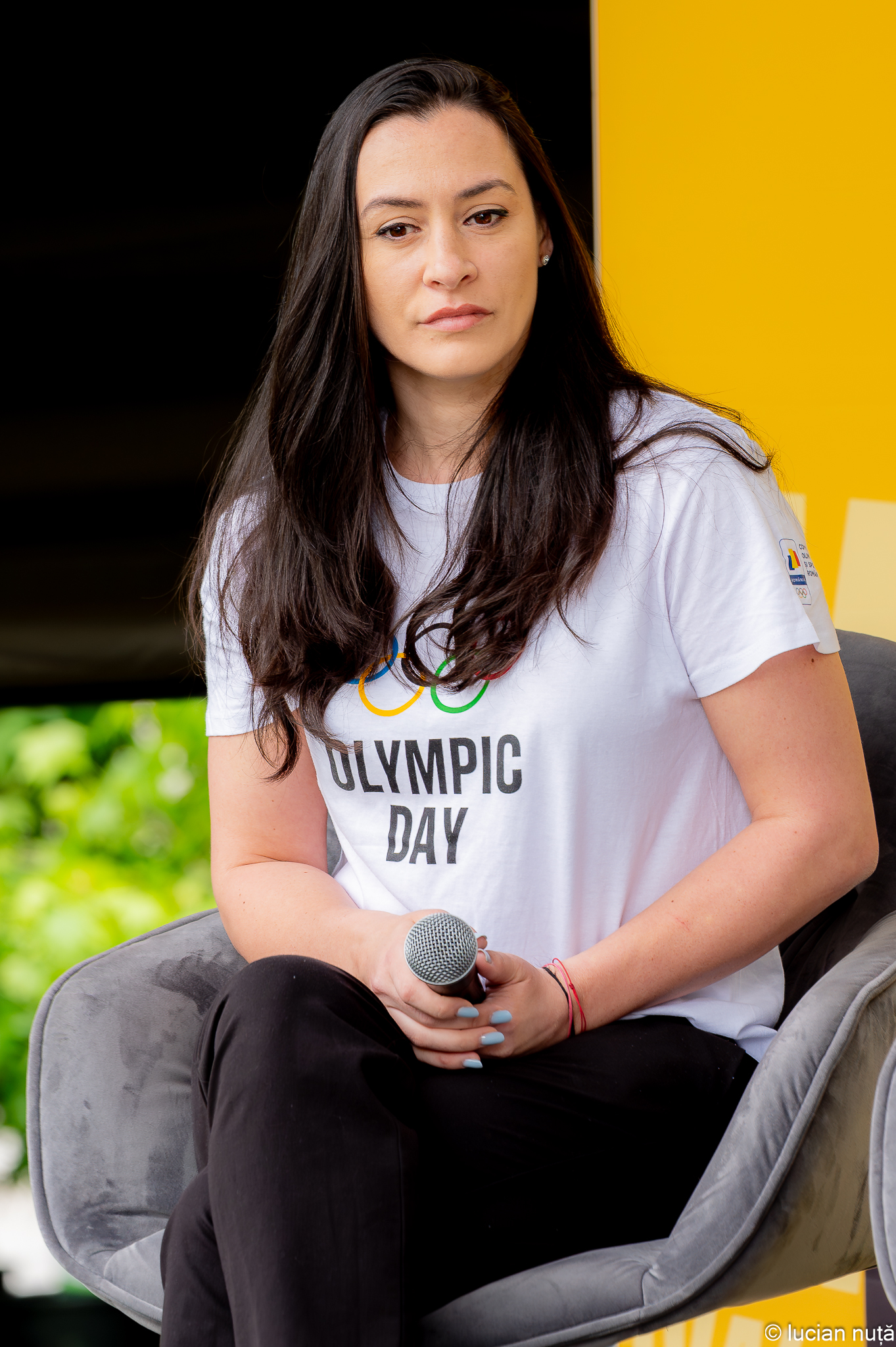
- Ponor in 2026

Personal information
- Full name: Cătălina Ponor
- Nicknames: Cătă, Black Tulip
- Born: 20 August 1987 (age 39) Constanța, Romania
- Height: 1.60 m (5 ft 3 in)

Gymnastics career
- Discipline: Women's artistic gymnastics
- Country represented: Romania; (2002–2007, 2011–2012, 2015–2017)
- Club: CS Dinamo București
- Head coach: Octavian Bellu
- Assistant coach: Sandu Lucian
- Former coaches: Matei Stanei, Gabriela Dosoftei
- Choreographer: Adriana Pop
- Retired: 30 April 2006; 12 December 2007; 8 August 2012; 25 November 2017
Medal record
Event	1st	2nd	3rd
Olympic Games	3	1	1
World Championships	0	3	2
European Championships	8	2	3
World Cup Final	1	1	0
FIG World Cup	7	2	0
Total	19	9	6
Representing Romania
Olympic Games
Gold medal – first place	2004 Athens	Team
Gold medal – first place	2004 Athens	Balance beam
Gold medal – first place	2004 Athens	Floor exercise
Silver medal – second place	2012 London	Floor exercise
Bronze medal – third place	2012 London	Team
World Championships
Silver medal – second place	2003 Anaheim	Team
Silver medal – second place	2003 Anaheim	Balance beam
Silver medal – second place	2003 Anaheim	Floor exercise
Bronze medal – third place	2005 Melbourne	Balance beam
Bronze medal – third place	2007 Stuttgart	Team
World Cup Final
Gold medal – first place	2004 Birmingham	Balance beam
Silver medal – second place	2004 Birmingham	Floor exercise
European Championships
Gold medal – first place	2004 Amsterdam	Team
Gold medal – first place	2004 Amsterdam	Balance beam
Gold medal – first place	2004 Amsterdam	Floor exercise
Gold medal – first place	2005 Debrecen	Balance beam
Gold medal – first place	2006 Volos	Balance beam
Gold medal – first place	2012 Brussels	Team
Gold medal – first place	2012 Brussels	Balance beam
Gold medal – first place	2017 Cluj-Napoca	Balance beam
Silver medal – second place	2006 Volos	Team
Silver medal – second place	2012 Brussels	Floor exercise
Bronze medal – third place	2006 Volos	Floor exercise
Bronze medal – third place	2016 Bern	Balance beam
Bronze medal – third place	2016 Bern	Floor exercise

Cătălina Ponor (Romanian pronunciation: [kətəˈlina poˈnor]; born 20 August 1987) is a Romanian former artistic gymnast who competed at three Summer Olympic Games: 2004, 2012, and 2016. She won three gold medals at the 2004 Summer Olympics in Athens on balance beam, floor and as part of the Romanian team. She also earned a silver medal on floor and bronze medal as part of the Romanian team at the 2012 Summer Olympics in London, as well as multiple World Championship and European Championship medals. She announced her plans to retire from gymnastics after the 2017 Artistic Gymnastics World Championships, in Montreal. During her career, she won 23 Olympic, World and European medals. More than half of them (12) were gold medals. She was inducted into the International Gymnastics Hall of Fame in 2022 but attended the ceremony in 2025 due to travel complications.

== Early life ==
Ponor was born in Constanța and started gymnastics when she was four years old. In 2002, she was discovered training in Constanța by the Romanian national team coaches, Octavian Bellu and Mariana Bitang, who invited her to join the national team.

== Senior gymnastics career ==
=== 2003–2004 ===
Ponor made her international debut at the 2003 World Artistic Gymnastics Championships in Anaheim, California, where the Romanian team finished in second place. Individually, she won silver medals on balance beam, scoring 9.587, and floor, scoring 9.700. In November, she competed at the Artistic Gymnastics World Cup event in Stuttgart, Germany, where she placed first on balance beam (9.587) and third on floor (9.237).

In March 2004, Ponor competed at the World Cup event in Cottbus, Germany. She placed first on balance beam, scoring 9.700, and second on floor, scoring 9.575. Later in March, she competed at the World Cup event in Lyon, France, and won silver medals on balance beam and floor, scoring 9.175 and 9.625 respectively.

At the beginning of May, she helped Romania win the team competition at the European Women's Artistic Gymnastics Championships in Amsterdam. In event finals, she once again placed first on balance beam (9.725) and floor (9.637).

==== Athens Olympics ====
In August, Ponor competed at the 2004 Summer Olympics in Athens. She contributed scores of 9.412 on vault, 9.762 on balance beam, and 9.750 on floor toward the Romanian team's first-place finish. In event finals, she won gold medals on balance beam (9.787) and floor (9.750). She called the results "a dream that came true. ... When I won the gold medal on balance beam, I was very emotional. I had wished to win that medal forever."

Ponor was the first female gymnast since Daniela Silivaș in 1988 to win three gold medals at a single Olympics.

=== 2005–2007 ===
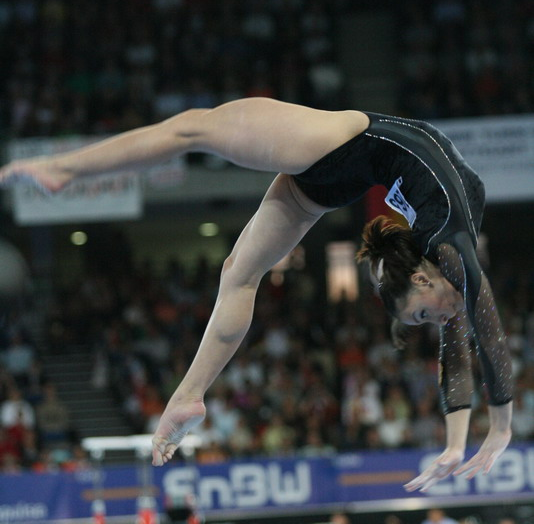
Ponor at the 2007 World Championships

Ponor competed at the European Championships in Debrecen, Hungary, in June 2005. She placed first on balance beam with a score of 9.737 and fourth on floor with a score of 9.200. That fall, she won a bronze medal on beam (9.500) at the 2005 World Championships in Melbourne.

In March 2006, she competed at the Cottbus World Cup and placed sixth in the floor final with a score of 13.250. The following month, at the European Championships in Volos, Greece, she placed first on balance beam (15.800) and third on floor (14.600).

In 2007, Ponor began training with Mariana Bitang again. She said: "She's the only person who can bring me back to the form I was in. She's the only coach who can guide me to a world title and another Olympic title." Bitang added, "We saw her very determined, and we were very surprised to see her appetite for competition."

In July, Ponor competed at the Romanian National Championships in Ploiesti, Romania. She placed first on vault with a score of 15.062 and first on balance beam with a score of 16.500.

In September, Ponor competed at the 2007 World Championships in Stuttgart. She helped the Romanian team place third and individually she placed fourth in the balance beam final with a score of 15.700.

In December, Ponor retired due to ongoing injuries.

=== 2011–2012 ===
Ponor began training again with the Romanian national team in March 2011. She trained under the newly returned coaches Octavian Bellu and Mariana Bitang. At the beginning of August, Ponor had a minor medical procedure to correct a congenital heart defect that was causing an arrhythmia and was able to resume training the same week. She said, "I had a congenital problem I was born with, but I went to the doctor and all is well."

Ponor competed at the 2011 Romanian National Championships. She placed second on balance beam scoring 15.775 and third on floor exercise scoring 14.625. Ponor competed at the 2011 World Championships in Tokyo. She contributed scores of 14.933 on vault, 15.166 on balance beam, and 14.633 on floor exericse towards the Romanian team's fourth-place finish and individually she placed seventh in the balance beam final.

In early 2012 Ponor competed at the 2012 Doha World Challenge Cup. She placed first on balance beam and floor exercise. Ponor said, "I want to do the same thing that I did in 2004. It was hard to make a comeback, but all the time I was thinking that I could do it. I will not relax till I reach my goal." Ponor next competed at an international meet against France followed by another friendly meet against Germany and Great Britain.

In May, Ponor competed at the 2012 European Championships in Brussels. She contributed scores of 15.033 on vault, 15.433 on balance beam, and 14.733 on floor towards the Romanian team's first-place finish. During event finals she placed first on balance beam and second on floor exercise behind compatriot Larisa Iordache. Bellu said, "You saw the reaction of the fans. A triple Olympic champion gets respect, especially if she performs like this." She is the gymnast who has won the most balance beam titles at the European Championships: 2004, 2005, 2006, 2012 and 2017.

Ponor next competed at the Ghent World Cup where she won gold on the balance beam. She competed at an international meet against France, Germany, and Italy in Bucharest, Romania where she helped Romania finish first as a team.

==== London Olympics ====
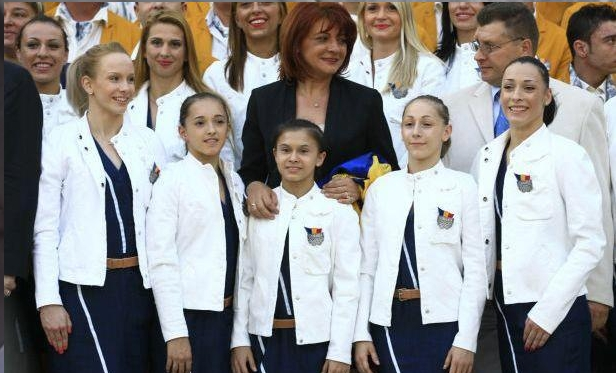
Ponor with the 2012 Romanian Olympic team

At the end of July, Ponor competed at the 2012 Summer Olympics in London. She helped the Romanian team qualify to the team final in fourth place, and individually, she qualified eighth to the balance beam final and seventh to the floor exercise final, despite making an error her third tumbling pass. In the team final, she contributed scores of 15.100 on vault, 15.416 on balance beam, and 14.800 on floor exercise toward Romania's third-place finish. She earned the highest score on balance beam during the team competition.

During the balance beam event final Ponor placed fourth. She originally was in the third place position, but after American Aly Raisman had an inquiry accepted about her difficulty score, they finished in a tie. However, after the tie-breaking procedure which prioritized execution score, Raisman was awarded the bronze medal. Ponor said, "I will say it again, and I want everyone to know, I will quit without regrets. I have worked every second for my team, I have worked every second for myself, I have worked every second for everybody. I have already been an Olympic champion. I will quit gymnastics with my chin up."

During the floor exercise final Ponor won the silver medal behind Raiman.

=== 2015–2017 ===
In February 2015, Ponor registered for the anti-doping control within the International Federation of Gymnastics, which suggested that she might be returning to competition. She officially announced her comeback in early March. She told WOGymnastika that by coming back for a third time, she will be risking her biggest failure. She could not compete in the 2015 European Games in Baku as she was not eligible yet. In September, Ponor made her return in competition by competing in a friendly meet between Romania and France where she helped the Romanian team place first.

Ponor competed at the 2016 Doha World Challenge Cup where she won gold on the balance beam. In April, she competed at the Olympic Test Event where Romania failed to qualify a full team to the upcoming Olympic Games. In June, Ponor competed at the 2016 European Championships where she won two bronze medals – on balance beam and floor exercise.

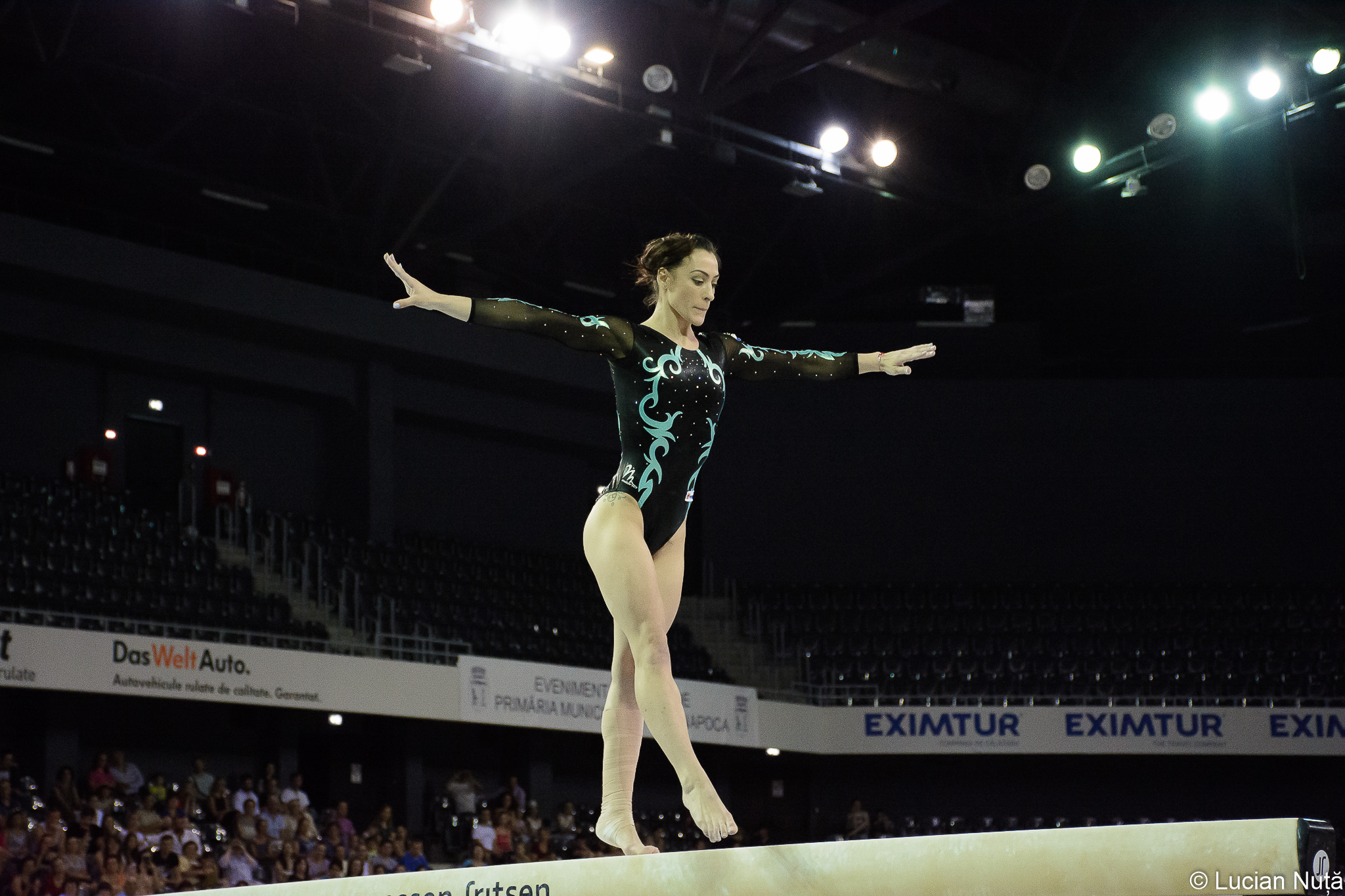
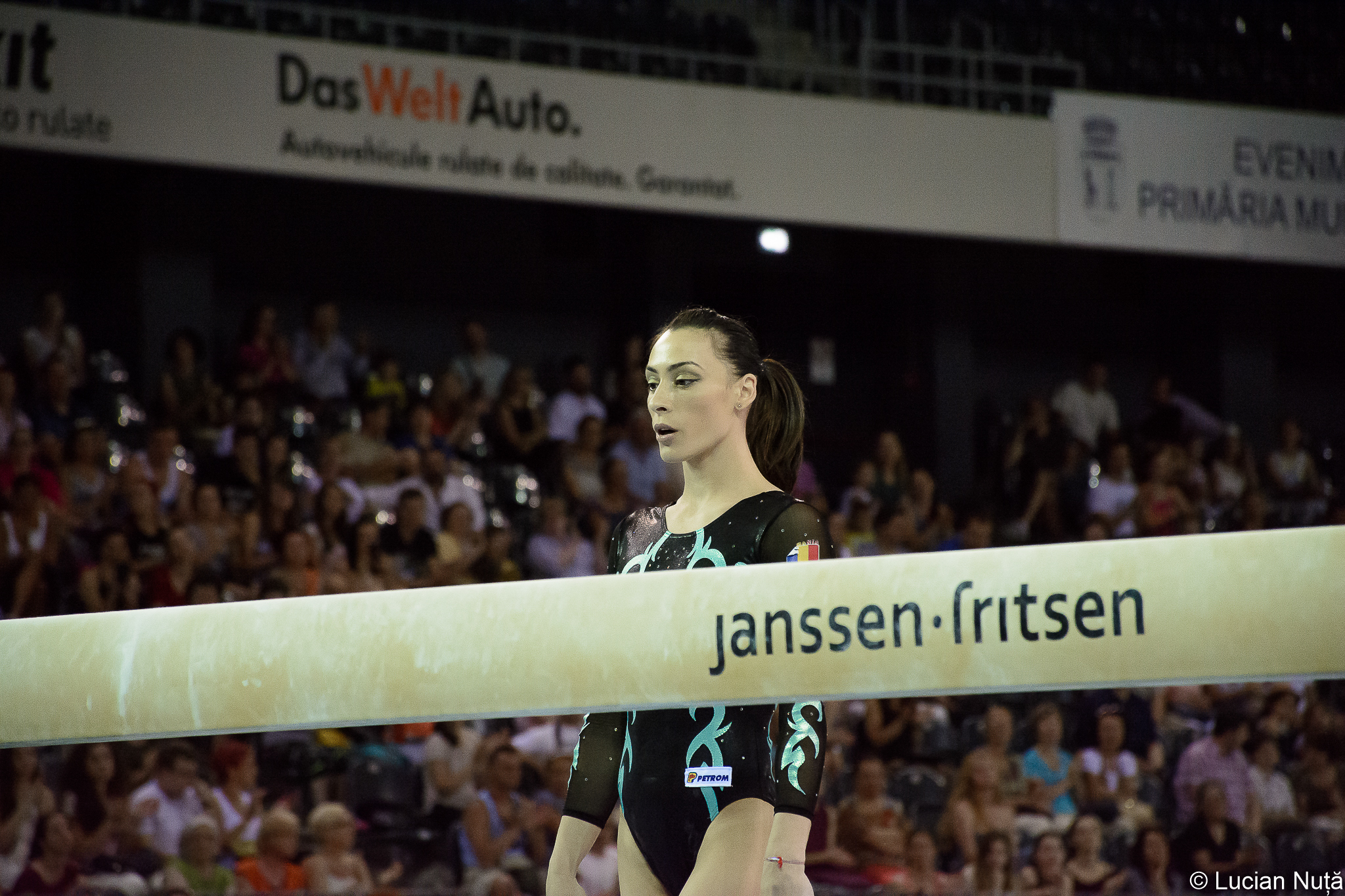
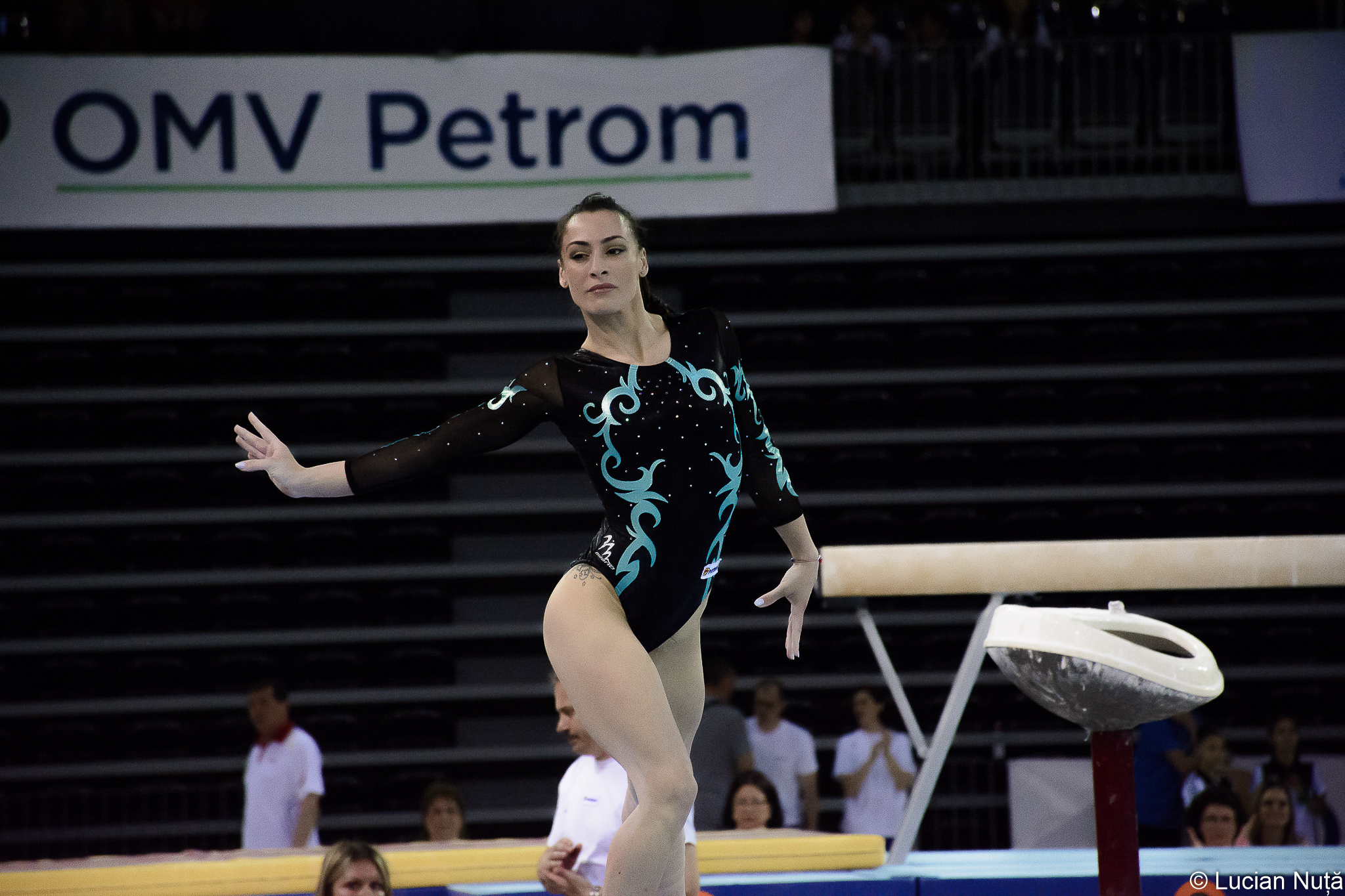
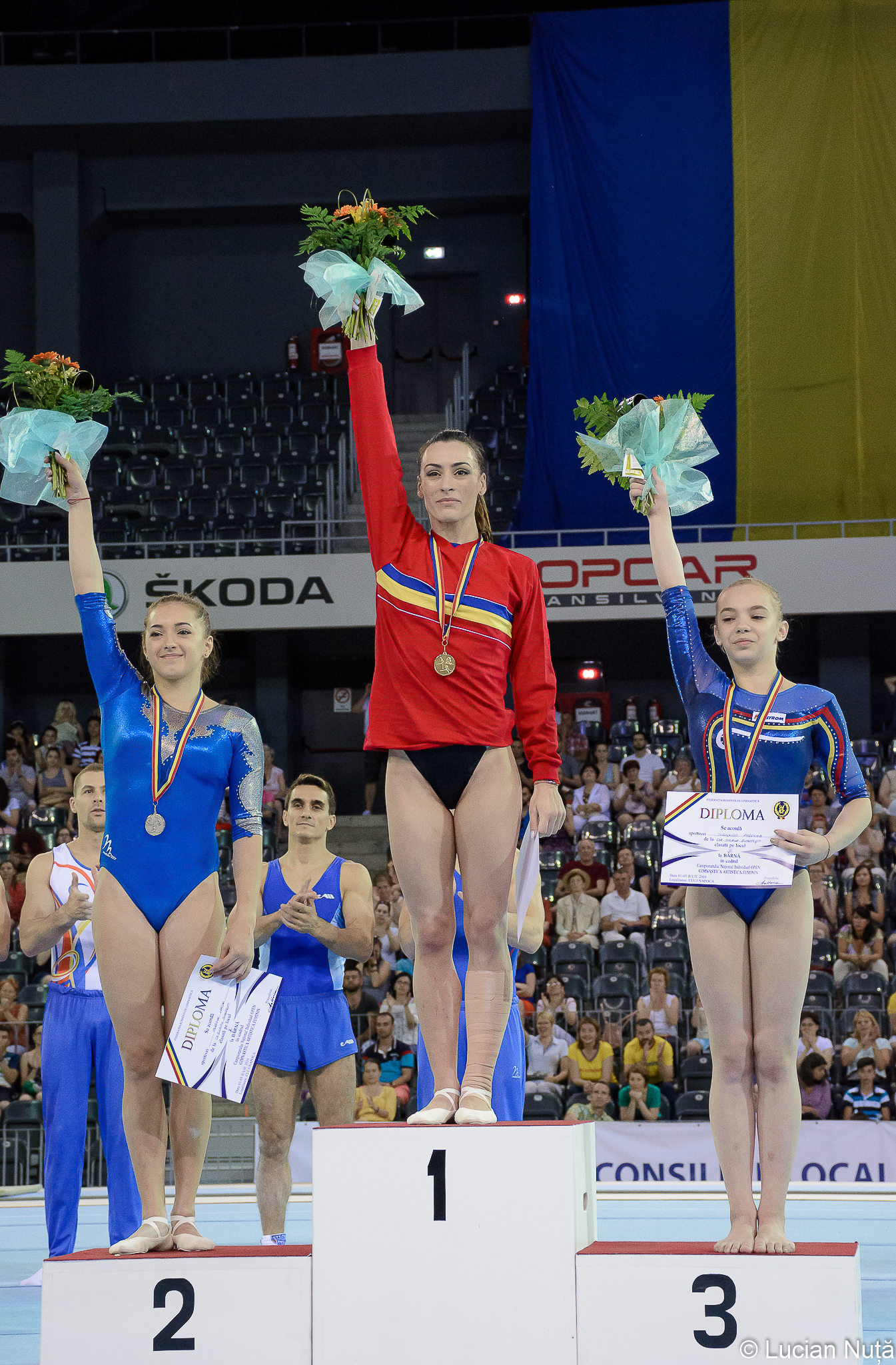
Ponor at the 2016 Romanian National Championships

Romania earned a single Olympic berth for the 2016 Olympic Games; the Romanian Gymnastics Federation announced the spot would either go to Ponor or Larisa Iordache. Despite Iordache winning the all-around at the Romanian National Championships, the berth was given to Ponor who won the national titles on balance beam and floor exercise. This announcement was made shortly after Ponor was named as Romania's flag bearer for the opening ceremonies, the first time this honor was given to a gymnast.

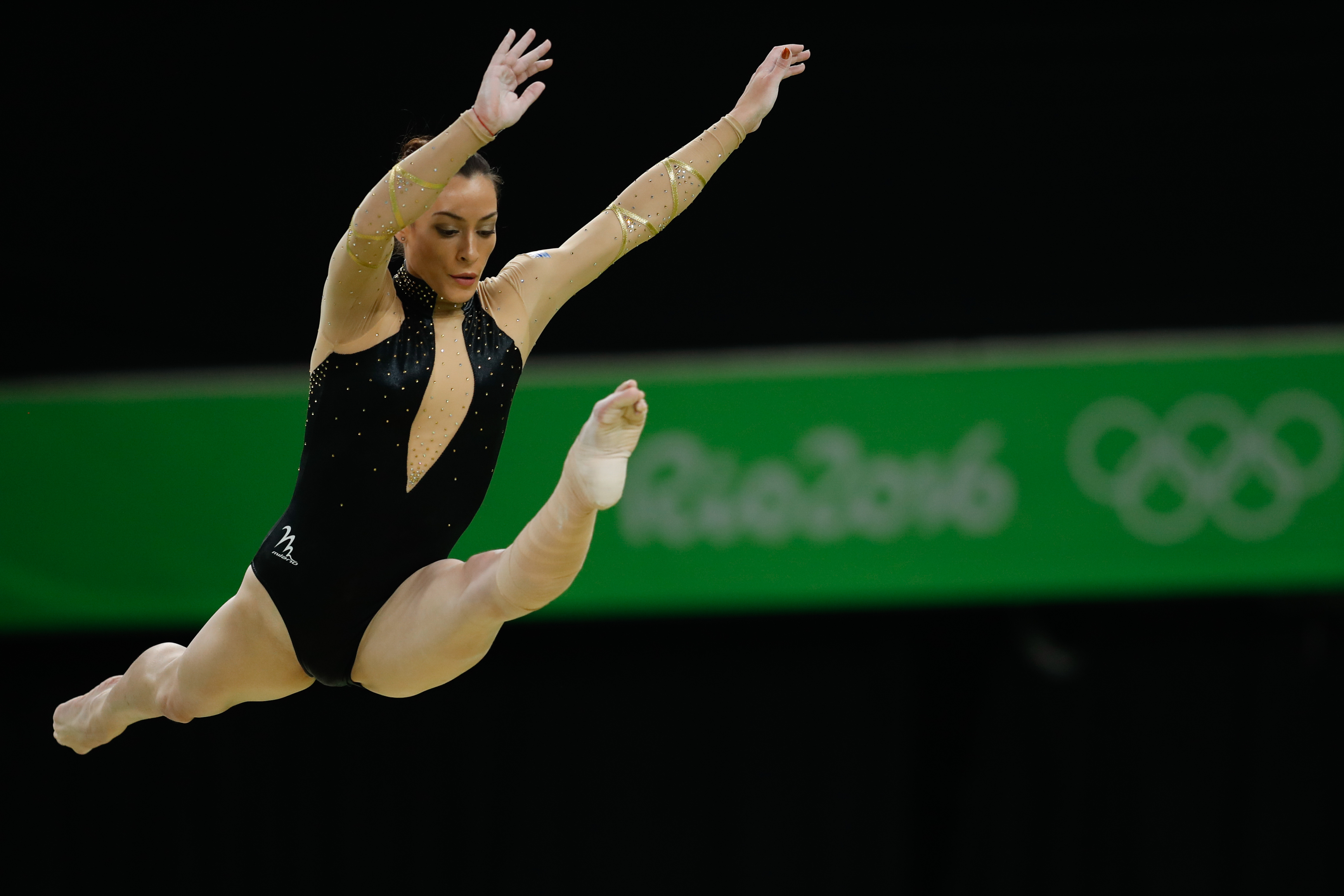
Ponor at the 2016 Olympic Games

During the qualification round at the Olympics Ponor placed fifth on the balance beam and fourteenth on floor exercise, qualifying to the event final on the former. During the balance beam final she placed seventh.

Ponor continued to compete in 2017. She began the year by winning titles on the balance beam and floor exercise at the 2017 Baku World Cup. One week later she won a silver medal on balance beam at the Doha World Cup. At the 2017 European Championships in Cluj-Napoca, Romania, Ponor competed on balance beam and floor exericse. She missed the floor exercise final because her routine lacked a front tumbling connection requirement. However, she qualified to the balance beam final where she won the gold medal emotionally in front of a noisy and appreciative home crowd.

In October, Ponor competed at the 2017 World Championships in Montreal. During the qualification round she finished twenty-sixth on balance beam and fourteenth on floor exercise, qualifying to neither event final. She ended the year competing at the 2017 Mexico Open where she won a silver medal in the 3-event all-around. Afterwards, Ponor announced her official retirement from competitive gymnastics for the third time.

== Post-retirement career ==
At the 2017 World Championships in Montreal, she was elected as the women's artistic gymnastics (WAG) athlete representative for the FIG's athlete commission for the 2018-2025 term. She was elected alongside Aljaz Pegan, who was re-elected for a second term. She is succeeded by Filipa Martins.

== Personal life ==
Ponor was in a relationship with Puerto Rican gymnast Tommy Ramos from 2012 until 2016. As of 18 June 2022, she is married to Romanian actor and director Bogdan Jianu. On her 35th birthday, Ponor revealed on Instagram, that she and Jianu were expecting their first child together. On 29 December 2022, Ponor gave birth to a baby boy. She announced the Romanian jury points in the final of Eurovision Song Contest 2021.

== Competitive history ==
Competitive history of Cătălina Ponor
Year	Event	Team	AA	VT	UB	BB	FX
2003
2003	World Championships	2nd place, silver medalist(s)				2nd place, silver medalist(s)	2nd place, silver medalist(s)
2004
2004	European Championships	1st place, gold medalist(s)				1st place, gold medalist(s)	1st place, gold medalist(s)
2004	Olympic Games	1st place, gold medalist(s)				1st place, gold medalist(s)	1st place, gold medalist(s)
2005
2005	European Championships					1st place, gold medalist(s)	4
2005	World Championships					3rd place, bronze medalist(s)	
2006
2006	European Championships	2nd place, silver medalist(s)				1st place, gold medalist(s)	3rd place, bronze medalist(s)
2007
2007	World Championships	3rd place, bronze medalist(s)				4	
2007	National Championships			1st place, gold medalist(s)		1st place, gold medalist(s)	
2011
2011	World Championships	4				7	
2011	National Championships					2nd place, silver medalist(s)	3rd place, bronze medalist(s)
2012	Doha World Cup					1st place, gold medalist(s)	1st place, gold medalist(s)
2012	FRA-ROU Friendly	1st place, gold medalist(s)					
2012	GER-GBR-ROU Friendly	1st place, gold medalist(s)					
2012	European Championships	1st place, gold medalist(s)				1st place, gold medalist(s)	2nd place, silver medalist(s)
2012	Ghent World Cup					1st place, gold medalist(s)	
2012	ROU-FRA-GER-ITA Friendly	1st place, gold medalist(s)					
2012	Olympic Games	3rd place, bronze medalist(s)				4	2nd place, silver medalist(s)
2015	FRA-ROU Friendly	1st place, gold medalist(s)					
2016	Doha World Cup					1st place, gold medalist(s)	
2016	BEL-ROU-GER Friendly	2nd place, silver medalist(s)					
2016	European Championships	6				3rd place, bronze medalist(s)	3rd place, bronze medalist(s)
2016	National Championships	1st place, gold medalist(s)				1st place, gold medalist(s)	1st place, gold medalist(s)
2016	Chemnitz Friendly	3rd place, bronze medalist(s)					
2016	Olympic Games					7	
2016	Mexican Open					1st place, gold medalist(s)	1st place, gold medalist(s)
2017	Baku World Cup					1st place, gold medalist(s)	1st place, gold medalist(s)
2017	Doha World Cup					2nd place, silver medalist(s)	
2017	European Championships					1st place, gold medalist(s)	
2017	National Championships	3rd place, bronze medalist(s)				2nd place, silver medalist(s)	2nd place, silver medalist(s)
2017	Szombathely World Cup					1st place, gold medalist(s)	2nd place, silver medalist(s)
2017	Arthur Gander Memorial		4	7		2nd place, silver medalist(s)	4
2017	Mexican Open		2nd place, silver medalist(s)	3rd place, bronze medalist(s)		1st place, gold medalist(s)	1st place, gold medalist(s)

== Floor music ==
Year	Music Title
2004	Gia
2005	Harem
2006	Underground
2007	Dark Angel
2011	Rise
2011–2012	Requiem for a Dream
2012	Fever
2016	Powerful

== See also ==
- List of Olympic female gymnasts for Romania
- List of Olympic medal leaders in women's gymnastics

Olympic Games
Preceded by Horia Tecău	Flagbearer for Romania; Rio de Janeiro 2016	Succeeded by Robert Glință; Simona Radiș
