= Ilie Daniel Popescu =

Romanian artistic gymnast

Daniel Popescu
- Full name: Ilie Daniel Popescu
- Born: 1 June 1983 (age 43) Reşiţa, Romania

Gymnastics career
- Discipline: Men's artistic gymnastics
- Country represented: Romania
- Head coach: Danuţ Grecu
- Assistant coach: Stefan Gal
Medal record
Summer Olympics
Bronze medal – third place	Athens 2004	Team
World Championships
Silver medal – second place	Stuttgart 2007	Vault
European Championships
Silver medal – second place	Volos 2006	Team
Bronze medal – third place	Lausanne 2008	Team
Bronze medal – third place	Lausanne 2008	Vault

Ilie Daniel Popescu (born 1 June 1983 in Reşiţa) is a Romanian-born former artistic gymnast. He is an Olympic Team bronze medallist (2004), a world silver medalist (2007/ vault) and a European bronze medalist (2008/ Pommel Horse). He changed his nationality to German. He coaches several teams of the German gymnastics club TV Schwäbisch Gmünd Wetzgau, for which he also starts in the German Gymnastics League.
