= Jules Michel =

French painter

Jules Michel (born 10 April 1931) is a French artist.

== Biography ==
As a child of eight, while exploring the family attic, Jules Michel discovered an old oil-paint box. With it, he quickly improvised his first paintings.

At fourteen, he became the top champion speed roller skater in Paris. He showed interest in the craftsmanship of his uncle, engraver Raymond Courcaut. This dual influence lead Michel to study advertising, while he also took up competitive cycling and continued to paint in private. Though he received guidance from Georges Rouault and Pablo Picasso, he ultimately forged a distinctive style of his own.

It was just after World War II, during the Saint-Germain-des-Prés period, that Michel met thinkers as Jean-Paul Sartre, Simone de Beauvoir and Boris Vian against a backdrop of music by the still unknown Juliette Gréco, and Sidney Bechet and Claude Luter on their way to fame as jazzmen.

Embracing a career in advertising, Michel moved up the agency ladder quickly and steadily, but never forgot his first love. In 1945 he learnt photogravure, lithography, silkscreen printing and engraving

Michel continued painting and sculpting but was too individualistic and too full of energy to follow a long academic course. Instead, he roamed the Louvre, learned from his artist friends and periodically attended a variety of art schools including, from 1948 to 1951, Ecole des Arts Appliqués et des Arts Décoratifs, Les Beaux Arts and La Grande Chaumière, where he was temporarily interested in Cubism. In 1951 he performed his military service.

In 1973 he established his first studio in Paris. Between 1974 and 1980 he lived in Australia, then moved to Montreal, Quebec, Canada.

== Collections ==
Art collectors who have works by Jules Michel include

- Queen Elizabeth II of the United Kingdom
- Mercedes-Benz, Sydney
- Banque Nationale de Paris, Sydney, Australia
- Art Museum, Adelaide, Australia
- Musée Laurier, Victoriaville, Canada
- Government of Taiwan, Taipei, Taiwan
- Robert L. Grant, Sydney, Australia

== Exhibitions and awards ==
- First One Man Show, Galerie Raymond Duncan, Paris 1952–1971
- Group Exhibition, Salon des Artistes Indépendants and Salon d'Automne, Paris 1956
- Winner of the Advertising Trophy for the campaign of the year for "Woolmark" 1968
- Retrospective exhibition, Paris 1971
- Some 30 one man shows across Australia 1979
- Exhibition at Galerie Michele Boussard, Paris 1980
- "Hommage to Jacques Brel", Galerie Le Méridien, Montreal 1981
- Jubilee and Retrospective, Liebert Art Gallery, Sydney 1982
- "Paix Madame", Galerie Hélène Boullé, Montreal 1984
- "Forum", Galerie de L'Isle, Montreal 1986
- Salon International des Arts, Montreal 1987
- "Retrospective exhibition" Musée Laurier, Arthabaska, Canada 1987
- Exhibition at Patricia Judith Art Gallery, Boca Raton, Florida, United States 1988
- Salon d'Automne, Montreal 1989
- Exhibition at Patricia Judith Art Gallery, Boca Raton, Florida 1990
- "Hommage to Van Gogh", Galerie Sherbrooke, Montreal 1991
- Tokyo International Art Salon (TIAS), Japan 1992
- Consortium des Arts, Hôtel Byblos, Saint-Tropez, France 1992
- Wentworth Art Gallery, Miami, Florida 1993
- Wentworth Art Gallery, Boca Raton, and Palm Beach, Florida 1994
- Musée du Mas Carbasse, Saint-Estève, Pyrénées Orientales, France 1996
- Château Valmy, Argelès-sur-Mer, Pyrénées Orientales 1997
- Salon des Arts, Sofitel, La Défense, Paris 1998
- L'Olivier, Saint-Estève, Pyrénées Orientales
- Galerie Maurice-Gabriel François, Levallois-Perret, Groupe CIC, Levallois-Perret, France 1999
- Ariotel, Perpignan, Pyrénées Orientales 1998–2000
- Le Voilier des Saveurs, Perpignan, Pyrénées Orientales 1998–2000
- Research and preparation for the exhibition "Mille ans d'en France" 206 art pieces 2000
- "Mille ans d'en France" Saint-Mamet, Saint-Estève, Pyrénées Orientales
- Congress of Mayors of Pyrénées Orientales, Prades, Pyrénées Orientales
- Congress of Mayors of France, Paris 2002
- Galerie Castelginest, Aude, France 2003
- Académie Artistique du Pays Catalan, Baixas, Pyrénées Orientales 2003
- Tribute to Charlie Chaplin's, "The Kid", in the presence of Michael Chaplin, Palais des Congrès, Perpignan, Pyrénées Orientales 2003
- Galerie Martin Vivès, Chateau Les Pins, Baixas, Pyrénées Orientales 2005
- CCAS, Narbonne, Aude 2005
- Galerie Phare Sud, Gruissan, Aude 2005
- Espace Gibert, Lézignan-Corbières, Aude 2005
- Société Générale, Palais de la Scala, Monte Carlo, Monaco 2006
- Une promenade en Espagne, Centro Español Perpignan 2006
- Centro Español, Perpignan 2007
- Galerie Eric Chesnais, Alençon, France 2007
- Phare Sud, Gruissan 2007
