= Marine Debauve =

French artistic gymnast

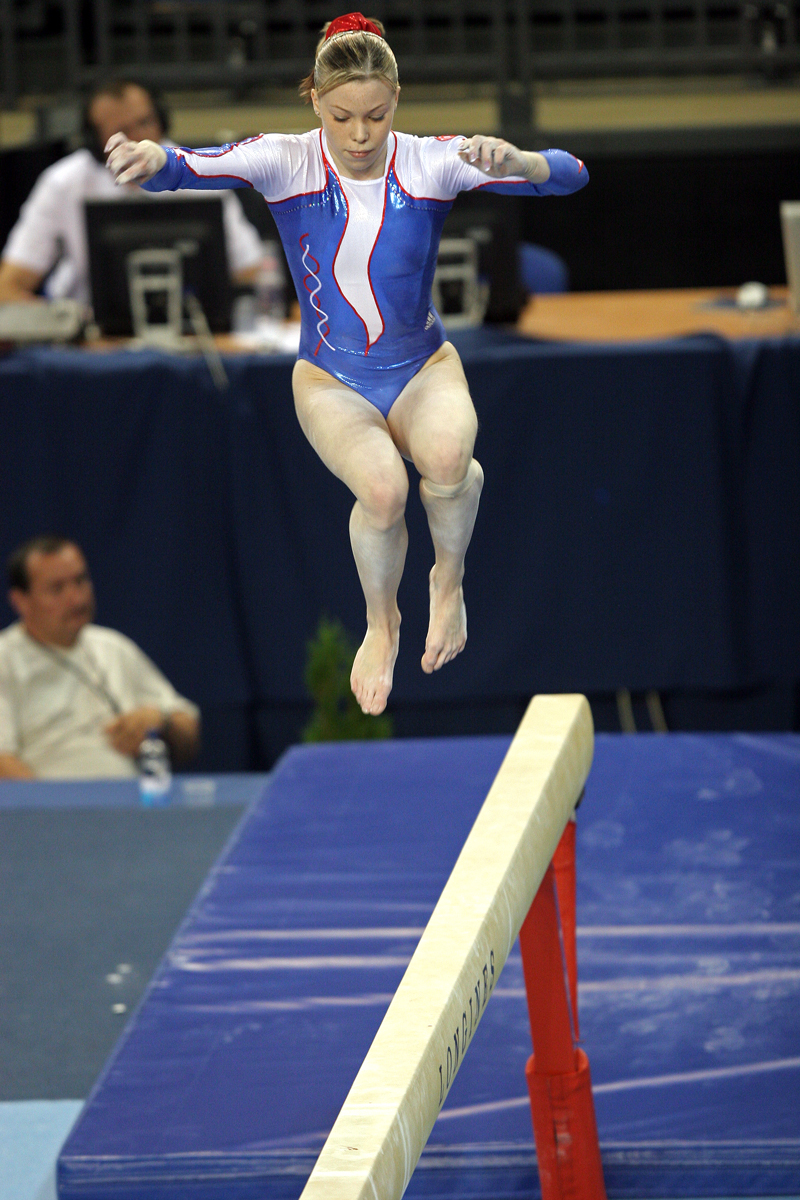
- Debauve at the 2005 European Championships

Personal information
- Full name: Marine Debauve
- Born: 3 September 1988 (age 38) Dijon, France

Gymnastics career
- Discipline: Women's artistic gymnastics
- Country represented: France
- Head coach: Yves Kieffe
- Assistant coaches: Veronique Legras, Marjorie Heuls
- Choreographer: Karine Martelli
Medal record
Representing France
Women's artistic gymnastics
European Championships
Gold medal – first place	2005 Debrecen	All-around
Silver medal – second place	2005 Debrecen	Balance beam
Mediterranean Games
Silver medal – second place	2005 Almería	Team
Silver medal – second place	2005 Almería	Balance beam
Bronze medal – third place	2005 Almería	Floor exercise
Women's tumbling
World Championships
Bronze medal – third place	2010 Metz	Tumbling

Marine Debauve (born 3 September 1988) is a French artistic gymnast who competed in the 2004 and 2008 Summer Olympics. As the 2005 all-around European Champion, Debauve is also the first French female gymnast to win a major international all-around title. She was also the 2003 and 2005 French all-around national champion.

== Gymnastics career ==
Debauve first became interested in gymnastics at the age of 4 and participated in her first international competition at the age of 11. In 2003, she won the all-around French championship and took part in her first world championships. She represented her country at the 2004 Summer Olympics in Athens, Greece, finishing 6th in the team event. In the all-around final, she finished in seventh place, the highest ranking ever achieved by a French gymnast at the Olympics.

A year later, she was all-around champion at the 2005 European Championships, becoming the first Frenchwoman to win a major international all-around title. She also won the silver medal on beam at the same European Championships.

Although she initially retired in 2005 after winning the European Championships, Debauve returned to compete for France at the 2008 Summer Olympics. In the team final, the French team finished in seventh place. Debauve currently lives in Dijon and was coached by Yves Kieffer and Marjorie Heuls. After her gymnastic career, she decided to start a new sport, Tumbling. She did it for a year and half, and finished with a bronze medal at the World Championship in Metz, France.

=== World Cup Series ===
Stage	Year	Event	Result
Paris	2005	Balance Beam	1st place, gold medalist(s)
Lyon	2004	Uneven Bars	2nd place, silver medalist(s)
