= Sergey Khorokhordin =

Russian artistic gymnast (born 1985)

- Full name: Sergey Gennadiyevich Khorokhordin
- Born: 9 October 1985 (age 40) Barnaul, Russia

Gymnastics career
- Discipline: Men's artistic gymnastics
- Country represented: Russia
Medal record
Men's artistic gymnastics
Representing Russia
World Championships
Silver medal – second place	2006 Aarhus	Team
European Championships
Gold medal – first place	2006 Volos	Team
Gold medal – first place	2008 Lausanne	Team

Sergei Gennadiyevich Khorokhordin (Russian: Сергей Геннадьевич Хорохордин, IPA: [sʲɪrˈɡʲej ɡʲɪˈnadʲjɪvʲɪtɕ xərɐˈxordʲɪn]; born 9 October 1985 in Barnaul) is a Russian gymnast. He helped Russia to win gold in the team event at the European Artistic Gymnastics Championships in Lucerne, Switzerland. He is best known for his high-bar and ring routines but says that parallel bars and high bar are his best events. At the 2012 Russian Artistic Gymnastics Championships, he won silver on the parallel bars and horizontal bar.

== See also ==
- List of Olympic male artistic gymnasts for Russia
