= Melanie Marti =

Swiss artistic gymnast

- Born: 3 June 1986 (age 40) Glarus
- Height: 161 cm (5 ft 3 in)

Gymnastics career
- Discipline: Women's artistic gymnastics
- Country represented: Switzerland
- Club: Kutu Glarnerland
- Head coach: Eric Demay
- Assistant coach: Cécile Demay
- Choreographer: Pascale Grossenbacher

Melanie Marti (born 3 June 1986) is a Swiss former artistic gymnast. She competed at the 2004 Summer Olympics.
