= Filip Yanev =

Bulgarian gymnast (born 1982)

- Филип Янев
- Born: 10 March 1982 (age 44) Sofia, Bulgaria

Gymnastics career
- Discipline: Men's artistic gymnastics
- Country represented: Bulgaria

Filip Yanev (Bulgarian: Филип Янев) (born 10 March 1982) is a Bulgarian gymnast. He competed at the 2004 Summer Olympics where he placed fifth in the vault final.
