= Sport in Ukraine =

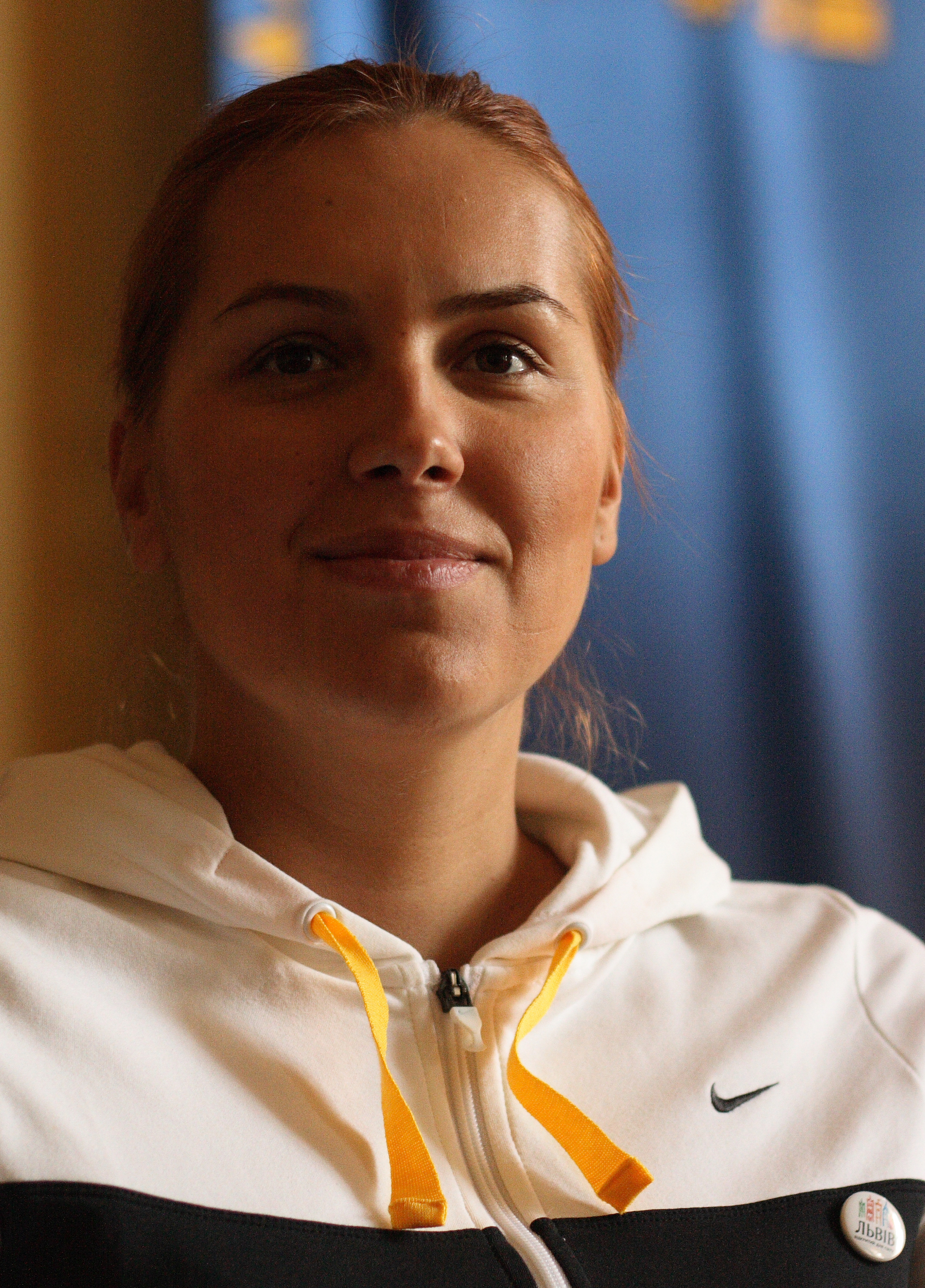
Swimmer Yana Klochkova holds a record of 4 Olympic gold medals

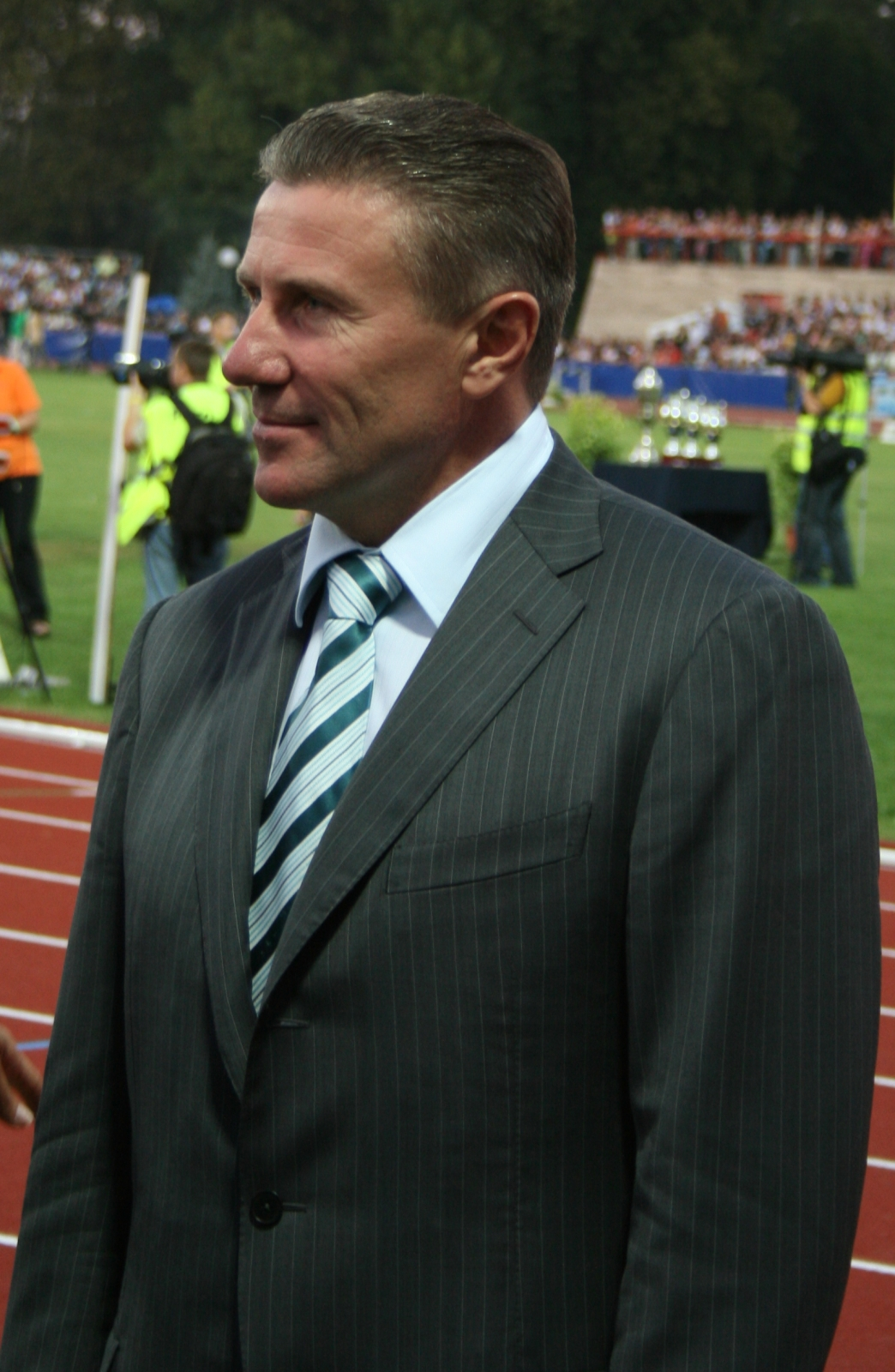
President of NOC Ukraine, Serhiy Bubka, a legendary Soviet and Ukrainian pole vault jumper

Sports in Ukraine as in any other country throughout the world plays an important role in shaping the popular view of Ukraine and Ukrainian popular culture to its residents and the rest of the world. Sports in Ukraine while it is voluntary and spontaneous, it is regulated and standardized by the government and respected government agency as well as legislation. According to the Law of Ukraine "About physical culture and sports", sports is an activity of subjects of the sphere of physical culture and sport directed to identification and the unified comparison of achievements of people in physical, intellectual, and other preparation by holding sports competitions and preparation for them. The sport has such directions: children's sports, sports for children and young people, reserve sports, elite sports (sports of higher achievements), professional sports, sports of veterans of physical culture and sport, veterans of war, the Olympic sport, not Olympic sport, office and applied and military and applied sport, sports of persons with disability and so forth.

Being dominated by Russia since the 18th century, sports in the bigger portion of Ukraine as the rest of popular culture in Ukraine has been overshadowed by Russian culture as its regional deviation. As part of Ukrainian culture, sports began its development in Austria-Hungary and were influenced by various European physical culture movements such as pan-Germanic Turners, pan-Slavic Sokol movement, and others (such as all-Jewish Maccabiah sports). In the Russian Empire, the Ukrainian nation was never recognized and was criminally prosecuted, while the Little-Russian culture was allowed to exist only as folk culture. Only after dissolution of the Soviet Union, in 1992 the Ukrainian anthem first sounded at Olympic Games starting with the Olympic victory of Oleh Kucherenko and immediately followed by victories of Tetiana Hutsu and Oleksandra Tymoshenko.

Football and wrestling have been popular in Ukraine since the 19th century. Ukraine has benefited from the Soviet Union's emphasis on physical education, and Ukraine was left with hundreds of stadiums, swimming pools, gymnasiums, and other athletic facilities after the collapse of the Soviet Union. Ukraine sports or athletic movements were influenced greatly by the Sokol gymnast organization that was popular in the Central Europe since the second half of the 19th century.

Sport in Ukraine is primarily governed by 40 federations of various Olympic sports that are all part of the National Olympic Committee of Ukraine (NOC Ukraine), which in its turn is part of the International Olympic Committee (IOC). The mass sports movement is driven by four main sports societies (i.e. Dynamo – Ukraine) and two government sports committees of the Ministry of Education and the Armed Forces of Ukraine (CSC AF Ukraine), all of which are also collective members of the National Olympic Committee.

All non-Olympic sports are governed by their respective federations of the Sports Committee of Ukraine.

Ukraine also has a strong paralympic team.

== Football ==
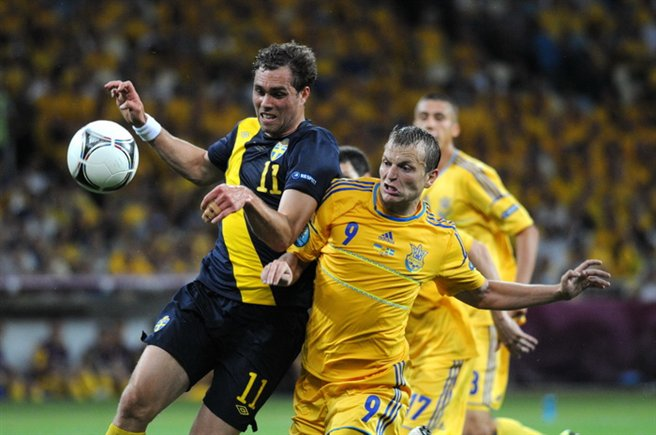
Match of Ukraine national football team in UEFA Euro 2012.

Football is the most popular sport in Ukraine. Football in Ukraine is governed by the Football Federation of Ukraine (FFU). FFU organizes various football competitions in the country among men, women, youth, handicapped, others as well as facilitates football competitions among professionals, students and in regions. Format of competitions varies from leagues (round robin) to cup-type (elimination) competitions. FFU also organizes several invitational tournaments (friendlies) in Ukraine and organizes several national teams that compete at various international tournaments.

Ukraine has a well developed professional football competitions among men that Ukraine inherited from the Soviet Union. Organization of professional football is delegated by FFU to the Ukrainian Premier League (UPL) and the Professional Football League of Ukraine (PFL, competitions in lower leagues). The strongest and highest-tier league is Premier League, which was also known as Vyshcha Liha (Top League, Higher League). The second-ranking league is Persha Liha (First League). The next league down is Druha Liha (Second League), which is divided into two groups, East(B) and West(A), according to their location. At the end of each season, the two lowest-ranking teams in the Vyscha Liha are relegated to the Persha Liha, while the two top teams of the Persha Liha are promoted to the Vyscha Liha. The two lowest-ranking Persha Liha teams are relegated to the Druha Liha, while the top two teams in the Druha Liha League are promoted to the Persha Liha. Teams receive three points if they win, one point for a draw, and no points for a loss. Each team plays each other twice.

Ukraine has also amateur level national football competitions which are governed by the Ukrainian Football Amateur Association.

Teams from all professional leagues participate in the Ukrainian Cup. The winners of the Ukrainian Championship and the Ukrainian Cup will participate in the Ukrainian Super Cup.

Andriy Shevchenko is the most recognizable among Ukrainian footballers, who is considered a national hero in Ukraine.

Ukraine was the host to the UEFA European Football Championship in 2012, together with Poland.

Following the annexation of Crimea by Russia in March 2014, all Crimean based football clubs were dissolved by the Russian occupation administration and most were reorganized as the Russian clubs. Some former Crimean clubs that competed in the Ukrainian competitions relocated to the continental Ukraine where they were reorganized anew.

== Basketball ==
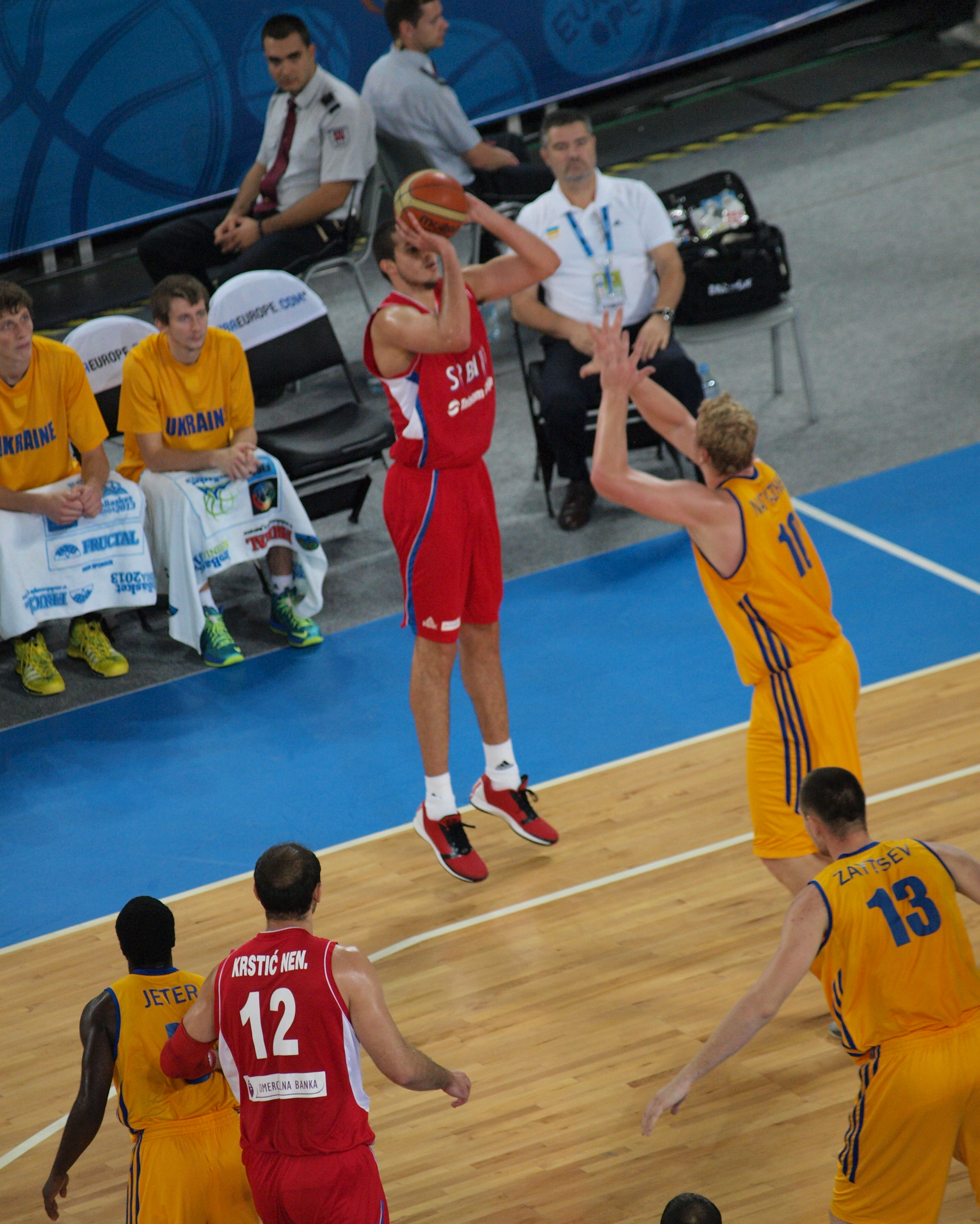
Serbian team attacking Ukraine, Eurobasket 2013

Besides football, a major sport in Ukraine is basketball. Ukrainian basketball players were among the decisive factors for the success of the USSR national basketball team, which dominated Europe for decades and at times dominated the global basketball scene as well. These players included most notably Alexander Belostenny, Anatoli Polivoda, Vladimir Tkachenko and Alexander Anatolyevich Volkov and others. Since the dissolution of the Soviet Union, especially the Ukrainian club teams BC Kyiv and BC Azovmash gained international attention as they both reached the FIBA EuroCup finals in 2005 and 2007 respectively. The Ukraine national basketball team slowly but surely has made a name among elite competition in Europe. Its hopes are up for the 2015 European Basketball Championship on home soil.

When in 2012, the country gained official confirmation to host the 2015 European Championship, basketball received major public boost in Ukraine. Host cities were to be Dnipropetrovsk, Donetsk, Ivano-Frankivsk, Kyiv, Lviv, Odesa and Kharkiv. Several arenas were to be renovated for the occasion. This major international sporting event had the slogan: "We are ready!" and points to the experience of the country, which was received in preparation for the European Football Championship 2012. As Oleksandr Volkov, president of the Ukrainian Basketball Federation pointed out that the country's experience in hosting an event of such magnitude came through the mentioned football championships. This displays the readiness of Ukrainian infrastructure and had become a decisive factor for the selection of Ukraine.

On 9 February 2012 the President of Ukraine, Viktor Yanukovych issued a decree that instructed the government to create a "Organizing Committee on preparation and holding in Ukraine Euro 2015 basketball Championship" (committee is headed by Prime Minister Mykola Azarov).

Many facilities necessary for the EuroBasket 2015 (roads, airports, hotels, etc.) have been built in preparation for the European Football Championship in 2012, which significantly reduced the expected cost of the basketball event. Unfortunately, due to the Ukrainian Revolution of 2013-2014, the FIBA Eurobasket event would end up being cancelled for Ukraine and instead would involve four different countries taking part for the first time ever. However, because of their situation, the committee has obligated Ukraine to placing a bid for EuroBasket 2017 instead.

Ukraine hosted 2013 FIBA Europe Under-16 Championship.

In general, the teams of the Ukrainian basketball league are strong enough to make it into the Eurocup basketball championship. The top Ukrainian League is called the Ukrainian Basketball Super League. The next top league is called the Vyscha Liha. The next strongest league is called the Persha Liha.

== Boxing ==
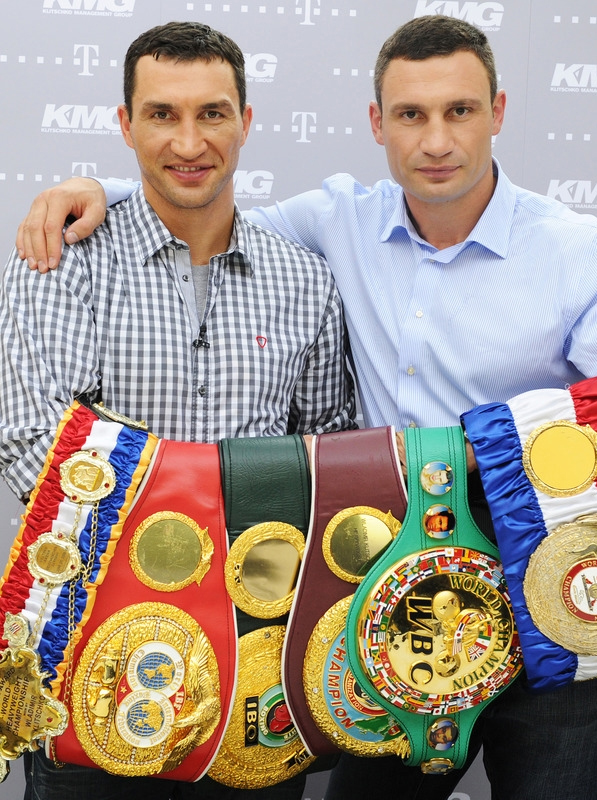
Vitali and his brother, Wladimir, held every major championship belt before his retirement.

Ukraine is noted for producing some of the most skilled boxers in recent times, including brothers Wladimir and Vitali Klitchsko, who, now retired, won multiple world titles throughout their career. The brothers dominated the heavyweight division in a period now affectionately referred to as the "Klitschko Era".

Also hailing from Ukraine, Vasyl Lomachenko, the 2008 and 2012 Olympic gold medalist who is widely regarded as one of the greatest amateur boxers of all time after compiling a record of 396–1. He currently ties the record for becoming a world champion in the fewest professional fights, winning the WBO featherweight title in his third fight.

Another renowned Ukrainian is Lomachenko's friend and former amateur teammate, Oleksandr Usyk. Himself a 2012 Olympic gold medalist, he became the first boxer in history to hold all four of the major world titles in the cruiserweight division—WBA (Super), WBC, IBF, and WBO—simultaneously. On the 25th of September 2021, he beat Anthony Joshua by unanimous decision to win the WBA (Super), IBF, WBO, and IBO heavyweight titles. In May 2024, Oleksandr Usyk then defeated Tyson Fury to become the Undisputed World Heavyweight Boxing champion.

== Ice hockey ==
Ukraine has an ice hockey league, the Professional Hockey League. Their most notable and historic team is Sokil Kyiv, where the highest level team in the country is HC Donbass, which played in the Kontinental Hockey League until the 2014-2015 season. Their national ice hockey team has competed in several World Championships and the Olympics.

== Artistic Gymnastics ==
In Ukraine artistic gymnastics is referred to as sports gymnastics.

=== Women ===
Ukraine has had several successful female gymnasts, including but not limited to: Lilia Podkopayeva, Tatyana Gutsu, Larisa Latynina, Viktoria Karpenko, and more recently Anastasia Koval, Alina Kozich, and Iryna Krasnianska.

Ukraine sent a full team to the 2008 Beijing Summer Olympics, the team members were Valentyna Holenkova, Anastasia Koval, Alina Kozich, Iryna Krasnianska, Dariya Zgoba, and Maryna Proskurina. As a team, they placed 11th in qualifications and did not qualify for the team final. Anastasia Koval and Dariya Zgoba both qualified for the uneven bars final, placing 5th and 8th, respectively.

Ukrainian gymnasts enjoyed success at the 2009 European Championships in Milan, Italy. They qualified at least one gymnast to each of the apparatus finals, and garnered a gold and bronze medal in the finals. Notable accomplishments at the European Championships:

- Yana Demyanchuk, 2009 European Championships Gold Medalist on Beam; also 12th place in the All-Around competition.
- Anna Kalashnyk, 2009 European Championships Bronze Medalist on Vault

=== Men ===
Oleksandr Vorobiov enjoyed success at the 2008 Beijing Summer Olympics, becoming the bronze medalist on the still rings.

Recently the male gymnasts of Ukraine have enjoyed success at the 2009 European Championships, the 2012 Olympics, and the 2016 Olympics:

- Oleksandr Vorobiov, 2009 European Championships Silver Medalist on Still Rings
- Mykola Kuksenkov, 2009 European Championships Bronze Medalist on High Bar
- Igor Radivilov, 2012 London Summer Olympics Bronze Medalist on Vault
- Oleg Verniaiev, 2016 Rio Summer Olympics Gold Medalist on Parallel Bars

== Rhythmic Gymnastics ==
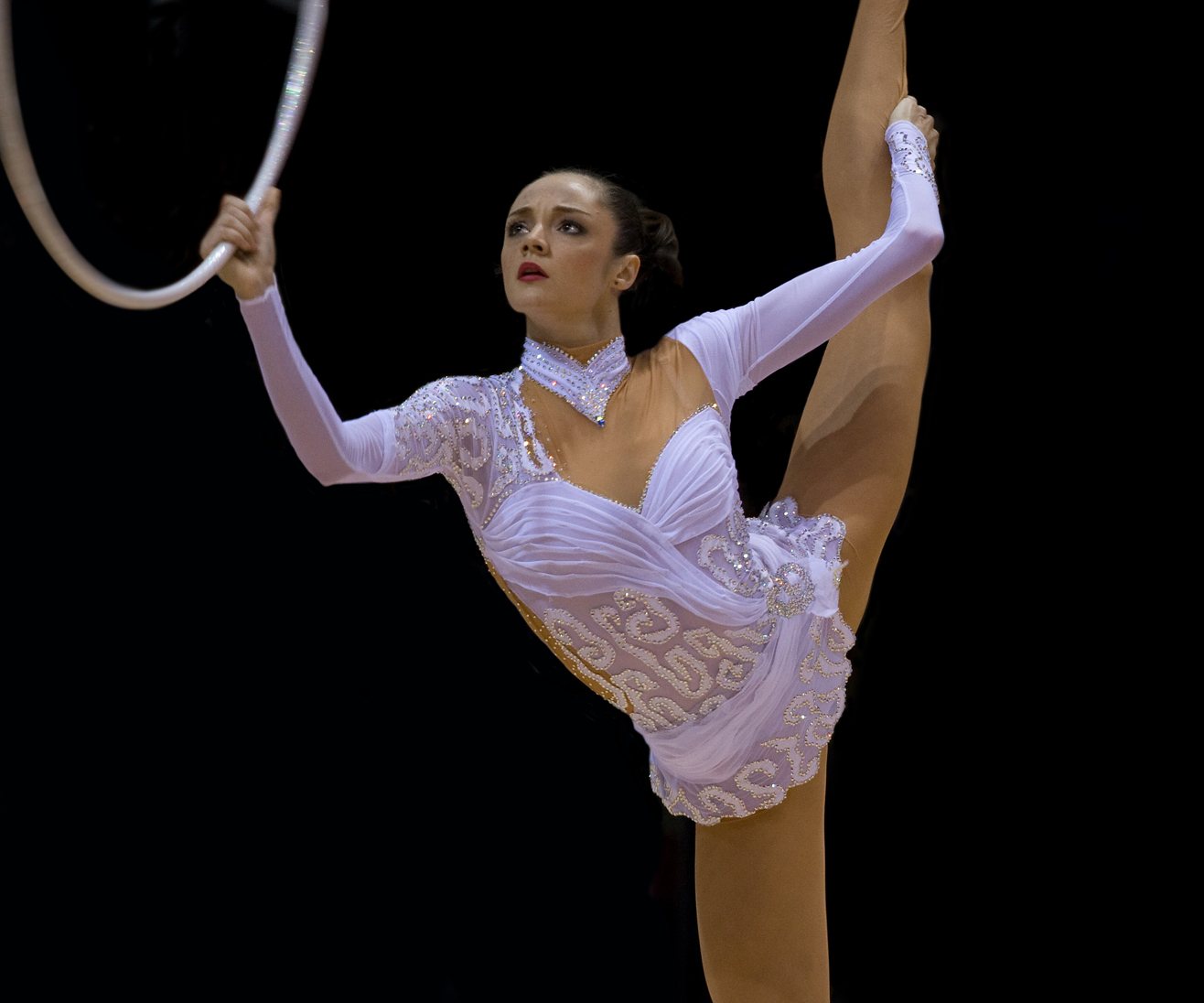
Anna Bessonova

In Ukraine rhythmic gymnastics is referred to as artistic gymnastics. Rhythmic gymnastics is considered one of the most popular sports ever in Ukraine. Many Ukrainian rhythmic gymnasts such as Ludmila Savinkova, Liubov Sereda, Alina Maksymenko, Anna Bessonova, Tamara Yerofeeva, Irina Deriugina, Eleonora Romanova, Oxana Skaldina, Natalia Godunko, Olena Vitrychenko, Ekaterina Serebrianskaya and Olexandra Tymoshenko are among the top rhythmic gymnasts in the world. There are many clubs all over Ukraine. The most famous and strongest rhythmic gymnast training school in Ukraine is the Deriugins School in Kyiv, run by Albina Deriugina and her daughter Irina Deriugina.

== Bandy ==
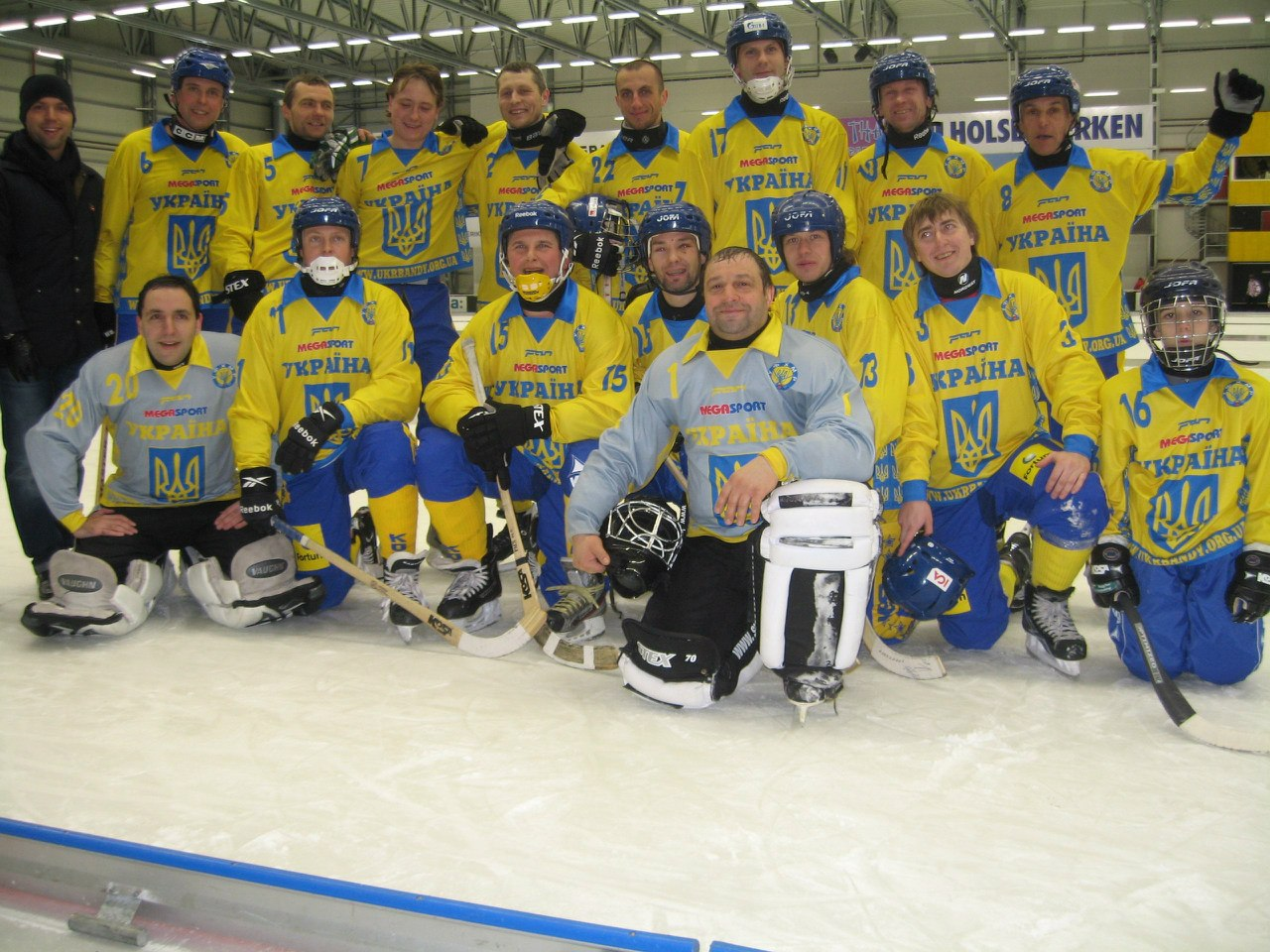
Ukraine at their first World Championship

The national team made its first Bandy World Championship in 2013. At the 2016 tournament, Ukraine reached the semi-final of Division B. In terms of licensed athletes, bandy is the second biggest winter sport in the world.

== Beach volleyball ==
Ukraine featured national teams in beach volleyball that competed in the women's and men's section at the 2018–2020 CEV Beach Volleyball Continental Cup.

== Olympic movement ==
Ukraine is a regular participant in both Summer Olympics and Winter Olympics, and is successful on the international arena. The country's top achievement at the Olympics to date was at the 1996 Summer Olympics, when they came 9th.

At the 1996 Summer Olympics, Ukrainian gymnast Lilia Podkopayeva won the All-Around title in the Women's Gymnastics competition.

Ukrainian swimmer Yana Klochkova is the best Olympian holding a record of 4 gold medals. The only individual gold medal in winter sports is held by a figure skater Oksana Baiul. In team sports, Ukraine received three gold medals in rowing, fencing and biathlon all by female teams. The most successful sports for Ukraine at the Olympics are gymnastics, boxing, shooting.

== Sports institutions and sports centers ==
=== Government ===
- Ministry of Youth and Sports, formerly known as a government committee of youth and sports.

=== General public ===
- National Olympic Committee of Ukraine is an official organization that provides public administration of all Olympic sports in the country and official member of the International Olympic Committee
- Sports Committee of Ukraine, is an official organization that provides public administration of other sports in the country

==== Sports clubs ====
Ukraine has six government sponsored sports and fitness clubs which are part of the national Olympic movement cooperating with the National Olympic Committee of Ukraine and government institutions: Central Sports Club of the Armed Forces of Ukraine (CSK ZSU), Dynamo – Ukraine (law enforcement agencies), Spartak – Ukraine, Ukraine (formerly Avanhard, trade unions), Kolos (agricultural sports association), and Osvita (Ministry of Education and Science). All of them have their representation in all regions of Ukraine providing their facilities and training to athletes.

Among notable historic national sports club there were Sokil, Sich, Ukraine. Ukrainian Sokil gymnastic society was an adaptation of the original Czech Sokil society which earned popularity among most of Slavic nations. Ukrainian Sokil society was popular among Ukrainians of the Austrian part as well as the bigger Russian part of Ukraine. Other important sport society was Sich which contributed to establishment of the Legion of Ukrainian Sich Riflemen. In the Second Polish Republic, Sich sports society was recognized as Polonophobic and was prohibited, among notable examples is renaming of USC Sich Stryi into Skala Stryi.

==== Sports federations/associations ====
There are over 40 official sports federations or associations for most of the Olympic sports. There are also other sports federations or sports unions in the country.

=== Sports education ===
Aside from sports curriculum in regular schools, Ukraine inherited from the Soviet Union an extensive network of youth sports schools, including specialized schools of the Olympic reserve, and school of sports mastery. As of 2011 there were some 1483 sports schools (DYuSSh), 189 specialized [sports] schools of Olympic reserve (SDYuShOR and UOR), and 34 school of higher sports mastery (ShVSM).

There are also two sports universities the National University of Physical Education and Sport of Ukraine (Kyiv), Lviv State University of Physical Culture and Kharkiv State Academy of Physical Culture. Beside that in Ukraine located 9 colleges of physical education, 3 schools of Olympic reserve and 6 sports boarding schools.

== The modern Ukrainian sportspeople ==
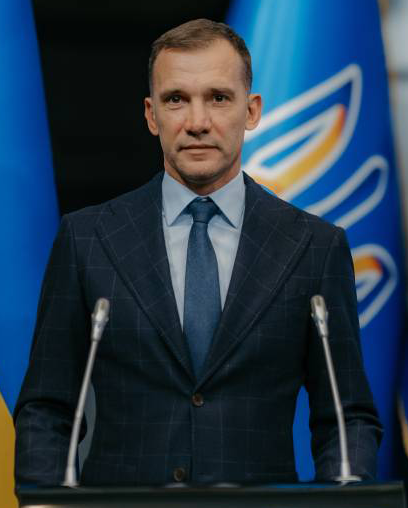
Andriy Shevchenko

- Andriy Shevchenko (born in 1976) - football player, five-time champion of Ukraine, winner of the "Golden Ball" 2004, the best player of Champions League 1998/1999, the winner of the UEFA Champions League 2002/2003. Active player Kyiv "Dynamo", the club of his career start in the 1990s. Also competed for "Milan" and "Chelsea". Known by the nickname "The Devil from the East" and "Sheva". As a part of the Ukrainian team he played in 2006 World Cup in Germany, where his team made it into the quarter finals (this is a starting world championship for Ukrainians).
- Yana Klochkova (born in 1982) - a swimmer, four-time Olympic champion, eleven-time European champion, winner of several World Cups. At the Olympics she won the swimming distances of 200, 400 and 800 meters. Yana holds the world and Olympic records in the 400 meters complex style (4 min. 33.59 sec.). Known by the nickname "Goldfish".
- Ruslan Ponomariov (born in 1983) - chess, 17th World Champion FIDE world champion in the age category under 18. In 1998, at the age of 14, he became the youngest grandmaster in the world.
- Kateryna Lagno (born in 1989) - a chess player, the youngest grandmaster among women (received the title at the age of 12).
- Klitschko brothers, boxers: Wladimir (born in 1976); 1996 Olympic champion; WBA (Super), IBF, WBO, IBO, and The Ring heavyweight champion. Vitali (born in 1971); WBC, and The Ring heavyweight champion.
- Vladislav Terzyul (1953-2004) - a climber who climbed all 14 mountains higher than Earth's 8000 meters, repeating the record of Reinhold Messner.
- Anna Bessonova (born in 1984) - rhythmic gymnast, absolute world champion in 2007.
- Ivan Heshko (born 19 August 1979) - middle-distance track athlete, world champion in 1,500 meters distance.
- Mykola Milchev (born in 1967) - shooter, Olympic champion in 2000.
- Vadim Garbuzov (born 8 May 1987) - dancer, two-time champion of Dancing with the Stars in 2012 and 2014 in Vienna.

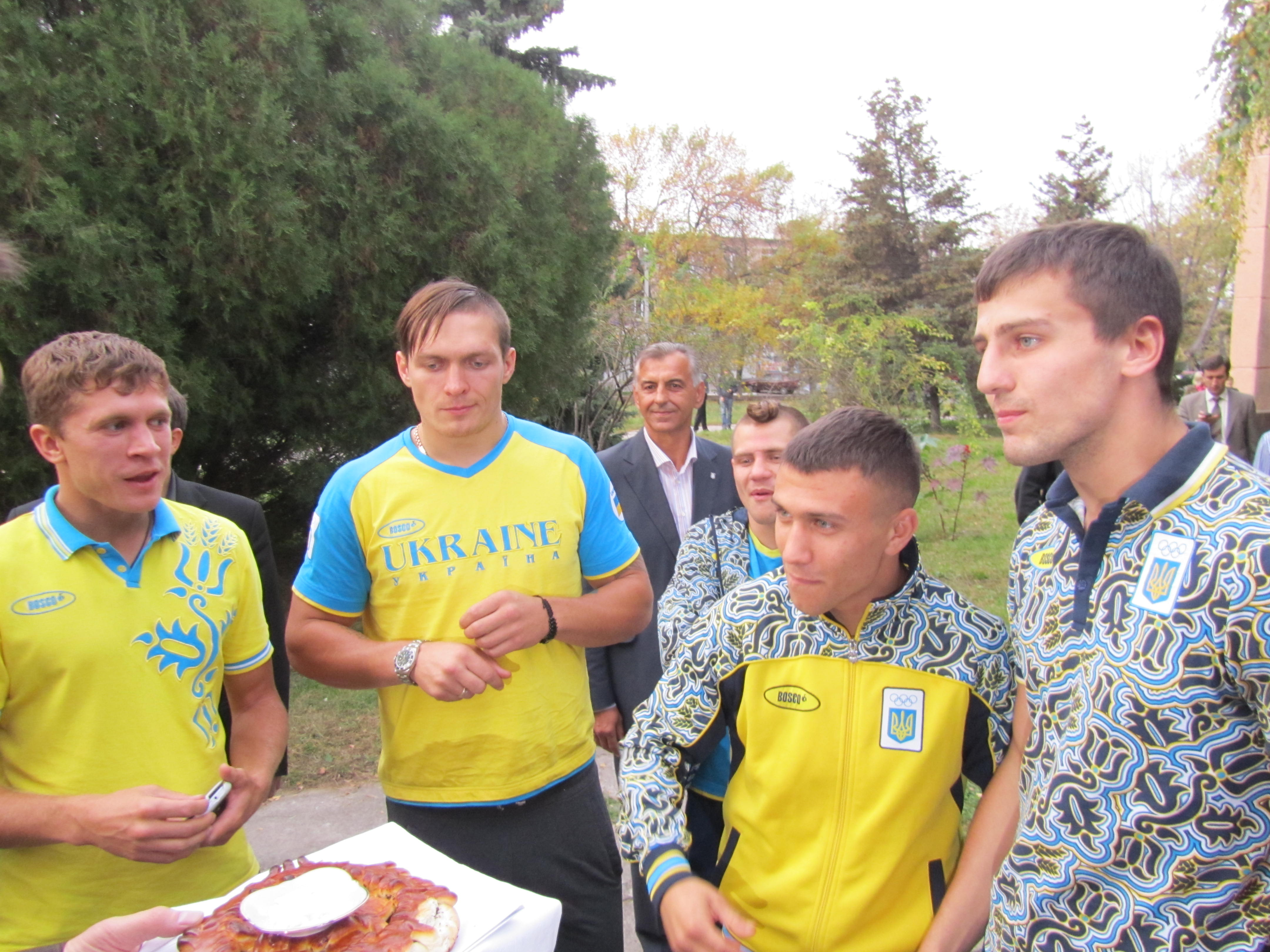
Boxers Taras Shelestyuk, Oleksandr Usyk, Denys Berinchyk, Vasyl Lomachenko and Oleksandr Hvozdyk.

- Vasyl Lomachenko (born In 1988) - boxer, 2008 and 2012 Olympic champion; three-weight world champion.
- Nikita Krylov (born 7 March 1992) - mixed martial artist fighting in the Ultimate Fighting Championship (UFC).
- Igor Vovchanchyn (born 6 August 1973) - mixed martial artist and former contender in the Pride Fighting Championships.
- Oleksandr Usyk (born 17 January 1987) - boxer, 2012 Olympic champion; undisputed champion at cruiserweight. He is also the current WBA, IBF, WBO, and IBO Heavyweight Champion.
- Dasha Kovalova (born 14 December 1994) - Professional ten-pin bowler. She is a five-time champion on the PWBA Tour in the United States.

== See also ==
- List of Ukrainian sports figures killed during the Russo-Ukrainian war
