= 2004 European Women's Artistic Gymnastics Championships =

25th European Women's Artistic Gymnastics Championships
- Location: Amsterdam, Netherlands
- Dates: 29 April to 2 May 2004
- Nations: Members of the European Union of Gymnastics

The 25th European Women's Artistic Gymnastics Championships were held from 29 April to 2 May 2004 in Amsterdam.

== Medalists ==
| Event | Gold | Silver | Bronze |
|---|---|---|---|
Seniors
| Team | Romania; Daniela Șofronie; Cătălina Ponor; Monica Roșu; Alexandra Eremia; Silvia Stroescu | Ukraine; Alina Kozich; Irina Yarotska; Iryna Krasnianska; Olga Sherbatykh; Alona Kvasha | Russia; Svetlana Khorkina; Elena Zamolodchikova; Anna Pavlova; Polina Miller; Leysira Gabdrakmanova |
| Individual all-around | (Ukraine) Alina Kozich | (Romania) Daniela Șofronie | (Russia) Elena Zamolodchikova |
| Vault | (Romania) Monica Roșu | (Russia) Anna Pavlova (Russia) Elena Zamolodchikova | none awarded |
| Uneven bars | (Russia) Svetlana Khorkina | (United Kingdom) Beth Tweddle | (Ukraine) Iryna Krasnianska |
| Balance beam | (Romania) Cătălina Ponor | (Romania) Alexandra Eremia | (Russia) Svetlana Khorkina |
| Floor | (Romania) Cătălina Ponor | (Spain) Elena Gómez | (Italy) Maria Teresa Gargano |
Juniors
| Team | Russia; Yulia Lozhechko; Svetlana Klyukina; Tatiana Kazantseva; Nadezhda Ivanova; Kristina Pravdina | Romania; Steliana Nistor; Sandra Izbașa; Alina Stănculescu; Rodica Marinescu; Dana Zbenghea | Italy; Vanessa Ferrari; Francesca Benolli; Federica Macrì; Roberta Galante |
| Individual all-around | (Romania) Steliana Nistor | (Italy) Vanessa Ferrari | (Russia) Yulia Lozhechko |
| Vault | (Russia) Svetlana Klyukina | (Romania) Steliana Nistor | (Russia) Tatiana Kazantseva |
| Uneven bars | (United Kingdom) Rhian Pugh | (Ukraine) Dariya Zgoba | (Ukraine) Maryna Kostiuchenko |
| Balance beam | (Romania) Alina Stănculescu | (Russia) Yulia Lozhechko | (Italy) Vanessa Ferrari |
| Floor | (Romania) Steliana Nistor | (Romania) Sandra Izbașa | (Italy) Federica Macrì |

=== Medal table ===
==== Combined ====
| Rank | Nation | Gold | Silver | Bronze | Total |
|---|---|---|---|---|---|
| 1 | Romania (ROU) | 7 | 5 | 0 | 12 |
| 2 | Russia (RUS) | 3 | 3 | 5 | 11 |
| 3 | Ukraine (UKR) | 1 | 2 | 2 | 5 |
| 4 | Great Britain (GBR) | 1 | 1 | 0 | 2 |
| 5 | Italy (ITA) | 0 | 1 | 4 | 5 |
| 6 | Spain (ESP) | 0 | 1 | 0 | 1 |
| Totals (6 entries) | | 12 | 13 | 11 | 36 |

==== Seniors ====
| Rank | Nation | Gold | Silver | Bronze | Total |
|---|---|---|---|---|---|
| 1 | Romania (ROU) | 4 | 2 | 0 | 6 |
| 2 | Russia (RUS) | 1 | 2 | 3 | 6 |
| 3 | Ukraine (UKR) | 1 | 1 | 1 | 3 |
| 4 | Great Britain (GBR) | 0 | 1 | 0 | 1 |
| 4 | Spain (ESP) | 0 | 1 | 0 | 1 |
| 6 | Italy (ITA) | 0 | 0 | 1 | 1 |
| Totals (6 entries) | | 6 | 7 | 5 | 18 |

==== Juniors ====
| Rank | Nation | Gold | Silver | Bronze | Total |
|---|---|---|---|---|---|
| 1 | Romania (ROU) | 3 | 3 | 0 | 6 |
| 2 | Russia (RUS) | 2 | 1 | 2 | 5 |
| 3 | Great Britain (GBR) | 1 | 0 | 0 | 1 |
| 4 | Italy (ITA) | 0 | 1 | 3 | 4 |
| 5 | Ukraine (UKR) | 0 | 1 | 1 | 2 |
| Totals (5 entries) | | 6 | 6 | 6 | 18 |

== Seniors ==
=== Team ===
The team competition also served as qualification for the individual finals. The top eight placing teams are shown below; the other teams competing were Bulgaria, Greece, Switzerland, Germany, Czech Republic, Belgium, Poland, Belarus, Slovakia, Finland, Austria, Norway, Lithuania, Hungary, Cyprus and Iceland.

| Rank | Team | Vault (gymnastics) | Uneven bars | Balance beam | Floor (gymnastics) | Total |
|---|---|---|---|---|---|---|
| 1st place, gold medalist(s) | Romania | 28.174 (2) | 27.875 (3) | 28.824 (1) | 27.899 (1) | 112.772 |
| 1st place, gold medalist(s) | Daniela Șofronie | 9.375 | 9.475 | 9.562 | 9.112 | 112.772 |
| 1st place, gold medalist(s) | Cătălina Ponor | 9.337 | | 9.700 | 9.662 | 112.772 |
| 1st place, gold medalist(s) | Monica Roșu | 9.462 | 9.250 | | 9.125 | 112.772 |
| 1st place, gold medalist(s) | Alexandra Eremia | | | 9.562 | | 112.772 |
| 1st place, gold medalist(s) | Silvia Stroescu | | 9.150 | | | 112.772 |
| 2nd place, silver medalist(s) | Ukraine | 27.787 (3) | 28.587 (1) | 27.349 (3) | 27.524 (3) | 111.247 |
| 2nd place, silver medalist(s) | Alina Kozich | 9.275 | 9.500 | 9.512 | 9.075 | 111.247 |
| 2nd place, silver medalist(s) | Irina Yarotska | 9.212 | 9.512 | 8.662 | 9.212 | 111.247 |
| 2nd place, silver medalist(s) | Iryna Krasnianska | | 9.575 | 9.175 | | 111.247 |
| 2nd place, silver medalist(s) | Olga Sherbatykh | 9.300 | | | | 111.247 |
| 2nd place, silver medalist(s) | Alona Kvasha | | | | 9.237 | 111.247 |
| 3rd place, bronze medalist(s) | Russia | 28.574 (1) | 26.837 (6) | 27.437 (2) | 27.575 (2) | 110.423 |
| 3rd place, bronze medalist(s) | Svetlana Khorkina | 9.537 | 9.687 | 9.262 | 9.200 | 110.423 |
| 3rd place, bronze medalist(s) | Elena Zamolodchikova | 9.537 | 8.925 | 9.225 | 9.175 | 110.423 |
| 3rd place, bronze medalist(s) | Anna Pavlova | 9.500 | 8.225 | 8.950 | 9.200 | 110.423 |
| 3rd place, bronze medalist(s) | Polina Miller | | | | | 110.423 |
| 3rd place, bronze medalist(s) | Leysira Gabdrakmanova | | | | | 110.423 |
| 4 | Spain | 27.312 (10) | 28.187 (2) | 25.412 (8) | 26.586 (7) | 107.497 |
| 4 | Elena Gómez | 9.100 | 9.400 | 8.400 | 9.562 | 107.497 |
| 4 | Mónica Mesalles | 9.175 | | 8.187 | 8.937 | 107.497 |
| 4 | Tania Gener | 9.037 | 9.412 | | | 107.497 |
| 4 | Sara Moro | | 9.375 | 8.825 | | 107.497 |
| 4 | Patricia Moreno | | | | 8.087 | 107.497 |
| 5 | Great Britain | 27.386 (7) | 27.337 (4) | 25.637 (7) | 26.649 (5) | 107.009 |
| 5 | Beth Tweddle | 8.912 | 9.562 | 8.925 | 8.850 | 107.009 |
| 5 | Vanessa Hobbs | 9.287 | | 8.212 | 8.912 | 107.009 |
| 5 | Nicola Willis | | 9.075 | | 8.887 | 107.009 |
| 5 | Katy Lennon | 9.187 | 8.700 | | | 107.009 |
| 5 | Elizabeth Line | | | 8.500 | | 107.009 |
| 6 | Italy | 27.612 (4) | 26.612 (7) | 25.899 (5) | 26.636 (6) | 106.759 |
| 6 | Monica Bergamelli | 9.262 | 9.000 | 8.975 | 8.687 | 106.759 |
| 6 | Maria Teresa Gargano | 9.175 | 8.762 | 8.037 | 9.287 | 106.759 |
| 6 | Cristina Cavalli | 9.175 | 8.850 | | | 106.759 |
| 6 | Ilaria Colombo | | | 8.887 | | 106.759 |
| 6 | Daria Sarkhosh | | | | 8.662 | 106.759 |
| 7 | France | 27.337 (9) | 27.199 (5) | 25.274 (9) | 26.887 (4) | 106.697 |
| 7 | Soraya Chaouch | 9.100 | 9.337 | 7.862 | 8.600 | 106.697 |
| 7 | Marine Debauve | | 9.300 | 8.562 | 9.225 | 106.697 |
| 7 | Nelly Ramassamy | 8.925 | | 8.850 | 9.062 | 106.697 |
| 7 | Coralie Chacon | 9.312 | | | | 106.697 |
| 7 | Émilie Le Pennec | | 8.562 | | | 106.697 |
| 8 | Netherlands | 27.437 (6) | 25.811 (12) | 26.599 (4) | 26.349 (8) | 106.196 |
| 8 | Loes Linders | 9.175 | 8.687 | 8.737 | 8.887 | 106.196 |
| 8 | Suzanne Harmes | 9.062 | | 8.987 | 9.262 | 106.196 |
| 8 | Evi Neijssen | 9.200 | | | 8.200 | 106.196 |
| 8 | Nathalie Bletterman | | 8.062 | 8.875 | | 106.196 |
| 8 | Laura van Leeuwen | | 9.062 | | | 106.196 |

=== Individual all-around ===
| Rank | Gymnast | Vault (gymnastics) | Uneven bars | Balance beam | Floor (gymnastics) | Total |
|---|---|---|---|---|---|---|
| 1st place, gold medalist(s) | Alina Kozich (UKR) | 9.250 | 9.475 | 9.075 | 9.462 | 37.262 |
| 2nd place, silver medalist(s) | Daniela Șofronie (ROU) | 9.300 | 9.425 | 9.212 | 9.287 | 37.224 |
| 3rd place, bronze medalist(s) | Elena Zamolodchikova (RUS) | 9.437 | 9.125 | 9.150 | 9.437 | 37.149 |
| 4 | Svetlana Khorkina (RUS) | 8.662 | 9.537 | 9.387 | 9.262 | 36.848 |
| 5 | Elena Gómez (ESP) | 9.012 | 9.312 | 8.812 | 9.600 | 36.736 |
| 6 | Irina Yarotska (UKR) | 9.137 | 9.562 | 8.387 | 8.850 | 35.936 |
| 7 | Maria Teresa Gargano (ITA) | 9.137 | 8.737 | 8.650 | 9.262 | 35.786 |
| 8 | Stefani Bismpikou (GRE) | 9.000 | 8.950 | 9.225 | 8.337 | 35.512 |
| 9 | Melanie Marti (SUI) | 9.150 | 9.025 | 8.425 | 8.675 | 35.275 |
| 10 | Soraya Chaouch (FRA) | 8.975 | 9.350 | 8.950 | 7.975 | 35.250 |
| 11 | Beth Tweddle (GBR) | 8.925 | 9.537 | 8.012 | 8.650 | 35.124 |
| 11 | Monica Bergamelli (ITA) | 9.175 | 8.962 | 8.387 | 8.600 | 35.124 |
| 13 | Ariella Käslin (SUI) | 9.150 | 8.737 | 8.162 | 9.000 | 35.049 |
| 14 | Loes Linders (NED) | 9.237 | 8.625 | 8.325 | 8.712 | 34.899 |
| 15 | Tina Erceg (CRO) | 9.025 | 8.625 | 8.675 | 8.550 | 34.875 |
| 16 | Lisa Brüggemann (GER) | 8.987 | 9.125 | 8.687 | 8.062 | 34.861 |
| 17 | Kateřina Marešová (CZE) | 9.012 | 8.887 | 8.350 | 8.487 | 34.736 |
| 18 | Aagje Vanwalleghem (BEL) | 9.112 | 8.200 | 8.725 | 8.687 | 34.724 |
| 19 | Yvonne Musik (GER) | 9.187 | 8.737 | 8.075 | 8.662 | 34.661 |
| 20 | Zuzana Sekerová (SVK) | 9.087 | 8.750 | 9.162 | 7.425 | 34.424 |
| 21 | Nikolina Tankousheva (BUL) | 9.087 | 8.837 | 8.075 | 7.900 | 33.899 |
| 22 | Jana Šikulová (CZE) | 8.762 | 8.862 | 7.550 | 8.525 | 33.699 |
| 23 | Marta Pihan (POL) | 8.937 | 8.225 | 8.225 | 7.962 | 33.349 |
| 24 | Volha Tiarentiava (BLR) | 9.087 | 8.587 | 7.500 | 8.037 | 33.211 |

=== Vault ===
| Rank | Gymnast | Score 1 | Score 2 | Total |
|---|---|---|---|---|
| 1st place, gold medalist(s) | Monica Roșu (ROU) | 9.512 | 9.487 | 9.499 |
| 2nd place, silver medalist(s) | Anna Pavlova (RUS) | 9.400 | 9.362 | 9.381 |
| 2nd place, silver medalist(s) | Elena Zamolodchikova (RUS) | 9.475 | 9.287 | 9.381 |
| 4 | Olga Sherbatykh (UKR) | 9.225 | 9.175 | 9.200 |
| 5 | Daniela Șofronie (ROU) | 9.087 | 9.300 | 9.193 |
| 6 | Vanessa Hobbs (GBR) | 9.250 | 9.075 | 9.162 |
| 7 | Aagje Vanwalleghem (BEL) | 9.100 | 9.175 | 9.137 |
| 8 | Yvonne Musik (GER) | 9.112 | 9.062 | 9.087 |

=== Uneven bars ===
| Rank | Gymnast | Total |
|---|---|---|
| 1st place, gold medalist(s) | Svetlana Khorkina (RUS) | 9.662 |
| 2nd place, silver medalist(s) | Beth Tweddle (GBR) | 9.587 |
| 3rd place, bronze medalist(s) | Iryna Krasnianska (UKR) | 9.562 |
| 4 | Irina Yarotska (UKR) | 9.525 |
| 5 | Tania Gener (ESP) | 9.362 |
| 6 | Daniela Șofronie (ROU) | 9.325 |
| 7 | Sara Moro (ESP) | 9.312 |
| 8 | Soraya Chaouch (FRA) | 8.525 |

=== Balance beam ===
| Rank | Gymnast | Total |
|---|---|---|
| 1st place, gold medalist(s) | Cătălina Ponor (ROU) | 9.725 |
| 2nd place, silver medalist(s) | Alexandra Eremia (ROU) | 9.575 |
| 3rd place, bronze medalist(s) | Svetlana Khorkina (RUS) | 9.325 |
| 4 | Iryna Krasnianska (UKR) | 9.200 |
| 5 | Alina Kozich (UKR) | 8.875 |
| 6 | Zuzana Sekerová (SVK) | 8.850 |
| 7 | Elena Zamolodchikova (RUS) | 8.775 |
| 8 | Suzanne Harmes (NED) | 8.050 |

=== Floor ===
| Rank | Gymnast | Total |
|---|---|---|
| 1st place, gold medalist(s) | Cătălina Ponor (ROU) | 9.637 |
| 2nd place, silver medalist(s) | Elena Gómez (ESP) | 9.575 |
| 3rd place, bronze medalist(s) | Maria Teresa Gargano (ITA) | 9.350 |
| 4 | Suzanne Harmes (NED) | 9.325 |
| 5 | Irina Yarotska (UKR) | 9.262 |
| 6 | Marine Debauve (FRA) | 9.162 |
| 7 | Svetlana Khorkina (RUS) | 9.112 |
| 8 | Alona Kvasha (UKR) | 8.500 |

== Juniors ==
=== Team ===
| Rank | Team | Vault (gymnastics) | Uneven bars | Balance beam | Floor (gymnastics) | Total |
|---|---|---|---|---|---|---|
| 1st place, gold medalist(s) | Russia | 28.061 (1) | 26.449 (4) | 27.275 (1) | 25.774 (5) | 107.559 |
| 1st place, gold medalist(s) | Yulia Lozhechko | 9.262 | 9.450 | 9.575 | 8.887 | 107.559 |
| 1st place, gold medalist(s) | Svetlana Klyukina | 9.487 | 9.012 | 9.050 | 8.387 | 107.559 |
| 1st place, gold medalist(s) | Tatiana Kazantseva | 9.312 | | | 8.500 | 107.559 |
| 1st place, gold medalist(s) | Nadezhda Ivanova | | | 8.650 | | 107.559 |
| 1st place, gold medalist(s) | Kristina Pravdina | | 7.987 | | | 107.559 |
| 2nd place, silver medalist(s) | Romania | 27.899 (2) | 24.824 (7) | 25.937 (2) | 27.724 (1) | 106.384 |
| 2nd place, silver medalist(s) | Sandra Izbașa | 9.287 | 8.687 | 8.600 | 9.275 | 106.384 |
| 2nd place, silver medalist(s) | Steliana Nistor | 9.350 | 8.375 | 8.600 | 9.387 | 106.384 |
| 2nd place, silver medalist(s) | Rodica Marinescu | | 7.762 | | 9.062 | 106.384 |
| 2nd place, silver medalist(s) | Dana Zbenghea | 9.262 | | | | 106.384 |
| 2nd place, silver medalist(s) | Alina Stănculescu | | | 8.737 | | 106.384 |
| 3rd place, bronze medalist(s) | Italy | 27.850 (3) | 26.649 (3) | 25.174 (3) | 26.299 (3) | 105.972 |
| 3rd place, bronze medalist(s) | Vanessa Ferrari | 9.225 | 8.737 | 9.212 | 8.412 | 105.972 |
| 3rd place, bronze medalist(s) | Francesca Benolli | 9.450 | 8.950 | 7.762 | 8.837 | 105.972 |
| 3rd place, bronze medalist(s) | Federica Macrì | 9.175 | | | 9.050 | 105.972 |
| 3rd place, bronze medalist(s) | Roberta Galante | | 8.962 | 8.200 | | 105.972 |
| 4 | Great Britain | 27.424 (4) | 27.024 (1) | 24.300 (6) | 26.324 (2) | 105.072 |
| 4 | Aisling Williams | 9.287 | 9.050 | 8.025 | 8.762 | 105.072 |
| 4 | Imogen Cairns | 9.200 | 8.537 | | 8.887 | 105.072 |
| 4 | Amy Fossheim | 8.937 | | 8.025 | 8.675 | 105.072 |
| 4 | Rhian Pugh | | 9.437 | 8.250 | | 105.072 |
| 5 | France | 27.186 (6) | 25.599 (5) | 24.412 (5) | 26.087 (4) | 103.284 |
| 5 | Rose-Eliandre Bellemare | 8.987 | 8.712 | 8.787 | 8.587 | 103.284 |
| 5 | Julie Martinez | 9.012 | 8.625 | 8.150 | 8.925 | 103.284 |
| 5 | Katheleen Lindor | 9.187 | 8.262 | | | 103.284 |
| 5 | Cassy Véricel | | | 7.475 | 8.575 | 103.284 |
| 6 | Netherlands | 27.337 (5) | 25.500 (6) | 24.749 (4) | 24.836 (8) | 102.422 |
| 6 | Renee De Wit | 9.125 | 9.075 | 8.112 | 7.987 | 102.422 |
| 6 | Sanne Wevers | | 8.200 | 8.237 | 8.362 | 102.422 |
| 6 | Danila Koster | 9.200 | | | 8.487 | 102.422 |
| 6 | Sherine El-Zeiny | 9.012 | | 8.400 | | 102.422 |
| 6 | Lichelle Wong | | 8.225 | | | 102.422 |
| 7 | Ukraine | 26.012 (11) | 26.837 (2) | 23.636 (8) | 25.361 (6) | 101.846 |
| 7 | Dariya Zgoba | 8.700 | 9.387 | 8.987 | 8.237 | 101.846 |
| 7 | Maryna Kostiuchenko | 9.000 | 9.025 | 6.662 | 8.587 | 101.846 |
| 7 | Maryna Sergiyenko | 8.312 | | | 8.537 | 101.846 |
| 7 | Yuliya Kayukova | | 8.425 | | | 101.846 |
| 7 | Anna Povolya | | | 7.987 | | 101.846 |
| 8 | Croatia | 26.424 (9) | 24.799 (8) | 23.537 (9) | 24.911 (7) | 99.671 |
| 8 | Tanja Delladio | 9.050 | 8.625 | 8.000 | 8.412 | 99.671 |
| 8 | Maria Fister | 8.512 | 8.087 | 8.487 | 8.312 | 99.671 |
| 8 | Tijana Tkalčec | 8.862 | 8.087 | 7.050 | 8.187 | 99.671 |

=== Individual all-around ===
| Rank | Gymnast | Vault (gymnastics) | Uneven bars | Balance beam | Floor (gymnastics) | Total |
|---|---|---|---|---|---|---|
| 1st place, gold medalist(s) | Steliana Nistor (ROU) | 9.287 | 9.375 | 9.575 | 9.350 | 37.587 |
| 2nd place, silver medalist(s) | Vanessa Ferrari (ITA) | 9.225 | 8.900 | 9.125 | 9.275 | 36.525 |
| 3rd place, bronze medalist(s) | Yulia Lozhechko (RUS) | 9.237 | 9.537 | 8.637 | 9.037 | 36.448 |
| 4 | Aisling Williams (GBR) | 9.187 | 8.900 | 8.687 | 8.875 | 35.649 |
| 5 | Rose-Eliandre Bellemare (FRA) | 8.862 | 8.775 | 8.925 | 8.862 | 35.424 |
| 6 | Sandra Izbașa (ROU) | 9.125 | 8.862 | 8.100 | 9.237 | 35.324 |
| 7 | Julie Martinez (FRA) | 9.187 | 8.775 | 8.812 | 8.412 | 35.186 |
| 8 | Francesca Benolli (ITA) | 9.375 | 8.412 | 8.087 | 9.050 | 34.924 |
| 9 | Maryna Kostiuchenko (UKR) | 8.850 | 9.362 | 7.712 | 8.887 | 34.811 |
| 10 | Renee De Wit (NED) | 8.975 | 8.925 | 8.737 | 8.012 | 34.649 |
| 11 | Viktoria Makshtarova (BLR) | 8.862 | 8.587 | 8.600 | 8.387 | 34.436 |
| 12 | Dariya Zgoba (UKR) | 8.400 | 9.475 | 7.950 | 8.587 | 34.412 |
| 13 | Mélodie Pulgarín (ESP) | 8.937 | 8.937 | 7.525 | 8.800 | 34.199 |
| 14 | Svetlana Klyukina (RUS) | 9.237 | 8.112 | 8.012 | 8.837 | 34.198 |
| 15 | Tanja Delladio (CRO) | 8.825 | 8.237 | 8.312 | 8.487 | 33.861 |
| 16 | Annika Pfeffer (GER) | 8.862 | 8.712 | 8.175 | 7.800 | 33.549 |
| 17 | Irina Kalmykova (BLR) | 8.437 | 8.587 | 7.875 | 8.162 | 33.061 |
| 18 | Vasiliki Georgakopoulou (GRE) | 8.475 | 7.737 | 8.112 | 8.450 | 32.774 |
| 19 | Maria Fister (CRO) | 8.350 | 8.250 | 7.437 | 8.200 | 32.237 |
| 20 | Lara Marx (LUX) | 8.925 | 7.987 | 8.087 | 7.225 | 32.224 |
| 21 | Lynn Moonen (BEL) | 8.587 | 8.787 | 7.037 | 7.600 | 32.011 |
| 22 | Despoina Grigoriadou (GRE) | 8.475 | 8.100 | 6.925 | 8.050 | 31.550 |
| 23 | Eva Verbová (CZE) | 8.512 | 8.200 | 7.637 | 7.075 | 31.424 |
| 24 | Vered Finkel (ISR) | 8.887 | 8.275 | 6.562 | 7.387 | 31.111 |

=== Vault ===
| Rank | Gymnast | Score 1 | Score 2 | Total |
|---|---|---|---|---|
| 1st place, gold medalist(s) | Svetlana Klyukina (RUS) | 9.375 | 9.225 | 9.300 |
| 2nd place, silver medalist(s) | Steliana Nistor (ROU) | 9.262 | 9.262 | 9.262 |
| 3rd place, bronze medalist(s) | Tatiana Kazantseva (RUS) | 9.287 | 9.175 | 9.231 |
| 4 | Francesca Benolli (ITA) | 9.425 | 9.000 | 9.212 |
| 5 | Sandra Izbașa (ROU) | 9.200 | 8.950 | 9.075 |
| 6 | Mélodie Pulgarín (ESP) | 9.025 | 9.112 | 9.068 |
| 7 | Imogen Cairns (GBR) | 9.150 | 8.950 | 9.050 |
| 8 | Aisling Williams (GBR) | 9.100 | 8.925 | 9.012 |

=== Uneven bars ===
| Rank | Gymnast | Total |
|---|---|---|
| 1st place, gold medalist(s) | Rhian Pugh (GBR) | 9.375 |
| 2nd place, silver medalist(s) | Dariya Zgoba (UKR) | 9.350 |
| 3rd place, bronze medalist(s) | Maryna Kostiuchenko (UKR) | 9.287 |
| 4 | Renee De Wit (NED) | 9.087 |
| 5 | Aisling Williams (GBR) | 8.950 |
| 6 | Vanessa Ferrari (ITA) | 8.750 |
| 7 | Svetlana Klyukina (RUS) | 8.175 |
| 8 | Yulia Lozhechko (RUS) | 7.975 |

=== Balance beam ===
| Rank | Gymnast | Total |
|---|---|---|
| 1st place, gold medalist(s) | Alina Stănculescu (ROU) | 9.312 |
| 2nd place, silver medalist(s) | Yulia Lozhechko (RUS) | 9.200 |
| 3rd place, bronze medalist(s) | Vanessa Ferrari (ITA) | 9.175 |
| 4 | Sandra Izbașa (ROU) | 8.887 |
| 5 | Margarita Vatidi (GRE) | 8.312 |
| 6 | Viktoria Makshtarova (BLR) | 8.262 |
| 6 | Rose-Eliandre Bellemare (FRA) | 8.262 |
| 8 | Dariya Zgoba (UKR) | 8.212 |

=== Floor ===
| Rank | Gymnast | Total |
|---|---|---|
| 1st place, gold medalist(s) | Steliana Nistor (ROU) | 9.312 |
| 2nd place, silver medalist(s) | Sandra Izbașa (ROU) | 9.237 |
| 3rd place, bronze medalist(s) | Federica Macri (ITA) | 9.037 |
| 4 | Yulia Lozhechko (RUS) | 8.975 |
| 5 | Imogen Cairns (GBR) | 8.625 |
| 6 | Francesca Benolli (ITA) | 8.475 |
| 7 | Mélodie Pulgarín (ESP) | 8.175 |
| 8 | Julie Martinez (FRA) | 8.025 |
