= Leysira Gabdrakmanova =

Russian female artistic gymnast (born 1987)

- Born: 4 January 1987 (age 39)

Gymnastics career
- Discipline: Women's artistic gymnastics
- Country represented: Russia (2004)

Leysira Gabdrakmanova (born 4 January 1987) is a Russian female artistic gymnast who won the bronze medal in the team event at the 2004 European Women's Artistic Gymnastics Championships.
