= Rhian Pugh =

British artistic gymnast (born 1989)

- Nickname: Rhi
- Born: 16 April 1989 (age 37) Newport, Wales
- Height: 164 cm (5 ft 5 in)

Gymnastics career
- Country represented: United Kingdom Wales
- Club: Bristol Hawks Gymnastics Club
- Head coach: Helen May

Rhian Pugh (born 16 April 1989) is a British gymnast. Born in Wales, she is also a member of the Welsh National Squad and part of British Gymnastics World Class Potential Programme.

Pugh became British Junior Bar Champion for 2003 and was selected for the Great Britain Junior National Squad from 2003 to 2004. First competing for Great Britain in Canada in March 2003 where she achieved silver on bars & team silver in the Jurassic Classic plus silver on beam at the Bluewater International.

In 2004, Rhian became champion on asymmetric bars and balance beam at the Junior British National Championships. She also won gold on the bars at the European Junior Championships with a routine described as "uniquely original" by the judges.

She later joined the senior squad representing Wales at the 2006 Commonwealth Games.

Pugh says Russian gymnast, Svetlana Khorkina is her favourite gymnast. She said "I'd love, like Khorkina has, to develop my own style & progress to the level where I could include some unique elements of my own".
