= Iryna Krasnianska =

Ukrainian artistic gymnast (born 1987)

- Full name: Iryna V. Krasnianska
- Alternative name: Ira
- Nickname: Krasniaka
- Born: November 19, 1987 (age 38) Vologda, Russian SFSR, Soviet Union
- Height: 155 cm (5 ft 1 in)

Gymnastics career
- Discipline: Women's artistic gymnastics
- Country represented: Ukraine
- Club: Biola
- Head coach: Igor Korobchinsky
- Assistant coach: Inna Korobchinskaya
- Former coach: Alla Krasovskaya
- Eponymous skills: Uneven Bars
Medal record
World Championships
Gold medal – first place	2006 Aarhus	Balance Beam
European Championships
Silver medal – second place	2004 Amsterdam	Team
Bronze medal – third place	2004 Amsterdam	Uneven Bars

Iryna Krasnianska (Ukrainian: Ірина Василівна Краснянська, Irina Krasnyanska), born on November 19, 1987, in Vologda, USSR is a World Champion Ukrainian gymnast from Cherkasy, Ukraine. She started gymnastics in 1992. Iryna is the daughter of Nina, an engineer and Vasili, a doctor. Krasnianska was a 2004 Olympian. Krasnianska is primarily known as an uneven bars and balance beam specialist.

== Career ==
Krasnianska started gymnastics at the age of five. She competed at the 2003 World Championships in Anaheim, California. At the 2003 World Championships, Krasnyanska competed on uneven bars and balance beam in the team final where the Ukrainian team placed 7th. Individually she placed 7th in both the uneven bars and balance beam event finals. The next year, Krasnianska and the Ukrainian team won the silver medal at the 2004 European Championships. She also won a bronze medal on uneven bars and placed 4th on balance beam. Krasnianska made the 2004 Ukrainian Olympic team. At the Athens Olympic Games, Krasnianska and the Ukrainian team placed 4th, missing the bronze medal by less than a point. Individually, she did not advance to any individual finals.

Krasnianska became a World Champion when she won the Balance Beam final at the 2006 World Gymnastics Championships in Aarhus, Denmark. Krasnianska's routine was notable for its flawless presentation and unique mount. Her score of 15.575 was posted after a nervous ten-minute delay and was enough to clinch the gold medal. Krasnianska competed at the 2007 European Champions where she made the balance beam final but she did not medal. At the same World Championships, Krasnianska and the Ukrainian team placed 5th in the team final. At the 2007 European Championships she placed 7th on balance beam. Iryna travelled to Stuttgart, Germany for the 2007 World Championships, but was forced to sit the events out due to an injury.

== Eponymous skill ==
Krasnianska has one eponymous skill in the Code of Points.

Apparatus	Name	Description	Difficulty (Note: Valid for the 2025–2028 Code of Points)
Uneven bars	Krasnyanska	From handstand clear pike circle backwards to rear inverted pike support	D (0.4)

== See also ==
- List of Olympic female artistic gymnasts for Ukraine
