= Zuzana Sekerová =

Slovak gymnast

Zuzana Sekerová (born September 25, 1984, in Trnava) is a retired artistic gymnast from Slovakia. She competed at the 2000 and 2004 Summer Olympics and won the gold medal on the balance beam at the 2004 World Cup.

== History ==
Sekerová was the lone Slovakian gymnast (male or female) to compete at the 2000 Olympic Games in Sydney, where she placed 59th all-around. She was also Slovakia's top all-around scorer at the 1999 World Championships in Tianjin (52nd) and the 2001 World Championships in Ghent (55th).

In 2002, Sekerová moved to the United States, under the sponsorship of gymnastics coach and author Wayne Evans, to train as a power tumbler and become a coach. She rejoined the Slovakian team for the 2003 World Championships in Anaheim, where she finished 78th all-around. She was her team's top scorer on two events, and shared the top score for the team on a third event.

At the 2004 Olympics in Athens, she ranked 47th. She then competed at the 2004 World Cup in La Serena, Chile, where she won the gold medal on balance beam. She also competed at the 2005 American Cup in New York.

Sekerová's most significant international results came in European Championships competition. She placed 14th all-around at the 1996 Junior Europeans in Birmingham, 11th all-around at the 1998 Junior Europeans in Saint Petersburg, and 13th all-around at the 2000 Senior Europeans in Paris. In 2004, at the European Championships in Amsterdam, she finished 5th in the balance beam finals.

In 2007, after taking a break from gymnastics in 2006, Sekerová came back to the Slovak national team to compete at the European Championships in Amsterdam. In a warm-up before the all-around competition, she tore her Achilles tendon. She intended to return to competitive gymnastics after rehabilitation, but was not able to do so.
