= Alina Kozich =

Ukrainian artistic gymnast

- Born: December 16, 1987 (age 38) Kyiv, Ukrainian SSR, Soviet Union
- Height: 153 cm (5 ft 0 in)

Gymnastics career
- Discipline: Women's artistic gymnastics
- Country represented: Uzbekistan
- Former countries represented: Ukraine
- Head coach: Sergii Butsula
- Choreographer: Oksana Omelianchik, Boris Zelepukin
- Music: Valse a Margaux (2004), Tike Tike Kardi (2007-2008), Let's Get Loud by Jennifer Lopez (2008)
- Retired: 2009
Medal record
Representing Ukraine
European Championships
Gold medal – first place	2004 Amsterdam	All-Around
Silver medal – second place	2004 Amsterdam	Team
Silver medal – second place	2008 Clermont	Balance Beam
Bronze medal – third place	2007 Amsterdam	All-Around
Bronze medal – third place	2007 Amsterdam	Floor Exercise
Summer Universiade
Silver medal – second place	2007 Bangkok	Team
European Youth Olympic Festival
Gold medal – first place	2001 Murcia	Individual combined

Alina Kozich (Ukrainian: Алина Козич, born December 16, 1987) is a Ukrainian former artistic gymnast. She was a member of the Ukrainian team at the 2004 Summer Olympics in Athens.

== Gymnastics career ==
Kozich started gymnastics when she was 5. She first came to prominence at the age of 13, when she won the all-around competition at the 2001 European Youth Olympics in Murcia, Spain. Her success continued with a gold medal on the uneven bars and a 4th-place finish in the all-around at the 2002 Junior European Championships in Patras, Greece.

=== 2003–04 ===
In 2003, Kozich moved into the senior ranks. At the 2003 World Championships, she finished 8th in the all-around, and the Ukrainian team placed 7th, qualifying for the team competition at the 2004 Olympics.

The Olympic year started strongly for Kozich, with a career-highlight victory in the all-around at the 2004 European Championships, where she narrowly defeated Daniela Șofronie of Romania. She was the first Ukrainian to take this title since Lilia Podkopayeva in 1996, and joined a list of older compatriots such as Tatiana Gutsu and Ludmilla Tourischeva. Frequently, the European all-around champion in an Olympic year goes on to take the Olympic all-around title (this was the case in 1976, 1992, and 1996), so expectations for Kozich were high heading into Athens.

At the Olympics, Kozich helped the Ukrainian team finish fourth, their best-ever Olympic result. In the team final, she had the highest all-around score of any gymnast, including Carly Patterson and Svetlana Khorkina, who would go on to place first and second in the all-around final, respectively. However, in the all-around final, Kozich had major problems on the balance beam, with a big balance check on one of her simplest elements and then falling on her dismount, and placed 11th. In the floor exercise final, she fell on her first tumbling pass and placed 8th.

=== 2005-08 ===
Kozich did not make any individual finals at the 2005 World Championships in Melbourne or the 2006 European Championships in Greece, but she won a silver medal on floor at the 2005 Glasgow Grand Prix and helped the Ukrainian team to a fifth-place finish at the 2006 European Championships. In late 2006, she began to regain the form that won her the 2004 European title, placing 13th in the all-around final at the 2006 World Championships in Aarhus, Denmark. She also helped the Ukrainian team finish fifth in the team final.

Kozich won several medals at World Cup events in 2007 and solidified her comeback with bronze medals in the all-around and on floor at the European Championships in Amsterdam, with Vanessa Ferrari of Italy taking both titles.

She made her second Olympic team in 2008 and competed on all four events in qualifications, trying to make the all-around final. However, after two falls on uneven bars and floor, she finished 45th and did not advance to any finals.

After the 2008 Olympics, Kozich started competing for Uzbekistan but continued to train at her gym in Ukraine, with a different coach.

=== Retirement ===
At the end of 2009, Kozich announced that she had retired as a gymnast.

== Coaching career ==
Kozich became the official choreographer of the Japanese women's gymnastics team and was present as a coach at the 2010 World Championships in Rotterdam. She later worked with the Hungarian national team before moving to Belarus in 2017 to work with the Belarus women's national artistic gymnastics team.

== See also ==
- List of Olympic female gymnasts for Ukraine
